= Mayo county ladies' football team =

Ladies' Gaelic football team

Mayo LGFA
- Irish Name: Maigh Eo
- Nicknames: The Westerners
- Province: Connacht
- County Colours: Green and Red
- Main Sponsors: Intersport Elverys
- Ground(s): Swinford Amenity Park & Hastings Insurance MacHale Pk; NUI Galway Connacht GAA Air Dome

2024 Personnel
- Chairperson: Sinéad Stagg
- Manager: Liam McHale

2023 Results
- Championship: Semi-Final
- League: 6th

Competitions
- Championship: Brendan Martin Cup
- League: Division 1

Titles
- Senior Championships: 4 (2003, 2002, 2000, 1999)
- League Titles: 3 (2007, 2004, 2000)
- Intermediate Championships: 1 (1993)
- Junior Championships: 1 (1987)

The Mayo county ladies' football team represents Mayo in amateur ladies' Gaelic football. The team competes in inter-county competitions such as the All-Ireland TG4 Senior Ladies Championship and the Lidl Ladies National Football League as a member of the Ladies Gaelic Football Association.

Mayo are the fifth most successful team in the championship of all time, with four wins, and fifth most successful in the League of all time, with three wins. The late 1990s and early 2000s, when Mayo won four All-Ireland Championships in five years, is considered the "golden era" of ladies' football in Mayo. Mayo last won a major title in 2007, defeating Galway in Division 1 of the National Football League, and last won silverware in 2023, also defeating Galway in the Connacht championship.

== History ==
Though not represented at the founding of the Ladies Gaelic Football Association in 1974, Mayo has been a constant presence in ladies football. The first provincial council for Ladies Football in Connacht was established in 1975 with three counties participating; Galway, Roscommon and Mayo. Mayo's first official game as a county team occurred on the 13 July 1975, where they lost to Galway in Ballinasloe by 2–5 to 0–1. The squad for Mayo's first ever game were as follows: Margaret A. Loftus (Crossmolina), Bea O’Malley (Newport), Pauline Gilger (Lahardane), Mary Larkin (Ballintubber), Mary E. Chambers (Newport), Christina McCormack (Islandeady), Finuala Murray (Newport), Rosaleen Conway (Ballintubber), Captain Marie Kenny (Islandeady), Teresa Higgins (Claremorris), Ann O’Brien (Claremorris), Mary F. McDonnell (Newport), Kathleen Rowland (Crossmolina), Liz Kilcourse (Castlebar), Catherine Larkin (Ballintubber). Substitutes: Marian Cullinane, Breege Murphy, Kathleen Jordan, Ann Loftus, Bernadette Boland, Ann Bourke, Vera Coyne, and Caroline Moran.

Losing to Galway and later Roscommon in the inaugural Connacht championship in 1975, Mayo became the second winners of the Senior Connacht Championship in 1976, defeating Galway. Connacht played their first inter-provincial match against Leinster in 1976, with six Mayo players representing: Brid Fitzgerald, Ann Burke, Pauleen Finnerty, Mary O, Roseleen Conway and Valerie Collins, a game which Leinster won after a replay, in Ballycumber, County Offaly. Mayo went through a period of no trophies in the early to mid-eighties, mainly because the Connacht championship did not take place in the years 1978, 1979, 1982, 1985 and 1986, before clinching the All-Ireland Junior title in 1987, defeating Wexford and officially being graded as a senior team. The junior championship final against Wexford was the first time a team from Connacht had played in Croke Park. Mayo also went on to win the Connacht championship title for 3 consecutive years in 1988,1989 and 1990. Mayo lost to Laois in the semi-final of the All-Ireland championship in 1988, losing by 1–10 to 1–1.

Pauline Mullen was the first Mayo player to win an All-Star award in 1992. Mayo failed to win silverware again until 1993, where they won the Intermediate Championship or All-Ireland B Final as it was called at the time, defeating Dublin. From 1993 to 2001, the Connacht championship was not played due to a lack of teams being fielded, and Mayo automatically qualified for the semi-final of the All-Ireland Championship each year in these years. The period between 1993 and 1998 however was heartbreak for Mayo as they failed to advance past the semi-finals. In the 1993 semi-final Mayo played Laois in Ballina, County Mayo which ended in a draw, with a score line of Mayo 1–10 to Laois’ 0–13. The replay held in Stradbally, County Laois resulted in a 3–16 to 2–05 victory for Laois. Despite this, Bernie O’Neill became the second Mayo player to be awarded an All-Star in 1993. Between 1994 and 1996 Mayo were beaten both in the semi-finals of the championship and in the final of the National League, losing in the league to Monaghan in 1994, Waterford in 1995 and Monaghan again in 1996. Despite this, All-Stars were acquired by Diane O’Hora in 1994, both Bernie O’Neill and Patricia Mullen in 1995, and by Christina Heffernan in 1996. In 1996, Mayo were defeated in the championship semi-final by Laois again by a score line of 3–14 to 0–19 in MacHale Park. It should be noted however that during the same period the youth teams in Mayo dominated the early to mid-90s in Connacht, with the U14's capturing titles in 94,95,96 and 97, and the U16s winning Connacht championships in 90, 92, 93, 94, 96, 97 and 98.

In 1997 Mayo were defeated by Monaghan in the championship semi-final, and in 1998 in the semi-final they lost to Waterford in Dungarvan. Christina Heffernan picked up her second All-Star award in 1998. Though Mayo had come agonisingly close to an All-Ireland final appearance throughout the late 80s and most of the 90s, the combination of dual managers John Mullin and Finbar Egan from 1998 onwards and the influx of young Mayo players with a taste for and experience with success at underage level led to a period of dominance for Mayo ladies football between 1999 and 2004.

== 1999 ==
=== League ===
In the 1999 league campaign, Mayo reached the semi-finals where they were beaten by Waterford.

== The 1999 All-Ireland Senior Ladies' Championship Final ==
=== The Build-Up ===
In 1999, Mayo reached their first All-Ireland Championship final by defeating Meath 3–13 to 2–07 in Parnell Park. Waterford defeated Monaghan in the other semi-final by a score line of 1–15 to 1–9. Rebecca Halahan for Waterford was sent off in the semi-final for elbowing Monaghan's Edel Byrne and would therefore miss the final due to suspension.

Waterford had previously beaten Mayo in the 1998 championship semi-final, though only after extra-time. A number of Waterford players had featured on all five winning teams, Noirin Walsh and Julianne Torpey in defence, both midfielders, Martina O'Ryan and Olivia Condon and the entire full-forward line, Aine Wall, Claire Ryan, the team captain, and Geraldine O'Ryan. In 1999, Waterford were seeking their third back-to-back title of the decade, having already won the championship in 91 and 92, 94 and 95 and 98. The 1999 Ladies Senior Football Championship Final was heralded as the old guard versus the new; Waterford, the 5-time champions and seasoned veterans against a young but talented Mayo side in their first All-Ireland. Mayo's rising star Cora Staunton suffered a broken collarbone during training two weeks prior to the final.

==== Build-Up Quotes ====
- John Mullin (Mayo Manager) - "This a very big occasion for the entire team and playing at Croke Park for the first time is going to be a new experience, but I think they are mature enough to stand up to it and produce their best form."
- Michael Ryan (Waterford Manager) - "They have a lot of fine young players and they are a hungry young team and they've been knocking on the door for a while now. Much will depend on how they react to Croke Park and all that goes with the final tomorrow. It's something that we feel will give us an advantage."
- Diane O'Hora (Mayo Captain) - "The thing about this team is that they are scared of nobody. Once they get flowing, they are hard to stop."
- Keith Duggan of The Irish Times predicted a Waterford win, saying "Mayo's presence (in the final) points to a bright new century for the sport, but that era is not quite yet upon us."
- Tom O'Riordan of The Independent predicted that Waterford would "leave Mayo feeling blue."

=== Starting Teams ===
| Managers: John Mullin & Finbar Egan Team: 1 Denise Horan; 2 Nuala O'Shea; 3 Helena Lohan; 4 Imelda Mullarkey; 5 Marcella Heffernan; 6 Yvonne Byrne; 7 Niamh Lally; 8 Claire Egan; 9 Christina Heffernan; 10 Maria Staunton; 11 Cora Staunton; 12 Sinéad Costello; 13 Diane O'Hora (c); 14 Sabrina Bailey; 15 Martha O'Malley Substitutes: Orla Casby for Cora Staunton (1 min); Shelly Gibbons for Martha O'Malley (54 mins) | Manager: Michael Ryan Team: 1 Sarah Hickey; 2 Triona Whyte; 3 Annalia Crotty; 4 Noirin Walsh; 5 Marian Troy; 6 Siobhan O'Ryan; 7 Julie Ann Torpey; 8 Martina O'Ryan; 9 Olivia Condon; 10 Fiona Crotty; 11 Mary O'Donnell; 12 Niamh Barry; 13 Aine Wall; 14 Claire Ryan (c); 15 Geraldine O'Ryan Substitutes: D. Nagle for Fiona Crotty (39 mins); P. Walsh for Martina O'Ryan (53 mins) |

=== The Game ===
Cora Staunton started the game but was taken off after 1 minute, replaced by Orla Casby. The action was later explained as 'sentimental' by Mayo manager John Mullin, adding 'we wanted her to be able to say she'd played in Croke Park on an All-Ireland final day. Whatever flak I took didn't matter. On my head be it.' There was no score for the first 8 minutes of play, before Waterford's Claire Ryan got the first point. In the first few minutes of the game, Mayo goalkeeper Denise Horan executed a double save from Áine Wall and Julie Ann Torpey. Christina Heffernan scored Mayo's first point in the 13th minute. After this Mayo began to find their groove. Claire Egan drove clever balls forward to Sinead Costello and Maria Staunton to race onto. Christina Heffernan stretched the Waterford defence with long perceptive balls. Full back Helena Lohan dominated the full back position under the dropping ball, and centre-back Yvonne Byrne fielded the ball excellently, notably in the second half with one-hand amidst several players. Nuala O'Shea kept Waterford taliswoman Áine Wall from scoring all game. At the end of the first half there was nothing separating the sides, with a score line of Mayo 0–5 - 0–4 Waterford. Six minutes into the second half and Mayo were pulling away, with Diane O'Hora, Christina Heffernan, Sabrina O'Bailey and Imelda Mullarkey scoring points to make the score 9 points to Mayo, 4 to Waterford. Waterford then mounted a comeback scoring 4 unanswered to make the score 9 points to 8. But Mayo didn't appear rattled by the comeback and scored the next 3 points. O'Hora hit her fifth and Costello scored the final point of the game, to take the win and Mayo's first All-Ireland.

=== Match Report ===
3 October 1999
1999 Senior Ladies All-Ireland Final

Report

| Mayo | 0-12 (12) – 0-08 (8) | Waterford |
|---|---|---|
(HT: 0-5-0-4)
| Pts: D O'Hora 5 (2fs), C Heffernan 4 (4fs), S Bailey 1, I Mullarkey 1, S Costello 1. | | Pts: G O'Ryan 3, C Ryan 2 (1f), N Barry 2, J Torpey 1. |

Croke Park, Dublin
Referee: Finbar O'Driscoll (Dublin)
Attendance: 15,000

For pictures of the event, see here.

=== Post-Match ===
Mayo captain Diane O'Hora lifted the cup on the old Hogan Stand, the last person to lift a trophy on the legendary stand before it was demolished that same day. Mayo's starting line-up featured four 16-year-olds, two 17-year-olds, three 18-year-olds, a 19-year-old, a 20-year-old, a 21-year-old goalkeeper, two 22-year-olds and one 23-year-old. First substitute in, Orla Casby brought the number of 16-year-olds up to five, second substitute Shelly Gibbons was only 15 and Mayo had a further three 15-year-olds on the bench. Mayo players Denise Horan, Marcella Heffernan, and Christina Heffernan all received All-Star awards for the 1999 season.

- Diane O'Hora said in an interview post-match: "After we got the first score, we were just so relaxed throughout the game - not over confident but there was a real belief there. We just had nothing to lose coming up here and it showed."
- John Mullin post-match: "Personally, this feels amazing . . . here I am, middle aged and suddenly a manager of a Mayo team that has won an All-Ireland. But this is a remarkable young team. There was much made of the fact that they hadn't been to Croke Park before but it wasn't something that bothered us."
- Michael Ryan post-match: "Even with two minutes to go, I though we might get a goal but, ah it wasn't happening for us. That's the way of it and take nothing from Mayo, they were great today."

When asked how she was feeling post-match, Marcella Heffernan replied cheerfully - "I don't want to leave, I could stay here forever."

==== Reflections ====
“On Monday night, we returned as champions to the overwhelming embrace of a county overcome with pride and emotion. If playing in Croke Park was a dream come true, that was heaven itself.”

— Denise Horan, 2009

“I will never forget 1999, the homecoming especially. The reception we got was unbelievable and being captain for that occasion made it extra memorable. But it's only looking back on it now that I really appreciate it.”

— Diane O'Hora, 2010

“There was huge excitement and huge enjoyment. And to be fair to the county, when the girls came home on the Monday night, the turnout in Mayo was unreal. The men's team had lost, and we went to places like Claremorris where there was about 4,000 or 5,000 people there waiting for the girls.”

— Finbar Egan, 2017

“We lost seven All-Ireland semi-finals in a row and then, just to get over the line …We knew we were up against Waterford; they were the team of the 1990s to beat. Just to win the first one … it was unbelievable. When we won it, the support from the county that came out to meet us, you couldn't possibly forget.”

— Christina Heffernan, 2019

== 2000 ==
=== League ===
Mayo won their first league title in 2000, defeating Tyrone in the final by 1–11 to 2–06.

=== Temporary Resignations ===
On 22 February, selector Jonathan Mullin resigned from his position in the Mayo management team, stating that football 'was no longer top of the agenda' of the Mayo county board: 'Unfortunately in the past couple of months, the football part has been re-graded and is no longer even near the top of people's agendas, people at all levels of the set-up in Mayo, and I don't intend to work with these people.' Jonathan's father and co-manager John Mullin and Finbar Egan resigned the following day, stating their 'extreme unhappiness' with the county board. In response, the Mayo senior panel issued a statement saying they would walkout if Jonathan, John and Finbar were not persuaded by the county board to stay on, with Sinead Costello stating that 'A lot of players have come to their own decision that if Finbarr (Egan) is not there this year, then they won't play.' The resignee's were in time reinstated as the Mayo's managers, and led Mayo into the 2000 league and championship campaigns.

== The 2000 All-Ireland Senior Ladies' Championship Final ==
=== The Build-Up ===
Mayo beat Tyrone in Croke Park in the semi-final of the 2000 championship campaign/ Though it was a close game for the first half and at one point Tyrone led by 7 points, Cora Staunton scoring 3–06 and Diane O'Hora getting 2–1 led to Mayo being the eventual winners, a final score of 5–10 to 2–12. Waterford beat Meath in the semi-final by a score line of 1–17 to 0–08 at Parnell Park to book their place in the final. The 2000 final was a repeat of the 1999 final, with Mayo and Waterford contesting, and Waterford were looking for revenge for their 1999 loss.

==== Build-Up Quotes ====
- Ian O'Riordan predicted 'the title should stay in the west.'
- Ireland on Sunday - 'Waterford look a banker in final fling.'
- RTÉ predicted a Mayo win.

=== Starting Teams ===
| Managers: John Mullin & Finbar Egan Team: 1 Denise Horan; 2 Nuala O'Shea; 3 Helena Lohan; 4 Niamh Lally; 5 Orla Casby; 6 Assumpta Bohan; 7 Yvonne Byrne; 8 Marcella Heffernan; 9 Rachel Barrett; 10 Maria Staunton (c); 11 Christina Heffernan; 12 Claire Egan; 13 Diane O'Hora; 14 Cora Staunton; 15 Sabrina Bailey Substitutes: Denise McDonagh for Sabrina Bailey (38 mins); Martha O'Malley for Maria Staunton (49 mins); Imelda Mullarkey for Orla Casby (50 mins). | Manager: Michael Ryan Team: 1 Sarah Hickey; 2 Marion Troy; 3 Noirin Walsh; 4 Olivia Condon; 5 B. Hannigan; 6 Martina O'Ryan; 7 Julie Ann Torpey; 8 Anna-Lisa Crotty; 9 Mary O'Donnell; 10 Rebecca Hallahan (c); 11 Claire Ryan; 12 Catriona Casey; 13 Mary O'Rourke; 14 Niamh Barry; 15 Geraldine O'Ryan Substitutes: Aoife Murphy for Catriona Casey (35 mins); T. White for B. Hannigan (54 mins) |

=== The Game ===
The 2000 All-Ireland final was played in very poor conditions, with wind and rain making ball handling awkward for both teams. Waterford's Mary O'Donnell opened the scoring with a controversial point: to everyone except the umpires, the shot appeared wide. Both teams traded scores in the first few minutes but neither side looked dominant. Cora Staunton scored a goal after 23 minutes, picking up a loose ball and rifling it into the net. Despite this both teams continued to trade points before the end of the first half.

Mayo were 1–3 to 0–5 up at the half.

The second half started with a series of four unanswered Waterford points - from Anna-Lisa Crotty, Aoife Murphy, Claire Ryan and Geraldine O'Ryan. With 40 minutes gone Waterford led 0–9 - 1–4. 12 minutes into the second half Mayo were awarded a penalty and Yvonne Byrne scored from the spot to make it 0–9 to 2–4. Julie Ann Torpey levelled the game with a point in the 53rd minute. Cora Staunton then scored a point to go one ahead, and 20 seconds later scored a goal. The goal in the last few minutes of the game was from 55-yards, with the ball dipping unexpectedly for Waterford keeper Sarah Hickey, under the crossbar and into the net. Diana O'Hora later recalled "I think the Waterford goalkeeper believed it was going wide, or over the bar, and she was very surprised that it was a goal." Waterford were now 4 points behind. Points by Mary O'Rourke, Geraldine O'Ryan and a Rebecca Hallahan free reduced the deficit to just one point. Mayo's Rachel Barrett blocked a shot in the last few minutes to deny Waterford an equalising point. With 5 seconds left on the game clock, Waterford's cornerback Marion Troy had a chance to equalise but put the shot wide, resulting in Mayo winning by a point, 3–06 to 0–14, and winning their second All-Ireland in as many years.

=== Match Report ===
1 October 2000
2000 Senior Ladies All-Ireland Final

Report

| Mayo | 3-06 (15) – 0-14 (14) | Waterford |
|---|---|---|
(HT: 1-3-0-5)
| Gls: C Staunton 2, Y Byrne 1 (pen); Pts: C Staunton 2 (1fs), D O'Hora 1, C Heffernan 1, M Heffernan 1, A Bohan 1. | | Pts: C O'Ryan 3, C Casey 3 (3 fs), R Hallahan 2 (1fs), J Torpey 1, A Crotty 1, M O'Donnell 1, M O'Rourke 1, A Murphy 1. |

Croke Park, Dublin
Referee: Christy Haughney (Carlow)
Attendance: 14,995

For pictures of the event, see here.

=== Post-Match ===
Cora Staunton was named player of the match with a final tally of 2–2. Captain Maria Staunton lifted the Brendan Martin cup for Mayo. Mayo players Denise Horan, Marcella Heffernan, Helena Lohan, Christina Heffernan, Diane O'Hora, and Cora Staunton all received All-Star awards for the 2000 season.

- Jonathan Mullin post-match: "They're an unbelievable group of players. As a team, they're much more mature than a year ago, physically stronger and a year older."
- Michael Ryan post-match: "Mayo got the breaks and took them, they showed what they were made of. Any team that wins two All-Irelands in a row is a great team . . . but I'm very proud of my team, they fought tooth and nail."
- Cora Staunton post-match: "Our backs did tremendous work, but, knowing them from having to mark them in training, I know that they're the best backs in the country. They're all class, every single one of them and it is brilliant, personally and for the whole panel, to win this one, to win back-to-back All-Irelands.
- Diane O'Hora (in reference to her Mayo teammates) post-match: "I've never seen such determination and strength in all my life. They were fantastic."

The Connacht Telegraph published the following on 4 October 2000:

"MIGHTY, MIGHTY, MAYO! You went, you saw and you have conquered once again. For the second year running, you have brought great honour and glory to the county by winning the All-Ireland senior football championship. In so doing, the Mayo ladies have now emulated the great men's 1950/51 senior team which won back-to-back All-Irelands."

==== Reflections ====
We had an outstanding team when you look back on it, a super team. Right from Denise Horan in goals, she was probably one of the best goalkeepers of that era, to Nuala O’Shea, who probably never got the credit she deserved and finished football very early, to Helena Lohan and the two Heffernan sisters who were massive players for decades. Obviously then we had a pretty potent forward line in the likes of Diane [O'Hora], and Marcella [Heffernan] played a little bit in the forwards. We had young ones as well in the likes of Sabrina Bailey; we just had a very, very good mix. But it probably all came down to we were all training really hard and we were very united.

— Cora Staunton, 2020

== 2001 ==
=== League ===
Mayo reached the semi-final of the 2001 league campaign, where they lost to Tyrone.

=== Championship ===
Mayo's championship campaign began in the semi-final, where they faced Clare in Ballinasloe. A close game for much of the match, Mayo eventually edged out Clare with a final score line of 1–11 to 0–09. In the All-Ireland final Mayo faced Laois. Laois got off to the better start and at point in the first half led by 5 points before Mayo came back into the game. A goal by Clare Egan led to a Mayo lead and a half time score of 1–10 to 1–08. In the second half both sides exchanged points with Christina Heffernan, Diane O'Hora and Cora Staunton all getting on the scoresheet. In the final minute the sides were level at 2–14 to 1–16, but on a kick-out Mayo goalkeeper Denise Horan kicked the ball to Staunton within her own 20 metre line, resulting in a free-kick to Laois. Laois scored and ended up winning the game by a single point, a final score of 2–14 to 1–16. Mayo players Denise Horan, Marcella Heffernan, Christina Heffernan, and Cora Staunton all received All-Stars for the 2001 season.

== 2002 ==
=== League ===
Mayo were runners up in the Division 1 league campaign of 2002, where they lost to Waterford.

== The 2002 All-Ireland Senior Ladies Championship Final ==
=== The Build Up ===
Mayo defeated Dublin 2–9 to 1–8 in the semi-final to book their place in the final. Monaghan beat Waterford in the semi-final by a final score line of 2–11 to 3–07. Monaghan and Mayo each battled for a third All-Ireland senior title in their history. Mayo lost the 2001 final to Laois by a single point, and were looking for redemption and their third title in 4 years.

==== Build Up Quotes ====
John Mulligan of Mid-West Radio stated "Mayo will be desperate to exorcise the ghost of last year's heart breaking defeat to Laois, while Monaghan will be out to reconfirm themselves as kingpins of ladies football."

=== Starting Teams ===
| Manager: Finbar Egan Team: 1 Denise Horan; 2 Nuala O'Shea; 3 Helena Lohan; 4 Mary T. Garvey; 5 Claire O'Hara; 6 Yvonne Byrne; 7 Edel Biggins; 8 Claire Egan; 9 Edel Reilly; 10 Jackie Moran; 11 Emma Mullin; 12 Christina Heffernan (c); 13 Ciara McDermott; 14 Marcella Heffernan; 15 Cora Staunton Substitutes: Sharon McGing for Claire O'Hara (33 mins); Triona McNicholas for Emma Mullin (38 mins); Rachel Barrett for Yvonne Byrne (54 mins) | Manager: Micky Morgan Team: 1 Martina Gray; 2 Christian O'Reilly; 3 Mary Croarkin; 4 Una McNally; 5 Lavinia Connolly; 6 Jenny Greenan; 7 Maria Lavelle; 8 Ciara Mulligan; 9 Caitriona Brady; 10 Edel Byrne; 11 Niamh Kindlon (c); 12 Aisling Tierney; 13 Orla Callan; 14 Brenda McAnespie; 15 Diane Dempsey Substitutes: Anita O'Reilly for Lavinia Connolly (15 mins); Therese McNally for Diane Dempsey (49 mins); Ciara McGuinness for Orla Callan (49 mins); Slainey Murray for Brenda McAnespie (55 mins) |

=== The Game ===
Monaghan started the 2002 final by scoring the first point of the game. Mayo responded by scoring 4 quick points to take the advantage. Points were exchanged between the two teams, with Cora Staunton scoring 4 in the first half. Monaghan's Edel Byrne finished off a 50-meter solo with a brilliant goal two minutes before the half. Byrne's effort was followed by two quick points from Brenda McAnespie and Niamh Kindlon. Despite this Mayo were still in the game, and half time the score was 0–7 to 1–5 in Monaghan's favour. Niamh Kindlon got the first point of the second half. Gradually, the staunch work of Edel Biggins, Claire Egan, Edel Reilly, Christina Heffernan, Marcella Heffernan and Staunton began to pay off. Marcella Heffernan scored an equalising point in the 40th minute. With ten minutes remaining, the sides were level at 1–7 to 0–10. Monaghan's Ciara Mc Guinness scored a point to go 1–08 to 0–10 ahead. Staunton responded with a point to level the game again. Late in the match, Triona McNicholas scored a point to take the lead, and Denise Horan made a crucial save in the final few seconds to maintain Mayo's lead. Mayo managed to hang on after this and win their 3rd All-Ireland in four years, a final score line of 0–12 to 1–08.

=== Match Report ===
29 September 2002
2002 Senior Ladies All-Ireland Final

Report

| Mayo | 0-12 (12) – 1-08 (11) | Monaghan |
|---|---|---|
(HT: 0-7-1-5)
| Pts: C Staunton 8 (5 fs), M Heffernan 2, C Heffernan 1, T McNicholas 1. | | Gls: E Byrne 1. Pts: N Kindlon 4, A Tierney 2, B McAnespie 1, C McGuinness 1. |

Croke Park, Dublin
Referee: Marty Duffy (Sligo)
Attendance: 22,783

For photos of the event, see here.

=== Post-Match ===
Marcella Heffernan was named player of the match. Mayo Captain Christina Heffernan lifted the trophy on the new Hogan stand that had just been opened. Former Mayo captain Diane O'Hora had previously lifted the 1999 title on the old Hogan stand the day it was to be demolished. Mayo players Helena Lohan, Claire Egan, Christina Heffernan, and Cora Staunton all received All-Star awards for the 2002 season.

- Triona McNicholas - "I didn't know what was going on. I ran on to a good pass from Cora Staunton and just went for it, thankfully it went over."
- Finbar Egan - "This game was going to be a close one from the start, but when the game needed it, our experience counted."

==== Reflections ====
"As a group, we'd reverted to the all-in attitude of 1999, and Christina Heffernan captained us brilliantly."

— Cora Staunton, 2018

"Winning the All-Ireland with Mayo (in 2002), they're memories that we will treasure forever."

— Sharon McGing, 2018

== 2003 ==
=== Remembrance ===
The excitement of reaching a 4th all-Ireland in 5 years was marred by the tragic death of Mayo player Aisling McGing at the age of 18. Aisling and her sisters Sharon and Michelle had all been part of the Mayo panel which had won the All-Ireland in 2002.

Aisling is described below by those that knew her:

- Finbar Egan - "Aisling was a lovely footballer but she was an even nicer girl."
- Beatrice Casey - Aisling was "fun-loving" and "always having the craic."
- Sharon McGing - "Aisling was such a bubbly person anyway that if you lost a game, she'd be trying to cheer you up. If you were in bad form, she was trying to cheer you up."
- Cora Staunton - "Aisling was a star on our Mayo minors team. More than that, she was a friend – someone I could imagine myself still being good friends with today. She had a great sense of devilment in her. She was witty and beautiful."
- Father Pat Donnellan - "Aisling was a beautiful young girl."
- Father Tommy McGing - "There was always something unique in her personality. She had that little swagger when she entered a place - always ready with a mischievous smile that could turn a dungeon into a place of laughter. Like the prophet of old she seemed to have an extra portion of God's spirit."

In honour of her memory, the U21 Ladies Football Championship was renamed the 'Aisling McGing U21 Championship,' and the Aisling McGing Memorial Cup is played annually on the may bank holiday in Carnacon. Surprisingly, both Sharon and Michelle McGing played in the Connacht final and the All-Ireland final, just two months after their sisters passing. They each played with a laminated photo of Aisling in their sock.

== The 2003 All-Ireland Senior Ladies' Championship Final ==
=== The Build Up ===
Mayo defeated Roscommon in the first round of the Connacht championship by a score line of 3–13 to 0–06. In the Connacht final, Mayo defeated Galway, a final score of 3–16 to 1–12. Mayo beat Galway in the semi-final 1–11 to 1–09. Mayo beat Dublin in the semi-final of 2002, so Dublin were out for revenge in 2003. Dublin beat Kerry 0–12 to 0–8 in the semi-final. This was Dublin's first All-Ireland final in their history, and Mayo were looking to capture their 4th title in 5 years.

==== Build Up Quotes ====
- Finbar Egan - "Dublin are a quick, physical team. They have an excellent fitness regime and have a lot of time invested in weights. The game has the potential to be cynical."
- Gavin Cummiskey of The Irish Times predicted "Dublin will be all fired up to give a good account of themselves, but Mayo are expected to record another back-to-back All-Ireland win."

=== Starting Teams ===
| Manager: Finbar Egan Team: 1 Denise Horan; 2 Nuala O'Shea; 3 Helena Lohan (c); 4 Sharon McGing; 5 Mary T. Garvey; 6 Yvonne Byrne; 7 Claire O'Hara; 8 Clare Egan; 9 Jackie Moran; 10 Emma Mullin; 11 Christina Heffernan; 12 Michelle McGing; 13 Diane O'Hora; 14 Marcella Heffernan; 15 Cora Staunton Substitutes: Martha Carter for Jackie Moran (39 mins). Annette Gallagher for Emma Mullin (53 mins) Edel Reilly for Marcella Heffernan (60 mins). | Manager: Mick Bohan Team: 1 Clíodhna O'Connor; 2 Sorcha Farrelly; 3 Louise Keegan; 4 Maria Kavanagh; 5 Niamh Hurley; 6 Martina Farrell (c); 7 Orla Colreavy; 8 Angie McNally; 9 Niamh McEvoy; 10 Elaine Murphy; 11 Gemma Fay; 12 Bernie Finlay; 13 Mary Nevin; 14 Louise Kelly; 15 Karen Hopkins Substitutes: Elaine Kelly for Elaine Murphy (28 mins). Aisling McCormack for Karen Hopkins (47 mins). Sinéad Aherne for Bernie Finlay (47 mins). |

=== The Game ===
A game played in poor weather, the 2003 final began slow with both defences putting up solid performances, Helena Lohan being particularly dominant in the full-back position. Both teams traded points, with Diane O'Hora scoring two points, and Michelle McGing and Emma Mullin getting 1 each to leave Mayo up by two at the half, 0–04 to 0–02. In the second half Dublin got slightly more into the game, scoring 3 unanswered points to put them into the lead. Mayo put on a tough defensive display for most of the second half, with Christina Heffernan and Claire Egan both receiving yellow cards fouls. In injury-time Mayo were losing by a point 0–05 to 1–04. Cora Staunton got a free about 60 metres from the goal, and dropped the ball high into the Dublin box. The Dublin keeper, attempting to catch the ball, dropped it into the hands of Diane O'Hora who turned onto her left foot and scored a goal. It was the last kick of the game, and Mayo won in dramatic fashion, a final score line of 1–04 to 0–05.

=== Match Report ===
5 October 2003
2003 Senior Ladies All-Ireland Final

Report

| Mayo | 1-04 (7) – 0-05 (5) | Dublin |
|---|---|---|
(HT: 0-4 - 0-2)
| Gls: D O'Hora 1. Pts: D O'Hora 2, E Mullins 1, M McGing 1. | | Pts: A McNally 1 (1f), G Fay 1, M Nevin 1, K Hopkins 1, S Aherne 1. |

Croke Park, Dublin
Referee: Eugene O'Hare
Attendance: 30,000

For photos of the event, see here.

=== Post-Match ===
Mayo Captain Helena Lohan lifted the 2003 All-Ireland senior trophy, the 4th different Mayo captain to do so in 5 years (1999 - Diane O'Hora, 2000 - Maria Staunton, 2002 - Christina Heffernan). Mayo players Nuala O'Shea, Helena Lohan, Christina Heffernan, and Michelle McGing all received All-Star awards for the 2003 season.

- Mick Bohan (in reference to his Dublin side) - "What this group have done is phenomenal. They were honest and brave out there and maybe in some way we are winners . . . we just didn't win a football match."
- Finbar Egan - "The only match we've lost in five years in the Championship was against Laois two years ago. It wasn't a great performance but we'll win a bad one rather than lose a good one. Those McGing girls, this was a hard day for them and they came out and gave everything for us."

==== Reflections ====
“The final whistle was pure relief and shock. Unreal. I fell to the ground even though I told myself not to in the event of us winning. The pitch invasion was incredible. Mayo supporters are just amazing; they just never let us down. They're always there for us."

— Helena Lohan, 2003

"It was the first time ever in my intercounty career that I didn't register a single score in a game, but I didn't care. Sure I was disappointed in my own performance, but you'll take that kind of win any day."

— Cora Staunton, 2018

“I suppose there was so much emotion going through our heads after the game. It was hard to be there but it was amazing to have won that year in memory of Aisling.”

— Sharon McGing, 2018

"I just remember Cora taking the free and it landing...to Diane (O'Hora), I don't know how she managed to get the ball into the net...and then kinda going 'Oh my God, we actually won this."

— Michelle McGing, 2020

== 2004 ==
=== Jersey Controversy ===
A dispute over jerseys began in 2003 when Mayo, who were contracted to wear jerseys made by the company Azzurri for the 2003 season, were told by the Ladies Gaelic Football Association (LGFA) to wear O'Neill's jerseys for both the semi and all-Ireland finals, as the association had secured a general contract with the company. Mayo defied this request however, playing with tape over the O'Neills logo's on the jerseys in the semi-final, and wearing the full Azzurri kit in the final. At the beginning of 2004 Mayo were issued with a 2,000 euro fine for the semi-final incident and a 20,000 euro fine by the LGFA for wearing the jerseys in the final. For the next 2 months, Mayo contested the fines, and an independent arbitrator was brought in, who recommended concessions. Reductions in fines and alternative jersey agreements were agreed verbally, but a miscommunication led the LGFA to infer a lack of acceptance of the recommendations, resulting in the association voting to ban Mayo from the 2004 championship, stating "This decision came about after the failure by the Mayo Ladies County Board to accept the terms of an independent mediator after a lengthy mediation process." Mayo later appealed the vote and after months of dispute, the LGFA reinstated Mayo into the championship.

=== League ===
Mayo began the 2004 league campaign against Galway in Headford in poor weather conditions. Despite a goal from Diane O'Hora and points from Cora Staunton Mayo went in at half time behind, 1–05 to 1–02. In the second half Galway only scored 1 point and Yvonne Byrne scored a penalty to give Mayo the win with a score of 2–06 to 1–06. Mayo next played Kerry where they conceded 3 goals and lost the match by a score line of 3–05 to 0–09. In round 3 Mayo faced Cork. Mayo outperformed Cork in most areas of the field, with Claire O'Hara at half-back particularly effective at stopping Cork attacks, and scores from Staunton, Ciara McDermott, O'Hora, Emma Mullin, Martha Carter, and Marcella Heffernan led to a comprehensive Mayo victory of 2–13 to 1–08. In the semi-final of the league Mayo beat Waterford to qualify for the league final, again playing Cork in the final. Cork started better than Mayo in the first half and went into half-time with a 6-point lead. In the second half Mayo took over, with Staunton scoring 1–09 and O'Hara, Nuala O'Shea and Helena Lohan shutting down the Cork forwards, eventually winning the match with a final score of 1–14 to 1–11 and winning their second league title in Mayo's existence.

=== Championship ===
Mayo began their championship campaign in the Connacht final against Galway. Galway started well and went 3 points up early in the game, with Staunton responding with 2 scores to go into half-time with a score of 0–06 to 0–02 to Galway. In the second half Mayo scored no points to Galway's 10, leading to a comprehensive Galway victory with a final score line of 0–16 to 0–02. Despite this loss, Mayo clawed their way back through the rounds, defeating Cork in the quarter-finals, to set up a semi-final clash with Galway again. A final tally of 1–08 for Staunton was only good enough for a draw however, a final score of 1–10 to 1–10. The replay was another close match, but Galway eventually won by 1 point, 3–10 to 3–09, knocking the defending champions Mayo out of the competition. Three Mayo players, Helena Lohan, Claire Egan, and Cora Staunton received All-Star awards for the 2004 season. At the end of the 2004 season, Finbar Egan stepped down as the manager of Mayo.

== 2005 ==
=== League ===
In January 2005, Con Moynihan took over as the new Mayo manager. Mayo began the defence of their 2004 league title with a 2–11 to 2–08 victory over Monaghan. Mayo next played Galway in Tuam, winning with a score line of 2–07 to 1–06. On 27 February Mayo lost to Kerry by 1–13 to 0–08. Mayo next played Cork, and despite scores from Cora Staunton, Christina Heffernan and Ciara McDermott, Cork just edged out Mayo with a final score of 2–10 to 2–09. At the end of the group stages, Mayo had won 3 games and lost 2, finishing 3rd and qualifying for the quarter-finals. In the quarter-finals Mayo faced Waterford on 27 March. In a tightly contested match, the sides were even at the end of full-time, but in extra-time Waterford edged out Mayo with a final score of 2–10 to 3–08, knocking Mayo out of the competition. At the beginning of April, Con Moynihan stepped down as Mayo manager, replaced by the junior Mayo management team of Stephen Bourke, Danny Fahey, Noel Kearney, and Tommy Walsh, until the end of 2005.

=== Championship ===
In the 2005 championship campaign Galway beat Mayo in the Connacht championship final. Regardless, Mayo managed to reach the semi-final of the 2005 campaign against Cork. Despite leading at half-time by 1–05 to 0–05 and a player of the match performance from Claire Egan, Mayo lost to Cork, a final score line of 0–13 to 1–09, knocking them out of the competition. Claire Egan was the only Mayo to receive an All-Star award in the 2005 season. Charlie Lambert became the new Mayo manager in 2006.

== 2006 ==
=== League ===
In the 2006 league campaign, Mayo comfortably qualified for the quarter-finals, beating Tyrone 3–07 to 1–09, and goals from Annette Gallagher and Cora Staunton led to a victory over Armagh, 2–13 to 2–07. In the quarter-final, Mayo face Monaghan in Ballina. Mayo led by 2–06 to 0–06 at half-time, and a final tally of 1–08 by Staunton led to Mayo getting the win, 4–11 to 1–11. In the semi-final, Mayo faced Meath in Ratoath on 23 April. A closely contested match for most of the game, Meath eventually won the game by one point, a final score line of 1–13 to 2–09, knocking Mayo out of the competition.

=== Championship ===
In the 2006 championship campaign, Mayo first played in the Connacht final against Galway. Both sides were even early on before Galway started to pull away, but a goal from Marcella Heffernan kept Mayo in touch at the half, 2–07 to 1–05. Though both teams traded scores throughout, Galway maintained their lead and ended up eventual winners, 2–12 to 1–13. In the quarter-final, Mayo were pitted against defending champions Cork at O'Moore Park. Mayo got off to a good start, with a Triona McNicholas goal putting Mayo ahead at the half, 1–06 to 1–04. In the second half, Cork's defence shut down Mayo and Staunton, who was eventually sin-binned, and Cork managed to take the lead late in the game. Getting another goal in the second half, Cork eventually edged out Mayo with a final score line of 2–12 to 1–11, knocking Mayo out of the competition. At the end of the 2006 season, Charlie Lambert stepped down as the manager of Mayo, replaced by Frank Browne in January 2007.

== 2007 ==
=== League ===
In the first two rounds of the 2007 Division 1 League Campaign, Mayo lost to Armagh and drew with Laois. Mayo got their first win against Waterford, with Cora Staunton scoring 2–07 for a final score line of 5–14 to 2–05. Mayo next beat the previously undefeated Kerry with a final score of 0–12 to 1–07, booking their place in the quarter-finals. Mayo's final game in the group stage was against Tyrone, where goals from Fiona McHale, Staunton and Michelle Ruane led to a comprehensive victory, 3–09 to 0–03. In the quarter-final Mayo were drawn against Meath. Mayo dominated the game, with Lisa Cafferkey and Staunton both getting two goals each, a final score of 4–18 to 0–09. In the semi-final Mayo defeated Cork, who lost their 32-game winning streak. In the final Mayo faced Connacht rivals Galway at Dr. Hyde Park. A goal from Cafferkey and points for Staunton, Ciara McDermott, McHale, and Diane O'Hora secured a comfortable victory for Mayo with a final score line of 1–13 to 0–06, securing their first Division 1 league title since 2004.

=== Championship ===
On 6 May, Mayo contested for the Connacht championship against Galway. Players like Martha Carter, Diane O'Hora and Christina Heffernan dominated parts of the game, and a 9-point tally from Cora Staunton and a goal from Lisa Cafferkey propelled Mayo to victory with a final score line of 1–11 to 0–06. For the 2007 group championship stages, Mayo were drawn in group 2 with Kerry, Waterford and Dublin. Mayo first played Waterford, where a Staunton final tally of 1–11 led to a comfortable final victory for Mayo, 1–19 to 0–08. Mayo next played Kerry in Cusack Park, and again a high 9 point tally from Staunton and a solid Mayo defence led to a decisive win of 0–16 to 0–07, already securing a place in the quarter-final. In the final group game Mayo played Dublin. A comprehensive first half led to the score being 1–08 to 0–03 at the interval. Dublin came into the game in the second half but Mayo managed to keep a healthy lead throughout, a final score of 1–13 to 0–10. In the quarter-final Mayo played Monaghan in torrential rain in Mullingar. Mayo were missing stalwart Marcella Heffernan, who broke her wrist in the Dublin game. The first half was close, but Mayo led the game at half time by 1–06 to 1–05. In the second half Mayo pulled away slightly, and though Monaghan hit the post late in the game, Mayo managed to hang with a final score of 1–12 to 1–07. In the semi-final Mayo faced Tyrone. A hard-fought game in the first half, Staunton had a penalty saved only to react quickest and put the rebound into the goal. The half-time score was 1–05 to 1–05. The second half remained close, but Mayo eventually pulled away with a final score line of 2–13 to 2–08, booking their place in their first championship final since 2003. In the 2007 championship final, Mayo were pitted against Cork, who were going for 3 consecutive final wins in a row. Cork started the game better, building a 5-point lead in the early minutes. Mayo got their first point through Caroline McGing in the 20th minute. Claire O'Hara's dominant display in the midfield got Mayo slightly back in the game, but a goal for Cork led to a half-time lead of 1–06 to 0–03. In the second half Cork maintained a healthy lead throughout, and despite late goals from Staunton and Fiona McHale, Cork comprehensively won the match, a final score of 2–11 to 2–06. Mayo's Claire O'Hara and Cora Staunton were both awarded All-Star awards for the 2007 season.

== 2008 ==
=== League ===
Mayo began the defence of their 2007 league title win in 2008 against Kerry without a manager and short of key players like Christina Heffernan, Diane O'Hora and Cora Staunton. As a result, Mayo were badly beaten by Kerry, conceding 4 goals in a game they never looked like winning. Michael Ryder was hired as the new Mayo manager at the end of February. Mayo next played Armagh, where they were beaten 2–06 to 4–08. Mayo got their first win of the campaign against Wexford in Enniscorthy. A shootout form start to finish, points from Lisa Cafferty, Fiona McHale, Aoife Herbert, Deirdre Doherty and Patricia Coyle led to Mayo getting the victory, a final score of 0–13 to 0–10. Mayo won only 1 of their first 4 games and therefore did not finish high enough in the league to make the semi-finals.

=== Championship ===
In the Connacht final of 2008, Mayo defeated Sligo in MacHale Park by a score line of 3–15 to 0–09, with Cora Staunton scoring 2–08. In the quarter-final Mayo faced Kerry. The game was even for the first half and the sides were level twice with Martha Carter dominating the midfield, before a Staunton goal put Mayo ahead, and at half time the score was 1–08 to 0–08. Mayo were 7 points ahead with 20 minutes remaining but Kerry slowly chipped away with points, and in the end Mayo just managed to hold on to take the win by a single point, 2–12 to 1–14. In the semi-final Mayo faced Monaghan. The game was even for most of the first half, with the sides level 5 times throughout the game, and at half-time there was only a point between the teams. Despite a final tally of 1–09 for Staunton, Monaghan pulled away in the second half and with eight minutes remaining Monaghan got a goal to seal the win and knock Mayo out of the competition, a final score of 2–16 to 1–12. Cora Staunton was the only Mayo player to receive an All-Star for the 2008 season. At the beginning of 2009 Michael Ryder was let go as the Mayo manager, though the reason as to why was never cited.

== 2009 ==
=== League ===
Kevin Reidy's Mayo began their 2009 league campaign against Tyrone in Trillick. Tyrone led by 1–5 to 0–4 at the half, and despite a Cora Staunton tally of 1–05, Tyrone held on to claim victory, 1–09 to 1–07. In round 2 Mayo faced Kerry in Ballinrobe. Goals from Cora Staunton (2), Sinéad Cafferky and Claire Egan led to a decisive 20 point win for Mayo, 5–11 to 0–06. In round 3 Mayo faced Donegal. Goals from Lisa Cafferkey and Fiona McHale and a Staunton 8 point tally proved too much for Donegal, and Mayo picked up the victory with a final score line of 4–13 to 2–13, qualifying them for the quarter-finals. In the quarter-finals Mayo were pitted against Clare in Cooraclare. A closely contested game for the first half, a goal by Sinéad Cafferky put Mayo ahead at the half 1–06 to 1–04. In the second half, Staunton got a goal and converted a penalty to eventually edge out Clare with a final score line of 3–12 to 1–07 and reach the semi-finals. In the semi-final, Mayo were drawn against Laois. Mayo were slow off the mark against Laois, trailing 0–06 to 0–01, before Emma Mullin got her first of 3 goals, finally finishing with a tally of 3–03 to lead Mayo to a 6-point win and into the league final. In the final, Mayo faced defending champions Cork in Kiltoom. A great save by Yvonne Byrne was not enough to hold back Cork who appeared to score points at ease, comfortably getting the win with a score line of 1–20 to 0–11 and defending their title.

=== Championship ===
Mayo's 2009 Championship contention began with the Connacht final on 5 July in Charlestown. Though Mayo got off to a good start Galway appeared to look the dominant team throughout, and after both Triona McNicholas and Emma Mullin were sin-binned, Galway pulled away in the second half, outscoring Mayo in the second half by 1–07 to 0–03. The final score read Galway 3–17 to Mayo's 2–08, and Galway claimed their first Connacht title since 2006. Having lost the provincial title, Mayo were put into the qualifiers against Laois. Mullin scored 1–06 and Staunton 12 points, and though Laois made a comeback in the second half, Mayo pulled away late in the game to get the win, 2–19 to 1–15. Mayo next played Tyrone in the quarter-finals in Ballymahon where 3 goals helped Mayo just edge out the game with a final score line of 3–09 to 1–12. In the semi-final Mayo faced the defending All-Ireland champions Cork. Staunton shot 1–07 in the game but Cork, just like in the league, seemed to be unstoppable, as 3 goals proved the difference and got Cork the win, a final score of 3–10 to 1–09, knocking Mayo out of the competition. At the beginning of 2010 Kevin Reidy stepped down as the manager of Mayo, replaced by Pat Costello in January 2010. Noelle Tierney, Martha Carter and Cora Staunton all received All-Star awards for the 2009 season.

== 2010 ==
=== League ===
For the 2010 season the national football league was changed from 3 divisions of 12 to 4 divisions of 9, with the top 4 teams in each division playing in the semi-finals. Mayo were put into Division 1. Mayo beat Tyrone 2–12 to 3–07 in round 2, and beat 2009 All-Ireland finalists Dublin by 1–12 to 0–12, with Cora Staunton scoring 10 of Mayo's points. Monaghan got the best of Mayo in Emyvale on 7 March by a score line of 0–17 to 1–09. Going into the final game Mayo had to beat Cork to advance to the semi-finals, but were decisively beaten 1–22 to 0–06.

=== Pulled Out of Championship ===
On 19 April, Pat Costello resigned as Mayo manager, stating that his position was 'no longer tenable due to (being) constantly undermined by certain players within the panel. On 20 May the Mayo county board voted 26–5 to withdraw Mayo from the championship, 'in order to deal with this problem properly in the long-term interest of ladies football.' On 2 June the Mayo county board upheld an appeal to the decision by a vote of 28–9. On 11 June the Ladies Gaelic Football Association announced its intention to hold an inquiry into the matter, but after weeks of negotiations the Mayo county board upheld its position. On 5 July 3 clubs from Mayo - Carnacon, Castlebar and Knockmore, appealed the decision to the central council on the grounds that under the rulebook 'county boards must send forward a team for inter-county adult championships.' As a result, the central council 'overwhelmingly voted that the Mayo Ladies County Board must enter a team (in the championship).' As a result, Mayo were put back into the championship, into the qualifiers against Kerry.

=== Championship ===
Mike Murphy became the interim manager while the Mayo county board found a replacement for Pat Costello. Despite a tumultuous few months for the Mayo team and a lack of serious training, the championship qualifiers began against Kerry in Banagher. The first half was closely contested and at half-time the score was 5 points each. Despite a final tally of 1–06 for Cora Staunton, Kerry chipped away points and won a hard-fought game by 1 point, 0–12 to 1–08, knocking Mayo out of the championship.

== 2011 ==
=== League ===
The Mayo senior team under Jason Taniane began with the Division 1 league campaign in 2011. Mayo played their first game on 13 February in Claremorris against Monaghan where they were resoundingly beaten by 3–13 to 1–08. In round 2 Mayo played Laois in Ballyheane and again were beaten, 2–12 to 1–06. In round 3 Mayo fared no better, losing to Cork by 10 points, 2–17 to 2–07. Round 4 saw Mayo face their Connacht rivals Galway, and though the game was close for large parts, Galway came out on top with a final score line of 1–14 to 1–11. Mayo travelled to Fr Tierney Park in Ballyshannon for round 5 where they were again defeated by Donegal, 3–04 to 1–08. Mayo's luck didn't improve for round 6 and despite a 1–07 haul from Cora Staunton, Mayo were beaten by two points by Tyrone, 3–10 to 3–08, and relegated to Division 2. Mayo's final match of the league campaign on 3 April resulted in a 2–14 to 2–11 win for Kildare, completing a full league campaign of losing for Mayo (0W, 0D, 7L).

=== Championship ===
Mayo defeated Galway in the 2011 Connacht championship by a score line of 5–11 to 2–15, with goals from Cora Staunton, Fiona McHale and Carol Hegarty getting the win for Mayo. Mayo's championship contention began and ended on 13 August in the quarter-final against Kerry in St. Brendan's Park. Mayo trailed by 1–06 to 0–06 at half-time but only managed 1 point in the second half, letting Kerry pull-away and eventually win with a score line of 3–11 to 0–10. At the end of the 2011 campaign Peter Taniane stepped down as the manager of Mayo, replaced by Mike Murphy and Jimmy Corbett for the 2012 campaign.

== 2012 ==
=== League ===
Mayo's 2012 Division 2 league campaign began on 5 February in Tuam against Galway, where Mayo comfortably won the game by a final score of 3–14 to 1–07. In round 2, Mayo were victorious against Clare in Ballindine, scoring 2–11 to 0–08. Round 3 saw Mayo travel to Waterford, where they eventually came out on top in a close game, 3–13 to 3–10. Mayo next faced Tipperary in round 4 where, after a hard-fought match, finished the game with a 2–12 to 2–08 win. In round 5 Mayo faced Fermanagh in Kinawley, and with the sides evenly matched the game ended in a 2–11 to 1–14 draw. Mayo next faced Kerry in Claremorris where they narrowly won by a two-point margin, 1–09 to 1–07. The final round saw Mayo face Cavan in Mullahoran, a game which Mayo never looked like losing, with a final score of 1–16 to 1–09, finishing the group stage in 1st (6W, 1D, 0L). For the semi-final Mayo played against 4th place Kerry and 4 goals scored proved decisive with Mayo winning by 4–06 to 1–07 to reach the Division 2 final. In the final Mayo face Connacht rivals Galway in Parnell Park. Galway had the early lead before Mayo fought back to make the score 0–08 to 1–05 at the half. In the second half Triona McNicholas scored a goal to put Mayo 1–09 to 1–05 clear after 37 minutes, and with Cora Staunton scoring a further two goals and Fiona McHale getting another Mayo came out on top with a final score line of 4–17 to 2–07, earning promotion to Division 1 for the 2013 league campaign.

=== Championship ===
The 2012 championship qualifiers began for Mayo against Tyrone on 12 August at St. Brendan's Park, Birr. Despite hitting 18 wides throughout the game, Cora Staunton scored 3–11 to convincingly beat Tyrone 3–12 to 1–04. In the quarter-finals Mayo were pitted against league champions Monaghan on 25 August in Dr. Hyde Park. Aileen Gilroy hit the crossbar in the second minute of the game, and in response Monaghan scored a goal in the 5th minute. At half time the score was 1–08 to 0–05 for Monaghan. In the second half Monaghan extended their lead and despite goals from Staunton and Gilroy, Monaghan responded with 3 goals of their own, a deficit that Mayo could not come back from. The final score was Monaghan 4–15 to Mayo's 2–14, knocking Mayo out of the competition. Cora Staunton received Mayo's only All-Star of the 2012 season. At the end of 2012 Frank Murphy and Jimmy Corbett stepped down as Mayo joint managers, and Peter Clarke was hired for the start of the 2013 season.

== 2013 ==
=== League ===
Peter Clarke began his tenure as Mayo manager with the 2013 league campaign. A tally of 1–09 for Cora Staunton and 1–1 for Aileen Gilroy led to a 2–15 to 1–09 Mayo victory against Donegal in Claremorris. Mayo were defeated by Laois after a hard-fought game in Stradbally, a final score line of 4–09 to 2–10. Mayo were again defeated by Monaghan in round 4 of the league by 1–15 to 2–06 in Aughnamullan. Mayo were beaten by Cork in round 5 of the league campaign with a final score line of 2–10 to 1–11. Mayo placed 4th by the end of the 2013 league campaign, defeating Dublin in the final game by a score line of 1–10 to 0–08. In the semi-final Cora Staunton scored all of Mayo's 1–10 to beat 1st place Monaghan 1–10 to 0–09 in Ballinamore to advance to the league final. Mayo played Cork in the league final but registered 10 wides and went 17 minutes in the second half without scoring a point, eventually losing by a score line of 0–14 to 0–07.

=== Championship ===
Mayo's 2013 Championship began at Pearse Park, where Westmeath were comfortably beaten by a score-line of 5–11 to 0–11, with Cora Staunton scoring 4–08. On 24 August, Mayo played Kerry in the quarter-finals in Birr. Despite a Staunton tally of 1–09, Deirdre Doherty scoring 1–1 and being up by two points with less than ten minutes remaining, Mayo conceded three late scores to lose by a point, 2–14 to 2–13, knocking Mayo out of the championship. Mayo's Yvonne Byrne and Cora Staunton were awarded All-Stars for the 2013 season.

== 2014 ==
=== League ===
Mayo's round 1 2014 Division 1 league campaign began on 2 February in Mallow where they were narrowly defeated by Cork, 1–10 to 1–08. Mayo next travelled to Healy Park in Omagh to face Tyrone where they decisively defeated Tyrone by 5–17 to 0–04. In round 3 Mayo faced off against Dublin in Ballyheane, County Mayo where they were defeated by Dublin by a score line of 2–12 to 2–09. In round 4, Mayo comfortably beat Laois at home by 7–10 to 0–09. On 9 March, Mayo next travelled to Donegal where they won by 1 point, 2–17 to 4–10. In round 6 Mayo travelled to Kerry where they never really looked in the game, a win for Kerry with a final score line of 4–15 to 0–10. Mayo's final game of the division stages was against Monaghan in Ballina where a close game ended in a Mayo win, 0–12 to 0–09. Mayo ended the campaign 5th, not a high enough finish to get into the semi-finals (4W, 0D, 3L).

=== Championship ===
The 2014 championship for Mayo began in the qualifiers against Westmeath on 9 August. Though Westmeath trailed by nine points at one point in the first half, they managed a comeback to level the game with minutes left in the game. However, a Cora Staunton tally of 2–06 and a late free from Mayo clinched the win, a final score line of 3–08 to 1–13. In the quarter-final Mayo were pitted against the defending champions Cork in O'Moore Park in Tullamore. Despite being close for large parts of the game and heroics by Helena Lohan to stop a ball on the goal line from going in, Cork eventually edged out Mayo in the second half, a final score of 1–15 to 0–09, knocking Mayo out of the competition. At the end of the 2014 season Peter Clarke stepped down as the Mayo manager. Frank Browne was appointed the new manager for 2015.

== 2015 ==
=== League ===
Frank Browne's Mayo started their 2015 league campaign at Swinford Community Park on 1 February, losing 2–13 to 1–08 against Cork. Round 2 saw Mayo travel to Mountmellick to play Laois, where Mayo were comfortable winners with a score line of 1–14 to 0–05. In round 3 Mayo outscored Dublin by 0–13 to 0–08 to win at DCU St. Clares. Mayo next returned to Swinford where they defeated Tyrone by 0–12 to 1–04, but lost in round 5 to Monaghan in Blackhill by a score line of 3–12 to 1–08. Mayo's round 6 encounter with Kerry at MacHale Park resulted in a 3–15 to 2–13 loss, and this was followed on 12 April by a defeat to Galway, 2–06 to 1–16, in Ballina. Based on these results Mayo placed 6th overall in Division 1 (3W, 0D, 4L).

=== Championship ===
Mayo's 2015 championship campaign kicked off with the provincial championship against Galway. Despite Cora Staunton scoring 1–15 and a Galway player getting sin binned, Mayo still ended up the losers, narrowly defeated by a point, 0–21 to 1–17. Losing the provincial championship, Mayo were put into the qualifiers where they beat Tyrone comfortably by 4–25 to 0–03, with Staunton again amassing a huge tally of 2–10. In the quarter-finals Mayo travelled to the Gaelic Grounds to face Kerry. Despite a close game in the first half, Kerry scored 2–10 in the second to knock Mayo out of the competition with a final score line of 2–13 to 1–08. Cora Staunton was the only Mayo recipient of an All-Star award for the 2015 season.

== 2016 ==
=== League ===
Mayo's 2016 Division 1 league campaign began on 31 January with a win against Cork in Mallow, 2–08 to 0–7. Round 2 saw Mayo face Dublin in Swinford Amenity Park where Mayo narrowly got the win with a final score line of 2–09 to 2–07. Round 3 saw Mayo travel to Tuam to face Galway, where Mayo won by 1 point, 2–08 to 1–10. Round 4 was back to Swinford where Mayo comfortably beat Armagh 4–17 to 1–13. Mayo next travelled to Fitzgerald Stadium to face Kerry, again winning by a small margin of 2–08 to 2–06. Round 6 was held in Killyclogher where Mayo decisively defeated Tyrone by a score line of 1–13 to 0–05. Mayo's final game of the group stage was against Monaghan in Ballina where they pulled off a 2–11 to 1–09 victory and a clean sweep of Division 1 (7W, 0D, 0L). In the semi-final Mayo played 4th place Kerry in Birr, where they pulled off a narrow victory of 1–16 to 2–12 to reach the league final. The final was played on 7 May in Parnell Park between Mayo and Cork. Though the teams were evenly matched for large periods of the game and despite Cora Staunton scoring 6 points, a goal by Cork was the difference between the two sides and the game ended with Cork as winners, 1–10 to 0–10.

=== Championship ===
The 2016 All-Ireland Championship began with the provincial final, which was played on 3 July between Mayo and Galway. Galway were going for 5 Connacht titles in a row, but a Cora Staunton total tally of 2–14 led to Mayo comfortably beating Galway 3–20 to 0–14. As provincial champions Mayo were automatically put into the quarter-finals against Leinster runners-up Westmeath. The sides were even in the first half before a goal by Doireann Hughes put Mayo ahead, but the match was close right up until the final whistle, where Mayo managed to hang on for a 2–10 to 1–11 victory. In the semi-final Mayo went up against the 2015 All-Ireland runners-up Dublin. Dublin controlled the first half and looked well in control with a half time scoreline of 2–06 to 0–06. In the second half however Mayo had come back from an 8-point deficit to be level, but with the final kick of the game Dublin scored a free-kick to win the match and knock Mayo out of the competition, a final score of 2–10 to 1–12. Fiona McHale was the only Mayo player to receive an All-star award for the 2016 season.

== 2017 ==
=== League ===
Mayo began their 2017 Division 1 league campaign on 29 January with a round 1 loss to Galway, 1–10 to 2–08, at Swinford Amenity Park. Round 2 saw Mayo lose to Monaghan in St. Tiernach's by a score line of 3–09 to 1–14, but Mayo bounced back in round 3 with a 3–14 to 0–18 victory over Armagh in Clonmore. Round 4 in Swinford brought Mayo back to losing ways with a 3–09 to 1–08 defeat at the hands of Cork. Mayo next played Dublin in Croke Park and narrowly pulled out the win with a score line of 1–11 to 1–10. Mayo followed this up with another win against Kerry in Swinford, 3–09 to 2–11, but ended the campaign with a 4–13 to 2–11 loss to Donegal, leaving Mayo 5th overall in the league and not high enough placed to qualify for the semi-finals (3W, 0D, 4L).

=== Championship ===
The Connacht championship took place on July the 2nd 2017 in MacHale Park. Mayo conceded 3 goals in the first half and were soundly beaten by Galway, 3–12 to 1–08. As a result of the loss, Mayo were entered into the qualifiers against Kildare. 1–11 from Cora Staunton, 1–4 from Sarah Rowe and 1–3 from Grace Kelly led Mayo to a comfortable victory, 3–20 to 0–8. The quarter final's pitted Mayo against Donegal, where goals by Staunton, Kelly and Niamh Kelly led Mayo to a tough but decisive 3–14 to 2–11 victory. In the semi-final, Mayo played the six-in-a-row champions Cork. The first half was level 5 times, with Staunton scoring a goal in the 25th minute. Despite this Cork were ahead by two points at the half, but in the second half 2 quick goals from Aileen Gilroy and Amy Dowling put Mayo in the lead. Cork did come back, and a late penalty save from Mayo keeper Yvonne Byrne was a major let-off for Mayo, but a Staunton tally of 1–09 proved too much for Cork and Mayo hung on to reach the All-Ireland final with a score of 3–11 to 0–18 for the first time since 2007.

Mayo's opponent for the 2017 final was Dublin who were runners up in the championship the past 3 years. Mayo began the All-Ireland final well and the game was even until the 18th minute when Dublin scored a goal. Mayo's Yvonne Byrne and Rachel Kearns both got yellow cards in the first half, but points from both Niamh Kelly and Grace Kelly led to a half time score of 1–06 to 0–6. In the second half Mayo never got within 3 points of Dublin despite Staunton's final tally of 7 points, and impact substitutions midway through the second half led to 3 late goals by Dublin and their first All-Ireland final win since 2010, with a score line of 4–11 to 0–11. 3 players from Mayo received All-Star awards for the 2017 season; Sarah Tierney, Aileen Gilroy and Cora Staunton. At the end of the 2017 season, Franke Browne stepped down as the Manager of Mayo, replaced by coach Peter Leahy.

== 2018 ==
=== League ===
Peter Leahy's Mayo side began their 2018 Division 1 League Campaign on 28 January with a 0–11 to 0–7 victory over Westmeath in Swinford Amenity Park. Round 2 saw Mayo face off against Kerry in Brosna. Kerry beat Mayo with a score line of 2–14 to 2–06. However, it was later found that Kerry had fielded an unregistered player, thereby awarding the points to Mayo. In round 3 Mayo defeated Galway by 2–7 to 1–7 at Pearse Stadium. In round 4 Mayo were narrowly defeated by Dublin by a score line of 0–12 to 2–08 in MacHale Park. On 25 March Mayo played Cork in Mallow, narrowly losing by one point, 1–12 to 2–08. Mayo next played Donegal in Swinford, winning by a margin of 5–14 to 4–12. Mayo's final game of the group stage against Monaghan resulted in a 6–11 to 3–11 victory for Mayo, placing Mayo 3rd in the table and therefore qualifying for the semi-finals. In the semi-final Mayo saw off the defending league champions Cork 1–20 to 3–12 with Sarah Rowe scoring 9 points and Grace Kelly scoring 7. The final pitted Mayo and Dublin against each other in a repeat of the 2017 All-Ireland final. This match however was not as competitive as 2017 and Dublin comfortably won with a score line of 3–15 to 1–10 in Parnell Park.

=== The Walkout ===
Between 5 and 10 July, 12 Mayo players and 2 coaches walked out of the panel ten days before the championship game against Cavan citing 'player welfare issues that are personal and sensitive to the players involved.' Players who left included Mayo Captain Sarah Tierney, Vice-Captain Fiona McHale, four time all-Ireland winner Cora Staunton, and stalwarts Martha Carter and Marie Corbett. 8 of the players that left the panel played for women's club Carnacon. The county board defended the Mayo management team and gave them their full support, stating 'the senior management team has adhered to all protocols and guidelines set out at the beginning of their tenure...they have our full support going forward.' A mediation process occurred between members of the county board, management team, players who left the panel and players who were still with the panel, but talks were unsuccessful and the players remained out of the panel, signing a confidentiality agreement to not discuss the details of the mediation process. On 22 August, in response to the 8 Carnacon players leaving the Mayo panel, a vote of 26–2 by other Mayo clubs voted to banish Carnacon from the Mayo championship citing the team had 'brought the association into disrepute.' Carnacon appealed the decision to the Connacht council successfully and were reinstated into the Mayo championship.

On 4 September, the remaining Mayo ladies football squad issued a statement, saying 'we believe that no player welfare issues exist or have ever existed under the current management and categorically disagree with the statement issued in July by the individuals that departed the Mayo senior ladies panel.' The same day the Mayo clubs again voted in favour, 30–3, to appeal the decision of reinstating Carnancon into the Mayo championship. On 6 September, Cora Staunton denied allegations of an 'attempted coup' being orchestrated by the players who left the panel, stating 'The environment for us wasn't right within the county set-up, we didn't feel it was a safe environment to be in so we decided to leave.' In response, Peter Leahy appeared on a podcast stating that Staunton's comments were 'slanderous,' and that "some of the players weren't happy with my selection, simple as that...we only had nine players from the All-Ireland last year playing, that was a problem to a lot of them...it was 'oh my feelings are hurt.' It was a feelings situation."

Five days later the players who left the panel organised a press conference and released a statement, saying 'our issues related to a lack of communication, being undermined, intimidated, feeling isolated and eventually helpless in the entire situation...we appreciate that not every player may have experienced or witnessed these issues and also we appreciate that a number of us did not address these fully with the rest of the Mayo panel...despite this, many of the remaining panel did attend a players meeting on Saturday 7 July and did agree that there were issues at play...our issues were broader and deeper and dismissing them as ‘feelings’ is extremely unhelpful and careless. We made a decision for ourselves, as amateur players, who absolutely love our sport, to step away from it. This decision was not taken lightly and our intention was never to cause upset for anyone rather to protect the well-being of each other...what does the reaction say to people who want to ever speak up, who ever want to raise an issue that this is how we handle it? We must be able to tell all players that their opinions, their feelings and their experiences matter.'

Responding to these comments, the Mayo LGFA stated that they believed the walk-out was 'an orchestrated move designed to make the management of Peter Leahy untenable due to sheer weight of numbers leaving the panel...a move designed to wrestle control of the senior team from the management and but for the steadfastness of Peter Leahy, the existing Mayo panel and the County Board it would have succeeded.' This statement was never corroborated with evidence. None of the players who left the panel played for Mayo again while Peter Leahy was manager.

=== Championship ===
The 2018 senior championship began for Mayo with the Connacht final against Galway in MacHale Park. Despite 6 points from Cora Staunton and a Fiona Doherty goal that put Mayo within a point with 10 minutes remaining, late points from Galway led to resulted in a loss for Mayo, with a final score line of 0–17 to 1–12. For the group stages, a new round robin format was introduced. The 12 teams were drawn into 4 groups of 3 teams, with each group containing one provincial champion, one provincial beaten finalist, and one beaten provincial semi-finalist (two each from Munster and Ulster). Each team plays each other once, and the top 2 finishers in the groups play in the quarter-final. Mayo were grouped with Leinster champions Dublin and Cavan. Mayo first played Cavan in St. Tiernach's Park on 14 July. Grace Kelly scoring 2–06 and Sarah Rowe getting 1–07 lead to a Mayo victory, 3–23 to 4–13. Mayo next faced off against Dublin for the second time in 2018. The loss of players due to the walkout really showed in this match, with Dublin winning comfortably 3–11 to 1–08 in Dr. Hyde Park. Nevertheless, Mayo qualified second overall in their group, and faced Galway in the quarter-final. A repeat of the Connacht final but with a depleted side, Galway beat Mayo comfortably 5–11 to 0–12, knocking Mayo out of the competition.

== 2019 ==
=== League ===
Mayo's league campaign in 2019 got off to a good start with a 2–11 to 0–12 win over Tipperary in Swinford Amenity Park on 3 February. This was followed by a round 2 loss of 3–10 to 2–07 to Donegal, a round 3 loss of 1–17 to 3–09 to Dublin, and a round 4 loss of 1–11 to 0–08 to Galway. Mayo got their second win of the campaign in round 5 with a 3–12 to 2–12 victory against Westmeath in Cusack Park. Cork in round 7 proved to be too strong an opponent, losing 2–05 to 4–15 at MacHale Park. Mayo finished the 2019 league campaign with a 2–15 to 2–15 draw with Monaghan, leaving them 5th in Division 1 overall (2W, 4L, 1D).

=== Championship ===
The 2019 championship began with the Connacht final between Mayo and Galway in MacHale Park. Though Galway were ahead for most of the match, Mayo managed to score three goals in the second half to end the game in a draw, Mayo 3–06 to Galway's 1–12. The replay, held in the Gaelic Grounds resulted in a 3–07 to 0–9 defeat to Galway. For the All-Ireland campaign, Mayo were pooled in Group 4 with Tyrone and Donegal. Mayo's first game was against Tyrone on 13 July, with a close 3–14 to 3–11 victory for Mayo in Omagh. Mayo's second game against Donegal on 27 July resulted in a 1–22 to 3–12 victory for Mayo, putting them top of Group 4. Finishing first in group 4, Mayo played the second seed in group 1, Armagh, in the quarter final. Mayo came out on top with a 2–12 to 1–12 victory in Pearse Park on 10 August. In the semi-final, Mayo went up against Connacht rivals Galway in Croke Park. The match was even for most of the game, with Rachel Kearns scoring 1–02 and Niamh Kelly 1–1, but a free-kick scored in the 58th minute by Galway resulted in a one-point loss of 2–10 to 2–09, knocking Mayo out of the competition. Rachel Kearns was awarded an All-Star for the 2019 campaign.

== 2020 ==
=== League ===
The 2020 league campaign started for Mayo on 26 January with a 4–07 to 2–09 win over Donegal at Swinford Amenity Park. On 1 February Mayo lost to Dubin 0–07 to 0–12 in round two at MacHale Park. Round three was held in Swinford Amenity Park where Mayo beat Waterford 0–06 to 0–02. On 1 March Mayo lost to Cork in round 3 by 1–12 to 1–04. On 8 March Mayo played Westmeath again in Swinford, beating them by 0–10 to 2–0. On 12 March, due to the emerging threat of the COVID-19 pandemic, the LGFA suspended all Gaelic activity at club, county and educational levels. On 24 March, the LGFA decided to cancel the league and declare the results null and void. Mayo placed 3rd overall in the Division 1 league as a result.

=== Championship ===
On 8 May it was announced that the championship would be delayed and reformatted for later in the year. On 21 July the championship was rescheduled for late October. The format change saw four groups of three playoff against each other, with the winners playing the semi-finals. Mayo were put into Group 4, grouped with Armagh and Tyrone. Mayo's 2020 Senior Football Championship campaign began on 7 November in Páirc Sheáin Mhic Dhiarmada against Tyrone. A final tally of 2–09 for Sarah Rowe and goals from Tamara O'Connor and Deirdre Doherty sealed a comprehensive victory, 4–17 to 0–04. On 14 November Mayo played Armagh. Despite points from Grace Kelly, Aileen Gilroy, Rowe, Sinead Cafferky, Doherty, Mary McHale and Fiona Doherty, Mayo were beaten by Armagh by a score line of 4–12 to 1–16, knocking them out of the competition in the group stage.

== 2021 ==
In January 2021, Mayo manager Peter Leahy stepped down after three years in charge to become a part of the U20 Meath backroom team. Michael Moyles was announced as the new Mayo manager at the end of January.

=== Management Team ===
| Position | Name |
|---|---|
| Manager | Michael Moyles |
| Maor Foirne | Marita McDonald |
| Physio | Rachel Tierney |
| FLO | Vera Carey |
| Mentor | Aiden McLoughlin |
| Mentor | Tom Carney |
| Mentor | Terry Kennedy |
| Mentor | Michael Schlingerman |
| Mentor | Dr. Lisa Cunningham |
| Mentor | Barry Loftus |

=== League ===
In April 2021, Mayo were drawn in Division 1A of the 2021 Ladies' National Football League with Galway, Donegal and Westmeath. In round 1, Mayo faced Galway on 22 May in MacHale Park. Despite Mayo losing a 6-point lead at one stage in the game, 1–3 from Rachel Kearns, 6 points from Shauna Howley and points from nine different scorers led Mayo to a late comeback and a hard-fought one point victory, a final score line of 2–15 to 2–14. In round 2, Mayo travelled to Ballybofey to face Donegal on 29 May. Donegal started the game well and took an early lead, but a resurgence from Mayo led to a 1-point lead at the half, 0–7 to 0–6. The game was close for much of the second half before Donegal were awarded and converted a penalty, putting the game beyond Mayo's reach, a final score line of 1–11 to 0–11. In round 3, Mayo faced Westmeath in Mullingar on 6 June. Going into the match, if Galway beat Donegal in the other group game, Mayo would have to defeat Westmeath by such an amount that they would both make up a double digit deficit and end up with a higher points difference than Galway, but if Donegal won the game Mayo only had to beat Westmeath. Mayo were dominant for most of the game, with goals from Kearns, Tara Needham, Amy Dowling and Ciara Needham and points from 7 different scorers led to a comfortable victory, a final score line of 4–18 to 0–06. In the other game Donegal defeated Galway, placing Mayo second in Group 1A and qualifying for the semi-finals (2W, 0D, 1L).

In the Division 1 league semi-final, Mayo faced the defending 2020 All-Ireland Champions and Group 1B winners Dublin on 12 June at the LIT Gaelic Grounds in Limerick. Despite Niamh Kelly scoring the first point of the game, Dublin responded with 3 goals in the first half leading to a commanding half-time score line of 3–03 to 0–4. In the second half, Mayo were unsuccessful in mounting a comeback and Dublin pulled away on the scoring sheet with a final score line of 4–15 to 0–10, knocking Mayo out of the competition.

==== Starting XV's ====
2021 Mayo LGFA Squad (Rd. 1 League Campaign) vs. Galway

Starting Team

- 1. Laura Brennan
- 2. Orla Conlon
- 3. Kathryn Sullivan
- 4. Tamara O'Connor
- 5. Éilís Ronayne (c)
- 6. Clodagh McManamon
- 7. Ella Brennan
- 8. Fiona McHale
- 9. Mary McHale
- 10. Niamh Kelly
- 11. Shauna Howley
- 12. Sinéad Cafferky
- 13. Maria Reilly
- 14. Rachel Kearns
- 15. Lisa Cafferky

Substitutions

- 16. Aisling Tarpey
- 17. Sadhbh Larkin
- 18. Marie Corbett
- 19. Ciara Whyte
- 20. Ciara Needham
- 21. Tara Needham
- 22. Grace Kelly
- 23. Amy Dowling
- 24. Ava Lambert
- 25. Deirdre Doherty
- 26. Ava Keane
- 27. Saoirse Lally
- 28. Saoirse Walsh
- 29. Amy Halligan
- 30. Allanah Duffy

2021 Mayo LGFA Squad (Rd. 2 League Campaign) vs. Donegal

Starting Team

- 1. Aisling Tarpey
- 2. Éilís Ronayne
- 3. Clodagh McManamon (c)
- 4. Ella Brennan
- 5. Tamara O'Connor
- 6. Orla Conlon
- 7. Marie Corbett
- 8. Niamh Kelly
- 9. Sinéad Cafferky
- 10. Fiona McHale
- 11. Shauna Howley
- 12. Kathryn Sullivan
- 13. Deirdre Doherty
- 14. Rachel Kearns
- 15. Lisa Cafferky

Substitutions

- 16. Laura Brennan
- 17. Sadhbh Larkin
- 18. Maria Reilly
- 19. Ciara White
- 20. Ciara Needham
- 21. Tara Needham
- 22. Grace Kelly
- 23. Amy Dowling
- 24. Ava Lambert
- 25. Mary McHale
- 26. Ava Keane
- 27. Saoirse Lally
- 28. Saoirse Walsh
- 29. Amy Halligan
- 30. Fiona Doherty

2021 Mayo LGFA Squad (Rd. 3 League Campaign) vs. Westmeath

Starting Team

- 1. Aisling Tarpey
- 2. Amy Halligan
- 3. Clodagh McManamon
- 4. Fiona Doherty
- 5. Éilís Ronayne
- 6. Maria Reilly
- 7. Kathryn Sullivan
- 8. Tamara O'Connor (c)
- 9. Ciara Whyte
- 10. Niamh Kelly
- 11. Tara Needham
- 12. Grace Kelly
- 13. Amy Dowling
- 14. Shauna Howley
- 15. Rachel Kearns

Substitutions

- 16. Laura Brennan
- 17. Sadhbh Larkin
- 18. Roisin Durkin
- 19. Ella Brennan
- 20. Ciara Needham
- 21. Marie Corbett
- 22. Ava Keane
- 23. Orla Conlon
- 24. Deirdre Doherty
- 25. Mary McHale
- 26. Fiona McHale
- 27. Saoirse Lally
- 28. Saoirse Walsh
- 29. Lisa Cafferky
- 30. Sinéad Cafferky

2021 Mayo LGFA Squad (Div. 1 Semi-Final) vs. Dublin

Starting Team

- 1. Laura Brennan
- 2. Saoirse Lally
- 3. Clodagh McManamon (c)
- 4. Orla Conlon
- 5. Éilís Ronayne
- 6. Tamara O’Connor
- 7. Kathryn Sullivan
- 8. Fiona Doherty
- 9. Sinéad Cafferky
- 10. Niamh Kelly
- 11. Fiona McHale
- 12. Grace Kelly
- 13. Maria Reilly
- 14. Shauna Howley
- 15. Rachel Kearns

Substitutions

- 16. Aisling Tarpey
- 17. Sadhbh Larkin
- 18. Roisin Durkin
- 19. Ella Brennan
- 20. Ciara Needham
- 21. Marie Corbett
- 22. Deirdre Doherty
- 23. Amy Halligan
- 24. Ciara Whyte
- 25. Mary McHale
- 26. Tara Needham
- 27. Amy Dowling
- 28. Saoirse Walsh
- 29. Ciara McManamon
- 30. Sorcha Murphy

==== Group Results ====
Key to colours
| Advance to Division 1 Semi-Finals |
| Relegation Playoff |

| Team | Pld | W | D | L | Group Points | Score Difference |
|---|---|---|---|---|---|---|
| Donegal | 3 | 3 | 0 | 0 | 9 | +28 |
| Mayo | 3 | 2 | 0 | 1 | 6 | +22 |
| Galway | 3 | 1 | 0 | 2 | 3 | +1 |
| Westmeath | 3 | 0 | 0 | 3 | 0 | -51 |

==== Scoring List ====
| Player | Club | Club Colours | Goals | Points | Total Points |
|---|---|---|---|---|---|
| Shauna Howley | Knockmore | | 0 | 19 | 19 |
| Rachel Kearns | Mac Hale Rovers | | 2 | 11 | 17 |
| Grace Kelly | Moy Davitts | | 0 | 7 | 7 |
| Tamara O'Connor | Cill Chomáin | | 0 | 4 | 4 |
| Amy Dowling | Carnacon | | 1 | 0 | 3 |
| Ciara Needham | Louisburgh | | 1 | 0 | 3 |
| Maria Reilly | Cill tSeadhna | | 1 | 0 | 3 |
| Niamh Kelly | Moy Davitts | | 0 | 3 | 3 |
| Sinéad Cafferky | Kilmovee Shamrocks | | 0 | 3 | 3 |
| Tara Needham | Louisburgh | | 1 | 0 | 3 |
| Fiona McHale | Carnacon | | 0 | 2 | 2 |
| Kathryn Sullivan | Castlebar Mitchels | | 0 | 2 | 2 |
| Deirdre Doherty | Charlestown Sarsfields | | 0 | 1 | 1 |
| Fiona Doherty | Moy Davitts | | 0 | 1 | 1 |
| Mary McHale | Kilmoremoy | | 0 | 1 | 1 |

==== 2021 League Statistics ====
| 2021 | League Statistics |
|---|---|
| Games | 4 |
| Total Score | 72 points |
| Goals | 6 |
| Points | 54 |
| 1st Half (Total Score) | 39 points |
| Avg Pts (1st Half) | 9.75 points |
| 2nd Half (Total Score) | 33 points |
| Avg Pts (2nd Half) | 8.25 points |
| No. of Scoring Players | 15 |
| Top Scorer(s) | Shauna Howley (0–19) 19 pts |

=== Championship ===
On 20 May, the draw was made for the 2021 All-Ireland Senior Ladies' Football Championship. Mayo were put into Group A with Armagh, Monaghan and Cavan. In round 1, Mayo began their championship campaign against Cavan on 10 July in Markievicz Park, Sligo. Mayo looked comfortable for most of the game, leading by 1–09 to 0–05 at half time, and with 8 different scorers ran out as eventual winners, a final score line of 1–18 to 0–15. In round 2, Mayo faced Monaghan on 17 July in Ballinamore. Mayo started the game well scoring the first 2 points, but Monaghan came right back into the game, putting successful pressure on Aisling Tarpey's kick outs throughout the first half. At half time the score line was 0–6 to 0–6.The game was tight for most of the 2nd half with both teams trading scores and both defences keeping the scoring list low, but neither side could get themselves in front and regular time ended with a score line of 0–10 to 0–10. In the first half of extra time the excellent defending continued, with the half time extra time score being 0–12 to 0–11. In the second half of extra time, Monaghan were the only scorers, putting the sides level at the end of extra time, 0–12 to 0–12, and into 30 metre free-kicks. In the Free-Kicks, Shauna Howley was the only player on either team to convert their chance, and as a result Mayo ended up overall winners of the free kicks 1–0, and overall winners of the match 0–13 to 0–12. On 24 July Mayo played Armagh in round 3 in Ballinamore. An early goal for Armagh put Mayo on the backfooot, but Mayo kept themselves in the game with 3 points from Grace Kelly and 1 from both Howley and Sarah Rowe. At half time the score was 1–08 to 0–06. Despite a promising start in the second half, two Armagh goals, several points and 3 yellow cards for Mayo proved too high an obstacle to overcome, leading to a final score line of 3–14 to 0–12, placing Mayo second in group 1 but still through to the quarter-finals (2W, 0D, 1L).

In the quarter-final, Mayo faced Galway on 2 August in MacHale Park. Mayo's first half performance was clinical on both sides of the ball, with 5 different players scoring a total of 1–10, and registering only 1 wide. At half-time the score line was 1–10 to 0–05. In the second half, Galway slowly shot their way back into the game, and with 5 minutes to go the sides were only separated by 3 points. In the final three minutes, Mayo's excellent defending and a late score from Lisa Cafferky secured the victory for Mayo, a final score line of 1–15 to 1–11. In the semi-final, Mayo faced Dublin on 14 August in Croke Park. Dublin started the game well, scoring the first four points, but goals from Sarah Rowe and Rachel Kearns kept Mayo in touching distance throughout the first half. At half-time the score-line was 1–10 to 2–01. In the second half, both teams matched each other for points throughout, and despite Lisa Cafferky hitting the post, points from Kearns, Cafferky, Shauna Howley and Grace Kelly, and Mayo making several other chances, Dublin maintained their lead to the end, a final score line of 1–17 to 2–09, knocking Mayo out of the competition. Rachel Kearns was awarded an All-Star for the 2021 season.

==== Starting XV's ====
Mayo Starting XV (Group 1 Rd. 1 Championship) vs Cavan

Starting Team

- 1. Aisling Tarpey
- 2. Saoirse Lally
- 3. Clodagh McManamon (c)
- 4. Ella Brennan
- 5. Éilís Ronayne
- 6. Tamara O'Connor
- 7. Kathryn Sullivan
- 8. Ciara Needham
- 9. Sinéad Cafferky
- 10. Fiona Doherty
- 11. Rachel Kearns
- 12. Mary McHale
- 13. Grace Kelly
- 14. Shauna Howley
- 15. Tara Needham

Substitutions Used

- Sarah Rowe for Mary McHale (33')
- Ciara Whyte for Fiona Doherty (40')
- Lisa Cafferky for Tara Needham (40')
- Saoirse Walsh for Clodagh McManamon (45')
- Orla Conlon for Ciara Needham (57')

Substitutes Not Used

- Laura Brennan
- Sadhbh Larkin
- Roisin Durkin
- Marie Corbett
- Niamh Kelly
- Amy Halligan
- Ava Keane
- Ava Lambert
- Ciara McManamon
- Aoife Geraghty

Mayo Starting XV (Group 1 Rd. 2 Championship) vs Monaghan

Starting Team

- 1. Aisling Tarpey
- 2. Saoirse Lally
- 3. Clodagh McManamon (c)
- 4. Ella Brennan
- 5. Tamara O'Connor
- 6. Éilís Ronayne
- 7. Sadhbh Larkin
- 8. Ciara Needham
- 9. Sinéad Cafferky
- 10. Sarah Rowe
- 11. Rachel Kearns
- 12. Mary McHale
- 13. Grace Kelly
- 14. Shauna Howley
- 15. Tara Needham

Substitutions Used

- Fiona McHale for Ciara Needham (2')
- Kathryn Sullivan for Sadhbh Larkin (25')
- Fiona Doherty for Tara Needham (44')
- Lisa Cafferky for Mary McHale (45')
- Marie Corbett for Ella Brennan (60')
- Aoife Geraghty for Fiona Doherty (E.T. 9')

Substitutes Not Used

- Laura Brennan
- Roisin Durkin
- Orla Conlon
- Saoirse Walsh
- Amy Halligan
- Amy Dowling
- Ava Keane
- Ava Lambert
- Ciara McManamon

Mayo Starting XV (Group 1 Rd. 3 Championship) vs Armagh

Starting Team

- 1. Aisling Tarpey
- 2. Saoirse Lally
- 3. Clodagh McManamon (c)
- 4. Orla Conlon
- 5. Tamara O'Connor
- 6. Ciara Whyte
- 7. Kathryn Sullivan
- 8. Marie Corbett
- 9. Sinéad Cafferky
- 10. Fiona McHale
- 11. Rachel Kearns
- 12. Sarah Rowe
- 13. Grace Kelly
- 14. Shauna Howley
- 15. Tara Needham

Substitutions Used

- Éilís Ronayne for Saoirse Lally (H.T.)
- Niamh Kelly for Tara Needham (35')
- Roisin Durkin for Marie Corbett (35')
- Lisa Cafferky for Tamara O'Connor (48')

Substitutes Not Used

- Laura Brennan
- Sadhbh Larkin
- Saoirse Walsh
- Amy Halligan
- Mary McHale
- Ava Keane
- Amy Dowling
- Ciara McManamon
- Aoife Geraghty
- Danielle Caldwell

Mayo Starting XV (Quarter-final) vs Galway

Starting Team

- 1. Laura Brennan
- 2. Saoirse Lally
- 3. Dayna Finn
- 4. Roisin Durkin
- 5. Tamara O'Connor
- 6. Ciara Whyte
- 7. Kathryn Sullivan (c)
- 8. Niamh Kelly
- 9. Sinéad Cafferky
- 10. Fiona McHale
- 11. Rachel Kearns
- 12. Sarah Rowe
- 13. Grace Kelly
- 14. Shauna Howley
- 15. Lisa Cafferky

Substitutions Used

- Éilís Ronayne for Ciara Whyte (33')
- Amy Dowling for Sarah Rowe (43')
- Maria Reilly for Shauna Howley (47')
- Danielle Caldwell for Kathryn Sullivan (50')
- Sarah Rowe for Rachel Kearns (57')

Substitutes Not Used

- Aisling Tarpey
- Sadhbh Larkin
- Marie Corbett
- Orla Conlon
- Saoirse Walsh
- Amy Halligan
- Mary McHale
- Ava Keane
- Ciara McManamon
- Aoife Geraghty
- Tara Needham

Mayo Starting XV (Semi-Final) vs Dublin

Starting Team

- 1. Laura Brennan
- 2. Saoirse Lally
- 3. Dayna Finn
- 4. Clodagh McManamon (c)
- 5. Tamara O'Connor
- 6. Roisin Durkin
- 7. Kathryn Sullivan
- 8. Fiona McHale
- 9. Sinéad Cafferky
- 10. Niamh Kelly
- 11. Rachel Kearns
- 12. Lisa Cafferky
- 13. Grace Kelly
- 14. Shauna Howley
- 15. Sarah Rowe

Substitutions Used

- Ciara Whyte for Roisin Durkin (34')
- Ciara Needham for Fiona McHale (54')
- Tara Needham for Lisa Cafferky (54')
- Maria Reilly for Shauna Howley (59')

Substitutes Not Used

- Aisling Tarpey
- Éilís Ronayne
- Orla Conlon
- Saoirse Walsh
- Amy Halligan
- Mary McHale
- Marie Corbett
- Amy Dowling
- Ciara McManamon
- Aoife Geraghty
- Sadhbh Larkin

==== Group Results ====
Key to colours
| Advance to All-Ireland Quarter-finals |

| Team | Pld | W | D | L | Group Points | Score Difference |
|---|---|---|---|---|---|---|
| Armagh | 3 | 3 | 0 | 0 | 9 | +33 |
| Mayo | 3 | 2 | 0 | 1 | 6 | -4 |
| Monaghan | 3 | 1 | 0 | 2 | 3 | -13 |
| Cavan | 3 | 0 | 0 | 3 | 0 | -16 |

==== Scoring List ====
| Player | Club | Club Colours | Goals | Points | Total Points |
|---|---|---|---|---|---|
| Shauna Howley | Knockmore | | 0 | 22 | 22 |
| Rachel Kearns | MacHale Rovers | | 2 | 16 | 22 |
| Grace Kelly | Moy Davitts | | 0 | 14 | 14 |
| Sarah Rowe | Kilmoremoy | | 1 | 7 | 10 |
| Sinéad Cafferky | Kilmovee Shamrocks | | 1 | 4 | 7 |
| Lisa Cafferky | Kilmovee Shamrocks | | 0 | 2 | 2 |
| Ciara Whyte | Kilmoremoy | | 0 | 1 | 1 |
| Fiona Doherty | Moy Davitts | | 0 | 1 | 1 |
| Tara Needham | Louisburgh | | 0 | 1 | 1 |

==== 2021 Championship Statistics ====
| 2021 | Championship Statistics |
|---|---|
| Team | Mayo |
| Games | 5 |
| Total Score | 80 points |
| Goals | 4 |
| Points | 68 |
| 1st Half (Total Score) | 44 points |
| Avg Pts (1st Half) | 8.80 points |
| 2nd Half (Total Score) | 36 points |
| Avg Pts (2nd Half) | 7.20 points |
| Wides | 39 |
| Avg Wides per Game | 7.80 wides |
| No. of Scoring Players | 9 |
| Top Scorer(s) | Shauna Howley (0–22) Rachel Kearns (2–16) |

== 2022 ==
=== Management Team ===
| Position | Name |
|---|---|
| Manager | Michael Moyles |
| Selector | Marita McDonald |
| Selector | Aiden McLoughlin |
| Physio | Rachel Tierney |
| Defensive Coach | Ger Cafferkey |
| Performance Coach | Austin O'Malley |
| Strength & Conditioning | Martin Connor |
| Liaison Officer | Dr. Lisa Cunningham |
| Liaison Officer | Stella O'Neill |

=== League ===
For the 2022 Ladies' National Football League season, Mayo were put into Division 1A alongside Donegal, Galway and Westmeath. Mayo faced Westmeath at the NUI Galway Connacht GAA Air Dome in Bekan on 12 February at 7 pm. Mayo started the game well with a goal by Maria Reilly in the 1st minute, but Westmeath quickly responded with a point and converted penalty. The game was frantic for the first 15 minutes with both sides getting scores, but over time Mayo slowly began to build up a lead. Goals for Shauna Howley, Sinead Cafferky, another for Maria Reilly and points from several players led to Mayo having a commanding lead at half-time, a score line of 4–11 to 1–05. In the second half, Mayo pulled farther ahead with goals from Laura Moran, Sinead Walsh, and Ava Keane. Mayo's substitutes had a big impact, and 11 different scorers got on the board throughout the game. Though Westmeath had some positive spells in the second half, Mayo continued to score and ran away with the game, a final score line of 7–22 to 1–12. Mayo next faced Galway away on 27 February in Tuam Stadium. The game started at pace, with a goal a piece in the first 6 minutes. Mayo had the wind advantage in the first half and they used it effectively. Mayo's counterattack was swift, and 3 goals from Sinead Walsh, Ciara Whyte, and Lisa Cafferky led to a commanding 3–3 to 1–03 score line at half time. In the second half Mayo continued the pressure, with Sinead Cafferky scoring a goal within the first 2 minutes, and Lisa Cafferky and Sinead Walsh scoring soon after. With the wind in their favour, Galway mounted somewhat of a comeback, scoring a penalty and several points, but with excellent defending Mayo ran out the game comfortable winners, a final score line of 6–06 to 2–08, booking their place in the semi-final of the division 1 league. In round 3, Mayo faced Donegal at Connacht Centre of Excellence in Bekan on 6 March. The game started slow with both sides scoring a point a piece in the first 10 minutes. Just after the first water break Sinead Walsh got the first of the game, and Mayo chipped away points after the defenders won some well fought turnovers. A turnover led to Mayo's second goal by Shauna Howley, but Donegal mounted a comeback late in the first half, scoring 1–1. This led to a halftime score line of 2–04 to 1–02. In the second half Donegal started better, scoring the first 3 points, and Mayo failed to score until the 40th minute. Playing into the wind and with the blinding sun, Mayo struggled to get scores, and by the last water break the lead was down to 2 points. Mayo got back into scoring form in the last 15 minutes however, and points from Howley and Aoife Geraghty allowed Mayo to hold on as eventual winners, a final score line of 2–04 to 1–02. This win put Mayo top of division 1A (3W, 0D, 0L) and into the league semi-finals to face the runner-up of division 1B, Meath.

In the league semi-final, Mayo faced Meath on 19 March in St. Tiernach's Park. The first half was tightly contested with both sides trading points. At half-time Mayo led by 0–7 to 0–4. In the second half Meath took over scoring 2–5 unanswered. Mayo mounted a comeback with a goal from Lisa Cafferky and several goal chances, but Meath matched scores for the rest of the game and ended up eventual winners, a final score line of 2–12 to 1–09, knocking Mayo out of the competition.

==== Starting XV's ====
2022 Mayo Senior NFL Panel

- Rachel Baines (Burrishoole)
- Danielle Caldwell (Castlebar Mitchels)
- Kathryn Sullivan (Castlebar Mitchels)
- Grainne Flynn (Castlebar Mitchels)
- Fiona McHale (Carnacon)
- Tamara O'Connor (Cill Chomain)
- Éilis Ronayne (Davitts)
- Aisling Tarpey (Foxrock/Cabinteely)
- Laura Brennan (Hollymount)
- Allanah Duffy (Hollymount)
- Ava Keane (Hollymount)
- Nicola Hession (Hollymount)
- Ciara Whyte (Kilmoremoy)
- Mary McHale (Kilmoremoy)
- Sinead Cafferky (Kilmovee Shamrocks)
- Lisa Cafferky (Kilmovee Shamrocks)
- Maria Reilly (Kiltane)
- Shauna Howley (Knockmore)
- Hannah Reape (Knockmore)
- Roisin Flynn (Knockmore)
- Nina McVann (Knockmore)
- Sarah Mulvihill (Knockmore)
- Tara Needham (Louisburgh)
- Ciara Needham (Louisburgh)
- Sinead Walsh (MacHale Rovers)
- Saoirse Lally (Westport)
- Laura Moran (Westport)
- Sherin El Massy (Westport)
- Aoife Geraghty (Westport)

2022 Mayo Starting XV (Rd. 1 League Campaign) vs Westmeath

Starting Team

- 1. Aisling Tarpey
- 2. Éilís Ronayne
- 3. Sherin El Massry
- 4. Saoirse Lally
- 5. Tamara O'Connor
- 6. Fiona McHale
- 7. Nicola Hession
- 8. Sinéad Cafferky
- 9. Aoife Geraghty
- 10. Sarah Mulvihill
- 11. Lisa Cafferky
- 12. Shauna Howley (c)
- 13. Rachel Baynes
- 14. Ciara Whyte
- 15. Maria Reilly

Substitutes

- Sinead Walsh for Sarah Mulvhill (37')
- Danielle Caldwell for Saoirse Lally (37')
- Ciara Needham for Tamara O’Connor (39')
- Laura Moran for Lisa Cafferkey (43')
- Tara Needham for Maria Reilly (43')
- Mary McHale for Éilis Ronayne (43')
- Roisin Flynn for Aoife Geraghty (43')
- Ava Keane for Ciara Whyte (47')
- Grainne Flynn for Shauna Howley (47')
- Laura Brennan for Aisling Tarpey (49')
- Hannah Reape for Rachel Baynes (50')
- Kathryn Sullivan for Fiona McHale (51')

2022 Mayo Starting XV (Rd. 2 League Campaign) vs Galway

Starting Team

- 1. Aisling Tarpey
- 2. Éilís Ronayne (c)
- 3. Sherin El Massry
- 4. Danielle Caldwell
- 5. Tamara O'Connor
- 6. Fiona McHale
- 7. Kathryn Sullivan
- 8. Sinéad Cafferky
- 9. Aoife Geraghty
- 10. Sarah Mulvihill
- 11. Lisa Cafferky
- 12. Shauna Howley
- 13. Sinead Walsh
- 14. Ciara Whyte
- 15. Maria Reilly

Substitutes

- Saoirse Lally for Éilis Ronayne (30')
- Mary McHale for Maria Reilly (35')
- Rachel Baynes for Ciara Whyte (40')
- Roisin Flynn for Tamara O’Connor (48')
- Tara Needham for Sinead Walsh (55')
- Hannah Reape for Fiona McHale (55')
- Ciara Needham for Shauna Howley (55')
- Nicola Hession for Kathryn Sullivan (58')
- Grainne Flynn for Lisa Cafferky (59')
- Laura Moran for Aoife Geraghty (59')
- Nina McVann for Diane Caldwell (59')

2022 Mayo Starting XV (Rd. 3 League Campaign) vs Donegal

Starting Team

- 1. Laura Brennan
- 2. Saoirse Lally
- 3. Roisín Flynn
- 4. Danielle Caldwell
- 5. Ciara Needham
- 6. Fiona McHale
- 7. Kathryn Sullivan (c)
- 8. Sinéad Cafferky
- 9. Aoife Geraghty
- 10. Shauna Howley
- 11. Sinéad Walsh
- 12. Sarah Mulvihill
- 13. Lisa Cafferky
- 14. Ciara Whyte
- 15. Hannah Reape

Substitutes

- Grainne Flynn for Hannah Reape (38')
- Maria Reilly for Ciara Whyte (44')
- Allanah Duffy for Aoife Geraghty (blood sub, 49')
- Ava Keane for Sinead Walsh (57')
- Nina McVann for Lisa Cafferky (59')

2022 Mayo Starting XV (Semi-final League Campaign) vs Meath

Starting Team

- 1. Aisling Tarpey
- 2. Éilis Ronayne
- 3. Roisín Flynn
- 4. Danielle Caldwell
- 5. Ciara Needham
- 6. Fiona McHale
- 7. Kathryn Sullivan (c)
- 8. Sinéad Cafferky
- 9. Aoife Geraghty
- 10. Shauna Howley
- 11. Sinéad Walsh
- 12. Sarah Mulvihill
- 13. Lisa Cafferky
- 14. Ciara Whyte
- 15. Maria Reilly

Substitutes

- Ciara Needham for Ciara Whyte (43')
- Hannah Reape for Maria Reilly (54')
- Sherin El Massry for Roisín Flynn (58')
- Tamara O’Connor for Éilis Ronayne (58')

==== Group Results ====
Key to colours
| Advance to Division 1 Semi-Finals |
| Relegation Playoff |

| Team | Pld | W | D | L | Group Points | Score Difference |
|---|---|---|---|---|---|---|
| Mayo | 3 | 3 | 0 | 0 | 9 | +41 |
| Donegal | 3 | 2 | 0 | 1 | 6 | +5 |
| Galway | 3 | 1 | 0 | 2 | 3 | +2 |
| Westmeath | 3 | 0 | 0 | 3 | 0 | -48 |

==== Scoring List ====
| Player | Club | Club Colours | Goals | Points | Total Points |
|---|---|---|---|---|---|
| Shauna Howley | Knockmore | | 2 | 14 | 20 |
| Sinéad Walsh | Mac Hale Rovers | | 4 | 6 | 18 |
| Lisa Cafferky | Kilmovee Shamrocks | | 3 | 5 | 14 |
| Sinéad Cafferky | Kilmovee Shamrocks | | 2 | 4 | 10 |
| Maria Reilly | Cill tSeadhna | | 2 | 1 | 7 |
| Ciara Whyte | Kilmoremoy | | 1 | 2 | 5 |
| Laura Moran | Westport | | 1 | 2 | 5 |
| Ava Keane | Hollymount | | 1 | 1 | 4 |
| Sarah Mulvihill | Knockmore | | 0 | 4 | 4 |
| Aoife Geraghty | Westport | | 0 | 2 | 2 |
| Ciara Needham | Louisburgh | | 0 | 1 | 1 |
| Tamara O'Connor | Cill Chomáin | | 0 | 1 | 1 |
| Tara Needham | Louisburgh | | 0 | 1 | 1 |

==== 2022 League Statistics ====
| 2022 | League Statistics |
|---|---|
| Games | 4 |
| Total Score | 92 points |
| Goals | 16 |
| Points | 44 |
| 1st Half (Total Score) | 52 points |
| Avg Pts (1st Half) | 13 points |
| 2nd Half (Total Score) | 40 points |
| Avg Pts (2nd Half) | 10 points |
| Wides | 15 |
| Avg Wides per Game | 3.75 wides |
| No. of Scoring Players | 13 |
| Top Scorer(s) | Shauna Howley (2–14) 20 pts |

=== Championship ===
On 15 May, Mayo began their 2022 Championship Campaign in the Connacht Senior Football Championship against Galway in Tuam Stadium. Galway got off to the better start registering 7 points to no score. Mayo eventually got off the mark after 29 minutes from Shauna Howley and followed it up with a further point from Ciara Needham, leading to a half-time score of 7 points to 2 in favour of Galway. In the second half, Mayo mounted somewhat of a comeback with a goal from Lisa Cafferky and points from Howley, Tara Needham, Tamara O'Connor and Sinéad Cafferky, but Galway responded with a goal and points of their own. In the end, though Mayo reduced the gap to 2 points with 9 minutes to go, they could not make up the deficit, losing by a final score line of 1–12 to 1–08. As a result, Mayo were placed in Group 1 of the upcoming senior championship campaign, the only 4 team group, with Tipperary, Cavan and Dublin.

The first game of the championship group stages took place on 11 June against Tipperary in McHale Park. In the first half Mayo had the wind advantage, but Tipperary managed to get the first point of the game after 13 seconds. Mayo came into the game after this however, scoring 3 early points, before a goal from Lisa Cafferky put Mayo up by 5 after 10 minutes. Mayo continued the good play over the next 10 minutes, with Lisa Cafferky, Shauna Howley, Ciara Needham and Tara Needham all scoring points to leave the score 1–7 to 0–2 after 20 minutes. Tipperary came back into the game, scoring 2 points in quick succession and getting a goal chance late on, but Mayo ended the half well with a series of points, making the half time score line 1–10 to 0–4. In the second half both sides had early chances but neither capitalised. The first score came in the 34th minute when Shauna Howley got a point. Both sides traded points but neither team really got going in the second half. Mayo scored 6 points, 2 points each from Howley and Sinead Walsh and 1 each from Cafferky and Tamara O'Connor, looking comfortable in the lead for most of the game. An injury time goal gave Tipperary some consolation, but by full-time Mayo still led by 10 points, a final score line of 1–16 to 1–06. The second group stage game was played on 19 June against Cavan in Pearse Park. Mayo were the better of the sides for the first 10 minutes & Shauna Howley scored 4 points in the first 15 minutes. Cavan came somewhat back into the game with a few points but 6 different scorers for Mayoled to a half-time scoreline of 0–11 to 0–05. In the second half both sides started evenly until Cavan got 2 goals, one after 39 minutes and the other after 43. With 14 minutes to go both sides were level, and an exchange of points kept the teams level with 5 minutes to go. A late point with one minute to go from Tara Needham gave Mayo a one-point win, a final score line of 0–16 to 2–09. The third and final game of the group stages took place on 25 June against Dublin at O'Moore Park. Mayo had a wind advantage in the first half. Both sides got early points, and after 15 minutes the score was 0–4 to 0–3 for Dublin. Dublin pulled slightly away in the following minutes but 2 points from Shauna Howley kept Mayo in the game, a half-time scoreline of 0–08 to 0–05. In the second half with the wind advantage Dublin pulled away scoring 2 goals and several points. Despite a late goal from Lisa Cafferky, Mayo failed to get going in the second half, a final scoreline of 2–14 to 1–07.

Mayo finished second in group A and played the winners of Group D, Cork, in the quarter-finals on 9 July in Cusack Park. Mayo had the better start with early points from Sinead Walsh, Shauna Howley and Kathryn Sullivan. In the 10th minute Mayo's Walsh got a goal, but Cork responded throughout the half with points to keep a close score line. At half-time the score line was 0–11 to 1–7. In the second half both sides traded points early on and the score line remained close until Lisa Cafferky capitalised on a Cork kick-out error and scored a goal. Despite Cork mounting a late comeback Mayo continued to trade points, running out eventual winners with a final score line of 2–13 to 0–17. In the semi-final Mayo faced Kerry on 16 July in Croke Park. Mayo got the first score of the game but Kerry responded with two goals in the first 10 minutes. Mayo reacted well scoring several points and reducing the gap to 3, but another goal in the 20th minute gave Kerry a 7-point lead at the end of the half. At half-time the score line was 3–06 to 0–08. In the second half both sides traded points before Kerry got another goal in the 43rd minute extending their lead to 10 points. Despite some good Mayo play the team was unable to make up the large deficit, a final score line of 4–10 to 0–13 to Kerry, knocking Mayo out of the competition. Two players, Danielle Caldwell and Shauna Howley, received All-Star awards for the 2022 season.

==== Starting XV's ====
2022 Mayo Senior Championship Panel

- Lucy Wallace (Burrishoole)
- Danielle Caldwell (Castlebar Mitchels)
- Kathryn Sullivan (Castlebar Mitchels)
- Fiona McHale (Carnacon)
- Tamara O'Connor (Cill Chomain)
- Éilis Ronayne (Davitts)
- Ciara Nyland (Davitts)
- Aisling Tarpey (Foxrock/Cabinteely)
- Laura Brennan (Hollymount)
- Jenna Mortimer (Hollymount)
- Ava Keane (Hollymount)
- Nicola Hession (Hollymount)
- Ciara Whyte (Kilmoremoy)
- Sinead Cafferky (Kilmovee Shamrocks)
- Lisa Cafferky (Kilmovee Shamrocks)
- Shauna Howley (Knockmore)
- Hannah Reape (Knockmore)
- Roisin Flynn (Knockmore)
- Nina McVann (Knockmore)
- Sarah Mulvihill (Knockmore)
- Tara Needham (Louisburgh)
- Ciara Needham (Louisburgh)
- Rachel Kearns (MacHale Rovers)
- Sinead Walsh (MacHale Rovers)
- Ava McDonnell (St. Brigids)
- Saoirse Lally (Westport)
- Sherin El Massry (Westport)
- Aoife Geraghty (Westport)
- Sorcha McCarney (Westport)

2022 Mayo Starting XV (Connacht Championship Final) vs Galway

Starting Team

- 1. Aisling Tarpey
- 2. Éilís Ronayne
- 3. Danielle Caldwell
- 4. Saoirse Lally
- 5. Ciara Needham
- 6. Fiona McHale
- 7. Kathryn Sullivan (c)
- 8. Sinéad Cafferky
- 9. Aoife Geraghty
- 10. Shauna Howley
- 11. Tamara O'Connor
- 12. Sarah Mulvihill
- 13. Sinead Walsh
- 14. Ciara Whyte
- 15. Lisa Cafferky

Substitutes

- Tara Needham for Sarah Mulvhill (35')
- Rachel Kearns for Ciara Whyte (42')
- Nina McVann for Tamara O'Connor (54')

2022 Mayo Starting XV (Championship Group Game 1) vs Tipperary

Starting Team

- 1. Aisling Tarpey
- 2. Éilís Ronayne
- 3. Danielle Caldwell
- 4. Saoirse Lally
- 5. Ciara Needham
- 6. Fiona McHale
- 7. Kathryn Sullivan (c)
- 8. Sinéad Cafferky
- 9. Sorcha McCarney
- 10. Aoife Geraghty
- 11. Sinéad Walsh
- 12. Sarah Mulvihill
- 13. Lisa Cafferky
- 14. Tara Needham
- 15. Shauna Howley

Substitutes

- Tamara O'Connor for Sarah Mulvihill (40')
- Jenna Mortimer for Fiona McHale (49')
- Lucy Wallace for Kathryn Sullivan (51')
- Ciara Whyte for Tara Needham (52')
- Nina Mc Vann for Saoirse Lally (57')

2022 Mayo Starting XV (Championship Group Game 2) vs Cavan

Starting Team

- 1. Aisling Tarpey
- 2. Éilís Ronayne
- 3. Danielle Caldwell
- 4. Saoirse Lally
- 5. Ciara Needham
- 6. Fiona McHale
- 7. Kathryn Sullivan (c)
- 8. Sinéad Cafferky
- 9. Tamara O'Connor
- 10. Aoife Geraghty
- 11. Sinéad Walsh
- 12. Sarah Mulvihill
- 13. Lisa Cafferky
- 14. Tara Needham
- 15. Shauna Howley

Substitutes

- Nina McVann for Éilís Ronayne (2')
- Róisín Flynn for Saoirse Lally (7')
- Sherin El Massry for Nina McVann (H.T.)
- Ciara Whyte for Tamara O'Connor (54')

2022 Mayo Starting XV (Championship Group Game 3) vs Dublin

Starting Team

- 1. Aisling Tarpey
- 2. Danielle Caldwell
- 3. Roisín Flynn
- 4. Sherin El Massry
- 5. Ciara Needham
- 6. Fiona McHale
- 7. Kathryn Sullivan (c)
- 8. Sinéad Cafferky
- 9. Aoife Geraghty
- 10. Tamara O'Connor
- 11. Sinéad Walsh
- 12. Sarah Mulvihill
- 13. Lisa Cafferky
- 14. Tara Needham
- 15. Shauna Howley

Substitutes

- Ciara Whyte for Tara Needham (28')
- Laura Brennan for Aisling Tarpey (H.T.)
- Lucy Wallace for Sherin El Massry (46')
- Erin Murray for Shauna Howley (51')
- Jenna Mortimer for Kathryn Sullivan (51')
- Hannah Reape for Tamara O’Connor (53')

2022 Mayo Starting XV (Championship QF) vs Cork

Starting Team

- 1. Aisling Tarpey
- 2. Éilis Ronayne
- 3. Roisín Flynn
- 4. Danielle Caldwell
- 5. Tamara O'Connor
- 6. Fiona McHale
- 7. Kathryn Sullivan (c)
- 8. Sinéad Cafferky
- 9. Aoife Geraghty
- 10. Shauna Howley
- 11. Sinéad Walsh
- 12. Sarah Mulvihill
- 13. Lisa Cafferky
- 14. Ciara Whyte
- 15. Tara Needham

Substitutes

- Ciara Needham for Sinéad Walsh (43')
- Erin Murray for Lisa Cafferky (52')
- Lucy Wallace for Kathryn Sullivan (57')
- Sherin El Massry for Éilis Ronayne (58')

2022 Mayo Starting XV (Championship SF) vs Kerry

Starting Team

- 1. Aisling Tarpey
- 2. Éilis Ronayne
- 3. Roisín Flynn
- 4. Danielle Caldwell
- 5. Tamara O'Connor
- 6. Fiona McHale
- 7. Kathryn Sullivan (c)
- 8. Sinéad Cafferky
- 9. Aoife Geraghty
- 10. Shauna Howley
- 11. Sinéad Walsh
- 12. Sarah Mulvihill
- 13. Lisa Cafferky
- 14. Ciara Whyte
- 15. Tara Needham

Substitutes

- Ciara Nyland for Sarah Mulvihill (30')
- Lucy Wallace for Kathryn Sullivan (47')
- Sorcha McCarney for Ciara Whyte (52')
- Jenna Mortimer for Fiona McHale (56')
- Sherin El Massry for Éilis Ronayne (56')

==== Group Results ====
Key to colours
| Advance to Division 1 Quarter-Finals |
| Relegation Playoff |

| Team | Pld | W | D | L | Group Points | Score Difference |
|---|---|---|---|---|---|---|
| Dublin | 3 | 3 | 0 | 0 | 9 | +37 |
| Mayo | 3 | 2 | 1 | 0 | 6 | +1 |
| Tipperary | 3 | 1 | 2 | 0 | 3 | -17 |
| Cavan | 3 | 0 | 3 | 0 | 0 | -21 |

==== Scoring List ====
| Player | Club | Club Colours | Goals | Points | Total Points |
|---|---|---|---|---|---|
| Shauna Howley | Knockmore | | 0 | 25 | 25 |
| Lisa Cafferky | Kilmovee Shamrocks | | 4 | 9 | 21 |
| Sinéad Walsh | Mac Hale Rovers | | 1 | 8 | 11 |
| Tara Needham | Louisburgh | | 0 | 9 | 9 |
| Sinéad Cafferky | Kilmovee Shamrocks | | 0 | 6 | 6 |
| Tamara O'Connor | Cill Chomáin | | 0 | 5 | 5 |
| Sarah Mulvihill | Knockmore | | 0 | 4 | 4 |
| Ciara Needham | Louisburgh | | 0 | 3 | 3 |
| Aoife Geraghty | Westport | | 0 | 2 | 2 |
| Ciara Whyte | Kilmoremoy | | 0 | 1 | 1 |
| Kathryn Sullivan | Castlebar Mitchels | | 0 | 1 | 1 |

==== 2022 Championship Statistics ====
| 2022 | Championship Statistics |
|---|---|
| Games | 6 |
| Total Score | 88 points |
| Total Score Conceded | 98 points (10–68) |
| Goals | 5 |
| Points | 73 |
| 1st Half (Total Score) | 49 points |
| Avg Pts (1st Half) | 8 points |
| 2nd Half (Total Score) | 39 points |
| Avg Pts (2nd Half) | 6.5 points |
| No. of Scoring Players | 11 |
| Top Scorer | Shauna Howley (0–25) 25 pts |

== 2023 ==
=== Management Team ===
| Position | Name |
|---|---|
| Manager | Michael Moyles |
| Mentor | Aiden McLoughlin |
| Physio | Leona Ryder |
| Defensive Coach | Ger Cafferkey |
| Strength & Conditioning | Martin Connor |
| Liaison Officer | Dr. Lisa Cunningham |
| FLO | Stella O'Neill |
| Goalkeeping Coach | Michael Schlingerman |

=== League ===
For the 2023 Ladies' National Football League season Division 1A and 1B were merged to create a single Division 1 consisting of 8 teams and 7 rounds. The teams in Division 1 were Mayo, Cork, Donegal, Dublin, Galway, Kerry, Meath and Waterford, with the top two placed teams playing in the Division 1 final.

Mayo began their campaign with a round 1 clash against Cork on 22 January at the Connacht Centre of Excellence in Bekan. Cork had the better start to the game and only for a great save by goalkeeper Laura Brennan Mayo would've been down a goal in the first two minutes. Despite this Cork dominated the early part of the game and after 15 minutes the score was Cork 0–4 to Mayo's no score. Mayo registered their first score in the 19th minute with a point from Tara Needham, but a goal and several extra points from Cork led to a half-time score line of 1–06 to 0–2. In the second half Cork continued where they had left off scoring two early points, but Mayo responded with a purple patch and points from Shauna Howley and Lisa Cafferky to leave them trailing by 5 points after 45 mins. Mayo continued to reduce the deficit and with 3 minutes to go they trailed by just two points. Despite the second half resurgence from Mayo Cork managed to get a goal in the final minutes of the game, leading to a round 1 defeat for Mayo and a final score-line of 2–11 to 0–12.

In round 2 Mayo faced Kerry on 28 January at the Connacht Centre of Excellence in Bekan. Kerry had the better start and an early save from Mayo's Laura Brennan prevented an early goal chance in the first 2 minutes. Mayo got their first score in the 5th minute with a point from Maria Cannon, but Kerry were the better side in the first 15 minutes score 5 points to Mayo's 0–2. For the rest of the half neither team could establish their authority on the game and both sides traded points, a half-time score line of 0–5 to 0–4 in favour of Kerry. In the second half the game ebbed back and forth for the first 5 minutes before Kerry got a goal to leave Mayo's deficit at 4 points. This was followed in the 38th minute by another Kerry goal. Over the next few minutes Mayo managed a comeback with points from Sinead Walsh, Shauna Howley and Cannon, but another goal from Kerry put Mayo down by 6 points in the 45th minute. This however was Kerry's last score of the game and for the last 15 minutes Mayo chipped away at their lead. Several scores left Mayo down by just 1 point with 4 minutes to go, but Kerry managed to hang on, a final score line of 3–05 to 0–13.

In round 3 Mayo faced Waterford on 5 February in Dungarvan. Despite an energetic start from Mayo Waterford had the better opening to the game, scoring two early points. For the next few minutes both sides traded points, and after 20 minutes the score line was 0–4 to 0–2 in favour of Waterford. Over the last 10 minutes Waterford continued to have the better of the possession, and despite two late Mayo points a Waterford goal just before the break led to a halftime score line of 1–6 to 0–4. In the second half Mayo's Lisa Cafferky scored 2 early points, but Waterford responded with a second goal leaving Mayo behind by six points at the 40 minute mark. For the next 10 minutes both sides again traded points, and with 10 minutes to go Mayo were down by 4 points. Despite a late comeback where Mayo reduced the deficit to 1 point, a late point from the opponents led to a 2-point loss, a final score line of 2–09 to 0–13.

In round 4 Mayo faced Meath on 18 February in Páirc Tailteann, Navan. Mayo started the game well with 2 early points, but Meath responded with 3 quick points leaving the score 0–3 to 0–2 after 10 minutes. Meath continued to pile on the pressure, scoring another 3 points in the following 10 minutes, which left Mayo behind by 4 points after 20 minutes. For the rest of the half both Meath and Mayo traded points, a half-time score of 0–7 to 0–3. In the second half with the breeze on their back Mayo had the better of the possession and got 2 goals in the 40th and 42nd minutes to put them up by 3 points. Mayo continued to pile on the pressure, limiting Meath to two points in the second half, and despite a late surge from Meath they managed to weather the storm and get the win, a final score line of 2–06 to 0–09.

In round 5 Mayo faced Dublin on 25 February in DCU St. Clare's. Both sides started well trading several points until the 14th minute when Sinead Walsh scored a goal. After 15 minutes the score was 1–02 to 0–3. For the rest of the half Mayo were the better side, slotting over several points, to make the half time score 1–04 to 0–4. In the second half both sides began trading points before Sinead Walsh got her second goal in the 33rd minute. After this both sides traded points, and with 15 minutes to go Mayo led by 5 points. In the 52nd minute Dublin responded with a goal and several points, leaving the game level with 5 minutes to go. With 3 minutes to go Dublin got a penalty which they missed, but in the final minute Dublin scored a goal leaving them 4 ahead, a final score line of 2–11 to 2–07.

In round 6 Mayo faced Galway on 19 March in MacHale Park. Poor weather conditions led to no score for the first 10 minutes of the game. The first score came in the 13th minute when Mayo's Tara Needham slotted away a goal. Galway responded with three frees to leave the teams level with 17 minutes gone. For the rest of the half both sides had good periods of play, and at half time Galway led by 1 point, 1–03 to 0–7. In the second half Galway started better with 2 early points but a goal from Rachel Kearns left the sides level on the 36th minute. For the next few minutes both sides had good periods of play, and with 10 minutes remaining Galway led by 1 point. In the last 10 minutes despite some good scores from Mayo they couldn't take the lead, a final score line of 2–06 to 0–13.

In round 7 Mayo will faced Donegal in a relegation decider on 26 March in Letterkenny. Mayo got the better start with a goal by Rachel Kearns in the first 2 minutes. Mayo continued the scoring, and after 20 minutes the score was 2–03 to 0–1. A further 2 goals left Mayo far out in the lead at the half, a half-time score line of 4–05 to 0–01. The second half was a low scoring affair, and despite 3 Donegal goals Mayo maintained their large lead, a final score line of 5–09 to 3–02, leaving Mayo 6th in Division 1 and safe from relegation.

==== Starting XV's ====
2023 Mayo Senior NFL Panel

- Saoirse Delaney (Aghamore)
- Erin Murray (Ballyhaunis)
- Clodagh McManamon (Burrishoole)
- Maria Cannon (Burrishoole)
- Lucy Wallace (Burrishoole)
- Danielle Caldwell (Castlebar Mitchels)
- Kathryn Sullivan (Castlebar Mitchels)
- Fiona McHale (Carnacon)
- Ella Brennan (Charlestown)
- Deirdre Doherty (Charlestown)
- Tamara O'Connor (Cill Chomain)
- Éilis Ronayne (Davitts)
- Laura Brennan (Hollymount)
- Sarah Tierney (Hollymount)
- Sinead Cafferky (Kilmovee Shamrocks)
- Lisa Cafferky (Kilmovee Shamrocks)
- Maria Reilly (Kiltane)
- Shauna Howley (Knockmore)
- Hannah Reape (Knockmore)
- Emily Reape (Knockmore)
- Roisin Flynn (Knockmore)
- Ciara Durkan (Knockmore)
- Tara Needham (Louisburgh)
- Ciara Needham (Louisburgh)
- Sinead Walsh (MacHale Rovers)
- Rachel Kearns (MacHale Rovers)
- Lisa Reid (Moy Davitts)
- Saoirse Lally (Westport)
- Sorcha McCarney (Westport)
- Sherin El Massy (Westport)

2023 Mayo Starting XV (Rd. 1 League Campaign) vs Cork

Starting Team

- 1. Laura Brennan
- 2. Éilís Ronayne
- 3. Roisin Flynn
- 4. Danielle Caldwell
- 5. Ciara Needham
- 6. Fiona McHale
- 7. Kathryn Sullivan (c)
- 8. Clodagh McManamon
- 9. Hannah Reape
- 10. Emily Reape
- 11. Sinead Cafferky
- 12. Shauna Howley
- 13. Maria Cannon
- 14. Tara Needham
- 15. Rachel Kearns

Substitutes

- Lisa Cafferky for Emily Reape (HT)
- Sarah Tierney for Hannah Reape (53')
- Lucy Wallace for Ciara Needham (53')
- Maria Reilly for Tara Needham (55')

2023 Mayo Starting XV (Rd. 2 League Campaign) vs Kerry

Starting Team

- 1. Laura Brennan
- 2. Éilís Ronayne
- 3. Roisin Flynn
- 4. Danielle Caldwell (c)
- 5. Lucy Wallace
- 6. Sarah Tierney
- 7. Kathryn Sullivan
- 8. Clodagh McManamon
- 9. Sinead Cafferky
- 10. Hannah Reape
- 11. Shauna Howley
- 12. Tara Needham
- 13. Lisa Cafferky
- 14. Rachel Kearns
- 15. Maria Cannon

Substitutes

- Sinead Walsh for Hannah Reape (40')
- Ciara Needham for Kathryn Sullivan (50')
- Erin Murray for Tara Needham (56')
- Fiona McHale for Rachel Kearns (56').

2023 Mayo Starting XV (Rd. 3 League Campaign) vs Waterford

Starting Team

- 1. Laura Brennan
- 2. Éilís Ronayne
- 3. Roisin Flynn
- 4. Danielle Caldwell
- 5. Ciara Needham
- 6. Sarah Tierney
- 7. Kathryn Sullivan (c)
- 8. Clodagh McManamon
- 9. Sinead Cafferky
- 10. Fiona McHale
- 11. Shauna Howley
- 12. Maria Cannon
- 13. Lisa Cafferky
- 14. Rachel Kearns
- 15. Sinead Walsh

Substitutes

- Lucy Wallace for Ciara Needham (HT)
- Saoirse Delaney for Rachel Kearns (HT)
- Hannah Reape for Fiona Mc Hale (44')
- Ella Brennan for Kathryn Sullivan (49')
- Tara Needham for Sinead Walsh (49')
- Erin Murray for Maria Cannon (54')
- Ciara Durkan for Sarah Tierney (57')

2023 Mayo Starting XV (Rd. 4 League Campaign) vs Meath

Starting Team

- 1. Laura Brennan
- 2. Éilís Ronayne
- 3. Ciara Needham
- 4. Danielle Caldwell
- 5. Lucy Wallace
- 6. Fiona McHale
- 7. Sinead Walsh
- 8. Clodagh McManamon
- 9. Sinead Cafferky
- 10. Hannah Reape
- 11. Shauna Howley (c)
- 12. Maria Cannon
- 13. Lisa Cafferky
- 14. Maria Reilly
- 15. Tara Needham

Substitutes

- Kathryn Sullivan for Lucy Wallace (HT)
- Rachel Kearns for Sinead Cafferky (35')
- Sarah Mulvihill for Maria Cannon (44')
- Ella Brennan for Hannah Reape (49')
- Tamara O'Connor for Maria Reilly (52')

2023 Mayo Starting XV (Rd. 5 League Campaign) vs Dublin

Starting Team

- 1. Laura Brennan
- 2. Éilís Ronayne
- 3. Roisin Flynn
- 4. Danielle Caldwell
- 5. Ciara Needham
- 6. Fiona McHale
- 7. Kathryn Sullivan (c)
- 8. Clodagh McManamon
- 9. Sinead Cafferky
- 10. Sinead Walsh
- 11. Shauna Howley
- 12. Hannah Reape
- 13. Lisa Cafferky
- 14. Rachel Kearns
- 15. Tara Needham

Substitutes

- Aoife Geraghty for Hannah Reape (HT)
- Sarah Mulvihill for Lisa Cafferky (47')
- Sarah Tierney for Danielle Caldwell (50')
- Maria Cannon for Rachel Kearns (56')
- Tamara O'Connor for Shauna Howley (59')

2023 Mayo Starting XV (Rd. 6 League Campaign) vs Galway

Starting Team

- 1. Laura Brennan
- 2. Éilís Ronayne
- 3. Saoirse Lally
- 4. Danielle Caldwell
- 5. Ciara Needham
- 6. Fiona McHale
- 7. Kathryn Sullivan (c)
- 8. Aoife Geraghty
- 9. Sinead Cafferky
- 10. Sinead Walsh
- 11. Shauna Howley
- 12. Tamara O'Connor
- 13. Lisa Cafferky
- 14. Rachel Kearns
- 15. Tara Needham

Substitutes

- Deirdre Doherty for Sinead Walsh (21')
- Maria Cannon for Fiona McHale (47')
- Maria Reilly for Shauna Howley (54')
- Sarah Mulvihill for Lisa Cafferky (54')
- Hannah Reape for Tamara O’Connor (60')

2023 Mayo Starting XV (Rd. 7 League Campaign) vs Donegal

Starting Team

- 1. Laura Brennan
- 2. Eilis Ronayne
- 3. Danielle Caldwell
- 4. Saoirse Lally
- 5. Tamara O’Connor
- 6. Ciara Needham
- 7. Kathryn Sullivan
- 8. Aoife Geraghty
- 9. Sinead Cafferky
- 10. Deirdre Doherty
- 11. Shauna Howley
- 12. Fiona McHale
- 13. Lisa Cafferky
- 14. Rachel Kearns
- 15. Maria Reilly

Substitutes

- Sinead Walsh for Rachel Kearns (6 ')
- Sarah Mulvihill for Maria Reilly (13')
- Roisin Flynn for Ciara Needham (14'),
- Sarah Tierney for Danielle Caldwell (28')
- Ella Brennan for Kathryn Sullivan (33'),
- Saoirse Delaney for Deirdre Doherty (HT),
- Maria Cannon for Tamara O'Connor (40)'
- Hannah Reape for Fiona McHale (40')
- Lucy Wallace for Shauna Howley (40')
- Ciara Durcan for Sarah Tierney (43')
- Jenna Mortimer for Eilis Ronayne (43')
- Lisa Reid for Laura Brennan (46')
- Emily Reape for Saoirse Lally (52')
- Erin Murray for Lisa Cafferky (52')
- Roisin Durcan for Sinead Cafferky (55')
- Maria Reilly for Sinead Walsh (58')
- Danielle Caldwell for Ella Brennan (68')

==== Group Results ====
Key to colours
| Advance to Division 1 Finals |
| Relegation |

| Team | Pld | W | D | L | Group Points | Score Difference |
|---|---|---|---|---|---|---|
| Kerry | 7 | 6 | 1 | 0 | 18 | +22 |
| Galway | 7 | 5 | 1 | 1 | 16 | +16 |
| Dublin | 7 | 5 | 2 | 0 | 15 | +20 |
| Cork | 7 | 4 | 2 | 1 | 13 | 38 |
| Waterford | 7 | 3 | 3 | 1 | 10 | -11 |
| Mayo | 7 | 2 | 5 | 0 | 6 | +3 |
| Meath | 7 | 2 | 5 | 0 | 4 | -20 |
| Donegal | 7 | 0 | 7 | 0 | 0 | -71 |

==== Scoring List ====
| Player | Club | Club Colours | Goals | Points | Total Points |
|---|---|---|---|---|---|
| Shauna Howley | Knockmore | | 0 | 24 | 24 |
| Sinéad Walsh | Mac Hale Rovers | | 4 | 5 | 17 |
| Lisa Cafferky | Kilmovee Shamrocks | | 1 | 10 | 13 |
| Maria Cannon | Burrishoole | | 1 | 9 | 12 |
| Rachel Kearns | MacHale Rovers | | 2 | 5 | 11 |
| Tara Needham | Louisburgh | | 1 | 5 | 8 |
| Sinéad Cafferky | Kilmovee Shamrocks | | 1 | 3 | 6 |
| Deirdre Doherty | Charlestown Sarsfields | | 1 | 2 | 5 |
| Ella Brennan | Charlestown Sarsfields | | 0 | 1 | 1 |
| Erin Murray | Ballyhaunis | | 0 | 1 | 1 |

==== 2023 League Statistics ====
| 2023 | League Statistics |
|---|---|
| Games | 7 |
| Total Score | 99 points |
| Total Score Conceded | 96 points (12–60) |
| Goals | 11 |
| Points | 66 |
| 1st Half (Total Score) | 43 points |
| Avg Pts (1st Half) | 6 points |
| 2nd Half (Total Score) | 56 points |
| Avg Pts (2nd Half) | 8 points |
| No. of Scoring Players | 10 |
| Top Scorer | Shauna Howley (0–24) 24 pts |

=== Championship ===
The 2023 All-Ireland Senior Ladies Football Championship began with the Connacht final, where Mayo faced Galway on 6 May in MacHale Park. Mayo started the game well, scoring 1–3 in the first 6 minutes without reply. As the half progressed Galway began to score and went on a streak of 1–4 without reply. Both sides then traded points, and at half time the score line was 1–8 to 1–7 in favour of Galway. In the second half Mayo had the better of the chances, with goals from Rachel Kearns and Sinead Walsh securing the win, a final score line of 3–13 to 2–09 and the first time Mayo had won the Connacht championship since 2016. As a result of the victory Mayo were put into Group A of the All-Ireland Championship group stages alongside Armagh and Laois.

Mayo first faced Armagh on 25 June in the Athletic Grounds. Mayo started the game well, with Sinead Cafferky scoring 1–1 in the first 10 minutes. From there both teams traded points, a half time score line of 1–06 to 0–04. In the second half Armagh had the better start scoring 1–3 without reply, and with 40 minutes gone the score was level at 1–07 to 1–07. Both sides traded points, and with 5 minutes to go the score line was 1–09 to 1–09. Mayo looked to pull ahead in the dying minutes of the game with 2 points from Deirdre Doherty, but a late penalty from Armagh left Mayo behind at the end of the game, a final score line of 1–11 to 2–10.

In round 2 Mayo faced Laois on 1 July in MacHale Park. Mayo began the game with 7 points from 5 different scorers before Laois scored their first in the 13th minute. Mayo continued the scoring prowess with a goal from Sinead Walsh and a further 2 points to leave the half time score line at 1–09 to 0–04. In the second half Mayo continued the scoring prowess, with a goal from Sinead Cafferky and 6 further points led to a comfortable victory, a final score line of 2–15 to 0–08. As a result of the group stage, Mayo finished second securing a quarter final away fixture against Galway.

In the quarter final of the 2023 championship Mayo faced Galway on 15 July in Pearse Stadium. Mayo started the game well, registering the first 2 points of the match, but a goal by Galway in the 6th minute led to a cagey first half where neither side looked like pulling away. Points from Deirdre Doherty, Sinead Cafferky, Ciara Needham, and Tara Needham led to a half time score line of 0–06 to 1–02. In the second half both sides again traded points, and with 1 minute to go the score was 1–06 to 0–09. With both sides looking for a winner the ball was intercepted on the halfway line by Mayo's Ciara Needham who passed to Shauna Howley, and with 20 seconds to go Howley scored the winning point and booked Mayo's place in the semi-final, a final score line of 0–10 to 1–06.

In the Championship semi-final Mayo faced Kerry on 29 July in Semple Stadium. Both sides exchanged points in the first 10 minutes, but from the 13th to the 21st minute Kerry scored 1–07 without reply. Mayo managed a few more points, but at half time the score line was 1–10 to 0–4. In the second half Mayo mounted a comeback with a goal from Deirdre Doherty and points from Rachel Kearns, Sinead Walsh, Lisa Cafferky, Shauna Howley, Aoife Geraghty and Ciara Needham, but they were unable to reduce the deficit enough, a final score line of 1–16 to 1–11, knocking Mayo out of the competition.

==== Starting XV's ====
2023 Mayo Starting XV (2023 Connacht Championship) vs Galway

Starting Team

- 1. Laura Brennan
- 2. Saoirse Lally
- 3. Roisin Flynn
- 4. Éilis Ronayne
- 5. Kathryn Sullivan (c)
- 6. Fiona McHale
- 7. Tamara O'Connor
- 8. Aoife Geraghty
- 9. Rachel Kearns
- 10. Sarah Mulvihill
- 11. Danielle Caldwell
- 12. Sinead Cafferky
- 13. Tara Needham
- 14. Deirdre Doherty
- 15. Lisa Cafferky

Substitutes

- Sinead Walsh for Tara Needham (36')
- Shauna Howley for Roisin Flynn (45')
- Maria Cannon for Sarah Mulvihill (48')
- Ciara Needham for Fiona McHale (57')
- Lucy Wallace for Tamara O'Connor (57')

2023 Mayo Starting XV (Rd. 1 Championship Group) vs Armagh

Starting Team

- 1. Laura Brennan
- 2. Éilis Ronayne
- 3. Clodagh McManamon
- 4. Danielle Caldwell
- 5. Ciara Needham
- 6. Fiona McHale
- 7. Kathryn Sullivan (c)
- 8. Aoife Geraghty
- 9. Sinead Cafferky
- 10. Shauna Howley
- 11. Tamara O’Connor
- 12. Sarah Mulvihill
- 13. Lisa Cafferky
- 14. Deirdre Doherty
- 15. Sinead Walsh

Substitutes

- Lucy Wallace for Tamara O’Connor (29')
- Maria Cannon for Shauna Howley (40')
- Maria Reily for Sarah Mulvihill (48')
- Saoirse Lally for Kathryn Sullivan (58')
- Roisin Flynn for Ciara Needham (58')

2023 Mayo Starting XV (Rd. 2 Championship Group) vs Laois

Starting Team

- 1. Laura Brennan
- 2. Éilis Ronayne
- 3. Clodagh McManamon
- 4. Danielle Caldwell
- 5. Saoirse Lally
- 6. Ciara Needham
- 7. Kathryn Sullivan (c)
- 8. Aoife Geraghty
- 9. Fiona McHale
- 10. Maria Cannon
- 11. Sinead Cafferky
- 12. Saoirse Delaney
- 13. Shauna Howley
- 14. Deirdre Doherty
- 15. Sinead Walsh

Substitutes

- Maria Reilly for Deirdre Doherty (40')
- Sarah Tierney for Fiona McHale (44')
- Roisin Durkan for Kathryn Sullivan (49')
- Erin Murray for Ciara Needham (50')

2023 Mayo Starting XV (2023 QF Championship) vs Galway

Starting Team

- 1. Laura Brennan
- 2. Saoirse Lally
- 3. Clodagh McManamon
- 4. Danielle Caldwell
- 5. Kathryn Sullivan (c)
- 6. Ciara Needham
- 7. Éilis Ronayne
- 8. Aoife Geraghty
- 9. Sinead Walsh
- 10. Sarah Mulvihill
- 11. Fiona McHale
- 12. Sinead Cafferky
- 13. Deirdre Doherty
- 14. Rachel Kearns
- 15. Tara Needham

Subs:

- Shauna Howley for Deirdre Doherty (HT')
- Maria Cannon for Sarah Mulvihill (43')
- Lucy Wallace for Kathryn Sullivan (51')
- Lisa Cafferky for Fiona McHale (55')
- Tamara O’Connor for Aoife Geraghty (60')

2023 Mayo Starting XV (2023 SF Championship) vs Kerry

Starting Team

- 1. Laura Brennan
- 2. Saoirse Lally
- 3. Clodagh McManamon
- 4. Danielle Caldwell
- 5. Éilis Ronayne
- 6. Ciara Needham
- 7. Kathryn Sullivan (c)
- 8. Aoife Geraghty
- 9. Tamara O'Connor
- 10. Sinead Cafferky
- 11. Rachel Kearns
- 12. Sarah Mulvihill
- 13. Tara Needham
- 14. Shauna Howley
- 15. Lisa Cafferky

Subs:

- Sinead Walsh for Sarah Mulvihill (26')
- Lucy Wallace for Tamara O'Connor (44')
- Deirdre Doherty for Rachel Kearns (51')
- Maria Cannon for Tara Needham (55')
- Fiona McHale for Shauna Howley (60')

==== Group Results ====
Key to colours
| Advance to Division 1 Quarter-Finals |
| Did Not Qualify |

| Team | Pld | W | D | L | Group Points | Score Difference |
|---|---|---|---|---|---|---|
| Armagh | 2 | 2 | 0 | 0 | 6 | +9 |
| Mayo | 2 | 1 | 0 | 1 | 3 | +11 |
| Laois | 2 | 0 | 0 | 2 | 0 | -20 |

==== Scoring List ====
| Player | Club | Club Colours | Goals | Points | Total Points |
|---|---|---|---|---|---|
| Sinéad Cafferky | Kilmovee Shamrocks | | 2 | 11 | 17 |
| Deirdre Doherty | Charlestown Sarsfields | | 1 | 13 | 16 |
| Sinéad Walsh | Mac Hale Rovers | | 2 | 7 | 13 |
| Shauna Howley | Knockmore | | 0 | 12 | 12 |
| Rachel Kearns | MacHale Rovers | | 1 | 3 | 6 |
| Lisa Cafferky | Kilmovee Shamrocks | | 0 | 5 | 5 |
| Ciara Needham | Louisburgh | | 0 | 4 | 4 |
| Tamara O'Connor | Cill Chomáin | | 1 | 0 | 3 |
| Tara Needham | Louisburgh | | 0 | 2 | 2 |
| Aoife Geraghty | Westport | | 0 | 1 | 1 |
| Éilis Ronayne | Davitts | | 0 | 1 | 1 |
| Maria Cannon | Burrishoole | | 0 | 1 | 1 |

==== 2023 Championship Statistics ====
| 2023 | Championship Statistics |
|---|---|
| Games | 5 |
| Total Score | 81 points |
| Total Score Conceded | 67 points (6–49) |
| Goals | 7 |
| Points | 60 |
| 1st Half (Total Score) | 41 points |
| Avg Pts (1st Half) | 8 points |
| 2nd Half (Total Score) | 40 points |
| Avg Pts (2nd Half) | 8 points |
| No. of Scoring Players | 12 |
| Top Scorer | Sinéad Cafferky (2–11) 17 pts |

=== 2023 Post Season ===
On 10 August it was announced that Michael Moyles had stepped down as the manager of the Mayo ladies team after three years in charge. On 7 November former men's Mayo footballer Liam McHale was hired as the new manager of the ladies football team on a three-year contract. On 18 November Danielle Caldwell was the only Mayo player to win an All-Star award for the 2023 season.

== 2024 ==
=== Management Team ===
| Position | Name |
|---|---|
| Manager | Liam McHale |
| Maor Foirne | Kenneth Mortimer |
| Mentor | Dermot Flanagan |
| Mentor | Padraig Hennigan |
| Mentor | Michael Schlingerman |
| Mentor | Peter Scully |
| Mentor | Clive Reilly |
| Mentor | Lisa Cunningham |
| FLO | Stella O'Neill |
| Physio | Fergus McCormack |

=== League ===
For the 2024 Ladies' National Football League season, two teams would be relegated from Division 1, 2, and 3, rather than the one team in previous years. Mayo began their Division 1 campaign in round 1 by facing Meath at the NUI Galway Connacht GAA Air Dome in Bekan on 21 January at 2:30 pm. For the first few minutes of the game both sides traded points, and a goal by Maria Cannon was matched by a Meath goal. After Meath's goal they followed that up with several points, and despite several scores from Maria Cannon and Alana Fitzpatrick Meath scored another goal leading to a half-time score of 1–08 to 2–10. In the second half Mayo got 2 early points but struggled to get scores as the game progressed. Meath continued to score and Mayo never really looked like they'd reduce the deficit, a final score line of 2–18 to 1–15.

In round 2 Mayo faced Galway on 27 January at 3:15 pm in Ballinasloe. In the first 5 minutes both sides traded free kicks, with Maria Cannon scoring early. A yellow card for Aoife Geraghty allowed Galway to get an upper hand for a time, and with 20 minutes gone they led by 0–4 to 0–2. Mayo weathered the storm however, and an excellent pass by Tara Needham led to Lisa Cafferky scoring a goal in the 22nd minute. This was followed up by a point from Sinead Walsh, leading to a half time score line of 1–3 to 0–5. The second half began cagey, with both sides missing opportunities early. Galway got the first score of the second half in the 36th minute, followed by a Cafferky point in the 42nd minute. In the 46th minute Mayo managed to break Galway's lines, and another Needham-Cafferky play led to Mayo's and Cafferky's second goal. From here and despite some great Mayo defending by captain Saoirse Lally and others, Galway slowly edged their way back into the game scoring 3 unanswered points in the last 10 minutes. With the last kick of the game and Mayo up by one Galway got a free kick in a dangerous position, but the shot went to the left and wide, leading to the final whistle and a 2–05 to 0–10 win for Mayo, their first win of the league campaign.

In round 3 Mayo faced Dublin on 4 February at 2 pm in Ballina. In the first half Mayo had the advantage of a strong wind on their backs and capitalised early, with Lisa Cafferky getting an early goal and point, and Sinead Walsh adding another point. After 5 minutes the score was 1-2 to 0-0. Mayo's good play continued, and in the 9th minute Tara Needham was fouled inside the square, leading to a converted penalty by Cafferky. Dublin got their first point in the 12th minute from a free, but this was followed by 2 more points from Cafferky. For the rest of the half both sides traded points, and at half time Mayo were ahead by 2-7 to 0-4. In the second half Mayo struggled playing against the wind. By the 45th minute Dublin, with the wind advantage, scored 1-6 to leave the sides level. Dublin continued to pile on the pressure and went 2 points ahead with 5 minutes to go. Dublin followed this up with several points and a late goal. Despite lots of hard work by many of the Mayo players, they scored their first and only point of the half from a free in the 59th minute, leading to a 7 point loss and a final score line of 2-15 to 2-08.

In round 4 Mayo faced Kerry on 27 February at 2.30pm in Fitzgerald Stadium. Mayo started the game poorly, conceding 3 early points, but managed to mount a comeback in the form of 2 points each from Maria Cannon and Sinead Walsh. The rest of the half was a low scoring affair, leading to a half time score line of 0-4 to 0-4. In the second half Kerry again went 3 points ahead and looked the better team for much of the game, but Mayo again managed a comeback with points from Cannon and 2 late scores from Sinead Walsh. The second half played out in much the same way as the first, which led to a draw and a final score line of 0-8 to 0-8.

In round 5 Mayo faced Cork on 2 March at 5.30pm at Páirc Uí Chaoimh's 4G Astro Training Pitch. The game started slowly with both sides having periods of good play. After 15 minutes both sides were level at 2 points each. This continued for the rest of the half with neither side able to get ahead, a half time score line of 0-5 to 0-5. In the second half Mayo started the game poorly missing several point opportunities before Sinead Cafferky got the first of the half. In the 40th minute Mayo got a penalty which was missed by Lisa Cafferky. Despite this, with 15 minutes to go Mayo were up by 2 points. Mayo maintained this lead for the remainder of the game, a final score line of 0-9 to 0-7.

In round 6 Mayo faced Armagh on 17 March at 1pm in Ballina. Both sides started the game with a wide in the first 2 minutes. Mayo got their first score via a Maria Cannon free kick in the 8th minute. After 15 minutes Mayo was down by a point, and despite a saved goal chance for Kathryn Sullivan, Armagh scored a goal in the 18th minute to make the score line 1-2 to 0-1.Armagh dominated the rest of the first half scoring another goal and several points. Mayo scored their 2nd point in the 29th minute, a half time score line of 2-5 to 0-2.In the second half Mayo started better scoring 3 points in quick succession, followed by a Sinead Walsh goal in the 42nd minute. Mayo continued the good play, and with 10 minutes to go Mayo were down by 4 points. A Saoirse Delaney goal in the 51st minute and a Cannon point left both sides level with 8 minutes to go. Armagh responded with a point leaving them ahead by 1 point with 3 minutes to go, but Mato responded with a levelling point with 2 minutes to go. In the last minute Armagh got a free kick which they converted, leading to a Mayo one point loss and a final score line of 2-9 to 2-8.

In round 7 Mayo faced Waterford on 24 of March at 2pm in Ballina. Mayo started the game poorly, conceding a goal in the first 45 seconds, but responded straight away with a goal of their own in the first minute by Fionnuala McLaughlin. Aoife Geraghty got the next score of the game, leading to a score line of 1-1 to 1-0 after 10 minutes. The next few minutes were cagey before Ciara Needham got 2 points in quick succession. Waterford eventually got their next score in the 27th minute with a 2nd goal and another point, but Geraghty and Maria Cannon responded with points of their own and McLoughlin got a 2nd goal, leaving the score line at half time 2-5 to 2-2. In the second half Mayo started well with a Lisa Cafferky point in the 31st minute. For the next 15 minutes both sides exchanged points, with Kathryn Sullivan and Aoife Staunton scoring, and with 5 minutes to go Mayo were ahead by 3 points. In the last five minutes both sides had chances to win the game for their sides, but Mayo maintained their 3 point lead to the end, a final score line of 2-9 to 2-6, securing their Division 1 status for next year.

==== Starting XV's ====
2024 Mayo Senior NFL Panel

- Niamh Mooney (Aghamore)
- Saoirse Delaney (Aghamore)
- Maria Cannon (Burrishoole)
- Lucy Wallace (Burrishoole)
- Danielle Caldwell (Castlebar Mitchels)
- Kathryn Sullivan (Castlebar Mitchels)
- Fiona McHale (Carnacon)
- Chelsea Doherty (Charlestown)
- Alana Fitzpatrick (Claremorris)
- Jenna Mortimer (Hollymount)
- Laura Brennan (Hollymount)
- Milly Sheridan (Kilmoremoy)
- Lisa Cafferky (Kilmovee Shamrocks)
- Ciara Durkan (Knockmore)
- Hannah Reape (Knockmore)
- Emily Reape (Knockmore)
- Emma Needham (Louisburgh)
- Ciara Needham (Louisburgh)
- Tara Needham (Louisburgh)
- Annie Gough (Mac Hale Rovers)
- Sinead Walsh (MacHale Rovers)
- Lisa Reid (Moy Davitts)
- Rebecca Kiernan (Parke Keelogues Crimlin)
- Caitlin Henry (Swinford Killasser)
- Aoife Geraghty (Westport)
- Aoife Staunton (Westport)
- Fionnuala McLaughlin (Westport)
- Nicola O'Malley (Westport)
- Saoirse Lally (Westport)
- Sorcha McCarney (Westport)

2024 Mayo Starting XV (Rd. 1 League Campaign) vs Meath

Starting Team

- 1. Lisa Reid
- 2. Lucy Wallace
- 3. Saoirse Lally (c)
- 4. Nicola O'Malley
- 5. Kathryn Sullivan
- 6. Danielle Caldwell
- 7. Jenna Mortimer
- 8. Aoife Geraghty
- 9. Hannah Reape
- 10. Fionnuala McLaughlin
- 11. Lisa Cafferky
- 12. Maria Cannon
- 13. Tara Needham
- 14. Fiona McHale
- 15. Alana Fitzpatrick

Substitutes

- Annie Gough for Hannah Reape (38')
- Emily Reape for Kathryn Sullivan (42')
- Emma Needham for Fiona McHale (46')
- Sinead Walsh for Tara Needham (49')
- Caitlin Henry for Lisa Cafferky (52')

2024 Mayo Starting XV (Rd. 2 League Campaign) vs Galway

Starting Team

- 1. Lisa Reid
- 2. Lucy Wallace
- 3. Nicola O'Malley
- 4. Saoirse Lally (c)
- 5. Kathryn Sullivan
- 6. Danielle Caldwell
- 7. Jenna Mortimer
- 8. Aoife Geraghty
- 9. Hannah Reape
- 10. Fionnuala McLaughlin
- 11. Sinead Walsh
- 12. Maria Cannon
- 13. Tara Needham
- 14. Fiona McHale
- 15. Lisa Cafferky

Substitutes

- Annie Gough for Lucy Wallace (H.T.)
- Emily Reape for Kathryn Sullivan (H.T.)
- Emma Needham for Fiona McHale (46')
- Alana Fitzpatrick for Hannah Reape (51')
- Niamh Mooney for Tara Needham (59')

2024 Mayo Starting XV (Rd. 3 League Campaign) vs Dublin

Starting Team

- 1. Laura Brennan
- 2. Emma Needham
- 3. Nicola O'Malley
- 4. Saoirse Lally (c)
- 5. Kathryn Sullivan
- 6. Danielle Caldwell
- 7. Jenna Mortimer
- 8. Aoife Geraghty
- 9. Hannah Reape
- 10. Fionnuala McLaughlin
- 11. Alana Fitzpatrick
- 12. Sinead Walsh
- 13. Tara Needham
- 14. Fiona McHale
- 15. Lisa Cafferky

Substitutes

- Maria Cannon for Tara Needham (H.T.)
- Emily Reape for Alana Fitzpatrick (38')
- Niamh Mooney for Emma Needham (43')
- Ciara Durkin for Kathryn Sullivan (47')
- Chelsea Doherty for Danielle Caldwell (54')

2024 Mayo Starting XV (Rd. 4 League Campaign) vs Kerry

Starting Team

- 1. Laura Brennan
- 2. Alana Fitzpatrick
- 3. Nicola O'Malley
- 4. Saoirse Lally (c)
- 5. Kathryn Sullivan
- 6. Sinead Cafferky
- 7. Erin Murray
- 8. Aoife Geraghty
- 9. Hannah Reape
- 10. Fionnuala McLaughlin
- 11. Lisa Cafferky
- 12. Maria Cannon
- 13. Tara Needham
- 14. Fiona McHale
- 15. Sinead Walsh

Substitutes

- Jenna Mortimer for Erin Murray (42')
- Emma Needham for Sinead Cafferky (44')
- Emily Reape for Alana Fitzpatrick (51')
- Ciara Doherty for Tara Needham (56')

2024 Mayo Starting XV (Rd. 5 League Campaign) vs Cork

Starting Team

- 1. Laura Brennan
- 2. Alana Fitzpatrick
- 3. Nicola O'Malley
- 4. Saoirse Lally (c)
- 5. Kathryn Sullivan
- 6. Danielle Caldwell
- 7. Jenna Mortimer
- 8. Aoife Geraghty
- 9. Hannah Reape
- 10. Fionnula McLaughlin
- 11. Lisa Cafferky
- 12. Maria Cannon
- 13. Tara Needham
- 14. Fiona McHale
- 15. Sinead Walsh

Substitutes

- Chelsea Doherty for Tara Needham (24')
- Ciara Durkin for Kathryn Sullivan (H.T.)
- Emma Needham for Lisa Cafferky (47')

2024 Mayo Starting XV (Rd. 6 League Campaign) vs Armagh

Starting Team

- 1. Laura Brennan
- 2. Danielle Caldwell
- 3. Nicola O'Malley
- 4. Saoirse Lally (c)
- 5. Kathryn Sullivan
- 6. Erin Murray
- 7. Jenna Mortimer
- 8. Aoife Geraghty
- 9. Hannah Reape
- 10. Fionnula McLaughlin
- 11. Alana Fitzpatrick
- 12. Maria Cannon
- 13. Sinead Cafferky
- 14. Lisa Cafferky
- 15. Sinead Walsh

Substitutes

- Ciara Needham for Jenna Mortimer (H.T.)
- Saoirse Delaney for Alana Fitzpatrick (H.T.)
- Ciara Durkan for Kathryn Sullivan (45')
- Éilis Ronayne for Erin Murray (45')
- Aoife Staunton for Lisa Cafferky (49')

2024 Mayo Starting XV (Rd. 7 League Campaign) vs Waterford

Starting Team

- 1. Laura Brennan
- 2. Eilis Ronayne
- 3. Nicola O'Malley
- 4. Danielle Caldwell
- 5. Kathryn Sullivan
- 6. Erin Murray
- 7. Ciara Needham
- 8. Aoife Geraghty (c)
- 9. Hannah Reape
- 10. Fionnula McLaughlin
- 11. Saoirse Delaney
- 12. Maria Cannon
- 13. Sinead Cafferky
- 14. Lisa Cafferky
- 15. Sinead Walsh

Substitutes

- Alana Fitzpatrick for Hannah Reape (H.T.)
- Ciara Durkan for Erin Murray (36')
- Aoife Staunton for Lisa Cafferky (44')
- Emma Needham for Sinead Cafferky (48')
- Fiona McHale for Ciara Needham (48')
- Tara Needham for Saoirse Delaney (57')

==== Group Results ====
Key to colours
| Advance to Division 1 Finals |
| Relegation |

| Team | Pld | W | D | L | Group Points | Score Difference |
|---|---|---|---|---|---|---|
| Armagh | 7 | 6 | 0 | 1 | 18 | +3 |
| Kerry | 7 | 5 | 1 | 1 | 16 | +35 |
| Dublin | 7 | 5 | 0 | 2 | 15 | +37 |
| Meath | 7 | 4 | 0 | 3 | 12 | -6 |
| Mayo | 7 | 3 | 1 | 3 | 10 | -8 |
| Galway | 6 | 1 | 0 | 5 | 3 | -5 |
| Waterford | 6 | 1 | 0 | 5 | 3 | -13 |
| Cork | 7 | 1 | 0 | 6 | 3 | -43 |

==== Scoring List ====
| Player | Club | Club Colours | Goals | Points | Total Points |
|---|---|---|---|---|---|
| Maria Cannon | Burrishoole | | 1 | 24 | 27 |
| Lisa Cafferky | Kilmovee Shamrocks | | 4 | 12 | 24 |
| Sinéad Walsh | Mac Hale Rovers | | 1 | 8 | 11 |
| Fionnuala McLaughlin | Westport | | 2 | 1 | 7 |
| Aoife Geraghty | Westport | | 0 | 5 | 5 |
| Saoirse Delaney | St. Marys Aghamore | | 1 | 1 | 4 |
| Sinéad Cafferky | Kilmovee Shamrocks | | 0 | 4 | 4 |
| Ciara Needham | Louisburgh | | 0 | 2 | 2 |
| Alana Fitzpatrick | Claremorris | | 0 | 1 | 1 |
| Aoife Staunton | Westport | | 0 | 1 | 1 |
| Fiona McHale | Carnacon | | 0 | 1 | 1 |
| Kathryn Sullivan | Castlebar Mitchels | | 0 | 1 | 1 |
| Tara Needham | Louisburgh | | 0 | 1 | 1 |

==== 2024 League Statistics ====
| 2023 | League Statistics |
|---|---|
| Games | 7 |
| Total Score | 89 points |
| Total Score Conceded | 97 points (8–73) |
| Goals | 9 |
| Points | 62 |
| 1st Half (Total Score) | 52 points |
| Avg Pts (1st Half) | 7 points |
| 2nd Half (Total Score) | 37 points |
| Avg Pts (2nd Half) | 5 points |
| No. of Scoring Players | 12 |
| Top Scorer | Maria Cannon (1–24) 27 pts |

== All-Stars ==
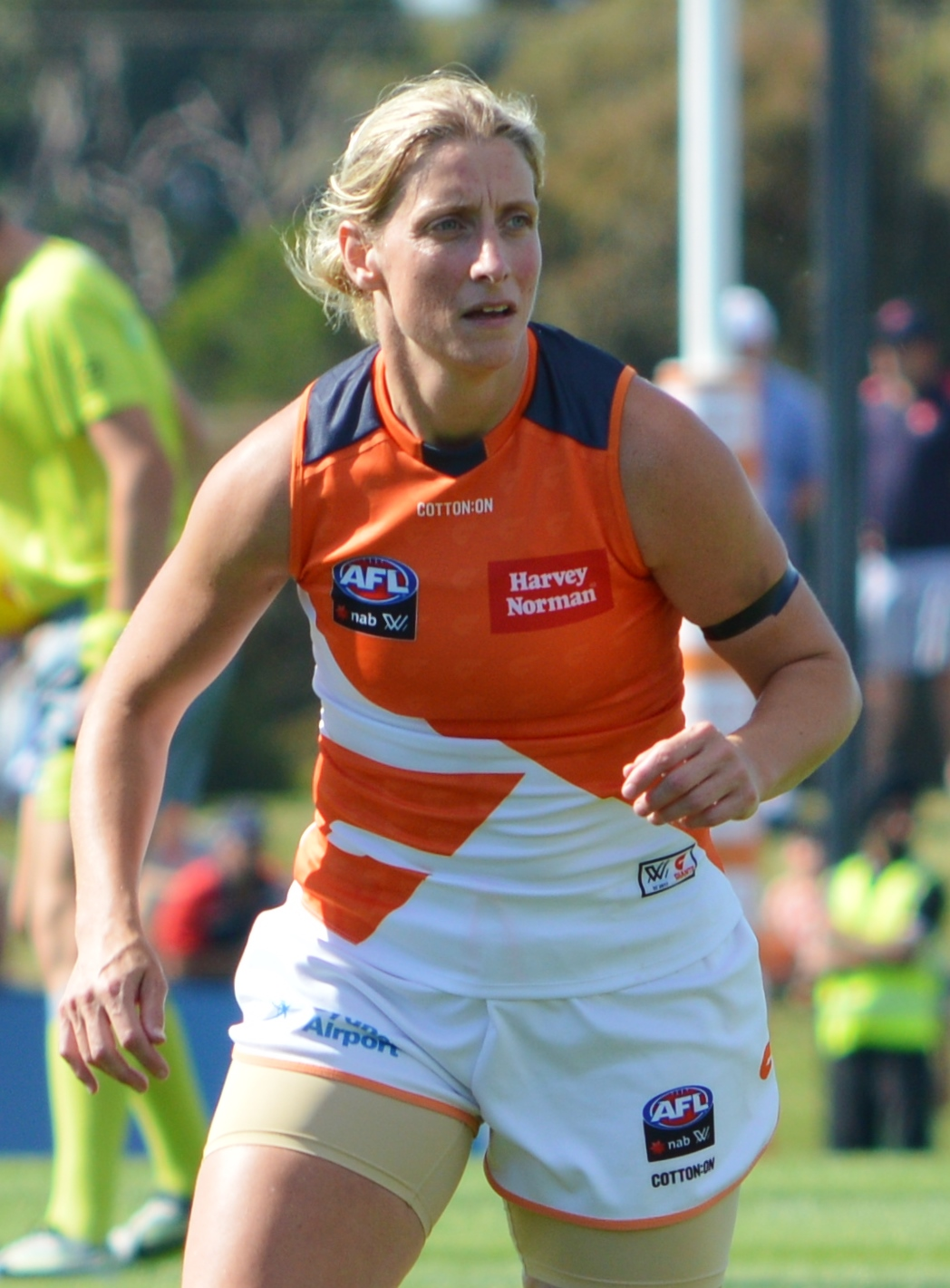
11× All-Star Cora Staunton playing in the AFLW, February 2018.

| Season | Player(s) |
|---|---|
| 2023 | Danielle Caldwell |
| 2022 | Danielle Caldwell, Shauna Howley |
| 2021 | Rachel Kearns |
| 2019 | Rachel Kearns |
| 2017 | Sarah Tierney, Aileen Gilroy, Cora Staunton |
| 2016 | Fiona McHale |
| 2015 | Cora Staunton |
| 2013 | Yvonne Byrne, Cora Staunton |
| 2012 | Cora Staunton |
| 2009 | Noelle Tierney, Martha Carter, Cora Staunton |
| 2008 | Cora Staunton |
| 2007 | Claire O’Hara, Cora Staunton |
| 2005 | Claire Egan |
| 2004 | Helena Lohan, Claire Egan, Cora Staunton |
| 2003 | Nuala O’Shea, Helena Lohan, Christina Heffernan, Michelle McGing |
| 2002 | Helena Lohan, Claire Egan, Christina Heffernan, Cora Staunton |
| 2001 | Denise Horan, Marcella Heffernan, Christina Heffernan, Cora Staunton |
| 2000 | Denise Horan, Marcella Heffernan, Helena Lohan, Christina Heffernan, Diane O’Hora, Cora Staunton |
| 1999 | Denise Horan, Marcella Heffernan, Christina Heffernan |
| 1998 | Christina Heffernan |
| 1996 | Christina Heffernan |
| 1995 | Bernie O’Neill, Patricia Mullen |
| 1994 | Diane O’Hora |
| 1993 | Bernie O’Neill |
| 1992 | Pauline Mullen |

== Captains ==
| Year | Name |
|---|---|
| 2023 | Kathryn Sullivan |
| 2022 | Kathryn Sullivan |
| 2021 | Clodagh McManamon |
| 2020 | Sinéad Cafferky |
| 2019 | Niamh Kelly |
| 2018 | Sarah Tierney |
| 2017 | Sarah Tierney |
| 2016 | Sarah Tierney |
| 2015 | Cora Staunton |
| 2014 | Fiona McHale |
| 2013 | Fiona McHale |
| 2012 | Claire Egan |
| 2011 | Yvonne Byrne |
| 2010 | (None) |
| 2009 | Martha Carter |
| 2008 | Claire O'Hara |
| 2007 | Christina Heffernan |
| 2006 | Cora Staunton |
| 2005 | Claire Egan |
| 2004 | Nuala O'Shea |
| 2003 | Helena Lohan |
| 2002 | Christina Heffernan |
| 2001 | Denise Horan |
| 2000 | Maria Staunton |
| 1999 | Diane O'Hora |

== Managers ==
| Manager | Years |
|---|---|
| Liam McHale | 2023–present |
| Michael Moyles | 2021–2023 |
| Peter Leahy | 2018–2020 |
| Frank Browne | 2015–2017 |
| Peter Clarke | 2013–2014 |
| Jimmy Corbett | 2012 |
| Mike Murphy | 2012 |
| Jason Taniane | 2011 |
| Mike Murphy | 2010 (July-Dec) |
| Pat Costello | 2010 (Jan-May) |
| Kevin Reidy | 2009 |
| Michael Ryder | 2008 |
| Frank Browne | 2007 |
| Charlie Lambert | 2006 |
| Tommy Walsh | 2005 (May-Jan 2006) |
| Noel Kearney | 2005 (May-Jan 2006) |
| Danny Fahey | 2005 (May-Jan 2006) |
| Stephen Bourke | 2005 (May-Jan 2006) |
| Con Moynihan | 2005 (Jan-Apr) |
| Finbar Egan | 1998–2004 |
| John Mullin | 1998–2001 |

== AFLW ==
In recent years, the Women's Australian Football League (AFLW) has recruited several former and current players from Mayo to play in the Australian league.

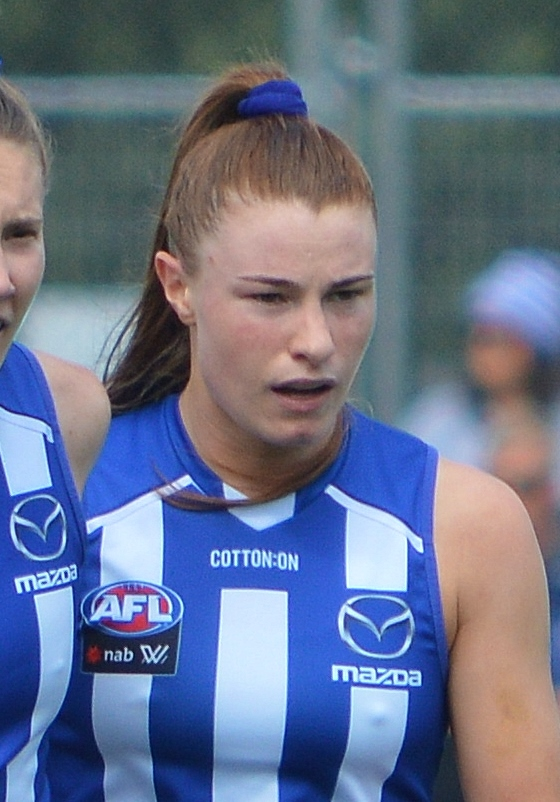
Former Mayo Midfielder Aileen Gilroy playing for North Melbourne in the AFLW, March 2021.

| Name | Team | Years Active |
|---|---|---|
| Cora Staunton | GWS Giants | 2018–2022 |
| Sarah Rowe | Collingwood | 2019–present |
| Aileen Gilroy | North Melbourne | 2020–2022 |
| | Hawthorn | 2022–present |
| Grace Kelly | West Coast Eagles | 2020–2022 |
| | St Kilda's FCW | 2022–present |
| Niamh Kelly | West Coast Eagles | 2020–2022 |
| | Adelaide | 2022–present |
| Rachel Kearns | Geelong Cats | 2021–present |

== Kit ==
Though the design of the Mayo kit changes each year, certain features remain. The colour scheme of Mayo is green, red and white. Mayo jerseys are mostly green with a red banner on the front, where the main sponsors logo is seen, and white, usually on the collar or shoulder area. The colour of shorts are red with small sections of white and green, which differ from the men's white kit. This is to address period concerns for female players. Socks are usually red with green stripes. The away jerseys differ vastly year to year, as do the goalkeepers jersey. Mayo LGFA, Mayo GAA and Mayo Camogie all use the same kit, with the exception of the difference in shorts colour. The 2024 home jersey can be seen here.

Standard Home Kit

== Sponsors ==
| Year | Kit Manufacturer | Shirt Sponsor (Chest) | Shirt Sponsor (Back) |
|---|---|---|---|
| 1998 | O'Neills | Walsh Coaches | |
| 1999 | O'Neills | Advanced Roofing | |
| 2000–2002 | O'Neills | CBE | |
| 2003 | Azzurri | CBE | |
| 2004–2015 | O'Neills | CBE | |
| 2016 | O'Neills | Elverys | |
| 2017 | O'Neills | Intersport Elverys | |
| 2021- | O'Neills | Intersport Elverys | Portwest |

== Mayo Senior LGFA Clubs ==
| Team | Colours |
|---|---|
| Achill | |
| Balla | |
| Ballinrobe | |
| Ballyhaunis | |
| Béal an Mhuirthead | |
| Bonniconlon | |
| Breaffy | |
| Burrishoole | |
| Carnacon | |
| Castlebar Mitchels | |
| Charlestown Sarsfields | |
| Cill Chomáin | |
| Cill tSeadhna | |
| Claremorris | |
| Davitts | |
| Hollymount | |
| Islandeady | |
| Kilmaine | |
| Kilmeena | |
| Kilmoremoy | |
| Kilmovee Shamrocks | |
| Kiltimagh | |
| Knockmore | |
| Louisburgh | |
| Mac Hale Rovers | |
| Moy Davitts | |
| Parke Keelogues Crimlin | |
| St. Brigids | |
| St. Marys Aghamore | |
| Swinford Killaser | |
| The Neale | |
| Tuar Mhic Éadaigh | |
| Westport | |

== Championship Results ==
| Season | Season Finish | Score Line in Final Game (Mayo on left) | Versus |
|---|---|---|---|
| 2023 | Semi-Final | 1–11 to 1–16 | Kerry |
| 2022 | Semi-Final | 0–13 to 4–10 | Kerry |
| 2021 | Semi-Final | 2–09 to 1–17 | Dublin |
| 2020 | Group stage | 1–16 to 4–12 | Armagh |
| 2019 | Semi-Final | 2–09 to 2–10 | Galway |
| 2018 | Quarter-final | 0–12 to 5–11 | Galway |
| 2017 | Runner-up | 0–11 to 4–11 | Dublin |
| 2016 | Semi-Final | 1–12 to 2–10 | Dublin |
| 2015 | Quarter-final | 1–08 to 2–13 | Kerry |
| 2014 | Quarter-final | 0–09 to 1–15 | Cork |
| 2013 | Quarter-final | 2–13 to 2–14 | Kerry |
| 2012 | Quarter-final | 2–14 to 4–15 | Monaghan |
| 2011 | Quarter-final | 0–10 to 3–11 | Kerry |
| 2010 | Qualifier | 1–08 to 0–12 | Kerry |
| 2009 | Semi-Final | 1–09 to 3–10 | Cork |
| 2008 | Semi-Final | 1–12 to 2–16 | Monaghan |
| 2007 | Runner-up | 2–06 to 2–11 | Cork |
| 2006 | Quarter-final | 1–11 to 2–12 | Cork |
| 2005 | Semi-Final | 1–09 to 0–13 | Cork |
| 2004 | Semi-Final | Replay: 3–09 to 3–10 | Galway |
| 2003 | Winner | 1–04 to 0–05 | Dublin |
| 2002 | Winner | 0–12 to 1–08 | Monaghan |
| 2001 | Runner-up | 1–16 to 2–14 | Laois |
| 2000 | Winner | 3–06 to 0–14 | Waterford |
| 1999 | Winner | 0–12 to 0–08 | Waterford |
| 1998 | Semi-Final | 1–04 to 1–15 | Waterford |
| 1997 | Semi-Final | 1–08 to 3–11 | Monaghan |
| 1996 | Semi-Final | 0–19 to 3–14 | Laois |
| 1995 | Semi-Final | 1–04 to 1–19 | Waterford |
| 1994 | Semi-Final | 0–06 to 1–12 | Monaghan |
| 1993 | Semi-Final | Replay: 2–05 to 3–16 | Laois |
| 1992 | DQ'd | Disqualified for breach of rules | Galway |
| 1991 | Semi-Final | 1–04 to 1–05 | Clare |

== League results ==
| Year | Division | Result |
|---|---|---|
| 2024 | 1 | 5th |
| 2023 | 1 | 6th |
| 2022 | 1 | Semi-Final |
| 2021 | 1 | Semi-Final |
| 2020 | 1 | 3rd |
| 2019 | 1 | 5th |
| 2018 | 1 | Runner-Up |
| 2017 | 1 | 5th |
| 2016 | 1 | Runner-Up |
| 2015 | 1 | 6th |
| 2014 | 1 | 5th |
| 2013 | 1 | Runner-Up |
| 2012 | 2 | Winner |
| 2011 | 1 | Relegated |
| 2010 | 1 | 5th |
| 2009 | 1 | Runner-Up |
| 2008 | 1 | 5th |
| 2007 | 1 | Winner |
| 2006 | 1 | Semi-Final |
| 2005 | 1 | Semi-Final |
| 2004 | 1 | Winner |
| 2003 | 1 | Semi-Final |
| 2002 | 1 | Runner-Up |
| 2001 | 1 | Semi-Final |
| 2000 | 1 | Winner |
| 1999 | 1 | Semi-Final |
| 1998 | 1 | |
| 1997 | 1 | |
| 1996 | 1 | Runner-Up |
| 1995 | 1 | Runner-Up |
| 1994 | 1 | Runner-Up |

== Honours ==
- All-Ireland Senior Ladies' Football Championship
  - Winners: 1999, 2000, 2002, 2003.
  - Runners up: 2001, 2007, 2017.
- Ladies' National Football League Div. 1
  - Winners: 2000, 2004, 2007.
  - Runners up: 1994, 1995, 1996, 2002, 2009, 2013, 2016, 2018.
- Ladies' National Football League Div. 2
  - Winners: 2012.
  - Runners up: 1991.
- Connacht Senior Ladies' Football Championship
  - Winners: 1976, 1988, 1989, 1990, 2002, 2003, 2007, 2008, 2011, 2016, 2023.
- All-Ireland Intermediate Championship
  - Winners: 1993.
- All-Ireland Junior Ladies' Championship
  - Winners: 1987.
- All-Ireland Under-18 Ladies' Football Championship
  - Winners: 1987.
- All-Ireland Under-16 Ladies' Football Championships
  - Winners: 1976.
- All-Ireland Under-16 B Ladies' Football Championships
  - Winners: 2010, 2018.
- All-Ireland Under-14 Ladies' Football Championships
  - Winners: 1994.
- All-Ireland Under-14 B Ladies' Football Championships
  - Winners: 2008, 2018.
