= List of Cypriot football transfers summer 2015 =

This is a list of Cypriot football transfers for the 2015–16 summer transfer window by club. Only transfers of clubs in the Cypriot First Division and Cypriot Second Division are included.

The summer transfer window opened on 1 June 2015, although a few transfers took place prior to that date. The window closed at midnight on 31 August 2015. Players without a club may join one at any time, either during or in between transfer windows.

== Cypriot First Division ==
=== AEK Larnaca ===
In: Note: Flags indicate national team as defined under FIFA eligibility rules; some limited exceptions apply. Players may hold more than one non-FIFA nationality.

No.	Pos.	Nation	Player
20	MF	CYP	Vincent Laban (from (Romania) Astra Giurgiu)
17	FW	CYP	Vassilis Chatzigiannakou (from Othellos Athienou)
3	DF	POL	Adam Marciniak (from (Poland) KS Cracovia)
9	FW	BRA	Andre Alves (from (Greece) Panetolikos)
11	MF	ESP	Tete (from (Spain) Real Murcia)
16	DF	ROU	Emil Ninu (from (Bulgaria) Levski Sofia)
1	GK	POL	Mateusz Taudul (from (Poland) Nadwiślan Góra)
13	GK	ESP	Mikel Saizar (from (Spain) Córdoba CF)
4	DF	ESP	Albert Serrán (from Anorthosis Famagusta)

Out: Note: Flags indicate national team as defined under FIFA eligibility rules; some limited exceptions apply. Players may hold more than one non-FIFA nationality.

No.	Pos.	Nation	Player
30	DF	BEL	Jordan Atheba (released)
9	FW	ISR	Roberto Colautti (retired)
20	MF	GRE	Giannis Skopelitis (to Nea Salamina)
12	MF	BRA	Vander Vieira (to APOEL)
23	GK	CYP	Zannetos Mytidis (to Ethnikos Achna)
11	MF	CYP	Kyriacos Pavlou (to Nea Salamina U21)
17	MF	CYP	Dimitris Froxylias (to Enosis Neon Paralimni)
1	GK	CYP	Alexandre Negri (to Doxa Katokopias)
37	FW	CYP	Andreas Mangouris (to Nea Salamina U21)
16	MF	ESP	Miguel Massana (to (Spain) Ascó)
3	DF	GEQ	Sipo (to (Spain) Olímpic Xàtiva)
24	FW	CYP	Paraskevas Choutris (on loan to ASIL Lysi)

=== AEL Limassol ===
In: Note: Flags indicate national team as defined under FIFA eligibility rules; some limited exceptions apply. Players may hold more than one non-FIFA nationality.

No.	Pos.	Nation	Player
—	FW	CYP	Minas Antoniou (loan return from AEZ Zakakiou)
60	MF	CPV	Marco Soares (from (Angola) 1º Agosto)
32	GK	ARG	Matías Degra (from (Moldova) Sheriff Tiraspol)
81	MF	CYP	Andreas Fragkou (from Apollon Limassol)
56	MF	CYP	Panos Theodorou (from Aris Limassol)
3	DF	FRA	Bertrand Robert (from Apollon Limassol)
7	FW	VEN	Frank Feltscher (from (Switzerland) Aarau)
50	DF	POR	João Paulo (from Apollon Limassol)
1	GK	POL	Łukasz Skowron (from (Poland) Arka Gdynia)
19	FW	CYP	Yiannis Mavrou (from Olympiakos Nicosia)
5	DF	GRE	Angelos Zoulis (from (Greece) Panathinaikos U21)
15	DF	GRE	Vasilios Karagounis (on loan from (Greece) Olympiacos)
17	MF	POR	Mesca (from (England) Fulham)
8	MF	FRA	Mathieu Coutadeur (from (France) Lorient)
6	MF	GHA	John Arwuah (from (South Africa) AmaZulu)
20	FW	SEN	Mame Niang (on loan from (South Africa) Mamelodi Sundowns)

Out: Note: Flags indicate national team as defined under FIFA eligibility rules; some limited exceptions apply. Players may hold more than one non-FIFA nationality.

No.	Pos.	Nation	Player
11	MF	POR	Carlitos (loan return to Doxa Katokopias)
1	GK	MAR	Karim Fegrouch (to (Morocco) FAR Rabat)
30	GK	ESP	Pulpo Romero (to (Romania) FC Rapid București)
5	MF	ARG	Esteban Sachetti (to Apollon Limassol)
19	DF	BRA	Edmar (to Doxa Katokopias)
32	FW	ROU	Alexandru Ioniță (to (Poland) Zawisza Bydgoszcz)
25	DF	FRA	Bernard Mendy (to (India) Chennaiyin)
23	DF	CPV	Carlitos (to (Greece) Iraklis)
20	MF	BRA	Luciano Bebê (to Omonia)
33	MF	MTN	Diallo Guidileye (to (France) AS Nancy)
14	MF	CYP	Leandros Lillis (to Ermis Aradippou)
7	FW	NGR	Marco Tagbajumi (on loan to (Norway) Strømsgodset IF)
12	MF	CYP	Marios Nicolaou (to (Greece) Levadiakos)
—	FW	CYP	Minas Antoniou (to Aris Limassol)

=== Anorthosis Famagusta ===
In: Note: Flags indicate national team as defined under FIFA eligibility rules; some limited exceptions apply. Players may hold more than one non-FIFA nationality.

No.	Pos.	Nation	Player
54	MF	CYP	Theofilos Chrysochos (loan return from Ormidia)
70	MF	CYP	Adamos Chatzigeorgiou (loan return from ASIL)
40	GK	ALB	Aldo Teqja (loan return from Elpida Xylofagou)
37	MF	CYP	Zacharias Theodorou (loan return from Ayia Napa)
35	DF	CYP	Panayiotis Loizides (loan return from Nea Salamina)
16	GK	FRA	Mathieu Valverde (loan return from Ethnikos Achna)
77	FW	POR	Esmaël Gonçalves (from (Portugal) Rio Ave)
9	FW	RSA	Dino Ndlovu (from (Israel) Maccabi Haifa)
19	MF	BRA	João Victor (from (Spain) RCD Mallorca)
88	GK	SLO	Jan Koprivec (from (Italy) Perugia)
17	DF	GRE	Manolis Tzanakakis (on loan from (Greece) Olympiacos)
2	DF	BRA	Gabriel (from (Portugal) Gil Vicente)
23	DF	FRA	Léo Schwechlen (from (France) Tours)
10	MF	ARG	Nicolás Martínez (on loan from (Greece) Olympiacos)
11	FW	ESP	Andrea Orlandi (from (England) Blackpool)
4	MF	POR	Pelé (from (Greece) Olympiacos)
20	FW	GRE	Efthimis Koulouris (on loan from (Greece) PAOK)

Out: Note: Flags indicate national team as defined under FIFA eligibility rules; some limited exceptions apply. Players may hold more than one non-FIFA nationality.

No.	Pos.	Nation	Player
12	GK	BEL	Thomas Kaminski (loan return to (Belgium) Anderlecht)
17	MF	GER	Chinedu Ede (loan return to (Germany) 1. FSV Mainz 05)
2	DF	SRB	Marko Andić (to Nea Salamina)
3	DF	ESP	Albert Serrán (to AEK Larnaca)
11	FW	UKR	Yuriy Yakovenko (released)
41	MF	GRE	Grigoris Makos (to (Greece) Panetolikos)
24	DF	CYP	Jason Demetriou (to (England) Walsall)
32	GK	CYP	Gavriel Constantinou (to Enosis Neon Paralimni)
77	FW	POR	Esmaël Gonçalves (to (Saudi Arabia) Ettifaq FC)
10	FW	URU	Gonzalo García (on loan to (Netherlands) Heracles Almelo)
35	DF	CYP	Panayiotis Loizides (on loan to Ayia Napa)
36	MF	CYP	Adamos Andreou (on loan to Omonia Aradippou)

=== APOEL ===
In: Note: Flags indicate national team as defined under FIFA eligibility rules; some limited exceptions apply. Players may hold more than one non-FIFA nationality.

No.	Pos.	Nation	Player
95	MF	CYP	Christos Djamas (loan return from Ayia Napa)
90	DF	BRA	Guilherme Choco (free agent)
77	MF	BRA	Vander Vieira (from AEK Larnaca)
1	GK	ESP	Jordi Codina (from (Spain) Getafe)
17	MF	BIH	Semir Štilić (from (Poland) Wisła Kraków)
13	MF	CYP	Constantinos Makrides (from (Ukraine) Metalurh Donetsk)
9	FW	POR	Luís Leal (from (United Arab Emirates) Al-Ittihad Kalba)
23	DF	ESP	Iñaki Astiz (from (Poland) Legia Warsaw)
27	FW	POL	Mateusz Piątkowski (from (Poland) Jagiellonia Białystok)
99	GK	NED	Boy Waterman (from (Turkey) Karabükspor)
79	FW	ARG	Fernando Cavenaghi (from (Argentina) River Plate)

Out: Note: Flags indicate national team as defined under FIFA eligibility rules; some limited exceptions apply. Players may hold more than one non-FIFA nationality.

No.	Pos.	Nation	Player
21	MF	BRA	Gustavo Manduca (retired)
22	GK	GRE	Dionisis Chiotis (to (Greece) Panelefsiniakos)
9	FW	IRL	Cillian Sheridan (to Omonia)
6	DF	NOR	John Arne Riise (to (India) Delhi Dynamos)
8	MF	POR	Tiago Gomes (released)
25	DF	CYP	Andreas Christofides (to Olympiakos Nicosia)
13	MF	GER	Martin Lanig (retired)
79	FW	ALG	Rafik Djebbour (to (Greece) AEK Athens)
73	DF	BRA	Kaká (to (Portugal) Tondela)
14	MF	CYP	Alex Konstantinou (on loan to Doxa Katokopias)
23	DF	CYP	Bruno Pereira (to (Greece) Xanthi)
35	FW	CYP	Marios Pechlivanis (to Austria Wien II)
9	FW	POR	Luís Leal (on loan to (Portugal) Belenenses)

=== Apollon Limassol ===
In: Note: Flags indicate national team as defined under FIFA eligibility rules; some limited exceptions apply. Players may hold more than one non-FIFA nationality.

No.	Pos.	Nation	Player
—	MF	CYP	Kyriacos Panagi (loan return from AEZ Zakakiou)
48	DF	CYP	Chrysis Antoniou (loan return from APEP)
92	FW	CAN	Daniel Haber (loan return from Ayia Napa)
13	DF	COL	David Mena (loan return from Ayia Napa)
10	MF	BRA	Alex da Silva (from (Ukraine) Metalurh Donetsk)
5	MF	ARG	Esteban Sachetti (from AEL Limassol)
2	DF	BRA	Elízio (from (Portugal) Moreirense)
17	FW	POR	João Pedro (on loan from (Portugal) Braga)
4	DF	BRA	Freire (from (Portugal) Nacional)
14	DF	POR	Jaime (on loan from (Portugal) União Madeira)
18	MF	BUL	Simeon Slavchev (on loan from (Portugal) Sporting CP)
11	MF	CRO	Dejan Mezga (from (Croatia) Hajduk Split)

Out: Note: Flags indicate national team as defined under FIFA eligibility rules; some limited exceptions apply. Players may hold more than one non-FIFA nationality.

No.	Pos.	Nation	Player
14	MF	FRA	Camel Meriem (retired)
56	MF	MAR	Rachid Hamdani (to (Greece) Asteras Tripolis)
20	MF	FRA	Bertrand Robert (to AEL Limassol)
17	FW	ESP	Hugo López (to (Israel) Hapoel Kfar Saba)
29	DF	RWA	Edwin Ouon (to (Greece) Levadiakos)
50	DF	POR	João Paulo Andrade (to AEL Limassol)
18	MF	BRA	Elton Figueiredo (to (Greece) Skoda Xanthi)
10	FW	ARG	Gastón Sangoy (to (Qatar) Al-Wakrah)
97	MF	CYP	Andreas Fragkou (to AEL Limassol)
92	FW	CAN	Daniel Haber (to (Israel) Hapoel Nir Ramat HaSharon)
13	DF	COL	Jhoan David Rojas (to (Mexico) Cimarrones de Sonora)
48	DF	CYP	Chrysis Antoniou (to Enosis Neon Parekklisia)
—	MF	CYP	Kyriacos Panagi (to Aris Limassol)
45	DF	CYP	Renos Christodoulou (on loan to Enosis Neon Parekklisia)
43	MF	CYP	Stelios Tampouris (on loan to Enosis Neon Parekklisia)

=== Aris Limassol ===
In: Note: Flags indicate national team as defined under FIFA eligibility rules; some limited exceptions apply. Players may hold more than one non-FIFA nationality.

No.	Pos.	Nation	Player
12	MF	CYP	Sergios Panayiotou (loan return from AEZ Zakakiou)
1	GK	CYP	Giorgos Loizou (from Ethnikos Achna)
36	DF	MLT	Steve Borg (from (Malta) Valletta)
9	FW	ARG	Silvio González (free agent)
6	MF	POL	Roger Guerreiro (from (Brazil) Rio Branco)
5	DF	BRA	Douglas Ozias (from (Brazil) Trindade)
7	MF	CYP	Valentinos Pastelis (from Amathous Agiou Tychona)
22	FW	CYP	Minas Antoniou (from AEL Limassol)
30	MF	CYP	Kyriacos Panagi (from Apollon Limassol)
33	GK	SVK	Marián Kello (from (Scotland) St Mirren)
10	FW	SLE	Moustapha Bangura (free agent)
—	MF	GRE	Andreas Labropoulos (from (Greece) OFI Crete)
32	FW	CYP	Evangelos Kyriacou (from Othellos Athienou)
8	DF	BRA	Marco Aurélio (from Nea Salamina)
23	DF	RSA	Roger Da Costa (from (South Africa) Mpumalanga Black Aces)
44	DF	CYP	Andreas Pachipis (from (England) Hyde United)
18	MF	GEQ	Randy (from (Greece) Iraklis Psachna)
19	FW	NGR	Mathew Boniface (from (Sudan) Al-Hilal)
15	GK	MKD	Edin Nuredinoski (free agent)
88	MF	ESP	Jose Pedrosa Galan (free agent)

Out: Note: Flags indicate national team as defined under FIFA eligibility rules; some limited exceptions apply. Players may hold more than one non-FIFA nationality.

No.	Pos.	Nation	Player
5	DF	ROU	Bogdan Panait (to (Romania) FCM Dunărea Galați)
7	DF	CYP	Menelaos Aristidou (released)
15	DF	CYP	Andreas Niokka (to Nikos & Sokratis Erimis)
30	MF	CYP	Simos Krassas (to AEZ Zakakiou)
1	GK	CYP	Simos Tsiakkas (to Omonia Aradippou)
17	MF	CYP	Emilios Panayiotou (to Doxa Katokopias)
32	FW	CYP	Michalis Sykas (to Enosis Neon Parekklisia)
9	FW	CYP	Marcos Michael (to Nea Salamina)
99	FW	CYP	Charalambos Pittakas (released)
6	MF	CYP	Panos Theodorou (to AEL Limassol)
18	MF	CPV	Bruno Spencer (released)
19	FW	ESP	Carlitos (to (Spain) CD Eldense)
50	DF	CYP	Constantinos Alexandrou (to AEZ Zakakiou)
89	GK	CYP	Panos Constantinou (to (Greece) Apollon Kalamarias)
22	DF	PAR	Ivo Carosini (released)
—	MF	GRE	Andreas Labropoulos (to (Greece) AEL)
31	MF	CYP	Constantinos Hadjittofis (to Nikos & Sokratis Erimis)
12	MF	CYP	Sergios Panayiotou (to AEZ Zakakiou)

=== Ayia Napa ===
In: Note: Flags indicate national team as defined under FIFA eligibility rules; some limited exceptions apply. Players may hold more than one non-FIFA nationality.

No.	Pos.	Nation	Player
20	MF	CYP	Antonis Katsis (from Nea Salamina)
9	FW	SRB	Uroš Stojanov (from (Bosnia and Herzegovina) Zvijezda Gradačac)
11	MF	NGR	Joseph Femi (from (Angola) Recreativo da Caála)
4	DF	SRB	Nebojša Skopljak (from (Hungary) Kecskeméti TE)
30	GK	SLO	Marko Pridigar (from (Slovenia) NK Zavrč)
17	FW	CYP	Antonis Moulazimis (from Enosis Neon Paralimni U21)
5	MF	GRE	Giorgos Lambropoulos (from Nea Salamina)
10	MF	SLO	Anej Lovrečič (from (Serbia) FK Voždovac)
35	DF	CYP	Panayiotis Loizides (on loan from Anorthosis Famagusta)
77	FW	CYP	Giorgos Katsiatis (on loan from Ermis Aradippou)
27	FW	BRA	Ibson de Melo (from Ethnikos Achna)
91	FW	NED	Darren Maatsen (from (Netherlands) Den Bosch)

Out: Note: Flags indicate national team as defined under FIFA eligibility rules; some limited exceptions apply. Players may hold more than one non-FIFA nationality.

No.	Pos.	Nation	Player
2	MF	CYP	Christos Djamas (loan return to APOEL)
10	FW	CAN	Daniel Haber (loan return to Apollon Limassol)
15	DF	COL	David Mena (loan return to Apollon Limassol)
26	MF	CYP	Zacharias Theodorou (loan return to Anorthosis Famagusta)
29	FW	CYP	Angelos Siatha (loan return to Nea Salamina)
77	MF	CRO	Ivan Ćurjurić (to Nea Salamina)
1	GK	GRE	Grigorios Athanasiou (to (Greece) Ergotelis)
17	DF	CYP	Antonis Koudellis (to Omonia Aradippou)
27	DF	CYP	Petros Messios (to Omonia Aradippou)
21	MF	BUL	Vasil Panayotov (to (Poland) Zawisza Bydgoszcz)
11	MF	BUL	Veselin Marchev (to Nea Salamina)

=== Doxa Katokopias ===
In: Note: Flags indicate national team as defined under FIFA eligibility rules; some limited exceptions apply. Players may hold more than one non-FIFA nationality.

No.	Pos.	Nation	Player
11	MF	POR	Carlitos (loan return from AEL Limassol)
17	MF	CYP	Pantelis Vasiliou (loan return from PAEEK FC)
22	FW	CYP	Kyriacos Vasiliou (loan return from PAEEK FC)
93	GK	CYP	Nicolas Anastasiou (loan return from Olympiakos Nicosia)
6	DF	POR	João Freitas (from (Portugal) Casa Pia)
13	FW	ANG	Wilson Kenidy (from (Portugal) Casa Pia)
17	DF	CYP	Adamos Efstathiou (free agent)
3	MF	CYP	Stelios Demetriou (from (Sweden) Akropolis IF)
29	FW	CYP	Andreas Pittaras (from ASIL)
22	MF	CYP	Emilios Panayiotou (from Aris Limassol)
—	MF	CYP	Eric Leontiou (from Ethnikos Assia)
15	DF	CYP	Paolo Stylianou (free agent)
34	DF	BRA	Leandro (from Nea Salamina)
19	MF	BRA	Edmar (from AEL Limassol)
1	GK	CYP	Alexandre Negri (from AEK Larnaca)
14	MF	ESP	Aritz López Garai (from (Romania) FC Rapid București)
2	DF	BRA	Paulinho (on loan from Ermis Aradippou)
30	MF	TOG	Henri Eninful (from (Hungary) Kecskeméti TE)
77	MF	CYP	Alex Konstantinou (on loan from APOEL)
23	DF	CYP	Athos Solomou (from (Romania) Oțelul Galați)
26	MF	CIV	Gaossou Fofana (from Omonia)
6	DF	ESP	Manuel Redondo (from (Spain) Real Oviedo)

Out: Note: Flags indicate national team as defined under FIFA eligibility rules; some limited exceptions apply. Players may hold more than one non-FIFA nationality.

No.	Pos.	Nation	Player
20	MF	VEN	Héctor González (to Alki Oroklini)
13	DF	POR	Carlos Marques (to Pafos FC)
77	DF	VEN	Raúl González (to (Poland) Rozwój Katowice)
5	MF	VEN	Elias Romero (to (Venezuela) Deportivo La Guaira)
12	FW	VEN	Christian Novoa (to (Venezuela) Metropolitanos)
23	MF	VEN	Homero Calderón (to (Venezuela) Deportivo Lara)
15	FW	GHA	Albert Ahulu (released)
87	GK	GRE	Giannis Siderakis (to (Greece) AEL Kalloni)
4	DF	ESP	Ferrán Monzó (to (Romania) FC Rapid București)
3	DF	POR	Paulo Jorge (released)
22	FW	CYP	Kyriacos Vasiliou (to PAEEK FC)
9	FW	POR	Diogo Ramos (to (Portugal) Freamunde)
16	DF	CPV	Nilson Antonio (to (Portugal) União Madeira)
18	FW	POR	Bernardo Vasconcelos (to (Portugal) Oriental)
21	DF	ESP	Álvaro Ocaña (to (Spain) Cacereño)
17	MF	CYP	Pantelis Vasiliou (to Ethnikos Latsion)
6	DF	POR	João Freitas (released)
29	FW	CYP	Andreas Pittaras (to Othellos Athienou)
22	MF	CYP	Emilios Panayiotou (released)
93	GK	CYP	Nicolas Anastasiou (to Ethnikos Assia)
32	MF	CYP	Savvas Nicolaou (to Ethnikos Assia)
—	MF	CYP	Eric Leontiou (to Olympiakos Nicosia U21)

=== Enosis Neon Paralimni ===
In: Note: Flags indicate national team as defined under FIFA eligibility rules; some limited exceptions apply. Players may hold more than one non-FIFA nationality.

No.	Pos.	Nation	Player
4	MF	ANG	Edson Silva (from (Angola) Recreativo da Caála)
80	MF	CYP	Dimitris Froxylias (from AEK Larnaca)
77	DF	EGY	Amir Megahed (from (Iraq) Talaba SC)
21	DF	MNE	Mijuško Bojović (from (Belgium) Waasland-Beveren)
1	GK	CYP	Gavriel Constantinou (from Anorthosis Famagusta)
84	FW	GHA	Chris Dickson (from Pafos FC)
10	MF	MNE	Simon Vukčević (from (Greece) Levadiakos)
23	MF	SRB	Milan Svojić (from (Greece) Ermionida)
18	FW	GRE	Vasilis Papadopoulos (on loan from (Greece) PAOK)
9	MF	SRB	Miloš Antić (from (Serbia) OFK Beograd)

Out: Note: Flags indicate national team as defined under FIFA eligibility rules; some limited exceptions apply. Players may hold more than one non-FIFA nationality.

No.	Pos.	Nation	Player
17	MF	CYP	Demos Goumenos (retired)
21	MF	CYP	Giorgos Kolanis (to Anagennisi Dherynia)
9	FW	CYP	Andreas Kyprianou (to Anagennisi Dherynia)
10	FW	CYP	Elias Vattis (to (Greece) Kissamikos)
11	FW	CYP	Marios Zannetou (to (Greece) Apollon Kalamarias)
1	GK	CYP	Christos Mastrou (to Anagennisi Dherynia)
24	FW	CYP	Martinos Solomou (to Anagennisi Dherynia)

=== Ermis Aradippou ===
In: Note: Flags indicate national team as defined under FIFA eligibility rules; some limited exceptions apply. Players may hold more than one non-FIFA nationality.

No.	Pos.	Nation	Player
13	FW	CYP	Nicolas Alexiou (loan return from Alki Oroklini)
—	MF	CIV	Bassalia Ouattara (from (Portugal) Feirense)
90	FW	BFA	Issouf Ouattara (from (Libya) Al-Nasr Benghazi)
—	DF	CYP	Constantinos Demetriou (from Karmiotissa Polemidion)
10	MF	BRA	Charles da Silva (from (Bolivia) Nacional Potosí)
8	MF	ESP	Cristian Portilla (from (Indonesia) Mitra Kukar)
6	MF	GAB	Ulysse Ndong (from Othellos Athienou)
—	DF	ESP	Diego Portilla (from (Spain) Racing de Santander B)
—	FW	HAI	Jean-Eudes Maurice (from Nea Salamina)
—	DF	BRA	Jefferson Faustino (from (Bolivia) The Strongest)
18	MF	URU	Christian Latorre (from (Uruguay) Juventud)
33	GK	CYP	Giorgos Panagi (from Ethnikos Achna)
—	GK	POR	José Moreira (from Omonia)
7	MF	POR	Rúben Brígido (from (Romania) Oțelul Galați)
4	DF	CYP	Panayiotis Frangeskou (from Ethnikos Achna)
88	FW	CYP	Achilleas Vassiliou (from Nea Salamina)
—	DF	CYP	Andreas Themistocleous (from (Latvia) FK Jelgava)
—	DF	GRE	Thanasis Moulopoulos (from (Greece) AEL)
21	FW	CYP	Rafael Yiangoudakis (from Ethnikos Achna)
11	MF	GRE	Andreas Vasilogiannis (from (Greece) Lamia)
—	DF	URU	Alejandro Rodríguez (from (Uruguay) Rampla Juniors)
23	FW	COD	Yannick Yenga (from (Greece) Lamia)
19	FW	GUI	Alhassane Keita (from (Belgium) Lierse)
14	MF	CYP	Leandros Lillis (from AEL Limassol)
5	DF	ESP	Fran González (from (Spain) Hércules)
12	GK	GRE	Leonidas Panagopoulos (from (Romania) Universitatea Cluj)
55	DF	CYP	Demetris Moulazimis (on loan from Omonia)
91	MF	RSA	Sérgio Marakis (from (Portugal) Marítimo)
9	DF	NED	Cendrino Misidjan (from (Netherlands) Emmen)
25	FW	COD	Jessy Mayele (from (Algeria) USM Bel-Abbès)
29	FW	NGR	Femi Balogun (from (Portugal) Olhanense)
27	MF	LBR	Theo Weeks (from (Portugal) Marítimo)

Out: Note: Flags indicate national team as defined under FIFA eligibility rules; some limited exceptions apply. Players may hold more than one non-FIFA nationality.

No.	Pos.	Nation	Player
19	MF	ESP	Luis Morán (to (Greece) Olympiacos Volos)
75	MF	GLP	Matthieu Bemba (to Nea Salamina)
11	FW	NGR	Ifeanyi Onyilo (loan return to (Serbia) Red Star Belgrade)
1	GK	MKD	Martin Bogatinov (to Ethnikos Achna)
27	FW	MKD	Besart Ibraimi (to (North Macedonia) Shkendija)
16	FW	CYP	Georgios Tofas (to Achironas Liopetriou)
21	FW	CZE	Jan Rezek (to (Czech Republic) FK Příbram)
35	DF	POR	Toni Lopes (released)
81	MF	POR	Manú (released)
3	DF	SRB	Dragan Žarković (to Nea Salamina)
17	MF	GRE	Giannis Taralidis (to (Greece) Kissamikos)
29	FW	CYP	Andreas Papathanasiou (to AEZ Zakakiou)
22	DF	BRA	Paulinho (on loan to Doxa Katokopia)
13	FW	CYP	Nicolas Alexiou (on loan to Elpida Xylofagou)
—	DF	BRA	Jefferson Faustino (released)
—	MF	CIV	Bassalia Ouattara (to (Portugal) Lusitano FCV)
—	DF	CYP	Constantinos Demetriou (to Karmiotissa Polemidion)
—	DF	CYP	Andreas Themistocleous (released)
—	FW	HAI	Jean-Eudes Maurice (released)
—	DF	URU	Alejandro Rodríguez (released)
—	DF	ESP	Diego Portilla (to PAEEK FC)
14	FW	CYP	Giorgos Katsiatis (on loan to Ayia Napa)
—	DF	GRE	Thanasis Moulopoulos (to (Greece) Levadiakos)
—	GK	POR	José Moreira (to (Portugal) Olhanense)
91	MF	BRA	Bruno Turco (to (Paraguay) Nacional Asunción)
20	DF	POR	China (to Nea Salamina)
8	MF	ESP	Cristian Portilla (to (Hungary) FC Tatabanya)
10	MF	BRA	Charles da Silva (released)
88	FW	CYP	Achilleas Vassiliou (to PAEEK FC)
32	DF	CYP	Constantinos Samaras (on loan to Olympiakos Nicosia)

=== Ethnikos Achna ===
In: Note: Flags indicate national team as defined under FIFA eligibility rules; some limited exceptions apply. Players may hold more than one non-FIFA nationality.

No.	Pos.	Nation	Player
42	MF	ALB	Krasniqi Kreshnic (loan return from ENTHOI Lakatamia)
23	GK	CYP	Zannetos Mytidis (from AEK Larnaca)
8	MF	CYP	Marios Poutziouris (from Othellos Athienou)
—	DF	ITA	Andrea Scozzese (from (Malta) Sliema Wanderers)
—	FW	GEO	Nikoloz Sabanadze (from (Georgia (country)) Torpedo Kutaisi)
6	MF	BRA	Bruno Arrabal (from (Brazil) Tupi)
12	MF	ROU	Alexandru Coman (from (Romania) Petrolul Ploiești)
41	DF	BRA	Samuel Araújo (free agent)
88	MF	GEO	Beka Tugushi (from (Georgia (country)) Torpedo Kutaisi)
14	MF	BEL	Emmerik De Vriese (from (Bulgaria) Lokomotiv Plovdiv)
22	GK	MKD	Martin Bogatinov (from Ermis Aradippou)
4	DF	ROU	Alexandru Iacob (from (Romania) Rapid București)
11	MF	ROU	Sebastian Cojocnean (from (Italy) Monza 1912)
40	DF	CYP	Charis Kyriakou (from Omonia)
7	MF	ESP	Carles Coto (from (Italy) San Marino)
21	MF	GEO	Shota Grigalashvili (from Nea Salamina)
9	FW	COL	Jhon Obregón (from (Bahrain) Riffa)
83	GK	MSR	Corrin Brooks-Meade (from Nea Salamina)

Out: Note: Flags indicate national team as defined under FIFA eligibility rules; some limited exceptions apply. Players may hold more than one non-FIFA nationality.

No.	Pos.	Nation	Player
64	GK	FRA	Mathieu Valverde (loan return to Anorthosis Famagusta)
33	GK	CYP	Giorgos Loizou (to Aris Limassol)
8	FW	BRA	Ibson de Melo (to Ayia Napa)
2	DF	FRA	Mamadou Wague (to (Saudi Arabia) Najran)
88	MF	SUI	Fabian Stoller (to (Switzerland) Aarau)
22	MF	ESP	Joaquín García (released)
18	DF	GRE	Anestis Argyriou (released)
11	MF	BRA	Juninho (to (Greece) Panegialios)
12	GK	CYP	Giorgos Panagi (to Ermis Aradippou)
4	DF	CYP	Panayiotis Frangeskou (to Ermis Aradippou)
6	DF	SEN	Gora Tall (released)
9	FW	BRA	Valdo (to (Thailand) Air Force Central)
26	DF	CYP	Christoforos Christofi (to Nea Salamina)
7	FW	CYP	Rafael Yiangoudakis (to Ermis Aradippou)
16	FW	HAI	Kervens Belfort (to (Turkey) 1461 Trabzon)
—	DF	ITA	Andrea Scozzese (released)
—	FW	GEO	Nikoloz Sabanadze (to (Georgia (country)) Saburtalo)

=== Nea Salamina ===
In: Note: Flags indicate national team as defined under FIFA eligibility rules; some limited exceptions apply. Players may hold more than one non-FIFA nationality.

No.	Pos.	Nation	Player
29	FW	CYP	Angelos Siatha (loan return from Ayia Napa)
14	FW	CYP	Timotheos Pavlou (loan return from Digenis Oroklinis)
69	DF	BUL	Giorgos Velkov (loan return from ASIL Lysi)
21	DF	CYP	Fotis Kezos (free agent)
8	MF	CRO	Ivan Ćurjurić (from Ayia Napa)
6	MF	GLP	Matthieu Bemba (from Ermis Aradippou)
14	FW	CYP	Alkiviadis Christofi (from Karmiotissa Polemidion)
27	MF	CYP	Evgenios Kyriacou (from Karmiotissa Polemidion)
26	DF	CYP	Christoforos Christofi (from Ethnikos Achna)
5	DF	CYP	Andreas Vassiliou (from Othellos Athienou)
77	DF	CYP	Panayiotis Panayiotou (from Othellos Athienou)
20	MF	GRE	Giannis Skopelitis (from AEK Larnaca)
11	MF	CYP	Kyriacos Pavlou (from AEK Larnaca)
93	GK	CYP	Neofytos Michael (from ENTHOI Lakatamia)
1	GK	LAT	Pāvels Šteinbors (from (Poland) Górnik Zabrze)
10	FW	PAR	Aldo Adorno (free agent)
9	FW	BUL	Dimitar Makriev (from (Hungary) Pécsi MFC)
95	MF	FRA	Arnaud Honoré (from (France) Amiens SC)
18	MF	BUL	Veselin Marchev (from Ayia Napa)
19	FW	CYP	Marcos Michael (from Aris Limassol)
4	DF	ESP	José Picón (from (Spain) UB Conquense)
2	DF	SRB	Marko Andić (from Anorthosis Famagusta)
23	MF	ESP	Simón Colina (from (Scotland) Partick Thistle)
4	DF	SRB	Dragan Žarković (from Ermis Aradippou)
82	DF	POR	China (from Ermis Aradippou)

Out: Note: Flags indicate national team as defined under FIFA eligibility rules; some limited exceptions apply. Players may hold more than one non-FIFA nationality.

No.	Pos.	Nation	Player
35	DF	CYP	Panayiotis Loizides (loan return to Anorthosis Famagusta)
94	FW	HAI	Jean-Eudes Maurice (to Ermis Aradippou)
11	FW	NGR	Eze Vincent Okeuhie (to Omonia)
8	FW	CYP	Achilleas Vassiliou (to Ermis Aradippou)
34	DF	BRA	Leandro (to Doxa Katokopias)
30	MF	GEO	Shota Grigalashvili (to Ethnikos Achna)
55	MF	GEO	Giorgi Papava (to (Georgia (country)) Dila Gori)
32	MF	CYP	Antonis Katsis (to Ayia Napa)
9	FW	POR	Henrique (to (Portugal) Vilaverdense)
1	GK	ISR	Ram Strauss (to (Israel) Hapoel Tel Aviv)
83	GK	MSR	Corrin Brooks-Meade (to Ethnikos Achna)
10	MF	ESP	Diego León (to (Greece) Olympiacos Volos)
3	DF	BRA	Marco Aurélio (to Aris Limassol)
5	DF	BRA	Éder Monteiro (to (India) Chennaiyin)
21	MF	GRE	Giorgos Lambropoulos (to Ayia Napa)
38	MF	BRA	Gleison (released)
77	DF	CYP	Panayiotis Panayiotou (to PAEEK FC)
14	FW	CYP	Alkiviadis Christofi (to Karmiotissa Polemidion)
27	MF	CYP	Evgenios Kyriacou (to Karmiotissa Polemidion)
4	DF	ESP	José Picón (to (Spain) Leioa)
29	GK	CYP	Ellinas Sofroniou (to Nikos & Sokratis Erimis)
14	FW	CYP	Timotheos Pavlou (on loan to Othellos Athienou)
11	FW	CYP	Giorgos Siathas (on loan to Omonia Aradippou)
—	MF	CYP	Angelos Siathas (on loan to Omonia Aradippou)
5	DF	CYP	Andreas Vassiliou (on loan to Othellos Athienou)

=== Omonia ===
In: Note: Flags indicate national team as defined under FIFA eligibility rules; some limited exceptions apply. Players may hold more than one non-FIFA nationality.

No.	Pos.	Nation	Player
—	MF	CYP	Andreas Frangeskou (loan return from PAEEK FC)
96	MF	CYP	Panayiotis Therapontos (loan return from Olympiakos Nicosia)
49	MF	CYP	Fanos Katelaris (loan return from Olympiakos Nicosia)
17	DF	FRA	Anthony Scaramozzino (loan return from (Greece) Panetolikos)
13	FW	NGR	Eze Vincent Okeuhie (from Nea Salamina)
76	DF	SEN	Jackson Mendy (from (Bulgaria) Litex Lovech)
9	FW	IRL	Cilian Sheridan (from APOEL)
6	DF	URU	Matías Pérez (from (Uruguay) Juventud)
31	GK	ROU	Laurențiu Brănescu (on loan from (Italy) Juventus)
10	MF	BRA	Luciano Bebê (from AEL Limassol)
39	FW	BEL	Ziguy Badibanga (from (Greece) Asteras Tripolis)
24	DF	GRE	Anastasios Kantoutsis (from (Greece) Atromitos)
77	FW	CYP	Demetris Christofi (from (Switzerland) FC Sion)
53	DF	POR	Hélder Cabral (from (Portugal) Vitória Setúbal)
45	DF	EGY	Karim Hafez (on loan from (Belgium) Lierse)
5	MF	CIV	Romaric (from (France) SC Bastia)

Out: Note: Flags indicate national team as defined under FIFA eligibility rules; some limited exceptions apply. Players may hold more than one non-FIFA nationality.

No.	Pos.	Nation	Player
31	GK	POR	José Moreira (to Ermis Aradippou)
44	MF	HUN	Leandro (to (Hungary) Ferencvárosi TC)
6	MF	ESP	Rodri (to (Spain) Burgos CF)
40	DF	CYP	Charis Kyriakou (to Ethnikos Achna)
22	FW	ESP	Álex Rubio (to (Spain) CD Alcoyano)
9	FW	ESP	Roberto García (to (Spain) CD Toledo)
17	DF	FRA	Anthony Scaramozzino (to (France) RC Lens)
39	FW	BEN	Mickaël Poté (to (Turkey) Adana Demirspor)
96	MF	CYP	Panayiotis Therapontos (on loan to PAEEK FC)
18	DF	CYP	Christoforos Charalambous (to Omonia Aradippou)
4	DF	CYP	Demetris Moulazimis (on loan to Ermis Aradippou)
36	MF	CYP	Jack Sammoutis (to (England) Walton Casuals)
26	MF	CIV	Gaossou Fofana (to Doxa Katokopias)
32	MF	CYP	Constantinos Louvaris (on loan to Olympiakos Nicosia)
15	DF	CYP	Pantelis Konomis (on loan to Omonia Aradippou)
—	MF	CYP	Andreas Frangeskou (on loan to PAEEK FC)

=== Pafos FC ===
In: Note: Flags indicate national team as defined under FIFA eligibility rules; some limited exceptions apply. Players may hold more than one non-FIFA nationality.

No.	Pos.	Nation	Player
89	GK	GEO	Roin Kvaskhvadze (from Othellos Athienou)
88	MF	GEO	Levan Khmaladze (from Othellos Athienou)
16	FW	NED	Nassir Maachi (from (Malta) Birkirkara)
13	DF	POR	Carlos Marques (from Doxa Katokopias)
3	MF	CIV	Joël Damahou (from (France) Tours FC)
99	FW	TOG	Hugues Ayivi (from (France) Poiré-sur-Vie)
1	GK	LAT	Jānis Krūmiņš (from Akritas Chlorakas)
9	FW	GEO	Nikoloz Gelashvili (from (Albania) KS Flamurtari)
90	GK	CYP	Andreas Vassiliou (from (England) Luton Town)
23	MF	CMR	Hervé Bodiong (on loan from (France) Tours FC)
2	DF	NGR	Rasheed Alabi (from (Portugal) Leixões)
31	FW	NGR	Emmanuel Okoye (from (Nigeria) FC Ansfed United)
30	MF	GEO	Elguja Grigalashvili (from Othellos Athienou)
5	DF	GEO	Gia Grigalava (from (Russia) Anzhi Makhachkala)

Out: Note: Flags indicate national team as defined under FIFA eligibility rules; some limited exceptions apply. Players may hold more than one non-FIFA nationality.

No.	Pos.	Nation	Player
1	GK	CYP	Demetris Leoni (to ENY Digenis Ypsona)
25	DF	CYP	Panayiotis Ioannou (to AEZ Zakakiou)
19	MF	CYP	Alexandros Garpozis (to AEZ Zakakiou)
9	FW	CYP	Stamatis Pantos (to Karmiotissa Polemidion)
23	MF	CYP	Charis Andreou (to AEZ Zakakiou)
77	MF	CYP	Demetris Philippou (to Akritas Chlorakas)
16	MF	CYP	Polys Philippou (to Akritas Chlorakas)
84	FW	GHA	Chris Dickson (to Enosis Neon Paralimni)
30	GK	HUN	Zsolt Sebők (to (Hungary) Gyirmót)
21	MF	POR	Wesllem (to Anagennisi Dherynia)
11	MF	RWA	Lewis Aniweta (to ENAD Polis Chrysochous)
22	DF	CYP	Charalambos Charalambous (to Mandria)
4	DF	CYP	Pantelis Pitsillos (to Othellos Athienou)
4	DF	CYP	Ioannis Savva (on loan to Karmiotissa Polemidion)

== Cypriot Second Division ==
=== AEZ Zakakiou ===
In: Note: Flags indicate national team as defined under FIFA eligibility rules; some limited exceptions apply. Players may hold more than one non-FIFA nationality.

No.	Pos.	Nation	Player
12	MF	CYP	Michalis Polydorou (from Digenis Oroklinis)
10	MF	CYP	Alexandros Garpozis (from Pafos FC)
18	MF	CYP	Elias Christodoulou (from Nikos & Sokratis Erimis)
—	FW	CYP	Savvas Michael (from AEL Limassol U21)
—	MF	CYP	Nicolas Aristokli (from Aris Limassol U21)
—	MF	CYP	Christos Makris (from Ethnikos Latsion)
—	FW	CYP	Christos Makris (from Akritas Chlorakas)
—	MF	CYP	Charis Andreou (from Pafos FC)
30	MF	CYP	Simos Krassas (from Aris Limassol)
—	MF	CYP	Christos Andrellis (from AEL Limassol U21)
4	DF	CYP	Theodoros Kaneti (from APEP)
9	FW	CYP	Andreas Papathanasiou (from Ermis Aradippou)
—	FW	CYP	Marinos Polykarpou (from Nea Salamina U21)
33	FW	CYP	Andreas Christou (from Enosis Neon Parekklisia)
24	MF	CYP	Jason Kotsapa (from Enosis Neon Parekklisia U21)
50	DF	CYP	Constantinos Alexandrou (from Aris Limassol)
7	MF	CYP	Christos Nicolaou (from Enosis Neon Parekklisia)
25	DF	CYP	Panayiotis Ioannou (from Pafos FC)
—	FW	CYP	Rafael Mammides (from Nikos & Sokratis Erimis U21)
8	MF	GRE	Vasilis Emmanouil (from (Greece) Tyrnavos 2005)
99	FW	CYP	Andreas Demetriou (from ENY Digenis Ypsona)
23	DF	BUL	Yanko Georgiev (free agent)
26	GK	GRE	Stelios Tentonis (from (Greece) Ethnikos Neou Agioneriou)
6	MF	CYP	Sergios Panayiotou (from Aris Limassol)

Out: Note: Flags indicate national team as defined under FIFA eligibility rules; some limited exceptions apply. Players may hold more than one non-FIFA nationality.

No.	Pos.	Nation	Player
99	FW	CYP	Minas Antoniou (loan return to AEL Limassol)
17	MF	CYP	Kyriacos Panagi (loan return to Apollon Limassol)
6	MF	CYP	Sergios Panayiotou (loan return to Aris Limassol)
21	MF	CYP	Christos Emmanouil (to (Greece) Ethnikos Serron)
77	FW	CYP	Savvas Kyprou (to Karmiotissa Polemidion)
4	MF	CYP	Andreas Theofanous (to Omonia Aradippou)
88	DF	CYP	Andreas Fotiou (to Karmiotissa Polemidion)
10	MF	CYP	Neophytos Hadjispyrou (to Karmiotissa Polemidion)
26	GK	CYP	Venizelos Sygkrasitis (to Karmiotissa Polemidion)
14	MF	CYP	Pavlos Pafitis (to Peyia FC 2014)
8	MF	CYP	Ioannis Demetriou (to Nikos & Sokratis Erimis)
55	FW	SLE	Ishmael Danjaji (to Ethnikos Latsion)
44	DF	CYP	Marios Christou (to ENY Digenis Ypsona)
54	FW	CYP	Demetris Kardanas (to APEP)
3	DF	CYP	Antonis Eleftheriou (to Amathus Agiou Tychona)
—	MF	CYP	Christos Makris (to Ethnikos Latsion)
—	FW	CYP	Christos Makris (to Akritas Chlorakas)

=== Anagennisi Dherynia ===
In: Note: Flags indicate national team as defined under FIFA eligibility rules; some limited exceptions apply. Players may hold more than one non-FIFA nationality.

No.	Pos.	Nation	Player
11	FW	CYP	Martinos Solomou (from Enosis Neon Paralimni)
1	GK	CYP	Christos Mastrou (from Enosis Neon Paralimni)
21	MF	POR	Wesllem (from Pafos FC)
9	FW	CYP	Andreas Kyprianou (from Enosis Neon Paralimni)
17	MF	GHA	Samad Oppong (from (Ghana) Asante Kotoko SC)
8	MF	SEN	Issaga Diallo (from (England) Cambridge United)
14	MF	GRE	Nikolaos Vlasopoulos (from (Greece) Fostiras)
89	MF	CYP	Ioannis Kasiakkis (from (Greece) Agios Georgios Neas Krinis)
80	MF	CYP	Georgios Koutouna (from Frenaros FC)
34	MF	CYP	Georgios Kolanis (from Enosis Neon Paralimni)

Out: Note: Flags indicate national team as defined under FIFA eligibility rules; some limited exceptions apply. Players may hold more than one non-FIFA nationality.

No.	Pos.	Nation	Player
11	FW	HUN	Lajos Terjék (to Achyronas Liopetri)
19	MF	CYP	Giorgos Nicolaou (to AEZ Zakakiou)
6	MF	CYP	Christos Modestou (to Karmiotissa Polemidion)
20	DF	CYP	Anastasios Efstathiou (to Elpida Xylofagou)
27	MF	TUN	Mohamed Sassi (to (France) FC Mantes)
37	FW	FRA	Kevin Zolana (to APEP)
1	GK	POR	Jorge Vieira (to Karmiotissa Polemidion)

=== ASIL ===
In: Note: Flags indicate national team as defined under FIFA eligibility rules; some limited exceptions apply. Players may hold more than one non-FIFA nationality.

No.	Pos.	Nation	Player
7	FW	CIV	Félicien Gbedinyessi (from (France) Fleury Mérogis 91)
20	MF	CYP	Luka Mihajlović (from Anorthosis Famagusta U21)
77	FW	GBS	Adul Seidi (from (Portugal) Leiria)
11	FW	CYP	Kyriacos Christou (from Achyronas Liopetri)
3	DF	CYP	Vasilis Papageorgiou (from PAEEK FC)
22	MF	CYP	Stavros Christoudias (from Chalkanoras Idaliou)
82	MF	CYP	Constantinos Sofocleous (from Ethnikos Latsion)
21	MF	CYP	Paraskevas Choutris (on loan from AEK Larnaca F.C.)
97	GK	CYP	Andreas Georgiou (from AEK Larnaca U21)
27	DF	CYP	Ioannis Poullis (from Anorthosis Famagusta U21)
10	DF	ALG	Hicham Chirouf (from (France) FC Saint-Louis Neuweg)
19	MF	CYP	Antonis Vassileiou (from AEK Larnaca U21)
2	DF	ARG	Daniel Blanco (from (Argentina) Juventud Alianza)
31	GK	CYP	Andreas Kitsis (from Omonia Aradippou)

Out: Note: Flags indicate national team as defined under FIFA eligibility rules; some limited exceptions apply. Players may hold more than one non-FIFA nationality.

No.	Pos.	Nation	Player
69	DF	BUL	Giorgos Velkov (loan return to Nea Salamina)
7	MF	CYP	Adamos Chatzigeorgiou (loan return to Anorthosis Famagusta)
39	FW	CYP	Andreas Pittaras (to Doxa Katokopias)
19	FW	CYP	Andreas Anastasiou (to PO Xylotymbou)
18	GK	BUL	Dejan Minev (to Ormidia)
70	DF	CYP	Spyros Savva (to Ormidia)

=== Digenis Voroklinis ===
In: Note: Flags indicate national team as defined under FIFA eligibility rules; some limited exceptions apply. Players may hold more than one non-FIFA nationality.

No.	Pos.	Nation	Player
30	GK	CYP	Andreas Photiou (from Omonia Aradippou)
1	GK	CYP	Pavlos Pitsillides (from Chalkanoras Idaliou)
6	MF	CYP	Nicolas Loizou (from Ermis Aradippou U21)
5	DF	ENG	Frederick James Westlake (from Anorthosis Famagusta U21)
10	MF	POR	Belarmino Tavares (from (Portugal) Vitória Sernache)
7	FW	ENG	Sam Malsom (from Nikos & Sokratis Erimis)
9	MF	SEN	Ibrahim Diallo (from (Switzerland) FC Meyrin)
3	DF	GRE	Nicolas Loungos (from PAEEK FC)
21	MF	CYP	Demetris Fylaktou (from Digenis Morphou)
15	FW	STP	Valter Rocha (from (Portugal) Atletico Reguengos)
87	MF	GHA	Jerome Agbo (free agent)
4	DF	POL	Daniel Pawlak (from (Poland) Drwęca Nowe Miasto Lubawskie)

Out: Note: Flags indicate national team as defined under FIFA eligibility rules; some limited exceptions apply. Players may hold more than one non-FIFA nationality.

No.	Pos.	Nation	Player
9	FW	CYP	Timotheos Pavlou (loan return to Nea Salamina)
6	MF	CYP	Andreas Orfanou (to Alki Oroklini)
25	MF	CYP	Michalis Polydorou (to AEZ Zakakiou)
21	FW	CYP	Panayiotis Pallourtis (to Elpida Xylofagou)
13	GK	GRE	Ioannis Petopoulos (to Ormidia)
16	GK	CYP	Charalambos Markou (to Elpida Xylofagou)
37	MF	GBS	Pedro Tavares (to Achyronas Liopetri)
12	MF	CYP	Andreas Parpas (to Chalkanoras Idaliou)

=== Elpida Xylofagou ===
In: Note: Flags indicate national team as defined under FIFA eligibility rules; some limited exceptions apply. Players may hold more than one non-FIFA nationality.

No.	Pos.	Nation	Player
10	FW	CYP	Panayiotis Pallourtis (from Digenis Oroklinis)
44	GK	CYP	Michalis Hadjigiannis (from Frenaros FC)
14	DF	CYP	Andreas Demetriou (from Leivadiakos Salamina Leivadion)
9	FW	CYP	Demos Demosthenous (from Ormidia)
88	FW	CYP	Nicolas Alexiou (on loan from Ermis Aradippou)
23	MF	CYP	Stavros Zevlaris (from Ormidia)
21	DF	CYP	Anastasios Efstathiou (from Anagennisi Dherynia)
1	GK	CYP	Charalambos Markou (from Digenis Oroklinis)
6	MF	MDA	Roman Bolbocian (from (Greece) Fokikos)
12	DF	GRE	Giannis Sentementes (from (Greece) Pierikos)
88	GK	GRE	Argyris Roppas (from (Greece) Mandraikos)

Out: Note: Flags indicate national team as defined under FIFA eligibility rules; some limited exceptions apply. Players may hold more than one non-FIFA nationality.

No.	Pos.	Nation	Player
40	GK	ALB	Aldo Teqja (loan return to Anorthosis Famagusta)
4	DF	CYP	Alexis Theocharous (to Alki Oroklini)
21	DF	ANG	João Comboio (to Omonia Aradippou)
19	MF	CYP	Manolis Manoli (to Omonia Aradippou)
9	FW	CYP	Sergis Avraam (to Alki Oroklini)

=== ENAD Polis Chrysochous FC ===
In: Note: Flags indicate national team as defined under FIFA eligibility rules; some limited exceptions apply. Players may hold more than one non-FIFA nationality.

No.	Pos.	Nation	Player
12	GK	POR	José Eduardo (from Foinikas Agias Marinas Chrysochous)
27	DF	POR	Hugo Coelho (free agent)
6	MF	NED	Coplan Soumaoro (from (Netherlands) HSC'21)
94	FW	NED	Osman Kabba (from (Netherlands) Zwolle U21)
9	FW	GRE	Lazaros Mantziris (from (Greece) Makedonikos)
11	MF	GRE	Stavros Vatamidis (from (Greece) Agrotikos Asteras U21)
1	MF	RWA	Lewis Aniweta (from Pafos FC)
15	FW	NGR	Chidi Onyemah (from (Portugal) Famalicão)
55	DF	CYP	Andreas Papanastasiou (from Ethnikos Assia)
99	FW	CYP	Sofoklis Georgiou (from Ethnikos Latsion)

Out: Note: Flags indicate national team as defined under FIFA eligibility rules; some limited exceptions apply. Players may hold more than one non-FIFA nationality.

No.	Pos.	Nation	Player
22	DF	CYP	Christos Palates (to Akritas Chlorakas)
7	DF	CYP	Socratis Socratous (to Akritas Chlorakas)
9	FW	NGR	David Opara (to Karmiotissa Polemidion)
1	GK	CYP	Theodosis Iosif (to Akritas Chlorakas)
99	FW	ISR	Omri Ron (released)
40	MF	CYP	Anthimos Georgiou (to Akritas Chlorakas)

=== Enosis Neon Parekklisia ===
In: Note: Flags indicate national team as defined under FIFA eligibility rules; some limited exceptions apply. Players may hold more than one non-FIFA nationality.

No.	Pos.	Nation	Player
9	FW	CYP	Giorgos Neophytou (from APEP)
6	FW	CYP	Michalis Sykas (from Aris Limassol)
99	DF	RUS	Elvis Kryukov (from Omonia Aradippou)
19	GK	CYP	Andreas Erakleous (from Karmiotissa Polemidion)
81	DF	CYP	Loizos Kakoyiannis (from Karmiotissa Polemidion)
23	DF	GEO	Levan Maghradze (from Karmiotissa Polemidion)
2	DF	CYP	Stefanos Matsiouka (from Amathus Agiou Tychona)
8	DF	CYP	Chrysis Antoniou (from Apollon Limassol)
5	DF	CYP	Renos Christodoulou (on loan from Apollon Limassol)
12	MF	CYP	Stelios Tampouris (on loan from Apollon Limassol)

Out: Note: Flags indicate national team as defined under FIFA eligibility rules; some limited exceptions apply. Players may hold more than one non-FIFA nationality.

No.	Pos.	Nation	Player
12	FW	GER	Marios Grüny (to ENY Digenis Ypsona)
8	MF	CYP	Christos Nikolaou (to AEZ Zakakiou)
9	FW	CYP	Nicolas Theodorou (to Omonia Aradippou)
2	FW	CYP	Nicos Kanetis (to Olympiakos Nicosia)
33	FW	CYP	Andreas Christou (to AEZ Zakakiou)
6	MF	CYP	Varnavas Xioufarides (to ENY Digenis Ypsona)
5	DF	CYP	Nicos Sofokleous (to Kouris Erimis)
1	GK	CYP	Michalis Kokkinos (to APEP)
29	MF	NGR	Henry Ikwuazom (released)

=== ENTHOI Lakatamia ===
In: Note: Flags indicate national team as defined under FIFA eligibility rules; some limited exceptions apply. Players may hold more than one non-FIFA nationality.

No.	Pos.	Nation	Player
5	DF	CYP	Chrysovalantis Panayiotou (from Ethnikos Assia)
11	MF	GRE	Christos Chatzipantelidis (free agent)
6	DF	CYP	Sotiris Finiris (from Nikos & Sokratis Erimis)
24	MF	CYP	Andreas Kallis (from Chalkanoras Idaliou)
4	DF	CYP	Pierakis Kastanas (from Omonia Aradippou)
61	GK	CYP	Kyriacos Panayiotou (from (Russia) SKA-Energiya)
17	MF	CYP	Marios Laifis (from Omonia Aradippou)
26	MF	CYP	Giorgos Constantinides (from Nikos & Sokratis Erimis)
9	FW	BRA	Fernando Henrique (free agent)
27	MF	CYP	Charis Mouzouros (from (England) Torquay United)

Out: Note: Flags indicate national team as defined under FIFA eligibility rules; some limited exceptions apply. Players may hold more than one non-FIFA nationality.

No.	Pos.	Nation	Player
42	MF	ALB	Krasniqi Kreshnic (loan return to Ethnikos Achna)
27	MF	CYP	Evgenios Antoniou (to Olympiakos Nicosia)
61	GK	CYP	Neofytos Michael (to Nea Salamina)
6	MF	CYP	Constantinos Constantinou (to MEAP Nisou)
11	MF	CYP	Panos Demetriou (to Chalkanoras Idaliou)
5	MF	CYP	Vlasis Stylianou (to ENY Digenis Ypsona)

=== Karmiotissa Polemidion ===
In: Note: Flags indicate national team as defined under FIFA eligibility rules; some limited exceptions apply. Players may hold more than one non-FIFA nationality.

No.	Pos.	Nation	Player
29	FW	CYP	Stamatis Pantos (from Pafos FC)
12	FW	NGR	David Opara (from ENAD Polis Chrysochous)
7	FW	CYP	Savvas Kyprou (from AEZ Zakakiou)
6	MF	CYP	Christos Modestou (from Anagennisi Dherynia)
27	DF	CYP	Andreas Fotiou (from AEZ Zakakiou)
11	FW	ENG	Jordan Palmer-Samuels (from Nikos & Sokratis Erimis)
75	DF	COD	Alain Logombe (from (France) US Lunéville)
26	GK	CYP	Venizelos Sygkrasitis (from AEZ Zakakiou)
—	DF	CYP	Demos Sokratous (from Amathus Agiou Tychona)
—	DF	CYP	Panayiotis Foklas (from Nikos & Sokratis Erimis)
16	MF	CYP	Neophytos Hadjispyrou (from AEZ Zakakiou)
77	FW	NED	Leonard (from Nikos & Sokratis Erimis)
17	DF	CYP	Constantinos Demetriou (from Ermis Aradippou)
21	MF	GRE	Nikos Soulidis (from (Greece) Apollon Kalamarias)
14	FW	CYP	Alkiviadis Christofi (from Nea Salamina)
4	MF	CYP	Evgenios Kyriacou (from Nea Salamina)
1	GK	POR	Jorge Vieira (from Anagennisi Dherynia)
—	DF	CYP	Ioannis Savva (on loan from Pafos FC)

Out: Note: Flags indicate national team as defined under FIFA eligibility rules; some limited exceptions apply. Players may hold more than one non-FIFA nationality.

No.	Pos.	Nation	Player
24	MF	ROU	Marian Neagu (loan return to (Romania) Concordia Chiajna)
11	FW	CYP	Nicolas Panayides (to ENY Digenis Ypsona)
22	GK	CYP	Andreas Erakleous (to Enosis Neon Parekklisia)
17	DF	CYP	Constantinos Demetriou (to Ermis Aradippou)
34	GK	BUL	Abdi Abdikov (to (Bulgaria) Septemvri Simitli)
81	DF	CYP	Loizos Kakoyiannis (to Enosis Neon Parekklisia)
33	MF	CYP	Andreas Zenonos (to ENY Digenis Ypsona)
16	DF	GEO	Levan Maghradze (to Enosis Neon Parekklisia)
5	DF	CYP	Andreas Karamanis (to Akritas Chlorakas)
37	FW	ZIM	Edward Mashinya (to Olympiakos Nicosia)
7	FW	CYP	Alkiviadis Christofi (to Nea Salamina)
27	MF	CYP	Evgenios Kyriacou (to Nea Salamina)
23	DF	RUS	Elvis Kryukov (to Omonia Aradippou)
30	MF	CYP	Yiannis Pachipis (to Olympiakos Nicosia)
—	DF	CYP	Demos Sokratous (to APEP)
—	DF	CYP	Panayiotis Foklas (to APEP)

=== Nikos & Sokratis Erimis ===
In: Note: Flags indicate national team as defined under FIFA eligibility rules; some limited exceptions apply. Players may hold more than one non-FIFA nationality.

No.	Pos.	Nation	Player
17	DF	CYP	Andreas Niokka (from Aris Limassol)
8	MF	CYP	Ioannis Demetriou (from AEZ Zakakiou)
7	FW	HUN	Alexander Ferenc (from (Germany) Rot-Weiß Erfurt U19)
12	MF	GRE	Spartakos Kotanidis (from Peyia FC 2014)
19	MF	CYP	Angelos Mavrakis (free agent)
4	FW	CYP	Grigoris Hadjivassilis (from Chalkanoras Idaliou)
16	FW	CYP	Rafael Kourtellos (from APEP)
2	DF	COD	Vinny Mayélé (from (Belgium) SW Harelbeke)
1	GK	CYP	Ellinas Sofroniou (from Nea Salamina)
20	FW	CYP	Christoforos Stylianou (from APEP)
3	DF	CYP	Marios Kyriacou (from APEP)
21	MF	CYP	Paris Panayiotou (from AEL Limassol U21)
22	MF	CYP	Constantinos Hadjittofis (from Aris Limassol)
6	MF	CYP	Marios Christou (from Aris Limassol U21)
11	FW	MKD	Roberto Stojkov (from (Switzerland) FC Dietikon)
10	MF	ENG	Josh Shama (free agent)
—	FW	CYP	Giorgos Gekas (free agent)

Out: Note: Flags indicate national team as defined under FIFA eligibility rules; some limited exceptions apply. Players may hold more than one non-FIFA nationality.

No.	Pos.	Nation	Player
16	MF	CYP	Elias Christodoulou (to AEZ Zakakiou)
17	MF	CYP	Giorgos Constantinides (to ENTHOI Lakatamia)
11	FW	ENG	Sam Malsom (to Digenis Oroklinis)
95	GK	POL	Marcin Marcinkowski (to Othellos Athienou)
9	FW	ENG	Jordan Palmer-Samuels (to Karmiotissa Polemidion)
55	DF	CYP	Panayiotis Foklas (to Karmiotissa Polemidion)
26	FW	NED	Leonard (to Karmiotissa Polemidion)
99	DF	FRA	Alexis Aubou (to APEP)
37	DF	NED	Alain Baank (to (Netherlands) Dordrecht U21)
91	MF	POL	Pawel Herman (to (Poland) Bug Wyszków)
5	DF	CYP	Periklis Moustakas (released)
50	DF	CYP	Sotiris Finiris (to ENTHOI Lakatamia)
7	DF	POR	Rúben Freitas (released)
36	GK	CZE	Matej Stencek (released)
94	DF	BUL	Daniel Τsvetkov (released)
93	MF	NGR	John Oyekunle (released)
23	MF	NGR	Emmanuel Adewole (released)

=== Olympiakos Nicosia ===
In: Note: Flags indicate national team as defined under FIFA eligibility rules; some limited exceptions apply. Players may hold more than one non-FIFA nationality.

No.	Pos.	Nation	Player
9	FW	CYP	Giorgos Loizou (from Othellos Athienou)
7	DF	CYP	Nicos Kanetis (from Enosis Neon Parekklisia)
10	MF	CYP	Yiannis Pachipis (from Karmiotissa Polemidion)
37	FW	ZIM	Edward Mashinya (from Karmiotissa Polemidion)
23	GK	ESP	Salva (from (England) Oxford City)
25	DF	CYP	Andreas Christofides (from APOEL)
13	MF	CYP	Yiannis Serafeim (from Ethnikos Assia)
17	DF	ESP	Regino (free agent)
22	DF	ESP	Pablo Suárez (from (Spain) Castellón)
91	GK	GRE	Lefteris Chatziadamides (from (Greece) PAOK U21])
70	FW	UKR	Vitalii Doroshenko (from (Portugal) União Nogueirense)
20	FW	ESP	Mario Martos (from (Spain) Real Jaén)
32	MF	CYP	Constantinos Louvaris (on loan from Omonia)
5	DF	ESP	David Álvarez (from (Spain) Córdoba B)
27	MF	CYP	Evgenios Antoniou (from ENTHOI Lakatamia)
1	GK	CYP	Giorgos Kakoullis (from PAEEK FC)
64	DF	GRE	Kyriakos Aretas (from APOEL U21)
84	DF	CYP	Constantinos Samaras (on loan from Ermis Aradippou)

Out: Note: Flags indicate national team as defined under FIFA eligibility rules; some limited exceptions apply. Players may hold more than one non-FIFA nationality.

No.	Pos.	Nation	Player
7	MF	CYP	Panayiotis Therapontos (loan return to Omonia)
8	MF	CYP	Fanos Katelaris (loan return to Omonia)
16	GK	CYP	Nicolas Anastasiou (loan return to Doxa Katokopias)
17	MF	ALG	Amine Meftah (released)
25	GK	SVK	Milan Vincler (released)
99	FW	GRE	Paris Andriopoulos (released)
29	FW	CYP	Kyriacos Peros (to MEAP Nisou)
10	MF	CYP	Fanos Evangelou (to Othellos Athienou)
9	FW	CYP	Yiannis Mavrou (to AEL Limassol)
5	DF	CYP	Stefanos Mouktaris (to (Greece) Kallithea)
26	MF	CYP	Demetris Christofi (to Othellos Athienou)
3	FW	CYP	Giorgos Karkotis (on loan to Chalkanoras Idaliou)

=== Omonia Aradippou ===
In: Note: Flags indicate national team as defined under FIFA eligibility rules; some limited exceptions apply. Players may hold more than one non-FIFA nationality.

No.	Pos.	Nation	Player
21	DF	ANG	João Comboio (from Elpida Xylofagou)
19	MF	CYP	Manolis Manoli (from Elpida Xylofagou)
17	DF	CYP	Antonis Koudellis (from Ayia Napa)
8	MF	ESP	Hector Micó (from (Spain) Alzira)
—	DF	CYP	Charis Drakos (free agent)
4	DF	GRE	Angelos Eleftheriadis (from (Germany) VfR Neumunster)
6	MF	CYP	Andreas Theofanous (from AEZ Zakakiou)
—	DF	RUS	Elvis Kryukov (from Karmiotissa Polemidion)
27	DF	CYP	Petros Messios (from Ayia Napa)
9	FW	ARG	Kevin Levis (from (Spain) PD Santa Eulalia)
16	MF	CPV	Cuca Fernandes (from (Portugal) 1º Dezembro)
23	GK	CYP	Simos Tsiakkas (from Aris Limassol)
22	GK	BUL	Emil Mihaylov (from (Bulgaria) Marek Dupnitsa)
10	FW	CYP	Nicolas Theodorou (from Enosis Neon Parekklisia)
5	DF	CYP	Michalis Pericleous (from ENY Digenis Ypsona)
3	DF	CYP	Christoforos Charalambous (from Omonia)
2	DF	CYP	Pantelis Konomis (on loan from Omonia)
11	FW	CYP	Giorgos Siathas (on loan from Nea Salamina)
7	MF	CYP	Angelos Siathas (on loan from Nea Salamina)
—	MF	CYP	Adamos Andreou (on loan from Anorthosis)

Out: Note: Flags indicate national team as defined under FIFA eligibility rules; some limited exceptions apply. Players may hold more than one non-FIFA nationality.

No.	Pos.	Nation	Player
8	MF	CYP	Christodoulos Kountourettis (to Alki Oroklini)
22	GK	CYP	Andreas Photiou (to Digenis Oroklinis)
4	DF	CYP	Pierakis Kastanas (to ENTHOI Lakatamia)
77	MF	CYP	Marios Laifis (to ENTHOI Lakatamia)
2	DF	CYP	Orthodoxos Ioannou (released)
99	GK	ESP	Angel Diez (to (Spain) SD Leioa)
58	FW	ESP	Adolfo Ortiz (released)
56	FW	ESP	Chabi (released)
9	FW	NED	Rangelo Janga (to (Netherlands) Dordrecht)
10	MF	GRE	Panayiotis Linardos (to (Greece) Panegialios)
7	FW	CYP	Andreas Alcibiades (to Othellos Athienou)
—	DF	RUS	Elvis Kryukov (to Enosis Neon Parekklisia)
23	GK	CYP	Andreas Kitsis (to ASIL Lysi)

=== Othellos Athienou ===
In: Note: Flags indicate national team as defined under FIFA eligibility rules; some limited exceptions apply. Players may hold more than one non-FIFA nationality.

No.	Pos.	Nation	Player
13	MF	CYP	Fanos Evangelou (from Olympiakos Nicosia)
89	DF	CYP	Pantelis Pitsillos (from Pafos FC)
7	FW	CYP	Andreas Alcibiades (from Omonia Aradippou)
24	MF	ARG	Nicolás de Bruno (from (Italy) A.S. Sora)
14	FW	CYP	Michalis Koumouris (from Chalkanoras Idaliou)
10	FW	BRA	Cicero Bobbio (from (Brazil) Bangu)
20	DF	ARG	Santiago Petrovich (from (Argentina) Independiente de Neuquén)
9	FW	CYP	Andreas Pittaras (from Doxa Katokopias)
94	MF	MAR	Yoann Tribeau (from (France) Créteil-Lusitanos)
29	MF	ROU	Călin Cristea (free agent)
30	DF	ROU	Gabriel Frîncu (from (Romania) Unirea Tărlungeni)
92	DF	FRA	Johan Letzelter (from (India) Mumbai City)
8	MF	GHA	Livingstone Adjin (free agent)
26	MF	CYP	Demetris Christofi (from Olympiakos Nicosia)
11	FW	CYP	Timotheos Pavlou (on loan from Nea Salamina)
95	GK	POL	Marcin Marcinkowski (from Nikos & Sokratis Erimis)
4	DF	CYP	Andreas Vassiliou (on loan from Nea Salamina)

Out: Note: Flags indicate national team as defined under FIFA eligibility rules; some limited exceptions apply. Players may hold more than one non-FIFA nationality.

No.	Pos.	Nation	Player
24	MF	GAB	Ulysse Ndong (to Ermis Aradippou)
89	GK	GEO	Roin Kvaskhvadze (to Pafos FC)
8	MF	GEO	Levan Khmaladze (to Pafos FC)
7	FW	CYP	Vassilis Chatzigiannakou (to AEK Larnaca)
38	MF	CYP	Marios Poutziouris (to Ethnikos Achna)
6	DF	CYP	Andreas Vassiliou (to Nea Salamina)
77	DF	CYP	Panayiotis Panayiotou (to Nea Salamina)
30	MF	GEO	Elguja Grigalashvili (to Pafos FC)
39	MF	ESP	Jonan García (released)
2	DF	NED	Serginho Greene (to (India) Delhi Dynamos)
83	DF	NED	Civard Sprockel (to (England) Notts County)
18	FW	ARG	Jesús Vera (to (Argentina) Club Cipolletti)
9	FW	TUN	Ismail Sassi (to (France) FC Mantes)
4	DF	ESP	Alain Álvarez (to (Spain) Racing de Santander)
32	FW	CYP	Evangelos Kyriacou (to Aris Limassol)
19	FW	CYP	Giorgos Loizou (to Olympiakos Nicosia)
70	FW	BRA	Thiago Ferreira (to (Belgium) Lierse S.K.)

=== PAEEK ===
In: Note: Flags indicate national team as defined under FIFA eligibility rules; some limited exceptions apply. Players may hold more than one non-FIFA nationality.

No.	Pos.	Nation	Player
24	DF	CYP	Stelios Mina (from Ethnikos Assia)
19	FW	CYP	Kyriacos Vasiliou (from Doxa Katokopias)
91	GK	CYP	Giorgos Papadopoulos (from APEP)
44	MF	CYP	Andreas Frangeskou (on loan from Omonia)
17	MF	CYP	Panayiotis Therapontos (on loan from Omonia)
—	MF	CYP	Panayiotis Prountzou (from Ethnikos Latsion)
23	DF	CYP	Leonidas Achilleos (from Ethnikos Latsion)
5	DF	ESP	Diego Portilla (from Ermis Aradippou)
21	MF	GRE	Panagiotis Giannopoulos (from (Greece) Pierikos)
4	DF	CYP	Christoforos Gavriil (from (Greece) Alimos)
11	FW	NGR	Boris Odwong (from APEP)
77	DF	CYP	Panayiotis Panayiotou (from Nea Salamina)
8	FW	CYP	Achilleas Vassiliou (from Ermis Aradippou)

Out: Note: Flags indicate national team as defined under FIFA eligibility rules; some limited exceptions apply. Players may hold more than one non-FIFA nationality.

No.	Pos.	Nation	Player
11	MF	CYP	Pantelis Vasiliou (loan return to Doxa Katokopias)
19	FW	CYP	Kyriacos Vasiliou (loan return to Doxa Katokopias)
4	MF	CYP	Andreas Frangeskou (loan return to Omonia)
5	DF	GRE	Nicolas Loungos (to Digenis Oroklinis)
3	DF	CYP	Vasilis Papageorgiou (to ASIL Lysi)
1	GK	CYP	Giorgos Kakoullis (to Olympiakos Nicosia)
9	FW	CYP	Sotiris Vourkou (to Ethnikos Assia)
12	DF	CYP	Constantinos Pantziaris (to Ethnikos Assia)
17	MF	CYP	Marios Theodorou (to Iraklis Gerolakkou)
77	MF	CYP	Savvas Savva (to Digenis Morphou)
