= 2016–17 Campeonato Nacional Feminino =

Campeonato Nacional de Futebol Feminino
- Season: 2016–17
- Matches: 134
- Goals: 631 (4.71 per match)
- Top goalscorer: Solange Carvalhas (14 goals)

The 2016–17 Campeonato Nacional de Futebol Feminino, also known as Liga Futebol Feminino Allianz for sponsorship reasons, is the 32nd edition of the top division of the Portugal women's football championship. It started on 10 September 2016 and ended on 28 May 2017.

== Teams ==
Location of the 14 teams in the 2016-17 Campeonato Nacional

Team	Location	Stadium	Capacity
GDC A-dos-Francos	Caldas da Raínha	Campo Luís Duarte	200
Clube de Albergaria Mazel	Albergaria-a-Velha	Estádio Municipal António Matins Pereira	1,000
CF Os Belenenses	Lisbon	Estádio do Restelo	19,856
CF Benfica	Lisbon	Estádio Francisco Lázaro	1,500
Boavista FC	Porto	Estádio do Bessa Século XXI	28,263
Braga	Braga	Estádio Municipal de Braga	30.286
GD Estoril Praia	Estoril	Estádio Municipal do Farvão	
União Ferreirense	Anadia	Complexo Desportivo da Junta de Freguesia da Moita	
Atlético Ouriense	Ourém	Campo da Caridade	260
CAC Pontinha	Odivelas	Complexo Desportivo Carlos Lourenço	
Sporting CP	Lisbon	Estádio José Alvalade	50,095
Valadares Gaia FC	Valadares	Complexo Desportivo de Valadares	750
Vilaverdense FC	Vila Verde	Estádio Municipal de Vila Verde	5,000
Viseu 2001 ADSC	Viseu	Campo 1º de Maio	700

== League table ==
Pos	Team	Pld	W	D	L	GF	GA	GD	Pts	Qualification or relegation
1	Sporting CP	26	24	2	0	123	10	+113	74	Qualification for UEFA Champions League
2	SC Braga	26	23	2	1	150	4	+146	71	
3	CF Benfica	26	19	2	5	118	25	+93	59	
4	Valadares Gaia FC	26	16	5	5	74	18	+56	53	
5	Boavista FC	26	12	3	11	67	48	+19	39	
6	Clube de Albergaria	26	11	6	9	51	39	+12	39	
7	GD Estoril Praia	26	12	2	12	55	51	+4	38	
8	Vilaverdense FC	26	12	1	13	62	68	−6	37	
9	GDC A-dos-Francos	26	11	2	13	57	68	−11	35	
10	União Ferreirense	26	8	3	15	35	70	−35	27	
11	Atlético Ouriense	26	8	1	17	27	80	−53	25	Relegation to Campeonato de Promoção
12	Viseu 2001 ADSC	26	6	2	18	31	79	−48	20	Relegation to Campeonato de Promoção
13	CF Os Belenenses	26	4	1	21	15	102	−87	13	Relegation to Campeonato de Promoção
14	CAC Pontinha	26	0	0	26	6	208	−202	0	Relegation to Campeonato de Promoção

Updated to match(es) played on 20 May 2017. Source: FPF
Rules for classification: 1) points; 2) head-to-head points; 3) goal difference; 4) number of goals scored

== Results ==
Home \ Away	ADF	ALB	BEL	BEN	BOA	BRA	EST	FER	OUR	PON	SPO	VAL	VIL	VIS
GDC A-dos-Francos		2–5	3–0	1–6	1–3	0–6	0–2	2–2	1–0	10–1	1–6	2–3	2–3	2–0
Clube de Albergaria	0–2		2–0	2–2	3–1	0–3	0–1	1–1	1–2	3–0	3–3	0–0	1–4	2–0
CF Os Belenenses	1–2	0–2		0–9	0–5	0–8	0–0	1–2	0–1	5–1	0–5	0–2	0–3	1–0
CF Benfica	7–0	0–0	8–0		3–1	0–1	2–0	7–1	9–0	15–0	2–3	1–2	4–1	5–0
Boavista FC	2–4	3–1	3–2	1–4		0–2	2–2	1–2	2–0	14–1	1–6	0–4	0–1	3–1
SC Braga	5–0	3–0	12–0	7–0	3–0		3–0	9–0	9–0	13–0	0–0	0–0	8–0	8–0
GD Estoril Praia	2–3	2–3	8–1	0–3	0–3	1–6		2–0	5–0	9–0	0–7	1–3	3–2	5–1
União Ferreirense	3–3	0–2	4–0	0–4	0–4	0–4	1–0		2–0	4–0	1–4	0–4	2–4	2–0
Atlético Ouriense	4–3	0–3	0–1	1–2	1–1	0–7	1–2	1–0		6–0	0–4	1–3	0–3	3–2
CAC Pontinha	0–7	0–10	0–1	0–7	0–7	0–13	2–4	0–5	1–3		0–10	0–9	0–15	0–3
Sporting CP	3–1	8–0	6–0	2–1	1–0	1–0	3–1	5–0	8–0	10–0		1–0	8–0	9–0
Valadares Gaia FC	3–0	1–0	5–0	0–1	3–3	1–2	0–1	6–1	6–0	8–0	0–1		5–1	1–1
Vilaverdense FC	0–2	0–6	5–2	1–5	1–2	1–7	4–2	3–0	0–1	5–0	0–4	1–1		1–2
Viseu 2001 ADSC	1–3	1–1	1–0	1–4	2–5	0–6	1–2	3–2	5–2	5–0	0–5	0–4	1–3	

Updated to match(es) played on 20 May 2017. Source: Soccerway.com
Legend: Blue = home team win; Yellow = draw; Red = away team win.

== Season statistics ==
=== Top scorers ===
As of Week 19

Rank	Player	Club	Goals
1	Solange Carvalhas	Sporting CP	29
2	Joana Vieira	CF Benfica	19
3	Catarina Machado	Vilaverdense FC	19
4	Adriana Gomes	SC Braga	18
5	Mafalda Marujo	CF Benfica	16
6	Catarina Amado	Estoril Praia	14
6	Ana Capeta	Sporting CP	14
6	Otilia Livia	SC Braga	14
9	"Clo" García	SC Braga	13
9	Daniela Alves "Pipa"	Estoril Praia	13

=== Best goalkeepers ===
As of Week 10

Rank	Player	Club	Goals against	Minutes	Coeff.
1	Rute Costa	SC Braga	1	540	1:540
2	Jamila Martins	CF Benfica	4	540	1:135
3	Patrícia Morais	Sporting CP	4	450	1:112.5
4	Sara Oliveira	Clube de Albergaria	5	540	1:108
5	Neide Simões	Valadares Gaia FC	6	540	1:90

=== Hat-tricks ===
As of Week 10

Player	For	Against	Result	Round
"Clo" García	SC Braga	União Ferreirense	9–0 (h)	1
Daniela Alves "Pipa"^{4}	Estoril Praia	Os Belenenses	8–1 (h)	2
Solange Carvalhas	Sporting CP	Viseu 2001	9–0 (h)	2
Daniela Alves "Pipa"^{4}	Estoril Praia	Atlético Ouriense	5–0 (h)	3
Adriana Gomes^{8}	Boavista FC	CAC Pontinha	14-1 (h)	4
Joana Vieira^{5}	CF Benfica	CAC Pontinha	0-14 (a)	5
Solange Carvalhas^{5}	Sporting CP	CAC Pontinha	10–0 (h)	6
Ana Capeta^{4}	Sporting CP	CAC Pontinha	10–0 (h)	6

^{4} Player scored 4 goals
^{5} Player scored 5 goals
^{8} Player scored 8 goals
