= S.U. 1º Dezembro (women) =

Football club in Portugal

- Full name: Sociedade União 1° de Dezembro
- Nicknames: Guerreiras de Sintra (Sintra Warriors); Vermelho-e-Brancos (Red and White)
- Founded: 1995; 31 years ago
- Ground: Campo Conde de Sucena
- Capacity: 1,000
- Chairman: (Portugal) Fernando Cunha
- Manager: (Portugal) José Simões
- League: Campeonato Nacional
- Website: http://www.su1dezembro.com
Home colours	Away colours

Sociedade União 1º Dezembro is a women's football club based in Sintra, Portugal. The football section of S.U. 1º Dezembro was founded in 1995. The women's football team played in the top national league, the Campeonato Nacional de Futebol Feminino and were the dominant force during the 2000s.

After the first league title in 1999–2000, the team won every league title from the 2001–02 season until 2011–12. The team had won 7 Portuguese Cups since the creation of the competition in 2003–2004, making it the most successful women's football team in Portugal. However, at the end of 2013–2014, the women's football team ended due to economic issues.

== History ==
The women's football section of the Sociedade União 1º de Dezembro was created in 1995, making the club one of the few in Portugal to have both a men's and a women's football team. Ever since the creation of the section, the team have won 12 league titles – 11 of which in a row – and 7 Portuguese Cups making it the most successful women's football team in Portugal.

The section also managed an U-18 women's football team which disputed the Campeonato de Promoção de Futebol Feminino, the name of the women's football second division.

After a 3rd place in the 2012-13 league, the women's football section was incorporated into Sevenfoot, a non-profit association managing the youth football teams of the club. This restructuring involved several players of the main team leaving the club, changing the manager and making the U-18 team into a 7-a-side team to challenge for the new Lisbon U-18 Regional League.

== Titles ==
Main Team

- Portuguese Women's Champion

Winners (12) (record): 1999-2000, 2001-02, 2002-03, 2003-04, 2004-05, 2005-06, 2006-07, 2007-08, 2008-09, 2009-10, 2010-11, 2011-2012

- Portuguese Women's Cup

Winners (7) (record): 2003-04, 2005-06, 2006-07, 2007-08, 2009-10, 2010-11, 2011-12

U-18 Team

- Second Division Cup

Winner (1): 2012-13

=== Record in UEFA competitions ===
Season	Competition	Stage	Result	Opponent	Scorers
2002–03	Women's Cup	Preliminary stage	2–1; 2–0; 0–3	(Austria) Innsbrucker (Scotland) Kilmarnock (Russia) CSK VVS Samara	Fernandes 2 Couto, Fernandes
2003–04	Women's Cup	Preliminary stage	0–4; 2–5; 0–1	(Germany) Frankfurt (Spain) Athletic Bilbao (Austria) Neulengbach	Brunheira, Couto
2004–05	Women's Cup	Preliminary stage	1–3; 1–1; 0–1	(Austria) Neulengbach (Republic of Ireland) UCD (France) Montpellier	Brancão; Couto
2005–06	Women's Cup	Preliminary stage	3–0; 7–0; 0–1	(Wales) Cardiff City (Northern Ireland) Glentoran (France) Montpellier	Fernandes, Oliveira, Pinto; Carneiro 2, Pinto 2, Fernandes, Martins, Oliveira
2006–07	Women's Cup	Preliminary stage	0–4; 7–1; 0–3	(Iceland) Breiðablik (Northern Ireland) Newtownabbey Strikers (Austria) Neulengbach	Pinto 5, Fernandes 2
2007–08	Women's Cup	Preliminary stage	7–0; 2–0; 0–1	(Croatia) Osijek (Wales) Cardiff City (Belgium) Rapide Wezemaal	Fernandes 2, Brunheira, Caleja, Couto, Lourido, Pinto; Caleja, Couto
2008–09	Women's Cup	Preliminary stage	7–1; 1–1; 0–4	(Cyprus) Vamos Idaliou (Slovenia) Krka Novo Mesto (Austria) SV Neulengbach	Couto 4, Gouveia, Pinto, D. Silva; Carvalhas
2009–10	Champions League	Preliminary stage	10–0; 3–0; 0–1	(Malta) Birkirkara (Wales) Cardiff City (Denmark) Brøndby	Fernandes 2, D. Silva 2, Couto, Galvão, Matias, Pinto, A. Silva + 1 o.g.
2010–11	Champions League	Preliminary stage	1–4; 4–1; 1–4	(Republic of Ireland) St. Francis (Croatia) Osijek (Russia) Rossiyanka	Cristina; Cristina 2, Matos, Mendes; Cristina
2011–12	Champions League	Preliminary stage	1–1; 4–0; 1–4	(Israel) ASA Tel Aviv (Latvia) Liepājas Metalurgs (Hungary) MTK Hungaria	Carvalhas; Alves, Caleja, Couto, Matos
2012–13	Champions League	Preliminary stage	4–0; 1–0; 1–4	(Northern Ireland) Glentoran (Malta) Birkirkara (Romania) Olimpia Cluj	Fontes, Galvão, A. Silva, Ventura; A. Silva; A. Silva

== Final squad ==
As of 3 November 2013

Note: Flags indicate national team as defined under FIFA eligibility rules; some limited exceptions apply. Players may hold more than one non-FIFA nationality.

No.	Pos.	Nation	Player
1	GK	POR	Inês Andrada
2	DF	POR	Sara Ribeiro
3	DF	POR	Susana Alves
5	DF	POR	Ana Bernardes
7	MF	POR	Mariana Pina
8	MF	POR	Iolanda Silva
9	MF	POR	Madalena Fontes
10	MF	POR	Paula Cristina
13	DF	POR	Jéssica Chaveiro
15	FW	POR	Sara Martins

No.	Pos.	Nation	Player
17	FW	POR	Raquel Oliveira
18	DF	POR	Margarida Sousa
19	MF	POR	Beatriz Fernandes
20	MF	POR	Mariana Fontes
21	MF	POR	Jéssica Simão
22	DF	POR	Rute Gonçalves
23	FW	POR	Catarina Carvalho
26	FW	POR	Carina Afonso
28	DF	POR	Ana Rita Gonçalves
