= S.U. 1º Dezembro =

Portuguese association football club

- Full name: Sociedade União 1°Dezembro
- Nicknames: Guerreiros de Sintra (Sintra Warriors); Vermelho-e-Brancos (Red and White)
- Short name: 1º Dezembro
- Founded: 1 December 1880; 145 years ago
- Ground: Campo Conde de Sucena
- Capacity: 1,000
- President: (Portugal) José Francisco Gomes
- Manager: (Portugal) Rui Maside
- League: Campeonato de Portugal
- 2023–24: Liga 3 Serie B, 10th (First stage); Serie 2, 4th (Relegation Stage)
- Website: www.1dezembro.com
Home colours	Away colours

Sociedade União 1º Dezembro is a sports club from Sintra, Portugal. The football section of the club was founded on 6 April 1938, and the women's football section in 1995. The men's football team plays in the Liga 3. The women's football team played in the national top league, the Campeonato Nacional and dominated till the 2010s. After the first championship title in 1999–2000, the team won every season from the 2001–02 season onwards for eleven championships in a row. With their twelfth title in 2012 they are Portugal's record champion. At the end of 2013–2014, the women's football team ended due to economic issues.

In the UEFA Women's Cup they did not go past the 1st qualification round. In the 2009–10 and 2010–11 Women's Champions League they competed in the qualifying round.

== Current squad ==
As of 24 March, 2026

Note: Flags indicate national team as defined under FIFA eligibility rules; some limited exceptions apply. Players may hold more than one non-FIFA nationality.

No.	Pos.	Nation	Player
1	GK	CPV	Fábio Duarte
2	DF	POR	Pedro Ramos
5	MF	POR	Alex Sousa
7	MF	POR	Diogo Ferreira
8	MF	POR	Vitó
9	FW	POR	Carlos Ferreira
11	FW	POR	Isabelinha
13	DF	POR	Jorge Bernardo
14	FW	COL	Juan Nazarit
17	FW	NGR	Adewale Sapara
20	FW	STP	Harramiz
22	MF	CPV	Ulisses Tavares
23	DF	POR	Lisandro Menezes
24	DF	POR	Eduardo Borges
26	DF	POR	João Freitas

No.	Pos.	Nation	Player
27	FW	SEN	Pape Führer
31	DF	POR	Pedro Gaio
33	DF	GBS	Lassana Mané
42	MF	POR	Leandro Tavares
44	DF	POR	Caiser Gomes
47	GK	POR	João Oliveira (on loan from Vitória Guimarães)
50	FW	FRA	Mahamadou Diawara
77	FW	STP	Sérgio Malé
81	MF	POR	Diogo Maria
85	DF	POR	Kamika
88	MF	POR	Miguel Abreu
96	FW	COL	Jordy Arroyo
99	GK	POR	Rodrigo Anjos

== Titles ==
- Campeonato Nacional de Futebol Feminino
  - Champions (12): 2000, 2002 to 2012
- Portuguese Women's Cup
  - Winners (7): 2004, 2006 to 2008, 2010 to 2012

== European record ==
=== Performance in UEFA competitions ===
Season	Competition	Stage	Result	Opponent	Scorers
2002–03	Women's Cup	Preliminary stage	2–1; 2–0; 0–3	(Austria) Innsbrucker (Scotland) Kilmarnock (Russia) CSK VVS Samara	Fernandes 2 Couto, Fernandes
2003–04	Women's Cup	Preliminary stage	0–4; 2–5; 0–1	(Germany) Frankfurt (Spain) Athletic Bilbao (Austria) Neulengbach	Brunheira, Couto
2004–05	Women's Cup	Preliminary stage	1–3; 1–1; 0–1	(Austria) Neulengbach (Republic of Ireland) UCD (France) Montpellier	Brancão; Couto
2005–06	Women's Cup	Preliminary stage	3–0; 7–0; 0–1	(Wales) Cardiff City (Northern Ireland) Glentoran (France) Montpellier	Fernandes, Oliveira, Pinto; Carneiro 2, Pinto 2, Fernandes, Martins, Oliveira
2006–07	Women's Cup	Preliminary stage	0–4; 7–1; 0–3	(Iceland) Breiðablik (Northern Ireland) Newtownabbey Strikers (Austria) Neulengbach	Pinto 5, Fernandes 2
2007–08	Women's Cup	Preliminary stage	7–0; 2–0; 0–1	(Croatia) Osijek (Wales) Cardiff City (Belgium) Rapide Wezemaal	Fernandes 2, Brunheira, Caleja, Couto, Lourido, Pinto; Caleja, Couto
2008–09	Women's Cup	Preliminary stage	7–1; 1–1; 0–4	(Cyprus) Vamos Idaliou (Slovenia) Krka Novo Mesto (Austria) SV Neulengbach	Couto 4, Gouveia, Pinto, D. Silva; Carvalhas
2009–10	Champions League	Preliminary stage	10–0; 3–0; 0–1	(Malta) Birkirkara (Wales) Cardiff City (Denmark) Brøndby	Fernandes 2, D. Silva 2, Couto, Galvão, Matias, Pinto, A. Silva + 1 o.g.
2010–11	Champions League	Preliminary stage	1–4; 4–1; 1–4	(Republic of Ireland) St. Francis (Croatia) Osijek (Russia) Rossiyanka	Cristina; Cristina 2, Matos, Mendes; Cristina
2011–12	Champions League	Preliminary stage	1–1; 4–0; 1–4	(Israel) ASA Tel Aviv (Latvia) Liepājas Metalurgs (Hungary) MTK Hungaria	Carvalhas; Alves, Caleja, Couto, Matos
2012–13	Champions League	Preliminary stage	4–0; 1–0; 1–4	(Northern Ireland) Glentoran (Malta) Birkirkara (Romania) Olimpia Cluj	Fontes, Galvão, A. Silva, Ventura; A. Silva; A. Silva
