= Yang Seong-hwan =

South Korean footballer (born 1994)

Personal information
- Date of birth: 9 September 1994 (age 32)
- Place of birth: South Korea
- Height: 1.77 m (5 ft 10 in)
- Position: Right-back

Youth career
- –2016: University of Ulsan
- 2018–2019: Vitória

Senior career*
Years	Team	Apps	(Gls)
2017	Gangwon	0	(0)
2018	1º de Dezembro	7	(0)
2019–2020	Académico de Viseu	5	(0)
2021	Seoul Nowon United	23	(1)
- * Club domestic league appearances and goals as of 18:20, 7 February 2022 (UTC)

- Yang Seong-hwan
- Hangul: 양성환
- RR: Yang Seonghwan
- MR: Yang Sŏnghwan

Yang Seong-hwan (Korean: 양성환; born 9 September 1994) is a South Korean footballer plays as a right-back.

== Career statistics ==
=== Club ===
As of 17 November 2019.

Club	Season	League			National Cup		League Cup		Continental		Other		Total	
Club	Season	Division	Apps	Goals	Apps	Goals	Apps	Goals	Apps	Goals	Apps	Goals	Apps	Goals
Gangwon	2017	K League Classic	0	0	0	0	–		–		0	0	0	0
1º de Dezembro	2017–18	Campeonato de Portugal	7	0	0	0	0	0	–		0	0	7	0
Académico de Viseu	2019–20	LigaPro	1	0	0	0	0	0	–		0	0	1	0
Career total			8	0	0	0	0	0	0	0	0	0	8	0
