= 2011 Algarve Cup =

International women's football tournament

Tournament details
- Host country: Portugal
- Dates: 2–9 March 2011
- Teams: 12 (from 4 confederations)
- Venues: 9 (in 9 host cities)

Final positions
- Champions: United States (8th title)
- Runners-up: Iceland
- Third place: Japan
- Fourth place: Sweden

Tournament statistics
- Matches played: 24
- Goals scored: 62 (2.58 per match)
- Top scorer(s): (United States) Alex Morgan (United States) Carli Lloyd (Portugal) Carla Couto (Portugal) Edite Fernandes (Wales) Jessica Fishlock (Iceland) Margrét Lára Viðarsdóttir (3 goals)
- Best player: (Japan) Homare Sawa

The 2011 Algarve Cup was the eighteenth edition of the Algarve Cup, an invitational women's football tournament held annually in Portugal. It took place between 2–9 March 2011.

== Format ==
The twelve invited teams were split into three groups that played a round-robin tournament.

Groups A and B, containing the strongest ranked teams, were the only ones in contention to win the title. The group winners from A and B contested the final, with the runners-up playing for third place and those that finished third in these two groups playing for fifth place.

The teams in Group C were playing for places 7–12, with the winner of Group C playing the team that finished fourth in Group A or B with the better record for seventh place and the Group C runner-up playing the team which came last in Group A or B with the worse record for ninth place. The third and fourth-placed teams in Group C played for eleventh place.

Points awarded in the group stage follow the standard formula of three points for a win, one point for a draw and zero points for a loss. In the case of two teams being tied on the same number of points in a group, their head-to-head result determined the higher place.

== Teams ==
Listed are the confirmed teams.

Team	FIFA Rankings (November 2010)
United States	1
Sweden	4
Japan	5
Norway	7
China	13
Denmark	14
Finland	16
Iceland	17
Romania	37
Portugal (hosts)	39
Chile	46
Wales	47

== Group stage ==
All times local (WET/UTC+0)

=== Group A ===
Team	Pts	Pld	W	D	L	GF	GA	GD
United States	9	3	3	0	0	8	1	+7
Japan	6	3	2	0	1	7	2	+5
Norway	3	3	1	0	2	2	4	−2
Finland	0	3	0	0	3	1	11	−10

2 March 2011
18:00

Norway	2–1	Finland
Thorsnes 29'; Herlovsen 39'		Kalmari 28'

Municipal Stadium, Lagos

2 March 2011
15:00

United States	2–1	Japan
Rodriguez 6'; Rapinoe 17'	Report	Miyama 28'

Municipal Stadium, Vila Real de Santo António

4 March 2011
15:00

Japan	5–0	Finland
Ohno 16'; Kawasumi 18'; Nagasato 47'; Yamaguchi 70', 86'

Municipal Stadium, Lagos

4 March 2011
15:00

United States	2–0	Norway
Tarpley 33'; Lloyd 63'	Report

Municipal Stadium, Vila Real de Santo António

7 March 2011
15:00

Norway	0–1	Japan
		Nagasato 58'

Complexo Desportivo Belavista, Parchal

7 March 2011
15:00

United States	4–0	Finland
Boxx 8'; Lloyd 13'; Morgan 45', 55'	Report

Municipal Stadium, Quarteira

=== Group B ===
Team	Pts	Pld	W	D	L	GF	GA	GD
Iceland	9	3	3	0	0	5	2	+3
Sweden	6	3	2	0	1	5	3	+2
Denmark	3	3	1	0	2	2	4	−2
China	0	3	0	0	3	1	4	−3

2 March 2011
15:00

Sweden	1–2	Iceland
Öqvist		Margrét Lára; Katrín Jónsdóttir

Municipal Stadium, Loulé

2 March 2011
15:00

China	0–1	Denmark
		Nielsen 1'

Desportivo da Nora Park, Ferreiras

4 March 2011
15:00

Iceland	2–1	China
Margrét Lára 27', 50'		Ma 21'

Municipal Stadium, Albufeira

4 March 2011
15:00

Denmark	1–3	Sweden
Pedersen 10'		Landström 8', 60'; Öqvist 54'

José Arcanjo Stadium, Olhão

7 March 2011
15:00

China	0–1	Sweden
		Schelin 62'

José Arcanjo Stadium, Olhão

7 March 2011
15:00

Denmark	0–1	Iceland
		Dóra María 55'

Municipal Stadium, Lagos

=== Group C ===
Team	Pts	Pld	W	D	L	GF	GA	GD
Wales	6	3	2	0	1	5	5	0
Portugal	5	3	1	2	0	4	2	+2
Romania	4	3	1	1	1	4	3	+1
Chile	1	3	0	1	2	1	4	−3

2 March 2011
18:00

Portugal	3–1	Wales
Couto 11', 61'; Fernandes 18'		Dykes 42'

Municipal Stadium, Vila Real de Santo António

2 March 2011
15:00

Romania	2–0	Chile
Dusa 34', 55'

Municipal Stadium, Lagos

4 March 2011
18:00

Portugal	0–0	Chile

Municipal Stadium, Vila Real de Santo António

4 March 2011
18:00

Wales	2–1	Romania
Fishlock 60'; Lander 72'		Dusa 40'

Municipal Stadium, Lagos

7 March 2011
18:00

Chile	1–2	Wales
Zamora		Fishlock 24', 60'

Estádio Algarve, Faro

7 March 2011
18:00

Portugal	1–1	Romania
Fernandes 41'		Vătafu 85'

Complexo Desportivo Belavista, Parchal

== Placement play-offs ==
All times local (WET/UTC+0)

=== 11th Place ===
9 March 2011
10:30

Romania	1 – 1 (5 – 6 PSO)	Chile
Lunca 87'		Rocío Soto 68'

Complexo Desportivo Belavista, Parchal

=== 9th Place ===
9 March 2011
11:00

Finland	1–2	Portugal
Sainio 74'		Fernandes 29'; Couto 77'

Municipal Stadium, Loulé

=== 7th Place ===
9 March 2011
11:00

China	2–1	Wales
You Jia 3'; Gu Yasha 54'		Harries 57'

Municipal Stadium, Albufeira

=== 5th Place ===
9 March 2011
11:00

Norway	0 – 0 (5 – 4 PSO)	Denmark

Desportivo da Nora Park, Ferreiras

=== 3rd Place ===
9 March 2011
13:30

Sweden	1–2	Japan
Sjögran 14'		Kamionobe 22'; Kawasumi 32'

Complexo Desportivo Belavista, Parchal

== Final ==
9 March 2011
17:00

Iceland	2–4	United States
Ómarsdóttir 26'; Hallbera 28'	Report	Lloyd 10'; Cheney 45+1'; O'Reilly 55'; Morgan 87'

Estádio Algarve, Faro

2011 Algarve Cup

United States
Eighth title

== Top Goal Scorers ==
3 goals

- (United States) Alex Morgan
- (United States) Carli Lloyd
- (Portugal) Carla Couto
- (Portugal) Edite Fernandes
- (Wales) Jessica Fishlock
- (Iceland) Margrét Lára Viðarsdóttir

== Most Valuable Player ==
- (Japan) Homare Sawa

== Fair Play ==
- Chile
