= Campo Conde de Sucena =

Football stadium in Sintra, Portugal

- Interactive map of Campo Conde de Sucena
- Location: Sintra, Portugal
- Coordinates: 38°47′17″N 09°22′29″W
- Owner: S.U. 1º Dezembro
- Capacity: 1,000
- Surface: Artificial turf
- Field size: 100 x 64 m

Construction
- Opened: 1935

Tenants
- S.U. 1º Dezembro; Abrunheira-URCA

The Campo Conde de Sucena is a multi-use stadium in Sintra, Portugal. It is used primarily for football matches. The stadium is able to hold 1,000 people and is the home of the S.U. 1º Dezembro club.

== History ==
After the board of the S.U. 1º Dezembro decided to expand its sports activities to include football, the then Count of Sucena granted the club some land in 1935. It has been located in that piece of land ever since it being granted and all the club's activities are performed there on a daily basis.

The stadium is located at the base of the Sintra Mountains, making for a rainy, cold and humid climate, with fog being a common occurrence.

== Tenants ==
Both the men's football team and the women's football team play their home games in the Field. The club's youth teams competing in official leagues also play home games in this Field.

The neighbouring URCA football club also uses the Field for their home games.
