= Elsa Ventura =

Portuguese footballer

Personal information
- Full name: Elsa Margarida Meira Ventura
- Date of birth: 30 January 1990 (age 36)
- Place of birth: Portalegre, Portugal
- Position: Midfielder

Team information
- Current team: Sporting CP
- Number: 6

Senior career*
Years	Team	Apps	(Gls)
?–2012	Futebol Benfica		
2012–16	1º Dezembro		
2016–	Sporting CP		

International career
2006–2009	Portugal U-19		
2012–	Portugal		
- * Club domestic league appearances and goals

Elsa Margarida Meira Ventura is a Portuguese football midfielder currently playing for Sporting CP. She made her Champions League debut in August 2012, scoring against Glentoran LFC. She played then for SU 1º Dezembro.

A former Under-19 international, she was called up by the senior Portuguese national team for the first time in March 2012 replacing Edite Fernandes.
