= S.C. Lusitânia =

Portuguese association football club

Lusitânia
- Full name: Sport Club Lusitânia
- Nicknames: Leãos, Os Verdes Campeões
- Founded: 1922
- Ground: Campo de Jogos Carlos Alberto Sousa, Angra do Heroísmo, Azores Islands
- Capacity: 1,000
- Chairman: (Portugal) Pedro Tomé
- Manager: (Portugal) José Silva
- League: Campeonato de Portugal Group C
- 2025-26: Campeonato de Portugal Group C, 14th Relegated

The Sport Club Lusitânia (commonly shortened to S.C. Lusitânia) is a sports club located in Angra do Heroísmo on the island of Terceira, in the Portuguese archipelago of the Azores. Besides a football department, the club also has a basketball department that has played in the top level of the Portuguese men's basketball league system. The club also had a futsal team, that also played in the top division in the 24/25 season, but it has suspended activity as of the 25/26 season.

== History ==
The Sport Club Lusitânia was formed in 1922. It became the delegation number 14 of Sporting Clube de Portugal (Sporting CP). SC Lusitânia is club with the most championships in the Açores, which gave them their nickname "Os Verdes Campeões" (The green champions)

SC Lusitânia quickly became the dominant force in the Terceira Island, as they won the first championship of Angra Heroísmo in 1925, and won 9 of the first 10 championships, only being interrupted by SC Angrense in 1932. The club won 11 championships in a row from 1945-1955. Lusitânia continued to win most of the district championships, with unwavering support from their supporters, with many mainland clubs saying they feared the trip to Lusitânia for the intense crowd. Fans would pack the terrace and sometimes have to find a spot on a wall or roof to watch the match. The club, and the Terceira Island as a whole, reached its golden era from the 1940s to the early 1980s, with passionate fans attending matches every week, especially for Lusitânia. In 1964, they won the Açores Island championship, which gave them access to the Taça de Portugal, which in they reached the Semi Final, SC Lusitânia won promotion to the national leagues in 1977/78, becoming the first club from the Açores to do so. In the early days of national football, their support and atmosphere at the stadium was better than almost all the mainland clubs, as they regularly fought for promotion to the 2nd National Division. Slowly, with the access of television for the younger generation, support faded for Lusitânia as the younger generation watched the best clubs in the world on the television instead of the Lusitânia match. They remained in national divisions until 2011/12.

On September 1, 2002, SC Lusitânia defeated Sporting CP B 2-1 at Estádio João Paulo II in the 2nd round of II Divisão B Zona Sul 2002/03, In the Lineup of Sporting B, Cristiano Ronaldo played 84 minutes wearing the number 22. This was one of 2 games Ronaldo played for the B Team that season, and was his first domestic senior football appearance.

Their highest achievement is reaching the semifinals of the Taça de Portugal in 1964. They had defeated Ferroviário Lourenço Marques in the quarterfinals, the highest a Portuguese colony club ever reached in the Portuguese Cup (and only because the dictatorship of António de Oliveira Salazar allowed them to play as a means of demonstrating that Portugal's African possessions were provinces and not colonies). The club is headquartered at Dona Violante do Canto.

Sport Club Lusitânia had a mini golden age in the beginning of the 2020s, with Basketball reaching playoff semifinals, packing the pavilion full of fans, and footballs promotion to Liga 3 in the 2023/24 season, along with Futsal being promoted to Liga Placard in the 23/24 season as well. The U19 Football team played 2 seasons in the top league, in 23/24 and 24/25.

== Current squad ==
As of 8 November, 2024

Note: Flags indicate national team as defined under FIFA eligibility rules; some limited exceptions apply. Players may hold more than one non-FIFA nationality.

No.	Pos.	Nation	Player
1	GK	POR	João Monteiro
2	DF	BRA	Derick
3	DF	POR	Bernardo Fontes
4	DF	POR	Diogo Careca
5	MF	BRA	Caio Silva
7	FW	POR	Telmo Watche
8	MF	POR	Tomás Azevedo
9	FW	BRA	Nico Souza
10	MF	BRA	Rafa Tchê
11	FW	COL	Juan Nazarit
14	DF	POR	André Amaral
15	DF	POR	Breno
16	FW	ITA	Maikol Cifuentes
17	FW	POR	Isabelinha

No.	Pos.	Nation	Player
18	MF	BRA	Pedro do Rio
19	DF	POR	David Semedo
20	MF	POR	Rafinha
23	MF	POR	Jony
24	DF	BRA	Jefinho
27	MF	POR	Legatheaux
32	FW	ANG	Jefer Gunjo
42	MF	POR	Bavikson Biai (captain)
48	FW	POR	Gonçalo Cabral
53	DF	POR	Edu (on loan from Chaves)
70	MF	COL	Didier Mosquera
72	GK	POR	Diogo Sá
77	FW	POR	Celso Sidney
93	DF	FRA	Enzo Ferrara

== Basketball team ==
The men's basketball team is part of the Portuguese Basketball League (LCB).
