= Fábio Duarte =

Cape Verdean footballer

Personal information
- Full name: Fábio Miguel Silva Duarte
- Date of birth: 1 May 1998 (age 28)
- Place of birth: Amadora, Portugal
- Height: 1.87 m (6 ft 2 in)
- Position: Goalkeeper

Team information
- Current team: Sporting da Covilhã
- Number: 12

Youth career
- 2007–2018: Benfica
- 2014–2015: → Belenenses (loan)

Senior career*
Years	Team	Apps	(Gls)
2016–2022	Benfica B	28	(0)
2022–2023	Vilafranquense	4	(0)
2023–2024	AVS	0	(0)
2024–2026	1º Dezembro	13	(0)
2026–	Sporting da Covilhã	0	(0)

International career^{‡}
2012	Portugal U15	1	(0)
2013	Portugal U16	6	(0)
2014–2015	Portugal U17	14	(0)
2016	Portugal U18	3	(0)
2016	Portugal U19	2	(0)
2017–2018	Portugal U20	3	(0)
- * Club domestic league appearances and goals as of 12 September 2026 ‡ National team caps and goals as of 27 March 2018

Fábio Miguel Silva Duarte (born 11 May 1998) is a professional footballer who plays as a goalkeeper for Liga 3 club Sporting da Covilhã. Born in Portugal, he has committed to play for the Cape Verde national team.

== Club career ==
Born in Amadora, Duarte started his football career at S.L. Benfica's youth system in 2007. Following his progress through their youth ranks, he made his professional debut with the club's reserve team in a 5–1 LigaPro loss to Real on 18 February 2018.

== International career ==
Duarte has represented Portugal at youth level.

On 10 March 2026, Duarte received approval from FIFA to switch his international allegiance to the Cape Verde national team.

== Honours ==
Benfica

- UEFA Youth League runner-up: 2016–17
