= Juan Nazarit =

Colombian footballer (born 2003)

Juan Esteban Mina
Personal information
- Full name: Juan Esteban Mina Nazarit
- Date of birth: 27 March 2003 (age 23)
- Place of birth: Santander de Quilichao, Cauca, Colombia
- Height: 1.85 m (6 ft 1 in)
- Position: Forward

Team information
- Current team: 1º Dezembro
- Number: 17

Youth career
- Síntesis Talento y Vida

Senior career*
Years	Team	Apps	(Gls)
2021–2022	Lusitânia	8	(5)
2022–2023	Estoril Praia	0	(0)
2022	→ Patriotas Boyacá (loan)	0	(0)
2022–2023	→ Lusitânia (loan)	6	(2)
2023	→ Metalac (loan)	14	(0)
2024–2025	Lusitânia	5	(0)
2025	Orsomarso	2	(1)
2025–	1º Dezembro	4	(0)
- * Club domestic league appearances and goals as of 7 May 2026

Juan Esteban Mina Nazarit (born 27 March 2003) is a Colombian footballer who plays as a forward for Portuguese Liga 3 club 1º Dezembro.

== Club career ==
Born in Santander de Quilichao in the Cauca Department of Colombia, Mina played for amateur side Síntesis Talento y Vida in his youth. He moved to Portugal in 2021, joining Lusitânia in the Liga Meo Azores, the fifth division of Portuguese football. In January of the following year, he signed for Primeira Liga side Estoril Praia, being assigned to their under-23 squad.

Later in 2022, he returned to Colombia, joining Patriotas Boyacá on a season-long loan deal. He played twice in the Copa Colombia, and was named on the bench once for a Categoría Primera A match against América de Cali, though he did not feature. By the end of the year, he had returned to Portugal, re-joining Lusitânia on a short-term loan deal.

In January 2023, he was strongly linked with a move to Académica, even training with the team, but this deal eventually fell through. Ahead of the start of the 2023–24 season, he joined Serbian First League side Metalac on a season-long loan deal.

== Career statistics ==
=== Club ===
As of 7 August 2023.

Appearances and goals by club, season and competition
Club	Season	League			Cup		Other		Total	
Club	Season	Division	Apps	Goals	Apps	Goals	Apps	Goals	Apps	Goals
Lusitânia	2021–22	Liga Meo Azores	8	5	0	0	0	0	8	5
Estoril Praia	2021–22	Primeira Liga	0	0	0	0	0	0	0	0
Estoril Praia	2022–23	Primeira Liga	0	0	0	0	0	0	0	0
Estoril Praia	2023–24	Primeira Liga	0	0	0	0	0	0	0	0
Estoril Praia	Total		0	0	0	0	0	0	0	0
Patriotas Boyacá (loan)	2022	Categoría Primera A	0	0	2 (Note: Appearances in the Copa Colombia)	0	0	0	2	0
Lusitânia (loan)	2022–23	Liga Meo Azores	6	2	0	0	0	0	6	2
Metalac (loan)	2023–24	Serbian First League	1	0	0	0	0	0	1	0
Career total			15	7	2	0	0	0	17	7
