= José Picón =

Spanish footballer

Personal information
- Full name: José Antonio Picón Sedano
- Date of birth: 13 May 1988 (age 38)
- Place of birth: Santander, Spain
- Height: 1.83 m (6 ft 0 in)
- Position: Right-back

Youth career
- Monte
- 1997–2006: Racing Santander

Senior career*
Years	Team	Apps	(Gls)
2006–2011	Racing B	59	(1)
2009–2012	Racing Santander	4	(0)
2010–2011	→ Pontevedra (loan)	25	(0)
2012–2013	Atlético Baleares	7	(0)
2013	Salamanca	0	(0)
2013	Glyfada	8	(1)
2014	Cartagena	13	(0)
2014–2015	Conquense	24	(0)
2015–2017	Leioa	51	(4)
2017–2021	Barakaldo	73	(1)
2021–2023	Tropezón	41	(1)
2023–2025	Escobedo	45	(6)
Total		350	(14)
- * Club domestic league appearances and goals

José Antonio Picón Sedano (born 13 May 1988) is a Spanish former professional footballer who played as a right-back.

== Playing career ==
Picón was born in Santander, Cantabria. A product of hometown club Racing de Santander's academy, he made his first-team – and La Liga – debut on 23 April 2009, coming on as a last-minute substitute for Nikola Žigić in a 5–1 home win against Atlético Madrid. He spent the vast majority of his spell, however, playing for the reserve side in the Segunda División B.

For the 2010–11 season, Picón remained in the third division, joining Pontevedra CF on loan. A very brief spell in Greece with A.O. Glyfada notwithstanding, he continued competing in that tier the following years, but also in amateur football; he notably achieved a first-ever promotion to Segunda Federación with UM Escobedo at the end of 2023–24.

== Post-retirement ==
Immediately after retiring in 2025 aged 37, Picón returned to Racing Santander as youth system coordinator.
