= Panos Theodorou =

Cypriot footballer (1994–2023)

Personal information
- Date of birth: 3 September 1994
- Place of birth: Limassol, Cyprus
- Date of death: 5 October 2023 (aged 29)
- Place of death: Limassol, Cyprus
- Position: Midfielder

Senior career*
Years	Team	Apps	(Gls)
2010–2013	Apollon Limassol	2	(0)
2013–2015	Aris Limassol	35	(1)
2015–2016	AEL Limassol	2	(0)
2016–2017	Pafos	0	(0)
Total		39	(1)

International career
2014–2015	Cyprus U21	3	(1)
- * Club domestic league appearances and goals

Panos Theodorou (Greek: Πάνος Θεοδώρου, 3 September 1994 – 5 October 2023) was a Cypriot footballer who played as a midfielder.

On 5 October 2023, it was announced by his former club Apollon Limassol that Panos had died in the morning from an accident at work involving a forklift. He was 29. It was also stated that Panos had recently been a referee for the Cypriot Second Division.
