= Paula Cristina =

Portuguese footballer (born 1975)

Personal information
- Full name: Paula Cristina Dias Santos
- Date of birth: 7 July 1975 (age 51)
- Place of birth: Mafamude, Vila Nova de Gaia, Portugal
- Height: 1.68 m (5 ft 6 in)
- Position: Midfielder

Senior career*
Years	Team	Apps	(Gls)
2000–2002	Gatões Futebol Clube		
2002–2004	S.U. 1º de Dezembro		
2006–2009	ARC Várzea		
2009–2010	Gatões Futebol Clube		
2010–2014	S.U. 1º de Dezembro		

International career
1995–2010	Portugal	102	(9)
- * Club domestic league appearances and goals

Paula Cristina (born 7 July 1975) is a Portuguese former football player, who played for Portugal from 1995 to 2010.

== Club career ==
Paula Cristina won the Campeonato Nacional de Futebol with S.U. 1º de Dezembro twice in 2010–11 and 2011–12, yet failed to qualify for the UEFA Women's Champions League after three attempts.

== International career ==
On 15 June 1995, Paula Cristina played her first international match at the age of 19. On June 19, 2010, she made her 100th national match. Two months later, on the 25th of August 2010, she played her 102nd and last international match.
