= Kreshnic Krasniqi =

Kosovan footballer

Personal information
- Full name: Kreshnic Krasniqi
- Date of birth: 15 September 1994 (age 32)
- Place of birth: Kosovo
- Height: 1.76 m (5 ft 9 in)
- Position: Midfielder

Team information
- Current team: Dulwich Hamlet

Youth career
- Dagenham & Redbridge

Senior career*
Years	Team	Apps	(Gls)
2013–2014	Ormideia	23	(1)
2014–2016	Ethnikos Achna	6	(0)
2015	→ THOI Lakatamia (loan)	9	(0)
2016–2017	Billericay Town	35	(2)
2017	Enfield Town	0	(0)
2017	Barking	6	(1)
2017–2019	Heybridge Swifts	65	(18)
2019–2020	Concord Rangers	26	(4)
2020	Wealdstone	3	(0)
2020–2021	Maidstone United	7	(1)
2021–2022	Ebbsfleet United	4	(0)
2022	→ Billericay Town (loan)	11	(0)
2022–	Dulwich Hamlet	25	(0)
- * Club domestic league appearances and goals as of 11:27, 11 April 2023 (UTC)

Kreshnic Krasniqi (born 15 September 1994) is a Kosovan footballer who plays for Dulwich Hamlet.

== Club career ==
On 20 September 2014, Kreshnic made his professional debut for Ethnikos Achna in the Cypriot First Division during the 2–1 loss to Nea Salamis, coming on as a 68th-minute substitute. He later played for Heybridge Swifts as a midfielder.

Krasniqi joined Ebbsfleet United in June 2021.

On 5 February 2022, Krasniqi returned to former club Billericay Town on an initial one-month loan deal.

On 29 June 2022, Krasniqi joined National League South club Dulwich Hamlet.

== Career statistics ==
=== Club ===
As of 23 March 2015.

Appearances and goals by club, season and competition
Club	Season	League			Cup		Europe		Other		Total	
Club	Season	Division	Apps	Goals	Apps	Goals	Apps	Goals	Apps	Goals	Apps	Goals
Ormideia	2013–14	Cypriot Third Division	23	1	5	0	0	0	0	0	28	1
Ethnikos Achna	2014–15	Cypriot First Division	3	0	0	0	0	0	0	0	3	0
Thoi Lakatamia (loan)	2014–15	Cypriot Third Division	9	0	0	0	0	0	0	0	9	0
Career total			35	1	5	0	0	0	0	0	40	1
