= C.F. Os Belenenses (women) =

Portuguese sports club

Os Belenenses
- Full name: Clube de Futebol Os Belenenses
- Nicknames: O Belém (The Bethlehem); As Azuis do Restelo (The Blues from Restelo); Pastéis (Pastries); A Cruz de Cristo (The Order of Christ Cross)
- Founded: 23 September 1919; 106 years ago
- President: Patrick Morais de Carvalho
- Manager: Nuno Ferreira
- League: Campeonato Nacional de Futebol Feminino
- Website: http://www.osbelenenses.com/
| Home colours | Away colours |

Clube de Futebol Os Belenenses (Portuguese pronunciation: [bɨlɨˈnẽsɨʃ]), commonly known as Os Belenenses or simply Beleneneses, is a Portuguese women's football club based in the Belém parish of Lisbon. The team, a section of C.F. Os Belenenses.

== Current squad ==
As of 9 September 2016

Note: Flags indicate national team as defined under FIFA eligibility rules; some limited exceptions apply. Players may hold more than one non-FIFA nationality.

| No. | Pos. | Nation | Player |
|---|---|---|---|
| — | GK | POR | Sónia Castanheira |
| — | GK | POR | Margarida Costa |
| — | GK | POR | Carolina Vilão |
| — | DF | POR | Catarina Balão |
| — | DF | POR | Patrícia Balão |
| — | DF | POR | Catarina Pereira |
| — | DF | POR | Inês Salvador |
| — | DF | POR | Marta Santos |

| No. | Pos. | Nation | Player |
|---|---|---|---|
| — | MF | POR | Rita Barreto |
| — | MF | POR | Joana Marques |
| — | MF | POR | Patrícia Pelado |
| — | | POR | Margarida Batlleyfont |
| — | | POR | Daniela Bernardes |
| — | | POR | Diana Bernardes |
| — | | POR | Jennyfer Ramos |
| — | | POR | Sara Reis |
