= Yiannis Pachipis =

Cypriot footballer (born 1994)

Personal information
- Full name: Yiannis Pachipis
- Date of birth: February 3, 1994 (age 32)
- Place of birth: Limassol, Cyprus
- Position: Winger

Team information
- Current team: AEZ Zakakiou
- Number: 10

Youth career
- 2009–2012: AEL Limassol

Senior career*
Years	Team	Apps	(Gls)
2012–2014	Olympiakos Nicosia	32	(14)
2014–2015	Karmiotissa Polemidion	24	(1)
2015–2016	Olympiakos Nicosia	22	(2)
2016	AEZ Zakakiou	4	(0)
2017–2019	Olympiakos Nicosia	56	(2)
2019–2020	Alki Oroklini	5	(0)
2020–2021	Aris Limassol		
2021–	AEZ Zakakiou		

International career
2013	Cyprus U19	3	(0)
2014–2015	Cyprus U21	3	(0)
- * Club domestic league appearances and goals as of 16:54, 11 January 2022 (UTC)

Yiannis Pachipis (Greek: Γιάννης Παχίπης, born 3 February 1994) is a Cypriot footballer who plays for AEZ Zakakiou as a winger.

== Career ==
A product of the AEL Limassol academy he regularly played as a winger for Olympiakos Nicosia for two seasons. In 2014–15 season he played for Karmiotissa Polemidion before returning to Olympiakos Nicosia in July 2015. In 2016, he joined AEZ Zakakiou in the Cypriot First Division before returning in 2017 to Olympiakos Nicosia until 2019.

In September 2021, Pachipis joined AEZ Zakakiou.
