= David Mena (footballer) =

Colombian footballer (born 1992)

Personal information
- Full name: Jhoan David Rojas Mena
- Date of birth: 13 February 1992 (age 34)
- Place of birth: Valle del Cauca, Colombia
- Height: 1.89 m (6 ft 2 in)
- Position: Defender

Team information
- Current team: Upfield SC

Youth career
- Deportivo Cali

Senior career*
Years	Team	Apps	(Gls)
2013–2015	Apollon Limassol	6	(0)
2014–2015	→ Ayia Napa (loan)	11	(1)
2015–2016	Cimarrones	3	(0)
2018	Nevėžis	15	(1)
2018	Tskhinvali	7	(1)
2019	Esperanza SC		
2020–	Upfield SC		
- * Club domestic league appearances and goals as of 19:41, 2 June 2020 (UTC)

Jhoan David Rojas Mena (born 13 February 1992) is a Colombian footballer who plays as a defender for Australian club Upfield SC.

== Career ==
=== Club career ===
In the 2019, Rojas played for Japanese club Esperanza SC. In February 2020, he moved to Australian club Upfield SC.
