= João Freitas =

Portuguese footballer (born 1992)

Personal information
- Full name: João Filipe Pereira de Freitas
- Date of birth: 4 June 1992 (age 34)
- Place of birth: Sintra, Portugal
- Height: 1.83 m (6 ft 0 in)
- Position: Centre back

Team information
- Current team: 1º Dezembro
- Number: 26

Youth career
- 2000–2004: 1º Dezembro
- 2004–2005: Estoril Praia
- 2005–2011: Sporting

Senior career*
Years	Team	Apps	(Gls)
2011–2012	Moura	27	(1)
2012–2013	Sertanense	5	(0)
2013	Amora	14	(2)
2013–2016	Casa Pia	85	(6)
2016–2017	Leixões	11	(0)
2017	→ Gafanha (loan)	9	(0)
2017–2019	Vilafranquense	69	(7)
2019–2022	Alverca	70	(5)
2022–2023	Vitória de Setúbal	17	(0)
2023–2024	Atlético	21	(1)
2024–	1º Dezembro	49	(2)
- * Club domestic league appearances and goals as of 7 May 2026

João Filipe Pereira de Freitas (born 4 June 1992) is a Portuguese footballer who plays for 1º Dezembro as a defender.

== Club career ==
On 28 August 2016, Freitas made his professional debut with Leixões in a 2016–17 LigaPro match against Varzim.
