= Giorgos Loizou =

Cypriot footballer

Personal information
- Full name: Giorgos Loizou
- Date of birth: May 29, 1990 (age 36)
- Place of birth: Nicosia, Cyprus
- Position: Striker

Team information
- Current team: Kornos
- Number: 19

Senior career*
| Years | Team | Apps | (Gls) |
| 2010–2011 | Adonis Idaliou | 19 | (5) |
| 2011 | APOP Kinyras Peyias | 7 | (2) |
| 2012 | Kedros Agias Marinas | 9 | (2) |
| 2012–2013 | Onisilos Sotira | 16 | (1) |
| 2013–2015 | Othellos Athienou | 36 | (8) |
| 2015–2016 | Olympiakos Nicosia | 16 | (2) |
| 2016–2017 | Chalkanoras Idaliou | 28 | (7) |
| 2018 | Ethnikos Latsion | 11 | (4) |
| 2019–2022 | Kornos | 43 | (38) |
| 2022–2023 | Chalkanoras Idaliou | 28 | (0) |
| 2023– | Kornos | 10 | (8) |
- * Club domestic league appearances and goals as of 20:49, 4 November 2024 (UTC)

Giorgos Loizou (Greek: Γιώργος Λοϊζου, born 29 May 1990) is a Cypriot footballer who plays for Kornos FC 2013 as a striker.

== Career ==
=== Early career ===
Loizou, born in Nicosia, begun his football career from Adonis Idaliou and then he had brief spell from two Paphos clubs, APOP Kinyras Peyias and Kedros Agias Marinas. In 2012–13 season, he was member of Cypriot Second Division club Onisilos Sotira where he was so unlucky, since he sustained cruciate ligament rupture.

=== Othellos Athienou ===
Next season he moved on to Othellos Athienou where he gained the promotion to first division with club by finishing in the second place. For the season 2013-14 he scored 8 goals in eighteen matches, being the third goalscorer of the team, and contributed greatly to the progress of Othellos to reach for the first time in the history to the first division.

With Othellos playing for the first time ever in the first division, Loizou was the key player in the matches against the league leaders Apollon Limassol in second phase of 2014–15 Cypriot Cup as he scored two goals making the surprise to win and went through to the quarterfinals.

=== Olympiakos Nicosia ===
In July 2015, Loizou agreed to sign with Cypriot Second Division club Olympiakos Nicosia.

== Career statistics ==
=== Club ===
As of 23 May 2015.

| Club | Season | League | | | Cup | | Europe | | Other | | Total | |
| Club | Season | Division | Apps | Goals | Apps | Goals | Apps | Goals | Apps | Goals | Apps | Goals |
|---|---|---|---|---|---|---|---|---|---|---|---|---|
| Othellos Athienou | 2013–14 | Cypriot Second Division | 18 | 8 | 1 | 0 | 0 | 0 | 0 | 0 | 19 | 8 |
| Othellos Athienou | 2014–15 | Cypriot First Division | 18 | 0 | 3 | 2 | 0 | 0 | 0 | 0 | 21 | 2 |
| Olympiakos Nicosia | 2015–16 | Cypriot Second Division | 0 | 0 | 0 | 0 | 0 | 0 | 0 | 0 | 0 | 0 |
| Career total | | | 36 | 8 | 4 | 2 | 0 | 0 | 0 | 0 | 40 | 10 |
