= Bassalia Ouattara =

Ivorian footballer (born 1992)

Personal information
- Date of birth: 24 April 1992 (age 34)
- Place of birth: Bondoukou, Ivory Coast
- Height: 1.73 m (5 ft 8 in)
- Position: Midfielder

Team information
- Current team: Vilar de Perdizes
- Number: 30

Youth career
- 2010–2011: Académica de Coimbra

Senior career*
Years	Team	Apps	(Gls)
2011–2013	Académica de Coimbra	0	(0)
2011–2012	→ Gondomar (loan)	18	(2)
2012	→ União da Madeira (loan)	3	(1)
2013	→ Tocha (loan)	12	(3)
2013–2014	Académico de Viseu	21	(2)
2014–2015	Atlético CP	18	(1)
2015	Feirense	14	(1)
2015	Lusitano FCV	5	(0)
2015–2016	Torreense	16	(0)
2016–2017	Sintrense	21	(3)
2017–2018	Anadia	20	(1)
2018–2019	AD Nogueirense	30	(4)
2019–2020	Sertanense	7	(0)
2020–2022	Montalegre	41	(2)
2023	Pedras Salgadas	10	(1)
2023–	Vilar de Perdizes	23	(1)
- * Club domestic league appearances and goals as of 18:08, 31 March 2024 (UTC)

Bassalia Ouattara (born 24 February 1992) is an Ivorian footballer who plays as a midfielder for Portuguese Campeonato de Portugal side Vilar de Perdizes.

== Career ==
He made his professional debut in the Segunda Liga for União da Madeira on 9 September 2012 in a game against Santa Clara.
