= Patrícia Gouveia =

Portuguese footballer and coach (born 1987)

Personal information
- Full name: Patrícia Alexandra Carvalho Ferreira Sousa Gouveia
- Date of birth: 26 April 1987 (age 39)
- Place of birth: São Sebastião da Pedreira, Portugal
- Height: 1.66 m (5 ft 5 in)

Senior career*
Years	Team	Apps	(Gls)
2003–2008	1º Dezembro	1	(1)
2008–2009	Odivelas	?	(?)
2009–2011	CF Benfica	4	(0)
2011–2013	1º Dezembro	42	(12)
2013–2014	Chiasiellis	19	(1)
2014–2016	CF Benfica	28	(2)
2016–2019	Sporting CP	17	(5)

International career^{‡}
2005	Portugal U-18	1	(0)
2005–2006	Portugal U-19	10	(0)
2006–2015	Portugal	16	(0)

Managerial career
- 2019: Sporting CP
- * Club domestic league appearances and goals as of 17:21, 6 April 2021 (UTC) ‡ National team caps and goals as of 17:21, 6 April 2021 (UTC)

Patrícia Alexandra Carvalho Ferreira Sousa Gouveia (born 26 April 1987) is a Portuguese former footballer who played for the Portugal women's national football team on 16 occasions. At club level, she played for 1º Dezembro, Odivelas, CF Benfica, and Sporting CP. She also coached Sporting CP for a time in 2019.

== Club career ==
At club level, Gouveia played for Portuguese teams 1º Dezembro, Odivelas, and CF Benfica. She played for Italian team Chiasiellis in the 2013–14 season, before transferring back to CF Benfica. In that period, she won five Campeonato Nacional Feminino Championships, and the 2011–12 Taça de Portugal Feminina; Gouveia scored for 1º Dezembro in the Final, as they beat Albergaria 4–0.

In July 2016, Gouveia transferred from Benfica to Sporting CP, and was the team's first captain. Later in the year, Gouveia became pregnant, and had to fight for paid maternity leave. Whilst at Sporting CP, Gouveia won two Campeonato Nacional Feminino Championships, two Taça de Portugal Feminina, and one Supertaça de Portugal Feminina.

== International career ==
Gouveia made one appearance for Portugal under-18s, and 10 appearances for Portugal under-19s. She made 16 appearances for the senior side, between 2006 and 2015. She was in the Portugal squad for the 2013 Algarve Cup. She missed playing for Portugal at UEFA Women's Euro 2017 as she was on maternity leave; it was the first time that Portugal had qualified for the tournament.

== Post-playing career ==
In 2019, Gouveia quit playing football to become manager of Sporting CP. Later in the year, she left the role and was replaced by Susana Cova. In 2020, Gouveia was supportive of FIFA demanding that all nations provide 14 weeks of paid maternity leave for pregnant footballers.

== Personal life ==
Gouveia is from São Sebastião da Pedreira, Lisbon, Portugal.
