= Panagiotis Loizidis =

Cypriot footballer

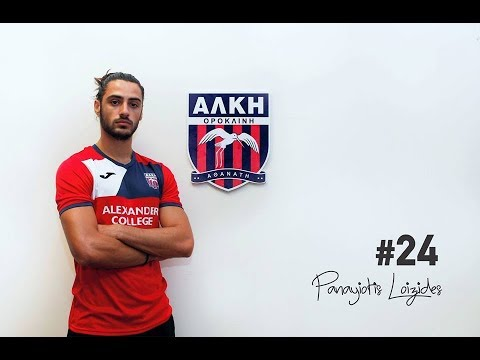

Personal information
- Date of birth: 28 February 1995 (age 31)
- Place of birth: Larnaca, Cyprus
- Height: 1.80 m (5 ft 11 in)
- Position: Right-back

Team information
- Current team: AEZ Zakakiou
- Number: 7

Youth career
- –2012: Anorthosis Famagusta

Senior career*
Years	Team	Apps	(Gls)
2012–2016	Anorthosis Famagusta	13	(0)
2014–2015	→ Nea Salamina (loan)	7	(0)
2015–2016	→ Ayia Napa (loan)	10	(1)
2016–2017	Omonia Aradippou	22	(0)
2017–2019	Alki Oroklini	24	(0)
2019–2020	Ermis Aradippou	19	(0)
2020–2021	Ayia Napa	17	(0)
2021–2022	Alki Oroklini	4	(0)
2022–2023	Omonia Aradippou	25	(1)
2023–2024	Peyia 2014	16	(0)
2024–	AEZ Zakakiou	15	(1)

International career
2011–2012	Cyprus U17	3	(0)
2012–2014	Cyprus U19	10	(0)
- * Club domestic league appearances and goals as of 26 June 2025

Panagiotis Loizidis (Greek: Παναγιώτης Λοϊζίδης; born 28 February 1995) is a Cypriot footballer who plays for Cypriot Second Division club AEZ Zakakiou. He plays as a right-back.

== Club career ==
Panagiotis Loizidis made his debut for Anorthosis Famagusta in a match against Apoel Nicosia.

On 27 June 2019, Loizidis joined Ermis Aradippou FC.
