= Adriana Gomes =

Female Portuguese footballer

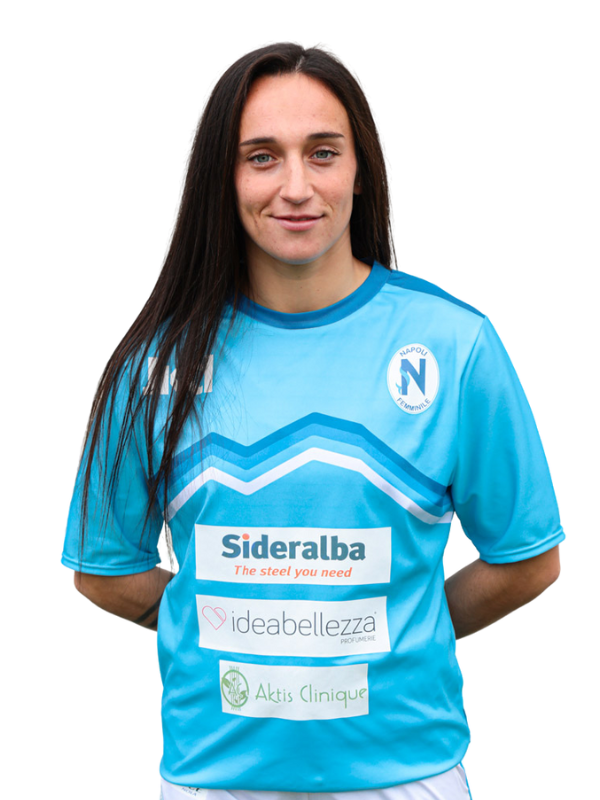

Personal information
- Date of birth: 3 November 1993 (age 32)
- Position: Midfielder

Adriana Gomes (born 3 November 1993) is a Portuguese football player who plays for Lazio in Serie A. Gomes has previously played for Napoli.
