= Jordan Palmer-Samuels =

English footballer (born 1994)

Personal information
- Date of birth: 12 September 1994 (age 32)
- Place of birth: London, England
- Position: Midfielder

Youth career
- 2009–2011: Arsenal
- 2011–2013: Nottingham Forest

Senior career*
Years	Team	Apps	(Gls)
2013	Hayes & Yeading United	1	(0)
2014–2015	N & S Erimis	16	(7)
2015	Karmiotissa	7	(1)
2016	EN Parekklisia	12	(5)
2016	ENY Digenis Ypsona	10	(1)
- * Club domestic league appearances and goals

Jordan Palmer-Samuels (born 12 September 1994) is an English former professional footballer who played as a striker and winger.

== Career ==
Palmer-Samuels joined the Arsenal Academy in October 2009 at the age of fifteen, after a short spell with Leyton Orient youth programme. He later joined in July 2011 Nottingham Forest on a 3-year deal where he was a regular for the under 18s.

In August 2013, Palmer-Samuels joined National League South side Hayes & Yeading United. He made his one and only appearance for the side 26 August 2013, playing 64 minutes in a 1–0 loss to Eastbourne Borough. He later played in Cyprus for Karmiotissa and EN Parekklisia.

== Personal life ==
In 2017, Palmer-Samuels appeared in a Red Bull documentary series called The Streets Don't Lie alongside Djibril Cissé in a bid to earn a week-long trial with RB Leipzig.
