= Timotheos Pavlou =

Cypriot footballer (born 1994)

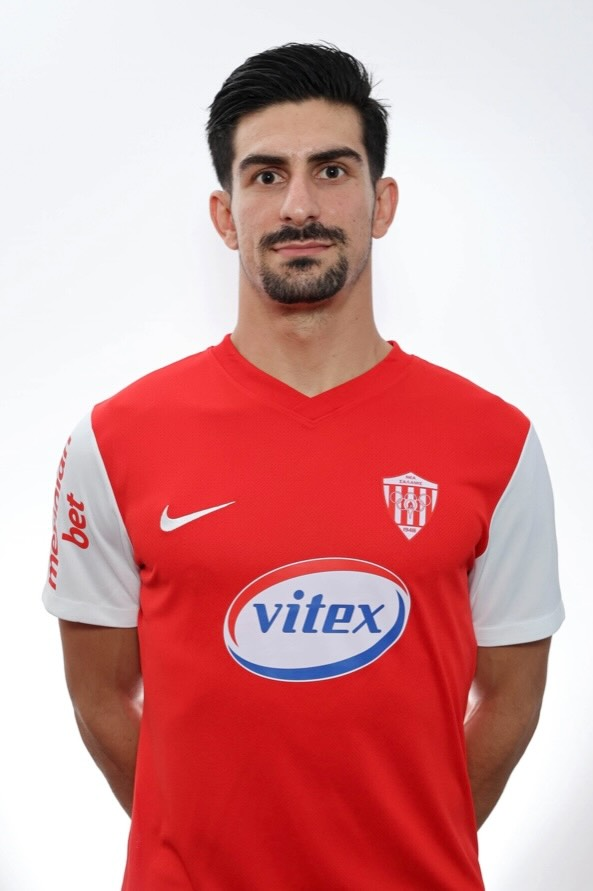

Personal information
- Date of birth: 8 September 1994 (age 32)
- Place of birth: Larnaca, Cyprus
- Height: 1.78 m (5 ft 10 in)
- Positions: Right back; winger

Team information
- Current team: Ethnikos Achna FC

Youth career
- 2008–2011: Nea Salamina

Senior career*
Years	Team	Apps	(Gls)
2011–2014	Nea Salamina	15	(0)
2014–2015	→ Digenis Oroklinis (loan)	29	(3)
2015–2016	→ Othellos Athienou FC (loan)	13	(3)
2016–2018	ASIL Lysi	47	(9)
2018–2022	Nea Salamina	52	(0)
2023	Omonia Aradippou	12	(0)
2023–2025	Omonia 29M	52	(0)
2025-2026	Karmiotissa FC	30	(5)
2026-	Ethnikos Achna FC		
- * Club domestic league appearances and goals as of 29 June 2026

Timotheos Pavlou (Greek: Τιμόθεος Παύλου; born 8 September 1994) is a Cypriot footballer who plays as a right-back for Ethnikos Achna FC.

He began his football development in Cyprus, progressing through the domestic football system before starting his senior career in Cypriot club football. Over the course of his career, he has represented several clubs in Cyprus top flight, including Nea Salamina and Omonia 29M.

Primarily operating as a right-back, Pavlou is known for his defensive positioning, discipline and ability to support attacking play from wide areas.
