= Alkiviadis Christofi =

Cypriot footballer (born 1992)

Personal information
- Date of birth: 20 January 1992 (age 34)
- Place of birth: Cyprus
- Position: Midfielder

Team information
- Current team: AEZ Zakakiou
- Number: 14

Senior career*
Years	Team	Apps	(Gls)
2014–2015	Karmiotissa		
2015	Nea Salamis Famagusta		
2015–2023	Karmiotissa		
2023–	AEZ Zakakiou	15	(0)
- * Club domestic league appearances and goals as of 20 June 2024

Alkiviadis Christofi (Greek: Αλκιβιάδης Χριστοφή born 20 January 1992) is a Cypriot professional footballer who plays for AEZ Zakakiou.

Before the new season, he took part in four preseason friendlies at an opulent resort in Maribor, Slovenia.
