= Jefferson (footballer, born August 1988) =

Brazilian footballer

Personal information
- Full name: Jefferson Lopes Faustino
- Date of birth: 31 August 1988 (age 38)
- Place of birth: Rio de Janeiro, Brazil
- Height: 1.91 m (6 ft 3 in)
- Position: Centre back

Team information
- Current team: Audax Rio

Senior career*
Years	Team	Apps	(Gls)
2010–2011	Tiradentes	8	(1)
2011–2012	Universitario de Sucre	37	(6)
2013	Roasso Kumamoto		
2014	The Strongest	13	(0)
2015–2016	Sport Boys Warnes	31	(1)
2017	Real Noroeste		
2017–201?	Audax Rio		
2018	Democrata-GV	7	(0)
2018–	Universitario de Sucre	9	(0)
- * Club domestic league appearances and goals as of 31 December 2018

Jefferson Lopes Faustino, commonly known as Jefferson (born 31 August 1988 in Rio de Janeiro) is a Brazilian footballer who plays as a centre back. He played for several seasons in the Bolivian Primera División for Universitario de Sucre, The Strongest and Sport Boys Warnes, with whom he won the 2015 Apertura.
