= Carla Couto =

Portuguese footballer (born 1974)

Personal information
- Full name: Carla Sofia Basilio Couto
- Date of birth: 12 April 1974 (age 52)
- Place of birth: Lisbon, Portugal
- Height: 1.64 m (5 ft 5 in)
- Position: Striker

Senior career*
Years	Team	Apps	(Gls)
1990–1992	Sporting CP		
1992–1993	Trajouce		
1993–1997	1º Dezembro		
1997–1998	CF Benfica		
1998–2002	1º Dezembro		
2002	Guangdong Haiyin		
2003–2011	1º Dezembro		
2011–2012	Lazio	24	(4)
2012–2014	Valadares Gaia		

International career
1993–2012	Portugal	145	(29)
- * Club domestic league appearances and goals

Carla Sofia Basilio Couto is a Portuguese former football striker who played for several clubs in the Campeonato Nacional de Futebol Feminino. In season 2011–12 she represented SS Lazio in Italy's Serie A.

A member of the Portugal national team since 1993, Couto retired from the national team in July 2012. She scored 29 goals in her record 145 caps.

Couto retired from football in 2014, after two seasons with Valadares Gaia. She spent a total of 14 years with 1º Dezembro and won 11 League titles and six Portuguese Women's Cups.
