= Edite Fernandes =

Portuguese footballer (born 1979)

Personal information
- Full name: Edite Cristiana Fernandes
- Date of birth: 10 October 1979 (age 47)
- Place of birth: Vila do Conde, Portugal
- Height: 1.57 m (5 ft 2 in)
- Position: Forward

Youth career
- Boavista

Senior career*
Years	Team	Apps	(Gls)
1996–1998	Boavista		
1998–2003	1º Dezembro		
2003–2004	Peña NS Antigua		
2004–2005	Estudiantes Huelva	14	(3)
–	Team Beijing		
2008–2009	Prainsa Zaragoza	29	(8)
2009–2010	Atlético Madrid	19	(3)
2010	Donn	7	(4)
2010–2012	Prainsa Zaragoza	39	(13)
2011	Santa Clarita Blue Heat	12	(9)
2012–2016	Valadares Gaia		
2016–2018	SC Braga		
2018–2021	CF Benfica		

International career^{‡}
1997–2016	Portugal	132	(39)
- * Club domestic league appearances and goals ‡ National team caps and goals as of 16:38, 25 September 2016 (UTC)

Edite Cristiana Fernandes (born 10 October 1979) is a Portuguese former footballer who most recently played for CF Benfica of the Campeonato Nacional de Futebol Feminino. She is a former captain of the Portugal women's national football team, who scored a national record 39 goals in the 132 caps she accumulated between 1997 and 2016.

== Club career ==
Edite began her career with local club Boavista, before moving to Lisbon side 1º Dezembro at age 19. She would win nine Portuguese Liga titles and three Portugal Cups at the two clubs before moving abroad to play in China and Spain.

In August 2002 Edite was the Player of the Match as Beijing Chengjian beat Shanghai SVA on penalties in the Chinese Women's Super League final.

She has played for several clubs in Spain, and joined Arsenal Ladies F.C. for pre-season training but did not sign a permanent deal with the club. She also played in Norway's Toppserien with Donn during 2010.

Veteran Edite transferred from SC Braga to CF Benfica in July 2018. In April 2021, 41-year-old Edite announced her departure from CF Benfica and her retirement as a footballer.

== International career ==
Edite made her Portugal national team debut in a friendly match against Belgium at Cantanhede in 1997. In November 2011 she made her 100th appearance for the national team, having scored 31 goals. In March 2016 she moved level with Luís Figo's total of 129 caps.

== International goals ==
Scores and results list Portugal's goal tally first.

No.	Date	Venue	Opponent	Score	Result	Competition
1.	15 March 2001	Albufeira, Portugal	Canada	1–1	1–2	2001 Algarve Cup
2.	18 March 2003	Quarteira, Portugal	Republic of Ireland	2–2	3–2	2003 Algarve Cup
3.	1 November 2005	Alcochete, Portugal	Sweden	1–3	1–4	2007 FIFA Women's World Cup qualification
4.	7 May 2006	Trelleborg, Sweden	Sweden	1–1	1–5	2007 FIFA Women's World Cup qualification
5.	27 October 2007	Viborg, Denmark	Denmark	1–1	1–5	UEFA Women's Euro 2009 qualifying
6.	5 March 2008	Faro, Portugal	Republic of Ireland	1–0	2–0	2008 Algarve Cup
7.	7 March 2008	Faro, Portugal	Poland	2–1	3–1	2008 Algarve Cup
8.	12 March 2008	Albufeira, Portugal	China	1–1	1–1 (5–4 p)	2008 Algarve Cup
9.	3 May 2008	Póvoa de Varzim, Portugal	Scotland	1–4	1–4	UEFA Women's Euro 2009 qualifying
10.	27 September 2008	Chernihiv, Ukraine	Ukraine	1–1	1–1	UEFA Women's Euro 2009 qualifying
11.	4 March 2009	Albufeira, Portugal	Poland	2–1	2–1	2009 Algarve Cup
12.	6 March 2009	Albufeira, Portugal	Wales	1–0	2–1	2009 Algarve Cup
13.	21 November 2009	Nova Gorica, Slovenia	Slovenia	4–0	4–0	2011 FIFA Women's World Cup qualification
14.	24 February 2010	Parchal, Portugal	Faroe Islands	3–0	5–0	2010 Algarve Cup
15.	24 February 2010	Parchal, Portugal	Faroe Islands	4–0	5–0	2010 Algarve Cup
16.	24 February 2010	Parchal, Portugal	Faroe Islands	5–0	5–0	2010 Algarve Cup
17.	31 March 2010	Tocha, Portugal	Armenia	1–0	7–0	2011 FIFA Women's World Cup qualification
18.	31 March 2010	Tocha, Portugal	Armenia	6–0	7–0	2011 FIFA Women's World Cup qualification
19.	31 March 2010	Tocha, Portugal	Armenia	7–0	7–0	2011 FIFA Women's World Cup qualification
20.	19 June 2010	Vantaa, Finland	Finland	1–0	1–4	2011 FIFA Women's World Cup qualification
21.	2 March 2011	Vila Real de Santo António, Portugal	Wales	2–0	3–1	2011 Algarve Cup
22.	7 March 2011	Parchal, Portugal	Romania	1–0	1–1	2011 Algarve Cup
23.	9 March 2011	Loulé, Portugal	Finland	1–0	2–1	2011 Algarve Cup
24.	17 September 2011	Yerevan, Armenia	Armenia	3–0	8–0	UEFA Women's Euro 2013 qualifying
25.	17 September 2011	Yerevan, Armenia	Armenia	4–0	8–0	UEFA Women's Euro 2013 qualifying
26.	16 December 2012	São Paulo, Brazil	Mexico	1–0	1–0	2012 International Women's Football Tournament
27.	6 March 2013	Vila Real de Santo António, Portugal	Wales	1–0	2–0	2013 Algarve Cup
28.	6 March 2013	Vila Real de Santo António, Portugal	Wales	2–0	2–0	2013 Algarve Cup
29.	26 September 2013	Fyli, Greece	Greece	4–1	5–1	2015 FIFA Women's World Cup qualification
30.	26 November 2015	Estoril, Portugal	Montenegro	6–1	6–1	UEFA Women's Euro 2017 qualifying
31.	3 June 2016	Petrovac, Montenegro	Montenegro	1–0	3–0	UEFA Women's Euro 2017 qualifying
32.	3 June 2016	Petrovac, Montenegro	Montenegro	2–0	3–0	UEFA Women's Euro 2017 qualifying
33.	3 June 2016	Petrovac, Montenegro	Montenegro	3–0	3–0	UEFA Women's Euro 2017 qualifying
