= Solange Carvalhas =

Portuguese association football player

Personal information
- Full name: Solange Rodrigues Carvalhas
- Date of birth: 22 May 1992 (age 34)
- Place of birth: Lisbon, Portugal
- Height: 1.58 m (5 ft 2 in)
- Position: Midfielder

Team information
- Current team: Sporting CP

Solange Carvalhas (born 22 April 1992) is a Portuguese footballer.
