= Nora Stapleton =

Ireland international rugby union player

- Born: Nora Stapleton; 5 July 1983 (age 43) County Donegal, Ireland
- Height: 1.72 m (5 ft 8 in)
- Weight: 69 kg (152 lb)
- University: University College Dublin

Rugby union career
- Position: Flyhalf / Out-half
Senior career
Years	Team	Apps	(Points)
2007–	Old Belvedere		
2017–	Barbarians		
Provincial / State sides
Years	Team	Apps	(Points)
2009–	Leinster		
International career
Years	Team	Apps	(Points)
2010–2017	Ireland	50	

Nora Stapleton is a former Ireland women's rugby union international. Stapleton represented Ireland at the 2010, 2014 and 2017 Women's Rugby World Cups. She was also a member of the Ireland teams that won the 2013 and 2015 Women's Six Nations Championships. Stapleton was a member of the first Ireland teams to defeat both England and New Zealand. Stapleton has also played two other football codes at a senior level. As a women's association football player, she played for UCD in FAI Women's Cup finals and UEFA Women's Cup campaigns. She has also played senior ladies' Gaelic football for Donegal.

== Early years and education ==
Stapleton grew up in Fahan, near Buncrana, in Inishowen, County Donegal. She was educated at St Mura's NS in Tooban and Crana College in Buncrana. Between 2001 and 2004 Stapleton attended University College Dublin where she gained a BSc. She studied sports management, financial management, leisure management, theory of coaching, physiology and organisational management.

== Association football ==
Stapleton attended UCD on a soccer scholarship and played as a defender for the women's football team. Together with Sylvia Gee, Mary Waldron and Caroline Thorpe, she was a prominent member of the UCD team that won three successive FAI Women's Cup finals between 2002 and 2004. After winning the FAI Women's Cup, UCD qualified for the UEFA Women's Cup and Stapleton subsequently played in their 2003–04, 2004–05 and 2005–06 campaigns. She also helped UCD complete a four-in-a-row of Dublin Women's Soccer League titles between 2003 and 2006.

== Ladies' Gaelic football ==
Nora Stapleton
Sport
- Sport: Ladies' Gaelic football
- Position: Midfielder
Clubs
- Years: Club
- 199x– 2001–2004 200x–: Naomh Padraig (Muff); UCD; Na Fianna
Inter-county
- Years: County
- 200x–201x: Donegal

=== Clubs ===
Stapleton played ladies' Gaelic football at club level for Naomh Padraig, UCD and Na Fianna.

=== Inter-County ===
Stapleton played for Donegal at senior inter-county level. In June 2008 she was named Player of the Month after helping Donegal defeat Armagh, the reigning champions, in the first round of the Ulster Senior Ladies' Football Championship. On 26 September 2010, Stapleton helped Donegal win the 2010 All-Ireland Intermediate Ladies' Football Championship. In the final Donegal played a Waterford team that included Stapleton's Ireland women's rugby union international teammate, Niamh Briggs. Between 2007 and 2013 Stapleton also worked for Ballinteer St John's GAA/Dublin GAA as a Gaelic games promotional officer.

== Rugby union ==
=== Old Belvedere ===
Stapleton did not start playing women's rugby union until she was 24. She was working for the Bank of Ireland in Dublin in 2007 when she was invited to play in a tag rugby social event. This subsequently led to an invitation to try out for Old Belvedere. Stapleton was a member of Old Belvedere women's team that won three consecutive All Ireland Division One titles between 2013 and 2015. Stapleton captained the team in the 2015 final and scored nine points, a try and two conversations, as Old Belvedere defeated UL Bohemians 19–17 at Donnybrook Stadium.

=== Leinster ===
Stapleton has played for Leinster in the IRFU Women's Interprovincial Series. She was first called up to the Leinster squad in 2009.

=== Barbarians ===
On 10 November 2017 Stapleton came on as a replacement for the Barbarians against Munster in the invitational team's first women's match. Stapleton provided the assist for Georgina Roberts to score the crucial third try as the Barbarians won 19–0. In March 2018 Stapleton also played for the Barbarians against a British Army XV.

=== Ireland international ===
Between 2010 and 2017 Stapleton made 50 appearances for Ireland. She made her debut for Ireland against Italy on 5 February 2010. Stapleton represented Ireland at the 2010, 2014 and 2017 Women's Rugby World Cups. At the 2014 tournament she was a member of the Ireland team that defeated New Zealand. She was also a member of the Ireland teams that won the 2013 and 2015 Women's Six Nations Championships. During the 2013 championship Stapleton was a member of the first Ireland team to defeat England. On 26 August 2017 Stapleton made her 50th and final appearance for Ireland against Wales during 2017 Women's Rugby World Cup. Since 2013 Stapleton has also worked for the IRFU as a women and girls development manager.

== Honours ==
=== Rugby union ===
Ireland

- Women's Six Nations Championship
  - Winners: 2013, 2015: 2
- Grand Slam
  - Winners: 2013
- Triple Crown
  - Winners: 2013, 2015

Leinster

- IRFU Women's Interprovincial Series
  - Winners: 2013, 2016: 2

Old Belvedere

- All Ireland Division One
  - Winners: 2013, 2014, 2015 : 3

Individual

- Women's All Ireland Player's Player of the Year Award
  - 2018

=== Association football ===
UCD

- FAI Women's Cup
  - Winners: 2002, 2003, 2004 : 3
- Dublin Women's Soccer League
  - Winners: 2003, 2004, 2005, 2006: 4
- DWSL Premier Cup
  - Winners: 2004, 2005, 2007: 3

=== Gaelic football ===
Donegal

- All-Ireland Intermediate Ladies' Football Championship
  - Winner: 2010

Individual

- Ladies Player of the Month Award
  - June 2008
