= 2003 Dublin Women's Soccer League =

Dublin Women's Soccer League
- Season: 2003
- Champions: UCD
- Matches played: 55
- Goals scored: 249 (4.53 per match)
- Biggest home win: 25 May; Benfica 10–0 Bank of Ireland
- Biggest away win: 30 July; Rathfarnham United 0–8 UCD
- Highest scoring: 25 May; Benfica 10–0 Bank of Ireland; 1 September; Rathfarnham United 5-5 Bank of Ireland

The 2003 Dublin Women's Soccer League was the 10th season of the women's association football league featuring teams mainly from the Greater Dublin Area. The season began on 27 April and concluded on 28 September. UCD won their first DWSL title, the first of four successive league titles. They also completed a double after winning the 2003 FAI Women's Cup. In October 2003, with a team that included Grace Murray, Dundalk City won the DWSL Premier Cup, beating a St James's Gate team featuring Katie Taylor. City defeated Gate in the final 3–2 after extra time. The final was played at the home of Bluebell United and City were presented with the trophy by future Republic of Ireland women's national football team manager Susan Ronan.

== Final table ==
Pos	Team	Pld	W	D	L	GF	GA	GD	Pts
1	UCD (C)	14	11	3	0	55	13	+42	36
2	Shamrock Rovers	14	11	2	1	52	20	+32	35
3	Benfica	13	7	2	4	38	21	+17	23
4	Dundalk City	14	6	2	6	17	36	−19	20
5	St Catherine's	14	5	0	9	22	37	−15	15
6	Peamount United	13	3	2	8	20	29	−9	11
7	Rathfarnham United	14	2	5	7	24	43	−19	11
8	Bank of Ireland	14	1	2	11	21	50	−29	5

(C) Champions

== Matches ==
Home \ Away	BOI	BEN	DUN	PEA	RTH	SHA	STC	UCD
Bank of Ireland		0–5	1–1	0–3	1–3	2–4	3–0	1–5
Benfica	10–0		2–0	n/a (Note: Benfica v Peamount United not played)	2–0	2–2	2–0	1–1
Dundalk City	2–1	2–5		2–0	3–3	1–5	1–0	1–5
Peamount United	3–3	4–0	0–2		2–2	1–4	1–3	0–5
Rathfarnham United	5–5	0–3	0–0	1–4		0–5	2–3	0–8
Shamrock Rovers	3–2	3–1	9–0	3–1	2–0		5–1	2–5
St Catherine's	3–2	4–3	0–1	3–1	3–6	1–2		0–5
UCD	2–0	5–2	5–0	1–0	2–2	3–3	3–1	

Legend: Blue = home team win; Yellow = draw; Red = away team win.
