= 2010 FAI Women's Cup final =

- Event: 2010 FAI Women's Cup
Peamount United	Salthill Devon
4	2
- Date: 25 July 2010
- Venue: Tolka Park, Dublin
- Player of the Match: Áine O'Gorman
- Referee: Rhona Daly (Limerick)

The 2010 FAI Women's Cup final, known as the 2010 FAI Umbro Women's Cup final for sponsorship reasons, was the final match of the 2010 FAI Women's Cup, the national association women's football cup of the Republic of Ireland. The match took place on Sunday 25 July 2010 at Tolka Park in Dublin, between Peamount United and Salthill Devon.

Peamount United won the game 4–2 thanks to an Áine O'Gorman hat-trick. Peamount won the cup first time in their history, having twice been losing finalists.

== Background ==
Peamount United had won the Dublin Women's Soccer League and the DWSL Premier Cup that season. They also came in to the game having lost the 2005 final 0–1 to Dundalk City, and having lost the 2008 final 1–2 to St Francis as a result of an injury time penalty.

Salthill came into the game with it being the first national final that a senior side at the club had ever made it to. Whilst the club had never made it to a final, many of the players featured in the Galway Ladies League team that won the cup in 2007.

=== Route to the final ===
Peamount United		Round	Salthill Devon	
Opponent	Score	Round	Opponent	Score
Raheny United	3–2 (H)	First round	DWSL	w/o
Cork Women's League	3–1 (H)	Second round	Aisling Annacotty	2–0 (A)
FYFC	(H)	Quarter-finals	St Catherine's	4–0 (H)
Mayo Women's League	3–0 (A)	Semi-finals	Kilmacrennan Celtic	3–1 (A)
Note: In all results above, the score of the finalist is given first (H: home; A: away).

== Match ==
=== Details ===
25 July 2010

Peamount United	4–2	Salthill Devon
Comerford 13'; O'Gorman 36', 67', 80'	Report	Hannon 11'; Critchley 30'

Tolka Park, Dublin
Referee: Rhona Daly

GK	(Republic of Ireland) Linda Meehan
DF	(Republic of Ireland) Nicola Sinnott
DF	(Republic of Ireland) Stacey McGlone
DF	(Republic of Ireland) Jennifer Murphy
DF	(Republic of Ireland) Susan Byrne
MF	(Republic of Ireland) Karina Kelly	(substituted off) 65'
MF	(Republic of Ireland) Rachel Jenkins
MF	(Republic of Ireland) Susan Hackett
MF	(Republic of Ireland) Wendy McGlone
FW	(Republic of Ireland) Áine O'Gorman
FW	(Republic of Ireland) Ruth Comerford
Substitutes:
GK	(Republic of Ireland) Michelle Byrne
DF	(Republic of Ireland) Emma Donohoe
DF	(Republic of Ireland) Louise Quinn (c)
MF	(Republic of Ireland) Siobhan Fitzgerald
MF	(Republic of Ireland) Katie Taylor
FW	(Republic of Ireland) Claire Kinsella
FW	(Republic of Ireland) Sara Lawlor	(substituted on) 65'
Manager:
(Republic of Ireland) Eileen Gleeson

GK	(Republic of Ireland) Tina Hughes
DF	(Republic of Ireland) Deirdre Connell	(substituted off) 75'
DF	(Republic of Ireland) Aine Hannon
DF	(Republic of Ireland) Emer Flatley
DF	(Republic of Ireland) Becky Walsh
MF	(Republic of Ireland) Ruth Fahy (c)
MF	(Republic of Ireland) Jenny Critchley	(substituted off) 88'
MF	(Republic of Ireland) Tessa Mullins	(substituted off) 69'
FW	(Republic of Ireland) Kara Mullins
FW	(Republic of Ireland) Lucy Hannon
FW	(Republic of Ireland) Julie-Ann Russell
Substitutes:
GK	(Republic of Ireland) Laoise O'Driscoll
DF	(Republic of Ireland) Caroline Carter
DF	(Republic of Ireland) Annette Clarke	(substituted on) 75'
DF	(Republic of Ireland) Sarah O'Connell
MF	(Republic of Ireland) Lauren Ashmore	(substituted on) 88'
MF	(Republic of Ireland) Dora Gorman
FW	(Republic of Ireland) Rebecca McPhilbin	(substituted on) 69'
Manager:
(Republic of Ireland) Kieran O’Mahony
