= 2005 Dublin Women's Soccer League =

Dublin Women's Soccer League
- Season: 2005
- Champions: UCD

The 2005 Dublin Women's Soccer League was the 12th season of the women's association football league featuring teams mainly from the Greater Dublin Area. Newly promoted Dublin City University lost all twelve games. This included a 13–0 away defeat against Dundalk City in a game which saw Sonia Hoey score ten goals. Debutant Paula Murray also added a hat-trick. UCD won the title for a third successive season. They also completed a league double after defeating Dundalk City 2–0 in the DWSL Premier Cup final at the AUL Complex. The winning UCD team included Sylvia Gee. Dundalk City won the 2005 FAI Women's Cup, defeating a Peamount United team featuring Katie Taylor 1-0 in the final at Lansdowne Road. Sonia Hoey scored the winner in the 16th minute.

== Final table ==
Pos	Team	Pld	W	D	L	GF	GA	GD	Pts
1	UCD (C)	12	9	2	1	57	11	+46	29
2	Peamount United	12	9	1	2	52	16	+36	28
3	Dundalk City	12	9	1	2	39	7	+32	28
4	Shamrock Rovers	12	4	2	6	19	21	−2	14
5	Templeogue	12	4	1	7	20	48	−28	13
6	Benfica	12	3	1	8	13	44	−31	10
7	Dublin City University (R)	12	0	0	12	5	58	−53	0

(C) Champions; (R) Relegated

== DWSL Premier Cup ==
=== Round 1 ===
22 June	Dublin Bus	14–0	Newbridge Town

22 June	Bray Wanderers	4–1	AIB

22 June	UCD	5–0	Templeogue

22 June	Shamrock Rovers	2–0	Sporting Kilmore

=== Round 2 ===
13 July	UCD	2–0	Dublin City University

13 July	Shamrock Rovers	0–5	Peamount United

13 July	St Catherine's	7–1	ALSAA

13 July	Bray Wanderers	1–0	Skerries Town

13 July	Dublin Bus	1–3	Leixlip United

13 July	Raheny United	2–0	Dublin City

13 July	Greenpark	2–4	Dundalk City

=== Quarterfinals ===
10 August	Raheny United	6–1	St Catherine's

10 August	Leixlip United	1–2	Dundalk City

10 August	Bank of Ireland	1–4	Peamount United

19 August	UCD	14–0	Bray Wanderers

=== Semi-finals ===
24 August	Peamount United	0–1	Dundalk City

26 August	Raheny United	1–2	UCD

=== Final ===
16 October	UCD	2–0	Dundalk City	AUL Complex
	Lorraine O'Sullivan; Sharon Cullen
