= 2008 Dublin Women's Soccer League =

Dublin Women's Soccer League
- Season: 2008
- Champions: St Francis

The 2008 Dublin Women's Soccer League was the 15th season of the women's association football league featuring teams from the Greater Dublin Area. With a team that included Mary Waldron and Grainne Kierans, St Francis finished as champions. They also won the 2008 FAI Women's Cup, defeating Peamount United 2–1 in the final at Richmond Park.

== Final tables ==
=== Premier League A ===
Pos	Team	Pld	W	D	L	GF	GA	GD	Pts
1	St Francis (C)	13	12	1	0	62	6	+56	37
2	St Catherines	12	9	1	2	27	16	+11	28
3	Drogheda United	14	9	0	5	36	20	+16	27
4	Greenpark A	14	6	2	6	27	27	0	20
5	Leixlip United	13	4	2	7	25	31	−6	14
6	Cabinteely	13	4	1	8	22	39	−17	13
7	Bray Wanderers	14	3	1	10	18	52	−34	10
8	Beggsboro	13	0	4	9	11	37	−26	4

(C) Champions

=== Premier League B ===
Pos	Team	Pld	W	D	L	GF	GA	GD	Pts
1	Raheny United (C)	10	8	1	1	29	12	+17	25
2	Dundalk City	10	5	2	3	21	15	+6	17
3	Stella Maris	9	5	1	3	25	14	+11	16
4	Peamount United	10	3	3	4	19	20	−1	12
5	Templeogue	11	2	1	8	12	38	−26	7 (Note: Unclear why Templeogue played 11 matches)
6	Dundalk	8	2	0	6	11	18	−7	6

(C) Champions
