= 2006 Dublin Women's Soccer League =

Dublin Women's Soccer League
- Season: 2006
- Champions: UCD
- Biggest home win: 30 August; UCD 9–0 Dundalk
- Biggest away win: 26 June; Templeogue 0–10 Raheny United
- Highest scoring: 13 August; Benfica 3–8 Raheny United; 13 August; Dundalk 3-8 Templeogue

The 2006 Dublin Women's Soccer League was the 13th season of the women's association football league featuring teams from the Greater Dublin Area. The season began on 14 May and concluded on 30 August. UCD won the title for the fourth successive season.

== Final table ==
Pos	Team	Pld	W	D	L	GF	GA	GD	Pts
1	UCD (C)	11	10	0	1	52	4	+48	30
2	Peamount United	12	7	1	4	26	19	+7	22
3	Raheny United	10	6	2	2	41	12	+29	20
4	Benfica	9	4	1	4	23	19	+4	13
5	Dundalk W.F.C.	11	2	2	7	11	40	−29	8
6	St Catherines	11	1	4	6	10	29	−19	7
7	Templeogue	12	1	4	7	19	59	−40	7

(C) Champions

== Matches ==
Home \ Away	BEN	DUN	PEA	RAH	STC	TEM	UCD
Benfica		0–1	0–1	3–8	n/a	8–1	0–5
Dundalk W.F.C.	0–5		0–3	n/a	1–1	3–8	0–5
Peamount United	2–3	3–2		n/a	1–0	7–1	1–0
Raheny United	n/a	3–0	5–0		4–0	2–2	1–2
St Catherine's	1–1	1–2	4–3	0–5		n/a	0–7
Templeogue	0–3	2–2	2–4	0–10	1–1		n/a
UCD	n/a	9–0	1–0	4–2	2–0	8–0	

Source: (Note: Several league fixtures were not completed while scores from others are missing)
Legend: Blue = home team win; Yellow = draw; Red = away team win.
