= Louise Quinn =

Irish footballer (born 1990)

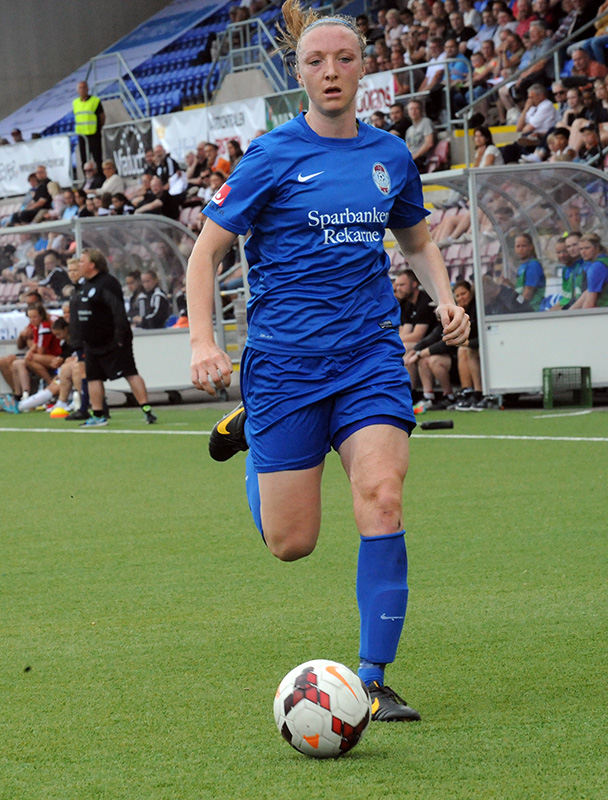
- Quinn with Eskilstuna United in 2014

Personal information
- Full name: Louise Catherine Quinn
- Date of birth: 17 June 1990 (age 36)
- Place of birth: Blessington, Ireland
- Height: 6 ft 0 in (1.83 m)
- Position: Centre back

Youth career
- Blessington Boys FC
- Lakeside FC

Senior career*
Years	Team	Apps	(Gls)
2004–2012	Peamount United		
2010	→ UCD		
2013–2016	Eskilstuna United	90	(13)
2017	Notts County	0	(0)
2017–2020	Arsenal	46	(5)
2020–2021	Fiorentina	20	(3)
2021–2025	Birmingham City	66	(13)

International career^{‡}
2008–2025	Republic of Ireland	121	(12)
- * Club domestic league appearances and goals as of 23:47 31 January 2025 (UTC) ‡ National team caps and goals as of 23:47 31 January 2025 (UTC)

Louise Catherine Quinn (born 17 June 1990) is an Irish former professional footballer who played as a centre back.

At club level Quinn began her senior career with Peamount United, captaining the club to the inaugural 2011–12 Women's National League title and featuring in the UEFA Women's Champions League. She spent four seasons in Sweden with Eskilstuna United from 2013 to 2016, then moved to England with Notts County who folded shortly afterwards. After joining Arsenal on an initial short-term contract in May 2017, she extended her terms and helped the North London club recapture the FA WSL title in 2018–19. Following her departure from Arsenal in 2020, Quinn spent 2020–21 with the Italian Serie A club Fiorentina Women, before joining Birmingham City in July 2021.

After winning her first senior cap in February 2008, Quinn has made over 105 appearances for the Republic of Ireland national team. She has been named the FAI Senior Women's International Player of the Year on two occasions, in 2013 and 2019.

== Early life ==
Louise Quinn was born and raised in Blessington, County Wicklow, the daughter of Jacinta and Pat Quinn. She has two older sisters, Vivienne and Sinead.

=== Gaelic football ===
Her father had played Gaelic football for Wicklow GAA and Louise joined Blessington GAA, playing in the adult team as a 12-year-old goalkeeper. After a break from Gaelic football, Quinn returned to playing with Kilcullen GAA at around 18 or 19 years old, alongside her best friend and Peamount United team-mate Jenny Murphy. Although Quinn was subsequently called into training camps with the Kildare GAA team, she wanted to stay loyal to Wicklow.

== Club career ==
Quinn began playing organised soccer with Blessington Boys' at under-6 level, alongside her friend Derek Balfe and his father Vincent, who coached the team. Quinn then played girls' football with Lakeside FC of Wicklow before joining County Dublin club Peamount United in 2004.

When Eileen Gleeson took over as Peamount United coach in 2006, she noticed Quinn's potential and appointed her to the club captaincy at 16 years old. Quinn captained Peamount to the 2008 FAI Women's Cup final at Richmond Park, where they lost 2–1 to St Francis. In 2010 Peamount won the FAI Cup final, after defeating Salthill Devon 4–2. Quinn missed the occasion as she was on a work placement in the United States.

In August 2011, Quinn scored a hat-trick against ŽNK Krka, as Peamount won 7–0 in the UEFA Women's Champions League qualifying round in Slovenia. In the inaugural 2011–12 Women's National League season, Quinn helped Peamount United secure the League title and was named in the Team of the Season. After playing in Peamount's Champions League last-32 elimination by Paris Saint-Germain Féminine in September and October 2011, Quinn began to consider playing professionally overseas: "It was then that I started to think: 'Could I go abroad? Would I be good enough?'"

Quinn moved to Swedish club Eskilstuna United in January 2013. She proved a success in Sweden as Eskilstuna were promoted from the Elitettan in her first season and finished seventh in the top-level Damallsvenskan in her second. In 2015, the team finished runners-up to FC Rosengård and coach Viktor Eriksson described Quinn as one of the best defenders in the league. In 2016 team captain Quinn was ever present in the league and played in the club's UEFA Women's Champions League campaign, but decided to leave Eskilstuna in November 2016.

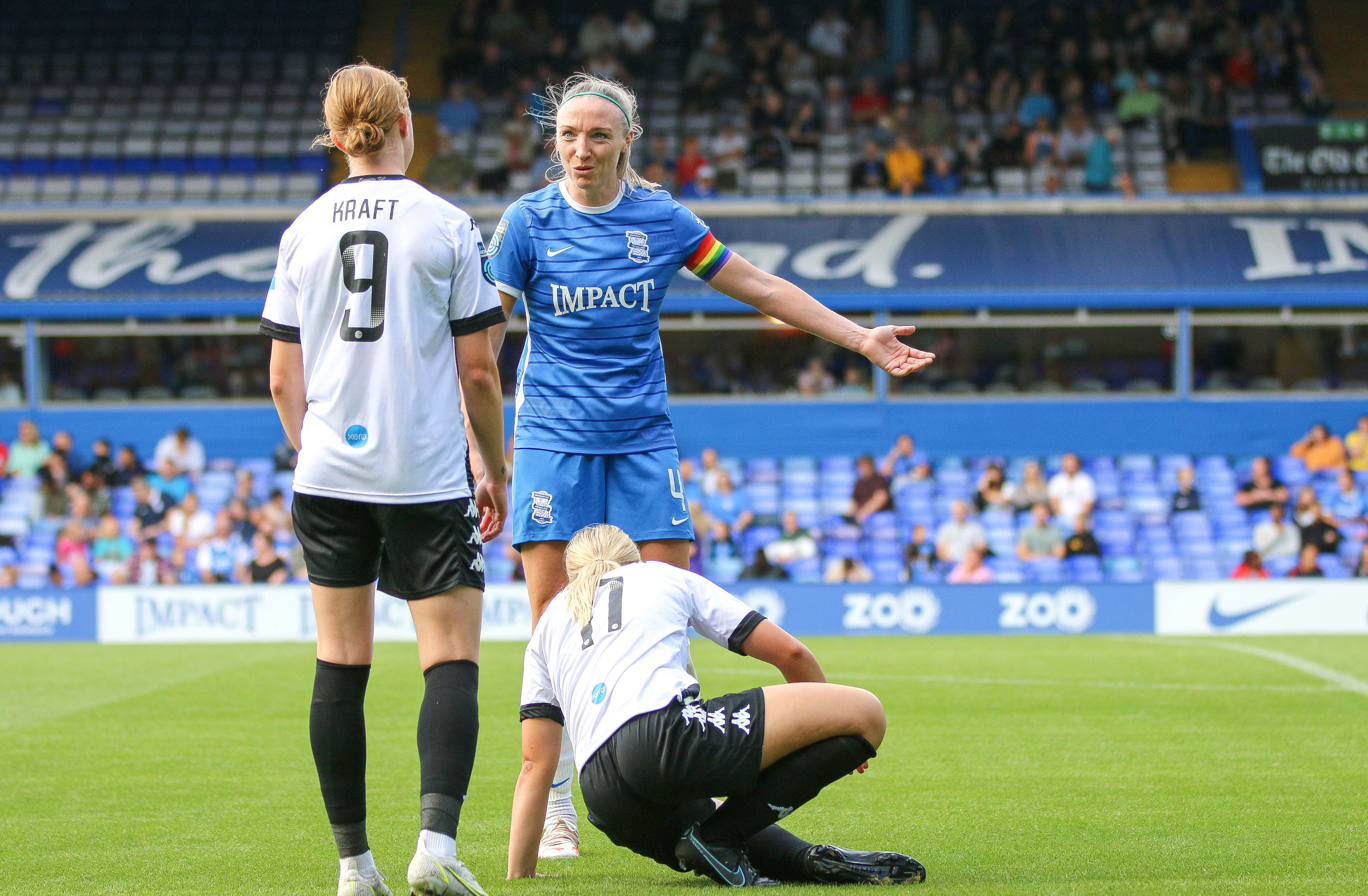
Quinn (4) captaining Birmingham City in 2022

In February 2017 Quinn signed for Notts County, only for the club to fold in April just before the start of the FA WSL Spring Series season. Quinn signed a short-term deal with Arsenal of the FA WSL on 3 May 2017. She signed a new contract in May 2019. With Arsenal Quinn was an important player in the team which won the 2018 FA WSL Cup Final and 2018–19 FA WSL, but played less regularly in 2019–20 and was given a free transfer on the expiry of her contract in June 2020.

Fiorentina Women of the Italian Serie A signed Quinn to a one-year contract with a one-year option in July 2020. After a 2020–21 season in which Fiorentina finished fourth in the League and were beaten 2–0 by Juventus in the Supercoppa Italiana final, Quinn declined her one-year option and decided to leave the club.

Instead Quinn accepted a two-year contract with Birmingham City. She was immediately appointed the club captain, and debuted in a 1–0 defeat by Tottenham Hotspur on the opening day of the season. Birmingham signed several other Irish players and by January 2022 Quinn was one of seven in the City squad.

Despite Quinn's fine individual form, which saw her finish as the team's top goalscorer with five goals and be named FA WSL "Signing of the Season" by The Guardian, Birmingham City finished at the bottom of the table and were relegated at the end of the 2021–22 FA WSL campaign. As Quinn had a relegation release clause in her contract she sought assurances from the club about promised improvements to their training facilities before deciding whether to stay on.

Ultimately Quinn decided to remain with Birmingham City in the second tier, explaining that she enjoyed the club's Irish connections and working under coaches Darren Carter and Jo Potter.

== International career ==
=== Youth ===
Quinn captained the Ireland women's national football team at under-19 level, making a total of 25 appearances to add to her five caps for Ireland under-17s. She had been called into the national under-17 team as a precocious 14-year-old, but the following year her progress was temporarily derailed by a hip fracture which took 10 months to heal.

=== Senior ===
Quinn made her senior bow in February 2008, as a last-minute substitute for Niamh Fahey in a 4–1 friendly win over Poland at John Hyland Park in Baldonnel, County Dublin. In October 2008 Quinn was named in a 22-player squad for the UEFA Women's Euro 2009 qualifying play-off against Iceland, described by Ireland's manager Noel King as: "without doubt, the biggest game in the history of women's football in Ireland."

In February 2009 Quinn won a second cap after making another substitute appearance, in a 2–0 friendly defeat by France. After securing a regular position in the centre of Ireland's defence, Quinn was named the FAI Senior Women's International Player of the Year in 2013.

Quinn continued to be selected by national team coach Susan Ronan and participated in Ireland's failed 2015 FIFA Women's World Cup qualification campaign. On 5 April 2014 in a fixture against Germany at Tallaght Stadium, Quinn's header from Megan Campbell's long throw-in secured a 1–0 lead at half-time. This was the first goal the Germans had conceded in the series, but Ireland lost 3–2 when Melanie Leupolz scored an injury time winner.

Under Ronan's successor Colin Bell, Quinn maintained her national team place. She played in Bell's first game in charge, a 2–0 win over the Czech Republic at the 2017 Cyprus Cup on 1 March 2017. The following month, Quinn was among a delegation of 13 players who secured substantially improved working conditions for Ireland's female national team players, following a protracted dispute with the Football Association of Ireland. After breaking her nose in a 2–0 defeat by Norway in Tallaght, she wore a protective face mask to play in a 1–0 defeat by the same opponents four days later which eliminated Ireland from 2019 FIFA Women's World Cup qualification.

In 2019 Quinn won the FAI Senior Women's International Player of the Year for a second time, after playing in all of Ireland's games during the calendar year. She expressed disappointment and frustration when Colin Bell resigned from his coaching role in June 2019.

Quinn continued to be an important player for Ireland under Vera Pauw in the UEFA Women's Euro 2022 qualifying Group I and 2023 FIFA Women's World Cup qualification – UEFA Group A campaigns. Her winning goal in a 3–2 friendly victory over Australia on 21 September 2021 at Tallaght Stadium arrested a seven-match losing run stretching over 18 months.

In September 2022 she declared that Ireland had shed their "Spursy" label, after much improved results secured the team's place in the 2023 FIFA Women's World Cup qualification – UEFA play-offs.

== Retirement ==
Having not played since October 2024 due to a hip injury, Quinn announced her retirement from professional football on 29 April 2025.

== Style of play ==
Quinn is a commanding central defender, described as "towering" and "a rock". She is particularly dominant in the air: "most of what I do in football involves heading the ball". After scoring a typical headed goal against Australia in June 2022, Player of the Match Quinn jokingly referred to it as "the auld trademark".

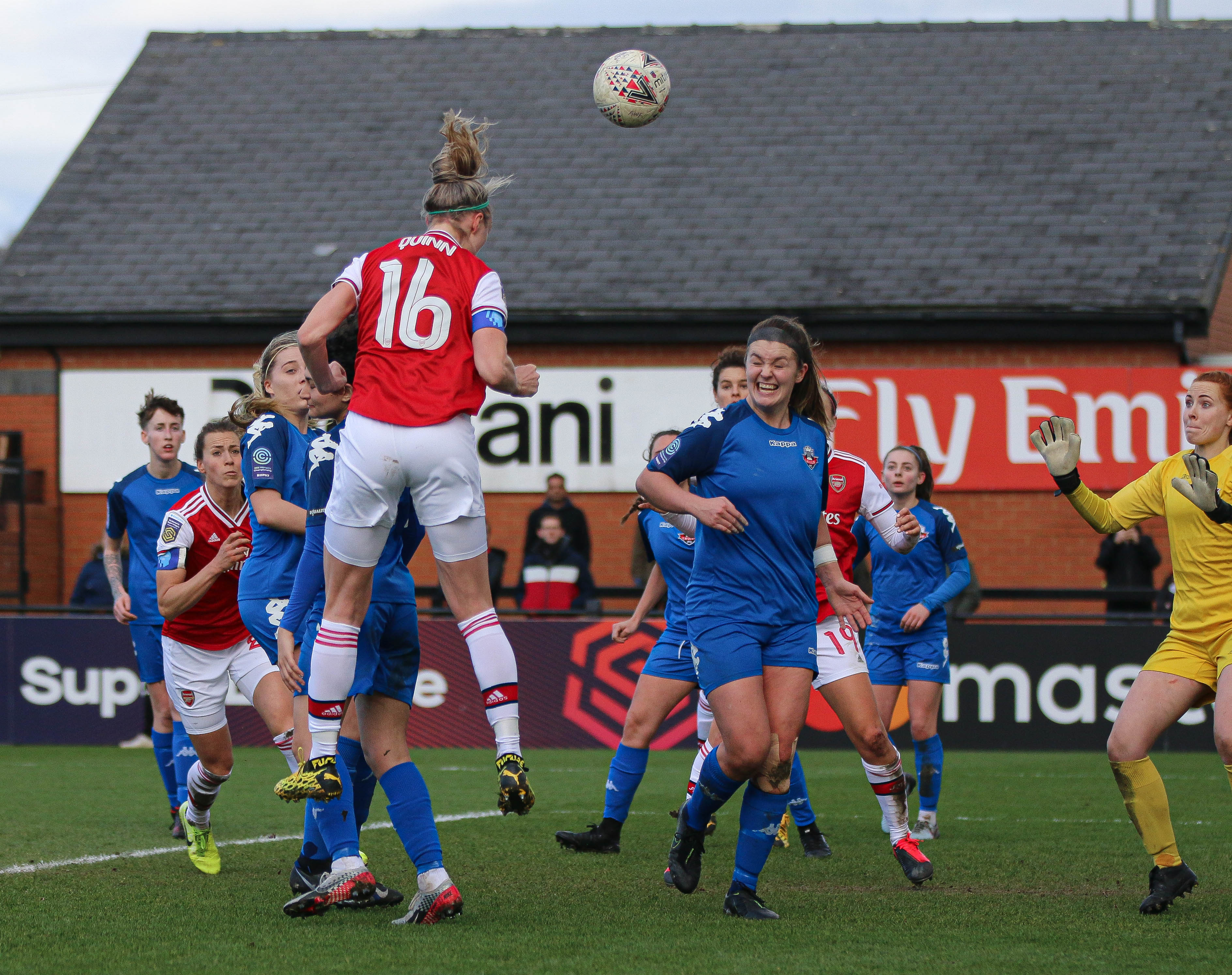
Quinn (16) heads for goal while playing for Arsenal against Lewes

Having become known as a strong, unshowy defender, Quinn developed other aspects of her game while playing for Arsenal: "There, I changed the sort of player that I was. I'm generally a real centre-back – tough, I love big tackles, get the ball as far away from goal as possible, literally do whatever it takes. But now you see that centre-backs are changing. It's more modern, you've got to be a ball-playing centre-back and I learned that at Arsenal. I learned to pass the ball around my own box and to play out of tight situations. I completely developed a new way of football, and to do that at 27, 28 and 29 – I loved it."

Also renowned for her leadership qualities, Quinn's Birmingham City manager Scott Booth said of her: "I just know how much of a leader she is. She stands out, because of her physique [height], she's head and shoulders above the rest, she's a complete leader." Ireland manager Vera Pauw likened Quinn to a tiger for her fighting qualities.

== Personal life ==
After attending Newbridge College, Quinn was awarded a Football Association of Ireland scholarship to University College Dublin, from which she graduated with a degree in Sports and Exercise Management. She also represented Irish Universities at the World University Games, playing in the 2009 tournament in Belgrade.

Quinn has a form of dyslexia which hindered her learning Swedish and Italian during her stays in those countries. Her condition also made her exempt from mandatory Irish language classes at school, although patriotism led her to continue the subject and gain a pass mark at Leaving Cert level.

Quinn is in a relationship with Eilish O’Gara. The couple live in Birmingham.

She has worked for Raidió Teilifís Éireann as a television pundit, including at the 2018 FIFA World Cup, and the 2019 FIFA Women's World Cup.

== Career statistics ==
Appearances and goals by national team and year
National team	Year	Apps	Goals
Republic of Ireland	2008	1	0
Republic of Ireland	2009	1	0
Republic of Ireland	2011	4	0
Republic of Ireland	2012	11	1
Republic of Ireland	2013	6	1
Republic of Ireland	2014	11	2
Republic of Ireland	2015	7	1
Republic of Ireland	2016	10	3
Republic of Ireland	2017	10	0
Republic of Ireland	2018	8	1
Republic of Ireland	2019	8	1
Republic of Ireland	2020	5	0
Republic of Ireland	2021	9	1
Republic of Ireland	2022	9	4
Republic of Ireland	2023	3	0
Total		103	15

Scores and results list Republic of Ireland's goals first. Score column indicates score after each Quinn goal. Updated as of 5 May 2023.

International goals scored by Louise Quinn
No.	Cap	Date	Venue	Opponent	Score	Result	Competition	Ref.
1	8	5 March 2012	Estádio Algarve, Faro	Portugal	1-1	1–2	2012 Algarve Cup	
2	18	6 March 2013	Tasos Markou, Paralimni	Northern Ireland	2–0	5–1	2013 Cyprus Cup	
3	25	7 March 2014	Tasos Markou, Paralimni	South Korea	1–0	1-1	2014 Cyprus Cup	
4	28	5 April 2014	Tallaght Stadium, Dublin	Germany	1–0	2–3	2015 FIFA Women's World Cup Qual.	
5	40	27 October 2015	Parque de Jogos Comendador Joaquim de Almeida Freitas, Moreira de Cónegos	Portugal	1-1	2–1	2017 UEFA Women's Championship Qual.	
6	46	9 March 2016	Tasos Markou, Paralimni	Finland	2–0	2–0	2016 Cyprus Cup	
7	47	7 April 2016	Stadion pod Malim brdom, Petrovac	Montenegro	1–0	5-0	2017 UEFA Women's Championship Qual.	
8	50	7 June 2016	Tallaght Stadium, Dublin	Montenegro	6–0	9-0	2017 UEFA Women's Championship Qual.	
9	63	21 January 2018	Estádio de São Miguel, The Azores	Portugal	3–0	3–1	Friendly	
10	72	5 March 2019	Estadio Municipal de Marbella, Marbella	Wales	1–0	1–0	Friendly	
11	87	21 September 2021	Tallaght Stadium, Dublin	Australia	3–2	3–2	Friendly	
12	92	16 February 2022	La Manga Club Football Stadium, La Manga	Poland	1-1	2–1	2022 Pinatar Cup	
13	96	27 June 2022	Tengiz Burjanadze Stadium, Gori	Georgia	5-0	9-0	2023 FIFA Women's World Cup Qual.	
14	96	27 June 2022	Tengiz Burjanadze Stadium, Gori	Georgia	6–0	9-0	2023 FIFA Women's World Cup Qual.	
15	100	14 November 2022	Estadio Municipal de Marbella, Marbella	Morocco	3–0	4–0	Friendly	
