= Grace Murray =

Irish footballer

Personal information
- Date of birth: 26 May 1989 (age 37)
- Height: 1.78 m (5 ft 10 in)
- Position: Defender

Team information
- Current team: Shelbourne Ladies

Youth career
- St Dominic's Boys FC
- Dundalk City

Senior career*
Years	Team	Apps	(Gls)
- Dundalk City
- St Francis
2011–2013	Peamount United		
2014–2015	Newry City		
2015–2016	Shelbourne Ladies		
2023	Linfield		
- Bellurgan United

International career^{‡}
2008–	Republic of Ireland	9	(0)
- * Club domestic league appearances and goals as of 22:34, 25 January 2016 (UTC) ‡ National team caps and goals as of 22:34, 25 January 2016 (UTC)

Grace Murray (born 26 May 1989) is an Irish international footballer. She made her debut for the Republic of Ireland women's national football team in February 2008.

Murray was capped 68 times for Ireland from under-17 to Senior.

Murray studied Sports Leadership at the Dundalk Institute of Technology.

She joined the Gardai in 2020.

== Club career ==
After coming through the youth ranks at Dundalk City, Murray represented her hometown club in the 2004 and 2005 FAI Women's Cup finals at Lansdowne Road. In 2004 Dundalk lost 4–1 to UCD. A report in The Irish Times newspaper praised her "great assurance" in Dundalk's 1–0 win over Peamount United in 2005. Murray transferred to St Francis and in August 2010 scored the club's first ever goal in European competition, in a 4–1 win over Portuguese champions 1º Dezembro.

Murray joined Peamount United before the Women's National League (WNL) was formed in 2011 and represented the club in the competition's first season. She had already featured in The Peas' 2011–12 UEFA Women's Champions League campaign, which ended with a defeat by Paris Saint-Germain.

After dislocating her elbow three minutes into the 2012–13 UEFA Women's Champions League qualifying round in Bosnia, Murray was ruled out for six months. She spent time in Canada, then played in the summer season with Northern Irish club Newry City.

Murray helped Newry City reach the 2014 IFA Women's Challenge Cup final, at Clandeboye Park in Bangor, where they were beaten 10–9 on penalties by Linfield after a 2–2 draw. In 2015, she was part of the Newry City team which won the Women's Premier League, with a dramatic last-minute winner over Mid-Ulster Ladies.

For the 2015–16 season, Murray returned to the Women's National League with Dublin-based club Shelbourne Ladies.

== International career ==
Murray made her debut for the Republic of Ireland U-19 team in August 2005, in a 3–2 friendly win over Finland U-19s at Richmond Park, Inchicore. On her competitive debut in October 2005, she scored a "spectacular" free-kick in a 7–0 win over Estonia U-19s at the A. Le Coq Arena.

In March 2006, Murray was called up to the senior national team for the first time, for the 2006 Algarve Cup. Murray won a debut cap in February 2008, as a late substitute in Ireland's 4–1 friendly win over Poland at John Hyland Park, Baldonnel.

Murray was included in a scholarship programme for current or potential senior national team players in December 2011. While attending Dundalk Institute of Technology, Murray represented Irish Universities at the World University Games, playing in the 2009 tournament in Belgrade and the 2013 edition in Kazan.
