= Cherelle Khassal =

Irish footballer (born 1991)

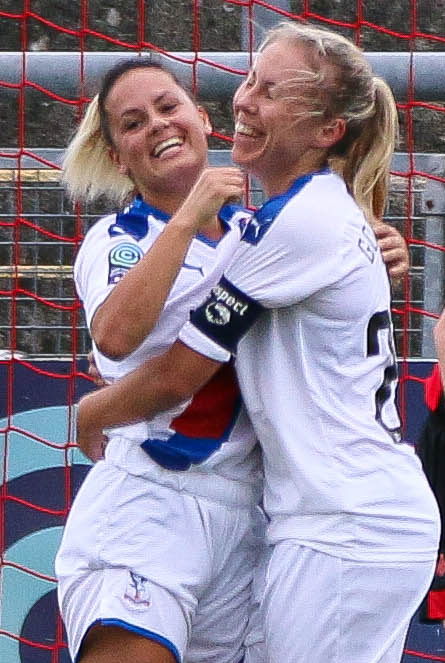
- Khassal (left) playing for Crystal Palace in 2019

Personal information
- Full name: Cherelle Merelle Nadia Khassal
- Date of birth: 9 January 1991 (age 35)
- Place of birth: England
- Positions: Winger; forward

Team information
- Current team: Farnham Town
- Number: 31

Youth career
- Portsmouth
- 2006–2010: Arsenal

Senior career*
Years	Team	Apps	(Gls)
2010	Benfica		
2010	Santa Clarita Blue Heat		
2011 and 2012	Los Angeles Strikers		
2012–2014	Wexford Youths	51	(27)
2012–2014	Brighton & Hove Albion Women	10	(5)
2014	Portsmouth	2	(0)
2014–2016	Lewes	18	(4)
2016–2019	Chichester City	45	(29)
2019–2021	Crystal Palace	29	(6)
2021–2022	Portsmouth	31	(27)
2022–2023	Dorking Wanderers	19	(27)
2024–2025	AFC Wimbledon	13	(3)
2026–	Farnham Town	3	(2)

International career^{‡}
2012–2016	Republic of Ireland	1	(0)
- * Club domestic league appearances and goals as of 11 October 2026 ‡ National team caps and goals as of 20 March 2024

Cherelle Khassal (born 9 January 1991) is an Irish international footballer who plays for English club Farnham Town. She made her debut for the Republic of Ireland women's national football team in May 2012.

== Club career ==
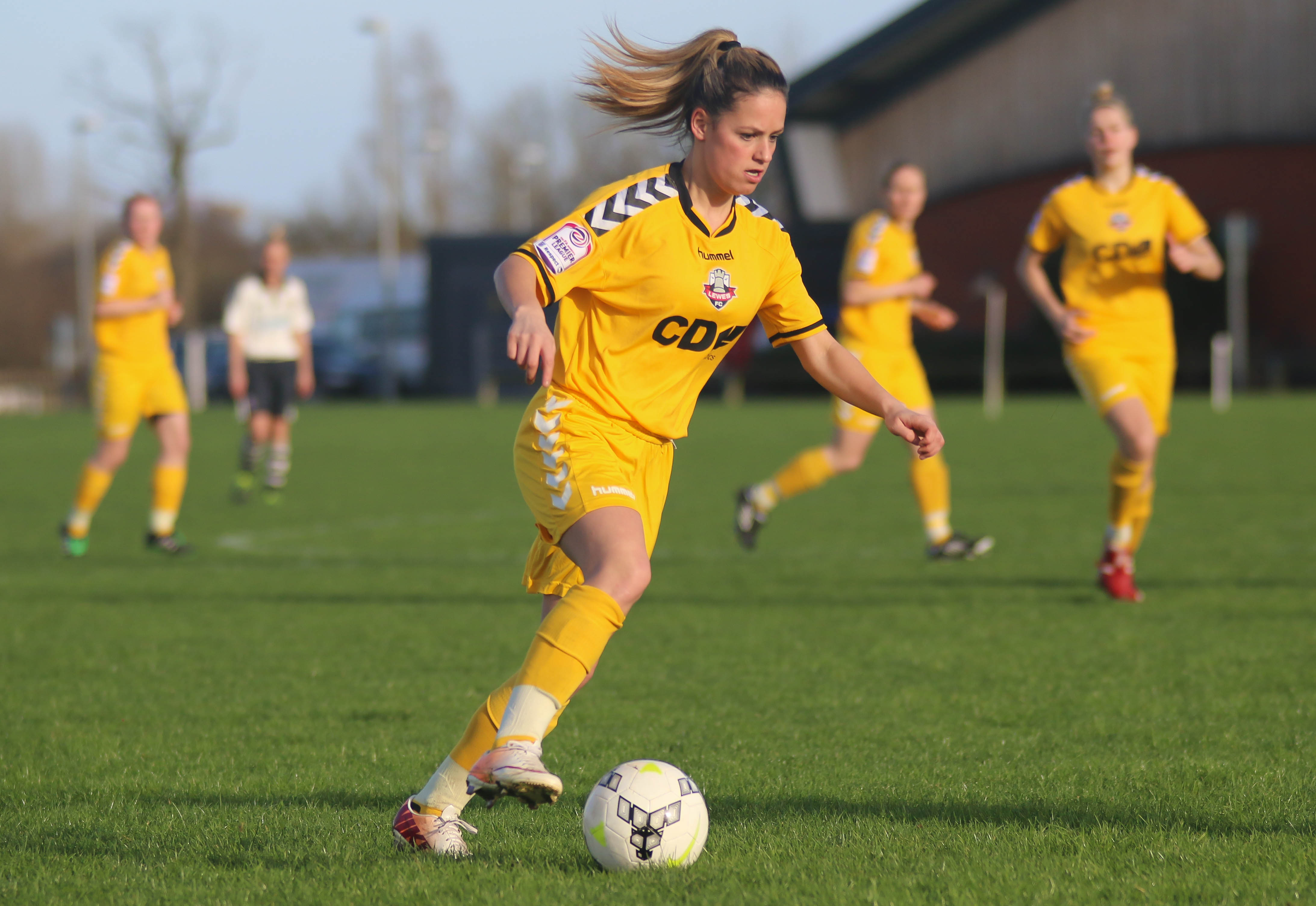
Khassal playing against Fulham Foundation Ladies

As a youngster Khassal travelled from Cowes on the Isle of Wight to train with Portsmouth when she was attending Cowes High School. She was scouted by Arsenal and joined The Gunners on a four-year academy contract in 2006. During the spring of 2010 Khassal was attached to Irish club Benfica. After moving to attend Capilano University, she played in the North American USL W-League with Santa Clarita Blue Heat and Los Angeles Strikers. She was nominated for W-League Rookie of the Season in 2010.

She then moved back to Ireland and made a favorable impact at Wexford Youths during the 2011–12 Women's National League season. She went on to clubs Brighton and Hove Albion, Portsmouth and Lewes. Khassal then joined up with Chichester Ladies in the summer of 2016.

After a successful first season with Chichester, they gained promotion for the first time in their history to the Women's Premier (South). Cherelle formed a deadly partnership with Charlie Wilson-Blakley and between them 30 goals were scored.

Her second season also saw a very good goals return of 18 in all competitions despite injury's plaguing her for most of the year. The team achieved a solid mid-table finish despite being tipped to go back down. A successful FA cup run saw 'Chi' reach the Quarter final stages against Liverpool. The game was played at Oakland's park (Chichester) and saw a record attendance of just over 600 people. The Reds ran out 3–0 winners on the day but Chichester showed a lot of courage and could have gone 1–0 within the first few minutes.

=== Return to Portsmouth ===
On 21 July 2021, Khassal signed for Portsmouth. Khassal finished the season with 27 goals in 31 appearances in all competitions, including 15 goals in 20 appearances in the league.

In June 2022 Khassal left Portsmouth and joined Dorking Wanderers. She won the London & South East Regional Division 1 North title with them in the 2022/23 season. Khassal was the 2nd highest goal scorer in the Division that season with 27 goals.

She joined AFC Wimbledon for the 2024–25 season, and notably scored the opening goal in the club's 5–0 defeat of Milton Keynes Dons.

Khassal joined Farnham Town for the 2026–27 season.

== International career ==
Khassal played for the Republic of Ireland Under-19 team in their 2010 UEFA Women's U-19 Championship Second qualifying round mini-tournament in Sweden.

In May 2012 national coach Susan Ronan gave Khassal a debut senior cap in a 1–0 friendly defeat by Switzerland at Stadion Niedermatten. She also appeared in Ireland's next match, a 1–0 UEFA Women's Euro 2013 qualifying defeat by Wales in Cork.
