= Deò-ghrèine =

Deò-ghrèine (Scottish Gaelic: [əɲ tʲɔˈɣɾʲeːnə]) or Deò-grèine means 'ray of sunshine'; or Dérgreine as 'tear of sunshine'. It occurs in the following:

- Fionn mac Cumhaill's famous banner, also known as Deò-ghrèine Mhic Cumhail after him.
- Perhaps inspired by MacCumhail's banner, An Deò-gréine was also used as the name of a Scottish Gaelic magazine, the organ of An Comunn Gàidhealach, first produced in 1905, later being retitled An Gàidheal. Its editors included Malcolm Macfarlane (1905–6) and Rev. Malcolm MacLennan (1906–8), best known for his dictionary.
- In James MacPherson’s Ossianic stories, based on Gaelic mythology, but with his own additions, it was also used for "the daughter of Cairbre, and wife of that Cruthgheal who was slain in battle by Swaran, king of Scandinavia, (Lochlann)". Some say that this character originally represented a daughter of the sun, something common in various mythologies. She was held captive in the Land of the Big Women, freed by Cailleach (disguised as a fox) and Brian. This version is possibly also spelled Der Greine or Dia Griene. The story of Dia Greine, the Caillaleach and Brian is also mentioned in The Encyclopedia of Celtic Mythology and Folklore By Patricia Monaghan.
- Another Dérgreine (in Irish Legend) sleeps with Laegaibe Mac Crimthann during his visit to Fairyland, story in The Book of Leinster. There is a variation of this legend where she was the daughter of a king, given to the hero Laoghaire Mac Crimthann as a reward for his service to her father in killing the fierce Fianna warrior Goll mac Morna mentioned in The Encyclopedia of Celtic Mythology and Folklore By Patricia Monaghan.

== See also ==
- Gráinne (given name)
- Grian (disambiguation)
