= Elaine O'Connor =

Irish footballer (born 1982)

Personal information
- Date of birth: 20 February 1982 (age 44)
- Place of birth: Dublin, Ireland
- Height: 5 ft 6 in (1.68 m)
- Position: Midfielder

Youth career
- Lourdes Celtic

College career
Years	Team	Apps	(Gls)
1999–2003	Hofstra Pride	64	(7)

Senior career*
Years	Team	Apps	(Gls)
- Shelbourne
- St Catherine's
2004–2005	Arsenal		
2005	Long Island Lady Riders		
2006–2008	Long Island Fury		

International career
	Republic of Ireland	54	
- * Club domestic league appearances and goals

Elaine O'Connor (born 20 February 1982) is an Irish former football midfielder. O'Connor played for clubs including Arsenal and Long Island Lady Riders, and represented the Republic of Ireland at senior international level.

== Club career ==
O'Connor took up football aged seven and played for five years at Killinarden Community School. She came to prominence at Dublin Women's Soccer League club Lourdes Celtic, winning the Dublin Cup at Under-14, 16 and 18 level. Spells at other Dublin clubs Shelbourne and St Catherine's followed for O'Connor.

In 1999 an American soccer coach named JoAnne Wagner spotted O'Connor and signed her to Hofstra University. O'Connor remained for five seasons, redshirting in 2002, and majoring in Physical Education. She also featured in the W-League for Long Island Lady Riders.

In 2004 O'Connor signed for Arsenal Ladies, making her debut in an FA Women's Community Shield defeat by Charlton Athletic. By 2005 O'Connor was back in America playing for Long Island Lady Riders. The following season she switched to Women's Premier Soccer League (WPSL) club Long Island Fury.

After her playing career, O'Connor remained in the United States and worked as a teacher.

== International career ==
O'Connor represented Republic of Ireland at youth level, then played for the senior team in the qualifying campaigns for the 2003 and 2007 FIFA Women's World Cups. She also played in the Euro 2009 qualifiers.

O'Connor was named Women's Senior International Player of the Year at the 2004 FAI International Football Awards. She won 54 caps for Ireland.
