= Dundalk City L.F.C. =

- Full name: Dundalk City Ladies Football Club
- Nickname: Lilywhites
- Founded: 1988
- Ground: Oriel Park; Eamonn Hiney Park; Bellurgan
- League: Dublin Women's Soccer League
Home colours

Dundalk City Ladies Football Club was an Irish association football club based in Dundalk, County Louth. During the early 2000s they were the "sister club" of Dundalk F.C. However, after winning the 2005 FAI Women's Cup and qualifying for the 2006–07 UEFA Women's Cup, the club split into two separate teams. Dundalk City was re-established as an independent club while Dundalk W.F.C. became affiliated to the League of Ireland club and went on to compete in the UEFA Women's Cup.

== History ==
=== Early years ===
The club was originally formed in 1988 as Castletown Celtic Girls F.C. and they were initially based in the Fatima district of Dundalk. They were named after Castletown River. Their first manager was Niall Gallagher who later served as club chairman. Between 1988 and 1994 they played in the Dundalk League and from 1996 they also began to enter teams in the North Eastern League. In 1999 the club was relaunched as Dundalk City, they joined the Dublin Women's Soccer League and they effectively became the "sister club" of Dundalk F.C. while still remaining a separate entity. The new name was partly chosen to reflect Dundalk's ambitions to gain city status but also to distinguish the ladies team from the men's team. Under this arrangement, Dundalk City adopted the same club colours and club crest as the men's team and also began to play home games at Oriel Park. In 2000 City won both a DWSL Intermediate League title and the DWSL Intermediate Cup. They also subsequently gained promotion to the DWSL Premier Division.

=== Cup success ===
In 2003 City appointed Tommy Tasker as the team coach. Tasker was a former goalkeeper with Shelbourne, St James's Gate, Glenavon and Monaghan United. Tasker would subsequently turn City into a successful cup team. In October 2003 with a squad that included Grace Murray, City won the DWSL Premier Cup, beating a St James's Gate team featuring Katie Taylor. City defeated Gate in the final 3–2 after extra time. The final was played at the home of Bluebell United and City were presented with the trophy by future Republic of Ireland women's national football team manager Susan Ronan. In 2004 City reached the final of the FAI Women's Cup, but lost 4–1 to UCD. In 2005 City played in both the DWSL Premier Cup and FAI Women's Cup finals. In the former they lost 2–0 to UCD, however in the latter they defeated Peamount United 1–0. The all-important goal was scored by Sonia Hoey in the 16th minute. In the FAI Women's Cup final Katie Taylor once again featured for City's opponents. Both the FAI Women's Cup finals that City played in were staged at Lansdowne Road as part of double headers with the men's FAI Cup finals.

=== Split ===
In 2006 a split developed within Dundalk City over a plan for the club to fully merge with Dundalk F.C. This effectively saw the emergence of two separate women's teams. Dundalk City, with Tommy Tasker as their coach, remained independent while Dundalk W.F.C. became affiliated with the League of Ireland club. After winning the 2005 FAI Women's Cup, Dundalk City had qualified for the 2006–07 UEFA Women's Cup. However following complications that resulted from the split, it was Dundalk W.F.C. that went on to represent the Republic of Ireland in this competition. In subsequent seasons the two rival clubs both entered teams in the FAI Women's Cup and the Dublin Women's Soccer League. In June 2007 Stephanie Roche joined Dundalk City after having struck up a friendship with Grace Murray. Roche scored twice on her debut for Dundalk City in a 5–2 win over Benfica.

== Notable former players ==
=== Republic of Ireland women's internationals ===
- (Republic of Ireland) Sonya Hughes
- (Republic of Ireland) Gillian McDonnell
- (Republic of Ireland) Grace Murray
- (Republic of Ireland) Stephanie Roche

=== Goalscorers ===
- (Republic of Ireland) Sonia Hoey – scored 10 goals in a 13–0 win against Dublin City University in a 2005 Dublin Women's Soccer League game.

== Honours ==
- FAI Women's Cup
  - Winners: 2005: 1
  - Runners-up: 2004: 1
- DWSL Premier Cup
  - Winners: 2003: 1
  - Runners-up: 2005: 1
- DWSL Intermediate Cup
  - Winners: 2000: 1
- DWSL Intermediate League
  - Winners: 2000: 1
