= 2007 FAI Women's Cup final =

- Event: 2007 FAI Women's Cup
Galway Ladies League	Raheny United
1	0
- Date: 14 October 2007
- Venue: Dalymount Park, Dublin
- Referee: Hilda McDermott

The 2007 FAI Women's Cup final, known as the 2007 FAI Umbro Women's Senior Cup final for sponsorship reasons, was the final match of the 2007 FAI Women's Cup, the national association women's football cup of the Republic of Ireland. The match took place on Sunday 14 October 2007 at Dalymount Park in Dublin, between a Galway Ladies League representative team and Raheny United.

The Galway side won the game 1–0 thanks to a Niamh Fahey penalty. Galway won the cup first time in their history, with the success in this competition helping lead to the later formation of Galway WFC in 2013.

== Background ==
Both sides came in to the match with it being their first ever final. The year before in 2006, the final was another case of a league representative side defeating a Dublin team 1–0, with Mayo Ladies League defeating UCD in Richmond Park.

== Match ==
=== Details ===
14 October 2007

Galway Ladies League	1–0	Raheny United
Fahey 75' (pen.)	Report

Dalymount Park, Dublin
Referee: Hilda McDermott

GK	(Republic of Ireland) Melissa Casserly
DF	(Republic of Ireland) Theresa Fahy
DF	(Republic of Ireland) Emer Flatley
DF	(Republic of Ireland) Annette Clarke
DF	(Republic of Ireland) Niamh Fahey
MF	(Republic of Ireland) Grainne Barrett	(substituted off) 84'
MF	(Republic of Ireland) Michelle Glynn
MF	(Republic of Ireland) Méabh De Búrca
MF	(Republic of Ireland) Susie Cunningham (c)	(substituted off) 68'
FW	(Republic of Ireland) Kara Mullins
FW	(Republic of Ireland) Julie-Ann Russell
Substitutes:
MF	(Republic of Ireland) Aoife Burke	(substituted on) 84'
MF	(Republic of Ireland) Heather Duffy	(substituted on) 68'
Manager:
(Republic of Ireland) Stephen Lally

GK	(Republic of Ireland) Niamh Reid Burke
DF	(Republic of Ireland) Wendy Stienen
DF	(Republic of Ireland) Christina Byrne
DF	(Republic of Ireland) Megan Nugent
DF	(Republic of Ireland) Sharon Boyle
MF	(Republic of Ireland) Lyndsey Hennelly
MF	(Republic of Ireland) Rachel Graham
MF	(Republic of Ireland) Kerrie Ryan	(substituted off) 63'
FW	(Republic of Ireland) Olivia O'Toole
FW	(Republic of Ireland) Noelle Murray
FW	(Republic of Ireland) Rebecca Creagh
Substitutes:
MF	(Republic of Ireland) Amy Curley	(substituted on) 63'

== Aftermath ==
Many of the players featured in the Galway Ladies League team that won the cup in 2007, went on to feature for Salthill Devon in their longing effort in the 2010 FAI Women's Cup final.
