= Nicola Sinnott =

Irish footballer (born 1987)

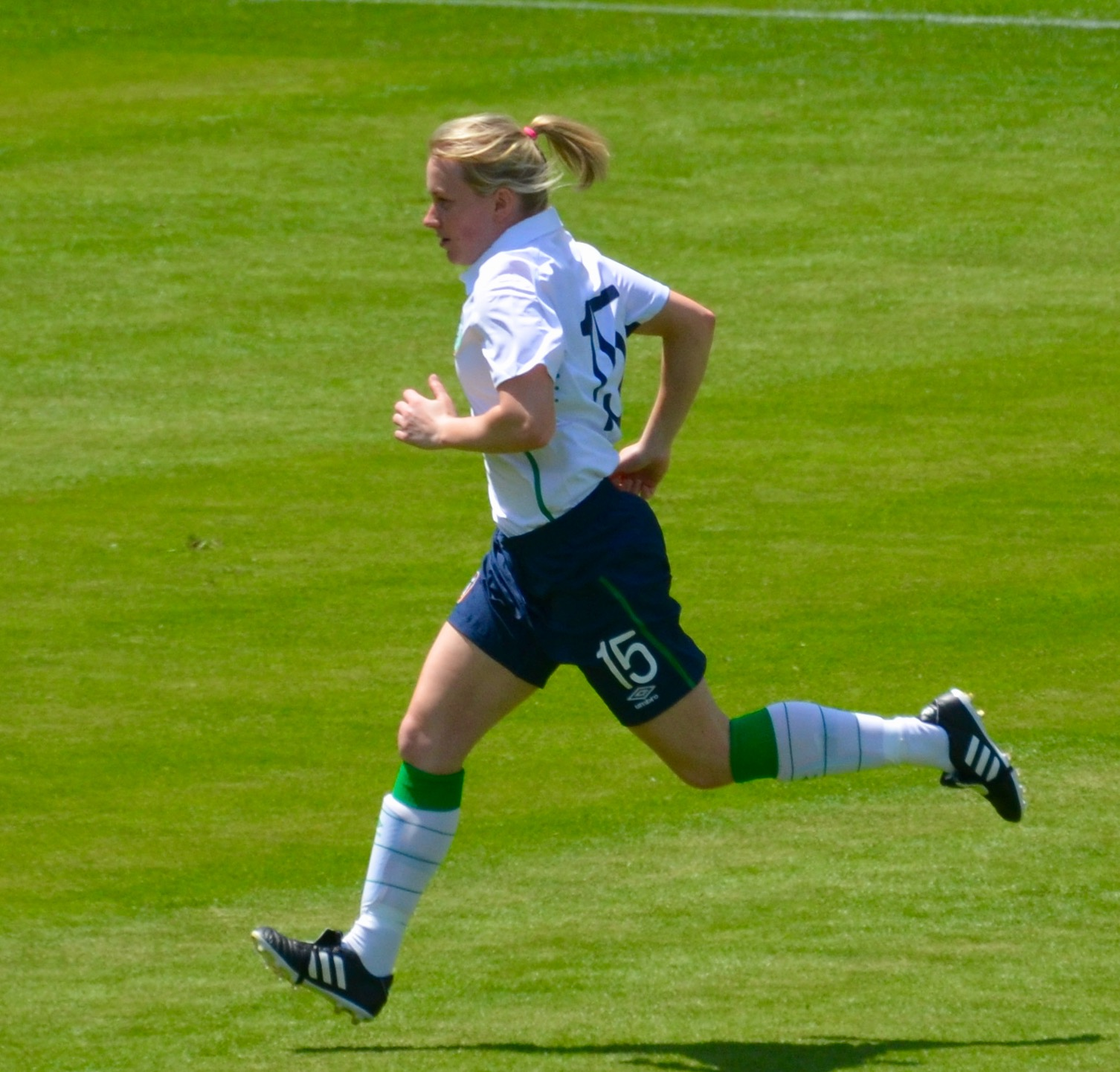
- Sinnott with Ireland in 2015

Personal information
- Date of birth: 8 August 1987 (age 39)
- Position: Right-back

Team information
- Current team: Wexford Youths
- Number: 16

Youth career
- Boca Juniors (Gorey)

College career
Years	Team	Apps	(Gls)
- UCD

Senior career*
Years	Team	Apps	(Gls)
- Peamount United
2011–2013	Shamrock Rovers		
2013–	Wexford Youths		

International career^{‡}
2015–	Republic of Ireland	1	(0)
- * Club domestic league appearances and goals as of 22:34, 14 January 2016 (UTC) ‡ National team caps and goals as of 22:34, 14 January 2016 (UTC)

Nicola Sinnott (born 8 August 1987) is an Irish footballer who plays as a right-back for Women's National League club Wexford Youths. She made one appearance for the Republic of Ireland national team.

== Club career ==
Sinnott played youth football for Boca Juniors of Gorey, then attended University College Dublin on a soccer scholarship. She transferred to Peamount United, where she was part of the 2010 FAI Women's Cup-winning team and the subsequent 2011–12 UEFA Women's Champions League campaign.

In November 2011, Sinnott signed for Shamrock Rovers ahead of the inaugural 2011–12 Women's National League season. After moving on to Wexford Youths, she found success in the 2014–15 season; being named in the league Team of the Season as the club won the championship.

== International career ==
Sinnott made her international debut at under-17 level for Ireland in April 2004. She was named player of the tournament in a four-team competition hosted in Castlebar. She later played at under-19 level and represented Irish Universities at the World University Games, playing in the 2009 tournament in Belgrade.

In May 2015, Sinnott was called up to the senior national team for the first time, for a friendly in the United States. After the match had been arranged, it was discovered to be outside FIFA's designated dates for international matches, so several of Ireland's first-choice players were not released by their clubs. Sinnott won a debut cap as a late substitute for Stephanie Roche in Ireland's 3–0 defeat.

== Personal life ==
Sinnott is employed as a secondary school teacher in Enniscorthy.
