= Dundalk W.F.C. =

- Full name: Dundalk Women's Football Club
- Nickname: Lilywhites
- Ground: Oriel Park
- League: Dublin Women's Soccer League; Ladies League of Ireland
Home colours

Dundalk Women's Football Club is an Irish association football club based in Dundalk, County Louth. They are the women's team of Dundalk F.C. They currently play in the Dublin Women's Soccer League. They represented the Republic of Ireland in the 2006–07 UEFA Women's Cup. An earlier Dundalk F.C. women's team also competed in the Ladies League of Ireland during the 1970s.

== History ==
=== Club history ===
The first Dundalk ladies team were the only team outside of England to be involved with the establishment of the Women's Football Association (WFA) as a founding member. It is unclear exactly how the Dundalk ladies team came to be involved with the WFA; Patricia Gregory, a WFA founder member, surmised they may have become involved through an advertisement in the paper for a challenge match.

=== Ladies League of Ireland ===
The first Dundalk ladies team represented Ireland against England (Corinthian Nomads) in an international on 10 May 1970, which took place at the Prestatyn Raceway, in North Wales. The game was won by the Corinthians 7–1, they played on the Raceway as women's football was still banned from association-affiliated grounds in Wales. 4,000 people attended the game, the Welsh officials were so impressed by the Dundalk side they were invited back to play Wales at Prestatyn in June the same year. In 1973 when the FAI/WFAI first organised a women's national league known as the Ladies League of Ireland, Dundalk were among its twelve founder members. Like Dundalk, other founder members included several teams associated with clubs in the men's League of Ireland. These included Finn Harps, Cork Celtic, Limerick and Sligo Rovers.

=== Split ===
In December 2005 Dundalk City L.F.C. won the FAI Women's Cup and as a result qualified for the 2006–07 UEFA Women's Cup. However, in 2006 a split developed within Dundalk City over a plan for the club to fully merge with Dundalk F.C. This effectively saw the emergence of two separate women's teams. Dundalk City L.F.C. was re-established as an independent club while Dundalk W.F.C. became affiliated with the League of Ireland club. Following complications that resulted from the split, it was Dundalk W.F.C. that went on to represent the Republic of Ireland in the UEFA Women's Cup. The two rival clubs both subsequently entered teams in the FAI Women's Cup and the Dublin Women's Soccer League.

== Dundalk in Europe ==
Dundalk W.F.C. competed in Group 1 of the 2006–07 UEFA Women's Cup.

=== Squad ===
Note: Flags indicate national team as defined under FIFA eligibility rules; some limited exceptions apply. Players may hold more than one non-FIFA nationality.

No.	Pos.	Nation	Player
1	GK	IRL	Janine Pepper
—		IRL	Aoife Kelly
—		IRL	Sharon Drumcoole
—		IRL	Mairead Nixon
—		IRL	Claire Mulholland
—		IRL	Laura English

No.	Pos.	Nation	Player
—		IRL	Sonia Hoey
—		IRL	Claire Brennan
—		IRL	Cadimhe Hearty
—		IRL	Celine Slyie
—		IRL	Keely Clayden

=== Final table ===
Pos	Team	Pld	W	D	L	GF	GA	GD	Pts	Qualification	SAE	CAR	MAK	DUN
1	(Netherlands) Saestum	3	3	0	0	15	1	+14	9	Advance to second qualifying round	—	–	7–0	6–1
2	(Wales) Cardiff City	3	2	0	1	5	4	+1	6		0–2	—	–	2–0
3	(Croatia) Maksimir (H)	3	1	0	2	10	10	0	3		–	2–3	—	–
4	(Republic of Ireland) Dundalk	3	0	0	3	1	16	−15	0		–	–	0–8	—

Source: RSSSF
(H) Hosts

Matchday One
Cardiff City LFC	2–0	Dundalk WFC
SV Saestum	7–0	ŽNK Maksimir
Matchday Two
SV Saestum	6–1	Dundalk WFC
ŽNK Maksimir	2–3	Cardiff City LFC
Matchday Three
Cardiff City LFC	0–2	SV Saestum
Dundalk WFC	0–8	ŽNK Maksimir

== Notable former players ==
=== Republic of Ireland women's internationals ===
- (Republic of Ireland) Gillian McDonnell
- (Republic of Ireland) Paula Brennan (née Gorham) played eleven times for Ireland.
