= St Patrick's Athletic L.F.C. =

- Full name: St Patrick's Athletic Ladies Football Club
- Founded: 1996
- League: Dublin Women's Soccer League
Home colours	Away colours

St Patrick's Athletic Ladies Football Club is an Irish association football club based in Inchicore, Dublin. It is the women's section of St Patrick's Athletic F.C.

== History ==
In 1996 St Patrick's Athletic F.C. took over the women's football team O'Connell Chics. In 1996 O'Connell Chics were runners up in both the Dublin Women's Soccer League and the FAI Women's Cup. In 1997 as St Patrick's Athletic L.F.C. and with a team that included Emma Byrne and Ciara Grant they were the DWSL champions. At least four St. Pat's players, Byrne, Grant, Grainne Kierans and Yvonne Tracy, went on to play for Arsenal.

== Notable players ==
=== Republic of Ireland women's internationals ===
- (Republic of Ireland) Emma Byrne
- (Republic of Ireland) Ciara Grant
- (Republic of Ireland) Grainne Kierans
- (Republic of Ireland) Yvonne Tracy

== Honours ==
=== O'Connell Chics ===
- Dublin Women's Soccer League
  - Runners-up: 1996: 1
- FAI Women's Cup
  - Runners-up: 1996: 1

=== St Patrick's Athletic ===
- Dublin Women's Soccer League
  - Winners: 1997: 1
