= Grian =

Grian may refer to the following:

== Geography ==
- Lough Graney, a lake in County Clare, Ireland
- River Graney, a river in County Clare, Ireland

== People ==
- Grian Chatten (born 19 July 1995), an Irish musician
- Grian (YouTuber), a British Minecraft YouTuber

== Mythology ==
- Grian (literally meaning "Sun"), a pre-Christian Irish goddess

== Structures and settlements ==
- An Grianán Theatre, the largest theatre in County Donegal, Ireland
- Grianan of Aileach, a hillfort in County Donegal, Ireland
- Griante, a comune in Lombardy, Italy
- Tuamgraney (literally meaning "Tomb of Grian"), a village in County Clare, Ireland
- Pallasgreen (literally meaning "Stockade of Grian"), a village in County Limerick, Ireland.

== Other uses ==
- Gráinne (given name)
- Deò-ghrèine (disambiguation)
