= Grainne Kierans =

Irish footballer and coach

Personal information
- Full name: Grainne Kierans
- Date of birth: 20 September 1978 (age 48)
- Place of birth: Drogheda, Ireland
- Position: Striker

Senior career*
Years	Team	Apps	(Gls)
–1999	St Patrick's Athletic		
1999–2001	Arsenal		
2001–2003	Charlton Athletic		
2003–2004	Leeds United		
2004–2005	Doncaster Rovers Belles		
2005–2006	Bristol Academy		
2007	Drogheda United Ladies		
2008–2009	St. Francis		

International career
- Republic of Ireland
- * Club domestic league appearances and goals

Gráinne Kierans (born 20 September 1978) is an Irish football coach and former player who was the head coach of Shamrock Rovers team who play in the Women's National League (Ireland). Kierans, the holder of a UEFA A licence, played as a midfielder or striker for several English clubs and represented the Republic of Ireland national team.

== Club career ==
As a 20-year-old, Kierans spent a summer playing semi-professionally in Denmark. From here she was signed by Arsenal, before moving on to Charlton Athletic two years later. At Arsenal she had been one of seven Irish players then at the club, including her former St Patrick's Athletic L.F.C. teammates Emma Byrne and Ciara Grant. Kierans quit Charlton in 2003 then had single season spells with Leeds United, Doncaster Rovers Belles and Bristol Academy.

Kierans returned to Ireland in 2006 through work, then played for Drogheda United and St. Francis. She won the FAI Women's Cup with St. Francis in 2008 then retired in 2009 after playing in the 2009–10 UEFA Women's Champions League qualifying round.

== International career ==
Kierans represented the Republic of Ireland in the 1999 FIFA Women's World Cup qualification (UEFA) tournament while attached to St. Patrick's Athletic. She went on to captain the side and was still a member of the squad after returning from her club career in England.

== Personal life ==
After returning to Ireland Kierans ran a gym in Ballyjamesduff.

== See also ==
- Gráinne (given name)
