= Emma Byrne =

Irish footballer (born 1979)

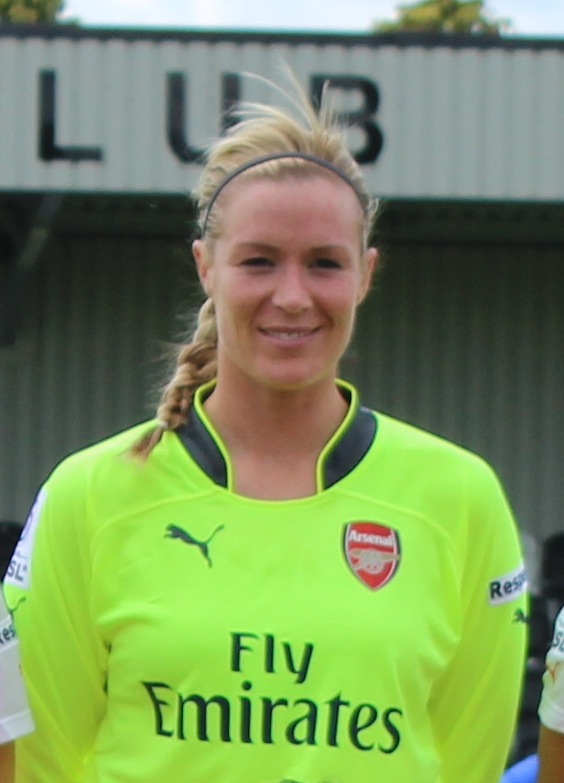
- Byrne in 2014

Personal information
- Full name: Emma Anne Byrne
- Date of birth: 14 June 1979 (age 47)
- Place of birth: Leixlip, Ireland
- Height: 1.83 m (6 ft 0 in)
- Position: Goalkeeper

Youth career
- Leixlip United

Senior career*
Years	Team	Apps	(Gls)
- St Patrick's Athletic Ladies
1999	Fortuna Hjørring	8	
2000–2016	Arsenal Ladies	459	(0)
2017	Brighton & Hove Albion Women	9	(0)

International career
1996–2017	Republic of Ireland	134	(0)

Managerial career
- 2025–: Lewes
- * Club domestic league appearances and goals

Emma Anne Byrne (born 14 June 1979) is an Irish former footballer who played as a goalkeeper. She played for the Republic of Ireland on a record 134 occasions and served as captain of the team. She spent almost 17 years with Arsenal before joining Brighton & Hove Albion in January 2017. Byrne currently serves as manager for Lewes F.C. and head of goalkeeping.

== Club career ==
Byrne started playing as a schoolgirl for Leixlip United before moving to as a goalkeeper to St Patrick's Athletic in the Dublin Women's Soccer League and then agreed to join professional Danish Elitedivisionen club Fortuna Hjørring after completing her schooling. After spending one year in Denmark, Byrne returned to Ireland because she was homesick and took a job as a secretary with the Health Board.

When Arsenal Ladies' goalkeeper Lesley Higgs was injured, the club's Irish midfielder Ciara Grant alerted Arsenal manager Vic Akers to her friend Byrne's availability. Byrne joined Arsenal in January 2000 and quickly became their first choice goalkeeper. She won a domestic treble in her first full season with Arsenal, saving a penalty in the 2001 FA Women's Cup final win over Fulham, and was voted club Players' Player of the Year in 2003 and 2005.

In 2006-07, Byrne was part of the Arsenal squad which won every single League game as well as the quadruple. She also became a European champion with Arsenal in April 2007, when they beat Umeå IK in the 2007 UEFA Women's Cup Final 1–0 on aggregate, a tie in which she made numerous vital saves in the home and away games. In 2008 she rejected an offer to join American Women's Professional Soccer franchise Boston Breakers, who failed to match her salary expectations.

Byrne was given a free transfer by Arsenal in December 2016 on the expiry of her contract, after being supplanted in the team by Sari van Veenendaal. With Arsenal, Byrne won eleven league titles, ten FA Women's Cups, five FA Women's Premier League Cups, two FA Women's League Cups and the UEFA Women's Champions League once. She holds the record number of appearances for Arsenal with 459.

She agreed to join FA WSL 2 club Brighton & Hove Albion Women for the FA WSL Spring Series. On 4 August 2017, 38-year-old Byrne announced her retirement from football on Twitter.

In August 2019 it was announced that Byrne had come out of retirement to join Spanish club Terrassa FC.

== International career ==
Byrne began her international career with Ireland's youth teams at the age of 14. Byrne was called up for the first time by the Republic of Ireland national team in March 1996 against Belgium but did not play. She made her first appearance on 6 September 1997 against Northern Ireland.

Byrne played in multiple World Cup and Euro qualifying campaigns, but Ireland did not qualify for any tournaments during her tenure. She won her 100th cap against Croatia on 26 September 2013.

Following the retirement of Ciara Grant, coach Sue Ronan named Byrne the team captain in March 2013.

In April 2017 a player revolt led by Byrne secured substantially improved working conditions for Ireland's female national team players. With eleven other players, Byrne aired grievances about the team's treatment and threatened to go on strike. She played her final game for Ireland against Wales in June 2017 and retired in August of that year.

Byrne is the most capped player for Ireland with 134 senior caps over 21 years.

== Coaching career ==
=== Arsenal ===
At Arsenal, Byrne also worked for the club doing administrative work and coaching young goalkeepers while doing her coaching badges. She has also served as a coach-educator, helping to educate coaches for the FA around England.

=== Ireland ===
Byrne was named to Ireland interim manager Eileen Gleeson's coaching team in September 2023.

=== Southampton ===
On 14 February 2025 Byrne was announced as Women's Assistant Coach at Southampton.

=== Lewes ===
On 31 July 2025, Byrne was named manager and head of goalkeeping at third tier FA Women's National League South club Lewes F.C. Women, with the club confirming she would retain her role with the Irish Women's national team.

== Personal life ==
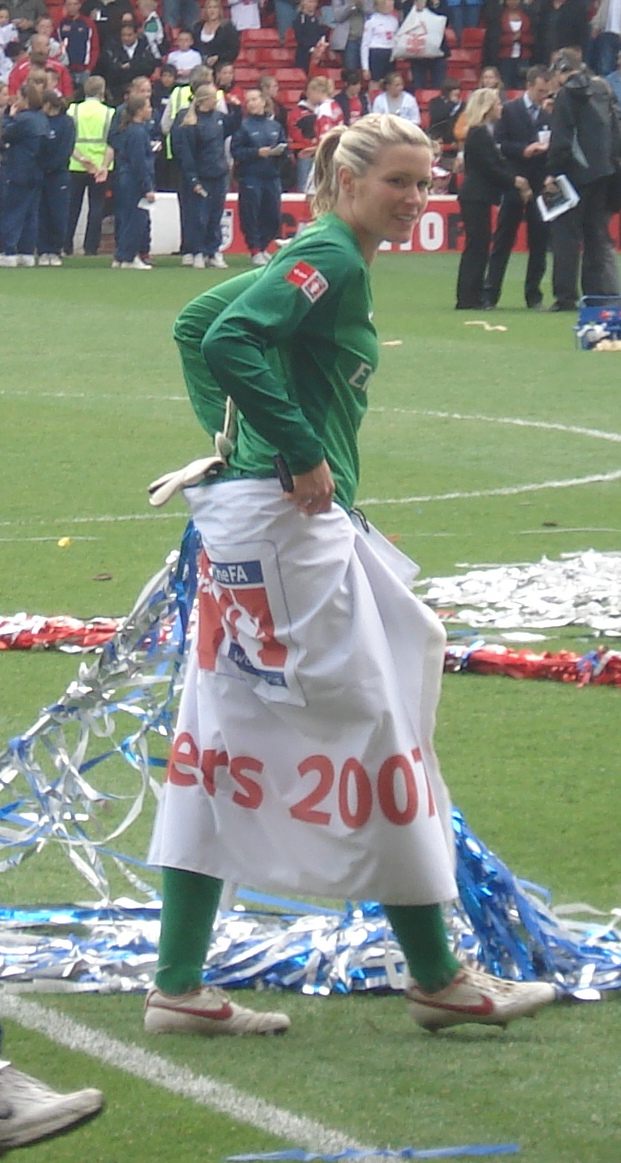
Byrne after the 2007 FA Women's Cup final

Byrne grew up in Leixlip, County Kildare, and attended secondary school at Coláiste Chiaráin.

She previously worked in the Football Association of Ireland (FAI) ticket office and was later employed as a coach in Arsenal's academy. She married former professional footballer Marcus Bignot in June 2013. In June 2023, she married her old Arsenal teammate Vicky Losada of Spain.

Byrne has served as an ambassador for Nike's Here I Am campaign. She also did a three-year degree in sports journalism and broadcasting at Staffordshire University.

Byrne became the first women's player inducted into the FAI Hall of Fame in 2018. She was awarded for her service to the women's game and for her playing career for Arsenal and Ireland.

== Honours ==
Arsenal

- UEFA Women's Champions League: 2007
- FA WSL: 2011, 2012
- FA Women's Premier League National Division (9): 2000–01, 2001–02, 2003–04, 2004–05, 2005–06, 2006–07, 2007–08, 2008–09, 2009–10
- FA Women's Cup (9): 2000–01, 2003–04, 2005–06, 2006–07, 2007–08, 2008–09, 2010–11, 2012–13, 2013–14, 2015–16
- FA WSL Cup: 2011, 2012, 2013
- FA Women's Premier League Cup: 1999–2000, 2000–01, 2004–05, 2006–07, 2007–08

Individual

- Arsenal Ladies Player of the Year: 2003 & 2005
- Eircom International Player of the Year: 2008
- FAI Senior Women's International Player of the Year: 2007, 2012
- PFA Ireland Merit Award: 2017
- FAI Hall of Fame: 2018

Records

- Record appearances holder for Ireland.
- Record appearances holder for Arsenal.
