= Gráinne (given name) =

- Gráinne in a Gaelic type.
- Gender: Feminine
- Language: Irish

Other names
- Anglicisations: Grace, Gertrude, Gertie

Gráinne (Irish pronunciation: [ˈɡɾˠaːn̠ʲə]) is a feminine given name in the Irish language. The name is of an uncertain origin, although it is likely to be related to the word 'grá', which means 'love' in the Irish language. The name is also borne by a famed character in Irish mythology—Gráinne, who was the daughter of Cormac mac Airt, a legendary High King of Ireland.

The name can be Latinised as Grania; and can be Anglicised as Granya. The name Gráinne is also sometimes represented in English as Grace, Gertrude, and Gertie, though these English names are etymologically unrelated.

== Notable people ==
- Gráinne, daughter of Cormac mac Airt
- Gráinne Ní Mháille (c.1530–c.1603), Chieftain of the Clan Ó Máille, and pirate. Also known as 'The Pirate Queen'
- Grainne Clancy (born 1961), Irish cricketer
- Gráinne Conole (born 1964), Irish academic
- Grainne Gallanagh (born 1994), Irish model
- Grainne Godfree, American television writer
- Grainne Kierans, (born 1978), Irish international footballer
- Grainne Leahy (born 1966), Irish cricketer
- Gráinne Mulvey (born 1966), Irish composer
- Gráinne Murphy (born 1993), Irish swimmer
- Gráinne Seoige (born 1973), television presenter

== See also ==
- List of Irish-language given names
- Grian (disambiguation)
