= Mary Waldron =

Irish cricketer & footballer (born 1984)

Personal information
- Full name: Mary Veronica Waldron
- Date of birth: 5 May 1984 (age 42)
- Place of birth: Dublin, Ireland
- Position: Striker

Senior career*
Years	Team	Apps	(Gls)
- St James's Gate
- UCD
- St Francis
- St Catherine's
2011–	Raheny United		

International career^{‡}
- Republic of Ireland
- * Club domestic league appearances and goals ‡ National team caps and goals as of 25 August 2011

Mary Veronica Waldron (born 5 May 1984) is an Irish association football player and cricketer who has represented both the Republic of Ireland women's national football team and the Ireland women's cricket team. She has also stood as an umpire in cricket matches.

== Football ==
=== Club career ===
Waldron was nominated for the FAI Under-18 Women Player of the Year in 2001 and 2002, while playing for St James's Gate. She was awarded a sport scholarship to University College Dublin in 2003. In the 2004 FAI Women's Cup final at Lansdowne Road, Waldron played in UCD's 4–1 win over Dundalk City.

In July 2004 Waldron made her UEFA Women's Cup debut for UCD; in a 5–0 defeat to Montpellier HSC.

Waldron hit an injury–time winner from the penalty spot, as St Francis beat Peamount United 2–1 in the final of the 2008 FAI Women's Cup at Richmond Park. She also played in 2009 as St Francis beat St Catherine's 1–0 to retain the Cup. In the 2011 final Waldron headed the opening goal in St Catherine's 3–1 win over Wilton United at Turners Cross.

=== International career ===
Waldron captained Ireland at Under-19 level. Coach Noel King gave her an appearance in Ireland's senior team in a 2–1 friendly win over Faroe Islands in Klaksvík on 12 October 2004. In August 2011 she reappeared for the senior team, as an 86th-minute substitute for Shannon Smyth in a 1–0 home friendly defeat to Switzerland.

Waldron also represented Irish Universities at the World University Games, playing in the 2009 tournament in Belgrade.

== Cricket ==
Mary Waldron
Cricket information
- Batting: Right-handed
- Role: Wicket-keeper; umpire

International information
- National side: Ireland (2010–2023)
- ODI debut (cap 63): 4 July 2010 v New Zealand
- Last ODI: 25 July 2023 v Australia
- T20I debut (cap 20): 14 October 2010 v Sri Lanka
- Last T20I: 20 February 2023 v India

Domestic team information
- Years: Team
- 2015–2019: Dragons
- 2021–present: Typhoons

Umpiring information
- T20Is umpired: 6 (2019)
- FC umpired: 1 (2019)
- LA umpired: 1 (2019)
- T20 umpired: 2 (2018)

Career statistics
Competition	WODI	WT20I
Matches	56	88
Runs scored	481	531
Batting average	13.00	11.54
100s/50s	0/0	0/1
Top score	42	55*
Catches/stumpings	33/16	34/28
- Source: Cricinfo, 28 July 2023

In July 2010 Waldron made her One Day International debut for Ireland women's cricket team, against New Zealand at Kibworth Cricket Club New Ground. She is a wicket-keeper. She was a member of Ireland's squad for the 2018 ICC Women's World Twenty20 Qualifier tournament. In October 2018, she was named in Ireland's squad for the 2018 ICC Women's World Twenty20 tournament in the West Indies.

In August 2019, she was named in Ireland's squad for the 2019 ICC Women's World Twenty20 Qualifier tournament in Scotland. In July 2020, she was awarded a part-time professional contract by Cricket Ireland for the following year. In November 2021, she was named in Ireland's team for the 2021 Women's Cricket World Cup Qualifier tournament in Zimbabwe.

On 27 July 2023, Waldron announced her retirement from international cricket.

=== Umpiring ===
Waldron is also pursuing a career as a cricket umpire. In October 2016, she became the first woman for 38 years to stand as an umpire in a men's Grade cricket match in South Australia. In August 2018, she became the first Irish woman to umpire in a men's List A fixture. In May 2019, the International Cricket Council named her as one of the eight women on the ICC Development Panel of Umpires. On 15 June 2019, she stood in her first Twenty20 International (T20I) match, between Italy and Norway, in the Regional Finals of the 2018–19 ICC T20 World Cup Europe Qualifier tournament. In September–October 2019, she stood in Australian women's domestic league, the Women's Big Bash League.

== Hockey ==
Waldron has also played Hockey for Glenanne where her teammates included Nicola Daly and she was coached by Nikki Symmons.

== See also ==
- List of Twenty20 International cricket umpires
