= St Francis L.F.C. =

- Full name: St Francis Football Club
- Nickname: The Hoops
- Founded: 2006
- Ground: John Hyland Park; Baldonnel
- League: Dublin Women's Soccer League
Home colours

St Francis Ladies Football Club is an Irish association football club based in Baldonnel, County Dublin. It is the women's section of St Francis F.C. They have entered teams in both the FAI Women's Cup and the Dublin Women's Soccer League. They also represented the Republic of Ireland in the 2009–10 and 2010–11 UEFA Women's Champions Leagues.

== History ==
In 2008 and 2009 with a squad that included Mary Waldron, Grainne Kierans and Megan Campbell, St Francis won two successive FAI Women's Cup/Dublin Women's Soccer League doubles. In the 2008 FAI Women's Cup final, Waldron hit an injury–time winner from the penalty spot as St Francis beat Peamount United 2–1 at Richmond Park. In the 2009 FAI Women's Cup final St Francis defeated St Catherine's 1–0. They also retained the Dublin Women's Soccer League title and won the 2009 DWSL Premier Cup.

== St Francis in Europe ==
=== 2009–10 UEFA Women's Champions League ===
After winning the 2008 FAI Women's Cup, St Francis qualified for the 2009–10 UEFA Women's Champions League. All of the group matches were played in Cyprus at the Tsirion Stadium and the Pafiako Stadium. St Francis lost all three matches in the tournament. Veteran Republic of Ireland, international Grainne Kierans highlighted the gap in funding with their opponents. Kierans observed that "one of the teams had a budget of €700,000 to €1 million, whereas we had to raise the money ourselves to go there".

==== Group F ====
Team	Pld	W	D	L	GF	GA	GD	Pts
(Russia) Rossiyanka	3	3	0	0	19	0	+19	9
(Cyprus) Apollon Limassol	3	2	0	1	6	1	+5	6
(Israel) Maccabi Holon	3	1	0	2	2	11	−9	3
(Republic of Ireland) St Francis	3	0	0	3	0	15	−15	0

30 July 2009
Rossiyanka	11–0	St Francis
1 August 2009
St Francis	0–2	Maccabi Holon
4 August 2009
St Francis	0–2	Apollon

=== 2010–11 UEFA Women's Champions League ===
After winning the 2009 FAI Women's Cup, St Francis qualified for the 2010–11 UEFA Women's Champions League. Their group matches were played in Croatia at the Stadion Gradski vrt and at the Stadion HNK Cibalia. St Francis' squad included among others, Megan Campbell, Kelly Jones and Cheryl Foster. The latter two were both on loan from Liverpool L.F.C. After winning their opening game 4–1 against 1º Dezembro, St Francis lost their second game 9–0 to Rossiyanka. However St Francis secured second place in the tournament with a 5–3 win against the hosts, Osijek, despite being 3–0 down at half-time.

==== Group 6 ====
Team	Pld	W	D	L	GF	GA	GD	Pts
(Russia) Rossiyanka	3	3	0	0	18	1	+17	9
(Republic of Ireland) St Francis	3	2	0	1	9	13	−4	6
(Portugal) 1º Dezembro	3	1	0	2	6	9	−3	3
(Croatia) Osijek	3	0	0	3	4	14	−10	0

5 August 2010
1º Dezembro	1–4	St Francis
7 August 2010
Rossiyanka	9–0	St Francis
10 August 2010
St Francis	5–3	Osijek

== Notable former players ==
=== Republic of Ireland women's internationals ===
- (Republic of Ireland) Megan Campbell
- (Republic of Ireland) Sonya Hughes
- (Republic of Ireland) Grainne Kierans
- (Republic of Ireland) Katie McCabe
- (Republic of Ireland) Grace Murray
- (Republic of Ireland) Mary Waldron

=== Wales women's internationals ===
- (Wales) Cheryl Foster

== Honours ==
- FAI Women's Cup
  - Winners: 2008, 2009: 2
- Dublin Women's Soccer League
  - Winners: 2008, 2009: 2
- DWSL Premier Cup
  - Winners: 2009: 1
