= Dublin Women's Soccer League =

- Founded: 1994
- Country: Ireland
- Region: County Dublin
- Divisions: 5
- League cup(s): Premier Cup; Intermediate Cup; Intermediate Shield

The Dublin Women's Soccer League (DWSL) was a women's association football league featuring teams from the Republic of Ireland. While the majority of the participating clubs were based in the Greater Dublin Area, the DWSL had regularly included teams from outside this area. Whilst previously the DWSL was one of the largest women's leagues in Ireland it had been overtaken by the Wexford, MGL and Cork Leagues. In late 2019, the FAI following discussions revamped Women's Football in the Greater Dublin area and the Eastern Women's Football League (EWFL) chaired by the MGL's Tony Gains were granted the only license to run women's adult football in the Dublin area. The EWFL is run by committees of the MGL and the former DWSL.

In addition to the Premier Division, there was also a Major Division and seven intermediate divisions. The DWSL operates in summer, with games played from May until September.

== History ==
=== Early seasons ===
The Dublin Women's Soccer League was founded in 1994 following a merger of the Leinster Ladies' League and the Civil Service League. The inaugural champions were Elm Rovers. Its earliest members included several clubs which had been founded independently of men's clubs. These included Benfica, Rathfarnham United, Castle Rovers, O'Connell Chics and Welsox F.C. However the latter three subsequently became affiliated to Shamrock Rovers, St Patrick's Athletic and Shelbourne respectively. Castle Rovers were champions in 1995 and 1996 before a St Patrick's Athletic L.F.C. team that included Emma Byrne and Ciara Grant were champions in 1997.

=== Shamrock Rovers era ===
During the late 1990s and early 2000s Shamrock Rovers emerged as the DWSL's strongest team. Between 1998 and 2002 they were league champions five times in row. They also won the DWSL Premier Cup on six successive occasions between 1997 and 2002 and the FAI Women's Cup on five successive occasions between 1997 and 2001. This meant that Rovers also won four successive trebles between 1998 and 2001. Rovers' leading player during this era was Olivia O'Toole.

=== UCD era ===
During the mid-2000s UCD replaced Shamrock Rovers as the DWSL's strongest team. With a team that included Sylvia Gee and Mary Waldron, UCD were league champions four times in a row between 2003 and 2006. They also won the DWSL Premier Cup in 2004, 2005 and 2007, and the FAI Women's Cup three times in a row between 2002 and 2004 and achieved the treble in 2004.

=== DWSL teams in Europe ===
Between 2001 and 2010 several DWSL teams played in the UEFA Women's Cup after winning the FAI Women's Cup. In 2002–03, Shamrock Rovers became the first women's team to represent the Republic of Ireland in Europe. UCD became the second Republic of Ireland team to qualify for Europe after winning the cup. UCD played in the 2003–04, 2004–05 and 2005–06 UEFA Women's Cups. Other DWSL teams to play in Europe included St Francis, Peamount United and Dundalk W.F.C. The latter came about under bizarre circumstances. In 2005 Dundalk City won the FAI Women's Cup and as a result qualified for the 2006–07 UEFA Women's Cup. However, in 2006 a split developed within Dundalk City over a plan for the club to fully merge with Dundalk F.C. This effectively saw the emergence of two separate women's teams. Dundalk City was re-established as an independent club while Dundalk W.F.C. became affiliated with the League of Ireland club. Following complications that resulted from the split, it was Dundalk W.F.C. that went on to represent the Republic of Ireland in the UEFA Women's Cup.

=== WNL and DWSL ===
When the Women's National League was formed in 2011, three of the six founding members – Peamount United, Raheny United and Shamrock Rovers – were members of the DWSL. All three clubs continued to enter reserve teams in the DWSL once the WNL was established. As the WNL expanded two more teams, UCD and Shelbourne, also switched from the DWSL to the WNL.

=== Replacement ===
In December 2019, the Eastern Women's Football League (EWFL) was formed after discussions between the Football Association of Ireland (FAI), the DWSL and the Metropolitan Girls League (MGL), a subsidiary of the North Dublin Schoolboys/girls League (NDSL).

== 2016 teams ==
=== Premier Division ===
Team	Home town/suburb	Ground
Bray Wanderers	Bray	Carlisle Grounds
Dundalk	Dundalk	Oriel Park
Sporting Kilmore	Coolock	Oscar Traynor Road
Monaghan United	Monaghan	Gortakeegan
Peamount United B	Newcastle, County Dublin	Greenogue
Raheny United	Raheny	St Anne's Park
St Francis	Baldonnel, County Dublin	John Hyland Park
St Catherine's	Walkinstown/The Liberties, Dublin	Walkinstown Avenue

=== Major Division ===
Team	Home town/suburb	Ground
Albion Rovers	Monasterboice	Muireachs Park
Cabinteely	Cabinteely	Kilbogget Park
Drimnagh Celtic	Drimnagh	
Eureka Kells	Kells, County Meath	Dublin Road
Lakelands	Stillorgan	
Leixlip United	Leixlip	Leixlip Amenities Centre
Peamount United C	Newcastle, County Dublin	Greenogue
Templeogue	Templeogue	

== List of winners by season ==
Season	Winner	Runners-up	−15B.C
2015	Shelbourne		
2014			
2013			
2012			
2011			
2010	Peamount United		
2009	St Francis		
2008	St Francis	St Catherine's	
2007			
2006	UCD	Peamount United	
2005	UCD	Peamount United	
2004	UCD	Shamrock Rovers	
2003	UCD	Shamrock Rovers	
2002	Shamrock Rovers	UCD	
2001	Shamrock Rovers	Rathfarnham United	
2000	Shamrock Rovers	Shelbourne	
1999	Shamrock Rovers	Shelbourne	
1998	Shamrock Rovers	Shelbourne	
1997	St Patrick's Athletic	Shamrock Rovers	
1996	Castle Rovers	O'Connell Chics	
1995	Castle Rovers	Welsox F.C.	
1994	Elm Rovers	Verona F.C.	

== DWSL Premier Cup ==
The DWSL Premier Cup is the main league cup competition for DWSL clubs. The cup is also known as Pat Breheny Memorial Premier Cup. The cup was first played for in 1997 and Shamrock Rovers subsequently won the competition on six successive occasions. In 2003 Dundalk City became first team apart from Rovers to win the competition.

=== List of DWSL Premier Cup finals ===
Season	Winner	Score	Runners-up	Venue	−15B.C
2016	Boyne Rovers	1–2	T.E.K Utd		
2015	Peamount United	2–0	Shelbourne		
2014					
2013 (Note: The finalists were Peamount United and St Catherine's.)				Greenogue	
2012					
2011					
2010	Peamount United	5–1	St Francis		
2009	St Francis				
2008					
2007	UCD				
2006					
2005	UCD	2–0	Dundalk City	AUL Complex	
2004	UCD	6–1	St James's Gate		
2003	Dundalk City	3–2	St James's Gate	Bluebell United	
2002	Shamrock Rovers				
2001	Shamrock Rovers				
2000	Shamrock Rovers				
1999	Shamrock Rovers				
1998	Shamrock Rovers				
1997	Shamrock Rovers				
