= Sonia Hoey =

Irish association footballer and Gaelic footballer (died 2024)

Sonia Hoey (died 5 March 2024) was an Irish association footballer and Gaelic footballer.

== Career ==
Hoey, nicknamed Sonic, played football with a range of clubs including Castletown Celtic, Peamount Ladies, Rock Celtic and Castletown Belles. It was with Dundalk City that she had her biggest success. Hoey scored the only goal of the game in the 2005 Women’s FAI Cup final against Peamount United at Lansdowne Road to bring the trophy to Dundalk for the first and only time. In all, she scored 26 goals that season, 10 of which came in a single match against DCU.

Hoey also played Gaelic football with the Dowdallshill club and won a Louth JLFC title in 2012 and a Louth ILFC title in 2013. She also lined out with the Louth senior ladies' football team.

== Illness and death ==
Hoey was diagnosed with stage 3 cervical cancer in February 2019 and underwent an aggressive treatment of radiation and chemotherapy. She was almost a year in remission when, in July 2020, it was discovered that the incurable cervical cancer had returned and spread to her lungs.

Hoey died on 5 March 2024.

== Honours ==
Dundalk City

- FAI Women's Cup: 2005
