= UCD Women's Soccer Club =

- Full name: University College Dublin Women's Soccer Club
- Nickname: Belfield's Belles
- Founded: 1966
- Ground: Jackson Park; UCD Bowl; Belfield Park
- League: Women's National League; WSCAI Premier Division; Dublin Women's Soccer League
Home colours	Away colours

UCD Women's Soccer Club is an Irish association football club based in Dún Laoghaire–Rathdown. It is the women's association football team of University College Dublin. Founded in 1966, UCD are one of the oldest women's football clubs in the Republic of Ireland. Like the UCD men's team, the women's football team has competed in national competitions, such as the FAI Women's Cup and the Women's National League, as well as intervarsity competitions. UCD has also represented the Republic of Ireland in the UEFA Women's Cup. Between 2014 and 2018, following a merger, with DLR Waves, the club played in the Women's National League and FAI Women's Cup as UCD Waves. However, in 2018 UCD withdrew from the WNL. DLR Waves was subsequently revived as a separate club, taking UCD Waves' place in the WNL.

== History ==
=== Intervarsity level ===
According to Professor Meenan's History of UCD Sport, the UCD women's association football team was founded in 1966, playing their first games in 1967, including one against Dublin University. However it was not until the early 1980s that the club began to play regularly. In 1983 and 1984 they finished as runners-up in the LSCAI Intervarsity Cup. In 1991 UCD joined the national colleges league, which was organised by the Ladies Soccer Colleges Association of Ireland (LSCAI) and then by the Women's Soccer Colleges Association of Ireland (WSCAI). The club won its first Colleges Premier Division title in 1994–95 with a 100% record and without conceding a goal all season. The club completed an Intervarsity double after also winning the Intervarsity Cup for the first time. A second Intervarsity double was completed in 1996–97.

=== FAI Women's Cup ===
UCD entered the FAI Women's Cup for the first time in 2002 and won it on their first attempt after defeating Shamrock Rovers 2–1 in the final. Goals came from captain Linda Greene and Carmel Kissane. Greene was the leading goal scorer for UCD and the captain during her 2 years playing at the university before transferring back to captain her old club Shamrock Rovers in 2004. With a team that included Sylvia Gee, Mary Waldron, Valerie Redmond, Caroline Thorpe and Nora Stapleton, UCD retained the cup in 2003 after defeating Lifford Ladies in the final. Carmel Kissane scored both goals in a 2–0 win. Under coach Larry Mahony, UCD completed a three-in-a-row of FAI Women's Cup wins when they defeated Dundalk City 4–1 in the 2004 final. UCD were also finalists in 2006 but they lost 1–0 to the Mayo Ladies League. As UCD Waves, the club were also runners up in 2014 and 2017.

=== Dublin Women's Soccer League ===
In 2002 UCD also began entering a team in the Dublin Women's Soccer League. After finishing as runners up in their debut season, UCD completed a four-in-a-row of DWSL titles between 2003 and 2006. The also won the DWSL's main league cup competition, the DWSL Premier Cup in 2004, 2005 and 2007.

=== Women's National League era ===
==== Early seasons ====
The UCD women's team applied to join the Women's National League for the inaugural 2011–12 season. However their application fell through when the university couldn't guarantee them regular access to UCD Bowl. The men's football team and men's rugby union team were given priority access. During the 2011–12, 2012–13 and 2013–14 season the majority of UCD women's team and several alumni played in the WNL for other clubs. Louise Quinn, Dora Gorman, Julie-Ann Russell, Caroline Thorpe and Chloe Mustaki all played for Peamount United while Siobhán Killeen, Ciara Grant and Mary Waldron played for Raheny United. Nicola Sinnott also played for Shamrock Rovers before switching to Wexford Youths. Meanwhile, Dora Gorman, Julie-Ann Russell, Chloe Mustaki, Siobhán Killeen, Ciara Grant also played for UCD in intervarsity competitions and in 2013–14 they helped UCD win the WSCAI Premier Division and the WSCAI Futsal Cup.

==== UCD Waves ====
Before the start of the 2014–15 season it was announced that DLR Waves and UCD would merge. Eileen Gleeson, formerly of Peamount United, was appointed manager of the new team known as UCD Waves. A number of Peamount United players including Julie-Ann Russell, Aine O'Gorman, Karen Duggan, Dora Gorman, Chloe Mustaki and Emily Cahill all subsequently followed Gleeson to UCD Waves UCD student Ciara Grant also joined from Raheny United. In 2018 UCD withdrew from the WNL. DLR Waves was subsequently revived as a separate club, taking UCD Waves' place in the WNL.

== UCD in Europe ==
After winning the FAI Women's Cup, UCD qualified three times to represent the Republic of Ireland in the UEFA Women's Cup. After Shamrock Rovers, UCD were the second women's team to represent the Republic of Ireland in Europe.

2003–04 UEFA Women's Cup – Group B6

Pos	Team	Pld	W	D	L	GF	GA	GD	Pts	Qualification	KOL	JUV	WRO	UCD
1	(Norway) Kolbotn (H)	3	3	0	0	25	3	+22	9	Advance to quarter-finals	—	–	15–2	8–0
2	(France) Juvisy	3	2	0	1	10	3	+7	6		1–2	—	–	6–1
3	(Poland) AZS Wrocław	3	1	0	2	5	18	−13	3		–	0–3	—	–
4	(Republic of Ireland) University College Dublin	3	0	0	3	1	17	−16	0		–	–	0–3	—

Source: RSSSF
(H) Hosts

-->

21 August 2003	Juvisy (France)	6–1	(Republic of Ireland) University College Dublin	Kolbotn
	Bourdille 9', 70'; Tonazzi 42', 74'; Perraudeau 55', 58'	Report	Kissane 90'	Stadium: Sofiemyr stadion

23 August 2003	Kolbotn (Norway)	8–0	(Republic of Ireland) University College Dublin	Kolbotn
	Lindblom 4', 37'; Stensland 10'; Gulbrandsen 26'; Andersen 49', 57'; Stundal 71', 74'	Report	Kissane (yellow card) 72'	Stadium: Sofiemyr stadion

25 August 2003	University College Dublin (Republic of Ireland)	0–3	(Poland) AZS Wrocław	Drøbak
		Report	Białasek 43'; Otrębska 76'; Tarczyńska 90'	Stadium: Seiersten stadion

2004–05 UEFA Women's Cup – Group A9

Pos	Team	Pld	W	D	L	GF	GA	GD	Pts	Qualification	MON	NEU	DEZ	UCD
1	(France) Montpellier (H)	3	3	0	0	13	0	+13	9	Advance to second qualifying round	—	7–0	–	5–0
2	(Austria) Neulengbach	3	2	0	1	7	10	−3	6		–	—	–	4–2
3	(Portugal) 1.º de Dezembro	3	0	1	2	2	5	−3	1		0–1	1–3	—	–
4	(Republic of Ireland) University College Dublin	3	0	1	2	3	10	−7	1		–	–	1–1	—

Source: RSSSF
(H) Hosts

-->

20 July 2004	Montpellier (France)	5–0	(Republic of Ireland) University College Dublin	Vendargues
	Lattaf 16', 61'; Faisandier 31'; Ayachi 71'; Ramos 90+1'	Report	Stapleton (yellow card) 88'	Stadium: Stade Guillaume Didès

22 July 2004	University College Dublin (Republic of Ireland)	1–1	(Portugal) 1.º de Dezembro	Vendargues
	Connolly (yellow card) (yellow-red card) 82'; Callaghan (yellow card) 85'; Gee (yellow card) 89'; Sweeney 90+3'	Report	Couto 5'	Stadium: Stade Guillaume Didès

24 July 2004	Neulengbach (Austria)	4–2	(Republic of Ireland) University College Dublin	Montpellier
	Brand 33', 61'; Celouch 51'; Gajdošová 90+2'	Report	Kissane 26', 89'; Gee (yellow card) 40'; Gallagher (yellow card) 72'	Stadium: Stade Claude Béal

2005–06 UEFA Women's Cup – Group A2

Pos	Team	Pld	W	D	L	GF	GA	GD	Pts	Qualification	NEU	BAR	UCD	MAK
1	(Austria) Neulengbach	3	2	1	0	10	2	+8	7	Advance to second qualifying round	—	–	5–1	5–1
2	(Italy) Bardolino	3	2	1	0	5	0	+5	7		0–0	—	–	3–0
3	(Republic of Ireland) University College Dublin	3	1	0	2	3	7	−4	3		–	0–2	—	–
4	(Croatia) Maksimir (H)	3	0	0	3	1	10	−9	0		–	–	0–2	—

Source: RSSSF
(H) Hosts

-->

9 August 2009	Neulengbach (Austria)	5–1	(Republic of Ireland) University College Dublin	Zagreb
	Burger 3', 37'; Gstöttner 25'; Rosana 26'; Gajdosova (yellow card) 27'; Celouch 47'	Report	Waldron 17' (yellow card) 29'; Gee (yellow card) (yellow-red card) 86'	Stadium: Stadion Hitrec-Kacian

8 November 2005	University College Dublin (Republic of Ireland)	0–2	(Italy) Bardolino	Zagreb
	Waldron (yellow card) 15'	Report	Camporese (yellow card) 62'; Ficcarelli 67'; Brumana 87'	Stadium: Stadion Hitrec-Kacian

13 August 2005	Maksimir (Croatia)	0–2	(Republic of Ireland) University College Dublin	Zagreb
	Joscak (yellow card) 9'	Report	Cohalan 7'; Pasanec 30' (o.g.); Gee (yellow card) 45+1'; Murphy (yellow card) 58'; Kelly (yellow card) 75'; Kissane (yellow card) (yellow-red card) 90+2'	Stadium: Stadion Maksimir

== Notable former players ==
Republic of Ireland women's internationals

- Bernie O'Reilly
- (Republic of Ireland)
- Linda Greene
- (Republic of Ireland)

Katie Liston

- (Republic of Ireland) Marie Curtin
- (Republic of Ireland) Seana Cooke
- (Republic of Ireland) Karen Duggan
- (Republic of Ireland) Sinead Forde
- (Republic of Ireland) Sylvia Gee
- (Republic of Ireland) Dora Gorman
- (Republic of Ireland) Ciara Grant
- (Republic of Ireland) Carmel Kissane
- (Republic of Ireland) Siobhán Killeen
- (Republic of Ireland) Áine O'Gorman
- (Republic of Ireland) Louise Quinn
- (Republic of Ireland) Julie-Ann Russell
- (Republic of Ireland) Nicola Sinnott
- (Republic of Ireland) Caroline Thorpe
- (Republic of Ireland) Mary Waldron

Ireland women's field hockey international

- (Ireland) Emily Beatty

Ireland women's rugby union international

- (Ireland) Nora Stapleton

== Managers ==
- Ian Nesbitt 1991-2000
- Linda Greene 2000-2003 player/manager
- Jason Carey 2002-2003
- Pat Kavanagh 2003-2005
- Larry Mahony [2005–2008] [2011–2013]
- Eileen Gleeson 2014–2017
- Noel Kealy

== Honours ==
First Team

- FAI Women's Cup
  - Winners: 2002, 2003, 2004 : 3
  - Runners-up: 2006, 2014, 2017: 3
- Dublin Women's Soccer League
  - Winners: 2003, 2004, 2005, 2006: 4
  - Runners-up: 2002: 1
- DWSL Premier Cup
  - Winners: 2004, 2005, 2007 : 3
- Women's National League
  - Runners-up: 2014–15, 2016: 2
- WNL Cup
  - Runners-up: 2016: 1

Intervarsity

- LSCAI/WSCAI Premier Division
  - Winners: 1994–95, 1996–97, 1997–98, 2002–03, 2013–14: 5
  - Runners-up: 2012–13: 1
- LSCAI/WSCAI First Division
  - Winners: 1992–93, 2007–08: 2
- LSCAI/WSCAI Intervarsity Cup
  - Winners: 1994–95, 1996–97: 2
  - Runners-up: 1983, 1984, 2006–07, 2008–09 : 4
- LSCAI/WSCAI Intervarsity Challenge Cup
  - Winners: 2007–08: 1
- WSCAI Intervarsity Plate
  - Winners: 2001–02, 2002–03: 2
  - Runners-up: 2007–08, 2011–12 : 2
- UCG Galway Plate
  - Winners: 1996–97, 1995–96, 1994–95, 1993–94: 4
- WSCAI Futsal Cup
  - Winners: 2007–08, 2005–06, 2002–03, 2007–08, 2013–14: 6
