= Women's association football in the Republic of Ireland =

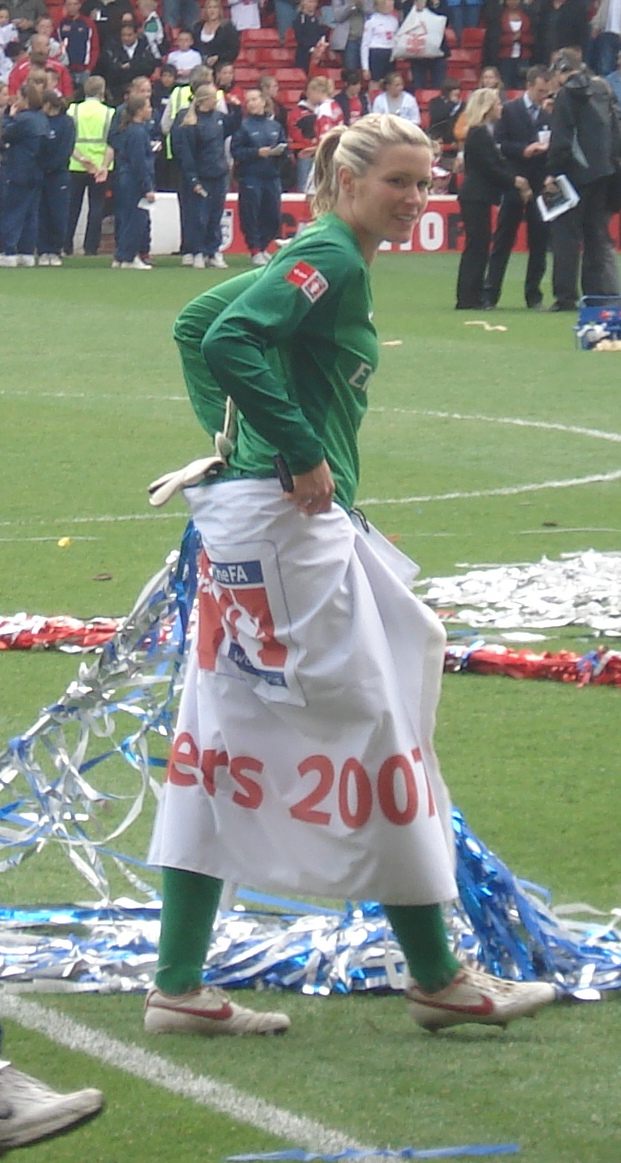
- Republic of Ireland international Emma Byrne after the 2007 FA Women's Cup final.
- Country: Ireland
- Governing body: Women's Football Association of Ireland
- National team: Republic of Ireland

National competitions
- Women's National League; FAI Women's Cup

Women's association football in the Republic of Ireland is governed by the Women's Football Association of Ireland. The WFAI organizes and manages the Republic of Ireland women's national football team, the FAI Women's Cup and the Women's National League as well as various county and regional leagues and junior cup competitions. The most notable county league is the Dublin Women's Soccer League. Organised women's association football has been played in the Republic of Ireland since at least the late 1960s and the national team has been active since 1973. Notable Republic of Ireland women's association footballers include Katie Taylor, Stephanie Roche and Emma Byrne. In addition to representing the Republic of Ireland at full international level, Taylor is also an Irish, European, World and Olympic boxing champion. In 2014 Roche was a FIFA Puskás Award nominee. Byrne is a prominent member of the Arsenal Ladies team.

== Timeline ==
Year/Season	Key events
1965	Benfica, one of the oldest women's association football clubs in the Republic of Ireland is founded in Waterford
1967	UCD play Dublin University in an early intervarsity women's game.
1973	The Women's Football Association of Ireland is established. On 22 April the Republic of Ireland women's national football team make their debut in a 10–1 defeat against Scotland.
1982	The Republic of Ireland make their competitive debut on 19 September in a European Competition for Women's Football qualifier. They lose 3–0 to Scotland.
1982	On 2 October the Republic of Ireland win their first competitive game when they defeat Northern Ireland 2–1 in a European Competition for Women's Football qualifier.
1983	Thomond College win the inaugural Intervarsity Cup, the women's equivalent of the Collingwood Cup.
1991	The WFAI affiliates with the Football Association of Ireland.
1994	Elm Rovers become first Dublin Women's Soccer League champions.
2000	The Republic of Ireland win the Celt Cup.
2002–03	Shamrock Rovers became the first women's team to represent the Republic of Ireland in Europe.
2005	The Republic of Ireland win their second level group in their UEFA Women's Euro 2005 qualification campaign.
2007	Emma Byrne and Ciara Grant play for Arsenal in the 2007 UEFA Women's Cup Final. They are the first two Republic of Ireland women's players to feature in a major European cup final. Ciara McCormack had been an unused substitute in 2003.
2010	The Republic of Ireland U-17s finish as runners-up in the UEFA Women's Under-17 Championship and as quarter-finalists in the FIFA U-17 Women's World Cup.
2011–12	Peamount United become the first Republic of Ireland team, including men's team, to qualify for the knockout stages of a European competition. They also become the inaugural winners of the Women's National League.
2013	The Republic of Ireland win their group at the 2013 Cyprus Cup.
2013	Stephanie Roche's goal for Peamount United goes viral on YouTube and is nominated for a FIFA Puskás Award.
2014	The Republic of Ireland team win their group at the 2014 UEFA Women's Under-19 Championship and qualify for the semi-finals.
2014–15	Raheny United become first Republic of Ireland club team, including men's teams, to win their group in a European competition.

== List of teams ==
=== Women's National League ===
Locations of Women's National League Teams
Locations of Women's National League Teams in Dublin

Team	Home town/suburb	Stadium	2021 finish
Athlone Town	Athlone	Athlone Town Stadium	7th
Bohemians	Dublin (Phibsborough)	Dalymount Park	6th
Cork City	Cork	Turners Cross	8th
DLR Waves	Dún Laoghaire	UCD Bowl	4th
Galway	Galway	Eamonn Deacy Park	5th
Peamount United	Newcastle, County Dublin	Greenogue	2nd
Shelbourne	Dublin (Drumcondra)	Tolka Park	1st
Sligo Rovers	Sligo	The Showgrounds	NA
Treaty United	Limerick	Markets Field	9th
Wexford Youths	Crossabeg	Ferrycarrig Park	3rd

=== Timeline ===
League member Former member Future member

=== Dublin Women's Soccer League ===
==== Premier League ====
Team	Home town/suburb	Ground
Bray Wanderers	Bray	Carlisle Grounds
Dundalk	Dundalk	Oriel Park
Sporting Kilmore	Coolock	Oscar Traynor Road
Monaghan United	Monaghan	Gortakeegan
Peamount United B	Newcastle, County Dublin	Greenogue
Raheny United	Raheny	St Anne's Park
St Francis	Baldonnel, County Dublin	John Hyland Park
St Catherine's	Walkinstown/The Liberties, Dublin	Walkinstown Avenue

==== Major League ====
Team	Home town/suburb	Ground
Albion Rovers	Monasterboice	Muireachs Park
Cabinteely	Cabinteely	Kilbogget Park
Drimnagh Celtic	Drimnagh	
Eureka Kells	Kells, County Meath	Dublin Road
Lakelands	Stillorgan	
Leixlip United	Leixlip	Leixlip Amenities Centre
Peamount United C	Newcastle, County Dublin	Greenogue
Templeogue	Templeogue	

=== Mayo Women's Football League ===
Premier Division - 2025 season

Team	Home town/suburb	Home ground
Castlebar Town	Castlebar	
Conn Rangers	Drumrevagh, Ballina	Mount Falcon
Manulla F.C.	Manulla, Balla	Carramore
Straide & Foxford United	Foxford & Straide	Green Road
Swinford F.C.	Swinford	James McEvaddy Park

== See also ==
- Geography of women's association football
