= St Catherine's L.F.C. =

Irish association football club

- Full name: St Catherine's Ladies Football Club
- Founded: 1980
- League: Dublin Women's Soccer League; North Dublin Schoolboys/Girls League
Home colours

St Catherine's Ladies Football Club is an Irish association football club originally based in St Catherine's Parish in the Liberties, Dublin. The club also plays home games in Walkinstown. St Catherine's have been FAI Women's Cup finalists on three occasions, winning the competition in 2011.

== History ==
St Catherine's was founded in 1980. Among the founder members was Brother Bernard Twomey, a member of the Order of Saint Augustine attached to St Catherine's Church. Brother Bernard later served the club as team manager. In 2001 St Catherine's played in their first FAI Women's Cup but lost to Shamrock Rovers. In the 2009 FAI Women's Cup, St Catherine's recorded victories over Galway, Lifford Ladies and the Cork Women's & Schoolgirls Soccer League before meeting St Francis in the final at Richmond Park. Katie Taylor was a member of the St Catherine's team this season but her boxing commitments sometimes restricted her appearances and she would miss the 2009 final. With a team that included Caroline Thorpe, St Catherine's lost 1–0 to a St Francis team that included Megan Campbell, Grainne Kierans and Mary Waldron.

The 2011 FAI Women's Cup saw St Catherine's knockout both the Cork Women's & Schoolgirls Soccer League and Raheny United before defeating Kilmacrennan Celtic 7–0 in the semi-final. In the final played at Turners Cross they faced Wilton United. St Catherine's claimed the cup with a dramatic 3–1 victory. Mary Waldron, now playing for St Catherine's, scored the opening goal in the 43rd minute before Noelle Murray doubled the score in the 77th minute with an astonishing volley. However, Wilton hit back in the closing moments of the game through Denise O'Sullivan but their late comeback was short lived as Murray ended the contest with another impressive strike in the 89th minute.

At the 2011–12 Women's National League Awards ceremony, Brother Bernard Twomey received the Services to Football Award. In addition to guiding St Catherine's to three FAI Women's Cup finals, Brother Bernard was recognised for dedicating his life to giving children the opportunity to play football at any level and for the important role he has played in the development of women's association football in the Republic of Ireland.

== Notable former players ==
Republic of Ireland women's internationals

- (Republic of Ireland) Noelle Murray
- (Republic of Ireland) Elaine O'Connor
- (Republic of Ireland) Olivia O'Toole
- (Republic of Ireland) Katie Taylor
- (Republic of Ireland) Caroline Thorpe
- (Republic of Ireland) Mary Waldron
- (Republic of Ireland) Michelle Walsh

Boxer

- (Republic of Ireland) Katie Taylor – Irish, European, World and Olympic boxing champion

Ireland women's rugby union international

- (Ireland) Hannah Tyrrell

== Honours ==
- Dublin Women's Soccer League
  - Runners-up: 2008: 1
- FAI Women's Cup
  - Winners: 2011: 1
  - Runners-up: 2001, 2009: 2
