= Benfica W.S.C. =

Irish association football club based in Waterford, Ireland

- Full name: Benfica Women's Soccer Club
- Founded: 1965
- Ground: Waterford Regional Sports Centre
- League: Ladies League of Ireland; Dublin Women's Soccer League; Munster Ladies League; Waterford District Girls League; Wexford and District League; Cork Ladies League
Home colours

Benfica Women's Soccer Club, previously known as Benfica L.F.C. and Mitsubishi Benfica, is an Irish association football club based in Waterford. Founded in 1965, Benfica are one of the oldest women's football clubs in the Republic of Ireland.

During the 1970s, 1980s and early 1990s they were also one of Ireland's leading women's clubs. They were founder members of the Ladies League of Ireland, played in the Dublin Women's Soccer League and were FAI Women's Cup finalists on at least five occasions.

== History ==
=== Early years ===
Benfica was formed in 1965 by Joey O'Callaghan and Sean Cuddihy. They were originally formed to enter a mixed factory five-a-side football competition and were named after S.L. Benfica, the club of Eusébio, the 1965 European Footballer of the Year, who was the founding members favourite player.

=== Leagues ===
During their history Benfica have fielded teams in various women's county, provincial and national leagues. They began playing in the Waterford Ladies League. In 1973 Benfica became founding members of the Ladies League of Ireland In 1987 when the national league was revived Benfica were again members. Other members included Cork Rangers, Cork Celtic, Greenpark (Limerick) and Dublin Castle. While playing in the Ladies League of Ireland during the 1980s, Benfica were sponsored by Mitsubishi. However the revived Ladies League of Ireland lasted just three seasons and was abandoned in 1989. Benfica subsequently joined the Cork Ladies League. During the early 1990s they played in the Munster Ladies League. During the early 2000s they fielded teams in both the Dublin Women's Soccer League and the Wexford and District League. As of September 2025, they field teams in the Waterford District Women & Schoolgirls League.

=== FAI Women's Cup ===
During the 1980s and early 1990s, Benfica played in at least five FAI Women's Cup finals, winning the competition three times. After losing the 1986 final to Dublin Castle, Benfica won the cup for the first time when they defeated Boyne Rovers 3–2 in the 1987 final at Dalymount Park. In the 1989 final they defeated Rathfarnham United 4–2 after extra time at The Farm. The Benfica team included Republic of Ireland internationals Eithne Hennessy, Siobhan Furlong, Yvonne Lyons and Therese Leahy. In the 1992 final they lost after a penalty shootout to Welsox at Dalymount Park. Benfica won the cup for the third time in 1993 in controversial circumstances. College Corinthians originally defeated Benfica 1–0 in the final. However a replay was held after it was discovered that Corinthians had fielded two unregistered players. In the replay, a fifteen year old Ciara Grant scored twice as Benfica won 3–0 at Kilcohan Park.

== Grounds ==
Benfica have played their home games at various grounds throughout Waterford. During the 1970s they played at Johnville Ground, St. John's Park. During the 1980s they played at Ozier Park, Poleberry. They have also played at Kilcohan Park and the Waterford Regional Sports Centre.

== Notable former players ==
=== Republic of Ireland women's internationals ===
- (Republic of Ireland) Kay Douglas
- (Republic of Ireland) Siobhan Furlong
- (Republic of Ireland) Sylvia Gee
- (Republic of Ireland) Ciara Grant
- (Republic of Ireland) Eithne Hennessy
- (Republic of Ireland) Cherelle Khassal
- (Republic of Ireland) Therese Leahy
- (Republic of Ireland) Yvonne Lyons
- (Republic of Ireland) Betty Maher
- (Republic of Ireland) Mary O'Callaghan
- (Republic of Ireland) Carol Breen
- (Republic of Ireland) Annette Doyle

== Honours ==
- FAI Women's Cup
  - Winners: 1987, 1989, 1993: 3
  - Runners-up: 1986, 1992: 2
