= Baldonnel, County Dublin =

Townland in South Dublin, site of the HQ of the Irish Air Corps

Baldonnel Baile Dhónaill (Irish)
- Townland
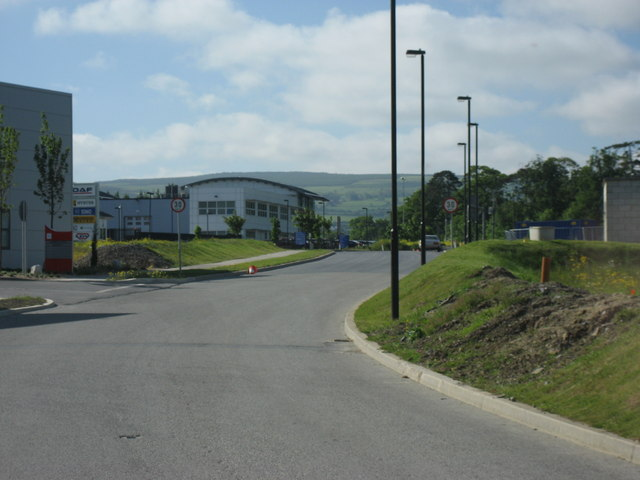
- Baldonnel Industrial Estate

- Location in Dublin
- Coordinates: 53°18′31″N 6°26′26″W
- Country: Ireland
- Province: Leinster
- County: County Dublin
- Local authority: South Dublin County Council

Baldonnel (Irish: Baile Dhónaill, meaning 'homestead of the O'Donnels') is a townland in County Dublin, Ireland. It is an agricultural and industrial area near Rathcoole, Clondalkin, Tallaght, Lucan, Saggart, Newcastle and Naas. It is around 15 km west of Dublin city centre.

The name Baldonnel, from the Irish Baile Dhónaill, derives from the name of former landowners in the area. The earliest written record of the name comes from a 1717 deed for Baldonnell, which lists alternate spellings of Baldownan, Balldonnan, and Ballydonnell. Two surviving local houses (the oldest to the north of Baldonnel Airfield, and the newest further east in the same area) claim the name Baldonnell House, and the ruins of the original house are located to the east of the airfield.

The River Camac flows through the townland before flowing by way of Corkagh Park to join the River Liffey.

== See also ==
- Casement Aerodrome, also known as "Baldonnel Aerodrome" or "Baldonnel Airfield", is an Irish Air Corps base in the area
