= Ciara Grant (footballer, born 1978) =

Irish footballer (born 1978)

Ciara Ludlow
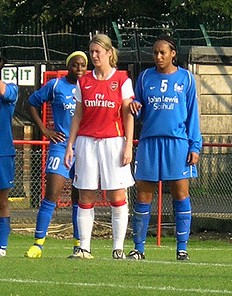
- Grant (centre) playing for Arsenal in 2006

Personal information
- Full name: Ciara Mary Ludlow
- Birth name: Ciara Mary Grant
- Date of birth: 17 May 1978 (age 48)
- Place of birth: Waterford, Ireland
- Height: 1.73 m (5 ft 8 in)
- Position: Midfielder

Senior career*
Years	Team	Apps	(Gls)
19xx–19xx	Benfica		
19xx–1998	St Patrick's Athletic Ladies		
1998–2014	Arsenal	403	
2014	Reading	4	(0)

International career
1995–2012	Republic of Ireland	105	(11)
- * Club domestic league appearances and goals

Ciara Mary Ludlow (née Grant; born 17 May 1978) is an Irish former footballer who played as a midfielder. She played club football for Arsenal L.F.C. and internationally for the Republic of Ireland national team. Ludlow was a nine-time winner of the Women's FA Cup.

== Club career ==
Ciara Mary Grant was born in Waterford. She began her career with Benfica. After a spell with St Patrick's Athletic, she joined Arsenal Ladies in August 1998. She was employed as a development officer by the English club.

In her first season Grant scored an equaliser against Everton as Arsenal won the Premier League Cup final 3–1. Arsenal also won the 1999 FA Women's Cup, but finished second to Croydon in the League. In the following campaign Arsenal and Grant retained the Premier League Cup, but lost in the FA Women's Cup semi-final and came third in the League. In 2000–01 Arsenal completed a domestic treble, with Grant providing an assist for the decisive goal in the FA Women's Cup final win over Fulham.

That achievement was eclipsed in 2007, as Arsenal added the UEFA Women's Cup to their trophy haul, completing an unprecedented quadruple. Grant remained an important part of the team while being converted from a midfielder to a central defender.

Grant won the FA Women's Cup with Arsenal again in 2008, 2009, 2011 and 2013. The victory in 2013 was her ninth win in the competition. In the 2012-13 season Arsenal also won the Continental League Cup.

After moving to Reading in 2014, Grant announced her retirement in April 2015.

== International career ==
Grant has reached a century of caps for Ireland and, since 2000, has captained the national side. She made her debut as a teenager, in a 3–1 win over the Faroe Islands at Richmond Park.

She won her 100th cap in Ireland's 2–1 defeat to Scotland at Tynecastle Stadium in April 2012.

Grant announced her retirement from international football in February 2013.

== Honours ==
Arsenal

- FA Women's Premier League National Division (9): 2000–01, 2001–02, 2003–04, 2004–05, 2005–06, 2006–07, 2007–08, 2008–09, 2009–10
- FA Women's Cup (9): 1998–99, 2000–01, 2003–04, 2005–06, 2006–07, 2007–08, 2008–09, 2010‍–‍11, 2012‍–‍13
- Women's League Cup (6): 1998–99, 1999–2000, 2000–01, 2004–05, 2006–07, 2007–08
- UEFA Women's Cup: 2007

== Personal life ==
Grant married former Arsenal teammate Jayne Ludlow, adopting her name.
