= Susan Ronan =

Irish footballer and coach

Personal information
- Date of birth: 21 February 1964 (age 62)
- Place of birth: Ireland

Senior career*
| Years | Team | Apps | (Gls) |
- Welsox
- Shelbourne

International career
| 1988 | Ireland | | |

Managerial career
- 2010–2016: Ireland
- * Club domestic league appearances and goals

Susan Ronan (born 21 February 1964) is an Irish football coach and former player, who managed the Republic of Ireland women's national football team from 2010 until 2016.

Ronan represented Welsox and Shelbourne at club level, and made her debut as a player for Ireland in 1988. She won 22 caps and was named FAI Women's Player of the Year in 1993.

In October 2010 she succeeded Noel King as head coach of the senior Republic of Ireland women's national football team. She stood down from the position in 2016, to take a role as the Football Association of Ireland's head of women's football. She had obtained a UEFA Pro Licence in 2015.
