= FAI Women's Cup =

Irish football tournament

Women's FAI Cup
- Organiser(s): Women's Football Association of Ireland
- Founded: 1975
- Region: Republic of Ireland
- Teams: 16 (2025)
- Current champions: Athlone Town (2nd title)
- Most championships: Dublin Castle, Castle Rovers/ Shamrock Rovers (6 titles each)
- Website: FAI Women's Cup at fai.ie
- 2026 FAI Women's Cup

The Football Association of Ireland Women's Cup is the senior cup competition for women's association football in Ireland. It is commonly known as the Women's FAI Cup, the WFAI Cup, or prior to 2001, the Ladies FAI Cup or the LFAI Cup. Organised by the Women's Football Association of Ireland, like the Women's National League, the Cup is currently sponsored by Club Orange and is known as the Club Orange Women's FAI Cup. Previous sponsors include Sports Direct, EVOKE.ie, Continental Tyres, Umbro and Brother International.

== History ==
=== Antecedents ===
Two reports in the Kilkenny People suggest that Evergreen (Kilkenny) defeated Avengers (Dublin) in a 1973 final. Two 1974 articles in the Irish Independent and Sunday Independent report that Anne O'Brien won the Drumcondra Cup with All-Stars (Dublin) in 1972. A 1985 article in the Munster Express, marking Benfica's twenty year anniversary, claims the club first played in a national Cup as early as in 1968.

=== Early years ===
Although the RSSSF archives only list finals from 1989, a match programme from a 1978 international between the Republic of Ireland and France confirmed that the Ladies FAI Cup was first played for in 1975 with Limerick defeating C.S.O. (Dublin) 2–1 in the final. Records from the early 1980s are more clear and during this period the three strongest teams were Dublin Castle, Benfica and Rathfarnham United. The former two clubs were both members of the Ladies League of Ireland. Dublin Castle was founded in the mid-1970s as a works team by Margaret Griffin, a former camogie player from Ennis, County Clare who later became a Republic of Ireland international. At the time Griffin was working for the Irish Revenue Commissioners based at Dublin Castle.

Benfica won the cup for the third time in 1993 in controversial circumstances. College Corinthians originally defeated Benfica 1–0 in the final. However a replay was held after it was discovered that Corinthians had fielded two unregistered players. In the replay, a fifteen year old Ciara Grant scored twice as Benfica won 3–0 at Kilcohan Park.

=== DWSL monopoly ===
Following the emergence of the Dublin Women's Soccer League in 1993, its member clubs, most notably Shamrock Rovers and UCD, dominated the competition. This monopoly was briefly broken in 2006 and 2007 by the representative teams of two regional women's leagues. A team representing the Mayo Ladies League defeated UCD in the 2006 final and in 2007 the Galway Ladies League defeated Raheny United. Between 2008 and 2011 the DWSL dominance was restored with victories by St Francis, Peamount United and St. Catherine's.

=== UEFA Women's Cup ===
Between 2001 and 2010 the FAI Women's Cup served as a qualifier for the UEFA Women's Cup. In 2002–03, after winning the 2001 cup, Shamrock Rovers became the first women's team to represent the Republic of Ireland in Europe. UCD became the second Republic of Ireland team to qualify for Europe after winning the cup. UCD played in the 2003–04, 2004–05 and 2005–06 UEFA Women's Cups. The Mayo Ladies League, the Galway Ladies League, St Francis and Peamount United all represented the Republic of Ireland in Europe after winning the cup.

In 2005 Dundalk City won the FAI Women's Cup and as a result qualified for the 2006–07 UEFA Women's Cup. However, in 2006 a split developed within Dundalk City over a plan for the club to fully merge with Dundalk F.C. This saw the emergence of two separate women's teams. Dundalk City was re-established as an independent club while Dundalk W.F.C. became affiliated with the League of Ireland club. Following complications that resulted from the split, it was Dundalk W.F.C. that went on to represent the Republic of Ireland in the UEFA Women's Cup.

=== Women's National League era ===
The establishment of the Women's National League in 2011–12 led to a revamp for the FAI Women's Cup. Played between August and November, it serves as a warm up competition for the WNL season. Between 2013 and 2019 the final was staged as part of double header at the Aviva Stadium along with the men's FAI Cup final. This idea had previously been tried out in 2004 and 2005 when Lansdowne Road hosted both finals on the same day. Since 2013 the final has also been broadcast live on RTÉ Two. In 2015 the double header system caused controversy when the FAI Women's Cup final went to extra-time and penalties. During the penalty shoot-out, Cork City F.C. players began their warm up preparations for the men's FAI Cup on the pitch.

From the 2020 season onwards, the final was staged at Tallaght Stadium on a separate day to the men's final.

There were 15 teams competing in the 2024 season. In 2025, the competition was expanded to 16 teams.

== List of finals ==
Date	Winner	Score	Runners-up	Venue
1975	Limerick	2–1	C.S.O. (Dublin)	
1976	Dublin Castle		Waterford	
1977	Suffragettes		Avengers (Dublin)	
1978	Dublin Castle		Green Angels (Dublin)	
1979	Dublin Castle		Avengers (Dublin)	
1980	Suffragettes	4–1	Rathfarnham United	
1981	Suffragettes (Note: Suffragettes and Rathfarnham United were the finalists.)		Rathfarnham United	
10 October 1982	Dublin Castle	5–0	Cork Celtic	Waterford Glass Sports Centre
1983	Glade Celtic	2–0	Dublin Castle	Belfield Park
1984	Dublin Castle	2-2 (Note: Dublin Castle won on penalties.)	Killeady/Cork Rangers	
8 September 1985	Rathfarnham United	2–2 (a.e.t.)	Belvedere	Hogan Park, Rathbane
Replay (9 Oct 1985)	Rathfarnham United	2–0	Belvedere	Dalymount Park
24 August 1986	Dublin Castle	1–0	Benfica	Janesboro FC (Limerick)
1987	Benfica	3–2	Boyne Rovers	Dalymount Park
25 September 1988	Rathfarnham United	2–0	Boyne Rovers	Balbriggan
10 September 1989	Benfica	4–2 (a.e.t.)	Rathfarnham United (Note: RSSSF lists Boyne Rovers as the runners-up. However a report in The Munster Express identifies Rathfarnham United as the runners-up. The same report also identifies Rathfarnham United as the previous years winners.)	The Farm
1990	Rathfarnham United		Boyne Rovers	
6 October 1991	Rathfarnham United	3–1	Belvedere	Dalymount Park
1992	Welsox		Benfica	Dalymount Park
26 September 1993	College Corinthians	1–0	Benfica	Pike Rovers F.C.
Replay (21 Nov 1993)	Benfica	3–0 (Note: Replay held after Corinthians had fielded two unregistered players in first game.)	College Corinthians	Kilcohan Park
25 September 1994	Welsox	4–0	Verona FC	Richmond Park
27 August 1995	Rathfarnham United	3–0	College Corinthians	Oscar Traynor Centre
25 August 1996	Castle Rovers	3–0	O'Connell Chics	Richmond Park
24 August 1997	Shamrock Rovers	4–0	Shelbourne	Iveagh Grounds
6 September 1998	Shamrock Rovers	10–3	Listowel Celtic	Newcastle, Co Dublin
29 August 1999	Shamrock Rovers	2–0	Shelbourne	AUL Complex
20 August 2000	Shamrock Rovers	7–0	Bealnamulla	AUL Complex
29 July 2001	Shamrock Rovers	3–1	St. Catherine's	AUL Complex
1 September 2002	UCD	2–1	Shamrock Rovers	Verona FC, Coolmine
10 August 2003	UCD	2–0	Lifford (Clare)	Richmond Park
24 October 2004	UCD	4–1	Dundalk City	Lansdowne Road
16 October 2005	Dundalk City	1–0	Peamount United	Lansdowne Road
2 December 2006	Mayo Ladies League	1–0	UCD	Richmond Park
14 October 2007	Galway Ladies League	1–0	Raheny United	Dalymount Park
22 November 2008	St Francis	2–1	Peamount United	Richmond Park
25 July 2009	St Francis	1–0	St. Catherine's	Richmond Park
25 July 2010	Peamount United	4–2	Salthill Devon	Tolka Park
7 August 2011	St. Catherine's	3–1	Wilton United	Turners Cross
13 October 2012	Raheny United	2–1	Peamount United	Dalymount Park
3 November 2013	Raheny United	3–2 (a.e.t.)	Castlebar Celtic	Aviva Stadium
2 November 2014	Raheny United	2–1 (a.e.t.)	UCD Waves	Aviva Stadium
8 November 2015	Wexford Youths	2–2 (Note: Wexford Youths won 4–2 on penalties.)	Shelbourne	Aviva Stadium
6 November 2016	Shelbourne	5–0	Wexford Youths	Aviva Stadium
5 November 2017	Cork City	1–0	UCD Waves	Aviva Stadium
4 November 2018	Wexford Youths	1–0	Peamount United	Aviva Stadium
3 November 2019	Wexford Youths	3–2	Peamount United	Aviva Stadium
12 December 2020	Peamount United	6–0	Cork City	Tallaght Stadium
21 November 2021	Wexford Youths	3–1	Shelbourne	Tallaght Stadium
6 November 2022	Shelbourne	2–0	Athlone Town	Tallaght Stadium
19 November 2023	Athlone Town	2–2 (Note: Athlone won 4–3 on penalties.)	Shelbourne	Tallaght Stadium
20 October 2024	Shelbourne	6–1	Athlone Town	Tallaght Stadium
19 October 2025	Athlone Town	3–2	Bohemians	Tallaght Stadium
27 September 2026	Shelbourne	3–1	Athlone Town	Tallaght Stadium

=== List of winners by club ===
Dublin Castle and Castle Rovers/Shamrock Rovers have won the cup the most times, each winning the competition six times.

Wins	Team	Seasons
6	Dublin Castle (Note: An Irish Examiner report on 1982 final states that 1982 was third time Dublin Castle had won cup but does not identify the earlier years.)	1976, 1978, 1979, 1982, 1984, 1986
6	Castle Rovers/Shamrock Rovers	1996, 1997, 1998, 1999, 2000, 2001
5	Rathfarnham United	1985, 1988, 1990, 1991, 1995
4	Wexford Youths	2015, 2018, 2019, 2021
4	Shelbourne	2016, 2022, 2024, 2026
3	Benfica	1987, 1989, 1995
3	UCD	2002, 2003, 2004
3	Raheny United	2012, 2013, 2014
2	Athlone Town	2023, 2025
2	Peamount United	2010, 2020
2	Welsox	1992, 1994
2	St Francis	2008, 2010
1	Limerick	1975
1	Glade Celtic	1983
1	Dundalk City	2005
1	Mayo Ladies League	2006
1	Galway Ladies League	2007
1	St. Catherine's	2011
1	Cork City	2017
