= 2014 Cyprus Women's Cup squads =

List of players competing at the 7th edition of the Cyprus Women's Cup

This article lists the squads for the 2014 Cyprus Women's Cup, the 7th edition of the Cyprus Women's Cup. The cup consisted of a series of friendly games, and was held in Cyprus from 5 to 12 March 2014. The twelve national teams involved in the tournament registered a squad of 23 players.

The age listed for each player is on 5 March 2014, the first day of the tournament. The numbers of caps and goals listed for each player do not include any matches played after the start of tournament. The club listed is the club for which the player last played a competitive match prior to the tournament. The nationality for each club reflects the national association (not the league) to which the club is affiliated. A flag is included for coaches that are of a different nationality than their own national team.

== Group A ==
=== Canada ===
Coach: (England) John Herdman

The squad was announced on 24 February 2014. On 4 March 2014, Lauren Sesselmann suffered a cruciate ligament injury in training and withdrew from the squad, and two days later was replaced by Quinn. (Note: Then known as Rebecca Quinn)

No.	Pos.	Player	Date of birth (age)	Club
1	GK	Erin McLeod	26 February 1983 (aged 31)	(United States Soccer Federation) Houston Dash
2	DF	Emily Zurrer	12 July 1987 (aged 26)	(Swedish Football Association) Jitex
3	FW	Nkem Ezurike	19 March 1992 (aged 21)	(United States Soccer Federation) Boston Breakers
4	DF	Carmelina Moscato	2 May 1984 (aged 29)	(United States Soccer Federation) Seattle Reign
5	DF	Robyn Gayle	31 October 1985 (aged 28)	(United States Soccer Federation) Washington Spirit
6	MF	Kaylyn Kyle	6 October 1988 (aged 25)	(United States Soccer Federation) Boston Breakers
7	DF	Rhian Wilkinson	12 May 1982 (aged 31)	Unattached
8	MF	Diana Matheson	6 April 1984 (aged 29)	(United States Soccer Federation) Washington Spirit
9	FW	Josée Bélanger	14 May 1986 (aged 27)	Unattached
10	MF	Quinn	11 August 1995 (aged 18)	(United States Soccer Federation) Duke Blue Devils
11	MF	Desiree Scott	31 July 1987 (aged 26)	(The Football Association) Notts County Ladies
12	FW	Christine Sinclair (captain)	12 June 1983 (aged 30)	(United States Soccer Federation) Portland Thorns
13	MF	Sophie Schmidt	28 June 1984 (aged 29)	(United States Soccer Federation) Sky Blue
14	DF	Kadeisha Buchanan	5 November 1995 (aged 18)	(United States Soccer Federation) West Virginia Mountaineers
15	DF	Rachel Quon	21 May 1991 (aged 22)	(United States Soccer Federation) Chicago Red Stars
17	MF	Brittany Baxter	5 September 1985 (aged 28)	Unattached
19	FW	Adriana Leon	2 October 1992 (aged 21)	(United States Soccer Federation) Chicago Red Stars
20	DF	Marie-Ève Nault	16 February 1982 (aged 32)	(Swedish Football Association) Örebro
21	GK	Stephanie Labbé	10 October 1986 (aged 27)	(Swedish Football Association) Örebro
33	GK	Karina LeBlanc	30 March 1980 (aged 33)	(United States Soccer Federation) Chicago Red Stars

=== England ===
Coach: (Wales) Mark Sampson

The squad was announced on 12 February 2014. On 26 February, Karen Bardsley and Rachel Brown-Finnis withdrew due to injuries and were replaced by Lizzie Durack and Carly Telford.

No.	Pos.	Player	Date of birth (age)	Club
1	GK	Siobhan Chamberlain	15 August 1983 (aged 30)	(The Football Association) Arsenal
2	DF	Alex Scott	14 October 1984 (aged 29)	(The Football Association) Arsenal
3	DF	Demi Stokes	12 December 1991 (aged 22)	(United States Soccer Federation) South Florida Bulls
4	MF	Anita Asante	27 April 1985 (aged 28)	(Swedish Football Association) Rosengård
5	DF	Lucy Bronze	28 October 1991 (aged 22)	(The Football Association) Liverpool
6	DF	Steph Houghton	23 April 1988 (aged 25)	(The Football Association) Manchester City
7	FW	Karen Carney	1 August 1987 (aged 26)	(The Football Association) Birmingham City
8	MF	Fara Williams (captain)	25 January 1984 (aged 30)	(The Football Association) Liverpool
9	FW	Lianne Sanderson	3 February 1988 (aged 26)	(United States Soccer Federation) Boston Breakers
10	MF	Jordan Nobbs	8 December 1992 (aged 21)	(The Football Association) Arsenal
11	FW	Toni Duggan	25 July 1991 (aged 22)	(The Football Association) Manchester City
12	MF	Jade Moore	22 October 1990 (aged 23)	(The Football Association) Birmingham City
13	GK	Carly Telford	7 July 1987 (aged 26)	(The Football Association) Notts County
14	DF	Laura Bassett	2 August 1983 (aged 30)	(The Football Association) Chelsea
15	DF	Gemma Bonner	13 July 1991 (aged 22)	(The Football Association) Liverpool
16	DF	Sophie Bradley	20 October 1989 (aged 24)	(The Football Association) Notts County
17	FW	Gemma Davison	17 April 1987 (aged 26)	(The Football Association) Liverpool
18	MF	Jill Scott	2 February 1987 (aged 27)	(The Football Association) Manchester City
19	FW	Natasha Dowie	30 June 1988 (aged 25)	(The Football Association) Liverpool
20	FW	Ellen White	9 May 1989 (aged 24)	(The Football Association) Notts County
21	GK	Lizzie Durack	20 May 1994 (aged 19)	(United States Soccer Federation) Harvard Crimson
22	FW	Eniola Aluko	21 February 1987 (aged 27)	(The Football Association) Chelsea
23	DF	Alex Greenwood	7 September 1993 (aged 20)	(The Football Association) Everton
24	FW	Kelly Smith	29 October 1978 (aged 35)	(The Football Association) Arsenal

=== Finland ===
Coach: (Sweden) Andrée Jeglertz

No.	Pos.	Player	Date of birth (age)	Club
1	GK	Minna Meriluoto	4 October 1985 (aged 28)	(Swedish Football Association) Vittsjö
3	DF	Tuija Hyyrynen	10 March 1988 (aged 25)	(Swedish Football Association) Umeå
4	DF	Susanna Lehtinen	8 May 1983 (aged 30)	(Swedish Football Association) Örebro
5	DF	Katarina Naumanen	24 July 1995 (aged 18)	(Football Association of Finland) Pallokissat
6	DF	Laura Kivistö	26 June 1981 (aged 32)	(Football Association of Finland) PK-35 Vantaa
7	MF	Annika Kukkonen (captain)	12 April 1990 (aged 23)	(Swedish Football Association) Örebro
8	MF	Katri Nokso-Koivisto	22 November 1982 (aged 31)	(Football Association of Finland) PK-35 Vantaa
10	MF	Emmi Alanen	30 April 1991 (aged 22)	(Swedish Football Association) Umeå
11	DF	Nora Heroum	20 July 1994 (aged 19)	(Football Association of Finland) Åland United
12	GK	Vera Varis	20 January 1994 (aged 20)	(Football Association of Finland) Honka
13	MF	Heidi Kivelä	6 November 1988 (aged 25)	(Football Association of Finland) PK-35 Vantaa
14	FW	Sanna Talonen	15 June 1984 (aged 29)	(Swedish Football Association) Örebro
15	FW	Juliette Kemppi	14 May 1994 (aged 19)	(Football Association of Finland) Åland United
16	DF	Anna Westerlund	9 April 1989 (aged 24)	(Norwegian Football Federation) LSK Kvinner
17	FW	Sanna Saarinen	4 September 1991 (aged 22)	(Football Association of Finland) PK-35 Vantaa
18	FW	Sanna Ylianttila	24 April 1991 (aged 22)	(Football Association of Finland) ONS
19	FW	Adelina Engman	11 October 1994 (aged 19)	(Football Association of Finland) Åland United
20	FW	Linda Ruutu	17 February 1990 (aged 24)	(Football Association of Finland) PK-35 Vantaa
21	FW	Ella Vanhanen	15 September 1993 (aged 20)	(Football Association of Finland) Åland United
22	DF	Jenna Korhonen	1 July 1988 (aged 25)	(Football Association of Finland) PK-35 Vantaa
23	GK	Tinja-Riikka Korpela	5 May 1986 (aged 27)	(Swedish Football Association) Tyresö

=== Italy ===
Coach: Antonio Cabrini

The squad was announced on 24 February 2014. Valentina Cernoia withdrew from the squad and was replaced by Marta Carissimi.

No.	Pos.	Player	Date of birth (age)	Club
1	GK	Sara Penzo	16 December 1989 (aged 24)	(Italian Football Federation) Tavagnacco
2	DF	Elisa Bartoli	7 May 1991 (aged 22)	(Italian Football Federation) Torres
3	DF	Roberta D'Adda	5 October 1981 (aged 32)	(Italian Football Federation) Brescia
4	MF	Alessia Tuttino	15 March 1983 (aged 30)	(Italian Football Federation) Tavagnacco
5	DF	Raffaella Manieri	21 November 1986 (aged 27)	(German Football Association) Bayern Munich
6	DF	Elena Linari	15 April 1994 (aged 19)	(Italian Football Federation) Brescia
7	FW	Sandy Iannella	6 April 1987 (aged 26)	(Italian Football Federation) Torres
8	FW	Melania Gabbiadini	28 August 1983 (aged 30)	(Italian Football Federation) Verona
9	FW	Patrizia Panico	8 February 1975 (aged 39)	(Italian Football Federation) Torres
10	MF	Martina Rosucci	9 May 1992 (aged 21)	(Italian Football Federation) Brescia
11	MF	Elisa Camporese	16 March 1984 (aged 29)	(Italian Football Federation) Tavagnacco
12	GK	Laura Giuliani	5 June 1993 (aged 20)	(German Football Association) Herforder SV
13	DF	Federica Di Criscio	12 May 1993 (aged 20)	(Italian Football Federation) Verona
14	FW	Ilaria Mauro	22 May 1988 (aged 25)	(German Football Association) SC Sand
15	MF	Giulia Nasuti	11 May 1985 (aged 28)	(Italian Football Federation) Brescia
16	MF	Marta Carissimi	3 May 1987 (aged 26)	(Italian Football Federation) Inter Milan
17	FW	Paola Brumana	26 November 1982 (aged 31)	(Italian Football Federation) Tavagnacco
18	FW	Silvia Fuselli	1 July 1981 (aged 32)	(Italian Football Federation) Torres
19	DF	Nenè Nhaga Bissoli	10 October 1987 (aged 26)	(Italian Football Federation) Tavagnacco
20	MF	Giulia Domenichetti	29 April 1984 (aged 29)	(Italian Football Federation) Torres
21	FW	Cristiana Girelli	23 April 1990 (aged 23)	(Italian Football Federation) Brescia
22	GK	Arianna Criscione	18 February 1985 (aged 29)	(Italian Football Federation) Torres
23	DF	Cecilia Salvai	2 December 1993 (aged 20)	(Italian Football Federation) Verona

== Group B ==
=== Australia ===
Coach: (Netherlands) Hesterine de Reus

The squad was announced on 24 February 2014.

No.	Pos.	Player	Date of birth (age)	Club
1	GK	Brianna Davey	13 January 1995 (aged 19)	(Football Australia) Melbourne Victory
2	DF	Teigen Allen	12 February 1994 (aged 20)	(Football Australia) Western Sydney Wanderers
3	DF	Kim Carroll	2 September 1987 (aged 26)	(Football Australia) Brisbane Roar
4	DF	Hannah Brewer	16 April 1993 (aged 20)	(Football Australia) Newcastle Jets
5	DF	Laura Alleway	28 November 1989 (aged 24)	(Football Australia) Brisbane Roar
6	FW	Leena Khamis	19 June 1986 (aged 27)	(Football Australia) Sydney FC
7	DF	Emma Checker	11 March 1996 (aged 17)	(Football Australia) Melbourne Victory
8	MF	Elise Kellond-Knight	10 August 1990 (aged 23)	(Football Australia) Brisbane Roar
9	FW	Caitlin Foord	11 November 1994 (aged 19)	(Football Australia) Sydney FC
10	MF	Emily van Egmond	12 July 1993 (aged 20)	(Football Australia) Western Sydney Wanderers
11	DF	Gema Simon	19 July 1990 (aged 23)	(Football Australia) Newcastle Jets
12	FW	Kate Gill (captain)	10 December 1984 (aged 29)	(Football Australia) Perth Glory
13	MF	Tameka Butt	16 June 1991 (aged 22)	(Football Australia) Brisbane Roar
14	DF	Alanna Kennedy	21 January 1995 (aged 19)	(Football Australia) Western Sydney Wanderers
15	MF	Nicola Bolger	3 March 1993 (aged 21)	(Football Australia) Sydney FC
16	DF	Steph Catley	26 January 1994 (aged 20)	(Football Australia) Melbourne Victory
17	FW	Hayley Raso	5 September 1994 (aged 19)	(Football Australia) Brisbane Roar
18	GK	Lydia Williams	13 May 1988 (aged 25)	(Football Australia) Canberra United
19	MF	Katrina Gorry	13 August 1992 (aged 21)	(Football Australia) Brisbane Roar
20	FW	Sam Kerr	10 September 1993 (aged 20)	(Football Australia) Sydney FC
21	GK	Casey Dumont	25 January 1992 (aged 22)	(Football Australia) Sydney FC
22	MF	Chloe Logarzo	22 December 1994 (aged 19)	(Football Australia) Sydney FC
23	FW	Michelle Heyman	4 July 1988 (aged 25)	(Football Australia) Canberra United

=== France ===
Coach: Philippe Bergeroo

No.	Pos.	Player	Date of birth (age)	Club
1	GK	Céline Deville	24 January 1982 (aged 32)	(French Football Federation) Juvisy
2	DF	Wendie Renard	20 July 1990 (aged 23)	(French Football Federation) Lyon
3	DF	Laure Boulleau	22 October 1986 (aged 27)	(French Football Federation) Paris Saint-Germain
4	DF	Laura Georges	20 August 1984 (aged 29)	(French Football Federation) Paris Saint-Germain
5	DF	Sabrina Delannoy (captain)	18 May 1986 (aged 27)	(French Football Federation) Paris Saint-Germain
6	MF	Amandine Henry	28 September 1989 (aged 24)	(French Football Federation) Lyon
7	DF	Corine Franco	5 October 1983 (aged 30)	(French Football Federation) Lyon
8	MF	Jessica Houara	29 September 1987 (aged 26)	(French Football Federation) Paris Saint-Germain
9	FW	Eugénie Le Sommer	18 May 1989 (aged 24)	(French Football Federation) Lyon
10	MF	Camille Abily	5 December 1984 (aged 29)	(French Football Federation) Lyon
11	FW	Laëtitia Tonazzi	31 January 1981 (aged 33)	(French Football Federation) Lyon
12	FW	Élodie Thomis	13 August 1986 (aged 27)	(French Football Federation) Lyon
13	FW	Camille Catala	6 May 1991 (aged 22)	(French Football Federation) Juvisy
14	MF	Louisa Cadamuro	23 January 1987 (aged 27)	(French Football Federation) Lyon
15	MF	Élise Bussaglia	24 September 1985 (aged 28)	(French Football Federation) Lyon
16	GK	Sarah Bouhaddi	17 October 1986 (aged 27)	(French Football Federation) Lyon
17	MF	Gaëtane Thiney	28 October 1985 (aged 28)	(French Football Federation) Juvisy
18	FW	Marie-Laure Delie	29 January 1988 (aged 26)	(French Football Federation) Paris Saint-Germain
19	FW	Marina Makanza	1 July 1991 (aged 22)	(French Football Federation) Montpellier
20	DF	Griedge Mbock Bathy	26 February 1995 (aged 19)	(French Football Federation) Guingamp
21	GK	Laëtitia Philippe	30 April 1991 (aged 22)	(French Football Federation) Montpellier
22	MF	Amel Majri	25 January 1993 (aged 21)	(French Football Federation) Lyon
23	MF	Kheira Hamraoui	13 January 1990 (aged 24)	(French Football Federation) Paris Saint-Germain
24	FW	Viviane Asseyi	20 November 1993 (aged 20)	(French Football Federation) Montpellier

=== Netherlands ===
Coach: Roger Reijners

No.	Pos.	Player	Date of birth (age)	Club
1	GK	Angela Christ	6 March 1989 (aged 24)	(Royal Dutch Football Association) PSV/FC Eindhoven
2	DF	Kika van Es	11 October 1991 (aged 22)	(Royal Dutch Football Association) PSV/FC Eindhoven
3	DF	Stefanie van der Gragt	16 August 1992 (aged 21)	(Royal Dutch Football Association) Telstar
4	DF	Mandy van den Berg (captain)	26 August 1990 (aged 23)	(Swedish Football Association) Vittsjö
5	DF	Siri Worm	20 April 1992 (aged 21)	(Royal Dutch Football Association) Twente
6	MF	Anouk Dekker	15 November 1986 (aged 27)	(Royal Dutch Football Association) Twente
7	FW	Manon Melis	31 August 1986 (aged 27)	(Swedish Football Association) Kopparbergs/Göteborg
8	MF	Sherida Spitse	29 May 1990 (aged 23)	(Norwegian Football Federation) LSK Kvinner
9	FW	Vivianne Miedema	15 July 1996 (aged 17)	(Royal Dutch Football Association) Heerenveen
10	MF	Renée Slegers	5 February 1989 (aged 25)	(Swedish Football Association) Linköping
11	MF	Lieke Martens	16 December 1992 (aged 21)	(Swedish Football Association) Kopparbergs/Göteborg
12	DF	Dyanne Bito	10 August 1981 (aged 32)	(Royal Dutch Football Association) Telstar
13	DF	Kim Dolstra	4 November 1988 (aged 25)	(Royal Dutch Football Association) ADO Den Haag
14	DF	Kelly Zeeman	19 November 1993 (aged 20)	(Royal Dutch Football Association) Ajax
15	DF	Petra Hogewoning	26 March 1986 (aged 27)	(Royal Dutch Football Association) Ajax
16	GK	Barbara Lorsheyd	26 March 1991 (aged 22)	(Royal Dutch Football Association) ADO Den Haag
17	MF	Tessel Middag	23 December 1992 (aged 21)	(Royal Dutch Football Association) Ajax
18	DF	Maayke Heuver	26 July 1990 (aged 23)	(Royal Dutch Football Association) Twente
19	FW	Marlous Pieëte	19 July 1989 (aged 24)	(Royal Dutch Football Association) Twente
20	DF	Claudia van den Heiligenberg	25 March 1985 (aged 28)	(Royal Dutch Football Association) Ajax
21	DF	Dominique Janssen	17 January 1995 (aged 19)	(German Football Association) SGS Essen
22	FW	Mandy Versteegt	23 February 1990 (aged 24)	(Royal Dutch Football Association) Ajax
23	GK	Sari van Veenendaal	3 April 1990 (aged 23)	(Royal Dutch Football Association) Twente
24	MF	Desiree van Lunteren	30 December 1992 (aged 21)	(Royal Dutch Football Association) Ajax

=== Scotland ===
Coach: (Sweden) Anna Signeul

The squad was announced on 25 February 2014. Megan Sneddon and Heather Richards were later added to the squad.

No.	Pos.	Player	Date of birth (age)	Club
1	GK	Gemma Fay (captain)	9 December 1981 (aged 32)	(Scottish Football Association) Celtic
2	DF	Emma Black	12 March 1987 (aged 26)	(Scottish Football Association) Glasgow City
3	DF	Emma Mitchell	19 September 1992 (aged 21)	(The Football Association) Arsenal
4	DF	Ifeoma Dieke	25 February 1981 (aged 33)	(Swedish Football Association) Vittsjö
5	MF	Leanne Ross	8 July 1981 (aged 32)	(Scottish Football Association) Glasgow City
6	MF	Joanne Love	6 December 1985 (aged 28)	(Scottish Football Association) Glasgow City
7	FW	Hayley Lauder	4 June 1990 (aged 23)	(Swedish Football Association) Vittsjö
8	MF	Kim Little	29 June 1990 (aged 23)	(United States Soccer Federation) Seattle Reign
9	MF	Megan Sneddon	9 September 1985 (aged 28)	(Scottish Football Association) Rangers
10	DF	Jennifer Beattie	13 May 1991 (aged 22)	(French Football Federation) Montpellier
11	FW	Lisa Evans	21 May 1992 (aged 21)	(German Football Association) Turbine Potsdam
12	GK	Shannon Lynn	22 October 1985 (aged 28)	(Scottish Football Association) Hibernian
13	FW	Jane Ross	18 September 1989 (aged 24)	(Swedish Football Association) Vittsjö
14	DF	Rachel Corsie	17 August 1989 (aged 24)	(The Football Association) Notts County
15	DF	Joelle Murray	7 November 1986 (aged 27)	(Scottish Football Association) Hibernian
16	MF	Christie Murray	3 May 1990 (aged 23)	(The Football Association) Arsenal
17	DF	Frankie Brown	8 October 1987 (aged 26)	(Scottish Football Association) Hibernian
18	DF	Nicola Docherty	23 August 1992 (aged 21)	(Scottish Football Association) Glasgow City
19	FW	Lana Clelland	26 January 1993 (aged 21)	(Scottish Football Association) Spartans
20	FW	Heather Richards	16 February 1994 (aged 20)	(Scottish Football Association) Celtic

== Group C ==
=== Ireland ===
Coach: Susan Ronan

The squad was announced on 19 February 2014. Before travelling to Cyprus, Grace Moloney withdrew from the squad due to a back injury and was replaced by Emma Hansberry.

No.	Pos.	Player	Date of birth (age)	Club
1	GK	Emma Byrne (captain)	14 June 1979 (aged 34)	(The Football Association) Arsenal
2	MF	Emma Hansberry	26 May 1994 (aged 19)	(Football Association of Ireland) Castlebar Celtic
3	DF	Megan Campbell	28 June 1993 (aged 20)	(United States Soccer Federation) Florida State Seminoles
4	DF	Louise Quinn	17 June 1990 (aged 23)	(Swedish Football Association) Eskilstuna United
6	MF	Dora Gorman	18 February 1993 (aged 21)	(Football Association of Ireland) Peamount United
7	DF	Diane Caldwell	11 September 1988 (aged 25)	(Norwegian Football Federation) Avaldsnes
8	FW	Ruesha Littlejohn	3 July 1990 (aged 23)	(Scottish Football Association) Glasgow City
9	FW	Fiona O'Sullivan	17 September 1986 (aged 27)	(German Football Association) SC Freiburg
10	FW	Denise O'Sullivan	4 February 1994 (aged 20)	(Scottish Football Association) Glasgow City
11	MF	Julie-Ann Russell	28 March 1991 (aged 22)	(Football Association of Ireland) Peamount United
14	MF	Shannon Smyth	22 June 1987 (aged 26)	(Norwegian Football Federation) Amazon Grimstad
15	DF	Méabh De Búrca	11 August 1988 (aged 25)	(Football Association of Ireland) Galway
17	FW	Áine O'Gorman	13 May 1989 (aged 24)	(Football Association of Ireland) Peamount United
18	MF	Rachel Graham	18 July 1989 (aged 24)	(Football Association of Ireland) Raheny United
19	DF	Karen Duggan	29 May 1991 (aged 22)	(Football Association of Ireland) Peamount United
20	MF	Ciara Grant	11 June 1993 (aged 20)	(Football Association of Ireland) Raheny United
21	FW	Stephanie Roche	13 June 1989 (aged 24)	(Football Association of Ireland) Peamount United
22	MF	Aileen Gilroy	1 March 1993 (aged 21)	(Football Association of Ireland) Castlebar Celtic
23	GK	Niamh Reid Burke	6 August 1991 (aged 22)	(Football Association of Ireland) Raheny United
24	MF	Siobhán Killeen	21 September 1995 (aged 18)	(Football Association of Ireland) Raheny United
	MF	Niamh Fahey	13 October 1987 (aged 26)	(The Football Association) Arsenal
	DF	Sophie Perry	11 November 1986 (aged 27)	(The Football Association) Millwall
	DF	Yvonne Tracy	27 February 1981 (aged 33)	(The Football Association) Arsenal

=== New Zealand ===
Coach: (England) Tony Readings

The squad was announced on 26 February 2014.

No.	Pos.	Player	Date of birth (age)	Club
1	GK	Erin Nayler	17 April 1992 (aged 21)	(New Zealand Football) Eastern Suburbs
2	DF	Ria Percival	7 December 1989 (aged 24)	(German Football Association) USV Jena
3	DF	CJ Bott	22 April 1995 (aged 18)	(New Zealand Football) Waterside Karori
4	MF	Katie Hoyle	1 February 1988 (aged 26)	(The Football Association) Notts County
5	DF	Abby Erceg (captain)	20 November 1989 (aged 24)	(German Football Association) USV Jena
6	DF	Rebekah Stott	17 June 1993 (aged 20)	(German Football Association) SC Sand
9	FW	Amber Hearn	28 November 1984 (aged 29)	(German Football Association) USV Jena
10	FW	Sarah Gregorius	6 August 1987 (aged 26)	Unattached
11	MF	Kirsty Yallop	4 November 1986 (aged 27)	(Swedish Football Association) Vittsjö
12	MF	Betsy Hassett	4 August 1990 (aged 23)	(The Football Association) Manchester City
13	FW	Rosie White	6 June 1993 (aged 20)	(United States Soccer Federation) UCLA Bruins
15	DF	Meikayla Moore	4 June 1996 (aged 17)	(New Zealand Football) Coastal Spirit
16	MF	Annalie Longo	1 July 1991 (aged 22)	(New Zealand Football) Three Kings United
17	FW	Hannah Wilkinson	28 May 1992 (aged 21)	(United States Soccer Federation) Tennessee Volunteers
18	DF	Katie Bowen	15 April 1995 (aged 18)	(United States Soccer Federation) North Carolina Tar Heels
19	MF	Evie Millynn	23 November 1994 (aged 19)	(United States Soccer Federation) San Diego State Aztecs
20	FW	Helen Collins	3 October 1988 (aged 25)	(New Zealand Football) Claudelands Rovers
23	GK	Lily Alfeld	4 August 1995 (aged 18)	(New Zealand Football) Coastal Spirit
25	FW	Stephanie Skilton	27 October 1994 (aged 19)	(United States Soccer Federation) Syracuse Orange
26	DF	Megan Lee	7 February 1995 (aged 19)	(United States Soccer Federation) LSU Tigers

=== South Korea ===
Coach: Yoon Deok-yeo

The squad was announced on 20 February 2014. Four days later, Kim Do-yeon withdrew and was replaced by Ahn Hye-in.

No.	Pos.	Player	Date of birth (age)	Club
1	GK	Kim Jung-mi	16 October 1984 (aged 29)	(Korea Football Association) Hyundai Steel Angels
2	DF	Seo Hyun-sook	6 January 1992 (aged 22)	(Korea Football Association) Icheon Daekyo
3	DF	Lim Seon-joo	27 November 1990 (aged 23)	(Korea Football Association) Hyundai Steel Angels
4	DF	Ahn Hye-in	16 October 1995 (aged 18)	(Korea Football Association) Chungnam High School
5	DF	Lee Eun-mi	18 August 1988 (aged 25)	(Korea Football Association) Icheon Daekyo
6	DF	Song Su-ran	7 September 1990 (aged 23)	(Korea Football Association) Sejong Sportstoto
7	MF	Kim Soo-yun	30 August 1989 (aged 24)	(Korea Football Association) Hwacheon KSPO
8	MF	Cho So-hyun (captain)	24 June 1988 (aged 25)	(Korea Football Association) Hyundai Steel Angels
9	FW	Yoo Young-a	15 April 1988 (aged 25)	(Korea Football Association) Hyundai Steel Angels
10	FW	Ji So-yun	21 February 1991 (aged 23)	(The Football Association) Chelsea
11	FW	Park Hee-young	21 March 1991 (aged 22)	(Korea Football Association) Sejong Sportstoto
12	MF	Kwon Hah-nul	7 March 1988 (aged 25)	(Korea Football Association) Boeun Sangmu
13	MF	Kim Ah-reum	7 August 1993 (aged 20)	(Korea Football Association) Icheon Daekyo
14	MF	Jeoun Eun-ha	28 January 1993 (aged 21)	(Korea Football Association) Hwacheon KSPO
15	DF	Eo Hee-jin	21 March 1991 (aged 22)	(Korea Football Association) Seoul City
16	DF	Shin Dam-yeong	2 October 1993 (aged 20)	(Korea Football Association) Suwon FC
17	FW	Yeo Min-ji	27 April 1993 (aged 20)	(Korea Football Association) Sejong Sportstoto
18	MF	Lee So-dam	12 October 1994 (aged 19)	(Korea Football Association) Ulsan National Institute of Science and Technology
19	MF	Jang Sel-gi	31 May 1994 (aged 19)	(Korea Football Association) Gangwon State University
20	DF	Kim Hye-ri	25 June 1990 (aged 23)	(Korea Football Association) Hyundai Steel Angels
21	GK	Jun Min-kyung	16 January 1985 (aged 29)	(Korea Football Association) Icheon Daekyo
22	FW	Choe Yu-ri	16 September 1994 (aged 19)	(Korea Football Association) Ulsan National Institute of Science and Technology

=== Switzerland ===
Coach: (Germany) Martina Voss-Tecklenburg

No.	Pos.	Player	Date of birth (age)	Club
1	GK	Gaëlle Thalmann	18 January 1986 (aged 28)	(Italian Football Federation) Torres
2	GK	Stenia Michel	23 October 1987 (aged 26)	(German Football Association) USV Jena
3	GK	Nicole Studer	22 February 1996 (aged 18)	(Swiss Football Association) Zürich
4	DF	Caroline Abbé (captain)	13 January 1988 (aged 26)	(German Football Association) SC Freiburg
5	MF	Eseosa Aigbogun	23 May 1993 (aged 20)	(Swiss Football Association) Basel
6	FW	Ramona Bachmann	25 December 1990 (aged 23)	(Swedish Football Association) Rosengård
7	DF	Vanessa Bernauer	23 March 1988 (aged 25)	(German Football Association) BV Cloppenburg
8	FW	Fabienne Bangerter	21 September 1991 (aged 22)	(Swiss Football Association) Basel
9	DF	Sandra Betschart	30 March 1989 (aged 24)	(Swedish Football Association) Sunnanå
10	MF	Vanessa Bürki	1 April 1986 (aged 27)	(German Football Association) Bayern Munich
11	FW	Ana-Maria Crnogorčević	3 October 1990 (aged 23)	(German Football Association) FFC Frankfurt
12	FW	Lara Dickenmann	27 November 1985 (aged 28)	(French Football Federation) Lyon
13	MF	Fabienne Humm	20 December 1986 (aged 27)	(Swiss Football Association) Zürich
14	MF	Florijana Ismaili	1 January 1995 (aged 19)	(Swiss Football Association) Young Boys
15	DF	Rahel Kiwic	5 January 1991 (aged 23)	(Swiss Football Association) Zürich
16	DF	Selina Kuster	8 August 1991 (aged 22)	(Swiss Football Association) Grasshopper
17	MF	Sandy Maendly	4 April 1988 (aged 25)	(Italian Football Federation) Torres
18	DF	Noelle Maritz	23 December 1995 (aged 18)	(German Football Association) VfL Wolfsburg
19	MF	Martina Moser	9 April 1986 (aged 27)	(German Football Association) 1899 Hoffenheim
20	MF	Carmen Pulver	18 September 1995 (aged 18)	(Swiss Football Association) Grasshopper
21	DF	Nicole Remund	31 December 1989 (aged 24)	(Swiss Football Association) Zürich
22	DF	Danique Stein	16 July 1990 (aged 23)	(Swiss Football Association) Basel
23	MF	Lia Wälti	19 April 1993 (aged 20)	(German Football Association) Turbine Potsdam

== Player representation ==
Statistics are per the beginning of the competition.

=== By club ===
Clubs with 5 or more players represented are listed.

Players	Club
12	(France) Lyon
9	(England) Arsenal
8	(Italy) Torres
6	(Australia) Brisbane Roar, (Australia) Sydney FC, (England) Notts County, (Finland) PK-35 Vantaa, (France) Paris Saint-Germain, (Netherlands) Ajax, (Scotland) Glasgow City, (Sweden) Vittsjö
5	(England) Liverpool, (Republic of Ireland) Peamount United, (Italy) Brescia, (Italy) Tavagnacco, (Netherlands) Twente, (South Korea) Hyundai Steel Angels, (Sweden) Örebro

=== By club nationality ===
Players	Clubs
31	England
26	France
24	United States
23	Australia
22	Italy, Sweden
21	South Korea
18	Germany, Netherlands
13	Finland, Scotland
12	(Republic of Ireland) Ireland
10	Switzerland
6	New Zealand
4	Norway

=== By club federation ===
Players	Federation
191	UEFA
24	CONCACAF
44	AFC
6	OFC

=== By representatives of domestic league ===
National squad	Players
France	24
Australia	23
South Korea	21
England	20
Italy	20
Netherlands	18
Finland	13
Republic of Ireland	12
Scotland	11
Switzerland	10
New Zealand	6
Canada	0
