= 2013 FAI Women's Cup final =

- Event: 2013 FAI Women's Cup
Raheny United	Castlebar Celtic
3	2
- After extra time
- Date: 3 November 2013
- Venue: Aviva Stadium, Dublin
- Player of the Match: Caroline Thorpe
- Referee: Marie Ward (Dublin)
- Attendance: 200–17,573

The 2013 FAI Women's Cup final was the final match of the 2013 FAI Women's Cup, the national association football Cup of the Republic of Ireland. The match took place on 3 November 2013 at the Aviva Stadium in Dublin. Raheny United and Castlebar Celtic contested the match.

The match was shown live on RTÉ2 and RTÉ2 HD in Ireland and was refereed by Marie Ward, assisted by Deirdre Nolan and Olivia Syned with Natasha Valenti as Fourth Official. The Referee Observer was Victor Loughman.

Raheny United won the Cup to retain the trophy they won for the first time the previous year. Underdogs Castlebar Celtic equalised twice to force extra time but were unable to come back a third time after conceding an own goal.

== Background ==
The two managers were already acquainted, as Raheny's Terry Eviston had previously been in charge of Athlone Town when Castlebar's Adrian Carberry had been a player at the League of Ireland club.

Carberry was barred from the technical area at the Aviva Stadium because he was an employee of the Football Association of Ireland. His request for a one-off dispensation was refused, so he took his place in the stand and his assistant Maz Sweeney directed operations from pitch-side.

All the Castlebar Celtic players wore the name Jeremy on the back of their shirts, as a mark of respect to their former manager Jeremy Dee whose untimely death occurred in November 2012.

As Cup holders, reigning Women's National League champions and undefeated League-leaders, Raheny United entered the match as strong favourites. Two weeks previously they had beaten Castlebar Celtic's comparatively youthful team 9–2 in a League fixture.

Castlebar Celtic were without Shauna Jackson due to an injured ankle. Deirdre Doherty had missed recent fixtures while attending college in England, but Castlebar retained her registration and she agreed to come back to play in the match. Seana Cooke had agreed a transfer from Raheny United to Durham in the week leading up to the match.

== Match ==
=== Summary ===
As the match was played as a curtain raiser to the 2013 FAI Cup Final between Drogheda United and Sligo Rovers, it began with a "small crowd" of around 200 which expanded to a reported attendance of 17,573 in time for the men's final.

Raheny took control of possession in the early exchanges and forced Castlebar's 16-year-old goalkeeper Caoimhe O'Reilly into action. Raheny took the lead after 37 minutes when Ciara Grant hit a half volley over O'Reilly and into the net.

Castlebar continued to yield the territorial advantage but tried to hit Raheny on the break, usually through their skilful playmaker Emma Hansberry. On 67 minutes Sarah Rowe made a foray up the right wing and found Hansberry, who played the ball inside for substitute Emma Mullin to score the equaliser.

On 84 minutes Raheny went back ahead when Caroline Thorpe was controversially adjudged to have been fouled by Castlebar's young goalkeeper, and scored the resultant penalty kick herself. Castlebar equalised again in the last minute of normal time, when another substitute Deirdre Doherty fired a powerful long-range shot past Niamh Reid Burke.

The standard 15-minutes each-way of extra-time was unexpectedly abridged to ten minutes each-way. Five minutes into the additional period Castlebar's centre-back Kim Flood inadvertently headed Siobhán Killeen's cross past O'Reilly and into her own goal. The luckless Flood was later carried off with an injury, replaced by Rachel Kearns.

During the presentation of the trophy to victorious Raheny captain Becky Creagh, Sligo Rovers players intruded on the pitch to begin their warm up.

Experienced midfielder Caroline Thorpe was named Player of the Match by RTÉ summariser Susan Ronan. Thorpe later revealed that she had been bereaved by the death of her brother and was in the grip of anorexia nervosa at the time.

=== Details ===
3 November 2013
12:20 BST

Raheny United	3–2 (a.e.t.)	Castlebar Celtic
Grant 37'; Thorpe 84' (pen.); Flood 95' (o.g.)	Report	Mullin 67'; Doherty 89'

Aviva Stadium, Dublin
Attendance: 200
Referee: Marie Ward (Dublin)

Raheny	Castlebar

GK	1	(Republic of Ireland) Niamh Reid Burke
RB	2	(Republic of Ireland) Pearl Slattery
CB	5	(Republic of Ireland) Kerry Ryan
CB	6	(Republic of Ireland) Rachel Graham
LB	3	(Republic of Ireland) Sinead O'Farrelly	(substituted off) 90'
RM	11	(Republic of Ireland) Siobhan Killeen
CM	4	(Republic of Ireland) Caroline Thorpe
CM	8	(Republic of Ireland) Ciara Grant
LM	9	(Republic of Ireland) Katie McCabe	(substituted off) 68'
FW	7	(Republic of Ireland) Rebecca Creagh (c)
FW	10	(Republic of Ireland) Noelle Murray
Substitutions:
FW	12	(Republic of Ireland) Clare Shine	(substituted in) 68'
DF	13	(Republic of Ireland) Shauna Newman	(substituted in) 91'
GK		(Republic of Ireland) Bethany Houldsworth
DF		(Republic of Ireland) Kate Flood
FW		(Republic of Ireland) Catherine Cronin
DF		(Republic of Ireland) Christina Byrne
DF		(Republic of Ireland) Niamh Walsh
Manager:
(Republic of Ireland) Terry Eviston

GK	1	(Republic of Ireland) Caoimhe O'Reilly
RB	15	(Republic of Ireland) Katie Walsh (c)
CB	4	(Republic of Ireland) Kim Flood	(substituted off) 109'
CB	5	(Republic of Ireland) Aisling Egan
LB	3	(Republic of Ireland) Nicole Fowley
RM	7	(Republic of Ireland) Yvonne Hedigan	(substituted off) 76'
CM	10	(Republic of Ireland) Emma Hansberry
LM	6	(Republic of Ireland) Rachel King
RW	7	(Republic of Ireland) Sarah Rowe
CF	9	(Republic of Ireland) Sarah McGeogh	(substituted off) 45'
LW	12	(Republic of Ireland) Aileen Gilroy
Substitutions:
FW	14	(Republic of Ireland) Emma Mullin	(substituted in) 47'
FW	8	(Republic of Ireland) Deirdre Doherty	(substituted in) 76'
FW	11	(Republic of Ireland) Rachel Kearns	(substituted in) 109'
FW		(Republic of Ireland) Maz Sweeney
DF		(Republic of Ireland) Trish Moran
DF		(Republic of Ireland) Niamh Kerins
MF		(Republic of Ireland) Trisha Coyle
Manager:
(Republic of Ireland) Adrian Carberry

Match officials

- Assistant referees:
  - Deirdre Nolan
  - Olivia Syned
- Fourth official: Natasha Valentini

Match rules

- 90 minutes.
- 20 minutes of extra time if necessary.
- Penalty shoot-out if scores level.
- Five substitutes named.
- Maximum of three substitutions.
