= Deirdre Doherty =

Irish footballer

Personal information
- Date of birth: 14 March 1991 (age 35)
- Height: 1.70 m (5 ft 7 in)
- Position: Forward

College career
| Years | Team | Apps | (Gls) |
| 2009–2013 | IT Sligo | | |

Senior career*
| Years | Team | Apps | (Gls) |
- Ballyglass
| 2013 | Castlebar Celtic | | |

International career^{‡}
| 2013 | Republic of Ireland | 3 | (0) |
- * Club domestic league appearances and goals as of 00:03, 20 December 2020 (UTC) ‡ National team caps and goals as of 00:03, 20 December 2020 (UTC)

Deirdre Doherty (born 14 March 1991) is an Irish dual code footballer who has played soccer for Women's National League (WNL) club Castlebar Celtic and the Republic of Ireland women's national team. She has also played inter county ladies' Gaelic football for her native Mayo, competing in the Ladies' National Football League and All-Ireland Senior Ladies' Football Championship.

== Club career ==
Doherty is from Charlestown, County Mayo and played soccer at the Institute of Technology, Sligo. She was named 2011 Intervarsity Player of the Year, after Sligo finished as runners-up to the University of Limerick. In September 2011, Doherty scored in Ballyglass's 3–1 FAI Women's Intermediate Cup final win over Raheny United. She helped Sligo win the Irish Universities Premier League in 2012 and 2013.

For the 2013–14 season of the Women's National League (WNL), Doherty joined County Mayo club Castlebar Celtic. On her debut she scored twice in a 7–0 win at Lifford Ladies in the quarter-final of the FAI Women's Cup on 7 September 2013. A league debut followed in a 4–2 win over Shamrock Rovers at Celtic Park, Castlebar, on 15 September. On 29 September she scored the second goal in a 2–0 FAI Women's Cup semi final win over Wexford Youths, touching in club captain Emma Hansberry's free kick. Doherty's first league goal for Celtic came on 13 October 2013, in a 2–0 home win over DLR Waves.

In the 2013 FAI Women's Cup Final at the Aviva Stadium, Doherty scored a "spectacular" late equaliser for the underdogs Castlebar Celtic, but they eventually lost 3–2 to Raheny United after extra time. Doherty had agreed to play in the final even though she had moved to the United Kingdom to continue her studies.

== International career ==
=== Youth ===
In February 2010, while a first year Health Science and Physiology student at the Institute of Technology, Sligo, Doherty was called up to the Republic of Ireland women's national under-19 football team panel. Still enrolled at Institute of Technology, Sligo, Doherty represented Ireland at the 2013 Summer Universiade in Kazan, Russia. She scored against Mexico in a 4–2 defeat.

=== Senior ===
In February 2013 Republic of Ireland women's national team coach Susan Ronan called up Doherty for the 2013 Cyprus Cup, as a replacement for Fiona O'Sullivan who had sustained a knee injury. Ronan said: "Deirdre was called into the U19 squad a few years ago but had to withdraw because of injury but I have kept an eye on her and she has been very impressive for Sligo IT this season". Doherty won her first senior cap in a 0–0 draw with South Korea, staged in Paralimni on 11 March 2013. She entered play as a 66th-minute substitute for Sara Lawlor. Two days later she made another appearance, replacing Lawlor in the 67th minute of a 1–0 defeat by Finland.

Doherty retained her place in the squad for Ireland's next match, and appeared as a 91st-minute substitute for Ruesha Littlejohn as Ireland recovered from 2–0 down to draw 2–2 in a friendly with Austria at Tallaght Stadium, Dublin, in June 2013.

== Gaelic football ==
Doherty played Gaelic football for Institute of Technology, Sligo, as well as the Charlestown LGFA club. Alongside her future Castlebar Celtic teammates Sarah Rowe and Aileen Gilroy, Doherty was part of a young County Mayo GAA team which won Division Two of the Ladies' National Football League in 2012, then reached the Division One final the following year.

In 2018 Doherty played for the Roger Casements GAA club from Coventry, who won the all-Britain junior championship. She was named to the 2018 Warwickshire GAA All-Star team. Doherty returned to the Mayo squad for the 2020 All-Ireland Senior Ladies' Football Championship.
