= FAI International Football Awards =

Sports awards

- Awarded for: Outstanding achievements in association football
- Sponsored by: Three
- Location: RTÉ Television Centre, Donnybrook
- Country: Ireland
- Presented by: Peter Collins; Tony O'Donoghue; Evanne Ní Chuilinn
- First award: 1989
- Website: fai.ie

Television/radio coverage
- Network: RTÉ Two

The FAI International Football Awards is an awards evening held to honour the best Republic of Ireland international footballers of the year.

== Senior International awards ==
=== Senior International Player of the Year ===
Year	Winner	Club
2024	Robbie Brady	Preston North End
2023	Chiedozie Ogbene	Ipswich Town
2022	Nathan Collins	Burnley/Wolverhampton Wanderers
2021	Josh Cullen	Anderlecht
2020	John Egan	Sheffield United
2019	David McGoldrick	Sheffield United
2018	Shane Duffy	Brighton & Hove Albion
2017	Shane Duffy	Brighton & Hove Albion
2016	Robbie Brady	Norwich City/Burnley
2015	Jonathan Walters	Stoke City
2014	John O'Shea	Sunderland
2013	Robbie Keane	LA Galaxy
2012	Keith Andrews	Bolton Wanderers
2011	Richard Dunne	Aston Villa
2010	Kevin Doyle	Wolverhampton Wanderers
2009	Robbie Keane	Liverpool/Tottenham Hotspur
2008	Kevin Doyle	Reading
2007	Richard Dunne	Manchester City
2006	Shay Given	Newcastle United
2005	Shay Given	Newcastle United
2004	Kevin Kilbane	Everton
2003	No award ceremony.	
2002	Damien Duff	Blackburn Rovers
2001	Roy Keane	Manchester United
2000	Mark Kinsella	Charlton Athletic
1999	Alan Kelly	Sheffield United/Blackburn Rovers
1998	Kenny Cunningham	Wimbledon
1997	Roy Keane	Manchester United
1996	Alan McLoughlin	Portsmouth
1995	Andy Townsend	Aston Villa
1994	Ray Houghton	Aston Villa
1993	Steve Staunton	Aston Villa
1992	John Aldridge	Tranmere Rovers
1991	Paul McGrath	Aston Villa
1990	Paul McGrath	Aston Villa
1989	Kevin Moran	Sporting Gijón

=== Senior Women's International Player of the Year ===
Year	Winner	Club
2024	Kyra Carusa	San Diego Wave
2023	Courtney Brosnan	Everton
2022	Courtney Brosnan	Everton
2021	Katie McCabe	Arsenal
2020	Denise O'Sullivan	Brighton & Hove Albion (on loan from North Carolina Courage)
2019	Louise Quinn	Arsenal
2018	Leanne Kiernan	West Ham United
2017	Harriet Scott	Reading
2016	Karen Duggan	UCD Waves
2015	Denise O'Sullivan	Glasgow City
2014	Julie-Ann Russell	UCD Waves
2013	Louise Quinn	Eskilstuna United
2012	Emma Byrne	Arsenal Ladies
2011	Niamh Fahey	Arsenal Ladies
2010	Fiona O'Sullivan	AIK Stockholm
2009	Niamh Fahey	Arsenal Ladies
2008	Niamh Fahey	Arsenal Ladies
2007	Emma Byrne	Arsenal Ladies
2006	Alisha Moran	Harvard University
2005	Michele O'Brien	Long Island Lady Riders
2004	Elaine O'Connor	Hofstra Pride
2003	No award ceremony.	
2002	Yvonne Tracy	Arsenal Ladies
2001	Olivia O'Toole	Shamrock Rovers
2000	Ciara Grant	Arsenal Ladies
1999	Claire Scanlan	Troy University
1998	Yvonne Lyons	Benfica
1997	Bernie Reilly	Shamrock Rovers

=== International Goal of the Year ===
Year	Winner	Opposition
2024	Robbie Brady	Finland
2023	Katie McCabe	Canada (Women's)
2022	Amber Barrett	Scotland (Women's)
2021	Troy Parrott	Lithuania
2020	Ellen Molloy	Iceland (Women's U17)
2019	Troy Parrott	Sweden (U21)
2018	Aiden O'Brien	Poland
2017	James McClean	Wales
2016	Robbie Brady	Italy
2015	Shane Long	Germany
2014	Aiden McGeady	Georgia
2013	Shane Long	England
2012	Kevin Doyle	Kazakhstan
2011	Darron Gibson	Wales
2010	Kevin Doyle	Andorra
2009	Robbie Keane	France
2008	Andy Keogh	Serbia
2007	Kevin Doyle	Slovakia
2006	Kevin Kilbane	Czech Republic
2005	Robbie Keane	Israel
2004	Robbie Keane	Netherlands

=== Young International Player of the Year ===
Year	Winner	Club
2024	Finn Azaz	Middlesbrough
2023	Evan Ferguson	Brighton & Hove Albion
2022	Evan Ferguson	Brighton & Hove Albion
2021	Gavin Bazunu	Rochdale/Portsmouth
2020	Dara O'Shea	West Bromwich Albion
2019	Alan Browne	Preston North End
2018	Declan Rice	West Ham United
2017	Cyrus Christie	Derby County/Middlesbrough
2016	Robbie Brady	Norwich City/Burnley
2015	Robbie Brady	Hull City/Norwich City
2014	Jeff Hendrick	Derby County
2013	James McCarthy	Everton
2012	James McCarthy	Wigan Athletic
2011	Darren O'Dea	Leeds United (on loan from Celtic)
2010	Shane Long	Reading
2009	Darron Gibson	Manchester United
2008	Aiden McGeady	Celtic
2007	Stephen Ireland	Manchester City
2006	Kevin Doyle	Reading
2005	Stephen Elliott	Sunderland
2004	Andy Reid	Nottingham Forest
2003	No award ceremony.	
2002	Steven Reid	Millwall
2001	Damien Duff	Blackburn Rovers
2000	Richard Dunne	Everton/Manchester City
1999	Robbie Keane	Wolverhampton Wanderers/Coventry City
1998	Robbie Keane	Wolverhampton Wanderers
1997	David Connolly	Watford/Feyenoord
1996	Shay Given	Blackburn Rovers
1995	Jeff Kenna	Southampton/Blackburn Rovers
1994	Roy Keane	Manchester United
1993	Roy Keane	Nottingham Forest/Manchester United
1992	Terry Phelan	Wimbledon/Manchester City
1991	John Connolly	Bohemians
1990	Niall Quinn	Arsenal/Manchester City
1989	Steve Staunton	Liverpool

=== Women's Young International Player of the Year ===
Year	Winner	Club
2024	Jessie Stapleton	Sunderland
2023	Heather Payne	Everton
2022	Heather Payne	Florida State Seminoles

== Youth International ==
=== Under-21 International Player of the Year ===
Year	Winner	Club
2024	Matt Healy	Francs Borains
2023	Andrew Moran	Brighton & Hove Albion/Blackburn Rovers
2022	Will Smallbone	Southampton/Stoke City
2021	Conor Coventry	West Ham United/Peterborough United
2020	Jack Taylor	Peterborough United
2019	Lee O'Connor	Manchester United/Celtic
2018	Ronan Curtis	Portsmouth
2017	Josh Cullen	West Ham United
2016	Callum O'Dowda	Oxford United/Bristol City
2015	Alan Browne	Preston North End
2014	Jack Grealish	Aston Villa
2013	Sean Murray	Watford
2012	Robbie Brady	Hull City
2011	Robbie Brady	Hull City (on loan from Manchester United)
2010	Seamus Coleman	Everton
2009	Seamus Coleman	Everton
2008	Owen Garvan	Ipswich Town
2007	Stephen O'Halloran	Southampton (on loan from Aston Villa)
2006	Kevin Foley	Luton Town
2005	Kevin Doyle	Reading
2004	Glenn Whelan	Sheffield Wednesday
2003	No award ceremony.	
2002	Joe Murphy	West Bromwich Albion
2001	Steven Reid	Millwall
2000	Barry Quinn	Coventry City
1999	Alan Mahon	Tranmere Rovers
1998	Kevin Kilbane	West Bromwich Albion
1997	David Worrell	Blackburn Rovers

=== Under-19 International Player of the Year ===
Year	Winner	Club
2024	Freddie Turley	Derby County
2023	Mark O'Mahony	Brighton & Hove Albion
2022	Seán Grehan	Crystal Palace
2021	Bosun Lawal	Celtic
2020	Not Awarded	
2019	Jonathan Afolabi	Southampton/Celtic
2018	Lee O'Connor	Manchester United
2017	Declan Rice	West Ham United
2016	Georgie Poynton	Dundalk
2015	Ryan Manning	Queens Park Rangers
2014	Sam Byrne	Everton
2013	Pierce Sweeney	Reading
2012	Anthony Forde	Wolverhampton Wanderers
2011	John Egan	Sunderland
2010	Conor Clifford	Chelsea
2009	Lanre Oyebanjo	Histon
2008	Michael Spillane	Norwwich City
2007	Keith Treacy	Blackburn Rovers
2006	John Paul Kelly	Bohemians
2005	Joey O'Brien	Bolton Wanderers
2004	Willo Flood	Manchester City
2003	No award ceremony	
2002	Sean Thornton	Sunderland

=== Youths Player of the Year ===
Year	Winner (Note: Prior to the under-19 award there was the Youths Player of the Year Award which was awarded to players of a similar age group to that of the under-19 award.)	Club
2001	Jon Daly	Stockport County
2000	Joe Murphy	Tranmere Rovers
1999	Jason Gavin	Middlesbrough
1998	Barry Quinn	Coventry City
1997	Damien Duff	Blackburn Rovers

=== Under-18 International Player of the Year ===
Year	Winner	Club
2024	Kyle Fitzgerald	Galway United
2023	Danny McGrath	Lommel
2022	Sam Curtis	St Patrick's Athletic
2021	Alex Murphy	Galway United
2020	Not Awarded	
2019	Jason Knight	Derby County
2018	Brian Maher	St Patrick's Athletic

=== Under-17 International Player of the Year ===
Year	Winner	Club
2024	Finn Sherlock	Hoffenheim
2023	Harry McGlinchey	Chelsea
2022	Naj Razi	Shamrock Rovers
2021	Mark O'Mahony	Cork City
2020	Not Awarded	
2019	Joe Hodge	Manchester City
2018	Adam Idah	Norwich City
2017	Aaron Bolger	Shamrock Rovers
2016	Declan Rice	West Ham United
2015	Connor Ronan	Wolverhampton Wanderers
2014	Danny Kane	Huddersfield Town
2013	Jack Byrne	Manchester City
2012	Jack Grealish	Aston Villa
2011	Sean Kavanagh	Fulham
2010	Sean McGinty	Manchester United
2009	Stephen McDonnell	Dundalk
2008	Aaron Doran	Blackburn Rovers
2007	Conor McCormack	Manchester United
2006	Terry Dixon	Tottenham Hotspur
2005	Anthony Stokes	Arsenal
2004	Darren Randolph	Charlton Athletic
2003	No award ceremony.	
2002	Willo Flood	Manchester City

=== Under-16 International Player of the Year ===
Year	Winner	Club
2024	Niall Sullivan	St Patrick's Athletic
2023	Michael Noonan	St Patrick's Athletic
2022	Matthew Moore	Cork City
2021	Naj Razi	Shamrock Rovers
2020	Not Awarded	
2019	Ben McCormack	St Patrick's Athletic
2018	Troy Parrott	Tottenham Hotspur
2017	Jason Knight	Derby County
2016	Jordan Doherty	Sheffield United
2015	Jayson Molumby	Brighton & Hove Albion
2014	Conor Masterson	Liverpool
2013	Robert Duggan	Peterborough United
2012	Noe Baba	Fulham
2011	Kyle Callan-McFadden	Norwich City
2010	Mikey Drennan	Aston Villa
2009	John O'Sullivan	Blackburn Rovers
2008	Mark O'Brien	Derby County
2007	Conor Clifford	Chelsea
2006	James O'Brien	Birmingham City
2005	Donal McDermott	Manchester City
2004	Keith Treacy	Blackburn Rovers
2003	No award ceremony.	
2002	Steven Foley-Sheridan	Aston Villa
2001	Pierre Ennis	Aston Villa
2000	Stephen Brennan	Newcastle United
1999	Andy Reid	Nottingham Forest
1998	Shaun Byrne	West Ham United
1997	Richie Partridge	Liverpool/Stella Maris

=== Under-15 International Player of the Year ===
Year	Winner	Club
2024	Archie Quinn	Shamrock Rovers
2023	David Dunne	Cork City
2022	Rory Finneran	Blackburn Rovers
2021	Kaylem Harnett	Wexford
2020	Not Awarded	
2019	Glory Nzingo	St Patrick's Athletic
2018	Anselmo García MacNulty	Real Betis
2017	Troy Parrott	Tottenham Hotspur
2016	Callum Thompson	St Joseph's Boys
2015	Lee O'Connor	Villa FC, Waterford
2014	Anthony Scully	West Ham United
2002–2013	Not Awarded	
2001	Willo Flood	Manchester City
2000	Robbie Shields	Leeds United/Cherry Orchard
1999	Richard McCarthy	Manchester City/Stella Maris
1998	Cliff Byrne	Sunderland/Home Farm
1997	Thomas Butler	Sunderland/Stella Maris

== Women's Youth International ==
=== Under-19 Women's International Player of the Year ===
Year	Winner	Club
2024	Aoife Kelly	
2023	Kate Thompson	Galway United
2022	Scarlett Herron	Athlone Town
2021	Jessie Stapleton	Shelbourne
2018	Niamh Farrelly	Peamount United
2017	Lucy McCartan	Peamount United
2016	Roma McLaughlin	Peamount United
2015	Megan Connolly	Florida State Seminoles
2014	Megan Connolly	College Corinthians
2013	Claire Shine	Raheny United
2012	Emma Hansberry	Castlebar Celtic
2011	Grace Moloney	Reading
2010	Becky Walsh	Salthill Devon
2009	Julie-Ann Russell	Salthill Devon
2008	Karen Duggan	Piltown
2007	Lynn Bradley	Lynsey Wilton College
2006	Áine O'Gorman	Stella Maris
2005	Niamh Fahey	Salthill Devon
2004	Katie Taylor	St James's Gate
2003	No award ceremony.	
2002	Selina Moylan	Lifford FC
2001	Marie Curtin	Lifford FC
2000	Caroline Thorpe	Arsenal
1999	Dolores Deasley	Letterkenny Rovers

=== Under-17 Women's International Player of the Year ===
Year	Winner	Club
2024	Madison McGuane	
2023	Keeva Fylnn	Sligo Rovers
2022	Aoife Kelly	Shelbourne Ladies
2019	Éabha O'Mahony	Cork City
2018	Emily Whelan	Shelbourne Ladies
2017	Tiegan Ruddy	Shelbourne Ladies
2016	Saoirse Noonan	Cork City
2015	Amanda McQuillan	Shelbourne Ladies
2014	Evelyn Daly	Lakewood Athletic
2013	Savannah McCarthy	Listowel Celtic
2012	Lauren Dwyer	Wexford Youths
2011	Chloe Mustaki	Peamount United
2010	Not Awarded	
2009	Dora Gorman	Salthill Devon
2008	Ciara Grant	Kilmacrennan Celtic
2007	Gillian McDonnell	Dundalk City

=== Under-16 Women's International Player of the Year ===
Year	Winner	Club
2024	Keelin Comiskey	
2023	Ella Kelly	Shamrock Rovers
2022	Freya Healy	Peamount United
2018	Jessica Ziu	Shelbourne Ladies
2017	Aoife Slattery	Ferrybank
2016	Tyler Toland	Maiden City
2015	Heather Payne	Salthill Devon
2014	Jamie Finn	Raheny United

=== Under-15 Girls Schools International Player of the Year ===
Year	Winner	Club
2024	Hailey Twomey	Eureka Secondary School, Kells
2023	Madison McGuane	Ardscoil Mhuire, Corbally
2022	Abigail Bradshaw	St. Colmcille’s Community School, Knocklyon

== League Player of the Year ==
Year	Winner	Club
2023	Lee Grace	Shamrock Rovers
2022	Rory Gaffney	Shamrock Rovers
2021	Georgie Kelly	Bohemians
2020	Jack Byrne	Shamrock Rovers
2019	Jack Byrne	Shamrock Rovers
2018	Chris Shields	Dundalk
2017	Sean Maguire	Cork City
2016	Daryl Horgan	Dundalk
2015	Richie Towell	Dundalk
2014	Colin Healy	Cork City
2013	Killian Brennan	St Patrick's Athletic
2012	Jason McGuinness	Sligo Rovers
2011	Patrick Sullivan	Shamrock Rovers
2010	Gary Twigg	Shamrock Rovers
2009	Gary Twigg	Shamrock Rovers
2008	Brian Murphy	Bohemians
2007	Dave Mooney	Longford Town/Cork City
2006	Ollie Cahill	Shelbourne/Drogheda United
2005	George O'Callaghan	Cork City
2004	Owen Heary	Shelbourne
2003	Jason Byrne	Shelbourne
2002–03	Kevin Hunt	Bohemians
2001–02	Glen Crowe	Bohemians
2000–01	Glen Crowe	Bohemians
1999–00	Pat Fenlon	Shelbourne
1998–99	Paul Osam	St Patrick's Athletic
1997–98	Colin Hawkins	St Patrick's Athletic
1996–97	Peter Hutton	Derry City
1995–96	Tony Sheridan	Shelbourne
1994–95	Liam Coyle	Derry City
1993–94	Stephen Geoghegan	Shamrock Rovers
1992–93	Pat Morley	Cork City

== Hall of Fame ==
Year	Winner
2024	Dennis Irwin/Olivia O'Toole
2023	Niall Quinn/Nora McHugh
2022	Kevin Moran/Sue Hayden
2021	Shay Given/Linda Gorman
2020	Johnny Giles/Paula Gorham
2019	Paul McGrath/Anne O’Brien
2018	Richard Dunne/Emma Byrne
2017	Damien Duff
2016	Robbie Keane
2015	Tony Cascarino
2014	Andy Townsend
2013	Ronnie Whelan
2012	Kevin Sheedy
2011	Ray Houghton
2010	Frank Stapleton
2009	Ray Treacy
2008	Arthur Fitzsimons
2007	Paddy Mulligan
2006	Don Givens
2005	Mick Martin
2004	Gerry Daly
2003	No award ceremony.
2002	Liam Tuohy
2001	Liam Brady
2000	Joe Haverty
1999	1949 Irish team (v England)
1998	Shay Brennan/Tony Dunne
1997	Kevin O'Flanagan

== International Personality ==
Year	Winner
2018	(Georgia (country)) Kakha Kaladze
2017	(Italy) Marco Tardelli
2016	(Wales) John Hartson
2015	(Italy) Gianluca Vialli
2014	(Poland) Jan Tomaszewski
2013	(Serbia) Dejan Stanković
2012	(Poland) Zbigniew Boniek
2011	(Czech Republic) Pavel Nedvěd
2010	(Wales) Ian Rush
2009	(Argentina) Ricky Villa
2008	(Netherlands) Ruud Gullit
2007	(Brazil) Sócrates
2006	(England) Bobby Robson
2005	(Italy) Pierluigi Collina
2004	(Northern Ireland) Martin O'Neill
2003	No award ceremony.
2002	(France) Michel Platini
2001	(England) Jack Charlton
2000	(Northern Ireland) Pat Jennings
1999	(Scotland) Billy McNeill
1998	(England) Nobby Stiles
1997	(Germany) Franz Beckenbauer

== Special Merit Award ==
Year	Winner
2024	George Hamilton
2023	Michelle O'Neill
2022	Niamh O'Donoghue
2021	Dr.Alan Byrne
2020	Liam Farrell
2019	Charlie O'Leary
2018	Brendan Bradley
2017	Jimmy Magee
2016	Dundalk team
2015	Regions' Cup team
2014	Stephanie Roche
2013	Ciara Grant
2012	Not Awarded
2011	Shamrock Rovers team
2010	Republic of Ireland women's national under-17 football team
2009	Olivia O'Toole
2008	Eddie Foley
2007	Jack Charlton
2006	Pete Mahon
2005	Sean McCaffrey
2004	Vincent Butler
2003	No award ceremony.
2002	Des Casey
2001	Jim McLaughlin
2000	Dr Tony O'Neill/Tony Sheehan
1999	Billy Young
1998	Noel O'Reilly
1997	Eoin Hand

== Ameteur International Player of the Year ==
Year	Winner	Club
2024	Jake Dillon	Fairview Rangers
2023	Garbhan Friel	Cockhill Celtic
2022	Stephen Chambers	Killester Donnycarney

== Junior International Player of the Year ==
Year	Winner	Club
2019	Jordan Buckley	Usher Celtic
2018	Eoin Hayes	Newmarket Celtic
2017	Chris Higgins	St Michael's
2016	Stephen Kelly	Newmarket Celtic
2015	Jimmy Carr	St Michael's
2014	Darren Dunne	Sheriff YC
2013	Paul Breen	St Michael's
2012	Adrian Walsh	Carrick United
2011	James Walsh	St Michael's
2010	Ross Carrig	Killester United
2009	Wayne Fitzgerald	Carrick United
2008	Séamie Crowe	Athenry
2007	David Lacey	Killester United
2006	Michael Keogh	Killester United
2005	David Conroy	Ballymun United
2004	James Walsh	St Michael's
2003	No award ceremony.	
2002	Pat Holden	Evergreen
2001	Christy McElligott	Ballymun United
2000	Keith Bruen	Portmarnock
1999	Gary McCormack	Portmarnock
1998	Philip Long	St Kevin's Boys
1997	Barry Flynn	Fairview Rangers

== Intermediate Player of the Year ==
Year	Winner	Club
2019	Alan McGreal	Crumlin United
2018	Darragh Reynor	Maynooth University
2017	Aidan Roche	Liffey Wanderers
2016	Mark Horgan	Avondale United
2015	Ken Hoey	Rockmount
2014	Danny Long	Avondale United
2013	Malachy McDermott	Cockhill Celtic
2012	David O'Sullivan	Wayside Celtic
2011	Brendan O'Connell	Rockmount
2010	Séamie Crowe	Athenry
2009	Ken Hoey	Rockmount
2008	Derek Prendergast	Bangor Celtic
2007	Paul McCabe	Crumlin United
2006	Ken Hoey	Rockmount
2005	Ruari Beechinor	Rockmount
2004	Ian Callaghan	Wayside Celtic
2003	No award ceremony.	
2002	Graham Dunning	Bluebell United
2001	B. Porter	Letterkenny Rovers
2000	Brian Healy	Temple United
1999	Jonathan King	Ashtown Villa

== Football for All International Player of the Year ==
Year	Winner	Club
2024	Heather Jameson	Cerebral Palsy
2022	Rebekah Grant	Deaf Futsal
2021	Joe Markey	Ireland CP Team
2019	Thomas Donogher	Powerchair
2018	Nathalie O’Brien	Irish Women’s Deaf Futsal
2017	Gary Messitt	Cerebral Palsy Sport Ireland
2016	Paul McMahon	Football For All Under-19 Squad
2015	Mark Duffy	Special Olympics Ireland
2014	Aoife McNicoll	Irish Powerchair Football Squad
2013	Noel O'Donnell	Irish Deaf Men's Squad
2012	Davy Byrne	Irish Homeless World Cup Team
2011	Adrian Clarke	Irish Special Olympics International Squad
2010	Richard Dougherty	Irish Deaf Men's Squad
2009	Luke Evans	Ireland CP Soccer team
2008	Stephen Coleman	Ireland Street League
2007	Kieran Woods	Park FC
2006	Gary Messitt	Cerebral Palsy Sport Ireland
2005	Joe Watson	Irish Deaf Sports/Waterford Crystal FC
2004	Rita Doherty	Special Olympics Ireland
2003	No award ceremony.	
2002	Graham Dunning	Cerebral Palsy Sport Ireland

== FAI School's International Player of the Year ==
Year	Winner	Club
2024	Rhys Knight	Bray Wanderers/Clonkeen College, Blackrock
2023	Daire Patton	Sligo Rovers/Summerhill College, Sligo
2022	Peter Grogan	Bohemians/St. Mary's CBS, Carlow
2021	John O'Donovan	Cork City/Clonakilty Community College
2019	Niall O'Keefe	Waterford/De La Salle College Waterford
2018	Ali Reghba	Bohemians/Chanel College
2017	Neil Farrugia	UCD/St Andrew's College, Blackrock
2016	Conor McCarthy	Cork City/Scoil Mhuire Gan Smal
2015	Connor Ellis	Cork City/Coláiste Pobail Bheanntraí
2014	Ryan Manning	Queens Park Rangers/Galway United/Yeats College
2013	Alan Browne	Preston North End/Nagle Community College
2012	Sean Maguire	CBS Kilkenny
2011	Hugh Douglas	Belvedere F.C./Woodbrook College
2010	Robbie Benson	Marist College
2009	Shane Howard	Colaiste Eoin, Carlow
2008	John Mulroy	Moyle Park College
2007	Patrick Mullins	CBS Sexton Street
2006	Conor Powell	Bohemians/Portmarnock Community School
2005	Gary Deegan	Bohemians/Chanel College
2004	Darren Quigley	UCD/St Laurence's College
2003	Stephen Ward	Portmarnock Community School
2002	Vincent Tyrell	Bohemians/St Declan's
2001	Ashley White	St Macartan's College
2000	Alan Murphy	Galway United/Ballinrobe Community School
1999	Conor O'Grady	Sligo Rovers/Summerhill College
1998	Kevin Doherty	Liverpool/Home Farm/St. Joseph's C.B.S.
1997	Ronnie O'Brien	Middlesbrough/St. Brendans
1996	Darragh Sheridan	St Mary's College
1995	Colin Hawkins	St. Joseph's Patrician College
1994	Karl Lafferty	St. Columba's College
1993	Anthony Scully	Collinstown Park Community College
1992	Declan Boyle	St Catherine's Vocational School
1991	Shaun Elebert	Plunket College
1990	Barry Patton	St. Columba's College

== Colleges and Universities Player of the Year ==
Year	Winner	Club
2021	Colin McCabe	Technological University Dublin
2018	Daire O'Connor	University College Dublin
2017	Sean McLoughlin	University College Cork
2016	Paul Rooney	Maynooth University
