= Niamh Farrelly =

Irish footballer

Personal information
- Date of birth: 15 April 1999 (age 27)
- Place of birth: Dublin, Ireland
- Positions: Defender; midfielder

Team information
- Current team: Galway United
- Number: 71

Youth career
- Esker Celtic
- Peamount United

Senior career*
Years	Team	Apps	(Gls)
2015–2020	Peamount United		
2021–2022	Glasgow City		
2022–2023	Parma	17	(1)
2023–2024	London City Lionesses	11	(1)
2024	Peamount United	8	(1)
2025–	Galway United	24	(2)

International career^{‡}
2019–	Republic of Ireland	4	(0)
- * Club domestic league appearances and goals as of 10 May 2026 ‡ National team caps and goals as of 10 May 2026

Niamh Farrelly (born 15 April 1999) is an Irish professional footballer who plays for LOI Women's Premier Division side Galway United. She previously played for Glasgow City of the Scottish Women's Premier League, who she joined from Peamount United of the Women's National League (WNL). In 2019 she made her debut for the Republic of Ireland women's national team. She can play in either the centre of defence or in midfield.

== Club career ==
Farrelly is from Lucan, Dublin and she learned to play street football alongside her brother. An Arsenal FC supporter, she spent one season with Esker Celtic playing in the Dublin and District Schoolboys'/girls' League (DDSL) before moving to Peamount United. She also played Gaelic football for the youth system of Lucan Sarsfields GAA, before deciding to focus on soccer.

In September 2015 Farrelly made her debut for Peamount United's first team in a 4–2 WNL Shield win over Castlebar Celtic. She enjoyed good form in the 2018 Women's National League, being named WNL Player of the Month for September 2018 and named in the Team of the Season. She was part of the team as "The Peas" secured the 2019 Women's National League title.

After helping Peamount United secure a League and Cup "double" in their 2020 campaign, Farrelly signed a three-year professional contract with Scottish Women's Premier League club Glasgow City in December 2020. She had played in the teams' UEFA Women's Champions League fixture the previous month. The transfer was scheduled to complete with the opening of the transfer window on 2 January 2021, and Farrelly was assigned City's number 17 jersey.

On her professional debut Farrelly scored a goal and was named Player of the Match in a 3–0 win over Celtic in April 2021. She also scored in both of her next two matches with the club to help secure the 2020–21 Scottish Women's Premier League title. In February 2022 Farrelly was criticised for a dangerous foul on Celtic's Chloe Craig which left both players injured. Glasgow City announced that Farrelly was among seven players to leave the deposed Scottish champions in June 2022.

In July 2022 Farrelly announced that she had signed for newly formed Parma, of the Italian Serie A. Although Farrelly had been happy during her 18 months in Glasgow, she accepted the move to Italy because she wanted to test herself in a different culture.

On 16 August 2023 it was announced that Farrelly would join London City Lionesses on a one-year contract.

== International career ==
=== Youth ===
Farrelly represented Ireland at schoolgirl level while she attended St. Joseph's College, Lucan. She represented the Republic of Ireland women's national under-17 football team in the 2015 UEFA Women's Under-17 Championship qualification mini tournament in Serbia, but was disappointed to be dropped from the squad for the final tournament. Spurred on by that rejection, she missed her Debs to train with the Republic of Ireland women's national under-19 football team and was then appointed captain at the higher age group. At the FAI International Football Awards she was named 2018 Under-19 Women's International Player of the Year.

While enrolled at Dublin City University, Farrelly represented Ireland at the 2019 Summer Universiade.

=== Senior ===
In August 2016 Ireland coach Susan Ronan named Farrelly in a young and predominantly home-based senior squad for a training camp in Wales. She did not feature in either of the scheduled challenge matches against the Welsh hosts. Ronan's successor as national team coach Colin Bell called up Farrelly for the first time as a late replacement in the FIFA Women's World Cup qualifying fixture away to European Champions the Netherlands in November 2017. She was not included in the match day squad for Ireland's encouraging 0–0 draw, but took heart from the experience.

She won her first senior cap in a 1–0 friendly defeat by Belgium, staged in Murcia, Spain, on 20 January 2019. She was an 86th-minute substitute for Claire O'Riordan who had a head injury. In August 2019 she started a 3–0 friendly defeat by the United States at the Rose Bowl in Pasadena, California, and was complimented on her performance by interim manager Tom O'Connor: "Niamh Farrelly and Jess Gargan were excellent, they didn't look out of sync at all".

=== International appearances ===
Appearances and goals by national team and year
National team	Year	Apps
Republic of Ireland	2019	2
Republic of Ireland	2021	2
Total		4
