= Marie Curtin =

Irish soccer and Gaelic player

Personal information
- Full name: Marie Claire Curtin
- Date of birth: 7 August 1985 (age 41)
- Place of birth: Ireland
- Positions: Defender; midfielder; forward

Team information
- Current team: Treaty United
- Number: 4

College career
Years	Team	Apps	(Gls)
2004–2008	Hofstra Pride		

Senior career*
Years	Team	Apps	(Gls)
2000–2009	Lifford Ladies		
2003	→ UCD (guest)		
2005–2008	Long Island Fury		
2010–2011	Kilmallock United		
2011–2012	Cork Women's F.C.		
2012	Fortuna Ålesund		
2014–2017	Galway		
2017–2018	Aisling-Annacotty		
2018–2020	Limerick	29	
2020–2021	Treaty United W.F.C.	6	(0)

International career
2000–2012	Republic of Ireland	55	
- * Club domestic league appearances and goals

Marie Claire Curtin (born 7 August 1985) is a former professional footballer who played for Republic of Ireland women's national football team. Curtin played for several clubs in the Women's National League, including Cork Women's F.C., Galway, Limerick and most recently Treaty United. She has also represented UCD in Europe. Curtin has also played at a semi-professional level for Long Island Fury in the Women's Premier Soccer League and for Fortuna Ålesund in the Norwegian First Division. Curtin has also played senior Ladies' Gaelic football for Limerick. In 2013 Curtin and her father, Sean, co-founded a dairy foods company, Temple Dairy Ltd. Curtin retired from football in January 2021.

== Early years and education ==
Curtin was raised in County Limerick, near Kilmallock. The Curtin family have run a dairy farm between Banogue and Athlacca since the 1940s and Marie's parents, Sean and Eileen, took over the farm in 1975. She is one of seven children, with three brothers and three sisters. She began playing association football on the farm with her siblings and their friends from an early age. Curtin attended Ard Scoil Mhuire in Bruff. Between 2004 and 2008 Curtin attended Hofstra University on a four-year full soccer scholarship where she gained a BA in social sciences.

== Association football ==
=== Lifford Ladies ===
Throughout her career Curtin played regularly for Ennis-based Lifford Ladies. In 2001 Curtin was named FAI Under-19 Women's International Player of the Year while playing for Lifford. She also made her senior debut for the Republic of Ireland while a Lifford player. Marie's sister, Anne Curtin, also played for Lifford Ladies and was a university international. The Curtin sisters helped Lifford Ladies reach the 2003 FAI Women's Cup final which they lost 2–0 to UCD. Marie Curtin subsequently guested for UCD in their 2003–04 UEFA Women's Cup campaign.

=== Hofstra Pride ===
Between 2004 and 2008 Curtin attended Hofstra University on a soccer scholarship. Her teammates at Hofstra Pride included fellow Republic of Ireland women's internationals, Diane Caldwell and Edel Malone.

=== Semi-professional ===
Curtin has played at a semi-professional level. Between 2005 and 2008, while attending Hofstra University, Curtin also played for Long Island Fury in the Women's Premier Soccer League. On 20 May 2005, Curtin scored the first three goals in the team's history, scoring a first half hat-trick as Long Island defeated Northampton Laurels 5–0 as they made their WPSL debut. Curtin had a second spell as a semi-professional when she played for Fortuna Ålesund during the 2012 Norwegian First Division season.

=== Women's National League ===
Before the establishment of Women's National League, Curtin was playing junior football with Kilmallock United. In 2010 Curtin helped them reach the FAI Women's Junior Cup final which they lost 1–0 to Bohemians. The inaugural 2011–12 Women's National League season saw Curtin playing for Cork Women's F.C. The 2014–15 season saw Curtin sign for Galway W.F.C. By 2017 Curtin was playing for Aisling-Annacotty in the Limerick Women's & Schoolgirls' Soccer League. In 2018 she made a return to the WNL with Limerick. 2020 saw Curtin play for newly formed Treaty United of the WNL after Limerick were liquidated. She retired from professional football on 11 January 2021.

=== Republic of Ireland ===
Curtin has represented the Republic of Ireland at under–16, under–18 and under–19 levels. Between 2000 and 2012 Curtin won 45 caps while representing the senior team. She made her debut for the senior team, aged just 16, in a behind closed doors friendly against Arsenal Ladies. She won her first full senior cap against Greece. Curtin represented the Republic of Ireland in qualifying campaigns for the 2005, 2009 and 2013 UEFA Women's Euros and the 2007 and 2011 FIFA Women's World Cups. Curtin also represented Ireland at the 2007 Summer Universiade.

== Ladies' Gaelic football ==
Marie Curtin
Sport
- Sport: Ladies' Gaelic football
- Position: Forward
Club
- Years: Club
- Mungret St. Pauls
Inter-county
- Years: County
- 20xx–201x: Limerick

Curtin played senior ladies' Gaelic football for Limerick and Mungret St. Pauls. On 26 September 2010 Curtin scored 2-5 and was named player of the match as she helped Limerick defeat Louth in the 2010 All-Ireland Junior Ladies' Football Championship final.

== Business woman ==
In 2013 Curtin and her father, Sean, co-founded a dairy foods company, Temple Dairy Ltd. The company's main product is a healthy chocolate milk drink. Curtin is the company's managing director. In April 2017 Curtin promoted her product on an edition of Dragons' Den.

== Honours ==
=== Association football ===
Individual

- FAI Under-19 Women's International Player of the Year
  - Winner: 2001

Long Island Fury

- Women's Premier Soccer League
  - Winners: 2006

Kilmallock United

- FAI Women's Junior Cup
  - Runners Up: 2010

=== Gaelic football ===
Limerick

- All-Ireland Junior Ladies' Football Championship
  - Winner: 2010
