= Éabha O'Mahony =

Irish footballer

Personal information
- Date of birth: 17 May 2002 (age 24)
- Place of birth: Republic of Ireland
- Position: Defender

Team information
- Current team: Shelbourne
- Number: 2

Youth career
- 2012–2018: Lakewood Athletic

College career
Years	Team	Apps	(Gls)
2021–2022	Boston College Eagles	33	(0)
2023	Texas Longhorns	8	(0)
2025	Miami Hurricanes	16	(1)

Senior career*
Years	Team	Apps	(Gls)
2018–2021	Cork City	37	(9)
2022–2023	North Carolina Courage U23	8	(0)
2024	Shelbourne	9	(2)

International career^{‡}
2017–2019	Republic of Ireland U17	13	(2)
2019	Republic of Ireland U19	3	(0)
2019–	Republic of Ireland	4	(0)
- * Club domestic league appearances and goals as of 10 March 2025 ‡ National team caps and goals as of 10 March 2025

Éabha O'Mahony (born 17 May 2002) is an Irish footballer who plays as a defender for Shelbourne in the League of Ireland Women's Premier Division and the Republic of Ireland national team. She has previously played for Cork City in the Women's National League and for North Carolina Courage U23 in the USL W League. She has also played for college teams Boston College Eagles in the Atlantic Coast Conference and Texas Longhorns in the Southeastern Conference.

== Club career ==
=== Youth ===
O'Mahony played youth football for Lakewood Athletic from 2012 to 2018, during which she twice won the Golden Boot award and was Player of the Year.

=== Cork City ===
After playing youth football for Lakewood Athletic, O'Mahony joined Women's National League club Cork City in July 2018 and made her a few days later, saying "It was great to be finally able to play a match with Cork City and get time on the pitch." She had a fantastic start to her career, winning the league's Player of the Month award for August. At the end of the 2018 season, she was named in the Team of the Season.

=== United States ===
O'Mahony made a big move to the United States, joining Boston College Eagles in the summer of 2021, with coach Jason Lowe expecting her to be popular due to their big Irish fan base. It was important for her to make clear that she would be allowed to travel back to Europe for international duty. She took up the scholarship offer thanks to advice of Ireland team-mate Heather Payne.

During her time in the United States, O'Mahony said she loved the professionalism of the game, including playing with high calibre players, such as Jaelin Howell who plays for the United States national team.

From May to July 2022, O'Mahony played in the USL W League with North Carolina Courage U23. She played eight games for the club.

In December 2022, after two seasons playing for Boston College Eagles, in which she started 33 matches, the Texas Longhorns announced her arrival as a high-profile transfer, alongside Abby Allen and Mia Justus. This move offered her a more competitive program with greater funding. In the 2023 season, she played eight matches, contributing to six shutouts.

=== Shelbourne ===
After completing her studies in the United States, majoring in psychology, O'Mahony returned to Ireland, signing with Shelbourne in February 2024. Reflecting on her move, she praised the supportive and competitive environment at Shelbourne, noting that the team's ambition to regain the Women's Premier Division title and the loyalty of its fans have driven her to excel. She made her first appearance for the club in May 2024, in a 3–0 victory over DLR Waves and scored her first goal two weeks later against her former club Cork City.

== International career ==
O'Mahony was a key player for Ireland's national under-17 team and has captained the team.

In August 2020, O'Mahony was announced as the 2019 Under-17 Women's International Player of the Year.

O'Mahony made her debut for the Ireland's senior national team in August 2019, coming on as a substitute in a friendly match against the United States. She described it as "an indescribable experience getting my first cap on such a great occasion against the world champions."

Appearances and goals by national team and year
National team	Year	Apps	Goals
Republic of Ireland	2019	1	0
Republic of Ireland	2021	2	0
Republic of Ireland	2022	1	0
Total		4	0

== Style of play ==
O'Mahony is a complete midfielder, having a great passing ability and positional sense knowing where the goal is. She keeps on setting standards for herself as part of a constant bid to improve. For example, she said about the COVID-19 outbreak "I relished the lockdown in a sense because I used it as an opportunity to wind down, train myself and do a SWOT analysis of myself."

== Personal life ==
O'Mahony studied in Ireland at Ballincollig Community School and Mount Mercy College in Cork. Afterwards she studied in the United States at Boston College and the University of Texas.
