= Kilkenny United W.F.C. =

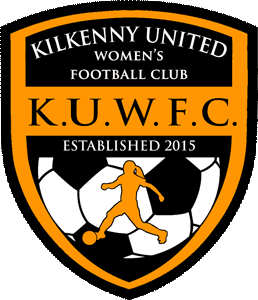
- Full name: Kilkenny United Women's Football Club
- Founded: 2015
- Ground: The Watershed, Kilkenny, County Kilkenny
- Chairman: Shane Murray
- 2019: 8th, Women's National League
- Website: kilkennyunitedfc.ie
| Home colours | Away colours |

Kilkenny United Women's Football Club is an Irish women's football team, based in Kilkenny. In July 2015 the Football Association of Ireland (FAI) announced the formation of the club as an expansion team for the upcoming 2015–16 Women's National League season. Kilkenny United WFC played in the Women's National League until 2019, but won only one match in five seasons.

== History ==
=== 2015–16 ===
In July 2015 the Football Association of Ireland (FAI) announced the formation of the club as an expansion team for the upcoming 2015–16 Women's National League season. The club played its first match on 19 July 2015, hosting Celtic at Buckley Park. Ahead of the first WNL season experienced campaigner Sylvia Gee was signed. In game week 8 of the 2015-16 season Kilkenny United recorded their first ever point, with a draw. They drew 1–1 with Cork City W.F.C. The club ended the campaign with one point on the board.

=== 2016 ===
Kilkenny recorded their first win in the 2016 season when they were drawn against Lakewood in the quarter-finals of the FAI Women's Senior Cup. Kilkenny came out 3–1 winners with goals from Jenny O'Keeffe, Niamh Kelly and Hannah Scott. Kilkenny United commenced to the semi-finals of the cup but lost out to a strong Wexford Youths W.F.C. in the semi-finals. The 2016 League campaign didn't go as planned for Kilkenny, with the club failing to pick up any points throughout the season.

=== 2017 ===
The 2017 season didn't start as planned as Kilkenny went through numerous managers before finally getting the right man for the job on 20 June 2017. Kilkenny United appointed Casey McQuillan who had much experience in the league from previously managing Shelbourne L.F.C. and Raheny United FC. On 9 July 2017, history was made for Kilkenny in Thomastown when Kilkenny won their first and only game in the Women's National League. They beat Galway W.F.C 1–0 which was a very historic day for the club. The Kilkenny goal came from Leanne Tumelty. Kilkenny United ended the season with 3 points and a single win on the board. Kilkenny also recorded a win in the quarter-finals of the FAI Women's Senior Cup when they beat TEK United 3–1. Kilkenny's goals were scored by Jennifer Chambers (2) and Sylvia Gee. Kilkenny were drawn against UCD Waves in the semi-finals of the cup but slipped at the last hurdle and lost out on a trip to the Aviva Stadium.

=== 2018 ===
At the start of the 2018 season Casey McQuillan stepped down as manager of the club. Kilkenny started off the 2018 season at debutantes Limerick WFC and were beaten 4–0.

The club introduced an Under 16 squad which they entered into the Kilkenny & District League. On 12 July 2018 Kilkenny United announced a link-up with Real Football academy Swans. They announced their intention to set up a pathway to the Women's National League for the Real FA Swans players.

=== 2019 ===
In 2019, Kilkenny garnered two points. The club's off-field operation also began to unravel, with reasons such as matches being played in another venue, and the lack of a youth system.

== Dismissal from the Women's National League ==
The Football Association of Ireland (FAI) unexpectedly threw Kilkenny United out of the Women's National League ahead of the 2020 season. The reasons given included the club's failure to bond with their local women's leagues, changing their home ground, not training in Kilkenny, having an unqualified coach, failing to fulfil a fixture and having consistently poor results and feeble performances. After a failed appeal, the club disagreed with the FAI's decision and released a lengthy statement in January 2020. The club decided to continue playing at Wexford League level and re-emerged in August 2020.
