= Emma Mullin =

Irish association footballer and Gaelic footballer

Personal information
- Born: 4 March 1985 (age 41) Kilmaine, Republic of Ireland

Sport
- Sport: Ladies' Gaelic football
Inter-county
- Years: County
- Mayo
Inter-county titles
- Connacht titles: 2009
- All-Irelands: 4 times (including 2002)

Emma Mullin (born 4 March 1985) is an Irish ladies' Gaelic footballer and association footballer. In Gaelic football, she won the All-Ireland Senior Ladies' Football Championship four times with Mayo GAA. In association football, she has played for the Republic of Ireland women's national football team.

== Gaelic football career ==
Mullin was part of the Mayo GAA side that lost the 2001 All-Ireland Senior Ladies' Football Championship Final, and won the league in 2002. In 2003, she was one of 11 Mayo players nominated for an All Star player award. In 2009, she scored in the GAA National League semi-final, and played in the All-Ireland semi-final. She scored in the 2009 Connacht final, as Mayo beat Galway. In total, she won four All Ireland Championships with Mayo. She also has a Gaelic football coaching qualification.

== Association football career ==
Emma Mullin
Personal information
- Position: Forward

Senior career*
Years	Team	Apps	(Gls)
2006	Mayo	?	(?)
2008–2014	Castlebar Celtic	?	(?)

International career^{‡}
?	Republic of Ireland B	1	(?)
2012–?	Republic of Ireland	1+	(?)
- * Club domestic league appearances and goals as of 17:29, 4 April 2021 (UTC) ‡ National team caps and goals as of 17:29, 4 April 2021 (UTC)

In 2006, Mullin represented a Mayo Women's Football League team which won the 2006 FAI Women's Cup. She competed in the football event at the 2007 Summer Universiade, and so was unavailable to play for the Mayo Ladies team in the 2007–08 UEFA Women's Cup. In 2008, Mullin joined Women's National League team Castlebar Celtic. She scored 10 goals in the 2011–12 Women's National League. She scored in the 2013 FAI Women's Cup Final; Castlebar Celtic lost the match 3–2 to Raheny United. A persistent ankle injury forced Mullin's retirement from playing after the 2013–14 season.

Mullin has played for the Ireland Colleges international team, and made one appearance for the Republic of Ireland B team. In 2012, Mullin made her first appearance for the Republic of Ireland women's national football team in an Algarve Cup match against Hungary. She was the first Castlebar Celtic player to represent the Republic of Ireland team. She also played for Ireland in UEFA Women's Euro 2013 qualifying matches.

Mullin has worked as an association football coach in Ballina, County Mayo. In 2010, she became the Football Facilitator at the Institute of Technology, Sligo (IT Sligo). Whilst in the role, IT Sligo won an Irish futsal tournament.

== Personal life ==
Mullin is from Frenchbrook, Kilmaine, Ireland. She has a degree in business from IT Sligo, and a master's degree in Exercise and Sports Management at University College Dublin.
