= Limerick W.F.C. =

- Full name: Limerick Women's Football Club
- Nicknames: Super Blues; Shannonsiders
- Founded: 1973
- Dissolved: 2020
- Ground: Markets Field
- Capacity: 5,000 (1,710 seated)
- Chairman: Pat O'Sullivan
- Manager: Dave Rooney
- League: Women's National League; Women's Under 17 National League
- 2019: 7th
- Website: http://www.limerickfc.ie
Home colours	Away colours

Limerick Women's Football Club was an Irish association football club based in Limerick. It is the women's section of Limerick F.C. Their senior women's team made their debut in the Women's National League in 2018. However the club has been organising women's teams, often in conjunction with the Limerick Women's & Schoolgirls' Soccer League, since at least 1973. Limerick have been credited as the inaugural winners of both the Ladies League of Ireland and the FAI Women's Cup. Ladies team was dissolved after financial collapse of Limerick F.C. main division.

== History ==
=== 1970s ===
Limerick F.C. organised a women's team during the 1970s. In 1973 Limerick were both founding members and the inaugural champions of an earlier incarnation of the Women's National League known as the Ladies League of Ireland or the Woman's League of Ireland. Limerick were among its twelve founder members. Like Limerick, other founder members included several teams associated with clubs in the men's League of Ireland. These included Finn Harps, Cork Celtic, Dundalk and Sligo Rovers. Limerick finished the 1973 season as champions after going unbeaten in a fifteen match series. In a post season friendly they lost 3–1 to a touring Stade de Rheims at Markets Field. Limerick have also been credited as the inaugural winners of the FAI Women's Cup. Although the RSSSF archives only list finals from 1989, a match programme from a 1978 international between the Republic of Ireland and France confirmed that the FAI Women's Cup was first played for in 1975 with Limerick defeating C.S.O. (Dublin) 2–1 in the final.

=== LWSSL ===
The Limerick Women's & Schoolgirls' Soccer League was formed in 1973. The LWSSL representative team with the support of Limerick F.C. enters teams in various inter-league competitions. Between 2006 and 2011 a Limerick F.C./LWSSL team regularly entered the FAI Women's Cup.

=== Women's National League ===
In January 2018 it was announced that Limerick F.C. would be entering a team in the Women's National League for the 2018 season. On 11 March 2018, with a team that included Marie Curtin and Sylvia Gee, Limerick made their debut in the WNL with a 4–0 win at Markets Field against Kilkenny United.

== Players ==
=== 2019 squad ===
Note: Flags indicate national team as defined under FIFA eligibility rules; some limited exceptions apply. Players may hold more than one non-FIFA nationality.

No.	Pos.	Nation	Player
1	GK	IRL	Trish Fennelly
2	DF	IRL	Tara Mannix
3	DF	IRL	Megan Carroll
4	DF	IRL	Rebecca Mahon
5	DF	IRL	Marie Curtin
6	MF	IRL	Therese Hartley
7	DF	IRL	Sabrina McCarthy
8	MF	IRL	Carys Johnston
9	FW	IRL	Sophie Hudner
10	MF	IRL	Megan Kelleher

No.	Pos.	Nation	Player
11	MF	IRL	Shauna Rooney
12	MF	IRL	Rebecca Horgan
13	MF	IRL	Samantha McCarthy
14	MF	IRL	Claire Kelly
15	MF	IRL	Lauren Keane
17	DF	IRL	Alanna Morris
18	MF	IRL	Aisling O'Connor
19	FW	IRL	Sylvia Gee
21	GK	IRL	Karen Connolly
—		IRL	Sophie Gleeson

=== Notable players ===
==== Republic of Ireland women's internationals ====
- (Republic of Ireland) Marie Curtin
- (Republic of Ireland) Sylvia Gee

== Honours ==
- Ladies League of Ireland
  - Winners: 1973, 1974, 1975: 3
- FAI Women's Cup
  - Winners: 1975: 1
