= 2015–16 Women's National League (Ireland) =

Women's National League
- Season: 2015–16
- Champions: Wexford Youths
- UEFA Women's Champions League: Wexford Youths
- Matches: 51
- Goals: 249 (4.88 per match)
- Top goalscorer: Áine O'Gorman (UCD Waves):17
- Biggest home win: Wexford Youths 17–1 Castlebar Celtic (2 January 2016)
- Biggest away win: Castlebar Celtic 1–9 Shelbourne Ladies (10 October 2015)
- Highest scoring: Wexford Youths 17–1 Castlebar Celtic (2 January 2016)

The 2015–16 Women's National League was the fifth season of the Women's National League. Two new clubs joined the league before the start of the season, restoring the number of teams in the league to eight. Kilkenny United were formed as expansion team while Raheny United's senior women's team merged with Shelbourne Ladies. This effectively saw Shelbourne Ladies takeover Raheny United's place in the WNL. The season also saw the introduction of the WNL Shield. Wexford Youths and Shelbourne Ladies finished the season as the league's two strongest teams. In the league itself, the two teams finished level on points before Wexford Youths retained the title after a play-off. Wexford Youths also completed a treble, having already won both the FAI Women's Cup and WNL Shield. Shelbourne Ladies were also runners up in the WNL Shield before going on to win the WNL Cup. Before the season was finished Castlebar Celtic withdrew because they were unable to field a team.

== WNL Shield ==

The season began with the inaugural WNL Shield which saw the eight teams divided into two regional groups, one featuring northern teams and another featuring mostly southern teams. UCD Waves played in Group A along with the southern teams, Cork City, Kilkenny United and Wexford Youths. The other four northern teams, Castlebar Celtic, Galway W.F.C., Peamount United and Shelbourne Ladies played in Group B. The group stages began on 5 September and were completed by 4 October, before the regular season began. The format saw the four teams play each other once with the two group winners meeting in the final. In a sign of things to come, Castlebar Celtic failed to field a team against Shelbourne Ladies in their group game. Wexford Youths booked their place in the final with a 5–0 victory over Cork City. In the final, played at Ferrycarrig Park on 30 March 2016, Wexford Youths defeated Shelbourne Ladies 1–0 with Edel Kennedy scoring the winner.

=== Group A ===
Pos	Team	Pld	W	D	L	GF	GA	GD	Pts	Qualification
1	Wexford Youths	3	3	0	0	12	1	+11	9	Final
2	UCD Waves	3	2	0	1	11	4	+7	6	
3	Cork City	3	1	0	2	4	9	−5	3	
4	Kilkenny United	3	0	0	3	1	14	−13	0	

5 September 2015	Wexford Youths	3–1	UCD Waves	Ferrycarrig Park
15:00		Report

6 September 2015	Cork City	4–0	Kilkenny United	Bishopstown Stadium
14:00		Report

13 September 2015	UCD Waves	4–0	Cork City	UCD Bowl
14:00		Report

13 September 2015	Kilkenny United	0–4	Wexford Youths	Buckley Park
		Report

4 October 2015	Kilkenny United	1–6	UCD Waves	Buckley Park
14:00		Report

4 October 2015	Wexford Youths	5–0	Cork City	Ferrycarrig Park
14:00		Report

=== Group B ===
Pos	Team	Pld	W	D	L	GF	GA	GD	Pts	Qualification
1	Shelbourne Ladies	3	2	1	0	9	2	+7	7	Final
2	Galway W.F.C.	3	1	2	0	12	7	+5	5	
3	Peamount United	3	1	1	1	9	11	−2	4	
4	Castlebar Celtic	3	0	0	3	4	14	−10	0	

5 September 2015	Galway W.F.C.	1–1	Shelbourne Ladies	Eamonn Deacy Park
14:00		Report

5 September 2015	Peamount United	4–2	Castlebar Celtic	Greenogue
19:00		Report

12 September 2015	Castlebar Celtic	2–7	Galway W.F.C.	Celtic Park
19:30		Report

23 September 2015	Shelbourne Ladies	5–1	Peamount United	Morton Stadium
19:30		Report

3 October 2015	Shelbourne Ladies	3–0	Castlebar Celtic (Note: Castlebar Celtic unable to field a team. Shelbourne Ladies were awarded a 3–0 win.)
19:00		Report

3 October 2015	Galway W.F.C.	4–4	Peamount United	Eamonn Deacy Park
19:00		Report

=== Final ===
30 March 2016	Wexford Youths	1–0	Shelbourne Ladies	Ferrycarrig Park
	Kennedy 35'	Report		Referee: Michelle O'Neill

== Regular season ==
The regular season began in late October 2015 and was completed by May 2016. It used the traditional round-robin format with each team playing two full rounds of games home and away. Before the season was finished Castlebar Celtic withdrew because they were unable to field a team. Celtic had played nine games, losing eight and winning just one. All their results were subsequently expunged. During the course of the regular season Celtic had suffered two heavy defeats. On 10 October 2015 they lost 9–1 at home to Shelbourne Ladies. Then on 2 January 2016 they lost 17–1 to Wexford Youths. As a result of storms and floods, the season saw several games called off. This resulted in a backlog of games during the final run in. Some of these games were played midweek. In the final week Wexford Youths travelled to Galway W.F.C. on Sunday, 8 May knowing a victory would secure them the league title. However Youths dropped their first league points away from home and could only manage a 1–1 draw. Youths had a second chance to clinch the title when they played Shelbourne Ladies at Tolka Park on Wednesday, 11 May. However Shelbourne Ladies won 3–1 and as result finished level on points with Youths. This meant the title would be decided by a play-off for the first time. Before the play-off Shelbourne Ladies defeated UCD Waves in the WNL Cup final on Sunday, 15 May. The play-off took place on Sunday, 22 May at Tallaght Stadium. It proved third time lucky for Wexford Youths as they finally secured the title with a 2–1 win.

=== Final table ===
Pos	Team	Pld	W	D	L	GF	GA	GD	Pts	Qualification
1	Wexford Youths (C)	12	9	2	1	46	12	+34	29	2016–17 UEFA Women's Champions League
2	Shelbourne Ladies	12	9	2	1	42	11	+31	29	
3	UCD Waves	12	8	1	3	38	14	+24	25	
4	Galway W.F.C.	12	7	1	4	26	15	+11	22	
5	Peamount United	12	3	0	9	18	39	−21	9	
6	Cork City	12	2	1	9	12	40	−28	7	
7	Kilkenny United	12	0	1	11	9	60	−51	1	
8	Castlebar Celtic	9	1	0	8	7	51	−44	3	Withdrew after nine games (Note: Castlebar Celtic games are not included the final stats of the other eight teams.)

(C) Champions

=== Results ===
Home \ Away	CEL	COR	GAL	KIL	PEA	SHE	WAV	WEX
Castlebar Celtic		1–2		3–0	0–6	1–9		1–5
Cork City	4–0		1–6	1–1	0–1	1–3	1–5	0–4
Galway W.F.C.	5–0	4–0		3–0	3–1	0–2	0–3	1–1
Kilkenny United		1–2	1–4		2–5	0–7	0–5	0–3
Peamount United		3–4	1–2	3–1		0–3	0–3	0–8
Shelbourne Ladies	3–0	5–1	0–3	9–0	4–1		1–1	3–1
UCD Waves		4–1	3–0	6–0	5–3	0–2		1–2
Wexford Youths	17–1	3–0	2–0	12–2	8–0	3–3	4–2	

Legend: Blue = home team win; Yellow = draw; Red = away team win.

=== Play-off ===
22 May 2016	Wexford Youths	2–1	Shelbourne Ladies	Tallaght Stadium
	O'Riordan 43' 69'		Slattery 14'	Attendance: 710; Referee: Alan Carey

== WNL Cup ==
The WNL Cup was played between January and May 2016 during the second half of the season. The cup used a similar format to the WNL Shield, using the same regional groups. The WNL Cup fixtures were effectively the return matches of the earlier WNL Shield fixtures. The top two teams from each group progressed to the semi-finals. In the final Shelbourne Ladies defeated UCD Waves 3–2 at Richmond Park on 1 May 2016.

=== Group A ===
Pos	Team	Pld	W	D	L	GF	GA	GD	Pts	Qualification
1	Wexford Youths	3	2	1	0	13	2	+11	7	Semi-Finals
2	UCD Waves	3	2	1	0	10	2	+8	7	Semi-Finals
3	Cork City	3	1	0	2	1	11	−10	3	
4	Kilkenny United	3	0	0	3	2	10	−8	0	

24 January 2016	Kilkenny United	0–1	Cork City	Buckley Park

21 February 2016	UCD Waves	1–1	Wexford Youths	Jackson Park

16 January 2016	Wexford Youths	6–1	Kilkenny United	Ferrycarrig Park

30 January 2016	Cork City	0–6	Wexford Youths	Mayfield Community School, Mayfield, Cork

31 January 2016	UCD Waves	4–1	Kilkenny United	Jackson Park

30 March 2016	Cork City	0–5	UCD Waves	Cork IT

=== Group B ===
Pos	Team	Pld	W	D	L	GF	GA	GD	Pts	Qualification
1	Shelbourne Ladies	3	2	1	0	17	3	+14	7	Semi-Finals
2	Galway W.F.C.	3	2	0	1	6	5	+1	6	Semi-Finals
3	Peamount United	3	1	1	1	6	6	0	4	
4	Castlebar Celtic	3	0	0	3	2	17	−15	0	

9 January 2016	Shelbourne Ladies	3–0	Galway W.F.C.	Morton Stadium

9 January 2016	Castlebar Celtic	0–3	Peamount United	Celtic Park

16 January 2016	Peamount United	2–2	Shelbourne Ladies	Greenogue

16 January 2016	Galway W.F.C.	2–1	Castlebar Celtic	Eamonn Deacy Park

20 February 2016	Castlebar Celtic	1–12	Shelbourne Ladies	Celtic Park

31 January 2016	Peamount United	1–4	Galway W.F.C.	Greenogue

=== Semi-finals ===
27 April 2016	Shelbourne Ladies	4–2	Wexford Youths	Tolka Park
	Kiernan 3'; Murray 17' 37' 56'		Webb 59'; Hansberry

27 April 2016	UCD Waves	2–1	Galway W.F.C.	Jackson Park
	Russell 30'; O'Gorman 50'		Meaney

=== Final ===
1 May 2016	Shelbourne Ladies	3–2	UCD Waves	Richmond Park
	Murray 11' (?); Kiernan (?)		O'Gorman (?) (?)

== WNL Awards ==
Senior Player of the Year

- Karen Duggan (UCD Waves)

Young Player of the Year

- Roma McLaughlin (Peamount United)

Irish Daily Mail Golden Boot

- Áine O'Gorman (UCD Waves)

Team of the Season

No.	Pos.	Player	Date of birth (age)	Caps	Club
1	GK	Amanda McQuillan			Shelbourne Ladies
2	DF	Keeva Keenan			Shelbourne Ladies
3	DF	Méabh De Búrca			Galway W.F.C.
4	DF	Ruth Fahy			Wexford Youths
5	DF	Shauna Fox			Galway W.F.C.
6	MF	Karen Duggan			UCD Waves
7	MF	Emma Hansberry			Wexford Youths
8	MF	Roma McLaughlin			Peamount United
9	FW	Siobhán Killeen			Shelbourne Ladies
10	FW	Claire O'Riordan			Wexford Youths
11	FW	Áine O'Gorman			UCD Waves
