= Danny Kane =

Irish footballer and football coach

- Kane captaining the Republic of Ireland U19 in October 2015.

Personal information
- Date of birth: 23 April 1997 (age 29)
- Place of birth: Dublin, Ireland
- Position: Defender

Team information
- Current team: Cashmere Technical (player); Waimakariri United (director of Football)

Youth career
- –2011: Lakelands FC
- 2011–2013: Cherry Orchard
- 2013–2018: Huddersfield Town

Senior career*
Years	Team	Apps	(Gls)
2017–2018	Huddersfield Town	0	(0)
2018	Cork City	7	(0)
2018–2019	→ AFC Fylde (loan)	6	(0)
2019–2021	Sligo Rovers	15	(0)
2023–	Cashmere Technical	40	(0)

International career
2011–2012	Republic of Ireland U15		
2012–2013	Republic of Ireland U16		
2013–2014	Republic of Ireland U17		
2014–2015	Republic of Ireland U18		
2015–2016	Republic of Ireland U19		
2016–2018	Republic of Ireland U21		
- * Club domestic league appearances and goals

Danny Kane

Director of Football at Waimak United FC
- Incumbent
- Assumed office February 2025

Personal details
- Occupation: Footballer; Football Coach; Director of Football

Danny Kane (born 23 April 1997) is an Irish professional football player and coach. Kane currently plays as a defender for New Zealand National League club Cashmere Technical. He previously played for Huddersfield Town at youth level, before going on to play for Cork City, AFC Fylde (loan) and Sligo Rovers. Kane represented the Republic of Ireland national side at each underage level up to Under-21 level.

Kane is also an OFC/NZF B Licensed Football Coach, and currently holds the role of Director of Football at Waimakariri United AFC in Canterbury, New Zealand.

== Club career ==
=== Huddersfield Town ===
On 16 February 2013, Kane signed as an academy scholar for Huddersfield Town, the club then playing in the EFL Championship. Kane joined the Huddersfield Town Academy Under-18 squad for the start of the 2013-14 Season. In his first season at the club, Kane was a member of the Huddersfield Under-18 side that won the U18 Professional Development League 2 North Division and national titles. He was also part of the same side which reached the Quarter Final stage of the 2013–14 FA Youth Cup defeating the Manchester United Under-18 side en route.

During his second season as an academy scholar, Kane was an integral part of the Huddersfield Town Under-18 side that won the U18 Professional Development League 2 North Division title for the second season in succession.

Kane was a key member of the Huddersfield Town U21 side during the 2015–16 season as they won the U21 Professional Development League 2, topping the North Division and defeating Sheffield United in the national final. Kane was part of the same side which reached the semifinal stage of the 2015–16 Under-21 Premier League Cup.

2017–18 Season

Kane made his first team debut for Huddersfield Town in a 3-1 pre-season friendly win over Bury F.C. during July 2017. Kane played for the Huddersfield Town U21 side (Development Squad) up until January 2018, at which point he departed the club.

=== Cork City ===
On 24 January 2018, Kane departed Huddersfield Town following five years at the English club, to join League of Ireland Premier Division champions Cork City. Kane made his league debut for Cork City in a 1–0 home win over Dundalk at Turners Cross on 27 April 2018. Kane made his UEFA Champions League debut in the second leg of Cork City's First Qualifying Round defeat to Polish champions Legia Warsaw on 17 July 2018. Kane terminated his contract with Cork City in January 2019, having reached a mutual agreement with the club.

=== AFC Fylde (loan) ===
On 3 August 2018, Kane completed a loan transfer to AFC Fylde in the fifth tier of English football, the National League. Kane signed for the club on loan from Cork City until 14 January 2019, making six appearances during his time at the club.

=== Sligo Rovers ===
On 12 July 2019, it was announced that Kane had signed for League of Ireland Premier Division side Sligo Rovers on a contract running until October 2019. Kane made his competitive debut for the club the following day in a scoreless draw in the league at home to Waterford.

On 17 October 2019, Kane signed a new contract with Sligo Rovers for the 2020 League of Ireland Premier Division season. On 18 March 2021, Kane signed a new contract with Sligo Rovers for the 2021 League of Ireland Premier Division season. Kane terminated his contract with Sligo Rovers in 2022, having reached a mutual agreement with the club.

=== Cashmere Technical ===
In May 2023, Kane joined Cashmere Technical FC based in Christchurch, New Zealand.

Kane was part of the Cashmere Technical side that won the 2024 New Zealand Southern League, scoring in their 3–0 win away to Ferrymead Bays in August 2024 to win the title.

As Southern League champions, Kane represented Cashmere Technical in the 2024 New Zealand National League, the top league in the New Zealand football league system.

== International career ==
Kane represented the Republic of Ireland national side at U15, U16, U17, U18, U19 and Under-21 (U21) level.

Kane made his underage debut for the Republic of Ireland in an U15 international friendly draw against Belgium on 6 March 2012. Kane represented Republic of Ireland at the 2014 UEFA European Under-17 Championship elite round, 2016 UEFA European Under-19 Championship qualifiers and 2019 UEFA European Under-21 Championship qualifiers.

Kane made his Republic of Ireland U21 debut in a 2019 UEFA European Under-21 Championship qualifier win over Kosovo in March 2017. Kane's final match in green came in an away defeat to Germany U21 at the Voith-Arena on 16 October 2018, bringing to an end a six-year period of representing the Republic of Ireland at underage level.

Kane was named Football Association of Ireland Under-17 International Player of the Year 2014 at the FAI International Football Awards in March 2015, awarded for his performances at international level.

== Coaching ==
Kane is a licensed football coach, holding the UEFA C and OFC/NZF B Football Coaching Licences. Kane has coached Cashmere Technical youth sides at U14 and U17 levels.

In February 2025, Kane was appointed Director of Football at Waimak United FC in Rangiora, Canterbury, New Zealand. Kane is responsible for coaching standards for all teams at the club from underage to senior, with the Men's Senior team playing in the Canterbury Premiership League and the Women's Senior team playing in the Women's South Island League (New Zealand).

In addition to his club roles, Kane operates his own football coaching business, DK Football Coaching, where he provides one-on-one and small group football training to players in Christchurch, New Zealand.

== Honours ==
Individual

- FAI Under-17 International Player of the Year: 2014
- Mainland Football Mens Defender of the Year: 2026

Huddersfield Town Academy

- U18 Professional Development League 2 North Division: 2013-14
- U18 Professional Development League 2: 2013-14
- U18 Professional Development League 2 North Division: 2014-15
- U21 Professional Development League 2 North Division: 2015-16
- U21 Professional Development League 2: 2015-16

Cashmere Technical

- Southern League (New Zealand): 2024
