= Nicole Studer =

Swiss association football player (born 1996)

Personal information
- Date of birth: 22 February 1996 (age 30)
- Height: 1.76 m (5 ft 9 in)
- Position: Goalkeeper

Team information
- Current team: Grasshopper

International career
Years	Team	Apps	(Gls)
- Switzerland

Nicole Studer (born 22 February 1996) is a Swiss footballer who plays as a goalkeeper for Grasshopper and the Switzerland national team.
