= Nenè Bissoli =

Italian footballer

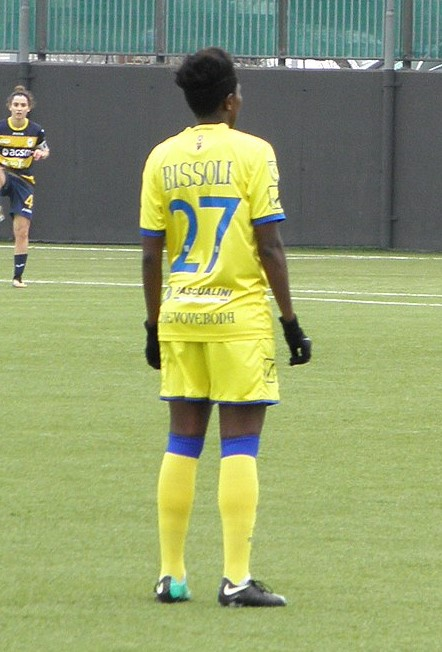

Personal information
- Full name: Nenè Nhaga Bissoli
- Date of birth: 10 October 1987 (age 39)
- Place of birth: Bula, Guinea-Bissau
- Height: 1.63 m (5 ft 4 in)
- Position: Defender

Senior career*
Years	Team	Apps	(Gls)
2004–2007	Porto Mantovano	62	(4)
2007–2015	Tavagnacco	169	(9)
2015–2018	Valpolicella	54	(1)

International career^{‡}
2009–2014	Italy	7	(0)
- * Club domestic league appearances and goals as of 13 May 2018 ‡ National team caps and goals as of 29 October 2014

Nenè Nhaga Bissoli (born 10 October 1987) is a retired footballer who played as a defender. She became a naturalized citizen of Italy in 2008. Born in Guinea-Bissau, she played for the Italy women's national team.

== Career ==
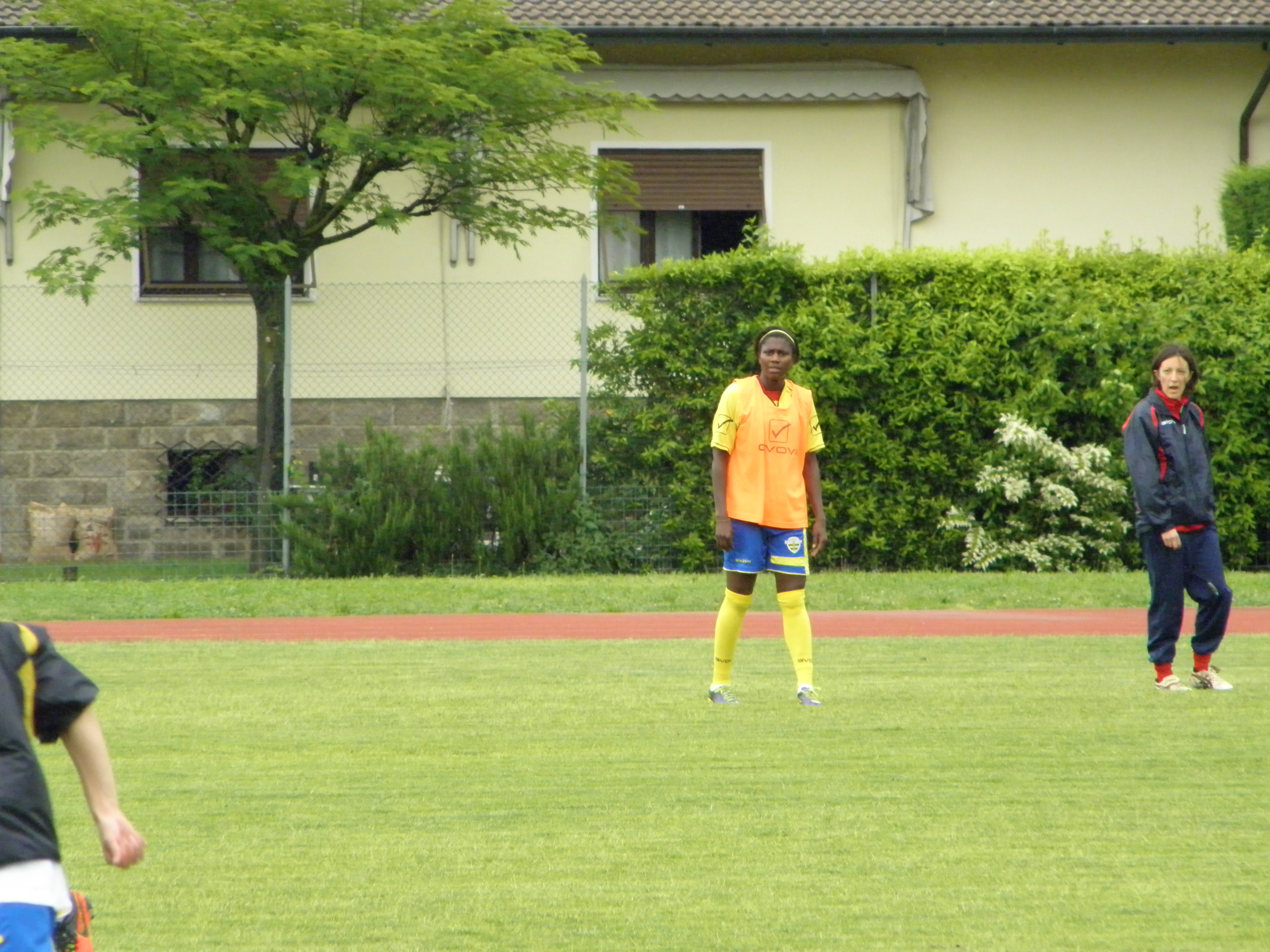
Bissoli prepartita finale Coppa Italia femminile 2015 02

=== Youth player ===
Bissoli's football career began at the Libertas Castagnaro team, helping them to win the Veneto Regional Youth Tournament in 1999, playing in defence.

=== National level ===
In February 2008, Bissoli was selected for the Italian Women's Soccer team to play in the forthcoming 2009 quarterfinals for the UEFA Women's Championship, playing against Hungary, Ireland and Romania. In 2009 she joined the national team to play against Armenia on 25 November.

After a period of non-selection, a new manager Antonio Cabrini met with Bissoli, who was selected to play in 2014 for the Cyprus Cup. Bissoli played in the 2015 qualification matches for the Women's Soccer World Cup.

Bissoli played for Tavagnacco from 2011 to 2014 and has played for Chievo Verona since 2017.
