= Chungnam Foreign Language High School =

Public school in Asan, South Korea

Coordinates: 36.80400°N 127.06146°E

Chungnam Foreign Language High School (also known as CFLHS; Korean: 충남외국어고등학교 or 충남외고) is a public foreign language high school located in the village of Tangjeong-myeon in the city of Asan, South Korea. It is a coed boarding school with a separate dormitory facility on the school campus which houses approximately 400 students. The school is administered by the Chungcheongnam-do Office of Education. The school motto is "Spread Your Wings to the World."

== History ==
The plan to found and create Chungnam Foreign Language High School was approved on December 28, 2002. Construction soon began in a rural part of Asan on land gifted to the Chungnam Office of Education by the Samsung Corporation. The first round of admission applications were received in 2007, and classes commenced with the start of the following school year on March 1, 2008.

== Enrollment ==
Chungnam Foreign Language High School enrolls approximately 400 students annually, comprising grades 10-12. The students are typically aged 15 to 18. The average class size is 20 students.

== Academics ==
In addition to studying traditional core subjects such as history and mathematics, all students at CFLHS also study two foreign languages for the duration of their high school career. The languages offered at the school's founding were English, Chinese, and Japanese, with Vietnamese being added in 2011. Each student selects a "major" and a "minor" language. Approximately 44% of the students major in English, while 29% major in Chinese, 15% in Japanese, and 12% in Vietnamese. Students who do not major in English are compelled to study English as their minor language.

== Extra curricular activities ==
The school boasts a wide variety of student-run clubs, with designated club activity time built into the school schedule. These clubs serve as opportunities for students to explore their interests, both academic and otherwise, and as such, they contribute largely to the culture of the school. Clubs are typically founded and run by students with teachers serving in supervisory roles. Among the school's most notable clubs are CFLHS Model United Nations (CMUN), English Power Speech (public speaking), and Hermes (student newspaper).

== Faculty and staff ==
The teaching staff consists of 44 Korean individuals and 10 foreign nationals, who teach foreign language courses. The school currently employs teachers from the United States, UK, Japan, China, and Vietnam. The school also employs 22 support staff. The current principal is Gong Soon Taek (공순택).

== Facilities ==
The four-story main school building includes 21 regular classrooms (not including specially designated rooms for art, music, home economics, science lab, etc.), three computer labs, multiple study spaces, and four student "cafes," each supporting a theme based on one of the four languages taught at the school. The school also has a gymnasium, an auditorium, an infirmary, a recording studio, and a library containing over 33,000 volumes. Adjacent to the main school building is the dormitory facility. Male and Female students are housed in separate buildings connected by an annex. The school cafeteria and self-study space (called Veritas Hall) are also located in this building.
