= Charlie O'Leary =

Australian rules footballer, born 1911

Personal information
- Full name: Patrick Francis O'Leary
- Born: 23 March 1911; Penshurst, Victoria
- Died: 22 December 1998 (aged 87); Footscray, Victoria
- Original team: Penshurst / Hamilton / Maffra
- Height: 179 cm (5 ft 10 in)
- Weight: 83 kg (183 lb)

Playing career^{1}
Years	Club	Games (Goals)
1933–35	Footscray	16 (0)
1936–37	Fitzroy	7 (0)
Total		23 (0)
- ^{1} Playing statistics correct to the end of 1937.

Patrick Francis "Charlie" O'Leary (23 March 1911 – 22 December 1998) was an Australian rules footballer who played with Footscray and Fitzroy in the Victorian Football League (VFL).

O'Leary later served in the Australian Army during World War II.
