= Giulia Nasuti =

Italian footballer (born 1985)

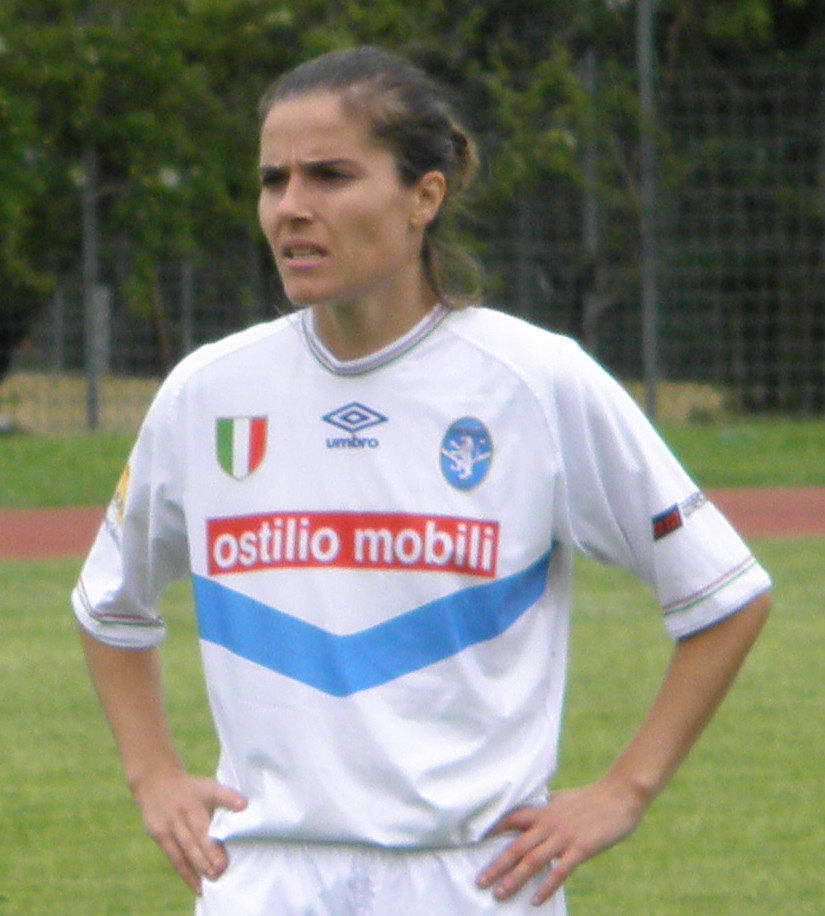

Personal information
- Date of birth: 11 May 1985 (age 41)
- Place of birth: Reggio Emilia, Italy
- Height: 1.66 m (5 ft 5 in)
- Position: Midfielder

Senior career*
Years	Team	Apps	(Gls)
2004-2011	Reggiana	111	(7)
2011-2013	Mozzanica	56	(4)
2013	→ Seattle (loan)		
2013-2015	Brescia	54	(2)
2016-2017	Reggiana	10	(0)

International career
2014	Italy	4	(0)
- * Club domestic league appearances and goals

Giulia Nasuti (born 11 May 1985) is an Italian professional footballer who plays as a midfielder for Brescia and the Italy national team.

== Career ==
Giulia was born in Reggio Emilia and at the age of 13 she began playing for Reggiana with whom she won an Italian Cup in 2010, in the summer of 2013, after two seasons in Mozzanica, she moved to Brescia where she reunited with the coach Milena Bertolini and teammates Fabiana Costi and Daniela Sabatino with whom she won the Italian Cup. After a few games she became a key player in the midfield of the swallows and thanks to her excellent performances, in January she was also called up to the national team.
