= Emma Hansberry =

Irish footballer (born 1994)

Personal information
- Date of birth: 26 May 1994 (age 32)
- Place of birth: Sligo, Ireland
- Height: 1.65 m (5 ft 5 in)
- Position: Midfielder

Team information
- Current team: Sligo Rovers
- Number: 6

Youth career
- Merville
- Strand Celtic

Senior career*
Years	Team	Apps	(Gls)
2011–2015	Castlebar Celtic		
2015–2018	Wexford Youths		
2018–2021	Northumbria University		
2022–	Sligo Rovers	65	(7)

International career^{‡}
2016	Republic of Ireland	2	(0)
- * Club domestic league appearances and goals as of 10 May 2026 ‡ National team caps and goals as of 17:17, 1 November 2020 (UTC)

Emma Hansberry (born 26 May 1994) is an Irish footballer and coach who plays for Women's National League (WNL) club Sligo Rovers. She previously represented Castlebar Celtic and Wexford Youths. An attacking midfielder, she has also represented the Republic of Ireland women's national team. In Gaelic football Hansberry played for the St Mary's club and her county, Sligo GAA.

== Club career ==
Hansberry is from Strandhill in County Sligo. At youth level she played soccer for Merville and Strandhill Celtic, as well as Gaelic football for Sligo GAA's youth teams and her school Ursuline College Sligo.

For the inaugural 2011–12 season of the Women's National League (WNL), Hansberry joined County Mayo club Castlebar Celtic. She scored seven goals and made "a string of highly impressive performances" to be named in the WNL Team of the Season and awarded the Young Player of the Year. In the 2013 FAI Women's Cup Final at the Aviva Stadium, Hansberry played well for the underdogs Castlebar Celtic, but they eventually lost 3–2 to Raheny United after extra time.

She moved to reigning WNL champions Wexford Youths during the 2015 close-season, and participated in her new club's subsequent 2015–16 UEFA Women's Champions League campaign in August 2015. In November 2015 Hansberry helped Wexford Youths win the FAI Women's Cup for the first time. In the final at the Aviva Stadium Ciara Rossiter's injury time equaliser helped them prevail over Shelbourne, 4–2 on penalties after a 2–2 draw.

Drained by travelling from Sligo to Wexford, Hansberry paused her soccer career in 2018 to attend university in Newcastle upon Tyne, England. On 11 January 2022 Hansberry became the first player to sign for Sligo Rovers' new Women's National League team. She was appointed club captain but a hamstring injury curtailed her early season appearances for the new club. In December 2023 she re-signed with Sligo ahead of the 2024 Women's Premier Division season.

== International career ==
=== Youth ===
In 2010, Hansberry was included in the Republic of Ireland U17 squad who were quarter-finalists in the 2010 FIFA U-17 Women's World Cup. She made her competitive debut in the 3–0 group stage win over Ghana, as a substitute for Aileen Gilroy. Hansberry had previously appeared in a single friendly against Northern Ireland at under-16 level.

In the absence of injured regular skipper Denise O'Sullivan, Hansberry captained the Republic of Ireland women's national under-19 football team at the 2013 UEFA Women's Under-19 Championship first qualifying round. At the FAI International Football Awards she was named 2012 Under-19 Women's International Player of the Year.

While enrolled at Institute of Technology, Sligo, Hansberry represented Ireland at the 2013 and 2015 Summer Universiades.

=== Senior ===
Hansberry was included in the senior Republic of Ireland women's national football team squad for the first time at the 2014 Cyprus Cup, but did not see any playing time during the tournament. On 5 May 2014, Ireland manager Susan Ronan named Hansberry in an experimental squad for a friendly against the Basque Country. She started Ireland's 2–0 defeat in Azpeitia, which was not classified as a full international fixture.

In May 2015, Hansberry was one of five uncapped players called-up to the national team for a friendly match in the United States. After the match had been arranged, it was discovered to be outside FIFA's designated dates for international matches, so several of Ireland's first-choice players were not released by their professional clubs.

Hansberry was recalled to the national team for the 2016 Cyprus Cup, where she won her first senior cap in a 1–0 defeat by Hungary, and appeared as an 72nd-minute substitute in a 2–0 win over Finland.

== Coaching career ==
In June 2021 Hansberry was added to the coaching staff at Sligo Rovers' women's and girls' section. In September 2021 she was present as the club announced plans to collaborate with Institute of Technology, Sligo, in fielding a senior women's team in the Women's National League from 2022.

== Personal life ==
Hansberry's aunt Bernie is married to Sligo Rovers Hall of Fame member Chris Rutherford. Between 2018 and 2021 she studied physiotherapy at Northumbria University and also appeared for the college soccer team.

== Honours ==
=== Player ===
Wexford Youths

- Women's National League: 2015–16, 2017, 2018
- FAI Women's Cup: 2015, 2018

Individual

- FAI Women's National League Young Player of the Year: 2011–12
- FAI Women's Under-19 International Player of the Year: 2012
