= Siobhán Killeen =

Irish footballer (born 1995)

Personal information
- Full name: Siobhán Killeen
- Date of birth: 15 March 1993 (age 33)
- Height: 1.69 m (5 ft 7 in)
- Position: Midfielder

Youth career
- Raheny United

College career
Years	Team	Apps	(Gls)
- UCD

Senior career*
Years	Team	Apps	(Gls)
2011–2015	Raheny United		
2015–2018	Shelbourne Ladies		

International career^{‡}
2014–	Republic of Ireland		
- * Club domestic league appearances and goals as of 17:45, 16 January 2016 (UTC) ‡ National team caps and goals as of 17:45, 16 January 2016 (UTC)

Siobhán Killeen (born 21 September 1995) is a Republic of Ireland women's international footballer. She has also played for UCD, Raheny United and Shelbourne Ladies. In 2010, she was a member of the Republic of Ireland U-17 squad that were runners-up in the 2010 UEFA Women's Under-17 Championship and quarter-finalists in the 2010 FIFA U-17 Women's World Cup. Killeen has also played senior ladies' Gaelic football for Dublin.

== Early years and education ==
Killeen grew up in the Maywood district of Raheny. As a schoolgirl she played both association football and Ladies' Gaelic football. Killeen studied Radiography at University College Dublin

== Association football ==
=== UCD ===
While attending University College Dublin, Killeen represented the women's association football team at intervarsity level, playing in teams alongside Ciara Grant, Dora Gorman and Julie-Ann Russell. In 2013–14 Killeen was a member of the UCD team that won the WSCAI Futsal Cup, defeating the holders, I.T. Sligo, 3–2 in the final at the Mardyke Arena. She also helped UCD win the WSCAI Premier Division.

=== Raheny United ===
As a schoolgirl Killeen played association football with Raheny United. While attending UCD, Killeen and Ciara Grant also played for Raheny United in the Women's National League. Killeen and Grant helped United win two successive league titles in 2012–13 and 2013–14. Killeen also helped United win three successive FAI Women's Cup between 2012 and 2014. In the 2014 final Killeen scored the winner in a 2–1 extra time win over UCD Waves. Killeen also helped United win the 2015 WNL Cup and also represented the club in both the 2013–14 and the 2014–15 UEFA Women's Champions League campaigns.

=== Shelbourne Ladies ===
During the 2015–16 Women's National League season, Killeen played with Shelbourne Ladies, helping them finish as runners-up in the FAI Women's Cup, the WNL Shield and the Women's National League. Shelbourne Ladies did manage to win the WNL Cup. In the final Killeen provided the assist that saw Leanne Kiernan clinch a 3–2 win over UCD Waves. In the 2016 FAI Women's Cup, Killeen helped Shelbourne to a 5–0 win over Wexford Youths. Just before the 2018 Women's National League season, Killeen decided to stop playing soccer, in favour of Gaelic football.

=== Republic of Ireland international ===
Killeen has represented the Republic of Ireland at under-17, under-19, university and senior level. In 2010, together with Megan Campbell, Dora Gorman, Denise O'Sullivan, Ciara Grant and Clare Shine, she was a member of the Republic of Ireland U-17 squad that were runners-up in the 2010 UEFA Women's Under-17 Championship and quarter-finalists in the 2010 FIFA U-17 Women's World Cup. Killeen made her senior debut against New Zealand at the 2014 Cyprus Cup. She has subsequently represented the Republic of Ireland in their 2015 FIFA Women's World Cup and UEFA Women's Euro 2017 qualifying campaigns. Killeen also represented Ireland at the 2013 and 2015 Summer Universiades.

== Ladies' Gaelic football ==
Siobhán Killeen
Sport
- Sport: Ladies' Gaelic football
- Position: Forward
Clubs
- Years: Club
- 201x–201x 201x–201x 201x–201x: Scoil Uí Chonaill CLG; Raheny GAA; Clontarf GAA
Inter-county
- Years: County
- 2018–: Dublin

=== Club level ===
As a schoolgirl Killeen played Ladies' Gaelic football with Scoil Uí Chonaill CLG and Raheny GAA. At senior level she has also played for Clontarf GAA.

=== Inter-county ===
Killeen has represented Dublin at various levels. In 2011 Killeen was part of the Dublin team that reached the All-Ireland Under-18 Ladies' Football Championship final, losing to Cork. In the semi-final against Galway, Killeen came on as a substitute and scored 2–0 and provided two goal assists for Lauren Ebbs. In 2018 Killeen played for the senior Dublin team in the Ladies' National Football League.

== Personal life ==
Killeen is the partner of Pearl Slattery, the Shelbourne player.

On 26 March 2020, Killeen announced she was COVID-19 positive. She returned to work in April and was reported to have recovered. In June, she sat alongside Chief Medical Officer Tony Holohan and spoke about her experience at the daily Department of Health press briefing. She contradicted the earlier suggestion that she had overcome the illness when saying she was "still on the long road to full recovery".

== Honours ==
=== Association football ===
Individual

- Women's National League Team of the Season
  - 2015–16

Raheny United

- Women's National League
  - Winners: 2012–13, 2013–14 : 2
  - Runners-up: 2011–12: 1
- FAI Women's Cup
  - Winners: 2012, 2013, 2014: 3
- WNL Cup
  - Winners: 2015: 1

Shelbourne Ladies

- FAI Women's Cup
  - Winners: 2016: 1
  - Runners-up: 2015: 1
- WNL Cup
  - Winners: 2016
- Women's National League
  - Runners-up: 2015–16
- WNL Shield
  - Runners-up: 2015

UCD

- WSCAI Premier Division
  - Winners: 2013–14
- WSCAI Futsal Cup
  - Winners: 2014

Republic of Ireland U-17

- UEFA Women's Under-17 Championship
  - Runner Up: 2010

=== Gaelic football ===
Dublin

- All-Ireland Under-18 Ladies' Football Championship
  - Runner Up: 2011
