= Buckley Park =

Stadium near Kilkenny, Ireland

Coordinates: 52.62299°N 7.28274°W

- Staid Uí Bhuachalla
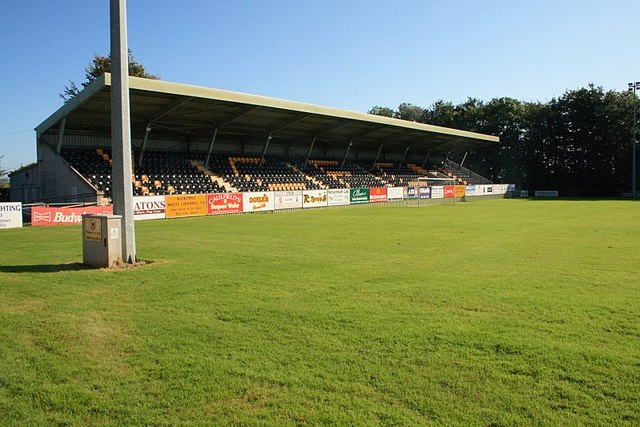
- Stand at the northern ('city') end of the ground
- Interactive map of Buckley Park
- Location: Buckley Park, Callan Road, Kilkenny
- Capacity: 3,000 (1,850 seats)
- Field size: 107 by 78 yards (98 by 71 m)

Construction
- Built: 1980s
- Opened: 1980s

Tenants
- Emfa A.F.C. 1974–1989; Kilkenny City A.F.C. 1989–2008; Kilkenny United WFC 2015–2019

Buckley Park is an association football ground on the Callan Road (N76), near Kilkenny, Ireland. The ground, originally owned by Kilkenny City AFC (formerly EMFA AFC), was initially called Tennypark, also stylised as 'Tenney Park'. Formerly the home stadium of Kilkenny City AFC, it has also previously been used by Castlewarren Celtic. Buckley Park has previously hosted a number of junior international soccer games, and six Republic of Ireland under-21 national football team games.

The ground is named in honour of Marty Buckley, the first president of EMFA / Kilkenny City. He was a former player and administrator with Green Celtic F.C. He remained involved with EMFA / Kilkenny City until the 1980s, managing youth and junior teams within the club and acting as a trustee for the club until his death.

== History ==
Emfa A.F.C. had been playing their games at St James's Park, but managed to lease new grounds at Tennypark in 1974. The venue's first major occasion came in 1976, when Tennypark played host to the FAI Oscar Traynor final between the Kilkenny & District League and the Dublin Amateur League. The event saw the Kilkenny side win a men's national soccer title for the first time.

The club eventually bought the grounds in 1979 with a £16,000 bank loan and became the first association football club in Kilkenny to purchase their own grounds. The ground, a former farmer's field, was named Buckley Park on 20 April 1983 in honour of Marty Buckley. In October 1985, Buckley Park hosted its first League of Ireland match between Emfa and Derry City. The game was a League of Ireland debut for both clubs.

In 1989, Emfa changed their name to Kilkenny City and traded their claret and blue colours for the more traditional Kilkenny colours of black and amber. In 1991, Buckley Park hosted an FAI Cup semi-final when Kilkenny City played Shamrock Rovers in an FAI Cup semi-final in front of 6,500 fans.

On 4 September 1998, Buckley Park hosted a Euro 2000 qualifier between the Republic of Ireland Under-21s and Croatia. In February 2000, the stadium was chosen as the venue for a Republic of Ireland Under-16 match against Denmark. It was again the venue for a under-21 game when the ground hosted the 2002 UEFA European Championship qualifier against Estonia in October later that year.

By the end of 2007, the ground saw its final men's League of Ireland game when Kilkenny City lost 3–1 to Finn Harps at Buckley Park and, in January 2008, Kilkenny City resigned from the league. In June 2008, Buckley Park hosted the A Championship Shield final between the reserve teams of Bohemians and Cork City. Since then, the ground has been leased by junior clubs in the Kilkenny & District League such as Freebooters, Fort Rangers, Newpark and Castlewarren Celtic.

The ground was home to Kilkenny United W.F.C. from 2015 to 2019.

In July 2025, CK United expressed an interest in potentially purchasing the venue. In January 2026, the club announced that they had signed a deal to play their home matches at Buckley Park.

== Structure and facilities ==
Buckley Park has two spectator stands; the Tennypark House Stand, which held 600 people, and the 'city end', a 1,000 seater stand that was built in the early 2000s with assistance from a National Lottery grant. The grounds have a TV gantry, floodlights and a car park.
