= 2018 Women's National League (Ireland) =

Women's National League
- Season: 2018
- Dates: 11 March – 28 October 2018
- Champions: Wexford Youths
- 2019–20 UEFA Women's Champions League: Wexford Youths
- Matches: 84
- Goals: 337 (4.01 per match)
- Top goalscorer: Rianna Jarrett (Wexford Youths, 27 goals)
- Biggest home win: Peamount United 10–1 Limerick (13 October 2018)
- Biggest away win: Limerick 1–9 Peamount United (8 July 2018); Cork City 1–9 Peamount United (28 October 2018)
- Highest scoring: Peamount United 10–1 Limerick (13 October 2018)
- All statistics correct as of 28 October 2018.

The 2018 Women's National League, known for sponsorship reasons as the Continental Tyres Women's National League, was the eighth season of the Women's National League, the highest women's association football league in the Republic of Ireland. Limerick W.F.C. competed for the first time. Wexford Youths were the winners.

== Teams ==

Team	Home town/suburb	Stadium	2017 finish
Cork City	Cork	Bishopstown Stadium	5th
Galway	Galway	Eamonn Deacy Park	6th
Kilkenny United	Kilkenny	Buckley Park	7th
Limerick	Limerick	Markets Field	n/a
Peamount United	Newcastle, County Dublin	Greenogue	2nd
Shelbourne Ladies	Santry	Morton Stadium	3rd
UCD Waves	Dún Laoghaire	Jackson Park	4th
Wexford Youths	Crossabeg	Ferrycarrig Park	1st

== Format ==
Teams play each other three times, either twice at home and once away, or once at home and twice away. Each team plays 21 games, either 10 home and 11 away, or 11 home and 10 away.

== Standings ==
Pos	Team	Pld	W	D	L	GF	GA	GD	Pts	
1	Wexford Youths (C)	21	17	3	1	60	14	+46	54	2019–20 Champions League
2	Shelbourne Ladies	21	17	1	3	66	15	+51	52	
3	Peamount United	21	14	3	4	77	22	+55	45	
4	Galway	21	8	5	8	37	31	+6	29	
5	Cork City	21	7	3	11	35	45	−10	24	
6	UCD Waves	21	5	7	9	24	35	−11	22	
7	Limerick	21	2	4	15	26	80	−54	10	
8	Kilkenny United	21	0	2	19	12	95	−83	2	

(C) Champions

== Awards ==
=== Monthly awards ===
Month	Player of the Month		References
Month	Player	Club	References
March / April	(Republic of Ireland) Amber Barrett	Peamount United	
May	(Republic of Ireland) Aislinn Meaney	Galway	
June	(Republic of Ireland) Rianna Jarrett	Wexford Youths	
July	(Republic of Ireland) Kylie Murphy	Wexford Youths	
August	(Republic of Ireland) Éabha O'Mahony	Cork City	
September	(Republic of Ireland) Niamh Farrelly	Peamount United	

=== Annual awards ===
Award	Winner	Club	References
Player of the Year	(Republic of Ireland) Rianna Jarrett	Wexford Youths	
Young Player of the Year	(Republic of Ireland) Erica Turner	UCD Waves	
Top Goalscorer	(Republic of Ireland) Amber Barrett	Peamount United	

Team of the Season
Goalkeeper	(Republic of Ireland) Erica Turner (UCD Waves)			
Defence	(Republic of Ireland) Seana Cooke (Shelbourne)	(Republic of Ireland) Éabha O'Mahony (Cork City)	(Republic of Ireland) Louise Corrigan (Peamount United)	(Republic of Ireland) Lauren Dwyer (Wexford Youths)
Midfield	(Republic of Ireland) Kylie Murphy (Wexford Youths)		(Republic of Ireland) Niamh Farrelly (Peamount United)	
Attack	(Republic of Ireland) Aislinn Meaney (Galway)	(Republic of Ireland) Rianna Jarrett (Wexford Youths)	(Republic of Ireland) Amber Barrett (Peamount United)	(Republic of Ireland) Megan Smyth-Lynch (Peamount United)
