= Källa Old Church =

- Källa gamla kyrka
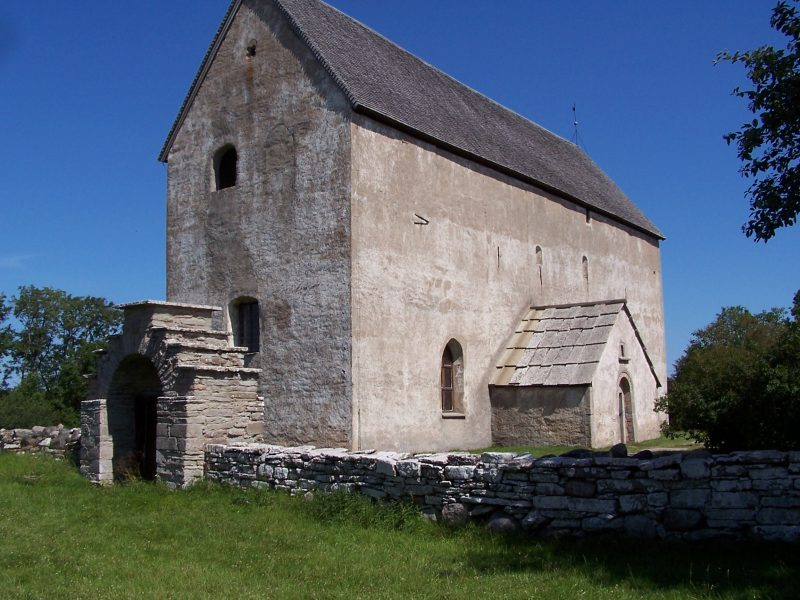
- Källa Old Church, external view

- Location within Kalmar
- 57°06′41″N 16°59′11″E
- Country: Sweden
- Denomination: Not formally a church any more, but used during summertime by the Church of Sweden
- Previous denomination: Church of Sweden

Källa Old Church (Swedish: Källa gamla kyrka, also Källa ödekyrka) is a former church on the Swedish island Öland, in the Baltic Sea. It was abandoned by its congregation during the 19th century but is still used occasionally during summer, for services, concerts, and summer weddings.

== History ==
Beneath the floor of the presently visible church building, traces of wood have been found which point to the existence of an earlier, wooden church on the same spot. This first church was probably erected during the 11th century. During the 1170s a stone tower was erected, possibly attached to the wooden church or else free-standing, and serving a defensive purpose. Subsequently during the 13th century the wooden church was replaced with the stone building now visible. The church still retains essentially the same appearance as it had at the end of the century; only minor adjustments have been made since. It is indicative of the way several fortified churches on Öland may have appeared during the Middle Ages.

The church was renovated in the 1760s and in 1802–1807, and continuously during the first half of the 19th century. However, during the 1850s it became apparent that the church had to undergo a comprehensive renovation, and in the light of this the congregation decided instead to build a new church. Källa Church was built nearby in 1888. The old church was abandoned but by decree of the Royal Swedish Academy of Letters, History and Antiquities the congregation was forbidden to destroy it. In 1911, the state allocated funds to have the church repaired and in 1928 it was decided that the church should be turned over to the Royal Swedish Academy of Letters, History and Antiquities, who still own it.

== Architecture ==
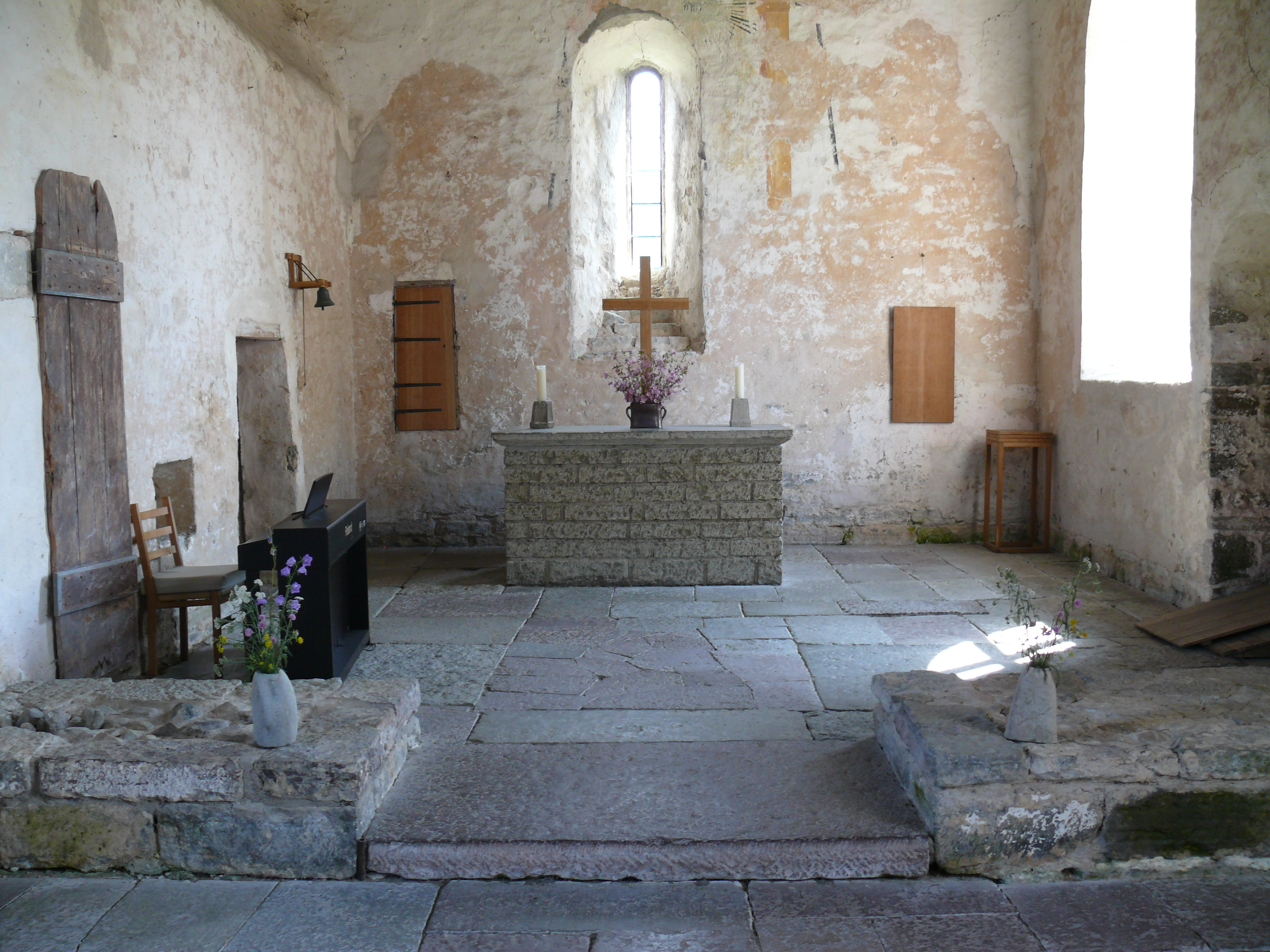
The altar of the Old Church

The building has three storeys, of which the ground floor was used as a church. Externally it retains much of its original appearance; however the sacristy is from the 1760s and the roof shingle dates from the 17th century, and minor alterations have been made throughout the centuries. Internally almost nothing remains of the original furnishings. The church was re-decorated during the early 19th century and most of these furnishings were installed in the new church when it was built, or sold. The altar is however the medieval original.
