= Taghmon Church =

- St. Munna's Church
- Tigh Munna
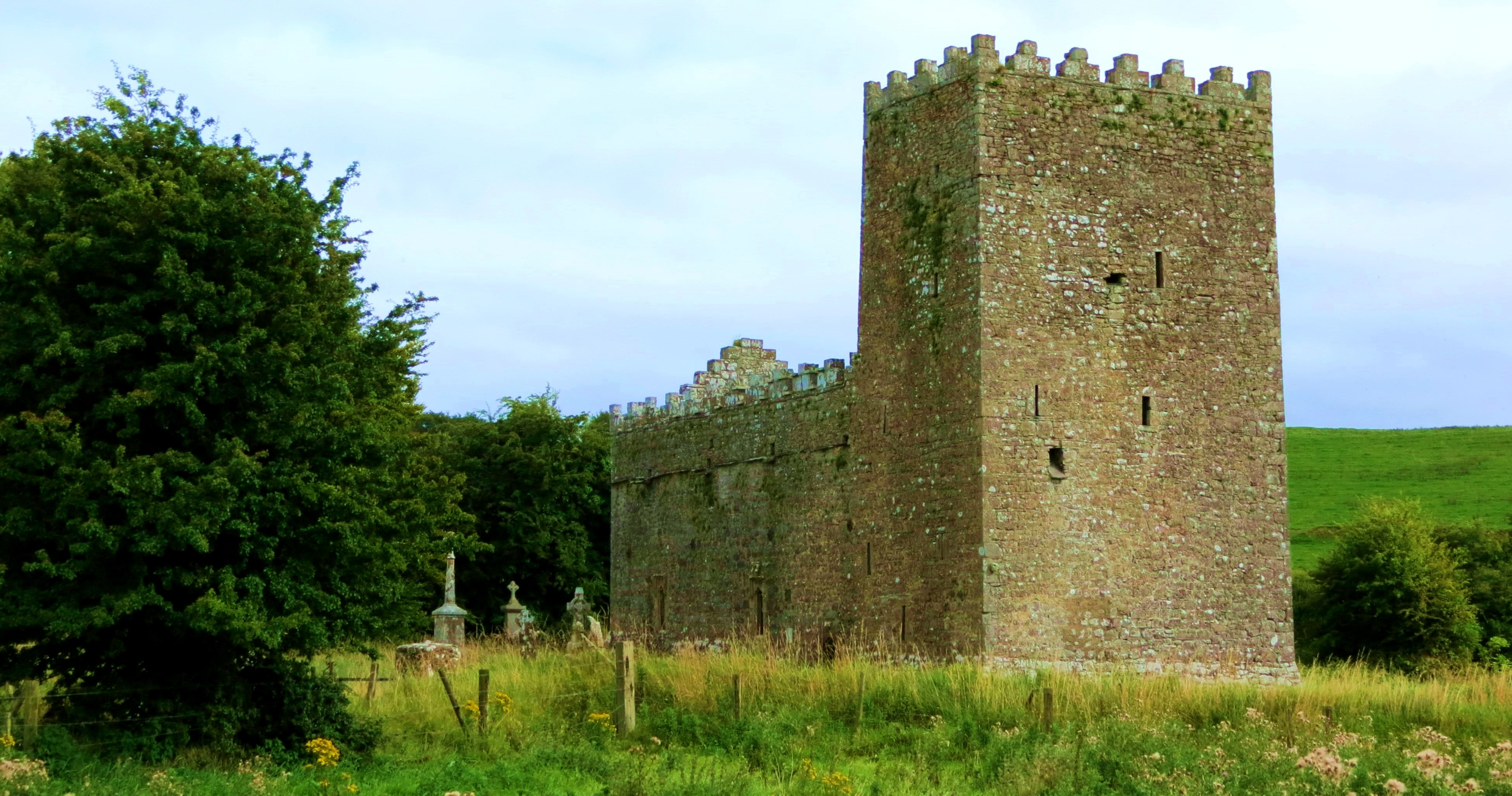

- Location within Ireland
- 53.600833°N 7.266389°W
- Location: Taghmon Glebe, Crookedwood, County Westmeath
- Country: Ireland
- Denomination: Church of Ireland
- Previous denomination: Pre-Reformation Catholic

History
- Dedication: Fintán of Taghmon (Munnu)

Architecture
- Functional status: inactive
- Years built: early 15th century

Specifications
- Materials: sandstone

Administration
- Diocese: Meath

National monument of Ireland
- Official name: Taghmon
- Reference no.: 265

Taghmon Church (/ˈtækmən/) is a fortified church and National Monument in County Westmeath, Ireland.

== Location ==
Taghmon Church is located 1.8 km (1.1 mi) east of Crookedwood, southeast of Lough Derravaragh.

== History ==
A monastery was established on the site in the 6th or 7th century by Fintán, also called Munna or Munnu. St. Munna's was built as a fortified church in the early 15th century. It was plundered by Farrell Mageoghegan in 1452. After the Reformation the church passed to the Nugent family. It was almost ruined by 1622. The church is recorded as being in use again by the Church of Ireland by 1755 and was restored extensively in 1843.

== Church ==
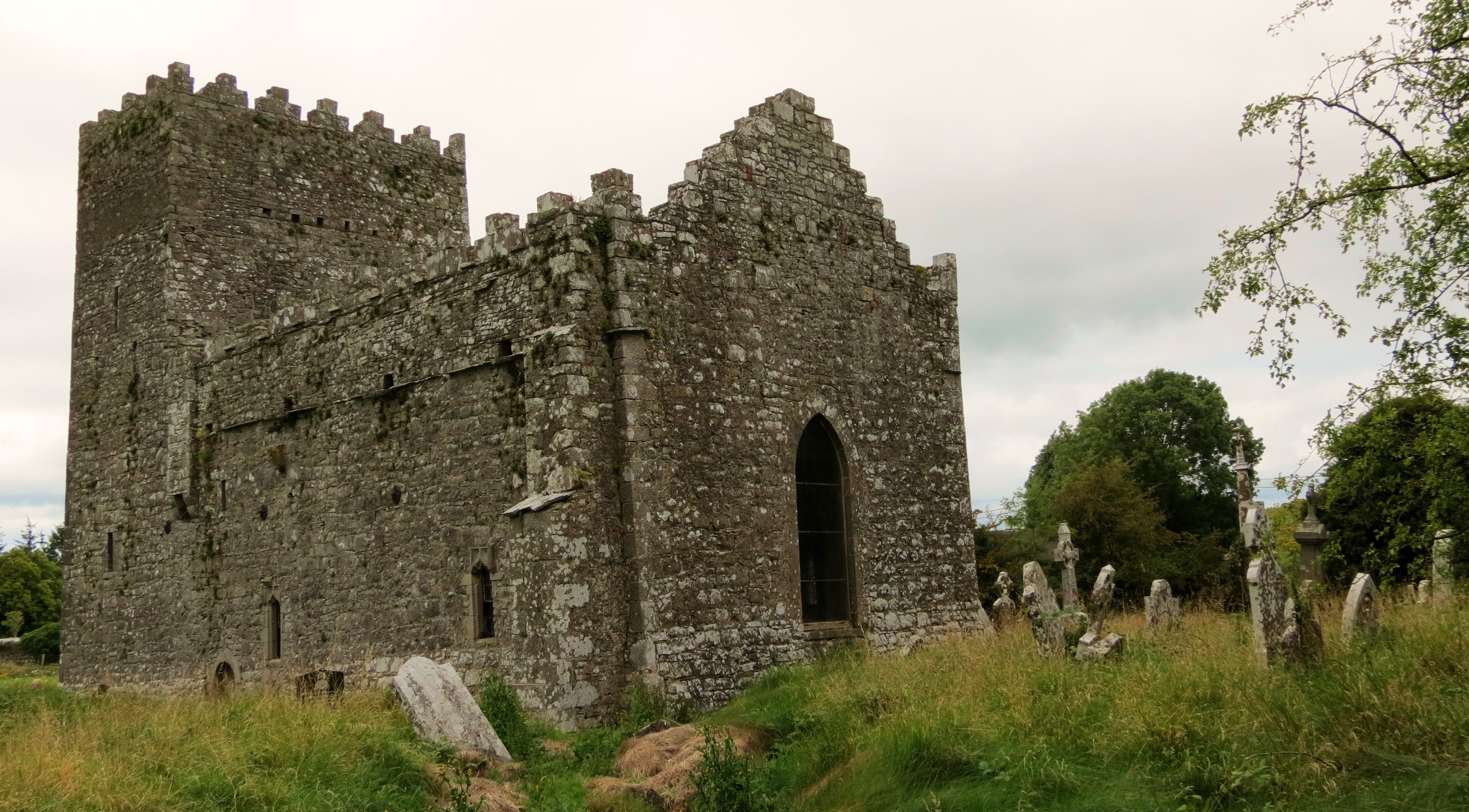
Another view of the church, Note the distinctive "Irish crenellations."

The church is a single cell with a barrel-vaulted roof. It has battlements with Irish crenellations and a machicolation above the door. The church and tower also have a pronounced base-batter. The tall tower at the west end of the church provided security for the clergy. There is a sheela-na-gig above the first window of the north wall.

The tower is four storeys high, with vaulted ceilings over the first and third storeys. The second floor was the living area, with fireplace, window seats and a slop stone (a channel through the thickness of a wall for the disposal of waste water). Above this was a bedroom and garderobe.
