= St. Andrew's Church, Kraków =

Roman Catholic church in Kraków, Poland

Church of St. Andrew
- Kościół św. Andrzeja
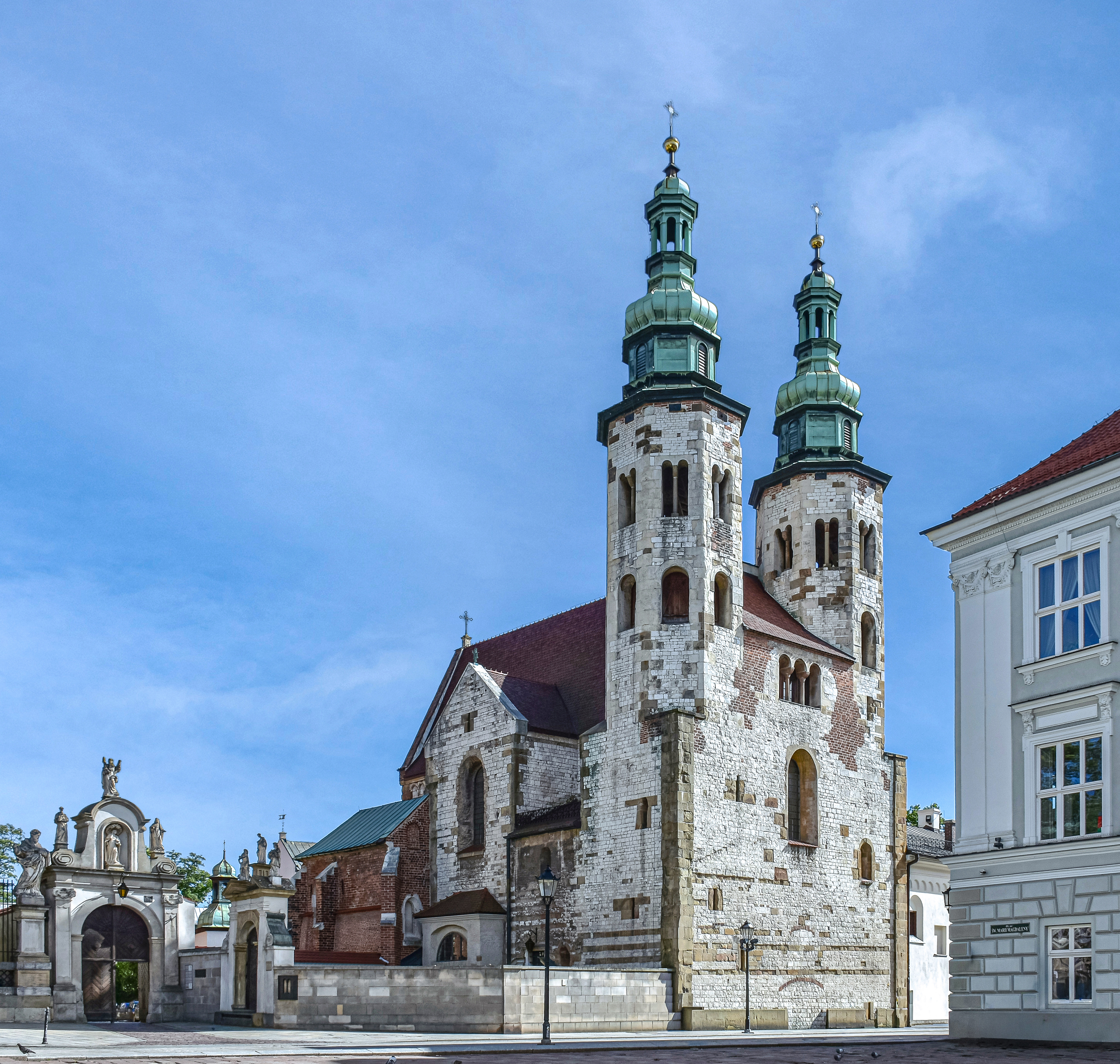
- View of church from the St. Maria Magdalena Square
- Church of St. Andrew
- Location: 54 Grodzka Street; Kraków
- Country: Poland
- Denomination: Roman Catholic

History
- Founder: Palatine Sieciech
- Consecrated: 1098

Architecture
- Style: Romanesque; Baroque
- Groundbreaking: 1079
- Completed: 1098

Specifications
- Materials: Brick and limestone

Administration
- Archdiocese: Kraków

UNESCO World Heritage Site
- Type: Cultural
- Criteria: iv
- Designated: 1978
- Part of: Historic Centre of Kraków
- Reference no.: 29bis

Historic Monument of Poland
- Designated: 1994-09-08
- Part of: Kraków historical city complex
- Reference no.: M.P. 1994 nr 50 poz. 418

The Church of St. Andrew (Polish: Kościół św. Andrzeja) is a historic Roman Catholic conventual church of the Order of Saint Clare located at 54 Grodzka Street in the Old Town of Kraków, Poland.

It is a Romanesque church built between 1079 and 1098 by a medieval Polish statesman Palatine Sieciech. It is a rare surviving example of the European fortress church used for defensive purposes.

Built in Romanesque style, it is one of the oldest buildings in Kraków and one of the best-preserved Romanesque buildings in Poland. It was the only church in Kraków to withstand the Mongol attack of 1241. Along the lower part of the broader section of its façade are small openings that served as defensive windows at a time when the church was a place of refuge from military assaults.

From 1320 it was used by the Religious Order of Poor Clares. The building has been renovated many times. The present Baroque interiors have decorations by Baltazar Fontana, paintings by Karol Dankwart and gilded altars. The Baroque domes atop the octagonal towers were added in 1639.

== History ==
The church is possibly the best preserved example of early Romanesque architecture in the city of Kraków and in Poland. The massive building was constructed from stone blocks towards the end of the 11th century, and also fulfilled important defensive functions. The two octagonal looking towers, with the doubled arcade windows are perfect examples and characteristic of Romanesque architecture. They extend high over the body of the church. The apse decorated with a modest arcade freeze and numerous details (including stairs and window frames) maintain the same character.

The structure was probably expanded, extended and strengthened up until the mid-12th century. The church successfully withstood the Tatar-Mongol raid of 1241, providing shelter for the majority of residents and inhabitants of the city. At that time, it was – quite rightly – called "the lower castle" to be distinguished from the nearby "upper" standing on top of the Wawel Hill. It was also sometimes referred to as the second church of Kraków after the Wawel Cathedral. In 1320, the church was entrusted to the Order of Poor Clares, whose convent was built south of the church. Also the brick, Gothic oratorio that today plays the role of the sacristy dates back to that period.

The baroque decoration of the interior, with rich stucco decoration by Italian painter and architect Baldassare "Baltazar" Fontana, comes from the refurbishment that took place after 1700, while the construction of the high altar, attributed to Francesco Placidi was initiated in the upcoming years. Attention is drawn to the pulpit in the shape of a boat, and the musical choir with 18th-century organ in the chancel, decorated in the rococo manner. The baroque steeples added in 1639 contrast with the severity of the Romanesque form of the church.

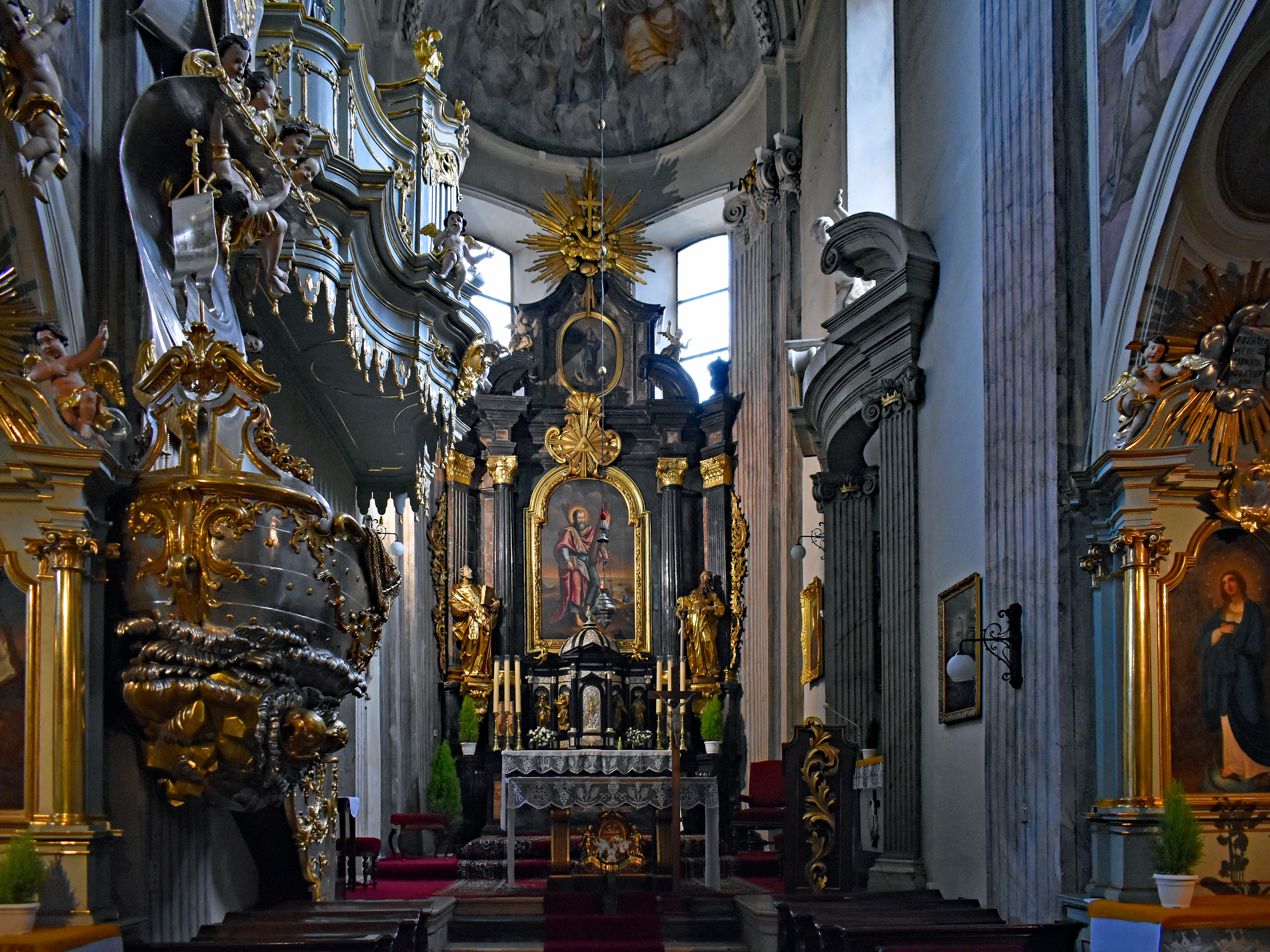
Interior of St. Andrew's Church

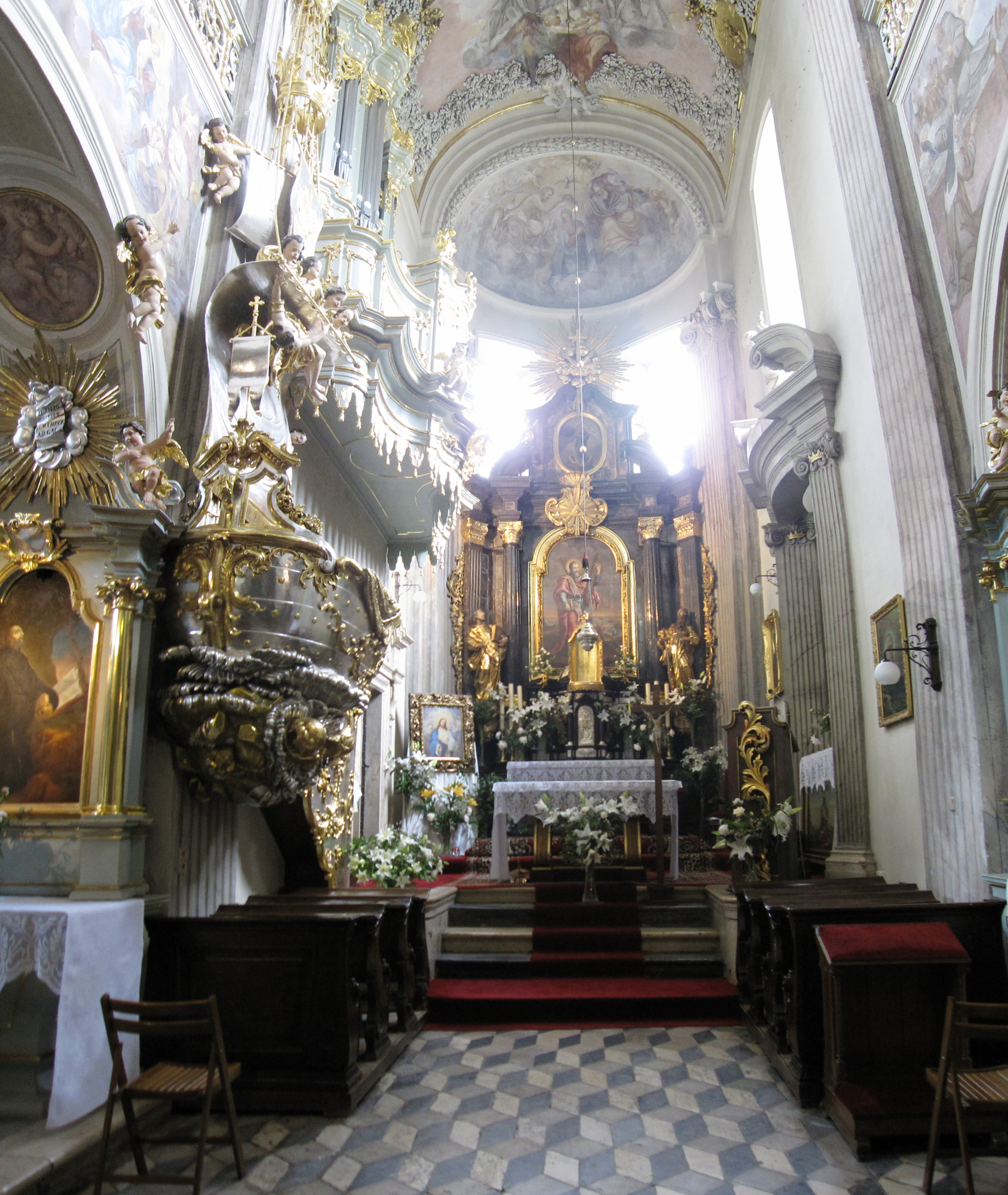
Baroque-rococo architecture inside

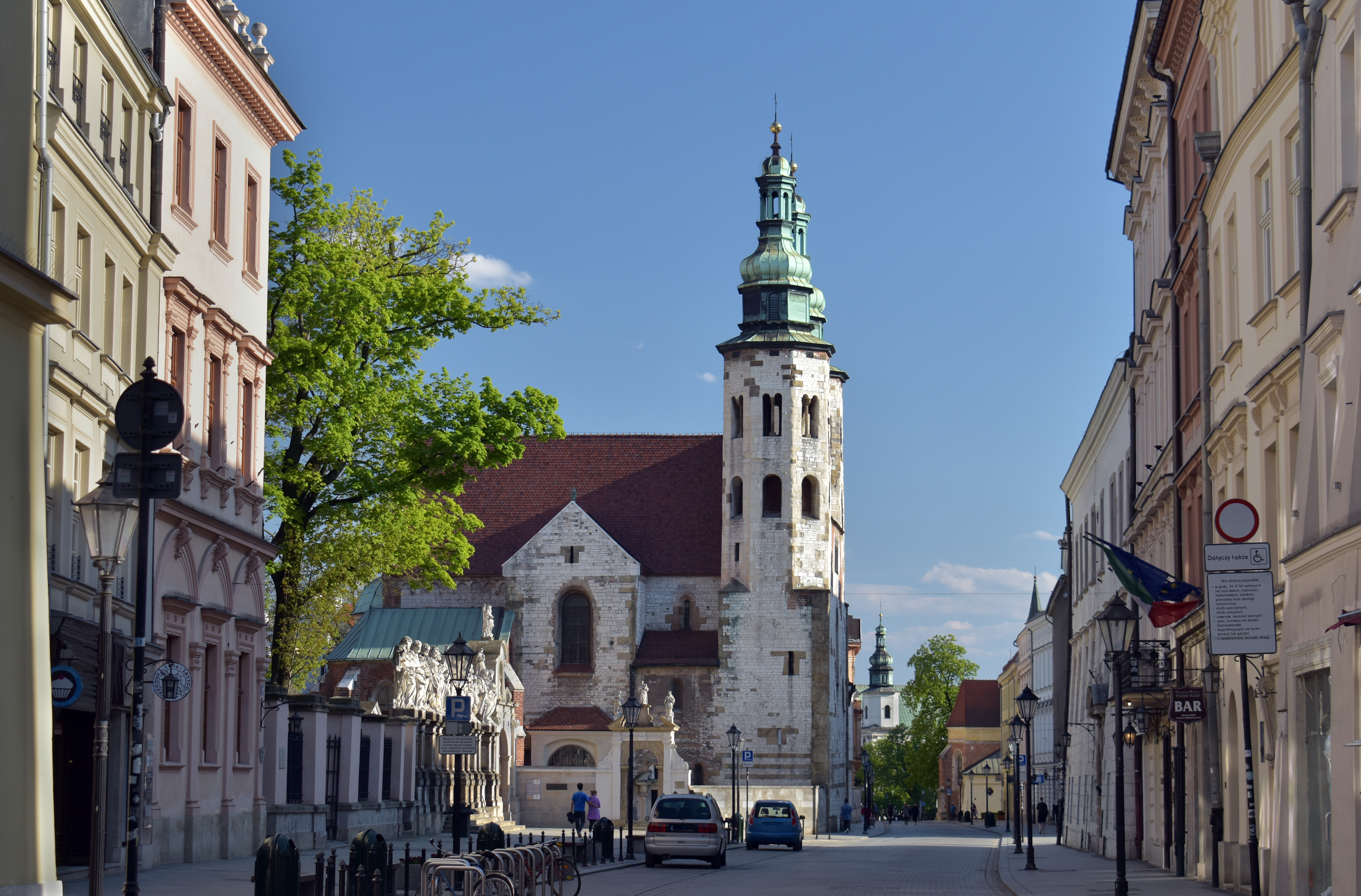
View from Grodzka Street (from N)

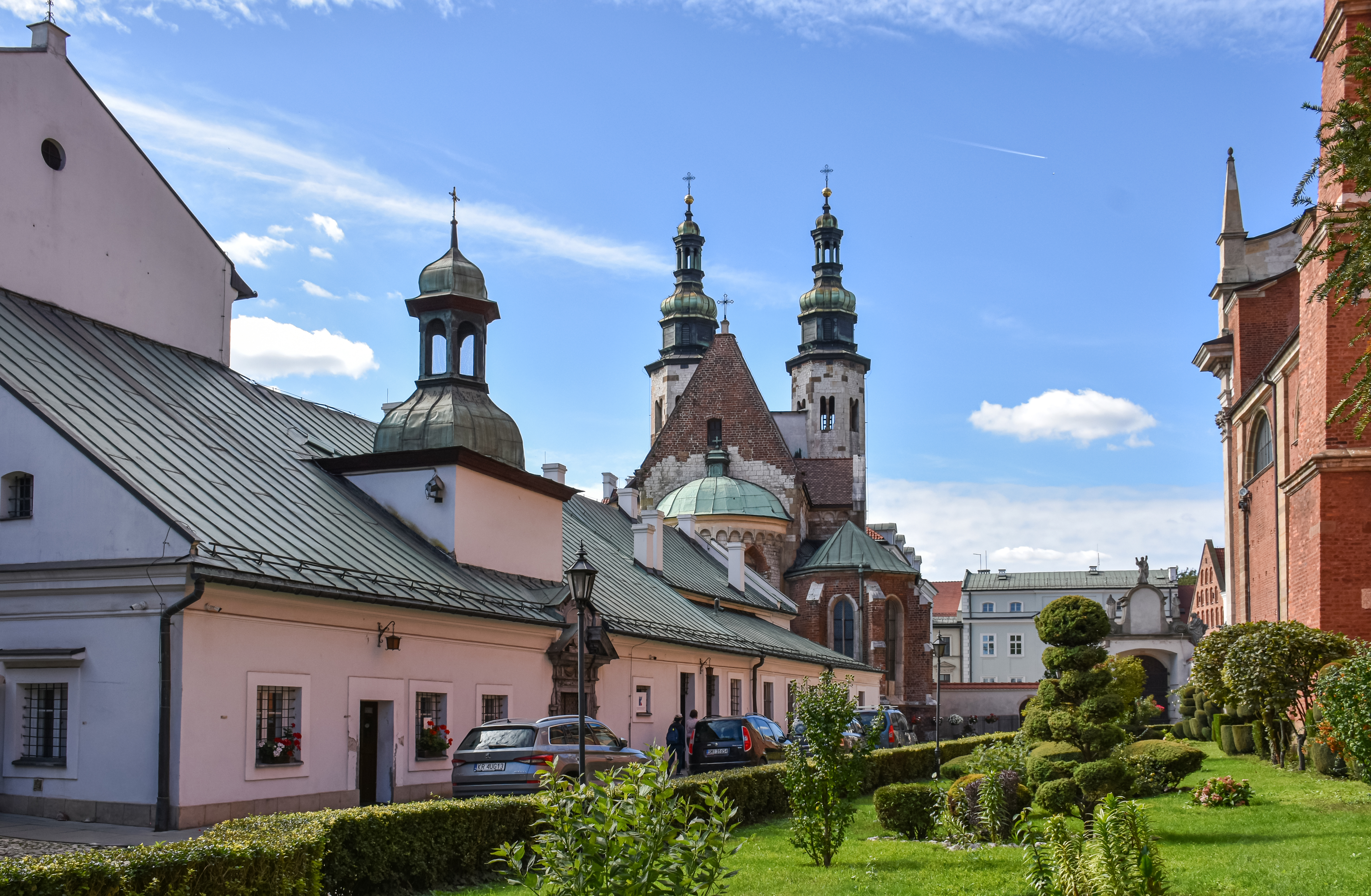
Monastery of the Poor Clares
