= Newcastle, County Dublin =

Village in south-west County Dublin, Ireland

Newcastle An Caisleán Nua
- Village
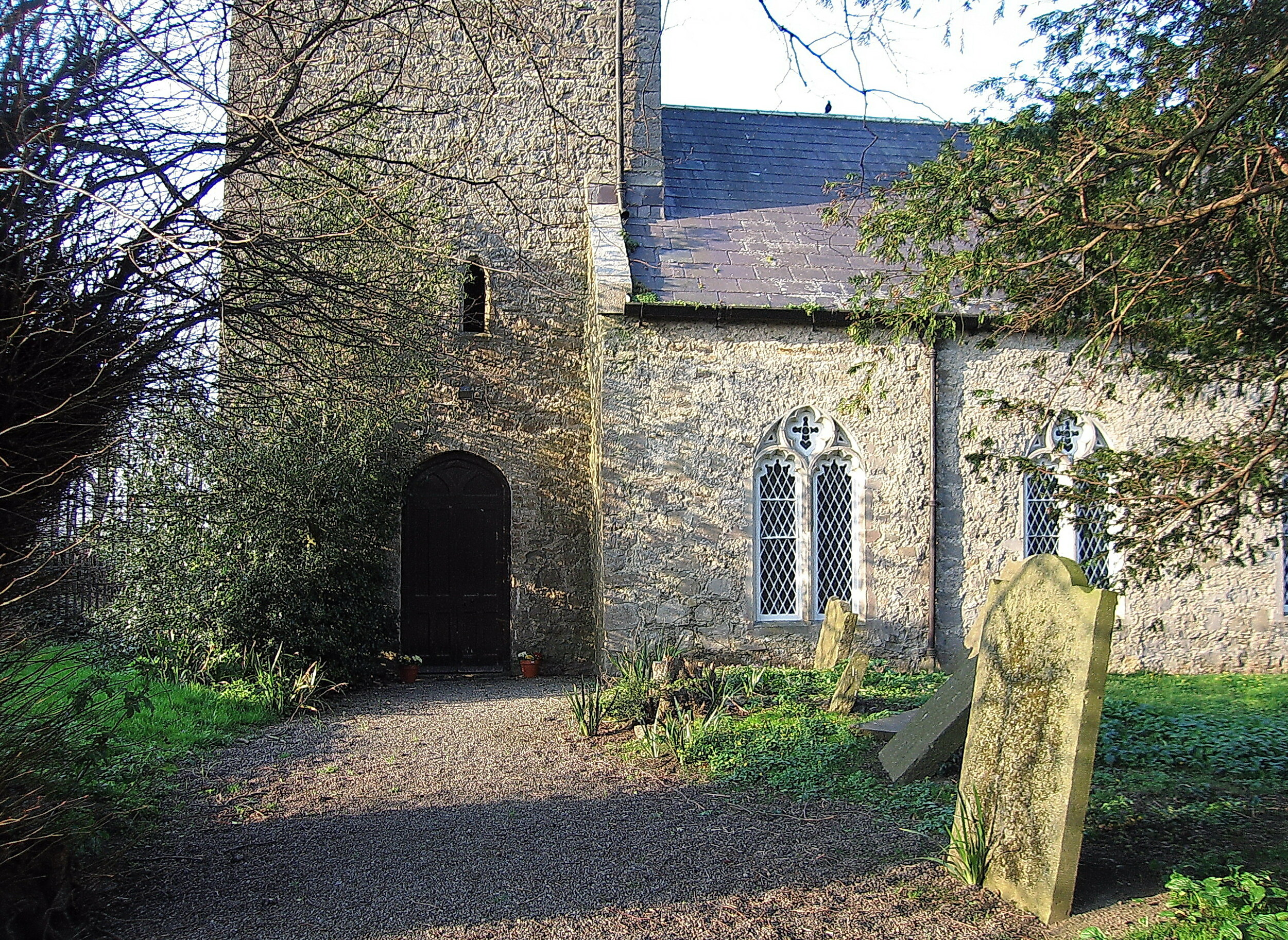
- St Finian's Church in Newcastle adjoins an earlier residential fortified tower

- Location in Ireland
- Coordinates: 53°18′N 6°30′W
- Country: Ireland
- Province: Leinster
- County: County Dublin
- Local government area: South Dublin

Population (2022)
  - Total: 4,526
- Time zone: UTC+0 (WET)
  - Summer (DST): UTC-1 (IST (WEST))
- Eircode routing key: D22

Newcastle (Irish: An Caisleán Nua) is a village in County Dublin, Ireland, south-west of Dublin city. It is also a civil parish in the historical barony of the same name. It was the location of the castle of the barony, which in historical and official documents is described as Newcastle-Lyons. The area is still primarily rural in nature. Newcastle village is within the administrative area of South Dublin County Council.

== History ==
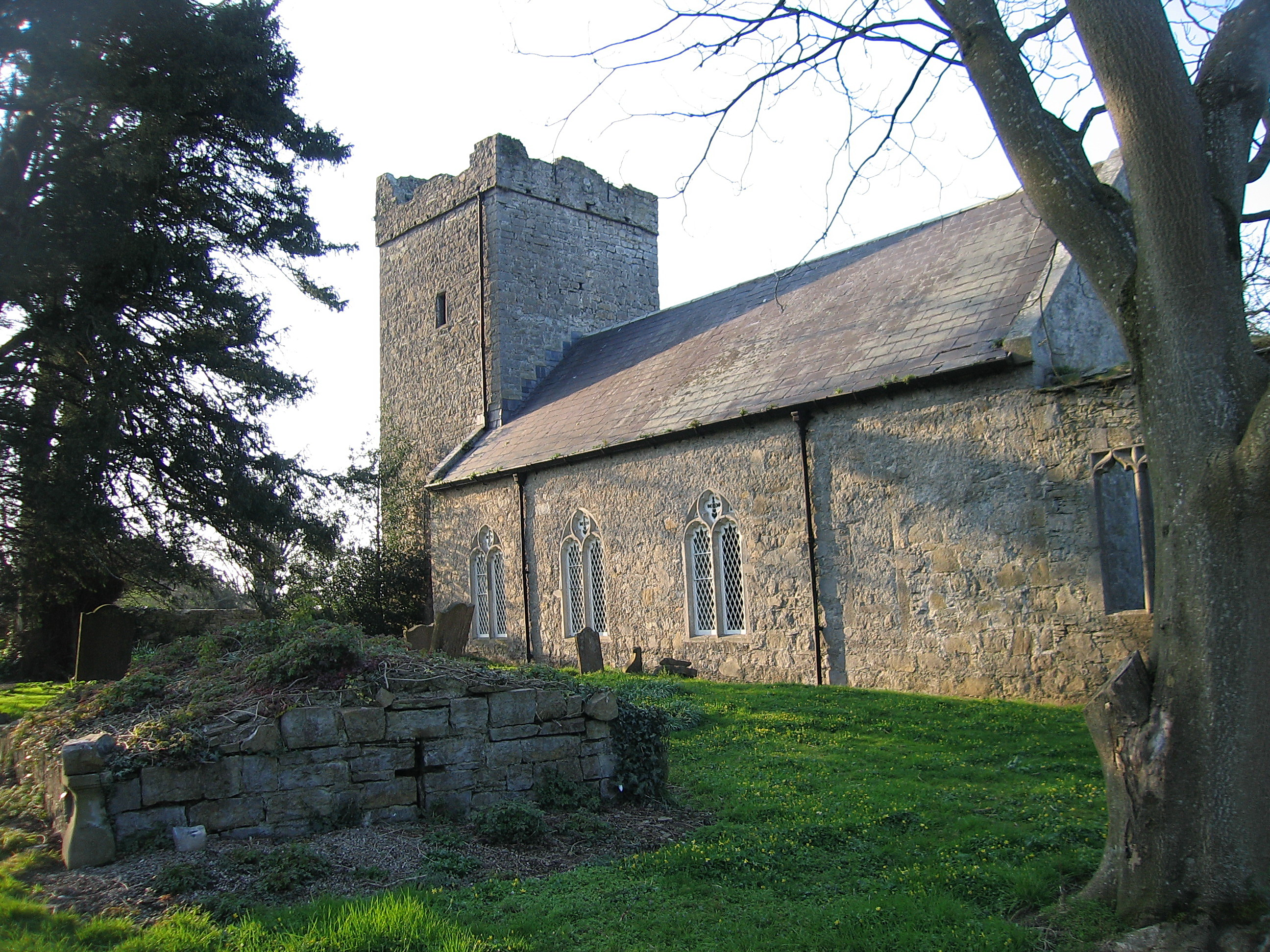
St Finian's (COI) church in Newcastle dates from at least the 15th century

Evidence of ancient settlement in the Newcastle area include a number of ringfort, fulacht fiadh and tower house sites in the townlands of Newcastle Farm, Newcastle North, Newcastle South and Ballynakelly. A raised motte, dated to the 12th century Norman invasion of Ireland, is located close to the medieval church in Newcastle, St Finian's Church, Newcastle. The existing pre-reformation Irish Church premises continued in use as a place of worship by the established Church of Ireland. The former residential tower fortification of the castle now forms part of St Finian's Church of Ireland church. It was built originally in the late 14th century. The eastern stained glass window of the church serves as an unofficial symbol of Newcastle village and features on the crest of Saint Finian's National School.

A new Catholic Church was built in 1813. This followed the opening up of Catholic worship in the relaxation of the penal laws from 1778 culminating in the Roman Catholic Relief Act 1793 passed by the Irish Parliament.

The parliamentary borough of Newcastle elected two MPs to the Irish House of Commons from 1613 to 1801. It was disfranchised by the Acts of Union 1800.

== Location and population ==
Newcastle-Lyons is located at the junction of the R120 and the R405 regional roads. It lies approximately 3 km north of the N7 at Rathcoole, 6 km south-east of Celbridge, and 9 km west of Tallaght. The village lies west of Casement Aerodrome (Baldonnell), the HQ of the Irish Air Corps. It features a public house and two churches. Peamount Hospital, a facility for long-term care, is 2 km north of the town centre on the R120. The 2001 census registered a village population of 1,160, but the surrounding area has grown rapidly since then, with the population almost quadrupling by 2022 to 4,526. This growth included, for example, new housing developments at Graydon off the village's main street.

== Transport ==
Newcastle-Lyons is served by the number 68 bus to the city centre. It is also connected to the rail network via the nearby train station of Hazelhatch and Celbridge. An orbital bus service, route W6, was also introduced to connect Newcastle to Maynooth, Celbridge, Hazelhatch, Saggart, Citywest and The Square shopping centre in Tallaght.

== Sport ==
Newcastle-Lyons is home to St Finian's Newcastle GAA club (Irish: CLG Naomh Finnéin), which was founded in 1943. In 1949, the club won the Dublin Intermediate Championship.

The association football (soccer) club, Peamount United F.C., is also based in the area. Founded in 1983, the club is based in a purpose-built facility in Greenogue, Newcastle. In the 2011–12 season Peamount United's ladies team became the first Irish club to qualify for the UEFA Women's Champions League. Peamount United's male adult team plays in the Senior 1 division of the Leinster Senior League. The ladies' team plays in the Women's National League.

Elm Hall Golf Club is located near Newcastle at Hazelhatch. It features two 18-hole pitch and putt courses.

== See also ==
- List of subdivisions of County Dublin
- List of towns and villages in the Republic of Ireland
