= Fortified church =

Church built to serve a defensive role in times of war

A fortified church is a church that is built to serve a defensive role in times of war. Such churches were specially designed to incorporate military features, such as thick walls, battlements, and embrasures. Others, such as the Ávila Cathedral were incorporated into the town wall. Monastic communities, such as Solovki Monastery, are often surrounded by a wall, and some churches, such as St. Arbogast in Muttenz, Switzerland, have an outer wall as well. Churches with additional external defences such as curtain walls and wall towers are often referred to more specifically as fortress churches or Kirchenburgen (literally "church castles").

Most fortified churches date back to time periods in Europe that were plagued by frequent conflict, for example ones in the Dordogne region of France, fought over by France and England in medieval times, and in Transylvania, during the Ottoman invasions. Fortified churches were also built in places controlled by colonial empires, such as one in the Philippines at the scene of the siege of Baler.

== United States ==
There are many examples of fortified churches in American history with many still intact. One example is the fortified church in the called the Alamo Mission which was originally a chapel created from a Spanish Mission but was repurposed as defensive for the Battle of the Alamo. Other examples are the multiple churches in the Appalachian region that served as a church and a safe place where settlers could go for a safe retreat.

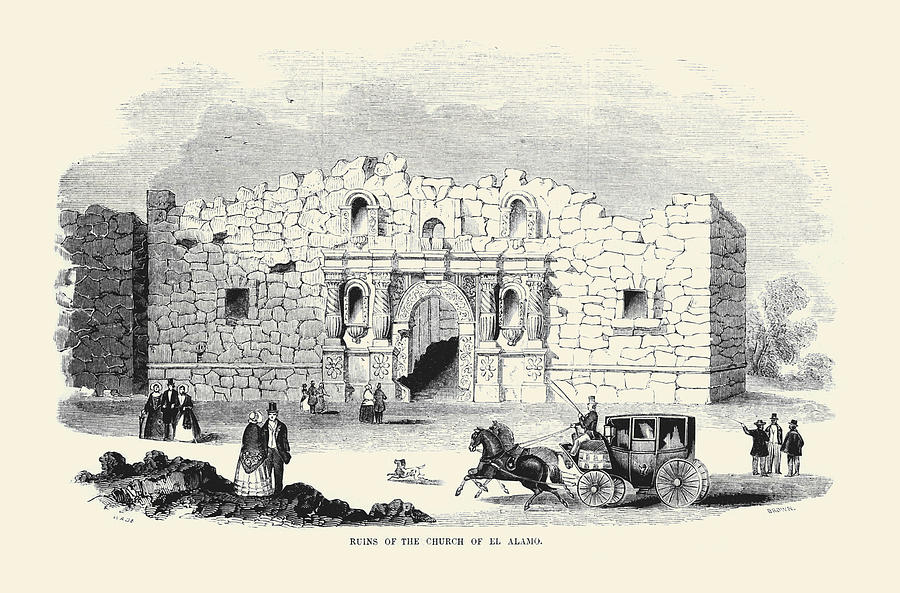
A painting of the Alamo Church Ruins

== Belarus ==
Although many fortified churches in various styles existed in the lands of Belarus, only a handful survived until the present. The most famous include Christian Orthodox churches in Muravanka, and Synkavichy, as well as Catholic fortified churches in Kamai and Ishkold'. In addition to Christian churches Belarus also has the ruins of several fortified synagogues, of which the Chief Synagogue in Bykhaw is most notable.

== France ==
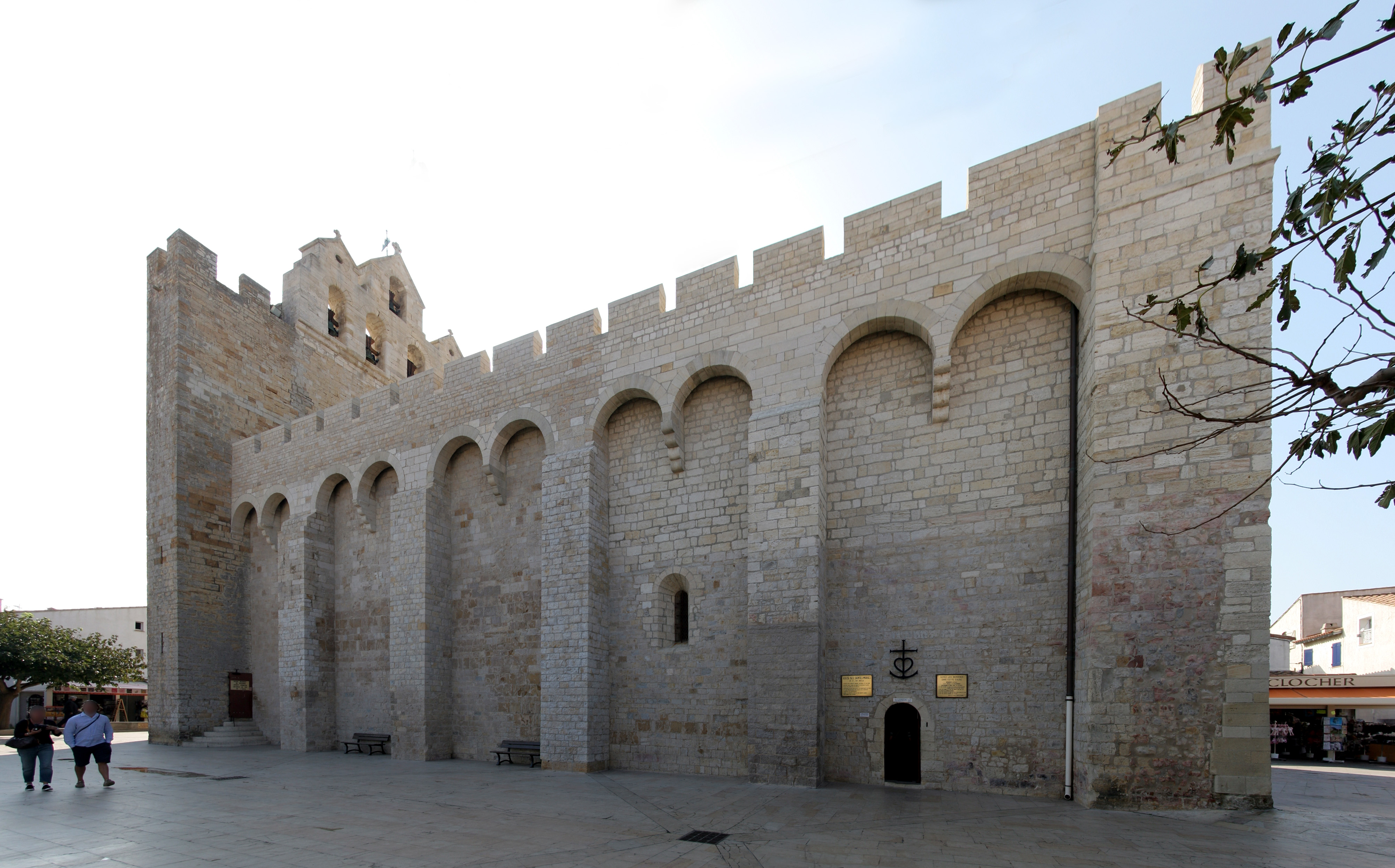
Church of the Saintes Maries de la Mer

About 65 fortified churches are found in the Thiérache region of northern France, near the Belgian border. They were built here because it was a major land passage on the border between Champagne and Picardy. As a result, the area was frequently under attack.

== Germany ==
Several fortified churches have been preserved, especially in the German states of Baden-Württemberg, Bavaria and Hesse. Examples are the churches of Kleinbreitenbach in Plaue, Kößlarn, Grafengehaig, Großrückerswalde, Mittelsaida, Büchenbach/Erlangen, Kriegenbrunn/Erlangen, Morsbach/Künzelsau, Espendfeld/Arnstadt, Finkenbach-Gersweiler, St. Wolfgang in Rothenburg, and the fortified church of Wenkbach.

== Ireland ==
Several fortified churches survive from the medieval period, including Hospital Church (Knights Hospitaller), Taghmon Church, Old St. Mary's Church, Clonmel and St Finian's Church, Newcastle.

== Poland ==
A rare surviving example of a fortress church used for defensive purposes is the Church of St. Andrew in Kraków, one of the oldest and best preserved Romanesque buildings in Poland. Located at Grodzka Street, it was built by a medieval Polish statesman Palatine Sieciech in 1079–1098. St. Andrew was the only Romanesque church in Kraków to withstand the Mongol attack of 1241.

== Portugal ==
Some medieval fortified churches, monasteries, and cathedrals survive in Portugal. These buildings were built either in Romanesque or Gothic styles. Romanesque examples are the Lisbon Cathedral and the Old Cathedral of Coimbra. Gothic examples are the Church of Leça do Balio and the Guarda Cathedral.

== Romania ==
The southeastern Transylvania region in Romania has among the highest numbers of existing fortified churches built from the 13th to 16th centuries, in the Kingdom of Hungary. More than 150 villages in the area count various types of fortified churches, seven of them being included in the UNESCO World Heritage under the name of Villages with fortified churches in Transylvania.

The northern Moldavia region also preserves numerous fortified religious buildings as a testimony of the architectural style developed in the Principality of Moldavia. Of these, eight Romanian Orthodox Churches from the 15th to 16th centuries are inscribed by UNESCO on the World Heritage List.

== Russia ==
Medieval limestone churches of Russia sometimes resembled towers and could be used for defensive purposes. At least three churches in the Moscow and Tver regions have been described as purpose-built defensive structures: namely, Kamenskoye Church, Gorodishche Church, and Gorodnya Church.

== Slovenia ==
During the Ottoman-Habsburg Wars from the late 15th to the late 17th century, the Slovene Lands were subjected to constant Ottoman raids, which reached their peak in the late 15th and early 16th century. During that period, around 300 village churches were fortified in the territory of present-day Slovenia, with another 50 in the neighboring area of southern Carinthia.

They were known as tabors (which in modern Slovene means "camp"). A dozen of such churches remain today, the most famous of which are the Holy Trinity Church in Hrastovlje, Mount Saint Mary near Ljubljana, and Podbrezje in Upper Carniola.

In some cases, entire villages were fortified. Remaining examples are Šmartno in the Gorizia Hills, and Štanjel.

== Ukraine ==
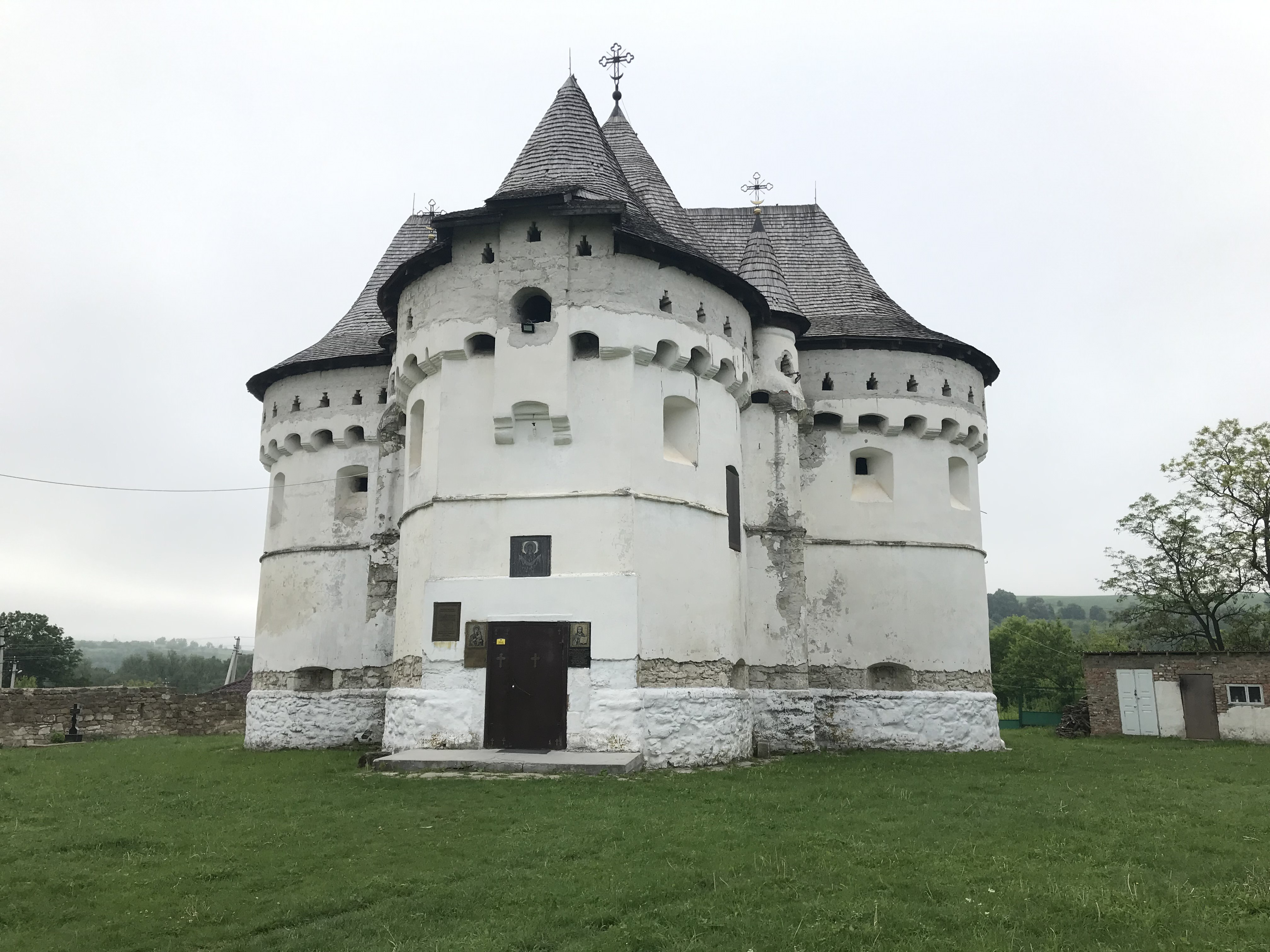
Holy Intercession Church in the village of Sutkivtsi, Podolia, Ukraine

In Ukraine fortified churches were mostly constructed in a time period between the late 14th and the late 17th century in the western and central parts of modern Ukraine, most notably Galicia and Dnieper Ukraine. Some of these churches were constructed atop of existing fortifications and were extensively modified in later years, sometimes losing their sturdy appearance.

== United Kingdom ==
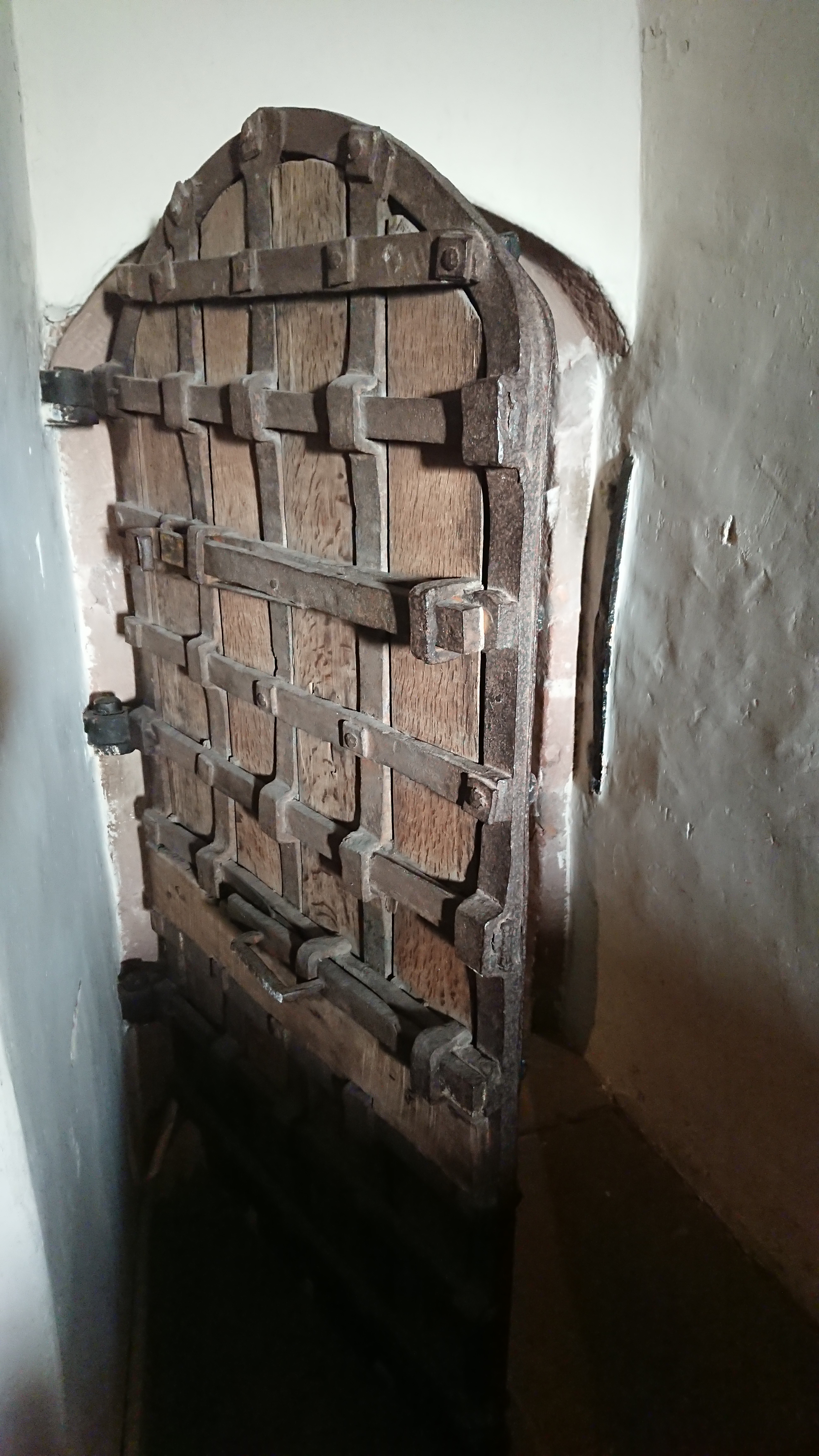
Yett or iron-barred door at St Cuthbert's Church in Great Salkeld, Cumbria, guarding access to the tower.

There are several medieval fortified churches near the Anglo-Scottish border, where defence was an important consideration until the 17th century, when England and Scotland were united in personal union under King James VI and I. All Saints' Church, Boltongate in Cumbria is a fortified church with a fireproof stone-vaulted roof. Also in Cumbria, St Michael's Church, Burgh by Sands has a defensive tower, and originally had two. The west tower retains its yett, a door made of interlocking iron bars to repel attackers. An even more formidable yett can be seen at St Cuthbert's Church, Great Salkeld, where the ground floor of the tower is tunnel-vaulted, and supports a fireplace above, enabling the tower to be habitable as a place of refuge. The tower of St John the Baptist's Church in Newton Arlosh is also tunnel-vaulted with very small windows, and has no outer doorway to the churchyard. Entry was inside at first-floor level.

Defensive towers can also be found on the England–Wales border, for instance St Michael's Church, in Garway, Herefordshire.

== Gallery ==
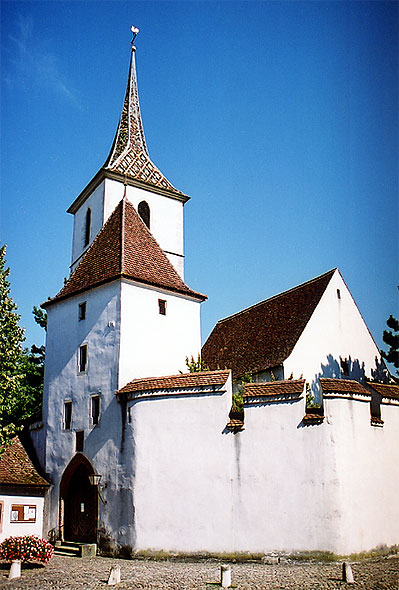
Fortified church in Muttenz, Switzerland

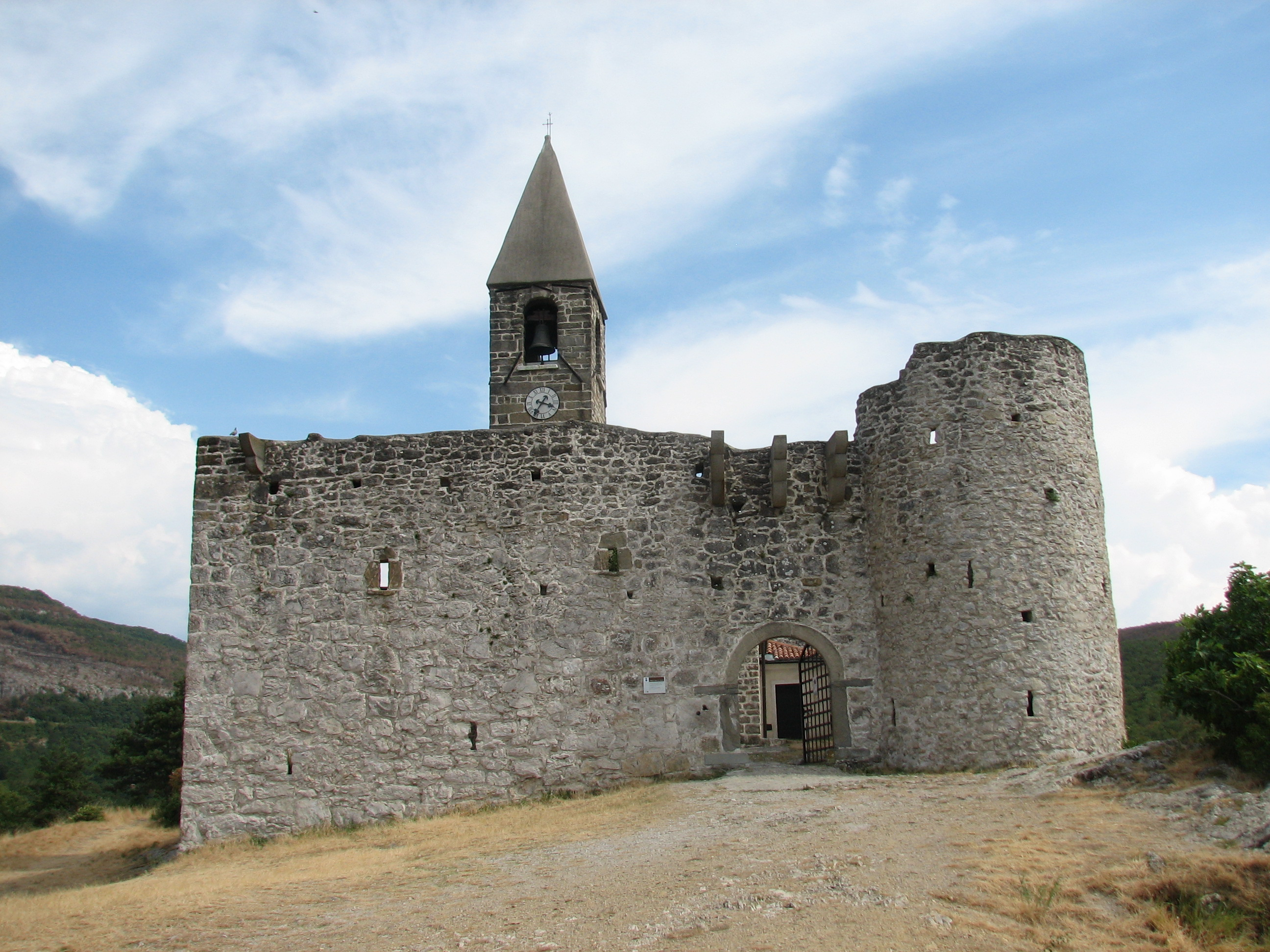
Holy Trinity Church in Hrastovlje, Slovenia

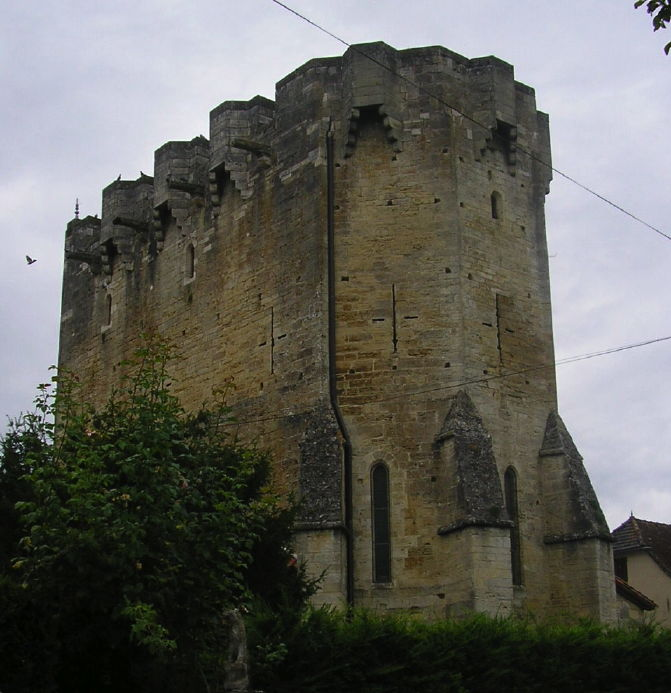
Castle-church of Rudelle, France

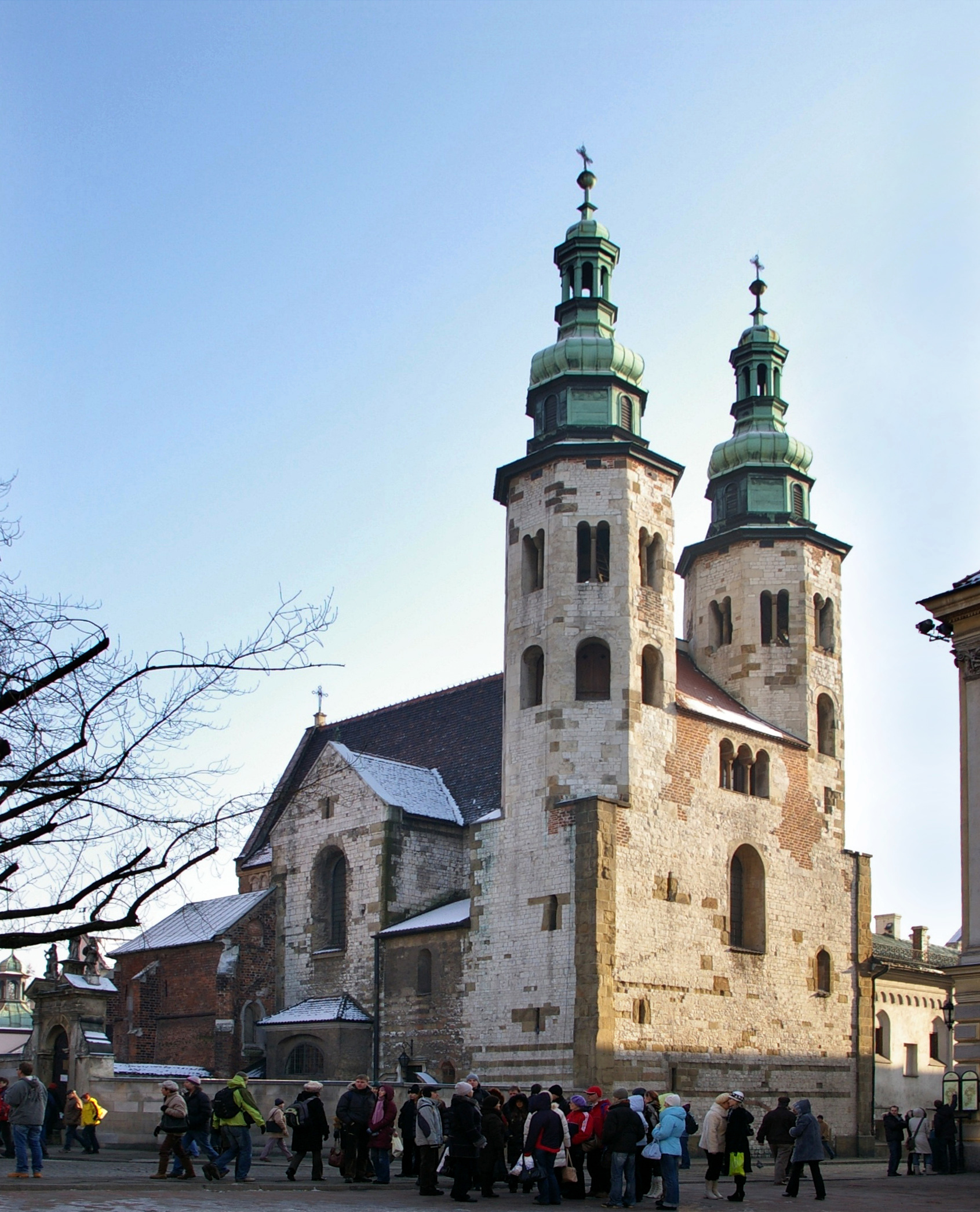
St. Andrew's Church, Kraków, Poland

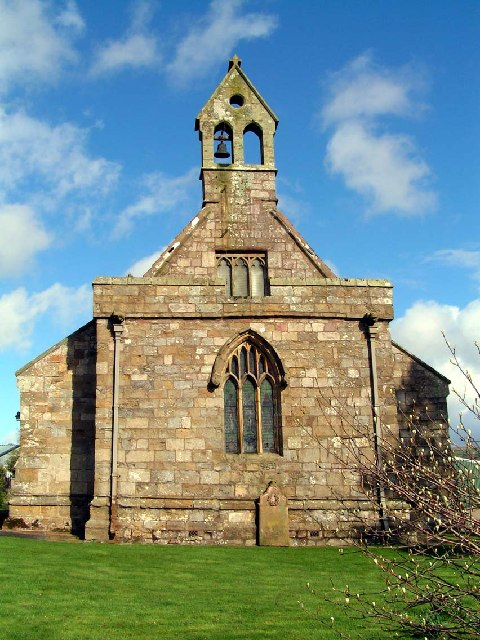
All Saints Church, Boltongate, England, with defensive parapet

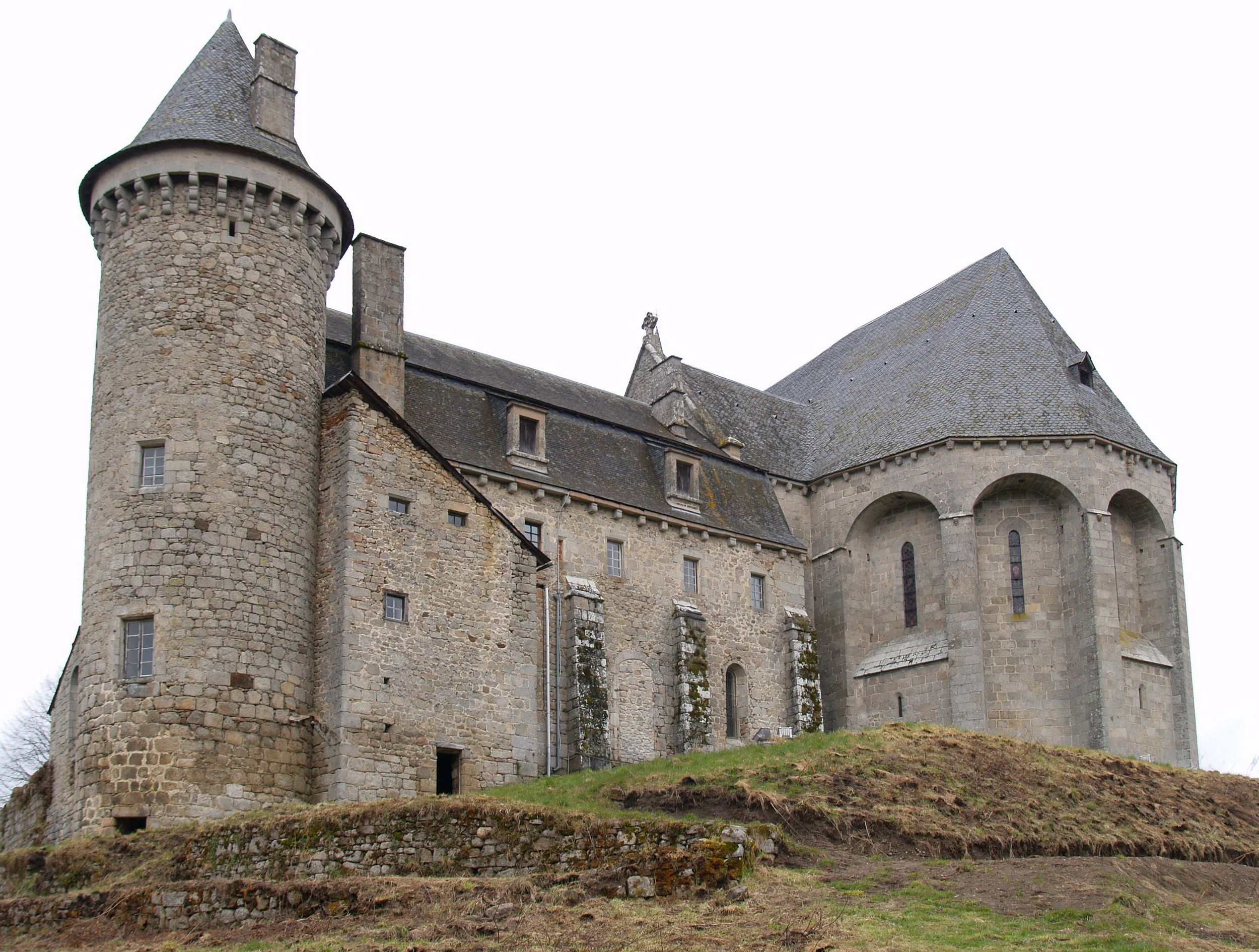
Fortified church in Saint-Angel, Corrèze, France.

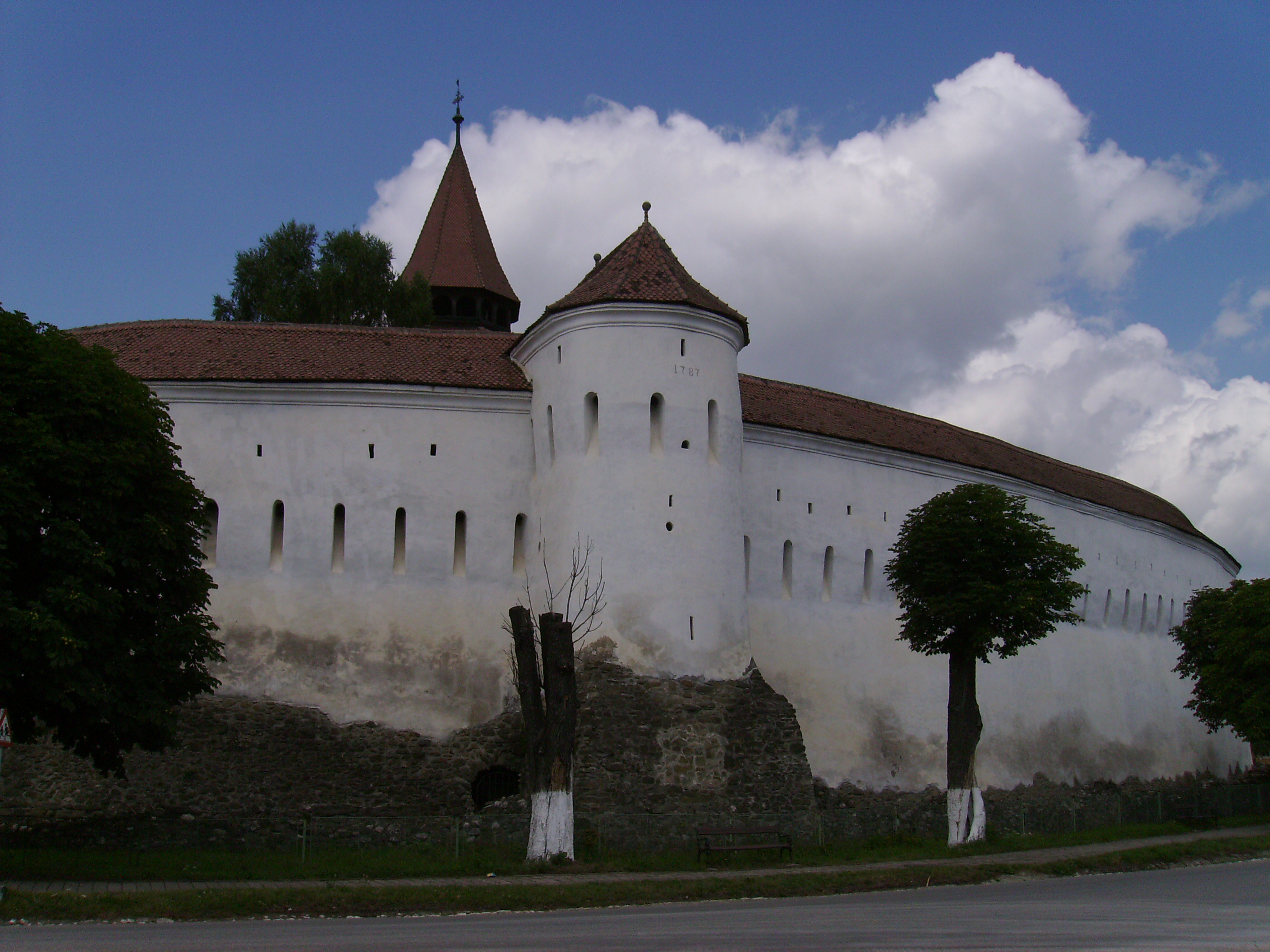
Prejmer fortified church, Romania

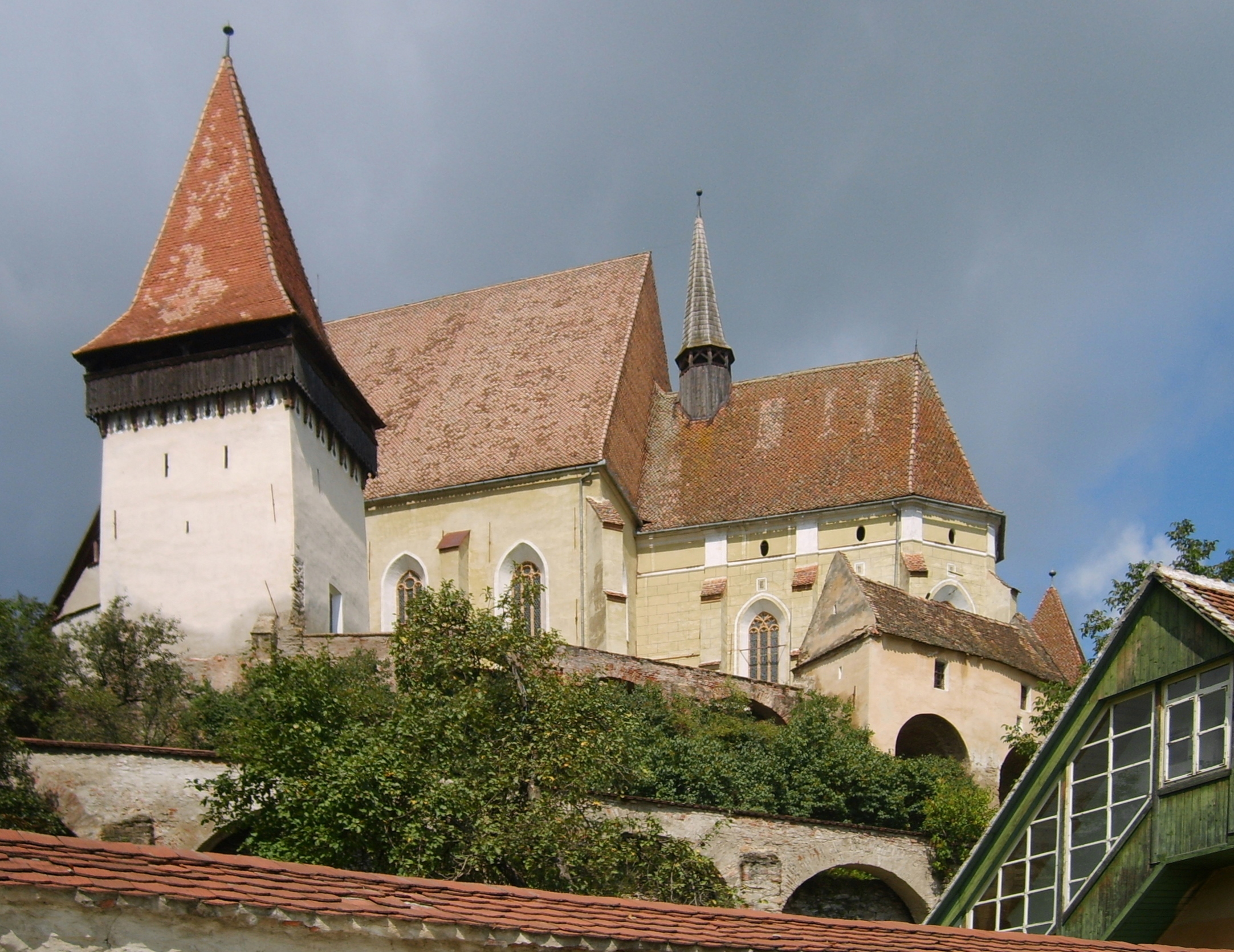
Biertan fortified church, Romania

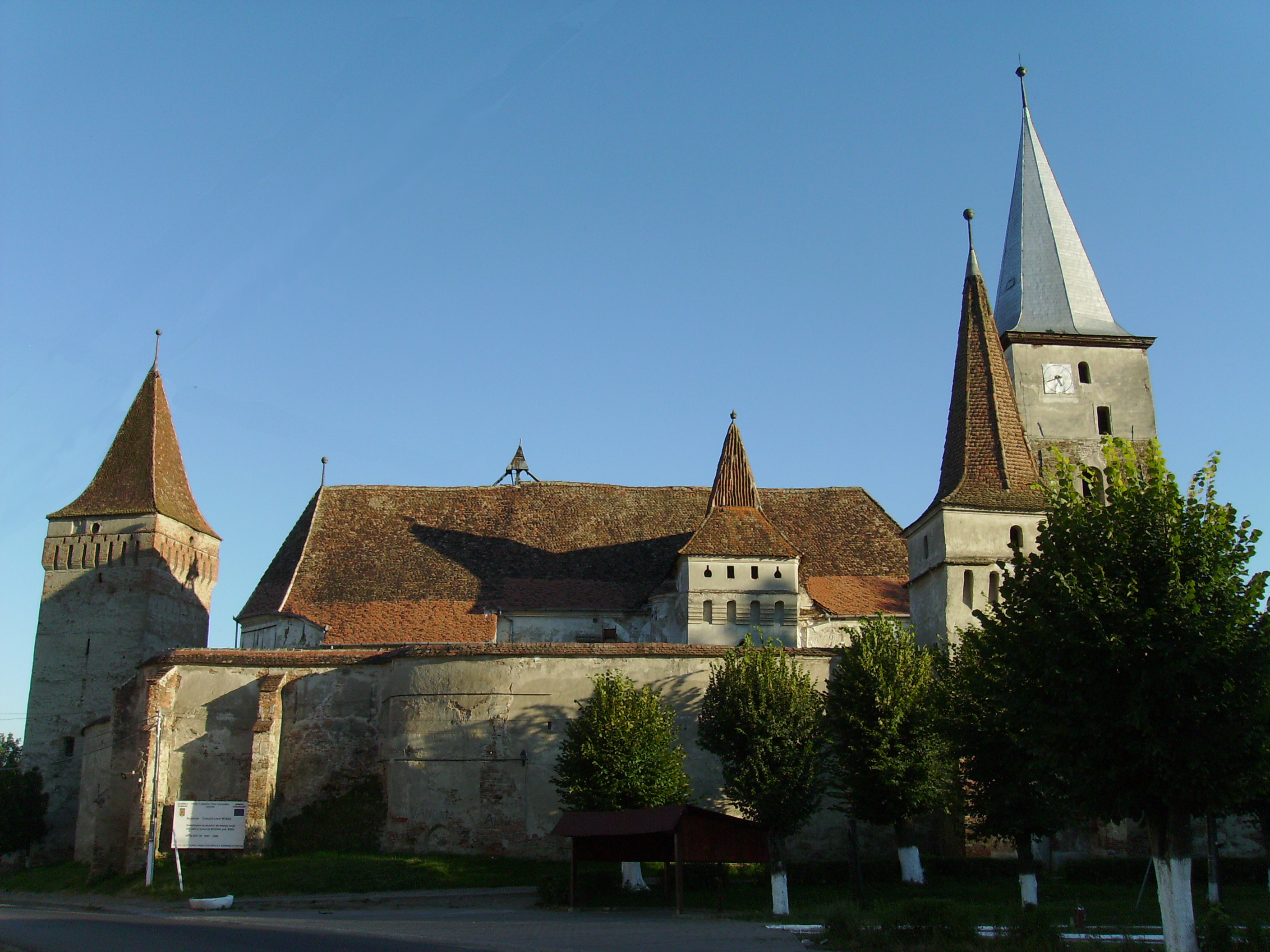
Moşna fortified church, Romania

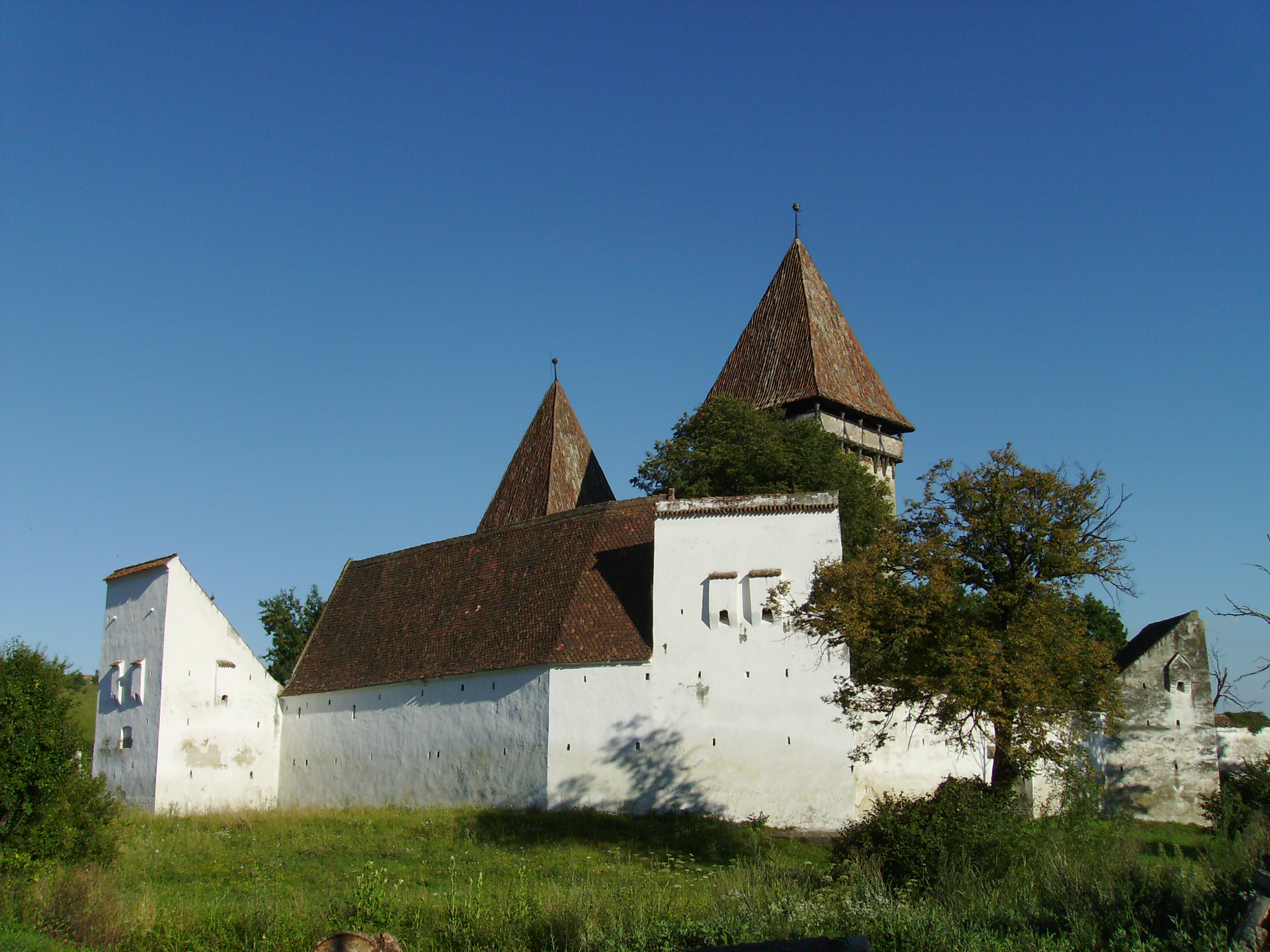
Dealu Frumos fortified church, Romania

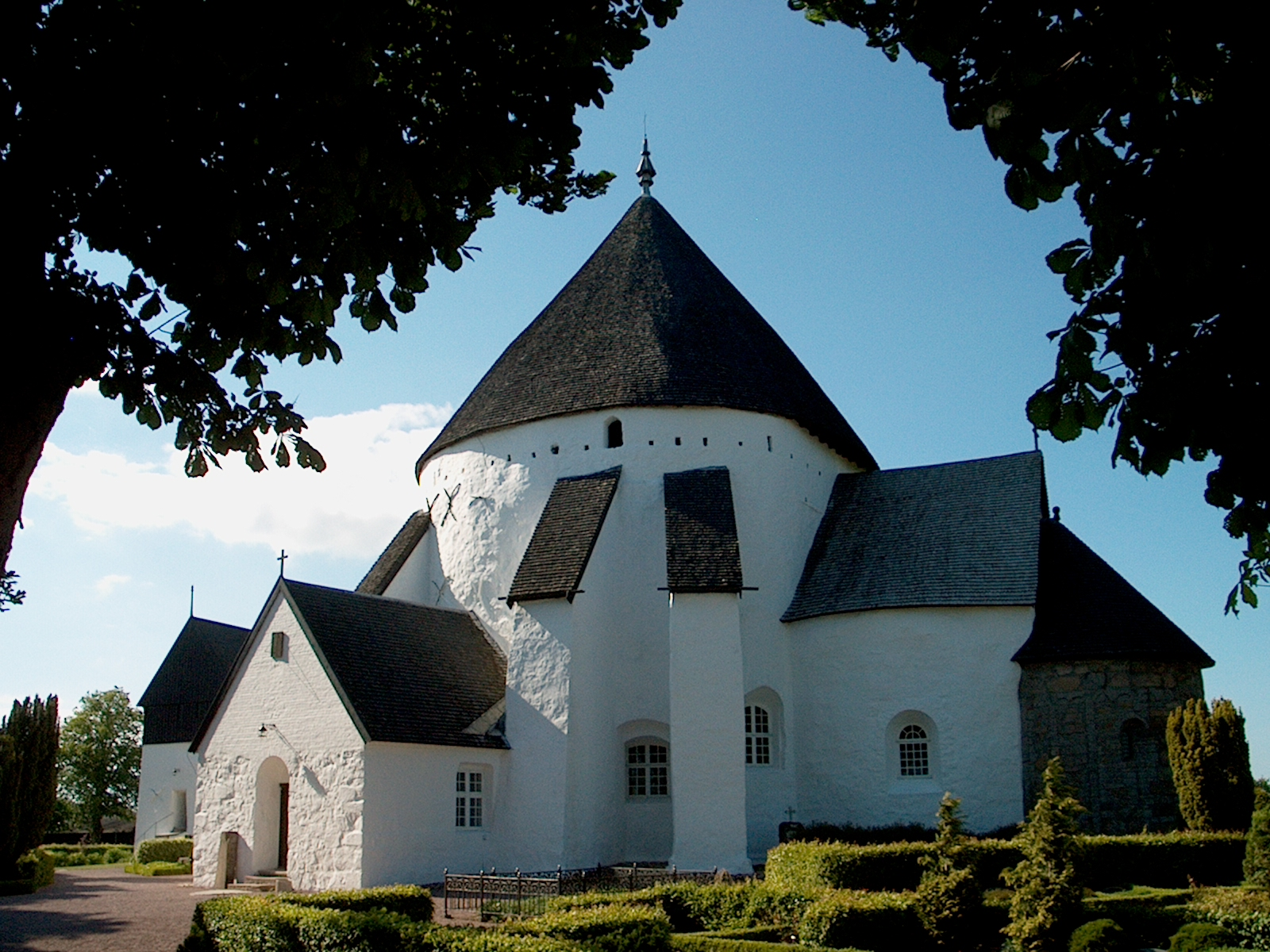
Østerlars Church in Bornholm, Denmark

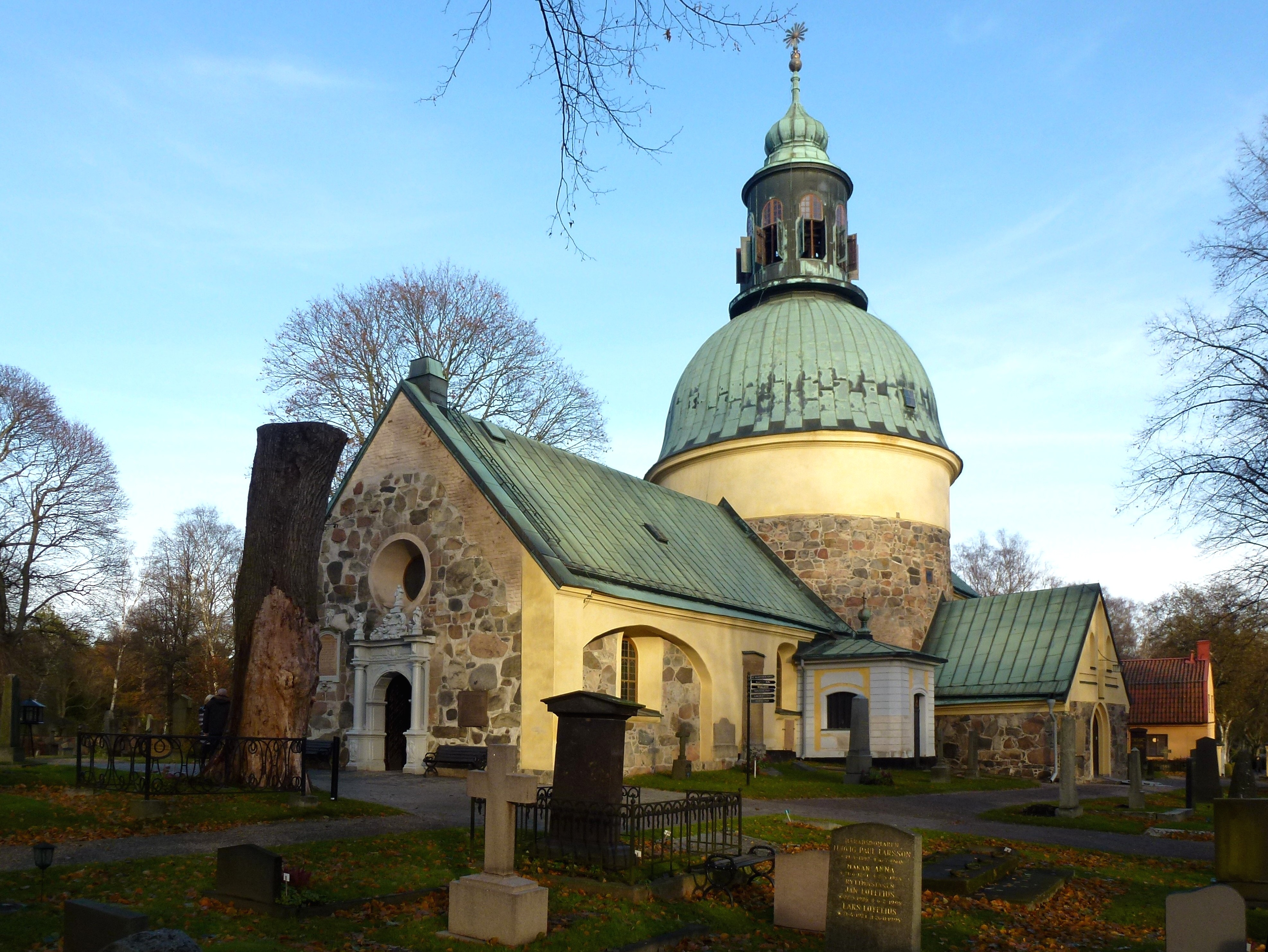
Solna Church close to Stockholm, Sweden

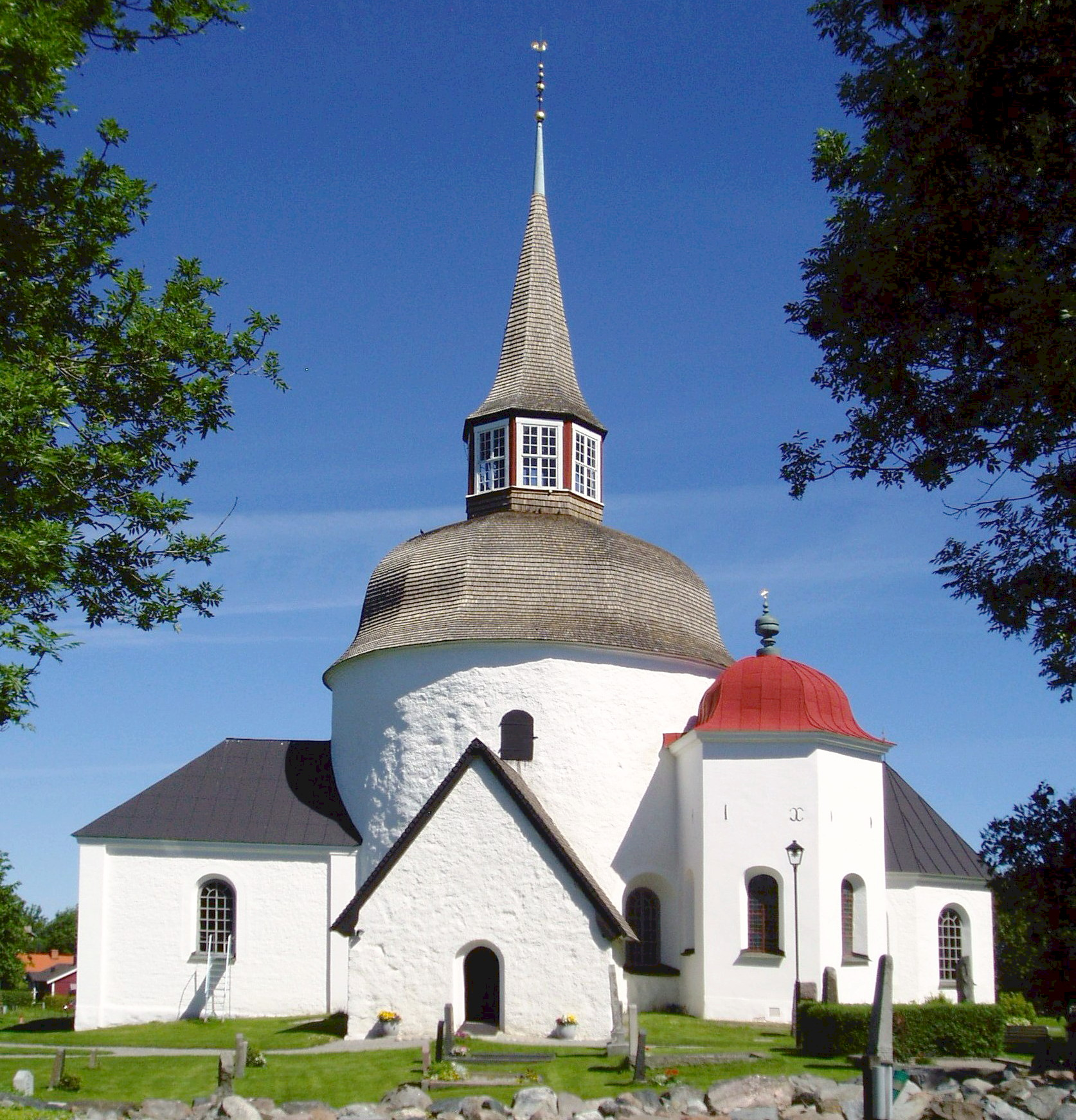
Munsö Church, Sweden

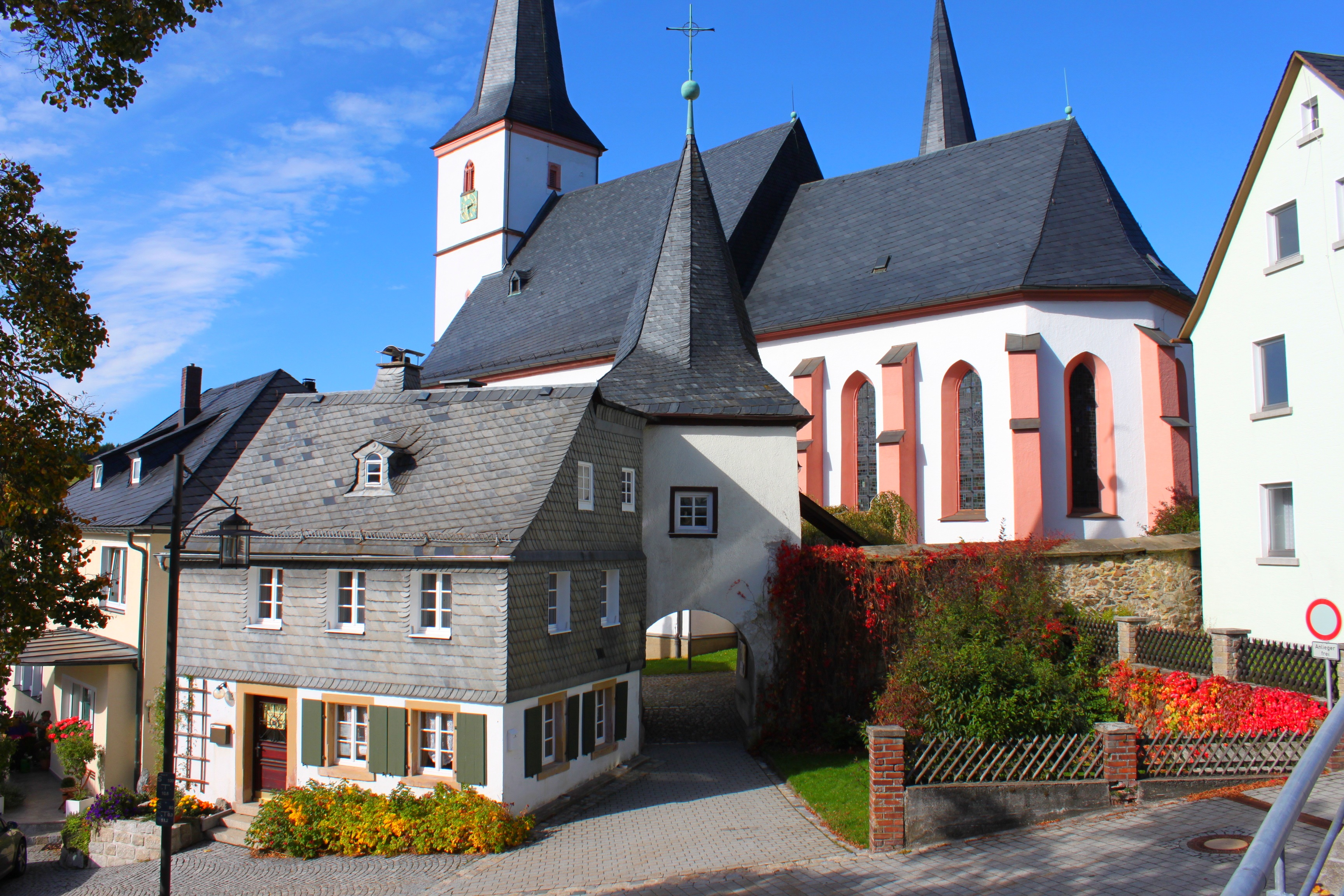
Fortified Church of Grafengehaig, Bavaria

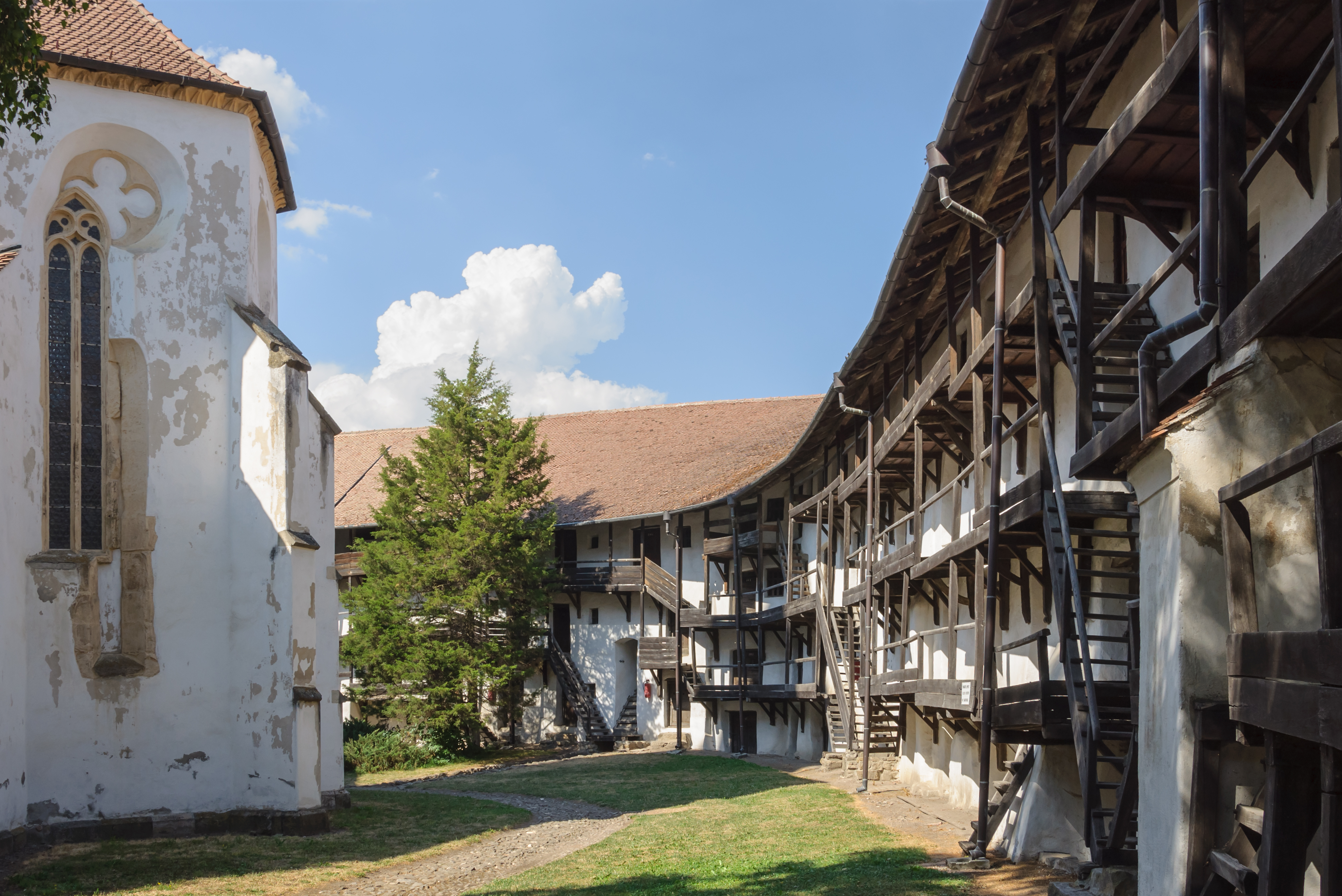
Courtyard of the fortified church of Prejmer, Romania

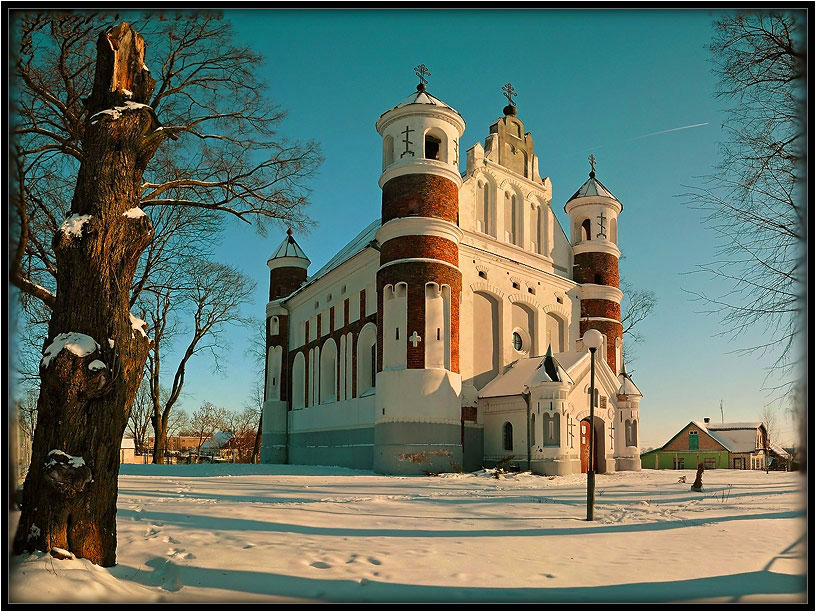
Fortified church in Muravanka, Belarus

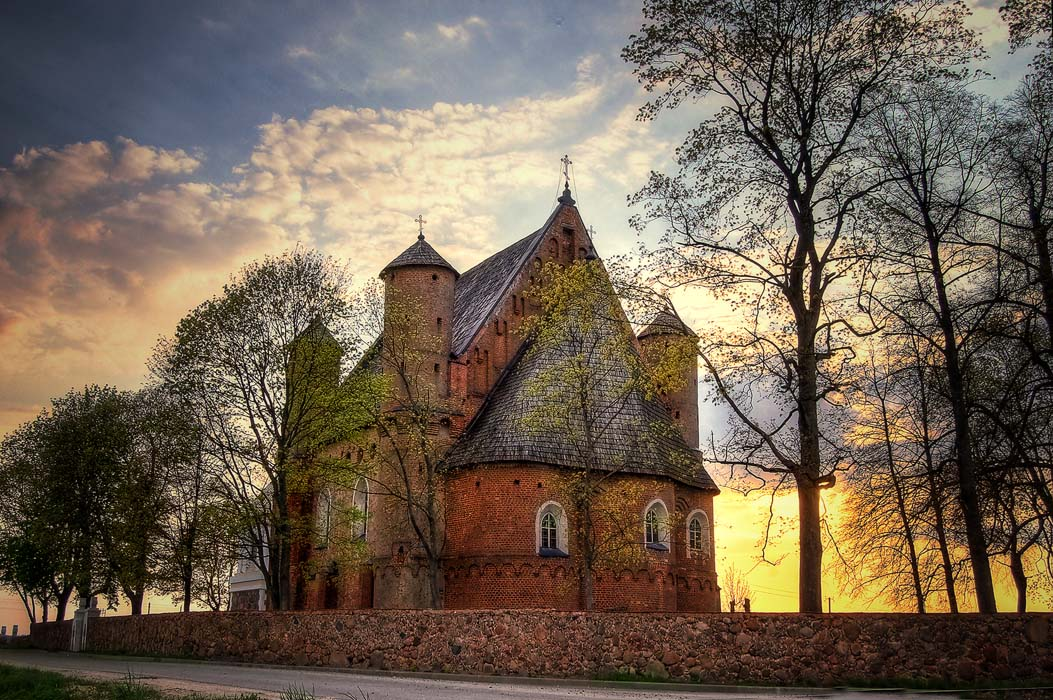
Fortified church in Synkovichi, Belarus

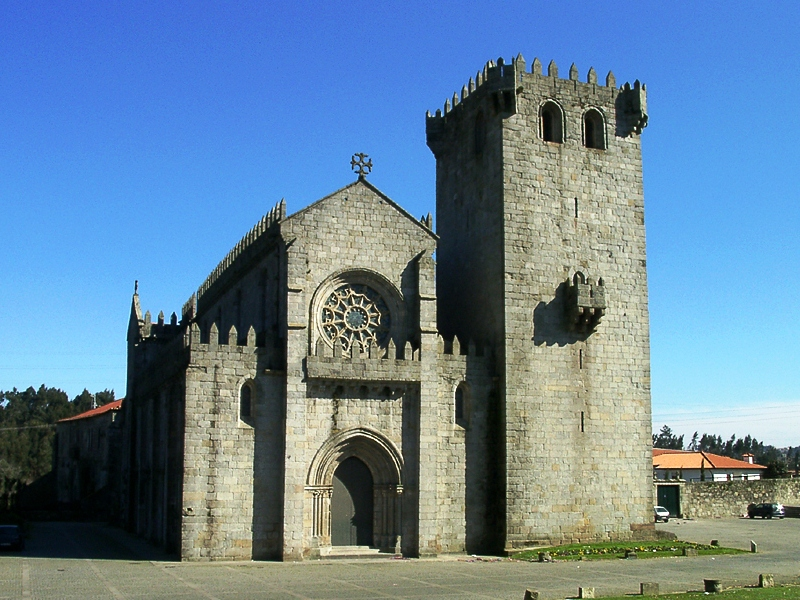
Fortified church of Leça do Balio, Portugal

Fortified Lisbon Cathedral, Portugal

Fortified Old Cathedral of Coimbra, Portugal

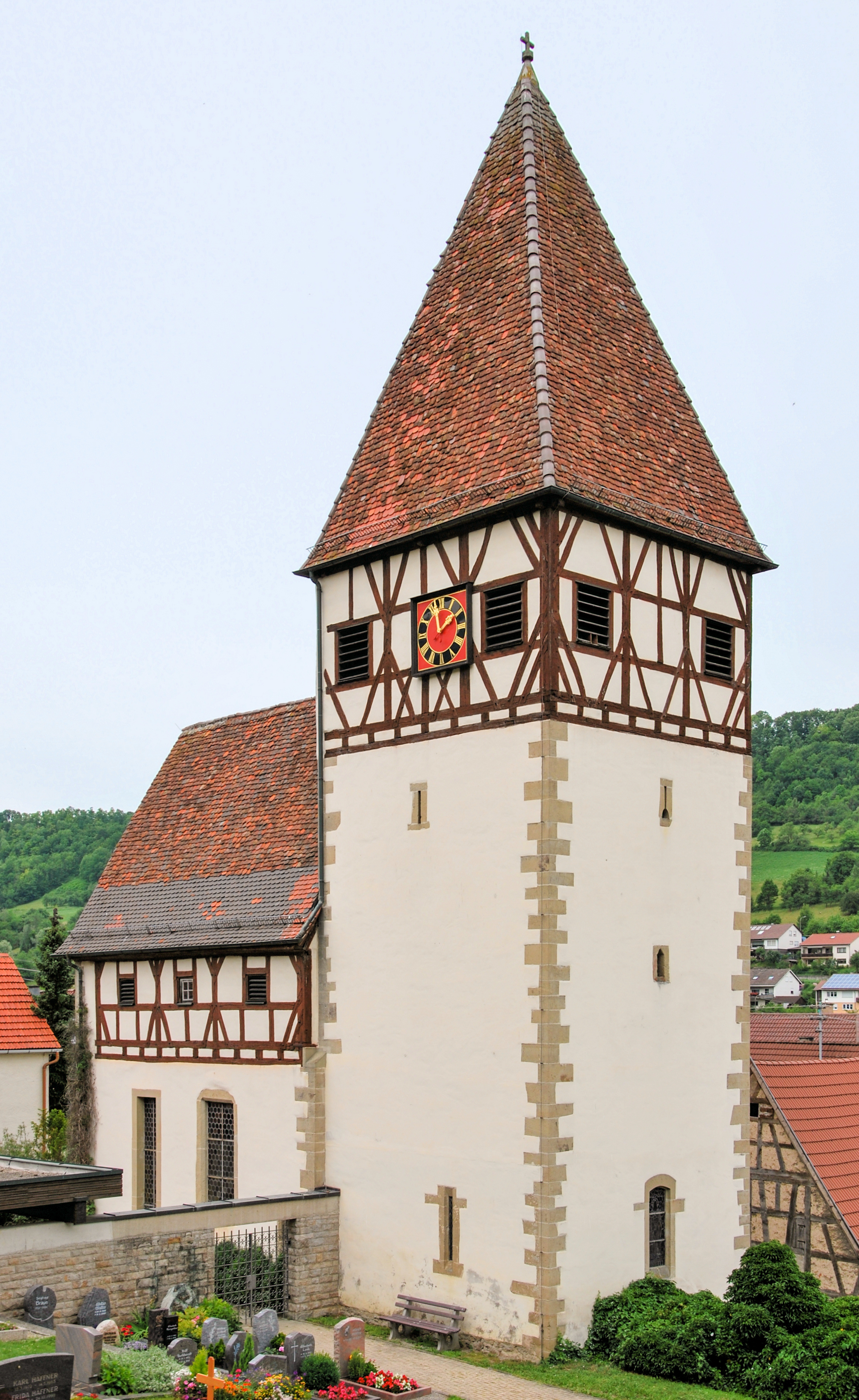
The fortified church of St. Alban and St. Wendelin, Germany

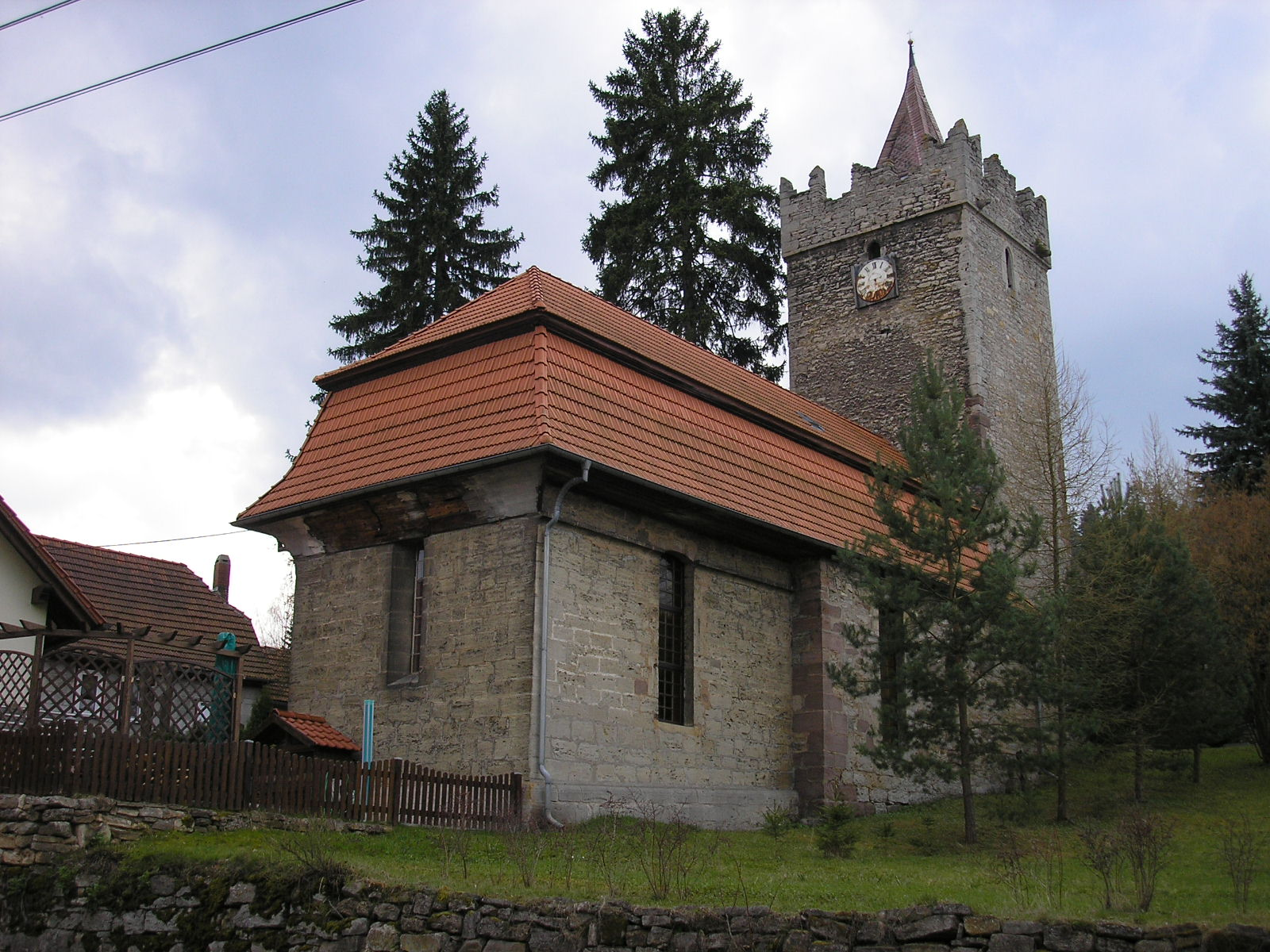
Fortified church in Kleinbreitenbach, Germany

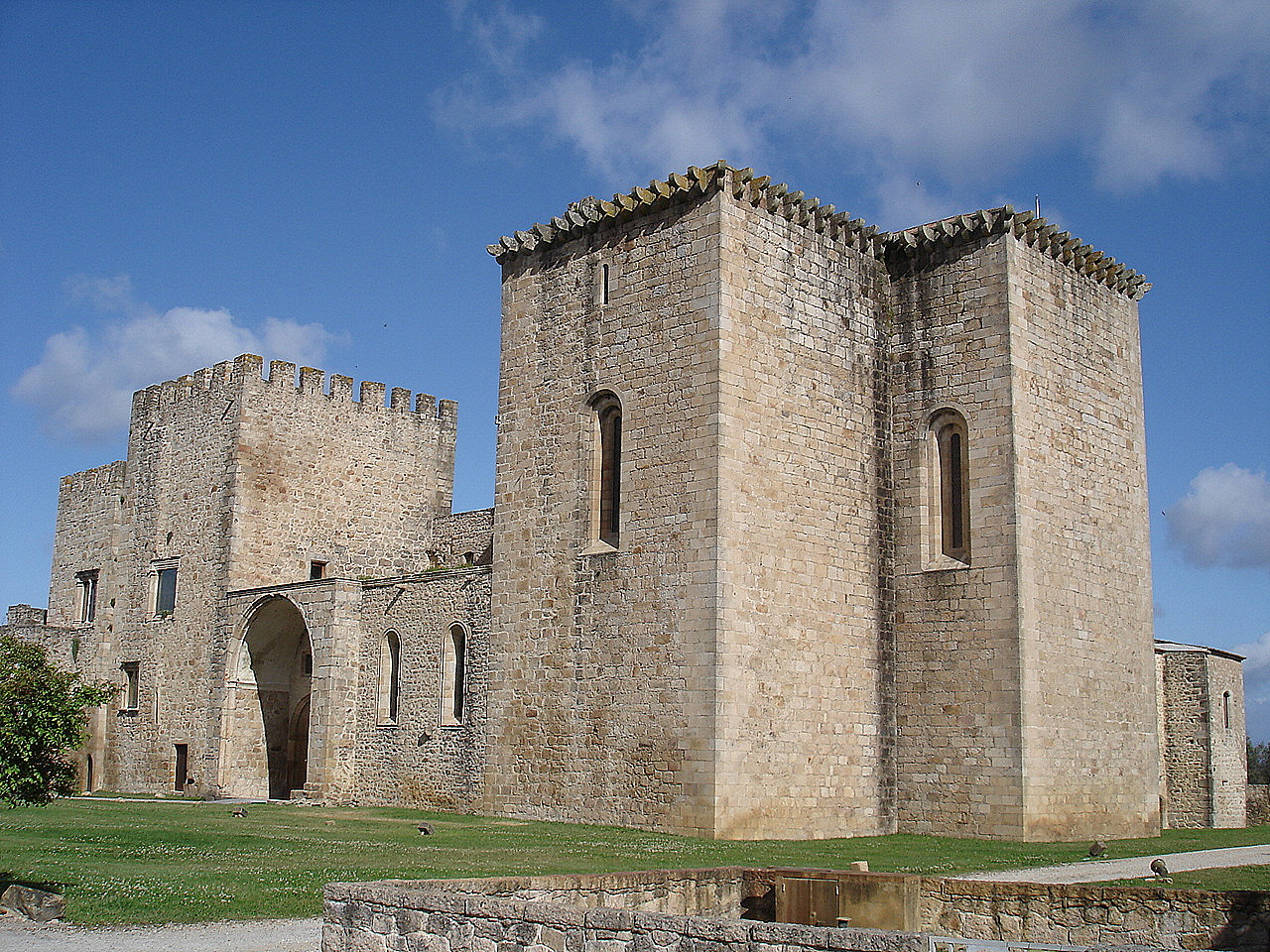
Flor da Rosa fortified church, Portugal

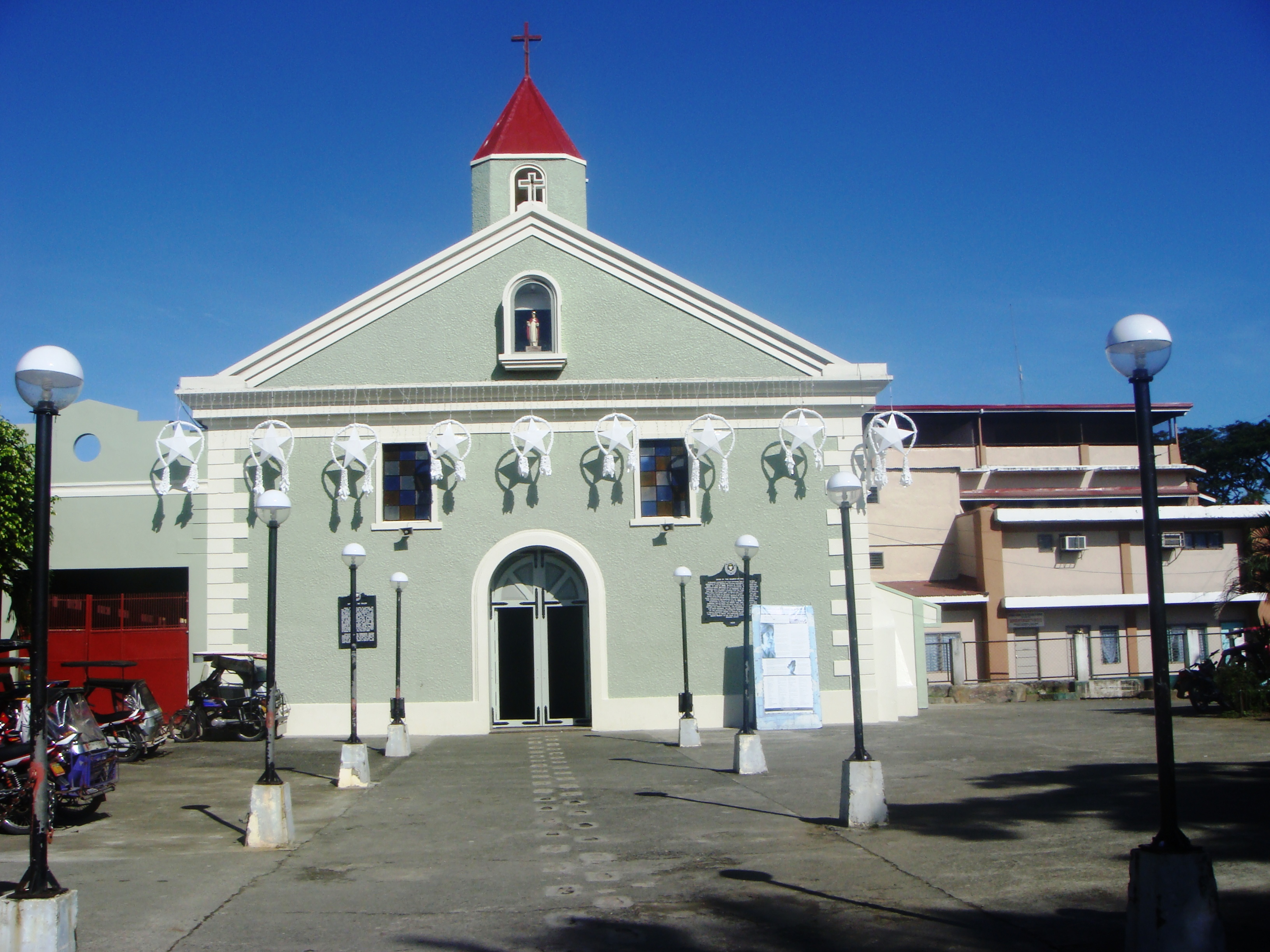
Fortified church of St. Louis in Baler, Philippines.

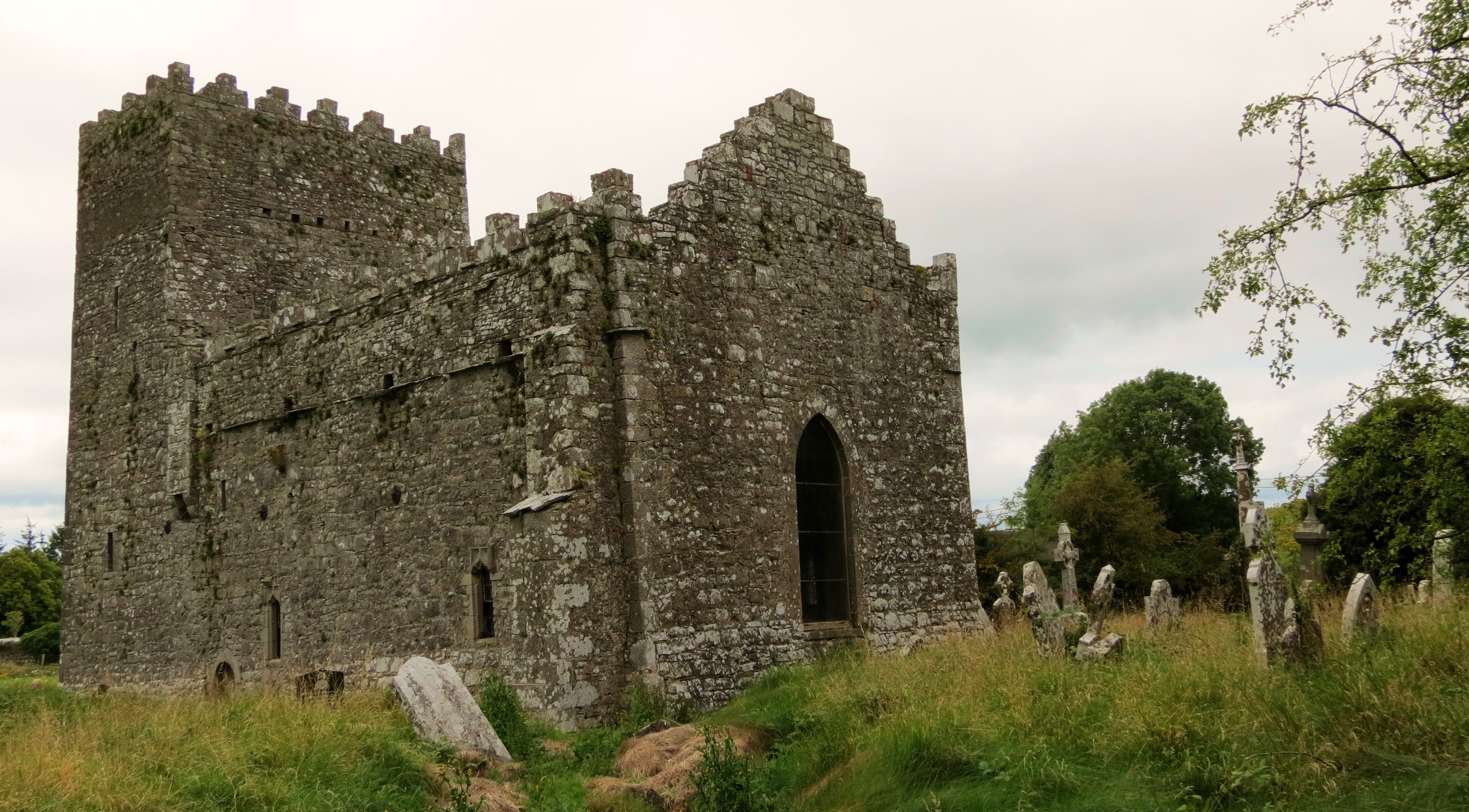
Taghmon Church, Ireland

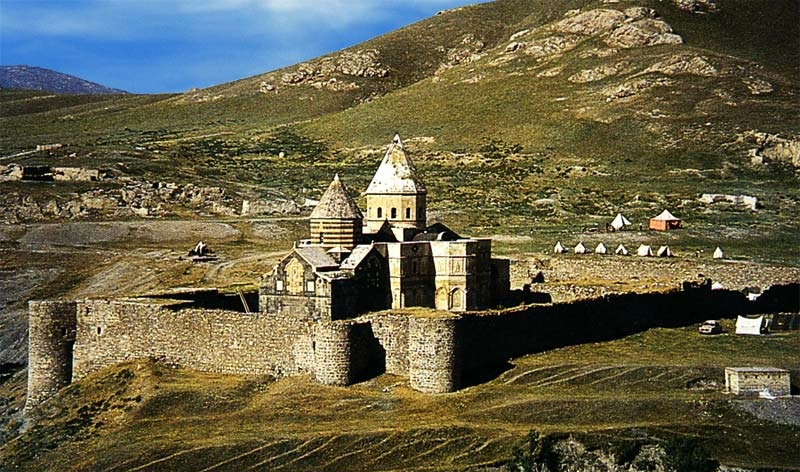
Monastery of Saint Thaddeus, Iran

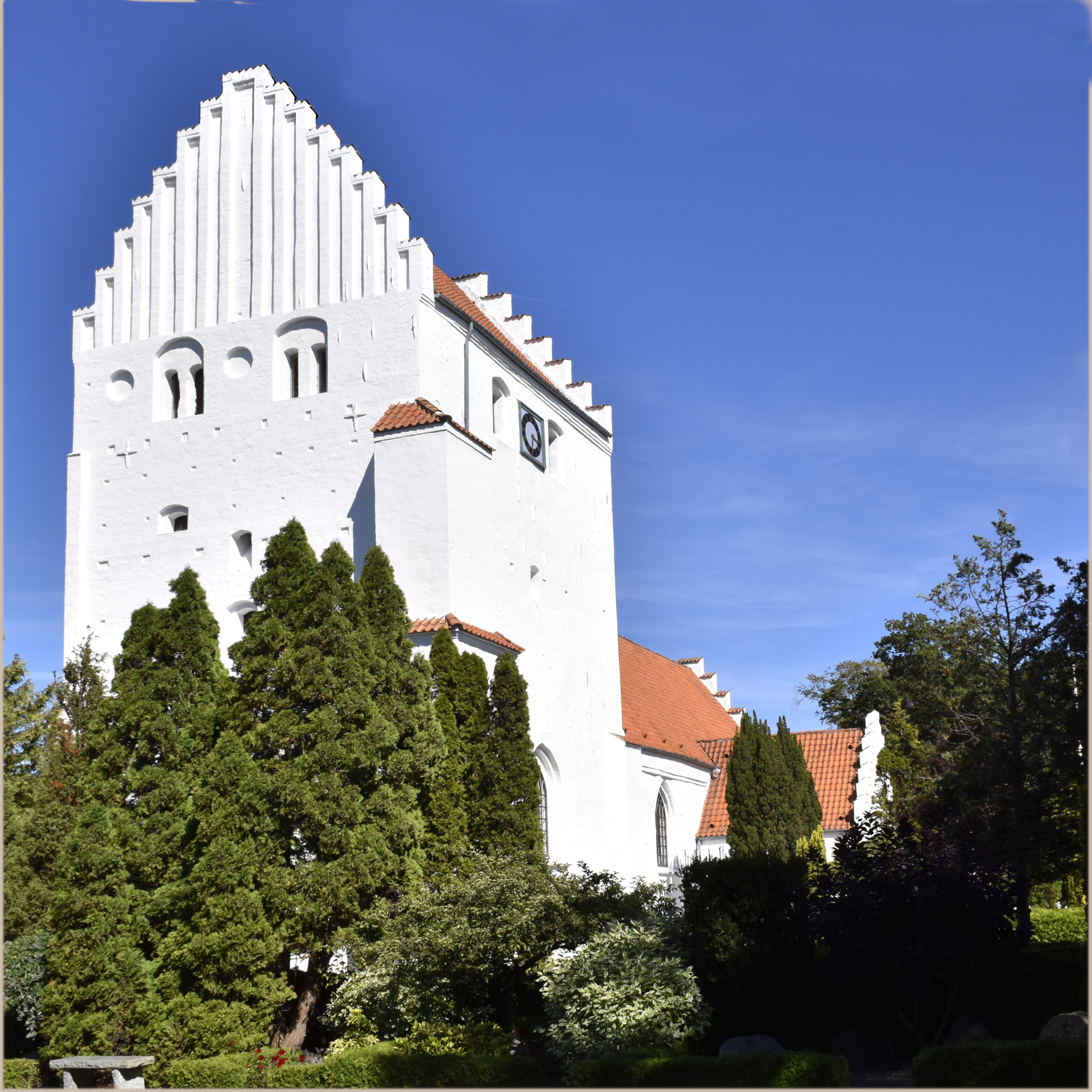
Tranebjerg church, fortified church tower, Denmark

== See also ==
- Saint Catherine's Monastery
- List of fortified churches in Transylvania
- List of Crusader castles
- Ordensburg - (German: "castle of a (military) order"); the castles used by military orders during the Northern Crusades
- Military order (religious society)
  - Knights Templar
  - Knights Hospitaller
  - Teutonic Knights
  - Order of Calatrava
  - Order of Santiago
- Similar concepts in other religions:
  - Judaism:
    - Fortress synagogue – the same concept applied to Jewish synagogues
  - Islam:
    - Ribat or rabad – (Arabic: رِبَـاط); a fortified military base, often also a Sufi lodge and place of Islamic religious education (see also: marabout, qal'a)
    - Dar al-hijra – (Arabic for "place of refuge"); Islamic religious term used by some sects (notably the Assassins of Alamut) to describe their network of fortresses.
  - Buddhism:
    - Dzong
    - Tangyud Monastery
    - Ikkō-ikki
      - Ishiyama Hongan-ji
      - Nagashima
  - Sikhism:
    - Qila Mubarak, Bathinda
    - Qila Mubarak, Patiala
    - Gurdwara Qila Anandgarh Sahib
    - Takht Kesgarh Sahib
