= St Finian's Church, Newcastle =

St Finian's Church of Ireland
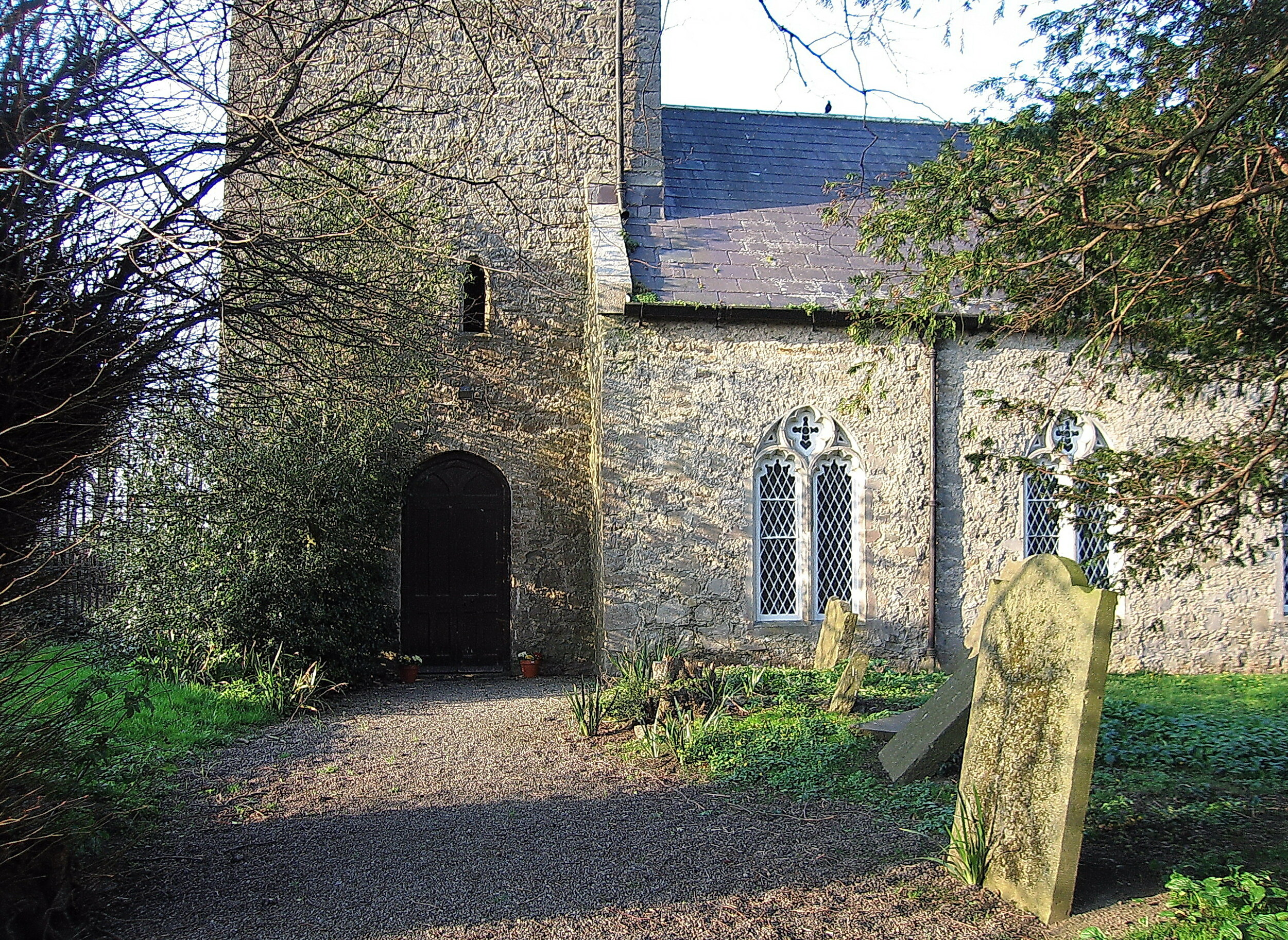
- Church exterior and doorway
- St Finian's Church of Ireland
- 53.3003°N 6.5058°W
- Location: Newcastle, County Dublin
- Country: Ireland
- Denomination: Church of Ireland
- Previous denomination: Roman Catholic

History
- Dedication: St. Finian

Architecture
- Heritage designation: Protected structure

Administration
- Province: Province of Dublin
- Diocese: Diocese of Dublin and Glendalough

St Finian's church is a Church of Ireland building in the village of Newcastle, County Dublin. The core structures of the church, including the west tower and chancel, are dated to the 15th century. These include a residential tower, attached to the church, in which the priest lived. In the late 15th century, an elaborate window was added on the eastern side. Other structures of the church date from redevelopments and expansion works in the late 18th century.

Newcastle, at the edge of the Pale, was frequently attacked by the Irish striking out from the Wicklow Mountains; by the early 15th century there were six fortified tower-houses in Newcastle. The tower in the church is the only one still remaining in a habitable condition.

The Roman Catholic church in Newcastle, also dedicated to Saint Finian, was built in 1813. Both churches, Catholic and Episcopalian, are included on the Record of Protected Structures by South Dublin County Council.
