= 2026 All-Island Cup =

Irish women's football tournament

Tournament details
- Country: Northern Ireland; Republic of Ireland
- Dates: 4 April 2026 – 18 July 2026
- Teams: 16; 12 (Republic of Ireland); 4 (Northern Ireland)

Final positions
- Champions: Shelbourne (1st title)
- Runners-up: Galway United

Tournament statistics
- Matches played: 31
- Goals scored: 113 (3.65 per match)
- Top goal scorer: Becky Watkins (7 goals)

The 2026 All-Island Cup, was the fourth edition of the All-Island Cup, a knockout cup competition featuring clubs from Northern Ireland and the Republic of Ireland. Sixteen teams will compete in the tournament — twelve from the League of Ireland Women's Premier Division, and four from the Women's Premiership.

The draw for the group stage took place on 4 February 2026, at the Northern Ireland Football League headquarters in Belfast. The group stage began on 4 April 2026, the final was played on 18 July 2026.

Wexford were defending champions, having won their first title in the previous edition of the tournament.

Shelbourne won the cup in their home stadium of Tolka Park, winning the cup for the first time in their history defeating Galway United 2–0 in the final.

== Group stage ==
=== Group A ===
Pos	Team	Pld	W	D	L	GF	GA	GD	Pts	Qualification
1	(Republic of Ireland) Shamrock Rovers	3	2	0	1	6	7	−1	6	Advance to knockout stage
2	(Northern Ireland) Linfield	3	1	1	1	7	3	+4	4	Advance to knockout stage
3	(Republic of Ireland) Wexford	3	1	1	1	6	4	+2	4	
4	(Republic of Ireland) Sligo Rovers	3	1	0	2	3	8	−5	3	

Source: Soccerway
4 April 2026
17:00

Sligo Rovers (Republic of Ireland)	2–0	(Republic of Ireland) Wexford
Jordan 10', 71'	Report

The Showgrounds, Sligo
Attendance: 283
Referee: Eric Eaton
5 April 2026
14:00

Linfield (Northern Ireland)	1–2	(Republic of Ireland) Shamrock Rovers
McLaren 88'	Report	48' Corbet; 51' Kinnevey

Midgley Park, Belfast
Attendance: 234
Referee: Adam McKnight

9 May 2026
15:00

Shamrock Rovers (Republic of Ireland)	3–1	(Republic of Ireland) Sligo Rovers
Kelly 4'; Kinnevey 13'; Corbert 90+2'	Report	18' Stephens

Tallaght Stadium, Tallaght
Attendance: 112
Referee: Shane O'Donoghue
9 May 2026
18:00

Wexford (Republic of Ireland)	1–1	(Northern Ireland) Linfield
Bucci 90+2'	Report	59' Chambers

Ferrycarrig Park, Crossabeg
Referee: Ian O'Keeffe

30 May 2026
15:00

Linfield (Northern Ireland)	5–0	(Republic of Ireland) Sligo Rovers
McKnight 28', 75'; Bell 30'; Chambers 56' (pen.); Breen 80'	Report

Midgley Park, Belfast
Referee: Mark Miskimmin
30 May 2026
15:00

Shamrock Rovers (Republic of Ireland)	1–5	(Republic of Ireland) Wexford
Kelly 90+1'	Report	McGrath 33'; Rossiter 42'; Smyth-Lynch 48', 89'; Kirwan 56'

Tallaght Stadium, Tallaght
Attendance: 132
Referee: Paul Farrell

=== Group B ===
Pos	Team	Pld	W	D	L	GF	GA	GD	Pts	Qualification
1	(Republic of Ireland) Galway United	3	3	0	0	10	1	+9	9	Advance to knockout stage
2	(Republic of Ireland) Peamount United	3	2	0	1	11	5	+6	6	Advance to knockout stage
3	(Republic of Ireland) DLR Waves	3	1	0	2	1	7	−6	3	
4	(Northern Ireland) Lisburn Rangers	3	0	0	3	2	11	−9	0	

Source: Soccerway
4 April 2026

DLR Waves (Republic of Ireland)	1–0	(Northern Ireland) Lisburn Rangers
Dodd 34'	Report

UCD Bowl, Dublin
Attendance: 95
Referee: Paudie Hayes
4 April 2026
17:00

Galway United (Republic of Ireland)	4–0	(Republic of Ireland) Peamount United
Bergin 13' (pen.), 44'; Donnelly 38'; Costello 70'	Report

Eamonn Deacy Park, Galway
Attendance: 151
Referee: Shane O'Donoghue

9 May 2026
17:00

Peamount United (Republic of Ireland)	5–0	(Republic of Ireland) DLR Waves
Byrne 4'; Ryan-Doyle 31', 79'; O'Connor 59'; Lawless 83' (o.g.)	Report

Greenogue Park, Dublin
Attendance: 110
Referee: Ruben Collins
10 May 2026
15:00

Lisburn Rangers (Northern Ireland)	1–4	(Republic of Ireland) Galway United
Dickson 7'	Report	Donnelly 2', 13', 59'; Thompson 44'

Crewe Park, Lisburn
Referee: Jack Evans

30 May 2026
17:00

Galway United (Republic of Ireland)	2–0	(Republic of Ireland) DLR Waves
McKey 16'; Donnelly 65'	Report

Maree Oranmore (Note: The game was moved to Maree Oranmore, as a result of works being done at Eamonn Deacy Park), Galway
Attendance: 172
Referee: Shane O'Donoghue
30 May 2026
17:00

Peamount United (Republic of Ireland)	6–1	(Northern Ireland) Lisburn Rangers
Ryan-Doyle 3', 36', 45', 57'; Byrne 26'; Melia 60'	Report	McConaghy 90'

Greenogue Park, Dublin
Referee: Eric Eaton

=== Group C ===
Pos	Team	Pld	W	D	L	GF	GA	GD	Pts	Qualification
1	(Republic of Ireland) Treaty United	3	2	1	0	6	3	+3	7	Advance to knockout stage
2	(Northern Ireland) Cliftonville	3	1	1	1	8	8	0	4	Advance to knockout stage
3	(Republic of Ireland) Athlone Town	3	1	0	2	5	6	−1	3	
4	(Republic of Ireland) Cork City	3	0	2	1	3	5	−2	2	

Source: Soccerway
4 April 2026
15:00

Treaty United (Republic of Ireland)	3–2	(Northern Ireland) Cliftonville
McGuane 50', 79'; Breslin 84'	Report	82' Devine; 86' Kelly

The Paddocks, Ballingarry
Attendance: 179
Referee: Chris Sheehan
4 April 2026
18:00

Athlone Town (Republic of Ireland)	2–0	(Republic of Ireland) Cork City
O'Kane 14'; Gibson 50'	Report

Athlone Town Stadium, Athlone
Attendance: 265
Referee: Paul Farrell

9 May 2026
15:00

Cork City (Republic of Ireland)	0–0	(Republic of Ireland) Treaty United
	Report

Munster FA Turner’s Cross Stadium, Cork
Attendance: 104
Referee: Paudie Hayes
10 May 2026
14:00

Cliftonville (Northern Ireland)	3–2	(Republic of Ireland) Athlone Town
Maxwell 23'; Lynch 63'; McGuinness 69'	Report	Molloy 28'; Murray 69'

Solitude, Belfast
Referee: Simon Bickerstaff

30 May 2026
14:00

Treaty United (Republic of Ireland)	3–1	(Republic of Ireland) Athlone Town
Goggin 7'; Coady 26'; Lawlee 66'	Report	Gibson 60'

Markets Field, Limerick
Attendance: 223
Referee: Paudie Hayes
30 May 2026
14:00

Cliftonville (Northern Ireland)	3–3	(Republic of Ireland) Cork City
Carleton 37'; Berrows 73'; Lynch 90+7'	Report	Berezowski 2', 12'; Mackin 33'

Solitude, Belfast

=== Group D ===
Pos	Team	Pld	W	D	L	GF	GA	GD	Pts	Qualification
1	(Republic of Ireland) Shelbourne	3	3	0	0	12	4	+8	9	Advance to knockout stage
2	(Republic of Ireland) Bohemians	3	1	0	2	7	5	+2	3	Advance to knockout stage
3	(Northern Ireland) Glentoran	3	1	0	2	4	8	−4	3	
4	(Republic of Ireland) Waterford	3	1	0	2	3	9	−6	3	

Source: Soccerway
4 April 2026
15:00

Bohemians (Republic of Ireland)	1–3	(Northern Ireland) Glentoran
McEvoy 86'	Report	15' Kerr; 76' Vance; 84' Rogan

Dalymount Park, Dublin
Attendance: 506
Referee: Ruben Collins
4 April 2026
15:00

Waterford (Republic of Ireland)	2–4	(Republic of Ireland) Shelbourne
Walsh 39'; Mahony 76'	Report	51', 53' Wollmer; 57' Doyle; 65' Graham

RSC, Waterford
Attendance: 288
Referee: Ian O'Keeffe

9 May 2026
16:00

Shelbourne (Republic of Ireland)	2–1	(Republic of Ireland) Bohemians
Watkins 10'; Clancy 26'	Report	Kane 40'

Tolka Park, Dublin
Attendance: 406
Referee: Paul Farrell
10 May 2026
17:00

Glentoran (Northern Ireland)	0–1	(Republic of Ireland) Waterford
	Report	Burke 16'

Blanchflower Park Stadium, Belfast
Referee: Mark Miskimmin

30 May 2026
17:00

Bohemians (Republic of Ireland)	5–0	(Republic of Ireland) Waterford
Kane 33'; Brennan 36'; Murphy 39'; Power 45'; Fennell 53'	Report

Dalymount Park, Dublin
Referee: Sam Ralph
30 May 2026
17:00

Glentoran (Northern Ireland)	1–6	(Republic of Ireland) Shelbourne
Conway 3'	Report	Watkins 2', 80'; Kavanagh 17'; Harcourt 36', 62'; Doyle 68'

Blanchflower Park Stadium, Belfast
Referee: Louise Thompson

== Knockout stage ==
=== Bracket ===
Quarter-finals
13 June
(Republic of Ireland) Shelbourne	3
(Northern Ireland) Cliftonville	1
13 June
(Republic of Ireland) Treaty United	0
(Republic of Ireland) Bohemians	1
13 June
(Republic of Ireland) Galway United	3
(Northern Ireland) Linfield	2
13 June
(Republic of Ireland) Shamrock Rovers	0
(Republic of Ireland) Peamount United	1

Semi-finals
27 June
(Republic of Ireland) Shelbourne	4
(Republic of Ireland) Bohemians	0
27 June
(Republic of Ireland) Galway United	1(5)
(Republic of Ireland) Peamount United	1(3)

Final
18 July
(Republic of Ireland) Shelbourne	2
(Republic of Ireland) Galway United	0

=== Quarter-finals ===
13 June 2026
16:00

Shelbourne (Republic of Ireland)	3–1	(Northern Ireland) Cliftonville
Clancy 17' (pen.), 37'; Watkins 86'	Report	Kelly 47'

Tolka Park, Dublin
Attendance: 297
Referee: Ryan Maher

13 June 2026
15:00

Treaty United (Republic of Ireland)	0–1	(Republic of Ireland) Bohemians
McGuane (penalty missed) 40'	Report	Kane 76'

Markets Field, Limerick
Attendance: 253
Referee: Ian O'Keeffe

13 June 2026
17:00

Galway United (Republic of Ireland)	3–2	(Northern Ireland) Linfield
Beletic 50'; McGough 80'; Doherty 90+1'	Report	Bell 36'; Sweetlove (red card) 81'; Chambers 84'

Moyne Villa, Galway
Attendance: 142
Referee: Mark Patchell

13 June 2026
15:00

Shamrock Rovers (Republic of Ireland)	0–1	(Republic of Ireland) Peamount United
	Report	O'Neill 54'

Greenogue Park, Dublin
Attendance: 236
Referee: Darragh White

=== Semi-finals ===
27 June 2026
13:00

Shelbourne (Republic of Ireland)	4–0	(Republic of Ireland) Bohemians
Gargan 20'; Watkins 50', 58'; Harcourt 90+3'	Report

Tolka Park, Dublin
Attendance: 527
Referee: Glen Geraghty

27 June 2026
17:00

Galway United (Republic of Ireland)	1–1	(Republic of Ireland) Peamount United
McGough 90+2'		Melia 38'
Penalties
McQuillan (penalty scored); Thompson (penalty scored); Doherty (penalty scored); Grant (penalty scored); Farrelly (penalty scored)	5–3	(penalty scored) Healy; (penalty missed) Byrne; (penalty scored) Spillane; (penalty scored) O'Connor

Moyne Villa, Galway
Attendance: 81
Referee: Ryan Maher

=== Final ===
18 July 2026
19:35 IST

Shelbourne (Republic of Ireland)	2–0	(Republic of Ireland) Galway United
Watkins 53'; Slattery 76'	Report	McQuillan (red card) 77'

Tolka Park, Dublin
Attendance: 1,368
Referee: Glen Geraghty

Final was broadcast on TG4

== Top goalscorers ==
Rank	Player	Club	Goals
1	(Republic of Ireland) Becky Watkins	(Republic of Ireland) Shelbourne	7
2	(Republic of Ireland) Eleanor Ryan-Doyle	(Republic of Ireland) Peamount United	6
3	(Republic of Ireland) Aoibheann Donnelly	(Republic of Ireland) Galway United	5
4	(Republic of Ireland) Aoibheann Clancy	(Republic of Ireland) Shelbourne	3
4	(Northern Ireland) Cora Chambers	(Northern Ireland) Linfield	3
4	(Republic of Ireland) Halle Harcourt	(Republic of Ireland) Shelbourne	3
4	(Republic of Ireland) Savannah Kane	(Republic of Ireland) Bohemians	3
5	18 players	Various	2

== See also ==
- 2026 League of Ireland Women's Premier Division
- 2026 Women's Premiership
