= 2025 All-Island Cup final =

- Event: 2025 All-Island Cup
Bohemians	Wexford
(Republic of Ireland)	(Republic of Ireland)
1	1
- After extra time Wexford won 5–3 on penalties
- Date: 31 August 2025
- Venue: Ferrycarrig Park, Wexford
- Referee: Rob Dowling
- Attendance: 2,201

The 2025 All-Island Cup final, known as the Avenir All-Island Cup final for sponsorship reasons, was the final match of the 2025 All-Island Cup, a knock-out women's association football competition contested annually by clubs affiliated with the Football Association of Ireland and the Irish Football Association. It took place on 31 August 2025 at Ferrycarrig Park in Wexford, and was contested by Wexford and Bohemians. Wexford won the match 5–3 on penalties following a 1–1 draw after extra time to win the cup for the first time.

== Background ==
On 22 March, both sides met in the league which ended in a 1–0 victory for Bohemians at Dalymount Park. Later on 28 June, the two sides played at Ferrycarrig Park, where Bohs' would knock Wexford out of the FAI Women's Cup.

In the 2023 and 2024 editions of the tournament Wexford would be eliminated by Galway United in the semi-finals, the two sides would meet again in the same round in the 2025 edition with Wexford finally coming out on top with a 1–0 win at Eamonn Deacy Park.

=== Route to the final ===
Note: In all results below, the score of the finalist is given first (H: home; A: away).

Wexford		Round	Bohemians	
Opponent	Result	Group stage	Opponent	Result
Lisburn Rangers	5–0 (A)	Matchday 1	Sligo Rovers	1–1 (A)
Shamrock Rovers	1–2 (H)	Matchday 2	Shelbourne	1–1 (H)
DLR Waves	2–0 (A)	Matchday 3	Linfield	2–1 (H)
Group B: Pos / Team / Pld / Pts; 1 / (Republic of Ireland) Wexford / 3 / 6; 2 / (Republic of Ireland) Shamrock Rovers / 3 / 6; 3 / (Northern Ireland) Lisburn Rangers / 3 / 6; 4 / (Republic of Ireland) DLR Waves / 3 / 0; Source: Soccerway		Final standings	Group A: Pos / Team / Pld / Pts; 1 / (Republic of Ireland) Shelbourne / 3 / 7; 2 / (Republic of Ireland) Bohemians / 3 / 5; 3 / (Republic of Ireland) Sligo Rovers / 3 / 2; 4 / (Northern Ireland) Linfield / 3 / 1; Source: Soccerway	
Opponent	Result	Knockout stage	Opponent	Result
Peamount United	1–0 (H)	Quarter-final	Glentoran	3–1 (A)
Galway United	1–0 (A)	Semi-final	Shelbourne	2–2 (6–5 p) (H)

== Match ==
=== Details ===
31 August 2025
16:35 IST

Wexford (Republic of Ireland)	1–1 (a.e.t.)	(Republic of Ireland) Bohemians
Molloy 66'	Report	McEvoy 33'
Penalties
Molloy (penalty scored); Kelly (penalty scored); De Mange (penalty scored); Cromack (penalty scored); Cassin (penalty scored)	5–3	(penalty scored) McGovern; (penalty scored) McEvoy; (penalty missed) Kane; (penalty scored) Donnelly

Ferrycarrig Park, Wexford
Attendance: 2,201
Referee: Rob Dowling

Wexford	Bohemians

GK	23	(Republic of Ireland) Maria O'Sullivan
DF	3	(Republic of Ireland) Orlaith Conlon	(substituted off) 57'
DF	4	(Republic of Ireland) Della Doherty
DF	5	(Republic of Ireland) Lauren Dwyer
DF	22	(United States) Anna Doane
MF	6	(Republic of Ireland) Kylie Murphy (c)	(substituted off) 57'
MF	7	(Republic of Ireland) Becky Cassin
MF	8	(Republic of Ireland) Aoife Kelly
MF	12	(Republic of Ireland) Ciara Rossiter
MF	20	(Republic of Ireland) Freya DeMange
FW	10	(Republic of Ireland) Ellen Molloy
Substitutes:
GK	21	(Republic of Ireland) Claudia Keenan
DF	37	(Republic of Ireland) Niamh Tyrrell
MF	14	(Republic of Ireland) Meabh Russell	(substituted on) 57'
MF	15	(Republic of Ireland) Michaela Lawrence
MF	26	(Republic of Ireland) Charlotte Cromack	(substituted on) 57'
MF	35	(Republic of Ireland) Molly Kirwan
FW	9	(Republic of Ireland) Leah McGrath
FW	11	(Republic of Ireland) Lauren Kelly
FW	17	(Republic of Ireland) Millie Daly
Manager:
(Republic of Ireland) Seán Byrne

GK	1	(Republic of Ireland) Rachael Kelly (c)
DF	4	(Republic of Ireland) Lisa Murphy
DF	5	(Republic of Ireland) Roisin McGovern
DF	12	(Republic of Ireland) Sarah Power	(substituted off) 90+3'
DF	17	(Republic of Ireland) Katie Lovely	(substituted off) 68'
MF	6	(Republic of Ireland) Fiona Donnelly
MF	7	(Republic of Ireland) Aoibhe Brennan
MF	8	(Republic of Ireland) Hannah Healy	(substituted off) 85'
MF	11	(Republic of Ireland) Sarah McKevitt
FW	9	(Republic of Ireland) Alannah McEvoy
FW	29	(Republic of Ireland) Hannah O’Brien	(substituted off) 68'
Substitutes:
GK	32	(Republic of Ireland) Jenna Willoughby
DF	21	(Republic of Ireland) Robin Baird
DF	27	(Republic of Ireland) Alex Devoy
MF	10	(Republic of Ireland) Katie Malone	(substituted on) 85'
MF	22	(United States) Lillian Rusher	(substituted on) 90+3'
MF	23	(Republic of Ireland) Emma Gaughran	(substituted on) 68'
MF	25	(Republic of Ireland) Leiagh Glennon	(substituted on) 68'	(substituted off) 85'
FW	16	(Republic of Ireland) Savannah Kane	(substituted on) 85'
FW	30	(Bulgaria) Michelle Muddiman
Manager:
(Albania) Alban Hysa
