= 2026 League of Ireland Women's Premier Division =

Irish women's football league season

Premier Division
- Season: 2026
- Dates: 14 March – 24 October 2026
- Champions: Athlone Town
- Champions League: Athlone Town
- Europa Cup: Shelbourne
- Matches: 113
- Goals: 313 (2.77 per match)
- Top goalscorer: Dana Scheriff (16 goals)
- Biggest home win: Cork City 6–0 Peamount United (23 May 2026)
- Biggest away win: Sligo Rovers 0–5 Shamrock Rovers (28 March 2026)
- Highest scoring: Waterford 3–5 Peamount United (16 May 2026)
- Longest winning run: 9 matches Athlone Town
- Longest unbeaten run: 11 matches Galway United
- Longest winless run: 10 matches Cork City
- Longest losing run: 7 matches Cork City
- All statistics correct as of 19 July 2026.

The 2026 Premier Division, also known as SSE Airtricity Women's Premier Division for sponsorship reasons, was the fourth edition of the top-tier women's football league in the Republic of Ireland since its restructure in 2022.

Athlone Town came in to the season as defending champions, having won their second title in the 2025 season. They successfully defended their title, winning the league for the third year in a row.

The first matches of the 2026 season were played on 14 March 2026. The final matchday were scheduled to be played on 24 October 2026. However two games took place on 25 October due to a storm.

== Teams ==
Twelve clubs are participating in the 2026 season.

Locations of Women's Premier Division teams
Locations of Dublin Women's Premier Division teams

=== Stadiums and locations ===
Club	Town / City	Stadium	Capacity
Athlone Town	Athlone	Athlone Town Stadium	5,000
Bohemians	Dublin (Phibsborough)	Dalymount Park	4,500
Cork City	Cork	Munster FA Turners Cross Stadium	7,485
DLR Waves	Dublin (Dún Laoghaire)	UCD Bowl	3,000
Galway United	Galway	Eamonn Deacy Park	5,000
Peamount United	Dublin (Newcastle)	Greenogue	N/A
Shamrock Rovers	Dublin (Tallaght)	Tallaght Stadium	10,500
Shelbourne	Dublin (Drumcondra)	Tolka Park	5,750
Sligo Rovers	Sligo	The Showgrounds	3,873
Treaty United	Limerick	Markets Field	4,500
Waterford	Waterford	RSC	5,160
Wexford	Crossabeg	Ferrycarrig Park	2,500

=== Personnel and kits ===
Team	Manager	Captain	Kit manufacturer	Shirt sponsor
Athlone Town	(Republic of Ireland) Lily Agg	(United States) Hannah Waesch	Macron	Redrock Machinery
Bohemians	(Republic of Ireland) Alan Murphy	(Republic of Ireland) Rachael Kelly	O'Neills	Virgin Media
Cork City	(Republic of Ireland) Derek Coughlan	(Republic of Ireland) Eva Mangan	Rebel Army	Zeus Packaging
DLR Waves	(Republic of Ireland) Laura Heffernan	(Republic of Ireland) Jessica Gleeson	Balon Direct	Dún Laoghaire–Rathdown County Council
Galway United	(Republic of Ireland) Phil Trill	(Republic of Ireland) Lynsey McKey	O'Neills	Comer Property Management
Peamount United	(Albania) Alban Hysa	(Republic of Ireland) Eleanor Ryan-Doyle	Uhlsport	IP Telecom
Shamrock Rovers	(Republic of Ireland) James O'Callaghan	Multiple	Macron	Blake Brothers Food Service
Shelbourne	(Republic of Ireland) Seán Russell	(Republic of Ireland) Pearl Slattery	O'Neills	Chadwicks
Sligo Rovers	(Republic of Ireland) Gavin Hughes	(Republic of Ireland) Emma Hansberry	Umbro	Avant Money
Treaty United	(Republic of Ireland) Laurie Ryan	(Republic of Ireland) Katie Lawlee	O'Neills	Dawn International
Waterford	(Republic of Ireland) Gary Hunt	(Republic of Ireland) Maeve Williams	Puma	Hess Sports Group
Wexford	(Republic of Ireland) Dave Connell	(Republic of Ireland) Lauren Dwyer	Jako	Mac's Caleta de Fuste

=== Managerial changes ===
Team	Outgoing manager	Manner of departure	Date of vacancy	Position in table	Incoming manager	Date of appointment
Cork City	(Republic of Ireland) Craig Robinson (Interim)	End of interim spell	8 October 2025	Pre-season	(Republic of Ireland) Barry Ryan	8 October 2025
Treaty United	(Republic of Ireland) Dave Rooney (interim)	End of interim spell	10 October 2025	Pre-season	(Republic of Ireland) Laurie Ryan	10 October 2025
Sligo Rovers	(Republic of Ireland) Steve Feeney	Resigned	13 October 2025	Pre-season	(Republic of Ireland) Gavin Hughes	21 December 2025
Peamount United	(Republic of Ireland) Emma Donohue	Resigned	15 October 2025	Pre-season	(Republic of Ireland) Gary Seery	15 October 2025
Shelbourne	(Republic of Ireland) Eoin Wearen	End of contract	20 October 2025	Pre-season	(Republic of Ireland) Seán Russell	7 November 2025
Wexford	(Republic of Ireland) Sean Byrne	Resigned	19 November 2025	Pre-season	(Republic of Ireland) Dave Connell	12 December 2025
Shamrock Rovers	(Republic of Ireland) Stephanie Zambra (interim)	End of interim spell	21 November 2025	Pre-season	(Republic of Ireland) James O'Callaghan	3 December 2025
Bohemians	(Albania) Alban Hysa	Resigned	6 January 2026	Pre-season	(Republic of Ireland) Alan Murphy	11 January 2026
Athlone Town	(Republic of Ireland) John Sullivan	Resigned	19 March 2026	6th	(Republic of Ireland) Lily Agg	28 May 2026
Cork City	(Republic of Ireland) Barry Ryan	Resigned	20 April 2026	12th	(Republic of Ireland) Derek Coughlan	14 May 2026
Peamount United	(Republic of Ireland) Gary Seery	Resigned	13 June 2026	8th	(Albania) Alban Hysa	14 June 2026

== League table ==
Pos	Team	Pld	W	D	L	GF	GA	GD	Pts	
1	Athlone Town	22	17	4	1	52	17	+35	55	Qualification for the Champions League second qualifying round
2	Shelbourne	22	12	7	3	43	22	+21	43	Qualification for the Europa Cup first qualifying round
3	Galway United	22	12	7	3	31	19	+12	43	
4	Shamrock Rovers	22	12	4	6	45	25	+20	40	
5	Wexford	22	10	6	6	42	27	+15	36	
6	Treaty United	22	10	6	6	31	21	+10	36	
7	Sligo Rovers	22	9	7	6	38	33	+5	34	
8	Bohemians	22	6	5	11	23	33	−10	23	
9	Peamount United	22	5	3	14	25	42	−17	18	
10	Waterford	22	3	6	13	18	47	−29	15	
11	DLR Waves	22	4	2	16	16	42	−26	14	
12	Cork City	22	2	3	17	17	53	−36	9	

Source: League of Ireland
Rules for classification: 1) Points; 2) Goal difference; 3) Goals scored.

== Results ==
Home \ Away	ATH	BOH	COR	DLR	GAL	PEA	SHA	SHE	SLI	TRE	WAT	WEX
Athlone Town		3–0	4–2	1–0	0–0	2–0	3–1	1–1	3–2	1–0	3–1	2–0
Bohemians	2–5		3–0	3–1	1–0	1–0	1–2	1–2	2–3	0–1	0–0	1–0
Cork City	0–3	2–0		0–1	0–3	6–0	0–2	0–3	0–3	0–2	1–2	1–3
DLR Waves	0–3	2–1	1–1		0–1	0–3	0–2	1–3	2–0	0–3	0–1	2–4
Galway United	2–1	0–1	3–2	2–0		2–1	3–3	2–2	2–1	0–0	1–1	2–1
Peamount United	0–2	2–2	0–0	1–0	1–2		0–3	2–4	1–1	0–2	3–0	1–2
Shamrock Rovers	1–2	0–0	4–1	2–0	0–1	0–2		5–2	4–1	1–0	1–1	2–4
Shelbourne	1–1	1–0	3–0	3–0	0–0	2–0	2–4		2–2	2–0	3–0	1–0
Sligo Rovers	1–1	5–1	4–0	3–1	1–1	2–1	0–5	1–0		1–1	1–2	1–0
Treaty United	1–4	1–0	5–0	3–2	0–2	1–0	0–0	1–1	1–1		3–0	1–1
Waterford	2–4	2–2	0–0	1–2	0–2	3–5	0–3	0–4	1–2	1–3		0–0
Wexford	0–3	1–1	4–1	1–1	3–0	5–2	2–0	1–1	2–2	4–2	4–0	

Source: League of Ireland
Legend: Blue = home team win; Yellow = draw; Red = away team win.

== Top Scorers ==
Rank	Player	Club	Goals
1	(United States) Dana Scheriff	Athlone Town	17
2	(Republic of Ireland) Emma Doherty	Galway United	13
3	(United States) Alexis Strickland	Athlone Town	10
3	(Canada) Courtney Chochol	Wexford	10
8	(Republic of Ireland) Sadhbh Doyle	Shamrock Rovers	9
8	(United States) Sydney Stephens*	Sligo Rovers	9
6	(Republic of Ireland) Eleanor Ryan-Doyle	Peamount United	8
6	(United States) Cara Jordan	Sligo Rovers	8
6	(Republic of Ireland) Katie Lawlee	Treaty United	8

*Departed the league through the season

=== Hat-tricks ===
Player	For	Against	Result	Date	Ref.
(United States) Dana Scheriff^{4}	Athlone Town	Bohemians	5–2 (A)	28 March 2026	
(Republic of Ireland) Emma Doherty	Galway United	Cork City	3–0 (A)	25 April 2026	
(United States) Sydney Stephens	Sligo Rovers	Bohemians	5–1 (H)	2 May 2026	

Note: ^{4} – player scored 4 goals

== See also ==
- 2026 All-Island Cup
- 2026 Women's FAI Cup
- 2026 League of Ireland Premier Division
- 2026 League of Ireland First Division
- 2026 FAI National League
- 2026 Men's FAI Cup
