= 2024 All-Island Cup =

Tournament details
- Country: Northern Ireland; Republic of Ireland
- Dates: 17 June 2024 – 17 August 2024
- Teams: 16; 11 (Republic of Ireland); 5 (Northern Ireland)

Final positions
- Champions: Galway United (Republic of Ireland) (2nd title)
- Runners-up: Shamrock Rovers

Tournament statistics
- Matches played: 31
- Goals scored: 106 (3.42 per match)

The 2024 edition of the All-Island Cup was the second ever edition of the tournament.

Galway United entered the tournament as the defending champions having defeated Cliftonville in the previous year's final.

The groups were drawn on 22 February 2024.

Galway United would retain their crown after defeating Shamrock Rovers in the final on penalties at Tallaght Stadium.

== Group A ==
Pos	Team	Pld	W	D	L	GF	GA	GD	Pts	Qualification
1	(Northern Ireland) Linfield	3	2	1	0	10	3	+7	7	Advance to knockout stage
2	(Republic of Ireland) Peamount United	3	2	1	0	9	2	+7	7	Advance to knockout stage
3	(Republic of Ireland) Bohemians	3	1	0	2	5	3	+2	3	
4	(Northern Ireland) Lisburn	3	0	0	3	0	16	−16	0	

Source: Soccerway

== Group B ==
Pos	Team	Pld	W	D	L	GF	GA	GD	Pts	Qualification
1	(Republic of Ireland) Shelbourne	3	2	1	0	6	2	+4	7	Advance to knockout stage
2	(Republic of Ireland) Wexford	3	1	1	1	9	4	+5	4	Advance to knockout stage
3	(Northern Ireland) Cliftonville	3	1	1	1	4	8	−4	4	
4	(Republic of Ireland) Cork City	3	0	1	2	3	8	−5	1	

Source: Soccerway

== Group C ==
Pos	Team	Pld	W	D	L	GF	GA	GD	Pts	Qualification
1	(Republic of Ireland) Shamrock Rovers	3	1	2	0	7	3	+4	5	Advance to knockout stage
2	(Republic of Ireland) Treaty United	3	1	2	0	4	2	+2	5	Advance to knockout stage
3	(Northern Ireland) Crusaders Strikers	3	1	1	1	3	4	−1	4	
4	(Republic of Ireland) DLR Waves	3	0	1	2	1	6	−5	1	

Source: Soccerway

== Group D ==
Pos	Team	Pld	W	D	L	GF	GA	GD	Pts	Qualification
1	(Republic of Ireland) Galway United	3	2	1	0	8	2	+6	7	Advance to knockout stage
2	(Republic of Ireland) Athlone Town	3	2	1	0	9	5	+4	7	Advance to knockout stage
3	(Northern Ireland) Glentoran	3	1	0	2	7	10	−3	3	
4	(Republic of Ireland) Sligo Rovers	3	0	0	3	2	9	−7	0	

Source: Soccerway

== Knockout stage ==
=== Bracket ===
Quarter-finals
(Republic of Ireland) Shelbourne	2
(Republic of Ireland) Athlone Town	1
(Republic of Ireland) Shamrock Rovers	3
(Republic of Ireland) Peamount United	0
(Republic of Ireland) Galway United	1
(Republic of Ireland) Treaty United	0
(Northern Ireland) Linfield	2
(Republic of Ireland) Wexford	3

Semi-finals
(Republic of Ireland) Shelbourne	1
(Republic of Ireland) Shamrock Rovers	2
(Republic of Ireland) Galway United (p)	2 (4)
(Republic of Ireland) Wexford	2 (2)

Final
17 August – Tallaght
(Republic of Ireland) Shamrock Rovers	0 (3)
(Republic of Ireland) Galway United (p)	0 (4)

=== Final ===
17 August 2024
19:35 IST

Shamrock Rovers (Republic of Ireland)	0–0 (a.e.t.)	(Republic of Ireland) Galway United
	Report
Penalties
Zambra (penalty scored); O'Gorman (penalty scored); Kelly (penalty scored); Ralph (penalty missed); Herron (penalty missed)	3–4	(penalty scored) Kinnevey; (penalty scored) Thompson; (penalty missed) Slattery; (penalty scored) Meaney; (penalty scored) Erickson

Tallaght Stadium, Dublin
Attendance: 1,347
Referee: Alan Patchell
