= 2025 All-Island Cup =

Tournament details
- Country: Northern Ireland; Republic of Ireland
- Dates: 25 April 2025 – 31 August 2025
- Teams: 16; 12 (Republic of Ireland); 4 (Northern Ireland)

Final positions
- Champions: Wexford (Republic of Ireland) (1st title)
- Runners-up: Bohemians (Republic of Ireland)

Tournament statistics
- Matches played: 31
- Goals scored: 94 (3.03 per match)

The 2025 edition of the All-Island Cup was the third ever edition of the tournament.

Galway United entered the tournament as the defending champions having won both of the previous editions of the tournament, including defeating Shamrock Rovers in the previous year's final.

Wexford would win the tournament for the first time after defeating Bohemians in the final on penalties at Ferrycarrig Park.

== Group A ==
Pos	Team	Pld	W	D	L	GF	GA	GD	Pts	Qualification
1	(Republic of Ireland) Shelbourne	3	2	1	0	11	2	+9	7	Advance to knockout stage
2	(Republic of Ireland) Bohemians	3	1	2	0	4	3	+1	5	Advance to knockout stage
3	(Republic of Ireland) Sligo Rovers	3	0	2	1	2	7	−5	2	
4	(Northern Ireland) Linfield	3	0	1	2	3	8	−5	1	

Source: Soccerway

== Group B ==
Pos	Team	Pld	W	D	L	GF	GA	GD	Pts	Qualification
1	(Republic of Ireland) Wexford	3	2	0	1	8	2	+6	6	Advance to knockout stage
2	(Republic of Ireland) Shamrock Rovers	3	2	0	1	8	3	+5	6	Advance to knockout stage
3	(Northern Ireland) Lisburn Rangers	3	2	0	1	4	6	−2	6	
4	(Republic of Ireland) DLR Waves	3	0	0	3	1	10	−9	0	

Source: Soccerway

== Group C ==
Pos	Team	Pld	W	D	L	GF	GA	GD	Pts	Qualification
1	(Republic of Ireland) Galway United	3	2	1	0	5	2	+3	7	Advance to knockout stage
2	(Republic of Ireland) Peamount United	3	1	2	0	4	1	+3	5	Advance to knockout stage
3	(Northern Ireland) Cliftonville	3	0	2	1	4	5	−1	2	
4	(Republic of Ireland) Cork City	3	0	1	2	3	8	−5	1	

Source: Soccerway

== Group D ==
Pos	Team	Pld	W	D	L	GF	GA	GD	Pts	Qualification
1	(Northern Ireland) Glentoran	3	2	1	0	7	3	+4	7	Advance to knockout stage
2	(Republic of Ireland) Treaty United	3	1	2	0	3	2	+1	5	Advance to knockout stage
3	(Republic of Ireland) Athlone Town	3	1	0	2	4	2	+2	3	
4	(Republic of Ireland) Waterford	3	0	1	2	1	8	−7	1	

Source: Soccerway

== Knockout stage ==
=== Bracket ===
Quarter-finals
(Northern Ireland) Glentoran	1
(Republic of Ireland) Bohemians	3
(Republic of Ireland) Shelbourne	6
(Republic of Ireland) Treaty United	0
(Republic of Ireland) Galway United	3
(Republic of Ireland) Shamrock Rovers	1
(Republic of Ireland) Wexford	1
(Republic of Ireland) Peamount United	0

Semi-finals
(Republic of Ireland) Bohemians (p)	2 (6)
(Republic of Ireland) Shelbourne	2 (5)
(Republic of Ireland) Galway United	0
(Republic of Ireland) Wexford	1

Final
31 August – Ferrycarrig Park
(Republic of Ireland) Wexford (p)	1 (5)
(Republic of Ireland) Bohemians	1 (3)

== Final ==
31 August 2025
16:35 IST

Wexford (Republic of Ireland)	1–1 (a.e.t.)	(Republic of Ireland) Bohemians
Molloy 66'	Report	McEvoy 33'
Penalties
Molloy (penalty scored); Kelly (penalty scored); De Mange (penalty scored); Cromack (penalty scored); Cassin (penalty scored)	5–3	(penalty scored) McGovern; (penalty scored) McEvoy; (penalty missed) Kane; (penalty scored) Donnelly

Ferrycarrig Park, Wexford
Attendance: 2,201
Referee: Rob Dowling
