= 2020 Women's National League (Ireland) =

Tenth season of top women's football (soccer) league in Republic of Ireland

Women's National League
- Season: 2020
- Dates: 8 August 2020 – 5 December 2020
- Champions: Peamount United; 3rd WNL title
- Champions League: Peamount United
- Matches: 52
- Goals: 189 (3.63 per match)
- Top goalscorer: Áine O'Gorman (14 goals)
- Biggest home win: Peamount United 8–0 Athlone Town (29 August 2020)
- Biggest away win: Treaty United 0–7 Shelbourne (10 October 2020)
- Highest scoring: Bohemians 4–5 Treaty United (31 October 2020)

The 2020 Women's National League was the 10th season of the Women's National League, the highest women's association football league in the Republic of Ireland.

The League lacked a title sponsor, as the Só Hotel Group did not renew their agreement from the previous season. Barretstown were announced as a "charity partner" on 24 July 2020. Expansion teams Athlone Town and Bohemians competed for the first time.

Following the financial collapse of Limerick F.C., they were replaced by a new team, Treaty United. Kilkenny United were excluded for a variety of reasons, including that they had not bonded with the local league, they had changed venues for home games, did not train in Kilkenny, lacked a qualified manager, and had produced poor results (just seven points in the last three seasons combined [60 matches]).

Originally scheduled to kick off on 15 March, the season's opening was delayed, initially to late June by the COVID-19 pandemic. A reduced season eventually kicked-off in August 2020. The WNL Cup was deferred for the season, but the 2020 FAI Women's Cup was effectively a League Cup, with the nine Women's National League clubs the only participants.

On 21 November 2020, Peamount United won their second consecutive title and third overall after a 3–1 win over Shelbourne.

== Teams ==

Team	Home town/suburb	Stadium	2019 finish
Athlone Town	Athlone	Athlone Town Stadium	n/a
Bohemians	Dublin (Coolock)	Oscar Traynor Centre	n/a
Cork City	Cork	Bishopstown Stadium	5th
Galway	Galway	Eamonn Deacy Park	4th
Treaty United	Limerick	Markets Field	n/a
Peamount United	Newcastle, County Dublin	Greenogue	1st
Shelbourne	Dublin (Drumcondra)	Tolka Park	2nd
DLR Waves	Dún Laoghaire	Jackson Park	6th
Wexford Youths	Crossabeg	Ferrycarrig Park	3rd

=== Personnel and kits ===
Note: Flags indicate national team as has been defined under FIFA eligibility rules. Players may hold more than one non-FIFA nationality.

Team	Manager	Captain	Kit manufacturer	Shirt sponsor
Athlone Town	(Republic of Ireland) Tommy Hewitt	(Republic of Ireland) Paula Doran	Nike	Palfinger
Bohemians	(Republic of Ireland) Sean Byrne	(Republic of Ireland) Sinead O’Farrelly	O'Neills	ICHH - Inner City Helping Homeless
Cork City	(Republic of Ireland) Ronán Collins	(Republic of Ireland) Katie McCarthy	Adidas	
DLR Waves	(Republic of Ireland) Graham Kelly	(Republic of Ireland) Catherine Cronin	Jako	Eversheds Sutherland
Galway	(Republic of Ireland) Billy Clery	(Republic of Ireland) Keara Cormican	Uhlsport	Só Hotels
Peamount United	(Republic of Ireland) James O’Callaghan	(Republic of Ireland) Áine O'Gorman	O'Neills	Texaco Newcastle Service Station
Shelbourne	(England) Dave Bell	(Republic of Ireland) Pearl Slattery	Umbro	FlyeFit
Treaty United	(Republic of Ireland) Dave Rooney	(Republic of Ireland) Marie Curtin	Umbro	Ei Electronics
Wexford Youths	(England) Tom Elmes	(Republic of Ireland) Kylie Murphy	Jako	Energia

== Format ==
In the initial phase of the season, the nine teams played a round-robin tournament whereby each team played each one of the other teams once. After eight games, the league split into two sections of five and four teams, with each team playing every other team in their section once.

== League table ==
=== Standings ===
Pos	Team	Pld	W	D	L	GF	GA	GD	Pts	Qualification or relegation (Note: Teams play each other once (eight matches), before the league is split into two groups (the top five and the bottom four).)
1	Peamount United (C)	12	11	0	1	40	9	+31	33	Qualification for the Champions League first round
2	Shelbourne	12	9	1	2	37	15	+22	28	
3	Wexford Youths	12	7	1	4	27	16	+11	22	
4	Cork City	12	6	1	5	21	25	−4	19	
5	Galway	12	4	2	6	15	20	−5	14	
6	DLR Waves	11	2	4	5	12	13	−1	10	
7	Athlone Town	11	3	1	7	9	27	−18	10	
8	Treaty United	11	3	0	8	16	37	−21	9	
9	Bohemians	11	1	2	8	12	27	−15	5	

Updated to match(es) played on 5 December 2020. Source: FAI Women’s National League, Soccerway, Extratime.com
(C) Champions

=== Positions by round ===
The table lists the positions of teams after each week of matches. In order to preserve chronological evolvements, any postponed matches are not included to the round at which they were originally scheduled, but added to the full round they were played immediately afterwards.

Team ╲ Round	1	2	3	4	5	6	7	8	9	10	11	12
Athlone Town	7	6	6	8	9	7	7	9	8	8	7	—
Bohemians	8	9	9	9	8	9	9	8	9	9	9	—
Cork City	6	7	7	7	7	5	4	4	4	4	4	4
DLR Waves	5	5	5	6	6	8	8	7	6	7	6	—
Galway	4	4	2	3	3	4	5	5	5	5	5	5
Peamount United	1	1	3	2	2	2	2	1	1	1	1	1
Shelbourne	2	3	1	1	1	1	1	2	2	2	2	2
Treaty United	9	8	8	5	5	6	6	6	7	6	8	—
Wexford Youths	3	2	4	4	4	3	3	3	3	3	3	3

Source: Extratime.com
= Leader and UEFA Women's Champions League; = Second; = Third

== Results ==
=== Matches 1–8 ===
Teams play each other once.

Home \ Away	ATH	BOH	COR	DLR	GAL	PEA	SHE	TRE	WEX
Athlone Town	—	—	—	1–4	—	—	0–3	3–2	0–1
Bohemians	1–0	—	3–4	—	1–4	0–3	—	—	—
Cork City	2–0	—	—	2–1	1–2	0–3	—	—	—
DLR Waves	—	0–0	—	—	—	—	1–2	0–2	0–2
Galway	3–0	—	—	1–1	—	—	1–1	1–0	—
Peamount United	8–0	—	—	3–2	2–1	—	—	5–0	—
Shelbourne	—	3–0	3–1	—	—	1–5	—	—	2–1
Treaty United	—	2–1	2–5	—	—	—	0–7	—	1–5
Wexford	—	4–1	1–2	—	3–1	3–0	—	—	—

Source: Extratime.com
Legend: Blue = home team win; Yellow = draw; Red = away team win.

=== Matches 9–11/12 ===
After eight matches, the league split into two sections i.e. the top five and the bottom four, with the teams playing every other team in their section once (either at home or away). The exact matches were determined by the position of the teams in the league table at the time of the split.

==== Group one ====
Home \ Away	COR	GAL	PEA	SHE	WEX
Cork City	—	2–1	—	—	2–2
Galway	—	—	0–2	—	0–2
Peamount United	3–0	—	—	3–1	—
Shelbourne	4–0	5–0	—	—	—
Wexford	—	—	1–2	2–5	—

Source: Extratime.com
Legend: Blue = home team win; Yellow = draw; Red = away team win.

==== Group two ====
Home \ Away	ATH	BOH	DLR	TRE
Athlone Town	—	2–1	—	—
Bohemians	—	—	0–0	4–5
DLR Waves	0–0	—	—	—
Treaty United	2–3	—	0–3	—

Source: Extratime.com
Legend: Blue = home team win; Yellow = draw; Red = away team win.

== Statistics ==
=== Top scorers ===
Rank	Player	Club	Goals
1	(Republic of Ireland) Áine O'Gorman	Peamount United	14
2	(Republic of Ireland) Eleanor Ryan Doyle	Peamount United	10
3	(Republic of Ireland) Ellen Molloy	Wexford Youths	8
4	(Republic of Ireland) Aoife Horgan	Treaty United	6
4	(Republic of Ireland) Lynsey McKey	Galway	6
4	(Republic of Ireland) Saoirse Noonan	Cork City	6
7	(Republic of Ireland) Noelle Murray	Shelbourne	5
7	(Republic of Ireland) Aoife Thompson	Galway	5
7	(Republic of Ireland) Ciara Grant	Shelbourne	5
7	(Republic of Ireland) Jessica Ziu	Shelbourne	5
7	(Republic of Ireland) Emily Whelan	Shelbourne	5
7	(Republic of Ireland) Stephanie Roche	Peamount United	5

== Awards ==
=== Monthly awards ===
Month	Player of the Month		References
Month	Player	Club	References
August	(Republic of Ireland) Ellen Molloy	Wexford Youths	
September	(Republic of Ireland) Saoirse Noonan	Cork City	
October	(Republic of Ireland) Jessica Ziu	Shelbourne	
November	(Republic of Ireland) Karen Duggan	Peamount United	

=== Annual awards ===
Award	Winner	Club
WNL Player of the Year	(Republic of Ireland) Karen Duggan	Peamount United
Young Player of the Year	(Republic of Ireland) Ellen Molloy	Wexford Youths
Services to the Women's National League	(Republic of Ireland) Michael Hayes	

WNL Team of the Year
Goalkeeper	(Republic of Ireland) Eve Badana (DLR Waves)			
Defenders	(Republic of Ireland) Niamh Farrelly (Peamount United)	(Republic of Ireland) Pearl Slattery (Shelbourne)	(Republic of Ireland) Claire Walsh (Peamount United)	(Republic of Ireland) Shauna Brennan (Galway)
Midfielders	(Republic of Ireland) Ellen Molloy (Wexford Youths)		(Republic of Ireland) Karen Duggan (Peamount United)	(Republic of Ireland) Jessica Ziu (Shelbourne)
Forwards	(Republic of Ireland) Áine O'Gorman (Peamount United)		(Republic of Ireland) Eleanor Ryan-Doyle (Peamount United)	(Republic of Ireland) Saoirse Noonan (Cork City)

== Broadcasting ==
The title-deciding match between Peamount United and Shelbourne on 21 November 2020 was streamed live by the Football Association of Ireland on their FAI TV YouTube channel. The annual awards ceremony was televised live on Eir Sport 1.

== See also ==
- 2020 FAI Women's Cup
