= 2025 League of Ireland Women's Premier Division =

Irish women's football league season

Premier Division
- Season: 2025
- Dates: 8 March 2025 – 12 October 2025
- Champions: Athlone Town
- Champions League: Athlone Town
- Matches: 132
- Goals: 465 (3.52 per match)
- Top goalscorer: Kelly Brady (20 goals)
- Biggest home win: Shelbourne 8–0 Sligo Rovers (30 August 2025)
- Biggest away win: Waterford 0–7 Galway United (21 June 2025); Waterford 1–8 Shamrock Rovers (27 September 2025)
- Highest scoring: Bohemians 2–7 Shelbourne (12 April 2025); Waterford 1–8 Shamrock Rovers (27 September 2025); Shamrock Rovers 5–4 Shelbourne (11 October 2025)
- Longest winning run: 9 matches Athlone Town; Shelbourne
- Longest unbeaten run: 20 matches Athlone Town
- Longest winless run: 17 matches Cork City
- Longest losing run: 11 matches Waterford
- Total attendance: 34,468
- Average attendance: 261

The 2025 Premier Division, also known as SSE Airtricity Women's Premier Division for sponsorship reasons, was the third edition of the top-tier women's football league in the Republic of Ireland since its restructure in 2022.

Athlone Town were defending champions, having won their first title in the 2024 season.

The first matches of the 2025 season were played on 8 March 2025. The final matchday was played on 11 October 2025.

== Teams ==
Twelve clubs participated in the 2025 season. This is an increase from the previous season as Waterford joined the league.

Locations of Women's Premier Division teams
Locations of Dublin Women's Premier Division teams

=== Stadiums and locations ===
Club	Town / City	Stadium	Capacity
Athlone Town	Athlone	Athlone Town Stadium	5,000
Bohemians	Dublin (Phibsborough)	Dalymount Park	4,500
Cork City	Cork	Turner's Cross	7,485
DLR Waves	Dublin (Dún Laoghaire)	UCD Bowl	3,000
Galway United	Galway	Eamonn Deacy Park	5,000
Peamount United	Dublin (Newcastle)	Greenogue	N/A
Shamrock Rovers	Dublin (Tallaght)	Tallaght Stadium	10,500
Shelbourne	Dublin (Drumcondra)	Tolka Park	5,750
Sligo Rovers	Sligo	The Showgrounds	3,873
Treaty United	Limerick	Markets Field	4,500
Waterford	Waterford	RSC	5,160
Wexford	Crossabeg	Ferrycarrig Park	2,500

=== Personnel and kits ===
Team	Manager	Captain	Kit manufacturer	Shirt sponsor
Athlone Town	(Republic of Ireland) John Sullivan	(Jamaica) Izzy Groves	Nike	Valeo Futbol
Bohemians	(Albania) Alban Hysa	(Republic of Ireland) Rachael Kelly	O'Neills	Dublin Bus
Cork City	(Republic of Ireland) Craig Robinson (Interim)	(Republic of Ireland) Ciara McNamara	Rebel Army	Zeus Packaging
DLR Waves	(Republic of Ireland) Laura Heffernan	(Republic of Ireland) Jessica Gleeson	Balon Direct	Dún Laoghaire–Rathdown County Council
Galway United	(Republic of Ireland) Phil Trill	(Republic of Ireland) Lynsey McKey	O'Neills	Comer Property Management
Peamount United	(Republic of Ireland) Emma Donohue (Republic of Ireland) Gary Seery	(Republic of Ireland) Chloe Moloney	Uhlsport	IP Telecom
Shamrock Rovers	(Republic of Ireland) Stephanie Zambra (interim)	(Republic of Ireland) Áine O'Gorman	Macron	Blake Brothers Food Service
Shelbourne	(Republic of Ireland) Eoin Wearen	(Republic of Ireland) Pearl Slattery	O'Neills	Chadwicks
Sligo Rovers	(Republic of Ireland) Steve Feeney	(Republic of Ireland) Emma Hansberry	Umbro	Avant Money
Treaty United	(Republic of Ireland) Dave Rooney (interim)	(United States) Jillian O'Toole	O'Neills	Trade Electric Group
Waterford	(Republic of Ireland) Gary Hunt	(Republic of Ireland) Danielle Griffin	Puma	Hess Sports Group
Wexford	(Republic of Ireland) Sean Byrne	(Republic of Ireland) Kylie Murphy	Jako	Mac's Caleta de Fuste

=== Managerial changes ===
Team	Outgoing manager	Manner of departure	Date of vacancy	Position in table	Incoming manager	Date of appointment
Treaty United	(Republic of Ireland) Dominic Foley	Resigned	13 October 2024	Pre-season	(Republic of Ireland) Sean Russell	15 October 2024
Wexford	(Republic of Ireland) Hugh Strong	Sacked	13 October 2024	Pre-season	(Republic of Ireland) Sean Byrne	8 January 2025
Athlone Town	(Republic of Ireland) Ciarán Kilduff	Resigned	19 October 2024	Pre-season	(Republic of Ireland) Colin Fortune	26 November 2024
Peamount United	(Republic of Ireland) James O'Callaghan	Resigned	22 October 2024	Pre-season	(Republic of Ireland) Emma Donohue (Republic of Ireland) Gary Seery	8 December 2024
Bohemians	(Republic of Ireland) Ken Kiernan	Resigned	15 November 2024	Pre-season	(Albania) Alban Hysa	23 November 2024
Cork City	(England) Danny Murphy	Sacked	17 December 2024	Pre-season	(Republic of Ireland) Frank Kelleher	8 January 2025
Waterford	Inaugural			Pre-season	(Republic of Ireland) Gary Hunt	20 January 2025
Shamrock Rovers	(Republic of Ireland) Collie O'Neill	Resigned	24 July 2025	5th	(Republic of Ireland) Stephanie Zambra (interim)	26 July 2025
Cork City	(Republic of Ireland) Frank Kelleher	Resigned	13 August 2025	12th	(Republic of Ireland) Craig Robinson (interim)	13 August 2025
Athlone Town	(Republic of Ireland) Colin Fortune	Resigned	7 September 2025	1st	(Republic of Ireland) John Sullivan (Note: Sullivan was initially named as interim head coach, before being appointed on a permanent basis on 10 October 2025.)	9 September 2025
Treaty United	(Republic of Ireland) Sean Russell	Resigned	29 September 2025	7th	(Republic of Ireland) Dave Rooney (interim)	2 October 2025

== League table ==
Pos	Team	Pld	W	D	L	GF	GA	GD	Pts	Qualification
1	Athlone Town (C)	22	17	4	1	53	10	+43	55	Qualification for 2026–27 Champions League first round
2	Shelbourne	22	16	0	6	70	25	+45	48	
3	Galway United	22	14	3	5	54	28	+26	45	
4	Wexford	22	13	2	7	40	28	+12	41	
5	Shamrock Rovers	22	11	4	7	51	31	+20	37	
6	Peamount United	22	11	3	8	40	26	+14	36	
7	Bohemians	22	10	5	7	42	34	+8	35	
8	Treaty United	22	10	3	9	34	41	−7	33	
9	DLR Waves	22	5	3	14	25	57	−32	18	
10	Sligo Rovers	22	3	3	16	18	60	−42	12	
11	Waterford	22	4	0	18	20	67	−47	12	
12	Cork City	22	2	2	18	18	58	−40	8	

Source: LeagueOfIreland.ie
(C) Champions

== Results ==
Home \ Away	ATH	BOH	COR	DLR	GAL	PEA	SHA	SHE	SLI	TRE	WAT	WEX
Athlone Town		2–0	2–0	3–1	1–1	3–0	2–0	2–1	4–0	3–1	3–0	2–0
Bohemians	2–2		2–0	3–1	1–3	1–2	0–1	2–7	3–2	1–2	1–0	3–0
Cork City	0–4	0–2		1–1	2–4	0–2	1–2	0–2	4–0	1–3	4–2	0–4
DLR Waves	0–5	2–5	1–1		1–3	2–1	1–4	0–4	1–0	0–2	4–2	0–0
Galway United	0–3	2–1	5–0	5–1		1–1	3–2	2–1	4–2	1–3	3–0	1–1
Peamount United	1–0	3–3	2–0	3–2	1–2		1–1	1–4	4–1	4–1	5–0	1–2
Shamrock Rovers	1–1	2–2	2–1	0–1	1–2	0–1		5–4	0–0	4–1	7–1	2–3
Shelbourne	1–2	1–3	7–0	4–0	2–1	1–0	1–2		8–0	2–0	2–1	2–1
Sligo Rovers	0–4	0–0	2–0	2–3	1–3	1–0	1–4	1–3		2–2	0–2	0–3
Treaty United	1–1	1–1	3–2	1–0	2–1	0–6	1–2	1–3	3–0		2–0	1–4
Waterford	0–2	0–3	3–1	4–2	0–7	0–1	1–8	0–4	0–2	3–2		1–2
Wexford	0–2	1–3	3–0	4–1	1–0	1–0	2–1	1–6	5–1	0–1	2–0	

Source: LeagueOfIreland.ie
Legend: Blue = home team win; Yellow = draw; Red = away team win.

== Positions by round ==
To preserve chronological evolvements, any postponed matches are not included to the round at which they were originally scheduled, but added to the full round they were played immediately afterwards. For example, if a match is scheduled for round 7, but then played between rounds 8 and 9, it will be added to the standings for round 8.

Team ╲ Round	1	2	3	4	5	6	7	8	9	10	11	12	13	14	15	16	17	18	19	20	21	22
Athlone Town	2	3	2	1	1	1	1	1	1	1	1	1	1	2	2	1	1	1	1	1	1	1
Shelbourne	8	5	3	2	2	2	2	2	2	2	2	2	2	1	1	2	2	2	2	2	2	2
Galway United	1	1	4	3	4	3	3	4	4	4	4	3	4	4	4	4	5	3	3	3	3	3
Wexford	11	8	10	6	6	5	4	3	3	3	3	4	3	3	3	3	3	4	4	4	4	4
Shamrock Rovers	5	4	1	5	5	6	6	5	5	5	5	5	5	5	5	6	6	7	8	8	6	5
Peamount United	3	7	7	9	9	7	7	7	7	7	7	7	8	8	8	8	7	8	7	6	5	6
Bohemians	6	9	6	8	10	10	8	8	8	8	8	8	7	6	6	7	7	6	6	5	7	7
Treaty United	4	2	5	4	3	4	5	6	6	6	6	6	6	7	7	5	4	5	5	7	8	8
DLR Waves	12	11	12	12	12	12	12	12	12	12	12	11	9	9	10	9	9	9	9	9	9	9
Sligo Rovers	7	10	11	11	11	11	11	11	11	11	11	12	12	11	9	10	10	10	10	10	10	10
Waterford	10	12	9	7	8	8	9	9	10	10	10	9	10	10	11	11	11	11	11	11	11	11
Cork City	9	6	8	10	7	9	10	10	9	9	9	10	11	12	12	12	12	12	12	12	12	12

Leader and qualification for 2026–27 Champions League preliminary round

== Top Scorers ==
Rank	Player	Club	Goals
1	(United States) Kelly Brady	Athlone Town	20
2	(United States) Mackenzie Anthony	Shelbourne	16
3	(Republic of Ireland) Emma Doherty	Galway United	13
3	(United States) Isabella Flocchini	Treaty United	13
5	(Republic of Ireland) Emily Corbet	Shamrock Rovers	12
5	(Republic of Ireland) Kate Mooney	Shelbourne	12
6	(Republic of Ireland) Ellen Molloy	Wexford	11
8	(Republic of Ireland) Ellen Dolan	Peamount United	10
8	(Republic of Ireland) Áine O'Gorman	Shamrock Rovers	10
10	(United States) Madison Gibson	Athlone Town	8
10	(Republic of Ireland) Katie McCarn	Bohemians	8
10	(Republic of Ireland) Kylie Murphy	Wexford	8

=== Hat-tricks ===
Player	For	Against	Result	Date	Ref.
(Republic of Ireland) Kate Mooney	Shelbourne	Sligo Rovers	3–1 (A)	21 June 2025	
(Republic of Ireland) Emily Corbet	Shamrock Rovers	Waterford	7–1 (H)	29 July 2025	
(Republic of Ireland) Katie McCarn	Bohemians	DLR Waves	5–2 (A)	2 August 2025	
(United States) Mackenzie Anthony^{4}	Shelbourne	Sligo Rovers	8–0 (H)	30 August 2025	
(United States) Kelly Brady	Athlone Town	Cork City	4–0 (A)	1 October 2025	
(Republic of Ireland) Kylie Murphy	Wexford	Cork City	3–0 (H)	11 October 2025	

Note: ^{4} – player scored 4 goals

== See also ==
- 2025 All-Island Cup
- 2025 League of Ireland Premier Division
- 2025 League of Ireland First Division
