= 2023 All-Island Cup =

Tournament details
- Country: Northern Ireland; Republic of Ireland
- Dates: 17 June 2023 – 23 July 2023
- Teams: 11; 9 (Republic of Ireland); 5 (Northern Ireland)

Final positions
- Champions: Galway United (Republic of Ireland) (1st title)
- Runners-up: Cliftonville (Northern Ireland)

Tournament statistics
- Matches played: 27
- Goals scored: 80 (2.96 per match)

The 2023 All-Island Cup, known as the 2023 Avenir Sports Women's All-Island Cup for sponsorship purposes, was a women's association football competition held on an all-Ireland basis between women's football clubs from Northern Ireland and the Republic of Ireland. It was founded in 2023.

== Background ==
Historically, association football in Northern Ireland and the Republic of Ireland was organised separately due to the two associations holding separate UEFA membership. In 2023, the Republic of Ireland's Football Association of Ireland came up with the idea of an all-Ireland competition in advance of the 2023 FIFA Women's World Cup, designed to keep competitive women's football going during this time. It was also envisaged to showcase women's association football in the island of Ireland. The idea was supported by Northern Ireland's Irish Football Association and the competition was planned with 11 teams from the FAI's League of Ireland Women's Premier Division and 5 from the IFA's Women's Premiership. The draw for the inaugural competition was made at the FAI's Headquarters in Dublin.

Prior to the semi-finals, due to Cliftonville qualifying, there was concern over the date of the final due to a potential clash with either the Northern Ireland women's national football team matches or the 2023 NIFL Women's Premiership League Cup Cliftonville were due to play in. However the Irish League agreed to move it. Galway United were the first All-Ireland Cup champions by defeating Cliftonville 1–0 at The Showgrounds, Sligo, winning their first major women's trophy.

=== Group A ===
Pos	Team	Pld	W	D	L	GF	GA	GD	Pts	Qualification
1	(Republic of Ireland) Galway United	3	2	1	0	3	0	+3	7	Advance to Semi-finals
2	(Republic of Ireland) Shelbourne	3	1	1	1	5	4	+1	4	
3	(Republic of Ireland) Athlone Town	3	1	1	1	3	5	−2	4	
4	(Northern Ireland) Linfield	3	0	1	2	2	4	−2	1	

Source: Extra time

=== Group B ===
Pos	Team	Pld	W	D	L	GF	GA	GD	Pts	Qualification
1	(Republic of Ireland) Wexford	3	2	1	0	8	5	+3	7	Advance to Semi-finals
2	(Republic of Ireland) Shamrock Rovers	3	2	0	1	8	8	0	6	
3	(Northern Ireland) Glentoran	3	1	1	1	8	4	+4	4	
4	(Republic of Ireland) Peamount United	3	0	0	3	2	9	−7	0	

Source: Extra time

=== Group C ===
Pos	Team	Pld	W	D	L	GF	GA	GD	Pts	Qualification
1	(Northern Ireland) Cliftonville	3	2	1	0	5	3	+2	7	Advance to Semi-finals
2	(Northern Ireland) Sion Swifts	3	2	0	1	6	3	+3	6	
3	(Republic of Ireland) Bohemians	3	1	0	2	4	4	0	3	
4	(Republic of Ireland) Sligo Rovers	3	0	1	2	3	8	−5	1	

Source: Extra time

=== Group D ===
Pos	Team	Pld	W	D	L	GF	GA	GD	Pts	Qualification
1	(Republic of Ireland) Cork City	3	3	0	0	6	2	+4	9	Advance to Semi-finals
2	(Republic of Ireland) DLR Waves	3	2	0	1	6	3	+3	6	
3	(Northern Ireland) Crusaders Strikers	3	1	0	2	4	6	−2	3	
4	(Republic of Ireland) Treaty United	3	0	0	3	3	8	−5	0	

Source: Extra time

=== Semi-finals ===
Team 1	Score	Team 2
Cliftonville (Northern Ireland)	1–0	(Republic of Ireland) Cork City
Wexford (Republic of Ireland)	1–1 (3–4 p)	(Republic of Ireland) Galway United

=== Final ===
23 July 2023
15:00 IST

Cliftonville (Northern Ireland)	0–1	(Republic of Ireland) Galway United
	Report	McGuinness 12'

The Showgrounds, Sligo
Attendance: 579
Referee: Robert Dowling
