= 2023 All-Island Cup final =

- Event: 2023 All-Island Cup
Cliftonville	Galway United
(Northern Ireland)	(Republic of Ireland)
0	1
- Date: 23 July 2023
- Venue: The Showgrounds, Sligo
- Referee: Robert Dowling
- Attendance: 579

The 2023 All-Island Cup final, known as the Avenir All-Island Cup final for sponsorship reasons, was the final match of the 2023 All-Island Cup, a knock-out women's association football competition contested annually by clubs affiliated with the Football Association of Ireland and the Irish Football Association. It took place on 23 July 2023 at The Showgrounds in Sligo, and was contested by Cliftonville and Galway United. Galway won the match 1–0 to win the cup for the first time, winning their first trophy as a club.

== Background ==
This was the inaugural edition of the comprtition, with 11 teams from the League of Ireland Women's Premier Division and 5 teams from the Women's Premiership taking part.

This was in Galway United's first season as a club following the demise of Galway WFC in 2022.

=== Route to the final ===
Note: In all results below, the score of the finalist is given first (H: home; A: away).

Cliftonville		Round	Galway United	
Opponent	Result	Group stage	Opponent	Result
Sion Swifts	2–1 (H)	Matchday 1	Linfield	1–0 (A)
Bohemians	2–1 (A)	Matchday 2	Athlone Town	0–0 (H)
Sligo Rovers	1–1 (H)	Matchday 3	Shelbourne	2–0 (H)
Group C: Pos / Team / Pld / Pts; 1 / (Northern Ireland) Cliftonville / 3 / 7; 2 / (Northern Ireland) Sion Swifts / 3 / 6; 3 / (Republic of Ireland) Bohemians / 3 / 3; 4 / (Republic of Ireland) Sligo Rovers / 3 / 1; Source: Extra time		Final standings	Group A: Pos / Team / Pld / Pts; 1 / (Republic of Ireland) Galway United / 3 / 7; 2 / (Republic of Ireland) Shelbourne / 3 / 4; 3 / (Republic of Ireland) Athlone Town / 3 / 4; 4 / (Northern Ireland) Linfield / 3 / 1; Source: Extra time	
Opponent	Result	Knockout stage	Opponent	Result
Cork City	1–0 (H)	Semi-final	Wexford	1–1 (4–3 p) (A)

== Match ==
=== Details ===
23 July 2023
15:00 IST

Cliftonville (Northern Ireland)	0–1	(Republic of Ireland) Galway United
	Report	McGuinness 12'

The Showgrounds, Sligo
Attendance: 579
Referee: Robert Dowling

Cliftonville	Galway United

GK	1	(Northern Ireland) Rachael Norney
DF	3	(Northern Ireland) Kelsie Burrows
DF	4	(Northern Ireland) Hannah Doherty
DF	5	(Northern Ireland) Fi Morgan
DF	6	(Northern Ireland) Toni Leigh Finnegan		(substituted off) 60'
MF	7	(Northern Ireland) Danielle Maxwell
MF	8	(Northern Ireland) Louise McDaniel		(substituted off) 86'
MF	10	(Northern Ireland) Victoria Carleton
MF	17	(Northern Ireland) Marissa Callaghan (c)
MF	20	(Northern Ireland) Orleigha McGuinness		(substituted off) 70'
FW	9	(Northern Ireland) Caitlin McGuinness
Substitutes:
GK	24	(Northern Ireland) Tiarna Bradley
DF	2	(Northern Ireland) Yasmin White	(yellow card) 84'	(substituted on) 70'
DF	19	(Northern Ireland) Katie Markey		(substituted on) 86'
DF	22	(Northern Ireland) Chelsea Irvine
DF	23	(Northern Ireland) Aisling Anderson
MF	25	(Northern Ireland) Kayla Campbell
FW	11	(Northern Ireland) Kirsty McGuinness		(substituted on) 60'
FW	16	(Northern Ireland) Tara Reilly
FW	28	(Northern Ireland) Claire Shaw
Manager:
(Northern Ireland) John McGrady

GK	20	(United States) Jessica Berlin
DF	2	(Republic of Ireland) Aoibheann Costello
DF	5	(Canada) Jamie Erickson
DF	14	(Republic of Ireland) Therese Kinnevey
DF	22	(Republic of Ireland) Eve Dossen
MF	4	(United States) Isabella Beletic
MF	6	(Republic of Ireland) Jenna Slattery
MF	8	(Republic of Ireland) Kate Thompson
MF	10	(Republic of Ireland) Lynsey McKey (c)		(substituted off) 79'
MF	25	(Republic of Ireland) Aislinn Meaney		(substituted off) 74'
FW	11	(Northern Ireland) Gemma McGuinness		(substituted off) 87'
Substitutes:
GK	1	(Republic of Ireland) Abbiegayle Ronayne
DF	15	(Republic of Ireland) Amy Madden
MF	7	(Republic of Ireland) Nicole McNamara		(substituted on) 87'
MF	12	(Republic of Ireland) Jodie Griffin		(substituted on) 79'
MF	16	(Republic of Ireland) Abbie Callanan
MF	21	(Republic of Ireland) Siobhan Doolan
MF	24	(Republic of Ireland) Emma Duffy
FW	13	(Republic of Ireland) Rola Olusola	(yellow card) 90+1'	(substituted on) 74'
FW	19	(Republic of Ireland) Aoife Thompson
Manager:
(Republic of Ireland) Phil Trill
