= All-Island Cup =

All-Ireland association football tournament

- Organiser(s): Football Association of Ireland
- Founded: 2023
- Region: Northern Ireland; Republic of Ireland
- Teams: 16
- Current champions: (Republic of Ireland) Shelbourne (1st title)
- Most championships: (Republic of Ireland) Galway United (2 titles)
- 2026 All-Island Cup

The All-Island Cup, known as the Avenir Sports Women's All-Island Cup for sponsorship purposes, is a women's association football competition held on an all-Ireland basis between women's football clubs from Northern Ireland and the Republic of Ireland. It was founded in 2023.

== Background ==
Historically, association football in Northern Ireland and the Republic of Ireland was organised separately due to the two associations holding separate UEFA membership. In 2023, the Republic of Ireland's Football Association of Ireland (FAI) came up with the idea of an all-Ireland competition in advance of the 2023 FIFA Women's World Cup, designed to keep competitive women's football going during this time. It was also envisaged to showcase women's association football in the island of Ireland. The idea was supported by Northern Ireland's Irish Football Association (IFA) and the competition was planned with 11 teams from the FAI's League of Ireland Women's Premier Division and 5 from the IFA's Women's Premiership. The draw for the inaugural competition was made at the FAI's Headquarters in Dublin.

== Results ==
=== By final ===
Season	Winner	Score	Runners-up	Venue
2023	(Republic of Ireland) Galway United	1–0	(Northern Ireland) Cliftonville	The Showgrounds, Sligo
2024	(Republic of Ireland) Galway United	0–0 (a.e.t.) (4–3 p)	(Republic of Ireland) Shamrock Rovers	Tallaght Stadium, Tallaght
2025	(Republic of Ireland) Wexford	1–1 (a.e.t.) (5–3 p)	(Republic of Ireland) Bohemians	Ferrycarrig Park, Wexford
2026	(Republic of Ireland) Shelbourne	2–0	(Republic of Ireland) Galway United	Tolka Park, Dublin

=== By club ===
Club	Title(s)	Runners-up	Seasons won	Seasons runners-up
(Republic of Ireland) Galway United	2	1	2023, 2024	2026
(Republic of Ireland) Wexford	1	0	2025	—
(Republic of Ireland) Shelbourne	1	0	2026	—
(Northern Ireland) Cliftonville	0	1	—	2023
(Republic of Ireland) Shamrock Rovers	0	1	—	2024
(Republic of Ireland) Bohemians	0	1	—	2025

== See also ==
- FAI Women's Cup
- IFA Women's Challenge Cup
