= Alban Hysa =

Albanian footballer and manager

Personal information
- Date of birth: 1978 (age 47–48)
- Place of birth: Yugoslavia
- Position: Midfielder

Senior career*
Years	Team	Apps	(Gls)
- Bohemians
2000–2001	Dublin City		(1)
2002–2003	Monaghan United		

Managerial career
- ????–2022: Peamount United U19 (women)
- 2022–2023: Treaty United (women)
- 2024: Bohemians U17 (women)
- 2024–2025: Bohemians (women)
- 2026–: Peamount United (women)
- * Club domestic league appearances and goals

Alban Hysa (born 1978) is an Albanian football manager and former footballer who played as a midfielder. He is currently the manager of LOI Women's Premier Division side Peamount United.

== Early life and playing career ==
Hysa was born in present-day Kosovo, back when it was part of Yugoslavia, and moved to the Republic of Ireland around 2000. As a footballer, he began playing football shortly after arriving in Ireland, playing briefly for Bohemians under Roddy Collins. Later on, he played in the League of Ireland for Dublin City and Monaghan United.

== Managerial career ==
Hysa began coaching in women's football after spending a few years in the Football Association of Ireland's Emerging Talent Programme. By 2022, he was the manager of Peamount United's under-19 women's team, helping them win the EA Sports Cup against Shamrock Rovers. In December 2022, he was appointed the manager of Treaty United's women's team, later departing the club in November 2023.

After leaving Treaty United, Hysa was appointed the under-17 manager of Bohemians' women's team for the 2024 season, before being appointed as manager of the senior team in November 2024. In the 2025 season, he helped Bohemians reach both the FAI Women's Cup final and All-Island Cup final, resulting in him winning the Women's Premier Division Manager of the Year. However, he stepped down from the role on 6 January 2026.

On 14 June 2026, it was announced that Hysa had been appointed the manager of Peamount United's women's team.

== Personal life ==
Hysa is a Kosovar Albanian. Outside of football, he acquired a Bachelor of Arts in psychology in 2012, and works as a life coach.
