= Stephanie Zambra =

Irish footballer

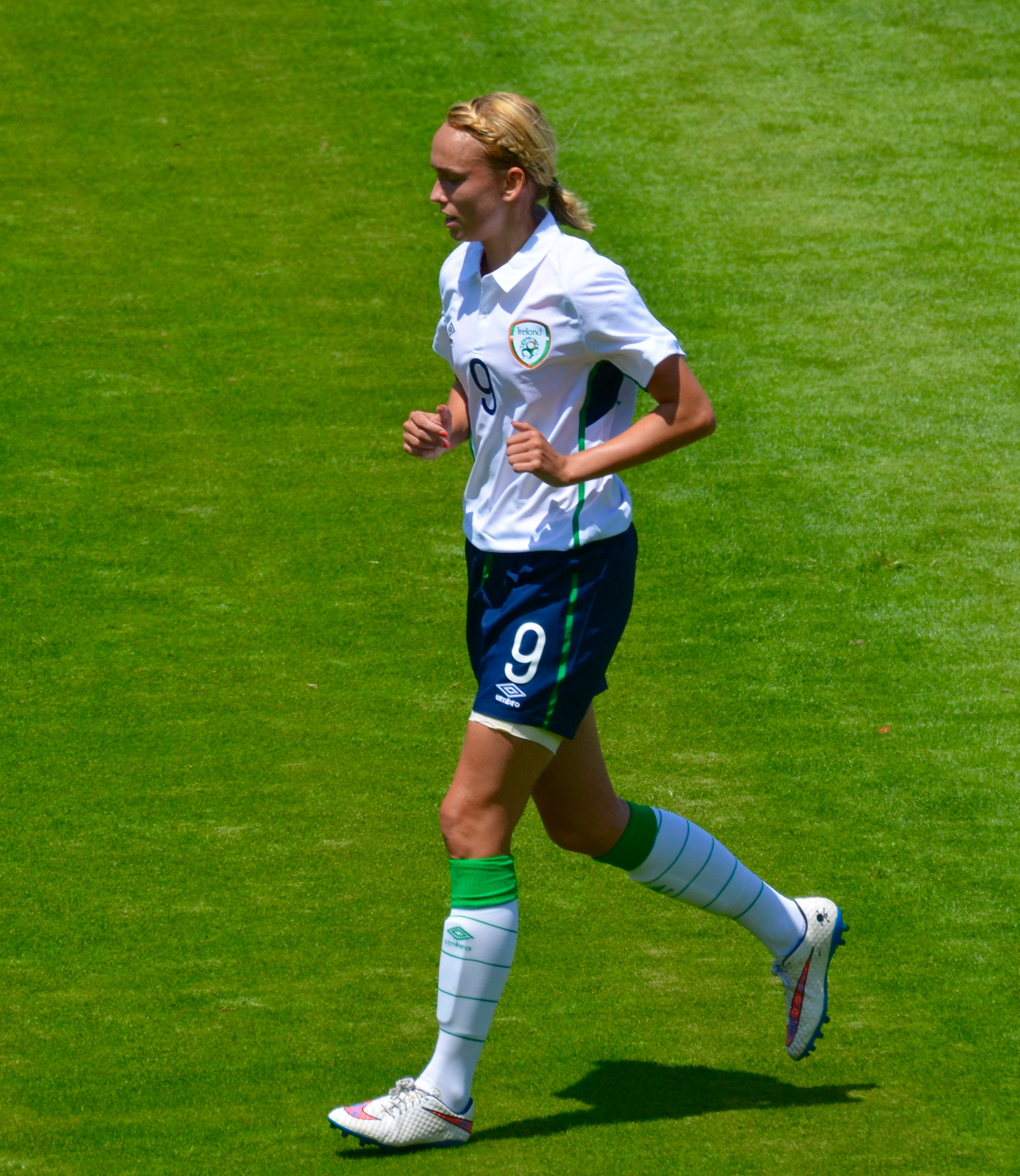
- Zambra with Republic of Ireland in 2015

Personal information
- Full name: Stephanie Zambra
- Birth name: Stephanie Roche
- Date of birth: 13 June 1989 (age 37)
- Place of birth: Dublin, Ireland
- Height: 1.83 m (6 ft 0 in)
- Position: Forward

Youth career
- Valeview Shankill FC
- Cabinteely Girls

Senior career*
Years	Team	Apps	(Gls)
2002–2007	Stella Maris		
2007–2009	Dundalk City		
2009–2011	Raheny United		
2011–2014	Peamount United		(71)
2014	ASPTT Albi	10	(1)
2015	Houston Dash	2	(0)
2015–2018	Sunderland Ladies	26	(2)
2018–2020	C.F. Florentia	10	(0)
2020–2022	Peamount United		
2022–2024	Shamrock Rovers Women		

International career^{‡}
2008–2022	Republic of Ireland	58	(14)

Managerial career
- 2025: Shamrock Rovers Women
- * Club domestic league appearances and goals as of 12 July 2020 (UTC) ‡ National team caps and goals as of 6 September 2022

Stephanie Zambra (née Roche; born 13 June 1989) is an Irish retired footballer who played as a striker for Shamrock Rovers of Dublin and the Republic of Ireland women's national football team. Her October 2013 goal in the Women's National League (WNL) for Peamount United was the runner-up for the 2014 FIFA Puskás Award for the best goal of the year.

At club level Zambra played for various clubs in her native Ireland, including a successful three-year period at Peamount United from 2011 to 2014. She had short spells with Division 1 Féminine team ASPTT Albi in 2014 and National Women's Soccer League club Houston Dash in 2015. A longer stint at FA WSL club Sunderland from 2015 to 2018 was interrupted by injury and illness, before she spent a year in Italy with Florentia in 2018 and 2019. She joined Peamount United for a second time in February 2020. In December 2022, she joined newly re-formed Shamrock Rovers ahead of the 2023 season.

After winning her first senior cap in October 2008, Zambra has made over 50 appearances for the Republic of Ireland national team. She was absent for almost two years after breaking her leg in during Ireland's failed 2019 FIFA Women's World Cup qualification campaign, but was recalled in August 2019.

Zambra stated in February 2020 that she enjoyed very good luck when her famous goal opened up wider opportunities for her, but that much of her subsequent football career has been plagued by correspondingly bad luck. She has worked for RTÉ as a television pundit, covering events including the 2018 and 2022 editions of the FIFA World Cup, and UEFA Euro 2020.

== Early life ==
Zambra began playing football with the boys on the streets of her native Shankill. After a brief spell with Valeview Shankill FC was curtailed by rules against mixed-gender football, Zambra turned out for Cabinteely Girls. She progressed to playing for Stella Maris, where she struck up a forward partnership with Áine O'Gorman in the club's Under-18 team.

In 2008 Zambra was awarded a Football Association of Ireland (FAI) scholarship to Sallynoggin College. She was named in an Irish Colleges team which travelled to Scotland for two friendlies in April 2009.

== Club career ==
=== Early career ===
In June 2007, Zambra moved to Dundalk City and reportedly enjoyed a "dream debut", scoring twice in a 5–2 win over Benfica. After moving on to Raheny United, Zambra went on trial with English FA WSL club Doncaster Rovers Belles in February 2011, playing in a 4–0 friendly win over Blackburn Rovers.

=== Peamount United ===
In the inaugural 2011–12 Women's National League season, Zambra won the Golden Boot by scoring 26 goals for champions Peamount United. She formed a "devastating" striking partnership with Player of the Year Sara Lawlor. Zambra also scored the winner in the WNL Cup final to secure a double. In August 2011, Zambra played for Peamount United in the 2011–12 UEFA Women's Champions League. Following Peamount's elimination by Paris Saint-Germain Féminine, Zambra rejected a transfer offer from FC Vendenheim. She recaptured the league Golden Boot from team-mate Lawlor in the 2013–14 Women's National League campaign.

==== FIFA Puskás Award ====
Zambra scored an acclaimed goal for Peamount against Wexford Youths in October 2013 which went viral on YouTube and brought her international attention. It was her first goal of the WNL season and was uploaded to the internet by team manager Eileen Gleeson as the matches were not televised. Zambra was glad it was captured for posterity: "It's just good for us now to get that on camera, it gives the Women's National League a bit of publicity as well as girls' football in Ireland, and I'm happy to be a part of that as well."

Later that year she was shortlisted for the 2014 FIFA Puskás Award, for the best goal of the year. She was the only female player to be nominated. Following an initial public vote, Zambra's goal was nominated as one of three finalists, alongside James Rodríguez and Robin van Persie, who had both scored their nominated goals at the 2014 FIFA World Cup. She was the sixth female player to be nominated for the award, and the first to rank among the finalists. At the 2014 FIFA Ballon d'Or awards ceremony on 12 January 2015, Zambra finished in second place to Rodríguez for the FIFA Puskás Award, with 33% of the vote.

=== ASPTT Albi ===
In June 2014, Zambra signed for newly promoted Division 1 Féminine team ASPTT Albi. She failed to settle in France, scoring once in ten appearances before quitting the club amidst the FIFA Puskás Award publicity. Albi manager David Welferinger said: "This departure is linked to what is happening to her at the moment. She has been in high demand in recent weeks. I understand her decision even if it's sad." Zambra later explained that she was on an unfeasibly low salary in France having negotiated her own contract. She was particularly exasperated when the team failed to communicate the travel arrangements for a friendly match and departed with Zambra left behind. The "final straw" arrived when the team were made to wear revealing outfits for a promotional photo shoot.

=== Houston Dash ===
On 18 February 2015 Zambra signed with the Houston Dash. Dash coach Randy Waldrum hailed Zambra as: "possibly the best goalscorer to come out of Ireland since Olivia O'Toole". After making only two brief substitute appearances in the National Women's Soccer League, Zambra was waived by the Houston Dash on 20 May 2015. Zambra was "shocked and disappointed" to be discarded three months into her one-year contract, but understood the club's reasoning. Although he was satisfied with Zambra's progress, Waldrum urgently needed to improve the team's defence. He had to release Zambra to free up an international slot and roster space for defensive reinforcements Camila Martins Pereira and Ellie Brush.

=== Sunderland ===
Zambra signed a two-year deal with FA WSL club Sunderland A.F.C. Ladies on 17 June 2015. Her appearances in the 2016 FA WSL season were curtailed by illness, when she developed an abscess in her throat which ultimately required a tonsillectomy. She sustained a broken leg while on international duty in September 2017 and was released from her Sunderland contract in Summer 2018, when the club failed to secure a license for the top two tiers of women's football in England. At Sunderland Zambra was often played out of position as a wing-back, which she did not enjoy.

=== Florentia ===
They promised me the sun, moon and stars but let's just say it wasn't what it was cracked up to be. I had issues on and off the field. It was a nightmare.

— Zambra on her time in Italy

Zambra agreed a transfer to Italian Serie A club C.F. Florentia in November 2018. An ankle injury derailed her early progress and she started just one of her four appearances in the remainder of the 2018–19 Serie A season. For 2019–20 the club relocated from Florence to San Gimignano. The new campaign looked promising for Zambra when she scored eight goals in pre-season, but she failed to register a goal in seven competitive league and cup appearances.

She grew increasingly disillusioned with aspects of her time at the club and decided to leave after one year: "I don't want to talk bad about the club or anything - I finished on good terms - but there was a lot of stuff that didn't go the way I wanted it to go. And I came to the realisation that it wasn't for me." Zambra later explained that she had not been paid in accordance with her contract and as of October 2021 was still owed two months' wages by Florentia.

=== Back to Peamount ===
In February 2020 Zambra re-signed for Peamount United. In moving back to the Women's National League she wanted to be closer to her friends and family, to plan for her career after football and to win back her national team place. When the delayed 2020 Women's National League season started she was disrupted by a cracked rib and then a calf injury. She also missed the UEFA Women's Champions League fixture against Glasgow City in November 2020, under contact tracing rules. A consistent run of games at the end of the season saw a return to form for Zambra, who scored twice and was named Player of the Match in Peamount's 6–0 2020 FAI Women's Cup Final win over Cork City.

Zambra's appearance on the reality television show Special Forces: Ultimate Hell Week disrupted her preparations for the 2021 Women's National League season. Although she scored nine goals in 26 appearances, tiredness and minor injuries continued to reduce her effectiveness as Peamount lost their WNL title to Shelbourne on the final day. Nevertheless, Peamount manager James O'Callaghan was pleased when Zambra agreed to return for the 2022 Women's National League season, rejecting transfer offers from DLR Waves and Bohemians. Zambra began the new season in top form, scoring four goals in five games and being named WNL Player of the Month for March 2022. She finished the season with 16 goals, as Peamount came third in the table behind Shelbourne and Athlone Town.

=== Shamrock Rovers ===
On 8 December 2022, it was announced that Zambra would be joining the newly reformed Shamrock Rovers women's team ahead of the 2023 season, following other former Peamount players Áine O'Gorman and Summer Lawless to the Tallaght outfit. Zambra faced a demanding schedule as she had agreed to participate in the sixth season of Dancing with the Stars alongside training with her new club. She also announced her intention to play football under her married name, Stephanie Zambra, from the start of the 2023 season.

=== Retirement ===
Zambra announced her retirement from professional football on 10 October 2024.

== International career ==
=== Youth ===
Zambra represented the Republic of Ireland at the youth level, saying: "I just missed out in the final trials for Ireland under 15s and I was really heartbroken. But then I made the team at under 17s." In August 2005, she scored the winning goal on her under 19 debut, securing a 3–2 win over Finland at Richmond Park. In three seasons at the under-19 level, Zambra remained a regular pick and was the team's top-goalscorer.

=== Senior ===
Zambra's senior international debut came in a 3–0 UEFA Women's Euro 2009 qualifying play-off defeat by Iceland in October 2008. She replaced Stef Curtis for the last five minutes of the match at Laugardalsvöllur. In September 2009, Zambra scored her first senior goal, a late winner in the 2–1 World Cup qualifying win over Kazakhstan at Turners Cross. In the following month's return fixture, Roche made her first start for the Irish senior team. She scored again, the equaliser in another 2–1 win for Ireland. Zambra scored her third goal for Ireland during a home friendly defeat by France in March 2010. Despite her equaliser, a controversial penalty from Sonia Bompastor and Marie-Laure Delie's late winner gave the French victory.

National coach Susan Ronan dropped Zambra from the squad for a friendly with Austria in June 2013 and the subsequent 2015 FIFA Women's World Cup qualifiers. This left her disappointed but keen to win back her place: "I was dropped against Austria and wasn't told why or what the story was. I've played for the last few years so it hurt me to be let go while not knowing what was happening so I'd love to get back in again." After Zambra re-discovered her goal-scoring form at the club level, Ronan re-called her in October 2013.

On 5 April 2014 in a 2015 FIFA Women's World Cup qualifier against Germany at Tallaght Stadium, Zambra equalised the game at 2–2 in the 89th minute. But Ireland lost 3–2 when Melanie Leupolz scored in injury time. In the penultimate qualifier Zambra scored an injury time goal of her own to secure a 1–0 victory over Slovakia in Senec on 13 September 2014.

Zambra continued to be selected by Sue Ronan for Ireland's UEFA Women's Euro 2017 qualifying Group 2 fixtures. In June 2016 Zambra scored a hat-trick in Ireland's 9–0 win over Montenegro. That brought her tally to four goals in four days, as she had scored Ireland's consolation as they were beaten 4–1 by Finland in Valkeakoski. When Ronan decided to step down as national team coach, Zambra scored a "stunning 25-yard free-kick" in her farewell match, a 2–1 win over the Basque Country at Tallaght Stadium on 26 November 2016.

Under Ronan's successor Colin Bell, Zambra maintained her national team place. She scored in Bell's first game in charge, a 2–0 win over the Czech Republic at the 2017 Cyprus Cup on 1 March 2017. The following month, Zambra was among a delegation of 13 players who secured substantially improved working conditions for Ireland's female national team players, following a protracted dispute with the Football Association of Ireland. She then scored the only goal from a penalty kick as Ireland beat Slovakia in a friendly match which had been at risk of cancellation due to the dispute.

In Ireland's opening 2019 FIFA Women's World Cup qualifier, a 2–0 win over Northern Ireland in Lurgan, Zambra suffered a broken tibia. She returned to training in January 2018 but experienced knee pain when kicking the ball, then further scans detected another fracture and meniscus damage. In February 2019 Zambra expressed annoyance at a newspaper report which incorrectly stated she had retired from international football: "I'm not after retiring, I'm just injured like!"

Ireland's interim manager Tom O'Connor recalled Zambra after almost two years for the opening UEFA Women's Euro 2022 qualifier against Montenegro at Tallaght Stadium on 3 September 2019. Zambra appeared as a late substitute in Ireland's 1–1 draw in Greece on 12 November 2019, but was then left out by new head coach Vera Pauw for the double-header against Greece and Montenegro in March 2020. When Heather Payne was injured in the first match, Zambra was called up as her replacement for the fixture in Montenegro.

Following an injury to Kyra Carusa, Pauw recalled Zambra in June 2022 for a friendly against the Philippines in Antalya, Turkey, and a 2023 FIFA Women's World Cup qualification – UEFA Group A fixture against Georgia. Zambra had continued to attend training sessions throughout her exile from the national team and was praised by Pauw for her professionalism. In Ireland's 1–0 win over the Philippines Zambra started her first national team game since 2017.

=== International appearances ===
Appearances and goals by national team and year
National team	Year	Apps	Goals
Republic of Ireland	2008	1	0
Republic of Ireland	2009	4	2
Republic of Ireland	2010	6	1
Republic of Ireland	2011	4	0
Republic of Ireland	2012	5	0
Republic of Ireland	2013	5	0
Republic of Ireland	2014	10	3
Republic of Ireland	2015	8	1
Republic of Ireland	2016	7	5
Republic of Ireland	2017	6	2
Republic of Ireland	2019	1	0
Republic of Ireland	2022	1	0
Total		58	14

=== International goals ===
Scores and results list Republic of Ireland's goals first. Score column indicates score after each Zambra goal. Updated as of 16 May 2023.

International goals scored by Stephanie Zambra
No.	Cap	Date	Venue	Opponent	Score	Result	Competition	Ref.
1	4	24 September 2009	Turners Cross, Cork	Kazakhstan	2–1	2-1	2011 FIFA Women's World Cup Qual.	
2	5	29 October 2009	Zhetysu Stadium, Taldykorgan	Kazakhstan	1-1	2–1	2011 FIFA Women's World Cup Qual.	
3	6	25 February 2010	Richmond Park, Dublin	France	1-1	1–2	Friendly	
4	28	10 March 2014	Tasos Markou, Paralimni	Switzerland	2–1	2–1	2014 Cyprus Women's Cup	
5	29	5 April 2014	Tallaght Stadium, Dublin	Germany	2-2	2-3	2015 FIFA Women's World Cup Qual.	
6	34	13 September 2014	NTC Senec, Senec	Slovakia	1–0	1–0	2015 FIFA Women's World Cup Qual.	
7	38	11 March 2015	Valbruna, Rovinj	Costa Rica	1–0	2–1	2015 Istria Cup	
8	45	7 April 2016	Stadion pod Malim brdom, Petrovac	Montenegro	5–0	5-0	2017 UEFA Women's Championship Qual.	
9	47	3 June 2016	Tehtaan kenttä, Valkeakoski	Finland	1–3	1–4	2017 UEFA Women's Championship Qual.	
10	48	7 June 2016	Tallaght Stadium, Dublin	Montenegro	3-0	9-0	2017 UEFA Women's Championship Qual.	
11	48	7 June 2016	Tallaght Stadium, Dublin	Montenegro	7–0	9-0	2017 UEFA Women's Championship Qual.	
12	48	7 June 2016	Tallaght Stadium, Dublin	Montenegro	8–0	9-0	2017 UEFA Women's Championship Qual.	
13	51	1 March 2017	Tasos Markou, Paralimni	Czech Republic	2–0	2–0	2017 Cyprus Women's Cup	
14	55	10 April 2017	Tallaght Stadium, Dublin	Slovenia	1–0	1–0	Friendly	

== Coaching career ==
=== Shamrock Rovers ===
Following her retirement from professional football at the conclusion of the 2024 season, Zambra transitioned into coaching. On 13 January 2025, she was appointed as a first-team coach for Shamrock Rovers, joining the backroom staff of head coach Collie O'Neill ahead of the 2025 League of Ireland Women's Premier Division campaign.

On 26 July 2025, following O'Neill's departure, Zambra was elevated to interim head coach of the senior women's team. She steered the squad through the remainder of the 2025 season. She departed her role at the club in November 2025 ahead of a planned restructuring of the coaching setup for the 2026 season.

=== International and youth football ===
Zambra has also worked within the international youth framework, serving as an assistant coach for the Republic of Ireland women's national under-17 team. Alongside her elite-level roles, she co-founded and runs "Champion Coaching" with her husband, League of Ireland footballer Dean Zambra, delivering targeted fitness programs and developmental football clinics to counter the drop-out rate of teenage girls in sport.

== Personal life ==
At the time of her famous goal in October 2013, Zambra had been in a relationship with footballer Dean Zambra for almost seven years. She was an intern on the Football Association of Ireland's (FAI) Futsal project. She is a self-described Manchester United supporter. Stephanie and Dean were married in June 2022, after 15 years together.

== Honours ==
=== Player ===
Peamount United

- Women's National League: 2011–12, 2020
- FAI Women's Cup: 2020

Individual

- FIFA Puskás Award (2nd place) 2014
- FAI Women's National League Top Goalscorer: 2011–12, 2013–14
