= Aoibhe Brennan =

Irish footballer

Personal information
- Date of birth: 8 December 2007 (age 18)
- Place of birth: Clonee, Meath
- Position: Midfielder

Team information
- Current team: Manchester City
- Number: 41

Youth career
- 2022–2023: Shelbourne

Senior career*
Years	Team	Apps	(Gls)
2024–2026	Bohemians	44	(4)
2026–	Manchester City	0	(0)

International career^{‡}
2023–2024	Republic of Ireland U17	4	(0)
2025–	Republic of Ireland U19	1	(0)
- * Club domestic league appearances and goals as of 3 April 2026 (UTC) ‡ National team caps and goals as of 3 April 2026 (UTC)

Aoibhe Brennan (born 8 December 2007) is an Irish professional footballer who plays as a midfielder for Women Super League club Manchester City and the Republic of Ireland national team.

== Youth career ==
In 2022 Brennan joined the Shelbourne U17s. During her two years at the club she won the U17 League and Cup double twice.

== Club career ==
On 31 December 2023 Brennan signed for League of Ireland Women's Premier Division club Bohemians ahead of the 2024 season. Brennan would go on to score on her Premier Division debut against Wexford at the age of just 16.

She would go on to re-sign for the 2025 and 2026 seasons.

On 2 September 2026, Brennan was announced at Manchester City.

== International career ==
Brennan has represented the Republic of Ireland U17s and the Republic of Ireland U19s.

On 30 March 2026, Brennan was called up to the Republic of Ireland national team for their 2027 FIFA Women's World Cup Qualifiers against Poland. However she was forced to withdraw due to injury.

== Career statistics ==
=== Club ===
As of match played 28 March 2026

Appearances and goals by club, season and competition
Club	Season	League			FAI Cup		Other		Total	
Club	Season	Division	Apps	Goals	Apps	Goals	Apps	Goals	Apps	Goals
Bohemians	2024	LOI Premier Division	20	1	2	0	3 (Note: Appearances in the All-Island Cup)	1	25	2
Bohemians	2025	LOI Premier Division	21	2	1	0	5	0	27	2
Bohemians	2026	LOI Premier Division	3	1	0	0	0	0	3	1
Bohemians	Total		44	4	3	0	8	1	55	5
Career total			44	4	3	0	8	1	55	5
