= Ellen Molloy =

Irish footballer

Personal information
- Date of birth: 5 June 2004 (age 22)
- Place of birth: Kilkenny, Ireland
- Position: Midfielder

Team information
- Current team: Pittsburgh Riveters
- Number: 10

Youth career
- Thomastown United

Senior career*
Years	Team	Apps	(Gls)
2019–2024	Wexford Youths		(29)
2024–2025	Sheffield United	5	(1)
2025	Wexford FC	21	(11)
2026–	Shamrock Rovers	10	(4)
2026	→ Pittsburgh Riveters (loan)	10	(4)

International career^{‡}
2020–	Republic of Ireland	7	(0)
- * Club domestic league appearances and goals as of 6 July 2026 ‡ National team caps and goals as of 17 January 2026

Ellen Molloy (born 5 June 2004) is an Irish footballer who plays as a midfielder for Irish club Shamrock Rovers. In her club career, she has played for the Pittsburgh Riveters, Wexford FC and Sheffield United. She has also been capped by the Republic of Ireland women's national team.

== Club career ==
Molloy's youth soccer career was considered successful. She spent her developmental time with Thomastown United and the Presentation Secondary School in the city of Kilkenny. Her career took a step forward in 2019 at the age of 15 when she transferred to reigning WNL champions Wexford Youths.

Molloy debuted for Wexford Youths on the first day of the delayed 2020 Women's National League season, scoring two goals and serving one assist in a 4–1 home win over Bohemians. She won the WNL Player of the Month award for August 2020 and was praised by Wexford Youths coach Tom Elmes: "She has hit the ground running. She is versatile and can play in a number of different roles and she's done really well for us."

In September 2020 Molloy scored twice as Wexford inflicted a first defeat of the season on champions Peamount United. She scored another two goals, including a "goal of the season contender" against Galway on 31 October 2020. At the WNL Awards in December 2020, Molloy was named Young Player of the Season and named in the Team of the Season.

Molloy's impressive form continued into the 2021 Women's National League season. She scored four times in a 7–1 win over Treaty United, then hit a "brilliant, long range" goal in a 5–0 win over Galway two weeks later. She was named Player of the Match in the 2021 FAI Women's Cup Final, as Wexford Youths defeated Shelbourne 3–1. She retained her place in the Team of the Season at the 2021 WNL Awards. Having scored 13 goals from midfield she agreed to remain with Wexford Youths for the following season.

In 2022 Molloy had scored 16 goals and was the league's second top goal scorer as Wexford Youths challenged for the title. She suffered an anterior cruciate ligament injury in a September 2022 fixture against Treaty United and missed the run-in.

On 6 September 2024, Molloy was announced at Sheffield United.

In 2025, Molloy returned to Wexford FC, scoring 16 goals in all competitions. and playing a part as Wexford won the All-Island Cup.

On 16 January 2026, Wexford announced that Molloy had departed the club. A week later on 23 January, Shamrock Rovers announced they had signed her ahead of the 2026 season.

== International career ==
=== Youth ===
Molloy scored an acclaimed goal for the Republic of Ireland women's national under-17 football team against Iceland in February 2020 which went viral on social media and brought her to wider attention. The strike was later voted International Goal of the Year at the FAI International Football Awards, making Molloy the first female winner.

In September 2021 Molloy debuted for the Republic of Ireland women's national under-19 football team, scoring in her team's 2–1 friendly defeat by Norway in Portugal. She made five appearances throughout the year, scoring three goals.

=== Senior ===
Senior Republic of Ireland national team coach Vera Pauw called up Molloy for the first time on 28 August 2020, for the UEFA Women's Euro 2022 qualifier against Germany on 19 September 2020. Molloy made her senior international debut in Ireland's next match, against Ukraine in Kyiv on 23 October 2020. She was an 86th-minute substitute for Harriet Scott in Ireland's 1–0 defeat.

After allowing Molloy to gain experience with the under-19s, Pauw recalled her to the seniors in November 2021, for 2023 FIFA Women's World Cup qualification – UEFA Group A fixtures against Slovakia and Georgia. However a hamstring injury sustained in the 2021 FAI Women's Cup Final forced Molloy to drop out of the squad.

Molloy was called up again in February 2022, for the 2022 Pinatar Cup in Murcia. She sat her Leaving Cert mock exams early in order to take part. Molloy made her first start for Ireland on the occasion of her fifth cap, on 19 February 2022 in the 1–0 defeat by Russia.

Molloy was recalled to the national team for the UEFA Euro 2025 qualification playoffs against Georgia in October 2024, earning her seventh cap coming on as a substitute in the home leg.

=== International appearances ===
Appearances and goals by national team and year
National team	Year	Apps
Republic of Ireland	2020	2
Republic of Ireland	2021	2
Republic of Ireland	2022	2
Republic of Ireland	2024	1
Total		7

== Honours ==
Wexford FC

FAI Women's Cup: 2021

All-Island Cup: 2025

=== Pittsburgh Riveters ===
USL W League Great Forest Division: 2026
