= Gemma McGuinness =

Irish footballer

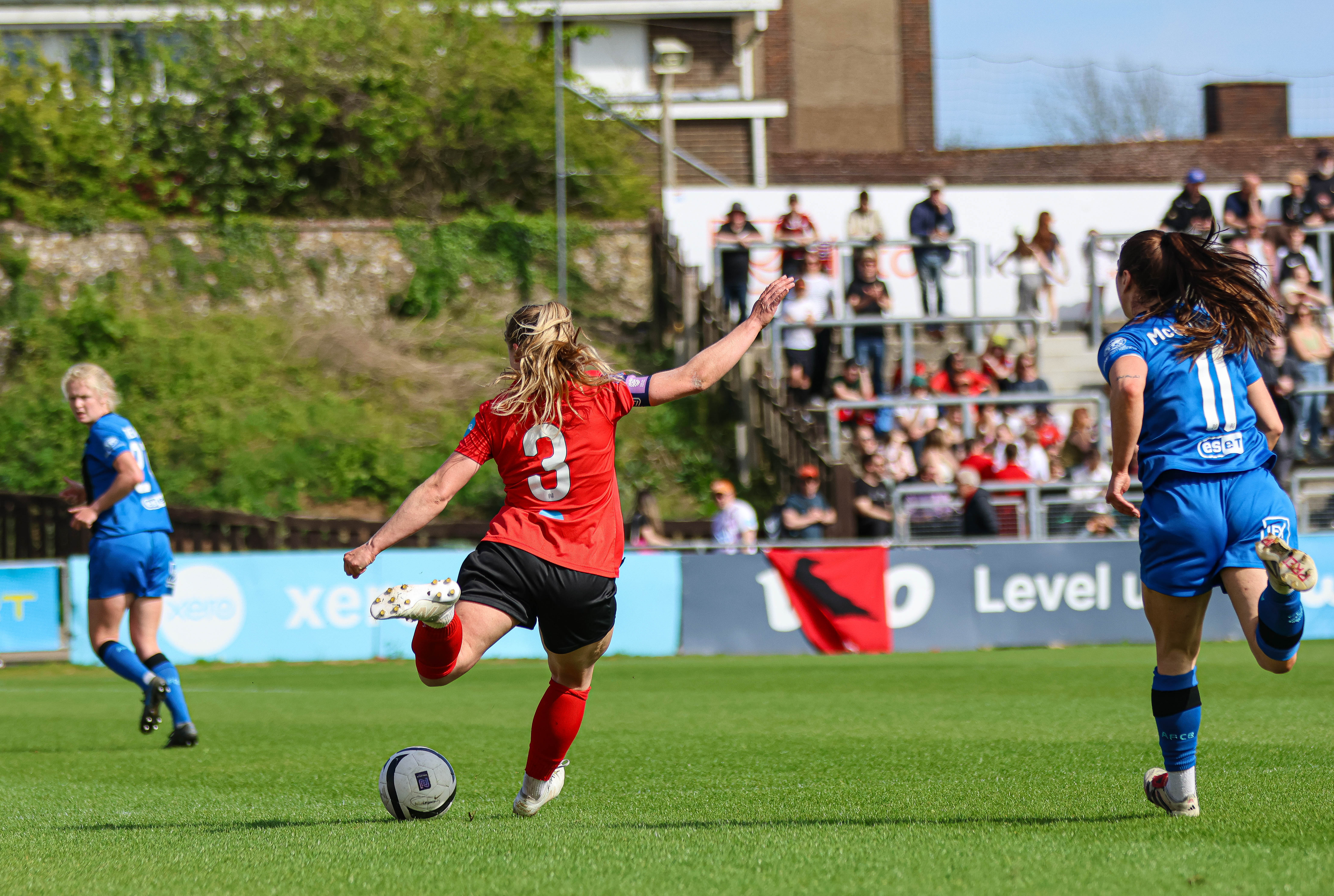

Personal information
- Date of birth: 7 August 1995 (age 31)
- Place of birth: Moville, Ireland
- Positions: Winger; forward

Team information
- Current team: AFC Bournemouth
- Number: 11

Youth career
- Greencastle FC

Senior career*
| Years | Team | Apps | (Gls) |
| 2016–2019 | Derry City | | |
| 2022 | Sligo Rovers | 18 | (7) |
| 2023 | Galway United | 16 | (5) |
| 2023–2026 | Bournemouth | | |

International career^{‡}
| 2011 | Republic of Ireland u17 | 3 | (2) |
| 2012 | Republic of Ireland u19 | 8 | (2) |
| 2019 | Northern Ireland | 1 | (0) |
| 2019 | Republic of Ireland Universities | | |
- * Club domestic league appearances and goals as of 14:21, 21 August 2022 (UTC) ‡ National team caps and goals as of 14:21, 21 August 2022 (UTC)

Gemma McGuinness (born 7 August 1995) is a former Irish footballer who played for Bournemouth, Galway United, Sligo Rovers and Derry City. A winger or forward, she has also represented the Republic of Ireland at youth level and Northern Ireland at senior level.

== Club career ==
McGuinness is from Moville in County Donegal. At youth level she played football for Greencastle FC, as well as for her school Moville Community College. In April 2013 she scored a hat-trick for the latter in their 4–3 FAI Schools Cup final win over Christ King.

When McGuinness went to Ulster University at Coleraine her football career was disrupted because there was no women's university football team. In her final year she began playing again at the university's Jordanstown campus in Belfast.

Having rediscovered her enthusiasm for football McGuinness progressed to playing for Derry City. In her first season with the Candystripes, 2016–17, her 14 goals helped secure promotion back to the Northern Ireland Women's Premiership. In 2019 her football career was disrupted again when she moved to Vietnam to work as a science teacher.

Returning from Vietnam after two years, McGuinness trained with Derry City but instead accepted an offer from newly-formed Women's National League (WNL) club Sligo Rovers. On 19 March 2022 the club secured its first ever competitive win, 2–1 over Cork City at Turners Cross. McGuinness scored the club's first official goal in the match.

McGuinness then joined Galway United for the 2023 season, and was an integral part of the team's inaugural season in the Women's Premier Division and also helping them qualify for the All-Island Cup final, scoring the winning penalty against Wexford Youths in the Semi-Final and scoring the Winning goal in the final against Cliftonville to win Galway United their first piece of silverware in 25 years, she wrote herself into Galway history with the goal before leaving a few weeks later for AFC Bournemouth.

After making the move over to England joining AFC Bournemouth in the FA Women's National League Division One South West the 4th Tier of English football, the club finished 2nd two points behind champions Exeter City she scored a total of 15 Goals in her debut season. In her second season at the club Bournemouth achieved promotion to the 3rd Tier they finished the season unbeaten as champions with 21 wins and 1 draw she scored a total of 12 goals. After achieving promotion to the FA Women's National League Southern Premier Division she was joined by fellow Irish woman Jessica Hennessy who joined the club from Nottingham Forrest, Bournemouth finished the season in 3rd place just outside of the promotion places the club finished behind both Watford who received promotion to WSL 2 and Plymouth Argyle who were defeated by Wolves in the Promotion Play-Off, the club picked up silverware winning the 2025–26 FA Women's National League Cup after beating Plymouth Argyle in the final. At the end of the 2025–26 she announced her retirement from Football

== International career ==
=== Youth ===
McGuinness represented Ireland at schoolgirl level while she attended Moville Community College. She progressed to playing for the Republic of Ireland women's national under-17 football team, scoring against Romania and hosts North Macedonia as Ireland negotiated the 2012 UEFA Women's Under-17 Championship qualification first round mini tournament in October 2011.

With the Republic of Ireland women's national under-19 football team, McGuinness scored in the opening 2013 UEFA Women's Under-19 Championship first qualifying round fixture, a 3–0 win over Cyprus in Inđija, Serbia, on 20 October 2012. Two days later she scored the final goal in an 11–0 win over Latvia.

Still eligible for under-19 football the following season, McGuinness was selected for two friendlies against Portugal in September 2013. Although an injury ruled her out of both matches, she recovered to participate in the 2014 UEFA Women's Under-19 Championship qualification series hosted by Ireland later that month.

While enrolled at the University of Ulster, McGuinness represented Ireland at the 2019 Summer Universiade.

=== Senior ===
In February 2019 McGuinness was given a first call-up by the Northern Ireland women's national football team for their appearance at the 2019 Turkish Women's Cup later that month. She had attended her first training camp with Northern Ireland the previous month.

McGuinness won her first senior cap on 5 March 2019, as an 83rd-minute substitute in Northern Ireland's 2–1 win over Uzbekistan which secured third place at the Turkish Women's Cup.

== Personal life ==
As well as being a footballer, McGuinness is a qualified nutritionist. In 2022 she was employed by Davey Nutrition.

== Honours ==
Galway United

- All-Island Cup: 2023

Bournemouth

- FA Women's National League Division One South West: 2024–25
- FA Women's National League Cup: 2025–26
