= Sligo Rovers F.C. (women) =

- Full name: Sligo Rovers Football Club Women
- Nickname: The Bit O'Red
- Founded: 2022
- Ground: The Showgrounds
- Capacity: 5,500 (4,000 seated)
- Owner: Supporter Owned
- Chairman: Tommy Higgins
- Manager: Gavin Hughes
- League: League of Ireland Women's Premier Division
- 2026: 7th
- Website: sligorovers.com
Home colours	Away colours

Sligo Rovers Football Club Women is an Irish association football club based in Sligo. In December 2021, the Football Association of Ireland (FAI) announced the formation of the club as an expansion team for the 2022 Women's National League season. The Team competes in the League of Ireland Women's Premier Division.

== History ==
In July 2018 Sligo Rovers were among 11 founding clubs in a new Under-17 Women's National League. Club chairman Tommy Higgins affirmed his commitment to women's football in May 2021, while announcing his ambition to rebuild The Showgrounds using "a huge element of public funding". In September 2021 the club announced plans to collaborate with Institute of Technology, Sligo, in fielding a senior women's team in the Women's National League from 2022. On 10 December 2021 the Football Association of Ireland (FAI) confirmed the acceptance of the club as an expansion team for the upcoming 2022 Women's National League season.

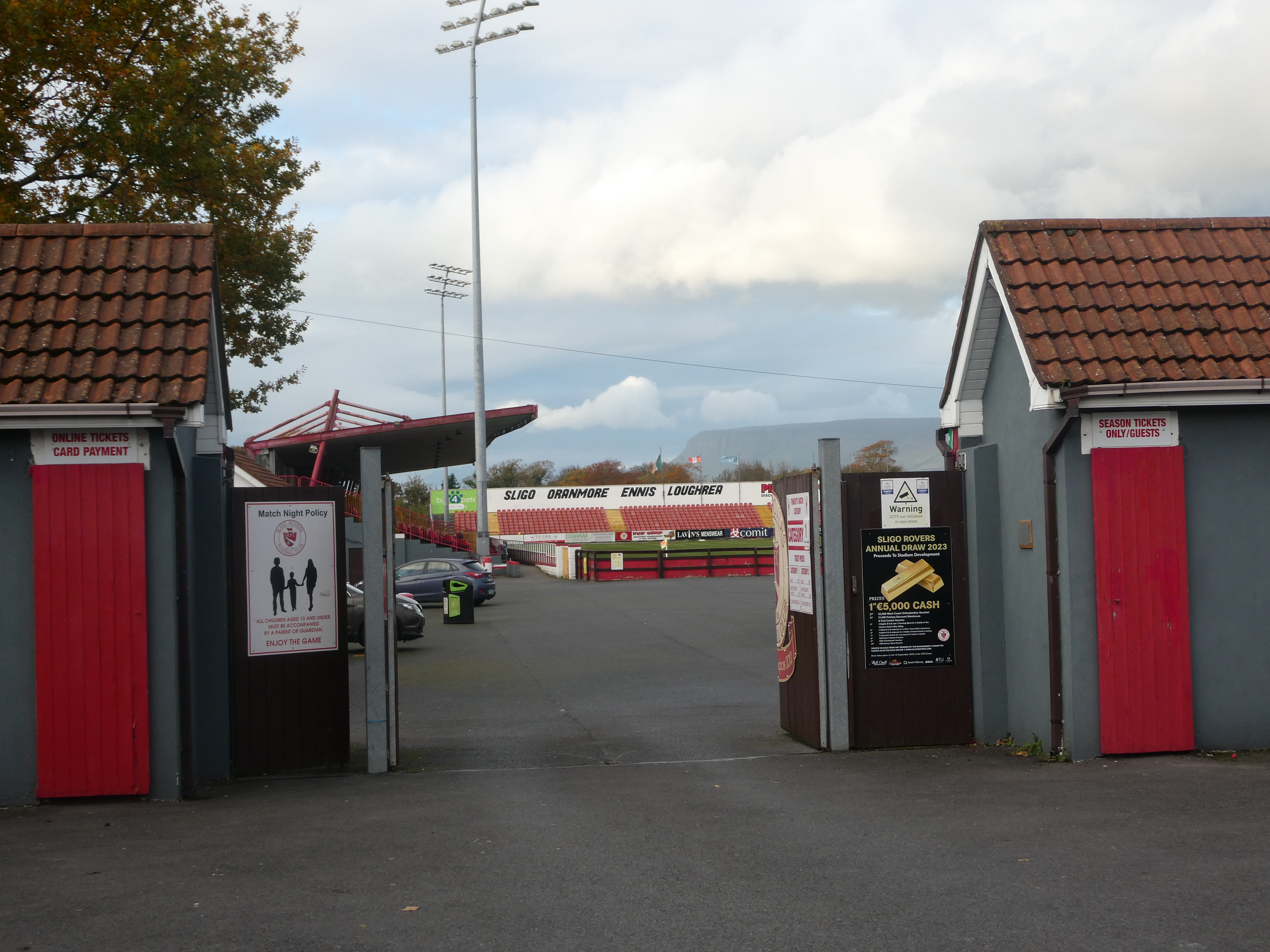
The Showgrounds

On 15 December 2021 former Rovers player Steve Feeney was appointed as the senior women's team's first manager, leaving his role at Ballinamallard United to take up the post. Emma Hansberry became the club's first signed player on 11 January 2022. Amy Hyndman and Katie Melly followed on 20 January.

On the opening day of the 2022 Women's National League, 5 March 2022, Sligo Rovers lost their first competitive match 6–0 at Peamount United. The FAI later awarded Sligo Rovers a 3–0 walkover win, when Peamount reported themselves for fielding an ineligible player in the match. Seven days later the first home match at The Showgrounds was lost 3–0 to DLR Waves before an encouraging crowd of 945. On 19 March 2022 the club secured its first ever competitive win, 2–1 over Cork City at Turners Cross. Gemma McGuinness scored the club's first official goal in the match, Emma Doherty scored Sligo's other goal.

Emma Hansberry scored the club's first goal at home in a 3-1 defeat to Bohemians. The clubs first win at the Showgrounds was a 3-1 triumph over Treaty United the goals coming from Emma Doherty and two from Mayo woman Aoife Brennan, Brennan's second goal a freekick on the cusp of half time went onto win the WNL Goal of the Season.

Sligo won against 4 time champions Wexford in the Showgrounds Emma Doherty scored the only goal in the game. Sligo's home fixture against reigning champions Shelbourne was broadcast on TG4 the visitors went 2-0 up after 20 minutes thanks to goals from Pearl Slattery and Alex Kavanagh, Sligo's Gemma McGuiness scored just before half-time Emma Doherty scored in the 53rd and 60th minute to put Sligo in the lead, It ended 3-2 in a hugely impressive win for Sligo against a Shelbourne team with the likes of Amanda Budden, Jess Gargan, Pearl Slattery, Alex Kavanagh, Rachel Graham, Keeva Keenan,Jessie Stapleton, Noelle Murray, Abbie Larkin and 2015 American World Cup winner and 3 time Olympic Gold Medalist Heather O'Reilly.

Sligo finished the season in 8th place with 6 wins and 20 points, Aoife Brennan won the League goal of the season for her Freekick against Treaty United at the Showgrounds, Emma Doherty was in the Team of the Year and was nominated for young player of the season which was won by Shelbourne's Jessie Stapleton and manager Steve Feeney was nominated for manager of the year which was won by Athlone Town manager Tommy Hewitt and in the FAI Cup they made in to the Quarterfinals losing out to Bohemians.

Northern Irish international Casey Howe and Emma Doherty were the key finishers in front of goal in the 2023 season with both of them scoring 10 goals in all competitions.

The club recorded two consecutive impressive cup runs in 2023 their first round game against amateur side Bonagee United seen Sligo record a hugely impressive 11-0 win Casey Howe and Emma Doherty both netted 5 goals each and substitute Amy Hyndman scored the other goal, in their quarterfinal against Bohemians captain Emma Hansberry scored the only goal in a 1-0 in Dalymount Park their cup run came to an end against eventual winners Athlone Town in a 4-0 loss at the Showgrounds with goals from Madison Gibson (2), Jesi Rossman and Roisin Molloy. The 2024 cup run under Tommy Hewitt started with a 5-0 win over Terenure Rangers with goals from Paula McGrory (2), Jodie Loughery, Keri Loughery and Rebecca Doddy, then a quarterfinal win against DLR Waves goals from Anna McDaniel, Kelsey Munroe and Paula McGrory seen them reach a second consecutive semi-final they would face Athlone in a repeat of their 2023 semi-final with Shauna Brennan scoring the sole goal to help Athlone reach the final were they eventually lost to Shelbourne.

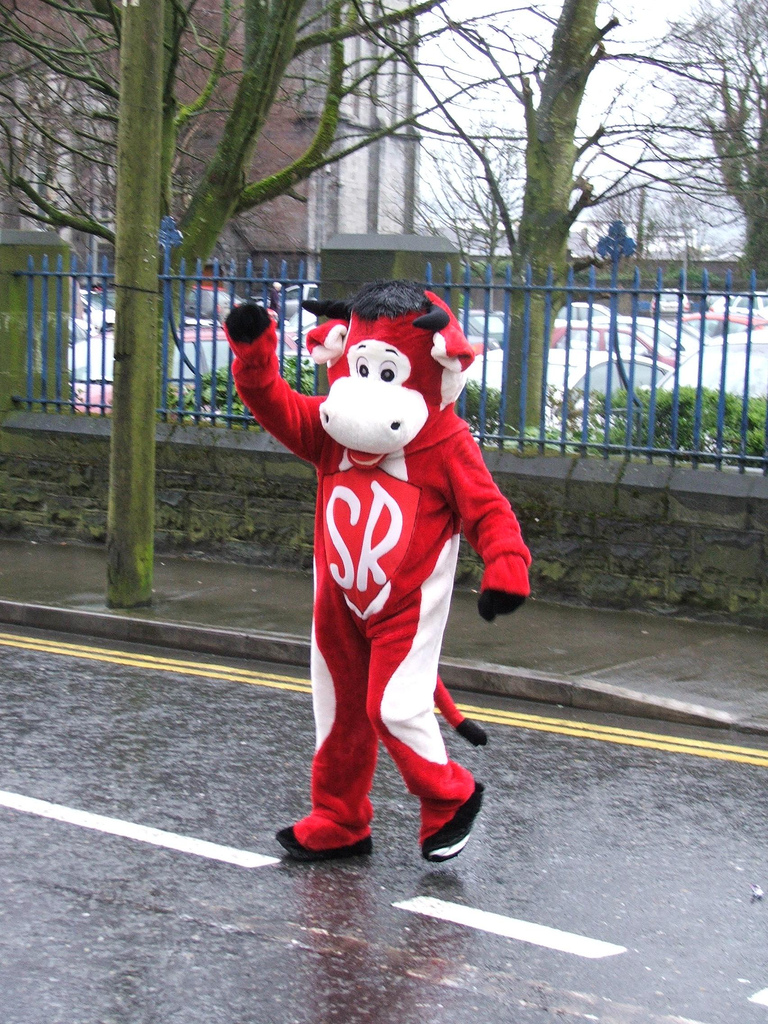
Club Mascot Benny the Bull

Steve Feeney returned as manager of Sligo for 2025 with them opening the season with a goalless draw at home to Bohemians they achieved their first win at home to Peamount United in the Showgrounds a week later they drew with Shamrock Rovers 0-0 in Dublin, American Defender Annie McKinley signed in July ahead of their game away to Connacht rivals Galway, McKinley scored two goals to put Sligo 2-0 up before eventually losing 4-2, August's opening two games against Munster oppositions Waterford and Cork City winning both games 2-0, Sligo suffered a tough 8-0 defeat to Shelbourne in Tolka Park, they finished the season finishing in 10th ahead of Waterford and Cork, Paula McGrory finished as top scorer, Steve Feeney stepped down at the end of the season

The club announced manager Gavin Hughes will take over the club for the 2026 Season. He had previously been managing Bohemians u19 squad. The appointment gave the club a fresh revamp with many signings including Bohs duo Abby Rooney and Kelsey McQuillan, Former academy player Emma Duffy from Galway United and six overseas player Americans Cara Jordan, Ella Karolak, Sydney Stephens, Sabrina Hillyer, Portuguese midfielder Manu Baptista Filipe and American born Korean forward Natalie Yoo. The club opened their season with a draw at home to champions Athlone Town, with an equalizer coming from club captain Emma Hansberry.

Sligo's 2026 season got of to a strong start in their first 10 league games they registered 3 wins and 4 draw including a 5-1 win over Bohemians with a hat-trick from Sydney Stephens, a draw on the opening day at home to champions Athlone Town, a draw with Shelbourne after a penalty saved by Rovers keeper Bonnie McKiernan, as well as wins to Waterford and Cork City, their 2026 All-Island Cup campaign started of with a 2-0 win over Wexford with a brace from Cara Jordan before a 2-0 loss to Shamrock Rovers in Tallaght Stadium and a loss of 5-0 against Linfield in Belfast. Four players departed ahead of the second half of the season with all four had signed at the start of the season those being, Manu Baptista Filipe, Natalie Yoo, Abby Rooney and Kelsey McQuillan.

Top Scorer Sydney Stephens departed the club ahead of the second half of the season, the American-Born striker departed Sligo for Mexican club Atlas signing a contract worth upwards of €42,000 per year the Illinois native scored a total of 11 goals in 15 appearances for the Bit O'Red, Stephens was named Women’s Premier Division Player of the Month for May.

Sligo finished the 2026 season in 7th place with 34 points, Sydney Stephens finished top scorer with 11 goals while Cara Jordan scored 10, Leah Kelly became the first player at the club too reach 100 Appearances and Giovanna Dionicio became the first player to play international football at senior level while at the club when she played for the Dominican Republic.

== Players ==
=== Current squad ===
As of 1 September 2026

Note: Flags indicate national team as defined under FIFA eligibility rules; some limited exceptions apply. Players may hold more than one non-FIFA nationality.

No.	Pos.	Nation	Player
2	DF	IRL	Leah Kelly (vice-captain)
3	DF	IRL	Ava Hallinan
4	MF	IRL	Alana Doherty
5	DF	IRL	Keeva Flynn
6	MF	IRL	Emma Hansberry (captain)
7	FW	USA	Cara Jordan (vice-captain)
8	MF	IRL	Emma Duffy (vice-captain)
10	FW	IRL	Paula McGrory
12	MF	USA	Gracie Dunaway
13	DF	USA	Ella Karolak
15	FW	IRL	Katie Melly
16	MF	IRL	Katie Glynn
18	GK	IRL	Ivana McMahon
19	DF	USA	Sabrina Hillyer
20	DF	IRL	Keela Scanlon

No.	Pos.	Nation	Player
21	MF	USA	Olivia Rush
22	MF	IRL	Sarah McCaffrey
23	MF	IRL	Ciara Henry
24	MF	IRL	Jessica Casey
25	GK	IRL	Bonnie McKiernan
26	DF	IRL	Alice Lillie
33	GK	USA	Emma Malone
37	DF	IRL	Amy McCarthy
42	FW	IRL	Rachel McGoldrick
44	DF	DOM	Giovanna Dionicio
48	FW	IRL	Mairead McIntyre
52	DF	IRL	Kya McKenna
66	DF	IRL	Cara King
88	FW	IRL	Anna McDaniel
94	DF	USA	Haylee Mersereau

== Coaching Staff ==
Name	Role
(Republic of Ireland) Gavin Hughes	Head Coach
(Republic of Ireland) Ciarán Fadden	Assistant Manager
(Republic of Ireland) Tom Donovan	Coach
(England) Richard Brush	Goalkeeping Coach
(Republic of Ireland) Ben Houston	Strength and Conditioning Coach

=== Managerial History ===
Name	Seasons	G	W	D	L	Win %
(Republic of Ireland) Steve Feeney	2022–2023	55	12	5	38	21.8%
(Republic of Ireland) Tommy Hewitt	2024	24	2	5	17	8.33%
(Republic of Ireland) Conor O’Grady (Interim)	2024	2	1	1	0	50%
(Republic of Ireland) Steve Feeney	2025	26	3	4	19	11.54%
(Republic of Ireland) Gavin Hughes	2026–	27	11	7	9	40.74%

As of October 25 2026

== League and cup record ==
League										Coach	FAI Women's Cup	All-Island Cup	Top Goalscorer
Season	Pos.	P	W	D	L	F	A	GD	Pts	Coach	FAI Women's Cup	All-Island Cup	Top Goalscorer
2022	8th	27	6	2	19	32	66	-34	20	Steve Feeney	Quarterfinal	–	(Republic of Ireland) Emma Doherty 12
2023	9th	20	3	2	15	22	54	-32	11	Steve Feeney	Semi Final	Group Stage	(Republic of Ireland) Emma Doherty 12 (Northern Ireland) Casey Howe 12
2024	11th	20	1	6	13	13	41	-28	9	Tommy Hewitt	Semi Final	Group Stage	(Republic of Ireland) Muireann Devaney 4
2025	10th	22	3	3	16	18	60	-42	12	Steve Feeney	Round of 16	Group Stage	(Republic of Ireland) Paula McGrory 5
2026	7th	22	9	7	6	38	33	+5	34	Gavin Hughes	Quarterfinal	Group Stage	(United States) Sydney Stephens 11

== Notable Players ==
=== Internationals ===
- (Republic of Ireland) Emma Hansberry
- (Republic of Ireland) Amy Boyle-Carr
- (Northern Ireland) Casey Howe
- (Northern Ireland) Gemma McGuinness
- (Dominican Republic) Giovanna Dionicio
