= Crossabeg =

Village in County Wexford, Ireland

Crossabeg Na Crosa Beaga (Irish)
- Village
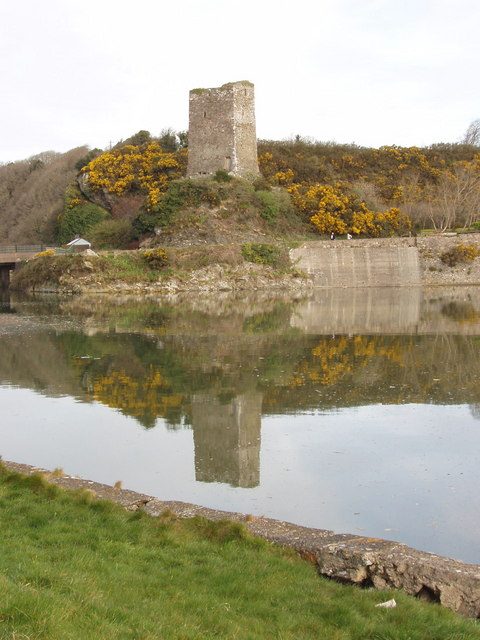
- Ferrycarrig Castle on the northern bank of the River Slaney

- Location in Ireland
- Coordinates: 52°23′02″N 6°30′02″W
- Country: Ireland
- Province: Leinster
- County: Wexford
- Time zone: UTC+0 (WET)
  - Summer (DST): UTC-1 (IST (WEST))
- Area code: 053 91

Crossabeg or Crosabeg (Irish: Na Crosa Beaga, meaning 'small crossroads') is a small village in County Wexford, Ireland, just north of Wexford town. It contains The Forge Storytelling House, Foley's Pub, St Patrick, St Brigid and St Killian's Catholic church with adjoining cemetery and a primary school.

== History ==
Fr James Dixon, the first priest with an official Catholic Church appointment in Australia, ministered in Crossabeg both before and after his time in Australia.

== Sport ==
Established in 1973, Crossabeg A.F.C. have 2 Senior teams and their facilities are located in Newcastle. The facilities include 2 full size junior playing surfaces, 1 under 10 pitch, a grass training pitch and an all weather surface training pitch.

== Facilities ==
Among tourist attractions in Crossabeg are Ferrycarrig Castle and the four-star Ferrycarrig Hotel located in a setting overlooking the River Slaney.

Crossabeg also contains Ferrycarrig Park, home of the League of Ireland First Division team Wexford FC, and Women's National League team Wexford Youths WFC.

== Public transport ==
Wexford Bus route 877 "The Bridge Loop" provides an hourly service to/from Wexford Mondays to Saturdays inclusive.

The nearest railway station is Wexford railway station approximately 9 kilometres distant.

== See also ==
- List of towns and villages in Ireland
