= Greenogue =

Football ground in Newcastle, Ireland

- An Ghrianóg
- Location within Dublin
- Location: College Road, Newcastle, South Dublin, Ireland
- Coordinates: 53.303121°N 6.477413°W
- Owner: Peamount United F.C.
- Surface: grass
- Scoreboard: No
- Field size: 107 × 74.4 yd (97.8 × 68 m)
- Public transit: Newcastle bus stop (Dublin Bus route 68)

Tenant
- Peamount United F.C.

Greenogue (/ˈɡriːnoʊɡ/) is a football ground located in Newcastle, South Dublin, Ireland.

== Location ==
Greenogue is located 1.6 km (0.99 mi) east-northeast of Newcastle, County Dublin and immediately west of Casement Aerodrome.

== Hosts ==
The field at Greenogue is part of the Westmanstown townland. Peamount United F.C. use Greenogue as their home venue in the Women's National League.

== See also ==
- Stadiums of Ireland
- List of association football venues in the Republic of Ireland
