= Athlone Town A.F.C. Ladies =

- Full name: Athlone Town Association Football Club Ladies
- Nickname: The Town
- Founded: 2020; 6 years ago
- Ground: Athlone Town Stadium, Lissywollen, Athlone
- Capacity: 5,000 (2,500 seated)
- Manager: (Republic of Ireland) Lily Agg
- League: Women's Premier Division
- 2025: 1st of 12 (champions)
- Website: athlonetownafc.ie
Home colours	Away colours

Athlone Town Association Football Club Ladies is an Irish association football club based in Athlone. In February 2020, the Football Association of Ireland (FAI) announced the formation of the club as an expansion team for the upcoming 2020 Women's National League season. The senior team plays in the League of Ireland Women's Premier Division, while a junior team competes at Women's Under 17 National League level.

== History ==
In July 2018, Athlone Town were among 11 founding clubs in a new Under-17 Women's National League. In November 2019, the club's application to join the senior Women's National League for the following 2020 season was accepted. The first match was originally scheduled for March 2020, however, the team was made to wait until 15 August 2020 due to the COVID-19 pandemic in the Republic of Ireland which delayed the start of the season. The first game ended in an encouraging 1–0 defeat by Wexford Youths. On 5 September 2020 the club secured their first goals and first win, beating fellow newcomers Treaty United 3–2 with goals from Katelyn Keogh, Paula Doran, and Kellie Brennan. They finished the shortened season joint-sixth of nine teams with a 3–7–1 record.

A separate independent football club named Bealnamulla LFC come from the Athlone area. They reached the national FAI Women's Cup final in 2000, but were beaten 7–0 by Shamrock Rovers, the dominant team of the era. Five members of Athlone Town's inaugural squad were former Bealnamulla players.

Athlone Town won the 2023 FAI Women's Cup Final at Tallaght Stadium on 19 November 2023, beating Shelbourne 4–3 on penalties after drawing 2–2.

Athlone Town won the 2024 Premier Division, with a round of matches to spare, securing a spot in the 2025–26 Champions League preliminary round.

== European record ==
=== Matches ===
Season	Competition	Round	Opponent	Home	Away	Aggregate
2025–26	UEFA Women's Champions League	1QR SF	(Wales) Cardiff City	4–0		
2025–26	UEFA Women's Champions League	1QR F	(Croatia) Agram	3–0		
2025–26	UEFA Women's Champions League	2QR SF	(Iceland) Breiðablik	1–3		
2025–26	UEFA Women's Champions League	2QR 3PPO	(Serbia) Red Star Belgrade	2–0		
2025–26	UEFA Women's Europa Cup	1QR	(Scotland) Glasgow City	0–3	0–3	0–6
2026–27	UEFA Women's Champions League	1QR SF	(North Macedonia) Skopje 2014	4–0		
2026–27	UEFA Women's Champions League	1QR F	(Poland) Czarni Sosnowiec	1–3		

== Honours ==
- League of Ireland Women's Premier Division
  - Champions (3): 2024, 2025, 2026
  - Runners-up (1): 2022
- FAI Women's Cup
  - Winners (2): 2023, 2025
  - Runners-up (3): 2022, 2024, 2026
- Women’s President’s Cup
  - Winners (3): 2023, 2024, 2026

== Players ==
=== Current squad ===
As of 4 July 2026

Note: Flags indicate national team as defined under FIFA eligibility rules; some limited exceptions apply. Players may hold more than one non-FIFA nationality.

No.	Pos.	Nation	Player
1	GK	CYP	Maria Matthaiou
2	DF	IRL	Kellie Brennan
3	DF	IRL	Kayleigh Shine
4	DF	IRL	Shauna Brennan
5	DF	USA	Natalie McNally
6	MF	USA	Hannah Waesch (captain)
7	MF	IRL	Chloe Singleton
8	FW	USA	Dana Scheriff
10	FW	IRL	Noelle Murray
12	FW	IRL	Kerrieanne Brown
13	GK	IRL	Courtney Maguire
14	FW	IRL	Roisin Molloy
15	FW	IRL	Isabel Ryan

No.	Pos.	Nation	Player
16	FW	IRL	Emma Mooney
17	FW	USA	Madie Gibson
18	DF	NIR	Aimee Neal
19	MF	USA	Alexis Strickland
21	FW	IRL	Hazel Donegan
22	MF	IRL	Melissa O'Kane
24	FW	IRL	Muireann Daly
26	MF	IRL	Lucy Fitzgerald
30	DF	ENG	Sofia Stovold
31	MF	IRL	Danielle O'Neill
33	MF	ENG	Phoebe Hampson
51	DF	USA	Kelis Barton

=== Internationals ===
- (Croatia) Antea Guvo
- (Northern Ireland) Casey Howe
- (Cameroon) Brenda Tabe
- (Jamaica) Izzy Groves
- (Nicaragua) Erica Cunningham
- (Greece) Christianna Kiamou
- (Cyprus) Maria Matthaiou
- (Republic of Ireland) Katie Keane
- (Republic of Ireland) Kelly Brady
- (Republic of Ireland) Noelle Murray
