= Ferrycarrig Park =

Stadium in Crossabeg, Wexford, Ireland

- Interactive map of Ferrycarrig Park
- Location: Newcastle, Crossabeg, County Wexford
- Coordinates: 52°21′56″N 6°30′56″W
- Owner: Football Association of Ireland
- Capacity: 2,500 (609 temporary seats)
- Surface: Grass
- Scoreboard: No
- Public transit: Ferrycarrig bus stop (2 km away)

Construction
- Built: 2003
- Opened: 2005

Tenants
- Wexford FC; Wexford WFC

Ferrycarrig Park has been the home of League of Ireland side Wexford Football Club since joining the league in 2007. As of September 2020, the stadium is owned by the Football Association of Ireland (FAI).

The building works for the new stadium and facilities, at Newcastle, Crossabeg, have been ongoing since 2003. Spectator facilities consist of a clubhouse with viewing area and a 609 seater temporary stand. The plans for a permanent stand to seat over 2,000 people are in place. Building work is in progress on a fully equipped gym on the site. An application for retention of developments at the Wexford football complex was rejected by Wexford Planners in October 2007.

== Facilities ==
The single temporary stand fully covers 609 seats and holds both home and away supporters. This stand replaced another un-covered temporary stand, on the opposite (south) side of the ground, from the start of the 2008 season. There are no stands in place behind the goals though there is limited standing space at both ends of the ground. The refreshment stall and supporters club are both found in the north-west corner.

Extra temporary seating was put in place when Wexford hosted the 2008 League Cup Final. Extra stands were put in place on all four sides of the ground.

The large complex in the south-west corner holds the dressing rooms, and also a wine-bar and restaurant.

== Notable matches ==
Ferrycarrig Park hosted the 2008 League Cup final after Wexford Youths won a toss for home advantage in the decider against Derry City FC. A number of alterations to the current set up were made to accommodate live television coverage and a large crowd.

The ground also hosted an Irish UEFA Women's Championship qualifier against Russia, on 21 August 2010. It also serves the purposes of Irish youth national football teams, such as U19 2023 European Championship Elite Round qualifiers versus Slovakia.

== See also ==
- Stadiums of Ireland
