= Shamrock Rovers Ladies F.C. =

Association football club in Tallaght, Ireland

Shamrock Rovers F.C.
- Full name: Shamrock Rovers Football Club
- Nicknames: Hoops, Rovers
- Founded: 1996; 30 years ago
- Ground: Tallaght Stadium
- Capacity: 8,000
- Head Coach: James O'Callaghan
- League: Women's National League
- 2025: 5th
- Website: http://www.shamrockrovers.ie
Home colours	Away colours	Third colours

Shamrock Rovers Football Club is an Irish association football club based in Tallaght, South Dublin.

During the late 1990s and early 2000s, Shamrock Rovers were one of the most successful teams in the Republic of Ireland, winning both the Dublin Women's Soccer League and the FAI Women's Cup five times in a row. In 2002–03 Shamrock Rovers became the first women's team to represent the Republic of Ireland in Europe, and in 2011–12 they were founder members of the Women's National League. In November 2022, it was confirmed that Shamrock Rovers would be re-entering the Women's National League for the 2023 season after a nine-year hiatus.

== History ==
=== 1990s ===
In the early 1990s Denis Power helped establish Castle Rovers FC, a women's football club founded by employees of the Irish civil service. Castle Rovers played in the Dublin Women's Soccer League and were league champions in 1995 and 1996. In 1996 they also won the FAI Women's Cup. In 1996 this club was taken over by Shamrock Rovers. With a team that included Olivia O'Toole, Rovers went on to become one of the leading Republic of Ireland women's football teams during the late 1990s and early 2000s, winning four successive Dublin Women's Soccer League and FAI Women's Cup "doubles" between 1998 and 2001.

=== 2002–03 UEFA Women's Cup ===
25 September 2002

Shamrock Rovers (Republic of Ireland)	3–1	(Croatia) Osijek
O'Toole 5'; O'Neill 48'; Kirwan 65'		Koljenik 33'

Niš

27 September 2002

Masinac Niš (Federal Republic of Yugoslavia)	4–1	(Republic of Ireland) Shamrock Rovers
Vukčević 33'; Mladenović 56'; Stefanović 74', 79'		O'Toole 45'

Niš

29 September 2002

Frankfurt (Germany)	7–1	(Republic of Ireland) Shamrock Rovers
Jones 7', 30'; Wunderlich 26'; Barucha 42'; Woock 62'; Lingor 72'; Meier 86'		O'Toole 21'

Niš

=== 2024 ===
Shamrock Rovers confirmed that 50% of their season ticket sales would be donated to Women's Aid. A charitable foundation that combats domestic abuse.

=== Women's National League ===
In 2011–12, together with Peamount United, Castlebar Celtic, Cork Women's FC, Raheny United and Wexford Youths, Rovers were founder members of the Women's National League (WNL). Rovers played just three seasons in the WNL. In both 2011–12 and 2012–13 they finished bottom of the league and at the end of the 2013–14 season they withdrew.

==== Revival ====
In November 2022 it was confirmed that Rovers' senior women's team would come back ahead of the 2023 season, with former UCD manager Collie O'Neill managing them. That month Áine O'Gorman became their first signing, from Peamount United. They then signed two more from Peamount: first young goalkeeper Summer Lawless, then Alannah McEvoy. On 4 December they signed their first non-Peamount signing, Jessica Hennessey from Athlone Town. On 7 December, four of Rovers' U19 players (Maria Reynolds, Abby Tuthill, Jaime Thompson and Orlaith O'Mahony) were promoted to the WNL team. On 8 December, Rovers announced the signing of the 2014 Puskás Award runner-up and Republic of Ireland international Stephanie Roche.

== Players ==
=== Current squad ===
As of 30 January 2026.

Note: Flags indicate national team as defined under FIFA eligibility rules; some limited exceptions apply. Players may hold more than one non-FIFA nationality.

No.	Pos.	Nation	Player
1	GK	IRL	Amanda Budden
2	DF	IRL	Lauryn O'Callaghan
4	DF	IRL	Therese Kinnevey
5	MF	IRL	Mia Dodd
7	FW	IRL	Katie O'Reilly
8	MF	IRL	Sadhbh Doyle
9	FW	IRL	Emily Corbet
10	MF	IRL	Ellen Molloy
11	FW	IRL	Ella Kelly
14	FW	IRL	Anna Butler

No.	Pos.	Nation	Player
15	DF	IRL	Roisin McGovern
16	GK	IRL	Erica Turner
17	DF	IRL	Keelin Comiskey
20	MF	IRL	Taylor White
21	MF	IRL	Jaime Thompson
28	MF	IRL	Caitlin St. Ledger
35	MF	IRL	Aisling Spillane
51	FW	IRL	Della Cowper Gray
—	GK	IRL	Jayne Merren

=== Notable former coaches ===
- (Republic of Ireland) Synan Braddish
- (Republic of Ireland) Grainne Kierans

== Honours ==
=== Castle Rovers ===
- Dublin Women's Soccer League
  - Winners: 1995, 1996: 2
- FAI Women's Cup
  - Winners: 1996: 1

=== Shamrock Rovers ===
- Dublin Women's Soccer League
  - Winners: 1998, 1999, 2000, 2001, 2002: 5
  - Runners-up: 1997, 2003, 2004: 3
- FAI Women's Cup
  - Winners: 1997, 1998, 1999, 2000, 2001: 5
  - Runners-up: 2002: 1
- All-Island Cup
  - Runners-up: 2024: 1
- DWSL Premier Cup
  - Winners: 1998, 1999, 2000, 2001, 2002: 5
- WNL Cup
  - Runners-up: 2012: 1
