= Treaty United W.F.C. =

Football club in Limerick, Ireland

Treaty United
- Full name: Treaty United W.F.C.
- Founded: 2020
- Ground: Markets Field
- Manager: Laurie Ryan
- League: League of Ireland
- 2025: 8th
Home colours	Away colours

Treaty United Women's Football Club is an Irish association football club based in Limerick. The club was founded in 2020 in the place of Limerick W.F.C. following its financial collapse. It plays in the League of Ireland Premier Division, the top tier of football in Ireland, and plays its home matches at the Markets Field, the same ground as its predecessor.

== History ==
Following the liquidation of Limerick F.C., the idea of a new team in Limerick arose. At first, it was to be called Limerick United but was forced to be changed due to the threat of legal action from Limerick FC, because it had previously had that name. The club name refers to Limerick's nickname of the Treaty City, due to the 1691 Treaty of Limerick and Treaty Stone. Treaty United was confirmed as the name, and the women's team was ready to enter the 2020 Women's National League season and the men's in the 2020 League of Ireland First Division, but the men's team pulled out of the 2020 season. The women's team, however, was ready for the season but had to wait until August because of the COVID-19 pandemic. It started the season on 8 August 2020 against reigning champions Peamount United, losing 5–0.

== Players ==
=== Current squad ===
As of 31 January 2026

Note: Flags indicate national team as defined under FIFA eligibility rules; some limited exceptions apply. Players may hold more than one non-FIFA nationality.

No.	Pos.	Nation	Player
1	GK	USA	Kat Hess
2	DF	IRL	Grace McInerney
3	DF	IRL	Kyah Coady
5	DF	IRL	Clodagh Daly
6	MF	CAN	Emma Oliphant
7	FW	IRL	Ellen Goggin
8	DF	IRL	Kate Jones
9	FW	USA	Caroline Penner
10	MF	IRL	Maddison McGuane
11	FW	IRL	Katie Lawlee
12	MF	IRL	Jodie Griffin
13	DF	IRL	Aibhlinn Cotter

No.	Pos.	Nation	Player
14	MF	IRL	Grace Ehinger
15	MF	IRL	Laura O'Neill
16	MF	IRL	Eva Loftus
18	DF	CAN	Mara McCleary
19	FW	IRL	Ciara Breslin
22	GK	IRL	Ciara Kelly
16	MF	USA	Fiona Doherty
25	DF	USA	Sarah Rice
27	MF	IRL	Aine Walsh
33	MF	IRL	Kristina Bokmane
—	GK	IRL	Amber Hardy

=== Internationals ===
- (Republic of Ireland) Marie Curtin
- (Australia) Eliza Campbell
- Rola Olusola – Ireland Rugby 7s
- Kyah Coady – Ireland Rugby 7s
