= Bohemian F.C. Women =

Bohemians
- Full name: Bohemian Football Club Women
- Nicknames: Bohs; The Gypsies
- Founded: 20 March 2009; 17 years ago
- Ground: Dalymount Park, Phibsborough
- Capacity: 3,640
- Manager: Alan Murphy
- League: League of Ireland Women's Premier Division
- 2025: Women's Premier Division, 7th of 11
- Website: bohemians.ie
Home colours	Away colours	Third colours

Bohemian Football Club Women, more commonly referred to as Bohemians or Bohs, is an Irish association football club based in Dublin, who play in the League of Ireland Women's Premier Division.

The team first formed in 2009 and played in the Dublin Women's Soccer League. The team played out of its home pitch at DCU Sports Grounds in Glasnevin, Dublin.

The team were successful in winning the very first silverware for a Bohemians Women's team by claiming the league title and promotion on their opening season.

In the following 2010 season, the women's team further cemented their status in the game by winning a historic treble of silverware. The team won the DWSL Intermediate Division 1, the DWSL Intermediate Cup and the FAI Women's Junior Cup.

This historic first all Ireland Cup winning title for Bohemians FC Women, was played on 10 October 2010 in Jackman Park, Limerick against Kilmallock Ladies FC. Bohemians won the game 1-0 capping off their year on the field.

In February 2020 the Football Association of Ireland (FAI) announced the formation of the club as an expansion team for the upcoming 2020 Women's National League season. The senior team plays in the Women's National League while a junior team competes at Women's Under 17 National League and Women's Under 19 National League level.

== History ==
Bohemian FC Women's team was first founded in 2009. This was an amateur senior team and played out of DCU Sports Grounds in Glasnevin. They competed in the Dublin Women's Soccer League which was the largest women's league in Ireland, and national cup competitions. Ireland had no national women's league at that time as the Women's National League was still some years away from being formed.

On 27 November 2018, Bohemians were accepted into the Under-17 Women's National League for the 2019 season. Their aim was to grow the number of girls and women members in the club and eventually compete in the Women's National League. The historic first game in the Under-17 Women's National League for Bohemians was played on 13 April 2019 against Cork City and ended in 0–2 defeat.

Just one year after being accepted to compete in the Under-17 Women's National League, Bohemians were accepted to the Women's National League on 18 February 2020. The first match was originally scheduled for 15 March 2020, however, the team was made to wait until 8 August 2020 due to the COVID-19 pandemic in the Republic of Ireland which delayed the start of the season. The game ended in a 4–1 defeat by Wexford Youths. Chloe Darby scored the consolation goal and wrote herself into the history books as Bohemians' first-ever national league goalscorer.

Following a series of narrow defeats, Bohemians' inexperienced side finished bottom of the nine-team table in a truncated 2020 WNL season. In the off-season the club launched a third team to compete in the new Under-19 Women's National League and announced plans to pay first team players' expenses. After finishing sixth in the 2021 WNL season, the club announced that they would play all their 2022 home fixtures at Dalymount Park, instead of at the Oscar Traynor Centre where they had been based previously.

After the 2023 season, Bohemians announced on their website that Sean Byrne and his management team's four year spell at the club had come to an end. On the same day, the club announced Ken Kiernan as the new head coach.

Ken Kiernan resigned at the end of the 2024 season and was replaced by Alban Hysa. Hysa guided Bohs to two cups finals, including the 2025 Women's FAI Cup final, and won the 2025 Manager of the Year award in his first season but stepped down in January 2026. Alan Murphy was announced as the new manager on 11 January 2026 after having previously served as assistant manager for the past two seasons.

== Players ==
=== Current squad ===
As of 6 February 2026

Note: Flags indicate national team as defined under FIFA eligibility rules; some limited exceptions apply. Players may hold more than one non-FIFA nationality.

No.	Pos.	Nation	Player
1	GK	IRL	Rachael Kelly (captain)
3	DF	IRL	Ciara Maher
4	DF	IRL	Lisa Murphy
6	MF	IRL	Fiona Donnelly (vice captain)
7	MF	IRL	Aoibhe Brennan
9	FW	IRL	Alannah McEvoy
10	MF	IRL	Katie Malone
11	MF	IRL	Sarah McKevitt
12	DF	IRL	Sarah Power
14	DF	IRL	Eimear Lafferty
15	DF	IRL	Aoife Brophy

No.	Pos.	Nation	Player
16	FW	IRL	Savannah Kane
17	DF	IRL	Katie Lovely
19	FW	IRL	Shauna Carroll
21	DF	IRL	Robin Baird
22	MF	IRL	Aoife Sheridan
23	DF	IRL	Sophie Clarke
25	MF	IRL	Leiagh Glennon
27	DF	IRL	Alex Devoy
28	MF	IRL	Lauryn McCabe
29	FW	IRL	Hannah O’Brien
32	GK	IRL	Kate Foley

=== Internationals ===
- (Croatia) Antea Guvo

== Management team ==
Position	Staff
Head Coach	(Republic of Ireland) Alan Murphy

== Records ==
- First league title - 2009 DWSL league winners
- League title - 2010 DWSL Intermediate Division 1 winners
- Cup winners - 2010 DWSL Intermediate Cup
- FAI Women's Junior Cup - 2010 winners
- First national league goalscorer Chloe Darby (8 August 2020 vs Wexford Youths in the Women's National League)
