= 2025 Galway United W.F.C. season =

Irish football club season

Galway United
2025 season
- Manager: Phil Trill
- Stadium: Eamonn Deacy Park
- Women's Premier Division: 3rd
- FAI Women's Cup: First Round
- All-Island Cup: Semi-finals
- Top goalscorer: Emma Doherty (13)
- Biggest win: 7–0 v Waterford; 21 June 2025 (Away, Premier Division)
Home colours	Away colours	Third colours

The 2025 Galway United W.F.C. season was the football club's 3rd in the League of Ireland Women's Premier Division since joining the league in 2023.

The club finished the season in 3rd place, replecating their position from the previous season. The club went into the season having won the previous two editions of the All-Island Cup, however this season they would have their worst performance in the tournament to date, losing in the semi-final to eventual winners Wexford.

== Squad ==
#	Name	Nationality	Position	Date of birth (age)	Previous Club	Signed	Notes
Goalkeepers
1	Abbiegayle Ronayne	(Republic of Ireland)	GK	October 27, 2002 (aged 22)	(Republic of Ireland) Galway	2023	
20	Nicole Nix	(Republic of Ireland)	GK	November 2, 2006 (aged 18)	(Republic of Ireland) Wexford	2025	
26	Jayne Merren	(Republic of Ireland)	GK	January 4, 2005 (aged 20)	(Republic of Ireland) Wexford	2025	
45	Lizzy Knight	(England)	GK	October 6, 2000 (aged 25)	(United States) Racing Power	2025	
Defenders
2	Aoibheann Costello	(Republic of Ireland)	DF	October 4, 2004 (aged 21)	(Republic of Ireland) Galway	2023	
3	Lucy-Jayne Grant	(Republic of Ireland)	DF	December 30, 2003 (aged 21)	(Republic of Ireland) Athlone Town	2024	
5	Jamie Erickson	(Canada)	DF	August 18, 1997 (aged 28)	(Republic of Ireland) Galway	2023	
6	Niamh Cotter	(Republic of Ireland)	DF	July 15, 2006 (aged 19)	(Republic of Ireland) Cork City	2025	
13	Kyah Coady	(United States)	DF	August 30, 2002 (aged 23)	(United States) San Jose State Spartans	2025	
14	Therese Kinnevey	(Republic of Ireland)	DF	July 15, 2006 (aged 19)	(Republic of Ireland) Galway	2023	Vice-captain
19	Ava Mullins	(Republic of Ireland)	DF	January 3, 2008 (aged 17)	(Republic of Ireland) Academy	2024	
22	Eve Dossen	(Republic of Ireland)	DF	June 11, 2005 (aged 20)	(Republic of Ireland) Galway	2023	
Midfielders
4	Isabella Beletic	(United States)	MF	July 10, 1998 (aged 27)	(United States) Racing Louisville	2023	
7	Aislinn Meaney	(Republic of Ireland)	MF	October 24, 1998 (aged 26)	(United States) IUP Crimson Hawks	2023	
8	Kate Thompson	(Republic of Ireland)	MF	August 5, 2005 (aged 20)	(Republic of Ireland) Galway	2023	
10	Lynsey McKey	(Republic of Ireland)	MF	March 6, 1990 (aged 35)	(Republic of Ireland) Galway	2023	Captain
11	Aoibhín Donnelly	(Republic of Ireland)	MF	January 2, 2002 (aged 23)	(Republic of Ireland) Cork City	2025	
15	Amy Madden	(Republic of Ireland)	MF	May 1, 2006 (aged 19)	(Republic of Ireland) Treaty United	2023	
16	Abbie Callanan	(Republic of Ireland)	MF	November 25, 2003 (aged 21)	(Republic of Ireland) Galway	2023	
21	Heather Loomes	(Republic of Ireland)	MF	April 11, 2008 (aged 17)	(Republic of Ireland) Knocknacarra	2023	
24	Emma Duffy	(Republic of Ireland)	MF	July 12, 2007 (aged 18)	(Republic of Ireland) Sligo Rovers	2023	
71	Niamh Farrelly	(Republic of Ireland)	MF	April 15, 1999 (aged 26)	(Republic of Ireland) Peamount United	2025	
Forwards
9	Rola Olusola	(Republic of Ireland)	FW	October 16, 2006 (aged 18)	(Republic of Ireland) Galway	2023	
17	Amanda Smith	(Canada)	FW	April 16, 2000 (aged 25)	(Canada) STFX Athletics	2024	
18	Ceola Bergin	(Republic of Ireland)	FW	October 16, 2006 (aged 18)	(Republic of Ireland) Wexford	2025	
23	Emma Doherty	(Republic of Ireland)	FW	April 4, 2004 (aged 21)	(Republic of Ireland) Sligo Rovers	2024	
27	Emily Fitzgerald	(Republic of Ireland)	FW	May 14, 2007 (aged 18)	(Republic of Ireland) Salthill Devon	2025	
28	Anna McGough	(Republic of Ireland)	FW	October 28, 2009 (aged 15)	(Republic of Ireland) Corrib Celtic	2025	
Players who departed before the end of the season (Note: Age shown displays players’ age at the end of the season. For players who departed before the end of the season, age shown is age at time of departure.)
5	Shauna Fox	(Republic of Ireland)	DF	August 20, 1996 (aged 28)	(Republic of Ireland) Shamrock Rovers	2025	
11	Rachel Kearns	(Republic of Ireland)	FW	June 15, 1997 (aged 27)	(Australia) Geelong	2025	
12	Jodie Griffin	(Republic of Ireland)	FW	April 7, 2006 (aged 19)	(Republic of Ireland) Galway	2023	

=== Transfers ===
==== In ====
Date	Position	Nationality	Name	Last club	Ref.
14 January 2025	MF	(Republic of Ireland)	Niamh Farrelly	(Republic of Ireland) Peamount United	
22 January 2025	GK	(Republic of Ireland)	Nicole Nix	(Republic of Ireland) Wexford	
2 February 2025	FW	(Republic of Ireland)	Ceola Bergin	(Republic of Ireland) Wexford	
26 February 2025	GK	(Republic of Ireland)	Jayne Merren	(Republic of Ireland) Wexford	
2 March 2025	FW	(Republic of Ireland)	Rachel Kearns	(Australia) Geelong (Note: Geelong is an Aussie rules club. The most recent soccer team that Kearns had played for was Galway WFC in 2021.)	
6 March 2025	DF	(Republic of Ireland)	Shauna Fox	(Republic of Ireland) Shamrock Rovers	
5 July 2025	MF	(Republic of Ireland)	Aoibhín Donnelly	(Republic of Ireland) Cork City	
10 July 2025	DF	(United States)	Kyah Coady	(United States) San Jose State Spartans	
3 August 2025	DF	(Republic of Ireland)	Niamh Cotter	(Republic of Ireland) Cork City	
8 August 2025	GK	(England)	Lizzy Knight	(United States) Racing Power	

==== Out ====
Date	Position	Nationality	Name	To	Ref.
17 January 2025	GK	(United States)	Jessica Berlin	(Iceland) Þór/KA	
22 January 2025	MF	(Republic of Ireland)	Jenna Slattery	(Scotland) Hearts	
31 January 2025	FW	(Republic of Ireland)	Julie-Ann Russell	Retired	
7 February 2025	FW	(Republic of Ireland)	Róisín Jacob	(Republic of Ireland) Mervue United	
7 February 2025	MF	(Republic of Ireland)	Mary-Kate Tyrell	(Republic of Ireland) Moyne Rangers	
30 June 2025	DF	(Republic of Ireland)	Shauna Fox		
9 July 2025	FW	(Republic of Ireland)	Jodie Griffin	(Republic of Ireland) Cork City	

== Club ==
- Manager: Phil Trill
- Assistant Manager: Adrian Cronin
- First Team Coach: Paul Sinnott
- Goalkeeping Coach: Adrian Cronin
- Assistant Goalkeeping Coach: Patrick Martyn
- Opposition Analyst: Gabriel Darcy
- Technical Coach: Theresa Keane
- Kitman: Marc O’Goill

== Competitions ==
=== League of Ireland Women's Premier Division ===
==== League Table ====
Pos	Team	Pld	W	D	L	GF	GA	GD	Pts	Qualification
1	Athlone Town (C)	22	17	4	1	53	10	+43	55	Qualification for 2026–27 Champions League first round
2	Shelbourne	22	16	0	6	70	25	+45	48	
3	Galway United	22	14	3	5	54	28	+26	45	
4	Wexford	22	13	2	7	40	28	+12	41	
5	Shamrock Rovers	22	11	4	7	51	31	+20	37	
6	Peamount United	22	11	3	8	40	26	+14	36	
7	Bohemians	22	10	5	7	42	34	+8	35	
8	Treaty United	22	10	3	9	34	41	−7	33	
9	DLR Waves	22	5	3	14	25	57	−32	18	
10	Sligo Rovers	22	3	3	16	18	60	−42	12	
11	Waterford	22	4	0	18	20	67	−47	12	
12	Cork City	22	2	2	18	18	58	−40	8	

Source: LeagueOfIreland.ie
(C) Champions

==== Results summary ====
Overall								Home						Away					
Pld	W	D	L	GF	GA	GD	Pts	W	D	L	GF	GA	GD	W	D	L	GF	GA	GD
22	14	3	5	54	28	+26	45	7	2	2	27	15	+12	7	1	3	27	13	+14

==== Matches ====
Win Draw Loss

8 March 2025 1	Galway United	5–1	DLR Waves	Terryland, County Galway
17:00 GMT	Meaney 56', 76'; Doherty 60', 90+1'; Smith 79'	Report	Cosgrove 33' (pen.)	Stadium: Eamonn Deacy Park; Attendance: 316; Referee: Chris Daly

15 March 2025 2	Bohemians	1–3	Galway United	Phibsborough, Dublin 7
15:00 GMT	Healy 2'	Report	Bergin 6'; Thompson 59'; Beletic 75'	Stadium: Dalymount Park; Attendance: 422; Referee: Glen Geraghty

29 March 2025 3	Galway United	3–2	Shamrock Rovers	Terryland, County Galway
17:00 GMT	Callanan 5'; Farrelly 44'; Smith (penalty missed) 78'; Doherty 79'	Report	Corbet 29'; Littlejohn 45'	Stadium: Eamonn Deacy Park; Attendance: 455; Referee: Kate O'Brien

12 April 2025 4	Galway United	1–1	Wexford	Terryland, County Galway
17:00 GMT	Smith 87' (pen.)	Report	Cromack 90+1'	Stadium: Eamonn Deacy Park; Attendance: 388; Referee: Thomas Joyce

19 April 2025 5	Sligo Rovers	1–3	Galway United	Sligo, County Sligo
15:00 GMT	McGoldrick 90+6'	Report	Doherty 3', 80'; Fitzgerald 84'	Stadium: The Showgrounds; Attendance: 240; Referee: Michael Connolly

3 May 2025 6	Galway United	0–3	Athlone Town	Terryland, County Galway
17:00 GMT		Report	Ryan 6'; Gibson 21'; Brennan 39'	Stadium: Eamonn Deacy Park; Attendance: 425; Referee: Claire Purcell

10 May 2025 7	Shelbourne	2–1	Galway United	Drumcondra, Dublin 3
16:00 GMT	Cooke 18', 51'	Report	Olusola 28'	Stadium: Tolka Park; Attendance: 326; Referee: Ian O'Keeffe

17 May 2025 8	Galway United	1–3	Treaty United	Terryland, County Galway
17:00 GMT	Dossen 65'	Report	Flocchini 37', 70'; McGuane 83' (pen.)	Stadium: Eamonn Deacy Park; Attendance: 274; Referee: Ryan Maher

14 June 2025 9	Cork City	2–4	Galway United	Turners Cross, Cork
17:00 GMT	Finnerty 19'; O'Brien 56' (pen.)	Report	Farrelly 26'; Mullins 51'; Griffin 61'; Meaney 90+3'	Stadium: Turners Cross; Attendance: 161; Referee: Ian O'Keeffe

21 June 2025 10	Waterford	0–7	Galway United	Waterford, County Waterford
15:00 GMT		Report	Meaney 30', 49'; Costello 40'; Dossen 56', 60'; Doherty 79'; Smith (penalty missed) 87'; Thompson 90'	Stadium: RSC; Attendance: 276; Referee: Jason Moore

12 July 2025 11	Galway United	4–2	Sligo Rovers	Terryland, County Galway
17:00 GMT	Doherty 49', 63'; Beletic 52'; Smith 85'	Report	McKinley 13', 35'	Stadium: Eamonn Deacy Park; Attendance: 203; Referee: Kate O'Brien

19 July 2025 12	Athlone Town	1–1	Galway United	Lissywollen, Athlone
19:30 GMT	Brady 26'	Report	Meaney 85'	Stadium: Athlone Town Stadium; Attendance: 240; Referee: Claire Purcell

2 August 2025 13	Galway United	1–1	Peamount United	Terryland, County Galway
19:30 GMT	Smith 66'	Report	Ryan-Doyle 32'; Spillane (red card) 45'	Stadium: Eamonn Deacy Park; Attendance: 175; Referee: Daryl Carolan

9 August 2025 14	Shamrock Rovers	1–2	Galway United	Tallaght, Dublin 24
17:00 GMT	Reynolds 38'	Report	Doherty 30'; Erickson 58'	Stadium: Tallaght Stadium; Attendance: 311; Referee: Claire Purcell

23 August 2025 15	Galway United	2–1	Bohemians	Terryland, County Galway
17:00 GMT	Doherty (penalty missed) 45'; Erickson 51'; Smith 90+3'	Report	O'Brien 11'	Stadium: Eamonn Deacy Park; Attendance: 166; Referee: David Dunne

30 August 2025 16	Treaty United	2–1	Galway United	Limerick, County Limerick
15:00 GMT	O'Toole 36' (o.g.); Flocchini 58'; McGuane 79' (pen.)	Report	Erickson (penalty missed) 61'	Stadium: Markets Field; Attendance: 205; Referee: Ian O'Keeffe

6 September 2025 17	Galway United	2–1	Shelbourne	Terryland, County Galway
17:00 GMT	Doherty 47'; Erickson 68'	Report	Anthony 37'	Stadium: Eamonn Deacy Park; Attendance: 191; Referee: Ryan Maher

13 September 2025 18	Peamount United	1–2	Galway United	Newcastle, Dublin 22
17:00 GMT	Ryan-Doyle 45+2'	Report	Bergin 11', 59'	Stadium: Greenogue; Attendance: 80; Referee: Claire Purcell

20 September 2025 19	Galway United	5–0	Cork City	Terryland, County Galway
17:00 GMT	Bergin 20' (pen.), 42'; Erickson 31', 45'; Doherty 90+2'	Report		Stadium: Eamonn Deacy Park; Attendance: 105; Referee: Mark Moynihan

27 September 2025 20	Wexford	1–0	Galway United	Crossabeg, County Wexford
18:00 GMT	Murphy 90+6'	Report		Stadium: Ferrycarrig Park; Attendance: 28; Referee: Ian O'Keeffe

4 October 2025 21	Galway United	3–0	Cork City	Terryland, County Galway
17:30 GMT	Doherty 47', 78'; Smith 90+3'	Report		Stadium: Eamonn Deacy Park; Attendance: 816; Referee: Rob Dowling

11 October 2025 22	DLR Waves	1–3	Galway United	Belfield, Dublin 4
15:00 GMT	Nyangasi 19'	Report	McKey 14'; Smith 16'; Bergin 61'	Stadium: UCD Bowl; Attendance: 130; Referee: Michael Connolly

=== FAI Cup ===
Win Draw Loss

==== First Round ====
28 June 2025 First Round	Shelbourne	2–1	Galway United	Drumcondra, Dublin 3
16:00 GMT	Anthony 47'; Mooney 90'	Report	Smith 57'	Stadium: Tolka Park; Attendance: 509; Referee: Daryl Carolan

=== All-Island Cup ===
Pos	Team	Pld	W	D	L	GF	GA	GD	Pts	Qualification
1	(Republic of Ireland) Galway United	3	2	1	0	5	2	+3	7	Advance to knockout stage
2	(Republic of Ireland) Peamount United	3	1	2	0	4	1	+3	5	Advance to knockout stage
3	(Northern Ireland) Cliftonville	3	0	2	1	4	5	−1	2	
4	(Republic of Ireland) Cork City	3	0	1	2	3	8	−5	1	

Source: Soccerway

Win Draw Loss

==== Group stage ====
26 April 2025 1	Galway United (Republic of Ireland)	2–1	(Northern Ireland) Cliftonville	Terryland, County Galway
15:00 GMT	Fitzgerald 22'; Thompson 90+5'	Report	McGuinness 10'	Stadium: Eamonn Deacy Park; Attendance: 369; Referee: Robert Dowling

24 May 2025 2	Peamount United (Republic of Ireland)	1–1	(Republic of Ireland) Galway United	Newcastle, Dublin 22
17:00 GMT	Doyle 29'	Report	Smith 50'	Stadium: Greenogue; Attendance: 80; Referee: Kate O'Brien

7 June 2025 3	Galway United (Republic of Ireland)	2–0	(Republic of Ireland) Cork City	Headford, County Galway
17:00 GMT	Smith 8'; Beletic 45+3'	Report		Stadium: Moyne Villa; Attendance: 175; Referee: Paudie Hayes

==== Quarter-finals ====
5 July 2025 Quarter-final	Galway United (Republic of Ireland)	3–1	(Republic of Ireland) Shamrock Rovers	Terryland, County Galway
17:00 GMT	Bergin 2', 32'	Report	Lawless 64' (o.g.); Ralph 85'	Stadium: Eamonn Deacy Park; Attendance: 382; Referee: David Dunne

==== Semi-finals ====
26 July 2025 Semi-final	Galway United (Republic of Ireland)	0–1	(Republic of Ireland) Wexford	Terryland, County Galway
17:00 GMT		Report	Molloy 62'	Stadium: Eamonn Deacy Park; Attendance: 353; Referee: John Sconnie Walsh

=== Friendlies ===
Win Draw Loss

==== Pre-season Friendlies ====
15 February 2025	Galway United	1–2	Shelbourne	Headford, County Galway
17:45 GMT	Doherty 60'		Murray 21'; Slattery 63'	Stadium: Presentation Grounds; Referee: Marc Lynch

1 March 2025	Sligo Rovers	2–2	Galway United	Sligo, County Sligo
14:45 GMT	King 42'; McGoldrick 78'		Meaney 60'; Mullins 90'	Stadium: The Showgrounds; Referee: Daniel Corcoran

== Statistics ==
=== Appearances and goals ===
This table shows all of the players who have featured in a first team squad for Galway United this season
Brackets denotes appearances made as a substitute

No.	Pos.	Player	League		FAI Cup		AI Cup		Total	
No.	Pos.	Player	Apps	Goals	Apps	Goals	Apps	Goals	Apps	Goals
1	GK	(Republic of Ireland) Abbiegayle Ronayne	0	0	0	0	0	0	0	0
2	DF	(Republic of Ireland) Aoibheann Costello	22(3)	1	0	0	5(1)	0	27	1
3	DF	(Republic of Ireland) Lucy-Jayne Grant	20	0	1	0	5(1)	0	26	0
4	MF	(United States) Isabella Beletic	21	2	1	0	4	1	26	3
5	DF	(Republic of Ireland) Shauna Fox	4(2)	0	0	0	0	0	4	0
5	DF	(Canada) Jamie Erickson	7	4	0	0	0	0	7	4
6	DF	(Republic of Ireland) Niamh Cotter	2(2)	0	0	0	0	0	2	0
7	MF	(Republic of Ireland) Aislinn Meaney	6(3)	6	1	0	2(1)	0	9	6
8	MF	(Republic of Ireland) Kate Thompson	18(2)	2	1	0	3	1	22	3
9	FW	(Republic of Ireland) Rola Olusola	10(5)	1	1(1)	0	5(4)	2	16	3
10	MF	(Republic of Ireland) Lynsey McKey	9(6)	1	0	0	2(2)	0	11	1
11	FW	(Republic of Ireland) Rachel Kearns	4(4)	0	0	0	1(1)	0	5	0
11	MF	(Republic of Ireland) Aoibhín Donnelly	11(5)	0	0	0	0	0	11	0
12	FW	(Republic of Ireland) Jodie Griffin	9(6)	1	0	0	3(1)	0	12	1
13	DF	(United States) Kyah Coady	1(1)	0	0	0	0	0	1	0
14	DF	(Republic of Ireland) Therese Kinnevey	20(2)	0	1	0	4	0	25	0
15	DF	(Republic of Ireland) Amy Madden	3(1)	0	0	0	0	0	3	0
16	MF	(Republic of Ireland) Abbie Callanan	6(3)	1	0	0	1	0	7	1
17	FW	(Canada) Amanda Smith	19(8)	7	1	1	4	2	24	10
18	FW	(Republic of Ireland) Ceola Bergin	16(2)	5	1(1)	0	2	2	19	7
19	DF	(Republic of Ireland) Ava Mullins	15(5)	1	1	0	5(2)	0	21	1
20	GK	(Republic of Ireland) Nicole Nix	18(1)	0	1	0	5	0	24	0
21	MF	(Republic of Ireland) Heather Loomes	7(3)	0	0	0	2(1)	0	9	0
22	DF	(Republic of Ireland) Eve Dossen	19(1)	3	1	0	5	0	25	3
23	FW	(Republic of Ireland) Emma Doherty	21(1)	13	1	0	5	0	27	13
24	MF	(Republic of Ireland) Emma Duffy	3(3)	0	0	0	1(1)	0	4	0
26	GK	(Republic of Ireland) Jayne Merren	3	0	0	0	0	0	3	0
27	FW	(Republic of Ireland) Emily Fitzgerald	7(5)	1	0	0	4(1)	1	11	2
28	FW	(Republic of Ireland) Anna McGough	4(4)	0	0	0	3(3)	2	7	0
40	GK	(Republic of Ireland) Ella Naughton	0	0	0	0	0	0	0	0
45	GK	(England) Lizzy Knight	2	0	0	0	0	0	2	0
71	MF	(Republic of Ireland) Niamh Farrelly	18(2)	2	1	0	3	0	22	2

=== Clean sheets ===
No.	Player	League	FAI Cup	AI Cup	Total		
No.	Player	20	(Republic of Ireland) Nicole Nix	2	0	1	3
26	(Republic of Ireland) Jayne Merren	0	0	0	0		
45	(England) Lizzy Knight	1	0	0	1		

=== Disciplinary record ===
No.	Player	League			FAI Cup			AI Cup			Total		
No.	Player	Yellow card	(yellow card) (yellow-red card)	Red card	Yellow card	(yellow card) (yellow-red card)	Red card	Yellow card	(yellow card) (yellow-red card)	Red card	Yellow card	(yellow card) (yellow-red card)	Red card
23	Emma Doherty	5	0	0	0	0	0	2	0	0	7	0	0
4	Isabella Beletic	2	0	0	0	0	0	2	0	0	4	0	0
3	Lucy-Jayne Grant	2	0	0	0	0	0	1	0	0	3	0	0
14	Therese Kinnevey	2	0	0	0	0	0	1	0	0	3	0	0
22	Eve Dossen	3	0	0	0	0	0	0	0	0	3	0	0
71	Niamh Farrelly	1	0	0	0	0	0	2	0	0	3	0	0
2	Aoibheann Costello	1	0	0	0	0	0	1	0	0	2	0	0
19	Ava Mullins	2	0	0	0	0	0	0	0	0	2	0	0
7	Aislinn Meaney	0	0	0	0	0	0	1	0	0	1	0	0
11	Rachel Kearns	1	0	0	0	0	0	0	0	0	1	0	0
12	Jodie Griffin	1	0	0	0	0	0	0	0	0	1	0	0
27	Emily Fitzgerald	1	0	0	0	0	0	0	0	0	1	0	0
Totals		21	0	0	0	0	0	10	0	0	31	0	0
