= 2024 Galway United W.F.C. season =

Irish football club season

Galway United
2024 season
- Manager: Phil Trill
- Stadium: Eamonn Deacy Park
- Women's Premier Division: 3rd
- FAI Women's Cup: First Round
- All-Island Cup: Winners
- Top goalscorer: League: Jenna Slattery (10); All: Jenna Slattery (12)
- Highest home attendance: 2,861; 4–0 v DLR Waves; 4 May 2024 (Premier Dvision)
- Biggest win: 5–0 v Cork City; 16 March 2024 (Home, Premier Division)
Home colours	Away colours	Third colours

The 2024 Galway United W.F.C. season was the football club's 2nd in the League of Ireland Women's Premier Division since joining the league in 2023.

The club finished the season in 3rd place, climbing from finishing 4th the previous season. The club went into the season asthe defending champions of the All-Island Cup, having won the first edition of the competition in 2023. The club would win the cup for a second time defeating Shamrock Rovers on penalties at Tallaght Stadium in the final.

== Squad ==
#	Name	Nationality	Position	Date of birth (age)	Previous Club	Signed	Notes
Goalkeepers
1	Kaylee Hammer	(United States)	GK	February 21, 1999 (aged 25)	(United States) Kennesaw State Owls	2024	
20	Jessica Berlin	(United States)	GK	October 11, 1999 (aged 25)	(United States) Seattle Redhawks	2023	
26	Abbiegayle Ronayne	(Republic of Ireland)	GK	October 27, 2002 (aged 21)	(Republic of Ireland) Galway	2023	
Defenders
2	Aoibheann Costello	(Republic of Ireland)	DF	October 4, 2004 (aged 20)	(Republic of Ireland) Galway	2023	
3	Lucy-Jayne Grant	(Republic of Ireland)	DF	December 30, 2003 (aged 20)	(Republic of Ireland) Athlone Town	2024	
5	Jamie Erickson	(Canada)	DF	August 18, 1997 (aged 27)	(Republic of Ireland) Galway	2023	
14	Therese Kinnevey	(Republic of Ireland)	DF	July 15, 2006 (aged 18)	(Republic of Ireland) Galway	2023	Vice-captain
15	Amy Madden	(Republic of Ireland)	DF	May 1, 2006 (aged 18)	(Republic of Ireland) Treaty United	2023	
19	Ava Mullins	(Republic of Ireland)	DF	January 3, 2008 (aged 16)	(Republic of Ireland) Academy	2024	
22	Eve Dossen	(Republic of Ireland)	DF	June 11, 2005 (aged 19)	(Republic of Ireland) Galway	2023	
Midfielders
4	Isabella Beletic	(United States)	MF	July 10, 1998 (aged 26)	(United States) Racing Louisville	2023	
6	Jenna Slattery	(Republic of Ireland)	MF	March 17, 2004 (aged 20)	(Republic of Ireland) Galway	2023	Vice-captain
7	Aislinn Meaney	(Republic of Ireland)	MF	October 24, 1998 (aged 25)	(United States) IUP Crimson Hawks	2023	
8	Kate Thompson	(Republic of Ireland)	MF	August 5, 2005 (aged 19)	(Republic of Ireland) Galway	2023	
10	Lynsey McKey	(Republic of Ireland)	MF	March 6, 1990 (aged 34)	(Republic of Ireland) Galway	2023	Captain
16	Abbie Callanan	(Republic of Ireland)	MF	November 25, 2003 (aged 20)	(Republic of Ireland) Galway	2023	
21	Heather Loomes	(Republic of Ireland)	MF	April 11, 2008 (aged 16)	(Republic of Ireland) Knocknacarra	2023	
24	Emma Duffy	(Republic of Ireland)	MF	July 12, 2007 (aged 17)	(Republic of Ireland) Sligo Rovers	2023	
Forwards
9	Rola Olusola	(Republic of Ireland)	FW	October 16, 2006 (aged 17)	(Republic of Ireland) Galway	2023	
11	Julie-Ann Russell	(Republic of Ireland)	FW	March 28, 1991 (aged 33)	(Republic of Ireland) Galway	2023	
12	Jodie Griffin	(Republic of Ireland)	FW	April 7, 2006 (aged 18)	(Republic of Ireland) Galway	2023	
13	Emily Kavanaugh	(United States)	FW	July 19, 2000 (aged 24)	(United States) Temple Owls	2024	
17	Amanda Smith	(Canada)	FW	April 16, 2000 (aged 24)	(Canada) STFX Athletics	2024	
18	Róisín Jacob	(Republic of Ireland)	FW	January 29, 1997 (aged 27)	(Republic of Ireland) Galway	2023	
25	Emma Doherty	(Republic of Ireland)	FW	April 4, 2004 (aged 20)	(Republic of Ireland) Sligo Rovers	2024	
Players who departed before the end of the season (Note: Age shown displays players’ age at the end of the season. For players who departed before the end of the season, age shown is age at time of departure.)
26	Maria O'Sullivan	(Republic of Ireland)	GK	February 11, 2001 (aged 23)	(Republic of Ireland) Cork City	2024	

=== Transfers ===
==== In ====
Date	Position	Nationality	Name	Last club	Ref.
21 February 2024	FW	(United States)	Emily Kavanaugh	(United States) Temple Owls	
27 February 2024	DF	(Republic of Ireland)	Lucy-Jayne Grant	(Republic of Ireland) Athlone Town	
28 February 2024	GK	(Republic of Ireland)	Maria O'Sullivan	(Republic of Ireland) Cork City	
7 March 2024	GK	(United States)	Kaylee Hammer	(United States) Kennesaw State Owls	
1 May 2024	FW	(Canada)	Amanda Smith	(Canada) STFX Athletics	
5 July 2024	FW	(Republic of Ireland)	Emma Doherty	(Republic of Ireland) Sligo Rovers	

==== Out ====
Date	Position	Nationality	Name	To	Ref.
11 November 2023	DF	(Republic of Ireland)	Orlaith Deasy	(Republic of Ireland) Cork City	
16 August 2024	GK	(Republic of Ireland)	Maria O'Sullivan	(England) Watford	

== Club ==
- Manager: Phil Trill
- Assistant Manager: Adrian Cronin
- First Team Coach: Paul Sinnott
- Goalkeeping Coach: Adrian Cronin
- Assistant Goalkeeping Coach: Patrick Martyn
- Opposition Analyst: Gabriel Darcy
- Technical Coach: Theresa Keane
- Kitman: Marc O’Goill

== Competitions ==
=== League of Ireland Women's Premier Division ===
==== League Table ====
Pos	Team	Pld	W	D	L	GF	GA	GD	Pts	Qualification
1	Athlone Town (C)	20	15	2	3	40	16	+24	47	Secures a spot in the 2025–26 Champions League preliminary round
2	Shelbourne	20	13	6	1	38	9	+29	45	
3	Galway United	20	13	2	5	43	16	+27	41	
4	Wexford FC	20	8	7	5	28	20	+8	31	
5	Shamrock Rovers	20	6	9	5	32	23	+9	27	
6	Peamount United	20	7	5	8	24	26	−2	26	
7	Treaty United	20	7	2	11	23	27	−4	23	
8	Bohemian FC	20	6	4	10	17	32	−15	22	
9	Cork City	20	5	3	12	14	41	−27	18	
10	DLR Waves	20	4	4	12	15	36	−21	16	
11	Sligo Rovers	20	1	6	13	13	41	−28	9	

Source: LeagueOfIreland.ie
(C) Champions

==== Results summary ====
Overall								Home						Away					
Pld	W	D	L	GF	GA	GD	Pts	W	D	L	GF	GA	GD	W	D	L	GF	GA	GD
20	13	2	5	43	16	+27	41	8	0	2	27	8	+19	5	2	3	16	8	+8

==== Matches ====
Win Draw Loss

9 March 2024 1	Athlone Town	0–2	Galway United	Lissywollen, Athlone
19:30 GMT		Report	Slattery 56' (pen.); Dossen 64'	Stadium: Athlone Town Stadium; Attendance: 345; Referee: Michael Connolly

16 March 2024 2	Galway United	5–0	Cork City	Terryland, County Galway
17:30 GMT	Slattery 3', 60' (pen.); Russell 26', 69', 79'	Report		Stadium: Eamonn Deacy Park; Attendance: 203; Referee: Declan Toland

30 March 2024 3	Sligo Rovers	2–3	Galway United	Sligo, County Sligo
19:00 GMT	Doherty 55'; Loughrey 82'	Report	Slattery 20', 89' (pen.); Erickson 69'	Stadium: The Showgrounds; Attendance: 325; Referee: Glen Geraghty

13 April 2024 4	Galway United	4–0	Bohemians	Terryland, County Galway
17:00 GMT	Olusola 12'; McKey 28'; Beletic 33'; Kinnevey 39'; Slattery (penalty missed) 78'	Report		Stadium: Eamonn Deacy Park; Attendance: 612; Referee: Lucas Keating

27 April 2024 5	Peamount United	0–0	Galway United	Newcastle, Dublin 22
17:00 GMT		Report		Stadium: Greenogue; Attendance: 150; Referee: Alan Franklin

4 May 2024 6	Galway United	4–0	DLR Waves	Terryland, County Galway
17:00 GMT	Slattery 22' (pen.); McKey 24'; Erickson 53'; Costello 80'	Report		Stadium: Eamonn Deacy Park; Attendance: 2,861; Referee: Michael Connolly

25 May 2024 7	Shamrock Rovers	0–1	Galway United	Tallaght, Dublin 24
17:35 GMT		Report	Dossen 41'	Stadium: Tallaght Stadium; Attendance: 308; Referee: Aaron O'Dowd

8 June 2024 8	Galway United	1–2	Wexford	Terryland, County Galway
17:00 GMT	Slattery 79' (pen.)	Report	Bergin 86'; Clancy 90' (pen.)	Stadium: Eamonn Deacy Park; Attendance: 210; Referee: Ryan Maher

15 June 2024 9	Shelbourne	1–0	Galway United	Drumcondra, Dublin 3
16:00 GMT	McLaughlin 52'	Report		Stadium: Tolka Park; Attendance: 452; Referee: Ian O'Keeffe

6 July 2024 10	Bohemians	1–0	Galway United	Phibsborough, Dublin 7
15:00 GMT	McEvoy 6'	Report		Stadium: Dalymount Park; Attendance: 409; Referee: Daryl Carolan

10 August 2024 11	Galway United	1–0	Shamrock Rovers	Terryland, County Galway
17:00 GMT	Slattery 56' (pen.)	Report		Stadium: Eamonn Deacy Park; Attendance: 225; Referee: Thomas Joyce

24 August 2024 12	Galway United	3–1	Peamount United	Terryland, County Galway
17:00 GMT	Russell 14', 30'; Doherty 56'	Report	Duggan 90+5'	Stadium: Eamonn Deacy Park; Attendance: 276; Referee: Claire Purcell
Note: Game was originally scheduled for 13 July

31 August 2024 13	Galway United	2–1	Sligo Rovers	Terryland, County Galway
17:00 GMT	Smith 18'; Doherty 53'	Report	McGrory 35'	Stadium: Eamonn Deacy Park; Attendance: 273; Referee: Alan Franklin

4 September 2024 14	Galway United	4–1	Treaty United	Terryland, County Galway
19:30 GMT	Doherty 53'; Russell 37'; Kavanaugh 80'; Slattery 88'	Report	Steer 41'; Van Dolder (yellow card) 43' (yellow-red card) 63'	Stadium: Eamonn Deacy Park; Attendance: 211; Referee: Thomas Joyce
Note: Game was originally scheduled for 29 June, was moved due to the teams playing eachother in the All-Island Cup

7 September 2024 15	Wexford	1–1	Galway United	Crossabeg, County Wexford
19:35 GMT	Murphy 27'; Sinnott 36' (o.g.)	Report	Slattery (penalty missed) 69'	Stadium: Ferrycarrig Park; Attendance: 115; Referee: Alan Patchell

11 September 2024 16	Cork City	2–5	Galway United	Turners Cross, Cork
20:00 GMT	Mangan 33'; Eidson 44'	Report	Olusola 2'; Russell 4', 59'; Kavanaugh 19'; Beletic 65'	Stadium: Turners Cross; Attendance: 116; Referee: Lucas Keating
Note: Game was originally scheduled for 17 August at 14:00, was moved due to Galway United playing in the All-Island Cup final

14 September 2024 17	DLR Waves	0–4	Galway United	Belfield, Dublin 4
15:00 GMT		Report	Erickson 9'; Smith 10'; Kavanaugh 15'; Meaney 77'	Stadium: UCD Bowl; Attendance: 95; Referee: Glen Geraghty

28 September 2024 18	Galway United	0–1	Shelbourne	Terryland, County Galway
16:45 GMT		Report	Mooney 11'	Stadium: Eamonn Deacy Park; Attendance: 1,239; Referee: Ryan Maher

5 October 2024 19	Treaty United	1–0	Galway United	Limerick, County Limerick
17:00 GMT	Steer 72' (pen.)	Report		Stadium: Markets Field; Attendance: 379; Referee: John Hanney

12 October 2024 20	Galway United	3–2	Athlone Town	Terryland, County Galway
16:30 GMT	Russell 20'; Slattery 41'; Dossen 71'	Report	Donegan 56', 90'	Stadium: Eamonn Deacy Park; Attendance: 431; Referee: Lucas Keating

=== FAI Cup ===
Win Draw Loss

==== First Round ====
3 August 2024 First Round	Galway United	1–3	Shelbourne	Terryland, County Galway
19:00 GMT	Meaney 47'	Report	Kavanagh 1'; O'Mahony 74'; Healy 81'	Stadium: Eamonn Deacy Park; Attendance: 316; Referee: Alan Patchell

=== All-Island Cup ===
Pos	Team	Pld	W	D	L	GF	GA	GD	Pts	Qualification
1	(Republic of Ireland) Galway United	3	2	1	0	8	2	+6	7	Advance to knockout stage
2	(Republic of Ireland) Athlone Town	3	2	1	0	9	5	+4	7	Advance to knockout stage
3	(Northern Ireland) Glentoran	3	1	0	2	7	10	−3	3	
4	(Republic of Ireland) Sligo Rovers	3	0	0	3	2	9	−7	0	

Source: Soccerway

Win Draw Loss

==== Group stage ====
23 March 2024 1	Sligo Rovers (Republic of Ireland)	0–2	(Republic of Ireland) Galway United	Sligo, County Sligo
19:00 GMT		Report	Olusola 20', 54'	Stadium: The Showgrounds; Attendance: 283; Referee: Ryan Maher

20 April 2024 2	Galway United (Republic of Ireland)	4–0	(Northern Ireland) Glentoran	Terryland, County Galway
17:00 GMT	Thompson 10'; Slattery 84'; Dossen 89'	Report	Keenan 81' (o.g.)	Stadium: Eamonn Deacy Park; Attendance: 273; Referee: Ryan Maher

18 May 2024 3	Galway United (Republic of Ireland)	2–2	(Republic of Ireland) Athlone Town	Terryland, County Galway
17:00 GMT	Meaney 57'; Griffin 88'	Report	Howe 21'; Slevin 79'	Stadium: Eamonn Deacy Park; Attendance: 227; Referee: Paudie Hayes

==== Quarter-finals ====
29 June 2024 Quarter-final	Galway United (Republic of Ireland)	1–0	(Republic of Ireland) Treaty United	Terryland, County Galway
17:00 GMT	Slattery 54' (pen.)	Report		Stadium: Eamonn Deacy Park; Attendance: 241; Referee: Paudie Hayes

==== Semi-finals ====
24 July 2024 Semi-final	Galway United (Republic of Ireland)	2–2 (4–2 p)	(Republic of Ireland) Wexford	Terryland, County Galway
19:45 GMT	Thompson 39'; Erickson 52'	Report	Murphy 66'; Jarrett 87'	Stadium: Eamonn Deacy Park; Attendance: 613; Referee: Robert Dowling
	Penalties
	Smith (penalty missed); Thompson (penalty scored); Meaney (penalty scored); Grant (penalty scored); Erickson (penalty scored)		(penalty scored) Jarrett; (penalty scored) Murphy; (penalty missed) Molloy; (penalty missed) McGrath

==== Final ====
17 August 2024 Final	Shamrock Rovers (Republic of Ireland)	0–0 (3–4 p)	(Republic of Ireland) Galway United	Tallaght, Dublin 24
19:35 GMT		Report		Stadium: Tallaght Stadium; Attendance: 1,347; Referee: Alan Patchell
	Penalties
	Zambra (penalty scored); O'Gorman (penalty scored); Kelly (penalty scored); Ralph (penalty missed); Herron (penalty missed)		(penalty scored) Kinnevey; (penalty scored) Thompson; (penalty missed) Slattery; (penalty scored) Meaney; (penalty scored) Erickson

=== Friendlies ===
Win Draw Loss

==== Pre-season Friendlies ====
24 February 2024	Treaty United	1–2	Galway United	Limerick, County Limerick
17:00 GMT	Boeckx 80'		Slattery 2', 75' (pen.)	Stadium: Markets Field; Referee: Eoghan O'Shea

2 March 2024	Galway United	1–1	Wexford	Oranmore, County Galway
17:00 GMT	Kinnevey 84'		Tuthill 59'	Stadium: Maree Oranmore; Referee: Paudie Hayes

== Statistics ==
=== Appearances and goals ===
This table shows all of the players who have featured in a first team squad for Galway United this season
Brackets denotes appearances made as a substitute

No.	Pos.	Player	League		FAI Cup		AI Cup		Total	
No.	Pos.	Player	Apps	Goals	Apps	Goals	Apps	Goals	Apps	Goals
1	GK	(United States) Kaylee Hammer	2	0	0	0	0	0	2	0
2	DF	(Republic of Ireland) Aoibheann Costello	14(2)	1	1	0	5(2)	0	20	1
3	DF	(Republic of Ireland) Lucy-Jayne Grant	13(3)	0	1	0	5	1	19	1
4	MF	(United States) Isabella Beletic	19	2	1	0	3	0	23	2
5	DF	(Canada) Jamie Erickson	20	3	1(1)	0	5	2	26	5
6	MF	(Republic of Ireland) Jenna Slattery	19(1)	10	1	0	5	2	25	12
7	MF	(Republic of Ireland) Aislinn Meaney	15(8)	1	1(1)	0	5(3)	2	21	3
8	MF	(Republic of Ireland) Kate Thompson	13(1)	0	1(1)	0	5(1)	3	19	3
9	FW	(Republic of Ireland) Rola Olusola	16(10)	2	1(1)	0	4(1)	2	21	4
10	MF	(Republic of Ireland) Lynsey McKey	13	2	0	0	5(2)	0	18	2
11	FW	(Republic of Ireland) Julie-Ann Russell	19(1)	9	1	0	5	0	25	9
12	FW	(Republic of Ireland) Jodie Griffin	5(4)	0	0	0	4(1)	1	9	1
13	FW	(United States) Emily Kavanaugh	12(5)	3	0	0	3(2)	0	15	3
14	DF	(Republic of Ireland) Therese Kinnevey	17	1	1	0	5(1)	0	23	1
15	DF	(Republic of Ireland) Amy Madden	10(2)	0	0	0	5(2)	0	15	0
16	MF	(Republic of Ireland) Abbie Callanan	9(9)	0	0	0	3(2)	0	12	0
17	FW	(Canada) Amanda Smith	10(4)	2	1	0	4(2)	0	15	2
18	FW	(Republic of Ireland) Róisín Jacob	3(3)	0	0	0	0	0	3	0
19	MF	(Republic of Ireland) Mary-Kate Tyrell	0	0	0	0	1(1)	0	1	0
19	DF	(Republic of Ireland) Ava Mullins	1(1)	0	0	0	0	0	1	0
20	GK	(United States) Jessica Berlin	17	0	1	0	4	0	22	0
21	MF	(Republic of Ireland) Heather Loomes	2(2)	0	0	0	2(2)	0	4	0
22	DF	(Republic of Ireland) Eve Dossen	16	3	1	0	6(1)	1	25	3
24	MF	(Republic of Ireland) Emma Duffy	14(12)	0	1	0	4(1)	0	19	0
25	FW	(Republic of Ireland) Emma Doherty	12(3)	4	1	0	0	0	13	4
26	GK	(Republic of Ireland) Maria O'Sullivan	1	0	0	0	2	0	3	0
26	GK	(Republic of Ireland) Abbiegayle Ronayne	0	0	0	0	0	0	0	0

=== Clean sheets ===
No.	Player	League	FAI Cup	AI Cup	Total		
No.	Player	1	(United States) Kaylee Hammer	0	0	0	0
20	(United States) Jessica Berlin	5	0	2	7		
26	(Republic of Ireland) Maria O'Sullivan	1	0	1	2		

=== Disciplinary record ===
No.	Player	League			FAI Cup			AI Cup			Total		
No.	Player	Yellow card	(yellow card) (yellow-red card)	Red card	Yellow card	(yellow card) (yellow-red card)	Red card	Yellow card	(yellow card) (yellow-red card)	Red card	Yellow card	(yellow card) (yellow-red card)	Red card
6	Jenna Slattery	6	0	0	0	0	0	2	0	0	8	0	0
22	Eve Dossen	4	0	0	1	0	0	1	0	0	6	0	0
4	Isabella Beletic	3	0	0	0	0	0	1	0	0	4	0	0
9	Rola Olusola	2	0	0	0	0	0	1	0	0	3	0	0
11	Julie-Ann Russell	2	0	0	0	0	0	1	0	0	3	0	0
24	Emma Duffy	2	0	0	0	0	0	0	0	0	2	0	0
3	Lucy-Jayne Grant	0	0	0	0	0	0	1	0	0	1	0	0
7	Aislinn Meaney	0	0	0	0	0	0	1	0	0	1	0	0
12	Jodie Griffin	0	0	0	0	0	0	1	0	0	1	0	0
14	Therese Kinnevey	1	0	0	0	0	0	0	0	0	1	0	0
15	Amy Madden	0	0	0	0	0	0	1	0	0	1	0	0
Totals		20	0	0	1	0	0	10	0	0	31	0	0
