= 2026 Galway United W.F.C. season =

Irish football club season

Galway United
2026 season
- Galway United after their draw with Shelbourne on the final day of the season
- Manager: Phil Trill
- Stadium: Eamonn Deacy Park; Moyne Villa; Maree Oranmore
- Women's Premier Division: 3rd
- FAI Women's Cup: Semi-finals
- All-Island Cup: Runners-up
- Top goalscorer: League: Emma Doherty (12); All: Emma Doherty (16)
- Biggest win: 4–0 v Peamount United; 4 April 2026 (Home, All-Island Cup)
- Biggest defeat: 0–3 v Wexford; 26 September 2026 (Away, Premier Division)
Home colours	Away colours

The 2026 Galway United W.F.C. season was the football club's 4th in the League of Ireland Women's Premier Division since joining the league in 2023.

As a result of drainage work at the club’s usual home Eamonn Deacy Park during the season, the club played some of their home games at Moyne Villa in Headford.

The club finished the season in 3rd for the third season in a row. The club also made it to the FAI Cup semi-final for the first time, where they were eliminated on penalties against Athlone Town.

During the season the club made it to their third All-Island Cup final in four years, where they lost to Shelbourne in the final at Tolka Park on 18 July, ending the club's 17 game unbeaten run that season.

== Squad ==
#	Name	Nationality	Position	Date of birth (age)	Previous Club	Signed	Notes
Goalkeepers
1	Nicole Nix	(Republic of Ireland)	GK	November 2, 2006 (aged 19)	(Republic of Ireland) Wexford	2025	
30	Amanda McQuillan	(Republic of Ireland)	GK	March 24, 1998 (aged 28)	(Republic of Ireland) Shelbourne	2026	
Defenders
2	Aoibheann Costello	(Republic of Ireland)	DF	October 4, 2004 (aged 22)	(Republic of Ireland) Galway	2023	Vice-captain
3	Lucy-Jayne Grant	(Northern Ireland)	DF	December 30, 2003 (aged 22)	(Republic of Ireland) Athlone Town	2024	
5	Remini Tillotson	(United States)	DF	June 30, 2004 (aged 22)	(United States) Michigan State	2026	
6	Niamh Cotter	(Republic of Ireland)	DF	July 15, 2006 (aged 20)	(Republic of Ireland) Cork City	2025	
12	Ella Raimondi	(United States)	DF	June 3, 2004 (aged 22)	(United States) Dayton Flyers	2026	
15	Amy Madden	(Republic of Ireland)	DF	May 1, 2006 (aged 20)	(Republic of Ireland) Treaty United	2023	
19	Ava Mullins	(Republic of Ireland)	DF	January 3, 2008 (aged 18)	(Republic of Ireland) Academy	2024	
20	Jade Rehberger	(United States)	DF	November 26, 2003 (aged 22)	(United States) Illinois State Redbirds	2026	
22	Eve Dossen	(Republic of Ireland)	DF	June 11, 2005 (aged 21)	(Republic of Ireland) Galway	2023	
Midfielders
4	Isabella Beletic	(United States)	MF	July 10, 1998 (aged 28)	(United States) Racing Louisville	2023	
7	Aislinn Meaney	(Republic of Ireland)	MF	October 24, 1998 (aged 28)	(United States) IUP Crimson Hawks	2023	
8	Kate Thompson	(Republic of Ireland)	MF	August 5, 2005 (aged 21)	(Republic of Ireland) Galway	2023	
10	Lynsey McKey	(Republic of Ireland)	MF	March 6, 1990 (aged 36)	(Republic of Ireland) Galway	2023	Captain
11	Aoibhín Donnelly	(Republic of Ireland)	MF	January 2, 2002 (aged 24)	(Republic of Ireland) Cork City	2025	
13	Cara Griffin	(Republic of Ireland)	MF	June 12, 2000 (aged 26)	(Republic of Ireland) Treaty United	2026	
14	Roma McLaughlin	(Republic of Ireland)	MF	March 6, 1998 (aged 28)	(Republic of Ireland) Athlone Town	2026	
16	Abbie Callanan	(Republic of Ireland)	MF	November 25, 2003 (aged 22)	(Republic of Ireland) Galway	2023	
17	Amy Tierney	(Republic of Ireland)	MF	July 17, 2007 (aged 19)	(Republic of Ireland) Treaty United	2026	
21	Heather Loomes	(Republic of Ireland)	MF	April 11, 2008 (aged 18)	(Republic of Ireland) Knocknacarra	2023	
71	Niamh Farrelly	(Republic of Ireland)	MF	April 15, 1999 (aged 27)	(Republic of Ireland) Peamount United	2025	
Forwards
9	Ceola Bergin	(Republic of Ireland)	FW	October 16, 2006 (aged 20)	(Republic of Ireland) Wexford	2025	
18	Anna McGough	(Republic of Ireland)	FW	October 28, 2009 (aged 16)	(Republic of Ireland) Corrib Celtic	2025	
23	Emma Doherty	(Republic of Ireland)	FW	April 4, 2004 (aged 22)	(Republic of Ireland) Sligo Rovers	2024	
27	Emily Fitzgerald	(Republic of Ireland)	FW	May 14, 2007 (aged 19)	(Republic of Ireland) Salthill Devon	2025	
Players who departed before the end of the season (Note: Age shown displays players’ age at the end of the season. For players who departed before the end of the season, age shown is age at time of departure.)
26	Jayne Merren	(Republic of Ireland)	GK	January 4, 2005 (aged 21)	(Republic of Ireland) Wexford	2025	

=== Transfers ===
==== In ====
Date	Position	Nationality	Name	Last club	Ref.
22 December 2025	GK	(Republic of Ireland)	Amanda McQuillan	(Republic of Ireland) Shelbourne	
7 February 2026	MF	(Republic of Ireland)	Amy Tierney	(Republic of Ireland) Treaty United	
7 February 2026	MF	(Republic of Ireland)	Cara Griffin	(Republic of Ireland) Treaty United	
25 February 2026	DF	(United States)	Remini Tillotson	(United States) Michigan State	
10 March 2026	MF	(Republic of Ireland)	Roma McLaughlin	(Republic of Ireland) Athlone Town	
4 August 2026	DF	(United States)	Ella Raimondi	(United States) Dayton Flyers	
12 August 2026	DF	(United States)	Jade Rehberger	(United States) Illinois State Redbirds	

==== Out ====
Date	Position	Nationality	Name	To	Ref.
11 September 2025	GK	(Republic of Ireland)	Abbiegayle Ronayne		
11 September 2025	MF	(Republic of Ireland)	Emma Duffy	(Republic of Ireland) Sligo Rovers	
29 December 2025	FW	(Republic of Ireland)	Rola Olusola	(Republic of Ireland) Treaty United	
5 January 2026	DF	(Republic of Ireland)	Therese Kinnevey	(Republic of Ireland) Shamrock Rovers	
15 January 2026	DF	(United States)	Kyah Coady	(Republic of Ireland) Treaty United	
7 February 2026	FW	(Canada)	Amanda Smith	(Canada) STFX Athletics (Note: Smith has become a head coach for the St. Francis Xavier University's women's soccer team)	
7 February 2026	DF	(Canada)	Jamie Erickson		
12 March 2026	GK	(England)	Lizzy Knight	(England) Sutton United	
31 July 2026	GK	(Republic of Ireland)	Jayne Merren	(Republic of Ireland) Shamrock Rovers	

== Club ==
- Manager: Phil Trill
- Assistant Manager: Adrian Cronin
- First Team Coach: Paul Sinnott (–17 June) (Note: On 17 June Sinnott was announced as a coach for Mervue United)
- Goalkeeping Coach: Adrian Cronin
- Technical Coach: Theresa Keane
- Kitman: Marc O’Goill

== Competitions ==
=== League of Ireland Women's Premier Division ===
==== League Table ====
Pos	Team	Pld	W	D	L	GF	GA	GD	Pts	
1	Athlone Town	22	17	4	1	52	17	+35	55	Qualification for the Champions League second qualifying round
2	Shelbourne	22	12	7	3	43	22	+21	43	Qualification for the Europa Cup first qualifying round
3	Galway United	22	12	7	3	31	19	+12	43	
4	Shamrock Rovers	22	12	4	6	45	25	+20	40	
5	Wexford	22	10	6	6	42	27	+15	36	

Source: League of Ireland
Rules for classification: 1) Points; 2) Goal difference; 3) Goals scored.

==== Results summary ====
Overall								Home						Away					
Pld	W	D	L	GF	GA	GD	Pts	W	D	L	GF	GA	GD	W	D	L	GF	GA	GD
22	12	7	3	31	19	+12	43	6	4	1	19	13	+6	6	3	2	12	6	+6

Last updated: 25 October 2026.

==== Results by round ====
Round	1	2	3	4	5	6	7	8	9	10	11	12	13	14	15	16	17	18	19	20	21	22
Ground	A	H	H	A	A	H	A	H	H	H	H	A	A	A	H	H	A	H	A	A	A	H
Result	W	W	W	W	W	W	D	W	D	D	W	L	D	W	W	D	W	L	L	D	W	D
Position	3	1	1	1	1	1	2	1	1	2	2	2	3	3	3	3	3	3	3	3	3	3

Updated to match(es) played on 25 October 2026. Source: 2026 League of Ireland Women's Premier Division
A = Away; H = Home; W = Win; D = Draw; L = Loss

==== Matches ====
Win Draw Loss

14 March 2026 1	DLR Waves	0–1	Galway United	Belfield, Dublin 4
15:00 GMT	Cosgrove (yellow card) 45+2'; Lawless (yellow card) 79'; Muddiman (yellow card) 90+1'	Report	Bergin (yellow card) 67'; Beletic 73'; Costello (yellow card) 77'; Doherty (yellow card) 81'	Stadium: UCD Bowl; Attendance: 115; Referee: Mark Patchell

21 March 2026 2	Galway United	2–1	Sligo Rovers	Terryland, County Galway
17:00 GMT	Bergin 45' (pen.) 56' (pen.)	Report	Stephens 7'; McQuillan (yellow card) 30'; McKiernan (yellow card) 44'; Kelly (yellow card) 90'	Stadium: Eamonn Deacy Park; Attendance: 221; Referee: Chris Sheehan

28 March 2026 3	Galway United	2–1	Wexford	Terryland, County Galway
17:00 GMT	Tierney (yellow card) 10'; Costello 53'; Farrelly (yellow card) 73'; Doherty 85'	Report	De Mange (yellow card) 11' (yellow-red card) 61'; Smyth-Lynch 30'; Rossiter (yellow card) 32'	Stadium: Eamonn Deacy Park; Attendance: 208; Referee: Ryan Maher

19 April 2026 4	Treaty United	0–2	Galway United	Limerick, County Limerick
13:45 GMT	Walsh (yellow card) 81'	Report	Bergin 26' (yellow card) 40'; Doherty 57'	Stadium: Markets Field; Referee: Ian O'Keefe
Note: Live on TG4

25 April 2026 5	Cork City	0–3	Galway United	Turners Cross, Cork
15:00 GMT		Report	Donnelly (yellow card) 25'; Doherty 35', 49', 55'; Bergin (penalty missed) 85'	Stadium: Turners Cross; Attendance: 103; Referee: Chris Sheehan

2 May 2026 6	Galway United	2–1	Peamount United	Terryland, County Galway
17:00 GMT	Doherty 27' (yellow card) 73'; Costello 54'; Tillotson (yellow card) 72'; Bergin (yellow card) 90+1'	Report	Ryan-Doyle 14'; Spillane (yellow card) 26'	Stadium: Eamonn Deacy Park; Attendance: 218; Referee: Eric Eaton

16 May 2026 7	Shelbourne	0–0	Galway United	Drumcondra, Dublin 3
16:00 GMT	Kelly (yellow card) 23'	Report	Beletic (yellow card) 37'; Tillotson (yellow card) 50'; Madden (yellow card) 90+3'	Stadium: Tolka Park; Attendance: 329; Referee: Oliver Moran

23 May 2026 8	Galway United	2–1	Athlone Town	Terryland, County Galway
17:00 GMT	Tillotson 88' (yellow card) 88'; Thompson (yellow card) 90'; Farrelly 90+3'; McQuillan (yellow card) 90+4'	Report	Strickland 43'; Brennan (red card) 67'	Stadium: Eamonn Deacy Park; Attendance: 925; Referee: Glen Geraghty

20 June 2026 9	Galway United	1–1	Waterford	Headford, County Galway
17:00 GMT	Griffin 31'; Loomes (yellow card) 80'; Cotter (yellow card) 89'	Report	Burke (yellow card) 64'; Lenihan 81'	Stadium: Moyne Villa; Attendance: 121; Referee: Paudie Hayes

12 July 2026 10	Galway United	3–3	Shamrock Rovers	Headford, County Galway
16:00 GMT	Doherty 3'; Callanan 18'; Dossen 30'; Farrelly (yellow card) 87'	Report	Doyle 37'; Corbet 47', 74' (pen.); McGovern (yellow card) 58'	Stadium: Moyne Villa; Attendance: 125; Referee: Ryan Maher
Note: Game was originally scheduled for 15:00 GMT, it was moved at the request of Galway United

26 July 2026 11	Galway United	2–0	DLR Waves	Headford, County Galway
15:00 GMT	Doherty 80'; Beletic 83'	Report	Conheady (yellow card) 68'; Tobin-Jones (yellow card) 79'	Stadium: Moyne Villa; Attendance: 75; Referee: Alan Franklin

4 August 2026 12	Bohemians	1–0	Galway United	Phibsborough, Dublin 7
15:00 GMT	O'Brien (yellow card) 18'; Kane (yellow card) 79' (goal) 90'; Donnelly (yellow card) 90+4'	Report	Tillotson (red card) 54'	Stadium: Dalymount Park; Referee: Sam Ralph
Note: Game was originally schedueled for 27 June, the game was postponed due to both teams' participation in the All-Island Cup.

8 August 2026 13	Sligo Rovers	1–1	Galway United	Sligo, County Sligo
17:00 GMT	Rush (yellow card) 22'; Dunaway 26'; Duffy (yellow card) 34'; Lillie (yellow card) 88'	Report	Cotter (yellow card) 41'; Doherty 51'	Stadium: The Showgrounds; Attendance: 247; Referee: Michael Connolly

15 August 2026 14	Waterford	0–2	Galway United	Waterford, County Waterford
15:00 GMT	Lenihan (yellow card) 30'; Conroy (yellow card) 37'	Report	Costello 7'; Doherty 26'; Donnelly (yellow card) 90+1'	Stadium: RSC; Attendance: 123; Referee: Ian O'Keeffe

29 August 2026 15	Galway United	3–2	Cork City	Terryland, County Galway
17:00 GMT	Callanan 32'; Beletic 53'; Grant 71'	Report	Berezowski 11'; Go 16'; O'Brien (yellow card) 30'; Mangan (yellow card) 42'; Homan (yellow card) 48'	Stadium: Eamonn Deacy Park; Attendance: 283; Referee: Alan Franklin

5 September 2026 16	Galway United	0–0	Treaty United	Terryland, County Galway
17:00 GMT	Costello (yellow card) 10'; Beletic (yellow card) 81'	Report		Stadium: Eamonn Deacy Park; Attendance: 131; Referee: Ryan Maher

12 September 2026 17	Shamrock Rovers	0–1	Galway United	Tallaght, Dublin 24
15:00 GMT	Butler (yellow card) 37'; Doyle (yellow card) 44'	Report	Farrelly (yellow card) 12'; Doherty 64'	Stadium: Tallaght Stadium; Attendance: 110; Referee: Mark Patchell

19 September 2026 18	Galway United	0–1	Bohemians	Terryland, County Galway
17:00 GMT		Report	Kane 32'; Power (yellow card) 45+1'; Glennon (yellow card) 90+3'	Stadium: Eamonn Deacy Park; Attendance: 281; Referee: Michael Connolly

26 September 2026 19	Wexford	3–0	Galway United	Crossabeg, County Wexford
18:00 GMT	Olive 6', 26'; Rossiter (yellow card) 31'; Walsh (yellow card) 38'; Roche 59'; Gray (yellow card) 65'	Report		Stadium: Ferrycarrig Park; Attendance: 101; Referee: Mark Houlihan
Note: Game was originally scheduled for 18 July, but was postponed due to Galway United's participation in the All-Island Cup final

3 October 2026 20	Athlone Town	0–0	Galway United	Lissywollen, Athlone
16:30 GMT	Molloy (yellow card) 28'; Brennan (yellow card) 55'	Report		Stadium: Athlone Town Stadium; Attendance: 510; Referee: Daryl Carolan
Note: Kick Off was originally scheduled for 19:30 GMT

17 October 2026 21	Peamount United	1–2	Galway United	Newcastle, Dublin 22
17:00 GMT	Daly 41'; Tuthill (yellow card) 84'	Report	Costello 47'; Grant (yellow card) 51'; Doherty 54'; Cotter (yellow card) 70'	Stadium: Greenogue; Attendance: 100; Referee: Eric Eaton

25 October 2026 22	Galway United	2–2	Shelbourne	Terryland, County Galway
15:00 GMT	Rehberger (yellow card) 9'; Dossen (yellow card) 55'; Donnelly (yellow card) 64'; Doherty (yellow card) 75' (goal) 90' (pen.); Farrelly (yellow card) 87'; Grant 90+5'	Report	Kavanagh 29' (yellow card) 63'; Flocchini 41'; Slattery (yellow card) 73'; Pierce (yellow card) 90+4'; Sanchez (yellow card) 90+5'	Stadium: Eamonn Deacy Park; Attendance: 721; Referee: Mark Patchell
Note: Originally scheduled for 24 October at 16:35, the game was moved due to an orange weather warning

=== FAI Cup ===
Win Draw Loss

==== First Round ====
4 July 2026 First Round	Galway United	1–0	Treaty United	Headford, County Galway
17:00	Doherty 7' (yellow card) 80'	Report	McInerney (yellow card) 67'	Stadium: Moyne Villa; Attendance: 103; Referee: Alan Franklin

==== Quarter-final ====
1 August 2026 Quarter-final	Galway United	2–1 (a.e.t.)	Sligo Rovers	Headford, County Galway
17:00	Costello (yellow card) 66'; Doherty 96', 113'	Report	Hillyer (yellow card) 34'; Hallinan (yellow card) 80'; McGrory 116'	Stadium: Moyne Villa; Attendance: 121; Referee: Mark Patchell

==== Semi-final ====
22 August 2026 Semi-final	Athlone Town	1–1 (a.e.t.) (4–3 p)	Galway United	Lissywollen, Athlone
19:35	Strickland 9'	Report	Griffin 70'; Dossen (yellow card) 104'	Stadium: Athlone Town Stadium; Attendance: 654; Referee: Oliver Moran
	Penalties
	Waesch (penalty scored); Donegan (penalty scored); Molloy (penalty scored); Brown (penalty scored)		Grant (penalty scored); Dossen (penalty scored); Beletic (penalty missed); McGough (penalty scored); Farrelly (penalty missed)
Note: Game was broadcast on TG4

=== All-Island Cup ===
Pos	Team	Pld	W	D	L	GF	GA	GD	Pts	Qualification
1	(Republic of Ireland) Galway United	3	3	0	0	10	1	+9	9	Advance to knockout stage
2	(Republic of Ireland) Peamount United	3	2	0	1	11	5	+6	6	Advance to knockout stage
3	(Republic of Ireland) DLR Waves	3	1	0	2	1	7	−6	3	
4	(Northern Ireland) Lisburn Rangers	3	0	0	3	2	11	−9	0	

Source: Soccerway

Win Draw Loss

==== Group stage ====
4 April 2026 1	Galway United (Republic of Ireland)	4–0	(Republic of Ireland) Peamount United	Terryland, County Galway
17:00 GMT	Cotter (yellow card) 3'; Bergin 13' (pen.), 44'; Donnelly 38'; Costello 69'	Report	Glackin (yellow card) 12'; Russell (yellow card) 53'; Doherty (yellow card) 70'	Stadium: Eamonn Deacy Park; Attendance: 151; Referee: Shane O'Donoghue

10 May 2026 2	Lisburn Rangers (Northern Ireland)	1–4	(Republic of Ireland) Galway United	Glenavy, County Antrim
15:00 GMT	Dickson 7'; Keenan (yellow card) 23'	Report	Donnelly 2', 13', 59'; Thompson 44'	Stadium: Crewe Park; Referee: Jack Evans

30 May 2026 3	Galway United (Republic of Ireland)	2–0	(Republic of Ireland) DLR Waves	Oranmore, County Galway
17:00 GMT	McKey 16'; Donnelly (yellow card) 53' (goal) 65'	Report	Peare (yellow card) 31'	Stadium: Maree Oranmore; Attendance: 172; Referee: Shane O'Donoghue
Note: The game was moved to Maree Oranmore, as a result of works being done at Eamonn Deacy Park

==== Quarter-finals ====
13 June 2026 Quarter-final	Galway United (Republic of Ireland)	3–2	(Northern Ireland) Linfield	Headford, County Galway
17:00 GMT	Beletic 50'; McGough 80'; Doherty 90+1'	Report	McMaster (yellow card) 8'; Chambers (yellow card) 23' (goal) 84'; Bell 36'; McKnight (yellow card) 41'; Sweetlove (red card) 81'	Stadium: Moyne Villa; Attendance: 142; Referee: Mark Patchell

==== Semi-finals ====
27 June 2026 Semi-final	Galway United (Republic of Ireland)	1–1 (5–3 p)	(Republic of Ireland) Peamount United	Headford, County Galway
17:00 GMT	McGough 90+2'	Report	Russell (yellow card) 17'; Melia 38'	Stadium: Moyne Villa; Attendance: 81; Referee: Ryan Maher
	Penalties
	McQuillan (penalty scored); Thompson (penalty scored); Doherty (penalty scored); Grant (penalty scored); Farrelly (penalty scored)		(penalty scored) Healy; (penalty missed) Byrne; (penalty scored) Spillane; (penalty scored) O'Connor

==== Final ====
18 July 2026 Final	Shelbourne (Republic of Ireland)	2–0	(Republic of Ireland) Galway United	Drumcondra, Dublin 3
19:25 GMT	Kelly (yellow card) 22'; Watkins 53'; Slattery 76'	Report	McQuillan (red card) 77'	Stadium: Tolka Park; Attendance: 1,368; Referee: Glen Geraghty
Note: Game was broadcast on TG4

=== Friendlies ===
Win Draw Loss

==== Pre-season Friendlies ====
14 February 2026	Galway United	2–0	Bohemians	Headford, County Galway
16:30 GMT	Costello 20', 40'			Stadium: Presentation Grounds; Referee: Christopher Daly

21 February 2026	Treaty United	2–0	Galway United	Limerick, County Limerick
14:45 GMT	Lawlee 3' (yellow card) 41'; Jones 35'			Stadium: Moylish Park; Referee: Paudie Hayes

28 February 2026	Cork City	0–2	Galway United	Killarney, County Kerry
16:00 GMT			Beletic 5'; Doherty 45'	Stadium: Killarney Athletic; Referee: Thomas Sheehy

== Statistics ==
=== Player of the month ===
==== Galway United POTM ====
Awarded monthly to the player that was chosen by members of Galway United Co Op

Month	Player	Ref.
March	(Republic of Ireland) Ceola Bergin	
April	(Republic of Ireland) Emma Doherty	
May	(United States) Remini Tillotson	
June	(Republic of Ireland) Anna McGough	
July	(Republic of Ireland) Emma Doherty	
August	(United States) Isabella Beletic	

=== Appearances and goals ===
This table shows all of the players who have featured in a first team squad for Galway United this season
Brackets denotes appearances made as a substitute

No.	Pos.	Player	League		FAI Cup		All-Island Cup		Total	
No.	Pos.	Player	Apps	Goals	Apps	Goals	Apps	Goals	Apps	Goals
1	GK	(Republic of Ireland) Nicole Nix	2	0	1	0	4(1)	0	7	0
2	DF	(Republic of Ireland) Aoibheann Costello	22(2)	4	3	0	4	1	29	5
3	DF	(Northern Ireland) Lucy-Jayne Grant	20(1)	2	3	0	6	0	29	2
4	MF	(United States) Isabella Beletic	22	3	3	0	6(2)	1	31	4
5	DF	(United States) Remini Tillotson	9	1	1	0	4(2)	0	13	1
6	DF	(Republic of Ireland) Niamh Cotter	10	0	2	0	6	0	18	0
7	MF	(Republic of Ireland) Aislinn Meaney	10(6)	0	3(2)	0	2(2)	0	15	0
8	MF	(Republic of Ireland) Kate Thompson	6(1)	0	0	0	4(1)	1	10	1
9	FW	(Republic of Ireland) Ceola Bergin	7	3	0	0	2(1)	2	9	5
10	MF	(Republic of Ireland) Lynsey McKey	9(6)	0	2(2)	0	3	1	14	1
11	MF	(Republic of Ireland) Aoibhín Donnelly	20(8)	0	2	0	6	5	28	5
12	DF	(United States) Ella Raimondi	8(1)	0	1	0	0	0	9	0
13	MF	(Republic of Ireland) Cara Griffin	21(10)	1	3(1)	1	6(1)	0	30	2
14	MF	(Republic of Ireland) Roma McLaughlin	1(1)	0	0	0	0	0	1	0
15	DF	(Republic of Ireland) Amy Madden	6(2)	0	0	0	1	0	7	0
16	MF	(Republic of Ireland) Abbie Callanan	9(3)	2	2	0	3(1)	0	14	2
17	MF	(Republic of Ireland) Amy Tierney	4(1)	0	2(1)	0	2(2)	0	8	0
18	FW	(Republic of Ireland) Anna McGough	10(9)	0	3(3)	0	4(3)	2	17	2
19	DF	(Republic of Ireland) Ava Mullins	13(5)	0	2(1)	0	0	0	15	0
20	DF	(United States) Jade Rehberger	8	0	1	0	0	0	9	0
21	MF	(Republic of Ireland) Heather Loomes	4(3)	0	0	0	2(1)	0	6	0
22	DF	(Republic of Ireland) Eve Dossen	19(3)	1	2	0	6	0	27	1
23	FW	(Republic of Ireland) Emma Doherty	22	13	2	3	4	1	28	17
26	GK	(Republic of Ireland) Jayne Merren	0	0	0	0	0	0	0	0
27	FW	(Republic of Ireland) Emily Fitzgerald	3(3)	0	0	0	1(1)	0	4	0
30	GK	(Republic of Ireland) Amanda McQuillan	20	0	2	0	3	0	25	0
41	MF	(Republic of Ireland) Ana Conway	0	0	0	0	1(1)	0	1	0
42	MF	(Republic of Ireland) Grace Gleeson	1(1)	0	1(1)	0	0	0	2	0
46	DF	(Republic of Ireland) Laura Adair	0	0	0	0	0	0	0	0
51	FW	(Republic of Ireland) Holly O'Leary	1(1)	0	0	0	2(2)	0	3	0
71	MF	(Republic of Ireland) Niamh Farrelly	21(1)	1	3	0	4	0	28	1

=== Clean sheets ===
No.	Player	League	FAI Cup	All-Island Cup	Total		
No.	Player	1	(Republic of Ireland) Nicole Nix	1	0	2	3
30	(Republic of Ireland) Amanda McQuillan	8	0	0	8		

=== Disciplinary record ===
No.	Player	League			FAI Cup			All-Island Cup			Total		
No.	Player	Yellow card	(yellow card) (yellow-red card)	Red card	Yellow card	(yellow card) (yellow-red card)	Red card	Yellow card	(yellow card) (yellow-red card)	Red card	Yellow card	(yellow card) (yellow-red card)	Red card
5	Remini Tillotson	3	0	1	0	0	0	0	0	0	3	0	1
6	Niamh Cotter	3	0	0	0	0	0	1	0	0	4	0	0
11	Aoibhín Donnelly	3	0	0	0	0	0	1	0	0	4	0	0
23	Emma Doherty	3	0	0	1	0	0	0	0	0	4	0	0
71	Niamh Farrelly	4	0	0	0	0	0	0	0	0	4	0	0
2	Aoibheann Costello	2	0	0	1	0	0	0	0	0	3	0	0
4	Isabella Beletic	2	0	0	0	0	0	1	0	0	3	0	0
9	Ceola Bergin	3	0	0	0	0	0	0	0	0	3	0	0
22	Eve Dossen	1	0	0	1	0	0	0	0	0	2	0	0
30	Amanda McQuillan	1	0	0	0	0	0	0	0	1	1	0	1
3	Lucy-Jayne Grant	1	0	0	0	0	0	0	0	0	1	0	0
8	Kate Thompson	1	0	0	0	0	0	0	0	0	1	0	0
15	Amy Madden	1	0	0	0	0	0	0	0	0	1	0	0
17	Amy Tierney	1	0	0	0	0	0	0	0	0	1	0	0
21	Heather Loomes	1	0	0	0	0	0	0	0	0	1	0	0
Totals		30	0	1	3	0	0	2	0	1	35	0	2

== International call-ups ==
=== Northern Ireland National Team ===
Player	Fixture	Date	Location	Event
Lucy-Jayne Grant	vs. Portugal	13 October 2026	Estádio Municipal de Portimão, Portimão	2027 FIFA Women's World Cup qualification
