= 2023 Galway United W.F.C. season =

Irish football club season

Galway United
2023 season
- Manager: Phil Trill
- Stadium: Eamonn Deacy Park, Drom Soccer Park
- Women's Premier Division: 4th
- FAI Women's Cup: First Round
- All-Island Cup: Winners
- Top goalscorer: League: Jenna Slattery (8); All: Jenna Slattery (9)
- Highest home attendance: 825; 2–0 v DLR Waves; 9 September 2023 (Premier Dvision)
- Biggest win: 4–0 v Wexford; 11 November 2023 (Away, Premier Division)
Home colours	Away colours	Third colours

The 2023 Galway United W.F.C. season will be the football club's 1st in the League of Ireland Women's Premier Division, having taken the place of the recently dissolved Galway WFC.

At the end of the 2022 season, Galway WFC withdrew from the League of Ireland due to additional costs. The men's club Galway United, set about setting up a replacement team, with Galway WFC's most recent assisstant manager, Phil Trill being appointed as the club's manager.

In their first season the club finished 4th in the league and won the inaugural edition of the All-Island Cup defeating Cliftonville in the final at The Showgrounds.

== Club founding ==
Galway WFC had been representing Galway in the Women's National League since 2013. In September 2022 Galway WFC announced that it would "reluctantly" withdraw from the following season's Women's National League: "We hope that other individuals or entities will take up the mantle to continue the tradition of senior and underage women's football in Galway in 2023." The local League of Ireland club Galway United released a statement on 5 October 2022 confirming that they would take over the running of Galway's women's teams for 2023.

Phil Trill, who had been Alan Murphy's assistant with Galway WFC in 2022, was appointed as the new head coach on 3 December, saying "I’m delighted to have this opportunity. To be the first ever manager to take a women’s team into Galway United is very exciting". Lynsey McKey was confirmed as club captain, with Jenna Slattery and Therese Kinnevey as vice-captains, ahead of the start of the season.

== Squad ==
#	Name	Nationality	Position	Date of birth (age)	Previous Club	Signed	Notes
Goalkeepers
1	Abbiegayle Ronayne	(Republic of Ireland)	GK	October 27, 2002 (aged 21)	(Republic of Ireland) Galway	2023	
20	Jessica Berlin	(United States)	GK	October 11, 1999 (aged 24)	(United States) Seattle Redhawks	2023	
27	Eleanor Hernon	(Republic of Ireland)	GK		(Republic of Ireland) Galway	2023	
Defenders
2	Aoibheann Costello	(Republic of Ireland)	DF	October 4, 2004 (aged 19)	(Republic of Ireland) Galway	2023	
3	Annie Gough	(Republic of Ireland)	DF	April 23, 2003 (aged 20)	(Republic of Ireland) Galway	2023	
5	Jamie Erickson	(Canada)	DF	August 18, 1997 (aged 26)	(Republic of Ireland) Galway	2023	
14	Therese Kinnevey	(Republic of Ireland)	DF	July 15, 2006 (aged 17)	(Republic of Ireland) Galway	2023	Vice-captain
15	Amy Madden	(Republic of Ireland)	DF	May 1, 2006 (aged 17)	(Republic of Ireland) Treaty United	2023	
22	Eve Dossen	(Republic of Ireland)	DF	June 11, 2005 (aged 18)	(Republic of Ireland) Galway	2023	
26	Orlaith Deasy	(Republic of Ireland)	DF	July 5, 2004 (aged 19)	(Republic of Ireland) Wexford Youths	2023	
Midfielders
4	Isabella Beletic	(United States)	MF	July 10, 1998 (aged 25)	(United States) Racing Louisville	2023	
6	Jenna Slattery	(Republic of Ireland)	MF	March 17, 2004 (aged 19)	(Republic of Ireland) Galway	2023	Vice-captain
7	Nicole McNamara	(Republic of Ireland)	MF	December 29, 2004 (aged 18)	(Republic of Ireland) Galway	2023	
8	Kate Thompson	(Republic of Ireland)	MF	August 5, 2005 (aged 18)	(Republic of Ireland) Galway	2023	
10	Lynsey McKey	(Republic of Ireland)	MF	March 6, 1990 (aged 33)	(Republic of Ireland) Galway	2023	Captain
11	Heather Loomes	(Republic of Ireland)	MF	April 11, 2008 (aged 15)	(Republic of Ireland) Knocknacarra	2023	
16	Abbie Callanan	(Republic of Ireland)	MF	November 25, 2003 (aged 19)	(Republic of Ireland) Galway	2023	
21	Siobhan Doolan	(Republic of Ireland)	MF	April 4, 2004 (aged 19)	(Republic of Ireland) Wexford Youths	2023	
24	Emma Duffy	(Republic of Ireland)	MF	July 12, 2007 (aged 16)	(Republic of Ireland) Sligo Rovers	2023	
25	Aislinn Meaney	(Republic of Ireland)	MF	October 24, 1998 (aged 25)	(United States) IUP Crimson Hawks	2023	
Forwards
9	Anna Fahey	(Republic of Ireland)	FW		(Republic of Ireland) Galway	2023	
12	Jodie Griffin	(Republic of Ireland)	FW	April 7, 2006 (aged 17)	(Republic of Ireland) Galway	2023	
13	Rola Olusola	(Republic of Ireland)	FW	October 16, 2006 (aged 17)	(Republic of Ireland) Galway	2023	
17	Julie-Ann Russell	(Republic of Ireland)	FW	March 28, 1991 (aged 32)	(Republic of Ireland) Galway	2023	
18	Róisín Jacob	(Republic of Ireland)	FW	January 29, 1997 (aged 26)	(Republic of Ireland) Galway	2023	
19	Aoife Thompson	(Republic of Ireland)	FW	July 30, 2000 (aged 23)	(Republic of Ireland) Galway	2023	
Players who departed before the end of the season (Note: Age shown displays players’ age at the end of the season. For players who departed before the end of the season, age shown is age at time of departure.)
11	Gemma McGuinness	(Northern Ireland)	FW	August 7, 1995 (aged 28)	(Republic of Ireland) Sligo Rovers	2023	
24	Éabha O'Riordan	(Republic of Ireland)	DF		(Republic of Ireland) Galway	2023	

=== Transfers ===
==== In ====
Date (Note: pre-season transfers are not included as that would include the entire squad)	Position	Nationality	Name	Last club	Ref.
17 August 2023	DF	(Republic of Ireland)	Orlaith Deasy	(Republic of Ireland) Wexford	

==== Out ====
Date	Position	Nationality	Name	To	Ref.
15 August 2023	FW	(Northern Ireland)	Gemma McGuinness	(England) Bournemouth	

== Club ==
- Manager: Phil Trill
- Assistant Manager: Adrian Cronin
- Goalkeeping Coach: Adrian Cronin
- Technical Coach: Gabriel Darcy
- Technical Coach: Theresa Keane

== Competitions ==
=== League of Ireland Women's Premier Division ===
==== League Table ====
Pos	Team	Pld	W	D	L	GF	GA	GD	Pts	Qualification or relegation
1	Peamount United	20	17	1	2	44	15	+29	52	Qualification for the UEFA Women's Champions League
2	Shelbourne	20	15	1	4	49	13	+36	46	
3	Shamrock Rovers	20	13	6	1	51	17	+34	45	
4	Galway United	20	12	2	6	29	13	+16	38	
5	Athlone Town	20	11	2	7	49	25	+24	35	
6	Bohemians	20	9	4	7	21	27	−6	31	
7	Wexford Youths	20	8	4	8	30	31	−1	28	
8	DLR Waves	20	3	4	13	13	31	−18	13	
9	Sligo Rovers	20	3	2	15	22	54	−32	11	
10	Treaty United	20	1	5	14	10	49	−39	8	
11	Cork City	20	1	3	16	11	54	−43	6	

Source: Extratime.com

==== Results summary ====
Overall								Home						Away					
Pld	W	D	L	GF	GA	GD	Pts	W	D	L	GF	GA	GD	W	D	L	GF	GA	GD
20	12	2	6	29	13	+16	38	5	1	4	12	7	+5	7	1	2	17	6	+11

==== Matches ====
Win Draw Loss

4 March 2023 1	Galway United	0–1	Wexford	Terryland, County Galway
14:00 GMT		Report	Rossiter 81'	Stadium: Eamonn Deacy Park; Attendance: 251; Referee: Daniel Murphy

11 March 2023 2	Cork City	0–1	Galway United	Turners Cross, Cork
17:00 GMT		Report	Slattery 90'	Stadium: Turners Cross; Attendance: 302; Referee: Ian O'Keeffe

18 March 2023 3	Galway United	0–1	Bohemians	Terryland, County Galway
14:00 GMT		Report	Rowe 40'	Stadium: Eamonn Deacy Park; Attendance: 133; Referee: Daryl Carolan

25 March 2023 4	Shelbourne	1–2	Galway United	Drumcondra, Dublin 3
14:00 GMT	Stapleton 3'	Report	Thompson 56'; Slattery 58'; McGuinness (yellow card) 51' (yellow-red card) 69'	Stadium: Tolka Park; Attendance: 280; Referee: David Dunne

29 March 2023 5	Athlone Town	1–2	Galway United	Lissywollen, Athlone
19:45 GMT	Scheriff 66'	Report	Erickson 19'; Callanan 39'	Stadium: Athlone Town Stadium; Attendance: 221; Referee: Marc Lynch

15 April 2023 6	Galway United	1–1	Shamrock Rovers	Terryland, County Galway
17:00 GMT	McGuinness 13'	Report	Thompson 85'	Stadium: Eamonn Deacy Park; Attendance: 225; Referee: Oliver Moran

22 April 2023 7	Galway United	2–1	Sligo Rovers	Terryland, County Galway
14:00 GMT	Thompson 3'; Slattery 5'	Report	Doherty 57'	Stadium: Eamonn Deacy Park; Attendance: 102; Referee: Robert Dowling

29 April 2023 8	DLR Waves	0–2	Galway United	Belfield, Dublin 4
16:00 GMT		Report	McGuinness 12'; Slattery 60'	Stadium: UCD Bowl; Attendance: 110; Referee: Kate O’Brien

6 May 2023 9	Galway United	1–0	Treaty United	Terryland, County Galway
17:00 GMT	Dossen 31'	Report		Stadium: Eamonn Deacy Park; Attendance: 96; Referee: Marc Lynch

20 May 2023 10	Peamount United	2–0	Galway United	Newcastle, Dublin 22
17:00 GMT	Doyle 44', 57'	Report		Stadium: Greenogue; Attendance: 308; Referee: Robert Dowling

27 May 2023 11	Shamrock Rovers	2–1	Galway United	Tallaght, Dublin 24
17:30 GMT	O'Gorman 45'; Larkin 47'	Report	McGuinness 68'	Stadium: Tallaght Stadium; Attendance: 485; Referee: Adriano Reale

3 June 2023 12	Galway United	0–2	Shelbourne	Terryland, County Galway
14:00 GMT		Report	Quinn 22'; Gray 25'	Stadium: Eamonn Deacy Park; Attendance: 89; Referee: Ray Matthews

10 June 2023 13	Sligo Rovers	0–2	Galway United	Sligo, County Sligo
17:00 GMT		Report	Kinnevey 12'; Slattery 63'	Stadium: The Showgrounds; Attendance: 315; Referee: Declan Toland

19 August 2023 14	Galway United	3–0	Cork City	Terryland, County Galway
17:00 GMT	Slattery 9', 59'; McKey 52'	Report		Stadium: Eamonn Deacy Park; Attendance: 129

2 September 2023 15	Bohemians	0–0	Galway United	Phibsborough, Dublin 7
15:00 GMT		Report		Stadium: Dalymount Park; Attendance: 303; Referee: Robert Dowling

9 September 2023 16	Galway United	2–0	DLR Waves	Terryland, County Galway
17:35 GMT	Beletic 6'; Dossen 16'	Report		Stadium: Eamonn Deacy Park; Attendance: 825; Referee: Ray Matthews

21 October 2023 17	Treaty United	0–3	Galway United	Limerick, County Limerick
17:00 GMT		Report	Thompson 20'; Griffin 44'; Erickson 90+4'	Stadium: Markets Field; Attendance: 159; Referee: Mark Patchell

1 November 2023 18	Galway United	0–1	Athlone Town	Terryland, County Galway
19:45 GMT		Report	Singleton 32'	Stadium: Eamonn Deacy Park; Attendance: 131; Referee: Declan Toland

4 November 2023 19	Galway United	3–0	Peamount United	Drom, County Galway
17:00 GMT	Olusola 47', 65'; Slattery 72'	Report		Stadium: Drom Soccer Park; Attendance: 85; Referee: Robert Dowling

11 November 2023 20	Wexford	0–4	Galway United	Crossabeg, County Wexford
16:30 GMT		Report	Callanan 12', 13'; Olusola 44', 83'	Stadium: Ferrycarrig Park; Attendance: 171; Referee: Ian O'Keeffe

=== FAI Cup ===
Win Draw Loss

==== First Round ====
26 August 2023 First Round	Athlone Town	0–0 (a.e.t.) (5–4 p)	Galway United	Lissywollen, Athlone
19:00 GMT		Report		Stadium: Athlone Town Stadium; Attendance: 114; Referee: Daryl Carolan
	Penalties
	Scheriff (penalty scored); Singleton (penalty scored); Slevin (penalty missed); Molloy (penalty scored); Shine (penalty scored); Keenan (penalty scored)		(penalty scored) Kinnevey; (penalty scored) Thompson; (penalty scored) Gough; (penalty scored) Erickson; (penalty missed) Slattery; (penalty missed) McKey

=== All-Island Cup ===
Pos	Team	Pld	W	D	L	GF	GA	GD	Pts	Qualification
1	(Republic of Ireland) Galway United	3	2	1	0	3	0	+3	7	Advance to Semi-finals
2	(Republic of Ireland) Shelbourne	3	1	1	1	5	4	+1	4	
3	(Republic of Ireland) Athlone Town	3	1	1	1	3	5	−2	4	
4	(Northern Ireland) Linfield	3	0	1	2	2	4	−2	1	

Source: Extra time

Win Draw Loss

==== Group stage ====
17 June 2023 1	Linfield (Northern Ireland)	0–1	(Republic of Ireland) Galway United	Belfast, County Antrim
18:00 GMT		Report	Slattery 4'	Stadium: Midgley Park; Attendance: 130; Referee: Andrew Woodside

24 June 2023 2	Galway United (Republic of Ireland)	0–0	(Republic of Ireland) Athlone Town	Terryland, County Galway
17:00 GMT		Report		Stadium: Eamonn Deacy Park; Referee: Marc Lynch

1 July 2023 3	Galway United (Republic of Ireland)	2–0	(Republic of Ireland) Shelbourne	Terryland, County Galway
17:00 GMT	Callanan 45'; McGuinness 90+3'	Report		Stadium: Eamonn Deacy Park; Referee: Mark Houlihan

==== Semi-finals ====
8 July 2023 Semi-final	Wexford (Republic of Ireland)	1–1 (3–4 p)	(Republic of Ireland) Galway United	Crossabeg, County Wexford
16:00 GMT	Jarrett 52'	Report	Thompson 71'	Stadium: Ferrycarrig Park; Referee: Jason Moore
	Penalties
	Jarrett (penalty scored); Murphy (penalty missed); Sinnott (penalty scored); Clancy (penalty scored); Rossiter (penalty missed)		(penalty scored) Kinnevey; (penalty missed) Thompson; (penalty scored) Erickson; (penalty scored) Slattery; (penalty scored) McGuinness

==== Final ====
23 July 2023 Final	Cliftonville (Northern Ireland)	0–1	(Republic of Ireland) Galway United	Sligo, County Sligo
15:00 GMT		Report	McGuinness 12'	Stadium: The Showgrounds; Attendance: 579; Referee: Robert Dowling

=== Friendlies ===
Win Draw Loss

==== Pre-season Friendlies ====
11 February 2023	Galway United	1–2	Sligo Rovers	Terryland, County Galway
13:00 GMT	Olusola 49'		Doherty 26'; Lillie 68'	Stadium: Eamonn Deacy Park; Referee: Marc Lynch

18 February 2023	DLR Waves	0–0	Galway United	Belfield, Dublin 4
14:00 GMT				Stadium: UCD Bowl; Referee: Alan Carey

26 February 2023	Galway United	3–0	Treaty United	Terryland, County Galway
12:00 GMT	McKey 1'; Callanan 45+1'; Erickson 81'			Stadium: Eamonn Deacy Park; Referee: Ciaran O'Reilly

== Statistics ==
=== Appearances and goals ===
This table shows all of the players who have featured in a first team squad for Galway United this season
Brackets denotes appearances made as a substitute

No.	Pos.	Player	League		FAI Cup		AI Cup		Total	
No.	Pos.	Player	Apps	Goals	Apps	Goals	Apps	Goals	Apps	Goals
1	GK	(Republic of Ireland) Abbiegayle Ronayne	7	0	0	0	2	0	9	0
2	DF	(Republic of Ireland) Aoibheann Costello	11(2)	0	1	0	4(1)	0	16	0
3	DF	(Republic of Ireland) Kayla Brady	0	0	0	0	0	0	0	0
3	DF	(Republic of Ireland) Annie Gough	3(2)	0	1(1)	0	0	0	4	0
4	MF	(United States) Isabella Beletic	17(1)	1	1	0	5	0	23	1
5	DF	(Canada) Jamie Erickson	20	2	1	0	5	0	26	2
6	MF	(Republic of Ireland) Jenna Slattery	20	8	1	0	5	1	26	9
7	MF	(Republic of Ireland) Nicole McNamara	10(7)	0	0	0	2(2)	0	12	0
8	MF	(Republic of Ireland) Kate Thompson	17(1)	2	1	0	4	1	22	3
9	FW	(Republic of Ireland) Anna Fahey	5(3)	0	0	0	1(1)	0	6	0
10	MF	(Republic of Ireland) Lynsey McKey	17	1	1	0	5	0	23	1
11	FW	(Northern Ireland) Gemma McGuinness	11	3	0	0	5(1)	2	16	5
11	MF	(Republic of Ireland) Heather Loomes	1(1)	0	0	0	0	0	1	0
12	FW	(Republic of Ireland) Jodie Griffin	12(6)	1	1	0	2(1)	0	15	1
13	FW	(Republic of Ireland) Rola Olusola	13(9)	4	0	0	5(5)	0	18	4
14	DF	(Republic of Ireland) Therese Kinnevey	20	1	1	0	5	0	26	1
15	DF	(Republic of Ireland) Amy Madden	15(5)	0	1(1)	0	3(3)	0	19	0
16	MF	(Republic of Ireland) Abbie Callanan	14(4)	3	0	0	3	1	17	4
17	FW	(Republic of Ireland) Leah Brady	0	0	0	0	0	0	0	0
17	FW	(Republic of Ireland) Julie-Ann Russell	1	0	0	0	0	0	1	0
18	FW	(Republic of Ireland) Róisín Jacob	8(6)	0	0	0	3	0	11	0
19	FW	(Republic of Ireland) Aoife Thompson	13(5)	1	0	0	1	0	14	1
20	GK	(United States) Jessica Berlin	13	0	1	0	3	0	17	0
21	MF	(Republic of Ireland) Siobhan Doolan	10(9)	0	1(1)	0	2(1)	0	13	0
22	DF	(Republic of Ireland) Eve Dossen	19(1)	2	1	0	4(1)	0	24	2
24	DF	(Republic of Ireland) Éabha O'Riordan	0	0	0	0	0	0	0	0
24	MF	(Republic of Ireland) Emma Duffy	6(6)	0	0	0	0	0	6	0
25	MF	(Republic of Ireland) Aislinn Meaney	6(1)	0	1	0	2	0	9	0
26	DF	(Republic of Ireland) Orlaith Deasy	2(2)	0	0	0	0	0	2	0
27	GK	(Republic of Ireland) Eleanor Hernon	1(1)	0	0	0	0	0	1	0

=== Clean sheets ===
No.	Player	League	FAI Cup	AI Cup	Total		
No.	Player	1	(Republic of Ireland) Abbiegayle Ronayne	3	0	2	5
20	(United States) Jessica Berlin	6	1	2	9		
27	(Republic of Ireland) Eleanor Hernon	0	0	0	0		
