= 2024 All-Island Cup final =

- Event: 2024 All-Island Cup
Shamrock Rovers	Galway United
(Republic of Ireland)	(Republic of Ireland)
0	0
- Galway United won 4–3 on penalties
- Date: 17 August 2024
- Venue: Tallaght Stadium, Dublin
- Referee: Alan Patchell
- Attendance: 1,347

The 2024 All-Island Cup final, known as the Avenir All-Island Cup final for sponsorship reasons, was the final match of the 2024 All-Island Cup, a knock-out women's association football competition contested annually by clubs affiliated with the Football Association of Ireland and the Irish Football Association. It took place on 17 August 2024 at Tallaght Stadium in Dublin, and was contested by Cliftonville and Galway United. Galway won the match 4–3 on penalties following a 0–0 draw to retain the cup, meaning they had won both of the first two editions of the tournament.

== Background ==
The two sides had already faced twice that season in the league, one of which was seven days before the final, both of which ended in 1–0 victories for Galway United.

Galway United won the cup in 2023, defeating Cliftonville 1–0 at The Showgrounds in the final.

=== Route to the final ===
Note: In all results below, the score of the finalist is given first (H: home; A: away).

Shamrock Rovers		Round	Galway United	
Opponent	Result	Group stage	Opponent	Result
Treaty United	1–1 (A)	Matchday 1	Sligo Rovers	2–0 (A)
DLR Waves	4–0 (H)	Matchday 2	Glentoran	4–0 (H)
Crusaders Strikers	2–2 (A)	Matchday 3	Athlone Town	2–2 (H)
Group C: Pos / Team / Pld / Pts; 1 / (Republic of Ireland) Shamrock Rovers / 3 / 5; 2 / (Republic of Ireland) Treaty United / 3 / 5; 3 / (Northern Ireland) Crusaders Strikers / 3 / 4; 4 / (Republic of Ireland) DLR Waves / 3 / 1; Source: Soccerway		Final standings	Group D: Pos / Team / Pld / Pts; 1 / (Republic of Ireland) Galway United / 3 / 7; 2 / (Republic of Ireland) Athlone Town / 3 / 7; 3 / (Northern Ireland) Glentoran / 3 / 3; 4 / (Republic of Ireland) Sligo Rovers / 3 / 0; Source: Soccerway	
Opponent	Result	Knockout stage	Opponent	Result
Peamount United	3–0 (H)	Quarter-final	Treaty United	1–0 (H)
Shelbourne	2–1 (A)	Semi-final	Wexford	2–2 (4–2 p) (H)

== Match ==
=== Details ===
17 August 2024
19:35 IST

Shamrock Rovers (Republic of Ireland)	0–0	(Republic of Ireland) Galway United
	Report
Penalties
Zambra (penalty scored); O'Gorman (penalty scored); Kelly (penalty scored); Ralph (penalty missed); Herron (penalty missed)	3–4	(penalty scored) Kinnevey; (penalty scored) Thompson; (penalty missed) Slattery; (penalty scored) Meaney; (penalty scored) Erickson

Tallaght Stadium, Dublin
Attendance: 1,347
Referee: Alan Patchell

Shamrock Rovers	Galway United

GK	1	(Republic of Ireland) Amanda Budden
DF	2	(Republic of Ireland) Fiona Owens		(substituted off) 86'
DF	4	(Republic of Ireland) Shauna Fox
DF	5	(Republic of Ireland) Jessica Hennessy
DF	6	(Republic of Ireland) Maria Reynolds
DF	20	(Republic of Ireland) Scarlett Herron
MF	8	(Republic of Ireland) Aoife Kelly	(yellow card) 77'
MF	22	(Republic of Ireland) Melissa O'Kane
FW	11	(Republic of Ireland) Lia O'Leary		(substituted off) 78'
FW	13	(Republic of Ireland) Áine O'Gorman (c)
FW	19	(Republic of Ireland) Joy Ralph
Substitutes:
GK	25	(Republic of Ireland) Summer Lawless
DF	3	(Republic of Ireland) Savannah McCarthy
MF	17	(Republic of Ireland) Alannah Prizeman
MF	21	(Republic of Ireland) Jaime Thompson
FW	11	(Republic of Ireland) Stephanie Zambra		(substituted on) 86'
FW	14	(Republic of Ireland) Lauren Kelly
FW	23	(Republic of Ireland) Ella Kelly		(substituted on) 78'
FW	24	(Republic of Ireland) Anna Butler
FW	67	(Republic of Ireland) Katie O'Reilly
Manager:
(Republic of Ireland) Collie O'Neill

GK	20	(United States) Jessica Berlin
DF	5	(Canada) Jamie Erickson
DF	14	(Republic of Ireland) Therese Kinnevey
DF	15	(Republic of Ireland) Amy Madden	(yellow card) 43'	(substituted off) 62'
DF	22	(Republic of Ireland) Eve Dossen	(yellow card) 83'
MF	4	(United States) Isabella Beletic	(yellow card) 35'
MF	6	(Republic of Ireland) Jenna Slattery
MF	8	(Republic of Ireland) Kate Thompson
MF	10	(Republic of Ireland) Lynsey McKey (c)		(substituted off) 62'
FW	9	(Republic of Ireland) Rola Olusola	(yellow card) 51'	(substituted off) 85'
FW	11	(Republic of Ireland) Julie-Ann Russell
Substitutes:
GK	1	(United States) Kaylee Hammer
DF	2	(Republic of Ireland) Aoibheann Costello		(substituted on) 62'
DF	3	(Republic of Ireland) Lucy-Jayne Grant
MF	7	(Republic of Ireland) Aislinn Meaney	(yellow card) 64'	(substituted on) 62'
MF	16	(Republic of Ireland) Abbie Callanan
MF	18	(Republic of Ireland) Roisin Jacob
MF	24	(Republic of Ireland) Emma Duffy
FW	13	(United States) Emily Kavanaugh
FW	17	(Canada) Amanda Smith		(substituted on) 85'
Manager:
(Republic of Ireland) Phil Trill
