= Jenna Slattery =

Irish footballer (born 2004)

Personal information
- Date of birth: 17 March 2004 (age 22)
- Place of birth: Limerick, Ireland
- Height: 1.63 m (5 ft 4 in)
- Position: Midfielder

Team information
- Current team: Ipswich Town

Youth career
- Fairview Rangers
- 2020: Treaty United

Senior career*
Years	Team	Apps	(Gls)
2020–2021	Treaty United	27	(12)
2022	Galway	23	(7)
2023–2024	Galway United	39	(18)
2025–2026	Hearts	28	(9)
2026–	Ipswich Town	0	(0)

International career
2019–2020	Republic of Ireland U17		
2021–2022	Republic of Ireland U19	11	(2)
- * Club domestic league appearances and goals

Jenna Slattery (born 17 March 2004) is an Irish professional footballer who plays as a midfielder for WSL 2 club Ipswich Town.

Slattery played youth football with Fairview Rangers before starting her professional career with Treaty United. She would then also go on to play for Galway WFC, Galway United and Hearts.

She represented the Republic of Ireland at youth international level.

== Club career ==
=== Treaty United ===
In 2020, Slattery signed for the newly formed Treaty United for their first season in the League of Ireland. On 13 September 2020, she scored a penalty against Wexford Youths in her first ever start for the club.

In her second season with the club she scored 10 goals and won the club's Player of the Year award at the age of just 17.

=== Galway WFC ===
On 10 February 2022, Slattery signed for fellow Women's National League club Galway WFC. Slattery scored 7 goals in her only season with the club, as the club withdrew from the league.

=== Galway United ===
After Galway WFC withdrew from the league they would go on to be replaced by Galway United, who Slattery would sign for and be named as vice-captain to Lynsey McKey alongside Therese Kinnevey ahead of the club's first season. During her first season she won the League's Player of the Month award for April 2023. Also in her first season Galway United won the first ever All-Island Cup as Slattery started in the final as the club defeated Cliftonville 1–0 at The Showgrounds.

The next season Galway United were once again in the All-Island Cup final, this time against Shamrock Rovers in Tallaght Stadium. Slattery played the 120 minutes as the game finished 0–0. Durin the penalty shoot-out Slattery took a penalty which she missed, however Shamrock Rovers would then miss their next two penalties leading to Galway retaining their title. In the league in the 2024 season, Slattery scored 10 goals winning the league's golden boot.

=== Hearts ===
On 22 January 2025, Slattery signed for Scottish Women's Premier League side Hearts. On 16 April, having missed the opening games of the season, Slattery made her debut in a 2–0 victory over Motherwell.

In her first and only full season with the club, Slattery played a key role, scoring 9 goals as Hearts won the SWPL for the first time in their history.

=== Ipswich Town ===
On 1 July 2026, Slattery signed for Women's Super League 2 club Ipswich Town.

== International career ==
Slattery has represented Ireland at Under-17 and Under-19 level. On 11 April 2023, Slattery scored in a U19 Euro qualifier against Croatia.

== Career statistics ==
=== Club ===
As of match played 10 July 2026

Appearances and goals by club, season and competition
Club	Season	League			National cup (Note: Includes FAI Women's Cup, Women's Scottish Cup, Women's FA Cup)		League cup (Note: Includes SWPL Cup, Women's League Cup)		Other		Total	
Club	Season	Division	Apps	Goals	Apps	Goals	Apps	Goals	Apps	Goals	Apps	Goals
Treaty United	2020	Women's National League	5	2	0	0	—		—		5	2
Treaty United	2021	Women's National League	22	10	1	0	—		—		23	10
Treaty United	Total		27	12	1	0	0	0	0	0	28	12
Galway	2022	Women's National League	23	7	0	0	—		—		23	7
Galway United	2023	LOI Women's Premier Division	20	8	1	0	—		5 (Note: Appearance(s) in All-Island Cup)	1	26	9
Galway United	2024	LOI Women's Premier Division	19	10	1	0	—		5	2	25	12
Galway United	Total		39	18	2	0	0	0	10	3	51	21
Hearts	2024–25	SWPL	5	0	0	0	0	0	—		5	0
Hearts	2025–26	SWPL	23	9	0	0	2	0	—		25	9
Hearts	Total		28	9	0	0	2	0	0	0	30	9
Ipswich Town	2026–27	WSL 2	0	0	0	0	0	0	0	0	0	0
Career total			117	46	3	0	2	0	10	3	132	49

== Honours ==
Galway United

- All-Island Cup: 2023, 2024

Hearts

- Scottish Premier League: 2025–26

Individual

- League of Ireland Women's Premier Division Golden Boot: 2024
