= Lucy-Jayne Grant =

Northern Irish footballer (born 2003)

Personal information
- Date of birth: 30 December 2003 (age 22)
- Place of birth: Ballyhaise, County Cavan, Ireland
- Height: 1.73 m (5 ft 8 in)
- Position: Defender

Team information
- Current team: Galway United
- Number: 3

Youth career
- 2019–2021: Athlone Town

Senior career*
Years	Team	Apps	(Gls)
2021–2023	Athlone Town	31	(1)
2024–	Galway United	50	(1)

International career^{‡}
2026–	Northern Ireland	1	(0)
- * Club domestic league appearances and goals as of 23:59, 2 October 2026 (UTC) ‡ National team caps and goals as of 22:26, 14 October 2026 (UTC)

Lucy-Jayne Grant (born 30 December 2003) is a professional footballer who plays as a defender for League of Ireland Women's Premier Division club Galway United and the Northern Ireland national team.

Grant played youth football with Athlone Town before making her debut for the club in 2024. She would go on to win and FAI Cup with Athlone, before joining Galway United where she would win the All-Island Cup in her first season.

Born in Cavan she is eligible for the Northern Ireland national team through her father. She received her first call-up in 2026.

== Club career ==
=== Athlone Town ===
On 24 July 2021, Grant made her debut for Women's National League club Athlone Town at the Athlone Town Stadium against Peamount United. On 3 August, she scored her first goal for the club, a free-kick against Galway WFC.

At the end of the 2022 season, Athlone Town made it to the FAI Women's Cup final where they lost 0–2 to Shelbourne at Tallaght Stadium.

The next season Athlone made it to the final of the FAI Women's Cup against Shelbourne again, this time the game ended 2–2 and Athlone went on to win on penalties.

=== Galway United ===
On 27 February 2024, Grant signed for League of Ireland Women's Premier Division club Galway United ahead of the 2024 season. During the season Galway made it to the All-Island Cup final where they defeated Shamrock Rovers on penalties.

During the 2026 season, Galway United once again made it to the All-Island Cup final, where Grant started as the club lost 0–2 to Shelbourne at Tolka Park.

== International career ==
On 30 September 2026, Grant was named in the Northern Ireland national team squad for the first time, for their 2027 FIFA Women's World Cup play-off matches against Portugal.

== Career statistics ==
=== Club ===
As of match played 26 September 2026

Appearances and goals by club, season and competition
Club	Season	League			National cup (Note: Includes FAI Women's Cup)		Other		Total	
Club	Season	Division	Apps	Goals	Apps	Goals	Apps	Goals	Apps	Goals
Athlone Town	2021	Women's National League	9	1	1	0	—		10	1
Athlone Town	2022	Women's National League	13	0	1	0	—		14	0
Athlone Town	2023	Women's National League	9	0	1	0	3 (Note: Appearances in the All-Island Cup)	0	13	0
Athlone Town	Total		31	1	3	0	3	0	37	1
Galway United	2024	LOI Women's Premier Division	13	0	1	0	5	1	19	1
Galway United	2025	LOI Women's Premier Division	20	0	1	0	5	0	26	0
Galway United	2026	LOI Women's Premier Division	17	1	3	0	6	0	26	1
Galway United	Total		50	1	5	0	16	1	71	2
Career total			131	10	9	0	7	0	158	11

=== International ===
As of 13 October 2026

Appearances and goals by national team and year
National team	Year	Apps	Goals
Northern Ireland	2026	1	0
Total		1	0

== Honours ==
Athlone Town

- League of Ireland Women's Premier Division; runner up: 2022
- FAI Women's Cup: 2023; runner-up 2022
- Women's President's Cup: 2023

Galway United

- All-Island Cup: 2024; runner-up 2026
