= Lynsey McKey =

Irish footballer (born 1990)

Personal information
- Date of birth: 6 March 1990 (age 36)
- Place of birth: Ennis, County Clare, Ireland
- Height: 1.64 m (5 ft 5 in)
- Positions: Attacking midfielder; forward

Team information
- Current team: Galway United
- Number: 10

Youth career
- Shannon Town United

College career
Years	Team	Apps	(Gls)
2009	Slippery Rock University	6	(1)

Senior career*
Years	Team	Apps	(Gls)
2011–2013	Cork Women’s	18	(9)
2013–2022	Galway	169	(62)
2023–	Galway United	46	(4)

International career
- Republic of Ireland U17
- * Club domestic league appearances and goals as of 11 May 2026 (UTC)

Lynsey McKey (born 6 March 1990) is an Irish professional footballer who plays as a midfielder for and captains, League of Ireland Women's Premier Division club Galway United.

McKey played youth football with Shannon Town United and college football with Slippery Rock University, before starting her professional career with Cork Women's FC. McKey would join Galway WFC in 2013, playing for the club for nine years before the club withdrew from the league in 2022. She would then go on to join the newly formed Galway United.

== College career ==
In 2009, McKey played for the women's soccer team of Slippery Rock University.

== Career ==
=== Cork Women ===
In 2011, the Women's National League was founded as a women's top flight in the Republic of Ireland. For the first season of the league McKey played for Cork Women's FC.

On 27 November 2011, McKey scored a brace against Castlebar Celtic at Turners Cross to earn a 2–2 draw, and put Cork Women's first ever point on the board, in the National League.

=== Galway WFC ===
On 30 September 2013, McKey signed for newly added Women's National League side Galway WFC ahead of the 2013–14 season. On 2 March 2014, McKey scored a hat-trick against her former club, Cork in a massive 9–0 victory. At the end of her first season at the club McKey made the Team of the Season.

On 1 December 2014, McKey scored a brace against Cork in a 5–0 win over her old club. On 8 February 2015, McKey featured in the national league cup semi-final as Galway lost on penalties to Peamount United.

In September 2015, McKey scored a hat-trick in a 7–2 win away against Castlebar Celtic. In the return fixture against the Mayo side. on 31 October, McKey scored a brace in a 5–0 win at Eamonn Deacy Park.

On the opening day of the 2016 season, McKey got a hat-trick of assists in a 6–0 win against Kilkenny United. In August 2019, McKey got five assists in one game in a 6–1 win over Limerick.

On 10 October 2020, McKey scored a brace against her former club Cork, to end Cork's six game winning run.

At the end of the 2022 season Galway WFC announced their withdrawal from the League of Ireland.

=== Galway United ===
Galway WFC would go on to be replaced by Galway United, who McKey would sign for and be named club captain.

In her first season with the club, she would lead the team to the 2023 All-Island Cup final, where Galway would defeat Cliftonville 1–0 at The Showgrounds. A year later the club would repeat the feat, as once again McKey captained them to the All-Island Cup final, where they would defeat Shamrock Rovers on penalties at Tallaght Stadium.

== Career statistics ==
=== Club ===
As of match played 30 May 2026

Appearances and goals by club, season and competition
Club	Season	League			National cup (Note: Includes FAI Women's Cup)		League cup (Note: Includes WNL Cup)		Other		Total	
Club	Season	Division	Apps	Goals	Apps	Goals	Apps	Goals	Apps	Goals	Apps	Goals
Cork Women's	2011–12	Women's National League	8	4	0	0	0	0	—		8	4
Cork Women's	2012–13	Women's National League	10	5	0	0	1	0	—		11	5
Cork Women's	Total		18	9	0	0	1	0	0	0	19	9
Galway	2013–14	Women's National League	17	7	1	0	2	1	—		18	8
Galway	2015–15	Women's National League	18	7	1	1	0	0	—		19	8
Galway	2015–16	Women's National League	12	7	0	0	2	1	3 (Note: Appearances in WNL Shield)	6	17	14
Galway	2016	Women's National League	11	3	0	0	0	0	—		11	3
Galway	2017	Women's National League	18	7	1	0	1	0	2	1	22	8
Galway	2018	Women's National League	19	5	1	0	2	3	1	1	23	9
Galway	2019	Women's National League	16	9	1	0	1	0	—		18	9
Galway	2020	Women's National League	12	6	1	0	—		—		13	6
Galway	2021	Women's National League	24	7	1	0	—		—		25	7
Galway	2022	Women's National League	22	4	1	0	—		—		23	4
Galway	Total		169	62	8	1	8	5	6	8	191	76
Galway United	2023	LOI Women's Premier Division	17	1	1	0	—		5 (Note: Appearances in the All-Island Cup)	0	23	1
Galway United	2024	LOI Women's Premier Division	13	2	0	0	—		5	0	18	2
Galway United	2025	LOI Women's Premier Division	9	1	0	0	—		2	0	11	1
Galway United	2026	LOI Women's Premier Division	5	0	0	0	—		2	1	7	1
Galway United	Total		44	4	1	0	0	0	14	1	59	5
Career total			231	75	9	1	9	5	20	9	269	90

== Honours ==
Galway United

- All-Island Cup: 2023, 2024
