= Nigel Keady =

Irish footballer (born 1979)

Personal information
- Date of birth: 24 May 1979 (age 47)
- Place of birth: Galway, Ireland
- Height: 1.80 m (5 ft 11 in)
- Position: Defender

Youth career
- Galway Hibernians

Senior career*
Years	Team	Apps	(Gls)
2000–2006	Galway United	200	(0)
2007	Limerick 37	20	(0)
2008	Athlone Town	28	(0)
2009	Mervue United	14	(1)

Managerial career
- 2013–2014: Galway WFC
- 2017–2020: Galway United U19s
- * Club domestic league appearances and goals

Nigel Keady (born 24 May 1979) is an Irish football coach and former player, he currently works as a Regional Manager for the FAI.

Keady played youth football with Galway Hibernians before starting his professional career with Galway United. He would spend six years with Galway United, going on to have spells with Limerick, Athlone Town and Mervue United.

Keady was the first ever manager of Galway WFC after they joined the Women's National League.

== Playing career ==
=== Galway United ===
In August 2000, Keady signed for League of Ireland Premier Division club Galway United ahead of the 2000–01 season.

At the end of the 2001–02 season, Galway United were relegated as the league downsized from 12 to 10 teams.

In the 2002–03 season, Galway United reached the play-offs. However, in the play-off final against Drogheda United after winning the first leg 2–0, Galway would lose the second leg 0–3 after extra-time.

For the 2005 and 2006 seasons Keady captained Galway United.

In Keady's final season with the club, Galway United were promoted back to the Premier Division after an FAI assessment group had deemed that Dundalk did not meet the criteria to be promoted, thus Galway United were promoted in their place. Keady departed Galway United holding the record for the most appearances for the club without scoring a goal.

=== Limerick 37 ===
Keady joined Limerick 37 after they had only just about received a license to participate in the 2007 League of Ireland First Division.

=== Athlone Town ===
Keady signed for Athlone Town ahead of the 2008 season.

=== Mervue United ===
On 19 February 2009, Keady signed for newly promoted First Division side Mervue United. On 17 October 2009, Keady scored his first goal for the club in a 1–2 defeat to UCD.

== Managerial career ==
=== Galway WFC ===
In 2013, Galway WFC joined the Women's National League as an expansion team for the 2013–14 season. Keady was announced as the club's manager ahead of their first ever league season as a club. In his olnly season with the club he guided the team to a 6th-place finish, before going on to be replaced by his own former manager Don O'Riordan.

=== Galway United U19s ===
From 2015, Keady would go on to serve as assistant coach to Johnny Glynn with the Galway United under-19s. On 24 January 2017, Keady was appointed as the manager of the Galway United U19s. Keady would stay in the role for 4 season before departing at the start of 2021 to become a Regional Manager for the FAI.

== Career statistics ==
=== Managerial career ===
Managerial record by team and tenure
Team	From	To	Record							
Team	From	To	G	W	D	L	GF	GA	GD	Win %
(Republic of Ireland) Galway WFC	25 August 2013	26 April 2014	21	8	2	11	43	42	+1	38.10
Total			21	8	2	11	43	42	+1	38.10
