= Anna Kristīne Gornela =

Footballer (born 1997)

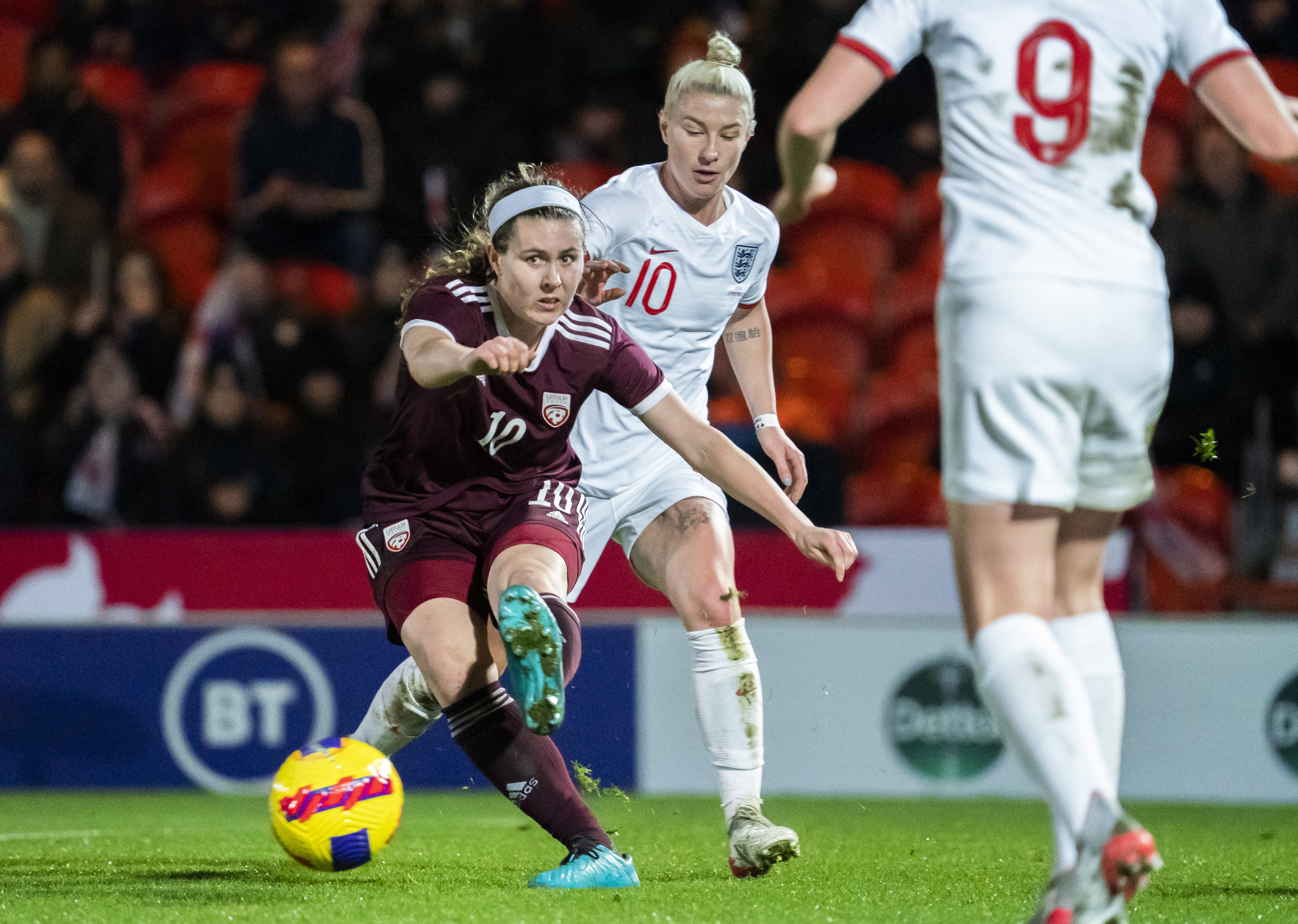

Personal information
- Full name: Anna Kristīne Gornela
- Birth name: Anna Gornell
- Date of birth: 9 September 1997 (age 29)
- Place of birth: Omaha, Nebraska, United States
- Height: 1.68 m (5 ft 6 in)
- Position: Midfielder

Team information
- Current team: Waterford

College career
| Years | Team | Apps | (Gls) |
| 2016–2019 | Oral Roberts Golden Eagles | 71 | (1) |

Senior career*
| Years | Team | Apps | (Gls) |
| 2021 | Sundsvalls DFF | 11 | (0) |
| 2021–2022 | FC Dornbirn | | |
| 2022–2023 | PAOK | 15 | (0) |
| 2023 | Mura | 9 | (2) |
| 2024–2025 | Riga FC | | |
| 2026– | Waterford | 5 | (0) |

International career^{‡}
| 2021– | Latvia | 27 | (0) |
- * Club domestic league appearances and goals as of 8 March 2026 ‡ National team caps and goals as of 8 March 2026

Anna Kristīne Gornela (born Anna Gornell, 9 September 1997) is a footballer who plays as a midfielder for Waterford in Ireland. Born in the United States, she plays for the Latvia national team.

== Club career ==
In the 2022/23 season Gornela won the Panelinio Protathlima trophy with PAOK, the Pan-Hellenic Women's Football Championship. This is also Women's Alpha Ethniki is the highest professional women's football league in Greece. Gornela helped PAOK place second in the UEFA Women's Champions League qualify stage.

In the 2023 season Gornela playing for ŽNK Mura, she contributed to the Slovenian league title and the Zenska Liga trophy with ŽNK Mura Gornela helped ŽNK Mura place third in the UEFA Women's Champions League qualify stage.

In the 2024 season Gornela playing for Riga F.C. won to the Latvian league title and the Champions Cup in the Women's Football League (SFL). The team finished the season with 17 wins, 1 loss and 1 draw. Winning the league title has qualified them to play in the UEFA Women's Champions League in 2025.

== International career ==
Gornela made her debut for Latvia in a 20–0 defeat against England on 30 November 2021.

== Honours ==
=== Paok ===
- Greek A Division – 2022–23

=== ŽNK Mura ===
- Slovenian League – 2023–24
- Slovenian Women's Cup – 2023–24

=== Riga ===
- Latvian Championship – 2024, 2025
- Latvian Women's Cup – 2025
