= Maria Reynolds (footballer) =

Irish footballer

Personal information
- Date of birth: 20 April 2004 (age 22)
- Place of birth: Bray, Wicklow, Ireland
- Position: Centre-back

Team information
- Current team: Sheffield United
- Number: 12

Youth career
- Enniskerry FC
- Greystones United
- Peamount United
- 2020–2023: Shamrock Rovers

Senior career*
Years	Team	Apps	(Gls)
2023–2026	Shamrock Rovers	44	(1)
2026–	Sheffield United	0	(0)

International career^{‡}
- Republic of Ireland U17
2021–2022	Republic of Ireland U19	7	(0)
- * Club domestic league appearances and goals as of 14:44, 24 July 2026 (UTC) ‡ National team caps and goals as of 8 April 2026 (UTC)

Maria Reynolds (born 20 April 2004) is an Irish professional footballer who plays as a centre-back for Women's Super League 2 club Sheffield United and the Republic of Ireland national team.

== Youth career ==
Reynolds played youth football with Wicklow sides Enniskerry and Greystones United and with League of Ireland Women's Premier Division clubs Peamount United and Shamrock Rovers, the latter of whom she joined in 2020.

== Club career ==
=== Shamrock Rovers ===
In 2022, Reynolds picked up an injury that would keep her out for 14 months. On 21 October Reynolds made her debut for League of Ireland Women's Premier Division club Shamrock Rovers in a game against Wexford at Ferrycarrig Park.

Reyonolds would re-sign for Rovers for the 2024 season, during which on 18 August 2024, Reynolds featured in the 2024 All-Island Cup final at Tallaght Stadium, where Rovers would lose on penalties to Galway United.

On 15 January 2025, Rovers confirmed that Reynolds had signed a multi-year deal with the club.

=== Sheffield United ===
In July 2026, Reynolds joined WSL 2 side Sheffield United on a two-year deal.

== International career ==
Reynolds has represented the Republic of Ireland at U15, U16, U17 and U19 level.

On 7 April 2026, Reynolds received her first call-up to the Republic of Ireland national team, as a late call-up for their 2027 FIFA Women's World Cup Qualifiers against Poland.

== Career statistics ==
=== Club ===
As of match played 28 March 2026

Appearances and goals by club, season and competition
Club	Season	League			FAI Cup		Other		Total	
Club	Season	Division	Apps	Goals	Apps	Goals	Apps	Goals	Apps	Goals
Shamrock Rovers	2023	LOI Premier Division	3	0	0	0	—		3	0
Shamrock Rovers	2024	LOI Premier Division	17	0	2	0	6 (Note: Appearances in the All-Island Cup)	0	25	0
Shamrock Rovers	2025	LOI Premier Division	19	1	1	1	4	1	24	3
Shamrock Rovers	2026	LOI Premier Division	3	0	0	0	0	0	3	0
Shamrock Rovers	Total		42	1	3	1	10	1	55	3
Career total			42	1	3	1	10	1	55	3
