= Waterford F.C. (women) =

Women's association football club in the Republic of Ireland

Waterford
- Full name: Waterford Women's Football Club
- Nicknames: The Blues, Blues
- Founded: December 2024; 20 months ago
- Ground: Waterford RSC, Waterford, Ireland
- Capacity: 5,500 (3,052 seats)
- Chairman: Jamie Pilley
- Manager: Gary Hunt
- League: League of Ireland Women's Premier Division
- 2025: 11th of 12
- Website: www.waterfordfc.ie
Home colours	Away colours	Third colours

Waterford Women's Football Club is a professional women's football club which competes in the League of Ireland Women's Premier Division. The club was founded in December 2024, becoming the first-ever women's football team in Waterford. The club is backed by a partnership between Hess Sports Group and Waterford Football Club.

The club play their games at the Waterford Regional Sports Centre, more commonly referred to as the RSC.

== History ==
On 16 December 2024, League of Ireland Premier Division club Waterford announced the creation of a women's team which would be entered into the Women's Premier Division, ahead of the 2025 season. As a part of the formation of the club it was announced that Hess Sports Group would own 75% of the club with Power Grade Limited (owners of Waterford Football Club) owning 25%.

On 20 January 2025, Gary Hunt was announced as the club's manager, having previously been involved with the coaching setup for Waterford FC's men's squad.

On 8 March 2025, the club played their first ever game in senior football, losing 0–2 against Treaty United at Markets Field. Seven days later on 15 March, the club played their first ever home game falling to a 0–4 defeat at the hands of Shelbourne. A week later on 22 March, the club not only saw Olivia Shannon score their first ever goal, but the team also achieved the club’s first every victory with a 2–0 win over Sligo Rovers at The Showgrounds.

At the end of the club’s first season they finished 11th out of 12 clubs, with 4 wins, 18 defeats and not a single draw. Waterford finished above their Munster rivals, Cork City.

== Players ==
=== Current squad ===
As of 3 April 2026

Note: Flags indicate national team as defined under FIFA eligibility rules; some limited exceptions apply. Players may hold more than one non-FIFA nationality.

No.	Pos.	Nation	Player
1	GK	IRL	Maeve Williams (Captain)
2	DF	IRL	Kiera Burke
3	DF	IRL	Jess Lawlor
4	DF	IRL	Meadhbh Doherty
5	DF	IRL	Dan Burke
6	MF	IRL	Leah O'Donoghue
7	FW	IRL	Chloe Atkinson
9	FW	IRL	Lauren Egbuloniu
10	MF	IRL	Mia Lenihan
11	FW	IRL	Fiana Bradley
13	FW	IRL	Izzy Walsh
14	MF	LVA	Anna Kristīne Gornela
15	FW	IRL	Kaytlin Conroy

No.	Pos.	Nation	Player
16	FW	IRL	Aisling Mahony
17	FW	IRL	Blessing Kingsley
19	FW	IRL	Erin O'Brien
24	FW	IRL	Zara Corcoron
25	GK	IRL	Isabelle Carroll
26	MF	IRL	Cliodhna Malone
27	FW	IRL	Kate Tomkins
28	DF	IRL	Caoimhe Carley
29	MF	IRL	Sophie Darlington
30	DF	IRL	Hillary Dumevi
31	MF	IRL	Emma Bibby
32	DF	IRL	Sophie Meagher
33	DF	IRL	Stephanie Dumevi
