= Galway United W.F.C. =

Galway United
- Full name: Galway United Football Club
- Nickname: The Tribeswomen
- Short name: United
- Founded: 2023
- Ground: Eamonn Deacy Park
- Capacity: 5,001 (3,300 seats)
- Chairman: Jonathan Corbett
- Manager: Phil Trill
- League: League of Ireland Women's Premier Division
- 2025: 3rd
- Website: www.galwayunitedfc.ie
Home colours	Away colours	Third colours

Galway United Football Club is a women's football club based in the city of Galway. The team currently compete in the League of Ireland Women's Premier Division. The club is the successor club to Galway W.F.C., with Galway United launching teams at senior, U-19, and U-17 level after Galway W.F.C announced its withdrawal from the Women's National League at the end of 2022.

== History ==
=== Galway WFC ===
Galway teams had competed in national competitions for a number of years, and Galway W.F.C. joined the Women's National League for the 2013–2014 season.

At the end of 2022, the club announced they had "reluctantly decided not to apply for inclusion in next season's SSE Airtricity Women's National League", due to additional costs. Chair Stephan Moran included in the statement the hope "that other individuals or entities [would] take up the mantle to continue the tradition of senior and underage women's football in Galway in 2023".

=== Galway United WFC ===
On 13 September 2022, Galway United announced that they were disappointed with the news of Galway W.F.C.'s demise, and would begin a "process of dialogue with all interested stakeholders" to explore options to ensure Galway was represented in women's football and senior and underage levels. On 5 October, the club announced they would be launching women's teams for the first time, entering a senior team in the Women's National League in 2023 and underage teams at u-17 and u-19 level.

Former Galway W.F.C. assistant manager Phil Trill was confirmed as Galway United's first-ever senior women's team manager on 3 December, saying "I’m delighted to have this opportunity. To be the first ever manager to take a women’s team into Galway United is very exciting". Lynsey McKey was confirmed as club captain, with Jenna Slattery and Therese Kinnevey as vice-captains, ahead of the start of the season.

=== League ===
Galway United played their first official game at home at Eamon Deacy Park on 4 March 2023, losing narrowly to Wexford Youths.

The club finished fourth in its first season in the League of Ireland Women's Premier Division, with midfielder Jenna Slattery being named in the 2023 Premier Division Team of the Year, and forward Jodie Griffin winning the TG4 Goal of the Year award.

The club finished third in its second season in the League of Ireland Women's Premier Division. Julie-Ann Russell was selected as the Player of the Year and Jenna Slattery was awarded the Golden Boot at the 2024 SSE Airtricity Women's Premier Division Awards. Both Russell and Slattery were named to the 2024 Premier Division Team of the Year along with Kate Thompson.

Notably, Galway United achieved a 5–0 home win against Cork City on 16 March 2024, breaking The SSE Airtricity Women's Premier Division attendance record when 2,861 people attended Galway United's win over DLR Waves at Eamonn Deacy Park. It beat the previous record of 1,464 who were at the 2023 clash between Shamrock Rovers and Peamount United.

=== All Island (Avenir) Cup ===
The club achieved success in their debut season, defeating Cliftonville 1–0 to win the All-Island Cup at The Showgrounds, with Gemma McGuinness scoring the winning goal in the final.

Galway United successfully defended their title in the Avenir Sports All-Island Cup for the second year in a row. After progressing through the group stages and knockout rounds, they faced Shamrock Rovers in the final at Tallaght Stadium. The match concluded in a 0–0 draw which resulted in Galway United clinching the victory through a 4-3 penalty shootout.

== Grounds ==
Galway United's principal home ground is Eamonn Deacy Park, previously known as Terryland Park.

The women's team train in Headford, at the home of Moyne Villa. During the 2026 season, the team played many of their home games in Headford as a new pitch was being layed in Eamon Deacy Park.

== Personnel ==
Updated 2026

=== Current squad ===
Note: Flags indicate national team as defined under FIFA eligibility rules; some limited exceptions apply. Players may hold more than one non-FIFA nationality.

No.	Pos.	Nation	Player
1	GK	IRL	Nicole Nix
2	DF	IRL	Aoibheann Costello
3	DF	NIR	Lucy Jayne Grant
4	MF	USA	Isabella Beletic
5	DF	USA	Remini Tillotson
6	DF	IRL	Niamh Cotter
7	MF	IRL	Aislinn Meaney
8	MF	IRL	Kate Thompson
9	FW	IRL	Ceola Bergin
10	MF	IRL	Lynsey McKey (captain)
11	MF	IRL	Aoibhín Donnelly
12	DF	USA	Ella Raimondi
13	FW	IRL	Cara Griffin

No.	Pos.	Nation	Player
14	MF	IRL	Roma McLaughlin
15	DF	IRL	Amy Madden
16	MF	IRL	Abbie Callanan
17	MF	IRL	Amy Tierney
18	FW	IRL	Anna McGough
19	MF	IRL	Ava Mullins
20	DF	USA	Jade Rehberger
21	MF	IRL	Heather Loomes
22	DF	IRL	Eve Dossen
23	FW	IRL	Emma Doherty
27	FW	IRL	Emily Fitzgerald
30	GK	IRL	Amanda McQuillan
71	MF	IRL	Niamh Farrelly

=== Technical staff ===
Position	Name
Manager	Phil Trill
Assistant Manager/ Goalkeeping Development	Adrian Cronan
Opposition Analyst	Gabriel Darcy
Technical Coach	Theresa Keane
Coach	Paul Sinnott
Assistant Goalkeeping Coach	Patrick Martyn
Head of Athletic Development	Fiona Kashmer
Kit Person	Marc O'Goill
Sports Psychologist	Stephanie Doherty
Physiotherapist	Roisin Leen
Sports Scientist	Evan O'Connor

=== Management ===
Position	Staff
Chairman	Jonathan Corbett
Secretary	John Flannery
Media Officer	Jonathan Higgins
Graphic Designer	Morgan O'Brien
Content Creation	Paul Mladjenovic

== Shirt sponsors and manufacturers ==
Year	Kit manufacturer	Main Sponsor
2023	O'Neills	Comer Property Management
2024	O'Neills	Comer Property Management
2025	O'Neills	Comer Property Management
2026	O'Neills	Comer Property Management

== Notable former players ==
Republic of Ireland senior internationals

- (Republic of Ireland) Niamh Farrelly
- (Republic of Ireland) Roma McLaughlin
- (Republic of Ireland) Aislinn Meaney
- (Republic of Ireland) Julie-Ann Russell

Republic of Ireland U19 internationals

- (Republic of Ireland) Ceola Bergin
- (Republic of Ireland) Eve Dossen
- (Republic of Ireland) Jayne Merren
- (Republic of Ireland) Rola Olusola
- (Republic of Ireland) Aoife Thompson
- (Republic of Ireland) Kate Thompson

Other senior internationals

- (Northern Ireland) Gemma McGuinness

== Managerial history ==
Dates	Name
2023–	(Republic of Ireland) Phil Trill

== Honours ==
- All-Island Cup
  - Winners: 2023, 2024.: (2)
  - Runners Up: 2026.: (1)
