= Aislinn Meaney =

Irish association footballer

Personal information
- Date of birth: 24 October 1998 (age 28)
- Place of birth: Ennis, Republic of Ireland
- Height: 5 ft 2 in (1.57 m)
- Positions: Midfielder; forward

Team information
- Current team: Treaty United

Youth career
- ?–c. 2014: Lifford Ladies

College career
Years	Team	Apps	(Gls)
2017–2019	NUI Galway		
2019–2021	Akron Zips	46	(4)
2022	IUP Crimson Hawks	17	(5)

Senior career*
Years	Team	Apps	(Gls)
c. 2014–2017	Lifford Ladies		
2017-2022	Galway	63	(8)
2022	Treaty United	7	(1)
2023–	Galway United	27	(5)

International career^{‡}
2015	Republic of Ireland U17	4	(0)
2018–	Republic of Ireland	2	(0)
2019	Irish Universities		
- * Club domestic league appearances and goals as of 21:31, 21 August 2023 (UTC) ‡ National team caps and goals as of 08:51, 22 September 2021 (UTC)

Aislinn Meaney (born 24 October 1998) is an Irish association footballer, who plays for Galway United. She has previously played for multiple Irish league teams, and multiple college soccer teams in the United States. She has played for the Republic of Ireland women's national football team.

== Personal life ==
Meaney is from Ennis. As a youngster, she played Ladies' Gaelic football for Clare U14, with whom she won the 2012 All-Ireland title for her age group. She studied arts at NUI Galway, and played for their varsity team from 2017 until 2019. In 2019, she transferred her studies to the University of Akron in the US.

== Club career ==
As a youngster, Meaney played for Lifford Ladies, making her senior debut at the age of 16. In 2017, she joined Galway. Meaney was the 2018 Women's National League Player of the Month for May 2018, and was named in the league's Team of the Season. She was on the shortlist for the Player of the Season award.

In 2019, Meaney signed for American Akron Zips women's soccer team; Meaney and Lucia Lobato were the first Irishwomen to play for the Zips. She made 19 appearances in her first season at the club. During the COVID-19 pandemic, she was unable to play in the US and returned to Ireland. Ahead of the 2021 Women's National League, Meaney left Galway. She played for Akron Zips in 2021, and later returned to Galway in June 2021.

In 2022, Meaney joined Treaty United. That year, she also played for IUP Crimson Hawks women's college soccer team, where she played in all 17 matches. In July 2023, Meaney signed for Galway United.

== International career ==
Meaney played for Republic of Ireland women's national under-17 football team, and was part of the Irish under-17 team that beat England 2–0 in a 2015 UEFA Women's Under-17 Championship qualification match. She made four appearances in that qualification tournament, and was also in the Republic of Ireland squad for the 2015 UEFA Women's Under-17 Championship in Iceland.

Meaney made her debut for the senior side in a 2018 friendly match against Portugal. She also played in a 2018 match against Poland. As of 2019, she had made two appearances for the senior team. She also played for the Irish Universities Team in the women's football tournament at the 2019 Summer Universiade; they finished fourth in the tournament.
