= Eamonn Deacy Park =

Football stadium in Galway, Ireland

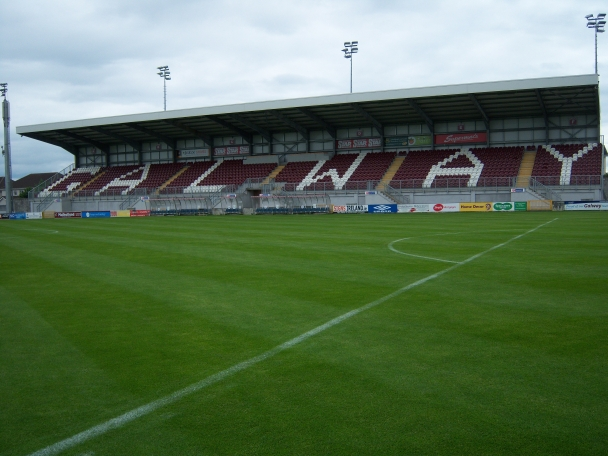
- Interactive map of Eamonn Deacy Park
- Former names: Terryland Park
- Location: Dyke Road; Galway; Ireland
- Coordinates: 53°17′05″N 09°03′23″W
- Owner: Galway Football Association
- Capacity: 5,000 (3,300 seated)
- Surface: Grass
- Field size: 102 by 66 metres (335 ft × 217 ft)
- Public transit: Galway railway station

Construction
- Opened: 1935
- Renovated: 1993
- Expanded: 2007

Tenants
- Galway United (1977– ) Galway United Women’s (2023–); Galway W.F.C. (2013–2022); Mervue United (2009–10); SD Galway (2012)

Eamonn Deacy Park, formerly known as Terryland Park, is an association football stadium in the Republic of Ireland based in the Terryland district of Galway. It is owned by the Galway Football Association and is the home ground of both Galway United men’s and women’s teams. It was the home of Galway W.F.C. before they dissolved in 2022 and were replaced by Galway United WFC.It is named after Eamonn Deacy, a former Galway United and Aston Villa player and Republic of Ireland international. In both 2007 and 2008, the ground was voted the best surface by the FAI. It won the same award again in 2015.

== History ==
=== Early years ===
One of the earliest games played at Terryland Park was on 3 February 1935. It was a 1934–35 FAI Junior Cup game between Athlone Town and a team referred to as the Galway Macks. Athlone Town won 8–2 and went on to win the cup. In 1950 the Galway Football Association purchased the grounds for £250 from Eamonn Deacy's grandfather. (Note: Different sources name Eamonn Deacy's grandfather as either Martin Joseph Morris or Dean Flynn) When Galway Rovers made their League of Ireland debut in 1977–78, Terryland Park became their home ground. They played their first League of Ireland game at the venue on 28 August 1977 against St Patrick's Athletic.

=== Redevelopment ===
The stadium underwent redevelopment in 1993. This saw the introduction of floodlights and saw evening matches at the ground. In 2007 a €500,000 Irish Government grant went towards developing a new 1,500-seater stand. The new stand was opened in July 2007 and raised the seating capacity to 3,300 and the overall capacity to 5,000. Development of the interior of the Main Stand continued as new dressing rooms, medical rooms, showers, officials' dressing rooms, media facilities and other amenities were all upgraded and installed.

=== Tenants ===
Although perhaps best known as the home of Galway United, the stadium also serves as the headquarters of both the Galway Football Association and Galway & District League. It regularly hosts an average of one hundred games per year.

==== Mervue United ====
Terryland has also served as a home for Mervue United. During the 2009 and 2010 seasons when they were playing in the League of Ireland First Division, Mervue played at Terryland Park as their regular ground, Fahy's Field, did not meet League of Ireland standards.

==== Salthill Devon ====
Following the withdrawal of Galway United from the League of Ireland after the 2011 season, fellow Galway based side Salthill Devon re-branded themselves as SD Galway for the 2012 season. They adopted the maroon and white worn by Galway United and switched their home matches from Drom Soccer Park to Terryland Park.

==== Galway/Galway United WFC ====
In June 2013 the FAI announced Galway W.F.C. as an expansion team for the upcoming 2013–14 Women's National League season and they also began to play at the now renamed Eamonn Deacy Park. Galway WFC played in the stadium until they withdrew from the Women’s National League in 2022. Following this Galway United announce the formation of their own women’s team to fill the spot left by Galway WFC. Galway United W.F.C. have played in the stadium ever since.

==== Other uses ====
In addition the stadium has also hosted various Republic of Ireland under-17, under-19 and under-21 internationals.

=== Cup finals ===
Eamonn Deacy Park has hosted finals of the League of Ireland First Division Shield, the FAI Intermediate Cup, the Connacht Junior Cup, the Michael Byrne Cup and the Collingwood Cup. The stadium has also hosted two League of Ireland Cup finals. In 1996–97, it hosted the first leg of the final as Galway United defeated Cork City 3–1, en route to a 4–2 aggregate win overall. More recently it hosted the 2015 final between Galway United and St Patrick's Athletic. This time Galway United would lose out on penalties.

=== Renamed ===
In 2012, following the death of Eamonn Deacy, the Galway Football Association renamed Terryland Park in his honour. The renaming ceremony took place in August 2012 and featured a testimonial match between Galway United and Aston Villa legends teams. The stadium was formally renamed by Michael Ring, the Minister of State for Tourism and Sport. Other special guests included three former Republic of Ireland internationals – Packie Bonner, Paul McGrath and Gareth Farrelly.

In May 2026, drainage works in the ground commenced which required resurfacing the stadium's grass pitch. This was the first major work carried out on the pitch since it was initially laid in 1994.
