= Galway W.F.C. =

- Full name: Galway Women's Football Club
- Nickname: The Galway Girls
- Ground: Eamonn Deacy Park
- Capacity: 5,000 (3,300 seated)
Home colours	Away colours

Galway Football Club was an Irish association football club based in Galway. From 2013–14 to 2022, the club played in the Women's National League (WNL) as Galway WFC until they withdrew due to additional costs. Their place in the league was assumed by Galway United. Throughout its existence the club has been closely associated with both the Galway Ladies League and the Galway Football Association. The WNL team had its origins in the Galway Ladies League representative team that won the 2007 FAI Women's Cup and then represented the Republic of Ireland in the 2008–09 UEFA Women's Cup. The Galway Ladies League and its member clubs, such as Salthill Devon, Galway Bohemians, Corrib Celtic, Colga F.C. and NUI Galway, served as a feeder system for Galway WFC.

== History ==
=== 2000s ===
During the 2000s, representative teams of women's leagues began to enter the FAI Women's Cup. In 2006 a team representing the Galway Ladies League were semi-finalists, losing after extra time and penalties to UCD. A team representing the Mayo Ladies League subsequently defeated UCD in the final. In 2007 the Galway Ladies League reached the final with a team that included Niamh Fahey, Méabh De Búrca and Julie-Ann Russell. All three were also playing for Salthill Devon. On 14 October 2007 at Dalymount Park, Galway defeated a Raheny United team that included Niamh Reid Burke and Olivia O'Toole. Fahey's penalty in the 75th minute gave the Galway Girls a 1–0 win. In 2008 Galway were FAI Women's Cup semi-finalists, losing 2–1 to Peamount United. In 2009 they were beaten 3–2 in the second round by St. Catherine's.

=== 2008–09 UEFA Women's Cup ===
As a result of winning the 2007 FAI Women's Cup, Galway qualified to represent the Republic of Ireland in the 2008–09 UEFA Women's Cup. They were drawn in Group A9 along with Zürich, Universitet Vitebsk and SFK Sarajevo. The competition format saw Galway travel to Sarajevo in September 2008 to play in a mini-tournament to decide who would progress to the next round. With a squad that included Méabh De Búrca and Julie-Ann Russell, Galway finished second after beating the pre-tournament favourites, Universitet Vitebsk.

Pos	Team	Pld	W	D	L	GF	GA	GD	Pts	Qualification	ZUR	GAL	UVI	SFK
1	(Switzerland) Zürich	3	2	1	0	6	3	+3	7	Advance to second qualifying round	—	–	–	3–2
2	(Republic of Ireland) Galway	3	1	1	1	2	2	0	4		0–2	—	–	–
3	(Belarus) Universitet Vitebsk	3	1	1	1	3	4	−1	4		1–1	0–2	—	–
4	(Bosnia and Herzegovina) SFK Sarajevo (H)	3	0	1	2	3	5	−2	1		–	0–0	1–2	—

Source: RSSSF
(H) Hosts

4 September 2008	SFK Sarajevo (Bosnia and Herzegovina)	0–0	(Republic of Ireland) Galway	Sarajevo
15:00 (CET)	Hršum (yellow card) 70'	Report		Stadium: Stadion Grbavica; Referee: Yuliya Medvedeva-Keldyusheva (Kazakhstan)

6 September 2008	Universitet Vitebsk (Belarus)	0–2	(Republic of Ireland) Galway	Sarajevo
15:00 (CET)		Report	Mullins; Fahy	Stadium: Stadion Grbavica; Referee: Petra Pavlíková (Slovakia)

9 September 2008	Galway (Republic of Ireland)	0–2	(Switzerland) Zürich	Istočno Sarajevo
15:00 (CET)		Report	Zumbühl 6'; Michel (yellow card) 68'; Bernauer 76' (pen.); Zumbühl (yellow card) 79'; Lendenmann (yellow card) 90+3'	Stadium: City Stadium SRC Slavija; Referee: Yuliya Medvedeva-Keldyusheva (Kazakhstan)

=== Women's National League ===
In June 2013 the Football Association of Ireland announced Galway as an expansion team for the upcoming 2013–14 Women's National League season. Republic of Ireland women's national football team manager Susan Ronan welcomed the addition of Galway for helping make the league more national. The 2013–14 Galway WNL squad included several veterans of the 2008–09 UEFA Women's Cup campaign including Susie Cunningham, Melissa Casserly and Becky Walsh. Former Galway United manager Don O'Riordan was appointed manager of the women's club in June 2014, replacing Nigel Keady who had overseen the first season.

=== Galway United ===
In September 2022 Galway WFC announced that it would "reluctantly" withdraw from the following season's Women's National League: "We hope that other individuals or entities will take up the mantle to continue the tradition of senior and underage women's football in Galway in 2023." The local League of Ireland club Galway United released a statement on 5 October 2022 confirming that they would take over the running of Galway's women's teams for 2023. Phil Trill, who had been Alan Murphy's assistant with Galway WFC in 2022, was appointed as the new head coach. He hoped to secure the bulk of the existing playing squad for the following season.

== Notable players ==
=== women's internationals ===
- (Republic of Ireland) Susie Cunningham
- (Republic of Ireland) Marie Curtin
- (Republic of Ireland) Méabh De Búrca
- (Republic of Ireland) Niamh Fahey
- (Republic of Ireland) Savannah McCarthy
- (Republic of Ireland) Julie-Ann Russell
- (Slovenia) Maja Zajc

== Managerial history ==
Dates	Name
2013	(Republic of Ireland) Nigel Keady
2014–2016	(Republic of Ireland) Don O'Riordan
2017–2021	(Republic of Ireland) Billy Clery
2021	(Republic of Ireland) Stephen Lally
2022	(Republic of Ireland) Alan Murphy

== Honours ==
- FAI Women's Cup
  - Winners: 2007: 1
