= 2022 Shelbourne F.C. (women) season =

Shelbourne F.C. (women)
2022 season
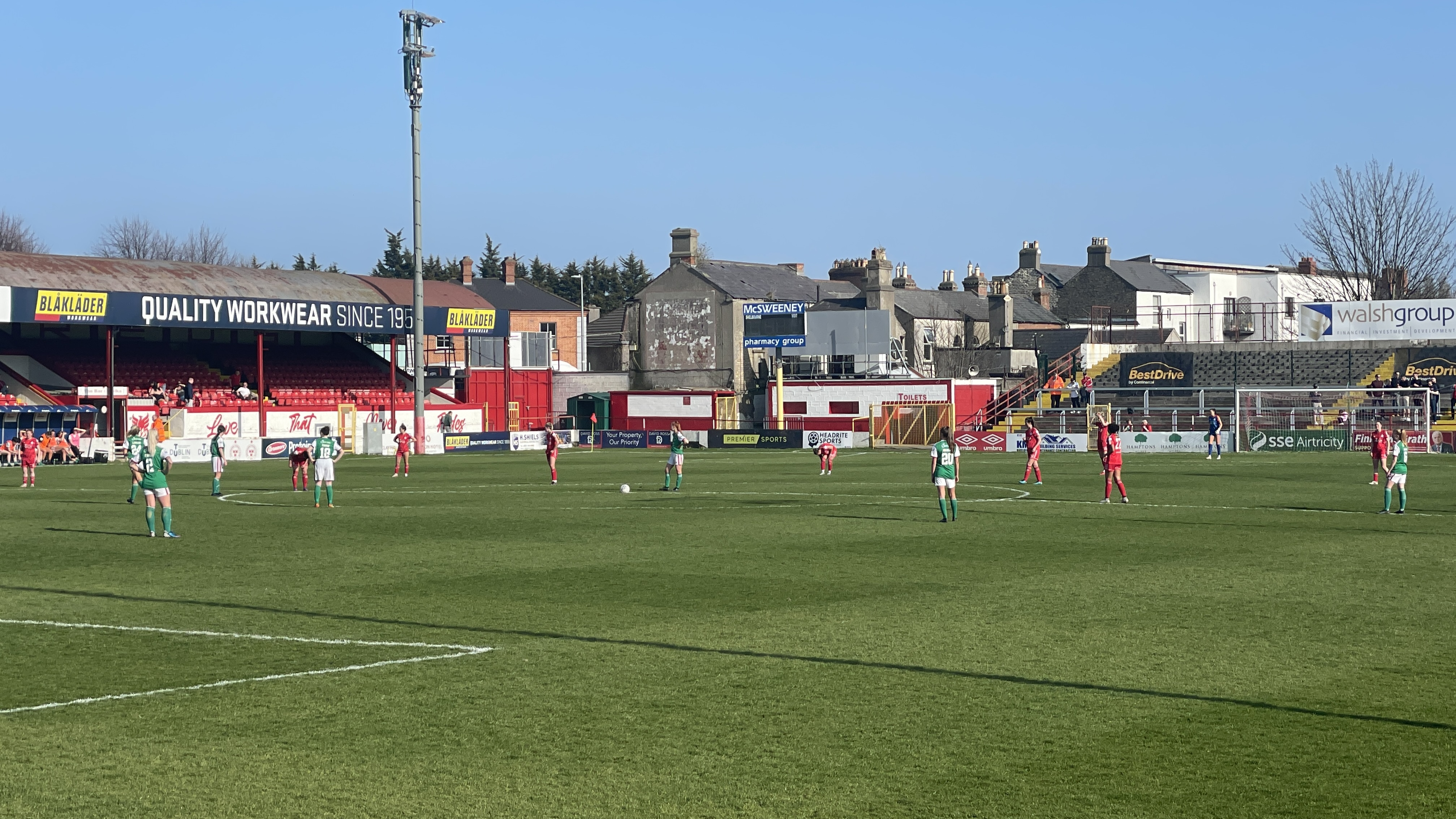
- Shelbourne v Cork City at Tolka Park
- Chairman: Andrew Doyle
- Head Coach: Noel King
- Stadium: Tolka Park, Dublin
- Women's National League (Ireland): 1st
- FAI Women's Cup: Winners
- UEFA Women's Champions League: 1st Round
- Top goalscorer: League: Murray (11); All: Murray (12)
- Highest home attendance: 796
- Biggest win: 10–0 v Treaty United
- Biggest defeat: 0–2 v Athlone Town
Home colours	Away colours
- All statistics correct as of 13:00 7 November 2022 (UTC).

The 2022 Shelbourne F.C. (women) season saw Shelbourne retain the Women's National League title for a second season and complete a double by winning the FAI Women's Cup.

== First team squad ==
Players' ages are as of the opening day of the 2022 season.

#	Name	Nationality	Position	Date of birth (age)	Previous club	Signed in	Notes
Goalkeepers
1	Amanda Budden	(Republic of Ireland)	GK	9 May 1994 (aged 27)	Galway	2021	
38	Courtney Maguire	(Republic of Ireland)	GK	1 October 2002 (aged 19)	Youth Team	2022	
Defenders
2	Jessica Gargan	(Republic of Ireland)	DF	10 March 1997 (aged 24)	Quinnipiac Bobcats	2019	
3	Jessie Stapleton	(Republic of Ireland)	DF	7 February 2005 (aged 17)	Shamrock Rovers	2021	
4	Pearl Slattery	(Republic of Ireland)	DF	11 April 1989 (aged 32)	Raheny United	2015	
5	Shauna Fox	(Republic of Ireland)	DF	Unknown (aged 24)	Galway	2021	
8	Rachel Graham	(Republic of Ireland)	DF/MF	18 July 1989 (aged 32)	Raheny United	2015	
12	Keeva Keenan	(Republic of Ireland)	DF/MF	16 August 1997 (aged 24)	Celtic	2021	
13	Leah Doyle	(Republic of Ireland)	DF	11 April 2001 (aged 20)	Kilkenny United	2021	
Midfielders
6	Alex Kavanagh	(Republic of Ireland)	MF	11 December 1999 (aged 22)	Youth Team	2016	
7	Heather O'Reilly	(United States)	MF	2 January 1985 (aged 37)	Unattached	2022	
11	Megan Smyth-Lynch	(Republic of Ireland)	MF	Unknown (aged 24)	Peamount United	2022	
14	Isabelle Glennon	(United States)	MF	Unknown	Dartmouth	2022	
18	Aoife Kelly	(Republic of Ireland)	MF	Unknown (aged 15)	St Patrick's Carlow	2022	
19	Kate O'Dowd	(Republic of Ireland)	MF	Unknown (aged 18)	Peamount United	2022	
21	Emma Starr	(United States)	MF	Unknown	Galway	2022	
Attackers
9	Abbie Larkin	(Republic of Ireland)	FW	27 April 2005 (aged 16)	Youth Team	2021	
10	Noelle Murray	(Republic of Ireland)	FW	25 December 1989 (aged 32)	Glasgow City	2018	
15	Jemma Quinn	(Republic of Ireland)	FW	Unknown (aged 32)	Killester Donnycarney	2022	
16	Lia O'Leary	(Republic of Ireland)	FW	Unknown (aged 17)	Youth Team	2022	
17	Taylor White	(Republic of Ireland)	FW	30 January 2002 (aged 20)	Youth Team	2019	
22	Gloria Douglas	(United States)	FW	4 May 1992 (aged 29)	FC Saarbrücken	2022	
Players who appeared during the 2022 season but departed before the end of the season
7	Jessica Ziu	(Republic of Ireland)	MF	6 June 2002 (aged 19)	Under 17s	2018	Joined West Ham June 2022
14	Chloe Mustaki	(Republic of Ireland)	DF/MF	29 July 1995 (aged 26)	Charlton Athletic	2021	Joined Bristol City July 2022
20	Amanda McQuillan	(Republic of Ireland)	GK	24 March 1998 (aged 23)	Galway	2022	Returned to the United States
21	Saoirse Noonan	(Republic of Ireland)	FW	13 July 1999 (aged 22)	Durham W.F.C.	2022	Returned to Durham W.F.C. June 2022

== Transfers ==
=== Transfers in ===
Date	Position	Nationality	Name	Previous club	Ref.
12 January 2022	MF	(Republic of Ireland)	Megan Smyth-Lynch	(Republic of Ireland) Peamount United	
13 January 2022	GK	(Republic of Ireland)	Amanda McQuillan	(Republic of Ireland) Galway	
30 January 2022	FW	(Republic of Ireland)	Jemma Quinn	(Republic of Ireland) Killester Donnycarney	
11 February 2022	MF	(Republic of Ireland)	Aoife Kelly	(Republic of Ireland) St Patrick's Carlow	
11 February 2022	MF	(Republic of Ireland)	Kate O'Dowd	(Republic of Ireland) Peamount United	
5 March 2022	FW	(United States)	Gloria Douglas	(Germany) FC Saarbrücken	
16 July 2022	MF	(United States)	Isabelle Glennon	(United States) Dartmouth	
28 July 2022	MF	(United States)	Emma Starr	(Republic of Ireland) Galway	
28 July 2022	GK	(Republic of Ireland)	Courtney Maguire	Youth Team	
29 July 2022	MF	(United States)	Heather O'Reilly	Unattached	

=== Loans in ===
Date	Position	Nationality	Name	Previous club	Date Ended	Ref.
2 March 2022	FW	(Republic of Ireland)	Saoirse Noonan	(England) Durham	June 2022	

=== Transfers out ===
Date	Position	Nationality	Name	New Club	Ref.
5 January 2022	FF	(Republic of Ireland)	Mia Dodd	(Republic of Ireland) DLR Waves	
28 January 2022	MF	(Republic of Ireland)	Ciara Grant	(Scotland) Rangers	
28 January 2022	FW	(Republic of Ireland)	Saoirse Noonan	(England) Durham	
17 March 2022	MF	(Republic of Ireland)	Jessica Ziu	(England) West Ham United	From June 2022
8 July 2022	MF	(Republic of Ireland)	Chloe Mustaki	(England) Bristol City	
7 August 2022	GK	(Republic of Ireland)	Amanda McQuillan	Released	

== Competitions ==
=== Overview ===
Competition	Starting round	Record							
Competition	Starting round	Pld	W	D	L	GF	GA	GD	Win %
Women's National League	Matchday 1	27	19	3	5	66	13	+53	70.37
FAI Women's Cup	First round	3	3	0	0	6	2	+4	100.00
UEFA Women's Champions League	First round	2	1	0	1	1	3	−2	50.00
Total		32	23	3	6	73	18	+55	71.88

Source: Soccerway

=== Women's National League ===
Pos	Team	Pld	W	D	L	GF	GA	GD	Pts	Qualification or relegation
1	Shelbourne	27	19	3	5	66	13	+53	60	Qualification for the UEFA Women's Champions League
2	Athlone Town	27	18	4	5	53	24	+29	58	
3	Peamount United	27	17	5	5	80	26	+54	56	
4	Wexford Youths	27	17	5	5	61	33	+28	56	
5	DLR Waves	27	11	7	9	51	30	+21	40	
6	Galway	27	11	6	10	48	38	+10	39	
7	Bohemians	27	10	6	11	36	35	+1	36	
8	Sligo Rovers	27	6	2	19	32	66	−34	20	
9	Cork City	27	6	0	21	25	82	−57	18	
10	Treaty United	27	0	2	25	5	110	−105	2	

Updated to match(es) played on 29 October 2022. Source: FAI Women's National League, Soccerway, Extratime.com

==== Results summary ====
Overall								Home						Away					
Pld	W	D	L	GF	GA	GD	Pts	W	D	L	GF	GA	GD	W	D	L	GF	GA	GD
27	19	3	5	66	13	+53	60	9	3	2	29	5	+24	10	0	3	37	8	+29

==== Results by matchday ====
Matchday	1	2	3	4	5	6	7	8	9	10	11	12	13	14	15	16	17	18	19	20	21	22	23	24	25	26	27
Ground	H	A	H	H	A	A	A	H	H	A	H	A	H	H	A	A	H	H	A	H	A	H	A	H	A	H	A
Result	W	W	W	W	W	L	W	W	W	W	W	W	D	L	W	W	D	D	L	W	W	L	L	W	W	W	W
Position	5	4	2	1	1	2	1	1	1	1	1	1	1	1	1	1	1	1	1	1	1	2	2	2	2	1	1

Source: extratime.com
A = Away; H = Home; W = Win; D = Draw; L = Loss

==== Matches ====
5 March 2022 1	Shelbourne	1–0	Bohemians	Drumcondra, Dublin
14:00 IST	Slattery 75'	Report; Highlights		Stadium: Tolka Park

12 March 2022 Postponed	Wexford Youths	P – P	Shelbourne	Crossabeg, County Wexford
				Stadium: Ferrycarrig Park

19 March 2022 3	Athlone Town	0–2	Shelbourne	Athlone, County Westmeath
19:00 IST		Report; Highlights	Murray 28'; Keenan 82'	Stadium: Athlone Town Stadium

26 March 2022 4	Shelbourne	7–0	Cork City	Drumcondra, Dublin
14:00 IST	Fox 14'; Murray 37'; Stapleton 39', 44'; Douglas 47'; Quinn 70'; O'Dowd 90+1'	Report; Highlights		Stadium: Tolka Park

2 April 2022 5	Shelbourne	1–0	Sligo Rovers	Drumcondra, Dublin
14:00 IST	Keenan 90+2'	Report; Highlights		Stadium: Tolka Park

16 April 2022 6	Galway	0–2	Shelbourne	Galway, County Galway
18:00 IST		Report; Highlights	Murray 10'; Fox 58'	Stadium: Eamonn Deacy Park

23 April 2022 7	DLR Waves	1–0	Shelbourne	Belfield, Dublin
14:00 IST	Malone 43'	Report; Highlights		Stadium: UCD Bowl

26 April 2022 2	Wexford Youths	0–2	Shelbourne	Crossabeg, County Wexford
19:45 IST		Report; Highlights	Noonan 5'; Keenan 29'	Stadium: Ferrycarrig Park

30 April 2022 8	Shelbourne	5–0	Treaty United	Drumcondra, Dublin
14:00 IST	Douglas 3', 65'; Stapleton 5'; Noonan 23', 34'	Report; Highlights		Stadium: Tolka Park

7 May 2022 9	Shelbourne	1–0	Peamount United	Drumcondra, Dublin
14:00 IST	Stapleton 29'	Report; Highights		Stadium: Tolka Park

14 May 2022 10	Bohemians	0–3	Shelbourne	Phibsborough, Dublin
14:00 IST		Report; Highlights	Noonan 29'; Ziu 58'; Murray 65'	Stadium: Dalymount Park

21 May 2022 11	Shelbourne	4–0	DLR Waves	Drumcondra, Dublin
14:00 IST	Noonan 52'; Ziu 54', 75'; Fox 80'	Report; Highlights		Stadium: Tolka Park

28 May 2022 12	Cork City	0–4	Shelbourne	Turners Cross, Cork
17:00 IST		Report; Highlights	Larkin 4'; Noonan 35'; Murray 86'; O'Leary 90+2'	Stadium: Turners Cross

4 June 2022 13	Shelbourne	1–1	Galway	Drumcondra, Dublin
14:00 IST	Noonan 13'	Report; Highlights	Slattery 72'	Stadium: Tolka Park

11 June 2022 14	Shelbourne	0–1	Wexford Youths	Drumcondra, Dublin
14:00 IST		Report; Highlights	Lawlor 75'	Stadium: Tolka Park

2 July 2022 15	Treaty United	0–10	Shelbourne	Garryowen, Limerick
17:00 IST		Report; Highlights	Quinn 4', 59', 66'; Doyle 9'; Deegan 40' (o.g.); Murray 42', 45+3', 85', 90'; Slattery 45+8'	Stadium: Markets Field

16 July 2022 16	Peamount United	0–4	Shelbourne	Newcastle, County Dublin
17:00 IST		Report; Highlights	Stapleton 23' (.pen); Larkin 80', 85', 90+1'	Stadium: Greenogue

23 July 2022 17	Shelbourne	1–1	Athlone Town	Drumcondra, Dublin
14:00 IST	Murray 90+4' (.pen)	Report; Highlights		Stadium: Tolka Park

27 July 2022 20	Shelbourne	0–0	Bohemians	Drumcondra, Dublin
19:45 IST		Report		Stadium: Tolka Park

30 July 2022 18	Sligo Rovers	3–2	Shelbourne	Sligo, County Sligo
14:00 IST		Report	Slattery 10'; Kavanagh 8'	Stadium: The Showgrounds

13 August 2022 19	Shelbourne	4–0	Treaty United	Drumcondra, Dublin
14:00 IST	Kavanagh 5'; Starr 8'; Quinn 12'; Smyth-Lynch 84'	Report		Stadium: Tolka Park

27 August 2022 21	Galway	1-2	Shelbourne	Galway, County Galway
19:35 IST	Reynolds 73'	Report; Highlights	Stapleton 37' (.pen); Murray 66'	Stadium: Eamonn Deacy Park

10 September 2022 22	Shelbourne	0-1	Peamount United	Drumcondra, Dublin
19:35 IST		Report; Highlights		Stadium: Tolka Park

17 September 2022 23	Athlone Town	2-0	Shelbourne	Athlone, County Westmeath
16:30 IST		Report; Highlights		Stadium: Athlone Town Stadium

1 October 2022 24	Shelbourne	2-1	Cork City	Drumcondra, Dublin
14:00 IST	Cassin 45' (.og); Smyth-Lynch 88'	Report; Highlights		Stadium: Tolka Park

15 October 2022 25	DLR Waves	1-2	Shelbourne	Belfield, Dublin
14:00 IST		Report; Highlights	Smyth-Lynch 9'; Stapleton 15'	Stadium: UCD Bowl

22 October 2022 26	Shelbourne	2-0	Sligo Rovers	Drumcondra, Dublin
14:00 IST	Larkin 3', 1'	Report; Highlights		Stadium: Tolka Park; Referee: Declan Toland

29 October 2022 27	Wexford Youths	0-4	Shelbourne	Crossabeg, County Wexford
18:00 IST		Report; Highlights	Stapleton 45'; Kavanagh 60'; Smyth-Lynch 73'; Larkin 76'	Stadium: Ferrycarrig Park; Attendance: 1000

=== FAI Cup ===
==== Matches ====
6 August 2022 Quarter Final	Shelbourne	3–2	Peamount United	Drumcondra, Dublin
14:00 IST	Quinn 24', 45'; Gargan 37'	Report	McEvoy 9', 13'	Stadium: Tolka Park; Attendance: c.200

24 September 2022 Semi Final	Shelbourne	1–0	Bohemians	Drumcondra, Dublin
14:00 IST	Murray 28' (.pen)	Report; Highlights		Stadium: Tolka Park; Attendance: 796; Referee: Neil Doyle

6 November 2022 Final	Athlone Town	0–2	Shelbourne	Tallaght, Dublin
15:00 IST		Report	Stapleton 6'; Slattery 23'	Stadium: Tallaght Stadium; Attendance: 5073; Referee: Séan Grant

=== UEFA Women's Champions League ===
==== Matches ====
18 August 2022 1st Round Semi-Final	ŽNK Pomurje (Slovenia)	0-1	(Republic of Ireland) Shelbourne	Murska Sobota, Slovenia
17:30 CET		Report; Highlights	O'Reilly 4'	Stadium: Fazanerija City Stadium; Referee: Frederikke Lydia Søkjær

21 August 2022 1st Round Final	Valur (Iceland)	3-0	(Republic of Ireland) Shelbourne	Murska Sobota, Slovenia
17:30 CET	Hintzen 20'; Jóhannesdóttir 45'; Vidardóttir 46'	Report; Highlights		Stadium: Fazanerija City Stadium; Referee: Volha Tsiareshka

== Statistics ==
=== Appearances and goals ===
As of match played 6 November 2022

No	Pos	Nat	Name	League		FAI Cup		Champions League		Total	
No	Pos	Nat	Name	Apps	Goals	Apps	Goals	Apps	Goals	Apps	Goals
1	GK	(Republic of Ireland)	Amanda Budden	23	0	3	0	2	0	28	0
2	DF	(Republic of Ireland)	Jessica Gargan	23	0	2	1	1	0	26	1
3	DF	(Republic of Ireland)	Jessie Stapleton	25	8	2	0	2	0	29	8
4	DF	(Republic of Ireland)	Pearl Slattery	27	3	3	0	2	0	31	3
5	DF	(Republic of Ireland)	Shauna Fox	24 (2)	3	3	0	2	0	29 (2)	3
6	MF	(Republic of Ireland)	Alex Kavanagh	14 (2)	3	3	0	0 (2)	0	17 (4)	3
~~7~~	MF	(Republic of Ireland)	Jessica Ziu	12	3	0	0	0	0	12	3
7	MF	(United States)	Heather O'Reilly	1 (3)	0	1 (1)	0	2	1	4 (4)	1
8	MF	(Republic of Ireland)	Rachel Graham	21 (2)	0	1 (1)	0	2	0	24 (3)	0
9	FW	(Republic of Ireland)	Abbie Larkin	14 (8)	7	2 (1)	0	0 (2)	0	16 (11)	7
10	FW	(Republic of Ireland)	Noelle Murray	25 (1)	11	3	1	2	0	30 (1)	12
11	MF	(Republic of Ireland)	Megan Smyth-Lynch	15 (6)	3	1 (2)	0	0 (1)	0	16 (9)	3
12	DF/MF	(Republic of Ireland)	Keeva Keenan	19 (5)	3	3	0	2	0	24 (5)	3
13	DF	(Republic of Ireland)	Leah Doyle	11 (5)	1	2	0	1 (1)	0	14 (6)	1
~~14~~	DF/MF	(Republic of Ireland)	Chloe Mustaki	14	0	0	0	0	0	14	0
14	MF	(United States)	Isabelle Glennon	0 (4)	0	0	0	0 (1)	0	0 (5)	0
15	FW	(Republic of Ireland)	Jemma Quinn	7 (14)	5	1 (1)	2	2	0	10 (15)	7
16	FW	(Republic of Ireland)	Lia O'Leary	1 (10)	1	1 (1)	0	0 (1)	0	2 (12)	1
17	FW	(Republic of Ireland)	Taylor White	0 (8)	0	0	0	0 (1)	0	0 (9)	0
18	MF	(Republic of Ireland)	Aoife Kelly	3 (6)	0	0 (2)	0	0 (1)	0	3 (9)	0
19	MF	(Republic of Ireland)	Kate O'Dowd	0 (1)	1	0	0	0	0	0 (1)	1
20	GK	(Republic of Ireland)	Amanda McQuillan	2 (2)	0	0	0	0	0	2 (2)	0
~~21~~	FW	(Republic of Ireland)	Saoirse Noonan	8 (3)	7	0	0	0	0	8 (3)	7
21	MF	(United States)	Emma Starr	6 (3)	1	2 (1)	0	2	0	10 (4)	1
22	FW	(United States)	Gloria Douglas	2 (9)	3	0	0	0	0	2 (9)	3
25	DF	(Republic of Ireland)	Leah Riley	0 (1)	0	0	0	0	0	0 (1)	0
38	GK	(Republic of Ireland)	Courtney Maguire	2	0	0	0	0	0	2	0

- Players listed in italics left the club mid-season
- Source: RedsStats1895

=== Goalscorers ===
As of match played 6 November 2022

No	Pos	Nat	Player	LOI	FAIC	WCL	Total
10	FW	(Republic of Ireland)	Noelle Murray	11	1	0	12
2	DF	(Republic of Ireland)	Jessie Stapleton	8	1	0	9
21	FW	(Republic of Ireland)	Saoirse Noonan	7	0	0	7
15	FW	(Republic of Ireland)	Jemma Quinn	5	2	0	7
9	FW	(Republic of Ireland)	Abbie Larkin	7	0	0	7
4	DF	(Republic of Ireland)	Pearl Slattery	3	1	0	4
11	MF	(Republic of Ireland)	Megan Smyth-Lynch	4	0	0	4
12	DF	(Republic of Ireland)	Keeva Keenan	3	0	0	3
22	DF	(United States)	Gloria Douglas	3	0	0	3
5	DF	(Republic of Ireland)	Shauna Fox	3	0	0	3
7	MF	(Republic of Ireland)	Jessica Ziu	3	0	0	3
6	MF	(Republic of Ireland)	Alex Kavanagh	3	0	0	3
19	MF	(Republic of Ireland)	Kate O'Dowd	1	0	0	1
16	FW	(Republic of Ireland)	Lia O'Leary	1	0	0	1
13	MF	(Republic of Ireland)	Leah Doyle	1	0	0	1
7	MF	(United States)	Heather O'Reilly	0	0	1	1
21	MF	(United States)	Emma Starr	1	0	0	1
2	DF	(Republic of Ireland)	Jessica Gargan	0	1	0	1
			Own Goal	2	0	0	2
Total				66	6	1	73

- Players listed in italics left the club mid-season
- Source: RedsStats1985

== Kit ==
The 2022 home shirt was released on 10 December 2021.

Supplier: Umbro
Sponsor(s): Technological University Dublin (Front of Jersey)

Home	Away
