= 2026 Shelbourne F.C. (women) season =

Shelbourne
2026 season
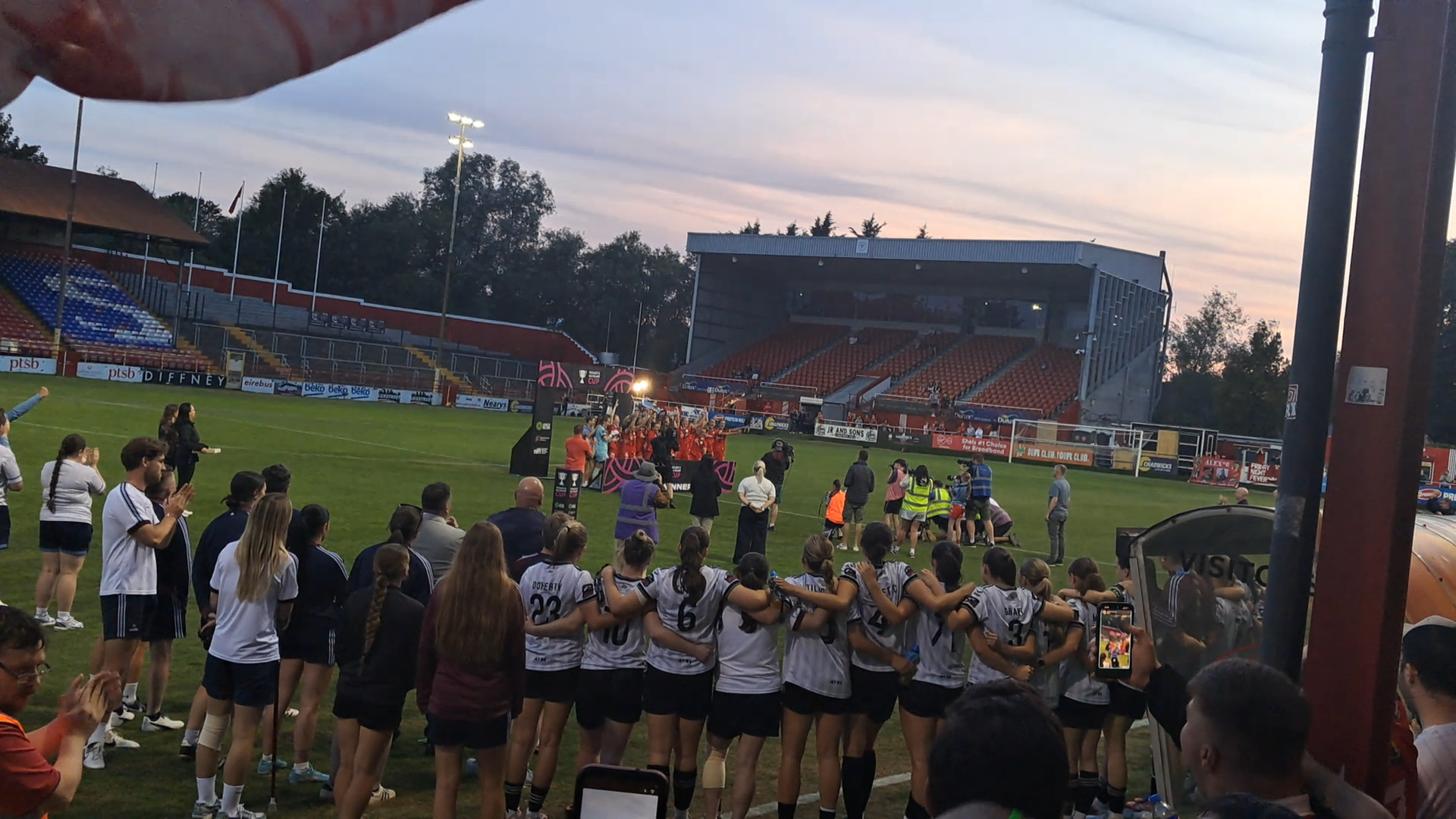
- Shelbourne lift the All-Island Cup after defeating Galway United in the final at Tolka Park
- CEO: Tomás Quinn
- Head Coach: Seán Russell
- Stadium: Tolka Park, Dublin
- Premier Division: 2nd
- All-Island Cup: Winners
- FAI Women's Cup: Winners
Home colours	Away colours	Third colours
- All statistics correct as of 29 Dec 2025.

The 2026 Shelbourne F.C. season is the 11th season for the Women's Team since the club merged with Raheny United in 2015 and will see the women's first team competing in the 2026 League of Ireland Women's Premier Division.

On 20 October 2025, then-manager Eoin Wearen departed the club following the expiration of his contract. Former Treaty United W.F.C. manager Seán Russell was appointed as his replacement.

Pre-season saw the departures of a number of first team players, including club legend Noelle Murray.

On 18 July 2026, Shelbourne defeated Galway United W.F.C. 2-0 in the 2026 All-Island Cup final to win the trophy for the first time.

On 27 September 2026, Shelbourne defeated Athlone Town A.F.C. Ladies 3-1 in the final of the 2026 FAI Women's Cup to win the trophy for the fourth time.

Shelbourne finished 2nd in the league and qualified for the UEFA Women's Europa Cup in 2027. Mya Sanchez, Pearl Slattery and Alex Kavanagh were voted into the 2026 PFAI League of Ireland Women's Premier Division Team of the Year.

== First team squad ==
#	Name	Nationality	Position	Notes
Goalkeepers
1	Mya Sanchez	(United States)	GK	
20	Jenna Willoughy	(Republic of Ireland)	GK	
Defenders
2	Keeva Keenan	(Republic of Ireland)	DF	
3	Nia Hannon	(Republic of Ireland)	DF	
4	Pearl Slattery	(Republic of Ireland)	DF	Captain
5	Leah Doyle	(Republic of Ireland)	DF	
15	Jess Gargan	(Republic of Ireland)	DF	
19	Maddie McKinley	(Republic of Ireland)	DF	
25	Caoimhe O'Brien	(Republic of Ireland)	DF	
Midfielders
6	Alex Kavanagh	(Republic of Ireland)	MF	
7	Becky Watkins	(Republic of Ireland)	MF	
8	Rachel Graham	(Republic of Ireland)	MF	Vice-Captain
14	Maeve Wallmer	(Republic of Ireland)	MF	
16	Sarah McCaffrey	(Republic of Ireland)	MF	
17	Aoibheann Clancy	(Republic of Ireland)	MF	
18	Aoife Kelly	(Republic of Ireland)	MF	
22	Jade Flannery	(Republic of Ireland)	MF	
28	Maggie Pierce	(United States)	DF	
35	Olivia Damico	(United States)	MF	
Attackers
9	Kate Mooney	(Republic of Ireland)	FW	
10	Bella Flocchini	(United States)	FW	
23	Halle Murphy-Harcourt	(Republic of Ireland)	FW	
26	Brie Severns	(United States)	FW	
27	Lara Whelan	(Republic of Ireland)	FW	
29	Sadhbh Hartley	(Republic of Ireland)	FW	

== Transfers ==
=== Transfers in ===
Date	Position	Nationality	Name	Previous club	Ref.
13 December 2025	FW	(Republic of Ireland)	Emily Kraft	Southampton Women's F.C.	
23 December 2025	MF	(Republic of Ireland)	Becky Watkins	Peamount United F.C.	
23 December 2025	DF	(United States)	Maggie Pearce	Carolina Ascent FC	
12 January 2026	MF	(Republic of Ireland)	Aoife Kelly	Wexford F.C.	
11 February 2026	MF	(United States)	Olivia Damico	Pittsburgh Riveters SC	
23 February 2026	GK	(Republic of Ireland)	Jenna Willoughby	Bohemian F.C.	
25 February 2026	GK	(United States)	Mya Sanchez	Oregon State Beavers	
26 February 2026	FW	(United States)	Brie Severns	Miami Hurricanes women's soccer	
3 August 2026	FW	(United States)	Bella Flocchini		

=== Transfers out ===
Date	Position	Nationality	Name	To
6 December 2025	MF	(Republic of Ireland)	Megan Smyth-Lynch	Wexford F.C.
6 December 2025	MF	(Republic of Ireland)	Roma McLaughlin	Athlone Town A.F.C. Ladies
6 December 2025	GK	(Republic of Ireland)	Amanda McQuillan	Galway United W.F.C.
6 December 2025	GK	(Republic of Ireland)	Courtney Maguire	Athlone Town A.F.C. Ladies
6 December 2025	FW	(Republic of Ireland)	Noelle Murray	Athlone Town A.F.C. Ladies
21 January 2026	FW	(United States)	Mackenzie Anthony	Wellington Phoenix FC (women)
16 April 2026	FW	(Republic of Ireland)	Emily Kraft	Mutual Termination
16 July 2026	DF	(Republic of Ireland)	Lucy O'Rourke	Mutual Termination

== Competitions ==
=== President of Ireland's Cup ===
8 March 2026 Final	Athlone Town	1-0	Shelbourne	Athlone
19:45 IST	D. Scheriff	Report		Stadium: Athlone Town Stadium

=== League of Ireland Women's Premier Division ===
==== League Table ====
Pos	Team	Pld	W	D	L	GF	GA	GD	Pts	
1	Athlone Town	22	17	4	1	52	17	+35	55	Qualification for the Champions League second qualifying round
2	Shelbourne	22	12	7	3	43	22	+21	43	Qualification for the Europa Cup first qualifying round
3	Galway United	22	12	7	3	31	19	+12	43	
4	Shamrock Rovers	22	12	4	6	45	25	+20	40	
5	Wexford	22	10	6	6	42	27	+15	36	

Source: League of Ireland
Rules for classification: 1) Points; 2) Goal difference; 3) Goals scored.

=== Matches ===
Win Draw Loss

14 March 2026 1	Shelbourne	2-0	Treaty United	Drumcondra
14:30 IST	Kelly 39', Watkins 43'			Stadium: Tolka Park; Referee: J.Sconnie

21 March 2026 2	Wexford W.F.C.	1-1	Shelbourne	Wexford
18:00 IST	Rossiter 36'		Damico 30'	Stadium: Ferrycarrig Park

28 March 2026 3	Shelbourne	3-0	DLR Waves	Drumcondra
18:00 IST	Clancy 58', Severns 60', Watkins 90'	Report		Stadium: Tolka Park

19 April 2026 4	Shelbourne	1-0	Bohemians	Drumcondra
16:00 IST	Wollmer 91'	Report		Stadium: Tolka Park; Attendance: 788; Referee: M. Patchell

25 April 2026 5	Shamrock Rovers	5-2	Shelbourne	Tallaght
15:00 IST	McGovern 66', Doyle 82', Kinnevey 85', Cowper-Gray 91'	Report	Clancy 10', Wollmer 51'	Stadium: Tallaght Stadium; Attendance: 340; Referee: O.Walsh

2 May 2026 6	Cork City	0-3	Shelbourne	Cork
15:00 IST		Report	Wollmer 49', Slattery 56', o.g. 75'	Stadium: Turner's Cross; Attendance: 164; Referee: K. Pawula

16 May 2026 7	Shelbourne	0-0	Galway United	Drumcondra
16:00 IST		Report		Stadium: Tolka Park; Attendance: 329; Referee: O.Moran

23 May 2026 8	Peamount United	2-4	Shelbourne	Newcastle
17:00 IST	Ryan-Doyle 4', O'Connor 39'	Report	Damico 43', 44', Severns 52', Watkins 66'	Stadium: Greenogue; Attendance: 325; Referee: P. Hayes

20 June 2026 9	Shelbourne	2-2	Sligo Rovers	Drumcondra
16:00 IST	Gargan 41', Murphy-Harcourt 90'	Report	Jordan 66', Stephens 82'	Stadium: Tolka Park

8 July 2026 10	Athlone Town	1-1	Shelbourne	Lissywollen,Athlone
16:00 IST	Scheriff 44'	Report	Watkins 67'	Stadium: Athlone Town Stadium

11 July 2026 11	Shelbourne	3-0	Waterford FC	Drumcondra
16:00 IST	Murphy-Harcourt 12', 25', 28'	Report		Stadium: Tolka Park

25 July 2026 12	Treaty United	1-1	Shelbourne	Limerick
15:00 IST	Penner 3'	Report	Damico 19'	Stadium: Market's Field

5 August 2026 13	Shelbourne	3-0	Cork City FC	Drumcondra
19:45 IST	Kelly 62' Severns 78' Flocchini 81'	Report		Stadium: Tolka Park

8 August 2026 14	Shelbourne	2-0	Peamount United	Drumcondra
16:00 IST	Wollmer 28' Flocchini 43'	Report		Stadium: Tolka Park

15 Aug 2026 15	Bohemians	1-2	Shelbourne	Phibsborough
19:35 IST	Kane 44'	Report	Murphy-Harcourt 45', Slattery 92'	Stadium: Dalymount Park

18 August 2026 16	Shelbourne	1-0	Wexford W.F.C.	Drumcondra
19:45 IST	Flocchini 14' (pen.)	Report		Stadium: Tolka Park

5 September 2026 17	DLR Waves	1-3	Shelbourne	Dún Laoghaire–Rathdown
19:45 IST	Doonan 53'	Report	Flocchini 15' Slattery 73' Hartley 90'	Stadium: UCD Bowl

12 September 2026 18	Sligo Rovers	1-0	Shelbourne	Sligo
19:35 IST	Dunaway 22'	Report		Stadium: The Showgrounds

19 September 2026 19	Shelbourne	2-4	Shamrock Rovers	Drumcondra
19:45 IST	o.g. 6' Kavanagh 6'	Report	Doyle 19', 32' O'Reilly 73' Milton 89'	Stadium: Tolka Park

3 October 2026 20	Waterford FC	0-4	Shelbourne	Waterford
15:00 IST		Report	Watkins 66' Flocchini 76' Pierce 78' Damico 82'	Stadium: RSC

17 October 2026 21	Shelbourne	1-1	Athlone Town	Drumcondra
14:30 IST	Watkins 54'	Report	Murray 10'	Stadium: Tolka Park

25 October 2026 22	Galway United	2-2	Shelbourne	Galway
14:30 IST	Doherty 54' (pen.) Grant 95'	Report	Kavanagh 29' Flocchini 41'	Stadium: Eamonn Deacy Park

=== All-Island Cup ===
4 April 2026 Group Stage	Waterford W.F.C.	2-4	Shelbourne	Waterford
17:00 IST	Walsh 39', Mahony 76'	Report	Wollmer 51', 53' Doyle 57', Graham 65'	Stadium: RSC

9 May 2026 Group Stage	Shelbourne	2-1	Bohemians	Drumcondra
16:00 IST	Watkins 10', Clancy 26'	Report	Kane 40'	Stadium: Tolka Park

30 May 2026 Group Stage	Glentoran	1-6	Shelbourne	Belfast
16:00 IST	Conway 5'	Report	Watkins 3', 81', Kavanagh 17', Murphy-Harcourt 38', 62', Doyle 67'	Stadium: The Oval

13 June 2026 Quarter Final	Shelbourne	3-1	Cliftonville	Drumcondra
16:00 IST	Clancy 18', 39', Watkins 86'	Report	Kelly 49'	Stadium: Tolka Park

27 June 2026 Semi Final	Shelbourne	4-0	Bohemians	Drumcondra
16:00 IST	Gargan 20', Watkins 52', 59', Murphy-Harcourt 93'	Report		Stadium: Tolka Park

18 July 2026 Final	Shelbourne	2-0	Galway United	Drumcondra
19:35 IST	Watkins 53', Slattery 76'	Report	McQuillan (red card) 77'	Stadium: Tolka Park; Attendance: 1,368

=== Women's FAI Cup ===
4 July 2026 Second Round	Shelbourne	6-0	Bray Wanderers	Drumcondra
16:00 IST	Murphy-Harcourt 72', Severns 74', 84', 91', Watkins 78', Wollmer 81'	Report		Stadium: Tolka Park

1 August 2026 Quarter Final	Bohemians	1-4	Shelbourne	Phibsborough
15:00 IST	O'Brien 83'	Report	Kavanagh 1', Damico 50', Slattery 75', Severns 76'	Stadium: Dalymount Park

22 August 2026 Semi Final	Cork City	0-6	Shelbourne	Cork
16:00 IST		Report	Kavanagh 6' (pen.), Hannon 15', Damico 17', Wollmer 25', 54', Mooney 89' (pen.)	Stadium: Turner's Cross

27 September 2026 Final	Shelbourne	3-1	Athlone Town	Tallaght
15:30 IST	Murphy-Harcourt 9' Kavanagh 37' Wollmer 42'	Report	Waesch 90'	Stadium: Tallaght Stadium; Attendance: 2,521; Referee: Mark Patchell

=== Goalscorers ===
Rank	No.	Pos.	Nat.	Player	League	Cups	Total
1	10	MF	(Republic of Ireland)	Becky Watkins	6	8	13
2	23	FW	(Republic of Ireland)	Halle Murphy-Harcourt	5	5	10
2	7	MF	(Republic of Ireland)	Maeve Wollmer	4	6	10
3	21	FW	(United States)	Brie Severns	3	4	7
4	17	MF	(United States)	Olivia Damico	5	2	7
5	10	FW	(United States)	Bella Flocchini	6	0	6
5	6	MF	(Republic of Ireland)	Alex Kavanagh	2	4	6
6	23	DF	(Republic of Ireland)	Pearl Slattery	3	2	5
7	17	MF	(Republic of Ireland)	Aoibheann Clancy	2	2	4
8	15	DF	(Republic of Ireland)	Jess Gargan	1	1	2
8	29	DF	(Republic of Ireland)	Leah Doyle	0	2	2
8	9	MF	(Republic of Ireland)	Aoife Kelly	2	0	2
9	29	FW	(Republic of Ireland)	Sadbh Hartley	1	0	1
9	24	MF	(Republic of Ireland)	Rachel Graham	0	1	1
9	3	DF	(Republic of Ireland)	Nia Hannon	0	1	1
9	9	FW	(Republic of Ireland)	Kate Mooney	0	1	1
				own goals	2	0	1
Total					43	39	82
