= 2026 FAI Women's Cup final =

FAI Women's Cup Final

- Event: 2026 FAI Women's Cup
Athlone Town	Shelbourne
1	3
- Date: 27 September 2026
- Venue: Tallaght Stadium, Dublin
- Player of the Match: Alex Kavanagh
- Referee: Mark Patchell
- Attendance: 2,521

The 2026 FAI Women's Cup final known as the 2026 Club Orange Women's FAI Cup final for sponsorship purposes, was the final match of the 2026 FAI Women's Cup, the national association football Cup of the Republic of Ireland. The match was be contested on 27 September 2026 at Tallaght Stadium between Athlone Town and Shelbourne.

Shelbourne won the match 3–1, winning the competition for the 4th time ever and the 3rd time in 5 years.

The game was broadcast live on TG4 in the Republic of Ireland.

== Background ==
These two sides have met in the final of this competition in 2022, 2023 and 2024, meaning that this was the fourth time in five seasons that these two contested this final. In the previous finals Shelbourne won in 2022 and 2024, and Athlone Town won the final in 2023.

Athlone Town entered the final as the defending champions, having defeated Bohemians in the final in 2025. With Athlone also entering as the winners of the Women's Premier Division, they had the chance to win two doubles in a row.

Shelbourne entered the final with a chance to win a 3rd FAI Cup in five years and win a 4th cup overall. They had also already won a trophy this season, having defeated Galway United in the All-Island Cup final at Tolka Park in July.

=== Route to the final ===
Note: In all results below, the score of the finalist is given first (H: home; A: away).

Athlone Town		Round	Shelbourne	
Opponent	Result	Group stage	Opponent	Result
Peamount United	2–0 (A)	Second Round	Bray Wanderers	6–0 (H)
Shamrock Rovers	5–3 (a.e.t.) (H)	Quarter-final	Bohemians	4–1 (A)
Galway United	1–1 (4–3 p) (H)	Semi-final	Cork City	6–0 (A)

== Match ==
=== Details ===
27 September
15:30

Athlone Town	1–3	Shelbourne
Waesch 90'	Report	Harcourt 9'; Kavanagh 37'; Wollmer 43'

Tallaght Stadium, Tallaght, Dublin 24
Attendance: 2,521
Referee: Mark Patchell

Athlone Town	Shelbourne

GK	1	(Cyprus) Maria Matthaiou
CB	3	(Republic of Ireland) Kayleigh Shine	(yellow card) 36'
CB	33	(England) Phoebe Hampson		(substituted off) 45'
CB	51	(United States) Kelis Barton	(yellow card) 38'	(substituted off) 65'
RM	15	(Republic of Ireland) Isabel Ryan		(substituted off) 65'
CM	6	(United States) Hannah Waesch (c)
CM	12	(Republic of Ireland) Kerrieanne Brown
LM	4	(Republic of Ireland) Shauna Brennan		(substituted off) 45'
RF	19	(United States) Alexis Strickland
CF	8	(United States) Dana Scheriff
LF	17	(United States) Madie Gibson
Substitutes:
GK	13	(Republic of Ireland) Courtney Maguire
DF	2	(Republic of Ireland) Kellie Brennan		(substituted on) 45'
DF	30	(England) Sofia Stovold
MF	7	(Republic of Ireland) Chloe Singleton
MF	22	(Republic of Ireland) Melissa O'Kane		(substituted on) 45'
FW	10	(Republic of Ireland) Noelle Murray
FW	14	(Republic of Ireland) Roisin Molloy		(substituted on) 65'
FW	16	(Republic of Ireland) Emma Mooney		(substituted on) 65'
FW	21	(Republic of Ireland) Hazel Donegan
Manager:
(Republic of Ireland) Lily Agg

GK	1	(United States) Mya Sanchez
RB	15	(Republic of Ireland) Jess Gargan
CB	4	(Republic of Ireland) Pearl Slattery (c)
CB	5	(Republic of Ireland) Nia Hannon		(substituted off) 82'
LB	3	(Republic of Ireland) Leah Doyle
CM	6	(Republic of Ireland) Alex Kavanagh
CM	11	(United States) Isabella Flocchini
CM	18	(Republic of Ireland) Aoife Kelly	(yellow card) 53'
RW	35	(United States) Olivia Damico		(substituted off) 60'
CF	23	(Republic of Ireland) Halle Harcourt		(substituted off) 60'
LW	14	(Republic of Ireland) Maeve Wollmer		(substituted off) 75'
Substitutes:
GK	20	(Republic of Ireland) Jenna Willoughby
DF	2	(Republic of Ireland) Keeva Keenan		(substituted on) 75'
DF	8	(Republic of Ireland) Rachel Graham		(substituted on) 82'
DF	25	(Republic of Ireland) Caoimhe O'Brien
MF	19	(Republic of Ireland) Maddie McKinley
FW	7	(Republic of Ireland) Becky Watkins		(substituted on) 60'
FW	9	(Republic of Ireland) Kate Mooney		(substituted on) 60'
FW	26	(United States) Brie Severns
FW	27	(Republic of Ireland) Lara Whelan
Manager:
(Republic of Ireland) Seán Russell
