= 2022 FAI Women's Cup =

Tournament details
- Country: Ireland
- Venue(s): Tallaght Stadium, Dublin
- Dates: 9 July 2022 – 6 November 2022
- Teams: 14

Final positions
- Champions: Shelbourne (2nd title)
- Runners-up: Athlone Town

Tournament statistics
- Matches played: 13
- Goals scored: 57 (4.38 per match)
- Top goal scorer(s): Alannah McEvoy (6 goals)

The 2022 FAI Women's Cup (known as The EVOKE.ie FAI Women's Cup for sponsorship reasons) is the 47th edition of the Republic of Ireland's primary national knockout cup competition for women's association football teams. The ten Women's National League (WNL) teams entered the competition, as well as four non-league teams. The competition began on 9 July 2022 with the first round and concluded on 6 November 2022. The final was staged at the Tallaght Stadium in Dublin, which had also hosted the previous year's final.

The Cup holders Wexford Youths were eliminated at the semi-final stage.

== First round ==
The draw for the first round took place on 21 June 2022. Gerry McAnaney conducted proceedings, assisted by Paula Gorham. 2021 finalists Shelbourne and Wexford Youths received a bye to the quarter-finals. Non-league clubs Douglas Hall, Whitehall Rangers, Bonagee United and Finglas United joined the eight remaining Women's National League (WNL) clubs. Teams in bold advanced to the quarter final. Sligo Rovers' received a walkover in their first ever Cup tie, when scheduled opponents Douglas Hall, from Cork, failed to fulfil the fixture. Kate Mooney's goal after 32 seconds in DLR Waves' 5–0 win over Treaty United was thought to be the quickest in competition history.

First
- **Athlone Town**
- **Bohemians**
- Bonagee United
- **Cork City**
- **DLR Waves**
- Douglas Hall
- Finglas United
- Galway
- **Peamount United**
- **Shelbourne**^{[Bye]}
- **Sligo Rovers**
- Treaty United
- **Wexford Youths**^{[Bye]}
- Whitehall Rangers

9 July 2022	**Bohemians**	**1–0** (a.e.t.)	Galway	Phibsborough, Northside, Dublin
18:00 GMT		Report	Erica Burke 105' (pen.)	Stadium: Dalymount Park

9 July 2022	**DLR Waves**	**5–0**	Treaty United	Dún Laoghaire–Rathdown
16:00 GMT	Kate Mooney 1', 55'; Avril Brierley 22'; 45' (o.g.); Katie Malone 49'	Report		Stadium: UCD Bowl

9 July 2022	**Peamount United**	**16–0**	Finglas United	Newcastle, County Dublin
17:00 GMT	Alannah McEvoy 4', 8', 22', 53'; Áine O'Gorman 11', 19', 28'; 38', 90' (o.g.); Sadhbh Doyle 44'; Michelle Doonan 58'; Stephanie Roche 62'; Aisling Spillane 66'; Lauren Kelly 74', 78', 83'	Report		Stadium: Greenogue

9 July 2022	**Sligo Rovers**	**w/o**	Douglas Hall	Sligo
15:00 GMT		Report		Stadium: The Showgrounds

10 July 2022	**Cork City**	**7–0**	Bonagee United	Turners Cross, Cork
14:00 GMT	Lauren Singleton 9'; Christina Dring 19'; Aoibhín Donnelly 24'; Chloe Atkinson 47'; Eva Mangan 50'; Zara Foley 62'; Laura Shine 78'	Report		Stadium: Turners Cross

10 July 2022	Whitehall Rangers	**0–7**	**Athlone Town**	Santry, Northside, Dublin
14:00 GMT		Report	Emily Corbet 27', 45', 61' (pen.); Roisin Molloy 45', 70'; Gillian Keenan 56'; Kayleigh Shine 90'	Stadium: Paddy Mahony Park

== Quarter-finals ==
The draw for the quarter-finals took place on 12 July 2022. Teams in bold advanced to the semi-finals.

Quarter-final
- **Athlone Town**
- **Bohemians**
- Cork City
- DLR Waves
- Peamount United
- **Shelbourne**
- Sligo Rovers
- **Wexford Youths**

6 August 2022	**Bohemians**	**3–1**	Sligo Rovers	Phibsborough, Northside, Dublin
13:00	Abbie Brophy 14'; Erica Burke 22'; Niamh Prior 42'	Report	Lauren Boles 51'	Stadium: Dalymount Park

6 August 2022	**Shelbourne**	**3–2**	Peamount United	Drumcondra, Northside, Dublin
14:00	Jemma Quinn 24', 45'; Jessica Gargan 37'	Report	Alannah McEvoy 9', 13'	Stadium: Tolka Park

6 August 2022	**Wexford Youths**	**3–1**	DLR Waves	Crossabeg
18:00	Nicola Sinnott 40'; Ellen Molloy 85'; Ciara Rossiter 89'	Report	Katie Malone 16'; Mia Dodd (red card) 53'; Eve Badana (red card) 69'	Stadium: Ferrycarrig Park

6 August 2022	**Athlone Town**	**2–0**	Cork City	Lissywollen, Athlone
19:00	Muireann Devaney 65'; Gillian Keenan 81'	Report		Stadium: Athlone Town Stadium

== Semi-finals ==
The draw for the semi-finals was made on 9 August 2022. Both matches took place on 24 September 2022.

Quarter final
- Athlone Town
- Bohemians
- Shelbourne
- Wexford Youths

24 September 2022	Shelbourne	1–0	Bohemians	Drumcondra, Northside, Dublin
14:00	Noelle Murray 28' (pen.)	Report		Stadium: Tolka Park

24 September 2022	Athlone Town	3–0	Wexford Youths	Lissywollen, Athlone
16:30	Madie Gibson 2', 31', 60'	Report		Stadium: Athlone Town Stadium

== Final ==
6 November 2022	Shelbourne	2-0	Athlone Town	Tallaght, Dublin
15:00	Jessie Stapleton 6'; Pearl Slattery 23'	Report		Stadium: Tallaght Stadium; Attendance: 5073; Referee: Seán Grant
Note: Live coverage on RTÉ2
