= 2022 FAI Women's Cup final =

FAI Women's Cup Final

- Match programme cover
- Event: 2022 FAI Women's Cup
Shelbourne	Athlone Town
2	0
- Date: 6 November 2022
- Venue: Tallaght Stadium, Dublin
- Player of the Match: Jessie Stapleton (Shelbourne)
- Referee: Seán Grant (Wexford)
- Attendance: 5,073

The 2022 FAI Women's Cup final (known as The EVOKE.ie FAI Women's Cup Final for sponsorship reasons) was the final match of the 2022 FAI Women's Cup, the national association football Cup of the Republic of Ireland. The match took place on 6 November 2022 at Tallaght Stadium in Dublin. Shelbourne and Athlone Town contested the match.

The match was shown live on RTÉ2 and RTÉ2 HD in Ireland, and via the RTÉ Player worldwide with commentary from Ger Canning and Stephanie Roche. It was refereed by Seán Grant, assisted by Ciaran Delaney and Fintan Butler with Ray Matthews as Fourth Official. The 5,073 attendance was a record for a stand-alone women's final in Ireland. President Michael D. Higgins was the Guest of Honour.

Shelbourne beat first time finalists Athlone Town 2–0 to secure the trophy for the second time and avenge their defeat by Wexford Youths in the 2021 final. Crowned Women's National League champions the previous week, Shelbourne claimed a League and Cup "double".

== Match ==
=== Summary ===
After six minutes, Shelbourne took the lead when Alex Kavanagh's left-wing free kick was not collected by Athlone's goalkeeper Niamh Coombes on her goal-line. Coombes was under heavy pressure from Jessie Stapleton, and protested she had been impeded after the ball deflected into the goal off Stapleton's back. Shelbourne scored again on 23 minutes when Megan Smyth-Lynch's inswinging corner kick saw Shauna Fox beat Coombes to head the ball back across goal, where it was headed in from close range by Fox's central defensive partner Pearl Slattery.

In the second half Athlone enjoyed more possession but were fortunate when Keeva Keenan's 49th-minute cross bounced off their crossbar. Scarlett Herron thought she had reduced the arrears on 70 minutes, but her header was disallowed for a marginal offside decision. In the 78th minute Madie Gibson, the American striker whose semi-final hat-trick had secured Athlone's place in the final, struck a clear chance wide of goal as Shelbourne held on.

Athlone manager Tommy Hewitt was unhappy with the decisions of the officials but "immensely proud" of his defeated players. Shelbourne's victorious captain Pearl Slattery was pleased to secure the double and to avenge the "unfinished business" of their defeat in the previous year's final.

=== Details ===
6 November 2022
15:00 BST

Shelbourne	2–0	Athlone Town
Stapleton 6'; Slattery 23'	Report

Tallaght Stadium, Dublin
Attendance: 5,073
Referee: Seán Grant (Wexford)

Shelbourne	Athlone

GK	1	(Republic of Ireland) Amanda Budden
RB	2	(Republic of Ireland) Jessica Gargan
CB	4	(Republic of Ireland) Pearl Slattery (c)	(yellow card) 54'
CB	5	(Republic of Ireland) Shauna Fox
LB	13	(Republic of Ireland) Leah Doyle
RM	12	(Republic of Ireland) Keeva Keenan		(substituted off) 77'
CM	6	(Republic of Ireland) Alex Kavanagh		(substituted off) 90+2'
CM	3	(Republic of Ireland) Jessie Stapleton
LM	11	(Republic of Ireland) Megan Smyth-Lynch		(substituted off) 72'
AM	9	(Republic of Ireland) Abbie Larkin
FW	10	(Republic of Ireland) Noelle Murray		(substituted off) 90+2'
Substitutions:
GK	38	(Republic of Ireland) Courtney Maguire
MF	7	(United States) Heather O'Reilly		(substituted on) 72'
MF	8	(Republic of Ireland) Rachel Graham		(substituted on) 77'
FW	15	(Republic of Ireland) Jemma Quinn		(substituted on) 90+2'
FW	16	(Republic of Ireland) Lia O'Leary
MF	17	(Republic of Ireland) Taylor White
FW	18	(Republic of Ireland) Aoife Kelly
FW	21	(United States) Emma Starr		(substituted on) 90+2'
MF	25	(Republic of Ireland) Lia Riley
Manager:
(Republic of Ireland) Noel King

GK	1	(Republic of Ireland) Niamh Coombes
CB	22	(Republic of Ireland) Melissa O'Kane
CB	5	(Republic of Ireland) Jessica Hennessy
CB	13	(Republic of Ireland) Kelsey Munroe		(substituted off) 60'
RW	5	(Republic of Ireland) Gillian Keenan		(substituted off) 60'
CM	6	(Republic of Ireland) Muireann Devaney
CM	11	(Republic of Ireland) Laurie Ryan (c)
CM	17	(Republic of Ireland) Scarlett Herron		(substituted off) 90+2'
LW	14	(Republic of Ireland) Róisín Molloy	(yellow card) 43'	(substituted off) 89'
FW	12	(United States) Madie Gibson
FW	9	(Republic of Ireland) Emily Corbet
Substitutions:
GK	16	(Republic of Ireland) Bonnie McKiernan
GK	30	(Republic of Ireland) Ciara Glackin
DF	3	(Republic of Ireland) Kayleigh Shine		(substituted on) 60'
MF	10	(Republic of Ireland) Kellie Brennan
FW	15	(Republic of Ireland) Lucy-Jane Grant		(substituted on) 90+2'
MF	18	(Republic of Ireland) Kate Slevin		(substituted on) 60'
DF	19	(Republic of Ireland) Emma McGrath
MF	23	(Croatia) Antea Guvo
MF	24	(Republic of Ireland) Millie Daly		(substituted on) 89'
Manager:
(Republic of Ireland) Tommy Hewitt

Match officials

- Assistant referees:
  - Ciaran Delaney
  - Fintan Butler
- Fourth official: Ray Matthews

Match rules

- 90 minutes.
- 20 minutes of extra time if necessary.
- Penalty shoot-out if scores level.
- Nine substitutes named.
- Maximum of four substitutions.
