= 2023 Shelbourne F.C. (women) season =

Shelbourne F.C. (women)
2023 season
- Chairman: Andrew Doyle
- Head Coach: Noel King
- Stadium: Tolka Park, Dublin
- Women's National League (Ireland): 1st
- Top goalscorer: League: Smyth-Lynch & Hamric (2); All: Smyth-Lynch & Hamric (2)
- Highest home attendance: 333 v Cork City 4 March 2023
- Biggest win: 6-0 v Cork City 4 March 2023
Home colours	Away colours
- All statistics correct as of 14:00 23 February 2023 (UTC).

The 2023 Shelbourne F.C. (women) season sees Shelbourne looking to win the Women's National League title for a third successive season.

== First team squad ==
Players' ages are as of the opening day of the 2023 season.

#	Name	Nationality	Position	Date of birth (age)	Previous club	Signed in	Notes
Goalkeepers
1	Courtney Maguire	(Republic of Ireland)	GK	1 October 2002 (aged 20)	Youth Team	2022	
30	Katie Keane	(Republic of Ireland)	GK	27 July 2006 (aged 16)	Youth Team	2022	
Defenders
2	Keeva Keenan	(Republic of Ireland)	DF/MF	16 August 1997 (aged 25)	Celtic	2021	
3	Jessie Stapleton	(Republic of Ireland)	DF	7 February 2005 (aged 18)	Shamrock Rovers	2021	
4	Pearl Slattery	(Republic of Ireland)	DF	11 April 1989 (aged 33)	Raheny United	2015	
5	Leah Doyle	(Republic of Ireland)	DF	11 April 2001 (aged 21)	Kilkenny United	2021	
16	Kerri Letmon	(Republic of Ireland)	DF		DLR Waves	2023	
18	Leah Riley	(Republic of Ireland)	DF		Youth Team	2022	
22	Maggie Pierce	(United States)	DF	0 August 2001 (aged 21)	Tar Heels	2023	
25	Ruvimbo Mucherera	(United States)	DF	5 October 1996 (aged 26)	KuPS	2023	
Midfielders
6	Alex Kavanagh	(Republic of Ireland)	MF	11 December 1999 (aged 23)	Youth Team	2016	
8	Rachel Graham	(Republic of Ireland)	MF	18 July 1989 (aged 33)	Raheny United	2015	
11	Megan Smyth-Lynch	(Republic of Ireland)	MF	18 September 1997 (aged 25)	Peamount United	2022	
12	Nadine Clare	(Republic of Ireland)	MF	23 May 2002 (aged 20)	DLR Waves	2023	
14	Sophie Watters	(Republic of Ireland)	MF		DLR Waves	2023	
15	Hannah Healy	(Republic of Ireland)	MF		Youth Team	2023	
19	Kate O'Dowd	(Republic of Ireland)	MF		Peamount United	2022	
21	Jenaya Robertson	(Canada)	MF		CP Cacereño	2023	
24	Kayla Hamric	(United States)	MF		Houston Dash	2023	
Attackers
7	Siobhán Killeen	(Republic of Ireland)	FW	15 March 1993 (aged 29)	Dublin GAA	2023	
9	Jemma Quinn	(Republic of Ireland)	FW		Killester Donnycarney	2022	
10	Noelle Murray	(Republic of Ireland)	FW	25 December 1989 (aged 33)	Glasgow City	2018	
13	Rebecca Devereux	(Republic of Ireland)	FW		Youth Team	2023	
17	Taylor White	(Republic of Ireland)	FW	30 January 2002 (aged 21)	Youth Team	2019	
23	Christie Gray	(Canada)	FW	26 April 1999 (aged 23)	Rävåsens IK	2023	

== Transfers ==
=== Transfers in ===
Date	Position	Nationality	Name	Previous club	Ref.
21 February 2023	DF/MF	(United States)	Ruvimbo Mucherera	(Finland) KuPS	
21 February 2023	MF/FW	(Republic of Ireland)	Siobhán Killeen	(Republic of Ireland) Dublin GAA	
21 February 2023	FW	(Canada)	Christie Gray	(Sweden) Rävåsens IK	
21 February 2023	MF	(United States)	Kayla Hamric	(United States) Houston Dash	
21 February 2023	MF	(United States)	Maggie Pierce	(United States) Tar Heels	
21 February 2023	MF	(Canada)	Jenaya Robertson	(Italy) CP Cacereño	
14 January 2023	FW	(Republic of Ireland)	Kerri Letmon	(Republic of Ireland) DLR Waves	
14 January 2023	MF	(Republic of Ireland)	Sophie Watters	(Republic of Ireland) DLR Waves	
20 December 2022	MF	(Republic of Ireland)	Nadine Clare	(Republic of Ireland) DLR Waves	

=== Transfers out ===
Date	Position	Nationality	Name	New Club	Ref.
29 December 2022	MF	(Republic of Ireland)	Aoife Kelly	(Republic of Ireland) Shamrock Rovers	
22 December 2022	FW	(Republic of Ireland)	Abbie Larkin	(Republic of Ireland) Shamrock Rovers	
22 December 2022	FW	(Republic of Ireland)	Lia O'Leary	(Republic of Ireland) Shamrock Rovers	
22 December 2022	FW	(Republic of Ireland)	Shauna Fox	(Republic of Ireland) Shamrock Rovers	
22 December 2022	FW	(Republic of Ireland)	Jess Gargan	(Republic of Ireland) Shamrock Rovers	
22 December 2022	FW	(Republic of Ireland)	Amanda Budden	(Republic of Ireland) Shamrock Rovers	

== Competitions ==
=== Overview ===
Competition	Starting round	Record							
Competition	Starting round	Pld	W	D	L	GF	GA	GD	Win %
Women's National League	Matchday 1	2	2	0	0	2	0	+2	100.00
FAI Women's Cup	First round	0	0	0	0	0	0	+0	—
UEFA Women's Champions League	First round	0	0	0	0	0	0	+0	—
2023 Presidents Cup	Final	1	0	0	1	2	2	+0	0.00
Total		3	2	0	1	4	2	+2	66.67

Source: Soccerway

=== Women's National League ===
==== Results summary ====
Overall								Home						Away					
Pld	W	D	L	GF	GA	GD	Pts	W	D	L	GF	GA	GD	W	D	L	GF	GA	GD
2	2	0	0	8	1	+7	6	1	0	0	6	1	+5	1	0	0	2	0	+2

==== Results by matchday ====
Matchday	1	2
Ground	H	A
Result	W	W
Position	1	1

Source: extratime.com
A = Away; H = Home; W = Win; D = Draw; L = Loss

==== Matches ====
4 March 2022 1	Shelbourne	6-0	Cork City	Drumcondra, Dublin
14:00 IST	Killeen 7'; Smyth-Lynch 42', 49'; Hamric 66', 84'; Devereux 89'	Report; Highlights		Stadium: Tolka Park; Attendance: 333; Referee: Robert Dowling

11 March 2022 2	Bohemians	0-2	Shelbourne	Phibsborough, Dublin
15:00 IST		Report; Highlights	Stapleton 3', 11'	Stadium: Dalymount Park; Attendance: 602; Referee: Mark Houlihan

18 March 2022 3	Shelbourne	v	Shamrock Rovers	Drumcondra, Dublin
14:00 IST				Stadium: Tolka Park

=== Presidents Cup ===
25 February 2023	Athlone Town	2-2 (a.e.t.)	Shelbourne	Athlone, County Westmeath
16:00 IST		Report	Murray 8'; Kavanagh 13' (.pen)	Stadium: Athlone Town Stadium; Attendance: 1,423; Referee: Louise Thompson

== Statistics ==
=== Appearances and goals ===
As of match played 11 March 2023

No	Pos	Nat	Name	League		FAI Cup		Champions League		Presidents Cup		Total	
No	Pos	Nat	Name	Apps	Goals	Apps	Goals	Apps	Goals	Apps	Goals	Apps	Goals
1	GK	(Republic of Ireland)	Courtney Maguire	2	0	0	0	0	0	1	0	3	0
2	DF/MF	(Republic of Ireland)	Keeva Keenan	2	0	0	0	0	0	1	0	3	0
3	DF	(Republic of Ireland)	Jessie Stapleton	2	2	0	0	0	0	1	0	3	2
4	DF	(Republic of Ireland)	Pearl Slattery	2	0	0	0	0	0	1	0	3	0
5	DF	(Republic of Ireland)	Leah Doyle	0	0	0	0	0	0	0	0	0	0
6	MF	(Republic of Ireland)	Alex Kavanagh	2	0	0	0	0	0	1	1	3	1
7	FW	(Republic of Ireland)	Siobhán Killeen	1	1	0	0	0	0	1	0	2	1
8	DF/MF	(Republic of Ireland)	Rachel Graham	2	0	0	0	0	0	1	0	3	0
9	FW	(Republic of Ireland)	Jemma Quinn	0	0	0	0	0	0	1	0	1	0
10	FW	(Republic of Ireland)	Noelle Murray	2	0	0	0	0	0	1	1	3	1
11	MF	(Republic of Ireland)	Megan Smyth-Lynch	2	2	0	0	0	0	1	0	3	2
12	MF	(Republic of Ireland)	Nadine Clare	0 (1)	0	0	0	0	0	0 (1)	0	0 (2)	0
13	FW	(Republic of Ireland)	Rebecca Devereux	0 (1)	1	0	0	0	0	0	0	0 (1)	1
14	MF	(Republic of Ireland)	Sophie Watters	0 (2)	0	0	0	0	0	0	0	0 (2)	0
15	MF	(Republic of Ireland)	Hannah Leavy	0	0	0	0	0	0	0	0	0	0
16	DF	(Republic of Ireland)	Kerri Letmon	1	0	0	0	0	0	0 (1)	0	1 (1)	0
17	FW	(Republic of Ireland)	Taylor White	0 (1)	0	0	0	0	0	0	0	0 (1)	0
18	DF	(Republic of Ireland)	Leah Riley	0	0	0	0	0	0	0	0	0	0
19	MF	(Republic of Ireland)	Kate O'Dowd	0	0	0	0	0	0	0	0	0	0
21	MF	(Canada)	Jenaya Robertson	0 (1)	0	0	0	0	0	0	0	0 (1)	0
22	DF	(United States)	Maggie Pierce	2	0	0	0	0	0	1	0	3	0
23	MF	(Canada)	Christie Gray	0 (1)	0	0	0	0	0	0	0	0 (1)	0
24	MF	(United States)	Kayla Hamric	2	2	0	0	0	0	0	0	2	2
25	DF	(United States)	Ruvimbo Mucherera	0 (2)	0	0	0	0	0	0 (1)	0	0 (3)	0
30	GK	(Republic of Ireland)	Katie Keane	0	0	0	0	0	0	0	0	0	0

- Players listed in italics left the club mid-season
- Source: RedsStats1895

=== Goalscorers ===
As of match played 11 March 2023

No	Pos	Nat	Player	LOI	FAIC	WCL	PC	Total
11	MF	(Republic of Ireland)	Megan Smyth-Lynda	2	0	0	0	2
24	MF	(United States)	Kayla Hamric	2	0	0	0	2
3	DF	(Republic of Ireland)	Jessie Stapleton	2	0	0	0	2
6	MF	(Republic of Ireland)	Alex Kavanagh	0	0	0	1	1
10	FW	(Republic of Ireland)	Noelle Murray	0	0	0	1	1
7	FW	(Republic of Ireland)	Siobhan Killeen	1	0	0	0	1
13	FW	(Republic of Ireland)	Rebecca Devereux	1	0	0	0	1
Total				8	0	0	2	10

- Players listed in italics left the club mid-season
- Source: RedsStats1985

== Kit ==
The 2023 Home and Away shirts were released on 17 December 2022. Culligan replaces Hampton Homes as front of shirt sponsor in a deal running until the end of 2026.

Supplier: Umbro
Sponsor(s): Culligans (Front of Jersey)

Home	Away
