= 2026 All-Island Cup final =

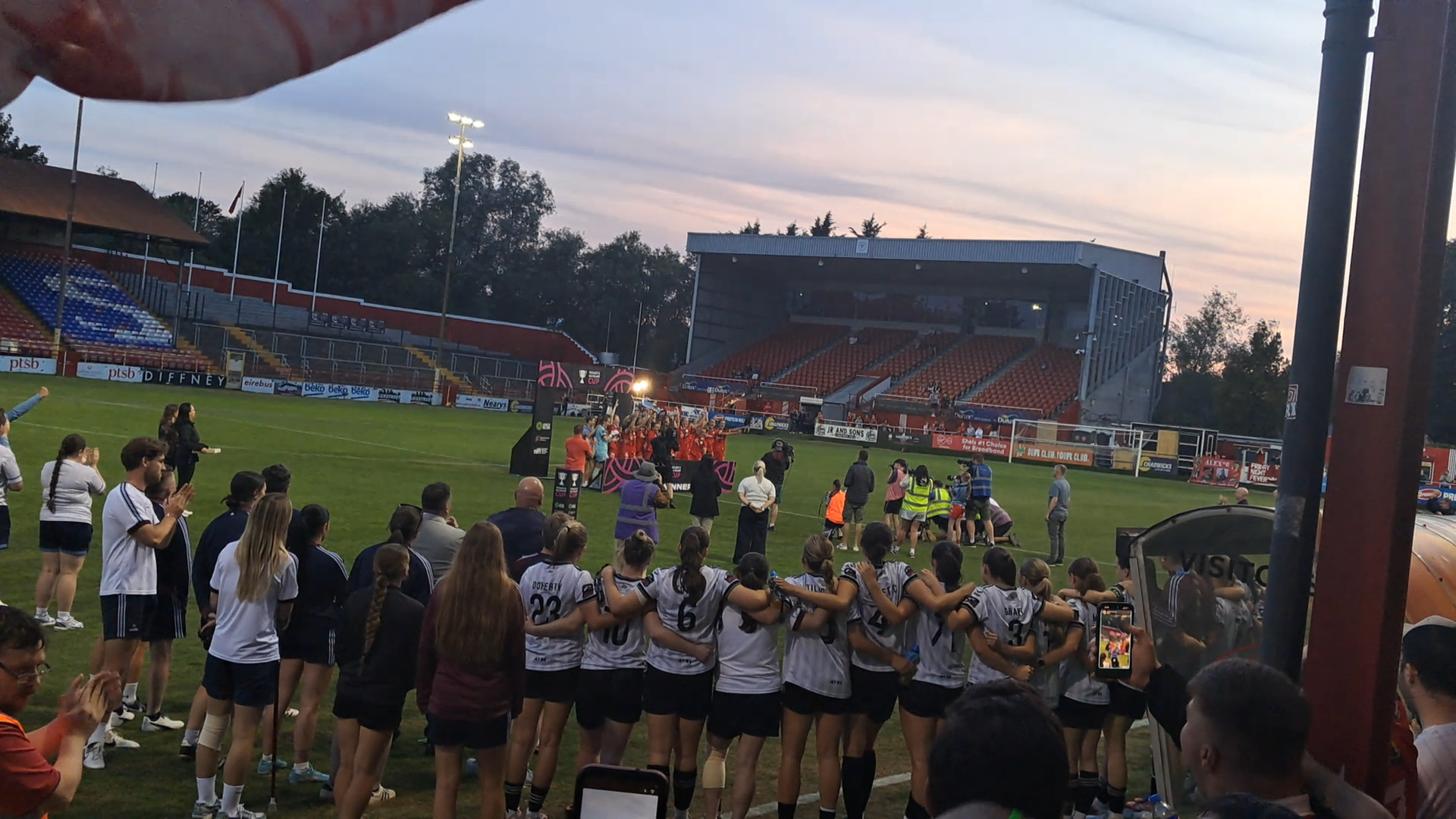
- Event: 2026 All-Island Cup
Shelbourne	Galway United
(Republic of Ireland)	(Republic of Ireland)
2	0
- Date: 18 July 2026
- Venue: Tolka Park, Dublin
- Player of the Match: Pearl Slattery
- Referee: Glen Geraghty
- Attendance: 1,368

The 2026 All-Island Cup final, was the final match of the 2026 All-Island Cup, a knock-out women's association football competition contested annually by clubs affiliated with the Football Association of Ireland and the Irish Football Association. It took place on 18 July 2026 at Tolka Park in Dublin, and was contested by Shelbourne and Galway United. The game was broadcast live on TG4 in the Republic of Ireland.

Shelbourne won the game 2–0 winning the cup for the first time in their history, and ending Galway United's 17 game unbeaten run that season.

== Background ==
The two sides had met once at Tolka Park in the 2026 season, where Galway United's 8 game winning streak in all competitions was brought to an end as Shelbourne held them to a 0–0 draw.

Shelbourne entered the match with it being their first ever All-Island Cup final, having previously won the Women's Premier Division and the FAI Women's Cup on 3 occasions each. Galway United entered the final having twice won the All-Island Cup in 2023 and 2024, winning the first two editions of the tournament. This means that Galway were entering their third final having won their previous two.

Both teams were losing semi-finalists in 2025, with Shelbourne losing to the team they would beat in the 2026 semi-finals, Bohemians, and Galway losing to the 2025 tournament winners Wexford.

=== Route to the final ===
Note: In all results below, the score of the finalist is given first (H: home; A: away).

Shelbourne		Round	Galway United	
Opponent	Result	Group stage	Opponent	Result
Waterford	4–2 (A)	Matchday 1	Peamount United	4–0 (H)
Bohemians	2–1 (H)	Matchday 2	Lisburn Rangers	4–1 (A)
Glentoran	6–1 (A)	Matchday 3	DLR Waves	2–0 (H)
Group D: Pos / Team / Pld / Pts; 1 / (Republic of Ireland) Shelbourne / 3 / 9; 2 / (Republic of Ireland) Bohemians / 3 / 3; 3 / (Northern Ireland) Glentoran / 3 / 3; 4 / (Republic of Ireland) Waterford / 3 / 3; Source: Soccerway		Final standings	Group B: Pos / Team / Pld / Pts; 1 / (Republic of Ireland) Galway United / 3 / 9; 2 / (Republic of Ireland) Peamount United / 3 / 6; 3 / (Republic of Ireland) DLR Waves / 3 / 3; 4 / (Northern Ireland) Lisburn Rangers / 3 / 0; Source: Soccerway	
Opponent	Result	Knockout stage	Opponent	Result
Cliftonville	3–1 (H)	Quarter-final	Linfield	3–2 (H)
Bohemians	4–0 (H)	Semi-final	Peamount United	1–1 (5–3 p) (H)

== Match ==
=== Details ===
18 July 2026
19:35 IST

Shelbourne (Republic of Ireland)	2–0	(Republic of Ireland) Galway United
Watkins 53'; Slattery 76'	Report	McQuillan (red card) 77'

Tolka Park, Dublin
Attendance: 1,368
Referee: Glen Geraghty

Game was broadcast live on TG4

Shelbourne	Galway United

GK	1	(United States) Mya Sanchez
DF	2	(Republic of Ireland) Keeva Keenan
DF	4	(Republic of Ireland) Pearl Slattery (c)
DF	15	(Republic of Ireland) Jess Gargan		(substituted off) 83'
DF	28	(United States) Maggie Pierce
MF	6	(Republic of Ireland) Alex Kavanagh
MF	17	(Republic of Ireland) Aoibheann Clancy
MF	18	(Republic of Ireland) Aoife Kelly	(yellow card) 22'	(substituted off) 79'
FW	7	(Republic of Ireland) Becky Watkins
FW	23	(Republic of Ireland) Halle Harcourt		(substituted off) 83'
FW	35	(United States) Olivia Damico		(substituted off) 64'
Substitutes:
GK	20	(Republic of Ireland) Jenna Willoughby
DF	3	(Republic of Ireland) Leah Doyle		(substituted on) 64'
DF	5	(Republic of Ireland) Nia Hannon		(substituted on) 83'
DF	8	(Republic of Ireland) Rachel Graham		(substituted on) 79'
DF	19	(Republic of Ireland) Maddie McKinley
FW	26	(United States) Brie Severns		(substituted on) 83'
FW	27	(Republic of Ireland) Lara Whelan
FW	29	(Republic of Ireland) Sadhbh Hartley
Manager:
(Republic of Ireland) Seán Russell

GK	30	(Republic of Ireland) Amanda McQuillan
DF	2	(Republic of Ireland) Aoibheann Costello (c)
DF	3	(Republic of Ireland) Lucy-Jayne Grant
DF	22	(Republic of Ireland) Eve Dossen
MF	4	(United States) Isabella Beletic	(yellow card) (Note: Belletic was given a yellow card after the final whistle had already been blown)
MF	6	(Republic of Ireland) Niamh Cotter		(substituted off) 83'
MF	11	(Republic of Ireland) Aoibhín Donnelly
MF	16	(Republic of Ireland) Abbie Callanan		(substituted off) 64'
MF	71	(Republic of Ireland) Niamh Farrelly
FW	13	(Republic of Ireland) Cara Griffin		(substituted off) 79'
FW	23	(Republic of Ireland) Emma Doherty
Substitutes:
GK	1	(Republic of Ireland) Nicole Nix		(substituted on) 79'
DF	19	(Republic of Ireland) Ava Mullins
MF	5	(United States) Remini Tillotson		(substituted on) 64'
MF	7	(Republic of Ireland) Aislinn Meaney		(substituted on) 82'
MF	10	(Republic of Ireland) Lynsey McKey
MF	41	(Republic of Ireland) Ana Conway
FW	18	(Republic of Ireland) Anna McGough
FW	51	(Republic of Ireland) Holly O'Leary
Manager:
(Republic of Ireland) Phil Trill (yellow card) 77'

== See also ==
- 2026 Shelbourne season
- 2026 Galway United season
