= 2026 FAI Women's Cup =

2026 Club Orange Women's FAI Cup

Tournament details
- Country: Ireland
- Dates: 14 June 2026 – 27 September 2026
- Teams: 25

Final positions
- Champions: Shelbourne (4th title)
- Runners-up: Athlone Town

Tournament statistics
- Matches played: 24
- Goals scored: 93 (3.88 per match)
- Top goal scorer(s): Kara Lacey, Charlie Graham, Brie Severns & Mia Wollmer (4)

The 2026 FAI Women's Cup, known as the 2026 Club Orange Women's FAI Cup for sponsorship purposes, was the 51st edition of the competition of the Republic of Ireland's primary national knockout cup competition for women's association football teams. The twelve Women's Premier Division teams entered the competition, as well as thirteen non-league teams.

The reigning champions going into the tournament were Athlone Town.

Shelbourne won the tournament, defeating the reigning champions Athlone Town 3–1 at Tallaght Stadium in the final.

== Preliminary Round ==
The preliminary round consisted of 10 non-league teams, with many of the teams coming from the Women's Development League

14 June	Dundalk	4–0	CK United	Dundalk, County Louth
13:00	Sophie Hanlon 12', 39', 52'; Megan O'Connor 24'	Report	Toyah Hennessey (red card) 17'	Stadium: Oriel Park; Attendance: 50; Referee: David Hughes

14 June	Ballingarry	0–6	Douglas Hall	Ballingarry, County Limerick
14:00		Report	Lily O'Keeffe 27', 57'; Kara Lacey 44' (pen.), 64'; Lauren Murphy 60', 75'	Stadium: The Paddocks; Attendance: 50; Referee: Chloe Kenna

14 June	Longford Town	1–2	Bellurgan United	Longford, County Longford
14:00	Caoilfhinn O'Reilly 57'	Report	Kate Flood 35'; Rebecca Crowley 68'	Stadium: Bishopsgate; Attendance: 113; Referee: Sean Finn

14 June	Whitehall Rangers	6–5 (a.e.t.)	Finn Haprs	Coolock, Dublin 17
14:00	Leah McHugh 6'; Charlie Graham 40', 55', 120'; Isabella Chambers 67'; Faye O'Sullivan 84'	Report	Aislinn Coll 3'; Mollie Page 7'; Alannah Curran 17'; Sarah Mulvaney Kelly 45', 71'	Stadium: AUL Complex; Attendance: 18; Referee: John McCarthy

14 June	Cobh Ramblers	1–1 (a.e.t.) (3–4 p)	St Patrick's Athletic	Cobh, County Cork
15:00	Kelsey Cooper (yellow card) 67' (yellow-red card) 90+2'; Maedhbh Carroll 110'	Report	Mia Donovan 117'	Stadium: St Colman's Park; Attendance: 305; Referee: Bobby Coonan

== First Round ==
The 5 teams that progressed from the Preliminary Round were joined by 3 more Women's Development League sides.

28 June	St Patrick's Athletic	1–2	Dundalk	Inchicore, Dublin 8
13:00	Leah Tighe 24'	Report	Siun Kirby 45+6'; Ciara Brady 90+4'	Stadium: Richmond Park; Attendance: 400; Referee: Jason Ray

28 June	Bray Wanderers	2–1 (a.e.t.)	Bellurgan United	Bray, County Wicklow
14:00	Annalily Farrelly 78'; Rachel Gillis 110'	Report	Kate Flood (penalty missed) 18'; Grace Murray 72'	Stadium: Richmond Park; Attendance: 150; Referee: Michael Kennedy

28 June	Whitehall Rangers	1–3	Douglas Hall	Coolock, Dublin 17
14:00	Charlie Graham 49'	Report	Kara Lacey 2', 63' (pen.); Tiffany Taylor 58'	Stadium: AUL Complex; Attendance: 19; Referee: Robert Redmond

28 June	Drogheda United	1–3	Kerry	Drogheda, County Louth
15:00	Caitlin O'Donohoe 22' (pen.)	Report	Melanie Higgins 29' (pen.), 76'; Laura Falvey 44'	Stadium: United Park; Attendance: 220; Referee: Robert Murphy

== Second Round ==
The 4 teams who progressed from the First Round were joined by the 12 teams from the League of Ireland Women's Premier Division for the Last 16.

4 July	Bohemians	8–0	Kerry	Phibsborough, Dublin 7
15:00	Sarah McKevitt 10'; Eimear Lafferty 15'; Hannah O'Brien 30'; Lauryn McCabe 47', 61'; Lisa Murphy 50'; Alannah McEvoy (penalty missed) 53' 75'; Jane Smyth 73'	Report		Stadium: Dalymount Park; Attendance: 246; Referee: Ruben Collins

4 July	Waterford	1–2	Sligo Rovers	Waterford, County Waterford
15:00	Lauren Egbuloniu 48'	Report	Sydney Stephens 9'; Anna McDaniel 16'	Stadium: RSC; Attendance: 202; Referee: Ryan Maher

4 July	Shelbourne	6–0	Bray Wanderers	Drumcondra, Dublin 3
16:00	Halle Harcourt 73'; Brie Severns 74', 84', 90+1'; Becky Watkins 78'; Maeve Wollmer 81'	Report		Stadium: Tolka Park; Attendance: 261; Referee: Paul Farrell

4 July	Galway United	1–0	Treaty United	Headford, County Galway
17:00	Emma Doherty 7'	Report		Stadium: Moyne Villa; Attendance: 103; Referee: Alan Franklin

4 July	Peamount United	0–2	Athlone Town	Newcastle, Dublin 22
17:00	Eleanor Ryan-Doyle (penalty missed) 8'	Report	Sofia Stovold 67'; Dana Scheriff 86'	Stadium: Greenogue; Attendance: 160; Referee: Darragh White

4 July	Wexford	0–1	Shamrock Rovers	Crossabeg, County Wexford
18:00		Report	Sadhbh Doyle 90+1' (pen.)	Stadium: Ferrycarrig Park; Attendance: 136; Referee: Paudie Hayes

5 July	Cork City	1–0	DLR Waves	Turners Cross, Cork
14:00	Zoe Finnerty 12'	Report		Stadium: Turners Cross; Attendance: 171; Referee: Lucas Keating

5 July	Douglas Hall	2–0	Dundalk	Douglas, Cork
14:00	Clare Shine 51'; Rebekah Grant 57'	Report		Stadium: Moneygourney; Attendance: 200; Referee: Lucy O'Sullivan

== Quarter-final ==
Ties were played week ending August 2.

1 August	Bohemians	1–4	Shelbourne	Phibsborough, Dublin 7
15:00	Hannah O’Brien 83'	Report	Alex Kavanagh 1'; Olivia Damico 50'; Pearl Slattery 75'; Brie Severns 76'	Stadium: Dalymount Park; Attendance: 593; Referee: Alan Franklin

1 August	Athlone Town	5–3 (a.e.t.)	Shamrock Rovers	Lissywollen, Athlone
15:30	Alexis Strickland 26'; Madie Gibson 80'; Hannah Waesch 86'; Isabel Ryan 97'; Hazel Donegan 107'	Report	Emily Corbet 65'; Ciara Milton 90'; Therese Kinnevey 90+3'	Stadium: Athlone Town Stadium; Attendance: 409; Referee: Michael Connolly

1 August	Galway United	2–1 (a.e.t.)	Sligo Rovers	Headford, County Galway
17:00	Emma Doherty 96', 113'	Report	Cara Jordan 116'	Stadium: Moyne Villa; Attendance: 121; Referee: Mark Patchell

2 August	Douglas Hall	0–1	Cork City	Douglas, Cork
14:00		Report	Yuna Go 31'	Stadium: Moneygourney; Attendance: 130; Referee: Shane O'Donoghue

== Semi-final ==
Ties were played week ending August 22. Both ties were broadcast on TG4.

22 August	Cork City	0–6	Shelbourne	Turners Cross, Cork
16:00		Report	Alex Kavanagh 6' (pen.); Nia Hannon 15'; Heidi Mackin 17' (o.g.); Maeve Wollmer 25', 54'; Kate Mooney 89' (pen.)	Stadium: Turners Cross; Attendance: 607; Referee: John Sconnie Walsh

22 August	Athlone Town	1–1 (a.e.t.) (4–3 p)	Galway United	Lissywollen, Athlone
19:35	Alexis Strickland 9'	Report	Cara Griffin 71'	Stadium: Athlone Town Stadium; Attendance: 654; Referee: Oliver Moran
	Penalties
	Hannah Waesch (penalty scored); Hazel Donegan (penalty scored); Roisin Molloy (penalty scored); Kerryanne Brown (penalty scored)		Lucy-Jayne Grant (penalty scored); Eve Dossen (penalty scored); Isabella Beletic (penalty missed); Anna McGough (penalty scored); Niamh Farrelly (penalty missed)

== Final ==
Game was broadcast on TG4.

27 September
15:30

Athlone Town	1–3	Shelbourne
Waesch 90'	Report	Harcourt 9'; Kavanagh 37'; Wollmer 43'

Tallaght Stadium, Tallaght, Dublin 24
Attendance: 2,521
Referee: Mark Patchell
