= 2018 MAAC women's soccer tournament =

- Classification: Division I
- Teams: 6
- Matches: 5
- Attendance: 1,567
- Site: Campus Sites, Hosted by Higher Seed
- Champions: Monmouth (4th title)
- Winning coach: Krissy Turner (4th title)
- MVP: Madie Gibson (Monmouth)
- Broadcast: MAAC.TV and ESPN3

2018 MAAC women's soccer standings
	Conf.						Overall
Team	W		L		T	PCT	W		L		T	PCT
Monmouth ‍†‍‡‍^{y}	9	–	1	–	0	.900	16	–	4	–	1	.786
Marist ‍‍‍	7	–	2	–	1	.750	9	–	8	–	2	.526
Siena ‍‍‍	6	–	2	–	2	.700	11	–	8	–	3	.568
Niagara ‍‍‍	5	–	3	–	2	.600	10	–	7	–	2	.579
Rider ‍‍‍	4	–	3	–	3	.550	8	–	6	–	4	.556
Quinnipiac ‍‍‍	3	–	3	–	4	.500	6	–	8	–	4	.444
St. Peter's ‍‍‍	3	–	6	–	1	.350	3	–	12	–	1	.219
Manhattan ‍‍‍	2	–	5	–	3	.350	3	–	8	–	4	.333
Fairfield ‍‍‍	2	–	6	–	2	.300	7	–	9	–	2	.444
Canisius ‍‍‍	1	–	5	–	4	.300	4	–	8	–	5	.382
Iona ‍‍‍	1	–	7	–	2	.200	3	–	13	–	2	.222
† – Conference champion ‡ – 2018 MAAC Tournament champion y – Invited to the NCAA Tournament; As of November 14, 2018; Rankings from United Soccer Coaches Poll; Source:MAAC

The 2018 MAAC women's soccer tournament was the postseason women's soccer tournament for the Metro Atlantic Athletic Conference held from October 29 through November 4, 2018. The five-match tournament took place at campus sites. The host for the matches was determined by seeding from regular season play. The six-team single-elimination tournament consisted of three rounds based on seeding from regular season conference play. The Monmouth Hawks were the defending champions and successfully defended their title.

== Bracket ==
Quarterfinals; Monday, Oct. 29
4	Niagara	2
5	Rider	1
3	Siena	2
6	Quinnipiac	1

Semifinals; Thursday, Nov. 1
1	Monmouth	3
4	Niagara	0
2	Marist	0
3	Siena	2

Final; Saturday, Nov. 3
1	Monmouth	7
3	Siena	1

== Schedule ==
=== First Round ===
October 28, 2018	#4 Niagara	2–1	#5 Rider	Niagara Falls, NY
12:00 p.m.	Annie Ibey 9', 28'; Breanne Guevara (yellow card) 75'; Amelia Gulley (yellow card) 87'; Shania van Nuland (yellow card) 88'	Report	Kourtney Cunningham 75'; Niamh Cashin (yellow card) 69'; Emily Curteis (yellow card) 72'	Stadium: Niagara Field; Attendance: 168; Referee: Christopher Trottier; Assistant referees: Rabee Naji; Nikola Zdjelar; Fourth official: Ian Boyle

October 28, 2018	#3 Siena	2–1 (a.e.t.)	#6 Quinnipiac	Loudonville, NY
1:00 p.m.	Emily McNelis 48' 96'	Report	Kelsey Goldring 2' (yellow card) 59'; Ally Grunstein (yellow card) 48'; Team (yellow card) 66'	Stadium: Siena Field; Attendance: 227; Referee: Patrick Violette; Assistant referees: Hao Zhong; Jose Quintero; Fourth official: Ron Gescedi

=== Semi-finals ===
November 1, 2018	#1 Monmouth	3–0	#4 Niagara	West Long Branch, NJ
5:00 p.m.	Madie Gibson 5'; Jill Conklin 10'; Moya 23'	Report		Stadium: Hesse Field; Attendance: 274; Referee: Magda Zwierzchowski; Assistant referees: Paul Gryskiewicz; Nabil Alsaidi; Fourth official: Vito Rizzi

November 1, 2018	#2 Marist	0–2	#3 Siena	Poughkeepsie, NY
7:00 p.m.	Kristen Prevosto (yellow card) 24'	Report	Darby D'Angelo 23'; Meghan Riccardi 62'	Stadium: Tenney Stadium; Attendance: 612; Referee: Danny Marques; Assistant referees: Sergio Vasile; Thomas Snyder; Fourth official: Mark Sutherland

=== Final ===
November 4, 2018	#1 Monmouth	7–1	#3 Siena	West Long Branch, NJ
5:00 p.m.	Madie Gibson 16'; Jessica Johnson (yellow card) 33'; Lexie Palladino 41'; Jesi Rossman 46', 48'; Alli DeLuca 50'; Moya 59'; Alexis Marino 73'	Report	Hanna Longendyke (yellow card) 43'; Emily McNelis 72'	Stadium: Hesse Field; Attendance: 286; Referee: Michael McBride; Assistant referees: Nabil Alsaidi; Francesco Rizzi; Fourth official: Keith Fisher

== Statistics ==
=== Goalscorers ===
3 Goals

- Emily McNelis - Siena

2 Goals

- Madie Gibson - Monmouth
- Annie Ibey - Niagara
- Jazlyn Moya - Monmouth
- Jesi Rossman - Monmouth

1 Goal

- Jill Conklin - Monmouth
- Kourtney Cunningham - Rider
- Darby D'Angelo - Siena
- Alli DeLuca - Monmouth
- Kelsey Goldring - Quinnipiac
- Alexis Marino - Monmouth
- Lexie Pallandino - Monmouth
- Meghan Riccardi - Siena

== All-Tournament team ==
Player	Team
Madie Gibson	Monmouth (MVP)
Jillian Colucci	Marist
Victoria Colatosti	Marist
Ida Miceli	Niagara
Hadley Bucken	Niagara
Emily McNelis	Siena
Meghan Riccardi	Siena
Darby D’Angelo	Siena
Lexie Palladino	Monmouth
Dana Scheriff	Monmouth
Jesi Rossman	Monmouth

== See also ==
- 2018 MAAC Men's Soccer Tournament
