= 2017 MAAC women's soccer tournament =

- Classification: Division I
- Teams: 11
- Matches: 10
- Attendance: 767
- Site: ESPN Wide World of Sports Complex; Lake Buena Vista, Florida
- Champions: Monmouth (3rd title)
- Winning coach: Krissy Turner (3rd title)
- Broadcast: ESPN3

2017 MAAC women's soccer standings
	Conf.						Overall
Team	W		L		T	PCT	W		L		T	PCT
Monmouth ‍†‍‡‍^{y}	9	–	1	–	0	.900	15	–	4	–	2	.762
Manhattan ‍‍‍	6	–	2	–	2	.700	10	–	7	–	3	.575
Quinnipiac ‍‍‍	5	–	2	–	3	.650	9	–	7	–	3	.553
Siena ‍‍‍	6	–	4	–	0	.600	11	–	8	–	0	.579
Marist ‍‍‍	5	–	3	–	2	.600	8	–	8	–	3	.500
Rider ‍‍‍	4	–	3	–	3	.550	5	–	10	–	3	.361
Fairfield ‍‍‍	4	–	5	–	1	.450	6	–	9	–	2	.412
Niagara ‍‍‍	3	–	6	–	1	.350	7	–	9	–	3	.447
Canisius ‍‍‍	2	–	6	–	2	.300	7	–	8	–	3	.472
Iona ‍‍‍	2	–	7	–	1	.250	3	–	14	–	3	.225
Saint Peter's ‍‍‍	1	–	8	–	1	.150	3	–	13	–	1	.206
† – Conference champion ‡ – 2017 MAAC Tournament champion y – Invited to the NCAA Tournament; As of November 10, 2017; Rankings from United Soccer Coaches Poll; Source:MAAC

The 2017 MAAC women's soccer tournament was the postseason women's soccer tournament for the Metro Atlantic Athletic Conference held from October 28 through November 1, 2017. The ten-match tournament took place at ESPN Wide World of Sports Complex in Lake Buena Vista, Florida. The eleven-team single-elimination tournament consisted of four rounds based on seeding from regular season conference play. The Monmouth Hawks were the defending champions and successfully defended their title.

== Bracket ==
First round Saturday, October 28
8	Niagara	0 (4)
9	Canisius	0 (3)
7	Fairfield	1 (4)
10	Iona	1 (5)
6	Rider	3
11	Saint Peter's	1

Quarterfinals; Sunday, October 29
1	Monmouth	1
8	Niagara	0
4	Siena	1
5	Marist	0
2	Manhattan	6
10	Iona	0
3	Quinnipiac	3
6	Rider	1

Semifinals; Tuesday, October 31
1	Monmouth	3
4	Siena	1
2	Manhattan	3
3	Quinnipiac	2

Championship; Wednesday, November 1
1	Monmouth	5
2	Manhattan	1

== Schedule ==
=== First Round ===
October 28, 2017	#6 Rider	3–1	#11 Saint Peter's	Lake Buena Vista, Florida
11:00 a.m. EDT	Valeria Pascuet 28'; Ellie Smith 32'; Meghan McCabe 48'	Report	Brooke Trotta 86'	Stadium: ESPN Wide World of Sports Complex, Field 17; Referee: Tony Baumert; Assistant referees: Eddie Fiumara; Dante Buckley; Fourth official: Edinson Aragon

October 28, 2017	#7 Fairfield	1–1 (a.e.t.) (4–5 p)	#10 Iona	Lake Buena Vista, Florida
12:30 p.m. EDT	Alex Madden 27'	Report	Marissa Dundas 81'	Stadium: ESPN Wide World of Sports Complex, Field 18; Attendance: 125; Referee: Alex Sorondo; Assistant referees: Abdel Kuttaineh; Alex DeRostaing; Fourth official: Michel Catin
	Penalties
	Holly Habyan (penalty scored); Jenn Wahlig (penalty scored); Alex Madden (penalty missed); Mel Hingher (penalty scored); Gabby Diodati (penalty scored)		(penalty scored) Charlotte Stuart; (penalty scored) Mariana Jaramillo; (penalty scored) Kelsie Kearns; (penalty scored) Julia Campagna; (penalty scored) Marisa Bentley

October 28, 2017	#8 Niagara	0–0 (a.e.t.) (4–3 p)	#9 Canisius	Lake Buena Vista, Florida
2:00 p.m. EDT		Report		Stadium: ESPN Wide World of Sports Complex, Field 17; Referee: Hassan Belmnahia; Assistant referees: Hevert Castano; Albert Escovar; Fourth official: Julio Noboa
	Penalties
	Naomi Giovino (penalty scored); Bayley Sullivan (penalty scored); Kelsey Araujo (penalty scored); Selena Mangoni (penalty scored); Hailey Bicknell (penalty missed)		(penalty scored) Gretta Dry; (penalty scored) Bailey Fenwick-Miller; (penalty scored) Madeline Beaulieu; (penalty missed) Emily Czechowski; (penalty missed) Maddie Good

=== Quarterfinals ===
October 29, 2017	#3 Quinnipiac	3–1	#6 Rider	Lake Buena Vista, Florida
11:00 a.m. EDT	Nadya Gill 6', 80'; Al Pelletier 84'	Report	Cameron Santers 37'	Stadium: ESPN Wide World of Sports Complex, Field 18; Attendance: 100; Referee: Hassan Belmnahia; Assistant referees: Charles Hufham; Chris Beaulac; Fourth official: Sam Gillispie

October 29, 2017	#2 Manhattan	6–0	#10 Iona	Lake Buena Vista, Florida
11:15 a.m. EDT	Erica Modena 10', 61'; Nicole Aylmer 11'; Emma Saul 54'; Lindsey Healy 81'; Annie Doerr 86'	Report		Stadium: ESPN Wide World of Sports Complex, Field 17; Referee: Kevin Flynn; Assistant referees: Sergio Virviescas; Albert Escovar; Fourth official: Elvis Osmanovic

October 29, 2017	#4 Siena	1–0	#5 Marist	Lake Buena Vista, Florida
2:00 p.m. EDT	Madison Vasquez 53'	Report		Stadium: ESPN Wide World of Sports Complex, Field 18; Referee: Esteban Rosano; Assistant referees: Michel Catin; Julio Noboa; Fourth official: Edinson Aragon

October 29, 2017	#1 Monmouth	1–0	#8 Niagara	Lake Buena Vista, Florida
2:15 p.m. EDT	Madie Gibson 84'	Report		Stadium: ESPN Wide World of Sports Complex, Field 17; Referee: Daniel Gutierrez; Assistant referees: Elvis Osmanovic; Alex DeRostaing; Fourth official: Hassan Belmnahia

=== Semifinals ===
October 31, 2017	#1 Monmouth	3–1	#4 Siena	Lake Buena Vista, Florida
11:00 a.m. EDT	Lexi Palladino 55', 77'; Madie Gibson 78'	Report	9' Madi Belvito	Stadium: ESPN Wide World of Sports Complex, Field 17; Attendance: 391; Referee: Hassan Belmnahia; Assistant referees: Michel Catin; Albert Escovar; Fourth official: Kevin Flynn

October 31, 2017	#2 Manhattan	3–2	#3 Quinnipiac	Lake Buena Vista, Florida
2:00 p.m. EDT	Erica Modena 3'; Arianna Montefusco 10', 27'	Report	34' Hannah Reiter; 72' Madison Borowiec	Stadium: ESPN Wide World of Sports Complex, Field 17; Attendance: 391; Referee: Tony Baumert; Assistant referees: Sam Gillispie; Charles Hufham; Fourth official: Kevin Flynn

=== Final ===
November 1, 2017	#1 Monmouth	5–1	#2 Manhattan	Lake Buena Vista, Florida
12:00 p.m. EDT	Alli DeLuca 38'; Rachelle Ross 51'; Jazlyn Moya 69'; Jessica Johnson 71'; Madie Gibson 72'	Report	78' Annie Doerr	Stadium: ESPN Wide World of Sports Complex, Field 17; Attendance: 151; Referee: Alex Sorondo; Assistant referees: Hevert Castano; Esteban Rosano; Fourth official: Hassan Belmnahia

== Statistics ==
=== Goalscorers ===
3 Goals

- Madie Gibson - Monmouth
- Erica Modena - Manhattan

2 Goals

- Annie Doerr - Manhattan
- Nadya Gill - Quinnipiac
- Arianna Montefusco - Manhattan
- Lexi Palladino - Monmouth

1 Goal

- Nicole Aylmer - Manhattan
- Madi Belvito - Siena
- Madison Borowiec - Quinnipiac
- Alli DeLuca - Monmouth
- Marissa Dundas - Iona
- Lindsey Healy - Manhattan
- Jessica Johnson - Monmouth
- Alex Madden - Fairfield
- Meghan McCabe - Rider
- Jazlyn Moya - Monmouth
- Valeria Pascuet - Rider
- Al Pelletier - Quinnipiac
- Hannah Reiter - Quinnipiac
- Rachelle Ross - Monmouth
- Cameron Santers - Rider
- Emma Saul - Manhattan
- Ellie Smith - Rider
- Brooke Trotta - St. Peter's
- Madison Vasquez - Siena

== See also ==
- 2017 MAAC Men's Soccer Tournament
