= Jazlyn =

Jazlyn is a feminine given name. Notable people with the name include:

- Jazlyn Moya (born 1997), American-born Peruvian-Dominican footballer
- Jazlyn Oviedo (born 2002), American footballer
