= 2019 MAAC women's soccer tournament =

- Classification: Division I
- Teams: 6
- Matches: 5
- Attendance: 1,091
- Site: Campus Sites, Hosted by Higher Seed
- Champions: Monmouth (5th title)
- Winning coach: Krissy Turner (5th title)
- MVP: Sarina Jones (Monmouth)
- Broadcast: ESPN+

2019 MAAC women's soccer standings
| | Conf. | | | | | | Overall |
| Team | W | | L | | T | PCT | W | | L | | T | PCT |
|---|---|---|---|---|---|---|---|---|---|---|---|---|
| Monmouth ‍†‍‡‍^{y} | 10 | – | 0 | – | 0 | 1.000 | 14 | – | 2 | – | 3 | .816 |
| Fairfield ‍‍‍ | 7 | – | 2 | – | 1 | .750 | 11 | – | 6 | – | 3 | .625 |
| Rider ‍‍‍ | 5 | – | 3 | – | 2 | .600 | 8 | – | 6 | – | 4 | .556 |
| Quinnipiac ‍‍‍ | 5 | – | 4 | – | 1 | .550 | 10 | – | 8 | – | 1 | .553 |
| Marist ‍‍‍ | 5 | – | 4 | – | 1 | .550 | 8 | – | 10 | – | 1 | .447 |
| Niagara ‍‍‍ | 4 | – | 5 | – | 1 | .450 | 9 | – | 8 | – | 2 | .526 |
| Iona ‍‍‍ | 4 | – | 5 | – | 1 | .450 | 7 | – | 11 | – | 2 | .400 |
| Manhattan ‍‍‍ | 3 | – | 5 | – | 2 | .400 | 4 | – | 11 | – | 2 | .294 |
| Canisius ‍‍‍ | 2 | – | 6 | – | 2 | .300 | 7 | – | 8 | – | 2 | .471 |
| Siena ‍‍‍ | 2 | – | 6 | – | 2 | .300 | 4 | – | 11 | – | 4 | .316 |
| St. Peter's ‍‍‍ | 1 | – | 8 | – | 1 | .150 | 3 | – | 13 | – | 1 | .206 |
† – Conference champion ‡ – 2019 MAAC Tournament champion y – Invited to the NCAA tournament As of December 9, 2019; Rankings from United Soccer Coaches Poll; Source:MAAC

The 2019 MAAC women's soccer tournament was the postseason women's soccer tournament for the Metro Atlantic Athletic Conference held from November 3 through November 10, 2019. The five-match tournament took place at campus sites, with the higher seed hosting matches. The host for the matches was determined by seeding from regular season play. The six-team single-elimination tournament consisted of three rounds based on seeding from regular season conference play. The Monmouth Hawks were the defending champions and successfully defended their title, defeating the Fairfield Stags 6–0 in the final. This is the fourth consecutive title for Monmouth and 5th overall. The title is also the 5th for head coach Krissy Turner.

== Bracket ==
Quarterfinals; Sunday, Nov. 3
3 | Rider | 1
6 | Niagara | 2
4 | Marist | 2
5 | Quinnipiac | 3

Semifinals; Thursday, Nov. 7
1 | Monmouth | 3
6 | Niagara | 0
2 | Fairfield | 1
5 | Quinnipiac | 0

Final; Sunday, Nov. 10
1 | Monmouth | 6
2 | Fairfield | 0

== Schedule ==
=== First Round ===
| November 3, 2019 | #4 Marist | 2–3 | #5 Quinnipiac | Poughkeepsie, NY |
| 1:00 p.m. | Victoria Colatosti 32', 65'; Team (yellow card) 86'; Jillian Colucci (yellow card) 86' | Report | 65', 70' Selena Salas; (yellow card) 68' Rosie Weaver; 84' Gretchen Kron | Stadium: Leonidoff Field; Attendance: 328; Referee: Bruno Mozzo; Assistant referees: Ernest Zielinski; Alessandro Verace; Fourth official: Mark Sutherland |

| November 3, 2019 | #3 Rider | 1–2 | #6 Niagara | Lawrenceville, NJ |
| 4:00 p.m. | Ailis Martin 45' | Report | (yellow card) 33' Ida Miceli; 34', 68' Kelsey Araujo | Stadium: Ben Cohen Field; Attendance: 0 Referee: Rob Caramanno; Assistant referees: Larry Urweiler; Philip Benson |

=== Semifinals ===
| November 7, 2019 | #1 Monmouth | 3–0 | #6 Niagara | West Long Branch, NJ |
| 5:00 p.m. | Jesi Rossman 42'; Sarina Jones 45'; Lauren Karabin 79' | Report | | Stadium: Hesse Field; Attendance: 183; Referee: David Breckner; Assistant referees: Stephen Cope; Gregg Solomon |

| November 7, 2019 | #2 Fairfield | 1–0 | #5 Quinnipiac | Fairfield, CT |
| 7:00 p.m. | Gabby Diodati 77' | Report | (yellow card) 33' Markela Bejleri | Stadium: Lessing Field; Attendance: 237; Referee: Mike Lee; Assistant referees: Victor Borges; Bill Guarini; Fourth official: Angelo Napolitano |

=== Final ===
| November 10, 2019 | #1 Monmouth | 6–0 | #2 Fairfield | West Long Branch, NJ |
| 4:00 p.m. | Lauren Karabin 13', 33'; Jill Conklin 44'; Madie Gibson 53', 68'; Lexie Palladino 68' | Report | | Stadium: Hesse Field; Attendance: 343; Referee: John Barr; Assistant referees: Salvatore Sparacino; Daniel Caron; Fourth official: Keith Fisher |

== Statistics ==
=== Goalscorers ===
3 Goals

- Lauren Karabin (Monmouth)

2 Goals

- Kelsey Araujo (Niagara)
- Victoria Colatosi (Marist)
- Madie Gibson (Monmouth)
- Selena Salas (Quinnipiac)

1 Goal

- Jill Conklin (Monmouth)
- Gabby Diodati (Fairfield)
- Sarina Jones (Monmouth)
- Gretchen Kron (Quinnipiac)
- Ailis Martin (Rider)
- Lexie Palladino (Monmouth)
- Jesi Rossman (Monmouth)

== All-Tournament team ==
| Player | Team |
|---|---|
| **Sarina Jones** | Monmouth |
| Jess Johnson | Monmouth |
| Lauren Karabin | Monmouth |
| Jill Conklin | Monmouth |
| Gabby Diodati | Fairfield |
| Melanie Hingher | Fairfield |
| Josie Horosky | Fairfield |
| Ally Grunstein | Quinnipiac |
| Kylie Lance | Quinnipiac |
| Hailey Bicknell | Niagara |
| Ida Miceli | Niagara |

MVP in bold
