= Gerry McAnaney =

Football administrator

President of Football Association of Ireland
- Incumbent
- Assumed office February 2020
- Preceded by: Donal Conway

Personal details
- Born: 1958 (age 67–68) Dublin
- Education: Templeogue College
- Occupation: Senior Sports Administrator, Army Officer

Military service
- Allegiance: Ireland
- Branch/service: Irish Military
- Years of service: 1978-2002

Gerry McAnaney (born 1958) is an Irish football administrator who was elected president of Football Association of Ireland, succeeding Donal Conway.

== Background ==
Gerry was born in Dublin and grew up in Rathfarnham, Dublin. He attended Templeogue College and as a goalkeeper, McAnaney represented Ireland at U15 level, in a team that included David O'Leary and Ashley Grimes (footballer, born 1957). He represented Albert Rovers F.C., Tramore Athletic F.C., Cobh Ramblers, Cork City F.C., and College Corinthians A.F.C.

He later joined the military which he served as regional director of Military Police and tours of duty with the United Nations in Lebanon till he held a position of commandant in the Defence Forces.

Prior to becoming president of the FAI, he contested for the vice president position which he lost to Paul Cooke. Heraghty held the position of Gerry in the FAI board same day of the elections after being in the board for many years.
