= Paula Gorham =

Irish footballer

Personal information
- Position: Forward

Senior career*
Years	Team	Apps	(Gls)
- Dundalk

International career
1973-1978	Republic of Ireland	11	(3)
- * Club domestic league appearances and goals

Paula Gorham is a former Irish football player who played for Dundalk F.C. and the Ireland women's national team. She played in the Republic of Ireland's official international debut, scoring a hat-trick against Wales.

== Career ==
Gorham, one of eleven siblings, began playing competitively at age 11 at the Dundalk Maytime Festival. She played on a women's side representing the local shoe factory. She could play with either her left or her right foot.

Gorham played for Dundalk Ladies. Dundalk, a new team, hadn't lost a game in two years in Ireland's unofficial women's national league when they travelled to Wales in 1970. Dundalk was to play Corinthians Nomads in what The Guardian called "effectively an Ireland v England women's match." Gorham was sixteen at the time. The game was played at Prestatyn Raceway as women's football was banned from association-affiliated football grounds. Corinthians won 7–1 in front of a crowd of 4,000 with Gorham scoring the sole goal for Dundalk. Thanks to her performance, Gorham also was given an award at the North London Sports Awards and was the only woman featured.

Gorham was offered a professional contract from Stade de Reims as a teenager but turned it down.

On 13 May, 1973, the Republic of Ireland made their official international debut with Gorham scoring a hat-trick, securing a 3–2 win in an away friendly game against Wales. Gorham went on to represent the Republic of Ireland eleven times, including the day after her honeymoon and several months pregnant. Gorham only received an official international cap from the FAI in 2016.

In 2021, Gorham was inducted into the FAI Hall of Fame for her "unique contribution to Irish football."
