= Megan Smyth-Lynch =

Irish footballer and coach

Personal information
- Date of birth: 18 September 1997 (age 29)
- Place of birth: Dublin, Ireland
- Position: Attacking midfielder

Team information
- Current team: Wexford
- Number: 16

Youth career
- Swords Celtic
- Swords Manor
- Shelbourne

Senior career*
Years	Team	Apps	(Gls)
2013–2014	Shamrock Rovers		
2014–2015	Raheny United		
2015	Shelbourne		
2016–2021	Peamount United		
2022–2024	Shelbourne		
2024–2025	Como 1907		
2025	Shelbourne		
2026–	Wexford		

International career
- Republic of Ireland U16
- Republic of Ireland U17
- Republic of Ireland U19

Managerial career
- 2023–: Republic of Ireland U16 (assistant)
- 2023: Republic of Ireland U16 (interim)
- * Club domestic league appearances and goals

Megan Smyth-Lynch (born 18 September 1997) is an Irish footballer and coach who plays as an attacking midfielder for League of Ireland Women's Premier Division club Wexford. She has won multiple League of Ireland titles and FAI Women's Cups with Raheny United, Peamount United, and Shelbourne, competed in the UEFA Women's Champions League, and represented the Republic of Ireland at youth international levels.

== Early career ==
Smyth-Lynch grew up in Swords, playing youth football with local clubs Swords Celtic and Swords Manor before joining Shelbourne's youth setup.

== Club career ==
Smyth-Lynch began her senior career with Shamrock Rovers during the 2013–14 season before transferring to Raheny United for the 2014–15 campaign, where she won the 2014 FAI Women's Cup and 2015 WNL Cup. Following Raheny's merger into Shelbourne in 2015, she briefly represented the club before signing with Peamount United in 2016. During seven seasons with Peamount, Smyth-Lynch scored the late winning goal in the 2018 WNL League Cup final against Wexford Youths, and helped the club secure back-to-back league championships in 2019 and 2020. In 2019, she was nominated for Player of the Year and named in the Women's National League Team of the Year.

In January 2022, Smyth-Lynch returned to Shelbourne, where she scored in the 4–0 final-day victory over Wexford Youths that clinched the 2022 Women's National League title and completed a domestic League and Cup "double". She was named League of Ireland Women's Premier Division Player of the Month for March 2023 after scoring four goals in the opening five matches of the season. In August 2024, she scored the winning goal against Shamrock Rovers to send Shelbourne into the FAI Women's Cup semi-finals, going on to win another FAI Cup medal in the 6–1 final victory over Athlone Town.

In December 2024, Smyth-Lynch moved abroad to sign with Italian club Como 1907 on a contract running through June 2025. She returned to Shelbourne in July 2025 for the remainder of the domestic season before signing with Wexford ahead of the 2026 campaign.

== International career ==
=== Youth ===
Smyth-Lynch represented Ireland at schoolgirl level while she attended St. Finian's Community College, Swords. In August 2013, she opened the scoring for the Republic of Ireland women's national under-17 football team in their 12–1 2014 UEFA Women's Under-17 Championship qualification win over Bosnia and Herzegovina in Ulyanovsk, Russia.

Smyth-Lynch (then playing as Megan Lynch) made her debut for the Republic of Ireland under-19 team on 26 August 2015, coming on as a 53rd-minute substitute in a 2–1 friendly victory over Northern Ireland at the AUL Complex. She made her first start and scored her first goal at under-19 level in another friendly win over Northern Ireland on 25 February 2016, and went on to make five further appearances in 2016, including in the 2016 UEFA Women's Under-19 Championship elite round qualifiers.

While enrolled at South East Technological University (SETU), Smyth-Lynch represented Ireland at the 2019 Summer Universiade, as Ireland reached the semi-final.

== Coaching career ==
A graduate in Sports Management and Coaching from SETU and a UEFA A Licence candidate, Smyth-Lynch works full-time in grassroots football development for the Football Association of Ireland (FAI). Having served as assistant coach for the Republic of Ireland women's under-16 team, she was appointed interim head coach in February 2023 while head coach Tom Elmes joined the senior women's national team coaching staff ahead of the 2023 FIFA Women's World Cup.

== Honours ==
Raheny United

- FAI Women's Cup: 2014
- WNL Cup: 2015

Peamount United

- League of Ireland Women's Premier Division: 2019, 2020
- FAI Women's Cup: 2020
- WNL Cup: 2018

Shelbourne

- League of Ireland Women's Premier Division: 2022
- FAI Women's Cup: 2022, 2024

Individual

- League of Ireland Women's Premier Division Player of the Month: March 2023
