= Madie Gibson =

American association footballer (born 1997)

Personal information
- Full name: Madison Anne Gibson
- Date of birth: March 17, 1997 (age 29)
- Place of birth: Cape May, New Jersey, United States
- Height: 1.76 m (5 ft 9 in)
- Positions: Forward; winger

Team information
- Current team: Athlone Town
- Number: 17

Youth career
- Lower Cape May Regional High School

College career
| Years | Team | Apps | (Gls) |
| 2016–2019 | Monmouth Hawks | 82 | (35) |

Senior career*
| Years | Team | Apps | (Gls) |
| 2021–2022 | FC Gintra | 23 | (11) |
| 2022– | Athlone Town | | |
- * Club domestic league appearances and goals as of 18:19, 25 October 2026 (UTC)

Madison Anne Gibson (born March 17, 1997) is an American association footballer who plays as a forward or winger for League of Ireland club Athlone Town. Renowned for her direct attacking style and left-footed dead-ball delivery—including scoring multiple goals directly from corner kicks—she is a multi-time league and cup winner in Irish domestic football.

Raised in Cape May, New Jersey, Gibson played collegiately for the Monmouth Hawks, earning conference offensive player of the year honours before starting her professional career abroad with Lithuanian champions FC Gintra. She moved to Ireland in July 2022 via Athlone Town's strategic partnership with Valeo FC and at the recommendation of her friend Dana Scheriff.

== Early life and college career ==
Gibson grew up in the Erma section of Lower Township, New Jersey in a devoted soccer family—described in local media as having a "soccer mom in the truest sense of the word"—where her mother, Anne, played semi-professionally and coached her three daughters. Gibson joked that for her mother, the household was a "project Messi" from the moment the children could walk. Part of the generation that grew up inspired by the United States women's national soccer team's (USWNT) dynasty from the 1999 FIFA Women's World Cup onward, she cited Mia Hamm as her primary childhood idol.

A three-sport participant at Lower Cape May Regional High School (graduating in 2015), she set a program record with 126 career soccer goals (including 41 as a senior) and was named the Atlantic City Press Player of the Year in 2014, alongside featuring as an accomplished basketball player with 1,090 career points and a prolific lacrosse scorer with 124 goals.

She played four seasons of collegiate soccer for the Monmouth Hawks at Monmouth University from 2016 to 2019 (she redshirted in 2015 after arriving with an anterior cruciate ligament injury), starting all 82 of her appearances. After breaking into the Monmouth side at left-back, head coach Dr Krissy Turner soon shifted Gibson into an attacking role upon recognising her 1-v-1 dribbling talent and wide crossing range. The adjustment paid off when she earned United Soccer Coaches First Team All-Region honours as a junior in 2018 as the only selection not from the traditionally-dominant Atlantic Coast Conference (ACC). She finished her collegiate career tied for fifth in program history with 35 goals and second with 32 assists (102 points), earning 2016 Metro Atlantic Athletic Conference (MAAC) Rookie of the Year, 2018 MAAC Offensive Player of the Year, and 2019 MAC Hermann Trophy Watch List recognition.

== Club career ==
=== FC Gintra ===
Seeking UEFA Women's Champions League experience, Gibson moved abroad to sign with Lithuanian Moterų A Lyga champions FC Gintra (then playing as Gintra–Universitetas) in May 2020. She made an immediate impact with seven goals across her first four appearances—including a hat-trick in a 14–0 victory over Utenos Utenis—before suffering a ruptured left anterior cruciate ligament (ACL) in mid-July 2020 that prematurely ended her debut season. During her rehabilitation under strict COVID-19 lockdowns, teammates honoured her and injured colleague Lolita Žižytė by warming up in #17 and #19 shirts bearing the motto "Better than before".

Having extended her contract in August 2020, Gibson returned to Šiauliai for the 2021 campaign. She scored in her comeback appearance during a 9–0 rout of MFA Žalgiris-MRU in April 2021, and later converted a crucial penalty-rebound goal in a 2–0 UEFA Women's Champions League qualifying semi-final victory over Flora Tallinn in August 2021. Across her two partial seasons in Lithuania, official Lithuanian Football Federation records log 23 Moterų A Lyga appearances and 11 goals.

=== Athlone Town ===
In July 2022, following encouragement from her former Monmouth teammate Dana Scheriff, Gibson signed with League of Ireland club Athlone Town. She made her debut on July 10, 2022, and scored seven goals during her initial half-season, including a hat-trick against Wexford Youths in the FAI Women's Cup semi-final to help Athlone reach their first-ever national cup final. Although Athlone lost the final 2–0 to Shelbourne, Gibson expressed excitement at facing her childhood idol and USWNT veteran Heather O'Reilly—who came out of retirement to play for Shelbourne—noting that friends back in the United States messaged her in disbelief.

The team broke through by capturing the inaugural Women's President's Cup in February 2023—securing the senior women's side's first piece of silverware—before the 2023 FAI Women's Cup triumph cemented a core "Monmouth quartet" of former collegiate teammates (Gibson, Dana Scheriff, Jesi Rossman, and Lauren Karabin) who embedded full-time in the Midlands. Gibson became a central figure in Athlone's domestic dominance, winning the 2024 Women's Premier Division title, and a league-and-cup double in 2025 (scoring 11 goals, including five direct from corner kicks). She was a shortlisted nominee for the Player of the Year award in both 2024 (won by Julie-Ann Russell) and 2025 (won by club-mate Kelly Brady).

In 2026 she surpassed 100 appearances for the club, captured the September 2026 Women's Premier Division Player of the Month award, and helped Athlone secure a third consecutive league title. Following the May 2026 appointment of former Republic of Ireland international Lily Agg as head coach, Gibson credited Agg with elevating the squad's tactical maturity, noting: "She's already taught us so much and helped us more on the tactical side of things. We didn't even think about that before, we just worked hard and ran everywhere." Ahead of their fourth consecutive FAI Cup final meeting against rivals Shelbourne in September 2026—having just sealed a third straight league title—Gibson was relaxed about the fixture's unusual early-season scheduling: "If it was on Christmas Day? I'd show up". Shelbourne won 3–1 in that decider to deny Athlone another double.

== Style of play ==
Operating primarily as a left-footed left winger or central striker, Gibson is defined by direct attacking urgency, high off-ball work rate, and specialized dead-ball delivery—notably scoring five goals directly from corner kicks during the 2025 campaign, including two in a 3–0 European tie against ŽNK Agram. When deployed wide on the left, she functions as an inverted winger who isolates full-backs before cutting inside to shoot or combine, contrasting with her role as a physical central reference point holding up play against central defenders. Despite her prolific scoring, Gibson noted that finding the net is "never my first thought" upon receiving the ball out wide; she prioritizes creator responsibilities—such as picking out front-post runs and delivering inswingers.

League of Ireland statistical breakdowns highlighted her as the competition's premier individual creator, leading the Women's Premier Division in key passes (3.3 per 90), crosses attempted (5.12 per 90 with 45% accuracy), and successful dribbles (9.4 per 90), while anchoring offensive duels ahead of rival forwards. Former Athlone head coach Ciarán Kilduff singled out her consistent scoring threat and intense application in training as fundamental to transforming the club into domestic contenders. In October 2025 the Irish Independent's chief sportswriter David Kelly adjudged that Gibson "marries astonishing endeavour with supreme grace".

Following her September 2026 Player of the Month display, Athlone manager and former Republic of Ireland international Lily Agg praised her technical quality, tactical intelligence, and ability to shift seamlessly between wide isolation and central link-up play. Match reports have noted that she "tormented opposition defences" with her delivery from the left flank, while Sligo Rovers manager Steve Feeney and opposing tactical setups regularly designated specialized markers to contain her transition threat. Comparing her developmental trajectory across leagues, Gibson noted that her time with FC Gintra in Lithuania refined her technical composure in tight spaces, whereas the League of Ireland demanded an athletic, high-intensity verticality reminiscent of her college career at Monmouth University.

As a wide attacking player, Gibson is less comfortable with defensive duties. She confessed that she "hates coming back defensively" and candidly assessed her brief sophomore left-back stint at Monmouth with the verdict that she "wasn't very good at it".

== International eligibility ==
Although born and raised in the United States, Gibson explored potential FIFA eligibility avenues through ancestral ties to represent the Republic of Ireland internationally during her rise in the League of Ireland. Despite anticipating some Irish heritage, genealogical research traced her family line back to 1800s Texas rather than Ireland.

== Personal life ==
Gibson is in a relationship with American professional footballer Patrick Hickey, who plays as a defender in the League of Ireland. The pair arrived in Athlone during the same week in July 2022 as part of the American player influx facilitated by Athlone Town's partnership with Valeo FC, initially bonding as part of the overseas cohort living locally before starting a relationship. They share a friendly domestic rivalry; in autumn 2024, Hickey won the Men's Player of the Month award for August with Galway United before Gibson claimed the Women's Player of the Month award for September.

Alongside her playing career, Gibson pursued a Digital Marketing master's degree at the Technological University of the Shannon and worked 15 hours a week in commercial sales and kit sponsorships for Athlone Town, supplementing her income with weekend hospitality shifts. Her routine reflected the semi-professional reality of the Women's Premier Division, where evening training schedules required local teammates to balance football with full-time professions like school teaching, while the club's relative women's dominance achieved a rare internal pay parity with the men's side. Following their 2024 title win, Gibson and teammate Kelly Brady celebrated by bringing the championship trophy to a local chipper where they regularly ate after matches, crediting the staff's food for fuelling their success.

== Honours ==
Monmouth Hawks

- Metro Atlantic Athletic Conference Regular Season: 2016, 2017, 2018, 2019
- MAAC Women's Soccer Tournament: 2016, 2017, 2018, 2019

Athlone Town

- Women's Premier Division: 2024, 2025, 2026
- FAI Women's Cup: 2023, 2025

Individual

- MAAC Offensive Player of the Year: 2018
- MAAC Championship Most Outstanding Player: 2018
- MAAC Rookie of the Year: 2016
- PFAI Women's Premier Division Team of the Year (3): 2023, 2024, 2025
