= Jazlyn Moya =

Dominican footballer (born 1997)

Personal information
- Full name: Jazlyn Asia Santos Moya
- Birth name: Jazlyn Asia Moya-Santos
- Date of birth: 24 January 1997 (age 29)
- Place of birth: New Brunswick, New Jersey, United States
- Height: 1.57 m (5 ft 2 in)
- Position: Forward

Team information
- Current team: Logan Lightning

Youth career
- Colonia Patriots

College career
Years	Team	Apps	(Gls)
2015–2018	Monmouth Hawks	59	(7)

Senior career*
Years	Team	Apps	(Gls)
2021	New Jersey Copa FC	4	(0)
2022–	Logan Lightning	0	(0)

International career^{‡}
2021–	Dominican Republic	1	(0)
- * Club domestic league appearances and goals as of 2021. ‡ National team caps and goals as of 7 July 2021.

Jazlyn Asia Santos Moya (born 24 January 1997), known as Jazlyn Moya, is a footballer who plays as a forward for Australian club Logan Lightning FC. Born in the United States, she plays for the Dominican Republic national team.

== Early life ==
Moya was born in New Brunswick, New Jersey to a Dominican father and a Peruvian mother. She was raised in Avenel, New Jersey.

== High school and college career ==
Moya has attended the Colonia High School in Colonia, New Jersey and the Monmouth University in West Long Branch, New Jersey.

== Club career ==
Moya has played for New Jersey Copa FC in the United Women's Soccer.

== International career ==
Moya attended a training camp of the senior Peru women's national team in March 2019. She made her senior debut for the Dominican Republic on 7 July 2021.
