= Jessica Gargan =

Irish footballer

Jess Gargan
Personal information
- Full name: Jessica Gargan
- Date of birth: 10 March 1997 (age 29)
- Place of birth: Dublin, Ireland
- Height: 5 ft 9 in (1.75 m)
- Positions: Defender; midfielder

Team information
- Current team: Shamrock Rovers
- Number: 2

Youth career
- Swords Rovers
- 2010–2013: Shelbourne

College career
| Years | Team | Apps | (Gls) |
| 2015–2018 | Quinnipiac Bobcats | 70 | (7) |

Senior career*
| Years | Team | Apps | (Gls) |
| 2013–2015 | Peamount United | | |
| 2019–2022 | Shelbourne | | |
| 2023– | Shamrock Rovers | | |

International career^{‡}
| 2019 | Republic of Ireland | 2 | (0) |
- * Club domestic league appearances and goals as of 21:36, 23 December 2022 (UTC) ‡ National team caps and goals as of 21:36, 23 December 2022 (UTC)

Jessica Gargan (born 10 March 1997) is an Irish association footballer who plays as a defender for Women's National League club Shamrock Rovers. Since making her debut in August 2019 she has been a member of the Republic of Ireland women's national team. Gargan is predominantly a right-back but can also play further forward as a winger. She spent four years playing college soccer in the United States with Quinnipiac Bobcats and has also represented Peamount United and Shelbourne.

== Club career ==
Gargan was born and raised in Dublin and played youth football for Swords Rovers. She then spent three years in the youth system of Shelbourne FC. Gargan signed for Peamount United in 2013 and made her first Women's National League (WNL) appearances for the club in 2014–15.

In 2015 she accepted an offer to play four years of college soccer for the Quinnipiac University "Bobcats". In her freshman season, Gargan appeared in all 17 matches (16 starts) and scored four goals. She was named to the Metro Atlantic Athletic Conference (MAAC) All-Rookie Team. As a sophomore in 2016, she was named to the MAAC All-Tournament Team. In 2018 she completed her college career with a total of seven goals in 70 appearances.

Ahead of the 2019 WNL season, Gargan accepted an offer to re-join Shelbourne FC who now competed at WNL level.

At the end of a consistent 2022 Women's National League campaign, in which she helped secure a League and Cup double for Shelbourne, Gargan was among five players to leave the club for wealthy rivals Shamrock Rovers. She reacted angrily to a controversial and swiftly-deleted tweet on the Shelbourne club account, which referenced The Red Flag lyrics 'Though cowards flinch and traitors sneer' and was perceived as being aimed at the departing players.

== International career ==
=== Youth ===
Gargan represented Ireland at schoolgirl level while she attended St. Finian's Community College, Swords. In August 2013, she scored four times for the Republic of Ireland women's national under-17 football team in their 12–1 2014 UEFA Women's Under-17 Championship qualification win over Bosnia and Herzegovina in Ulyanovsk, Russia. She scored again in a 4–0 win over hosts Romania in the elite round at Mogoșoaia on 5 October 2013, but Ireland finished second behind Spain and were eliminated.

Gargan was part of the Republic of Ireland women's national under-19 football team which qualified for the UEFA Women's Under-19 Championship finals for the first time in 2014. Seen as an athletic midfielder, she secured her place in the squad with a goal against Sweden in a pre-tournament fixture at La Manga at La Manga Club Football Stadium. Ireland lost 4–0 to the Netherlands in the semi-final, for whom Vivianne Miedema scored a hat-trick.

Just after completing her studies at Quinnipiac University, Gargan represented Ireland at the 2019 Summer Universiade.

=== Senior ===
In August 2019 she won her first senior cap, starting a 3–0 friendly defeat by the United States at the Rose Bowl in Pasadena, California. She was complimented on her performance by Ireland's interim manager Tom O'Connor: "Niamh Farrelly and Jess Gargan were excellent, they didn't look out of sync at all". A competitive debut followed in the opening UEFA Women's Euro 2022 qualifier against Montenegro, a 2–0 win at Tallaght Stadium on 3 September 2019.
