= Keeva Keenan =

Irish association footballer

Personal information
- Full name: Keeva Keenan
- Date of birth: 16 August 1997 (age 29)
- Place of birth: Dublin, Ireland
- Position: Defender

Team information
- Current team: Shelbourne
- Number: 2

Youth career
- WFTA
- Shelbourne

Senior career*
Years	Team	Apps	(Gls)
2014–2015	Raheny United		
2015–2016	Shelbourne		
2016–2018	Glasgow City		
2018–2021	Celtic		
2021–	Shelbourne	83	(6)

International career^{‡}
2012–2013	Republic of Ireland U17		
2014–2016	Republic of Ireland U19		
2019–	Republic of Ireland	3	(0)
- * Club domestic league appearances and goals as of 10 May 2026 ‡ National team caps and goals as of 10 May 2026

Keeva Keenan (born 16 August 1997) is an Irish international footballer who plays for Shelbourne of the Women's National League (WNL). She previously played for Scottish Women's Premier League (SWPL) clubs Celtic and Glasgow City, and for WNL clubs Raheny United and Shelbourne. She made her debut for the Republic of Ireland women's national football team in October 2019.

== Club career ==
In January 2018, Keenan left Glasgow City for their local rivals Celtic. She was named club Player of the Year in her first season with the club. In 2020–21 she helped Celtic secure qualification to the UEFA Women's Champions League for the first time, but left the club at the end of the season. She agreed a return to Shelbourne in July 2021.

== International career ==
On 5 May 2014, Republic of Ireland women's national football team manager Susan Ronan named Keenan in an experimental squad for a friendly against the Basque Country. Keenan did not feature in Ireland's 2–0 defeat in Azpeitia, which was not classified as a full international fixture.

Early in his reign as Ireland's national team coach, Colin Bell called-up Keenan for a friendly with Slovakia at Tallaght Stadium in April 2017. She remained an unused substitute in Ireland's 1–0 win and was subsequently "frozen out" by Bell.

In September 2019, Keenan was "in disbelief" to be called into the first senior squad to be named by Bell's successor Vera Pauw. She started Ireland's 3–2 win over Ukraine at Tallaght Stadium.
