= Rachel Graham =

Irish footballer

Personal information
- Date of birth: 18 July 1989 (age 37)
- Place of birth: Dublin, Ireland
- Positions: Defender; midfielder

Team information
- Current team: Shelbourne
- Number: 8

Youth career
- Trinity Sports

Senior career*
Years	Team	Apps	(Gls)
2003–2015	Raheny United		
2015–	Shelbourne		

International career^{‡}
2008	Republic of Ireland U19	1	(0)
2013–	Republic of Ireland	4	(0)
- * Club domestic league appearances and goals ‡ National team caps and goals as of 22 September 2013

Rachel Graham (born 18 July 1989) is an Irish footballer and football coach who plays for Women's National League club Shelbourne. She won her first cap for the Republic of Ireland women's national team in March 2013. An industrious defensive midfielder who can also play as a defender, she joined Shelbourne in their previous guise as Raheny United.

== Club career ==
Graham was born in Dublin and grew up in Donaghmede. She began playing street football as the only girl alongside the neighbourhood boys and joined a boy's club called Trinity Sports. After a couple of seasons she moved to Raheny United at 14 years old.

In 2007 Graham played as Raheny reached the FAI Women's Cup final, but were beaten 1–0 by a Galway League select team at Dalymount Park. Graham was still playing for Raheny United when the Women's National League (WNL) was formed in 2011 and represented the club in the competition's first season.

Over the next three seasons, Graham won two league titles and three consecutive FAI Women's Cups with "The Pandas." She also represented the club in the UEFA Women's Champions League, including in 2014–15 when they became the first Irish club to win all three matches in the group stage. For the 2015–16 season, Graham remained with the club in their new guise as Shelbourne.

Throughout much of her career Graham has functioned as a defensive midfielder, although she has also been deployed as a right-back and as a central defender or sweeper.

== International career ==
In March 2013 Republic of Ireland women's national team coach Susan Ronan called up Graham for the 2013 Cyprus Cup, as a replacement for Julie-Ann Russell who had a quad injury. Graham won her first senior cap in a 0–0 draw with South Korea, staged in Paralimni on 11 March 2013.

In June 2013 Graham started but was substituted at half-time as Ireland recovered from 2–0 down to draw 2–2 in a friendly with Austria at Tallaght Stadium in Dublin. She continued to be named in national team squads during Ireland's unsuccessful 2015 FIFA Women's World Cup qualification campaign. In January 2015 she featured in a 3–1 training match defeat by Norway at La Manga Stadium. After the match she was diagnosed with a stress fracture in her foot, which ruled her out of the 2015 Istria Cup.

While enrolled at Institute of Technology, Carlow, Graham represented Ireland at the 2015 edition of the Summer Universiade in Gwangju. She was recalled to the national team squad for the 2016 Cyprus Cup, where she started a 1–0 defeat by Hungary and appeared as an 89th-minute substitute in a 2–0 win over Finland.

When Susan Ronan stood down and was replaced by Colin Bell in February 2017, Graham acknowledged that she was not yet a regular pick at national team level. She was relaxed about the prospect of winning further call-ups under Bell, saying: "if it happens, it happens".

== Coaching career ==
While playing for Shelbourne, Graham began coaching the club's under 16 team and undertaking coaching qualifications. Several graduates of Graham's under 16s team went on to join her in the club first team and some emulated her by playing for Ireland at senior level.
