= Alex Kavanagh =

Irish footballer (born 1999)

Personal information
- Full name: Alexandra Kavanagh
- Date of birth: 11 December 1999 (age 26)
- Place of birth: Finglas, Dublin
- Position: Midfielder

Team information
- Current team: Shelbourne
- Number: 6

Youth career
- Home Farm
- 2011–2015: Shelbourne

Senior career*
Years	Team	Apps	(Gls)
2016–	Shelbourne		

International career^{‡}
2016–2018	Republic of Ireland U19	17	(3)
2016–	Republic of Ireland	1	(0)
- * Club domestic league appearances and goals as of 01:17, 6 December 2020 (UTC) ‡ National team caps and goals as of 01:17, 6 December 2020 (UTC)

Alexandra Kavanagh (born 11 December 1999) is an Irish association footballer who plays for Women's National League (WNL) club Shelbourne and the Republic of Ireland women's national team. She is a central midfielder with good technique, who is also a capable goal scorer.

== Club career ==
Kavanagh is from Finglas, Dublin and began playing soccer for Shelbourne's girls' teams in 2011 when she was 11 years old. She also played up to under-14 level with Home Farm, as the only girl in the team.

In January 2016 Kavanagh was elevated into Shelbourne's Women's National League squad, scoring on her debut on 20 February 2016; a 12–1 win over a Castlebar Celtic team in rapid decline. (Note: Castlebar Celtic later withdrew from the WNL and their 2015–16 results were expunged from the records.) In the remainder of the 2015–16 season Kavanagh featured as Shelbourne were edged out by Wexford Youths in both the WNL Shield final and a play-off for the League title.

In the 2016 season, Kavanagh started the 5–0 FAI Women's Cup final win over Wexford Youths as Shelbourne secured a League and Cup "double". She displayed good form in the 2019 Women's National League, being named WNL Player of the Month for March 2019, and named in the WNL Team of the Season.

In the delayed and truncated 2020 Women's National League season Kavanagh missed some time out through injury. When she scored the WNL's first ever televised goal, in Shelbourne's 1–0 win over DLR Waves at Tolka Park on 2 October 2021, it was her first 90-minute appearance for a year.

After further injuries disrupted her progress, Kavanagh recaptured her best form in the later stages of the 2022 campaign, winning WNL Player of the Month for October 2022. In the 2022 FAI Women's Cup Final, she served an assist for the first goal as Shelbourne beat Athlone Town 2–0 to secure a League and Cup "double".

== International career ==
=== Youth ===
In November 2012 Kavanagh became the youngest ever person to play football for Ireland, when she played for the under-15 schoolgirl team in two matches at St George's Park National Football Centre in Burton upon Trent, England. At 12 years old she broke the record previously held by Conor Clifford. She continued to play for Ireland's under-15s during 2013–14, while attending St. Michael's Secondary School in Finglas.

With the Republic of Ireland women's national under-17 football team, Kavanagh competed at the 2016 UEFA Women's Under-17 Championship qualification mini tournament in Turkey, then the elite round in France. She was promoted to the Republic of Ireland women's national under-19 football team for a match against Belgium in September 2016, and scored a penalty kick in Ireland's 2–1 defeat.

With the under-19s Kavanagh competed in the 2017 UEFA Women's Under-19 Championship qualification series in North Macedonia and in the elite round at Markets Field, Limerick. By the time of the following year's elite round at Turners Cross, Cork, Kavanagh remained part of the team. She concluded her under-19 national team career with three goals in 17 appearances.

=== Senior ===
In August 2016 Ireland coach Susan Ronan named Kavanagh in a young and predominantly home-based senior squad for a training camp in Wales. She won her first senior cap in the second of two scheduled friendly matches against the Welsh hosts, as an 83rd-minute substitute for Jetta Berrill in Ireland's 2–1 win.

Kavanagh made another substitute appearance in a 2–1 home friendly win over the Basque Country on 25 November 2016, coming in for Áine O'Gorman after 85 minutes. She continued to be selected by Ronan's successor Colin Bell, being called up for two friendlies against Iceland and Scotland ahead of the 2019 FIFA Women's World Cup qualifying series. In August 2019 Kavanagh was an unused substitute in a 3–0 friendly defeat by the United States at the Rose Bowl in Pasadena, California.

In April of 2025 Kavanagh received her first Ireland call up in years for a game against Greece in Tallaght Stadium after captain Katie McCabe was suspended after picking up two yellow cards in the games prior.

== Personal life ==
Kavanagh's older brother Cian is also a soccer player. An attacking midfielder like his sister, Cian Kavanagh developed at St. Kevin's Boys and has played in the League of Ireland for Shamrock Rovers, Shelbourne, UCD, Drogheda United and Wexford.

Alex and Cian's father George Kavanagh played League of Ireland football for St. Pats, Bray Wanderers and Thurles Town.
