= Pearl Slattery =

Irish footballer (born 1989)

Personal information
- Date of birth: 11 April 1989 (age 37)
- Place of birth: Dublin, Ireland
- Height: 5 ft 5 in (1.65 m)
- Position: Defender

Team information
- Current team: Shelbourne
- Number: 4

Youth career
- Fatima Boys
- Templeogue United

College career
Years	Team	Apps	(Gls)
2010–2011	Hutchinson Blue Dragons	42	(29)
2012	Clayton State Lakers	15	(2)

Senior career*
Years	Team	Apps	(Gls)
2008–2010	St Catherine's		
2010–2015	Raheny United		
2015–	Shelbourne		
- * Club domestic league appearances and goals as of 20:51, 12 November 2022 (UTC) ‡ National team caps and goals as of 20:51, 12 November 2022 (UTC)

Pearl Slattery (born 11 April 1989) is an Irish football coach and player who is a defender for Women's National League club Shelbourne.

== Club career ==
Slattery is from Dublin and grew up in Rialto. She played football with Fatima Boys, Templeogue United, St Catherine's and Raheny United before moving to play college soccer with Hutchinson Blue Dragons in 2010. After 29 goals in 42 appearances, Slattery left Hutchinson for the Clayton State Lakers in 2012, where she scored twice in 15 appearances.

In 2013 Slattery returned to Raheny United to play in the Women's National League. She remained with the club in their new guise as Shelbourne for the 2015–16 season, while also training as a coach and working for the Football Association of Ireland. When club captain Slattery re-signed for Shelbourne ahead of the 2022 season, she was one of the Women's National League's all-time most decorated players.

== Personal life ==
In 2020 Slattery was in a relationship with Siobhán Killeen. Slattery's mother Patricia McCann is a playwright.
