= 2023 Women's Premiership (Northern Ireland) =

Football league season

Women's Premiership (Northern Ireland)
- Season: 2023
- Champions: Glentoran
- Relegated: Ballymena United
- Matches: 90
- Goals: 458 (5.09 per match)
- Biggest home win: Cliftonville 15–0 Ballymena United
- Biggest away win: Mid-Ulster 0–14 Cliftonville
- Highest scoring: Cliftonville 15–0 Ballymena United
- Longest unbeaten run: 18 matches Glentoran

The 2023 Northern Irish Women's Premiership, currently branded as Sports Direct Women's Premiership for sponsorship reasons, is the 20th season of the top-tier women's football league in Northern Ireland.

Cliftonville were the defending champions. The 2023 season saw an increase in the number of teams in the league to ten, with the addition of Ballymena United and Larne.

== Teams and locations ==
The following teams make up the 2023 season.

Location of teams in the 2023 season

Teams are listed in alphabetical order.

Team	Location	Stadium	Capacity
Ballymena United	Ballymena	Ballymena Showgrounds	3,600
Cliftonville	Belfast (Oldpark)	Solitude	2,530
Crusaders Strikers	Belfast (Shore Road)	Seaview	3,383
Derry City	Derry	Brandywell Stadium	3,700
Glentoran	Belfast (Sydenham)	The Oval	26,556
Larne	Larne	Inver Park	3,250
Linfield	Belfast (Boucher Road)	New Midgley Park	n/a
Lisburn Ladies	Lisburn	Bluebell Stadium	1,280
Mid-Ulster Ladies	Cookstown	Mid-Ulster Sports Arena	n/a
Sion Swifts	Strabane	Melvin Sports Complex	n/a

== League table ==
Pos	Team	Pld	W	D	L	GF	GA	GD	Pts	Qualification or relegation
1	Glentoran (C)	18	16	2	0	101	7	+94	50	Qualification for the Champions League first round
2	Cliftonville	18	14	2	2	104	10	+94	44	
3	Crusaders Strikers	18	13	0	5	42	21	+21	39	
4	Sion Swifts	18	12	1	5	58	24	+34	37	
5	Linfield	18	10	2	6	58	24	+34	32	
6	Lisburn Ladies	18	7	1	10	28	50	−22	22	
7	Larne	18	5	1	12	21	84	−63	16	
8	Derry City	18	3	0	15	22	80	−58	9	
9	Mid-Ulster Ladies	18	1	4	13	13	74	−61	7	
10	Ballymena United (R)	18	1	3	14	11	84	−73	6	Relegation to NIWFA Championship

Updated to match(es) played on 13 October 2023. Source:

== Results ==
Home \ Away	BAL	CLI	CRS	DER	GLE	LAR	LIN	LIS	MID	SIO
Ballymena United	—	0–6	1–6	2–4	0–9	2–2	0–2	1–3	2–2	0–6
Cliftonville	15–0	—	1–2	8–1	2–2	10–0	3–0	2–0	7–0	4–0
Crusaders	3–0	3–1	—	5–0	0–3	4–0	2–0	0–1	3–0	1–0
Derry City	2–3	0–9	0–2	—	0–6	2–3	1–8	2–5	4–1	0–4
Glentoran	11–0	1–1	5–0	11–0	—	10–0	2–0	8–1	5–0	4–1
Larne	1–0	0–12	0–1	1–2	0–7	—	0–4	2–5	4–1	1–5
Linfield	5–0	0–2	5–2	3–1	2–3	8–0	—	5–0	7–0	1–1
Lisburn Ladies	3–0	0–3	1–3	3–1	0–5	2–3	0–5	—	1–1	0–6
Mid-Ulster Ladies	0–0	0–14	0–5	2–0	0–6	2–4	2–2	0–2	—	0–3
Sion Swifts	4–0	1–4	3–0	4–2	0–3	7–0	5–1	3–1	5–2	—

Updated to match(es) played on 13 October 2023. Source:
Legend: Blue = home team win; Yellow = draw; Red = away team win.
