= 2024 Women's Premiership (Northern Ireland) =

Football league season

Women's Premiership (Northern Ireland)
- Season: 2024
- Dates: 5 May 2024 – 11 October 2024
- Champions: Cliftonville
- Relegated: Mid-Ulster Ladies
- Champions League: Cliftonville
- Matches: 54
- Goals: 271 (5.02 per match)
- All statistics correct as of 16 September 2024.

The 2024 Northern Irish Women's Premiership, currently branded as Sports Direct Women's Premiership for sponsorship reasons, is the 21st season of the top-tier women's football league in Northern Ireland. Glentoran are the defending champions. The 2024 season will see a decrease in the number of teams in the league to nine, with the loss of Sion Swifts.

== Teams and locations ==
The following teams make up the 2024 season.

Location of teams in the 2024 season

Teams are listed in alphabetical order.

Team	Location	Stadium	Capacity
Cliftonville	Belfast (Oldpark)	Solitude	2,530
Crusaders Strikers	Belfast (Shore Road)	Seaview	3,383
Derry City	Derry	Brandywell Stadium	3,700
Glentoran	Belfast (Sydenham)	Blanchflower Stadium	1,100
Larne	Larne	Inver Park	3,250
Linfield	Belfast (Boucher Road)	New Midgley Park	n/a
Lisburn Ladies	Lisburn	Bluebell Stadium	1,280
Lisburn Rangers	Glenavy	Crewe Park	n/a
Mid-Ulster Ladies	Dungannon	Stangmore Park	2,000

== League table ==
Pos	Team	Pld	W	D	L	GF	GA	GD	Pts	Qualification or relegation
1	Cliftonville (C)	16	16	0	0	76	8	+68	48	Qualification for the Champions League first round
2	Glentoran	16	13	1	2	80	15	+65	40	
3	Linfield	16	10	2	4	68	23	+45	32	
4	Lisburn Rangers	16	9	1	6	41	34	+7	28	
5	Crusaders Strikers	16	5	3	8	24	30	−6	18	
6	Derry City	16	5	3	8	25	42	−17	18	
7	Lisburn Ladies	16	4	2	10	18	50	−32	14	
8	Larne	16	2	3	11	17	63	−46	9	
9	Mid-Ulster Ladies (R)	16	0	1	15	7	91	−84	1	Relegation to NIWFA Championship

Source: NIFootballLeague.com

== Results ==
Home \ Away	CLI	CRS	DER	GLE	LAR	LIN	LIS	LIR	MID
Cliftonville	—	2–0	5–0	6–0	8–1	5–2	6–0	3–2	5–0
Crusaders	0–1	—	0–1	0–6	7–0	1–1	6–1	1–2	5–1
Derry City	0–3	3–1	—	1–6	0–0	1–3	3–1	1–2	4–0
Glentoran	1–2	6–0	7–1	—	3–0	1–1	4–1	3–0	20–0
Larne	0–6	0–0	1–1	0–5	—	0–10	1–2	0–4	7–0
Linfield	0–4	5–0	5–1	1–2	7–1	—	6–0	2–5	7–1
Lisburn Ladies	1–7	0–1	1–1	1–3	2–1	0–7	—	0–1	2–0
Lisburn Rangers	1–8	1–2	6–1	1–7	6–1	0–3	2–2	—	5–0
Mid-Ulster Ladies	0–5	0–0	1–6	0–6	2–4	1–8	1–4	0–3	—

Updated to match(es) played on 13 October 2024. Source: NIFootballLeague.com
Legend: Blue = home team win; Yellow = draw; Red = away team win.
