= 2023 NIFL Women's Premiership League Cup =

Tournament details
- Country: Northern Ireland
- Dates: 14 June 2023 – 31 August 2023
- Teams: 10

Final positions
- Champions: Cliftonville Ladies

Tournament statistics
- Matches played: 9
- Goals scored: 40 (4.44 per match)

The Preliminary round of the Women's Premiership League Cup included the five teams not participating in the Avenir Sports All-Island Cup competition and took place on 14 and 16 June.

The five participating All-Island Cup teams entered at the quarter-final stage the following week.

== Preliminary round ==
Bye for Mid-Ulster Ladies.

14 June 2023	Sion Swifts	6 - 1	Ballymena United	Strabane
19:45 GMT	McGlade 8'; O'Neill 20' (pen.), 87' (pen.); Doherty 34'; Chambers 69'; Crumlish-Hawes 83'		Henry 43' (pen.)	Stadium: Melvin Sports Complex

16 June 2023	Lisburn Ladies	4 - 1	Larne	Lisburn
20:00 GMT	Jennings 15'; McDaid 42'; Murdough 51', 78'	Report	Morrison 6'	Stadium: Bluebell Stadium

== Quarter finals ==
21 June 2023	Cliftonville Ladies	3 - 0	Glentoran Women	Belfast
19:45 GMT				Stadium: Solitude

21 June 2023	Derry City	0 - 4	Crusaders Strikers	Cookstown
19:45 GMT				Stadium: Mid Ulster Sports Arena

21 June 2023	Linfield	5 - 0	Lisburn Ladies	Belfast
19:45 GMT				Stadium: Midgley Park

21 June 2023	Sion Swifts	4 - 0	Mid-Ulster Ladies	Strabane
19:45 GMT				Stadium: Melvin Sports Complex

== Semi Finals ==
5 July 2023	Cliftonville Ladies	6 - 1	Linfield	Belfast
19:45 GMT				Stadium: Solitude

5 July 2023	Crusaders Strikers	0 - 1	Sion Swifts	Belfast
20:00 GMT				Stadium: Seaview

== Final ==
31 August 2023
19:45 GMT

Cliftonville Ladies	3 - 1	Sion Swifts

Stangmore Park, Dungannon
