= 2022 Women's Premiership (Northern Ireland) =

Football league season

Women's Premiership (Northern Ireland)
- Champions: Cliftonville
- Matches: 56
- Goals: 246 (4.39 per match)

The 2022 Northern Irish Women's Premiership, known as the Danske Bank Women's Premiership for sponsorship reasons was the 19th season of the top-tier women's football league in Northern Ireland. Glentoran were the defending champions. Cliftonville won their first league title.

== Teams and locations ==
The following teams made up the 2022 season.

Location of teams in the 2022 season

Teams are listed in alphabetical order.

Team	Location	Stadium	Capacity
Cliftonville	Belfast (Oldpark)	Solitude	2,530
Crusaders Strikers	Belfast (Shore Road)	Seaview	3,383
Derry City	Derry	Brandywell Stadium	3,700
Glentoran	Belfast (Sydenham)	The Oval	26,556
Linfield	Belfast (Boucher Road)	New Midgley Park	n/a
Lisburn Ladies	Lisburn	Bluebell Stadium	1,280
Mid-Ulster Ladies	Cookstown	Mid-Ulster Sports Arena	n/a
Sion Swifts	Strabane	Melvin Sports Complex	n/a

== League table ==
Pos	Team	Pld	W	D	L	GF	GA	GD	Pts	Qualification
1	Cliftonville (C)	14	13	0	1	59	7	+52	39	Qualification for the Champions League first round
2	Glentoran	14	11	2	1	61	9	+52	35	
3	Crusaders Strikers	14	9	2	3	38	19	+19	29	
4	Linfield	14	7	2	5	32	25	+7	23	
5	Sion Swifts	14	6	2	6	30	22	+8	20	
6	Lisburn Ladies	14	2	2	10	13	43	−30	8	
7	Mid-Ulster Ladies	14	1	1	12	11	57	−46	4	
8	Derry City	14	0	3	11	2	64	−62	3	

Updated to match(es) played on 22 October 2022. Source:

For the 2022 season, no team was relegated as the league was to increase to ten teams from the 2023 season onwards.

== Results ==
Home \ Away	CLI	CRS	DER	GLE	LIN	LIS	MID	SIO
Cliftonville	—	4–1	6–0	3–0	4–0	4–1	8–0	2–0
Crusaders	1–2	—	3–0	0–0	1–1	5–2	4–1	2–1
Derry City	0–7	0–7	—	0–10	1–3	0–0	0–2	0–3
Glentoran	3–1	5–0	7–0	—	7–1	4–0	10–1	3–1
Linfield	1–3	0–1	7–0	0–4	—	2–1	6–0	1–1
Lisburn Ladies	0–5	0–5	0–0	0–4	1–4	—	2–0	1–5
Mid-Ulster Ladies	0–6	2–4	1–1	1–3	0–4	2–4	—	1–2
Sion Swifts	0–4	1–4	8–0	1–1	1–2	3–1	3–0	—

Updated to match(es) played on 22 October 2022. Source:
Legend: Blue = home team win; Yellow = draw; Red = away team win.
