= 2026 IFA Women's Challenge Cup =

Tournament details
- Country: Northern Ireland
- Dates: 12 June 2026 – 24 October 2026
- Teams: 23
- All statistics correct as of 22 May 2026.

The IFA Women's Challenge Cup or Irish Women's Cup is the annual cup competition of women's football teams in Northern Ireland.
The 2026 edition will be the 21st edition of the competition, having been first contested in 2005. The current holders are Cliftonville, having won in both 2024 and 2025.

== First Round ==
12 June 2026
19:30

Antrim Town Women	w/o	Ballynagross Ladies

12 June 2026
19:30

Ballyclare Comrades Ladies	2–3	Ballymena United FC Women

12 June 2026
19:30

Limavady United Ladies	0–9	Maiden City Ladies

12 June 2026
19:30

Mid Ulster Ladies	2–0	Wellington Rec. Women

12 June 2026
19:30

Omagh Town Ladies	1–12	Craigavon City Ladies

12 June 2026
19:30

Sion Swifts Ladies	w/o	Oxford Sunnyside Ladies

12 June 2026
19:30

Strabane Athletic Ladies	2–3	Bangor Ladies

- Comber Rec. Ladies receive a bye to the Second Round

== Second Round ==
- Winners of seven ties in the First Round
- Comber Rec. Ladies (bye)
- Eight teams from Women's Premiership
15 July 2026
19:30

Glentoran Women	7–0	Comber Rec. Ladies

17 July 2026
19:30

Cliftonville	3–2	Lisburn Rangers Ladies

17 July 2026
19:30

Craigavon City Ladies	0–2	Ballymena United FC Women

17 July 2026
19:30

Derry City Women	9–1	Bangor Ladies

17 July 2026
19:30

Linfield Women	11–0	Mid Ulster Ladies

17 July 2026
19:30

Lisburn Ladies	8–0	Maiden City Ladies

17 July 2026
19:30

Sion Swifts Ladies	2–2	Larne Women
Penalties
	3–1

17 July 2026
19:30

Antrim Town Women	w/o	Crusaders Strikers

== Quarter-Finals ==
21 August 2026
19:30

Cliftonville	3 – 0	Derry City Women

21 August 2026
19:30

Glentoran Women	2 – 1	Linfield Women

21 August 2026
20:00

Ballymena United Women	0 – 1	Lisburn Ladies

21 August 2026
20:00

Crusaders Strikers	2 – 1	Sion Swifts Ladies

== Semi-Finals ==
11 September 2026
20:00

Lisburn Ladies	0–1	Glentoran Women

11 September 2026
20:00

Crusaders Strikers	0–3	Cliftonville

== Final ==
27 October 2026

Cliftonville Ladies	0 – 0	Glentoran Women
Penalties
	2 - 4
