= 2025 Women's Premiership (Northern Ireland) =

Football league season

Women's Premiership (Northern Ireland)
- Season: 2025
- Dates: 9 May 2025 – 17 October 2025
- Champions: Glentoran
- Matches: 68
- Goals: 277 (4.07 per match)
- All statistics correct as of 17 October 2025.

The 2025 Northern Irish Women's Premiership, currently branded as Sports Direct Women's Premiership for sponsorship reasons, is the 22nd season of the top-tier women's football league in Northern Ireland. Cliftonville are the defending champions. The 2025 season will see a decrease in the number of teams in the league to eight, with the loss of Mid-Ulster Ladies F.C..

== Teams and locations ==
The following teams make up the 2025 season.

Location of teams in the 2025 season

Teams are listed in alphabetical order.

Team	Location	Stadium	Capacity
Cliftonville	Belfast (Oldpark)	Solitude	2,530
Crusaders Strikers	Belfast (Shore Road)	Seaview	3,383
Derry City	Derry	Brandywell Stadium	3,700
Glentoran	Belfast (Sydenham)	Blanchflower Stadium	1,100
Larne	Larne	Inver Park	3,250
Linfield	Belfast (Boucher Road)	New Midgley Park	n/a
Lisburn Ladies	Lisburn	Bluebell Stadium	1,280
Lisburn Rangers	Glenavy	Crewe Park	n/a

== League table ==
Pos	Team	Pld	W	D	L	GF	GA	GD	Pts	Qualification or relegation
1	Glentoran	17	16	0	1	67	11	+56	48	Qualification for the Champions League first round
2	Cliftonville	17	14	1	2	45	8	+37	43	
3	Linfield	17	10	1	6	60	27	+33	31	
4	Lisburn Rangers	17	8	0	9	30	35	−5	24	
5	Crusaders Strikers	17	8	0	9	30	43	−13	24	
6	Derry City	17	6	0	11	22	38	−16	18	
7	Lisburn Ladies	17	3	1	13	11	48	−37	10	
8	Larne	17	1	1	15	12	67	−55	4	

Source: NIFootballLeague.com

== Results ==
Home \ Away	CLI	CRS	DER	GLE	LAR	LIN	LIS	LIR
Cliftonville	—	2–1	3–0	0–2	8–0	1–1	6–0	3–1
Crusaders	0–3	—	4–2	0–8	4–1	0–6	2–1	0–2
Derry City	1–3	3–1	—	2–4	1–4	0–4	1–0	0–1
Glentoran	0–2	5–0	4–0	—	1–0	3–0	8–0	4–1
Larne	0–5	2–4	0–4	1–4	—	1–9	0–2	1–3
Linfield	0–2	2–1	5–1	2–6	11–0	—	5–0	5–2
Lisburn Ladies	0–2	0–2	0–2	1–6	0–0	0–6	—	1–3
Lisburn Rangers	0–2	0–5	2–0	1–2	5–0	2–3	1–0	—

Updated to match(es) played on 17 Oct 2025. Source: NIFootballLeague.com
Legend: Blue = home team win; Yellow = draw; Red = away team win.

=== After Split (Games 15-17) ===
Section A

Home \ Away	CLI	GLE	LIN	LIR
Cliftonville	—	—	2–1	1–0
Glentoran	1–0	—	—	8–1
Linfield	—	0–1	—	—
Lisburn Rangers	—	—	5–0	—

Updated to match(es) played on 17 Oct 2025. Source: NIFootballLeague.com
Legend: Blue = home team win; Yellow = draw; Red = away team win.

Section B

Home \ Away	CRS	DER	LAR	LIS
Crusaders	—	0–3	3–2	—
Derry City	—	—	1–0	1–3
Larne	—	—	—	0–2
Lisburn Ladies	1–3	—	—	—

Updated to match(es) played on 17 Oct 2025. Source: NIFootballLeague.com
Legend: Blue = home team win; Yellow = draw; Red = away team win.
