= 2020 Women's Premiership (Northern Ireland) =

Women's Premiership (Northern Ireland)
- Champions: Glentoran
- Women's Champions League: Glentoran
- Matches: 30
- Goals: 120 (4 per match)
- Biggest home win: Sion Swifts 8–0 Derry City (17 September 2020)
- Biggest away win: Derry City 0–7 Linfield (24 September 2020)
- Highest scoring: Cliftonville 4–6 Sion Swifts (24 September 2020)
- Longest unbeaten run: Glentoran (6 matches)
- Longest winless run: Derry City (10 matches)
- Longest losing run: Derry City (10 matches)

The 2020 Northern Irish Women's Premiership was the 17th season of the top-tier women's football league in Northern Ireland. Linfield were the defending champions.

Glentoran won the league for the eighth time.

== Teams and locations ==
The following teams make up the 2020 season.

Location of teams in the 2020 season

Teams are listed in alphabetical order.

Team	Location	Stadium	Capacity
Cliftonville	Belfast (Oldpark)	Solitude	2,530
Crusaders Strikers	Belfast (Shore Road)	Seaview	3,383
Derry City	Drumahoe	Brandywell Stadium	3,700
Glentoran	Belfast (Sydenham)	The Oval	26,556
Linfield	Belfast (Boucher Road)	New Midgley Park	n/a
Sion Swifts	Strabane	3G Melvin Complex	n/a

== League table ==
Pos	Team	Pld	W	D	L	GF	GA	GD	Pts	Qualification
1	Glentoran (C)	10	8	1	1	25	5	+20	25	Qualification for the Champions League first round
2	Linfield	10	7	1	2	26	12	+14	22	
3	Sion Swifts	10	5	3	2	33	17	+16	18	
4	Crusaders Strikers	10	5	1	4	20	9	+11	16	
5	Cliftonville	10	2	0	8	16	30	−14	6	
6	Derry City	10	0	0	10	0	47	−47	0	

Updated to match(es) played on 24 April 2021. Source:
(C) Champions

== Results ==
Home \ Away	CLI	CRS	DER	GLE	LIN	SIO
Cliftonville	—	0–7	2–0	0–3	2–3	4–6
Crusaders Strikers	2–1	—	3–0	0–2	0–1	2–1
Derry City	0–6	0–5	—	0–3	0–7	0–6
Glentoran	4–0	1–0	3–0	—	2–0	
Linfield	2–0	2–0	4–0	1–4	—	4–2
Sion Swifts	3–1	1–1	8–0	4–3	2–2	—

Updated to match(es) played on 10 December 2020. Source:
Legend: Blue = home team win; Yellow = draw; Red = away team win.
