= 2026 Women's Premiership (Northern Ireland) =

Football league season

Women's Premiership (Northern Ireland)
- Season: 2026
- Dates: 1 May 2026 – 4 October 2026
- Champions: Cliftonville
- Matches: 68
- Goals: 330 (4.85 per match)
- All statistics correct as of 4 October 2026.

The 2026 Northern Irish Women's Premiership, currently branded as Sports Direct Women's Premiership for sponsorship reasons, is the 23rd season of the top-tier women's football league in Northern Ireland.

Glentoran are the defending champions.

== Teams and locations ==
The following teams make up the 2026 season.

Location of teams in the 2026 season

Teams are listed in alphabetical order.

Team	Location	Stadium	Capacity
Cliftonville	Belfast (Oldpark)	Solitude	2,530
Crusaders Strikers	Belfast (Shore Road)	Seaview	3,383
Derry City	Derry	Brandywell Stadium	3,700
Glentoran	Belfast (Sydenham)	Blanchflower Stadium	1,100
Larne	Larne	Inver Park	3,250
Linfield	Belfast (Boucher Road)	New Midgley Park	n/a
Lisburn Ladies	Lisburn	Bluebell Stadium	1,280
Lisburn Rangers	Glenavy	Crewe Park	n/a

== League table ==
Pos	Team	Pld	W	D	L	GF	GA	GD	Pts	Qualification or relegation
1	Cliftonville (C)	17	15	1	1	73	13	+60	46	Qualification for the Champions League first qualifying round
2	Glentoran	17	12	1	4	62	21	+41	37	
3	Linfield	17	11	2	4	67	27	+40	35	
4	Lisburn Rangers	17	8	1	8	38	40	−2	25	
5	Crusaders Strikers	17	6	4	7	33	58	−25	22	
6	Derry City	17	6	2	9	35	39	−4	20	
7	Lisburn Ladies	17	1	3	13	11	61	−50	6	
8	Larne	17	1	2	14	11	71	−60	5	

Source: NIFootballLeague.com

== Results ==
Home \ Away	CLI	CRS	DER	GLE	LAR	LIN	LIS	LIR
Cliftonville	—	9–0	5–1	3–1	3–0	3–2	5–0	3–4
Crusaders	0–7	—	3–1	2–4	3–0	1–9	1–1	2–2
Derry City	0–4	3–3	—	0–1	7–0	1–2	1–0	0–3
Glentoran	1–2	5–1	3–1	—	5–0	4–2	7–0	5–0
Larne	0–8	2–2	1–6	1–7	—	0–9	1–2	0–3
Linfield	1–3	7–1	5–0	2–2	2–0	—	8–1	3–0
Lisburn Ladies	0–7	0–3	0–1	0–4	1–1	1–6	—	0–3
Lisburn Rangers	0–3	1–3	3–2	0–6	5–1	5–2	6–0	—

Updated to match(es) played on 7 Sept 2026. Source: NIFootballLeague.com
Legend: Blue = home team win; Yellow = draw; Red = away team win.

=== After Split (Games 15-17) ===
==== Section A ====
Home \ Away	CLI	GLE	LIN	LIR
Cliftonville	—	4–1	—	3–0
Glentoran	—	—	2–3	4–0
Linfield	1–1	—	—	—
Lisburn Rangers	—	—	2–3	—

Updated to match(es) played on 4 Oct 2026. Source: NIFootballLeague.com
Legend: Blue = home team win; Yellow = draw; Red = away team win.

==== Section B ====
Home \ Away	CRS	DER	LAR	LIS
Crusaders	—	2–3	3–2	—
Derry City	—	—	5–1	3–3
Larne	—	—	—	1–0
Lisburn Ladies	2–3	—	—	—

Updated to match(es) played on 4 Oct 2026. Source: NIFootballLeague.com
Legend: Blue = home team win; Yellow = draw; Red = away team win.
