= 2026 NIFL Women's Premiership League Cup =

BOYLE Sports Women's Cup

Tournament details
- Country: Northern Ireland
- Dates: 1 April – 5 July 2026
- Teams: 8

Tournament statistics
- Matches played: 13
- Goals scored: 57 (4.38 per match)

The 2026 edition is the 7th playing of the NIFL Women's Premiership League Cup, now known as the BOYLE Sports Women's Cup.

BOYLE Sports have become the new title sponsor of the NIFL Women's League Cup for the 2026 season.

This season's competition starts on 1 April, with both groups battling it out for their place in the final. Each team will play three group games, with the winners the two groups earning their place in the showpiece final.

== Group A ==
1 April 2026
19:45

Linfield	3 - 1	Crusaders Strikers
Neill 3' (o.g.); Chambers 8'; Breen 54'	Report	Mann 24'

Midgley Park, Belfast
1 April 2026
20:00

Lisburn Ladies	0 - 2	Glentoran Women
	Report	Vance 10'; Kerr 37'

Bluebell Stadium, Lisburn

22 April 2026
20:00

Crusaders Strikers	1 - 4	Glentoran Women

Seaview, Belfast
22 April 2026
19:45

Linfield	8 - 0	Lisburn Ladies

Midgley Park, Belfast

26 April 2026
15:00

Crusaders Strikers	2 - 3	Lisburn Ladies

Seaview, Belfast
26 April 2026
17:00

Glentoran Women	3 - 1	Linfield

Blanchflower Stadium, Belfast

=== League table ===
Pos	Team	Pld	W	D	L	GF	GA	GD	Pts	Qualification
1	Glentoran	3	3	0	0	9	2	+7	9	Qualification for the Final
2	Linfield	3	2	0	1	12	4	+8	6	
3	Lisburn Ladies	3	1	0	2	3	12	−9	3	
4	Crusaders Strikers	3	0	0	3	4	10	−6	0	

Source: NIFootballLeague.com

== Group B ==
12 April 2026
15:00

Lisburn Rangers	3 - 1	Derry City

Crewe Park, Lisburn

17 April 2026
19:45

Derry City	1 - 3	Cliftonville

Mill Meadow, Castledawson
17 April 2026
19:45

Larne	2 - 1	Lisburn Rangers

Larne Academy of Sport, Larne

22 April 2026
20:00

Derry City	4 - 0	Larne

Mill Meadow, Castledawson
26 April 2026
15:00

Cliftonville	1 - 1	Lisburn Rangers

Solitude, Belfast

04 May 2026
19:45

Larne	0 - 8	Cliftonville

Larne Academy of Sport, Larne

=== League table ===
Pos	Team	Pld	W	D	L	GF	GA	GD	Pts	Qualification
1	Cliftonville	3	2	1	0	12	2	+10	7	Qualification for the Final
2	Lisburn Rangers	3	1	1	1	5	4	+1	4	
3	Derry City	3	1	0	2	6	6	0	3	
4	Larne	3	1	0	2	2	13	−11	3	

Source: NIFootballLeague.com

== Final ==
5 July 2026
15:00 GMT

Glentoran	0–4	Cliftonville

Seaview, Belfast
