= 2021 Women's Premiership (Northern Ireland) =

Women's association football league

Women's Premiership (Northern Ireland)
- Champions: Glentoran (9th title)
- Women's Champions League: Glentoran
- Matches played: 60
- Highest scoring: Cliftonville 12–0 Derry City (18 August 2021)

The 2021 Northern Irish Women's Premiership, was the 18th season of the top-tier women's football league in Northern Ireland. Glentoran were the defending champions.

Glentoran won their ninth league title, and second consecutive title, after a 3–2 home victory over Cliftonville in the penultimate round of fixtures on 21 September 2021.

For the 2021 season, no team was relegated as the league was to increase to eight teams for the 2022 season with a view to making the league professional in the 2023 season.

== Teams and locations ==
Location of teams in the 2021 season

The following teams made up the 2021 season.

Teams are listed in alphabetical order.

Team	Location	Stadium	Capacity
Cliftonville	Belfast (Oldpark)	Solitude	2,530
Crusaders Strikers	Belfast (Shore Road)	Seaview	3,383
Derry City	Derry	Brandywell Stadium	3,700
Glentoran	Belfast (Sydenham)	The Oval	26,556
Linfield	Belfast (Boucher Road)	New Midgley Park	n/a
Sion Swifts	Strabane	Melvin Sports Complex	n/a

== League table ==
Pos	Team	Pld	W	D	L	GF	GA	GD	Pts	Promotion, qualification or relegation
1	Glentoran (C)	20	17	1	2	81	16	+65	52	Qualification for the Champions League first round
2	Cliftonville	20	16	1	3	73	27	+46	49	
3	Crusaders Strikers	20	9	1	10	32	30	+2	28	
4	Sion Swifts	20	7	1	12	32	41	−9	22	
5	Linfield	20	6	2	12	35	61	−26	20	
6	Derry City	20	2	0	18	13	91	−78	6	

Updated to match(es) played on 06 October 2021. Source:

== Results ==
Home \ Away	CLI	CRS	DER	GLE	LIN	SIO	CLI	CRS	DER	GLE	LIN	SIO
Cliftonville	—	4–1	12–0	4–2	3–2	3–2	—	2–1	9–0	0–4	0–0	6–2
Crusaders Strikers	0–1	—	4–1	1–2	1–0	2–1	1–3	—	3–0	0–2	6–2	2–1
Derry City	0–4	0–1	—	2–8	1–4	1–0	1–6	2–1	—	0–7	1–6	0–4
Glentoran	4–1	1–0	3–0	—	3–0	4–1	3–2	3–0	9–1	—	9–0	3–1
Linfield	1–4	1–3	3–1	1–1	—	3–0	2–5	2–1	4–1	0–9	—	3–4
Sion Swifts	0–1	2–2	2–1	0–3	6–0	—	1–3	0–2	1–0	2–1	2–1	—

Updated to match(es) played on 06 October 2021. Source:
Legend: Blue = home team win; Yellow = draw; Red = away team win.
