= 2023–24 UEFA Women's Champions League qualifying rounds =

Tournament details
- Dates: 6 September–18 October 2023
- Teams: 66

The 2023–24 UEFA Women's Champions League qualifying rounds began on 6 September and ended on 18 October 2023.

A total of 66 teams competed in the group stage qualifying rounds of the 2023–24 UEFA Women's Champions League, which included two rounds, with 44 teams in the Champions Path and 22 teams in the League Path. The 12 winners in the round 2 (seven from Champions Path, five from League Path) advanced to the group stage, to join the four teams that entered in that round.

Times are CEST (UTC+2), as listed by UEFA (local times, if different, are in parentheses).

== Teams ==
=== Champions Path ===
The Champions Path included all league champions which do not qualified directly for the group stage, and consisted of the following rounds:

- Round 1 (41 teams playing one-legged semi-finals, final and third place match): 41 teams entered in this round.
- Round 2 (14 teams): three teams entered in this round and eleven winners of the round 1 finals.

Below are the participating teams of the Champions Path (with their 2023 UEFA club coefficients), grouped by the starting rounds.

Key to colours
Winners of round 2 advance to group stage

Round 2
Team	Coeff.
(Czech Republic) Slavia Prague	39.233
(Sweden) Rosengård	33.399
(Italy) Roma	21.000

Round 1
Team	Coeff.
(Austria) St. Pölten	30.050
(Scotland) Glasgow City	29.100
(Kazakhstan) BIIK Shymkent	25.700
(Portugal) Benfica	22.800
(Switzerland) Zürich	22.250
(Netherlands) Ajax	18.400
(Albania) Vllaznia	16.800
(Serbia) Spartak Subotica	16.800
(Belgium) Anderlecht	14.400
(Bosnia and Herzegovina) SFK 2000	13.800
(Denmark) HB Køge	12.150
(Ukraine) Vorskla Poltava	12.000
(Cyprus) Apollon Ladies	11.800
(Lithuania) Gintra	11.400
(Iceland) Valur	10.200
(Hungary) Ferencváros	9.900
(Romania) U Olimpia Cluj	9.600
(Slovenia) Mura	9.000
(Belarus) Dinamo Minsk	7.200
(Montenegro) Breznica	7.200
(Norway) Brann	7.100
(Greece) PAOK	6.400
(Croatia) Osijek	6.100
(Estonia) Flora	5.600
(Luxembourg) Racing Union	5.400
(Finland) KuPS	5.200
(Malta) Birkirkara	4.800
(Israel) Kiryat Gat	4.600
(Latvia) SFK Rīga	4.200
(Faroe Islands) KÍ	3.600
(Moldova) Agarista Anenii Noi	3.600
(Republic of Ireland) Shelbourne	3.500
(Slovakia) Spartak Myjava	3.300
(Kosovo) EP-COM Hajvalia	2.900
(Bulgaria) Lokomotiv Stara Zagora	2.800
(Georgia (country)) Samegrelo	2.000
(Poland) Katowice	1.900
(North Macedonia) Ljuboten	1.600
(Turkey) Fomget Gençlik	1.500
(Wales) Cardiff City	1.100
(Northern Ireland) Cliftonville	0.900

=== League Path ===
The League Path included all league non-champions and consisted of the following rounds:

- Round 1 (16 teams playing one-legged semi-finals, final and third place match): 16 teams entered in this round.
- Round 2 (10 teams): six teams entered in this round and four winners of the round 1 finals.

Below are the participating teams of the League Path (with their 2022 UEFA club coefficients), grouped by the starting rounds.

Key to colours
Winners of round 2 advance to group stage

Round 2
Team	Coeff.
(Germany) VfL Wolfsburg	104.333
(France) Paris Saint-Germain	97.166
(Spain) Real Madrid	37.233
(Czech Republic) Sparta Prague	27.233
(Sweden) BK Häcken	22.399
(England) Manchester United	12.366

Round 1
Team	Coeff.
(England) Arsenal	56.366
(Italy) Juventus	43.000
(Denmark) Brøndby	29.650
(Belarus) FC Minsk	22.200
(France) Paris FC	18.166
(Germany) Eintracht Frankfurt	17.333
(Spain) Levante	17.233
(Netherlands) Twente	15.400
(Sweden) Linköping	13.399
(Norway) Vålerenga	12.100
(Czech Republic) Slovácko	7.233
(Austria) Sturm Graz	6.550
(Kazakhstan) Okzhetpes	5.700
(Scotland) Celtic	5.100
(Ukraine) Kryvbas Kryvyi Rih	4.000
(Iceland) Stjarnan	3.700

== Format ==
Round 1 consisted of mini-tournaments with two semi-finals, a final and a third-place play-off hosted by one of the participating teams. If the score was level at the end of normal time, extra time would have been played, and if the same number of goals was scored by both teams during extra time, the tie would have been decided by a penalty shoot-out. Round 2 was played over two legs, with each team playing one leg at home. The team that scored more goals on aggregate over the two legs advance to the next round. If the aggregate score was level at the end of normal time of the second leg, extra time would have been played, and if the same number of goals was scored by both teams at the end of normal time, the tie would have been decided by a penalty shoot-out. An additional preliminary round consisting of two-legged home-and-away matches would have been played by the champions from the lowest-ranked associations if more than 50 associations had entered the tournament and the title holders had not qualified through league position. Since only 50 associations entered, this round was skipped.

In the draws for each round, teams were seeded based on their UEFA club coefficients at the beginning of the season, with the teams divided into seeded and unseeded pots containing the same number of teams. Prior to the draws, UEFA may form "groups" in accordance with the principles set by the Club Competitions Committee, but they were purely for convenience of the draw and did not resemble any real groupings in the sense of the competition. Teams from associations with political conflicts as decided by UEFA were not drawn into the same tie. After the draws, the order of legs of a tie could have been reversed by UEFA due to scheduling or venue conflicts.

== Schedule ==
The schedule of the competition was as follows (all draws were held at the UEFA headquarters in Nyon, Switzerland).

Schedule for 2023–24 UEFA Women's Champions League qualifying rounds
Round	Draw date	First leg	Second leg
Round 1	30 June 2023	6 September 2023 (semi-finals)	9 September 2023 (third-place play-off & final)
Round 2	15 September 2023	10–11 October 2023	18–19 October 2023

== Round 1 ==
=== Seeding ===
The draw for Round 1 was held on 30 June 2023.

Seeding of teams for the semi-final round was based on their 2023 UEFA club coefficients, with 22 seeded teams and 19 unseeded teams in the Champions Path, and eight seeded teams and eight unseeded teams in the League Path. Teams were drawn into two semi-finals within each four team group and, for the groups with three teams, the team with the highest coefficient was given a bye to the final. In the semi-finals, seeded teams were considered the "home" team, while in the third-place play-offs and finals, the teams with the highest coefficients were considered the "home" team for administrative purposes. Due to political reasons, teams from the following associations could not be drawn into the same group: Kosovo / Bosnia and Herzegovina; Kosovo / Serbia; Kosovo / Russia; Ukraine / Belarus.

Champions Path
Seeded	Unseeded
(Austria) St. Pölten; (Scotland) Glasgow City; (Kazakhstan) BIIK Shymkent; (Portugal) Benfica; (Switzerland) Zürich; (Netherlands) Ajax; (Albania) Vllaznia; (Serbia) Spartak Subotica; (Belgium) Anderlecht; (Bosnia and Herzegovina) SFK 2000; (Denmark) HB Køge; (Ukraine) Vorskla Poltava; (Cyprus) Apollon Ladies; (Lithuania) Gintra; (Iceland) Valur; (Hungary) Ferencváros; (Romania) U Olimpia Cluj; (Slovenia) Mura; (Belarus) Dinamo Minsk; (Montenegro) Breznica; (Norway) Brann	(Greece) PAOK; (Croatia) Osijek; (Estonia) Flora; (Luxembourg) Racing Union; (Finland) KuPS; (Malta) Birkirkara; (Israel) Kiryat Gat; (Latvia) SFK Rīga; (Faroe Islands) KÍ; (Moldova) Agarista Anenii Noi; (Republic of Ireland) Shelbourne; (Slovakia) Spartak Myjava; (Kosovo) EP-COM Hajvalia; (Bulgaria) Lokomotiv Stara Zagora; (Georgia (country)) Samegrelo; (Poland) Katowice; (North Macedonia) Ljuboten; (Turkey) Fomget Gençlik; (Wales) Cardiff City; (Northern Ireland) Cliftonville

League Path
Seeded	Unseeded
(England) Arsenal; (Italy) Juventus; (Denmark) Brøndby; (Belarus) FC Minsk; (France) Paris FC; (Germany) Eintracht Frankfurt; (Spain) Levante; (Netherlands) Twente	(Sweden) Linköping; (Norway) Vålerenga; (Czech Republic) Slovácko; (Austria) Sturm Graz; (Kazakhstan) Okzhetpes; (Scotland) Celtic; (Ukraine) Kryvbas Kryvyi Rih; (Iceland) Stjarnan

=== Champions Path ===
==== Tournament 1 ====
===== Bracket =====
Hosted by U Olimpia Cluj.

Semi-finals
6 September
(Hungary) Ferencváros	2 (1)
(Israel) Kiryat Gat (p)	2 (3)
6 September
(Romania) U Olimpia Cluj	6
(Slovakia) Spartak Myjava	2

Final
9 September
(Israel) Kiryat Gat	0 (3)
(Romania) U Olimpia Cluj (p)	0 (4)
Third place
9 September
(Hungary) Ferencváros	7
(Slovakia) Spartak Myjava	0

===== Semi-finals =====
6 September 2023
10:00

Ferencváros (Hungary)	2–2 (a.e.t.)	(Israel) Kiryat Gat
Vágó 14'; Németh 112'	Report	Dany Helena 19'; Adubea 114'
Penalties
Csigi (penalty missed); Vágó (penalty missed); Németh (penalty scored); Stanović (penalty missed)	1–3	(penalty scored) Sandrinha; (penalty scored) Helena; (penalty scored) Plaskievics

Stadionul Cetate, Alba Iulia
Attendance: 250
Referee: Irena Velevačkoska (North Macedonia)

6 September 2023
15:00

U Olimpia Cluj (Romania)	6–2	(Slovakia) Spartak Myjava
Johnson 2'; Bâtea 20'; Honkova 45+3' (o.g.); Marcu 45+4'; Čermakova 78' (o.g.); Țabur 83'	Report	Kucharčikova 9'; Bogorova 76'

Stadionul Cetate, Alba Iulia
Attendance: 350
Referee: Lisa Benn (England)

===== Third-place play-off =====
9 September 2023
10:00

Ferencváros (Hungary)	7–0	(Slovakia) Spartak Myjava
Ott 12'; Vágó 24'; Pusztai 40'; V. Szabó 56'; Stanović 66'; Garcia 79' (pen.), 90+8'	Report

Stadionul Cetate, Alba Iulia
Attendance: 60
Referee: Maria Ennsgraber (Austria)

===== Final =====
9 September 2023
15:00

U Olimpia Cluj (Romania)	0–0 (a.e.t.)	(Israel) Kiryat Gat
	Report
Penalties
Marcu (penalty scored); Bumbar (penalty missed); Blazek (penalty scored); Sigheartau (penalty scored); Lindahl (penalty scored)	4–3	(penalty missed) Sandrinha; (penalty scored) Helena; (penalty scored) Plaskievics; (penalty scored) Biru; (penalty missed) Workou

Stadionul Cetate, Alba Iulia
Attendance: 628
Referee: Lucie Šulcová (Czech Republic)

==== Tournament 2 ====
===== Bracket =====
Hosted by SFK 2000.

Semi-finals
6 September
(Ukraine) Vorskla Poltava (a.e.t.)	4
(Estonia) Flora	3
6 September
(Bosnia and Herzegovina) SFK 2000	0
(Croatia) Osijek	4

Final
9 September
(Ukraine) Vorskla Poltava	3
(Croatia) Osijek	0
Third place
9 September
(Estonia) Flora	3
(Bosnia and Herzegovina) SFK 2000	5

===== Semi-finals =====
6 September 2023
11:00

Vorskla Poltava (Ukraine)	4–3 (a.e.t.)	(Estonia) Flora
Kozlova 27'; Kotyk 44'; Korsun 88'; Kravchuk 93'	Report	Tammik 38'; Lillemäe 47'; Uleksin 78'

Olimpijski Stadion Asim Ferhatović Hase, Sarajevo
Attendance: 50
Referee: Sofik Torosyan (Armenia)

6 September 2023
17:00

SFK 2000 (Bosnia and Herzegovina)	0–4	(Croatia) Osijek
	Report	Balić 15', 19'; Spahić 34' (o.g.); Joščak 62'

Olimpijski Stadion Asim Ferhatović Hase, Sarajevo
Attendance: 1,002
Referee: Marisca Overtoom (Netherlands)

===== Third-place play-off =====
9 September 2023
11:00

SFK 2000 (Bosnia and Herzegovina)	5–3	(Estonia) Flora
Terzić 1', 24'; Gačanica 10', 40'; Krajnić 90+2'	Report	Tammik 13'; Saar 21', 69'

Olimpijski Stadion Asim Ferhatović Hase, Sarajevo
Attendance: 100
Referee: Silvia Gasperotti (Italy)

===== Final =====
9 September 2023
17:00

Vorskla Poltava (Ukraine)	3–0	(Croatia) Osijek
Andrukhiv 13', 45+2'; Kozlova 27'	Report

Olimpijski Stadion Asim Ferhatović Hase, Sarajevo
Attendance: 85
Referee: Miriama Matulová (Slovakia)

==== Tournament 3 ====
===== Bracket =====
Hosted by Mura.

Semi-finals
6 September
(Cyprus) Apollon Ladies	9
(North Macedonia) Ljuboten	0
6 September
(Slovenia) Mura	0 (4)
(Georgia (country)) Samegrelo (p)	0 (5)

Final
9 September
(Cyprus) Apollon Ladies	3
(Georgia (country)) Samegrelo	0
Third place
9 September
(North Macedonia) Ljuboten	1
(Slovenia) Mura	7

===== Semi-finals =====
6 September 2023
11:00

Apollon Ladies (Cyprus)	9–0	(North Macedonia) Ljuboten
Dantas 2', 40', 57'; Nasello 24', 79'; Anokye 29', 47'; Brinkman 44'; E. Giannou 90'	Report

Športni park Radenci, Radenci
Attendance: 121
Referee: Tatyana Sorokopudova (Kazakhstan)

6 September 2023
17:00

Mura (Slovenia)	0–0 (a.e.t.)	(Georgia (country)) Samegrelo
	Report
Penalties
Kos (penalty scored); Kolbl (penalty scored); Dolinar (penalty missed); Plavšić (penalty scored); Testen (penalty scored); Bomfim (penalty missed)	4–5	(penalty scored) Monteiro da Silva; (penalty scored) Villegas; (penalty scored) Bukhrikidze; (penalty missed) Enjibadze; (penalty scored) Milchevska; (penalty scored) Mtskerashvili

Mestni stadion Fazanerija, Murska Sobota
Attendance: 823
Referee: Fatemeh Zangeneh (Norway)

===== Third-place play-off =====
9 September 2023
11:00

Mura (Slovenia)	7–1	(North Macedonia) Ljuboten
Plavšić 10', 31'; Matos 12', 51'; Kolbl 45+3', 46', 62'	Report	Silva 23'

Športni park Radenci, Radenci
Attendance: 120
Referee: Jeļena Jermolajeva (Latvia)

===== Final =====
9 September 2023
17:00

Apollon Ladies (Cyprus)	3–0	(Georgia (country)) Samegrelo
Watson 9'; Manisha 72'; Dantas 87'	Report

Mestni stadion Fazanerija, Murska Sobota
Attendance: 130
Referee: Simona Ghisletta (Switzerland)

==== Tournament 4 ====
===== Bracket =====
Hosted by HB Køge.

Semi-finals
6 September
(Serbia) Spartak Subotica	7
(Faroe Islands) KÍ	0
6 September
(Denmark) HB Køge	1
(Finland) KuPS	2

Final
9 September
(Serbia) Spartak Subotica	2
(Finland) KuPS	1
Third place
9 September
(Faroe Islands) KÍ	1
(Denmark) HB Køge	3

===== Semi-finals =====
6 September 2023
15:30

Spartak Subotica (Serbia)	7–0	(Faroe Islands) KÍ
Slović 20'; Martins 30'; Boaduwaa 34'; Filipović 56'; Langdok 60'; Stupar 62'; Uvalin 78'	Report

Køge Stadium, Køge
Attendance: 270
Referee: Cristina Trandafir (Romania)

6 September 2023
19:00

HB Køge (Denmark)	1–2	(Finland) KuPS
Fløe 30'	Report	Begolli 48'; Sharts 90+3'

Køge Stadium, Køge
Attendance: 981
Referee: Jurgita Mačikunytė (Lithuania)

===== Third-place play-off =====
9 September 2023
12:30

HB Køge (Denmark)	3–1	(Faroe Islands) KÍ
Kramer 14', 16'; Uhre 33'	Report	Hummeland 61'

Køge Stadium, Køge
Attendance: 367
Referee: Ioanna Allayiotou (Cyprus)

===== Final =====
9 September 2023
16:00

Spartak Subotica (Serbia)	2–1	(Finland) KuPS
Boaduwaa 11', 63'	Report	Kröger 3'

Køge Stadium, Køge
Attendance: 247
Referee: Liudmyla Telbukh (Ukraine)

==== Tournament 5 ====
===== Bracket =====
Hosted by Katowice.

Semi-finals
6 September
(Norway) Brann	5
(Bulgaria) Lokomotiv Stara Zagora	0
6 September
(Belgium) Anderlecht	5
(Poland) Katowice	0

Final
9 September
(Norway) Brann	3
(Belgium) Anderlecht	0
Third place
9 September
(Bulgaria) Lokomotiv Stara Zagora	0 (1)
(Poland) Katowice (p)	0 (3)

===== Semi-finals =====
6 September 2023
14:00

Brann (Norway)	5–0	(Bulgaria) Lokomotiv Stara Zagora
Kvamme 2'; Renmark 41'; Brochmann 47', 85', 89'	Report

Municipal Stadium in Katowice, Katowice
Attendance: 74
Referee: Marina Živković (Serbia)

6 September 2023
20:00

Anderlecht (Belgium)	5–0	(Poland) Katowice
Vătafu 17'; Buabadi 36'; De Caigny 39'; Jacobs 45'; Ouzraoui Diki 90+1'	Report

Municipal Stadium in Katowice, Katowice
Attendance: 1,965
Referee: Araksya Saribekyan (Armenia)

===== Third-place play-off =====
9 September 2023
14:00

Lokomotiv Stara Zagora (Bulgaria)	0–0 (a.e.t.)	(Poland) Katowice
	Report
Penalties
Skorynina (penalty missed); Petkova (penalty missed); Dimitrova (penalty scored); Ivanova (penalty missed)	1–3	(penalty scored) Hajduk; (penalty missed) Turkiewicz; (penalty scored) Konkol; (penalty scored) Krakowiak

Municipal Stadium in Katowice, Katowice
Attendance: 271
Referee: Teresa Oliveira (Portugal)

===== Final =====
9 September 2023
20:00

Anderlecht (Belgium)	0–3	(Norway) Brann
	Report	Haugland 22'; Crummer 28'; Eikeland 84'

Municipal Stadium in Katowice, Katowice
Attendance: 58
Referee: Anastasiya Romanyuk (Ukraine)

==== Tournament 6 ====
===== Bracket =====
Hosted by Benfica.

Semi-finals
6 September
(Kazakhstan) BIIK Shymkent	0
(Latvia) SFK Rīga	1
6 September
(Portugal) Benfica	8
(Northern Ireland) Cliftonville	1

Final
9 September
(Latvia) SFK Rīga	0
(Portugal) Benfica	4
Third place
9 September
(Kazakhstan) BIIK Shymkent	4
(Northern Ireland) Cliftonville	2

===== Semi-finals =====
6 September 2023
15:00

BIIK Shymkent (Kazakhstan)	0–1	(Latvia) SFK Rīga
	Report	Teļukeviča 70'

Benfica Campus, Seixal
Attendance: 56
Referee: Katalin Sipos (Hungary)

6 September 2023
21:00

Benfica (Portugal)	8–1	(Northern Ireland) Cliftonville
Alidou 25'; Norney 34' (o.g.); Alves 36', 73'; Falcón 42'; Martins 49', 55'; Nogueira 76'	Report	McGuinness 61'

Benfica Campus, Seixal
Attendance: 1,014
Referee: Oxana Cruc (Moldova)

===== Third-place play-off =====
9 September 2023
12:00

BIIK Shymkent (Kazakhstan)	4–2	(Northern Ireland) Cliftonville
Lungu 19', 85'; Nurusheva 20'; Gabelia 74'	Report	Maxwell 45+1'; Callaghan 68' (pen.)

Benfica Campus, Seixal
Attendance: 54
Referee: Zoe Stavrou (Cyprus)

===== Final =====
9 September 2023
19:00

Benfica (Portugal)	4–0	(Latvia) SFK Rīga
Nazareth 3', 7'; Falcón 16'; Norton 21'	Report

Benfica Campus, Seixal
Attendance: 1,119
Referee: Kateryna Usova (Ukraine)

==== Tournament 7 ====
===== Bracket =====
Hosted by Vllaznia.

Semi-finals
6 September
(Iceland) Valur	2
(Turkey) Fomget Gençlik	1
6 September
(Albania) Vllaznia	4
(Kosovo) EP-COM Hajvalia	2

Final
9 September
(Iceland) Valur	2
(Albania) Vllaznia	1
Third place
9 September
(Turkey) Fomget Gençlik	6
(Kosovo) EP-COM Hajvalia	0

===== Semi-finals =====
6 September 2023
10:00

Valur (Iceland)	2–1	(Turkey) Fomget Gençlik
Ágústsdóttir 29'; Halldórsdóttir 33'	Report	Sadıkoğlu 47'

Loro Boriçi Stadium, Shkodër
Attendance: 50
Referee: Anastasia Mylopoulou (Greece)

6 September 2023
18:00

Vllaznia (Albania)	4–2	(Kosovo) EP-COM Hajvalia
Berisha 16', 90+2'; Gjini 44'; Bashka 60'	Report	Misini 34'; Mahmuti 68'

Loro Boriçi Stadium, Shkodër
Attendance: 150
Referee: Jelena Kumer (Croatia)

===== Third-place play-off =====
9 September 2023
12:00

EP-COM Hajvalia (Kosovo)	0–6	(Turkey) Fomget Gençlik
	Report	Violari 32'; Bulatović 39' (pen.); Šabanagić 51'; Sadıkoğlu 59'; Marcano 71', 89'

Loro Boriçi Stadium, Shkodër
Attendance: 40
Referee: Franziska Wildfeuer (Germany)

===== Final =====
9 September 2023
18:00

Vllaznia (Albania)	1–2	(Iceland) Valur
Doci 90+1'	Report	Ágústsdóttir 23'; Björgvinsdóttir 81'

Loro Boriçi Stadium, Shkodër
Attendance: 1,700
Referee: Olivia Tschon (Austria)

==== Tournament 8 ====
===== Bracket =====
Hosted by Gintra.

Semi-finals
6 September
(Scotland) Glasgow City	2
(Republic of Ireland) Shelbourne	0
6 September
(Lithuania) Gintra	2
(Wales) Cardiff City	0

Final
9 September
(Scotland) Glasgow City	3
(Lithuania) Gintra	0
Third place
9 September
(Republic of Ireland) Shelbourne	3
(Wales) Cardiff City	0

===== Semi-finals =====
6 September 2023
11:00

Glasgow City (Scotland)	2–0	(Republic of Ireland) Shelbourne
Lovera 54'; Davidson 65'	Report

Siauliai central stadium, Šiauliai
Attendance: 100
Referee: Ifeoma Kulmala (Finland)

6 September 2023
17:00

Gintra (Lithuania)	2–0	(Wales) Cardiff City
Bassey 21' (pen.), 49'	Report

Siauliai central stadium, Šiauliai
Attendance: 550
Referee: Martina Molinaro (Italy)

===== Third-place play-off =====
9 September 2023
11:00

Shelbourne (Republic of Ireland)	3–0	(Wales) Cardiff City
Murray 37', 53'; Moore 64'	Report

Siauliai central stadium, Šiauliai
Attendance: 120
Referee: Caroline Lanssens (Belgium)

===== Final =====
9 September 2023
17:00

Glasgow City (Scotland)	3–0	(Lithuania) Gintra
Lovera 1'; Weir 29'; Davidson 67'	Report

Siauliai central stadium, Šiauliai
Attendance: 550
Referee: Andromachi Tsiofliki (Greece)

==== Tournament 9 ====
===== Bracket =====
Hosted by St. Pölten.

Semi-finals
6 September
(Greece) PAOK	6
(Luxembourg) Racing Union	1

Final
9 September
(Austria) St. Pölten	3
(Greece) PAOK	0

===== Semi-final =====
6 September 2023
18:00

PAOK (Greece)	6–1	(Luxembourg) Racing Union
Helmvall 7', 21', 31', 41'; Vardali 70'; Papadopoulou 90+6'	Report	Estevez 69'

NV Arena, Sankt Pölten
Attendance: 169
Referee: Cansu Tiryaki (Turkey)

===== Final =====
9 September 2023
18:00

St. Pölten (Austria)	3–0	(Greece) PAOK
Brunnthaler 14'; Mädl 22'; Lemešová 29'	Report

NV Arena, Sankt Pölten
Attendance: 783
Referee: Kirsty Dowle (England)

==== Tournament 10 ====
===== Bracket =====
Hosted by Agarista Anenii Noi.

Semi-finals
6 September
(Belarus) Dinamo Minsk	9
(Moldova) Agarista Anenii Noi	0

Final
9 September
(Netherlands) Ajax	3
(Belarus) Dinamo Minsk	0

===== Semi-final =====
6 September 2023
17:00

Dinamo Minsk (Belarus)	9–0	(Moldova) Agarista Anenii Noi
Kubichnaya 3', 11', 75'; Pilipenko 18', 38'; Valiuk 29'; Linnik 36'; Shlapakova 40'; Sitnikava 69'	Report

CSR Orhei, Orhei
Attendance: 234
Referee: Lovisa Johansson (Sweden)

===== Final =====
9 September 2023
17:00

Ajax (Netherlands)	3–0	(Belarus) Dinamo Minsk
Leuchter 30', 86'; Spitse 43' (pen.)	Report

CSR Orhei, Orhei
Attendance: 320
Referee: Karoline Wacker (Germany)

==== Tournament 11 ====
===== Bracket =====
Hosted by Birkirkara.

Semi-finals
6 September
(Montenegro) Breznica	0
(Malta) Birkirkara	1

Final
9 September
(Switzerland) Zürich	3
(Malta) Birkirkara	1

===== Semi-finals =====
6 September 2023
18:00

Breznica (Montenegro)	0–1	(Malta) Birkirkara
	Report	García Falero 90+2'

Centenary Stadium, Ta' Qali
Attendance: 366
Referee: Frederikke Lydia Søkjær (Denmark)

===== Final =====
9 September 2023
18:00

Zürich (Switzerland)	3–1	(Malta) Birkirkara
Piubel 34'; Bernauer 54'; Pinther 79'	Report	Chircop 90+4'

Centenary Stadium, Ta' Qali
Attendance: 305
Referee: Fabienne Michel (Germany)

=== League Path ===
==== Tournament 1 ====
===== Bracket =====
Hosted by Twente.

Semi-finals
6 September
(Spain) Levante	4
(Iceland) Stjarnan	0
6 September
(Netherlands) Twente	6
(Austria) Sturm Graz	0

Final
9 September
(Spain) Levante	2
(Netherlands) Twente	3
Third place
9 September
(Iceland) Stjarnan (p)	0 (7)
(Austria) Sturm Graz	0 (6)

===== Semi-finals =====
6 September 2023
13:00

Levante (Spain)	4–0	(Iceland) Stjarnan
Gabi 48', 61', 89'; Redondo 79'	Report

Sportpark Schreurserve, Enschede
Attendance: 52
Referee: Stacey Pearson (England)

6 September 2023
19:00

Twente (Netherlands)	6–0	(Austria) Sturm Graz
Rijsbergen 15', 17'; R. Jansen 23'; Te Brake 42'; Vliek 53'; Kroese 66'	Report

Sportpark Schreurserve, Enschede
Attendance: 523
Referee: Volha Blotskaya (Belarus)

===== Third-place play-off =====
9 September 2023
13:30

Sturm Graz (Austria)	0–0 (a.e.t.)	(Iceland) Stjarnan
	Report
Penalties
Glibo (penalty scored); Maierhofer (penalty missed); Uka (penalty scored); Petersen (penalty scored); Tragl (penalty scored); Kirschstein (penalty scored); Gierzinger (penalty missed); Krajinović (penalty scored); Kössler (penalty missed)	6–7	(penalty missed) Pálsdóttir; (penalty scored) Ragnarsdóttir; (penalty scored) Gunnarsdóttir; (penalty scored) Jónsdóttir; (penalty scored) Heiðarsdóttir; (penalty scored) Hassett; (penalty missed) Baldursdóttir; (penalty scored) Arnþórsdóttir; (penalty scored) Sigurðardóttir

Sportpark Schreurserve, Enschede
Attendance: 106
Referee: Emanuela Rusta (Albania)

===== Final =====
9 September 2023
19:30

Levante (Spain)	2–3	(Netherlands) Twente
Tomás 14'; Redondo 20'	Report	R. Jansen 34'; Auée 43'; Te Brake 69'

Sportpark Schreurserve, Enschede
Attendance: 720
Referee: Minka Vekkeli (Finland)

==== Tournament 2 ====
===== Bracket =====
Hosted by Eintracht Frankfurt.

Semi-finals
6 September
(Italy) Juventus	6
(Kazakhstan) Okzhetpes	0
6 September
(Germany) Eintracht Frankfurt	1
(Czech Republic) Slovácko	0

Final
9 September
(Italy) Juventus	1 (4)
(Germany) Eintracht Frankfurt (p)	1 (5)
Third place
9 September
(Kazakhstan) Okzhetpes	0
(Czech Republic) Slovácko	3

===== Semi-finals =====
6 September 2023
13:00

Juventus (Italy)	6–0	(Kazakhstan) Okzhetpes
Girelli 6', 58'; Lenzini 31'; Caruso 45+4'; Cantore 90+1'; Palis 90+5'	Report

Stadion am Brentanobad, Frankfurt
Attendance: 300
Referee: Shona Shukrula (Netherlands)

6 September 2023
18:30

Eintracht Frankfurt (Germany)	1–0	(Czech Republic) Slovácko
Prašnikar 24'	Report

Stadion am Brentanobad, Frankfurt
Attendance: 2,923
Referee: Michalina Diakow (Poland)

===== Third-place play-off =====
9 September 2023
18:30

Slovácko (Czech Republic)	3–0	(Kazakhstan) Okzhetpes
Mcnesby 24'; Polášková 27'; Klímová 83'	Report

Waldstadion, Frankfurt
Attendance: 180
Referee: Ana Maria Terteleac (Romania)

===== Final =====
9 September 2023
13:00

Juventus (Italy)	1–1 (a.e.t.)	(Germany) Eintracht Frankfurt
Cantore 48'	Report	Prašnikar 66'
Penalties
Boattin (penalty scored); Cascarino (penalty missed); Sembrant (penalty scored); Girelli (penalty scored); Beerensteyn (penalty missed); Gama (penalty scored); Nyström (penalty missed)	4–5	(penalty scored) Freigang; (penalty scored) Kleinherne; (penalty missed) Hanshaw; (penalty missed) Pawollek; (penalty scored) Dunst; (penalty scored) Reuteler; (penalty scored) Wamser

Waldstadion, Frankfurt
Attendance: 6,100
Referee: Melis Özçiğdem (Turkey)

==== Tournament 3 ====
===== Bracket =====
Hosted by Linköping.

Semi-finals
6 September
(England) Arsenal	3
(Sweden) Linköping	0
6 September
(France) Paris FC	4
(Ukraine) Kryvbas Kryvyi Rih	0

Final
9 September
(England) Arsenal	3 (2)
(France) Paris FC (p)	3 (4)
Third place
9 September
(Sweden) Linköping	3
(Ukraine) Kryvbas Kryvyi Rih	0

===== Semi-finals =====
6 September 2023
17:00

Arsenal (England)	3–0	(Sweden) Linköping
Foord 53'; Hurtig 81'; Blackstenius 90'	Report

Linköping Arena, Linköping
Attendance: 7,805
Referee: Deborah Anex (Switzerland)

6 September 2023
21:00

Paris FC (France)	4–0	(Ukraine) Kryvbas Kryvyi Rih
Dufour 25', 56', 59'; Korošec 72'	Report

Linköping Arena, Linköping
Attendance: 255
Referee: Merima Čelik (Bosnia and Herzegovina)

===== Third-place play-off =====
9 September 2023
19:00

Linköping (Sweden)	3–0	(Ukraine) Kryvbas Kryvyi Rih
Abam 41', 65'; Momiki 45+1'	Report

Linköping Arena, Linköping
Attendance: 495
Referee: Deborah Bianchi (Italy)

===== Final =====
9 September 2023
15:00

Arsenal (England)	3–3 (a.e.t.)	(France) Paris FC
Russo 80', 116'; Beattie 90+6'	Report	Bourdieu 56', 57'; Fleury 106'
Penalties
Little (penalty scored); McCabe (penalty scored); Maanum (penalty missed); Russo (penalty missed)	2–4	(penalty scored) Greboval; (penalty scored) Ould Hocine; (penalty scored) Matéo; (penalty missed) Corboz; (penalty scored) Ribadeira

Linköping Arena, Linköping
Attendance: 1,411
Referee: Kristina Georgieva (Bulgaria)

==== Tournament 4 ====
===== Bracket =====
Hosted by Vålerenga.

Semi-finals
6 September
(Denmark) Brøndby	0
(Scotland) Celtic	1
6 September
(Belarus) FC Minsk	1
(Norway) Vålerenga	3

Final
9 September
(Scotland) Celtic	2 (10)
(Norway) Vålerenga (p)	2 (11)
Third place
9 September
(Denmark) Brøndby	2
(Belarus) FC Minsk	1

===== Semi-finals =====
6 September 2023
14:00

Brøndby (Denmark)	0–1	(Scotland) Celtic
	Report	Clark 69'

Intility Arena, Oslo
Attendance: 109
Referee: Gamze Durmuş (Turkey)

6 September 2023
20:00

FC Minsk (Belarus)	1–3	(Norway) Vålerenga
Kiskonen 41' (pen.)	Report	Löfwenius 9'; Sævik 44'; Tennebø 83'

Intility Arena, Oslo
Attendance: 1,367
Referee: Rasa Grigonė (Lithuania)

===== Third-place play-off =====
9 September 2023
14:00

Brøndby (Denmark)	2–1	(Belarus) FC Minsk
Asaula 49' (o.g.); Buchberg 81'	Report	Mashina 8'

Intility Arena, Oslo
Attendance: 20
Referee: Jelena Međedović (Serbia)

===== Final =====
9 September 2023
20:00

Vålerenga (Norway)	2–2 (a.e.t.)	(Scotland) Celtic
Tvedten 5'; Thorsnes 120+3' (pen.)	Report	Loferski 9'; Smith 116'
Penalties
Thorsnes (penalty scored); Tvedten (penalty scored); Thomsen (penalty scored); Löfwenius (penalty scored); Sigurðardóttir (penalty scored); Kovacs (penalty scored); Vickius (penalty scored); Brekken (penalty scored); Pechersky (penalty scored); Pettersen (penalty scored); Rogic (penalty scored)	11–10	(penalty scored) Clark; (penalty scored) McAneny; (penalty scored) Partido; (penalty scored) Craig; (penalty scored) Shen Mengyu; (penalty scored) Burchill; (penalty scored) Shen Menglu; (penalty scored) Agnew; (penalty scored) Hayes; (penalty scored) Goldie; (penalty missed) Daugherty

Intility Arena, Oslo
Attendance: 1,295
Referee: Olatz Rivera Olmedo (Spain)

== Round 2 ==
=== Seeding ===
A total of 24 teams played in Round 2. The draw took place on 15 September 2023.

Seeding of teams was based on their 2023 UEFA club coefficients, with seven seeded and unseeded teams in the Champions Path, and five seeded and unseeded teams in the League Path. Teams were drawn into two-legged-ties, where the first drawn team played the first leg at home and teams from the same association could not be drawn against each other.

Champions Path
Seeded	Unseeded
(Czech Republic) Slavia Prague; (Sweden) Rosengård; (Austria) St. Pölten; (Scotland) Glasgow City; (Portugal) Benfica; (Switzerland) Zürich; (Italy) Roma	(Netherlands) Ajax; (Serbia) Spartak Subotica; (Ukraine) Vorskla Poltava; (Cyprus) Apollon Ladies; (Iceland) Valur; (Romania) U Olimpia Cluj; (Norway) Brann

League Path
Seeded	Unseeded
(Germany) VfL Wolfsburg; (France) Paris Saint-Germain; (Spain) Real Madrid; (Czech Republic) Sparta Prague; (Sweden) BK Häcken	(France) Paris FC; (Germany) Eintracht Frankfurt; (Netherlands) Twente; (England) Manchester United; (Norway) Vålerenga

=== Summary ===
The first legs were played on 10 and 11 October, and the second legs on 18 October 2023.

The winners of the ties advanced to the group stage.

Champions Path
Team 1	Agg.	Team 2	1st leg	2nd leg
Apollon Ladies (Cyprus)	0–11	(Portugal) Benfica	0–7	0–4
Zürich (Switzerland)	0–8	(Netherlands) Ajax	0–6	0–2
Roma (Italy)	9–1	(Ukraine) Vorskla Poltava	3–0	6–1
Valur (Iceland)	1–4	(Austria) St. Pölten	0–4	1–0
Slavia Prague (Czech Republic)	11–0	(Romania) U Olimpia Cluj	5–0	6–0
Glasgow City (Scotland)	0–6	(Norway) Brann	0–4	0–2
Spartak Subotica (Serbia)	2–7	(Sweden) Rosengård	1–2	1–5

League Path
Team 1	Agg.	Team 2	1st leg	2nd leg
BK Häcken (Sweden)	4–3	(Netherlands) Twente	2–2	2–1
Real Madrid (Spain)	5–1	(Norway) Vålerenga	2–1	3–0
Eintracht Frankfurt (Germany)	8–0	(Czech Republic) Sparta Prague	5–0	3–0
Paris FC (France)	5–3	(Germany) VfL Wolfsburg	3–3	2–0
Manchester United (England)	2–4	(France) Paris Saint-Germain	1–1	1–3

==== Champions Path ====
11 October 2023
15:00

Apollon Ladies (Cyprus)	0–7	(Portugal) Benfica
	Report	Nazareth 11'; Alidou 20', 78'; C. Costa 34' (pen.); Cintra 58'; J. Silva 90+1', 90+2'

Tsirio Stadium, Limassol
Attendance: 285
Referee: Elvira Nurmustafina (Kazakhstan)
18 October 2023
20:30

Benfica (Portugal)	4–0	(Cyprus) Apollon Ladies
Almeida 57'; Nazareth 65'; Alidou 71'; Ucheibe 78'	Report

Benfica Campus, Seixal
Attendance: 489
Referee: Ivana Martinčić (Croatia)

Benfica won 11–0 on aggregate.

11 October 2023
20:00

Zürich (Switzerland)	0–6	(Netherlands) Ajax
	Report	Sabajo 9'; Grant 34'; Leuchter 47', 56', 60'; Tolhoek 89'

Letzigrund, Zürich
Attendance: 3,507
Referee: Maria Marotta (Italy)
18 October 2023
19:00

Ajax (Netherlands)	2–0	(Switzerland) Zürich
Leuchter 73', 78'	Report

Sportpark De Toekomst, Ouder-Amstel
Attendance: 1,405
Referee: Jelena Cvetković (Serbia)

Ajax won 8–0 on aggregate.

11 October 2023
14:30

Roma (Italy)	3–0	(Ukraine) Vorskla Poltava
Viens 15'; Giugliano 57'; Giacinti 64'	Report

Stadio Tre Fontane, Rome
Attendance: 820
Referee: Désirée Grundbacher (Switzerland)
18 October 2023
14:30

Vorskla Poltava (Ukraine)	1–6	(Italy) Roma
Kozlova 51'	Report	Viens 35'; Latorre 56'; Di Guglielmo 58', 68'; Kotyk 83' (o.g.), 86' (o.g.)

Stadio Tre Fontane, Rome, Italy (Note: Due to the Russian invasion of Ukraine, Ukrainian teams are required to play their home matches at neutral venues until further notice.)
Attendance: 420
Referee: Olatz Rivera Olmedo (Spain)

Roma won 9–1 on aggregate.

10 October 2023
20:00

Valur (Iceland)	0–4	(Austria) St. Pölten
	Report	Mattner 13'; Schumacher 53'; Mädl 59', 63'

Hlíðarendi, Reykjavík
Attendance: 228
Referee: Zuzana Valentová (Slovakia)
18 October 2023
19:00

St. Pölten (Austria)	0–1	(Iceland) Valur
	Report	Dissing 75'

NV Arena, Sankt Pölten
Attendance: 984
Referee: Catarina Campos (Portugal)

St. Pölten won 4–1 on aggregate.

11 October 2023
18:00

Slavia Prague (Czech Republic)	5–0	(Romania) U Olimpia Cluj
Nekesa 4', 9'; Khýrová 42'; Divišová 81'; Křivská 89'	Report

Fortuna Arena, Prague
Attendance: 1,940
Referee: Shona Shukrula (Netherlands)
18 October 2023
17:00

U Olimpia Cluj (Romania)	0–6	(Czech Republic) Slavia Prague
	Report	Nekesa 10'; Morávková 45'; McLaughlin 62'; Šurnovská 72'; Stackpole 75'; Khýrová 83'

Cluj Arena, Cluj-Napoca
Attendance: 250
Referee: Deborah Anex (Switzerland)

Slavia Prague won 11–0 on aggregate.

11 October 2023
20:35

Glasgow City (Scotland)	0–4	(Norway) Brann
	Report	Engesvik 5', 39'; Eikeland 13'; Lund 86'

Petershill Park, Glasgow
Attendance: 865
Referee: Ewa Augustyn (Poland)
18 October 2023
19:00

Brann (Norway)	2–0	(Scotland) Glasgow City
Østenstad 34'; Lie 86'	Report

Brann Stadion, Bergen
Attendance: 8,633
Referee: Marta Huerta de Aza (Spain)

Brann won 6–0 on aggregate.

11 October 2023
15:00

Spartak Subotica (Serbia)	1–2	(Sweden) Rosengård
Belovan 28'	Report	Seger 9'; Öling 72'

TSC Arena, Bačka Topola
Attendance: 425
Referee: Lucie Šulcová (Czech Republic)
18 October 2023
18:00

Rosengård (Sweden)	5–1	(Serbia) Spartak Subotica
Kadowaki 26'; Andersson 34'; Schough 45+1'; Holdt 80'; Arnardóttir 85'	Report	Filipović 90+1'

Malmö IP, Malmö
Attendance: 1,120
Referee: Iuliana Demetrescu (Romania)

Rosengård won 7–2 on aggregate.

==== League Path ====
11 October 2023
18:30

BK Häcken (Sweden)	2–2	(Netherlands) Twente
Schröder 45+2'; Kosola 47'	Report	Ziemer 15'; Vliek 53'

Bravida Arena, Gothenburg
Attendance: 1,356
Referee: Eszter Urban (Hungary)
18 October 2023
19:00

Twente (Netherlands)	1–2	(Sweden) BK Häcken
Vliek 33'	Report	Anvegård 61'; Schröder 65'

De Grolsch Veste, Enschede
Attendance: 8,067
Referee: Eleni Antoniou (Greece)

BK Häcken won 4–3 on aggregate.

11 October 2023
20:00

Real Madrid (Spain)	2–1	(Norway) Vålerenga
Zornoza 4'; Gálvez 44'	Report	Rogic 27'

Alfredo Di Stéfano, Madrid
Attendance: 2,143
Referee: Sabina Bolić (Croatia)
18 October 2023
19:30

Vålerenga (Norway)	0–3	(Spain) Real Madrid
	Report	Toletti 29'; Feller 68'; del Castillo 90+5'

Intility Arena, Oslo
Attendance: 6,341
Referee: Alina Peşu (Romania)

Real Madrid won 5–1 on aggregate.

10 October 2023
19:00

Eintracht Frankfurt (Germany)	5–0	(Czech Republic) Sparta Prague
Anyomi 6'; Freigang 14' (pen.), 75', 77'; Reuteler 58'	Report

Waldstadion, Frankfurt
Attendance: 5,500
Referee: Kristina Georgieva (Bulgaria)
18 October 2023
18:30

Sparta Prague (Czech Republic)	0–3	(Germany) Eintracht Frankfurt
	Report	Dunst 18', 33', 43'

Stadion Letná, Prague
Attendance: 1,464
Referee: Abigail Byrne (England)

Eintracht Frankfurt won 8–0 on aggregate.

10 October 2023
19:00

Paris FC (France)	3–3	(Germany) VfL Wolfsburg
Thiney 8'; Bourdieu 16'; Dufour 44'	Report	Endemann 4'; Popp 30', 73'

Stade Sébastien Charléty, Paris
Attendance: 3,257
Referee: Minka Vekkeli (Finland)
18 October 2023
18:45

VfL Wolfsburg (Germany)	0–2	(France) Paris FC
	Report	Dufour 38'; Fleury 90'

AOK Stadion, Wolfsburg
Attendance: 3,747
Referee: Tess Olofsson (Sweden)

Paris FC won 5–3 on aggregate.

10 October 2023
21:00

Manchester United (England)	1–1	(France) Paris Saint-Germain
Malard 70'	Report	Chawinga 54'

Leigh Sports Village, Leigh
Attendance: 4,827
Referee: Frida Klarlund (Denmark)
18 October 2023
20:00

Paris Saint-Germain (France)	3–1	(England) Manchester United
Martens 17', 48'; Baltimore 57'	Report	Naalsund 47'

Parc des Princes, Paris
Attendance: 10,358
Referee: Ivana Projkovska (North Macedonia)

Paris Saint-Germain won 4–2 on aggregate.
