= 2023–24 UEFA Women's Champions League =

European women's football competition

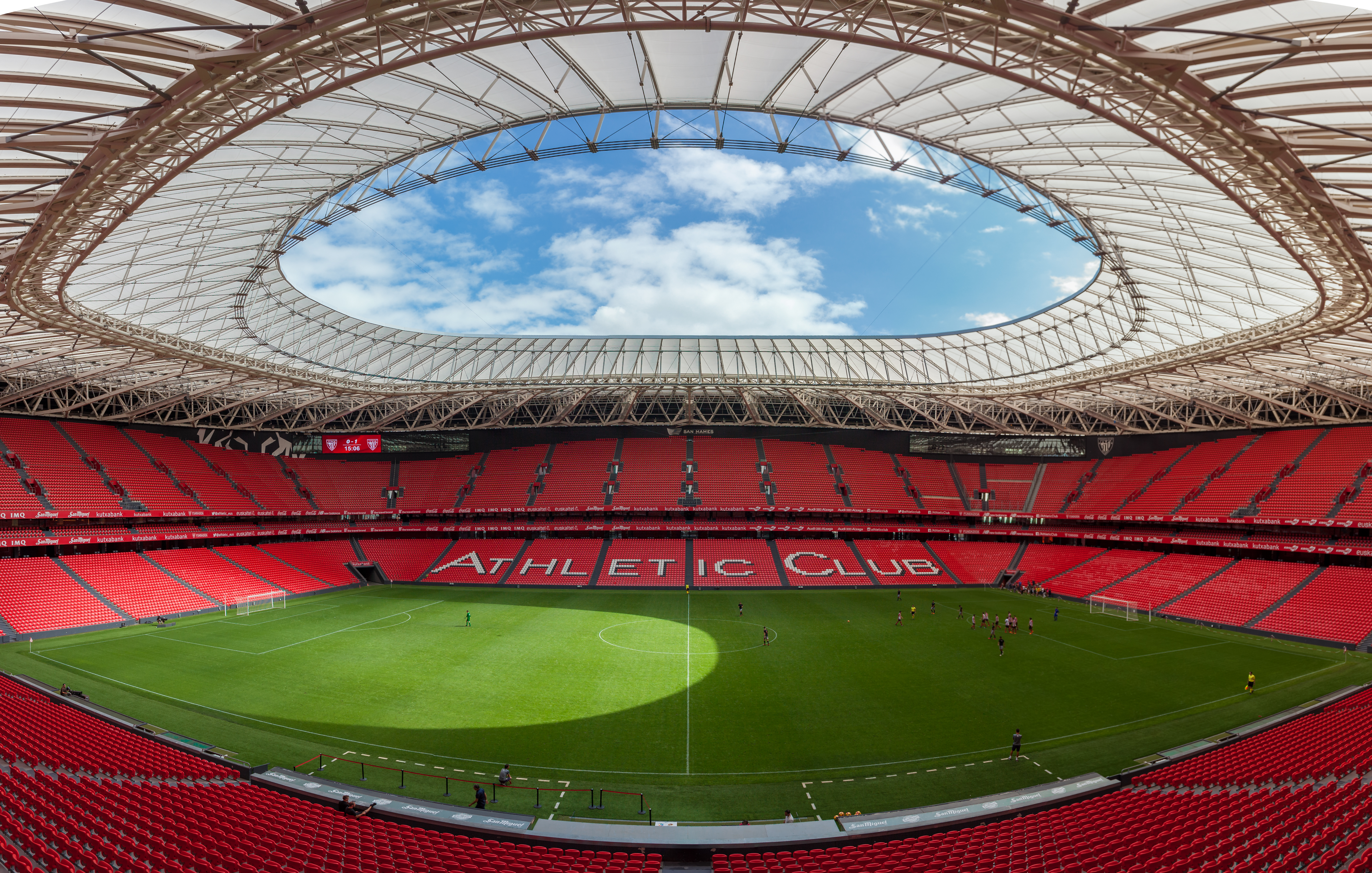
- The San Mamés Stadium in Bilbao hosted the final

Tournament details
- Dates: Qualifying rounds: 6 September – 19 October 2023; Competition proper: 14 November 2023 – 25 May 2024
- Teams: Competition proper: 16; Total: 70 (from 49 associations)

Final positions
- Champions: (Royal Spanish Football Federation) Barcelona (3rd title)
- Runners-up: (French Football Federation) Lyon

Tournament statistics
- Matches played: 61
- Goals scored: 192 (3.15 per match)
- Attendance: 563,136 (9,232 per match)
- Top scorer(s): Kadidiatou Diani (Lyon); 8 goals
- Best player: Aitana Bonmatí (Barcelona)
- Best young player: Melchie Dumornay (Lyon)

The 2023–24 UEFA Women's Champions League was the 23rd edition of the European women's club football championship organised by UEFA, and the 15th edition since being rebranded as the UEFA Women's Champions League. It was the third edition to feature a 16-team group stage.

The final was held at San Mamés in Bilbao, Spain. Barcelona were the defending champions, and defended their title with a 2–0 win over Lyon, playing in their home country.

== Association team allocation ==
The association ranking based on the UEFA women's country coefficients was used to determine the number of participating teams for each association:

- Associations 1–6 each had three teams qualify.
- Associations 7–16 each had two teams qualify.
- All other associations, if they entered, each had one team qualify.
- The winners of the 2022–23 UEFA Women's Champions League were given an additional entry if they did not qualify for the 2023–24 UEFA Women's Champions League through their domestic league.

An association had to have an eleven-a-side women's domestic league to enter a team. As of 2022–23, 52 of the 55 UEFA member associations organized a women's domestic league, with the exceptions being Andorra (1 club in Spain), Liechtenstein (3 clubs in Switzerland) and San Marino (1 club in Italy).

=== Association ranking ===
For the 2023–24 UEFA Women's Champions League, the associations were allocated places according to their 2022 UEFA women's Association coefficients, which took into account their performance in European competitions from 2017–18 to 2021–22.

Association ranking for 2023–24 UEFA Women's Champions League

Rank	Association	Coeff.	Teams	Notes
1	France	88.333	3	
2	Germany	75.666	3	
3	Spain	66.166	3	
4	England	66.000	3	
5	Sweden	34.166	3	
6	Czech Republic	33.833	3	
7	Italy	29.500	2	
8	Denmark	27.750	2	
9	Netherlands	24.500	2	
10	Iceland	24.250	2	
11	Kazakhstan	23.000	2	
12	Norway	22.500	2	
13	Scotland	22.000	2	
14	Belarus	19.500	2	
15	Ukraine	18.500	2	
16	Austria	18.500	2	
17	Portugal	18.000	1	
18	Switzerland	17.500	1	
19	Lithuania	15.500	1	

Rank	Association	Coeff.	Teams	Notes
20	Cyprus	15.000	1	
21	Russia	14.250	0	
22	Serbia	14.000	1	
23	Albania	12.000	1	
24	Belgium	12.000	1	
25	Poland	11.000	1	
26	Finland	9.500	1	
27	Bosnia and Herzegovina	9.500	1	
28	Hungary	9.000	1	
29	Romania	9.000	1	
30	Croatia	8.500	1	
31	Greece	8.000	1	
32	Turkey	8.000	1	
33	Republic of Ireland	7.500	1	
34	Slovenia	7.000	1	
35	Bulgaria	6.000	1	
36	Kosovo	5.500	1	
37	Slovakia	5.500	1	

Rank	Association	Coeff.	Teams	Notes
37	Estonia	5.500	1	
39	Montenegro	5.000	1	
40	Wales	4.500	1	
41	Georgia	4.000	1	
42	Israel	4.000	1	
43	Northern Ireland	3.500	1	
44	Luxembourg	3.000	1	
45	Faroe Islands	3.000	1	
46	Malta	2.500	1	
47	Latvia	2.000	1	
47	North Macedonia	2.000	1	
47	Moldova	2.000	1	
47	Armenia	2.000	0	DNE
NR	Azerbaijan	—	0	DNE
NR	Gibraltar	—	0	DNE
NR	Andorra	—	0	NL
NR	Liechtenstein	—	0	NL
NR	San Marino	—	0	NL

=== Distribution ===
Access list for 2023–24 UEFA Women's Champions League
	Path	Teams entering in this round	Teams advancing from previous round
Round 1 (Mini-tournament) (57 teams)	Champions path (41 teams)	41 champions from associations 8–49 (except Russia)	
Round 1 (Mini-tournament) (57 teams)	League path (16 teams)	6 third-placed teams from associations 1–6; 10 second-placed teams from associations 7–16	
Round 2 (24 teams)	Champions path (14 teams)	3 champions from associations 5–7	11 knockout winners of the previous round
Round 2 (24 teams)	League path (10 teams)	6 second-placed teams from associations 1–6	4 knockout winners of the previous round
Group stage (16 Teams)		4 champions from associations 1–4 (including title holders Barcelona)	7 knockout winners of the Champions path; 5 knockout winners of the League path
Knockout stage (8 Teams)			4 group winners from group stage; 4 group runners-up from group stage

Since the Champions League title holders Barcelona have qualified via their domestic leagues, the following changes to the access list have been made:

- The champions of association 4 (England) enter the group stage instead of Round 2 (Champions Path).
- The champions of association 7 (Italy) enter Round 2 instead of Round 1 (Champions Path).

=== Teams ===
The labels in the parentheses show how each team qualified for the place of its starting round:

- TH: Title holders
- 1st, 2nd, 3rd: League positions of the previous season

The two qualifying rounds, round 1 and round 2, were divided into Champions Path (CH) and League Path (LP).

UEFA women's club coefficients.

Qualified teams for 2023–24 UEFA Women's Champions League
Entry round		Teams			
Group stage		(Royal Spanish Football Federation) Barcelona (1st)^{TH}	(French Football Federation) Lyon (1st)	(German Football Association) Bayern Munich (1st)	(The Football Association) Chelsea (1st)
Round 2	CH	(Swedish Football Association) Rosengård (1st)	(Football Association of the Czech Republic) Slavia Prague (1st)	(Italian Football Federation) Roma (1st)	
Round 2	LP	(French Football Federation) Paris Saint-Germain (2nd)	(German Football Association) Wolfsburg (2nd)	(Royal Spanish Football Federation) Real Madrid (2nd)	(The Football Association) Manchester United (2nd)
Round 2	LP	(Swedish Football Association) BK Häcken (2nd)	(Football Association of the Czech Republic) Sparta Prague (2nd)		
Round 1	CH	(Danish Football Association) HB Køge (1st)	(Royal Dutch Football Association) Ajax (1st)	(Football Association of Iceland) Valur (1st)	(Kazakhstan Football Federation) BIIK Shymkent (1st)
Round 1	CH	(Norwegian Football Federation) Brann (1st)	(Scottish Football Association) Glasgow City (1st)	(Football Federation of Belarus) Dinamo Minsk (1st)	(Ukrainian Association of Football) Vorskla Poltava (1st)
Round 1	CH	(Austrian Football Association) St. Pölten (1st)	(Portuguese Football Federation) Benfica (1st)	(Swiss Football Association) Zürich (1st)	(Lithuanian Football Federation) Gintra (1st)
Round 1	CH	(Cyprus Football Association) Apollon Ladies (1st)	(Football Association of Serbia) Spartak Subotica (1st)	(Albanian Football Federation) Vllaznia (1st)	(Royal Belgian Football Association) Anderlecht (1st)
Round 1	CH	(Polish Football Association) Katowice (1st)	(Football Association of Finland) KuPS (1st)	(Football Association of Bosnia and Herzegovina) SFK 2000 (1st)	(Hungarian Football Federation) Ferencváros (1st)
Round 1	CH	(Romanian Football Federation) U Olimpia Cluj (1st)	(Croatian Football Federation) Osijek (1st)	(Hellenic Football Federation) PAOK (1st)	(Turkish Football Federation) Fomget Gençlik (1st)
Round 1	CH	(Football Association of Ireland) Shelbourne (1st)	(Football Association of Slovenia) Mura (1st)	(Bulgarian Football Union) Lokomotiv Stara Zagora (1st)	(Football Federation of Kosovo) EP-COM Hajvalia (1st)
Round 1	CH	(Slovak Football Association) Spartak Myjava (1st)	(Estonian Football Association) Flora (1st)	(Football Association of Montenegro) Breznica (1st)	(Football Association of Wales) Cardiff City (1st)
Round 1	CH	(Georgian Football Federation) Samegrelo (1st)	(Israel Football Association) Kiryat Gat (1st)	(Irish Football Association) Cliftonville (1st)	(Luxembourg Football Federation) Racing Union (1st)
Round 1	CH	(Faroe Islands Football Association) KÍ (1st)	(Malta Football Association) Birkirkara (1st)	(Moldovan Football Federation) Agarista Anenii Noi (1st)	(Latvian Football Federation) SFK Rīga (1st)
Round 1	CH	(Football Federation of Macedonia) Ljuboten (1st)			
Round 1	LP	(French Football Federation) Paris FC (3rd)	(German Football Association) Eintracht Frankfurt (3rd)	(Royal Spanish Football Federation) Levante (3rd)	(The Football Association) Arsenal (3rd)
Round 1	LP	(Swedish Football Association) Linköping (3rd)	(Football Association of the Czech Republic) Slovácko (3rd)	(Italian Football Federation) Juventus (2nd)	(Danish Football Association) Brøndby (2nd)
Round 1	LP	(Royal Dutch Football Association) Twente (2nd)	(Football Association of Iceland) Stjarnan (2nd)	(Kazakhstan Football Federation) Okzhetpes (2nd)	(Norwegian Football Federation) Vålerenga (2nd)
Round 1	LP	(Scottish Football Association) Celtic (2nd)	(Football Federation of Belarus) FC Minsk (2nd)	(Ukrainian Association of Football) Kryvbas Kryvyi Rih (2nd)	(Austrian Football Association) Sturm Graz (2nd)

Notes

1. Russia (RUS): On 28 February 2022, Russian football clubs and national teams were suspended from FIFA and UEFA competitions.

== Schedule ==
The schedule of the competition was as follows.

Schedule for 2023–24 UEFA Women's Champions League
Phase	Round	Draw date	First leg	Second leg
Qualifying	First round	30 June 2023	6 September 2023 (semi-finals)	9 September 2023 (third-place play-off & final)
Qualifying	Second round	15 September 2023	10–11 October 2023	18–19 October 2023
Group stage	Matchday 1	20 October 2023	14–15 November 2023	
Group stage	Matchday 2	20 October 2023	22–23 November 2023	
Group stage	Matchday 3	20 October 2023	13–14 December 2023	
Group stage	Matchday 4	20 October 2023	20–21 December 2023	
Group stage	Matchday 5	20 October 2023	24–25 January 2024	
Group stage	Matchday 6	20 October 2023	30–31 January 2024	
Knockout phase	Quarter-finals	6 February 2024	19–20 March 2024	27–28 March 2024
Knockout phase	Semi-finals	6 February 2024	20–21 April 2024	27–28 April 2024
Knockout phase	Final	6 February 2024	25 May 2024 at San Mamés Stadium, Bilbao	

== Qualifying rounds ==
=== Round 1 ===
A total of 57 teams played in Round 1.

==== Champions Path ====
Tournament 1

Hosted by U Olimpia Cluj.

Semi-finals
6 September
(Hungary) Ferencváros	2 (1)
(Israel) Kiryat Gat (p)	2 (3)
6 September
(Romania) U Olimpia Cluj	6
(Slovakia) Spartak Myjava	2

Final
9 September
(Israel) Kiryat Gat	0 (3)
(Romania) U Olimpia Cluj (p)	0 (4)
Third place
9 September
(Hungary) Ferencváros	7
(Slovakia) Spartak Myjava	0

Tournament 2

Hosted by SFK 2000.

Semi-finals
6 September
(Ukraine) Vorskla Poltava (a.e.t.)	4
(Estonia) Flora	3
6 September
(Bosnia and Herzegovina) SFK 2000	0
(Croatia) Osijek	4

Final
9 September
(Ukraine) Vorskla Poltava	3
(Croatia) Osijek	0
Third place
9 September
(Estonia) Flora	3
(Bosnia and Herzegovina) SFK 2000	5

Tournament 3

Hosted by Mura.

Semi-finals
6 September
(Cyprus) Apollon Ladies	9
(North Macedonia) Ljuboten	0
6 September
(Slovenia) Mura	0 (4)
(Georgia (country)) Samegrelo (p)	0 (5)

Final
9 September
(Cyprus) Apollon Ladies	3
(Georgia (country)) Samegrelo	0
Third place
9 September
(North Macedonia) Ljuboten	1
(Slovenia) Mura	7

Tournament 4

Hosted by HB Køge.

Semi-finals
6 September
(Serbia) Spartak Subotica	7
(Faroe Islands) KÍ	0
6 September
(Denmark) HB Køge	1
(Finland) KuPS	2

Final
9 September
(Serbia) Spartak Subotica	2
(Finland) KuPS	1
Third place
9 September
(Faroe Islands) KÍ	1
(Denmark) HB Køge	3

Tournament 5

Hosted by Katowice.

Semi-finals
6 September
(Norway) Brann	5
(Bulgaria) Lokomotiv Stara Zagora	0
6 September
(Belgium) Anderlecht	5
(Poland) Katowice	0

Final
9 September
(Norway) Brann	3
(Belgium) Anderlecht	0
Third place
9 September
(Bulgaria) Lokomotiv Stara Zagora	0 (1)
(Poland) Katowice (p)	0 (3)

Tournament 6

Hosted by Benfica.

Semi-finals
6 September
(Kazakhstan) BIIK Shymkent	0
(Latvia) SFK Rīga	1
6 September
(Portugal) Benfica	8
(Northern Ireland) Cliftonville	1

Final
9 September
(Latvia) SFK Rīga	0
(Portugal) Benfica	4
Third place
9 September
(Kazakhstan) BIIK Shymkent	4
(Northern Ireland) Cliftonville	2

Tournament 7

Hosted by Vllaznia.

Semi-finals
6 September
(Iceland) Valur	2
(Turkey) Fomget Gençlik	1
6 September
(Albania) Vllaznia	4
(Kosovo) EP-COM Hajvalia	2

Final
9 September
(Iceland) Valur	2
(Albania) Vllaznia	1
Third place
9 September
(Turkey) Fomget Gençlik	6
(Kosovo) EP-COM Hajvalia	0

Tournament 8

Hosted by Gintra.

Semi-finals
6 September
(Scotland) Glasgow City	2
(Republic of Ireland) Shelbourne	0
6 September
(Lithuania) Gintra	2
(Wales) Cardiff City	0

Final
9 September
(Scotland) Glasgow City	3
(Lithuania) Gintra	0
Third place
9 September
(Republic of Ireland) Shelbourne	3
(Wales) Cardiff City	0

Tournament 9

Hosted by St. Pölten.

Semi-finals
6 September
(Greece) PAOK	6
(Luxembourg) Racing Union	1

Final
9 September
(Austria) St. Pölten	3
(Greece) PAOK	0

Tournament 10

Hosted by Agarista Anenii Noi.

Semi-finals
6 September
(Belarus) Dinamo Minsk	9
(Moldova) Agarista Anenii Noi	0

Final
9 September
(Netherlands) Ajax	3
(Belarus) Dinamo Minsk	0

Tournament 11

Hosted by Birkirkara.

Semi-finals
6 September
(Montenegro) Breznica	0
(Malta) Birkirkara	1

Final
9 September
(Switzerland) Zürich	3
(Malta) Birkirkara	1

==== League Path ====
Tournament 1

Hosted by Twente.

Semi-finals
6 September
(Spain) Levante	4
(Iceland) Stjarnan	0
6 September
(Netherlands) Twente	6
(Austria) Sturm Graz	0

Final
9 September
(Spain) Levante	2
(Netherlands) Twente	3
Third place
9 September
(Iceland) Stjarnan (p)	0 (7)
(Austria) Sturm Graz	0 (6)

Tournament 2

Hosted by Eintracht Frankfurt.

Semi-finals
6 September
(Italy) Juventus	6
(Kazakhstan) Okzhetpes	0
6 September
(Germany) Eintracht Frankfurt	1
(Czech Republic) Slovácko	0

Final
9 September
(Italy) Juventus	1 (4)
(Germany) Eintracht Frankfurt (p)	1 (5)
Third place
9 September
(Kazakhstan) Okzhetpes	0
(Czech Republic) Slovácko	3

Tournament 3

Hosted by Linköping.

Semi-finals
6 September
(England) Arsenal	3
(Sweden) Linköping	0
6 September
(France) Paris FC	4
(Ukraine) Kryvbas Kryvyi Rih	0

Final
9 September
(England) Arsenal	3 (2)
(France) Paris FC (p)	3 (4)
Third place
9 September
(Sweden) Linköping	3
(Ukraine) Kryvbas Kryvyi Rih	0

Tournament 4

Hosted by Vålerenga.

Semi-finals
6 September
(Denmark) Brøndby	0
(Scotland) Celtic	1
6 September
(Belarus) FC Minsk	1
(Norway) Vålerenga	3

Final
9 September
(Scotland) Celtic	2 (10)
(Norway) Vålerenga (p)	2 (11)
Third place
9 September
(Denmark) Brøndby	2
(Belarus) FC Minsk	1

=== Round 2 ===
==== Seeding ====
A total of 24 teams played in Round 2. The draw took place on 15 September 2023. The first legs were played on 10 and 11 October, and the second legs on 18 October 2023.

The winners of the ties advanced to the group stage.

Champions Path
Team 1	Agg.	Team 2	1st leg	2nd leg
Apollon Ladies (Cyprus)	0–11	(Portugal) Benfica	0–7	0–4
Zürich (Switzerland)	0–8	(Netherlands) Ajax	0–6	0–2
Roma (Italy)	9–1	(Ukraine) Vorskla Poltava	3–0	6–1
Valur (Iceland)	1–4	(Austria) St. Pölten	0–4	1–0
Slavia Prague (Czech Republic)	11–0	(Romania) U Olimpia Cluj	5–0	6–0
Glasgow City (Scotland)	0–6	(Norway) Brann	0–4	0–2
Spartak Subotica (Serbia)	2–7	(Sweden) Rosengård	1–2	1–5

League Path
Team 1	Agg.	Team 2	1st leg	2nd leg
BK Häcken (Sweden)	4–3	(Netherlands) Twente	2–2	2–1
Real Madrid (Spain)	5–1	(Norway) Vålerenga	2–1	3–0
Eintracht Frankfurt (Germany)	8–0	(Czech Republic) Sparta Prague	5–0	3–0
Paris FC (France)	5–3	(Germany) VfL Wolfsburg	3–3	2–0
Manchester United (England)	2–4	(France) Paris Saint-Germain	1–1	1–3

== Group stage ==
The draw was held 20 October 2023 and saw the 16 teams split into four pools of four teams.

Location of teams of the 2023–24 UEFA Women's Champions League group stage.
Brown: Group A; Red: Group B; Orange: Group C; Yellow: Group D.

=== Group A ===
Pos	Team	Pld	W	D	L	GF	GA	GD	Pts	Qualification	BAR	BEN	FRA	ROS
1	(Spain) Barcelona	6	5	1	0	27	5	+22	16	Advance to quarter-finals	—	5–0	2–0	7–0
2	(Portugal) Benfica	6	2	3	1	9	12	−3	9	Advance to quarter-finals	4–4	—	1–0	1–0
3	(Germany) Eintracht Frankfurt	6	2	1	3	9	8	+1	7		1–3	1–1	—	5–0
4	(Sweden) Rosengård	6	0	1	5	3	23	−20	1		0–6	2–2	1–2	—

Source: UEFA
Rules for classification: Group stage tiebreakers

=== Group B ===
Pos	Team	Pld	W	D	L	GF	GA	GD	Pts	Qualification	LYO	BRA	PRA	PÖL
1	(France) Lyon	6	4	2	0	25	5	+20	14	Advance to quarter-finals	—	3–1	2–2	2–0
2	(Norway) Brann	6	4	1	1	9	7	+2	13	Advance to quarter-finals	2–2	—	1–0	2–1
3	(Czech Republic) Slavia Prague	6	1	2	3	3	13	−10	5		0–9	0–1	—	1–0
4	(Austria) St. Pölten	6	0	1	5	2	14	−12	1		0–7	1–2	0–0	—

Source: UEFA
Rules for classification: Group stage tiebreakers

=== Group C ===
Pos	Team	Pld	W	D	L	GF	GA	GD	Pts	Qualification	PSG	AJA	BAY	ROM
1	(France) Paris Saint-Germain	6	3	1	2	10	8	+2	10	Advance to quarter-finals	—	3–1	0–1	2–1
2	(Netherlands) Ajax	6	3	1	2	7	8	−1	10	Advance to quarter-finals	2–0	—	1–0	2–1
3	(Germany) Bayern Munich	6	1	4	1	8	8	0	7		2–2	1–1	—	2–2
4	(Italy) Roma	6	1	2	3	10	11	−1	5		1–3	3–0	2–2	—

Source: UEFA
Rules for classification: Group stage tiebreakers

=== Group D ===
Pos	Team	Pld	W	D	L	GF	GA	GD	Pts	Qualification	CHE	HAC	PFC	RMA
1	(England) Chelsea	6	4	2	0	15	5	+10	14	Advance to quarter-finals	—	0–0	4–1	2–1
2	(Sweden) BK Häcken	6	3	2	1	6	5	+1	11	Advance to quarter-finals	1–3	—	0–0	2–1
3	(France) Paris FC	6	2	1	3	5	11	−6	7		0–4	1–2	—	2–1
4	(Spain) Real Madrid	6	0	1	5	5	10	−5	1		2–2	0–1	0–1	—

Source: UEFA
Rules for classification: Group stage tiebreakers

== Knockout phase ==
=== Bracket ===
Quarter-finals
(Norway) Brann	1	1	2
(Spain) Barcelona	2	3	5
(Netherlands) Ajax	0	1	1
(England) Chelsea	3	1	4
(Portugal) Benfica	1	1	2
(France) Lyon	2	4	6
(Sweden) Häcken	1	0	1
(France) Paris Saint-Germain	2	3	5

Semi-finals
(Spain) Barcelona	0	2	2
(England) Chelsea	1	0	1
(France) Lyon	3	2	5
(France) Paris Saint-Germain	2	1	3

Final
25 May – Bilbao
(Spain) Barcelona	2
(France) Lyon	0

=== Quarter-finals ===
The draw for the quarter-finals was held on 6 February 2024. The first legs were played on 19 and 20 March, and the second legs on 27 and 28 March 2024.

Team 1	Agg.	Team 2	1st leg	2nd leg
Brann (Norway)	2–5	(Spain) Barcelona	1–2	1–3
Benfica (Portugal)	2–6	(France) Lyon	1–2	1–4
Ajax (Netherlands)	1–4	(England) Chelsea	0–3	1–1
Häcken (Sweden)	1–5	(France) Paris Saint-Germain	1–2	0–3

=== Semi-finals ===
The draw for the semi-finals was held on 6 February 2024 (after the quarter-final draw). The first legs were played on 20 April, and the second legs on 27 and 28 April 2024.

Team 1	Agg.	Team 2	1st leg	2nd leg
Barcelona (Spain)	2–1	(England) Chelsea	0–1	2–0
Lyon (France)	5–3	(France) Paris Saint-Germain	3–2	2–1

=== Final ===
The final was played on 25 May 2024 at the San Mamés Stadium in Bilbao. A draw was held on 6 February 2024 (after the quarter-final and semi-final draws), to determine which semi-final winner was designated as the "home" team for administrative purposes.

25 May 2024
18:00 UTC+2

Barcelona (Spain)	2–0	(France) Lyon
Bonmatí 63'; Putellas 90+5'	Report

San Mamés Stadium, Bilbao
Attendance: 50,827
Referee: Rebecca Welch (England)

== Statistics ==
Statistics exclude qualifying rounds.

=== Top goalscorers ===
Rank	Player	Team	Goals
1	(France) Kadidiatou Diani	(French Football Federation) Lyon	8
2	(France) Marie-Antoinette Katoto	(French Football Federation) Paris Saint-Germain	7
3	(Spain) Aitana Bonmatí	(Royal Spanish Football Federation) Barcelona	6
3	(Spain) Salma Paralluelo	(Royal Spanish Football Federation) Barcelona	6
5	(Canada) Marie-Yasmine Alidou	(Portuguese Football Federation) Benfica	5
5	(Malawi) Tabitha Chawinga	(French Football Federation) Paris Saint-Germain	5
5	(Norway) Caroline Graham Hansen	(Royal Spanish Football Federation) Barcelona	5
5	(Norway) Ada Hegerberg	(French Football Federation) Lyon	5
5	(Australia) Sam Kerr	(The Football Association) Chelsea	5
10	(Germany) Sara Däbritz	(French Football Federation) Lyon	4
10	(Italy) Valentina Giacinti	(Italian Football Federation) Roma	4
10	(Italy) Manuela Giugliano	(Italian Football Federation) Roma	4
10	(Spain) Patricia Guijarro	(Royal Spanish Football Federation) Barcelona	4
10	(Sweden) Rosa Kafaji	(Swedish Football Association) BK Häcken	4
10	(France) Amel Majri	(French Football Federation) Lyon	4

=== Team of the season ===
The UEFA technical study group selected the following players as the team of the tournament.

Pos.	Player	Team
GK	(Chile) Christiane Endler	(French Football Federation) Lyon
DF	(England) Lucy Bronze	(Royal Spanish Football Federation) Barcelona
DF	(Spain) Irene Paredes	(Royal Spanish Football Federation) Barcelona
DF	(England) Jess Carter	(The Football Association) Chelsea
DF	(France) Selma Bacha	(French Football Federation) Lyon
MF	(Spain) Patricia Guijarro	(Royal Spanish Football Federation) Barcelona
MF	(Spain) Aitana Bonmatí	(Royal Spanish Football Federation) Barcelona
MF	(United States) Lindsey Horan	(French Football Federation) Lyon
FW	(Norway) Caroline Graham Hansen	(Royal Spanish Football Federation) Barcelona
FW	(Malawi) Tabitha Chawinga	(French Football Federation) Paris Saint-Germain
FW	(France) Kadidiatou Diani	(French Football Federation) Lyon

=== Player of the season ===
- (Spain) Aitana Bonmatí ( (Royal Spanish Football Federation) Barcelona)

=== Young player of the season ===
- (Haiti) Melchie Dumornay ( (French Football Federation) Lyon)

== See also ==
- 2023–24 UEFA Champions League
