= Alison Smyth (footballer) =

Northern Irish footballer (born 1989)

Personal information
- Date of birth: 1989 (age 36–37)
- Place of birth: Northern Ireland
- Positions: Forward; full-back

Team information
- Current team: Linfield
- Number: 10

Senior career*
Years	Team	Apps	(Gls)
2015–2018	Linfield	0	(0)
2020–	Linfield	0	(0)

International career^{‡}
- Northern Ireland
- * Club domestic league appearances and goals as of 19:56, 29 August 2019 (UTC) ‡ National team caps and goals as of 19:56, 29 August 2019 (UTC)

Alison Smyth (born 1989) is a Northern Irish footballer who plays as a defender and has appeared for the Northern Ireland women's national team.

== Career ==
Smyth has been capped for the Northern Ireland national team, appearing for the team during the 2019 FIFA Women's World Cup qualifying cycle.

In July 2018 Smyth suffered a double leg break and meniscus injury. She was able to return to football 26 months after the injury when she played for Linfield against Glentoran in September 2020.
