= NIFL Women's Premiership League Cup =

Women's football cup competition in Northern Ireland

- Founded: 2018
- Region: Northern Ireland
- Teams: 8
- Current champions: Cliftonville (4th title)
- Most championships: Cliftonville (4 titles)
- Broadcaster: DAZN
- Website: League Cup
- 2026 NIFL Women's Premiership League Cup

The NIFL Women's Premiership League Cup is the annual cup competition of women's football teams in Northern Ireland. Currently branded as BOYLE Sports Womens Cup due to sponsorship. It was first contested in 2018.

== Format ==
The participating teams consist of all teams in the Women's Premiership.

== Sponsors ==
Year/s	Sponsor
2018 - 2024	No Sponsor
2025	Vbet
2026 -	BOYLE Sports

== List of finals ==
Season	Champion	Result	Runner-up
2018	Linfield	4–1	Cliftonville
2019	Glentoran	2–0	Sion Swifts
2020	Cancelled due to COVID-19 pandemic		
2021	Cancelled due to COVID-19 pandemic		
2022	Sion Swifts	2–0	Cliftonville
2023	Cliftonville	3–1	Sion Swifts
2024	Cliftonville	2–0	Lisburn Rangers
2025	Cliftonville	4–2	Glentoran
2026	Cliftonville	4–0	Glentoran

== Performance by club ==
Club	Winners	Runners-up	Winning years	Runners-up years
Cliftonville	4	2	2023, 2024, 2025, 2026	2018, 2022
Sion Swifts	1	2	2022	2019, 2023
Glentoran	1	2	2019	2025, 2026
Linfield	1	0	2018	—
Lisburn Rangers	0	1	—	2024
