= Caitlin McGuinness =

Northern Irish footballer

Personal information
- Date of birth: 30 August 2002 (age 24)
- Place of birth: Northern Ireland,
- Height: 1.68 m (5 ft 6 in)
- Position: Centre forward

Team information
- Current team: Cliftonville
- Number: 9

Youth career
- Linfield

Senior career*
Years	Team	Apps	(Gls)
2018–2020	Linfield	17	(17)
2020–2021	Sion Swifts	9	(4)
2021–	Cliftonville Ladies	77	(87)

International career
2018–2019	Northern Ireland U17	6	(3)
2019–	Northern Ireland U18	1	(0)
2019–	Northern Ireland U19	3	(1)
2019–	Northern Ireland	16	(1)
- * Club domestic league appearances and goals

Caitlin McGuinness (born 30 August 2002) is a professional Northern Irish association footballer who plays as a centre forward for Women's Premiership club Sion Swifts and the Northern Ireland women's national team.

== Career ==
In August 2020 Sion Swifts announced the double signing of Caitlin McGuinness and her elder sister Kirsty McGuinness, both from league champions Linfield.

== Career statistics ==
Club	Season	Division	League		Cup		Continental		Total	
Club	Season	Division	Apps	Goals	Apps	Goals	Apps	Goals	Apps	Goals
Linfield	2019	Women's Premiership	17	17			3	0	20	17
Sion Swifts	2020	Women's Premiership	9	4					9	4
Clintonville	2021	Women's Premiership	7	11					7	11
Clintonville	2022	Women's Premiership	18	20					18	20
Clintonville	2023	Women's Premiership	18	17	3	4	7	2	28	26
Clintonville	2024	Women's Premiership	13	14	6	7	3	1	22	22
Clintonville	2025	Women's Premiership	15	7	8	12	5	2	28	21
Clintonville	2026	Women's Premiership	16	18	5	5	2	1	23	24
Clintonville	Total		77	87	22	28	17	6	116	121
Total career			103	108	22	28	20	6	145	142

== International career ==
McGuinness was part of the squad that was called up to the UEFA Women's Euro 2022.
