= Felicia Rogic =

Association football player

Personal information
- Full name: Felicia Anna Rogic Karlsson
- Date of birth: 23 September 1993 (age 33)
- Place of birth: Eskilstuna, Sweden
- Height: 1.69 m (5 ft 7 in)
- Position: Forward

Team information
- Current team: Eskilstuna United

Senior career*
Years	Team	Apps	(Gls)
2008–2010	Eskilstuna United		
2011–2012	LdB FC Malmö		
2011	→ Eskilstuna United (loan)	17	(5)
2012–2015	Eskilstuna United	82	(29)
2016–2017	Piteå IF	44	(1)
2018–2022	Eskilstuna United	105	(38)
2023–2024	Vålerenga	24	(4)
2025–	Eskilstuna United	0	(0)
- * Club domestic league appearances and goals as of 1 January 2025

Felicia Rogic (née Karlsson; born 23 September 1993) is a Swedish football forward currently playing for Eskilstuna United DFF.

She is married to fellow footballer Filip Rogic.
