= FC Kryvbas Kryvyi Rih (women) =

Kryvbas Kryvyi Rih
- Full name: FC Kryvbas Kryvyi Rih
- Founded: 2 July 2021
- Ground: Hirnyk Stadium, Kryvyi Rih
- Vice-President: Artem Haharin
- Manager: Kostyantyn Frolov (interim)
- League: Ukrainian Women's League
- 2024–25: 7th
- Website: https://fckryvbas.com/

Kryvbas Kryvyi Rih is a Ukrainian women's football team from Kryvyi Rih, part of FC Kryvbas Kryvyi Rih. On May 17, 2023, Kryvbas earned place to represent Ukraine in continental competitions for the first time.

== History ==
Founded on 2 July 2021 as part of the recently revived FC Kryvbas Kryvyi Rih, the first women team was originally based on another women football club from Mykolaiv, Nika which struggled financially. In July 2021 both Nika and Kryvbas signed a partnership agreement for cooperation, according to which Kryvbas received the Nika's place in the top tier and Nika had to start from the bottom.

== Titles ==
- Ukrainian League
  - Runners-up (1): 2022–23
- Ukrainian Cup

== European History ==
In European competitions, the club debuted in 2023 with a game against French Paris FC.

Season	Competition	Stage	Result	Opponent
2023–24	UEFA Women's Champions League	Qualifying Round 1	0–4 (neutral)	(France) Paris FC
2023–24	UEFA Women's Champions League	Qualifying Round 1	0–3 (away)	(Sweden) Linköping
