= Cliftonville Ladies F.C. =

Women's football club from Belfast, Northern Ireland

Cliftonville Ladies
- Full name: Cliftonville Ladies
- Ground: Solitude, Belfast
- Capacity: 8,000 (3,000 seated)
- Manager: Martin Douglas
- Coach: John McGrady
- League: Women's Premiership
- 2025: 2nd
- Website: https://cliftonvillefc.net/ladies-squad/
Home colours	Away colours

Cliftonville Ladies Football Club is a women's association football club from Belfast, Northern Ireland. The club is the women's team of Cliftonville, and plays in the Women's Premiership, the top tier women's football league of Irish League.

Cliftonville have won their first Irish League Women's Premiership title in 2022, and made their debut in the UEFA Women's Champions League in the 2023–24 season.

== History ==
=== Background ===
On 18 June 1895 Cliftonville's home ground, Solitude, hosted a match between two sides formed by British Ladies' Football Club players, a game that has since been recognized as the first women's association football match to take place in Ireland; four days later, on June 22, the British Ladies' played their second match in Belfast, taking on a local male selection. Both games were considered a success, and were credited to have helped future developments of women's football both in the Republic of Ireland and Northern Ireland.

=== 2003–2022: From Cliftonville Girls to Cliftonville Ladies ===
Cliftonville Ladies initially played as Cliftonville Girls in the regional Greater Belfast League, before joining the Women's Premier League, the top tier of Northern Irish women's football, in 2004. Following their rebranding as Cliftonville Ladies, the club became founding members of the Women's Premiership in 2016, as a result of the Northern Ireland Football League's decision to take over the running of the WPL.

In August 2019, Cliftonville player Billie Simpson was nominated for the 2019 FIFA Puskás Award for a goal she scored in a league match against Sion Swifts: in the process, she became the second Northern Irish player to ever receive a nomination for the prize, following Matty Burrows in 2011, and the third all-Ireland player to do so, if Stephanie Roche is included in the count.

In June 2022, six Cliftonville players, including national team captain Marissa Callaghan, were called up to the 23-women Northern Irish senior squad that took part in the UEFA Women's Euro 2022.

=== 2022–: First national title and professional status ===
On 26 October that year, the club won their first ever national title, having won 15 of their 16 league matches throughout the season, under head coach John McGrady. As a result, they qualified for the UEFA Women's Champions League for the first time in their history.

On 1 March 2023 Cliftonville became the first women's football team in the Irish League to announce professional contracts for their players since their introduction in December 2022, having officially tied down twelve footballers. However, they did not become the first club to register a professional player in Northern Ireland women's football, with Sion Swifts Ladies' Siobhan Higgins being the first player on a full-time contract to be registered on the Irish FA’s Comet system, instead.

In June 2023, Cliftonville were one of the five football teams from the Irish League that took part in the inaugural edition of the All-Island Cup, where they reached the final, before finishing as runners-up following a defeat to Galway United. During the same campaign, the club won their first Women’s County Antrim Cup in eight years, while also lifting the Women’s Premiership League Cup.

In September 2023, Cliftonville made their debut in the UEFA Women's Champions League against Benfica in the first qualifying round. On 6 September they suffered an 8–1 away defeat to the Portuguese side: however, Caitlin McGuinness scored the club's first goal ever in a European competition in the process.

== Players ==
=== Current squad ===
As of August 2026

Note: Flags indicate national team as defined under FIFA eligibility rules; some limited exceptions apply. Players may hold more than one non-FIFA nationality.

No.	Pos.	Nation	Player
1	GK	NIR	Emma Higgins
2	DF	NIR	Toni Leigh Finnegan
4	DF	NIR	Hannah Doherty
6	MF	IRL	Teegán Lynch
8	MF	NIR	Louise McDaniel
9	FW	NIR	Caitlin McGuinness
10	MF	NIR	Vicky Carleton
11	FW	NIR	Kirsty McGuinness
13	MF	NIR	Aoibhe O'Neill
18	MF	NIR	Charlotte Havern

No.	Pos.	Nation	Player
20	DF	NIR	Orleigha McGuinness
23	DF	NIR	Aisling Anderson
24	GK	NIR	Beth Peoples
25	FW	NIR	Lydia Thompson
26	MF	NIR	Charley McMullan
28	FW	NIR	Eimear Ward
33	DF	NIR	Abbie Magee
38	FW	NIR	Abi Curley
44	GK	NIR	Maddy Harvey-Clifford
77	FW	NIR	Lucy Kelly

== European record ==
=== UEFA Women's Champions League ===
- 2023–24: Round 1
- 2027–28: TBD

== Honours ==
=== Senior ===
- Women's Premiership

Champions (3): 2022, 2024, 2026
Runners-up (4): 2016, 2021, 2023, 2025

- IFA Women's Challenge Cup

Winners (3): 2015 2024, 2025

- NIFL Women's Premiership League Cup

Winners (4): 2023, 2024, 2025, 2026

- Women's County Antrim Cup

Winners (2): 2015, 2023

- All-Island Cup

Runners-up (1): 2023

== Youth sector ==
The youth sector of Cliftonville Ladies includes several ranks, with teams competing at under-9, under-11, under-13, under-15, under-17 and under-19 level. The club's under-19 team, Cliftonville Corinthians, plays in the Electric Ireland Women's Academy League, formed and hosted by the Northern Ireland Football League, since its foundation in 2019.

== See also ==
- Cliftonville F.C.
