= Ballymena United Women F.C. =

Women's football club

Ballymena United Women
- Full name: Ballymena United Women Football Club
- Founded: 1994 (as Allstars F.C.)
- Ground: Ballymena Showgrounds, Ballymena, County Antrim
- Capacity: 4,390
- Manager: William Devine
- League: Women's Premiership (Northern Ireland)
- 2022: 2th (promoted)
Home colours	Away colours

Ballymena United Women Football Club is a women's association football club based in Ballymena, County Antrim, Northern Ireland. They were founded in 1994 as Allstars F.C. before amalgamating with Ballymena United F.C. to become their women's team in 2003. The club currently plays in the Women's Premiership (Northern Ireland) and play their home matches at Ballymena Showgrounds

== History ==
Allstars F.C. were founded in 1994 by Kelly Barr. When they were founded, they had no permanent home ground and lived a nomadic existence. They started a rivalry in Belfast with fellow women's team Probation F.C. In 2003, Allstars joined up with Ballymena United men's team to become their official women's team. This coincided with an unbeaten start to their Women's Premier League campaign. Ballymena United Allstars in the end failed to win the league, finishing fourth behind Glentoran Belfast United L.F.C. Owing to renovations, they were unable to use Ballymena Showgrounds for a number of home matches and were only being offered a "disgraceful and embarrassing" pitch in a local park as a replacement.

In the following years, Ballymena United Allstars often finished in mid-table in the Women's Premier League. In 2005, they reached the semi-finals of the IFA Women's Challenge Cup but lost 2–0 to Northland Raiders F.C. In 2012, they made the final of the Premier League Cup however they lost 2–0 to Glentoran Belfast United. In 2014, they finished 3rd last above Shankill United Predators F.C., just avoiding the promotion/relegation playoff. In 2015, the club finished last in the Women's Premier League with only 2 draws and were relegated to the Women's Championship.
