= Mid-Ulster Ladies F.C. =

Coordinates: 54°37′0.4″N 6°44′12.3″W

Mid-Ulster Ladies
- Full name: Mid-Ulster Ladies Football Club
- Short name: Mid-Ulster Ladies
- Founded: 2000
- Ground: Mid Ulster Sports Arena, Cookstown
- League: Women's Premiership
- 2024: 9th (of 9)
- Website: http://www.midulsterlfc.com/

Mid-Ulster Ladies Football Club is a women's association football club based in Cookstown, County Tyrone, Northern Ireland. The club was founded in 2000 and currently plays in the Women's Premiership and at the Mid Ulster Sports Arena.

== History ==
Mid-Ulster Ladies F.C. came about after a number of players were moving away from Cookstown to nearby Dungannon Athletic Ladies to play football despite Dungannon Athletic using Cookstown for training. Future Northern Ireland Women's Football Association chairwoman Elaine Junk, who was playing for Dungannon Athletic in 2000 decided to found Mid-Ulster Ladies F.C. as a way for Cookstown ladies to play football locally in their hometown. By 2002, they had made their way up to NIWFA Division 2. Following a reorganisation of women's football in Northern Ireland, in 2004 Mid-Ulster Ladies were placed into the Mid Ulster League. In 2005, they were promoted into the national League below the Women's Premier League.

In 2008, Mid-Ulster Ladies were promoted into the Women's Premier League. In 2013 Mid-Ulster Ladies finished in the promotion-relegation playoff place, where they would compete against NIWFA Division 2 runner-up Cliftonville Ladies however they managed to win and retain their Women's Premier League status before making the final of the Premier Cup, where they were defeated 2-0 by Glentoran Belfast United. In 2015 they also took part in the promotion-relegation playoff against Lisburn Distillery Ladies. Mid-Ulster Ladies retained their Women's Premier League place again by winning 8-3 on aggregate.
