= The Bluebell Stadium =

Northern Irish sports stadium

Coordinates: 54°30′57″N 6°4′32″W

- Interactive map of The Bluebell Stadium
- Full name: The Bluebell Stadium
- Location: Lisburn, Northern Ireland
- Owner: Ballymacash Rangers F.C.
- Capacity: 1280
- Surface: Artificial

Construction
- Built: 1984 (Renovated 2020)

Tenants
- Ballymacash Rangers F.C. Lisburn Ladies FC

Website
- www.ballymacashsportsacademy.org

The Bluebell Stadium is a football stadium in Lisburn, County Antrim, Northern Ireland. It is the home stadium of local football team Ballymacash Rangers F.C.

== Renovation ==
The new ground was a grass venue from 1984 until July 2020, when a new artificial surface was installed as part of a ground renovation.

== Notable matches ==
The ground played host to the first ever Northern Ireland Football League Women's Premiership game in the city of Lisburn, Northern Ireland. The fixture took place between Lisburn Ladies and Sion Swifts Ladies F.C. on Wednesday 25 April 2022 in front of 106 people.

== Use by other teams ==
The Bluebell Stadium is also used by Lisburn Ladies FC who played in the Northern Ireland Football League, Women's Premiership.
