= Lisburn Ladies F.C. =

Women's football club

Lisburn Ladies
- Full name: Lisburn Ladies
- Founded: 2010
- Ground: Bluebell Stadium
- Capacity: 1280
- League: Women's Premiership
- 2025: 7th
- Website: https://www.facebook.com/lisburnladiesfb/
Home colours	Away colours

Lisburn Ladies Football Club is a women's football club from Lisburn, Northern Ireland. They currently play in the Women's Premiership, 2022 being their first season in the top flight.

== History ==
Formed as recently as 2010, Lisburn Ladies made their debut in the NIWFA Championship five years later and went on to finish runners-up on numerous occasions before, in 2021, finally clinching the title with an unbeaten season and with it promotion to the Premiership. The club has an extensive underage and academy programme, their second team Lisburn Ladies Swift's currently play in the Division 3 of the NIWFA league structure as of 2023.

== Titles ==
- NIWFA Championship

Winners: 2021
