= Ryan McBride Brandywell Stadium =

Football stadium in Derry, Northern Ireland

The Ryan McBride Brandywell Stadium
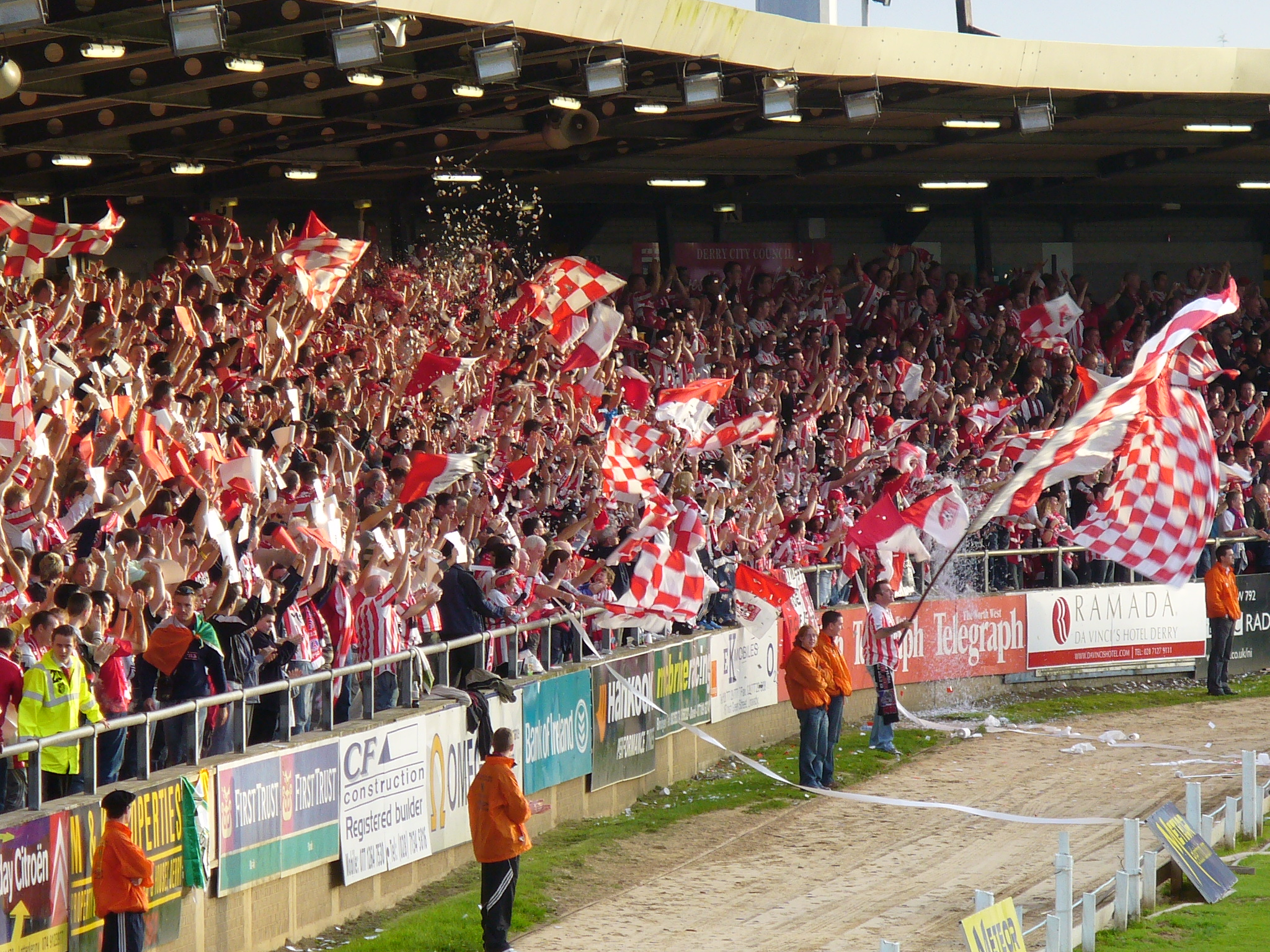

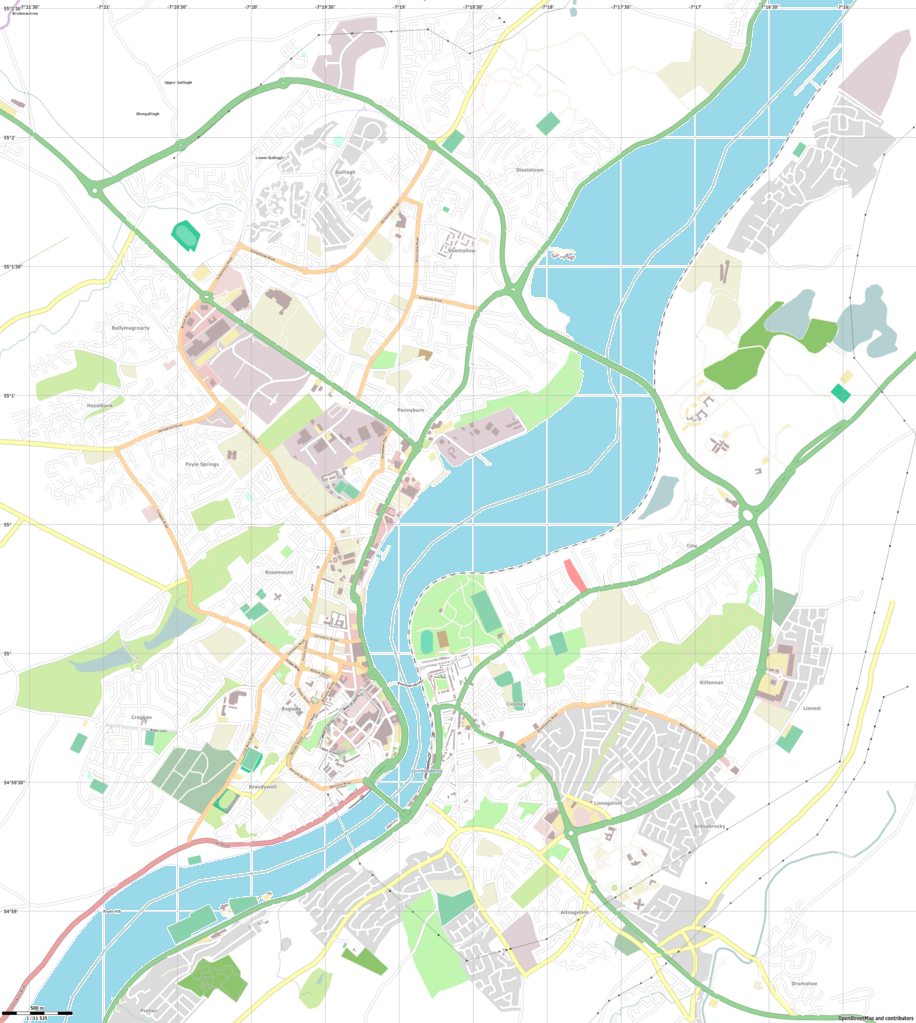
- Location within Derry
- Location: Lone Moor Road; Derry; Northern Ireland
- Coordinates: 54°59′26″N 7°20′10″W
- Owner: Derry City and Strabane District Council
- Capacity: 6,300
- Surface: Hybrid grass

Construction
- Opened: 1928

Tenants
- Derry City (1928–present); Institute F.C. (2018–present); Greyhound racing (1932–2016)

The Ryan McBride Brandywell Stadium (Irish: Tobar an Fhíoruisce^{1}) is a municipal football stadium in Derry, Northern Ireland. It is the home ground of League of Ireland team Derry City, Women’s Premiership team Sion Swifts Ladies, NIWFA Championship Ladies Team Foyle Belles FC and (temporarily) NIFL Championship team Institute.

Until September 2018, the stadium was known as the Brandywell Stadium before it was renamed to honour Ryan McBride.

== Football ==
=== Location, features and history ===
The stadium is situated on the Lone Moor Road just south-west of the Bogside in the Brandywell area and shares the road with another sports-ground, Celtic Park, the headquarters of the Derry GAA. The ground, which is within walking distance of the city centre, is more commonly referred to as 'the Brandywell', and is the home of Derry City FC.

Previously it was the home of St Columb's Court and Derry Celtic. The ground, as well as the stadium, features a large grass training area, a club shop, a club house, from which the club and ticket offices operate, and parking space for cars and coaches. The legal owner of the stadium is the Derry City Council, however, which, under licence, permits Derry City to make use of the grounds for training matches and the running of its various other club affairs, such as administration and the retail outlet.

Plans of Derry City's to purchase a pitch fell through after their formation due to the tight timescale between their birth in 1928 and the season's beginning in 1929 and so the Londonderry Corporation (now known as the Derry City Council) was approached for the use of the Brandywell Stadium which had been used for football up until the end of the 19th century. This began an association between the club and the ground which has survived until the present day. The club are still operating under the constraints of the Honourable the Irish Society charter limitations which declare that the Brandywell must be available for the recreation of the community. In effect, the club do not have private ownership over the ground and, thus, cannot develop it by their own accord with that discretion being left to the Derry City Council.

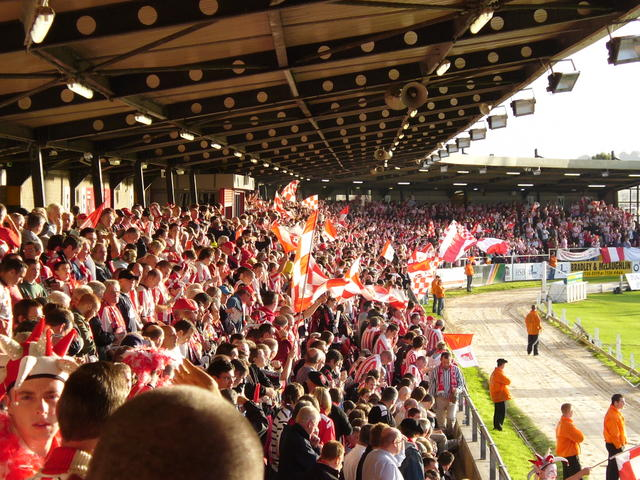
The Brandywell's Southend Park Stand on match-day.

Derry City's first game at the Brandywell was against Glentoran on 22 August 1929. The stadium has played host to many notable matches, such as Derry City's 1–0 victory IFK Göteborg on 27 July 2006 in the UEFA Cup first qualifying round. However, current facilities for spectators and media simply cannot cope with the demand for some matches. The ground also hosted the FAI League Cup final in 2006 between Derry City and Dublin rivals, Shelbourne FC. Derry won the dramatic game after it went to a penalty shoot-out.

The dimensions of the pitch itself measure 111 yards in length by 72 yards in width. Due to health and safety regulations the stadium has a seating capacity of 2,900 for European football competitions run by UEFA, although it can accommodate 8,200 on a normal domestic match-day including those both standing and seated.

For a period of 14 years, between 1971 and 1985, only greyhound meetings and junior football were held at the venue as both the police and the Irish League imposed a ban on Derry City using the stadium as their home ground due to the Troubles. Derry City used the Coleraine Showgrounds instead for a number of 'home' ties in the 1971–72 season. While the police ruled the Brandywell was safe to use for the 1972–73 season, a league vote to allow Derry to return to the ground failed by one vote. A number of opposing teams, especially those with unionist support, were reluctant to travel through the area surrounding the stadium due to the Troubles. Faced with an unsustainable arrangement and dwindling finances, Derry left the Irish League entirely in October 1972 due to the unsustainability of such an arrangement. 1985 saw Derry admitted into the Republic's league, the League of Ireland, and a much-welcomed return of senior football to the ground.

Unusually, the Brandywell does not usually have a police presence inside it during Derry City games; however, the PSNI do have the ability to enter the stadium in an emergency.

The Brandywell Stadium also hosts the final games of the Foyle Cup tournament.

In 2002, the stadium was voted the tenth favourite sporting venue in the UK by BBC Radio 5 Live.

=== Development; past, present and planned ===
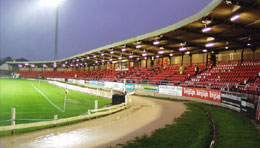
The Brandywell's 'New Stand' under floodlights

The Brandywell has undergone large-scale redevelopment in recent years with the installation of new state of the art floodlights in January 1990 being marked by a win over Leicester City . The curved cantilever 'New Stand', later known as the Southend Park stand or simply the Southend Stand, was constructed in 1991 and the terraced 'Jungle' was demolished in 2004. The 'Jungle' section was the home of Derry's noisier hardcore element of fans. Many of these fanatics now occupy the area of and surrounding Block J in the 'New Stand'. The quieter blocks of the 'New Stand', where the remainder of the more-reserved spectators sit, are sometimes referred to as the 'Library' in jest by the louder group.

Furthermore, the stadium saw the construction of 450 extra seats opposite the 'New Stand' on the site of the old 'Jungle' to complement the pre-existing small Glentoran Stand (the old main stand; an elevated wooden structure with bench seating) on that side of the ground, as well as the development of a drug-testing facility, in August 2006 in order to cope with the demand for Derry's UEFA Cup second qualifying round tie with Gretna FC. Although the remainder of available space around the pitch and racing track is used as a terrace, development is set to continue with the building of the proposed Brandywell Complex. On behalf of the club, Brandywell Properties' plans for the complex include an 8,000 all-seater stadium (which will be expandable), new playing and training pitches, an indoor football complex, retail units, a medical centre and a pharmacy. There are, however, no plans under the current proposals, to include a dog-racing track. The cost of this development, which is aimed to be completed by 2012, is reportedly £12 million. Work on the new complex was planned to begin by Spring 2007. The need for new stadium facilities became prominent with the old side of the stadium becoming noticeably more run-down by the season. However, as legal owners of the land, Derry City Council ultimately holds the key to the proceeding of any planned development.

While an alternative idea of building a new multi-purpose stadium for the city (which would also provide a new home for Derry City FC) on the site of a dismantled British Army post at the city's Fort George, or even a move to a re-developed Templemore Sports Complex, has also been aired due to delays in the process, on 12 January 2007, financial advisor and former Gaelic Athletic Association president, Peter Quinn, who played a pivotal role in securing funding for the re-development of the modern-day Croke Park, was appointed as a consultant by Brandywell Properties to spearhead the club's bid to take over the re-development of the Brandywell Stadium and help the plan progress. On behalf of Brandywell Properties he is to seek funding from both the Irish and British governments, as well as injections from the National Lottery along with sums from other sporting agencies in order to help raise the £12 million needed. The proposals will eventually be submitted to the Government, as well to the city council.

On 19 February 2007, the chairman of Brandywell Properties, Jack McCauley, a former chairman of Derry City, re-iterated the intention of focusing on the Brandywell Stadium for re-development and made it clear that the club's traditional and spiritual home at the Brandywell was "the only show in town" as far as the football club was concerned. He also expressed how he was "amazed and surprised" that options such as the Templemore Sports Complex and Fort George were actually talked of being available.

Details of a state-of-the-art stand on the Lone Moor Road side of the ground were announced in October 2009. Then Derry City chairman Pat McDaid said he hoped the work would be completed by 2012. The need for repair was highlighted by the club's return to European competition that year.

In 2010, Ostick + Williams was appointed by Derry City Council to carry out redevelopment of the stadium to bring it into line with modern safety standards. Included in their brief was compliance with UEFA Category 2 and 3 standard to allow for European games to be played there. The development included a new 2,600-seat stand (the North Stand), which brought the seating capacity up to 5,100, as well as new facilities for players, media, and spectators. An Artificial turf will be laid, and the greyhound racing facilities will also be updated. The track and football pitch will be at separate locations within the showgrounds. Spectator access to the ground will be improved, segregation will be possible for crowd control when necessary, and there will also be the ability to stage concerts and other events at the stadium. A sports centre at Brandywell will be demolished as part of the redevelopment plan.

It was initially hoped that work would commence in 2011. The stated cost of work was £5 million. Funding was expected to come from Stormont, as a deal agreed between Linfield and the Irish Football Association for them to use Windsor Park for national team matches freed up funds. The urgency of funding was exacerbated by essential safety works. A share of £31 million was made available. Concerns that the club doesn't play in the Northern Ireland Football League and should not have access to government funding were dismissed by Derry City chairman Philip O'Doherty. He said the club pays tax and should be entitled to the same facilities as any Belfast club.

Derry City Council, owners of the stadium, agreed in principle in December 2013 to spend £2.7 million on its redevelopment. In 2015, Mr O'Doherty blamed a council consultation project for the delay in redevelopment, which had already seen part of the Glentoran stand torn down. That stand was one of the oldest structures in the Irish Football League, and originally stood at the Oval football ground in Belfast, hence its name. The stadium was purchased, disassembled, and reconstructed at Brandywell in the 1940s. Work was delayed by a further year, potentially scuppering plans to have Celtic F.C. formally open the new stadium.

In January 2016, the club announced the new stadium would be built ready for the 2017 season, and that work would start in July. In February 2016, a proposal was made to name the stand after former striker Mark Farren. On 5 July 2016, Derry City and Strabane District Council advised they were in the final stages of a procurement process for the Brandywell stadium. Two months later, the final stages were still in progress.

After a 2–1 victory over Bohemians, Derry City qualified for the 2017–18 Europa League. However, as the 2016 domestic league season came to a close, club chairman Philip O'Doherty said that European football at Brandywell was under threat, due to the uncertainty over a start date for the stadium's redevelopment. On 19 October, Derry City and Strabane District Council stated the appointment of a contractor was ongoing. Work finally commenced in December 2016 on the new 3G pitch and all-seated stand, which was completed in time for the start of the 2018 season. All home games in 2017 were played at Maginn Park.

As part of a £7million redevelopment, work on a new stand, named after former player Mark Farren, began in 2016 with phase one completed in February 2018.

==== 2020s ====
On 25 May 2023, Derry City announced that they had submitted a planning application to build a new covered stand at the Brandywell Road end of the ground, which would increase the capacity by 2,940. Construction would also include male and female toilets, gates and two sets of turnstiles with partial demolition of the Southend Stand also required. The £2million North Stand was officially opened on 4 April 2025.

In March 2025, the council offered Derry City a minimum 25-year lease on the stadium to allow the club to avail of grant funding from Stormont via the Northern Ireland Football Fund. This grant was required to complete the second phase of development on the Mark Farren Stand. The lease was approved unanimously by the city council with cross party support. However, Section 273 of the Londonderry Corporation Act 1918, restricted the council's ability "to let the stadium for a period of more than 12 months". This required the Northern Ireland Executive to amend or repeal the law before Derry City could enter into a long-term lease on the stadium.

Completion of the Mark Farren stand and proposed North Terrace stand would increase the capacity of the stadium from 3,689 to 7,408. Beyond the stands, the city council hopes to develop three new training pitches, including one domed structure south of the stadium and a development area for the fan experience north of the stadium.

In June 2026, work was completed on a grass-hybrid pitch — funded by the club — that replaced the stadium's previous artificial turf surface.

=== The stadium in song ===
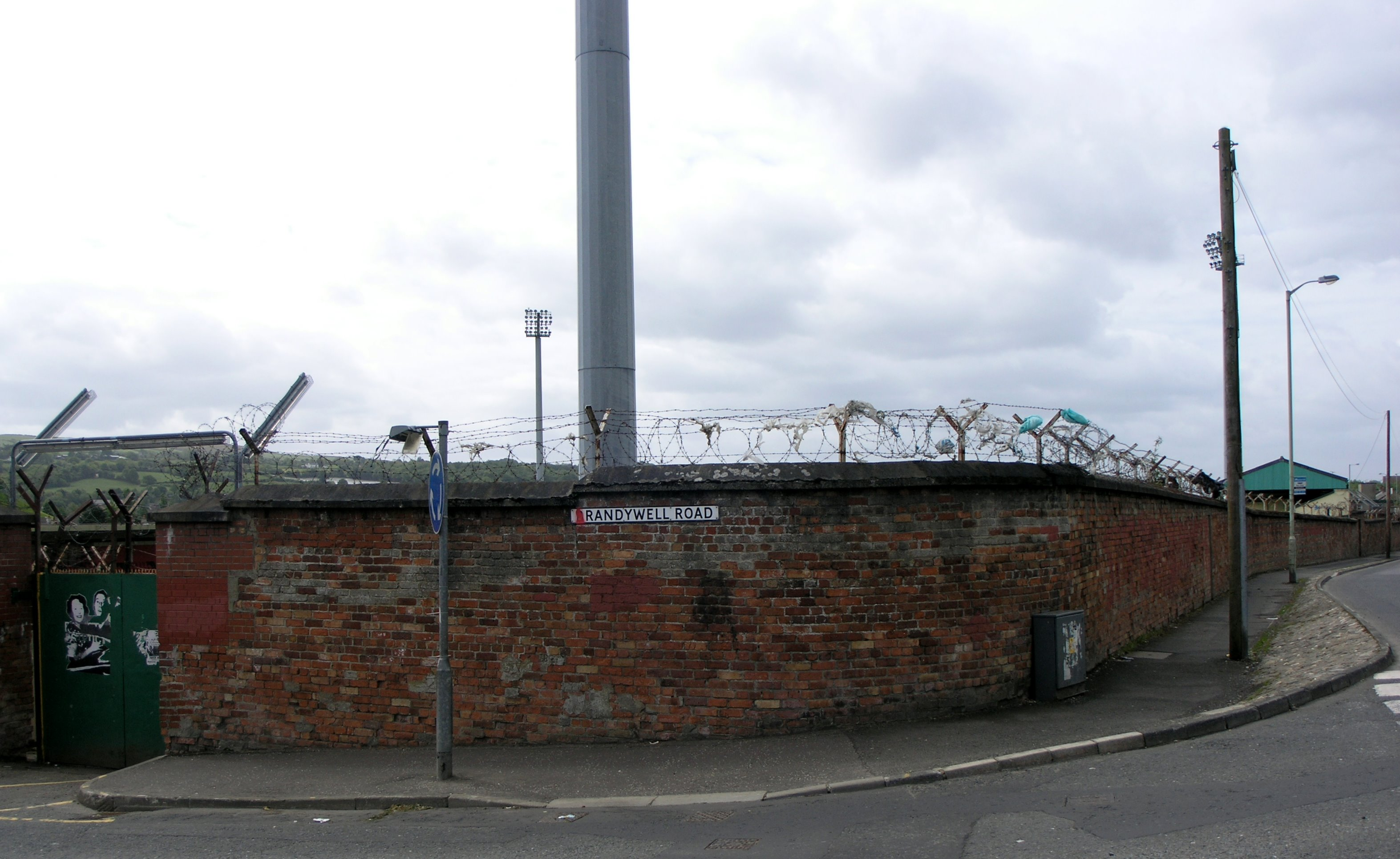
Road sign outside the stadium, changed to "Randywell road".

During games, Derry City's fans can often be heard singing:

We all live in the randy Brandywell,
The randy Brandywell,
The randy Brandywell.
-To the tune of the Beatles' Yellow Submarine.

== Greyhound Racing ==
The original track around the stadium existed from 1932 to 2016. In 2018, a new stand-alone track was opened.

== Records ==
- Record League of Ireland attendance: 9,800 (Derry City-Finn Harps, FAI Cup Second Round, 23 February 1986)
- Highest TV audience for a League of Ireland match: Peak >400,000 (Derry City-Shelbourne, League of Ireland Premier Division 1 November 2024)

== Footnotes ==
^1"Tobar an Fhíoruisce" translates literally into English as "the well of pure water".
