= Derry City F.C. Women =

Derry City Women
- Full name: Derry City Football Club Women
- Short name: Derry City Women
- Founded: 2002
- Ground: Brandywell Stadium; Derry, Northern Ireland
- Capacity: 7,700
- Manager: Paul Dixon
- League: Women's Premiership
- 2025: 6th (of 8)
- Website: http://www.derrycityfc.net/derry-city-ladies/

Derry City Football Club Women is the women's association football department of Derry City, in Derry, Northern Ireland. It was founded in 2002 by Declan Devine and in 2007 affiliated to the Northern Ireland Women's Football Association; since 2015 it has played in the Women's Premiership. Its home matches have been played at various grounds, recently including the Brandywell Stadium used by the men's senior team.

== History ==
To coincide with the men's team's 75th anniversary, Derry City Ladies were formed and played their first match at the men's team's Brandywell Stadium against Donegal Celtic F.C. which resulted in a 3–3 draw. Despite the men's team being affiliated with the Republic of Ireland's Football Association of Ireland and play in the Republic of Ireland's league system, the ladies team are affiliated with the Irish Football Association's Northern Ireland Women's Football Association and play in the Northern Irish leagues. They initially started playing league football in the Republic of Ireland's Inishowen Football League but later moved into the Northern Irish league system in 2007.

In 2015, they won the NIWFA Championship and were promoted into the Women's Premiership for the first time. They also won the Foyle Cup, Ballymena Sevens, NIWFA Championship League Cup. Despite this, they had no official home ground. They asked Derry and Strabane District Council for permission to play at the Brandywell Stadium. However consent was not granted and no permanent address was published in the league's handbook, so they played their matches at Riverside Stadium in Drumahoe. The club finished bottom of the league in their debut season and were relegated back to the NIWFA Championship for 2017. However they won promotion back to the Women's Premier League the following season.

== Titles ==
- Women's Championship: 2015, 2017
