= Sion Swifts Ladies F.C. =

Coordinates: 54°49′22.0″N 7°27′45.2″W

- Full name: Sion Swifts Ladies Football Club
- Founded: 2010; 16 years ago
- Ground: Melvin Sports Complex, Strabane
- Manager: Tony McGinley
- League: Women's Premiership
- 2023: 4th
Home colours

Sion Swifts Ladies Football Club is a women's association football club based in Strabane, County Tyrone, Ireland. They were founded in 2010 and promoted into the Irish League Women’s Premiership in 2015. They won the IFA Women's Challenge Cup in 2017, beating Newry City 2–0 at Windsor Park in Belfast.

Throughout its history the club has fielded a number of players from nearby County Donegal in the Ireland. In June 2019 the club was subject to media attention when their goalkeeper Nicole McClure played for Jamaica at the 2019 FIFA Women's World Cup in France, then played in a league match for Sion Swifts the following day.

The club lost a close battle with rivals Linfield for the 2019 Women's Premiership title in 2019. In August 2020 they announced the double signing of Linfield captain Kirsty McGuinness and her sister Caitlin McGuinness.

== Honours ==
- IFA Women's Challenge Cup: 2017
- NIFL Women's Premiership League Cup: 2022
