= Linfield F.C. Women =

Coordinates: 54°34′59.5″N 5°57′30.5″W

Linfield Women
- Ground: Midgley Park
- Manager: Ryan McConville
- League: Women's Premiership
- 2025: 3rd
- Website: linfieldfc.com/teams/womens
Home colours	Away colours

Linfield Football Club is a women's football club from Belfast, Northern Ireland and a subsidiary of Linfield Football Club.

Linfield have won the Irish League’s Women's Premiership four times from 2016 to 2019. They played in the UEFA Women's Champions League qualifying stage four times. Linfield have also won the national cup, the IFA Women's Challenge Cup in 2013, 2014 and 2016.

As of 2023, Linfield Ladies rebranded themselves as Linfield Football Club Women and will officially refer to their team as "Linfield". The club put out a statement; “Whilst the governing body and regional association require a method to demarcate our teams, we see it as an important step to remove the gender assignation. The players are Linfield players, regardless of gender. Therefore, our team playing in the Women’s Premiership will be referred to as Linfield”.

In a further step, the club responded to concerns of their players around the traditional use of white coloured shorts and the menstrual cycle. Similar to the example set by Manchester City, the club acknowledged how this can affect players. Linfield will now wear darker coloured shorts.

== Players ==
=== First team squad ===
As of 18 May 2023

Note: Flags indicate national team as defined under FIFA eligibility rules; some limited exceptions apply. Players may hold more than one non-FIFA nationality.

No.	Pos.	Nation	Player
1	GK	NIR	Lauren Currie
24	GK	NIR	Erin McAllister
—	DF	NIR	Sophie Gargan
5	DF	NIR	Ashley Hutton
21	DF	NIR	Zoe Knox
2	DF	NIR	Jane McMaster
4	DF	NIR	Abi Sweetlove
19	DF	NIR	Eilish Ward
20	MF	NIR	Megan Weatherall
18	MF	NIR	Rhianna Breen
17	MF	NIR	Carla Devine
6	MF	NIR	Mia Fitzsimmons
11	MF	NIR	Keri Halliday

No.	Pos.	Nation	Player
23	MF	NIR	Sofie Keenan
15	MF	NIR	Sienna Leckey
16	MF	NIR	Rhyleigh Marks
22	MF	NIR	Mia Moore
26	MF	NIR	Eva Myles
9	FW	NIR	Rebecca Bassett
—	FW	NIR	Lucy Johnston
18	FW	NIR	Rachel Kerr
14	FW	NIR	Ebony Leckey
12	FW	NIR	Rachel McConnell
23	FW	NIR	Emily Reid
10	FW	NIR	Alison Smyth

== Titles ==
- Women's Premiership

Winners (4): 2016, 2017, 2018, 2019

- IFA Women's Challenge Cup

Winners (3): 2013, 2014, 2016

- NIFL Women's Premiership League Cup

Winners (1): 2018

- Womens County Antrim Cup

Winners (4): 2013, 2014, 2015, 2016
