= UEFA Women's Euro 2022 knockout stage =

Football tournament

The knockout phase of UEFA Women's Euro 2022 began on 20 July 2022 and ended on 31 July 2022 with the final.

All times local (UTC+1).

== Format ==
In the knockout stage, extra time and a penalty shoot-out were used to decide the winner if necessary.

== Qualified teams ==
The top two placed teams from each of the four groups qualified for the knockout stage.

Group	Winners	Runners-up
A	England	Austria
B	Germany	Spain
C	Sweden	Netherlands
D	France	Belgium

== Bracket ==
Quarter-finals
20 July – Brighton and Hove
England (a.e.t.)	2
Spain	1
22 July – Leigh
Sweden	1
Belgium	0
21 July – London (BCS)
Germany	2
Austria	0
23 July – Rotherham
France (a.e.t.)	1
Netherlands	0

Semi-finals
26 July – Sheffield
England	4
Sweden	0
27 July – Milton Keynes
Germany	2
France	1

Final
31 July – London (WS)
England (a.e.t.)	2
Germany	1

== Quarter-finals ==
=== England vs Spain ===
20 July 2022
20:00

England	2–1 (a.e.t.)	Spain
Toone 84'; Stanway 96'	Report	González 54'

Falmer Stadium, Brighton and Hove
Attendance: 28,994
Referee: Stéphanie Frappart (France)

England	Spain

GK	1	Mary Earps
RB	2	Lucy Bronze
CB	6	Millie Bright
CB	8	Leah Williamson (c)
LB	3	Rachel Daly		(substituted off) 82'
CM	10	Georgia Stanway
CM	4	Keira Walsh		(substituted off) 116'
AM	14	Fran Kirby		(substituted off) 64'
RW	7	Beth Mead		(substituted off) 58'
LW	11	Lauren Hemp		(substituted off) 116'
CF	9	Ellen White		(substituted off) 58'
Substitutions:
FW	18	Chloe Kelly		(substituted in) 58'
FW	23	Alessia Russo		(substituted in) 58'
MF	20	Ella Toone		(substituted in) 64'
DF	5	Alex Greenwood	(yellow card) 119'	(substituted in) 82'
MF	16	Jill Scott		(substituted in) 116'
FW	17	Nikita Parris		(substituted in) 116'
Manager:
(Netherlands) Sarina Wiegman

GK	13	Sandra Paños
RB	2	Ona Batlle
CB	4	Irene Paredes (c)
CB	16	María Pilar León	(yellow card) 45'
LB	19	Olga Carmona
CM	6	Aitana Bonmatí
CM	12	Patricia Guijarro
CM	18	Teresa Abelleira		(substituted off) 71'
RF	11	Marta Cardona		(substituted off) 46'
CF	9	Esther González		(substituted off) 77'
LF	8	Mariona Caldentey		(substituted off) 100'
Substitutions:
FW	10	Athenea del Castillo		(substituted in) 46'
DF	3	Laia Aleixandri		(substituted in) 71'
MF	21	Sheila García		(substituted in) 77'
FW	14	Amaiur Sarriegi		(substituted in) 100'
Other disciplinary actions:
GK	23	Misa Rodríguez	(yellow card) 88'
Manager:
Jorge Vilda

Player of the Match:
Millie Bright (England)

Assistant referees:
Élodie Coppola (France)
Manuela Nicolosi (France)
Fourth official:
Lina Lehtovaara (Finland)
Video assistant referee:
Pol van Boekel (Netherlands)
Assistant video assistant referees:
Dennis Higler (Netherlands)
Benoît Millot (France)

=== Germany vs Austria ===
21 July 2022
20:00

Germany	2–0	Austria
Magull 25'; Popp 90'	Report

Brentford Community Stadium, London
Attendance: 16,025
Referee: Rebecca Welch (England)

Germany	Austria

GK	1	Merle Frohms
RB	15	Giulia Gwinn
CB	3	Kathrin Hendrich
CB	5	Marina Hegering
LB	17	Felicitas Rauch		(substituted off) 90+5'
CM	20	Lina Magull		(substituted off) 64'
CM	6	Lena Oberdorf
CM	13	Sara Däbritz	(yellow card) 59'	(substituted off) 64'
RF	9	Svenja Huth		(substituted off) 90+5'
CF	11	Alexandra Popp (c)
LF	19	Klara Bühl		(substituted off) 83'
Substitutions:
MF	16	Linda Dallmann		(substituted in) 64'
MF	4	Lena Lattwein		(substituted in) 64'
MF	22	Jule Brand		(substituted in) 83'
MF	8	Sydney Lohmann		(substituted in) 90+5'
DF	2	Sophia Kleinherne		(substituted in) 90+5'
Manager:
Martina Voss-Tecklenburg

GK	1	Manuela Zinsberger
RB	12	Laura Wienroither
CB	7	Carina Wenninger (c)
CB	2	Marina Georgieva
LB	19	Verena Hanshaw	(yellow card) 45'
DM	17	Sarah Puntigam		(substituted off) 81'
CM	9	Sarah Zadrazil
CM	10	Laura Feiersinger
RW	18	Julia Hickelsberger		(substituted off) 72'
LW	8	Barbara Dunst	(yellow card) 85'
CF	15	Nicole Billa		(substituted off) 86'
Substitutions:
DF	3	Katharina Naschenweng	(yellow card) 90+4'	(substituted in) 72'
MF	14	Marie Höbinger		(substituted in) 81'
FW	20	Lisa Makas		(substituted in) 86'
Manager:
Irene Fuhrmann

Player of the Match:
Klara Bühl (Germany)

Assistant referees:
Sian Massey-Ellis (England)
Lisa Rashid (England)
Fourth official:
Iuliana Demetrescu (Romania)
Video assistant referee:
Tomasz Kwiatkowski (Poland)
Assistant video assistant referees:
Bartosz Frankowski (Poland)
Guillermo Cuadra Fernández (Spain)

=== Sweden vs Belgium ===
22 July 2022
20:00

Sweden	1–0	Belgium
Sembrant 90+2'	Report

Leigh Sports Village, Leigh
Attendance: 7,517
Referee: Kateryna Monzul (Ukraine)

Sweden	Belgium

GK	1	Hedvig Lindahl
RB	13	Amanda Ilestedt
CB	3	Linda Sembrant
CB	6	Magdalena Eriksson
LB	5	Amanda Nildén
CM	16	Filippa Angeldahl	(substituted off) 84'
CM	9	Kosovare Asllani (c)
CM	14	Nathalie Björn
RF	19	Johanna Rytting Kaneryd
CF	11	Stina Blackstenius
LF	18	Fridolina Rolfö
Substitutions:
MF	20	Hanna Bennison	(substituted in) 84'
Manager:
Peter Gerhardsson

GK	1	Nicky Evrard
RB	22	Laura Deloose		(substituted off) 67'
CB	19	Sari Kees
CB	18	Laura De Neve
LB	2	Davina Philtjens	(yellow card) 36'
CM	20	Julie Biesmans	(yellow card) 16'	(substituted off) 88'
CM	10	Justine Vanhaevermaet
CM	16	Marie Minnaert
RF	11	Janice Cayman
CF	6	Tine De Caigny
LF	9	Tessa Wullaert (c)
Substitutions:
FW	13	Elena Dhont		(substituted in) 67'
MF	23	Kassandra Missipo		(substituted in) 88'
Manager:
Ives Serneels

Player of the Match:
Nicky Evrard (Belgium)

Assistant referees:
Maryna Striletska (Ukraine)
Paulina Baranowska (Poland)
Fourth official:
Emikar Calderas Barrera (Venezuela)
Video assistant referee:
Paolo Valeri (Italy)
Assistant video assistant referees:
Maurizio Mariani (Italy)
Harm Osmers (Germany)

=== France vs Netherlands ===
23 July 2022
20:00

France	1–0 (a.e.t.)	Netherlands
Périsset 102' (pen.)	Report

New York Stadium, Rotherham
Attendance: 9,764
Referee: Ivana Martinčić (Croatia)

France	Netherlands

GK	21	Pauline Peyraud-Magnin
RB	22	Ève Périsset	(substituted off) 106'
CB	19	Griedge Mbock Bathy
CB	3	Wendie Renard (c)
LB	7	Sakina Karchaoui
CM	8	Grace Geyoro	(substituted off) 87'
CM	14	Charlotte Bilbault
CM	6	Sandie Toletti	(substituted off) 106'
RF	11	Kadidiatou Diani	(substituted off) 106'
CF	12	Melvine Malard	(substituted off) 62'
LF	20	Delphine Cascarino
Substitutions:
DF	13	Selma Bacha	(substituted in) 62'
FW	10	Clara Matéo	(substituted in) 87'
MF	2	Ella Palis	(substituted in) 106'
DF	4	Marion Torrent	(substituted in) 106'
FW	18	Ouleymata Sarr	(substituted in) 106'
Manager:
Corinne Diacre

GK	16	Daphne van Domselaar
RB	5	Lynn Wilms		(substituted off) 115'
CB	3	Stefanie van der Gragt	(yellow card) 72'
CB	20	Dominique Janssen	(yellow card) 101'
LB	18	Kerstin Casparij		(substituted off) 106'
CM	14	Jackie Groenen
CM	10	Daniëlle van de Donk		(substituted off) 72'
CM	8	Sherida Spitse		(substituted off) 106'
RF	7	Lineth Beerensteyn		(substituted off) 46'
CF	9	Vivianne Miedema (c)	(yellow card) 103'
LF	12	Victoria Pelova
Substitutions:
MF	6	Jill Roord		(substituted in) 46'
FW	22	Esmee Brugts		(substituted in) 72'
DF	2	Aniek Nouwen		(substituted in) 106'
FW	17	Romée Leuchter		(substituted in) 106'
MF	21	Damaris Egurrola		(substituted in) 115'
Manager:
(England) Mark Parsons

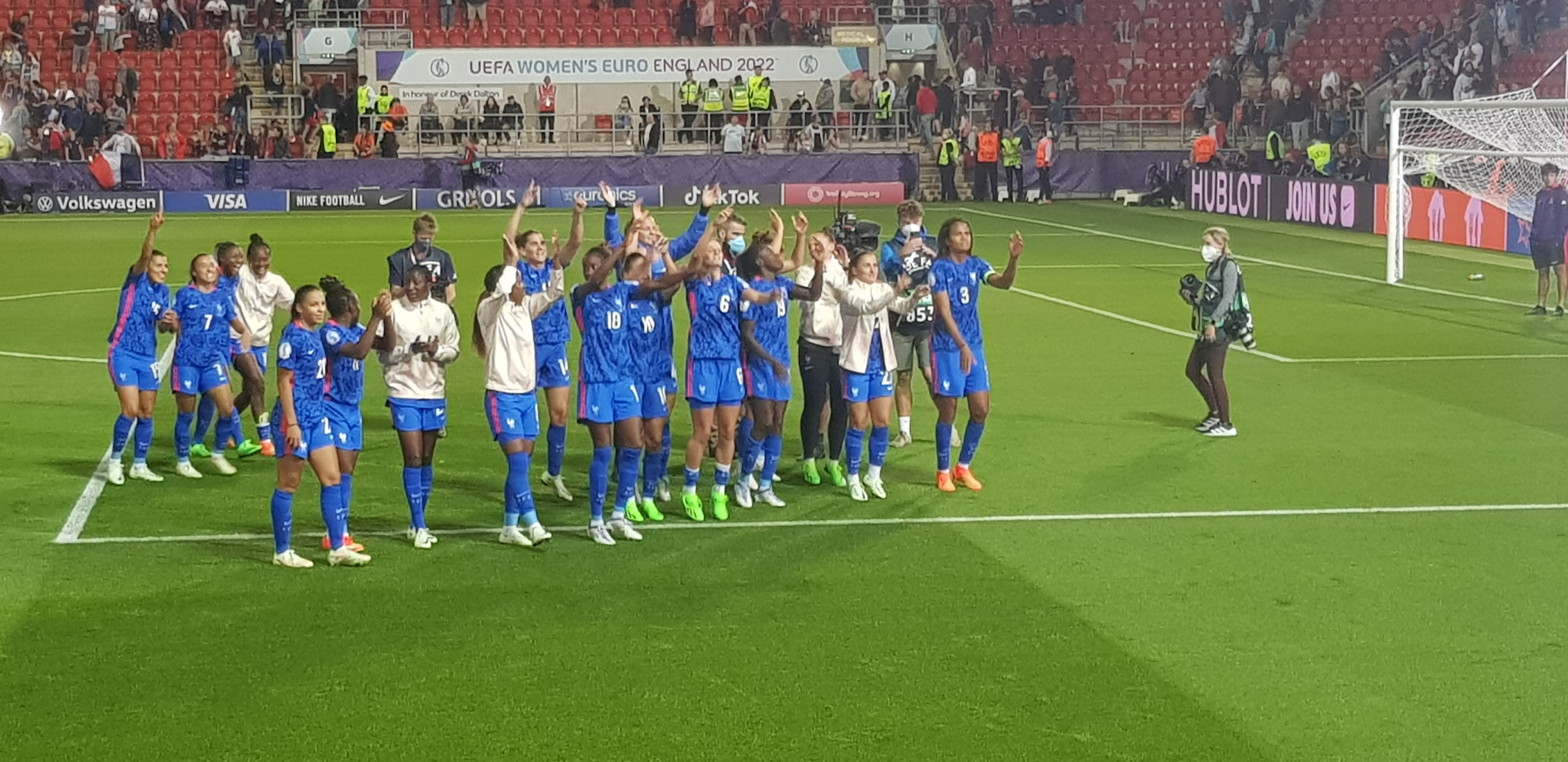
The French team celebrate with their supporters after the match

Player of the Match:
Selma Bacha (France)

Assistant referees:
Sanja Rođak-Karšić (Croatia)
Staša Špur (Slovenia)
Fourth official:
Marta Huerta de Aza (Spain)
Video assistant referee:
Tiago Martins (Portugal)
Assistant video assistant referees:
Luís Godinho (Portugal)
Tomasz Kwiatkowski (Poland)

== Semi-finals ==
=== England vs Sweden ===
26 July 2022
20:00

England	4–0	Sweden
Mead 34'; Bronze 48'; Russo 68'; Kirby 76'	Report

Bramall Lane, Sheffield
Attendance: 28,624
Referee: Esther Staubli (Switzerland)

England	Sweden

GK	1	Mary Earps
RB	2	Lucy Bronze
CB	6	Millie Bright
CB	8	Leah Williamson (c)
LB	3	Rachel Daly		(substituted off) 86'
CM	10	Georgia Stanway	(yellow card) 85'	(substituted off) 86'
CM	4	Keira Walsh
RW	7	Beth Mead		(substituted off) 86'
AM	14	Fran Kirby		(substituted off) 79'
LW	11	Lauren Hemp
CF	9	Ellen White		(substituted off) 57'
Substitutions:
FW	23	Alessia Russo		(substituted in) 57'
MF	20	Ella Toone		(substituted in) 79'
FW	18	Chloe Kelly		(substituted in) 86'
MF	16	Jill Scott		(substituted in) 86'
DF	5	Alex Greenwood		(substituted in) 86'
Manager:
(Netherlands) Sarina Wiegman

GK	1	Hedvig Lindahl
RB	13	Amanda Ilestedt		(substituted off) 55'
CB	3	Linda Sembrant		(substituted off) 76'
CB	6	Magdalena Eriksson
LB	4	Hanna Glas
CM	16	Filippa Angeldahl		(substituted off) 51'
CM	9	Kosovare Asllani (c)
CM	14	Nathalie Björn	(yellow card) 73'
RF	18	Fridolina Rolfö
CF	11	Stina Blackstenius		(substituted off) 76'
LF	10	Sofia Jakobsson		(substituted off) 51'
Substitutions:
MF	17	Caroline Seger		(substituted in) 51'
FW	19	Johanna Rytting Kaneryd		(substituted in) 51'
DF	2	Jonna Andersson		(substituted in) 55'
FW	8	Lina Hurtig		(substituted in) 76'
MF	20	Hanna Bennison		(substituted in) 76'
Manager:
Peter Gerhardsson

Player of the Match:
Beth Mead (England)

Assistant referees:
Susanne Küng (Switzerland)
Sara Telek (Austria)
Fourth official:
Kateryna Monzul (Ukraine)
Video assistant referee:
Pol van Boekel (Netherlands)
Assistant video assistant referees:
Dennis Higler (Netherlands)
Paolo Valeri (Italy)

=== Germany vs France ===
27 July 2022
20:00

Germany	2–1	France
Popp 40', 76'	Report	Frohms 44' (o.g.)

Stadium MK, Milton Keynes
Attendance: 27,445
Referee: Cheryl Foster (Wales)

Germany	France

GK	1	Merle Frohms
RB	15	Giulia Gwinn	(yellow card) 74'
CB	3	Kathrin Hendrich
CB	5	Marina Hegering		(substituted off) 81'
LB	17	Felicitas Rauch
CM	20	Lina Magull		(substituted off) 68'
CM	6	Lena Oberdorf	(yellow card) 90+4'
CM	13	Sara Däbritz		(substituted off) 68'
RF	9	Svenja Huth		(substituted off) 90+1'
CF	11	Alexandra Popp (c)
LF	22	Jule Brand
Substitutions:
MF	16	Linda Dallmann		(substituted in) 68'
MF	8	Sydney Lohmann		(substituted in) 68'
DF	23	Sara Doorsoun		(substituted in) 81'
FW	18	Tabea Waßmuth		(substituted in) 90+1'
Manager:
Martina Voss-Tecklenburg

GK	21	Pauline Peyraud-Magnin
RB	22	Ève Périsset
CB	19	Griedge Mbock Bathy
CB	3	Wendie Renard (c)
LB	7	Sakina Karchaoui
CM	14	Charlotte Bilbault
CM	6	Sandie Toletti	(yellow card) 21'	(substituted off) 80'
CM	8	Grace Geyoro
RF	11	Kadidiatou Diani
CF	12	Melvine Malard		(substituted off) 46'
LF	20	Delphine Cascarino		(substituted off) 61'
Substitutions:
DF	13	Selma Bacha	(yellow card) 56'	(substituted in) 46'
FW	10	Clara Matéo		(substituted in) 61'
FW	18	Ouleymata Sarr		(substituted in) 80'
Manager:
Corinne Diacre

Player of the Match:
Alexandra Popp (Germany)

Assistant referees:
Michelle O'Neill (Republic of Ireland)
Guadalupe Porras Ayuso (Spain)
Fourth official:
Lina Lehtovaara (Finland)
Video assistant referee:
Tomasz Kwiatkowski (Poland)
Assistant video assistant referees:
Bartosz Frankowski (Poland)
Tiago Martins (Portugal)

== Final ==
31 July 2022
17:00

England	2–1 (a.e.t.)	Germany
Toone 62'; Kelly 110'	Report	Magull 79'

Wembley Stadium, London
Attendance: 87,192
Referee: Kateryna Monzul (Ukraine)

England	Germany

GK	1	Mary Earps
RB	2	Lucy Bronze
CB	6	Millie Bright
CB	8	Leah Williamson (c)
LB	3	Rachel Daly		(substituted off) 88'
CM	10	Georgia Stanway	(yellow card) 23'	(substituted off) 88'
CM	4	Keira Walsh
RW	7	Beth Mead		(substituted off) 63'
AM	14	Fran Kirby		(substituted off) 55'
LW	11	Lauren Hemp		(substituted off) 120'
CF	9	Ellen White	(yellow card) 24'	(substituted off) 55'
Substitutions:
MF	20	Ella Toone		(substituted in) 55'
FW	23	Alessia Russo	(yellow card) 100'	(substituted in) 55'
FW	18	Chloe Kelly	(yellow card) 111'	(substituted in) 63'
DF	5	Alex Greenwood		(substituted in) 88'
MF	16	Jill Scott		(substituted in) 88'
FW	17	Nikita Parris		(substituted in) 120'
Manager:
(Netherlands) Sarina Wiegman

GK	1	Merle Frohms
RB	15	Giulia Gwinn
CB	3	Kathrin Hendrich
CB	5	Marina Hegering		(substituted off) 103'
LB	17	Felicitas Rauch	(yellow card) 40'	(substituted off) 113'
CM	20	Lina Magull		(substituted off) 91'
CM	6	Lena Oberdorf	(yellow card) 57'
CM	13	Sara Däbritz		(substituted off) 73'
RF	9	Svenja Huth (c)
CF	7	Lea Schüller	(yellow card) 57'	(substituted off) 67'
LF	22	Jule Brand		(substituted off) 46'
Substitutions:
FW	18	Tabea Waßmuth		(substituted in) 46'
FW	14	Nicole Anyomi		(substituted in) 67'
MF	8	Sydney Lohmann		(substituted in) 73'
MF	16	Linda Dallmann		(substituted in) 91'
DF	23	Sara Doorsoun		(substituted in) 103'
MF	4	Lena Lattwein		(substituted in) 113'
Manager:
Martina Voss-Tecklenburg

Player of the Match:
Keira Walsh (England)

Assistant referees:
Maryna Striletska (Ukraine)
Paulina Baranowska (Poland)
Fourth official:
Stéphanie Frappart (France)
Reserve assistant referee:
Karolin Kaivoja (Estonia)
Video assistant referee:
Paolo Valeri (Italy)
Assistant video assistant referees:
Maurizio Mariani (Italy)
Pol van Boekel (Netherlands)
