= UEFA Women's Euro 2022 Group A =

Football tournament group stage

Group A of UEFA Women's Euro 2022 was played from 6 to 15 July 2022. The pool was made up of hosts England, Austria, Norway and debutants Northern Ireland.

== Teams ==
Draw position	Team	Pot	Method of qualification	Date of qualification	Finals appearance	Last appearance	Previous best performance	UEFA Rankings October 2021 (Note: The UEFA rankings of October 2021 were used for seeding for the final draw.)	FIFA Rankings June 2022
A1	England	1	Host	3 December 2018	9th	2017	Runners-up (1984, 2009)	3	8
A2	Austria	3	Group G runners-up	23 February 2021	2nd	2017	Semi-finals (2017)	12	21
A3	Norway	2	Group C winner	27 October 2020	12th	2017	Winners (1987, 1993)	7	11
A4	Northern Ireland	4	Play-off winner	13 April 2021	1st	—	Debut	27	47

== Standings ==
Pos	Team	Pld	W	D	L	GF	GA	GD	Pts	Qualification
1	England (H)	3	3	0	0	14	0	+14	9	Advance to knockout stage
2	Austria	3	2	0	1	3	1	+2	6	Advance to knockout stage
3	Norway	3	1	0	2	4	10	−6	3	
4	Northern Ireland	3	0	0	3	1	11	−10	0	

Source: UEFA
Rules for classification: Group stage tiebreakers
(H) Hosts

== Matches ==
=== England vs Austria ===
6 July 2022
20:00

England	1–0	Austria
Mead 16'	Report

Old Trafford, Manchester
Attendance: 68,871
Referee: Marta Huerta de Aza (Spain)

England	Austria

GK	1	Mary Earps
RB	2	Lucy Bronze
CB	6	Millie Bright
CB	8	Leah Williamson (c)
LB	3	Rachel Daly
CM	10	Georgia Stanway
CM	4	Keira Walsh
AM	14	Fran Kirby	(substituted off) 63'
RW	7	Beth Mead	(substituted off) 64'
LW	11	Lauren Hemp
CF	9	Ellen White	(substituted off) 64'
Substitutions:
MF	20	Ella Toone	(substituted in) 63'
FW	18	Chloe Kelly	(substituted in) 64'
FW	23	Alessia Russo	(substituted in) 64'
Manager:
(Netherlands) Sarina Wiegman

GK	1	Manuela Zinsberger
RB	12	Laura Wienroither
CB	7	Carina Wenninger
CB	11	Viktoria Schnaderbeck (c)	(substituted off) 77'
LB	19	Verena Hanshaw
DM	17	Sarah Puntigam
RM	8	Barbara Dunst
CM	9	Sarah Zadrazil
CM	10	Laura Feiersinger	(substituted off) 87'
LM	3	Katharina Naschenweng	(substituted off) 59'
CF	15	Nicole Billa
Substitutions:
MF	18	Julia Hickelsberger	(substituted in) 59'
DF	2	Marina Georgieva	(substituted in) 77'
FW	14	Marie Höbinger	(substituted in) 87'
Manager:
Irene Fuhrmann

Player of the Match:
Georgia Stanway (England)

Assistant referees:
Guadalupe Porras Ayuso (Spain)
Francesca Di Monte (Italy)
Fourth official:
Stéphanie Frappart (France)
Video assistant referee:
José María Sánchez Martínez (Spain)
Assistant video assistant referee:
Guillermo Cuadra Fernández (Spain)

=== Norway vs Northern Ireland ===
7 July 2022
20:00

Norway	4–1	Northern Ireland
Blakstad 10'; Maanum 13'; Graham Hansen 31' (pen.); Reiten 54'	Report	Nelson 49'

St Mary's Stadium, Southampton
Attendance: 9,146
Referee: Lina Lehtovaara (Finland)

Norway	Northern Ireland

GK	1	Guro Pettersen
RB	2	Anja Sønstevold	(substituted off) 65'
CB	6	Maren Mjelde (c)	(substituted off) 81'
CB	3	Maria Thorisdottir
LB	17	Julie Blakstad	(substituted off) 89'
CM	18	Frida Maanum	(substituted off) 65'
CM	7	Ingrid Syrstad Engen
RW	15	Amalie Eikeland	(substituted off) 65'
AM	10	Caroline Graham Hansen
LW	11	Guro Reiten
CF	14	Ada Hegerberg
Substitutions:
MF	8	Vilde Bøe Risa	(substituted in) 65'
MF	9	Karina Sævik	(substituted in) 65'
DF	4	Tuva Hansen	(substituted in) 65'
DF	5	Guro Bergsvand	(substituted in) 81'
FW	21	Anna Jøsendal	(substituted in) 89'
Manager:
(Sweden) Martin Sjögren

GK	1	Jackie Burns
RB	13	Kelsie Burrows		(substituted off) 65'
CB	5	Julie Nelson
CB	4	Sarah Robson (c)	(yellow card) 53'
LB	3	Demi Vance
CM	10	Rachel Furness		(substituted off) 74'
CM	7	Chloe McCarron
CM	16	Nadene Caldwell		(substituted off) 46'
RF	22	Abbie Magee
CF	14	Lauren Wade		(substituted off) 79'
LF	9	Simone Magill		(substituted off) 79'
Substitutions:
MF	8	Marissa Callaghan		(substituted in) 46'
DF	15	Rebecca Holloway		(substituted in) 65'
FW	11	Kirsty McGuinness		(substituted in) 74'
FW	21	Caitlin McGuinness		(substituted in) 79'
FW	19	Emily Wilson		(substituted in) 79'
Manager:
Kenny Shiels

Player of the Match:
Caroline Graham Hansen (Norway)

Assistant referees:
Karolin Kaivoja (Estonia)
Chrysoula Kourompylia (Greece)
Fourth official:
Tess Olofsson (Sweden)
Video assistant referee:
Tiago Martins (Portugal)
Assistant video assistant referee:
Luís Godinho (Portugal)

=== Austria vs Northern Ireland ===
11 July 2022
17:00

Austria	2–0	Northern Ireland
Schiechtl 19'; Naschenweng 88'	Report

St Mary's Stadium, Southampton
Attendance: 9,268
Referee: Emikar Calderas (Venezuela)

Austria	Northern Ireland

GK	1	Manuela Zinsberger
RB	6	Katharina Schiechtl
CB	7	Carina Wenninger
CB	11	Viktoria Schnaderbeck (c)	(substituted off) 46'
LB	19	Verena Hanshaw
DM	17	Sarah Puntigam
RM	18	Julia Hickelsberger	(substituted off) 73'
CM	9	Sarah Zadrazil
CM	14	Marie Höbinger	(substituted off) 46'
LM	8	Barbara Dunst
CF	15	Nicole Billa	(substituted off) 85'
Substitutions:
MF	10	Laura Feiersinger	(substituted in) 46'
DF	2	Marina Georgieva	(substituted in) 46'
DF	3	Katharina Naschenweng	(substituted in) 73'
FW	20	Lisa Makas	(substituted in) 85'
Manager:
Irene Fuhrmann

GK	1	Jackie Burns
RB	2	Rebecca McKenna	(substituted off) 73'
CB	5	Julie Nelson	(substituted off) 85'
CB	4	Sarah Robson
LB	3	Demi Vance
RM	10	Rachel Furness	(substituted off) 79'
CM	8	Marissa Callaghan (c)	(substituted off) 85'
CM	7	Chloe McCarron
LM	15	Rebecca Holloway
CF	14	Lauren Wade
CF	11	Kirsty McGuinness	(substituted off) 79'
Substitutions:
DF	22	Abbie Magee	(substituted in) 73'
MF	20	Joely Andrews	(substituted in) 79'
FW	19	Emily Wilson	(substituted in) 79'
FW	21	Caitlin McGuinness	(substituted in) 85'
MF	18	Louise McDaniel	(substituted in) 85'
Manager:
Kenny Shiels

Player of the Match:
Barbara Dunst (Austria)

Assistant referees:
Migdalia Rodríguez Chirino (Venezuela)
Mary Blanco Bolívar (Colombia)
Fourth official:
Marta Huerta de Aza (Spain)
Video assistant referee:
José María Sánchez Martínez (Spain)
Assistant video assistant referee:
Guillermo Cuadra Fernández (Spain)

=== England vs Norway ===
11 July 2022
20:00

England	8–0	Norway
Stanway 12' (pen.); Hemp 15'; White 29', 41'; Mead 34', 38', 81'; Russo 66'	Report

Falmer Stadium, Brighton and Hove
Attendance: 28,847
Referee: Riem Hussein (Germany)

England	Norway

GK	1	Mary Earps
RB	2	Lucy Bronze
CB	6	Millie Bright
CB	8	Leah Williamson (c)
LB	3	Rachel Daly	(substituted off) 57'
CM	10	Georgia Stanway	(substituted off) 80'
CM	4	Keira Walsh
AM	14	Fran Kirby	(substituted off) 57'
RF	7	Beth Mead
CF	9	Ellen White	(substituted off) 57'
LF	11	Lauren Hemp	(substituted off) 70'
Substitutions:
FW	23	Alessia Russo	(substituted in) 57'
DF	5	Alex Greenwood	(substituted in) 57'
MF	20	Ella Toone	(substituted in) 57'
FW	18	Chloe Kelly	(substituted in) 70'
MF	16	Jill Scott	(substituted in) 80'
Manager:
(Netherlands) Sarina Wiegman

GK	1	Guro Pettersen
RB	4	Tuva Hansen
CB	6	Maren Mjelde (c)
CB	3	Maria Thorisdottir
LB	17	Julie Blakstad	(yellow card) 56'
RM	9	Karina Sævik		(substituted off) 46'
CM	8	Vilde Bøe Risa		(substituted off) 59'
CM	7	Ingrid Syrstad Engen
LM	11	Guro Reiten		(substituted off) 84'
SS	10	Caroline Graham Hansen		(substituted off) 75'
CF	14	Ada Hegerberg		(substituted off) 75'
Substitutions:
DF	5	Guro Bergsvand		(substituted in) 46'
MF	18	Frida Maanum	(yellow card) 87'	(substituted in) 59'
FW	13	Celin Bizet Ildhusøy	(yellow card) 77'	(substituted in) 75'
MF	15	Amalie Eikeland		(substituted in) 75'
MF	19	Elisabeth Terland		(substituted in) 84'
Manager:
(Sweden) Martin Sjögren

Player of the Match:
Beth Mead (England)

Assistant referees:
Katrin Rafalski (Germany)
Susanne Küng (Switzerland)
Fourth official:
Esther Staubli (Switzerland)
Video assistant referee:
Christian Dingert (Germany)
Assistant video assistant referee:
Harm Osmers (Germany)

=== Northern Ireland vs England ===
15 July 2022
20:00

Northern Ireland	0–5	England
	Report	Kirby 40'; Mead 44'; Russo 48', 53'; Burrows 76' (o.g.)

St Mary's Stadium, Southampton
Attendance: 30,785
Referee: Esther Staubli (Switzerland)

Northern Ireland	England

GK	1	Jackie Burns
RB	2	Rebecca McKenna
CB	5	Julie Nelson	(substituted off) 87'
CB	4	Sarah Robson
LB	3	Demi Vance
RM	17	Laura Rafferty	(substituted off) 66'
CM	8	Marissa Callaghan (c)	(substituted off) 87'
CM	10	Rachel Furness	(substituted off) 80'
LM	15	Rebecca Holloway	(substituted off) 66'
CF	14	Lauren Wade
CF	11	Kirsty McGuinness
Substitutions:
DF	22	Abbie Magee	(substituted in) 66'
DF	13	Kelsie Burrows	(substituted in) 66'
MF	16	Nadene Caldwell	(substituted in) 80'
FW	19	Emily Wilson	(substituted in) 87'
DF	6	Ashley Hutton	(substituted in) 87'
Manager:
Kenny Shiels

GK	1	Mary Earps
RB	2	Lucy Bronze	(substituted off) 74'
CB	6	Millie Bright	(substituted off) 46'
CB	8	Leah Williamson (c)
LB	3	Rachel Daly
CM	10	Georgia Stanway	(substituted off) 46'
CM	4	Keira Walsh
AM	14	Fran Kirby
RW	7	Beth Mead
LW	11	Lauren Hemp	(substituted off) 60'
CF	9	Ellen White	(substituted off) 46'
Substitutions:
FW	23	Alessia Russo	(substituted in) 46'
DF	5	Alex Greenwood	(substituted in) 46'
MF	20	Ella Toone	(substituted in) 46'
FW	18	Chloe Kelly	(substituted in) 60'
DF	12	Jess Carter	(substituted in) 74'
Manager:
(Netherlands) Sarina Wiegman

Player of the Match:
Alessia Russo (England)

Assistant referees:
Susanne Küng (Switzerland)
Franca Overtoom (Netherlands)
Fourth official:
Stéphanie Frappart (Switzerland)
Video assistant referee:
Harm Osmers (Germany)
Assistant video assistant referee:
Christian Dingert (Germany)

=== Austria vs Norway ===
15 July 2022
20:00

Austria	1–0	Norway
Billa 37'	Report

Falmer Stadium, Brighton and Hove
Attendance: 12,667
Referee: Kateryna Monzul (Ukraine)

Austria	Norway

GK	1	Manuela Zinsberger
RB	12	Laura Wienroither
CB	7	Carina Wenninger	(yellow card) 45'
CB	11	Viktoria Schnaderbeck (c)
LB	19	Verena Hanshaw
DM	17	Sarah Puntigam
CM	9	Sarah Zadrazil
CM	10	Laura Feiersinger
RW	18	Julia Hickelsberger	(yellow card) 20'	(substituted off) 72'
LW	8	Barbara Dunst
CF	15	Nicole Billa		(substituted off) 88'
Substitutions:
FW	20	Lisa Makas		(substituted in) 72'
DF	2	Marina Georgieva		(substituted in) 88'
Manager:
Irene Fuhrmann

GK	1	Guro Pettersen
RB	4	Tuva Hansen
CB	5	Guro Bergsvand
CB	6	Maren Mjelde (c)
LB	17	Julie Blakstad	(substituted off) 82'
RM	15	Amalie Eikeland	(substituted off) 64'
CM	18	Frida Maanum	(substituted off) 86'
CM	7	Ingrid Syrstad Engen
LM	11	Guro Reiten
SS	10	Caroline Graham Hansen
CF	14	Ada Hegerberg
Substitutions:
FW	13	Celin Bizet Ildhusøy	(substituted in) 64'
FW	22	Sophie Roman Haug	(substituted in) 82'
MF	8	Vilde Bøe Risa	(substituted in) 86'
Manager:
(Sweden) Martin Sjögren

Player of the Match:
Nicole Billa (Austria)

Assistant referees:
Maryna Striletska (Ukraine)
Paulina Baranowska (Poland)
Fourth official:
Ivana Projkovska (North Macedonia)
Video assistant referee:
Paolo Valeri (Italy)
Assistant video assistant referee:
Maurizio Mariani (Italy)

== Discipline ==
Fair play points will be used as tiebreakers in the group if the overall and head-to-head records of teams were tied. These are calculated based on yellow and red cards received in all group matches as follows:

- first yellow card: plus 1 point;
- indirect red card (second yellow card): plus 3 points;
- direct red card: plus 4 points;
- yellow card and direct red card: plus 5 points;

Team	Match 1				Match 2				Match 3				Points
Team	Booked	(yellow card) (yellow-red card)	Sent off (straight red)	(yellow card) (red card)	Booked	(yellow card) (yellow-red card)	Sent off (straight red)	(yellow card) (red card)	Booked	(yellow card) (yellow-red card)	Sent off (straight red)	(yellow card) (red card)	Points
England													0
Northern Ireland	1												−1
Austria									2				−2
Norway					3								−3
