= England at the UEFA Women's Championship =

Nation at sport competition

England's UEFA Women's Championship Record includes reaching the UEFA Women's Championship final on 4 occasions, winning the competition twice consecutively and are the current European Champions. England women have also been losing semi-finalists on three occasions, and got knocked out in the finals group stage three times. On four occasions, including the 1989 to 1997 finals inclusive, England have failed to qualify for the final tournament.

== About the competition ==
In 1984 there was no finals tournament. Instead, the competition took place as follows: UEFA divided all entrant countries into four groups. Four group winners were determined on a points basis after all teams played each other both home and away. Two points were awarded for a win throughout this period. The four group winners were paired off and played each other as a knockout competition on a two-legged home & away basis. The final was two-legged.

From 1987 there has been a finals tournament and a single host nation, always chosen from the eventual qualifiers. From 1987 until 1993 there were four teams in the finals, increased to eight in 1997, then expanded again to 12 for 2009 and 17 from 2017 onwards. In 1995 the competition proceeded on a two-legged home & away basis until a one-off final.

Note: All tournaments have been two-year campaigns. The year represents the year in which the finals actually took place.

Summary	P	W	D	L	F	A
Qualification Stage	64	41	11	12	168	54
Finals matches	20	7	2	11	26	40
Total	84	48	13	23	194	94

Statistics correct as of 31 December 2009

== 1984 – Reached Final ==
Sweden won.

Qualifying Group 2		P	W	D	L	F	A	Pts
1	England	6	6	0	0	24	1	12
2	Scotland	6	3	1	2	9	8	7
3	Republic of Ireland	6	2	1	3	6	14	5
4	Northern Ireland	6	0	0	6	5	21	0

- England 7–1 Northern Ireland
- Scotland 0–4 England
- Republic of Ireland 0–1 England
- Northern Ireland 0–4 England
- England 2–0 Scotland
- England 6–0 Republic of Ireland

England qualify as group winners

Semi-final

- England 2–1 Denmark
- Denmark 0–1 England

England win 3–1 on aggregate

Final

- Sweden 1–0 England
- England 1–0 Sweden

England lose 4–3 on penalties

England finish as runners-up

== 1987 in Norway – Reached Semi-final ==
Norway won.

Qualifying Group 2		P	W	D	L	F	A	Pts
1	England	6	6	0	0	34	2	12
2	Scotland	6	4	0	2	24	10	8
3	Republic of Ireland	6	2	0	4	4	17	4
4	Northern Ireland	6	0	0	6	2	36	0

- England 4–0 Scotland
- Northern Ireland 1–7 England
- Republic of Ireland 0–6 England
- England 10–0 Northern Ireland
- England 4–0 Republic of Ireland
- Scotland 1–3 England

England qualify as group winners

Semi-final

- Sweden 3–2 England (a.e.t.)

Third Place Match

- Italy 2–1 England

England finish fourth

== 1989 in West Germany – Did not qualify ==
West Germany won.

Qualifying Group 1		P	W	D	L	F	A	Pts
1	Denmark	6	5	0	1	12	6	10
2	Norway	6	2	1	3	10	10	5
3	England	6	2	1	3	6	10	5
4	Finland	6	1	2	3	9	11	4

- Finland 1–2 England
- England 2–1 Denmark
- Denmark 2–0 England
- Norway 2–0 England
- England 1–1 Finland
- England 1–3 Norway

England finish third and fail to qualify

== 1991 in Denmark – Did not qualify ==
Germany won.

Qualifying Group 3		P	W	D	L	F	A	Pts
1	Norway	6	5	1	0	12	0	11
2	England	6	2	3	1	4	2	7
3	Finland	6	1	2	3	3	6	4
4	Belgium	6	1	0	5	1	12	2

- England 0–0 Finland
- Belgium 0–3 England
- England 1–0 Belgium
- Norway 2–0 England
- England 0–0 Norway
- Finland 0–0 England

England qualify from the group in second place

Second Round/Quarter-final

- England 1–4 Germany
- Germany 2–0 England

England lose 6–1 on aggregate

== 1993 in Italy – Did not qualify ==
Norway won.

Qualifying Group 3		P	W	D	L	F	A	Pts
1	England	4	4	0	0	9	1	8
2	Iceland	4	1	1	2	3	7	3
3	Scotland	4	0	1	3	1	5	2

- England 1–0 Scotland
- England 4–0 Iceland
- Iceland 1–2 England
- Scotland 0–2 England

England qualify as group winners

Second Round/Quarter-final

- Italy 3–2 England
- England 0–3 Italy

England lose 6–2 on aggregate

== 1995 – Reached Semi-final ==
Germany won.

Qualifying Group 7		P	W	D	L	F	A	Pts
1	England	6	4	2	0	29	0	10
2	Spain	6	3	3	0	29	0	9
3	Belgium	6	2	1	3	15	13	5
4	Slovenia	6	0	0	6	0	60	0

- Slovenia 0–10 England
- Belgium 0–3 England
- Spain 0–0 England
- England 0–0 Spain
- England 6–0 Belgium
- England 10–0 Slovenia

England qualify as group winners

Quarter-final

- Iceland 1–2 England
- England 2–1 Iceland

England win 4–2 on aggregate

Semi-final

- England 1–4 Germany
- Germany 2–1 England

England lose 6–2 on aggregate

England finish equal third

== 1997 in Norway and Sweden – Did not qualify ==
Germany won.

Qualifying Group 3		P	W	D	L	F	A	Pts
1	Italy	6	4	2	0	16	3	14
2	England	6	4	1	1	17	3	13
3	Portugal	6	2	0	4	4	14	6
4	Croatia	6	0	1	5	0	17	1

- England 1–1 Italy
- England 5–0 Croatia
- Portugal 0–5 England
- Italy 2–1 England
- Croatia 0–2 England
- England 3–0 Portugal

England qualify from the group in second place

Qualification Playoff

- Spain 2–1 England
- England 1–1 Spain

England lose 3–2 on aggregate

England finish equal ninth

== 2001 in Germany – Reached Finals Group Stage ==
Germany won.

Qualifying Group 2		P	W	D	L	F	A	Pts
1	Norway	6	6	0	0	25	0	18
2	England	6	3	1	2	8	13	10
3	Portugal	6	1	1	4	4	14	4
4	Switzerland	6	1	0	5	1	11	3

- Switzerland 0–3 England
- England 2–0 Portugal
- England 0–3 Norway
- Portugal 2–2 England
- England 1–0 Switzerland
- Norway 8–0 England

England qualify from the group in second place

Qualification Playoff

- Ukraine 1–2 England
- England 2–0 Ukraine

England win 4–1 on aggregate and qualify for the Final Tournament

Finals Group A		P	W	D	L	F	A	Pts
1	Germany	3	3	0	0	11	1	9
2	Sweden	3	2	0	1	6	3	6
3	Russia	3	0	1	2	1	7	1
4	England	3	0	1	2	1	8	1

- England 1–1 Russia
- England 0–4 Sweden
- England 0–3 Germany

England finish fourth in the group and fail to progress

England finish equal seventh overall

== 2005 in England – Reached Finals Group Stage ==
Germany won.

England qualify for the Final Tournament as hosts

Finals Group A		P	W	D	L	F	A	Pts
1	Sweden	3	1	2	0	2	1	5
2	Finland	3	1	1	1	4	4	4
3	Denmark	3	1	1	1	4	4	4
4	England	3	1	0	2	4	5	3

- England 3–2 Finland
- England 1–2 Denmark
- England 0–1 Sweden

England finish fourth in the group and fail to progress

England finish equal seventh overall

== 2009 in Finland – Reached Final ==
Germany won.

Qualifying Group 1		P	W	D	L	F	A	Pts
1	England	8	6	2	0	24	4	20
2	Spain	8	5	2	1	24	7	17
3	Czech Republic	8	4	2	2	18	14	14
4	Belarus	8	1	1	6	10	27	4
5	Northern Ireland	8	0	1	7	2	26	1

- England 4–0 Northern Ireland
- England 4–0 Belarus
- England 1–0 Spain
- Northern Ireland 0–2 England
- England 0–0 Czech Republic
- Belarus 1–6 England
- Czech Republic 1–5 England
- Spain 2–2 England

England qualify as group winners

Finals Group C		P	W	D	L	F	A	Pts
1	Sweden	3	2	1	0	6	1	7
2	Italy	3	2	0	1	4	3	6
3	England	3	1	1	1	5	5	4
4	Russia	3	0	0	3	2	8	0

- England 1–2 Italy
- England 3–2 Russia
- England 1–1 Sweden

England qualify from the group in third place

Quarter-final

- England 3–2 Finland

Semi-final

- England 2–1 Netherlands (a.e.t.)

Final

- England 2–6 Germany

England finish as runners-up

== 2013 in Sweden – Reached Finals Group Stage ==
England got eliminated in the first round.

=== Group C ===
Pos	Team	Pld	W	D	L	GF	GA	GD	Pts	Qualification
1	France	3	3	0	0	7	1	+6	9	Advance to knockout stage
2	Spain	3	1	1	1	4	4	0	4	Advance to knockout stage
3	Russia	3	0	2	1	3	5	−2	2	
4	England	3	0	1	2	3	7	−4	1	

Source: UEFA.com

Germany won.

12 July 2013
20:30

England	2–3	Spain
Aluko 8'; Bassett 89'	Report	Boquete 4'; Hermoso 85'; Putellas 90+4'

Arena Linköping, Linköping
Attendance: 5,190
Referee: Kateryna Monzul (Ukraine)

15 July 2013
18:00

England	1–1	Russia
Duggan 90+2'	Report	Korovkina 38'

Arena Linköping, Linköping
Attendance: 3,629
Referee: Bibiana Steinhaus (Germany)

18 July 2013
20:30

France	3–0	England
Le Sommer 9'; Nécib 62'; Renard 64'	Report

Arena Linköping, Linköping
Attendance: 7,332
Referee: Kirsi Heikkinen (Finland)

== 2017 in the Netherlands – Reached Semi-final ==
England reached the semi-final.

=== Group D ===
Pos	Team	Pld	W	D	L	GF	GA	GD	Pts	Qualification
1	England	3	3	0	0	10	1	+9	9	Knockout stage
2	Spain	3	1	0	2	2	3	−1	3 (Note: Tied on head-to-head points (3). Head-to-head goal difference: Spain +1, Scotland 0, Portugal −1.)	Knockout stage
3	Scotland	3	1	0	2	2	8	−6	3	
4	Portugal	3	1	0	2	3	5	−2	3	

Source: UEFA
Rules for classification: Group stage tiebreakers
Notes:
19 July 2017
20:45

England	6–0	Scotland
Taylor 11', 26', 53'; White 32'; Nobbs 87'; Duggan 90+3'	Report

Stadion Galgenwaard, Utrecht
Attendance: 5,578
Referee: Esther Staubli (Switzerland)

23 July 2017
20:45

England	2–0	Spain
Kirby 2'; Taylor 85'	Report

Rat Verlegh Stadion, Breda
Attendance: 4,879
Referee: Carina Vitulano (Italy)

27 July 2017
20:45

Portugal	1–2	England
C. Mendes 17'	Report	Duggan 7'; Parris 48'

Koning Willem II Stadion, Tilburg
Attendance: 3,335
Referee: Kateryna Monzul (Ukraine)

=== Quarter-finals ===
30 July 2017
20:45

England	1–0	France
Taylor 60'	Report

De Adelaarshorst, Deventer
Attendance: 6,283
Referee: Esther Staubli (Switzerland)

=== Semi-finals ===
3 August 2017
20:45

Netherlands	3–0	England
Miedema 22'; Van de Donk 62'; Bright 90+3' (o.g.)	Report

De Grolsch Veste, Enschede
Attendance: 27,093
Referee: Stéphanie Frappart (France)

== 2022 in England – Reached Final ==
England hosted the competition. England won the competition 2-1.

=== Group A ===
England won.

Pos	Team	Pld	W	D	L	GF	GA	GD	Pts	Qualification
1	England (H)	3	3	0	0	14	0	+14	9	Advance to knockout stage
2	Austria	3	2	0	1	3	1	+2	6	Advance to knockout stage
3	Norway	3	1	0	2	4	10	−6	3	
4	Northern Ireland	3	0	0	3	1	11	−10	0	

Source: UEFA
(H) Hosts
6 July 2022
20:00

England	1–0	Austria
Mead 16'	Report

Old Trafford, Manchester
Attendance: 68,871
Referee: Marta Huerta de Aza (Spain)

11 July 2022
20:00

England	8–0	Norway
Stanway 12' (pen.); Hemp 15'; White 29', 41'; Mead 34', 38', 81'; Russo 66'	Report

Falmer Stadium, Brighton and Hove
Attendance: 28,847
Referee: Riem Hussein (Germany)

15 July 2022
20:00

Northern Ireland	0–5	England
	Report	Kirby 40'; Mead 44'; Russo 48', 53'; Burrows 76' (o.g.)

St Mary's Stadium, Southampton
Attendance: 30,785
Referee: Esther Staubli (Switzerland)

=== Quarter-finals ===
20 July 2022
20:00

England	2–1 (a.e.t.)	Spain
Toone 84'; Stanway 96'	Report	González 54'

Falmer Stadium, Brighton and Hove
Attendance: 28,994
Referee: Stéphanie Frappart (France)

=== Semi-finals ===
26 July 2022
20:00

England	4–0	Sweden
Mead 34'; Bronze 48'; Russo 68'; Kirby 76'	Report

Bramall Lane, Sheffield
Attendance: 28,624
Referee: Esther Staubli (Switzerland)

=== Final ===
31 July 2022
17:00

England	2–1 (a.e.t.)	Germany
Toone 62'; Kelly 110'	Report	Magull 79'

Wembley Stadium, London
Attendance: 87,192
Referee: Kateryna Monzul (Ukraine)

== 2025 in Switzerland – Reached Final ==
=== Group D ===
England won.

Pos	Team	Pld	W	D	L	GF	GA	GD	Pts	Qualification
1	France	3	3	0	0	11	4	+7	9	Advance to knockout stage
2	England	3	2	0	1	11	3	+8	6	Advance to knockout stage
3	Netherlands	3	1	0	2	5	9	−4	3	
4	Wales	3	0	0	3	2	13	−11	0	

Source: UEFA
Rules for classification: Group stage tiebreakers
5 July 2025
21:00

France	2–1	England
Katoto 36'; Baltimore 39'	Report	Walsh 87'

Stadion Letzigrund, Zurich
Attendance: 22,542
Referee: Tess Olofsson (Sweden)

9 July 2025
18:00

England	4–0	Netherlands
James 22', 60'; Stanway 45+2'; Toone 67'	Report

Stadion Letzigrund, Zurich
Attendance: 22,600
Referee: Edina Alves Batista (Brazil)

13 July 2025
21:00

England	6–1	Wales
Stanway 13' (pen.); Toone 21'; Hemp 30'; Russo 44'; Mead 72'; Beever-Jones 89'	Report	Cain 76'

Arena St.Gallen, St. Gallen
Attendance: 15,953
Referee: Frida Klarlund (Denmark)

=== Quarter-finals ===
17 July 2025
21:00

Sweden	2–2 (a.e.t.)	England
Asllani 2'; Blackstenius 25'	Report	Bronze 79'; Agyemang 81'
Penalties
Angeldahl (penalty missed); Zigiotti Olme (penalty scored); Eriksson (penalty missed); Björn (penalty scored); Falk (penalty missed); Jakobsson (penalty missed); Holmberg (penalty missed)	2–3	(penalty scored) Russo; (penalty missed) James; (penalty missed) Mead; (penalty missed) Greenwood; (penalty scored) Kelly; (penalty missed) Clinton; (penalty scored) Bronze

Stadion Letzigrund, Zurich
Attendance: 22,397
Referee: Marta Huerta de Aza (Spain)

=== Semi-finals ===
22 July 2025
21:00

England	2–1 (a.e.t.)	Italy
Agyemang 90+6'; Kelly 119'	Report	Bonansea 33'

Stade de Genève, Geneva
Attendance: 26,539
Referee: Ivana Martinčić (Croatia)

=== Final ===
27 July 2025
18:00

England	1–1 (a.e.t.)	Spain
Russo 57'	Report	Caldentey 25'
Penalties
Mead (penalty missed); Greenwood (penalty scored); Charles (penalty scored); Williamson (penalty missed); Kelly (penalty scored)	3–1	(penalty scored) Guijarro; (penalty missed) Caldentey; (penalty missed) Bonmatí; (penalty missed) Paralluelo

St. Jakob-Park, Basel
Attendance: 34,203
Referee: Stéphanie Frappart (France)

== Record ==
Year	Result	Pld	W	D*	L	GF	GA
1984	Runners-up	4	3	0	1	4	2
(Norway) 1987	Fourth place	2	0	0	2	3	5
(West Germany) 1989	Did not qualify						
(Denmark) 1991	Did not qualify						
(Italy) 1993	Did not qualify						
(England) (Germany) (Norway) (Sweden) 1995	Semi-finals	2	0	0	2	2	6
(Norway) (Sweden) 1997	Did not qualify						
(Germany) 2001	Group stage	3	0	1	2	1	8
(England) 2005	Group stage	3	1	0	2	4	5
(Finland) 2009	Runners-up	6	3	1	2	12	14
(Sweden) 2013	Group stage	3	0	1	2	3	7
(Netherlands) 2017	Semi-finals	5	4	0	1	11	4
(England) 2022	Champions	6	6	0	0	22	2
(Switzerland) 2025	Champions	6	3	2	1	16	7
(Germany) 2029	To be determined						
Total	10/14	40	20	5	15	78	60

*Draws include knockout matches decided by penalty shoot-outs.
**Red border colour denotes tournament was held on home soil.

== See also ==
- England women's national football team
- England at the FIFA Women's World Cup
