= UEFA Women's Euro 2022 Group C =

Football tournament group stage

Group C of UEFA Women's Euro 2022 was played from 9 to 17 July 2022. The pool was originally made up of the Netherlands, Sweden, Switzerland and Russia. Following the Russian invasion of Ukraine, Russia was banned from participating and Portugal replaced them.

== Teams ==
Draw position	Team	Pot	Method of qualification	Date of qualification	Finals appearance	Last appearance	Previous best performance	UEFA Rankings October 2021 (Note: The UEFA rankings of October 2021 were used for seeding for the final draw.)	FIFA Rankings June 2022
C1	Netherlands	1	Group A winner	23 October 2020	4th	2017	Winners (2017)	1	4
C2	Sweden	2	Group F winner	27 October 2020	11th	2017	Winners (1984)	5	2
C3	Switzerland	3	Play-off winner	13 April 2021	2nd	2017	Group stage (2017)	11	20
–	~~Russia~~	4	Play-off winner (voided)	13 April 2021	~~5th~~	2017	Group stage (1997, 2001, 2009, 2013, 2017)	~~15~~	~~24~~
C4	Portugal	4	Play-off loser	2 May 2022	2nd	2017	Group stage (2017)	23	30

1. Russia were suspended by FIFA and UEFA on 28 February 2022, with Portugal being chosen by UEFA to take their place on 2 May 2022. This would not have affected the draw, since both teams would be placed on pot 4.

== Standings ==
Pos	Team	Pld	W	D	L	GF	GA	GD	Pts	Qualification
1	Sweden	3	2	1	0	8	2	+6	7	Advance to knockout stage
2	Netherlands	3	2	1	0	8	4	+4	7	Advance to knockout stage
3	Switzerland	3	0	1	2	4	8	−4	1	
4	Portugal	3	0	1	2	4	10	−6	1	

Source: UEFA
Rules for classification: Group stage tiebreakers

== Matches ==
=== Portugal vs Switzerland ===
9 July 2022
17:00

Portugal	2–2	Switzerland
Gomes 58'; J. Silva 65'	Report	Sow 2'; Kiwic 5'

Leigh Sports Village, Leigh
Attendance: 5,902
Referee: Jana Adámková (Czech Republic)

Portugal	Switzerland

GK	1	Inês Pereira
RB	2	Catarina Amado
CB	19	Diana Gomes
CB	15	Carole Costa
LB	5	Joana Marchão
CM	11	Tatiana Pinto	(substituted off) 83'
CM	14	Dolores Silva (c)
CM	8	Andreia Norton
RF	9	Ana Borges	(substituted off) 77'
CF	10	Jéssica Silva	(substituted off) 83'
LF	16	Diana Silva
Substitutions:
MF	20	Francisca Nazareth	(substituted in) 77'
MF	13	Fátima Pinto	(substituted in) 83'
FW	23	Telma Encarnação	(substituted in) 83'
Manager:
Francisco Neto

GK	1	Gaëlle Thalmann
RB	5	Noelle Maritz
CB	18	Viola Calligaris	(yellow card) 69'
CB	14	Rahel Kiwic
LB	19	Eseosa Aigbogun	(yellow card) 18'
RM	9	Ana-Maria Crnogorčević
CM	13	Lia Wälti (c)		(substituted off) 90+1'
CM	8	Sandy Maendly		(substituted off) 74'
LM	6	Géraldine Reuteler	(yellow card) 82'	(substituted off) 90+1'
SS	11	Coumba Sow
CF	10	Ramona Bachmann
Substitutions:
DF	3	Lara Marti		(substituted in) 74'
FW	20	Fabienne Humm		(substituted in) 90+1'
MF	16	Sandrine Mauron		(substituted in) 90+1'
Manager:
(Denmark) Nils Nielsen

Player of the Match:
Ramona Bachmann (Switzerland)

Assistant referees:
Lucie Ratajová (Czech Republic)
Mária Súkeníková (Slovakia)
Fourth official:
Ivana Martinčić (Croatia)
Video assistant referee:
Christian Dingert (Germany)
Assistant video assistant referee:
Harm Osmers (Germany)

=== Netherlands vs Sweden ===
9 July 2022
20:00

Netherlands	1–1	Sweden
Roord 52'	Report	Andersson 35'

Bramall Lane, Sheffield
Attendance: 21,342
Referee: Cheryl Foster (Wales)

Netherlands	Sweden

GK	1	Sari van Veenendaal (c)	(substituted off) 22'
RB	5	Lynn Wilms
CB	3	Stefanie van der Gragt
CB	2	Aniek Nouwen	(substituted off) 41'
LB	20	Dominique Janssen
CM	14	Jackie Groenen
CM	10	Daniëlle van de Donk	(substituted off) 78'
CM	8	Sherida Spitse
RF	6	Jill Roord	(substituted off) 78'
CF	9	Vivianne Miedema
LF	11	Lieke Martens
Substitutions:
GK	16	Daphne van Domselaar	(substituted in) 22'
DF	19	Marisa Olislagers	(substituted in) 41'
MF	12	Victoria Pelova	(substituted in) 78'
FW	7	Lineth Beerensteyn	(substituted in) 78'
Manager:
(England) Mark Parsons

GK	1	Hedvig Lindahl
CB	13	Amanda Ilestedt
CB	14	Nathalie Björn
CB	6	Magdalena Eriksson
RM	4	Hanna Glas
CM	16	Filippa Angeldahl	(substituted off) 70'
CM	17	Caroline Seger (c)
LM	2	Jonna Andersson	(substituted off) 70'
RF	9	Kosovare Asllani
CF	8	Lina Hurtig	(substituted off) 70'
LF	18	Fridolina Rolfö
Substitutions:
FW	11	Stina Blackstenius	(substituted in) 70'
FW	19	Johanna Rytting Kaneryd	(substituted in) 70'
MF	20	Hanna Bennison	(substituted in) 70'
Manager:
Peter Gerhardsson

Player of the Match:
Vivianne Miedema (Netherlands)

Assistant referees:
Michelle O'Neill (Republic of Ireland)
Polyxeni Irodotou (Cyprus)
Fourth official:
Lorraine Watson (Scotland)
Video assistant referee:
Tomasz Kwiatkowski (Poland)
Assistant video assistant referee:
Bartosz Frankowski (Poland)

=== Sweden vs Switzerland ===
13 July 2022
17:00

Sweden	2–1	Switzerland
Rolfö 53'; Bennison 79'	Report	Bachmann 55'

Bramall Lane, Sheffield
Attendance: 12,914
Referee: Marta Huerta de Aza (Spain)

Sweden	Switzerland

GK	1	Hedvig Lindahl
RB	4	Hanna Glas
CB	13	Amanda Ilestedt
CB	14	Nathalie Björn
LB	6	Magdalena Eriksson
CM	16	Filippa Angeldahl	(substituted off) 68'
CM	9	Kosovare Asllani
CM	17	Caroline Seger (c)
RF	18	Fridolina Rolfö
CF	11	Stina Blackstenius	(substituted off) 79'
LF	8	Lina Hurtig	(substituted off) 68'
Substitutions:
MF	20	Hanna Bennison	(substituted in) 68'
FW	19	Johanna Rytting Kaneryd	(substituted in) 68'
FW	15	Rebecka Blomqvist	(substituted in) 79'
Manager:
Peter Gerhardsson

GK	1	Gaëlle Thalmann
RB	5	Noelle Maritz
CB	18	Viola Calligaris
CB	15	Luana Bühler
LB	19	Eseosa Aigbogun	(substituted off) 59'
CM	13	Lia Wälti (c)
CM	8	Sandy Maendly	(substituted off) 68'
RW	9	Ana-Maria Crnogorčević
AM	11	Coumba Sow
LW	6	Géraldine Reuteler	(substituted off) 59'
CF	10	Ramona Bachmann	(substituted off) 72'
Substitutions:
DF	4	Rachel Rinast	(substituted in) 59'
DF	22	Nadine Riesen	(substituted in) 59'
MF	16	Sandrine Mauron	(substituted in) 68'
FW	20	Fabienne Humm	(substituted in) 72'
Manager:
(Denmark) Nils Nielsen

Player of the Match:
Caroline Seger (Sweden)

Assistant referees:
Guadalupe Porras Ayuso (Spain)
Francesca Di Monte (Italy)
Fourth official:
Emikar Calderas Barrera (Venezuela)
Video assistant referee:
José María Sánchez Martínez (Spain)
Assistant video assistant referee:
Guillermo Cuadra Fernández (Spain)

=== Netherlands vs Portugal ===
13 July 2022
20:00

Netherlands	3–2	Portugal
Egurrola 7'; Van der Gragt 16'; Van de Donk 62'	Report	C. Costa 38' (pen.); Di. Silva 47'

Leigh Sports Village, Leigh
Attendance: 6,966
Referee: Ivana Martinčić (Croatia)

Netherlands	Portugal

GK	16	Daphne van Domselaar
RB	5	Lynn Wilms
CB	3	Stefanie van der Gragt
CB	20	Dominique Janssen	(yellow card) 37'
LB	19	Marisa Olislagers		(substituted off) 62'
CM	8	Sherida Spitse (c)
CM	6	Jill Roord	(yellow card) 88'
CM	21	Damaris Egurrola	(yellow card) 39'	(substituted off) 69'
RF	10	Daniëlle van de Donk
CF	7	Lineth Beerensteyn	(yellow card) 54'
LF	11	Lieke Martens		(substituted off) 83'
Substitutions:
DF	18	Kerstin Casparij		(substituted in) 62'
MF	12	Victoria Pelova		(substituted in) 69'
FW	22	Esmee Brugts		(substituted in) 83'
Manager:
(England) Mark Parsons

GK	1	Inês Pereira	(yellow card) 90+6'
RB	2	Catarina Amado	(yellow card) 17'
CB	19	Diana Gomes	(yellow card) 88'
CB	15	Carole Costa
LB	5	Joana Marchão		(substituted off) 65'
CM	8	Andreia Norton
CM	14	Dolores Silva (c)		(substituted off) 65'
CM	11	Tatiana Pinto		(substituted off) 86'
RF	9	Ana Borges
CF	10	Jéssica Silva
LF	16	Diana Silva		(substituted off) 86'
Substitutions:
MF	13	Fátima Pinto		(substituted in) 65'
MF	20	Francisca Nazareth		(substituted in) 65'
MF	7	Vanessa Marques		(substituted in) 86'
FW	18	Carolina Mendes		(substituted in) 86'
Manager:
Francisco Neto

Player of the Match:
Damaris Egurrola (Netherlands)

Assistant referees:
Sanja Rođak-Karšić (Croatia)
Staša Špur (Slovenia)
Fourth official:
Lorraine Watson (Scotland)
Video assistant referee:
Paolo Valeri (Italy)
Assistant video assistant referee:
Maurizio Mariani (Italy)

=== Switzerland vs Netherlands ===
17 July 2022
17:00

Switzerland	1–4	Netherlands
Reuteler 53'	Report	Crnogorčević 49' (o.g.); Leuchter 84', 90+5'; Pelova 89'

Bramall Lane, Sheffield
Attendance: 22,596
Referee: Iuliana Demetrescu (Romania)

Switzerland	Netherlands

GK	1	Gaëlle Thalmann
RB	5	Noelle Maritz
CB	18	Viola Calligaris
CB	15	Luana Bühler	(substituted off) 58'
LB	19	Eseosa Aigbogun	(substituted off) 58'
CM	13	Lia Wälti (c)	(substituted off) 83'
CM	8	Sandy Maendly	(substituted off) 58'
RW	9	Ana-Maria Crnogorčević
AM	11	Coumba Sow	(substituted off) 72'
LW	6	Géraldine Reuteler
CF	10	Ramona Bachmann
Substitutions:
DF	14	Rahel Kiwic	(substituted in) 58'
FW	17	Svenja Fölmli	(substituted in) 58'
DF	2	Julia Stierli	(substituted in) 58'
MF	7	Riola Xhemaili	(substituted in) 72'
MF	16	Sandrine Mauron	(substituted in) 83'
Manager:
(Denmark) Nils Nielsen

GK	16	Daphne van Domselaar
RB	5	Lynn Wilms
CB	3	Stefanie van der Gragt
CB	2	Aniek Nouwen	(substituted off) 64'
LB	20	Dominique Janssen
CM	14	Jackie Groenen
CM	6	Jill Roord	(substituted off) 64'
CM	8	Sherida Spitse (c)
RF	10	Daniëlle van de Donk	(substituted off) 90+6'
CF	7	Lineth Beerensteyn	(substituted off) 74'
LF	11	Lieke Martens	(substituted off) 74'
Substitutions:
DF	18	Kerstin Casparij	(substituted in) 64'
MF	12	Victoria Pelova	(substituted in) 64'
FW	22	Esmee Brugts	(substituted in) 74'
FW	17	Romée Leuchter	(substituted in) 74'
MF	21	Damaris Egurrola	(substituted in) 90+6'
Manager:
(England) Mark Parsons

Player of the Match:
Sherida Spitse (Netherlands)

Assistant referees:
Petruța Iugulescu (Romania)
Anita Vad (Hungary)
Fourth official:
Lorraine Watson (Scotland)
Video assistant referee:
Maurizio Mariani (Italy)
Assistant video assistant referee:
Paolo Valeri (Italy)

=== Sweden vs Portugal ===
17 July 2022
17:00

Sweden	5–0	Portugal
Angeldahl 21', 45'; C. Costa 45+7' (o.g.); Asllani 54' (pen.); Blackstenius 90+1'	Report

Leigh Sports Village, Leigh
Attendance: 7,118
Referee: Stéphanie Frappart (France)

Sweden	Portugal

GK	1	Hedvig Lindahl
RB	4	Hanna Glas
CB	13	Amanda Ilestedt
CB	6	Magdalena Eriksson	(yellow card) 18'	(substituted off) 54'
LB	2	Jonna Andersson
CM	16	Filippa Angeldahl		(substituted off) 70'
CM	9	Kosovare Asllani (c)
CM	14	Nathalie Björn		(substituted off) 78'
RF	19	Johanna Rytting Kaneryd	(yellow card) 30'	(substituted off) 54'
CF	11	Stina Blackstenius
LF	18	Fridolina Rolfö		(substituted off) 70'
Substitutions:
DF	3	Linda Sembrant		(substituted in) 54'
FW	22	Olivia Schough		(substituted in) 54'
FW	8	Lina Hurtig		(substituted in) 70'
MF	20	Hanna Bennison		(substituted in) 70'
MF	23	Elin Rubensson		(substituted in) 78'
Manager:
Peter Gerhardsson

GK	12	Patrícia Morais
RB	2	Catarina Amado		(substituted off) 35'
CB	19	Diana Gomes
CB	15	Carole Costa		(substituted off) 84'
LB	9	Ana Borges	(yellow card) 83'
CM	11	Tatiana Pinto
CM	14	Dolores Silva (c)		(substituted off) 57'
CM	8	Andreia Norton		(substituted off) 84'
RF	10	Jéssica Silva
CF	20	Francisca Nazareth		(substituted off) 57'
LF	16	Diana Silva
Substitutions:
DF	5	Joana Marchão		(substituted in) 35'
MF	13	Fátima Pinto		(substituted in) 57'
MF	21	Andreia Faria		(substituted in) 57'
DF	4	Sílvia Rebelo		(substituted in) 84'
FW	23	Telma Encarnação		(substituted in) 84'
Manager:
Francisco Neto

Player of the Match:
Kosovare Asllani (Sweden)

Assistant referees:
Élodie Coppola (France)
Manuela Nicolosi (France)
Fourth official:
Kateryna Monzul (Ukraine)
Video assistant referee:
Tomasz Kwiatkowski (Poland)
Assistant video assistant referee:
Bartosz Frankowski (Poland)

== Discipline ==
Fair play points will be used as tiebreakers in the group if the overall and head-to-head records of teams were tied. These are calculated based on yellow and red cards received in all group matches as follows:

- first yellow card: plus 1 point;
- indirect red card (second yellow card): plus 3 points;
- direct red card: plus 4 points;
- yellow card and direct red card: plus 5 points;

Team	Match 1				Match 2				Match 3				Points
Team	Booked	(yellow card) (yellow-red card)	Sent off (straight red)	(yellow card) (red card)	Booked	(yellow card) (yellow-red card)	Sent off (straight red)	(yellow card) (red card)	Booked	(yellow card) (yellow-red card)	Sent off (straight red)	(yellow card) (red card)	Points
Sweden									2				−2
Switzerland	3												−3
Netherlands					4								−4
Portugal					3				1				−4
