= Abbie Magee =

Northern Irish footballer (born 2000)

Personal information
- Date of birth: 15 November 2000 (age 25)
- Place of birth: Northern Ireland
- Positions: Defender; midfielder

Team information
- Current team: Cliftonville
- Number: 33

Senior career*
Years	Team	Apps	(Gls)
2017–2022	Linfield	26	(4)
2022–	Cliftonville	21	(5)

International career^{‡}
2016–2017	Northern Ireland U-17	6	(1)
2017–2019	Northern Ireland U-19	12	(0)
2020–	Northern Ireland	6	(0)
- * Club domestic league appearances and goals as of 10 June 2023 ‡ National team caps and goals as of 23:05, 13 July 2022 (UTC)

Abbie Magee (born 15 November 2000) is a Northern Irish footballer who plays as a defender and midfielder for Cliftonville and the Northern Ireland national team.

== Playing career ==
Since 2017, Magee has played for Linfield in Northern Ireland's Women's Premiership, the top women's league in the country. During the 2019 season, she scored the game-winning goal against Sion Swifts Ladies on 18 April. She scored a goal against Cliftonville on 17 July, contributing to Linfield's 8–0 win.

In March 2022, Magee left Linfield and signed for Cliftonville.

=== International ===
Magee has represented Northern Ireland on the under-17, under-19, and senior national teams. At the age of 19, she made her debut for the Northern Ireland senior team in against Belarus on 27 October 2020, coming on as a substitute for Ashley Hutton. After making two appearances in wins against Belarus in the UEFA Women's Euro 2022 qualifying tournament, she was ruled out of play due to injury in late March 2021. Manager Kenny Shiels said of the disappointment, "at this moment in time she is our best player and this has been a hammer blow to her and to the team."

Magee was part of the squad that was called up to the UEFA Women's Euro 2022.

== Honours ==
with Linfield

- Women's Premiership: 2017, 2018, 2019, 2020 (runner-up)
- IFA Women's Challenge Cup: 2020 (runner-up), 2019 (runner-up), 2018 (runner-up)
- Women's Premiership League Cup: 2018
