= Marina Georgieva =

Austrian footballer

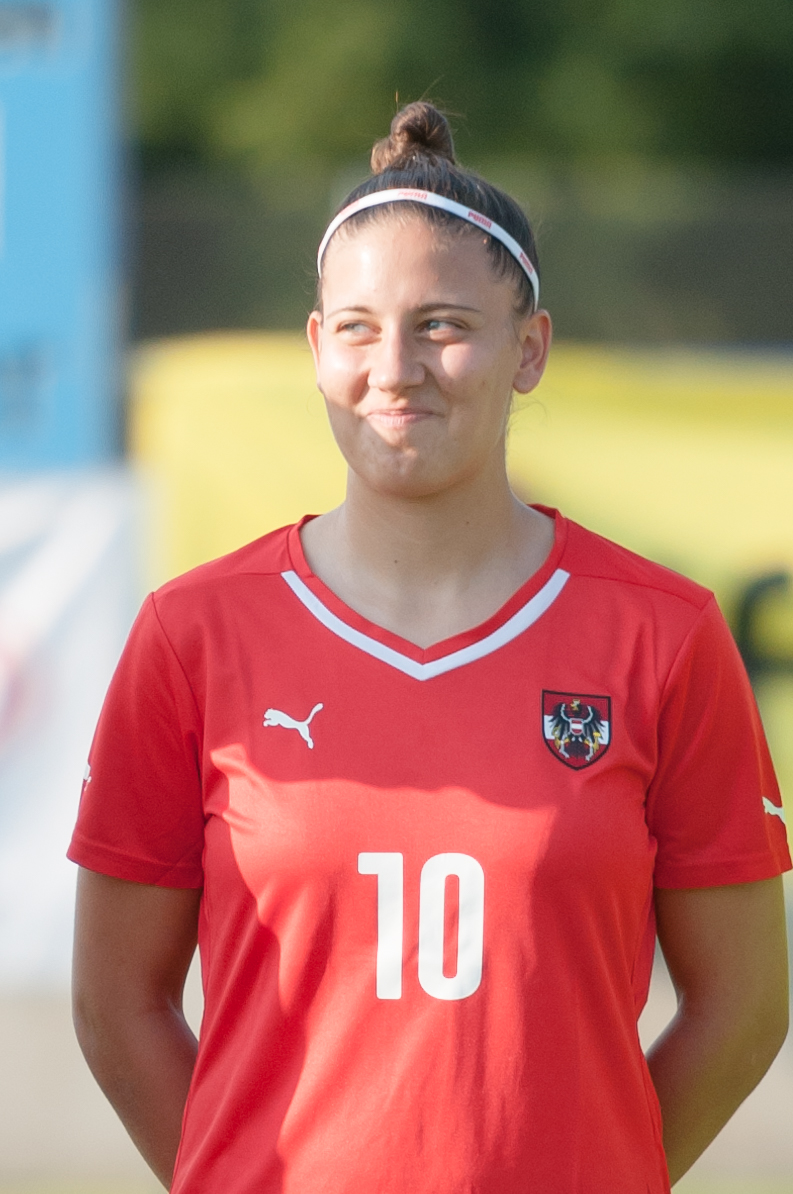
- Georgieva with Austria U19 in 2015

Personal information
- Full name: Marina Georgieva
- Date of birth: 13 April 1997 (age 29)
- Place of birth: Melk, Austria
- Height: 1.74 m (5 ft 9 in)
- Position: Defender

Team information
- Current team: FSV Mainz 05
- Number: 3

Youth career
- 2004–2010: FK Hainburg
- 2010–2012: ASK-BSC Bruck/Leitha

Senior career*
Years	Team	Apps	(Gls)
2012–2017	SKN St. Pölten II	33	(8)
2012–2017	SKN St. Pölten	37	(5)
2017–2018	1. FFC Turbine Potsdam II	26	(4)
2018	1. FFC Turbine Potsdam	0	(0)
2018–2022	SC Sand	55	(3)
2022–2023	Paris Saint-Germain	4	(0)
2023–2025	Fiorentina	38	(0)
2025–2026	1. FC Union Berlin	10	(0)
2026–	FSV Mainz 05	6	(0)

International career^{‡}
2013	Austria U17	9	(4)
2014–2016	Austria U19	24	(1)
2017–	Austria	46	(0)
- * Club domestic league appearances and goals as of 22 November 2026 ‡ National team caps and goals as of 20 May 2025

Marina Georgieva (Bulgarian: Марина Георгиева; born 13 April 1997) is an Austrian professional footballer who plays as a defender for Frauen-Bundesliga club 1. FSV Mainz 05 and the Austria national team.

== Club career ==
Georgieva began her career at FK Hainburg. In 2012 she moved to SKN St. Pölten, that were just promoted to the ÖFB-Frauenliga. In St. Pölten, she won the championship in 2015 and 2016 and also won the Austrian Cup three times.

In January 2017, Georgieva joined German club Turbine Potsdam. In June 2018, she moved to SC Sand.

On 11 August 2022, French club Paris Saint-Germain announced the signing of Georgieva on a two-year deal until June 2024.

On 28 July 2023, Georgieva left PSG by mutual consent and signed for Fiorentina. On 22 October, Georgieva was sent off after a second yellow card for Fiorentina in a 2–1 loss against Juventus.

In October 2025, Georgieva signed for German club 1. FC Union Berlin ahead of its first season following promotion to the Frauen-Bundesliga.

On 16 August 2026, Georgieva was signed by Frauen-Bundesliga newcomer 1. FSV Mainz 05.

== International career ==
Georgieva was part of the Austrian U-17 national team that competed at the 2014 UEFA Women's Under-17 Championship in England. She was also part of the Austrian U-19 national team that represented Austria at the 2016 UEFA Women's Under-19 Championship in Slovakia.

In 2017, Georgieva was part of the 23-woman squad that represented Austria and reached the semi-finals at the UEFA Women's Euro.

Georgieva was part of the squad that was called up to the UEFA Women's Euro 2022.

== Personal life ==
Born in Austria, Georgieva is of Bulgarian descent.

== Career statistics ==
=== International ===
As of match played 11 April 2023

Appearances and goals by national team and year
National team	Year	Apps	Goals
Austria	2017	1	0
Austria	2018	2	0
Austria	2019	0	0
Austria	2020	0	0
Austria	2021	6	0
Austria	2022	13	0
Austria	2023	4	0
Total		26	0
