= Nicole Billa =

Austrian footballer (born 1996)

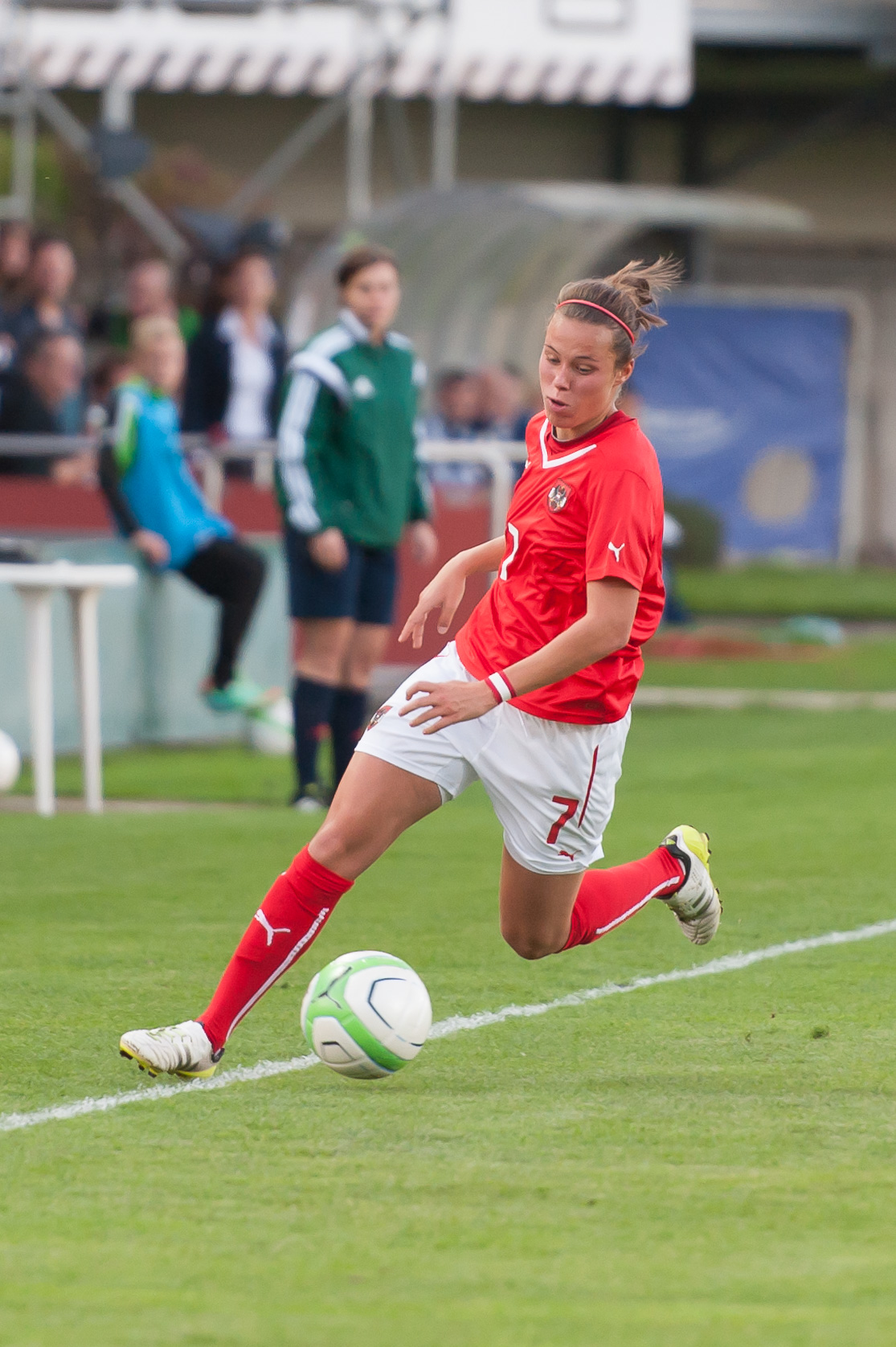
- Billa with Austria

Personal information
- Date of birth: 5 March 1996 (age 30)
- Place of birth: Kufstein, Austria
- Height: 1.68 m (5 ft 6 in)
- Position: Striker

Team information
- Current team: VfB Stuttgart
- Number: 26

Senior career*
Years	Team	Apps	(Gls)
2010–2013	FC Wacker Innsbruck	38	(37)
2013–2015	FSK St. Pölten-Spratzern	17	(24)
2015–2024	TSG Hoffenheim	185	(86)
2024–2025	1. FC Köln	18	(3)
2025–	VfB Stuttgart	37	(22)

International career^{‡}
2011–2013	Austria U17	9	(16)
2013–2014	Austria U19	6	(6)
2013–	Austria	111	(48)
- * Club domestic league appearances and goals as of 22 November 2026 ‡ National team caps and goals as of 14 October 2026

Nicole Billa (born 5 March 1996) is an Austrian footballer who plays as a striker for VfB Stuttgart. She won the Women's Footballer of the Year award in Germany in 2021.

== International career ==
Billa was part of the 23-women squad who represented Austria and reached the semi-finals at the UEFA Women's Euro 2017.

Billa was part of the squad that was called up to the UEFA Women's Euro 2022.

== Career statistics ==
Scores and results list Austria's goal tally first, score column indicates score after each Billa goal.

List of international goals scored by Nicole Billa
No.	Date	Venue	Opponent	Score	Result	Competition
1	19 June 2014	Tsentralny, Almaty, Kazakhstan	Kazakhstan	1–0	3–0	2015 FIFA Women's World Cup qualification
2	19 June 2014	Tsentralny, Almaty, Kazakhstan	Kazakhstan	3–0	3–0	2015 FIFA Women's World Cup qualification
3	17 September 2014	Waldstadion, Pasching, Austria	Kazakhstan	4–1	5–1	2015 FIFA Women's World Cup qualification
4	4 March 2015	Veli Jože, Poreč, Croatia	Slovakia	1–0	1–1	2015 Istria Cup
5	17 September 2015	Shymkent, Kazakhstan	Kazakhstan	1–0	2–0	UEFA Women's Euro 2017 qualifying
6	17 September 2015	Shymkent, Kazakhstan	Kazakhstan	2–0	2–0	UEFA Women's Euro 2017 qualifying
7	4 March 2016	GSZ Stadium, Larnaca, Cyprus	Hungary	2–1	2–1	2016 Cyprus Women's Cup
8	6 April 2016	Vorwärts Stadium, Steyr, Austria	Kazakhstan	2–0	6–1	UEFA Women's Euro 2017 qualifying
9	6 April 2016	Vorwärts Stadium, Steyr, Austria	Kazakhstan	6–1	6–1	UEFA Women's Euro 2017 qualifying
10	3 March 2017	GSP Stadium, Nicosia, Cyprus	New Zealand	1–0	3–0	2017 Cyprus Women's Cup
11	6 March 2017	GSZ Stadium, Larnaca, Cyprus	Scotland	1–1	1–3	2017 Cyprus Women's Cup
12	6 July 2017	Stadion Wiener Neustadt, Wiener Neustadt, Austria	Denmark	1–0	4–2	Friendly
13	6 July 2017	Stadion Wiener Neustadt, Wiener Neustadt, Austria	Denmark	2–1	4–2	Friendly
14	19 September 2017	Mladost Stadium, Kruševac, Serbia	Serbia	2–0	4–0	2019 FIFA Women's World Cup qualifying
15	12 June 2018	Ramat Gan Stadium, Ramat Gan, Israel	Israel	3–0	6–0	2019 FIFA Women's World Cup qualifying
16	4 September 2018	Stadion Wiener Neustadt, Wiener Neustadt, Austria	Finland	1–0	4–1	2019 FIFA Women's World Cup qualifying
17	4 September 2018	Stadion Wiener Neustadt, Wiener Neustadt, Austria	Finland	4–1	4–1	2019 FIFA Women's World Cup qualifying
18	6 October 2018	Stadion an der Hafenstraße, Essen, Germany	Germany	1–1	1–3	Friendly
19	27 February 2019	AEK Arena, Larnaca, Cyprus	Nigeria	2–0	4–1	2019 Cyprus Women's Cup
20	4 March 2019	AEK Arena, Larnaca, Cyprus	Slovakia	1–0	1–0	2019 Cyprus Women's Cup
21	8 October 2019	Čair Stadium, Niš, Serbia	Serbia	1–0	1–0	UEFA Women's Euro 2022 qualifying
22	8 November 2019	Toše Proeski Arena, Skopje, North Macedonia	North Macedonia	1–0	3–0	UEFA Women's Euro 2022 qualifying
23	12 November 2019	Bundesstadion Südstadt, Maria Enzersdorf, Austria	Kazakhstan	2–0	9–0	UEFA Women's Euro 2022 qualifying
24	12 November 2019	Bundesstadion Südstadt, Maria Enzersdorf, Austria	Kazakhstan	7–0	9–0	UEFA Women's Euro 2022 qualifying
25	12 November 2019	Bundesstadion Südstadt, Maria Enzersdorf, Austria	Kazakhstan	8–0	9–0	UEFA Women's Euro 2022 qualifying
26	22 September 2020	Namyz Stadium, Shymkent, Kazakhstan	Kazakhstan	5–0	5–0	UEFA Women's Euro 2022 qualifying
27	1 December 2020	CASHPOINT Arena, Altach, Austria	Serbia	1–0	1–0	UEFA Women's Euro 2022 qualifying
28	11 April 2021	Sonnenseestadion, Ritzing, Austria	Finland	1–0	2–2	Friendly
29	14 June 2021	Stadion Wiener Neustadt, Wiener Neustadt, Austria	Italy	1–1	2–3	Friendly
30	17 September 2021	Daugava Stadium, Liepāja, Latvia	Latvia	2–1	8–1	2023 FIFA Women's World Cup qualification
31	17 September 2021	Daugava Stadium, Liepāja, Latvia	Latvia	5–1	8–1	2023 FIFA Women's World Cup qualification
32	21 September 2021	Toše Proeski Arena, Skopje, North Macedonia	North Macedonia	2–0	6–0	2023 FIFA Women's World Cup qualification
33	21 September 2021	Toše Proeski Arena, Skopje, North Macedonia	North Macedonia	5–0	6–0	2023 FIFA Women's World Cup qualification
34	21 September 2021	Toše Proeski Arena, Skopje, North Macedonia	North Macedonia	6–0	6–0	2023 FIFA Women's World Cup qualification
35	22 October 2021	Stadion Wiener Neustadt, Wiener Neustadt, Austria	Luxembourg	1–0	5–0	2023 FIFA Women's World Cup qualification
36	22 October 2021	Stadion Wiener Neustadt, Wiener Neustadt, Austria	Luxembourg	3–0	5–0	2023 FIFA Women's World Cup qualification
37	30 November 2021	Stade de Luxembourg, Luxembourg City, Luxembourg	Luxembourg	7–0	8–0	2023 FIFA Women's World Cup qualification
38	20 February 2022	Marbella Football Center, Marbella, Spain	Romania	4–0	6–1	Friendly
39	20 February 2022	Marbella Football Center, Marbella, Spain	Romania	5–0	6–1	Friendly
40	23 February 2022	Marbella Football Center, Marbella, Spain	Switzerland	3–0	3–0	Friendly
41	8 April 2022	Stadion Wiener Neustadt, Wiener Neustadt, Austria	Northern Ireland	2–0	3–1	2023 FIFA Women's World Cup qualification
42	22 June 2022	Stadion Wiener Neustadt, Wiener Neustadt, Austria	Montenegro	3–0	4–0	Friendly
43	15 July 2022	American Express Stadium, Brighton and Hove, England	Norway	1–0	1–0	UEFA Women's Euro 2022
44	6 September 2022	Stadion Wiener Neustadt, Wiener Neustadt, Austria	North Macedonia	1–0	10–0	2023 FIFA Women's World Cup qualification
45	6 September 2022	Stadion Wiener Neustadt, Wiener Neustadt, Austria	North Macedonia	3–0	10–0	2023 FIFA Women's World Cup qualification
46	6 September 2022	Stadion Wiener Neustadt, Wiener Neustadt, Austria	North Macedonia	8–0	10–0	2023 FIFA Women's World Cup qualification
47	9 October 2026	Fadil Vokrri Stadium, Pristina, Kosovo	Kosovo	2–1	2–1	2027 FIFA Women's World Cup qualification

== Honours ==
FSK St. Pölten-Spratzern

- ÖFB-Frauenliga: 2014–15
- ÖFB Ladies Cup: 2013–14, 2014–15

== See also ==
- List of women's footballers with 100 or more international caps
