= Stefanie van der Gragt =

Dutch footballer (born 1992)

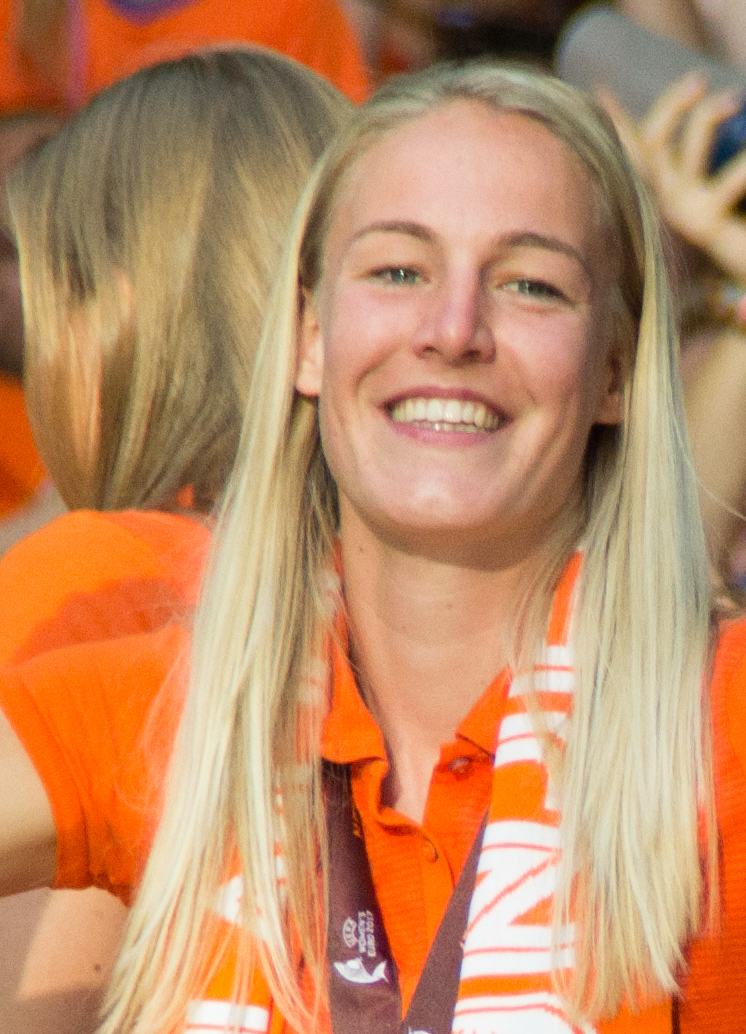
- Van der Gragt, 2017

Personal information
- Full name: Stefanie van der Gragt
- Date of birth: 16 August 1992 (age 34)
- Place of birth: Heerhugowaard, Netherlands
- Height: 1.78 m (5 ft 10 in)
- Position: Defender

Youth career
- Reiger Boys
- Kolping Boys

Senior career*
Years	Team	Apps	(Gls)
2009–2011	AZ	7	(1)
2011–2015	Telstar	86	(13)
2015–2016	Twente	21	(2)
2016–2017	Bayern Munich	9	(0)
2017–2018	Ajax	20	(3)
2018–2020	Barcelona	14	(2)
2020–2022	Ajax	36	(5)
2022–2023	Inter Milan	17	(3)
Total		210	(29)

International career
2006–2007	Netherlands U15	3	(0)
2008	Netherlands U16	4	(0)
2007–2009	Netherlands U17	15	(0)
2009–2010	Netherlands U19	14	(3)
2013–2023	Netherlands	107	(14)
Medal record
Women's football
Representing the Netherlands
FIFA Women's World Cup
Runner-up	2019 France
UEFA Women's Championship
Winner	2017 Netherlands
- * Club domestic league appearances and goals

Stefanie van der Gragt (Dutch pronunciation: [ˈsteːfaːni vɑn dər ˈɣrɑxt]; born 16 August 1992) is a Dutch former professional footballer who played as a defender for the Netherlands national team. She represented her country at the 2015 FIFA Women's World Cup and 2019 FIFA Women's World Cup.

== Club career ==
Her career started at the youth teams of amateur club Reiger Boys in Heerhugowaard. She then played for Kolping Boys youth team, another amateur club in Oudorp.

A move to AZ Alkmaar in 2009 started her professional career, as she was able to play in the highest professional national league (Eredivisie). After two seasons at the club, in 2011, she joined Telstar where she played for the next four years. In 2015 she moved to FC Twente and after one season she joined the German Bundesliga team Bayern Munich. Due to injuries, she had few opportunities to play in Germany and in 2017 she moved back to the Netherlands, signing with Ajax.

On 4 July 2018, she joined Spanish side FC Barcelona. On 12 June 2020, she moved back to join AFC Ajax. On 5 August 2022, Van der Gragt joined Italian club Inter Milan.

In April 2023 she announced her retirement after the 2023 World Cup to join back AZ Alkmaar as manager.

== International career ==
Her debut for the Netherlands women's national football team came on 8 March 2013 against Switzerland in a 2013 Cyprus Cup match.

She was also part of the Dutch teams of the 2015 FIFA Women's World Cup and the winning team of the UEFA Women's Euro 2017, playing all matches in both tournaments. After the 2017 tournament, the whole team was honoured by the Prime Minister Mark Rutte and Minister of Sport Edith Schippers and made Knights of the Order of Orange-Nassau.

At the 2019 FIFA Women's World Cup, she scored in the Netherlands' quarter-final victory over Italy.

On 31 May 2023, she was named as part of the Netherlands provisional squad for the 2023 FIFA Women's World Cup. She scored in the Netherlands' opening match of the tournament against Portugal which was the only goal of the match. It meant Van der Gragt scored in successive World Cups.

=== International goals ===
Scores and results list the Netherlands goal tally first.

G	Date	Venue	Opponent	Score	Result	Competition
1	5 March 2014	GSZ Stadium, Larnaca, Cyprus	Australia	2–0	2–2	2014 Cyprus Women's Cup
2	10 April 2016	Jan Louwers Stadion, Eindhoven, Netherlands	Canada	1–2	1–2	Friendly
3	20 January 2017	Pinatar Arena, San Pedro del Pinatar, Spain	Romania	4–1	7–1	Friendly
4	19 October 2017	NV Arena, Sankt Pölten, Austria	Austria	1–0	2–0	Friendly
5	24 November 2017	NTC Senec, Senec, Slovakia	Slovakia	1–0	5–0	2019 WC qualifying
6	24 November 2017	NTC Senec, Senec, Slovakia	Slovakia	5–0	5–0	2019 WC qualifying
7	28 February 2018	Bela Vista Municipal Stadium, Parchal, Portugal	Japan	5–1	6–2	2018 Algarve Cup
8	29 June 2019	Stade du Hainaut, Valenciennes, France	Italy	2–0	2–0	2019 FIFA Women's World Cup
9	3 September 2019	Abe Lenstra Stadion, Heerenveen	Turkey	1–0	3–0	UEFA Women's Euro 2022 qualifying
10	18 February 2021	Stade Roi Baudouin, Belgium	Belgium	3–1	6–1	Friendly
11	27 November 2021	Mestsky stadion, Ostrava	Czech Republic	2–2	2–2	2023 FIFA Women's World Cup qualifying
12	13 July 2022	Leigh Sports Village, Leigh, England	Portugal	2–0	3–2	UEFA Women's Euro 2022
13	23 July 2023	Forsyth Barr Stadium, Dunedin, New Zealand	Portugal	1–0	1–0	FIFA Women's World Cup 2023
14	11 August 2023	Wellington Regional Stadium, Wellington, New Zealand	Spain	1–1	1–2	FIFA Women's World Cup 2023

== Personal life ==
She had a daughter in 2020 and a son in 2023 with her girlfriend Maryze Borst.

== Honours ==
AZ Alkmaar

- Eredivisie: 2009–10
- KNVB Women's Cup: 2010–11

FC Twente

- Eredivisie: 2015–16

AFC Ajax

- Eredivisie: 2017–18
- KNVB Women's Cup: 2017–18, 2021–22

FC Barcelona

- Primera División: 2019–20
- UEFA Women's Champions League: runner-up, 2018–19
- Supercopa Femenina: 2020
- Copa Catalunya: 2018, 2019

Netherlands

- UEFA Women's Euro: 2017
- Algarve Cup: 2018
- FIFA Women's World Cup: Silver Medal 2019

Individual

- Knight of the Order of Orange-Nassau: 2017
