= Kelsie Burrows =

Northern Ireland footballer (born 2001)

Personal information
- Date of birth: 22 February 2001 (age 25)
- Place of birth: Northern Ireland
- Height: 1.68 m (5 ft 6 in)
- Position: Defender

Team information
- Current team: Cliftonville

Youth career
- Comber Rec.

Senior career*
Years	Team	Apps	(Gls)
2016–2019	Linfield	0	(0)
2019–2020	Blackburn Rovers	4	(0)
2020–2021	Linfield	0	(0)
2021–	Cliftonville	0	(0)

International career^{‡}
2016–2017	Northern Ireland U17	6	(0)
2019	Northern Ireland U18	1	(0)
2018–2019	Northern Ireland U19	9	(2)
2020–	Northern Ireland	8	(0)
- * Club domestic league appearances and goals as of 13:34, 4 October 2020 (UTC) ‡ National team caps and goals as of 23:00, 13 July 2022 (UTC)

Kelsie Burrows (born 22 February 2001) is a Northern Irish association footballer who plays as a defender for Cliftonville. She has also played for English FA Women's Championship club Blackburn Rovers LFC and the Northern Ireland women's national team.

== Club career ==
In September 2019 she left Northern Ireland to attend university in Preston, Lancashire, signing for nearby Blackburn Rovers of the FA Women's Championship. She returned to Linfield in February 2020. In June 2020 she modelled the club's new away kit.

== International career ==
Burrows was called up to the senior Northern Ireland squad for the first time in October 2019 for UEFA Women's Euro 2021 qualifying Group C fixtures with Norway and Wales. She made her senior international debut in a 1–0 defeat by Iceland on 4 March 2020, at the 2020 Pinatar Cup.

Burrows was part of the squad that was called up to the UEFA Women's Euro 2022.
