= UEFA Women's Euro 2022 =

International football championship

Tournament details
- Host country: England
- Dates: 6–31 July
- Teams: 16
- Venues: 10 (in 8 host cities)

Final positions
- Champions: England (1st title)
- Runners-up: Germany

Tournament statistics
- Matches played: 31
- Goals scored: 95 (3.06 per match)
- Attendance: 574,865 (18,544 per match)
- Top scorer(s): (England) Beth Mead (Germany) Alexandra Popp (6 goals each)
- Best player: (England) Beth Mead
- Best young player: (Germany) Lena Oberdorf

The 2022 UEFA European Women's Football Championship, commonly referred to as UEFA Women's Euro 2022 or simply Euro 2022, was the 13th edition of the UEFA Women's Championship, the quadrennial international football championship organised by UEFA for the women's national teams of Europe. It was the second edition since it was expanded to 16 teams. The tournament was hosted by England, and was originally scheduled to take place from 7 July to 1 August 2021. However, the COVID-19 pandemic in Europe in early 2020 resulted in postponements of the 2020 Summer Olympics and UEFA Euro 2020 to summer 2021, so the tournament was rescheduled for 6 to 31 July 2022 – unlike some other major tournaments which were similarly delayed, it was also re-titled. England last hosted the tournament in 2005, which had been the final tournament to feature just eight teams.

Defending champions Netherlands, who won UEFA Women's Euro 2017 as hosts, were eliminated in the quarter-finals by France. Hosts England won their first UEFA Women's Championship title by beating Germany 2–1 after extra time in the final, held at Wembley Stadium in London. As winners, they competed in the inaugural 2023 Women's Finalissima against Brazil, winners of the 2022 Copa América Femenina, claiming the title via a penalty shootout.

The video assistant referee (VAR), as well as goal-line technology, were used in the final tournament.

== Host selection ==
England were the only country to submit a bid before the deadline. Hungary and Austria had previously announced interest in submitting bids to host.^{:808} England were confirmed as hosts at the UEFA Executive Committee meeting in Dublin, Republic of Ireland, on 3 December 2018. They had previously hosted the Women's Euro in 2005, described as a watershed in terms of developing the sport, with stadium and television audiences having exceeded expectations.^{:800}

A January 2022 study debated the benefits of England hosting Euro 2022 in terms of sports tourism – though mainly for the men's game, England was already a global hub for football – or for the improvements major sporting events can bring to a host, as no new stadiums or infrastructure would be required in the nation; it suggested that the hosts "intended to leverage further the development of the women's game in England and enhance the country's image as one of the main hubs of women's football."^{:800}

== Qualification ==
Qualified for UEFA Women's Euro 2022 Did not qualify Did not enter Suspended by UEFA after initially qualifying

A total of 48 UEFA nations entered the competition (including Cyprus which entered for the first time at senior women's level, and Kosovo which entered their first Women's Euro), and with the hosts England qualifying automatically, the other 47 teams competed in the qualifying competition to determine the remaining 15 spots in the final tournament. In a change from previous qualifying competitions, the preliminary round had been abolished and all entrants started from the qualifying group stage. The qualifying competition consists of two rounds:

- Qualifying group stage: The 47 teams were drawn into nine groups: two groups of six teams and seven groups of five teams. Each group was played in home-and-away round-robin format. The nine group winners and the three best runners-up (not counting results against the sixth-placed team) qualified directly for the final tournament, while the remaining six runners-up advanced to the play-offs.
- Play-offs: The six teams were drawn into three ties to play home-and-away two-legged matches to determine the last three qualified teams.

The draw for the qualifying group stage was held on 21 February 2019 in Nyon. The qualifying group stage took place from August 2019 to December 2020, while the play-offs took place in April 2021, previously scheduled for October 2020.

=== Qualified teams ===
In February 2022, the Russian team was suspended following their country's invasion of Ukraine. UEFA later announced on 2 May 2022 that Russian teams were banned from every European competition, disqualifying Russia from the Women's Euro 2022. Portugal, whom Russia defeated in the play-offs, would take part instead.

14 of the 16 qualified teams had also taken part in the 2017 edition. Northern Ireland was the only team to make its debut at the 2022 finals. Finland meanwhile returned after missing the previous tournament. Scotland was the only team present in 2017 that failed to qualify for these finals apart from the banned Russia.

The following teams qualified for the final tournament.

Order	Team	Method of qualification	Date of qualification	Finals appearance	Last appearance	Previous best performance	FIFA ranking at start of draw
1	England	Hosts	3 December 2018	9th	2017	Runners-up (1984, 2009)	8th
2	Germany	Group I winners	23 October 2020	11th	2017	Champions (1989, 1991, 1995, 1997, 2001, 2005, 2009, 2013)	3rd
3	Netherlands	Group A winners	23 October 2020	4th	2017	Champions (2017)	4th
4	Denmark	Group B winners	27 October 2020	10th	2017	Runners-up (2017)	15th
5	Norway	Group C winners	27 October 2020	12th	2017	Champions (1987, 1993)	12th
6	Sweden	Group F winners	27 October 2020	11th	2017	Champions (1984)	2nd
7	France	Group G winners	27 November 2020	7th	2017	Quarter-finals (2009, 2013, 2017)	5th
8	Belgium	Group H winners	1 December 2020	2nd	2017	Group stage (2017)	19th
9	Iceland	Group F runners-up	1 December 2020	4th	2017	Quarter-finals (2013)	16th
10	Spain	Group D winners	18 February 2021	4th	2017	Semi-finals (1997)	10th
11	Finland	Group E winners	19 February 2021	4th	2013	Semi-finals (2005)	25th
12	Austria	Group G runners-up	23 February 2021	2nd	2017	Semi-finals (2017)	21st
13	Italy	Group B runners-up	24 February 2021	12th	2017	Runners-up (1993, 1997)	14th
–	~~Russia~~	~~qualifying play-offs winner~~	13 April 2021	~~5th~~	2017	Group stage (1997, 2001, 2009, 2013, 2017)	24th
14	Switzerland	qualifying play-offs winner	13 April 2021	2nd	2017	Group stage (2017)	20th
15	Northern Ireland	qualifying play-offs winner	13 April 2021	1st	—	Debut	48th
16	Portugal	qualifying play-offs lucky loser	2 May 2022	2nd	2017	Group stage (2017)	30th

Notes

1. The best three runners-up among all nine groups qualified directly for the final tournament.
2. Russia originally qualified by winning their play-off 1–0 on aggregate. However, Russia were suspended by FIFA and UEFA on 28 February 2022. UEFA replaced Russia with Portugal on 2 May 2022.

=== Final draw ===
The final draw took place in Manchester, England, on 28 October 2021 at 18:00 CEST.

It was originally set on 6 November 2020, but had been postponed due to the COVID-19 pandemic. The 16 teams were drawn into four groups of four teams. The hosts were assigned to position A1 in the draw while the other teams were seeded according to their coefficient ranking following the end of the qualifying stage, calculated based on the following:

- UEFA Women's Euro 2017 final tournament and qualifying competition (20%)
- 2019 FIFA Women's World Cup final tournament and qualifying competition (40%)
- UEFA Women's Euro 2022 qualifying competition (group stage only, excluding play-offs) (40%)

Pot 1
Team	Coeff	Rank
England ^{H}	41,443	3
Netherlands ^{TH}	43,961	1
Germany	41,924	2
France	40,898	4

Pot 2
Team	Coeff	Rank
Sweden	39,714	5
Spain	38,913	6
Norway	38,758	7
Italy	36,399	8

Pot 3
Team	Coeff	Rank
Denmark	35,265	9
Belgium	34,951	10
Switzerland	33,693	11
Austria	33,693	12

Pot 4
Team	Coeff	Rank
Iceland	33,458	13
Russia	30,117	15
Finland	29,765	16
Northern Ireland	19,526	27

- ^{H} Hosts (assigned to position A1 in the draw)
- ^{TH} Title holders

Notes

1. Russia were suspended by FIFA and UEFA on 28 February 2022, with Portugal being chosen by UEFA to take their place on 2 May 2022. This would not have affected the draw, since both teams would be placed in pot 4.

== Venues ==
Meadow Lane in Nottingham and London Road in Peterborough were initially included on the list of stadiums when the Football Association submitted the bid to host the tournament. These were changed with the City Ground in Nottingham and St Mary's in Southampton due to UEFA requirements. The City Ground was replaced by Leigh Sports Village when the final list of venues was confirmed in August 2019. On 23 February 2020, Old Trafford in Trafford (Greater Manchester) was confirmed as the venue of the opening match featuring England, with Wembley Stadium to host the final. For Euro 2022, UEFA announced 10 venues. For commercial reasons, Falmer Stadium changed its name for the tournament.

London (Wembley)	Manchester (Old Trafford)	Sheffield	Southampton
Wembley Stadium	Old Trafford	Bramall Lane	St Mary's Stadium
Capacity: 90,000	Capacity: 74,879	Capacity: 32,702	Capacity: 32,505
Brighton and Hove	UEFA Women's Euro 2022 is located in England		
Falmer Stadium (Community Stadium)	UEFA Women's Euro 2022 is located in England		
Capacity: 31,800	UEFA Women's Euro 2022 is located in England		
Milton Keynes	UEFA Women's Euro 2022 is located in England		
Stadium MK	UEFA Women's Euro 2022 is located in England		
Capacity: 30,500	UEFA Women's Euro 2022 is located in England		
London (Brentford)	Rotherham	Leigh	Manchester (Bradford)
Brentford Community Stadium	New York Stadium	Leigh Sports Village	Academy Stadium
Capacity: 17,250	Capacity: 12,021	Capacity: 7,800	Capacity: 4,400

The announcement of hosting plans in 2019 drew criticism from The Guardian, which noted that the bid had emphasised the use of Wembley Stadium, while the plan was only to use it for the final.^{:808} It and others also criticised that though the tournament would use stadiums in different parts of the country, none were in the North East.^{:808} This geographical concern was also a main subject of negative reactions on social media. A 2019 study noted that women's football had developed greatly following the 2005 Euro in the North West region in which it had been held, with a 2020 study noting that the North East was a prominent location for women's football.^{:811–812} A lack of stadiums chosen in the Midlands also saw criticism closer to the tournament.

Stadium size was also criticised, with major complaints coming from Iceland's Sara Björk Gunnarsdóttir; the 7,000 capacity Academy Stadium being the main focus, which would be limited to 4,700 capacity for the tournament due to UEFA restrictions preventing the use of standing capacity. The decision to include the stadium was labelled "embarrassing" and "disrespectful", and did not reflect the growth of women's football. The Leigh Sports Village would also be restricted to 8,100 instead of its typical 12,000 capacity due to the same restrictions.

== Match officials ==
On 19 April 2022, UEFA announced the selected match officials for the tournament. On 27 April, Belgian official Ella De Vries was added as an assistant VAR.

=== Referees ===
- (Croatia) Ivana Martinčić
- (Czech Republic) Jana Adámková
- (England) Rebecca Welch
- (Finland) Lina Lehtovaara
- (France) Stéphanie Frappart
- (Germany) Riem Hussein
- (Romania) Iuliana Demetrescu
- (Spain) Marta Huerta de Aza
- (Sweden) Tess Olofsson
- (Switzerland) Esther Staubli
- (Ukraine) Kateryna Monzul
- (Venezuela) Emikar Calderas
- (Wales) Cheryl Foster

=== Assistant referees ===
- (Austria) Sara Telek
- (Colombia) Mary Blanco Bolívar
- (Croatia) Sanja Rođak-Karšić
- (Cyprus) Polyxeni Irodotou
- (Czech Republic) Lucie Ratajová
- (England) Sian Massey-Ellis
- (England) Lisa Rashid
- (Estonia) Karolin Kaivoja
- (France) Élodie Coppola
- (France) Manuela Nicolosi
- (Germany) Katrin Rafalski
- (Greece) Chrysoula Kourompylia
- (Hungary) Anita Vad
- (Italy) Francesca Di Monte
- (Netherlands) Franca Overtoom
- (Poland) Paulina Baranowska
- (Republic of Ireland) Michelle O'Neill
- (Romania) Petruța Iugulescu
- (Slovakia) Mária Súkeníková
- (Slovenia) Staša Špur
- (Spain) Guadalupe Porras Ayuso
- (Sweden) Almira Spahić
- (Switzerland) Susanne Küng
- (Ukraine) Maryna Striletska
- (Venezuela) Migdalia Rodríguez Chirino

=== VARs ===
- (Belgium) Ella De Vries
- (England) Chris Kavanagh
- (France) Benoît Millot
- (France) Maïka Vanderstichel
- (Germany) Christian Dingert
- (Germany) Harm Osmers
- (Italy) Maurizio Mariani
- (Italy) Paolo Valeri
- (Netherlands) Pol van Boekel
- (Netherlands) Dennis Higler
- (Poland) Bartosz Frankowski
- (Poland) Tomasz Kwiatkowski
- (Portugal) Luís Godinho
- (Portugal) Tiago Martins
- (Spain) Guillermo Cuadra Fernández
- (Spain) José María Sánchez Martínez

=== Support officials ===
- (North Macedonia) Ivana Projkovska
- (Scotland) Lorraine Watson

== Squads ==
Each national team had to submit a squad of 23 players, three of whom must be goalkeepers. If a player was injured or ill severely enough to prevent her participation in the tournament before her team's first match, she could be replaced by another player.

== Group stage ==
Result of teams participating in UEFA Euro 2022: Winner Runner-up / Semi-finals Quarter-finals / Group stage

The provisional match schedule was confirmed by the UEFA Executive Committee during their meeting in Nyon, Switzerland on 4 December 2019.

The final match schedule was confirmed by the UEFA on 2 May 2022.

The group winners and runners-up advanced to the quarter-finals.

Tiebreakers

In the group stage, teams were ranked according to points (3 points for a win, 1 point for a draw, 0 points for a loss), and if tied on points, the following tiebreaking criteria were applied, in the order given, to determine the rankings (Regulations Articles 18.01 and 18.02):

1. Points in head-to-head matches among tied teams;
2. Goal difference in head-to-head matches among tied teams;
3. Goals scored in head-to-head matches among tied teams;
4. If more than two teams are tied, and after applying all head-to-head criteria above, a subset of teams are still tied, all head-to-head criteria above are reapplied exclusively to this subset of teams;
5. Goal difference in all group matches;
6. Goals scored in all group matches;
7. [Lower disciplinary points (red card = 3 points, yellow card = 1 point, expulsion for two yellow cards in one match = 3 points);
8. UEFA coefficient ranking for the final draw.

However, these criteria would not apply if two teams tied on points, goal difference and goals scored drew against each other in their final group match, and no other team in the group finishes with the same number of points; in that case, the tie would be broken by a penalty shootout.

All times are local, BST (UTC+1).

=== Group A ===
Pos	Team	Pld	W	D	L	GF	GA	GD	Pts	Qualification
1	England (H)	3	3	0	0	14	0	+14	9	Advance to knockout stage
2	Austria	3	2	0	1	3	1	+2	6	Advance to knockout stage
3	Norway	3	1	0	2	4	10	−6	3	
4	Northern Ireland	3	0	0	3	1	11	−10	0	

Source: UEFA
(H) Hosts
6 July 2022
20:00

England	1–0	Austria
Mead 16'	Report

Old Trafford, Manchester
Attendance: 68,871
Referee: Marta Huerta de Aza (Spain)
7 July 2022
20:00

Norway	4–1	Northern Ireland
Blakstad 10'; Maanum 13'; Graham Hansen 31' (pen.); Reiten 54'	Report	Nelson 49'

St Mary's Stadium, Southampton
Attendance: 9,146
Referee: Lina Lehtovaara (Finland)

11 July 2022
17:00

Austria	2–0	Northern Ireland
Schiechtl 19'; Naschenweng 88'	Report

St Mary's Stadium, Southampton
Attendance: 9,268
Referee: Emikar Calderas (Venezuela)
11 July 2022
20:00

England	8–0	Norway
Stanway 12' (pen.); Hemp 15'; White 29', 41'; Mead 34', 38', 81'; Russo 66'	Report

Falmer Stadium, Brighton and Hove
Attendance: 28,847
Referee: Riem Hussein (Germany)

15 July 2022
20:00

Northern Ireland	0–5	England
	Report	Kirby 40'; Mead 44'; Russo 48', 53'; Burrows 76' (o.g.)

St Mary's Stadium, Southampton
Attendance: 30,785
Referee: Esther Staubli (Switzerland)
15 July 2022
20:00

Austria	1–0	Norway
Billa 37'	Report

Falmer Stadium, Brighton and Hove
Attendance: 12,667
Referee: Kateryna Monzul (Ukraine)

=== Group B ===
Pos	Team	Pld	W	D	L	GF	GA	GD	Pts	Qualification
1	Germany	3	3	0	0	9	0	+9	9	Advance to knockout stage
2	Spain	3	2	0	1	5	3	+2	6	Advance to knockout stage
3	Denmark	3	1	0	2	1	5	−4	3	
4	Finland	3	0	0	3	1	8	−7	0	

Source: UEFA
8 July 2022
17:00

Spain	4–1	Finland
Paredes 26'; Bonmatí 41'; L. García 75'; Caldentey 90+5' (pen.)	Report	Sällström 1'

Stadium MK, Milton Keynes
Attendance: 16,819
Referee: Kateryna Monzul (Ukraine)
8 July 2022
20:00

Germany	4–0	Denmark
Magull 21'; Schüller 57'; Lattwein 78'; Popp 86'	Report

Brentford Community Stadium, London
Attendance: 15,736
Referee: Esther Staubli (Switzerland)

12 July 2022
17:00

Denmark	1–0	Finland
Harder 72'	Report

Stadium MK, Milton Keynes
Attendance: 11,615
Referee: Iuliana Demetrescu (Romania)
12 July 2022
20:00

Germany	2–0	Spain
Bühl 3'; Popp 37'	Report

Brentford Community Stadium, London
Attendance: 16,037
Referee: Stéphanie Frappart (France)

16 July 2022
20:00

Finland	0–3	Germany
	Report	Kleinherne 40'; Popp 48'; Anyomi 63'

Stadium MK, Milton Keynes
Attendance: 20,721
Referee: Emikar Calderas (Venezuela)
16 July 2022
20:00

Denmark	0–1	Spain
	Report	Cardona 90'

Brentford Community Stadium, London
Attendance: 16,041
Referee: Rebecca Welch (England)

=== Group C ===
Pos	Team	Pld	W	D	L	GF	GA	GD	Pts	Qualification
1	Sweden	3	2	1	0	8	2	+6	7	Advance to knockout stage
2	Netherlands	3	2	1	0	8	4	+4	7	Advance to knockout stage
3	Switzerland	3	0	1	2	4	8	−4	1	
4	Portugal	3	0	1	2	4	10	−6	1	

Source: UEFA
9 July 2022
17:00

Portugal	2–2	Switzerland
Gomes 58'; J. Silva 65'	Report	Sow 2'; Kiwic 5'

Leigh Sports Village, Leigh
Attendance: 5,902
Referee: Jana Adámková (Czech Republic)
9 July 2022
20:00

Netherlands	1–1	Sweden
Roord 52'	Report	Andersson 35'

Bramall Lane, Sheffield
Attendance: 21,342
Referee: Cheryl Foster (Wales)

13 July 2022
17:00

Sweden	2–1	Switzerland
Rolfö 53'; Bennison 79'	Report	Bachmann 55'

Bramall Lane, Sheffield
Attendance: 12,914
Referee: Marta Huerta de Aza (Spain)
13 July 2022
20:00

Netherlands	3–2	Portugal
Egurrola 7'; Van der Gragt 16'; Van de Donk 62'	Report	C. Costa 38' (pen.); Di. Silva 47'

Leigh Sports Village, Leigh
Attendance: 6,966
Referee: Ivana Martinčić (Croatia)

17 July 2022
17:00

Switzerland	1–4	Netherlands
Reuteler 53'	Report	Crnogorčević 49' (o.g.); Leuchter 84', 90+5'; Pelova 89'

Bramall Lane, Sheffield
Attendance: 22,596
Referee: Iuliana Demetrescu (Romania)
17 July 2022
17:00

Sweden	5–0	Portugal
Angeldahl 21', 45'; C. Costa 45+7' (o.g.); Asllani 54' (pen.); Blackstenius 90+1'	Report

Leigh Sports Village, Leigh
Attendance: 7,118
Referee: Stéphanie Frappart (France)

=== Group D ===
Pos	Team	Pld	W	D	L	GF	GA	GD	Pts	Qualification
1	France	3	2	1	0	8	3	+5	7	Advance to knockout stage
2	Belgium	3	1	1	1	3	3	0	4	Advance to knockout stage
3	Iceland	3	0	3	0	3	3	0	3	
4	Italy	3	0	1	2	2	7	−5	1	

Source: UEFA
10 July 2022
17:00

Belgium	1–1	Iceland
Vanhaevermaet 67' (pen.)	Report	Þorvaldsdóttir 50'

Academy Stadium, Manchester
Attendance: 3,859
Referee: Tess Olofsson (Sweden)
10 July 2022
20:00

France	5–1	Italy
Geyoro 9', 40', 45'; Katoto 12'; Cascarino 38'	Report	Piemonte 76'

New York Stadium, Rotherham
Attendance: 8,541
Referee: Rebecca Welch (England)

14 July 2022
17:00

Italy	1–1	Iceland
Bergamaschi 62'	Report	Vilhjálmsdóttir 3'

Academy Stadium, Manchester
Attendance: 4,029
Referee: Lina Lehtovaara (Finland)
14 July 2022
20:00

France	2–1	Belgium
Diani 6'; Mbock Bathy 41'	Report	Cayman 36'

New York Stadium, Rotherham
Attendance: 8,173
Referee: Cheryl Foster (Wales)

18 July 2022
20:00

Iceland	1–1	France
Brynjarsdóttir 90+12' (pen.)	Report	Malard 1'

New York Stadium, Rotherham
Attendance: 7,392
Referee: Jana Adámková (Czech Republic)
18 July 2022
20:00

Italy	0–1	Belgium
	Report	De Caigny 49'

Academy Stadium, Manchester
Attendance: 3,919
Referee: Ivana Martinčić (Croatia)

== Knockout stage ==
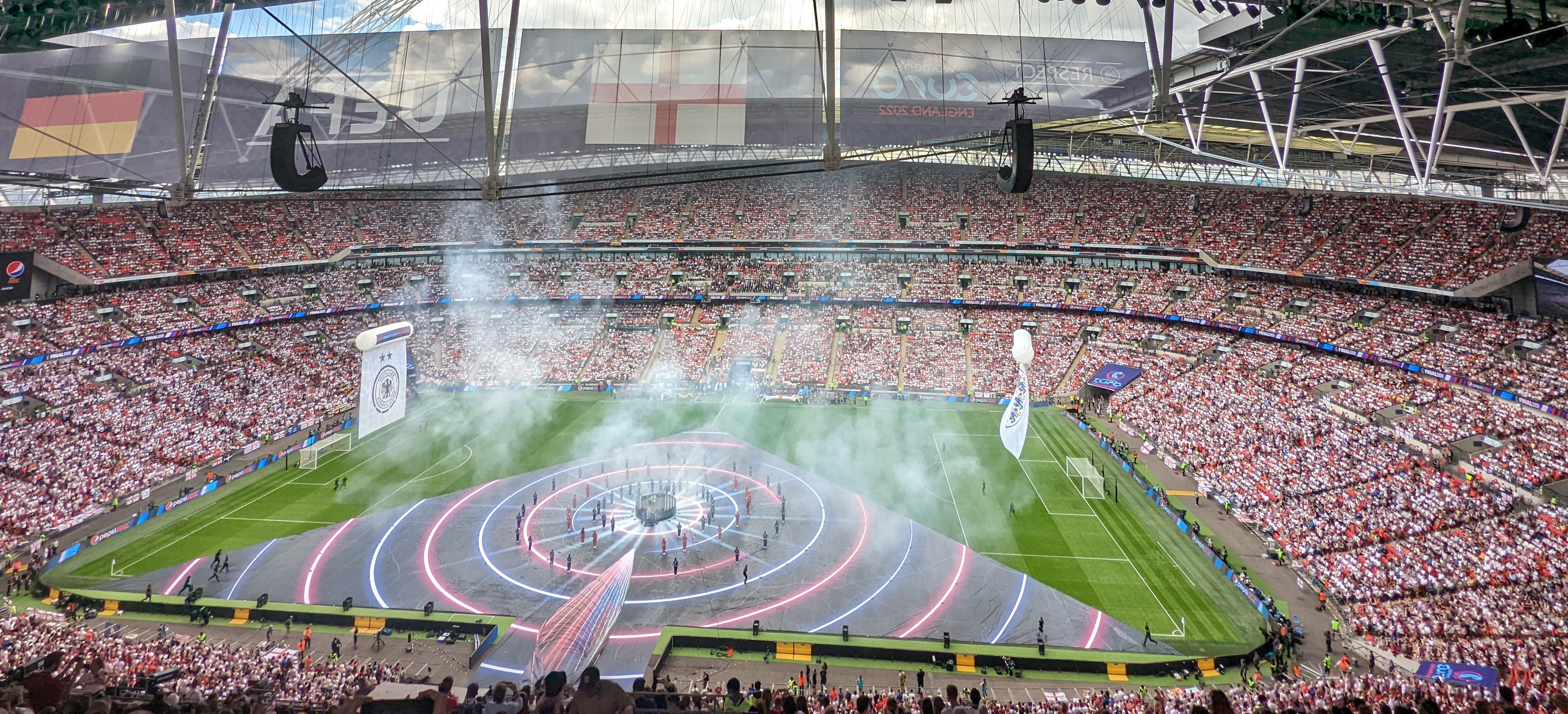
UEFA Women's Euro 2022 Final: England against Germany

In the knockout stage, extra time and a penalty shoot-out were used to decide the winner if necessary.

=== Bracket ===
Quarter-finals
20 July – Brighton and Hove
England (a.e.t.)	2
Spain	1
22 July – Leigh
Sweden	1
Belgium	0
21 July – London (BCS)
Germany	2
Austria	0
23 July – Rotherham
France (a.e.t.)	1
Netherlands	0

Semi-finals
26 July – Sheffield
England	4
Sweden	0
27 July – Milton Keynes
Germany	2
France	1

Final
31 July – London (WS)
England (a.e.t.)	2
Germany	1

=== Quarter-finals ===
20 July 2022
20:00

England	2–1 (a.e.t.)	Spain
Toone 84'; Stanway 96'	Report	González 54'

Falmer Stadium, Brighton and Hove
Attendance: 28,994
Referee: Stéphanie Frappart (France)

21 July 2022
20:00

Germany	2–0	Austria
Magull 25'; Popp 90'	Report

Brentford Community Stadium, London
Attendance: 16,025
Referee: Rebecca Welch (England)

22 July 2022
20:00

Sweden	1–0	Belgium
Sembrant 90+2'	Report

Leigh Sports Village, Leigh
Attendance: 7,517
Referee: Kateryna Monzul (Ukraine)

23 July 2022
20:00

France	1–0 (a.e.t.)	Netherlands
Périsset 102' (pen.)	Report

New York Stadium, Rotherham
Attendance: 9,764
Referee: Ivana Martinčić (Croatia)

=== Semi-finals ===
26 July 2022
20:00

England	4–0	Sweden
Mead 34'; Bronze 48'; Russo 68'; Kirby 76'	Report

Bramall Lane, Sheffield
Attendance: 28,624
Referee: Esther Staubli (Switzerland)

27 July 2022
20:00

Germany	2–1	France
Popp 40', 76'	Report	Frohms 44' (o.g.)

Stadium MK, Milton Keynes
Attendance: 27,445
Referee: Cheryl Foster (Wales)

=== Final ===
31 July 2022
17:00

England	2–1 (a.e.t.)	Germany
Toone 62'; Kelly 110'	Report	Magull 79'

Wembley Stadium, London
Attendance: 87,192
Referee: Kateryna Monzul (Ukraine)

== Statistics ==
=== Goalscorers ===
There were 95 goals scored in 31 matches, for an average of 3.06 goals per match.

6 goals

- (England) Beth Mead
- (Germany) Alexandra Popp

4 goals

- (England) Alessia Russo

3 goals

- (France) Grace Geyoro
- (Germany) Lina Magull

2 goals

- (England) Fran Kirby
- (England) Georgia Stanway
- (England) Ella Toone
- (England) Ellen White
- (Netherlands) Romée Leuchter
- (Sweden) Filippa Angeldahl

1 goal

- (Austria) Nicole Billa
- (Austria) Katharina Naschenweng
- (Austria) Katharina Schiechtl
- (Belgium) Janice Cayman
- (Belgium) Tine De Caigny
- (Belgium) Justine Vanhaevermaet
- (Denmark) Pernille Harder
- (England) Lucy Bronze
- (England) Lauren Hemp
- (England) Chloe Kelly
- (Finland) Linda Sällström
- (France) Delphine Cascarino
- (France) Kadidiatou Diani
- (France) Marie-Antoinette Katoto
- (France) Melvine Malard
- (France) Griedge Mbock Bathy
- (France) Ève Périsset
- (Germany) Nicole Anyomi
- (Germany) Klara Bühl
- (Germany) Sophia Kleinherne
- (Germany) Lena Lattwein
- (Germany) Lea Schüller
- (Iceland) Dagný Brynjarsdóttir
- (Iceland) Berglind Björg Þorvaldsdóttir
- (Iceland) Karólína Lea Vilhjálmsdóttir
- (Italy) Valentina Bergamaschi
- (Italy) Martina Piemonte
- (Netherlands) Daniëlle van de Donk
- (Netherlands) Damaris Egurrola
- (Netherlands) Stefanie van der Gragt
- (Netherlands) Victoria Pelova
- (Netherlands) Jill Roord
- (Northern Ireland) Julie Nelson
- (Norway) Julie Blakstad
- (Norway) Caroline Graham Hansen
- (Norway) Frida Maanum
- (Norway) Guro Reiten
- (Portugal) Carole Costa
- (Portugal) Diana Gomes
- (Portugal) Diana Silva
- (Portugal) Jéssica Silva
- (Spain) Aitana Bonmatí
- (Spain) Mariona Caldentey
- (Spain) Marta Cardona
- (Spain) Lucía García
- (Spain) Esther González
- (Spain) Irene Paredes
- (Sweden) Jonna Andersson
- (Sweden) Kosovare Asllani
- (Sweden) Hanna Bennison
- (Sweden) Stina Blackstenius
- (Sweden) Fridolina Rolfö
- (Sweden) Linda Sembrant
- (Switzerland) Ramona Bachmann
- (Switzerland) Rahel Kiwic
- (Switzerland) Géraldine Reuteler
- (Switzerland) Coumba Sow

1 own goal

- (Germany) Merle Frohms (against France)
- (Northern Ireland) Kelsie Burrows (against England)
- (Portugal) Carole Costa (against Sweden)
- (Switzerland) Ana-Maria Crnogorčević (against Netherlands)

=== Awards ===

UEFA Team of the Tournament

UEFA Team of the Tournament

UEFA's technical observer team was given the objective of naming a team of the best eleven players from the tournament. Four players from the winning England squad were named in the team as well as five from runners-up Germany.

Goalkeeper	Defenders	Midfielders	Forwards
(England) Mary Earps	(Germany) Giulia Gwinn (England) Leah Williamson (Germany) Marina Hegering (France) Sakina Karchaoui	(England) Keira Walsh (Germany) Lena Oberdorf (Spain) Aitana Bonmatí	(England) Beth Mead (Germany) Alexandra Popp (Germany) Klara Bühl

Player of the Tournament

The Player of the Tournament award was given to Beth Mead, who was chosen by UEFA's technical observers.

- (England) Beth Mead

Young Player of the Tournament

The Young Player of the Tournament award was open to players born on or after 1 January 1999. The inaugural award was given to Lena Oberdorf, as chosen by UEFA's technical observers.

- (Germany) Lena Oberdorf

Top Scorer

The top scorer award, sponsored by Grifols, was given to the top scorer in the tournament. Beth Mead won the award with six goals scored in the tournament. Though she finished level with Alexandra Popp on goals, Mead had more assists in the tournament. The ranking was determined using the following criteria: 1) goals, 2) assists, 3) fewest minutes played, 4) goals in qualifying.

Top scorer rankings
Rank	Player	Goals	Assists	Minutes
1st place, gold medalist(s)	(England) Beth Mead	6	5	450
2nd place, silver medalist(s)	(Germany) Alexandra Popp	6	0	361
3rd place, bronze medalist(s)	(England) Alessia Russo	4	1	265

Goal of the Tournament

The Goal of the Tournament was decided by UEFA's Technical Observer panel. On 5 August 2022, UEFA announced that England forward Alessia Russo's goal against Sweden had been named the goal of the tournament.

- (England) Alessia Russo (vs Sweden)

The Technical Observer panel ranked a list of the top ten goals of the tournament, five of which were scored by England. Two goals each from Russo and Germany's Alexandra Popp were included:

Top ten goals of the tournament
Rank	Player	Match	Goal
1st place, gold medalist(s)	(England) Alessia Russo	vs Sweden	3–0
2	(Germany) Alexandra Popp	vs France	2–1
3	(Netherlands) Daniëlle van de Donk	vs Portugal	3–2
4	(England) Beth Mead	vs Norway	5–0
5	(Spain) Aitana Bonmatí	vs Finland	2–1
6	(England) Fran Kirby	vs Northern Ireland	1–0
7	(England) Alessia Russo	vs Northern Ireland	4–0
8	(Sweden) Hanna Bennison	vs Switzerland	2–1
9	(Germany) Alexandra Popp	vs France	1–0
10	(England) Ella Toone ( (England) Keira Walsh assist)	vs Germany	1–0

Russo's goal against Sweden was also voted the Goal of the Tournament by fans on 5 August 2022; the top ten list was put to a fan vote, which produced a fan-voted top three. While the top goal selected by the Technical Observer panel was also voted the top goal by fans, the goals ranked tenth and ninth were voted as second and third by fans:

Fan vote top three goals of the tournament
Rank	Player	Match	Goal
1st place, gold medalist(s)	(England) Alessia Russo	vs Sweden	3–0
2	(England) Ella Toone ( (England) Keira Walsh assist)	vs Germany	1–0
3	(Germany) Alexandra Popp	vs France	1–0

=== Prize money ===
In September 2021, UEFA announced that the prize money for the UEFA Women's Euro 2022 championship will be €16 million, double the amount of the UEFA Women's Euro 2017 prize money.

The prize money distribution for the teams is:

- Qualification to the final series: €600,000
- Win a match in group stage: €100,000
- Draw a match in group stage: €50,000
- Reaching the quarter-final: €205,000
- Reaching the semi-final: €320,000
- Runner-up: €420,000
- Champions: €660,000

The prize money is cumulative; because champions England also won all three of their group matches, they received a total of €2,085,000.

== Marketing ==
=== Music ===
Music artist Joy Crookes was heavily involved in Euro 2022: she devised the story and took part in the announcement video for the England squad, and her song "Feet Don't Fail Me Now" was used as the title sequence music for the BBC's coverage of the tournament, accompanied by a video featuring Crookes and various players. "Feet Don't Fail Me Now" is also on the soundtrack of the videogame FIFA 22, and has been used as the title music for Sky's coverage of the Women's Super League (WSL) outside of Monday Night games.

=== Sponsors ===
The tournament involved campaigns with several of UEFA's sponsorship partners. Hisense launched a countdown campaign that focused on individual women's players to generate recognition, and during the tournament used social media to engage fans with clips from matches. Volkswagen created a campaign titled "Not Women's Football", to promote equality in the women's game. It also built on the popularity of its Tiny Football Car from (the men's) Euro 2020 with Tiny Buzz, a small remote-controlled model of the 2022 electric minivan. Tiny Buzz was painted in pride rainbow colours, something that Tiny Football Car was for the 2020 final and which proved popular, also showing the commitment to embracing the LGBT+ community in football. A social media account for Tiny Buzz was used throughout the tournament, giving the car a characteristic tone of voice to engage fans.

Official Global Sponsors	National Sponsors
Adidas; Booking.com; Euronics; Grifols; Heineken N.V.; Hisense; Hublot; Just Eat Takeaway.com; Nike, Inc.; PepsiCo; TikTok; Visa Inc.; Volkswagen	Gillette Venus; Lego; LinkedIn; Starling Bank

== Broadcasting ==
UEFA partnered with over 60 broadcasters, with the tournament able to be watched on UEFA TV's website in nations with no broadcast deal. Over 50 of the broadcasters had on-site productions, more than double that of the last edition of the Women's Euro. The tournament was watched live by over 365 million people in 195 territories.

=== Europe ===
Territory	Broadcaster	References
Albania	RTSH	
Armenia	AMPTV	
Austria	ORF	
Azerbaijan	ITV	
Belgium	RTBF; VRT	
Bosnia and Herzegovina	BHRT	
Bulgaria	BNT	
Croatia	HRT	
Cyprus	CyBC	
Czechia	ČT	
Denmark	DR; TV 2	
Estonia	ERR	
Finland	Yle	
France	TF1; Canal+	
Germany	ARD; ZDF; DAZN	
Greece	ERT	
Hungary	MTVA	
Iceland	RÚV	
Ireland	RTÉ	
Israel	IPBC	
Italy	RAI; Sky Sport	
Kazakhstan	Kazakh TV	
Kosovo	RTK	
Latvia	LTV	
Lithuania	LRT	
Malta	PBS	
Montenegro	RTCG	
Netherlands	NOS	
North Macedonia	MRT	
Norway	NRK; TV 2	
Poland	TVP	
Portugal	RTP; Canal 11	
Romania	TVR	
Russia	Match TV	
Serbia	RTS	
Slovakia	RTVS	
Slovenia	RTV	
Spain	RTVE	
Sweden	SVT; TV4; C More	
Switzerland	SRG SSR	
Turkey	TRT	
Ukraine	MGU	
United Kingdom	BBC	

=== Outside Europe ===
Country	Broadcaster	
Country	Free	Pay
Australia	—N/a	Optus Sport
China	China Central Television	Super Sports Shankai
United States	Univision (Spanish)	ESPN or ESPN +(English); TUDN (Spanish)
International*	UEFA.tv	—N/a
Latin America and the Caribbean	—N/a	ESPN and Star+
Middle East and North Africa	—N/a	beIN Sports
New Zealand	—N/a	Spark Sport
South Asia	—N/a	Sony Six
Sub-Saharan Africa	—N/a	W-Sport

* Only available in countries without broadcasting deals.

== Legacy ==
Effects of Euro 2022 seen before it was hosted include the creation of Manchester United W.F.C. and the investment of the BBC to begin broadcasting WSL games following the tournament.^{:813} The tournament was also used as an opportunity to highlight women's football. The National Football Museum held the first part of an exhibit on women's football history over the course of Euro 2022, among other endeavours to amplify women's voices in football, including collaborating with the Football Association (FA) on a heritage project, interviewing women including former Lionesses. England invested £3.1 million into related social impact programmes across the country, including the Euro 2022 roadshow, which travelled to ten cities and attracted over 35,000 visitors to learn about the history of women's football.

Upon both nations in the final having been decided, online betting had seen a record number of bets for women's football, with Bloomberg News writing that no matter which team took the title, women's football would be the winner. Behind the UK and Germany, the third-most online bets for the tournament were recorded in Brazil. The tournament achieved an estimated live viewership of around 365 million globally via all channels and fan engagement on social media saw related hashtags on Twitter and TikTok reach over a billion views each, marking successful growth in international popularity of and interactive elements of women's football.

Following the tournament, it was reported that a record 29,000 girls were set to compete in the National Cup in 2022–23, with the FA saying that England's victory was a factor in the popularity of women's football in the UK increasing so substantially afterwards. Media rights for women's football had increased by 289% compared to the previous Women's Euro.

England and UEFA rolled out a legacy programme ahead of the tournament, to run through 2024, in the host cities. By August 2022, a month after the conclusion of the tournament, the number of new participants in girls' and women's football was in the tens of thousands. Before this, the number of school-age girls in England dropping out of sports primarily due to societal reasons had been at a record high. In October 2022, UEFA reported that spectators of Euro 2022 were overwhelmingly likely to watch more women's football in future, and that the tournament had equally-significantly improved perceptions of women's football. Nearly three-quarters of residents in host cities felt that Euro 2022 had brought their communities closer, and millions of pounds sterling boosted local economies. Hundreds of thousands of opportunities in grassroots football in England were created, with some people saying that watching Euro 2022 encouraged them to be more active.

Dr Rachael Bullingham of the University of Gloucestershire opined that the positive image of the tournament and its numerous openly LGBT+ players would help with awareness of LGBT+ issues in sport and encourage more sportspeople to come out, as well as improving public attitudes towards homosexuality in general.

== See also ==
- UEFA Euro 1996
- UEFA Women's Euro 2005
