= Maryna Striletska =

Ukrainian association football referee (born 1983)

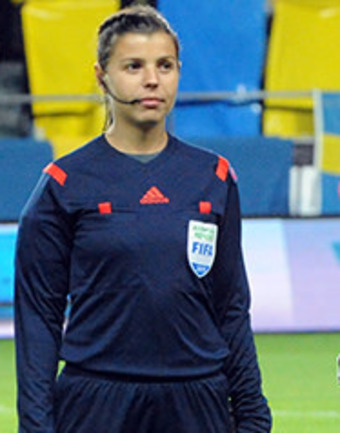
- Born: 22 August 1983 (age 43); Voroshilovgrad, Ukrainian SSR (now Luhansk, Ukraine)

Domestic
Years	League	Role
2012–2016	Ukrainian Second League	Assistant
2016–2022	Ukrainian First League	Assistant referee
2022–	Swiss Promotion League	Assistant

International
Years	League	Role
?–	FIFA listed	Assistant

Maryna Striletska (also transliterated Marina Streletskaya, Ukrainian: Марина Стрілецька, born 22 August 1983) is a Ukrainian association football referee. In 2020, she was part of the first all-women officiating team for a men's international match. Since 2022, she officiates in the Swiss Promotion League.

== Career ==
As a teenager, Striletska competed in athletics as well as football. In 2006, she started officiating in Ukraine; as of 2011, she was the only female referee in the Luhansk region. Striletska has worked as an international assistant referee under main official Kateryna Monzul, and has officiated at the FIFA Women's World Cup, UEFA Women's Championship, UEFA Women's Champions League and Olympic Games. She has also officiated in men's matches in the UEFA Europa League, UEFA Europa Conference League and the Ukrainian Premier League.

Striletska was an assistant referee for the 2014 UEFA Women's Champions League final. She was an assistant referee for one of the semi-finals of UEFA Women's Euro 2017. She was the reserve assistant referee for the 2018 UEFA Women's Champions League final. At the 2019 FIFA Women's World Cup, she was a video assistant referee for the group stage match between Brazil and Jamaica. She was the reserve assistant referee for the 2020 UEFA Women's Champions League final.

In 2020, Monzul, Striletska and Anastasia Romanyuk became the first all-women officiating team for a men's international match when they refereed a match between San Marino and Gibraltar. In December 2020, Monzul, Striletska and Oleksandra Ardasheva became the first all-women's officiating team in a men's UEFA match when they took charge of a UEFA Europa League match between K.A.A. Gent and FC Slovan Liberec. In 2021, she was an assistant referee in the 2020 Summer Olympics women's semi-final match between the United States and Canada. Later in 2021, Striletska was an assistant referee for the men's match between England and Andorra, alongside Monzul and Svitlana Grushko. It was the first time that a woman had officiated an England men's international match.

In March 2022, she started officiating in the Swiss Promotion League. In May 2022, she officiated a charity match between FC Basel and FC Dynamo Kyiv. Later in the year, she was chosen as an official for UEFA Women's Euro 2022; she was later an assistant referee for the tournament's final.

Striletska was chosen as an assistant referee for the 2023 FIFA Women's World Cup.

== Personal life ==
Striletska was born Luhansk which at that time was called Voroshilovgrad, Ukraine SSR (now Ukraine). Her paternal family are from Siberia, Russia. Her husband Sergei Streletsky is also a referee. In 2011, Striletska gave birth to a daughter. After the 2022 Russian invasion of Ukraine, Striletska fled to Switzerland, as her sister was working as an author in Basel.
