= Emikar Calderas =

Venezuelan football referee (born 1990)

- Full name: Emikar Virginia Calderas Barrera
- Born: 3 January 1990 (age 36)

Domestic
Years	League	Role
2016–	Primera División	Referee

International
Years	League	Role
2016–	FIFA listed	Referee

Emikar Virginia Calderas Barrera (born 3 January 1990) is a Venezuelan international football referee. She has been an international football referee since 2016. Calderas is a referee in the Primera División.

Calderas has been a referee since 2010. She started at the grassroots level for Venezuelan clubs, before moving up to the third division, then to the Segunda B, before finally making it to the first division (Primera División) in 2016. Calderas was a referee at the UEFA Women's Euro 2022 in England. She was the only referee at the tournament from outside of Europe. A year later, Calderas was selected as one of the referees for the FIFA Women's World Cup 2023 in Australia and New Zealand.
