= Marta Huerta de Aza =

Spanish football referee (born 1990)

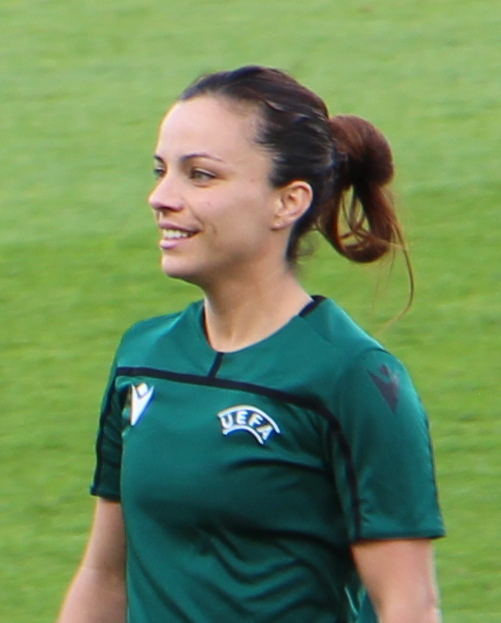
- Born: 31 March 1990 (age 36); Palencia, Spain

International
Years	League	Role
2016–	FIFA listed	Referee

Marta Huerta de Aza (born 31 March 1990) is a Spanish teacher and football referee. She received the Vicente Acevedo Trophy for best referee in the 2017–18 Primera División of women's football. In 2021, she was the first woman to be the fourth official in a men's La Liga match. In 2024, she became the first woman to referee in men's Segunda División, and won the Guruceta Trophy for best referee of the 2024–25 season.

== Career ==
Huerta de Aza became interested in becoming a referee after she attended a course when she was fifteen. She works as a teacher and because she is not considered an elite athlete in the Canary Islands, she has to juggle her part-time teaching with her commitments as a referee.

Huerta de Aza has been a FIFA international match referee since 2016. In 2017, she refereed her first Primera División game. She was awarded the Vicente Acevedo Trophy as the best Primera División referee in for the 2017-18 season. On 9 February 2020, she refereed the 2020 Supercopa de España Femenina final between Real Sociedad and FC Barcelona at the Helmántico Stadium in Salamanca, which Barcelona won 10-1.

On 3 October 2021, Huerta de Aza officiated her first La Liga game as the fourth official for the match between Getafe and Real Sociedad. She became the first woman to serve as the fourth official in the top men's division.

In May 2022, Huerta de Aza refereed the UEFA Women's Champions League quarterfinal match between Bayern Munich and PSG. She refereed the UEFA Women's Euro 2022 football match between England and Austria on 6 July 2022.

On 9 January 2023, FIFA appointed Huerta de Aza and Guadalupe Porras Ayuso to the officiating pool for the 2023 FIFA Women's World Cup in Australia and New Zealand. On 28, July 2023, Huerta de Aza refereed a Women's World Cup match between Haiti and China, where she controversially overturned a late penalty that had been awarded to Haiti. China would go on to win the match 1–0.

In June 2024, Huerta de Aza was promoted to Segunda División, becoming the first woman to officiate a professional match in Spain. She made her debut on 18 August 2024. For the 2024–25 Segunda División season, she was awarded the Guruceta Trophy for best referee in the league, becoming the first woman to win the trophy.

== Personal life ==
Huerta de Aza was born in Palencia and lives in the Canary Islands. She is married and has a daughter who was born in 2021.
