= Paolo Valeri =

Italian football referee (born 1978)

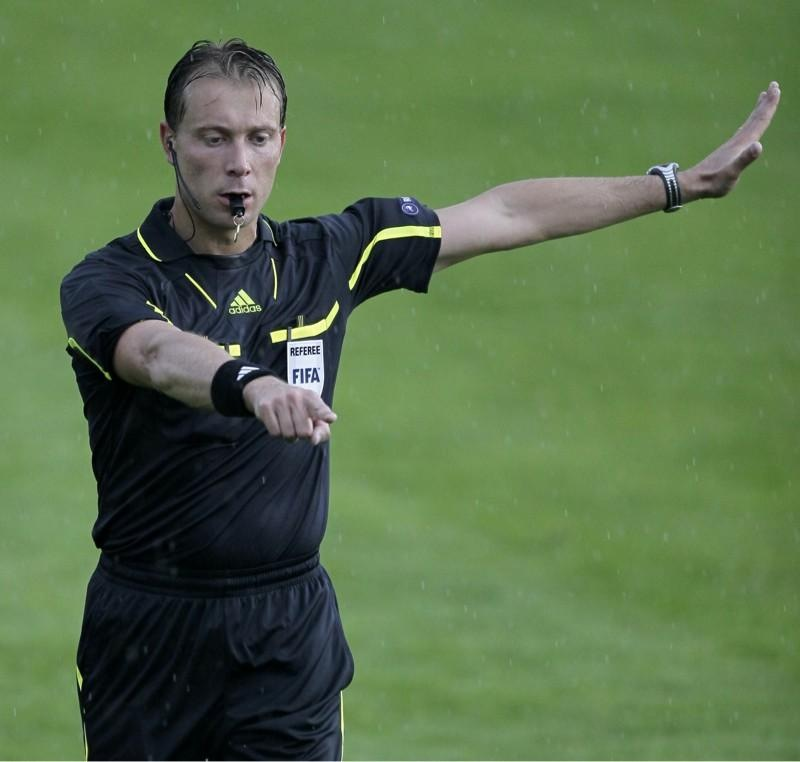
- Born: 16 May 1978 (age 48); Rome, Italy

Domestic
Years	League	Role
2007–2010	Serie B	Referee
2007–	Serie A	Referee

International
Years	League	Role
2011–	FIFA listed	Referee

Paolo Valeri (born 16 May 1978) is an Italian football referee, appointed by FIFA as an international referee on 1 January 2011.
