= 2023 FIFA Women's World Cup qualification – UEFA Group D =

UEFA Group D of the 2023 FIFA Women's World Cup qualification competition consisted of six teams: England, Austria, Northern Ireland, North Macedonia, Latvia, and Luxembourg. The composition of the nine groups in the qualifying group stage was decided by the draw held on 30 April 2021, with the teams seeded according to their coefficient ranking.

The group was played in home-and-away round-robin format between 17 September 2021 and 6 September 2022, with a pause for the Women's Euro 2022 in July. The group winners qualified for the final tournament, while the runners-up advanced to the play-offs first round if they were one of the other six runners-up among all nine groups (not counting results against the sixth-placed team).

== Standings ==
Pos	Team	Pld	W	D	L	GF	GA	GD	Pts	Qualification	(England)	(Austria)	(Northern Ireland)	(Luxembourg)	(North Macedonia)	(Latvia)
1	England	10	10	0	0	80	0	+80	30	2023 FIFA Women's World Cup	—	1–0	4–0	10–0	8–0	20–0
2	Austria	10	7	1	2	50	7	+43	22	Play-offs	0–2	—	3–1	5–0	10–0	8–0
3	Northern Ireland	10	6	1	3	36	16	+20	19		0–5	2–2	—	4–0	9–0	4–0
4	Luxembourg	10	3	0	7	9	45	−36	9		0–10	0–8	1–2	—	2–1	3–2
5	North Macedonia	10	2	0	8	10	62	−52	6		0–10	0–6	0–11	2–3	—	3–2
6	Latvia	10	1	0	9	8	63	−55	3		0–10	1–8	1–3	1–0	1–4	—

Source: UEFA
Rules for classification: Tiebreakers

== Matches ==
Times are CET/CEST, (Note: CEST (UTC+2) for dates between 28 March and 31 October 2021 and between 27 March and 30 October 2022, and CET (UTC+1) for all other dates.) as listed by UEFA (local times, if different, are in parentheses).

17 September 2021
16:00 (17:00 EEST)

Latvia	1–8	Austria
Zaičikova 12'	Report (FIFA); Report (UEFA)	Höbinger 17'; Billa 30', 79' (pen.); Dunst 61'; Voitāne 63' (o.g.); Feiersinger 86'; Wienerroither 88', 90+3'

Daugava Stadium, Liepāja
Attendance: 65
Referee: Triinu Laos (Estonia)
17 September 2021
20:00 (19:00 BST)

England	8–0	North Macedonia
Toone 13'; White 42', 67' (pen.); Zivikj 45' (o.g.); England 77', 90'; Kolarovska 79' (o.g.); Mead 90+1'	Report (FIFA); Report (UEFA)

St Mary's Stadium, Southampton
Attendance: 8,214
Referee: María Dolores Martinez Madrona (Spain)
17 September 2021
20:00 (19:00 BST)

Northern Ireland	4–0	Luxembourg
Callaghan 16'; Furness 23'; Wilson 41'; Wade 70'	Report (FIFA); Report (UEFA)

Inver Park, Larne
Attendance: 1,435
Referee: Eleni Antoniou (Greece)

21 September 2021
18:00

North Macedonia	0–6	Austria
	Report (FIFA); Report (UEFA)	Höbinger 12'; Billa 20' (pen.), 67', 71'; Hanshaw 37', 65'

Toše Proeski Arena, Skopje
Attendance: 258
Referee: Sara Persson (Sweden)
21 September 2021
20:00 (19:00 BST)

Northern Ireland	4–0	Latvia
McDaniel 48'; McGuinness 65'; Callaghan 78'; Furness 82' (pen.)	Report (FIFA); Report (UEFA)

Windsor Park, Belfast
Attendance: 4,079
Referee: Esther Staubli (Switzerland)
21 September 2021
20:15

Luxembourg	0–10	England
	Report (FIFA); Report (UEFA)	White 12', 17'; Parris 27'; Greenwood 37', 47'; Berscheid 62' (o.g.); Bright 79', 90+1'; Daly 90+3'; England 90+4'

Stade de Luxembourg, Luxembourg
Attendance: 1,262
Referee: Aleksandra Česen (Slovenia)

21 October 2021
17:00 (18:00 EEST)

Latvia	1–4	North Macedonia
Baļičeva 30'	Report (FIFA); Report (UEFA)	Rochi 9'; Andonova 28', 63' (pen.); Maksuti 51'

Daugava Stadium, Riga
Attendance: 0
Referee: Frederikke Lydia Søkjær (Denmark)
22 October 2021
18:00

Austria	5–0	Luxembourg
Billa 42', 50'; Naschenweng 45+2'; Enzinger 66'; Puntigam 84' (pen.)	Report (FIFA); Report (UEFA)

Stadion Wiener Neustadt, Wiener Neustadt
Attendance: 709
Referee: Zoe Stavrou (Cyprus)
23 October 2021
18:15 (17:15 BST)

England	4–0	Northern Ireland
Mead 64', 75', 78'; England 72'	Report (FIFA); Report (UEFA)

Wembley Stadium, London
Attendance: 23,225
Referee: Ivana Martinčić (Croatia)

26 October 2021
13:30

North Macedonia	2–3	Luxembourg
Rochi 21'; Nikolovska 90'	Report (FIFA); Report (UEFA)	Marques Abreu 8', 62'; Thill 67'

SRC Biljanini Izvori, Ohrid
Attendance: 145
Referee: Nadezhda Gorinova (Russia)
26 October 2021
19:30 (20:30 EET)

Latvia	0–10	England
	Report (FIFA); Report (UEFA)	Toone 8', 12', 68'; White 25'; Bright 32'; Mead 55'; Daly 70', 82'; Williamson 79'; Stanway 81'

Daugava Stadium, Riga
Attendance: 0
Referee: Katarzyna Lisiecka-sek (Poland)
26 October 2021
20:00 (19:00 GMT)

Northern Ireland	2–2	Austria
Wade 46'; Vance 50'	Report (FIFA); Report (UEFA)	Dunst 42'; Enzinger 90+2'

Seaview, Belfast
Attendance: 1951
Referee: Marta Huerta de Aza (Spain)

25 November 2021
13:00

North Macedonia	0–11	Northern Ireland
	Report (FIFA); Report (UEFA)	Furness 4', 16' (pen.), 68'; McKenna 10'; Magill 11', 42', 73', 90'; Wade 26'; McGuinnness 33'; Holloway 90+1'

Petar Miloševski Training Centre, Skopje
Attendance: 136
Referee: Franziska Wildfeuer (Germany)
27 November 2021
13:30 (12:30 GMT)

England	1–0	Austria
White 40'	Report (FIFA); Report (UEFA)

Stadium of Light, Sunderland
Attendance: 9,159
Referee: Kateryna Monzul (Ukraine)

29 November 2021
20:00 (19:00 GMT)

Northern Ireland	9–0	North Macedonia
McGuiness 11', 38', 62'; Holloway 30', 64'; Furness 36', 87'; Magill 74'; Beattie 90+3'	Report (FIFA); Report (UEFA)

Seaview, Belfast
Attendance: 2621
Referee: Meitar Shemesh (Israel)
30 November 2021
20:00 (19:00 GMT)

England	20–0	Latvia
Mead 3', 12', 23'; White 6', 9', 49'; Hemp 18', 44', 76', 88'; Toone 42'; Stanway 52' (pen.); Carter 56'; England 61', 84'; Scott 67'; Russo 71', 81', 82'; Nobbs 80'	Report (FIFA); Report (UEFA)

Keepmoat Stadium, Doncaster
Attendance: 10,402
Referee: Veronika Kovarova (Czech Republic)
30 November 2021
20:00

Luxembourg	0–8	Austria
	Report (FIFA); Report (UEFA)	Enzinger 16', 17', 23'; Billa 27', 62'; Dunst 48'; Höbinger 60'; Zadrazil 68'

Stade de Luxembourg, Luxembourg
Attendance: 719
Referee: Andromachi Tsiofliki (Greece)

8 April 2022
20:00

North Macedonia	0–10	England
	Report (FIFA); Report (UEFA)	Mead 6', 12', 47', 53'; Toone 24', 74', 78'; White 42'; Stanway 45', 56'

Toše Proeski Arena, Skopje
Attendance: 258
Referee: Vivian Peeters (Netherlands)
8 April 2022
20:30

Austria	3–1	Northern Ireland
Wenninger 48'; Billa 55'; Dunst 57'	Report (FIFA); Report (UEFA)	Andrews 85'

Stadion Wiener Neustadt, Wiener Neustadt
Attendance: 1,200
Referee: Stéphanie Frappart (France)
9 April 2022
11:00

Luxembourg	3–2	Latvia
Lourenco Magalhães 50'; Thompson 81', 90+5'	Report (FIFA); Report (UEFA)	Fedotova 29', 47'

Stade Municipal, Bettembourg
Attendance: 375
Referee: Franziska Wildfeuer (Germany)

12 April 2022
18:00

Luxembourg	2–1	North Macedonia
Thompson 28', 45+1'	Report (FIFA); Report (UEFA)	Rochi 1'

Stade Émile Mayrisch, Esch-sur-Alzette
Attendance: 554
Referee: Deborah Anex (Switzerland)
12 April 2022
19:00

Austria	8–0	Latvia
Puntigam 11' (pen.), 14'; Degen 16'; Schiechtl 58'; Plattner 64', 90+2'; Naschenweng 70'; Rožaščonoka 76' (o.g.)	Report (FIFA); Report (UEFA)

Stadion Wiener Neustadt, Wiener Neustadt
Attendance: 13,000
Referee: Zuzana Valentová (Slovakia)
12 April 2022
20:55 (19:55 BST)

Northern Ireland	0–5	England
	Report (FIFA); Report (UEFA)	Hemp 26', 60'; Toone 52'; Stanway 70', 79'

Windsor Park, Belfast
Attendance: 15,348
Referee: Riem Hussein (Germany)

24 June 2022
16:00 (17:00 EEST)

Latvia	1–0	Luxembourg
Treimane 64'	Report (FIFA); Report (UEFA)

Daugava Stadium, Riga
Attendance: 386
Referee: Kateryna Usova (Ukraine)

1 September 2022
16:00

North Macedonia	3–2	Latvia
Andonova 13', 17' (pen.); Rochi 72'	Report (FIFA); Report (UEFA)	Ročāne 5'; Ševcova 79'

Petar Miloševski Training Centre, Skopje
Attendance: 225
Referee: Michaliną Diakow (Poland)
2 September 2022
18:30

Luxembourg	1–2	Northern Ireland
Thompson 80'	Report (FIFA); Report (UEFA)	Robson 52'; McKenna 85'

Stade Émile Mayrisch, Esch-sur-Alzette
Attendance: 342
Referee: Jelena Pejković (Croatia)
3 September 2022
17:30

Austria	0–2	England
	Report (FIFA); Report (UEFA)	Russo 7'; Parris 69'

Stadion Wiener Neustadt, Wiener Neustadt
Attendance: 2,600
Referee: Iuliana Demetrescu (Romania)

6 September 2022
16:00 (17:00 EEST)

Latvia	1–3	Northern Ireland
Ročāne 27'	Report (FIFA); Report (UEFA)	Vaivode 36' (o.g.), 90+5' (o.g.); Luīze Lubiņa 89' (o.g.)

Sloka Stadium, Jūrmala
Referee: Katalin Sipos (Hungary)
6 September 2022
20:30 (19:30 BST)

England	10–0	Luxembourg
Stanway 12' (pen.), 26'; Russo 18'; Daly 38'; Mead 40'; England 48', 90+2'; Parris 59'; Toone 73' (pen.); Hemp 90'	Report (FIFA); Report (UEFA)

Stoke Ground, Stoke-on-Trent
Referee: Simona Ghisletta (Switzerland)
6 September 2022
20:30

Austria	10–0	North Macedonia
Billa 7', 34' (pen.), 66'; Zadrazil 28'; Wenninger 43'; Dunst 47'; Höbinger 50'; Feiersinger 61', 78'; Naschenweng 71'	Report (FIFA); Report (UEFA)

Stadion Wiener Neustadt, Wiener Neustadt
Referee: Frederikke Lydia Søkjær (Denmark)

== Goalscorers ==
There were 193 goals scored in 30 matches, for an average of 6.43 goals per match.

13 goals

- (Austria) Nicole Billa
- (England) Beth Mead

10 goals

- (England) Ella Toone
- (England) Ellen White

8 goals

- Bethany England
- (England) Georgia Stanway

7 goals

- (England) Lauren Hemp
- (Northern Ireland) Rachel Furness

5 goals

- (Austria) Barbara Dunst
- (Austria) Stefanie Enzinger
- (England) Alessia Russo
- (Luxembourg) Amy Thompson
- (Northern Ireland) Simone Magill
- (Northern Ireland) Kirsty McGuinness

4 goals

- (Austria) Marie Höbinger
- (England) Rachel Daly
- (North Macedonia) Nataša Andonova
- (North Macedonia) Gentjana Rochi

3 goals

- (Austria) Laura Feiersinger
- (Austria) Katharina Naschenweng
- (Austria) Sarah Puntigam
- (England) Millie Bright
- (England) Nikita Parris
- (Northern Ireland) Rebecca Holloway
- (Northern Ireland) Lauren Wade

2 goals

- (Austria) Verena Hanshaw
- (Austria) Maria Plattner
- (Austria) Carina Wenninger
- (Austria) Katja Wienerroither
- (Austria) Sarah Zadrazil
- (England) Alex Greenwood
- (Latvia) Renāte Fedotova
- (Latvia) Anastasija Ročāne
- (Luxembourg) Julie Marques Abreu
- (Northern Ireland) Marissa Callaghan
- (Northern Ireland) Rebecca McKenna

1 goal

- (Austria) Celina Degen
- (Austria) Katharina Schiechtl
- (England) Jess Carter
- (England) Jordan Nobbs
- (England) Jill Scott
- (England) Leah Williamson
- (Latvia) Tatjana Baļičeva
- (Latvia) Olga Ševcova
- (Latvia) Nelle Treimane
- (Latvia) Viktorija Zaičikova
- (Luxembourg) Joana Lourenco Magalhães
- (Luxembourg) Kate Thill
- (North Macedonia) Ulza Maksuti
- (North Macedonia) Pavlina Nikolovska
- (Northern Ireland) Joely Andrews
- (Northern Ireland) Kerry Beattie
- (Northern Ireland) Louise McDaniel
- (Northern Ireland) Sarah Robson
- (Northern Ireland) Demi Vance
- (Northern Ireland) Emily Wilson

1 own goal

- (Latvia) Arta Luīze Lubiņa (against Northern Ireland)
- (Latvia) Liāna Rožaščonoka (against Austria)
- (Latvia) Sandra Voitāne (against Austria)
- (Luxembourg) Jessica Berscheid (against England)
- (North Macedonia) Sara Kolarovska (against England)
- (North Macedonia) Julija Zivikj (against England)

2 own goals

- (Latvia) Enija Anna Vaivode (against Northern Ireland)
