= England women's national football team results (2020–present) =

- Win Draw Loss

This is a list of the England women's national football team results and scheduled fixtures from 2020 to the present.

== Results ==
=== 2020 ===
5 March 2020 2020 SheBelieves Cup	United States	2–0	England	Orlando, Florida
19:00 ET	Press 53'; Lloyd 55'	Report		Stadium: Exploria Stadium; Attendance: 16,531; Referee: Odette Hamilton (Jamaica)

8 March 2020 2020 SheBelieves Cup	Japan	0–1	England	Harrison, New Jersey
17:00 ET	Nakajima (yellow card) 54'; Sugita (yellow card) 61'	Report	Kelly (yellow card) 54'; White 83'	Stadium: Red Bull Arena; Attendance: 14,758; Referee: Katja Koroleva (United States)

11 March 2020 2020 SheBelieves Cup	England	0–1	Spain	Frisco, Texas
16:15 CT	Scott (yellow card) 72'; Williamson (yellow card) 78'	Report	Ouahabi (yellow card) 12'; Putellas 83'	Stadium: Toyota Stadium; Attendance: 10,507; Referee: Danielle Chesky (United States)

27 October 2020 Friendly	Germany	C–C	England	Wiesbaden, Germany
15:00		Report		Stadium: Brita-Arena
Note: Cancelled following positive COVID-19 test in the England camp

1 December 2020 Friendly	England	C–C	Norway	Sheffield, England
19:15		Report		Stadium: Bramall Lane
Note: Cancelled following COVID-19 travel restrictions imposed by Norway

=== 2021 ===
23 February 2021 Friendly	England	6–0	Northern Ireland	Burton upon Trent, England
12:30	White 18', 23', 49'; Bronze 29'; Daly 67'; Toone 75' (pen.)	Report	McKenna (yellow card) 90+4'	Stadium: St George's Park; Attendance: Behind-closed-doors; Referee: Lorraine Watson (Scotland)

9 April 2021 Friendly	France	3–1	England	Caen, France
21:10 CET (UTC+1)	Baltimore 32'; Palis (yellow card) 58'; Asseyi 63' (pen.); Torrent (yellow card) 77'; Katoto 82'	Report	Mead (yellow card) 17'; Kirby 79' (pen.); Daly (yellow card) 90'	Stadium: Stade Michel d'Ornano; Attendance: Behind-closed-doors; Referee: Sara Persson (Sweden)

13 April 2021 Friendly	England	0–2	Canada	Stoke-on-Trent, England
19:15		Report	Viens 3'; Zadorsky (yellow card) 28'; Prince 86'	Stadium: Stoke Ground; Attendance: Behind-closed-doors; Referee: Cheryl Foster (Wales)

17 September 2021 2023 World Cup qualifying	England	8–0	North Macedonia	Southampton, England
19:00	Toone 12'; White 42', 67' (pen.); Zivikj 45' (o.g.); England 77', 90'; Kolarovska 79' (o.g.); Mead 90+1'	Report	Zivikj (yellow card) 66'; Maksuti (yellow card) 68'	Stadium: St Mary's Stadium; Attendance: 8,214; Referee: María Martínez (Spain)

21 September 2021 2023 World Cup qualifying	Luxembourg	0–10	England	Luxembourg City, Luxembourg
20:15 CEST (UTC+2)	De Bruyn (yellow card) 83'	Report	White 12', 17'; Parris 27'; Greenwood 37', 47'; Berscheid 61' (o.g.); Mead (yellow card) 66'; Bright 78', 90+1'; Daly 90+3'; England 90+4'	Stadium: Stade de Luxembourg; Referee: Aleksandra Česen (Slovenia)

23 October 2021 2023 World Cup qualifying	England	4–0	Northern Ireland	London, England
17:15	Mead 64', 74', 78'; England 72'	Report	Burrows (yellow card) 60'	Stadium: Wembley Stadium; Attendance: 23,225; Referee: Ivana Martinčić (Croatia)

26 October 2021 2023 World Cup qualifying	Latvia	0–10	England	Riga, Latvia
20:30 EEST (UTC+3)		Report	Toone 8', 12', 68'; White 25'; Bright 32'; Mead 55'; Daly 70', 82'; Williamson 79'; Stanway 81'	Stadium: Daugava Stadium; Referee: Katarzyna Lisiecka-Sęk (Poland)

27 November 2021 2023 World Cup qualifying	England	1–0	Austria	Sunderland, England
12:30	White 39'	Report	Wienerroither (yellow card) 62'	Stadium: Stadium of Light; Attendance: 9,159; Referee: Kateryna Monzul (Ukraine)

30 November 2021 2023 World Cup qualifying	England	20–0	Latvia	Doncaster, England
19:00	Mead 3', 12', 23'; White 6', 9', 49'; Hemp 18', 44', 76', 88'; Toone 42'; Stanway 52' (pen.); Carter 56'; England 61', 84'; Scott 67'; Russo 71', 81', 82'; Nobbs 80'	Report	Tumāne (yellow card) 52'	Stadium: Keepmoat Stadium; Attendance: 10,402; Referee: Veronika Kovarova (Czech Republic)

=== 2022 ===
17 February 2022 2022 Arnold Clark Cup	England	1–1	Canada	Middlesbrough, England
19:30	Bright 22'	Report	Lawrence (yellow card) 48'; Beckie 55'; Buchanan (yellow card) 86'	Stadium: Riverside Stadium; Attendance: 8,769; Referee: Lina Lehtovaara (Finland)

20 February 2022 2022 Arnold Clark Cup	England	0–0	Spain	Norwich, England
15:15	Mead (yellow card) 48'; Stanway (yellow card) 66'	Report	Andrés (yellow card) 32'	Stadium: Carrow Road; Attendance: 14,284; Referee: Iuliana Demetrescu (Romania)

23 February 2022 2022 Arnold Clark Cup	England	3–1	Germany	Wolverhampton, England
19:30	White 15'; Greenwood (yellow card) 40'; Bright 84'; Kirby 90+4'	Report	Magull 41'; Brand (yellow card) 79'	Stadium: Molineux Stadium; Attendance: 14,463; Referee: Lina Lehtovaara (Finland)

8 April 2022 2023 World Cup qualifying	North Macedonia	0–10	England	Skopje, North Macedonia
20:00 CEST (UTC+2)	Rochi (yellow card) 44'; Salihi (yellow card) 75'; Maksuti (yellow card) 79'; Velkova (yellow card) 84'; Markovska (yellow card) 90'	Report	Mead 5', 12', 47', 53'; Toone 24', 74', 78'; White 41'; Stanway 45', 56'	Stadium: Toše Proeski Arena; Referee: Vivian Peeters (Netherlands)

12 April 2022 2023 World Cup qualifying	Northern Ireland	0–5	England	Belfast, Northern Ireland
19:55 BST (UTC+1)	Vance (yellow card) 72'	Report	Hemp 26', 60'; Toone 52'; Stanway 70', 79'	Stadium: Windsor Park; Attendance: 15,348; Referee: Riem Hussein (Germany)

16 June 2022 Friendly	England	3–0	Belgium	Wolverhampton, England
20:00	Bronze (yellow card) 49'; Kelly 62'; Daly 66'; Evrard 83' (o.g.)	Report		Stadium: Molineux Stadium; Attendance: 9,598; Referee: Sara Persson (Sweden)

24 June 2022 Friendly	England	5–1	Netherlands	Leeds, England
20:00	Bronze 32'; Greenwood (yellow card) 51'; Mead 53', 90'; Toone 72'; Hemp 74'	Report	Martens 22'; Nouwen (yellow card) 29'; Beerensteyn (yellow card) 45+2'	Stadium: Elland Road; Attendance: 19,365; Referee: Sandra Bastos (Portugal)

30 June 2022 Friendly	Switzerland	0–4	England	Zürich, Switzerland
18:00 CEST (UTC+2)	Calligaris (yellow card) 44'	Report	Russo (yellow card) 45+1', (goal) 56'; Stanway (yellow card) 69', (goal) 74' (pen.); England 76'; Scott 90+4'	Stadium: Letzigrund; Attendance: 10,022; Referee: Ainara Andrea Acevedo Dudley (Spain)

6 July 2022 Euro 2022 group stage	England	1–0	Austria	Manchester, England
20:00	Mead 16'	Report		Stadium: Old Trafford; Attendance: 68,871; Referee: Marta Huerta de Aza (Spain)

11 July 2022 Euro 2022 group stage	England	8–0	Norway	Brighton and Hove, England
20:00	Stanway 12' (pen.); Hemp 15'; White 29', 41'; Mead 34', 38', 81'; Russo 66'	Report	Blakstad (yellow card) 56'; Bizet Ildhusøy (yellow card) 77'; Maanum (yellow card) 87'	Stadium: Brighton Community Stadium; Attendance: 28,847; Referee: Riem Hussein (Germany)

15 July 2022 Euro 2022 group stage	Northern Ireland	0–5	England	Southampton, England
20:00		Report	Kirby 41'; Mead 45'; Russo 48', 53'; Burrows 76' (o.g.)	Stadium: St Mary's Stadium; Attendance: 30,785; Referee: Esther Staubli (Switzerland)

20 July 2022 Euro 2022 quarter-final	England	2–1 (a.e.t.)	Spain	Brighton and Hove, England
20:00	Toone 84'; Stanway 96'; Greenwood (yellow card) 119'	Report	Mapi León (yellow card) 45'; González 54'; Misa (yellow card) 88'	Stadium: Brighton Community Stadium; Attendance: 28,994; Referee: Stéphanie Frappart (France)

26 July 2022 Euro 2022 semi-final	England	4–0	Sweden	Sheffield, England
20:00	Mead 34'; Bronze 48'; Russo 68'; Kirby 77'; Stanway (yellow card) 85'	Report	Björn (yellow card) 73'	Stadium: Bramall Lane; Attendance: 28,624; Referee: Esther Staubli (Switzerland)

31 July 2022 Euro 2022 final	England	2–1 (a.e.t.)	Germany	London, England
17:00	Stanway (yellow card) 23'; White (yellow card) 24'; Toone 62'; Russo (yellow card) 100'; Kelly 111', (yellow card) 111'	Report	Rauch (yellow card) 40'; Oberdorf (yellow card) 57'; Schüller (yellow card) 58'; Magull 79'	Stadium: Wembley Stadium; Attendance: 87,192; Referee: Kateryna Monzul (Ukraine)

3 September 2022 2023 World Cup qualifying	Austria	0–2	England	Wiener Neustadt, Austria
16:30 CEST (UTC+2)		Report	Russo 7'; Parris 69'	Stadium: Stadion Wiener Neustadt; Attendance: 2,600; Referee: Iuliana Demetrescu (Romania)

6 September 2022 2023 World Cup qualifying	England	10–0	Luxembourg	Stoke-on-Trent, England
19:30	Stanway 11' (pen.), 26'; Russo 17'; Daly 38'; Mead 39'; England 47', 90+2'; Parris 59'; Toone 73' (pen.); Hemp 90'	Report		Stadium: Stoke Ground; Attendance: 24,174; Referee: Simona Ghisletta (Switzerland)

7 October 2022 Friendly	England	2–1	United States	London, England
20:00	Hemp 10'; Stanway 33' (pen.); Bright (yellow card) 45'	Report	Smith 28'; Mace (yellow card) 32'; Rodman (yellow card) 48'	Stadium: Wembley Stadium; Attendance: 76,893; Referee: Riem Hussein (Germany)

11 October 2022 Friendly	England	0–0	Czech Republic	Brighton and Hove, England
20:00		Report		Stadium: Falmer Stadium; Attendance: 21,222; Referee: Alexandra Collin (France)

11 November 2022 Friendly	England	4–0	Japan	San Pedro del Pinatar, Spain
20:00 CET (UTC+1)	Daly 38'; Kelly 53'; Toone 77'; Park 90+1'	Report		Stadium: Pinatar Arena; Referee: Zuzana Valentová (Slovakia)

15 November 2022 Friendly	England	1–1	Norway	San Pedro del Pinatar, Spain
20:00 CET (UTC+1)	Daly 33'		Sønstevold (yellow card) 66' (yellow-red card) 72'; Maanum 80'	Stadium: Pinatar Arena; Referee: Zuzana Valentová (Slovakia)

=== 2023 ===
16 February 2023 2023 Arnold Clark Cup	England	4–0	South Korea	Milton Keynes, England
19:45	Stanway 40' (pen.); Kelly 46'; Russo 50'; James 78'	Report	Son Hwa-yeon (yellow card) 8'; Jang Sel-gi (yellow card) 57'; Kim Jung-mi (yellow card) 85'	Stadium: Stadium MK; Attendance: 21,013; Referee: Andreza de Siqueira (Brazil)

19 February 2023 2023 Arnold Clark Cup	England	2–1	Italy	Coventry, England
15:15	Daly 32', 71'	Report	Cantore 62'	Stadium: Coventry Arena; Attendance: 32,128; Referee: Ivana Projkovska (North Macedonia)

22 February 2023 2023 Arnold Clark Cup	England	6–1	Belgium	Bristol, England
19:45	Kelly 12', 50'; Williamson 42', 90+3'; Biesmans 78' (o.g.); Bronze 89'	Report	Ampoorter (yellow card) 64'; Dhont 90+1'	Stadium: Ashton Gate; Attendance: 26,169; Referee: Jelena Cvetković (Serbia)

6 April 2023 2023 Finalissima	England	1–1 (4–2 p)	Brazil	London, England
19:45	Toone 23'; Earps (yellow card) 76'; Hemp (yellow card) 82'	Report	Rafaelle (yellow card) 39'; Andressa 90+3'	Stadium: Wembley Stadium; Attendance: 83,132; Referee: Stephanie Frappart (France)
	Penalties
	Stanway (penalty scored); Toone (penalty missed); Daly (penalty scored); Greenwood (penalty scored); Kelly (penalty scored)		(penalty scored) Adriana; (penalty missed) Tamires; (penalty missed) Rafaelle; (penalty scored) Kerolin

11 April 2023 Friendly	England	0–2	Australia	Brentford, England
19:45		Report	Kerr 32'; Grant 67'; Raso (yellow card) 89'; Arnold (yellow card) 90+1'	Stadium: Brentford Community Stadium; Attendance: 14,489; Referee: Natalie Simon (United States)

1 July 2023 Friendly	England	0–0	Portugal	Milton Keynes, England
15:15		Report	T. Pinto (yellow card) 80'; Gomes (yellow card) 90+3'	Stadium: Stadium MK; Attendance: 26,267; Referee: Esther Staubli (Switzerland)

22 July 2023 2023 World Cup group stage	England	1–0	Haiti	Brisbane, Australia
19:30 UTC+10	Stanway 29' (pen.), (yellow card) 45+9'; Hemp (yellow card) 51'	Report	Pierre-Louis (yellow card) 19'	Stadium: Lang Park; Attendance: 44,369; Referee: Emikar Calderas Barrera (Venezuela)

28 July 2023 2023 World Cup group stage	England	1–0	Denmark	Sydney, Australia
18:30 UTC+10	James 6'	Report		Stadium: Sydney Football Stadium; Attendance: 40,439; Referee: Tess Olofsson (Sweden)

1 August 2023 2023 World Cup group stage	China	1–6	England	Adelaide, Australia
20:30 UTC+9:30	Shuang 57' (pen.)	Report	Russo 4'; Hemp 26'; James 41', 66'; Bronze (yellow card) 56'; Kelly 77'; Daly 84'	Stadium: Hindmarsh Stadium; Attendance: 13,497; Referee: Casey Reibelt (Australia)

7 August 2023 2023 World Cup round of 16	England	0–0 (a.e.t.) (4–2 p)	Nigeria	Brisbane, Australia
17:30 UTC+10	James (red card) 87'	Report		Stadium: Lang Park; Attendance: 49,461; Referee: Melissa Borjas (Honduras)
	Penalties
	Stanway (penalty missed); England (penalty scored); Daly (penalty scored); Greenwood (penalty scored); Kelly (penalty scored)		(penalty missed) Oparanozie; (penalty missed) Alozie; (penalty scored) Ajibade; (penalty scored) Ucheibe

12 August 2023 2023 World Cup quarter-final	England	2–1	Colombia	Sydney, Australia
20:30 UTC+10	Hemp 45+6'; Russo 63'	Report	Santos 44'	Stadium: Stadium Australia; Attendance: 75,784; Referee: Ekaterina Koroleva (United States)

16 August 2023 2023 World Cup semi-final	Australia	1–3	England	Sydney, Australia
20:00 UTC+10	Kerr 63'	Report	Greenwood (yellow card) 10'; Toone 36'; Hemp 71'; Russo 86'; Kelly (yellow card) 90+5'	Stadium: Stadium Australia; Attendance: 75,784; Referee: Tori Penso (United States)

20 August 2023 2023 World Cup final	Spain	1–0	England	Sydney, Australia
20:00 UTC+10	Carmona 29'; Paralluelo (yellow card) 78'	Report	Hemp (yellow card) 55'	Stadium: Stadium Australia; Attendance: 75,784; Referee: Tori Penso (United States)

22 September 2023 2023–24 UEFA Nations League group stage	England	2–1	Scotland	Sunderland, England
19:45	Bronze 39'; Hemp 45'	Report	Hanson 45+2'	Stadium: Stadium of Light; Attendance: 41,947; Referee: Maria Sole Caputi (Italy)

26 September 2023 2023–24 UEFA Nations League group stage	Netherlands	2–1	England	Utrecht, Netherlands
19:00	Martens 34'; Jansen 90'; Roord (yellow card) 90+6'	Report	Daly (yellow card) 37'; Russo 64'	Stadium: Stadion Galgenwaard; Attendance: 24,000; Referee: Ivana Martinčić (Croatia)

27 October 2023 2023–24 UEFA Nations League group stage	England	1–0	Belgium	Leicester, England
19:45	Hemp 13'	Report		Stadium: King Power Stadium; Attendance: 28,321; Referee: Lina Lehtovaara (Finland)

31 October 2023 2023–24 UEFA Nations League group stage	Belgium	3–2	England	Leuven, Belgium
20:30 (UTC+1)	De Neve 9'; Detruyer (yellow card) 45+3'; Wullaert 45+6', 85' (pen.); Missipo (yellow card) 46'; Janssens (yellow card) 90+3'	Report	Bronze 38'; Kirby 44'	Stadium: Den Dreef; Attendance: 7,235; Referee: Esther Staubli (Switzerland)

1 December 2023 2023–24 UEFA Nations League group stage	England	3–2	Netherlands	London, England
19:45	Greenwood (yellow card) 31'; Stanway 58'; Hemp 60'; Toone 90+1'	Report	Beerensteyn 12', 35'; van Dongen (yellow card) 78'	Stadium: Wembley Stadium; Attendance: 71,632; Referee: Tess Olofsson (Sweden)

5 December 2023 2023–24 UEFA Nations League group stage	Scotland	0–6	England	Glasgow, Scotland
19:45	Docherty (yellow card) 72'	Report	Greenwood 12'; James 38', 39'; Mead 45+1'; Kirby 49'; Bronze 90+3'	Stadium: Hampden Park; Attendance: 15,320; Referee: Alina Peşu (Romania)

=== 2024 ===
23 February 2024 Friendly	England	7–2	Austria	Algeciras, Spain
20:45 CET (UTC+1)	Russo 3', 61'; Clinton 19'; Mead 37', 89'; J. Carter 70'; Daly 90+3'	Report	Kirchberger 30', 88', (yellow card) 49'	Stadium: Estadio Nuevo Mirador; Attendance: 949; Referee: Ainara Andrea Acevedo Dudley (Spain)

27 February 2024 Friendly	England	5–1	Italy	Algeciras, Spain
18:00 CET (UTC+1)	Wubben-Moy 2'; Hemp 21', 34'; Toone 69'; Daly 79'	Report	Cambiaghi 45+3'; Caruso (yellow card) 73'; Severini (yellow card) 81'	Stadium: Estadio Nuevo Mirador; Attendance: 650; Referee: María Eugenia Gil Soriano (Spain)

5 April 2024 Euro 2025 qualifying	England	1–1	Sweden	London, England
20:00	Russo 24'	Report	Rolfö 64'	Stadium: Wembley Stadium; Attendance: 63,248; Referee: Ivana Projkovska (North Macedonia)

9 April 2024 Euro 2025 qualifying	Republic of Ireland	0–2	England	Dublin, Ireland
18:30	McCabe (yellow card) 90+2'	Report	James 12'; Greenwood 18' (pen.)	Stadium: Aviva Stadium; Attendance: 32,742; Referee: Lina Lehtovaara (Finland)

31 May 2024 Euro 2025 qualifying	England	1–2	France	Newcastle, England
20:00	Mead 30'; Carter (yellow card) 45+1'	Report	De Almeida 41'; Katoto 69'; Lakrar (yellow card) 70'	Stadium: St James' Park; Attendance: 42,561; Referee: Marta Huerta de Aza (Spain)

4 June 2024 Euro 2025 qualifying	France	1–2	England	Saint-Étienne, France
21:00 CET (UTC+2)	Dali (yellow card) 71'; Diani 72' (pen.); Bacha (yellow card) 79'	Report	Stanway 22', (yellow card) 70'; Russo 35'; Bronze (yellow card) 71'; Hampton (yellow card) 81'; Kelly (yellow card) 87'	Stadium: Stade Geoffroy-Guichard; Attendance: 10,194; Referee: Ivana Martinčić (Croatia)

12 July 2024 Euro 2025 qualifying	England	2–1	Republic of Ireland	Norwich, England
20:00	Russo 5'; Stanway 57' (pen.)	Report	Fahey (yellow card) 56'; Kiernan (yellow card) 81'; Russell 90+4'	Stadium: Carrow Road; Attendance: 23,003; Referee: Catarina Campos (Portugal)

16 July 2024 Euro 2025 qualifying	Sweden	0–0	England	Gothenburg, Sweden
18:00 CEST (UTC+2)	Ijeh (yellow card) 83'	Report	Russo (yellow card) 53'	Stadium: Gamla Ullevi; Attendance: 16,789; Referee: Maria Caputi (Italy)

25 October 2024 Friendly	England	3–4	Germany	London, England
19:30	Bright (yellow card) 3'; Stanway 33' (pen.), 36'; Bronze 81'	Report	Gwinn 4' (pen.), 11'; Bühl 29'; Däbritz 72' (pen.); Kleinherne (yellow card) 90+2'	Stadium: Wembley Stadium; Attendance: 47,967; Referee: Marta Huerta de Aza (Spain)

29 October 2024 Friendly	England	2–1	South Africa	Coventry, England
19:45	Williamson 12'; Clinton 23'	Report	Kgatlana 55'; Biyana (yellow card) 76'; Mbane (yellow card) 84'	Stadium: Coventry Arena; Attendance: 20,400; Referee: Maria Sole Ferrieri Caputi (Italy)

30 November 2024 Friendly	England	0–0	United States	London, England
17:20	Kelly (yellow card) 90+4'	Report	Coffey (yellow card) 15'	Stadium: Wembley Stadium; Attendance: 78,346; Referee: Lina Lehtovaara (Finland)

3 December 2024 Friendly	England	1–0	Switzerland	Sheffield, England
19:45	Clinton 8'			Stadium: Bramall Lane; Attendance: 23,870; Referee: Catarina Campos (Portugal)

=== 2025 ===
21 February 2025 2025 UEFA Nations League group stage	Portugal	1–1	England	Portimão, Portugal
19:45	Amado (yellow card) 24'; T. Pinto (yellow card) 66'; K. Nazareth 75'	Report	Russo 15'; Park (yellow card) 35'; Walsh (yellow card) 65'; Clinton (yellow card) 79'	Stadium: Estádio Municipal de Portimão; Attendance: 3,221; Referee: Ivana Projkovska (North Macedonia)

26 February 2025 2025 UEFA Nations League group stage	England	1–0	Spain	London, England
20:00	Park 33'; Kelly (yellow card) 88'	Report	Paredes (yellow card) 23'	Stadium: Wembley Stadium; Attendance: 46,550; Referee: Tess Olofsson (Sweden)

4 April 2025 2025 UEFA Nations League group stage	England	5–0	Belgium	Bristol, England
20:00	Bronze 21'; Bright 45+1'; Beever-Jones 67'; Park 77'; Walsh 88'	Report	Vanhaevermaet (yellow card) 17'; Janssens (yellow card) 55'; Iliano (yellow card) 70'; Tysiak (yellow card) 87'	Stadium: Ashton Gate Stadium; Attendance: 23,202; Referee: Marta Huerta de Aza (Spain)

8 April 2025 2025 UEFA Nations League group stage	Belgium	3–2	England	Leuven, Belgium
19:30	Wullaert 4', 29'; Vanhaevermaet 16'; Philtjens (yellow card) 73'; Delacauw (yellow card) 78'; Teulings (yellow card) 88'; Blom (yellow card) 90+2'	Report	Mead 35' (pen.); Bronze (yellow card) 55'; Agyemang 81'; Toone (yellow card) 82'; Morgan (yellow card) 90+2'	Stadium: Den Dreef; Attendance: 6,253; Referee: Maria Caputi (Italy)

30 May 2025 2025 UEFA Nations League group stage	England	6–0	Portugal	London, England
19:45	Beever-Jones 3', 26', 33'; Bronze 5'; Mead 29'; Clinton (yellow card) 58'; Kelly 62'	Report	Capeta (yellow card) 79'	Stadium: Wembley Stadium; Attendance: 48,531; Referee: Frida Klarlund (Denmark)

3 June 2025 2025 UEFA Nations League group stage	Spain	2–1	England	Cornellà de Llobregat, Catalonia
19:00 CEST (UTC+2)	Aleixandri (yellow card) 29'; Pina 60', 70'	Report	Russo 22'; Kearns (yellow card) 83'; Walsh (yellow card) 90+3'	Stadium: RCDE Stadium; Attendance: 12,458; Referee: Katalin Kulcsár (Hungary)

29 June 2025 Friendly	England	7–0	Jamaica	Leicester, England
17:00 BST	Toone 10', 45+4'; Bronze 32'; Stanway 59'; Russo 71'; Beever-Jones 85'; Mead 90+6'	Report	Cardoza (yellow card) 60'	Stadium: King Power Stadium; Attendance: 25,088; Referee: Franziska Wildfeuer (Germany)

5 July 2025 UEFA Women's Euro 2025 Group D	France	2–1	England	Zurich, Switzerland
20:00 BST	Katoto 36'; Baltimore 39'; Peyraud-Magnin (yellow card) 90+1'	Report	Toone (yellow card) 75'; Walsh 87'	Stadium: Letzigrund; Attendance: 22,542; Referee: Tess Olofsson (Sweden)

9 July 2025 UEFA Women's Euro 2025 Group D	England	4–0	Netherlands	Zurich, Switzerland
17:00 BST	James 22', 60'; Stanway 45+2'; Toone 67'	Report	Dijkstra (yellow card) 69'	Stadium: Letzigrund; Attendance: 22,600; Referee: Edina Alves Batista (Brazil)

13 July UEFA Women's Euro 2025 Group D	England	6–1	Wales	St. Gallen, Switzerland
21:00 BST	Stanway 13' (pen.); Toone 21'; Hemp 30'; Russo 44'; Mead 73'; Beever-Jones 89'	Report	Cain 76'	Stadium: Arena St.Gallen; Attendance: 15,953; Referee: Frida Klarlund (Denmark)

17 July UEFA Women's Euro 2025 quarter-final	Sweden	2–2 (a.e.t.) (2–3 p)	England	Zurich, Switzerland
20:00 BST	Asllani 2'; Blackstenius 25'	Report	Bronze 79'; Agyemang 81'	Stadium: Stadion Letzigrund; Attendance: 22,397; Referee: Marta Huerta de Aza (Spain)
	Penalties
	Angeldahl (penalty missed); Zigiotti Olme (penalty scored); Eriksson (penalty missed); Björn (penalty scored); Falk (penalty missed); Jakobsson (penalty missed); Holmberg (penalty missed)		(penalty scored) Russo; (penalty missed) James; (penalty missed) Mead; (penalty missed) Greenwood; (penalty scored) Kelly; (penalty missed) Clinton; (penalty scored) Bronze

22 July UEFA Women's Euro 2025 semi-final	England	2–1 (a.e.t.)	Italy	Geneva, Switzerland
20:00 BST	Agyemang 90+6'; Kelly 119'	Report	Bonansea 33'	Stadium: Stade de Genève; Attendance: 26.539; Referee: Ivana Martinčić (Croatia)

27 July UEFA Women's Euro 2025 final	England	1–1 (a.e.t.) (3–1 p)	Spain	Basel, Switzerland
17:00 BST	Russo 57'	Report	Caldentey 25'	Stadium: St. Jakob-Park; Attendance: 34,203; Referee: Stéphanie Frappart (France)
	Penalties
	Mead (penalty missed); Greenwood (penalty scored); Charles (penalty scored); Williamson (penalty missed); Kelly (penalty scored)		(penalty scored) Guijarro; (penalty missed) Caldentey; (penalty missed) Bonmatí; (penalty missed) Paralluelo

25 October Friendly	England	1–2	Brazil	Manchester, England
17:30 BST	Stanway 52' (pen.)	Report	Zaneratto 9'; Dudinha 18'	Stadium: City of Manchester Stadium; Attendance: 37,460; Referee: Natalie Simon (United States)

28 October Friendly	England	3–0	Australia	Derby, England
19:00 GMT	Beever-Jones 20'; Bronze 40'; Stanway 90+8' (pen.)	Report		Stadium: Pride Park Stadium; Attendance: 26,544; Referee: Iuliana Demetrescu (Romania)

29 November Friendly	England	8–0	China	London, England
17:30 GMT	Mead 12', 14'; Hemp 16'; Stanway 23', 38' (pen.), 52'; Toone 71'; Russo 78'	Report		Stadium: Wembley Stadium; Attendance: 74,611; Referee: Ionela Peşu (Romania)

2 December Friendly	England	2–0	Ghana	Southampton, England
19:00 GMT	Kendall 6'; Russo 90+5' (pen.)	Report		Stadium: St Mary's Stadium; Attendance: 20,252; Referee: Lina Lehtovaara (Finland)

=== 2026 ===
3 March 2027 FIFA Women's World Cup qualification	Ukraine	1–6	England	Aksu, Türkiye
17:00 GMT	Kalinina 58'	Report	Russo 47', 51'; Stanway 64' (pen.), 70'; Park 78', 89'	Stadium: Mardan Sports Complex; Attendance: 275; Referee: Catarina Campos (Portugal)

7 March 2027 FIFA Women's World Cup qualification	England	2–0	Iceland	Nottingham, England
12:30 GMT	Bronze 22'; Stanway 78'	Report		Stadium: City Ground; Referee: Silvia Gasperotti (Italy)

14 April 2027 FIFA Women's World Cup qualification	England	1–0	Spain	London, England
19:00 BST	Hemp 3'	Report		Stadium: Wembley Stadium; Attendance: 62,306; Referee: Tess Olofsson (Sweden)

18 April 2027 FIFA Women's World Cup qualification	Iceland	0–1	England	Reykjavík, Iceland
16:30 BST		Report	Russo 21'	Stadium: Laugardalsvöllur; Attendance: 4,100; Referee: Michalina Diakow (Poland)

5 June 2027 FIFA Women's World Cup qualification	Spain	4–0	England	Mallorca, Spain
20:00 BST	Guijarro 19'; Putellas 38', 55'; Pina 78'	Report		Stadium: Estadi Mallorca San Moix; Attendance: 17,528; Referee: Ivana Martinčić (Croatia)

9 June 2027 FIFA Women's World Cup qualification	England	3–0	Ukraine	Liverpool, England
20:00 BST	Carter 14'; Stanway 37'; Mead 67'	Report		Stadium: Hill Dickinson Stadium; Attendance: 26,065; Referee: Emanuela Rusta (Albania)

9 October 2027 FIFA Women's World Cup play-offs	Greece	1–3	England	Heraklion, Greece
19:30 EET	Brookshire 77'	Report (FIFA); Report (UEFA)	Stanway 39'; Le Tissier 63'; Russo 67'	Stadium: Pankritio Stadium; Referee: Martina Molinaro (Italy)
