= Rachel Furness =

Northern Irish footballer (born 1988)

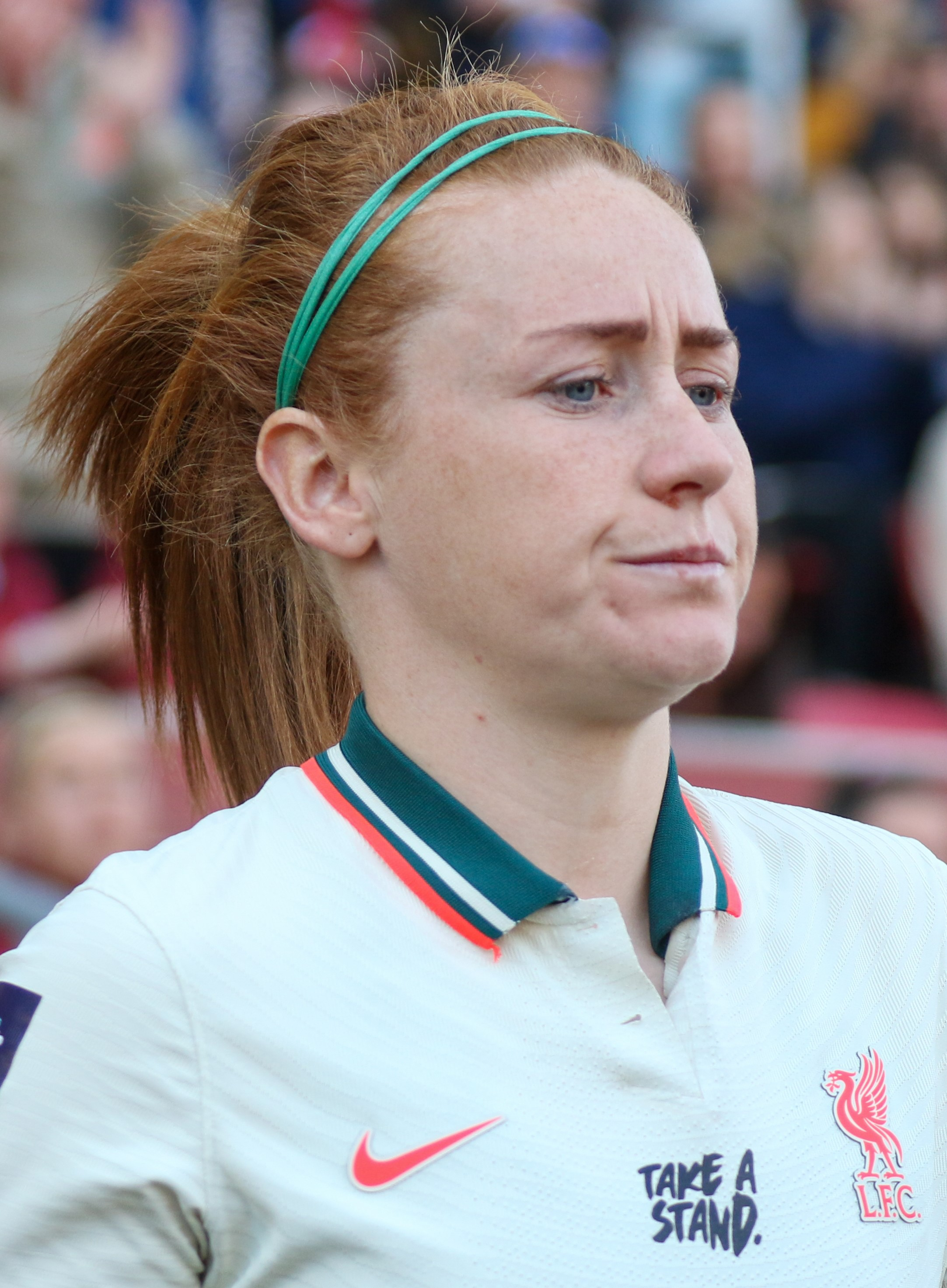
- Furness with Liverpool in 2022.

Personal information
- Full name: Rachel Furness
- Date of birth: 19 June 1988 (age 38)
- Place of birth: Washington, England
- Height: 1.69 m (5 ft 7 in)
- Position: Midfielder

Team information
- Current team: Newcastle United

Senior career*
Years	Team	Apps	(Gls)
2002–2004	Chester-le-Street		
2004–2006	Sunderland	12	(2)
2006–2010	Newcastle United	29	(11)
2010	Grindavik	12	(3)
2010–2016	Sunderland	26	(1)
2011	→ Lincoln (loan)	1	(0)
2017–19	Reading	43	(5)
2019	→ Tottenham Hotspur (loan)	9	(1)
2019–2023	Liverpool	37	(14)
2023–2024	Bristol City	21	(1)
2024–2025	Newcastle United	5	(0)

International career^{‡}
2005–2023	Northern Ireland	95	(38)
- * Club domestic league appearances and goals as of 08:38, 19 October 2024 (UTC) ‡ National team caps and goals as of 22:55, 13 July 2023 (UTC)

Rachel Furness (born 19 June 1988) is a former professional footballer. Born in England, she is the record goalscorer for the Northern Ireland national team.

== Club career ==
=== Early career ===
Furness attended Usworth Comprehensive School and represented Durham at County level. By season 2002–03 she was already playing for Chester-le-Street Ladies, alongside several other youngsters and former England striker Aran Embleton.

=== Senior career ===
In 2004 Furness moved to Gateshead College to study sports development and fitness. She began playing for the women's football academy at the college and Sunderland. Jill Scott was a teammate in both sides.

In 2006 Furness moved to Northumbria University to study sports development with coaching, and swapped Sunderland for Newcastle United. However, she had by then suffered a serious knee injury, which required two operations and the removal of most of the cartilage. Doctors advised Furness to stop playing football but she nevertheless resumed playing for Newcastle United.

In December 2009, Furness scored one and made the other for Mel Reay, as Newcastle drew 2–2 at OOH Lincoln Ladies in the FA Women's Cup, only to miss her penalty in the shootout defeat.

Furness spent the 2010 summer season in Iceland with Grindavik, then rejoined Sunderland – making her second debut for the club in a 4–0 Premier League Cup win over Newcastle in October 2010. After helping Sunderland win the Premier League title, Furness joined FA WSL club Lincoln Ladies on loan. She made a quick debut in Lincoln's 1–0 home defeat to Chelsea in May, the last game before the WSL mid–season break. She returned to parent club Sunderland before the WSL restarted in July.

In January 2017, Furness left Sunderland for Reading shortly after the Lady Black Cats reverted to part-time status.

Furness joined Tottenham Hotspur on a season-long loan from Reading on 6 September 2019. On 28 December 2019, Furness joined Liverpool, after being recalled by Reading.

On 19 July 2024, she joined Newcastle United as their sixth summer signing.

== International career ==
Chester-le-Street director of coaching Bill Godward alerted the Football Association to Furness' potential at an early stage. However, she was overlooked by England because she was not attached to a club with a centre of excellence or academy. Furness then accepted a call-up from Northern Ireland, and represented them in an U17 tournament in Spring 2004. Although born and raised in Tyne and Wear, Furness was eligible for Northern Ireland as her mother was born in Belfast.

After representing her adopted homeland at U17 and U19 level, Furness progressed to the senior international team. In November 2005 she scored against Slovakia, in Northern Ireland's first competitive home match for 20 years. Following a two-year absence from the national team caused by injury, Furness returned in time for the 2011 World Cup Qualifying campaign.

She contributed four goals, including a hat-trick against Croatia, as Northern Ireland ultimately finished third in their group behind France and Finland. In November 2011 Furness scored in Northern Ireland's shock 3–1 Euro 2013 qualifying win over former World and Olympic champions Norway.

Furness also represented Irish Universities at the World University Games, playing in the 2009 tournament in Belgrade. Two years later she was named in the Great Britain Universities squad for the event in Shenzhen.

The 2021 UEFA Women's European Championships Qualification saw record-breaking success for the Northern Ireland Women's National Team, and Furness played a key part in the squad. Several goals by Furness throughout normal qualification helped NI reach their first ever play-offs for a major tournament, a record in itself. This included the winning goal in a game away to Belarus , all the more vital given that NI had their keeper sent off within the first 30 minutes of the game.

There was little expectation that the squad would overcome this final obstacle to reach the tournament, given the higher-ranking opposition. In the first leg, away to Ukraine, Furness scored a vital goal to help NI to a truly surprise 2–1 victory. In the second leg, at home, Furness again made the starting team, but was forced off after an injury. The team won, securing their place in the 2022 tournament.

In November 2021, in back-to-back FIFA Women's World Cup qualifiers against North Macedonia, Furness scored historic goals to equal, then break, the Northern Ireland goalscoring record. In the first game, away, Furness notched a hatrick to equal the record. Then in the home fixture, she scored twice to take the record outright, overtaking the record of 36 goals for Northern Ireland, formerly held by David Healy.

In December 2021, Furness was awarded the NI BBC Sports Personality of the Year 2021 for her contribution to the national team's historic year .

In June 2022, Furness was named in the Northern Ireland squad for UEFA Women's Euro 2022, although the tournament ended unsuccessfully for her team as they finished bottom of Group A.

On 18 August 2022, Furness announced via social media that she was making herself unavailable for international selection for the foreseeable future for personal reasons, though she insisted she was not retiring altogether.

== Retirement ==
Furness announced her retirement from professional football on 5 June 2025.

== Career statistics ==
=== Club ===
As of match played 13 October 2024

Appearances and goals by club, season and competition
Club	Season	League			FA Cup		League Cup		Total	
Club	Season	Division	Apps	Goals	Apps	Goals	Apps	Goals	Apps	Goals
Sunderland	2015	Women Super League	13	1	1	0	5	0	19	1
Sunderland	2016	Women Super League	12	0	3	0	1	0	16	0
Sunderland	Total		25	1	4	0	6	0	35	1
Reading	2017	Women Super League	7	1	1	0	0	0	8	1
Reading	2017–18	Women Super League	17	3	1	0	6	3	24	6
Reading	2018–19	Women Super League	19	1	3	2	3	1	25	4
Reading	Total		43	5	5	2	9	4	57	11
Tottenham Hotspur (loan)	2019–20	Women Super League	9	1	0	0	2	0	11	1
Liverpool (loan)	2019–20	Women Super League	4	4	2	0	0	0	6	4
Liverpool	2020–21	Women's Championship	16	5	2	0	4	0	22	5
Liverpool	2021–22	Women's Championship	19	5	2	0	4	0	25	5
Liverpool	2022–23	Women Super League	9	1	0	0	4	1	13	2
Liverpool	Total		48	15	6	0	12	1	66	16
Bristol City	2022–23	Women's Championship	11	0	1	0	0	0	12	0
Bristol City	2023–24	Women Super League	10	1	0	0	2	1	12	2
Bristol City	Total		21	1	1	0	2	1	24	2
Newcastle United	2024–25	Women's Championship	5	0	0	0	1	0	6	0
Career total			150	22	16	2	32	6	199	30

=== International goals ===
Scores and results list Northern Ireland's goal tally first, score column indicates score after each Furness goal.

List of international goals scored by Rachel Furness
No.	Date	Venue	Opponent	Score	Result	Competition
1.	29 October 2005	Football Centre Mogoşoaia, Mogoşoaia, Romania	Romania	1–2	2–3	2007 FIFA Women's World Cup qualification
2.	10 November 2005	Ballymena Showgrounds, Ballymena, Northern Ireland	Slovakia	2–1	2–1	2007 FIFA Women's World Cup qualification
3.	12 May 2009	Forthbank Stadium, Stirling, Scotland	Scotland	1–?	1–3	Friendly
4.	24 October 2009	Stadion ŠRC Zaprešić, Zaprešić	Croatia	1–0	1–0	2011 FIFA Women's World Cup qualification
5.	25 August 2010	The Oval, Belfast, Northern Ireland	Croatia	1–0	3–1	2011 FIFA Women's World Cup qualification
6.	25 August 2010	The Oval, Belfast, Northern Ireland	Croatia	2–1	3–1	2011 FIFA Women's World Cup qualification
7.	25 August 2010	The Oval, Belfast, Northern Ireland	Croatia	3–1	3–1	2011 FIFA Women's World Cup qualification
8.	7 March 2011	Koinotiko Sotiras, Famagusta, Cyprus	Mexico	1–2	1–3	2011 Cyprus Women's Cup
9.	9 March 2011	Alpha Sports Centre, Larnaca, Cyprus	Switzerland	1–1	1–2	2011 Cyprus Women's Cup
10.	19 November 2011	Mourneview Park, Lurgan, Northern Ireland	Norway	1–0	3–1	UEFA Women's Euro 2013 qualification
11.	5 February 2012	Solitude, Belfast, Northern Ireland	Scotland	1–1	1–6	Friendly
13	17 September 2014	Mourneview Park, Lurgan, Northern Ireland	Faroe Islands	1–0	3–0	2015 FIFA Women's World Cup qualification
14.	17 September 2014	Mourneview Park, Lurgan, Northern Ireland	Faroe Islands	2–0	3–0	2015 FIFA Women's World Cup qualification
15.	27 November 2015	Mourneview Park, Lurgan, Northern Ireland	Switzerland	1–2	1–8	UEFA Women's Euro 2017 qualifying
16.	3 June 2016	Solitude, Belfast, Northern Ireland	Georgia	4–0	4–0	UEFA Women's Euro 2017 qualifying
17.	3 August 2016	Mourneview Park, Lurgan, Northern Ireland	Czech Republic	1–1	1–1	UEFA Women's Euro 2017 qualifying
18.	28 November 2017	Štadión pod Dubňom, Žilina, Slovakia	Slovakia	2–1	3–1	2019 FIFA Women's World Cup qualification
19.	27 February 2019	Evrenseki Stadium, Side, Turkey	Jordan	2–0	6–0	2019 Turkish Women's Cup
20.	27 February 2019	Evrenseki Stadium, Side, Turkey	Jordan	5–0	6–0	2019 Turkish Women's Cup
21.	27 February 2019	Evrenseki Stadium, Side, Turkey	Jordan	6–0	6–0	2019 Turkish Women's Cup
22.	3 March 2019	Hane, Side, Turkey	Kazakhstan	1–0	4–0	2019 Turkish Women's Cup
23.	5 March 2019	Gold City, Alanya, Turkey	Uzbekistan	2–0	2–1	2019 Turkish Women's Cup
24.	10 March 2020	Pinatar Arena, San Pedro del Pinatar, Spain	Scotland	1–0	1–2	2020 Pinatar Cup
25.	18 September 2020	Tórsvøllur, Tórshavn, Faroe Islands	Faroe Islands	1–0	6–0	UEFA Women's Euro 2022 qualifying
26.	27 October 2020	Dinamo Stadium, Minsk, Belarus	Belarus	1–0	1–0	UEFA Women's Euro 2022 qualifying
27.	27 November 2020	Seaview, Belfast, Northern Ireland	Belarus	2–1	3–2	UEFA Women's Euro 2022 qualifying
28.	1 December 2020	Seaview, Belfast, Northern Ireland	Faroe Islands	1–1	5–1	UEFA Women's Euro 2022 qualifying
29.	9 April 2021	Kolos Stadium, Kovalivka, Ukraine	Ukraine	1–0	2–1	UEFA Women's Euro 2022 qualifying play-offs
30.	17 September 2021	Inver Park, Larne, Northern Ireland	Luxembourg	2–0	4–0	2023 FIFA Women's World Cup qualification
31.	21 September 2021	Windsor Park, Belfast, Northern Ireland	Latvia	4–0	4–0	2023 FIFA Women's World Cup qualification
32.	25 November 2021	Petar Miloševski Training Centre, Skopje, North Macedonia	North Macedonia	1–0	11–0	2023 FIFA Women's World Cup qualification
33.	25 November 2021	Petar Miloševski Training Centre, Skopje, North Macedonia	North Macedonia	4–0	11–0	2023 FIFA Women's World Cup qualification
34.	25 November 2021	Petar Miloševski Training Centre, Skopje, North Macedonia	North Macedonia	8–0	11–0	2023 FIFA Women's World Cup qualification
35.	29 November 2021	Seaview, Belfast, Northern Ireland	North Macedonia	3–0	9–0	2023 FIFA Women's World Cup qualification
36.	29 November 2021	Seaview, Belfast, Northern Ireland	North Macedonia	8–0	9–0	2023 FIFA Women's World Cup qualification

== Honours ==
Bristol City

- FA Women's Championship: 2022–23

Liverpool

- FA Women's Championship: 2021–22
