= Marissa Callaghan =

Northern Irish footballer

Marissa Callaghan MBE
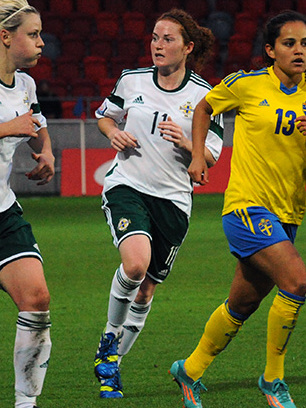
- Marissa Callaghan (center) in a match with Sweden (2005)

Personal information
- Full name: Marissa James Callaghan
- Date of birth: 2 September 1985 (age 41)
- Place of birth: Belfast, Northern Ireland
- Height: 1.65 m (5 ft 5 in)
- Position: Midfielder

Team information
- Current team: Cliftonville

Youth career
- Newington Girls

Senior career*
Years	Team	Apps	(Gls)
2005–2025	Cliftonville		

International career^{‡}
2010–2025	Northern Ireland	91	(9)
- * Club domestic league appearances and goals ‡ National team caps and goals as of 22:55, 13 July 2022 (UTC)

Marissa James Callaghan MBE (born 2 September 1985) is a Northern Irish former football midfielder who played her entire career for Cliftonville Ladies, and formerly for the Northern Ireland national team, of which she served as captain.

== Early career ==
Callaghan started playing football at 13 for the Newington Girls (now known as Cliftonville Ladies). After this, she went to university in the United States on a football scholarship. She returned to Northern Ireland in 2005 and started playing for Cliftonville again. She graduated with an advanced certificate in sports coaching from the University of Ulster in 2017. As a result, she also volunteered as a coach for Cliftonville Ladies. Later she became their academy director.

== With Northern Ireland ==
Callaghan made her international debut for the Northern Ireland women's national under-19 football team in 2002. She made her debut for Northern Ireland in 2010. In 2016, Callaghan was awarded the Northern Ireland Women's Football Association Women's Personality of the Year award. A year later she was the tournament ambassador for the 2017 UEFA Women's Under-19 Championship being held in Northern Ireland.

Callaghan was part of the squad that was called up to the UEFA Women's Euro 2022. She also captained the Northern Ireland team at Euro 2022.

== International goals ==
Scores and results list Northern Ireland's goal tally first.

No.	Date	Venue	Opponent	Score	Result	Competition
4.	9 March 2015	Umag 4, Umag, Croatia	Croatia	1–0	1–2	2015 Istria Cup
5.	3 June 2016	Solitude, Belfast, Northern Ireland	Georgia	2–0	4–0	UEFA Women's Euro 2017 qualifying
6.	3 June 2016	Solitude, Belfast, Northern Ireland	Georgia	3–0	4–0	UEFA Women's Euro 2017 qualifying
7.	13 April 2021	Seaview, Belfast, Northern Ireland	Ukraine	1–0	2–0	UEFA Women's Euro 2022 qualifying play-offs
8.	17 September 2021	Inver Park, Larne, Northern Ireland	Luxembourg	1–0	4–0	2023 FIFA Women's World Cup qualification
9.	21 September 2021	Windsor Park, Belfast, Northern Ireland	Latvia	3–0	4–0	2023 FIFA Women's World Cup qualification

== Career ==
After leaving university, Callaghan started working full-time in 2010 as a women's football community coach. In 2016, Callaghan was selected as a women's football ambassador for the Irish Football Association. Following this, she worked with Northern Ireland national football team captain Steven Davis to promote participation in women's youth football.

== Personal life ==
Callaghan is a Roman Catholic and has discussed representing Northern Ireland and the need of a national anthem that could represent a common identity to both Catholics and Protestants. She was appointed Member of the Order of the British Empire (MBE) in the 2025 New Year Honours for services to Association Football and to the community in Northern Ireland. She is married to her partner Paula and they have one son together.
