= Kirsty McGuinness =

Women's football and Gaelic football player

Personal information
- Date of birth: 4 November 1994 (age 31)
- Place of birth: Northern Ireland
- Height: 1.68 m (5 ft 6 in)
- Position: Winger

Team information
- Current team: Cliftonville Ladies

Senior career*
Years	Team	Apps	(Gls)
2008–2012	Linfield		
2012–2013	Glentoran Belfast United		
2013–2020	Linfield		
2020–2021	Sion Swifts	8	(11)
2021–	Cliftonville	37	(33)

International career^{‡}
2010-2013	Northern Ireland U19	11	(4)
2010–	Northern Ireland	57	(14)
- * Club domestic league appearances and goals ‡ National team caps and goals as of 22:55, 10 June 2023 (UTC)

Kirsty McGuinness (born 4 November 1994) is a Northern Irish women's association football player and GAA player. A winger, she plays football for Cliftonville Ladies and the Northern Ireland women's national football team. She formerly played for the Antrim Ladies Gaelic Football team, winning Ulster and All-Ireland titles in 2012.

== Club career ==
McGuinness, who is left-footed, started playing women's football when she was 14 and was chosen by the Linfield secretary to join them. In 2012, she crossed the Belfast's Big Two divide by joining Linfield's Belfast rivals Glentoran Belfast United. McGuinness helped Glentoran to a Women's Premiership and IFA Women's Challenge Cup double in her first season. However she rejoined Linfield after a season despite alleged interest from English club Arsenal Ladies.

In August 2020 Sion Swifts announced the double signing of Kirsty McGuinness and her sister Caitlin McGuinness, both from Linfield.

== International career ==
In July 2010, she made her debut for the senior Northern Ireland women's national football team in a 3–0 win over Estonia. She was 15 years and 262 days old. In November 2011 she scored in a shock 3–1 win over Norway at Mourneview Park. She had previously played for the Northern Ireland women's national under-19 football team and at under-17s level.

McGuinness was part of the squad that was called up to the UEFA Women's Euro 2022.

== Gaelic games ==
McGuinness also plays ladies' Gaelic football for Antrim GAA. In 2012, she was a part of the Antrim team that won the All-Ireland Junior Ladies' Football Championship. She also represented them in the Ulster Women's Intermediate Championship. She is among a small number of sportswomen who have played association football for Northern Ireland and GAA for Antrim. This differed from men's sport where there are traditionally sectarian divides between the historically majority Protestant association football and historically majority Roman Catholic GAA, which is no longer commonplace in women's sport in Northern Ireland. McGuinness would attend Linfield training wearing an Antrim shirt and vice versa. She is a Celtic F.C. supporter and admits she prefers football over Gaelic games.

== Football career statistics ==
No.	Date	Venue	Opponent	Score	Result	Competition
1.	19 November 2011	Mourneview Park, Lurgan, Northern Ireland	Norway	1–0	3–1	UEFA Women's Euro 2013 qualifying
2.	19 May 2012	Solitude, Belfast, Northern Ireland	Bulgaria	2–0	4–1	UEFA Women's Euro 2013 qualifying
3.	4 March 2016	Umag City Stadium, Umag, Croatia	Croatia	1–0	1–0	2016 Istria Cup
4.	28 February 2018	Evrenseki Stadium, Side, Turkey	Kazakhstan	1–0	2–0	2018 Turkish Women's Cup
5.	4 March 2018	Gold City Sports Complex, Alanya, Turkey	Ukraine	1–2	1–3	2018 Turkish Women's Cup
6.	18 September 2020	Tórsvøllur, Tórshavn, Faroe Islands	Faroe Islands	4–0	6–0	UEFA Women's Euro 2022 qualifying
7.	27 November 2020	Seaview, Belfast, Northern Ireland	Belarus	1–0	3–2	UEFA Women's Euro 2022 qualifying
8.	1 December 2020	Seaview, Belfast, Northern Ireland	Faroe Islands	2–1	5–1	UEFA Women's Euro 2022 qualifying
9.	21 September 2021	Windsor Park, Belfast, Northern Ireland	Latvia	2–0	4–0	2023 FIFA Women's World Cup qualification
10.	25 November 2021	Petar Miloševski Training Centre, Skopje, North Macedonia	North Macedonia	6–0	11–0	2023 FIFA Women's World Cup qualification
11.	29 November 2021	Seaview, Belfast, Northern Ireland	North Macedonia	1–0	9–0	2023 FIFA Women's World Cup qualification
12.	29 November 2021	Seaview, Belfast, Northern Ireland	North Macedonia	4–0	9–0	2023 FIFA Women's World Cup qualification
13.	29 November 2021	Seaview, Belfast, Northern Ireland	North Macedonia	5–0	9–0	2023 FIFA Women's World Cup qualification
