= Danielle Maxwell =

Northern Irish footballer

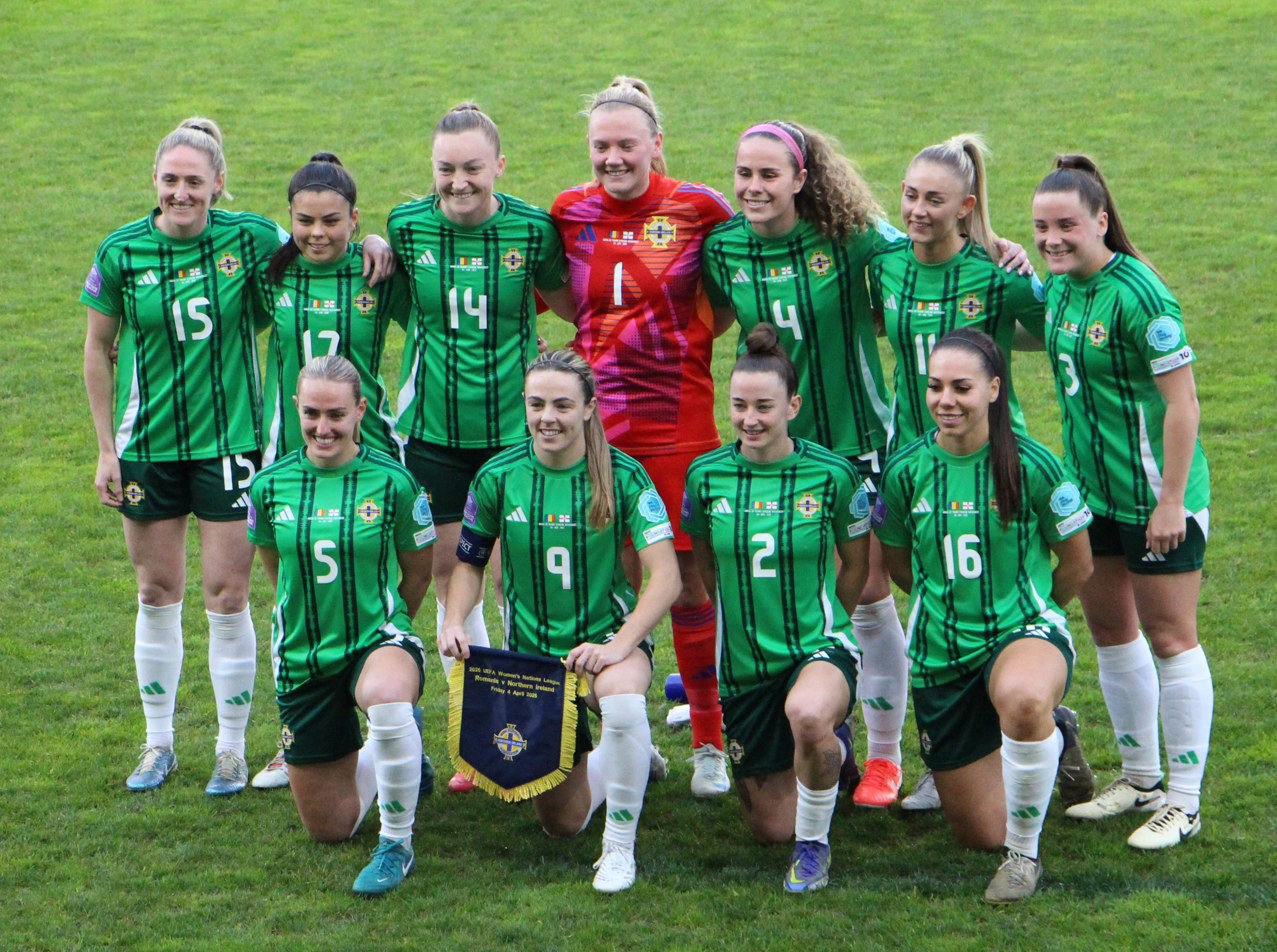
- Danielle Maxwell (second from right, top) with the Northern Ireland Women's National Football Team

Personal information
- Date of birth: 9 April 2002 (age 24)
- Place of birth: Northern Ireland,
- Position: Midfielder

Team information
- Current team: Burnley
- Number: 39

Youth career
- –2019: Glentoran

Senior career*
Years	Team	Apps	(Gls)
2019–2022	Glentoran	27	(5)
2022–2024	Cliftonville	35	(16)
2024	Blackburn Rovers	3	(1)
2024–2025	Cliftonville	16	(11)
2025–	Burnley		

International career^{‡}
2018–2019	Northern Ireland U17	10	(0)
2019–	Northern Ireland U19	2	(0)
2020–	Northern Ireland	16	(2)
- * Club domestic league appearances and goals ‡ National team caps and goals as of 4 February 2025

Danielle Maxwell (born 9 April 2002) is a Northern Irish association football player who plays as a midfielder for Burnley in the FA Women's National League North. She has previously played for Glentoran and Cliftonville in the Northern Irish Women's Premiership and Blackburn Rovers in the English Women's Championship. She also represents the Northern Ireland national team internationally.

== Club career ==
In April 2019, Maxwell signed her first senior contract with Glentoran, after being part of their academy. She scored 5 goals in 27 appearances for Glentoran.

In April 2022, Maxwell joined Cliftonville. Later that month, she registered her first goal for the club, scoring the opener in a 6–0 victory over Derry City. In February 2023, Maxwell was one of the first 12 female players signing professional contracts with the club, committing until at least 2025.

After 16 goals in 35 appearances for Cliftonville and being named 2023 Sports Direct Women's Premiership Player of the Year, in February 2024, Maxwell joined English club Blackburn Rovers on an undisclosed fee. In 3 months, she made four appearances, including scoring a goal against Durham and being named Player of the Match.

In May 2024, Maxwell returned to Cliftonville. In December, after helping the club win the NIFL Women's Premiership League Cup and IFA Women's Challenge Cup with a 100% winning record, she was named Player of the Year by the Northern Ireland Professional Footballers' Association. All together, she scored 27 goals in 51 appearances for Cliftonville, 11 goals in 16 appearances in her second stint.

Together with Cliftonville teammate Louise McDaniel, Maxwell signed for FA Women's National League North club Burnley in February 2025. She scored her first goal on debut, five minutes after coming on as a substitute in a 4–0 victory over Derby County.

== International career ==
In February 2020, Maxwell was called up for the first time to the Northern Ireland senior national team when she was named as part of the 2020 Pinatar Cup squad. She made her debut senior appearance in the tournament, coming on as a substitute in a 1–0 loss to Iceland. Three-and-a-half years later, she scored her first international goal in October 2023, rescuing a 1–1 draw against Hungary.

== International goals ==
No.	Date	Venue	Opponent	Score	Result	Competition
1.	31 October 2023	Seaview, Belfast, Northern Ireland	Hungary	1–1	1–1	2023–24 UEFA Women's Nations League
2.	1 December 2023	Arena Kombëtare, Tirana, Albania	Albania	3–0	4–0	2023–24 UEFA Women's Nations League
3.	4 April 2024	Stadionul Arcul de Triumf, Bucharest, Romania	Romania	1–0	1–1	2025 UEFA Women's Nations League
4.	14 April 2026	Mourneview Park, Lurgan, Northern Ireland	Malta	4–0	4–0	2027 FIFA Women's World Cup qualification
