= Simone Magill =

Northern Irish association footballer

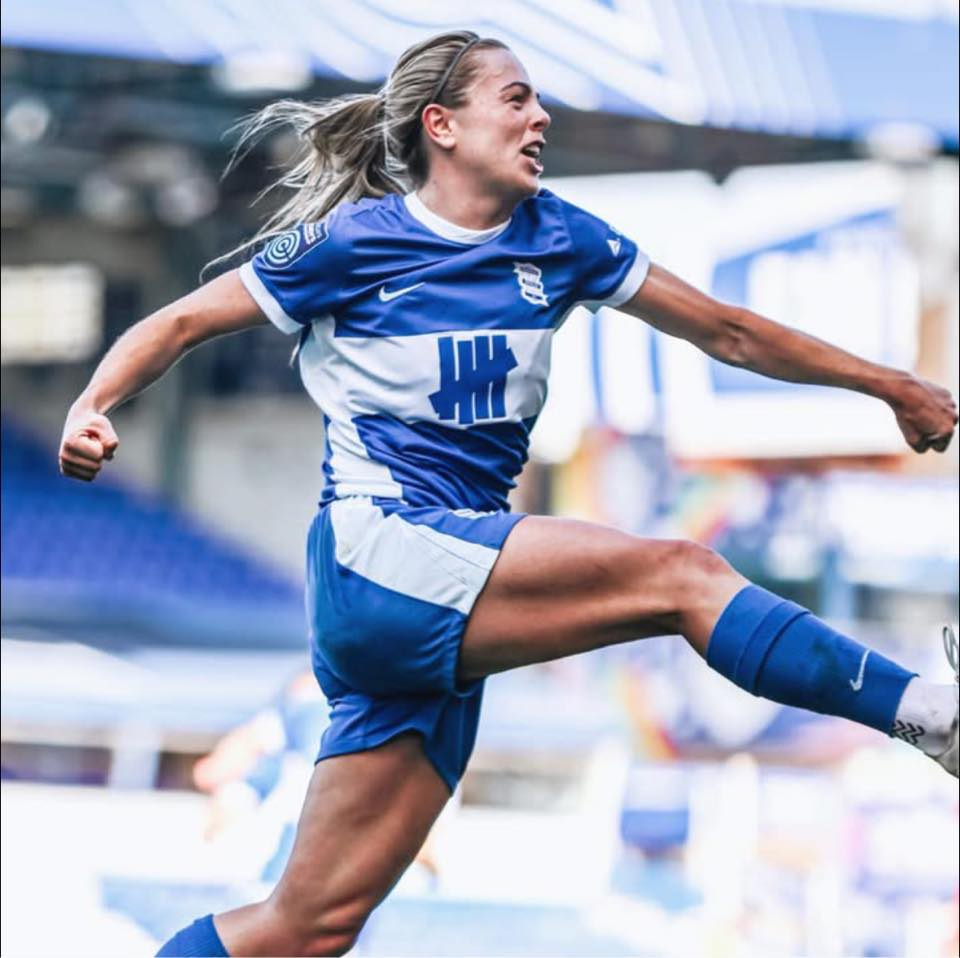
- Magill celebrates goal against Durham in Women's Championship

Personal information
- Date of birth: 1 November 1994 (age 32)
- Place of birth: Magherafelt, Northern Ireland
- Height: 1.66 m (5 ft 5 in)
- Position: Forward

Team information
- Current team: Birmingham City
- Number: 9

Senior career*
Years	Team	Apps	(Gls)
2010–2013	Mid-Ulster F.C.		(18)
2013–2022	Everton	152	(33)
2022–2024	Aston Villa	22	(2)
2024–	Birmingham City	19	(7)

International career^{‡}
2010	Northern Ireland U17	5	(6)
2010–2013	Northern Ireland U19	24	(13)
2010–	Northern Ireland	95	(28)
- * Club domestic league appearances and goals as of 25 June 2025 ‡ National team caps and goals as of 25 June 2025 (UTC)

Simone Magill (born 1 November 1994) is a Northern Irish professional footballer who plays as a forward for Women's Super League club Birmingham City and the Northern Ireland national team. Magill was named Northern Ireland captain in September 2025.

== Early life and education ==
Magill studied at Edge Hill University and graduated with a PhD in July 2026.

== Playing career ==
=== Club ===
==== Mid-Ulster ====
Magill began her football career in the development programs of Cookstown Youth FC and Mid-Ulster Ladies F.C. where she first played with an all female squad. During the 2010/2011 and 2011/2012 seasons, Magill would claim awards for the Northern Ireland Women's Premier League Player of the Year honors. She also finished the 2012 season as top goalscorer with 18 goals.

==== Everton ====
When she was 18, Magill made the move to WSL Side Everton L.F.C. after a successful trial in 2013 and later won Fans' Player of the Season in 2014/15. Suffering injury, Magill was sidelined for much for the 2016 season, but returned during the 2017 Spring Series scoring 5 goals in just 7 appearances.

In June 2017, Magill signed her first full-time professional contract with Everton. She was the second Everton player to do so and the first female Northern Irish footballer to sign a full-time contract. In May 2019 Magill won Everton's Player of the Season Award.

=== Aston Villa ===
On 6 July 2022, Magill was announced at Aston Villa on a permanent transfer.

=== Birmingham City ===
On 15 August 2024, Magill was announced at Birmingham City on a two year contract.

In her first season with Birmingham, Magill played a key role in the side and was awarded player of the season and top goalscorer in her first season.

Whilst at Birmingham City, she was studying a PHD in Sociology in football, with ambitions to become a director.

In the 25/26 season Magill having made two appearances scoring two goals and one assist, later announced that she and her husband were expecting their first child, therefore missed the remainder of that season. In May 2026 Magill announced the birth of her daughter.

== International career ==
Magill has represented Northern Ireland at multiple youth levels throughout her career and made her senior international debut in 2010, aged 15. She has captained the U-17 and U-19 squads.

In June 2016, Magill claimed herself a world record by scoring the fastest ever goal at international women's level in a European Qualifying match against Georgia. The 11-second goal beat the previous 12-second record scored by US forward, Alex Morgan.

Magill was a part of the squad that was called up to the UEFA Women's Euro 2022.

In January 2025, Magill was named Northern Ireland Women's Player Of The Year by the supporters.

In September 2025, Magill was named captain of the national team.

== Personal life ==
Magill got engaged to Mark Rigby in 2019, having met him at university. They married in 2021. In November 2025, Magill announced that she and Rigby were expecting their first child. later announcing the birth of their daughter in May 2026.

== International goals ==
No.	Date	Venue	Opponent	Score	Result	Competition
1.	19 May 2012	Solitude, Belfast, Northern Ireland	Bulgaria	1–0	4–1	UEFA Women's Euro 2013 qualifying
2.	12 April 2016	Mapei Stadium – Città del Tricolore, Reggio Emilia, Italy	Italy	1–0	1–3	UEFA Women's Euro 2017 qualifying
3.	3 June 2016	Solitude, Belfast, Northern Ireland	Georgia	1–0	4–0	UEFA Women's Euro 2017 qualifying
4.	3 March 2017	Umag City Stadium, Umag, Croatia	Chinese Taipei	1–0	8–0	2017 Istria Cup
5.	3 March 2017	Umag City Stadium, Umag, Croatia	Chinese Taipei	2–0	8–0	2017 Istria Cup
6.	3 March 2017	Umag City Stadium, Umag, Croatia	Chinese Taipei	3–0	8–0	2017 Istria Cup
7.	3 March 2017	Umag City Stadium, Umag, Croatia	Chinese Taipei	7–0	8–0	2017 Istria Cup
8.	27 February 2019	Evrenseki Stadium, Side, Turkey	Jordan	1–0	6–0	2019 Turkish Women's Cup
9.	3 March 2019	Hane, Side, Turkey	Kazakhstan	4–0	4–0	2019 Turkish Women's Cup
10.	3 September 2019	Rodney Parade, Newport, Wales	Wales	1–0	2–2	UEFA Women's Euro 2022 qualifying
11.	18 September 2020	Tórsvøllur, Tórshavn, Faroe Islands	Faroe Islands	2–0	6–0	UEFA Women's Euro 2022 qualifying
12.	18 September 2020	Tórsvøllur, Tórshavn, Faroe Islands	Faroe Islands	6–0	6–0	UEFA Women's Euro 2022 qualifying
13.	9 April 2021	Kolos Stadium, Kovalivka, Ukraine	Ukraine	2–1	2–1	UEFA Women's Euro 2022 qualifying play-offs
14.	25 November 2021	Petar Miloševski Training Centre, Skopje, North Macedonia	North Macedonia	3–0	11–0	2023 FIFA Women's World Cup qualification
15.	25 November 2021	Petar Miloševski Training Centre, Skopje, North Macedonia	North Macedonia	7–0	11–0	2023 FIFA Women's World Cup qualification
16.	25 November 2021	Petar Miloševski Training Centre, Skopje, North Macedonia	North Macedonia	9–0	11–0	2023 FIFA Women's World Cup qualification
17.	25 November 2021	Petar Miloševski Training Centre, Skopje, North Macedonia	North Macedonia	10–0	11–0	2023 FIFA Women's World Cup qualification
18.	30 November 2021	Seaview, Belfast, Northern Ireland	North Macedonia	7–0	9–0	2023 FIFA Women's World Cup qualification
19.	20 February 2022	Estadio Municipal de Marbella, Marbella, Spain	Switzerland	1–0	2–2	Friendly
20.	20 February 2022	Estadio Municipal de Marbella, Marbella, Spain	Switzerland	2–2	2–2	Friendly
21.	27 October 2023	Ménfői úti Stadion, Győr, Hungary	Hungary	2–2	2–3	2023–24 UEFA Women's Nations League
22.	1 December 2023	Arena Kombëtare, Tirana, Albania	Albania	1–0	4–0	2023–24 UEFA Women's Nations League
23.	1 December 2023	Arena Kombëtare, Tirana, Albania	Albania	2–0	4–0	2023–24 UEFA Women's Nations League
24.	27 February 2024	Windsor Park, Belfast, Northern Ireland	Montenegro	1–1	1–1	2023–24 UEFA Women's Nations League play-offs
25.	9 April 2024	Bosnia and Herzegovina FA Training Centre, Zenica, Bosnia & Herzegovina	Bosnia and Herzegovina	3–1	3–1	UEFA Women's Euro 2025 qualifying
26.	25 February 2025	Inver Park, Larne, Northern Ireland	Bosnia and Herzegovina	2–2	3–2	2025 UEFA Women's Nations League
27.	25 February 2025	Inver Park, Larne, Northern Ireland	Bosnia and Herzegovina	3–2	3–2	2025 UEFA Women's Nations League
28.	3 June 2025	Bosnia and Herzegovina FA Training Centre, Zenica, Bosnia & Herzegovina	Bosnia and Herzegovina	1–0	1–1	2025 UEFA Women's Nations League

== Honours ==
Everton

- FA Women's Cup runners-up: 2013–14
- FA WSL 2: 2017

Birmingham City

- Women's Super League 2: 2025–26

Individual

- Women's Premier League Player of the Year: 2010, 2012
- Everton Ladies Player of the Season: 2014–15
- Fastest International Women's goal scored (World Record) 3 June 2016
- Everton Ladies Player of the Season: 2018–19
- Northern Ireland Player of the year: 2023
- Northern Ireland Player of the year: 2024
- Birmingham City Player of the year: 2024-25
- Birmingham City Top Goalscorer: 2024-25
- Women’s Championship Player of the month April: 2025
