= Maria Plattner =

Austrian footballer

Personal information
- Full name: Maria Plattner
- Date of birth: 6 May 2001 (age 25)
- Place of birth: Hall in Tirol, Austria
- Position: Midfielder

Team information
- Current team: Red Bull Salzburg
- Number: 18

Youth career
- 2006–2009: SV Axams
- 2009–2015: Wacker Innsbruck
- 2015–2017: FC Natters

Senior career*
Years	Team	Apps	(Gls)
2017–2018	FC Bergheim	5	(1)
2018–2019	Wacker Innsbruck	18	(7)
2019–2020	Sturm Graz	9	(3)
2020–2023	Turbine Potsdam	32	(1)
2024–2026	Bayern Munich II	30	(5)
2025–2026	Bayern Munich	1	(0)
2026–	Red Bull Salzburg	1	(1)

International career^{‡}
2016–2017	Austria U16	6	(0)
2016–2018	Austria U17	23	(6)
2018–2020	Austria U19	19	(5)
2021–	Austria	19	(5)
- * Club domestic league appearances and goals as of 14:48, 2 August 2026 (UTC) ‡ National team caps and goals as of 17 April 2026

Maria Plattner (born 6 May 2001) is an Austrian footballer who plays as a midfielder for ÖFB Frauen Bundesliga club Red Bull Salzburg and the Austria women's national team.

== Club career ==
Plattner made her senior club debut for FC Bergheim in 2017 in an Austrian Frauen Bundesliga match. She spent the 2018–19 season at FC Wacker Innsbruck and the 2019-20 campaign with SK Sturm Graz.

In 2020, Plattner signed for German Frauen-Bundesliga club 1. FFC Turbine Potsdam. She played five times for Potsdam in their run to the 2021-22 DFB-Pokal Frauen final. She also started in the final, where they lost 4–0 to Wolfsburg. Plattner made 32 appearances across three seasons at Turbine Potsdam, registering one goal and six assists.

After leaving Potsdam in 2023, she spent the best part of two years back at Wacker Innsbruck.

On 18 January 2025, Bayern Munich announced the signing of Plattner from Innsbruck for their second team, who play in the 2. Frauen-Bundesliga.

== International career ==
Plattner represented Austria's under-16, under-17 and under-19 teams at youth level. She made her senior international debut on 17 September 2021 in a 2023 FIFA Women's World Cup qualifier against Latvia, replacing Verena Hanshaw in the 59th-minute of an 8–1 away win. Her first goals for the national team came on 12 April 2022 in the same qualification campaign, scoring twice against Latvia in a 8–0 home victory.

== International goals ==
Scores and results list Austria's goal tally first, score column indicates score after each Platter goal.

International goals by date, venue, opponent, score, result and competition
No.	Date	Venue	Opponent	Score	Result	Competition
1	12 April 2022	Stadion Wiener Neustadt, Wiener Neustadt, Austria	Latvia	5–0	8–0	2023 FIFA Women's World Cup qualification
2	12 April 2022	Stadion Wiener Neustadt, Wiener Neustadt, Austria	Latvia	8–0	8–0	2023 FIFA Women's World Cup qualification
3	22 June 2022	motion invest Arena, Maria Enzersdorf, Austria	Montenegro	2–0	4–0	Friendly
4	26 June 2022	Herman Vanderpoortenstadion, Belgium, Belgium	Belgium	1–0	1–0	Friendly
5	4 April 2025	Erve Asito, Almelo, Netherlands	Netherlands	1–3	1–3	2025 UEFA Women's Nations League
