= Louise McDaniel =

Northern Irish footballer

Personal information
- Date of birth: 25 May 2000 (age 26)
- Place of birth: Northern Ireland,
- Height: 1.65 m (5 ft 5 in)
- Position: Midfielder

Team information
- Current team: Burnley
- Number: 38

Senior career*
Years	Team	Apps	(Gls)
2017–2019	Linfield	10	(2)
2020–2025	Cliftonville	24	(10)
2025–	Burnley		

International career^{‡}
2017–2019	Northern Ireland U19	12	(4)
2021–	Northern Ireland	6	(0)
- * Club domestic league appearances and goals as of 27 October 2019. ‡ National team caps and goals as of 23:10, 31 July 2022 (UTC)

Louise McDaniel (born 24 May 2000) is a Northern Irish association footballer who plays as a midfielder for Burnley in the FA Women's National League North and the Northern Ireland women's national team.

== Club career ==
McDaniel has played for Linfield FC in Northern Ireland. Louise currently plays for North Belfast side Cliftonville Ladies and is part of the full-time Northern Ireland Women's squad preparing for the European Championships in England.

Together with Cliftonville teammate Danielle Maxwell, McDaniel signed for FA Women's National League North club Burnley in February 2025.

== International career ==
McDaniel made her senior debut for Northern Ireland on 23 February 2021.

McDaniel was part of the squad that was called up to the UEFA Women's Euro 2022.

== International goals ==
No.	Date	Venue	Opponent	Score	Result	Competition
1.	21 September 2021	Windsor Park, Belfast, Northern Ireland	Latvia	1–0	4–0	2023 FIFA Women's World Cup qualification
