= Rebecca McKenna =

Northern Irish footballer

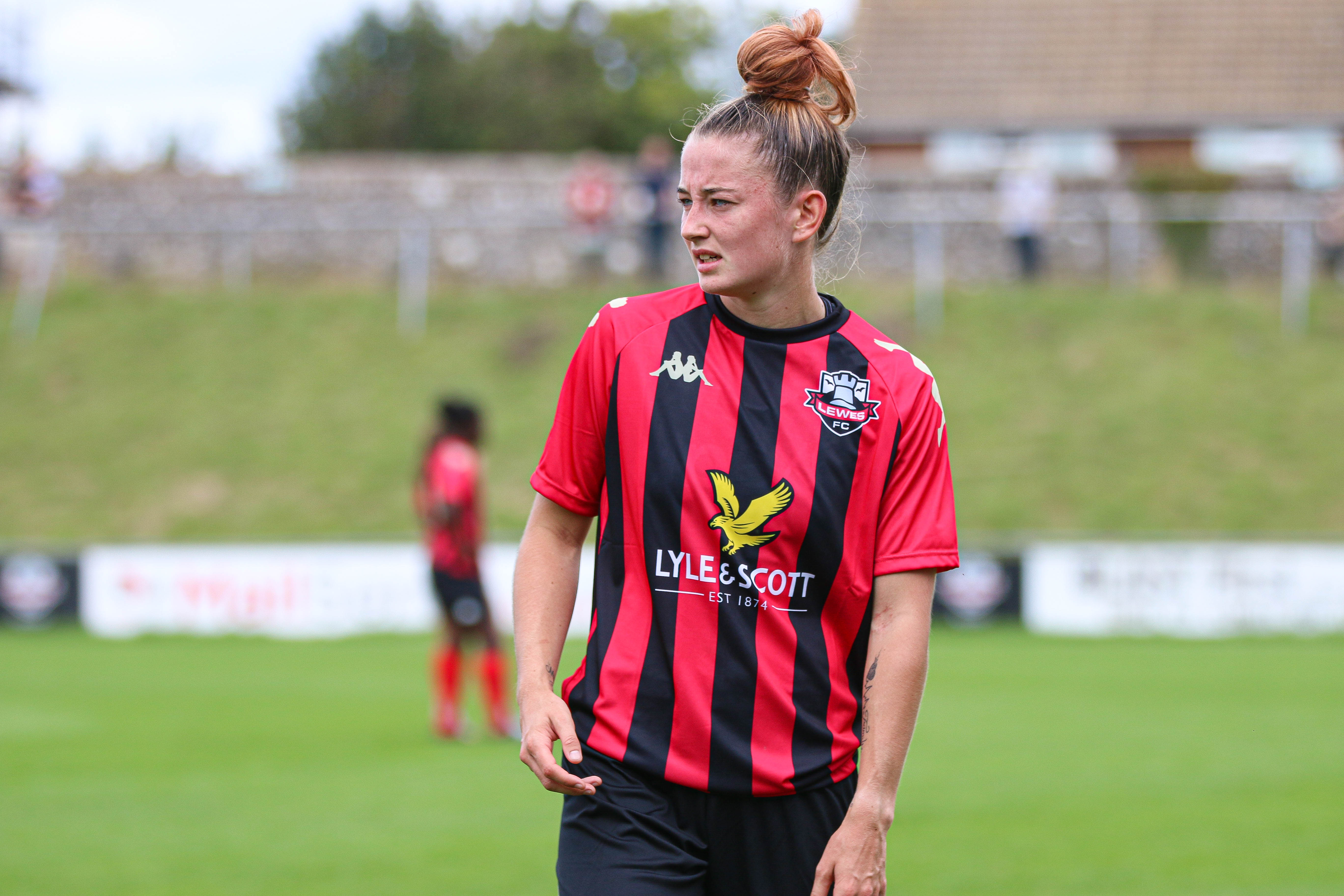
- McKenna with Lewes in 2021

Personal information
- Full name: Rebecca McKenna
- Date of birth: 13 April 2001 (age 25)
- Place of birth: Bangor, Northern Ireland
- Height: 1.62 m (5 ft 4 in)
- Positions: Full-back; midfielder

Team information
- Current team: Birmingham City
- Number: 18

Senior career*
Years	Team	Apps	(Gls)
	Glentoran	0	(0)
2017–2021	Linfield	0	(0)
2021–2023	Lewes	28	(0)
2023–2024	Charlton Athletic	11	(0)
2024–	Birmingham City	4	(0)

International career^{‡}
2018–	Northern Ireland	63	(2)
- * Club domestic league appearances and goals as of 26 November 2023 ‡ National team caps and goals as of 18 October 2026

Rebecca McKenna (born 13 April 2001) is a Northern Irish professional footballer who plays as a defender for Women's Super League club Birmingham City and the Northern Ireland national team. She has appeared for Lewes in the FA Women's Championship.

== Career ==
On 6 July 2021 McKenna joined FA Women's Championship team Lewes.

In September 2022 she scored the winning goal for Northern Ireland when they played Luxembourg. McKenna said that she advised any other Northern Irish players to take a spell with a mainland British team if offered. McKenna appeared in every match for Lewes in the 2022–2023 season. She left the club at the end of that season and joined Charlton Athletic on a one-year contract. Upon the expiry of her contract she left Charlton Athletic and joined Birmingham City on a two-year deal.

== International career ==
McKenna has been capped for the Northern Ireland national team, appearing for the team during the 2019 FIFA Women's World Cup qualifying cycle.

McKenna was part of the squad that was called up to the UEFA Women's Euro 2022.

== International goals ==
No.	Date	Venue	Opponent	Score	Result	Competition
1.	25 November 2021	Petar Miloševski Training Centre, Skopje, North Macedonia	North Macedonia	2–0	11–0	2023 FIFA Women's World Cup qualification
2.	2 September 2022	Stade Émile Mayrisch, Esch-sur-Alzette, Luxembourg	Luxembourg	2–1	2–1	2023 FIFA Women's World Cup qualification

== Honours ==
Birmingham City

- Women's Super League 2: 2025–26
