= Northern Ireland women's national football team =

Women's national association football team representing Northern Ireland

Northern Ireland
- Association: Irish Football Association (IFA)
- Confederation: UEFA (Europe)
- Head coach: Michael McArdle
- Captain: Simone Magill
- Most caps: Julie Nelson (130)
- Top scorer: Rachel Furness (38)
- Home stadium: Windsor Park
- FIFA code: NIR
First colours	Second colours

FIFA ranking
- Current: 52 ▼2 (20 October 2026)
- Highest: 44 (December 2024 – December 2025)
- Lowest: 85 (June 2005)

First international
- Republic of Ireland 4–1 Northern Ireland (Dublin, Republic of Ireland; 30 June 1973)

Biggest win
- North Macedonia 0–11 Northern Ireland (Skopje, North Macedonia; 25 November 2021)

Biggest defeat
- Scotland 11–1 Northern Ireland (Clydebank, Scotland, 23 November 1974); England 10–0 Northern Ireland (Blackburn, England, 16 March 1986)

World Cup
- Appearances: 1 (first in 2035)

European Championship
- Appearances: 1 (first in 2022)
- Best result: Group stage (2022)

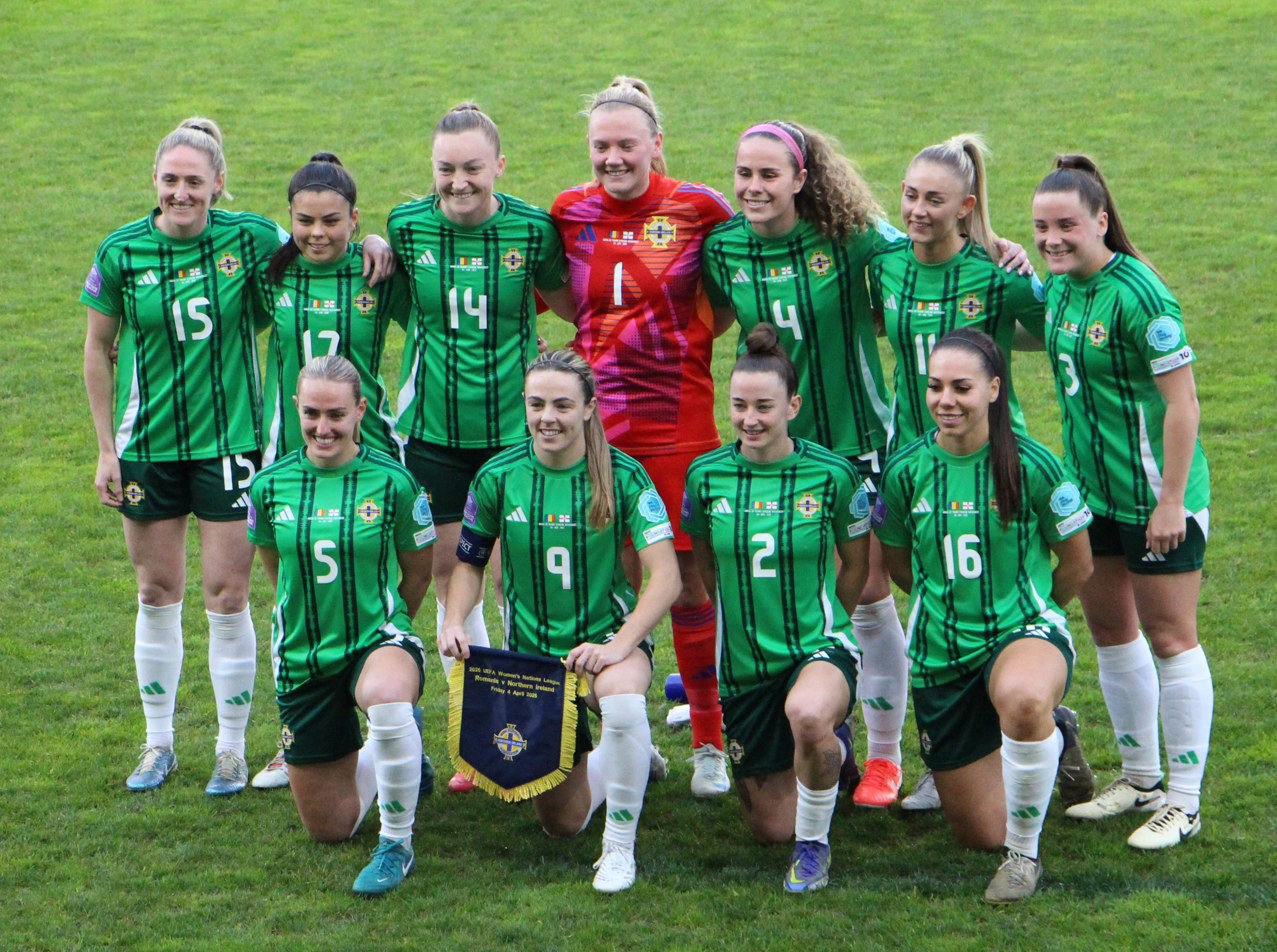
Northern Ireland women's national football team in 2025

The Northern Ireland women's national football team represents Northern Ireland in international women's football. Although most national football teams represent a sovereign state, FIFA statutes permit Northern Ireland as a member of the United Kingdom's Home Nations to maintain its own national side that competes in all major tournaments, with the exception of the Women's Olympic Football Tournament.

The team were the lowest UEFA-ranked team (27th) to qualify for the European Championships Finals in England in 2022. They are set to participate in the World Cup for the first time in 2035 as they automatically qualified as co-host along with other three countries in the United Kingdom.

In September 2021 it was announced that the senior women's team would be adopting a full-time professional set up ahead of Euro 2022.

== Results and fixtures ==
The following is a list of match results in the last 12 months, as well as any future matches that have been scheduled.

Legend

Win Draw Loss Fixture

=== 2026 ===
3 March 2027 FIFA Women's World Cup qualification	Switzerland	2–0	Northern Ireland	Lausanne, Switzerland
18:00	Xhemaili 22'; Fölmli 90+1'	Report		Stadium: Stade de la Tuilière; Attendance: 4,165; Referee: Shona Shukrula (Netherlands)

7 March 2027 FIFA Women's World Cup qualification	Northern Ireland	0–1	Turkey	Lurgan, County Armagh
19:00		Report	Türkoğlu 24'	Stadium: Mourneview Park; Attendance: 2,186; Referee: Olivia Tschon (Austria)

14 April 2027 FIFA Women's World Cup qualification	Northern Ireland	4–0	Malta	Lurgan, County Armagh
	Halliday 5', 52'; Andrews 17'; Maxwell 60'	Report		Stadium: Mourneview Park

18 April 2027 FIFA Women's World Cup qualification	Malta	2–4	Northern Ireland	Ta' Qali, Malta
		Report		Stadium: Centenary Stadium

5 June 2027 FIFA Women's World Cup qualification	Turkey	2–1	Northern Ireland	Istanbul, Turkey
20:00	Pekel 26'; Şeker 48'		Bell 45'(p)	Stadium: Pendik Stadium; Referee: Collin (FRA), Brassard (FRA), Coppola (FRA)

9 June 2027 FIFA Women's World Cup qualification	Northern Ireland	1–2	Switzerland	Lurgan, County Armagh
19:30	Cassap 85'	Report (UEFA)	Reuteler 29'; Vallotto 41'	Stadium: Mourneview Park; Referee: Anastasia Mylopoulou (Greece)

9 October 2026 2027 FIFA Women's World Cup qualification	Northern Ireland	0–4	Portugal	Larne, Northern Ireland
20:00 (19:00 UTC+1)		Report (FIFA); Report (UEFA)	Encarnação 8'; J. Silva 22'; Holloway 28' (o.g.); F. Pinto 83'	Stadium: Inver Park; Attendance: 1,432; Referee: Iuliana Demetrescu (Romania)

13 October 2026 2027 FIFA Women's World Cup qualification	Portugal	3–1	Northern Ireland	Portimão
20:15 (19:15 UTC+1)	Santiago 45+2'; Silva 74'; Costa 83'	Report (FIFA); Report (UEFA)	Elmore 31'	Stadium: Estádio Municipal de Portimão; Referee: Silvia Gasperotti (Italy)

27 November Friendly	Northern Ireland	v	Greece	Larne, Northern Ireland
19:00 UTC+0		Report		Stadium: Inver Park

1 December Friendly	Northern Ireland	v	Greece	Larne, Northern Ireland
16:00 UTC+0		Report		Stadium: Inver Park

== Coaching staff ==
=== Manager history ===
- (Northern Ireland) Alfie Wylie (2004–2019)
- (Northern Ireland) Kenny Shiels (2019–2023)
- (Australia) Tanya Oxtoby (2023–2025)
- (Scotland) Michael McArdle (2026–)

== Players ==
=== Current squad ===
The following players were called up for the 2027 FIFA Women's World Cup play-off matches against Portugal on 9 and 13 October 2026, respectively.

Caps and goals correct as of 9 June 2026, after the match against Switzerland.

No.	Pos.	Player	Date of birth (age)	Caps	Goals	Club
	GK	Jackie Burns	6 March 1997 (age 29)	69	0	(The Football Association) Burnley
	GK	Lauren Perry	5 April 2001 (age 25)	6	0	(Scottish Football Association) Montrose
	GK	Maddy Harvey-Clifford	8 May 2002 (age 24)	4	0	(Irish Football Association) Cliftonville
	DF	Rebecca McKenna	13 April 2001 (age 25)	63	2	(The Football Association) Birmingham City
	DF	Rebecca Holloway	25 August 1995 (age 31)	42	3	(The Football Association) Birmingham City
	DF	Ellie Mason	16 February 1996 (age 30)	19	2	(The Football Association) Charlton Athletic
	DF	Natalie Johnson	12 November 1993 (age 33)	13	1	(The Football Association) Norwich City
	DF	Abi Sweetlove	9 April 2006 (age 20)	3	0	(Irish Football Association) Linfield
	DF	Fionnuala Morgan	24 August 2003 (age 23)	3	0	(Scottish Football Association) Celtic
	DF	Emily Cassap	11 May 2007 (age 19)	1	1	(The Football Association) Sunderland
	DF	Lucy-Jayne Grant	30 December 2003 (age 22)	0	0	(Football Association of Ireland) Galway United
	DF	Jane McMaster	16 August 2004 (age 22)	0	0	(Irish Football Association) Linfield
	MF	Brenna McPartlan	1 September 1999 (age 27)	22	1	(The Football Association) Burnley
	MF	Keri Halliday	11 February 2005 (age 21)	16	2	(Scottish Football Association) Hearts
	MF	Aimee Kerr	31 May 2006 (age 20)	6	0	(Irish Football Association) Glentoran
	MF	Mia Moore	14 September 2007 (age 19)	6	0	(Irish Football Association) Glentoran
	MF	Naomi McLaughlin	15 November 2005 (age 21)	0	0	(Irish Football Association) Glentoran
	MF	Charlotte Havern	16 October 2009 (age 17)	0	0	(Irish Football Association) Cliftonville
	FW	Lauren Wade	22 November 1993 (age 32)	83	14	(Scottish Football Association) Hearts
	FW	Casey Howe	2 September 2002 (age 24)	16	0	(Scottish Football Association) Celtic
	FW	Leyla McFarland	14 July 2003 (age 23)	6	1	(Swiss Football Association) Rapperswil-Jona
	FW	Cora Chambers	8 December 2003 (age 22)	3	0	(Irish Football Association) Linfield
	FW	Kess Elmore	1 November 1998 (age 28)	0	0	(Football Association of the Czech Republic) Sparta Prague

=== Recent call-ups ===
The following players have also been called up to the squad within the past 12 months.

Pos.	Player	Date of birth (age)	Caps	Goals	Club	Latest call-up
GK	Abbie Smith	15 August 2008 (age 18)	0	0	(England) Manchester City	v. Malta, 18 April 2026
GK	Kate Smith	10 May 2007 (age 19)	1	0	(Northern Ireland) Lisburn Rangers	v. Iceland, 29 October 2025
DF	Kelsie Burrows	22 February 2001 (age 25)	15	0	(Northern Ireland) Cliftonville	v. Switzerland, 9 June 2026
DF	Laura Rafferty	29 April 1996 (age 30)	57	0	(Scotland) Rangers	v. Malta, 18 April 2026
DF	Sarah McFadden	17 May 1987 (age 39)	109	9	(England) Durham	v. Turkey, 7 March 2026
DF	Toni-Leigh Finnegan	4 December 1999 (age 26)	2	0	(Scotland) Aberdeen	v. Iceland, 29 October 2025
MF	Megan Bell	17 April 2001 (age 25)	45	4	(Northern Ireland) Linfield	v. Switzerland, 9 June 2026
MF	Nadene Caldwell	24 January 1991 (age 35)	93	1	(Northern Ireland) Glentoran	v. Switzerland, 9 June 2026
MF	Joely Andrews	20 April 2002 (age 24)	37	3	(Scotland) Hibernian	v. Switzerland, 9 June 2026
MF	Louise McDaniel	24 May 2000 (age 26)	21	1	(England) Burnley	v. Malta, 18 April 2026
MF	Rachel Furness ^{RET}	19 June 1988 (age 38)	95	38	Retired	v. Bosnia and Herzegovina, 3 June 2025
FW	Danielle Maxwell	9 April 2002 (age 24)	27	4	(Northern Ireland) Cliftonville	v. Switzerland, 9 June 2026
FW	Caragh Hamilton	18 October 1996 (age 30)	54	7	(England) Nottingham Forest	v. Malta, 18 April 2026
FW	Kascie Weir ^{PRE}	2 October 2006 (age 20)	8	1	(Northern Ireland) Glentoran	v. Malta, 14 April 2026
FW	Emily Wilson	26 August 2001 (age 25)	33	1	(Northern Ireland) Glentoran	v. Iceland, 29 October 2025
FW	Kerry Beattie	27 September 2002 (age 24)	12	3	(Scotland) Aberdeen (on loan from Hearts)	v. Iceland, 29 October 2025
Notes: ^{INJ} = Withdrew due to injury; ^{PRE} = Preliminary squad / standby; ^{RET} = Retired from the national team

== Records ==
As of 9 June 2026

Players in bold are still active with the national team.

=== Most Appearances ===
Rank	Player	Career	Caps	Goals
1	**Julie Nelson**	2004–present	130	9
2	Ashley Hutton	2005–2022	115	9
3	**Sarah McFadden**	2005–present	109	9
4	Rachel Furness	2005–2023	95	38
4	**Simone Magill**	2010–present	95	28
4	**Demi Vance**	2009–present	95	4
7	**Nadene Caldwell**	2009–present	93	1
8	**Marissa Callaghan**	2010–present	86	9
9	**Lauren Wade**	2015–present	83	14
10	**Jackie Burns**	2013–present	69	0

=== Top goalscorers ===
Rank	Player	Career	Goals	Caps	Avg.
1	Rachel Furness	2005–2023	38	95	0.40
2	**Simone Magill**	2010–present	28	95	0.29
3	Kirsty McGuinness	2010–2023	14	57	0.25
3	**Lauren Wade**	2015–present	14	83	0.17
5	**Marissa Callaghan**	2010–present	9	86	0.10
5	**Sarah McFadden**	2005–present	9	109	0.08
5	Ashley Hutton	2005–2022	9	115	0.08
5	**Julie Nelson**	2004–present	9	130	0.07
9	**Caragh Hamilton**	2012–present	7	56	0.13
10	**Danielle Maxwell**	2020–present	4	27	0.15
10	**Megan Bell**	20017–present	4	45	0.09
10	**Demi Vance**	2009–present	4	95	0.04

Simone Magill holds the world record for the fastest international goal in women's football. Previously, US forward Alex Morgan had held the record at twelve seconds. Magill achieved an eleven-second goal against Georgia at the start of a European Qualifying match on 3 June 2016. The goal marks the fastest ever international goal by any national Northern Irish team – male or female.

== Competitive record ==
=== FIFA Women's World Cup ===
FIFA Women's World Cup record									Qualification record						
Year	Result	GP	W	D*	L	GF	GA	GD	GP	W	D*	L	GF	GA	GD
(China) 1991	Did not qualify								UEFA EURO 1991						
(Sweden) 1995	Did not enter								UEFA EURO 1995						
(United States) 1999	Did not enter								Did not enter						
(United States) 2003	Did not enter								Did not enter						
(China) 2007	Did not qualify								6	2	1	3	7	11	−4
(Germany) 2011	Did not qualify								10	3	2	5	8	16	−8
(Canada) 2015	Did not qualify								10	1	2	7	3	19	−16
(France) 2019	Did not qualify								8	1	0	7	4	27	−23
(Australia) (New Zealand) 2023	Did not qualify								10	6	1	3	36	16	+20
(Brazil) 2027	Did not qualify								8	2	0	6	11	16	-5
(Costa Rica) (Jamaica) (Mexico) (United States) 2031	To be determined								To be determined						
(United Kingdom) 2035	Qualified								Qualified as co-host						
Total	1/12	-	-	-	-	-	-	-	52	15	11	29	69	105	−36

*Draws include knockout matches decided on penalty kicks.

=== UEFA Women's Championship ===
UEFA Women's Championship record								Qualifying record							
Year	Result	GP	W	D*	L	GF	GA	GP	W	D*	L	GF	GA	P/R	Rnk
(England) (Italy) (Norway) (Sweden) 1984	Did not qualify							6	0	0	6	5	21	–	
(Norway) 1987	Did not qualify							6	0	0	6	2	35	–	
(West Germany) 1989	Did not enter							Did not enter							
(Denmark) 1991	Did not qualify							4	0	0	4	1	21	–	
(Italy) 1993	Did not enter							Did not enter							
(England) (Germany) (Norway) (Sweden) 1995	Did not enter							Did not enter							
(Norway) (Sweden) 1997	Did not enter							Did not enter							
(Germany) 2001	Did not enter							Did not enter							
(England) 2005	Did not enter							Did not enter							
(Finland) 2009	Did not qualify							11	2	1	8	11	28	–	
(Sweden) 2013	Did not qualify							10	3	2	5	12	15	–	
(Netherlands) 2017	Did not qualify							8	2	1	5	10	22	–	
(England) 2022	Group stage	3	0	0	3	1	11	10	6	2	2	21	18	–	
(Switzerland) 2025	Did not qualify							10	4	2	4	10	15	(Note: From Euro 2025 onwards a new qualifying format was introduced, linked to the Women's Nations League where teams are divided into leagues with promotion/relegation between the leagues at the end of each cycle.)	23rd
(Germany) 2029	To be determined														
Total	1/14	3	0	0	3	1	11	65	17	8	40	72	175	23rd	

*Draws include knockout matches decided by penalty kicks.

=== UEFA Women's Nations League ===
UEFA Women's Nations League record
Season	League	Group	Pos	Pld	W	D	L	GF	GA	P/R	RK
2023–24	B	1	3rd	8	3	2	3	12	14	*	26th
2025	B	1	2nd	8	2	2	4	6	15	*	24th
Total				16	5	4	7	18	29	26th and 24th	

▲	Promoted at end of season
Same position	No movement at end of season
▼	Relegated at end of season
*	Participated in promotion/relegation play-offs

== See also ==
- Northern Ireland women's national under-19 football team
- Northern Ireland women's national under-17 football team
- Northern Ireland national football team, the men's team
- Republic of Ireland women's national football team
