= Joely Andrews =

Northern Irish footballer

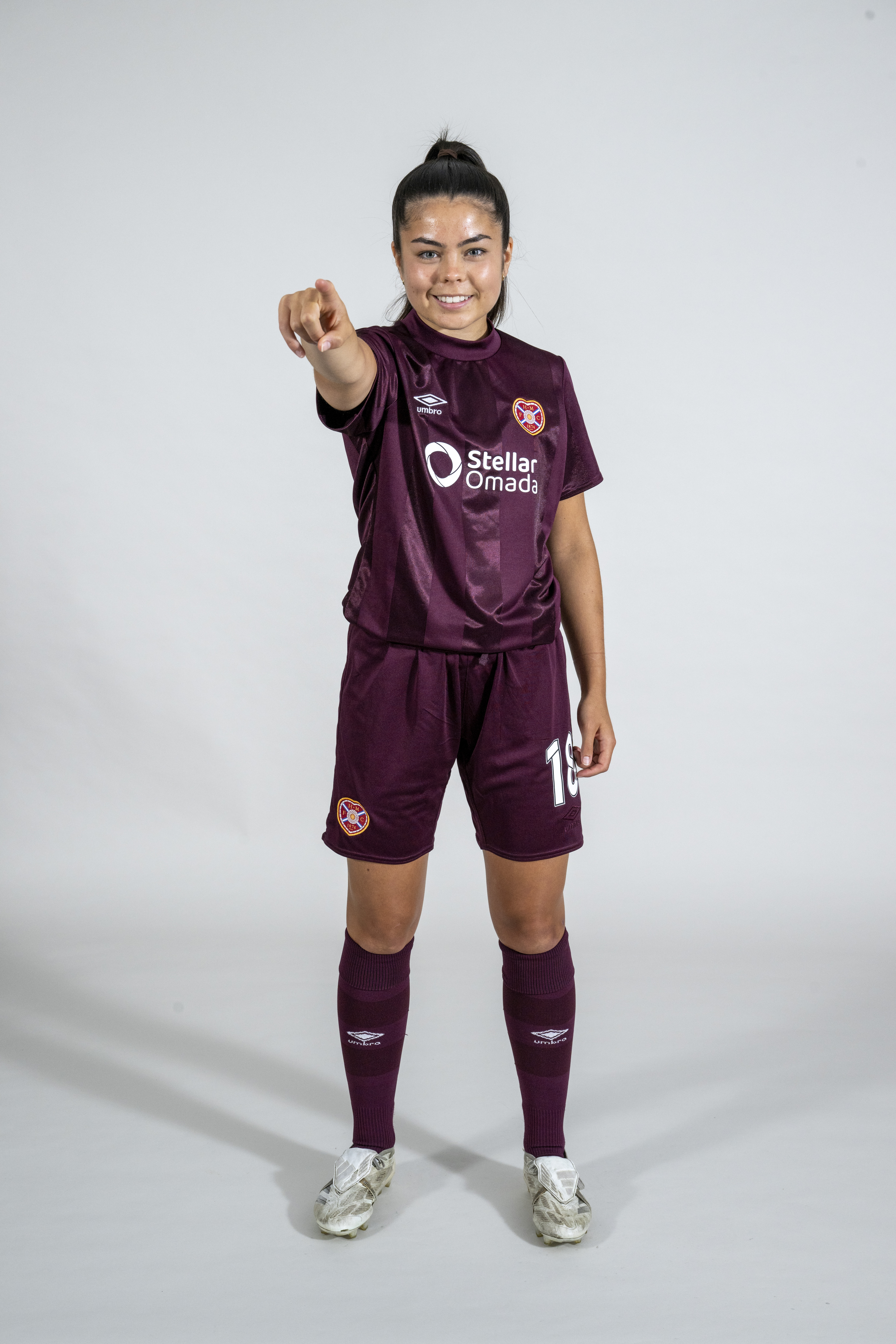

Personal information
- Full name: Joely Andrews
- Date of birth: 30 April 2002 (age 24)
- Place of birth: Northern Ireland
- Position: Midfielder

Team information
- Current team: Hibernian
- Number: 6

Senior career*
Years	Team	Apps	(Gls)
	Glentoran	83	(33)
2024–2026	Heart of Midlothian	0	(1)
2026–	Hibernian	0	(0)

International career^{‡}
2018–2019	Northern Ireland U-17	11	(0)
2019	Northern Ireland U-18	1	(0)
2020	Northern Ireland U-19	2	(0)
2020–	Northern Ireland	7	(1)
- * Club domestic league appearances and goals ‡ National team caps and goals as of 23:05, 13 July 2022 (UTC)

Joely Andrews (born 30 April 2002) is a Northern Irish footballer who plays as a midfielder for Scottish Women's Premier League side Hibernian and the Northern Ireland women's national team. She previously played for Glentoran, having joined their first ever Junior Academy age 8.

== Club career ==
=== Hearts ===
On 6 July 2024, Andrews joined Scottish Women's Premier League team Heart of Midlothian on a two-year deal from Glentoran, alongside teammate Kerry Beattie.

Andrews scored her first goal at Hearts on 18th August 2024 against Spartans Woman FC, adding to the 5-0 final score.

=== Hibernian ===
In July 2026, Andrews joined Hibernian on a two-year deal.

== International career ==
Andrews is a member of the Northern Ireland national team. On 10 September 2020, she received her first call up to the senior Northern Ireland team. She made her debut against the Faroe Islands on 18 September, coming on as a substitute.

Andrews was part of the squad that was called up to the UEFA Women's Euro 2022. She was named Women’s Player of the Year at the Ulster Footballer of the Year (UFOTY) Awards in 2022 Andrews has 25 caps for Northern Ireland.

== International goals ==
No.	Date	Venue	Opponent	Score	Result	Competition
1.	16 July 2024	Windsor Park, Belfast, Northern Ireland	Bosnia and Herzegovina	1–0	2–0	UEFA Women's Euro 2025 qualifying
2.	14 April 2026	Mourneview Park, Lurgan, Northern Ireland	Malta	2–0	4–0	2027 FIFA Women's World Cup qualification
