= Kerry Beattie =

Northern Irish footballer

Personal information
- Full name: Kerry Anne Beattie
- Date of birth: 27 September 2002 (age 24)
- Place of birth: Lisburn, Northern Ireland
- Height: 1.68 m (5 ft 6 in)
- Position: Forward

Team information
- Current team: Portsmouth
- Number: 9

Youth career
- Lisburn Ladies
- Glentoran

Senior career*
Years	Team	Apps	(Gls)
2019–2022	Glentoran	18	(27)
2022	Glasgow City	3	(5)
2022–2024	Glentoran	23	(45)
2024–2026	Heart of Midlothian		
2025-2026	Aberdeen (loan)	1	(2)
2026-	Portsmouth	0	(0)

International career^{‡}
2017–2019	Northern Ireland U17	8	(0)
2019	Northern Ireland U18	1	(0)
2019	Northern Ireland U19	1	(0)
2021–	Northern Ireland	10	(3)
- * Club domestic league appearances and goals as of 12 August 2024 ‡ National team caps and goals as of 1 June 2024

Kerry Anne Beattie (born 27 September 2002) is a Northern Irish association footballer who played as a forward for Heart of Midlothian, before going to Aberdeen on loan in January 2025. She also plays for the Northern Ireland women's national team.

She previously played for Glentoran and Glasgow City.

== Club career ==
Beattie has played for Glentoran in Northern Ireland. She joined the East Belfast club as a 13-year-old from Lisburn Ladies.

=== Glasgow City ===
In January 2022, Glentoran accepted a transfer bid for Beattie from Glasgow City, and she signed a three-and-a-half-year professional contract with the Scottish champions. The deal represented the first time a Northern Irish club had ever received a transfer fee for a female player.

=== Hearts ===
On 6 July 2024, Beattie signed a two-year deal with Scottish Women's Premier League team Heart of Midlothian for an undisclosed fee, joining alongside teammate Joely Andrews.

== International career ==
Beattie made her senior debut for Northern Ireland on 10 June 2021. She scored her first international goal on 29 November 2021.

=== International goals ===
No.	Date	Venue	Opponent	Score	Result	Competition
1.	29 November 2021	Seaview, Belfast, Northern Ireland	North Macedonia	9–0	9–0	2023 FIFA Women's World Cup qualification
2.	18 July 2023	Stadion v Městských sadech, Opava, Czech Republic	Czech Republic	2–0	2–0	Friendly
3.	5 December 2023	Windsor Park, Belfast, Northern Ireland	Republic of Ireland	1–5	1–6	2023–24 UEFA Women's Nations League
4.	12 June 2024	Centenary Stadium, Ta' Qali, Malta	Malta	2–0	2–0	UEFA Women's Euro 2025 qualifying

== Personal life ==
Beattie's uncle Peter Kennedy was also a footballer.
