= Enija Anna Vaivode =

Latvian footballer

Enija-Anna Vaivode
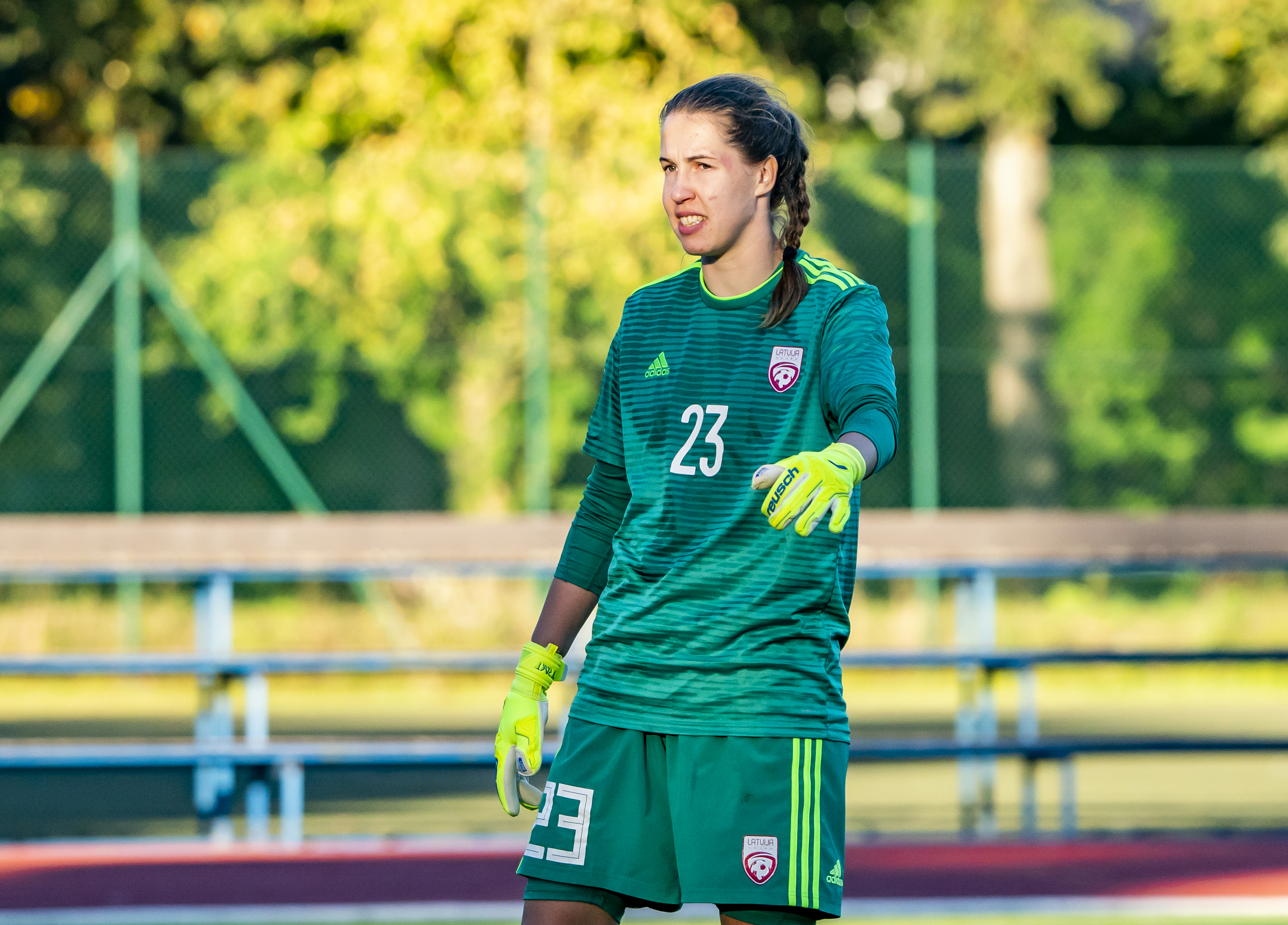
- Vaivode in 2022

Personal information
- Full name: Enija-Anna Vaivode
- Date of birth: 28 December 1993 (age 32)
- Place of birth: Latvia
- Position: Goalkeeper

Team information
- Current team: Riga FC

Youth career
- –2011: Rīgas FS

Senior career*
Years	Team	Apps	(Gls)
2011–2012	1. FC Union Berlin		
2012	FK Liepāja		(0)
2013	GBK Kokkola	22	
2014–2015	SC 07 Bad Neuenahr		
2019–2020	FK Dinamo Rīga		
2020	FK Auda		
2021–2022	Einherji		
2022–2023	P18 IK		
2024–	Riga FC		

International career
2008–2009	Latvia U17	6	(0)
2010–2011	Latvia U19	5	(0)
2013–	Latvia	28	(0)
- * Club domestic league appearances and goals

Enija-Anna Vaivode is a Latvian women's football goalkeeper currently playing for Riga FC women's team in the Latvian Women's League. She previously played for GBK Kokkola and SC 07 Bad Neuenahr.

She is the national team goalkeeper of the Latvian national team.
