= Emily Wilson (footballer) =

Northern Irish footballer (born 2001)

Personal information
- Full name: Emily Wilson
- Date of birth: 26 August 2001 (age 25)
- Place of birth: Northern Ireland,
- Position: Forward

Team information
- Current team: Crusaders Strikers
- Number: 11

Youth career
- 2011-2018: Glentoran

Senior career*
Years	Team	Apps	(Gls)
2018–2022	Crusaders Strikers	9	(8)
2023–2024	Glentoran	25	(17)

International career^{‡}
2017–2018	Northern Ireland U-17	3	(1)
2017	Northern Ireland U-19	3	(0)
2018–	Northern Ireland	33	(1)
- * Club domestic league appearances and goals as of 20 September 2023 ‡ National team caps and goals as of 10:58, 9 January 2026 (UTC)

Emily Wilson (born 26 August 2001) is a Northern Irish footballer who plays as a forward for Glentoran and the Northern Ireland national team.

== Playing career ==
=== Club ===
==== Crusaders Strikers F.C., 2018– ====
Since 2018, Wilson has played for Crusaders Strikers F.C. in Northern Ireland's Women's Premiership, the top women's league in the country. She was named the league's Player of the Month for November 2020.

=== International ===
Wilson has represented Northern Ireland on the under-17, under-19, and senior national teams. She made her debut for the Northern Ireland national team during a match against Belarus on 27 November 2020, starting the match.

Wilson was part of the squad that was called up to the UEFA Women's Euro 2022.

== Honors ==
- Women's Premiership Player of the Month: November 2020

== Personal life ==
Wilson grew up in Antrim and attended Parkhall College.
