= Arta Luīze Lubiņa =

Latvian footballer

Personal information
- Date of birth: 29 May 2004 (age 22)
- Position: Defender

Team information
- Current team: Metta

International career^{‡}
Years	Team	Apps	(Gls)
2019	Latvia U-17	9	(0)
2021–	Latvia U-19	2	(0)
2021–	Latvia	7	(0)
- ‡ National team caps and goals as of 15:53, 16 December 2021 (UTC)

Arta Luīze Lubiņa (born 29 May 2004) is a Latvian footballer who plays as a defender for Metta and the Latvia national team.

== International career ==
Lubiņa made her debut for the Latvia national team on 10 June 2021, coming on as a substitute for Liāna Rožaščonoka against Lithuania.
