= Julija Zivikj =

Macedonian footballer

Julija Živić
Personal information
- Date of birth: 29 October 2000 (age 26)
- Position: Defender

Team information
- Current team: Ljuboten

Senior career*
Years	Team	Apps	(Gls)
–2020	Dragon		
2020	Nea Salamina		
2020–	Ljuboten		

International career^{‡}
2015–2016	Macedonia U17	4	(0)
2018	Macedonia U19	3	(0)
2019–	North Macedonia	7	(0)
- * Club domestic league appearances and goals ‡ National team caps and goals as of 27 November 2020

Julija Zivikj (Macedonian: Јулија Зивиќ, Julija Zivić; born 29 October 2000) is a Macedonian footballer who plays as a defender for Cypriot club Ljuboten and the North Macedonia women's national team.
