= Katja Wienerroither =

Austrian footballer (born 2002)

Personal information
- Date of birth: 3 January 2002 (age 24)
- Place of birth: Austria,
- Height: 1.76 m (5 ft 9 in)
- Position: Forward

Team information
- Current team: RB Leipzig
- Number: 9

Youth career
- 2012–2017: USC Eugendorf
- 2018: Salzburg Mädchen

Senior career*
| Years | Team | Apps | (Gls) |
| 2016–2017 | USC Eugendorf | | |
| 2017–2019 | FC Bergheim | | |
| 2020–2021 | Sturm Graz | | |
| 2021-2023 | Grasshoppers | 11 | (5) |

International career^{‡}
| 2018–2019 | Austria U17 | 13 | (6) |
| 2019 | Austria U19 | 5 | (3) |
| 2020– | Austria | 13 | (2) |
- * Club domestic league appearances and goals ‡ National team caps and goals as of 23:40, 9 December 2022 (UTC)

Katja Wienerroither (born 3 January 2002) is an Austrian footballer who plays as a forward for Frauen-Bundesliga club RB Leipzig and the Austria women's national team.

== Club career ==
Wienerroither has played for USC Eugendorf, FC Bergheim and Sturm Graz in Austria.

== International career ==
Wienerroither made her senior debut for Austria on 6 March 2020.
