= Demi Vance =

Northern Irish footballer

Personal information
- Full name: Demi Vance
- Date of birth: 2 May 1991 (age 35)
- Place of birth: Northern Ireland,
- Height: 1.67 m (5 ft 6 in)
- Positions: Midfielder; left-back

Senior career*
Years	Team	Apps	(Gls)
2008–2014	Glentoran		
2014–2017	Northern Redbacks WSC		
2017–2020	Glentoran		
2020–2022	Rangers	39	(6)
2022–2023	Leicester City	4	(0)
2023–	Glentoran	25	(8)

International career^{‡}
2009–	Northern Ireland	89	(4)
- * Club domestic league appearances and goals as of 20 September 2023 ‡ National team caps and goals as of 20 September 2023

Demi Vance (born 2 May 1991) is a Northern Irish footballer who plays for Glentoran and the Northern Ireland women's national team. She has previously played as a midfielder for Leicester City in the WSL and Rangers in the Scottish Women's Premier League.

== International career ==
Vance has been capped for the Northern Ireland national team, appearing for the team during the 2019 FIFA Women's World Cup qualifying cycle.

Vance was part of the squad that was called up to the UEFA Women's Euro 2022.
