= Inver Park =

Football stadium in Larne, Northern Ireland

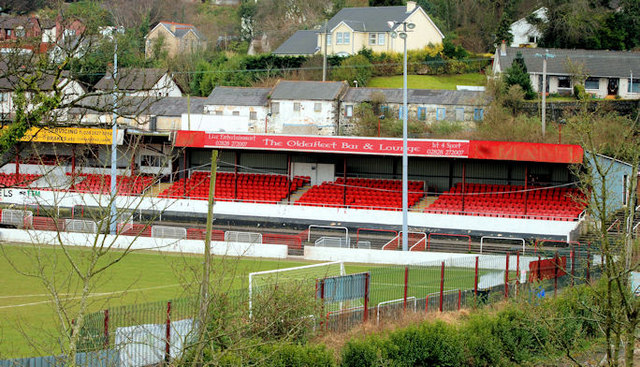
- Interactive map of Inver Park
- Location: Larne, County Antrim, Northern Ireland
- Coordinates: 54°51′0″N 5°49′37″W
- Capacity: 2,732
- Surface: Artificial
- Record attendance: 15,000 (Larne vs Linfield, 1972)

Construction
- Opened: 1918
- Renovated: 2018–2022

Tenants
- Larne; Larne Women; Newington (2023–2026)

Inver Park is a football stadium in Larne, County Antrim, Northern Ireland. It is the home ground of Larne. The land was acquired by Larne in 1918 and has been in continuous use as a stadium ever since. The stadium holds 2,732 with 1,632 seats.

In 2010 the club struck an agreement with property developers GML who agreed to build a new stadium on the site that would meet the Irish League's domestic licence criteria to enable Larne to play senior football should they win the Championship One in the future in return for Larne's agreement to give up an acre of land adjacent to a development site next to the ground. The deal, however, has been delayed due to the falling value of the property market, which has led GML to halve their initial bid of £6 million for the land.

Under the ownership of Kenny Bruce, the stadium has received several upgrades; in 2018, the Main Stand was lightly renovated, a new artificial pitch and floodlights were installed, while a new 600-seat stand at the Bleach Green end of the ground was built in advance of the 2019–20 NIFL Premiership season. In December 2020 construction began on another 600-seat stand at the church end of the ground, which was expected to conclude by Spring 2021. The final stage of stadium development is due to include the construction of an all-new Main Stand and community hub, the timeframe of which is as-yet unscheduled.
