= Glentoran W.F.C. =

Women's football club in Northern Ireland

Glentoran Women
- Full name: Glentoran Women Football Club
- Founded: 1985
- Ground: The Oval
- Capacity: 6,500
- Manager: Billy Clarke
- Head Coach: Kim Turner
- GK Coach: Darren Fox
- Coach: Steven Patterson
- League: Women's Premiership
- 2025: Champions
Home colours	Away colours

Glentoran Women Football Club is a women's football club from Belfast, Northern Ireland and a subsidiary of Glentoran Football Club.

The team holds the record as the most successful women's team in the Irish League, having won the Women's Premiership on eleven occasions, most recently in 2025. Having won all four major trophies in the 2020 season, the team was victorious again in the 2021 season, retaining the Irish League, Irish Cup, County Antrim Shield and League Cup to become the first team to ever hold all four trophies, and the first team to retain all four.

== 2022 Season ==
As the Northern Ireland Women's Premiership season runs from April to October, the 2022 season was disrupted by the Women's International European Championships held in England during the summer. For the first time in their history, Northern Ireland qualified for the tournament, with a squad including four Glentoran players. This resulted in the players being unavailable for club selection from the start of the season until the tournament had ended in July.

Glentoran suffered two major setbacks, losing forwards Caragh Hamilton through injury and Lauren Wade who signed for Reading in the English Women's Superleague following an impressive European Championship. Despite beating Cliftonville in the final game of the league season, Glentoran struggled to regain the fluidity that had brought success in previous seasons, with Cliftonville going on to win the first league title in their history.

Having won the County Antrim Cup against Crusaders at the Danny Blanchflower stadium a few weeks earlier, Glentoran faced Sion Swifts in the Irish Cup Final on 5 November 2023. Glentoran captain Jessica Foy put the East Belfast side ahead with a free kick that dipped over the goalkeepers head, before Joely Andrews was played through to make the final score 2-0 to Glentoran. Speaking after the game, Glentoran forward Kerry Beattie said that 'whilst we're pleased to retain these two trophies, after the success of the last few seasons we end this season disappointed'.

== 2023 Season ==
During the off-season the club expanded its support team to include a specialist strength and conditioning coach, nutritionist, head of media and match day coordinator. On the field the club signed Northern Ireland internationals Demi Vance in defence and Emily Wilson in attack. With days to go before the opening league game of the season, the club announced Northern Ireland U17 international goalkeeper Ellie Scott had also signed for Glentoran. Glentoran started the season strongly and with Cliftonville's participation in the All Ireland final and UEFA Champions League, Glentoran move six points clear at the top of the Christmas over the summer month. Cliftonville were then defeated by their North Belfast rivals and when Glentoran beat their rivals Linfield at Midgley Park, the team from East Belfast moved 9 points clear at the top of the table. Glentoran could have won the league season outright with two games to spare had they beaten Cliftonville at home, but a 1-1 draw meant the league title was secured less than a week later at Seaview with a 0-3 win over Crusaders. Glentoran went on to finish an unbeaten league season at home to rivals Linfield in the final game of the season, two Demi Vance goals the difference on the night. And so Glentoran added another league title to their collection, with Northern Ireland Kerry Beattie winning the league's golden boot award with twenty eight goals in eighteen games.

== European record ==
In UEFA competitions Glentoran went without a win in their first three attempts. In the 2009–10 Champions League qualifying round they won their first game 2–0 against Roma Calfa but failed to qualify from their group. In the 2024 edition of the competition held in Paphos, Cyprus, Glentoran drew Slovenian champions ZNK Mura Nona. The team conceded two soft goals in the first half and went further behind early in the second half when Mura Nona converted a penalty kick to make it 3-0. This was the catalyst for Glentoran to spark to life and goals from Chloe McCarron and a calmly slotted penalty from Demi Vance put Glentoran back into the tie with 10 minutes remaining. It was too little too late however as the game finished 3-2 to the Slovenians.

In the second game of the round 1 mini tournament Glentoran played Armenian champions Pyunik. A first half goal from Emily Wilson, playing in her first European tournament was enough for Glentoran to win the tie 1-0.

=== Matches ===
Competition	Season	Round	Opponent	Home	Away	Aggregate
UEFA Women's Cup	2005–06	First qualifying round	(France) Montpellier	0-8		4th
UEFA Women's Cup	2005–06	First qualifying round	(Portugal) 1.º de Dezembro	0-7		4th
UEFA Women's Cup	2005–06	First qualifying round	(Wales) Cardiff City	0-3		4th
UEFA Women's Cup	2007–08	First qualifying round	(Switzerland) Zuchwil	1-5		4th
UEFA Women's Cup	2007–08	First qualifying round	(England) Everton	0-11		4th
UEFA Women's Cup	2007–08	First qualifying round	(Lithuania) Gintra-Universitetas	1-2		4th
UEFA Women's Cup	2008–09	First qualifying round	(Romania) Clujana	0-6		4th
UEFA Women's Cup	2008–09	First qualifying round	(Kazakhstan) Alma	0-8		4th
UEFA Women's Cup	2008–09	First qualifying round	(Croatia) Osijek	1-1		4th
UEFA Women's Champions League	2009–10	First qualifying round	(Romania) CFF Clujana	0-1		3rd
UEFA Women's Champions League	2009–10	First qualifying round	(Sweden) Linköping	0-3		3rd
UEFA Women's Champions League	2009–10	First qualifying round	(Moldova) Roma Calfa	2-0		3rd
UEFA Women's Champions League	2012–13	First qualifying round	(Portugal) 1° Dezembro	0-4		3rd
UEFA Women's Champions League	2012–13	First qualifying round	(Romania) Olimpia Cluj	2-4		3rd
UEFA Women's Champions League	2012–13	First qualifying round	(Malta) Birkirkara	3-1		3rd
UEFA Women's Champions League	2014–15	First qualifying round	(Ukraine) Zhytlobud Kharkiv	0-5		3rd
UEFA Women's Champions League	2014–15	First qualifying round	(Scotland) Glasgow City	0-1		3rd
UEFA Women's Champions League	2014–15	First qualifying round	(Slovakia) Nové Zámky	5-2		3rd
UEFA Women's Champions League	2015–16	First qualifying round	(Greece) PAOK	0-4		3rd
UEFA Women's Champions League	2015–16	First qualifying round	(Bulgaria) NSA Sofia	1-2		3rd
UEFA Women's Champions League	2015–16	First qualifying round	(North Macedonia) ŽFK Dragon 2014	2-0		3rd
UEFA Women's Champions League	2021–22	First qualifying round	(Switzerland) Servette Chênois	0-1		3rd
UEFA Women's Champions League	2021–22	First qualifying round	(Romania) Olimpia Cluj	2-0		3rd
UEFA Women's Champions League	2022–23	First qualifying round	(Romania) Olimpia Cluj	0-0		4th
UEFA Women's Champions League	2022–23	First qualifying round	(Malta) Birkirkara	1-2		4th
UEFA Women's Champions League	2045–25	First qualifying round	(Slovenia) ŽNK Mura	2-3		3rd
UEFA Women's Champions League	2045–25	First qualifying round	(Armenia) FC Pyunik	1-0		3rd
UEFA Women's Champions League	2026–27	First qualifying round	(Latvia) Riga FC	1-4		3rd
UEFA Women's Champions League	2026–27	First qualifying round	(Armenia) FC Pyunik	4-2		3rd

== Titles ==
Women's Premiership
Winners (11): 2004, 2006, 2007, 2008, 2011, 2013, 2014, 2020, 2021, 2023, 2025
IFA Women's Challenge Cup
Winners (12): 2006, 2007, 2008, 2009, 2010, 2012, 2018, 2019, 2021, 2022, 2023, 2026
NIFL Women's Premiership League Cup
Winners (1): 2019
County Antrim Cup
Winners (6): 2018, 2019, 2020, 2021, 2022, 2024

== Current squad ==
The squad for the 2024 season was announced on the club's social media channels and is below.

Note: Flags indicate national team as defined under FIFA eligibility rules; some limited exceptions apply. Players may hold more than one non-FIFA nationality.

No.	Pos.	Nation	Player
1	GK	NIR	Ashleigh McKinnon
2	DF	NIR	Annie Timoney
3	DF	NIR	Jessica Foy
4	DF	NIR	Emma McMaster
5	DF	NIR	Sofie Keenan
6	MF	NIR	Nadene Caldwell
7	DF	NIR	Aimee Kerr
8	FW	NIR	Demi Vance
9	DF	NIR	Rachel Rogan
10	FW	NIR	Ellie Butler
11	FW	NIR	Emily Wilson

No.	Pos.	Nation	Player
12	GK	NIR	Ellie Scott
14	DF	NIR	Aimee Neal
18	FW	NIR	Kascie Weir
20	FW	NIR	Rachel McIntyre
21	DF	NIR	Kelly Bailie
22	DF	NIR	Megan Neill
23	MF	NIR	Jenna McKearney
24	DF	NIR	Sarah Tweedie
26	DF	NIR	Kelly Crompton
97	MF	NIR	Chloe McCarron
