= Ellie Scott =

Northern Irish footballer (born 2006)

Personal information
- Full name: Ellie Olivia Scott
- Date of birth: 10 January 2006 (age 20)
- Place of birth: Lisburn, Northern Ireland
- Height: 1.73 m (5 ft 8 in)
- Position: Goalkeeper

Team information
- Current team: Glentoran
- Number: 12

Senior career*
| Years | Team | Apps | (Gls) |
| 2023– | Glentoran | | |

International career
| | Northern Ireland U16 | 4 | (0) |
| 2021–2023 | Northern Ireland U17 | 6 | (0) |
- * Club domestic league appearances and goals

Ellie Olivia Scott (born 10 January 2006) is a Northern Irish professional footballer who plays as a goalkeeper for Glentoran and the Northern Ireland under-19 national team.

== Life ==
Scott was born in Lisburn, Northern Ireland. She started playing football at age ten. She is educated at Banbridge Academy.

== Club career ==
Scott started her career at Lisburn FC. After covid lockdown, Scott joined Lisburn Rangers FC, with whom she won the NIWFA Division 1 2022 season without conceding a single goal.

She also won the 2022 NIWFA PWC SuperCup, defeating Larne FC 2–0 in the final.

In March 2023, she was awarded the Sports Inspire Awards at Belfast City Hall by the Irish Football Association for volunteering as a coach for young players and showing "how young people can inspire their peers."

In April 2023, Scott joined Glentoran to play in the Premiership alongside her international teammates Olivia Canavan, Rachel McIntyre, and Kascie Weir, as well as Northern Ireland internationals Nadene Caldwell, Chloe McCarron, and Joely Andrews. She debuted on 23 April 2023 in an 11–0 victory over Derry City, keeping a clean sheet.

== International career ==
After playing for the U16 Northern Ireland team, Scott was called up to the Northern Ireland U17 national team. She debuted on 10 March 2022 in a U17 qualifier against Luxembourg held in Israel and won player of the match. With her team she won Group B1 of the 2022 UEFA Under-17 Championship qualification and Group B5 of the 2023 UEFA Under-17 Championship qualifications.

She is coached by Northern Ireland national cap record holder Julie Nelson.
