= Emma McMaster =

Northern Irish footballer

Personal information
- Date of birth: 9 March 1999 (age 27)
- Place of birth: Northern Ireland
- Position: Defender

Team information
- Current team: Glentoran
- Number: 4

Senior career*
Years	Team	Apps	(Gls)
–201?	Newry City		
201?–2019	Cliftonville		
2019–	Glentoran		

International career^{‡}
2014–2015	Northern Ireland U17	6	(1)
2017	Northern Ireland U19	4	(0)
	Northern Ireland U19 (futsal)	3	(0)
2016–	Northern Ireland	6	(0)
- * Club domestic league appearances and goals ‡ National team caps and goals as of 10 March 2020

Emma McMaster (born 9 March 1999) is a Northern Irish association footballer who plays as a midfielder for Women's Premiership club Glentoran and the Northern Ireland women's national team.
