= Philadelphia Athletics 18, Cleveland Indians 17 (1932) =

Major League Baseball game

Philadelphia Athletics at Cleveland Indians
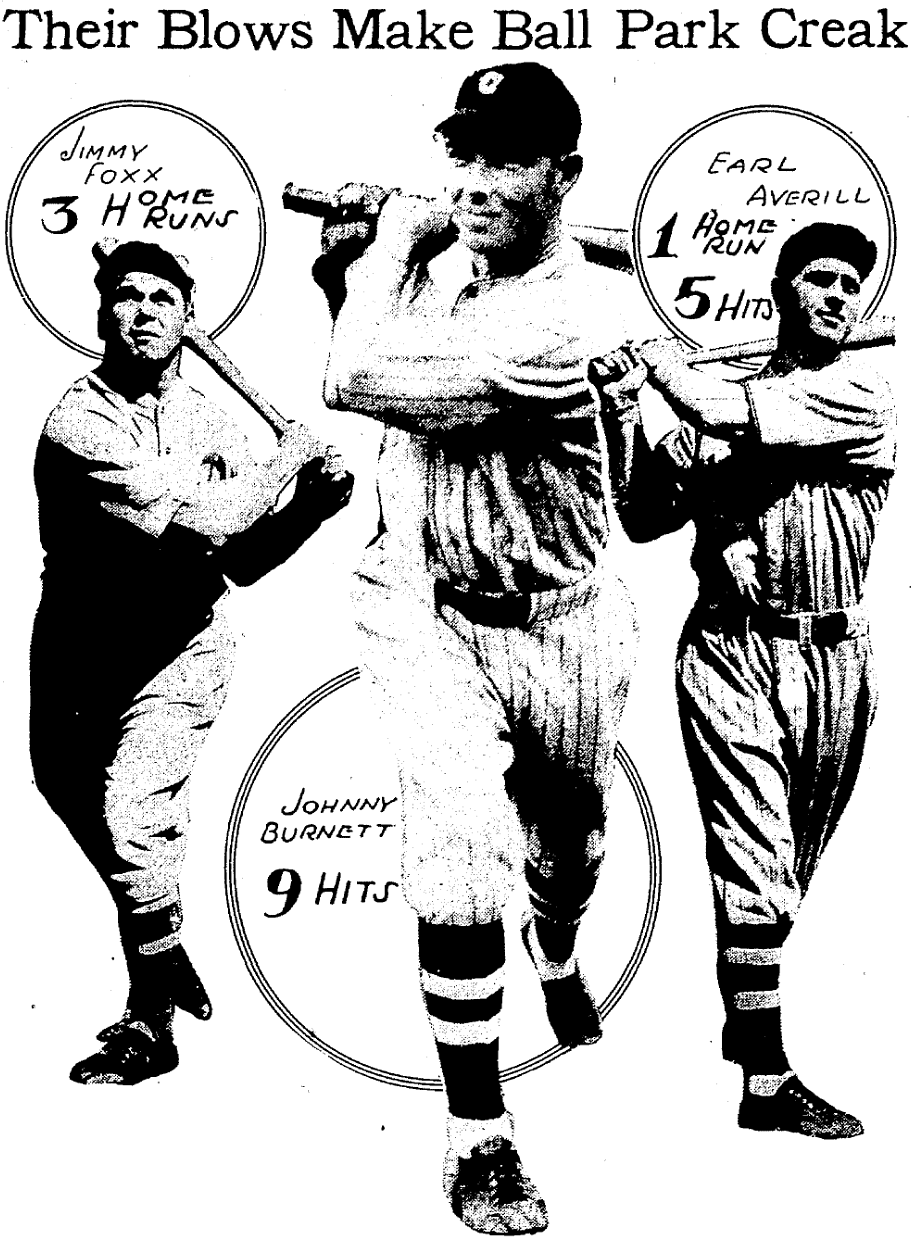
PHL	CLE
18	17
- 18 innings
	1	2	3	4	5	6	7	8	9	10	11	12	13	14	15	16	17	18	R	H	E
PHL	2	0	1	2	0	1	7	0	2	0	0	0	0	0	0	2	0	1	18	25	1
CLE	3	0	3	0	1	1	6	0	1	0	0	0	0	0	0	2	0	0	17	33	5
- Date: July 10, 1932
- Venue: League Park
- City: Cleveland
- Managers: Connie Mack (PHL); Roger Peckinpaugh (CLE)
- Umpires: HP: George Hildebrand; Brick Owens
- Attendance: 10,000 (estimated)
- Time of game: 4:05

On July 10, 1932, the Philadelphia Athletics beat the Cleveland Indians 18–17 in 18 innings in a Major League Baseball game played at League Park in Cleveland. Several major-league records were set during the game; for example, Johnny Burnett of the Indians became the only player to hit safely nine (or even eight) times in a game, while Cleveland's 33 hits and the teams' combined 58 hits are also single-game records. Pitcher Eddie Rommel secured the win for the Athletics, pitching an American League-record 17 innings in relief after Philadelphia's Lew Krausse gave up three runs in the first inning. The 29 hits Rommel allowed are a major-league record; the 14 runs against him are the most given up by a winning pitcher.

Coming into the game, the Athletics, who were the three-time defending American League champions, trailed the New York Yankees in the standings by 7 1/2 games. Sunday baseball was still illegal in Philadelphia, forcing the Athletics to make one-game road trips on some Sundays, including July 10. With his pitching staff exhausted by six games in the previous three days, the owner and manager of the Athletics, Connie Mack, took only two pitchers on the train trip to Cleveland, giving the rest of the staff the day off. With no chance of being relieved except by a position player, Rommel pitched with mixed effectiveness, giving up six runs in the seventh inning but only two runs in the final nine innings of the game. He aided his own cause by getting three hits in seven at bats. Cleveland's Wes Ferrell took the loss after Jimmie Foxx got his sixth hit of the game and then scored. Foxx had already batted in eight runs, having hit three home runs and accumulated sixteen total bases, tying a record that has since been broken.

The victory brought the Athletics to within six games of the Yankees, but they came no closer. Philadelphia finished the season in second place, and the Athletics did not win the pennant again for forty years. Neither Krausse nor Rommel pitched in the major leagues after 1932. The July 10 game was the 171st victory of Rommel's MLB career; he never won another major league game.

== Background ==
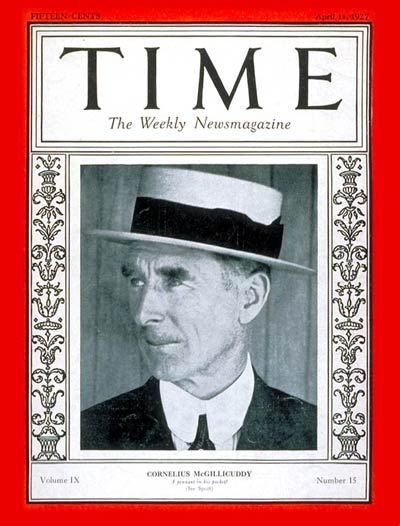
Mack on a magazine cover, 1927

The 1932 Philadelphia Athletics were the three-time defending American League champions, winners of the 1929 and 1930 World Series, and were owned and managed by Connie Mack. The success did not translate to the balance sheet, however, as the Depression led to declining attendance. Successful players expected to be paid well, and Mack had lost a considerable amount of money in the 1929 stock market crash. The Cleveland Indians, on the other hand, had not won a World Series since 1920. By the late 1920s, they were under new ownership, who were determined to spend freely to acquire talent, and after a seventh-place finish in 1928, finished in the top half of the American League standings the next seven years. In 1928, the voters of Cleveland had approved the construction of a new stadium with 78,000 seats, the largest baseball stadium built to that point. At the time of the July 10, 1932 game, it was within three weeks of opening. In the meantime, the Indians played all home games at League Park.

By early July 1932, the Athletics were in second place in the American League, behind the New York Yankees. The schedule called for the Athletics to play doubleheaders at their home field, Shibe Park, each day from Thursday, July 7 to Saturday, July 9, against the Chicago White Sox. The Athletics won four of six of those games, and were 7 1/2 games behind the Yankees at the end of play on July 9.

The Indians were to play a five-game series on those dates at the Washington Senators, with doubleheaders Thursday and Saturday. Cleveland won four out of those five games to advance from fifth to fourth in the American League. Both the Athletics and Indians were then to travel to League Park in Cleveland for a single game Sunday, before both teams went to Shibe Park to begin a four-game series with a Monday doubleheader. Thus, the Athletics were to play nine games in five days, and the Indians eight.

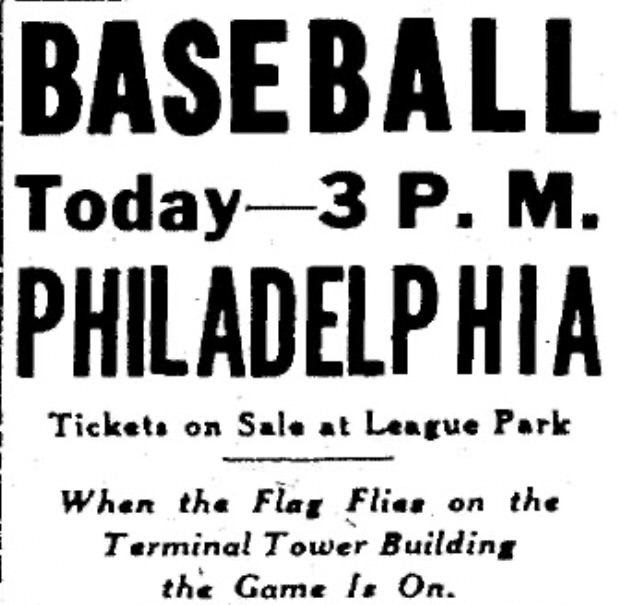
Advertisement for tickets for the July 10, 1932 game

The single game in Cleveland was necessitated because until the 1934 season, Sunday baseball was illegal in Pennsylvania. Thus, the Athletics and other Pennsylvania teams were required to play road games out of the state on Sundays. The Athletics had played a single Sunday home game in 1926 to test the law, but it had been upheld by the Pennsylvania Supreme Court. The previous Sunday, July 3, the Athletics had gone to Washington to play a one-game series against the Senators.

It was not unusual for teams on such one-day road trips to give some players the day off, in part to economize on train tickets, and Mack took only two pitchers with him to Cleveland, Lew Krausse and Eddie Rommel. Another reason for giving the rest of the pitching staff the day off was their exhaustion after three doubleheaders in as many days. The two pitchers were the team's only relief pitchers: Krausse was a rookie, and Rommel a 12-year veteran in his final season. Rommel, who had pitched five innings over the previous two days, was surprised to be asked to come to Cleveland. Mack also gave two position players the day off. One of them was Mickey Cochrane, his starting catcher, though he included two other catchers among the eleven players he took to Cleveland. According to Sam Otis, sports editor of the Cleveland Plain Dealer, in reporting on the game, Cleveland manager Roger Peckinpaugh was nearly as bad off for pitching as was Mack. The Indians allowed a half dozen players to skip the one-day trip to Cleveland.

== The game ==
=== First through sixth innings ===
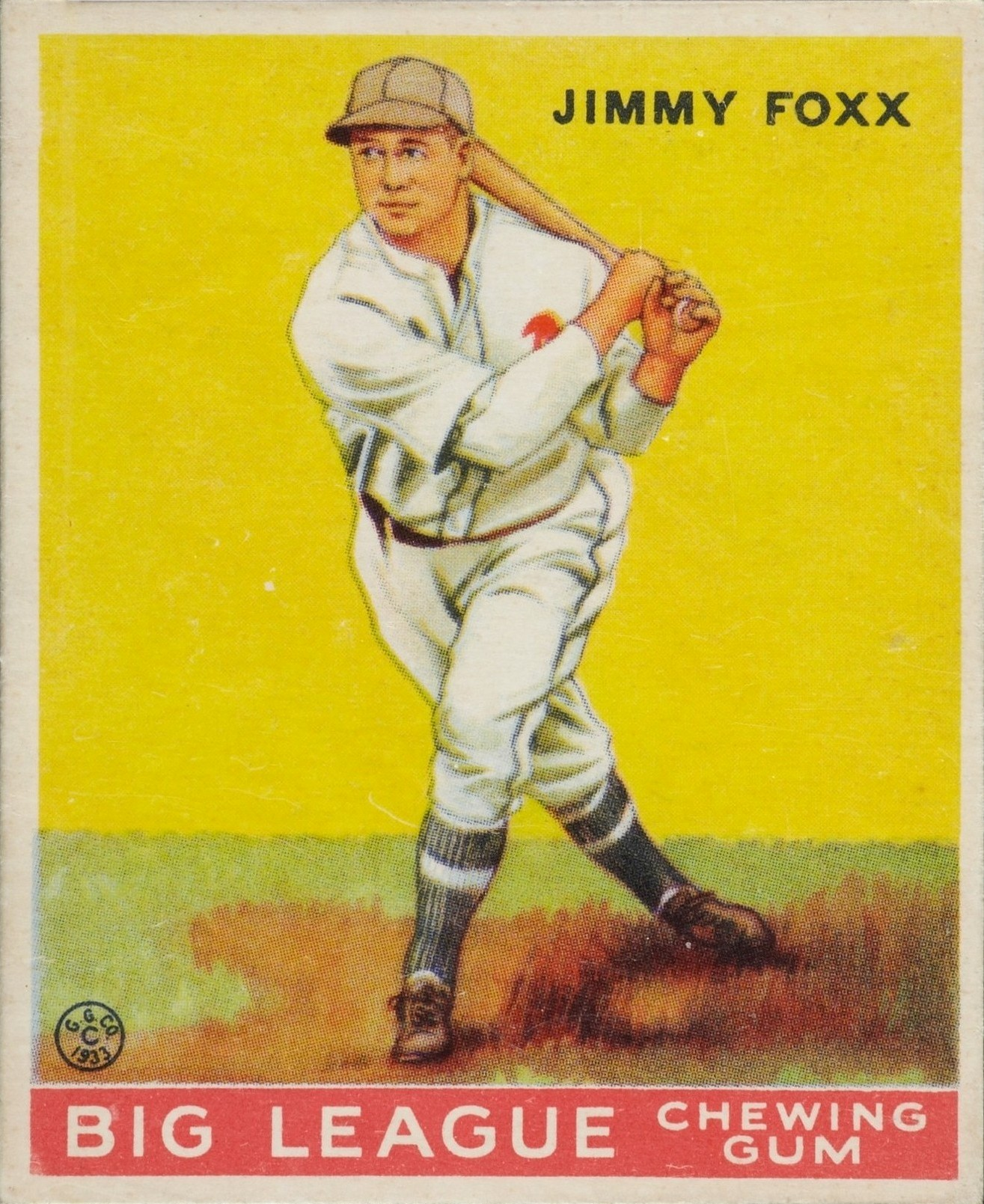
Jimmie Foxx hit three home runs for the Athletics in the game.

About 10,000 fans came to League Park for the game, which began at 3 p.m. Rommel pitched batting practice for the Athletics, while Krausse was the starting pitcher; Clint Brown started for Cleveland. Brown got off to a shaky start, giving up two runs due to three Athletics hits and his own throwing error. The Indians scored three runs in the bottom of the first inning on a home run by Earl Averill, putting them up 3–2. Mack allowed Krausse to hit in the top of the second inning as the team lacked any pinch hitters other than the one spare catcher, then sent Rommel to the mound for the bottom of the second inning. Neither team scored in that inning. In the top of the third, Brown gave up a solo home run to slugger Jimmie Foxx, his 31st of the season, to tie the score.

Rommel walked with two outs in the top of the fourth inning, sparking a Philadelphia rally: three singles scored two Athletics runs, making the score 5–3 Philadelphia. In the bottom of the inning, however, Cleveland converted three hits, two walks, and a wild pitch from Rommel, into three runs to take the lead 6–5. Philadelphia failed to score in the top of the fifth, leaving two men on base who had reached on a hit and an error, and Brown led off the bottom of the fifth with a hit. Shortstop Johnny Burnett, who had already singled in the first, second and fourth innings, scored Brown with a double to make the score 7–5 Indians. Mule Haas led off the top of the sixth with a double, and came around to score on a single by Al Simmons, cutting the Indians lead to 7–6. In the bottom of the sixth, two hits led to one Indians run, extending the lead to 8–6.

=== Seventh through ninth innings ===
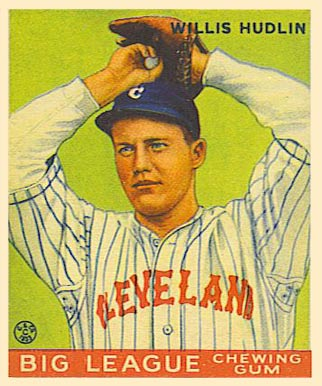
Willis Hudlin entered the game in the seventh inning, and walked both batters he faced.

In the top of the seventh, Dib Williams tripled with two out, and was brought home by a single by Rommel, cutting Cleveland's lead to 8–7. Willis Hudlin replaced Brown on the mound, and walked the next two batters to load the bases. The fans booed Peckinpaugh, who was coaching first base, disagreeing with the choice of Hudlin as relief pitcher. Otis stated that Brown "was obviously not himself" and that Hudlin was "helpless" in getting the ball over the plate. The manager then sent in Wes Ferrell to pitch. Ferrell, the ace of the Cleveland staff, had pitched a complete game on Friday, two days before. Jimmy Dykes cleared the bases with a double to give the Athletics a 10–7 lead. Simmons then singled and Foxx hit a two-run home run, his second of the game, to make the score 13–7 Athletics.

Burnett led off the seventh with his fifth hit of the game; three more Cleveland hits followed, cutting the lead to 13–11. Mack called time, and the reporters in the press box speculated he would relieve Rommel, sending in Dykes, the third baseman, to complete the game, as Dykes had been called upon to do in 1926 and 1927. Instead, Mack replaced the catcher, sending in Ed Madjeski for Johnnie Heving. This one change of catchers, along with the three pitching changes, were the only substitutions in the game as each team used only eleven players–Philadelphia had brought only eleven players. Otis suggested that the change in catchers might have led to Rommel's increased effectiveness in the upcoming innings.

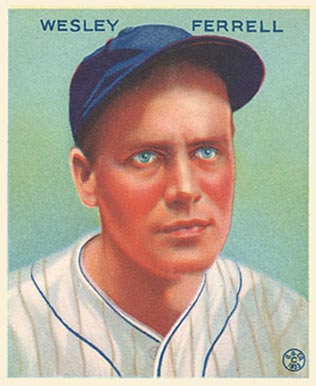
Cleveland's Wes Ferrell entered the game in the seventh inning, and pitched 11 1/3 innings.

When play resumed, Glenn Myatt walked to put runners on first and second. Then Bill Cissell attempted a sacrifice bunt, but popped the ball into the air towards Rommel. Seeing a chance at a double play, Rommel deliberately did not catch the ball, then threw towards second base. The ball went into center field, however, and a run scored, cutting the lead to 13–12. Rommel threw his cap in disgust. He had planned what to do in that situation for years, but when the opportunity arrived, he muffed it. Two more runs followed on a single by Dick Porter before Rommel could strike out Burnett to end the inning, but Cleveland now led 14–13. With Cleveland now in the lead, the fans cheered Peckinpaugh for several minutes.

There was no scoring in the eighth inning, and Ferrell retired the first two batters in the top of the ninth. With Philadelphia down to its final out, Dykes hit a ground ball towards first base, which should have ended the game. Instead, the ball went through the legs of first baseman Ed Morgan, and Dykes was safe. Simmons walked, and Foxx hit the ball down the left field line for a double. The ball became lodged against the bench in the bullpen, and two runs scored, giving Philadelphia a 15–14 lead.

Willie Kamm led off the bottom of the ninth for Cleveland with a double. Ferrell struck out and Porter hit a sacrifice fly to right field, sending Kamm to third base. Burnett got an infield hit, his sixth hit of the game, with the throw to home plate too late, tying the game at 15–15. Averill singled to send Burnett to third base, and advanced to second on defensive indifference. Joe Vosmik sent a fly ball to center field that looked like the game winner, but Haas made a spectacular catch to retire the side and send the game to extra innings.

=== Extra innings ===
In the stands nobody moved to get home to supper. They were glued to their seats, their voices gone down to hoarse, unhuman sounds, their pulses racing, their temperatures gone into fever. Just one run!

The fourteenth inning was scoreless. The fever rose on.

The fifteenth inning was scoreless. Getting on to "bed time" now. Croaking voices begged in vain for one more run, but the Indians went out before Rommel's speed ball.

— Cleveland Plain Dealer, "Indians lose 58-hit game; 10,000 groan". July 11, 1932, p. 15.

With the teams having scored thirty runs in the first nine innings, they scored none in the next six, as Rommel and Ferrell matched each other inning for inning. According to baseball historian Lee Allen, "Rommel must have wondered what he had to do to earn his pay check". To that end, he singled with two outs in the top of the tenth, but was out trying to extend it to a double. Outside League Park on Lexington Avenue, streetcars sat empty, waiting to transport the crowd home, but the fans remained in their seats in the ballpark.

In the top of the eleventh, Simmons singled and Foxx walked; a groundout sent Simmons to third base but he was stranded there when the third out was made. In the bottom half of the inning, Burnett got his seventh hit, a double, tying the major league record set by Wilbert Robinson in 1891. This was with one out; following an intentional walk to Averill, Vosmik hit into a double play to retire the side. In the bottom of the twelfth, Morgan doubled, and with one out, Cissell singled, but Morgan was tagged out at home plate. Kamm grounded out to end the threat. Burnett's eighth hit, a single, in the bottom of the thirteenth, went for naught as he was left on first base.

Dykes singled to lead off the top of the sixteenth. He was forced at second by Simmons. This brought Foxx to the plate; he hit his third home run of the game, his 33rd of the season, giving Philadelphia a 17–15 lead. The runs in the sixteenth were the only runs that Philadelphia scored with fewer than two outs. In the bottom of the sixteenth, Porter doubled and was sent to third by Burnett's ninth hit of the game. An Averill sacrifice fly cut the lead to 17–16, and Morgan tied it with a single to drive in Burnett. Myatt grounded out, and with two outs, Cissell sent a long fly ball to center field, but Haas made another game-saving catch with his back against the fence.

Philadelphia went in order in the top of the seventeenth inning; Kamm walked in the bottom of the inning and got as far as second on a sacrifice bunt from Ferrell, but Rommel retired the next two batters to end the inning.

In the top of the eighteenth, Ferrell retired the first two batters. Foxx singled, and Eric McNair hit a drive into center field which took an unexpected bounce over Vosmik's head. Although McNair was thrown out trying to stretch a double into a triple, Foxx had scored, and Philadelphia led 18–17. In the bottom of the inning, Rommel struck out two batters and retired the side in order, ending the game. The game had lasted four hours and five minutes. Had neither team scored, the game would have continued until nightfall put an end to it. Cleveland left 24 men on base; Philadelphia left 15. If Rommel averaged three pitches for each of the 87 batters he faced, he would have thrown 261 pitches, but he probably threw more than that.

== Records set ==
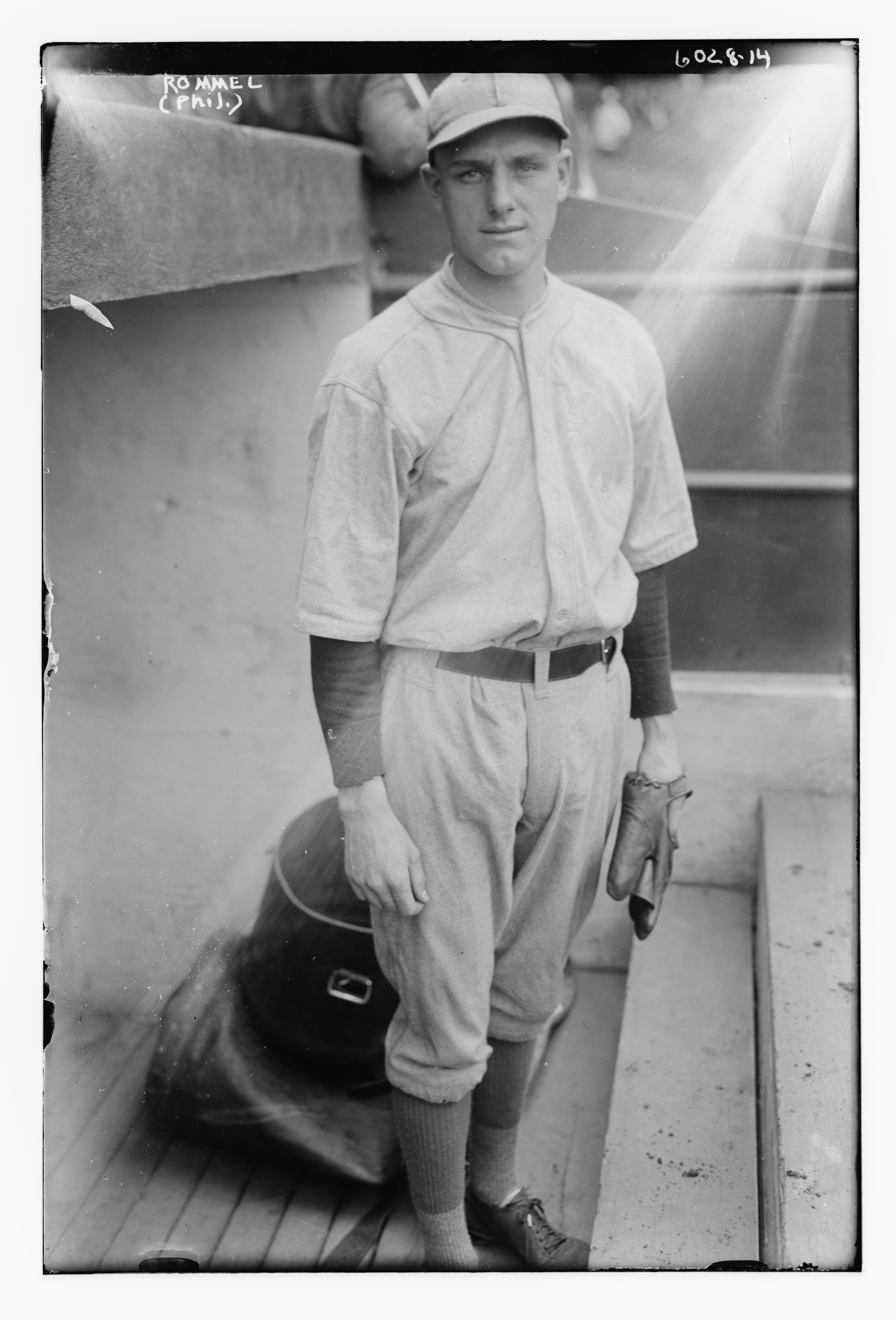
Eddie Rommel won his final victory in the major leagues despite giving up fourteen runs.

Burnett's nine hits in a game, Cleveland's 33 hits and the 58 hits by the two teams combined, set Major League records that still stand as of 2027. No other player has had more than seven hits in a game, and Burnett's seven singles are also a record. Foxx's sixteen total bases tied a Major League record that was surpassed by Gil Hodges of the Brooklyn Dodgers in 1950. Sixteen total bases remained the AL record until bettered by Josh Hamilton of the Texas Rangers in 2012, and it remains the record for a player for the Athletics franchise.

Rommel set Major League records by allowing 29 hits in a game, and for the most runs given up by a winning pitcher (fourteen). He also gave up the most bases on balls of any relief pitcher in MLB history, nine. It was the fifth game in Rommel's career in which he allowed fifteen or more hits, and he won all of them.

Rommel set what is still (as of 2027) the American League record for longest relief appearance with seventeen innings. He did not beat the Major League record of 18 1/3 innings for a relief appearance, set by Zip Zabel of the Chicago Cubs in 1915. The two teams tied an American League record with 35 combined runs scored; this was surpassed in 1950 when the Boston Red Sox defeated the Athletics, 22–14, at Fenway Park. The game was at the time the highest-scoring extra innings game in Major League history; this was bested on May 17, 1979, when the Philadelphia Phillies defeated the Cubs at Wrigley Field, 23–22 in ten innings. The July 10, 1932 game is the only one in Major League history to have five players get five or more base hits each: Burnett, Averill, Morgan, Simmons and Foxx.

== Reaction ==
Allen recorded, writing thirty years later, "What a game it turned out to be!" The North American Newspaper Alliance reported that "for eighteen innings, two never-say-die, if somewhat groggy and erratic, ball teams, had refused to quit". Gayle Talbot of the Associated Press called the game "one of the most spectacular long-distance victories in baseball history ... a game the likes of which won't be seen once in a blue moon". Sam Otis, sports editor of the Cleveland Plain Dealer, wrote that McNair's hit "took a pesky hop into the setting rays of Old Sol to give the Philadelphia Athletics an eighteen-inning triumph over a never-say-die band of Indians in the most dramatic diamond struggle in Cleveland history".

Mack stated that the Sunday victory in Cleveland "looked to be our best day so far of the season". The manager related that "Rommel had to go 17 innings to win and how he stood it is beyond me. Yet he outpitched Ferrell, the Cleveland ace." Mack also stated that Foxx "hit three extremely long home runs, all into Cleveland's far-off left field bleachers".

The Chicago Tribune noted the many batting records set in a game it deemed "one of the most remarkable in major league history", but also noted that Rommel and Ferrell had, in extra innings, given a "remarkable exhibition of pitching". Murray Robinson of the Brooklyn Times-Union mentioned Burnett's record of nine hits and stated that it was "probably the only one that Burnett will ever make. It's usually the case that the average ballplayers pop up with most of the freak records in the book." Stephen V. Rice of the Society for American Baseball Research later called it "one of the wildest and craziest games in baseball history". Baseball historian Norman Macht stated that the fans at League Park "wound up taking the wildest roller-coaster ride in baseball history. Their alternating currents of joy and despair would leave them exhausted—and late for Sunday supper."

== Aftermath ==
The Philadelphia victory, combined with the Yankees losing both games of a doubleheader to the St. Louis Browns, brought the Athletics to within six games of New York, but they would never again be so close that season. The next day, Cleveland and Philadelphia played two games at Shibe Park, and the Indians won both games, also taking the games against the Athletics on Tuesday and Wednesday to move into second place in the AL. In his Sunday newspaper column, Mack blamed the setback on the exhaustion of the team's pitching staff, called upon to pitch ninety innings in five days. On July 31, the teams met again in Cleveland for the opening of Cleveland Stadium before a crowd believed to be over 80,000 people (76,979 paid). Contrasting with the high scoring of the July 10 game, the Athletics beat the Indians 1–0, and beat them again by that score the following day. By this time the Athletics were back in second place, where they finished the season, thirteen games behind the Yankees. Cleveland finished fourth, nineteen games back.

On September 2, 1932, Krausse started for the Athletics and shut out the Red Sox, 15–0. He developed a sore arm and never pitched in the major leagues again, spending the next ten years in the low-level minor leagues. Ferrell, the losing pitcher on July 10, finished the season with a record of 23–13, the fourth straight year he had won twenty or more games. He finished his career in 1941 having achieved six such seasons and with a lifetime record of 193–128. For Burnett, 1932 was the final year in which he played 100 or more games, though he remained active until 1935, a year in which he hit .223 for the Browns, finishing his nine-year major league career with a lifetime batting average of .284. Foxx continued his challenge of Babe Ruth's record of 60 home runs in a season, but hampered by a wrist injury sustained in late July, fell two short.

Rommel's feat of pitching 17 innings reminded Murray Robinson of the 26-inning pitching marathon in 1920 between Joe Oeschger of the Boston Braves and Leon Cadore of the Brooklyn Dodgers, that ended in a 1–1 tie; he said neither pitcher was ever the same. He noted, though, that Rommel "has no future to consider". Rommel later stated that his arm was finished after the July 10 game. He had gained his 171st career victory against the Indians, but never won another game. He was released by the Athletics at season's end, and, when he could not find work as a player, was hired by Mack as a coach. After Rommel had a stint as a minor-league manager, Mack recommended that Rommel become an umpire; he spent the next 24 years umpiring, all but two of them in the major leagues.

Mack's financial distress led him, after the 1932 season, to begin to sell off his team's stars. He stated that if Sunday baseball had been legal in Philadelphia, he would not have had to do so. In 1933, the Pennsylvania General Assembly passed legislation allowing local voters to approve Sunday baseball, and Philadelphia's electorate did so that November. This came too late to preserve the team that had won three American League pennants, and Mack's Athletics posted poor records for the rest of the 1930s, as did the National League Philadelphia Phillies. The Athletics did not again win a pennant until 1972, by which time they were playing in Oakland, California. The Indians won their second pennant and World Series in 1948.

== Box score ==
July 10, 1932 3:00 pm (EDT) at League Park in Cleveland, Ohio
Team	1	2	3	4	5	6	7	8	9	10	11	12	13	14	15	16	17	18	R	H	E
Philadelphia Athletics	2	0	1	2	0	1	7	0	2	0	0	0	0	0	0	2	0	1	18	25	1
Cleveland Indians	3	0	3	0	1	1	6	0	1	0	0	0	0	0	0	2	0	0	17	33	5
Starting pitchers: PHL: Lew Krausse; CLE: Clint Brown; WP: Eddie Rommel (1–0) LP: Wes Ferrell (16–6); Home runs: PHL: Jimmie Foxx 3 (33); CLE: Earl Averill (4); Attendance: 10,000 (estimated); Umpires: George Hildebrand (HP), Brick Owens

Philadelphia	AB	R	H	RBI	BB	SO	AVG
Mule Haas, CF	9	3	2	0	1	1	.289
Doc Cramer, RF	8	2	2	1	2	2	.305
Jimmy Dykes, 3B	10	2	3	4	0	0	.266
Al Simmons, LF	9	4	5	2	1	1	.320
Jimmie Foxx, 1B	9	4	6	8	1	0	.383
Eric McNair, SS	10	0	2	1	0	0	.295
Johnnie Heving, C	4	0	0	0	0	0	.260
Ed Madjeski, C	5	0	0	0	0	2	.154
Dib Williams, 2B	8	1	2	0	1	1	.235
Lew Krausse, P	1	0	0	0	0	1	.100
Eddie Rommel, P	7	2	3	1	1	2	.364
Team totals	80	18	25	17	7	10	.312

Philadelphia	IP	H	R	ER	BB	SO	HR	ERA
Lew Krausse	1	4	3	3	1	0	1	6.75
Eddie Rommel (W, 1–0)	17	29	14	13	9	7	0	6.34
Team totals	18	33	17	16	10	7	1	8.00

Cleveland	AB	R	H	RBI	BB	SO	AVG
Dick Porter, RF	10	3	3	2	1	0	.317
Johnny Burnett, SS	11	4	9	2	0	1	.323
Earl Averill, CF	9	3	5	4	2	1	.333
Joe Vosmik, LF	10	2	2	1	0	0	.307
Ed Morgan, 1B	11	1	5	4	0	3	.300
Glenn Myatt, C	7	2	1	0	3	0	.275
Bill Cissell, 2B	9	1	4	3	1	0	.297
Willie Kamm, 3B	7	1	2	0	2	0	.263
Clint Brown, P	4	0	2	0	0	0	.273
Willis Hudlin, P	0	0	0	0	0	0	.185
Wes Ferrell, P	5	0	0	0	0	2	.227
Team totals	83	17	33	16	10	7	.398

Cleveland	IP	H	R	ER	BB	SO	HR	ERA
Clint Brown	6 2/3	13	8	7	1	3	1	4.17
Willis Hudlin	0	0	2	2	2	0	0	6.13
Wes Ferrell (L, 16–6)	11 1/3	12	8	6	4	7	2	3.45
Team totals	18	25	18	15	7	10	3	7.50

Hudlin pitched to two batters in the 7th inning.

Source for all box score statistics, except the names of the umpires, which was here.

== Sources ==
- Allen, Lee (1962). The American League Story. Hill & Wang. OCLC 1147859.
- Jordan, David M. (1999). The Athletics of Philadelphia: Connie Mack's White Elephants, 1901–1954. McFarland & Company, Inc. ISBN 978-0-7864-0620-3.
- Lowry, Philip J. (2010). Baseball's Longest Games: a Comprehensive Worldwide Record Book. McFarland & Company, Inc. ISBN 978-0-7864-4263-8.
- Macht, Norman (2008). "Marathon at League Park: Ed Rommel's 18–17 Game". In Sullivan, Brad (ed.). Batting Four Thousand: Baseball in the Western Reserve. Society for American Baseball Research. pp. 91–93. ISBN 978-1-933599-08-3.
- Macht, Norman L. (2015). The Grand Old Man of Baseball: Connie Mack in His Final Years, 1932–1956. University of Nebraska Press. ISBN 978-0-8032-3765-0.
- Odenkirk, James E. (2015). Of Tribes and Tribulations: The Early Decades of the Cleveland Indians. McFarland & Company, Inc. ISBN 978-1-4766-1706-0.
