= George Hildebrand =

American baseball player (1878-1960)

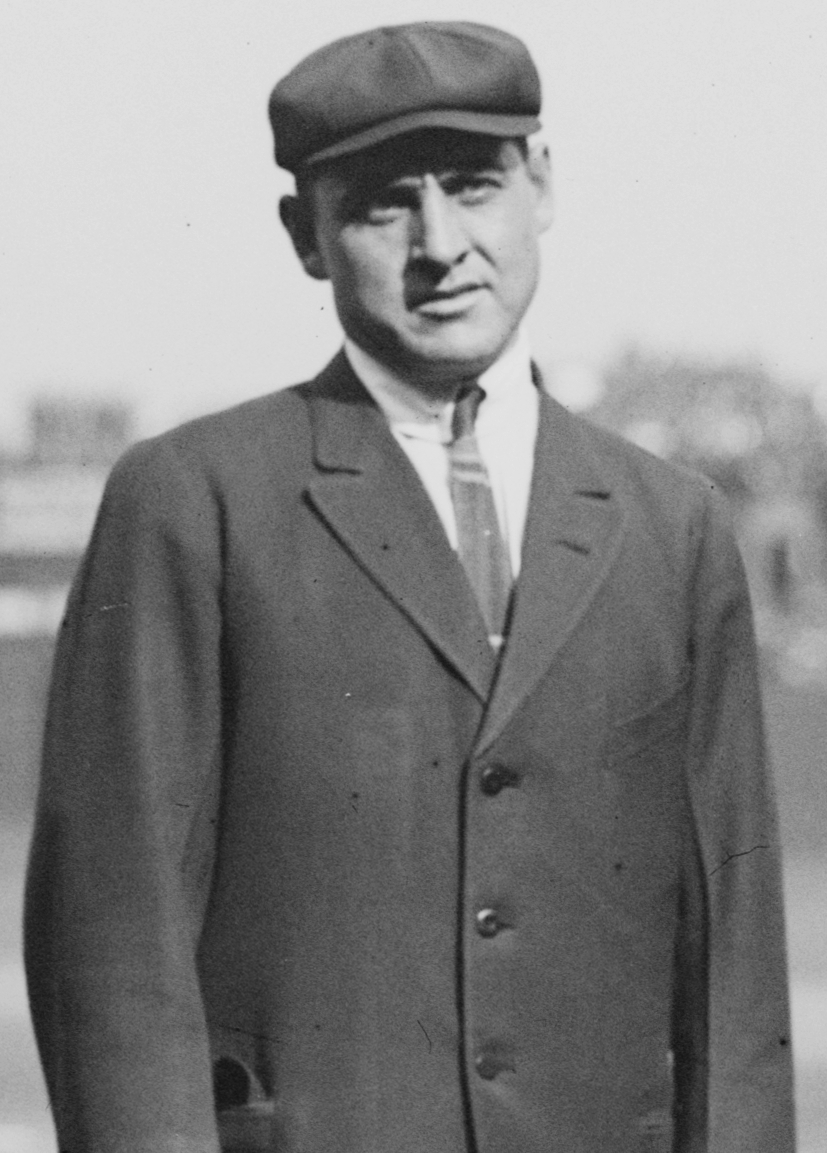
- Hildebrand as an umpire, 1915
- Left fielder
- Born: September 6, 1878; San Francisco, California, U.S.
- Died: May 30, 1960 (aged 81); Reseda, California, U.S.
- Batted: Right Threw: Right

MLB debut
- April 17, 1902, for the Brooklyn Superbas

Last MLB appearance
- April 28, 1902, for the Brooklyn Superbas

MLB statistics
- Batting average: .220
- Home runs: 0
- Runs batted in: 5
- Stats at Baseball Reference

Teams
- Brooklyn Superbas (1902)

George Albert Hildebrand (September 6, 1878 – May 30, 1960) was an American professional baseball player and umpire. He played in 11 Major League Baseball games as a left fielder for the 1902 Brooklyn Superbas before becoming an American League umpire from 1913 to 1934. He is often credited as having invented the spitball while playing in the minor leagues. He was the umpire in four World Series (1914, 1918, 1922, 1926), and his 3,331 games as an umpire ranked third in American League history at the time of his retirement.

== Baseball career ==
Born in San Francisco, California, Hildebrand began his playing career in 1898. He was playing for Providence in the Eastern League in the spring of 1902 when he discovered the effect moisture had on a pitched ball; he encouraged pitchers Frank Corridon and Elmer Stricklett to try the technique, and Stricklett was believed to be the first to use the pitch in a major league game in 1904.

Hildebrand worked much of his umpiring career in a team with Brick Owens. His most controversial decision came in Game 2 of the 1922 World Series, when he ended the game on account of darkness after 10 innings with the score tied 3–3, even though it did not begin to get dark until a half-hour later; it was widely believed that the game could have continued for a few more innings. It was later reported that third base umpire Bill Klem had expressed to Hildebrand his concern about a long game, recalling Game 2 of the 1914 Series, which had ended in almost complete darkness after 14 innings. There was such heavy criticism of Hildebrand's decision to end the game that commissioner Kenesaw Mountain Landis ordered the game proceeds ($120,000) to be donated to charity.

Hildebrand was behind the plate on June 21, 1916, when Rube Foster of the Boston Red Sox pitched a 2–0 no-hitter against the New York Yankees. He was also behind the plate on July 10, 1932 when Johnny Burnett of the Cleveland Indians collected a record nine hits in an 18-inning game against the Philadelphia Athletics.

== Later life ==
After retiring from baseball, Hildebrand moved into a house in Merced Manor with his wife. He later ran a hotel in Brawley, California, and then went into business in Los Angeles. He died of heart failure at age 81 at Reseda Hospital in Reseda, California, and was survived by his wife Sue and son Albert. He was buried in Valhalla Memorial Park Cemetery.
