= Newry City Ladies F.C. =

Football club in Northern Ireland

- Full name: Newry City Ladies Football Club
- Founded: 2011
- Ground: The Showgrounds, Newry
- League: Women's Premier League
- 2014-15: 1st
- Website: http://www.newrycityafc.co.uk/?cat=8

Newry City Ladies Football Club is a women's association football club based in Newry, County Armagh, Northern Ireland. They were founded in 2011 and re-founded in 2012. They are currently affiliated to Newry City A.F.C. men's team and play at The Showgrounds. Newry City Ladies are the only non-Belfast team to win the Women's Premiership since the year 2002, winning the title in 2015.

== History ==
=== Leagues ===
Newry City Ladies were founded in 2011 as part of Newry City F.C. and were entered into NIWFA division 4. They were promoted into Division 3 after a successful debut season and again were promoted into Division 2 after defeating PSNI in the Division 3 final. Despite this success, Newry City F.C. were wound up after a high court petition and the majority of its teams including Newry City Ladies were dissolved. However Newry City Ladies affiliated themselves with Newry City's phoenix club, Newry City A.F.C. This meant that were able to continue playing in the NIWFA Leagues but retained the original Newry City crest instead of adopting the one of Newry City A.F.C.

Newry City Ladies continued their rise through the NIWFA leagues, eventually being promoted to the Women's Premier League in 2014. In their debut season in the Women's Premier League, they won the title on the last day by defeating Mid-Ulster Ladies and finished ahead of Linfield Ladies. They also earned qualification to the UEFA Women's Champions League for the first time. They also became the first team since Lisburn Distillery Predators in 2001 to have won the title aside of Belfast affiliated Crusaders Newtownabbey Strikers and Glentoran Belfast United.

After the 2017 season they withdrew from the Premiership and went for the second level Championship instead.

=== Cups ===
Newry City Ladies have also competed in the IFA Women's Challenge Cup. In 2014 they reached the final. The time of the final was moved to a bank holiday Monday afternoon which Newry protested as a number of their squad were work-tied in the afternoon and requested a move to the evening. At Clandeboye Park, Linfield Ladies defeated Newry City Ladies on penalties.

== Honours ==
- Women's Premiership (Level 1)

Winners (1): 2015

- Women's Championship (Level 2)

Winners (1): 2014

- IFA Women's Challenge Cup

Runners-up (2): 2014, 2017
