= Eddie Rommel =

American baseball player (1897–1970)

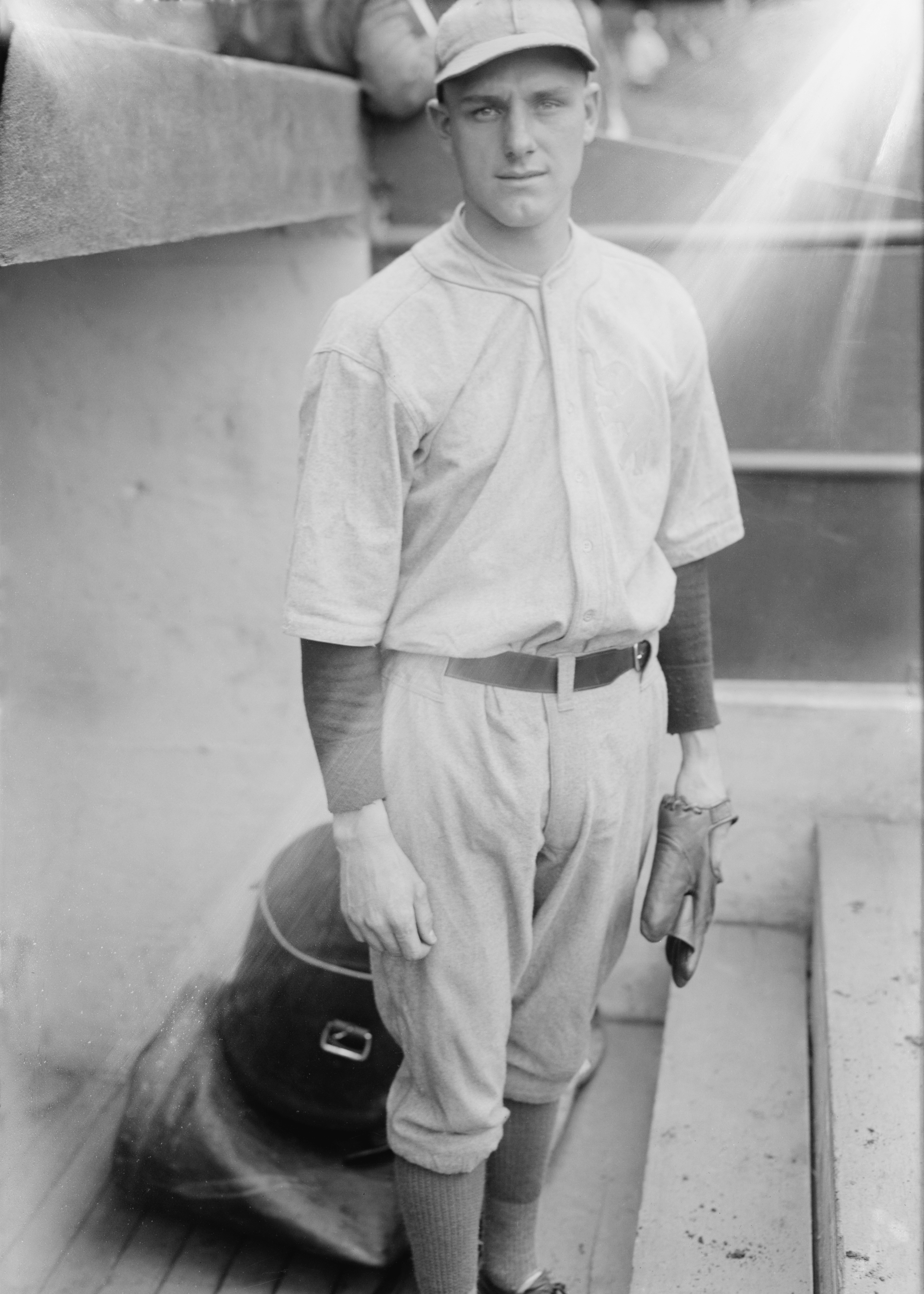
- Rommel in 1923
- Pitcher
- Born: September 13, 1897; Baltimore, Maryland, U.S.
- Died: August 26, 1970 (aged 72); Baltimore, Maryland, U.S.
- Batted: Right Threw: Right

MLB debut
- April 19, 1920, for the Philadelphia Athletics

Last MLB appearance
- September 17, 1932, for the Philadelphia Athletics

MLB statistics
- Win–loss record: 171–119
- Earned run average: 3.54
- Strikeouts: 599
- Stats at Baseball Reference

Teams
- Philadelphia Athletics (1920–1932)

Career highlights and awards
- 2× World Series champion (1929, 1930); 2× AL wins leader (1922, 1925); Philadelphia Baseball Wall of Fame

Edwin Americus Rommel (September 13, 1897 – August 26, 1970) was an American baseball player, coach, and umpire who played as a right-handed pitcher and in Major League Baseball. He spent his entire playing career (1920–1932) with the Philadelphia Athletics. He is considered to be one of the earlier adaptors of the modern knuckleball.

== Early life and career ==
Born in Baltimore, Maryland, Rommel pitched for the minor league Newark Bears in 1918 and 1919. He was picked up by Philadelphia after manager Connie Mack saw him start both ends of a doubleheader for Newark. Although he was knocked out by the third inning in both contests, Mack purchased his contract after noting that Rommel's curveball was breaking on the inside rather than the outside.

== Pitching career ==
In 1922, Rommel led the American League in wins with 27 despite playing for a team that finished seventh in the league and won only 65 games. Rommel won 20 games twice for the Athletics, in 1922 and 1925. Rommel made many relief appearances during his career, leading the AL in relief wins in three different seasons.

Rommel was reasonably handy with the bat for a pitcher, compiling a lifetime batting average of .199—though this was in an era where batting averages were generally higher than today. In 1931, he was called upon three times by Mack to play the outfield, where he made six putouts without an error, and once to play second base, where he was given no fielding chances.

Rommel surrendered ten home runs to Babe Ruth, tying him for tenth place. However, fellow Athletics pitchers Rube Walberg (17) and Howard Ehmke (13, but nine of them were with other teams) surrendered more, and Rommel gave up the same number of Ruth home runs as teammate George Earnshaw. Toward the end of his career, he relied mostly on the knuckleball.

=== Notable games ===
Rommel pitched in relief and earned the win in the epic Game 4 of the 1929 World Series; the Athletics overcame an 8–0 deficit by scoring ten runs against the Chicago Cubs in the seventh inning to win 10–8. Sent into the game with the Athletics down 7–0, he pitched one inning, gave up one run and was taken out for a pinch hitter. Rommel wound up the winning pitcher as the result of the "Mack Attack".

On an intense stretch of four home doubleheaders and a single road game in five days, Rommel pitched 17 innings in relief on July 10, 1932, against the Cleveland Indians and earned the win. Lew Krausse had been the starter; Mack only brought two pitchers to Cleveland for the one-game series. Rommel relieved Krausse after one inning and finished the game, which was a 15–15 deadlock after nine innings and ended 18–17 in favor of the Athletics in 18 innings (and in which Jimmie Foxx hit three home runs), despite the Indians setting what remains a league record with 33 hits. The game might have been shorter, but Rommel lost the lead in the seventh, ninth and 16th innings. The 29 hits allowed by Rommel remain a major league record, as do Cleveland's Johnny Burnett's nine hits. Rommel allowed 39 baserunners, also a record (since 1901). It was Rommel's final major league victory. Rommel was given his unconditional release by the Athletics at the end of the 1932 season.

== Coaching and umpiring career ==
After retiring as a player, Rommel became an Athletics coach in 1933 and 1934, and then managed the Richmond Colts of the Piedmont League in 1935, capturing the league championship in his only season before leaving in a salary dispute. He also pitched eight games for Richmond, posting a 6–2 mark.

Rommel turned to umpiring in the New York–Penn League in 1936 and the International League in 1937, moving up to the American League in 1938, and remained on the league staff through the 1959 season. Despite his background as a pitcher, Rommel did not tolerate throwing at batters, decrying it as dishonest and not to fans' liking. He noted that he only threw at a batter once during his own career, on the insistence of catcher Cy Perkins, and that the runner (Ray Schalk) eventually scored and cost him the game.

Rommel worked in the World Series in 1943 and 1947, serving as crew chief the first time, and becoming the third man to appear in the Series both as a player and as an umpire. He also umpired in the All-Star Game six times: 1939, 1943, 1946, 1950, 1954 and 1958; he called balls and strikes in the 1943, '54 and '58 contests. Rommel was the second base umpire for the one-game playoff to decide the 1948 AL pennant. He was the first umpire in Major League history to wear glasses in a regular season game.

== Later life ==
Rommel became an aide to Maryland governor J. Millard Tawes in August 1960.

He died in Baltimore in August 1970, after a lengthy illness, at age 72.

== See also ==
- List of Major League Baseball annual wins leaders
- List of Major League Baseball umpires (disambiguation)
- List of Major League Baseball players who spent their entire career with one franchise
