= Tuffey =

Tuffey is a surname. Notable people with the surname include:

- Daryl Tuffey (born 1978), New Zealand cricketer
- Jonathan Tuffey (born 1987), Northern Irish footballer
