= Fermanagh Mallards F.C. =

Women's Football club

- Full name: Fermanagh Mallards Football Club
- Founded: 2005
- Ground: Ferney Park, Ballinamallard
- League: None (formally Women's Premier League)

Fermanagh Mallards Football Club is a women's association football club based in Ballinamallard, County Fermanagh, Northern Ireland. They play their home matches at Ballinamallard United F.C.'s Ferney Park. The club was founded in 2005 and is the only women's football team in County Fermanagh. They are not currently affiliated with any league after being ejected from the Women's Premier League in June 2013.

== History ==
Fermanagh Mallards were initially placed in the Women's Premier League in their first season in 2005-2006, where they finished sixth. In 2007 the team retained its previous season's ranking. In 2008 they finished at the bottom of the league without gaining a point.

In 2009 Fermanagh Mallards won the Championship Cup against Cliftonville. In 2010 the team was promoted back into the Women's Premier League from the Women's Championship after beating Loughgall Lakers into second place. The club has also provided players for the Northern Ireland women's national football team.

In June 2013 Fermanagh Mallards were ejected from the Women's Premier League by the Northern Ireland Women's Football Association because of a lack of players, which often led to numerous fines and loss of points during the 2013 season. The ejection came after the club did not travel to Belfast for a league cup match against Glentoran Belfast United L.F.C., the third time that the team forfeited a fixture during the season. As a result, Fermanagh Mallards were also banned from competing in the Women's Premier League during the 2014 season.

== Youth ==
Following their Championship Cup success in 2010, the Fermanagh Mallards started a junior team after a consultation evening at Ferney Park. In 2013, their under-17 team won the Northern Ireland Women's Football Association Under 17 League.
