= Nadene Caldwell =

Northern Irish footballer

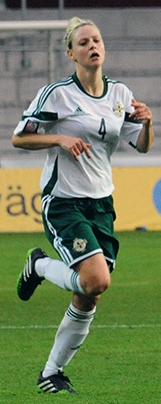
- Caldwell in 2014

Personal information
- Date of birth: 24 January 1991 (age 35)
- Place of birth: Belfast, Northern Ireland
- Height: 1.65 m (5 ft 5 in)
- Position: Midfielder

Team information
- Current team: Glentoran
- Number: 6

Senior career*
Years	Team	Apps	(Gls)
	Glentoran	0	(0)

International career^{‡}
2007	Northern Ireland U17	3	(0)
200?–200?	Northern Ireland U19	7	(0)
2009–	Northern Ireland	67	(2)
	Northern Ireland (futsal)	3	(1)
- * Club domestic league appearances and goals ‡ National team caps and goals as of 23:00, 13 July 2022 (UTC)

Nadene Caldwell (born 24 January 1991) is a Northern Irish futsal player and an association footballer who plays as a midfielder for Women's Premiership club Glentoran and the Northern Ireland women's national team.

== International career ==
Caldwell was part of the squad that was called up to the UEFA Women's Euro 2022.

== International goals ==
No.	Date	Venue	Opponent	Score	Result	Competition
1.	13 March 2021	Seaview, Belfast, Northern Ireland	Ukraine	2–0	2–0	UEFA Women's Euro 2022 qualifying play-offs
