= Francis Xavier McQuade =

American judge

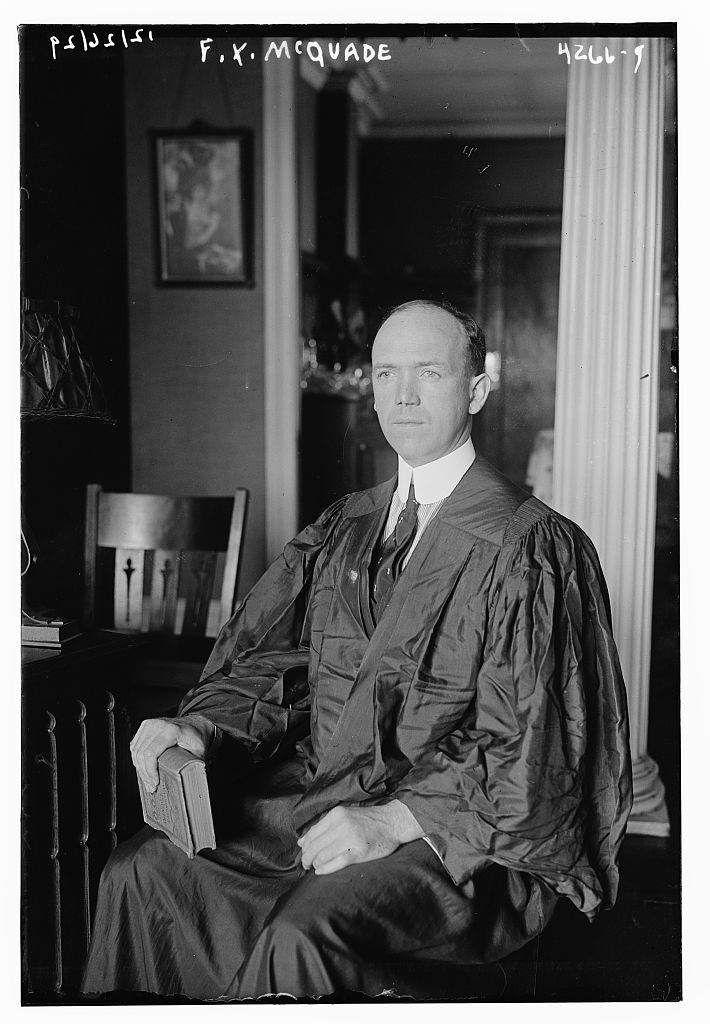
- Born: August 11, 1878; Staten Island, New York
- Died: April 6, 1955 (aged 76); Manhattan, New York City
- Other names: Francis X. McQuade; F. X. McQuade
- Known for: Sunday baseball games
- Spouse: Lucille M. Khrone
- Parent(s): Arthur J. McQuade; Ellen E. Tuite

Francis Xavier McQuade (August 11, 1878 – April 6, 1955) was a New York City judge. In 1917 he advocated for allowing Sunday baseball games in New York in defiance of existing New York state blue laws. In 1919 he became one of the owners of the New York Giants with Charles Abraham Stoneham.

== Biography ==
He was born on Staten Island, New York, on August 11, 1878, to Arthur J. McQuade and Ellen E. Tuite.

In 1917 the New York Giants and Cincinnati Reds played their first Sunday game at the Polo Grounds in Manhattan. After the game both managers, John McGraw and Christy Mathewson, were arrested for violating New York state blue laws. McQuade presided over the case and found them not guilty and wrote: "In my opinion there was no infraction of any statute." In 1919 he became part-owner of the New York Giants when Charles Stoneham bought the team. As part of the deal, Stoneham took on McQuade and longtime manager John McGraw as partners, with McQuade becoming treasurer. According to some sources, McQuade was responsible for introducing McGraw to Stoneham after McGraw got wind that the heirs of late owner John T. Brush wanted out of baseball.

McQuade was abruptly fired in 1928, ostensibly to resolve strife between the business and baseball sides of the Giants franchise. In 1930, McQuade sued Stoneham, seeking reinstatement to his post and damages for an ouster he claimed was unlawful. A court awarded McQuade $43,000 in damages. While the court refused to reinstate him as club treasurer, it cleared the way for McQuade to take the Giants back to court if he wasn't reinstated voluntarily. However, the New York Court of Appeals overturned the judgment, pointing out that McQuade could not legally serve as treasurer due to a state law forbidding municipal judges from holding any other paying job.

He died on April 6, 1955, in Manhattan, New York City, at the age of 78.
