= Crusaders Strikers F.C. =

Crusaders Strikers
- Nickname: Strikers / The Crues
- Founded: 1992
- Ground: Seaview, Belfast
- Capacity: 3,383
- Chairman: Stephen Calvert
- Manager: Jonny Tuffey
- League: Women's Premiership
- 2025: 5th
- Website: http://www.crusadersfc.com
Home colours	Away colours

Crusaders Strikers Football Club is a women's association football club based in North Belfast, Northern Ireland. The club was founded in 1992 as Newtownabbey Strikers and became a member of the Northern Ireland Women's Football Association in 1994. In 2009, Newtownabbey Strikers amalgamated with Crusaders F.C. to become Crusaders Strikers.

The team has won the Women's Premier League of Northern Ireland six times.

== First-team squad ==
As of 4 February 2024

Note: Flags indicate national team as defined under FIFA eligibility rules; some limited exceptions apply. Players may hold more than one non-FIFA nationality.

No.	Pos.	Nation	Player
3	DF	NIR	Caitlyn Hamilton
4	MF	NIR	Amy McGivern
6	MF	NIR	Heather Mearns
9	FW	NIR	Faith Johnston
10	FW	NIR	Mairead McCann
11	MF	NIR	Leah McEvoy
12	DF	NIR	Aimee McNeill
13	FW	NIR	Morganne Beggs
15	DF	NIR	Julie Nelson (captain)
17	DF	NIR	Abby Redmond
18	DF	NIR	Lisa Armour

No.	Pos.	Nation	Player
23	FW	USA	Meghan Ingram
25	MF	NIR	Kerry Eddis
26	FW	NIR	Lucy Kirgan
33	DF	NIR	Beth Chalmers
35	MF	NIR	Zoe Rodgers
44	GK	NIR	Maddy Harvey-Clifford
46	FW	NIR	Emily Wilson
70	DF	NIR	Rachel McLaren
76	FW	NIR	Darcey Boyle
88	MF	NIR	Jessica Rea

== European record ==
In UEFA competitions the strikers have achieved two draws so far against FC Clujana Cluj and Maccabi Holon. The club played in the 2010–11 UEFA Women's Champions League qualifying round hosting the mini-tournament but lost all their games.

UEFA Women's Cup:

- 2003–04: 2nd qualifying round, 4th
- 2004–05: 2nd qualifying round, 4th
- 2006–07: 1st qualifying round, 4th

UEFA Women's Champions League:

- 2010–11: qualifying round, 4th
- 2011–12: qualifying round, 4th
- 2013–14: qualifying round, 4th

== Northern Ireland Internationals ==
Northern Ireland internationals

- Julie Nelson

Northern Ireland U19 internationals

- Beth Chalmers
- Faith Johnston
- Maddy Harvey-Clifford
- Jessica Rea
- Sasha Clare
- Holly Otter
- Rachel McLaren

== Titles ==
- Women's Premiership

Winners (6): 2002, 2003, 2005, 2009, 2010, 2012

- IFA Women's Challenge Cup

Winners (2): 2005, 2011

== Crusaders Strikers Football Development Centre/Girls Academy ==
Crusaders Strikers have the most established girls' Football Development Centre in Northern Ireland where they cater for girls aged 4–18.

The FDC aims to bring girls through the pathway to senior football, while also promoting lifetime participation.

The FDC has had a lot of success over the years, with a lot of the current first team being made up of academy graduates.

The FDC/academy philosophy is 'to develop good players and good people.'
