= Sunday sporting events =

Cultural practice of holding or avoiding sporting events on Sunday

Sunday sporting events were not usually played until the early 20th century. In North America, they were prohibited due to blue laws at first, but then cities like Chicago, St. Louis, and Cincinnati later decided to legalize them. Other cities such as New York City and Philadelphia had intense political and court battles to legalize the games. Nowadays, professional sports leagues schedule games on Sundays in the United States, though this practice continues to be opposed by some Christian denominations upholding first-day Sabbatarian doctrine.

== Origins ==
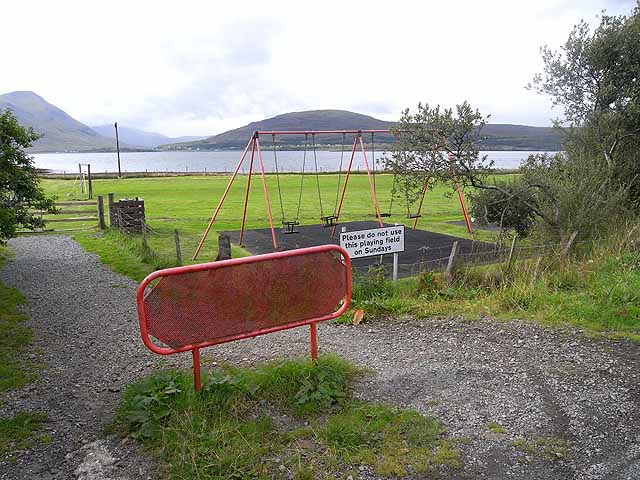
A recreation ground in Raasay, Scotland displaying a sign that reads "Please do not use this playing field on Sundays", reflecting a commitment to first-day Sabbatarian Christian doctrine.

Because of Christian religious orthodoxy, it was considered offensive to work on Sunday, which was expected to be a day of worship and rest from servile labor. Many governments instituted blue laws to limit activities that could be pursued on a Sunday, including such recreational pursuits as sports and games. In 1794, the Pennsylvania Assembly restricted activities on Sunday by passing what they called "an Act for the prevention of vice and immorality, and of unlawful gaming, and to restrain disorderly sports and dissipation".

== By sport ==
=== Association football ===
In England, association football was historically banned on Sunday. However, in 1974, The Football Association appealed to the Home Office to allow Sunday football to counter the ban on using floodlights due to the three day week which was granted. Due to the Sunday Observance Act, clubs were banned from charging admission but they exploited a loophole in the law and stipulated that, while admission would be free, the purchase of a programme (equivalent to the usual price of a ticket) would be required to enter. In Northern Ireland, the Irish Football Association retained a total ban on Sunday football until 2008 when the rules were relaxed to allow them only if both teams agreed and that no player could be punished for refusing to play on Sunday. Further relaxations allowed for Sunday matches if Northern Irish clubs had European matches during the week and to avoid matches clashing with major national events.

=== American Football ===
Lobbying efforts by baseball team owner Connie Mack influenced Pennsylvania governor Gifford Pinchot to modify the state's blue law on 25 April 1933 "so that local jurisdictions could choose whether to allow baseball or football games to be played on Sunday."

In Pittsburgh, Steelers football team founder Art Rooney faced opposition as the city's blue laws prevented him from holding football games on Sundays. Realizing that a large number of the city's residents who supported blue laws were planning to protest the upcoming Pittsburgh Pirates vs. New York Giants game, Rooney "hurried down to city hall to get some answers", where the Director of Public Safety, Harmar Denny, informed him that only two people held the authority to stop the sporting event from happening, one being himself and the other being Franklin McQuaide, the superintendent of police. Denny said that he would be out of town on that Sunday. As such, Rooney stopped at McQuaide's office and invited him to sit at the 50-yard line, an offer that McQuaide accepted, which resulted in the football game not being shut down.

=== Baseball ===
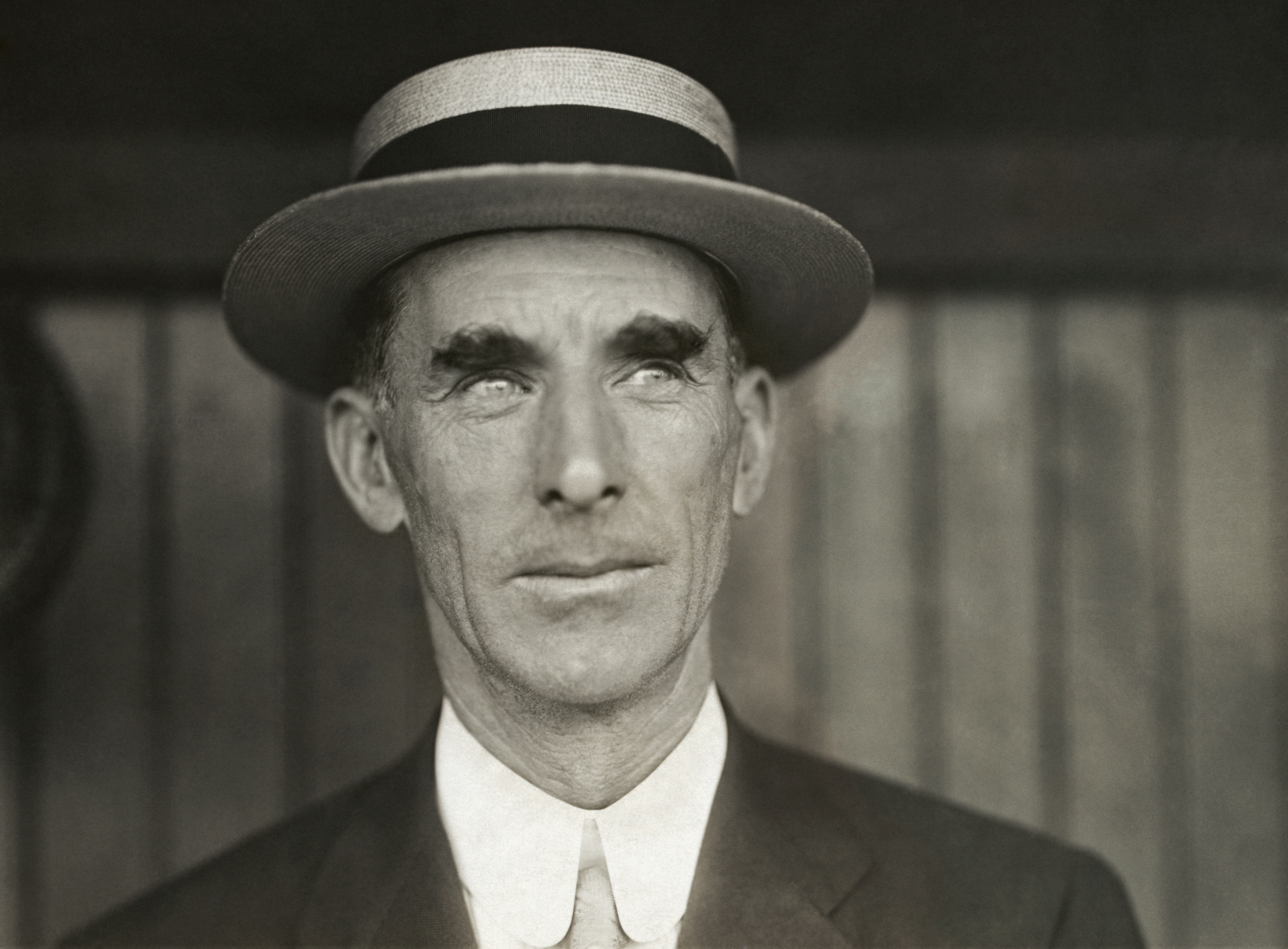
Connie Mack, manager of the Philadelphia Athletics

In 1902, Sunday baseball games were legalized in Chicago, St. Louis, and Cincinnati.

In 1907, New York City Democrats introduced two bills in Albany, New York that attempted to legalize Sunday baseball. State Assemblyman Al Smith spoke out against the ban of Sunday baseball, arguing that it was better for young men to be playing baseball than to "be driven to places where they play Waltz Me Around Again, Willie." However, both bills were unsuccessful.

In 1911, Philadelphia Athletics manager Connie Mack expressed a desire for the Athletics to play on Sunday. The main driving force behind his interest in playing on Sunday was to earn money. The Athletics were not a wealthy baseball club, and Athletics vice-president John Shibe estimated that the team would make $20,000 for each Sunday game that they played in Philadelphia. Mack thought that, for the team, it was financially necessary to play on Sundays, explaining that "we [the Athletics] cannot meet our payrolls playing on seventy-seven weekdays at home". Many Pennsylvania politicians and religious groups opposed Shibe and Mack's effort for Sunday baseball, claiming that playing on that day was a "breach of peace" and that the games would be "a disturbance to persons in that neighborhood desirous of preserving the peace and quiet of Sunday so that they may in such peace and quiet pursue their religious worship and meditation". Unfortunately for the Athletics, Philadelphia's other baseball team, the Phillies, took no public position on the subject, undermining the Athletics' case.

In 1917, the New York Giants and Cincinnati Reds played the first Sunday game ever at the Polo Grounds, New York's home field. It was a benefit game, held during the First World War, to assist dependents of a military regiment. However, after the game both managers, John McGraw and Christy Mathewson, were arrested for violating the blue laws. Judge Francis Xavier McQuade found them not guilty and commended them for their patriotic motives.

The following year, Sunday baseball was legalized in Cleveland, Washington, D.C., and Detroit. One year after that, New York legalized baseball games on Sunday, and baseball teams that played in New York (the New York Giants, the New York Yankees, and the Brooklyn Dodgers) were allowed to have home games on Sunday.

==== The Athletics fight for Sunday baseball ====
In 1926, the Philadelphia Athletics were selected to host the Sesquicentennial Exposition to celebrate the 150th Anniversary of American Independence. The Exposition was running a deficit, so the board of directors voted to open on Sundays and charge an admission fee. A few days later, the Athletics announced that they would play a game on August 22, 1926 against the Chicago White Sox. Officials for the Athletics felt that there was no difference between charging people admission for Exposition amusements on Sunday, and charging a fee for a baseball game. Philadelphia mayor W. Freeland Kendrick objected to the Athletics' decision and announced that he would use police to keep Shibe Park closed. The Athletics went to court to request that Kendrick's decision be overturned. Judge Frank Smith granted the A's request and ruled on Saturday, August 21, 1926 that those seeking to prohibit Sunday baseball could only do so if "their right to quiet and undisturbed religious worship is encroached upon as a result of the game". Smith's ruling also declared that to prove the game had created "a breach of peace", the game first had to be played, so the earliest legal action that could take place would be on the following Monday.

Approximately 12,000 spectators attended the game, where the Athletics defeated the White Sox 3–2. During the game, Rev. William B. Forney drove around the park multiple times, and said that he was "ashamed that such an exhibition could be held on the Sabbath", and called the cheers from the crowd a "disgusting noise". Athletics manager Connie Mack was glad that baseball was played on Sunday, and was quoted as saying "I am glad that we won, of course, but I am more than glad that nothing happened that could be construed as a breach of the peace… I wish all those who oppose Sunday baseball could have been here today. They would see that we are not causing a lessening in church attendance."

Mayor Kendrick said that although the crowd for Sunday's game was "unusually subdued", he thought that any Sunday game was a breach of peace and the law. He also announced that the city of Philadelphia would seek a higher court to overturn Judge Smith's ruling. Connie Mack quickly announced that scheduling difficulties would prevent any more Sunday games in 1926. Even owner John Shibe told fans that "we are not going out of our way to play Sunday games... As there are no open Sundays left we shall probably leave things as they are until next season."

The City of Philadelphia took the case to Dauphin County Court, where the court decided the baseball being played on Sunday was unlawful "worldly employment". The Athletics then announced that they would take their case to the Pennsylvania Supreme Court, who ruled in September 1927, by a vote of 7 to 2, the Sunday Baseball was both "unholy" and "worldly employment". The Pennsylvania Supreme Court also threatened the Athletics, saying that if the A's continued to play on Sunday, their club corporation franchise would be revoked. After this ruling, Athletics attorney announced that although the Athletics were going to drop their appeal, they did not plan on giving up.

In 1931, a bill to liberalize the Blue Sunday Laws was introduced by supporters in the Pennsylvania State Legislature. The bill was passed by the house 106-98, but was soundly defeated by the State Senate. This caused A's attorney Gartling to announce plans to build a 50,000 seat stadium in Camden, New Jersey and move the team if Sunday restrictions were not eliminated. A public outcry ensued, which caused owner Shibe to quickly say that the plan was only visionary.

In 1933, the House and Senate of Pennsylvania finally passed a bill that allowed local jurisdictions to vote on whether Sunday sports would be legalized in their area. When Philadelphia voted on the proposal, they easily won the right to play sports on Sunday. However, the A's had already sold many of their star players (including Al Simmons, Mickey Cochrane, and Lefty Grove) to pay for team finances, and in 1954 the A's moved to Kansas City, Missouri. The bill also didn't help the Philadelphia Phillies, who were struggling financially, until the team was bought by owner R. R. M. Carpenter, Jr., who was able to fix the Phillies' financial situation.

==== Present-day practice ====
Once the last of the blue laws preventing Sunday baseball were gone, most teams scheduled Sunday games regularly. In the 1950s and 1960s, most teams frequently scheduled doubleheaders on Sunday to maximize attendance. Although rising attendance has led to the elimination of regularly scheduled doubleheaders (with rare exceptions), Major League Baseball still schedules a full slate of games for each Sunday during the season, including Sunday night games televised by ESPN. Minor leagues play regularly on Sunday as well.

== Opposition to Sunday sports ==
Churches teaching the doctrine of first-day Sabbatarianism (Sunday Sabbatarianism), such as the Presbyterian Churches and Methodist Churches, traditionally believe that the Lord's Day should be dedicated to worship (through attendance at church services and family prayer), works of mercy (such as visiting the sick), as well as rest from servile labour. They believe that viewing and participating in sporting events held on Sundays are in violation of the Ten Commandments dictum to "Remember the sabbath day, to keep it holy". As such, many Christian sports leagues do not hold games on Sundays.

Certain Christian denominations oppose professional sports as a whole, believing that the industry is guilty of Sabbath desecration because many participating leagues hold sporting events on the Lord's Day.

== See also ==
- Bob Davenport
- Donn Moomaw
- Eric Liddell
- Sunday football in Northern Ireland
