= Lisburn Rangers Ladies F.C. =

Women's association football club in Northern Ireland

- Full name: Lisburn Rangers Ladies FC
- Founded
- Ground: Crewe Park, Lisburn
- Manager: Hugh Sinclair
- League: Women's Premiership
- 2025: 4th
Home colours

Lisburn Rangers Ladies FC is a women's association football club based in Lisburn, Northern Ireland. After winning the Northern Ireland women's championship in 2023, Lisburn Rangers Ladies FC will join the top flight of their country for the first time in the 2024 Women's Premiership (Northern Ireland). The club will join another Lisburn club, Lisburn Ladies FC.

The surprise team of the season, the club climbed to the top of the competition from the very first matches, ultimately finishing in fourth place. After four match days, the team remains undefeated. The Rangers even triumphed on the pitch of some of the competition's star teams, such as Linfield Ladies.

During their first season in the top flight, Lisburn Rangers reached the final of the IFA Women's Challenge Cup. They lost the match heavily against Cliftonville Ladies by a score of 5-0.

In 2025, Lisburn Rangers participated in the Women's All-Island Cup

== Honours ==
- IFA Women's Challenge Cup

(Runner-up): 2024

- Women's County Antrim Cup

Winners: 2025
