= Jonathan Tuffey =

Northern Irish footballer

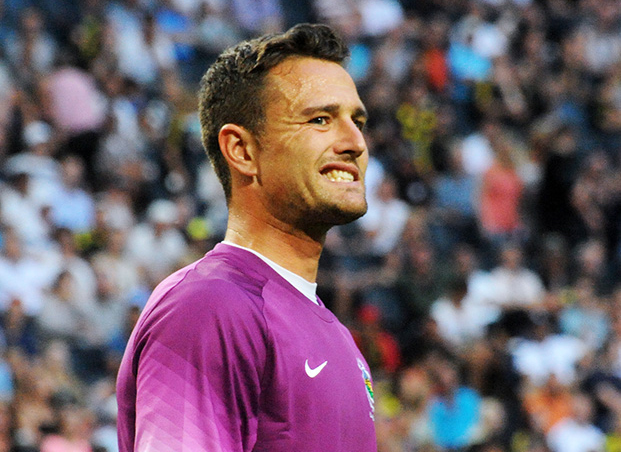

Personal information
- Full name: Jonathan Tuffey
- Date of birth: 20 January 1987 (age 39)
- Place of birth: Banbridge, Northern Ireland
- Height: 6 ft 0 in (1.83 m)
- Position: Goalkeeper

Team information
- Current team: Crusaders
- Number: 33

Senior career*
Years	Team	Apps	(Gls)
2003–2006	Coventry City	0	(0)
2006–2010	Partick Thistle	110	(0)
2010–2012	Inverness Caledonian Thistle	8	(0)
2012–2013	St Johnstone	0	(0)
2013–2015	Linfield	64	(0)
2015–2021	Glenavon	195	(0)
2021–2026	Crusaders	184	(0)

International career^{‡}
2003–2004	Northern Ireland U17	8	(0)
2004–2005	Northern Ireland U19	11	(0)
2006–2008	Northern Ireland U21	13	(0)
2008–2011	Northern Ireland	8	(0)

Managerial career
- 2021–: Crusaders Strikers
- * Club domestic league appearances and goals as of 26 April 2026 ‡ National team caps and goals as of 17 November 2011

Jonathan Tuffey (born 20 January 1987 in Banbridge, Northern Ireland) is a Northern Irish footballer and manager who plays as a goalkeeper for NIFL Premiership side Crusaders and is manager of Women's Premiership side Crusaders Strikers. He has also appeared for the Northern Ireland national football team.

Tuffey started his career at Championship side Coventry City, however he failed to make a breakthrough into the first team. He then joined the then Scottish First Division team Partick Thistle in 2006, replacing the legendary Kenny Arthur. Following a successful four years at Firhill, Tuffey signed for Scottish Premier League side Inverness Caledonian Thistle and then St Johnstone. Tuffey then returned to Northern Ireland to sign for Linfield, where he played for two years before transferring to Glenavon. On 31 January 2021, it was confirmed that Tuffey had signed on transfer deadline day for Crusaders.

== Club career ==
Tuffey started his career in 2003 at English club Coventry City, brought to the club by scout Willie McKeown. He progressed his way through the academy system with the Sky Blues but failed to make a first-team appearance. Tuffey was third choice at Coventry but was a near ever-present for the reserves.

Tuffey signed for Scottish club Partick Thistle in May 2006. He made his debut for Partick Thistle in September 2006 in a 2–1 win against Hamilton Academical. In the very next game he conceded six goals in a 6–0 defeat to Gretna. He would go on to make 14 more appearances and keeping four clean sheets.

By the 2007–08 season, and with Thistle under new management, Tuffey had become Thistle's first-choice goalkeeper. In March 2008 he won the First Division player of the month award, in a month in which Thistle were unbeaten, including a 1–1 draw away to Rangers. He finished the 2007–08 season with 34 appearances. During the 2008–09 season Tuffey started all 36 league games for Partick Thistle and kept 14 clean sheets. He finished the 2009–10 season with 38 appearances.

Tuffey turned down a new contract with Partick, signing with Inverness prior to the 2010–11 season. He struggled to become 1st choice during his time at Thistle. He left Inverness at the end of the 2011–12 season. His last game for the club was in a 2–0 win over Hibs, although he was an unused substitute. He signed for St Johnstone shortly after leaving Inverness.

Having made only one appearance for St Johnstone, he was released in June 2013 and subsequently signed for Northern Irish side Linfield.

Upon his release by Linfield, Tuffey joined fellow NIFL Premiership side Glenavon on a two-year deal. Tuffey made his official debut for the side in a Europa League qualifier in which Glenavon lost 3–0 away to FC Shakhtyor Soligorsk and lost subsequently 5–1 on aggregate. Tuffey has since replaced James McGrath as Glenavon's first choice goalkeeper and won the Glenavon player of the month award for August 2015. On 23 January 2021, Glenavon Manager Gary Hamilton told the club's website that Tuffey had turned down the offer of a new contract, stating, "He's looking for something else in his career, he's looking for a new challenge."

On 31 January 2021, on transfer deadline day, Tuffey signed for Crusaders on a three-and-a-half-year contract. On 7 May 2022 in the 2022 Irish Cup final, Tuffey assisted a last-minute equaliser for Josh Robinson to force extra-time, in which Crusaders scored a last-minute winner to win the trophy.

== International career ==
=== Under-21s ===
Tuffey received 13 caps and during 2007 and 2008 he featured as the captain of the Northern Ireland under-21 team on several occasions. On 1 June 2007, Northern Ireland earned a 1–0 in their opening European Championship qualifier in Moldova. He produced three saves before half-time to keep his team ahead.

=== Northern Ireland ===
Tuffey gained his first full cap on 19 November 2008 in a 2–0 defeat to Hungary. In gaining his first full international cap, Tuffey became the 28th player to be capped for his country while playing for Partick Thistle and became the sixth Partick Thistle player to be capped by a country other than Scotland, and the first since Adrian Madaschi who played four times for Australia in the summer of 2004. After the game, he said "It was fantastic, it was something that I have dreamed about since I was a boy. It's been a long journey to get here but now that the cap has come I'm over the moon."

He gained his second full cap and first start on 6 June 2009 in the 3–0 defeat to Italy. He produced a number of saves including a Giampaolo Pazzini penalty.

His third cap came in the 1–1 friendly draw against Israel. Tuffey came on at half time replacing Maik Taylor and keeping a clean sheet in the second half, which included a block with his left leg in the 80th minute from a Roberto Collauti turn and shot.

Tuffey started for Northern Ireland in an international friendly against Morocco on 17 November 2010 in which he kept a clean sheet in the first half before being replaced at half time. He then played in the 2011 Nations Cup match against Scotland on 9 February 2011, a 3–0 defeat for Northern Ireland.

== Coaching career ==
Tuffey has been manager of Women's Premiership side Crusaders Strikers since August 2021, having previously served as goalkeeping coach.

== Career statistics ==
As of match played on 7 May 2022.

Appearances and goals by club, season and competition
Club	Season	League		Cup		League Cup		Continental		Other		Total	
Club	Season	Apps	Goals	Apps	Goals	Apps	Goals	Apps	Goals	Apps	Goals	Apps	Goals
Partick Thistle	2006–07	15	0	1	0	0	0	—		—		16	0
Partick Thistle	2007–08	26	0	5	0	3	0	—		—		34	0
Partick Thistle	2008–09	36	0	2	0	3	0	—		—		41	0
Partick Thistle	2009–10	33	0	1	0	4	0	—		2 (Note: Appearances in the Scottish Challenge Cup.)	0	40	0
Partick Thistle	Total	110	0	9	0	10	0	—		2	0	131	0
Inverness Caledonian Thistle	2010–11	3	0	2	0	2	0	—		—		7	0
Inverness Caledonian Thistle	2011–12	4	0	3	0	1	0	—		—		8	0
Inverness Caledonian Thistle	Total	7	0	5	0	3	0	—		—		15	0
St Johnstone	2012–13	0	0	0	0	1	0	0	0	—		1	0
Linfield	2013–14	38	0	1	0	2	0	4 (Note: Appearances in the UEFA Europa League.)	0	—		45	0
Linfield	2014–15	21	0	0	0	0	0	4	0	—		25	0
Linfield	Total	59	0	1	0	2	0	8	0	—		70	0
Glenavon	2015–16	37	0	4	0	0	0	1	0	—		42	0
Glenavon	2016–17	38	0	3	0	0	0	2	0	1 (Note: Appearances in the NIFL Charity Shield.)	0	44	0
Glenavon	2017–18	38	0	2	0	0	0	1	0	—		41	0
Glenavon	2018–19	38	0	1	0	0	0	1	0	—		40	0
Glenavon	2019–20	27	0	0	0	0	0	0	0	2	0	29	0
Glenavon	2020–21	7	0	0	0	0	0	0	0	0	0	7	0
Glenavon	Total	185	0	10	0	0	0	5	0	3	0	213	0
Crusaders	2020–21	14	0	3	0	—		—		0	0	17	0
Crusaders	2021–22	35	0	5	0	1	0	—		1 (Note: Appearances in the County Antrim Shield.)	0	42	0
Crusaders	Total	49	0	8	0	1	0	0	0	1	0	59	0
Career total		410	0	33	0	17	0	13	0	6	0	479	0

== Honours ==
Glenavon

- Irish Cup: 2015–16

Crusaders

- Irish Cup: 2021–22, 2022–23
- NIFL Charity Shield: 2022

Individual

- Scottish First Division Player of the Month: March 2008
