= Olivia Canavan =

Northern Irish footballer (born 2006)

Personal information
- Full name: Olivia Clara Canavan
- Date of birth: 1 September 2006 (age 20)
- Place of birth: County Donegal, Republic of Ireland
- Height: 1.78 m (5 ft 10 in)
- Positions: Right-back; centre-back

Team information
- Current team: Larne
- Number: 28

International career
Years	Team	Apps	(Gls)
2021–	Northern Ireland U17	3	(0)

Olivia Clara Canavan (born 1 September 2006) is a Northern Irish professional footballer who plays as a right-back and centre-back for Larne and the Northern Ireland national under-17 football team.

== Early life ==
Canavan was born on 1 September 2006 in County Donegal, Republic of Ireland. She started playing football at the inspiration of her brother. Her favourite players are Linfield defender Ashley Hutton and England international defender Lucy Bronze. Though she has been diagnosed with congenital stationary night blindness, she has learned to “identify her teammates by focusing on colour, shapes, movement, and voice recognition.” For her outstanding achievement, she has been awarded the Mary Peters Trust. Olivia's main inspiration in sport is her aunt Kelly Gallagher. who won Great Britain's first Winter Paralympic gold medal in Sochi 2014.

== Club career ==
When she was 15, Canavan joined Bangor FC, with whom she spent two seasons, during which she also played with boys. She joined Glentoran in 2022. In 2024, the young defender signed for Larne and made her first appearance in the NIFL Women’s Premiership.

== International career ==
Canavan has been called up to the Northern Ireland under-17 national team. She debuted on 28 October 2021, in an unstreamed game against the Republic of Ireland. She has played in the UEFA U-17 Championship qualifications.
