= IFA Women's Challenge Cup =

Women's football cup competition in Northern Ireland

- Founded: 2005
- Region: Northern Ireland
- Teams: 40
- Current champions: Cliftonville (3rd title)
- Most championships: Glentoran (11 titles)
- 2026 IFA Women's Challenge Cup

For the equivalent tournament in the Republic of Ireland, see FAI Women's Cup.

The IFA Women's Challenge Cup or Irish Women's Cup is the annual cup competition of women's football teams in Northern Ireland. Currently branded as Electric Ireland Women's Challenge Cup due to sponsorship. It was first contested in 2005.

== Format ==
The eight Women's Premiership teams enter the cup in the third round. Up to 32 other teams enter in the first round, if more enter a preliminary round is played.

== Sponsors ==
Years	Sponsor
2005 - 2006	Nationwide Building Society
2007	None
2008 - 2011	Coca-Cola
2012 - 2016	None
2017 - 2024	Electric Ireland
2025 -	None

== List of finals ==
Season	Champion	Result	Runner-up
2005	Crusaders Strikers	2–0	Northland Raiders
2006	Glentoran	3–0	Northland Raiders
2007	Glentoran	2–1	Crusaders Strikers
2008	Glentoran	4–0	Linfield
2009	Glentoran	1–0	Crusaders Strikers
2010	Glentoran	1–0	Crusaders Strikers
2011	Crusaders Strikers	2–0	Glentoran
2012	Glentoran	3–2	Crusaders Strikers
2013	Linfield	2–1	Crusaders Strikers
2014	Linfield	(2–2 a.e.t) (8–7 pen)	Newry City
2015	Cliftonville	4–1	Crusaders Strikers
2016	Linfield	2–1	Cliftonville
2017	Sion Swifts	2–0	Newry City
2018	Glentoran	2–1	Linfield
2019	Glentoran	1–0	Linfield
2020	Cancelled due to COVID-19 pandemic		
2021	Glentoran	2–0	Crusaders Strikers
2022	Glentoran	2–1	Sion Swifts
2023	Glentoran	3–0	Cliftonville
2024	Cliftonville	5–0	Lisburn Rangers
2025	Cliftonville	2–0	Linfield
2026	Glentoran	(0–0 a.e.t) (4–2 pen)	Cliftonville

== Performance by club ==
Club	Winners	Runners-up	Winning years	Runners-up years
Glentoran	12	1	2006, 2007, 2008, 2009, 2010, 2012, 2018, 2019, 2021, 2022, 2023, 2026	2011
Cliftonville	3	3	2015, 2024, 2025	2016, 2023, 2026
Linfield	3	4	2013, 2014, 2016	2008, 2018, 2019, 2025
Crusaders Strikers	2	7	2005, 2011	2007, 2009, 2010, 2012, 2013, 2015, 2017
Sion Swifts	1	1	2017	2022
Northland Raiders	0	2	—	2005, 2006
Newry City	0	2	—	2014, 2017
Lisburn Rangers	0	1	—	2024
