= Sunday football in Northern Ireland =

Prohibition of football matches on Sunday

Sunday football in Northern Ireland has been a controversial issue. Until 2008, the Irish Football Association (IFA) under IFA Article 27, prohibited any clubs affiliated with them from playing association football matches on Sunday. The ban initially came from various government legislation, both local and national. Northern Ireland's Protestant Christian majority's observance of Sunday as the Sabbath (a day of rest), was also a major factor which amounted to a continuance of the observance of tradition for much longer than in the rest of the UK. It was also a way to combat a perceived encroachment on their culture by Catholics. Since the abolition of the ban, teams can play matches on Sunday if they have mutual agreement, although some teams such as Linfield have club rules against such games.

The Northern Ireland national team also had a policy of not playing on Sundays. This policy was later amended to allow Northern Ireland to play on Sundays away from home before being unofficially suspended due to changes in UEFA rules regarding playing dates for international competition qualifiers. On 29 March 2015, the national team played their first home match on a Sunday against Finland.

== History ==
Discouragement of recreation on Sunday, the Christian Sabbath, was a feature of the Puritan Sabbatarianism of the 17th century, which influenced the Sunday Observance Act 1695 passed by the Parliament of Ireland, which made it illegal to take part in sports, stating, "by reason of tumultuous and disorderly meetings, which have been, and frequently are used on the Lord's-day, commonly called Sunday, under pretence of hurling, commoning, football-playing, cudgels, wrestling, or other sports". In the 19th century in the United Kingdom, Protestants and urban areas tended to favour stricter observance of the Sabbath than rural areas and Roman Catholics. The Factory Acts facilitated urban working-class recreation on Saturday afternoons, whereas farm labourers work all day Saturday. The IFA for decades after its 1880 foundation was strongest around industrial Belfast, and many clubs were of Protestant workmen.

In its early decades, the IFA's rules had no explicit prohibition on Sunday play, but requests for explicit permission were routinely refused. (When the prohibition was removed in 2006, media said the rule was 60 years old.) Sabbatarian members sometimes advocated use of the 1695 act to enforce this, but the Royal Irish Constabulary from 1872 only used to invoke the act if a game was likely to cause a breach of the peace. In 1898, the Leinster Football Association requested permission for matches on Sunday, which was unanimously rejected by the IFA as "very detrimental to the interests of the game". In 1901, the Munster Football Association made a similar request which was also turned down. In 1898, Belfast Celtic rented Celtic Park for a Sunday hurling match and was suspended by the IFA until it promised not to do so in future. In 1906 the IFA passed a rule prohibiting clubs from renting grounds to any sports club which played on Sundays.

While the IFA maintained a ban on Sunday football for all senior and junior men's football, matches outside IFA auspices were sometimes played on Sundays. The independent Northern Ireland Women's Football Association (NIWFA) played their matches on Sundays. The Gaelic Athletic Association opposed association football and its matches were on Sunday, reducing the Catholic/nationalist constituency within the IFA. The Football Association of Ireland (FAI) was formed in 1921 in Southern Ireland by Leinster clubs splitting from the IFA due to its alleged bias in favour of Belfast; one of the FAI's first actions was to permit Sunday matches under its jurisdiction.

== Effect ==
The IFA ban on football on Sundays was strictly enforced so that no club affiliated with the IFA could play football in Northern Ireland on Sundays. This included the Northern Ireland national team who also refused to play international matches on Sunday. Before the 1958 FIFA World Cup, it was noted that Northern Ireland would play Czechoslovakia on a Sunday. As a result, the IFA relaxed its Sunday football ban to permit the Northern Ireland national team to play football on Sundays outside of Northern Ireland. In 2001, Cliftonville attempted to play a friendly match against Derry City, who are based in County Londonderry but are affiliated with the FAI, on a Sunday. The IFA initially permitted this, but the match was cancelled after complaints from the North West of Ireland Football Association (an IFA subsidiary based in County Londonderry) despite Cliftonville arguing that since Derry City organised it, it was outside of the IFA's jurisdiction. The ban was also identified as causing problems for ethnic minority players; the Chinese Football Association Northern Ireland, whose players mostly work in the catering industry, noted that its members often had "no choice" but to play on Sundays and pointed out the ban interfered with outreach efforts.

== Abolition of ban ==
Towards the start of the 21st century, several clubs made moves to abolish the ban on Sunday football in Northern Ireland. In 2000 Newry Town put forward a motion to play football on Sunday on commercial grounds. However, it was rejected by the IFA overwhelmingly on moral grounds despite Newry Town stating they "do not wish to impinge on anyone's Christian or moral ethics." In 2003, Cliftonville started a campaign to permit Sunday football if both clubs consented. In 2005, Armagh City and Ballynure Old Boys made a similar request to play on Sundays. Again the IFA rejected it on the grounds that it would interfere with the NIWFA's fixtures. A year later, the request was made again and members of the IFA voted in favour of it 69-28 however they failed to reach a 75% majority needed due to the NIWFA's clubs voting against it and thus the Sunday football ban remained in place. Maintaining the ban meant that Northern Ireland was the only country in UEFA which had a ban on Sunday football. This decision was criticised in the media who viewed the ban as outdated. Howard Wells, the IFA chief executive, took legal advice after it was suggested that the ban on Sunday football might not be supported in the European Court of Human Rights if a lawsuit was brought against them. After the failure of the 2006 motion, the predicted legal challenge, supported by the Equality Commission, emerged on the grounds of religious discrimination.

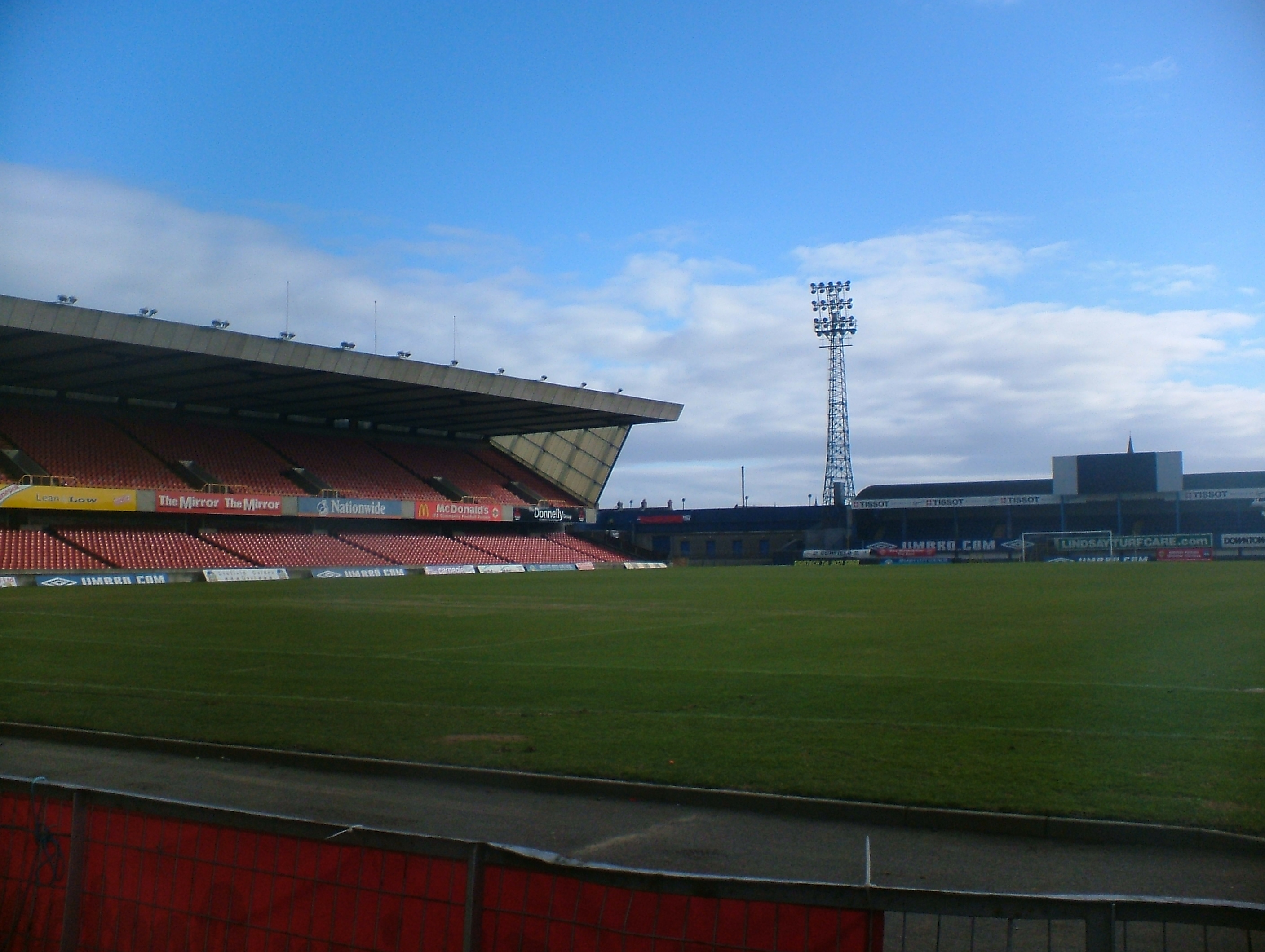
Sunday morning at Windsor Park. Linfield, owners of the stadium, have it written in their constitution that the team can not play there on a Sunday

In 2007, despite opposition from the Democratic Unionist Party, the IFA voted 91–14 to remove IFA Article 27 from their constitution. It was replaced by IFA Article 36.b, which stated that no football would be scheduled on Sunday, but matches on Sunday could be played if both teams and the organising competition agreed. It also stated that no player or club could be punished if they refused to play on Sunday. The ban on Sunday football in Northern Ireland was lifted on 1 June 2008. The first match held on Sunday since the ban was lifted was an Irish Premiership match between Glentoran and Bangor at The Oval. Before the match there was a protest against it by members of the Free Presbyterian Church of Ulster led by Reverend David McIlveen. Despite the lifting of the ban on Sunday football, Article 36.b has been used very rarely. Matches in the Irish Cup continue to not be scheduled on Sundays.

Some clubs maintain a club ban on Sunday football. Linfield, the owners of Windsor Park, used as the home ground of the Northern Ireland national team, had it written in their club rules in Article 24 that no games would be permitted on their grounds on Sundays. Since this could have prevented Windsor Park hosting cup finals or international matches, Linfield members voted to change Article 24 to state that no games involving Linfield could take place at Windsor Park on Sundays. They later amended this in 2020 to say they would allow Linfield to play on a Sunday at home only if Linfield had European commitments during the week. Ballymena United decided to play a friendly tournament in the Republic of Ireland on a Sunday. As a result, one of their sponsors pulled out of the club.

Despite the scrapping of the ban on Sunday football, the Northern Ireland national team continued to negotiate the fixture dates of friendlies and international competition qualifiers so that they were not on Sundays. In 2014, UEFA changed the match date allocation for qualifying competitions from mutual agreement between associations to randomly selected dates from a computer. The IFA were informed this might mean matches on Sunday and they signed an agreement prior to the draw for UEFA Euro 2016 qualifying. When the draw was made, it was determined that Northern Ireland would play Finland at home on 29 March 2015 in Northern Ireland's first international match at home on Sunday. Jim Allister, leader of the Traditional Unionist Voice party, questioned the choice of date; the IFA replied that they had no control over it but accepted that some fans might boycott the match because it was on a Sunday. In 2023, a motion was put forward at the IFA's AGM to abolish the remaining restrictions on Sunday football for matches held in the Northern Ireland Football League. However the motion failed on a 104-27 vote of the IFA's member clubs.

In 2024, the Northern Ireland Football League Cup put forward regulations that stated that clubs that entered would agree to waive objections to Sunday football for the latter stages and that they could schedule earlier rounds on Sunday. Loughgall appealed against this, as well as a broadcast agreement that paid clubs more to play on Sunday, on religious grounds as a breach of the IFA's regulations on Sunday football. In August, the IFA upheld their appeal on the grounds that it was discriminating against Loughgall's religious beliefs. In 2025, the IFA passed a motion to allow scheduled Sunday NIFL football with 76% in favour, though it still granted individual clubs the right to opt out of playing on Sunday.

== Bibliography ==
- Garnham, Neal (2013). Association Football and Society in Pre-partition Ireland. Routledge. ISBN 978-1-135-23030-2.
