= Larne F.C. Women =

Women's football club

Larne Women
- Full name: Larne Football Club Women
- Founded: 2004
- Stadium: Inver Park
- Capacity: 3000
- Manager: Daniel Carlisle
- League: Championship
- 2025: 8th Women's Premiership
- Website: larnefc.com/womens-team/
Home colours	Away colours

Larne Football Club Women is a women's football club from Larne, Northern Ireland. They currently play in the Women's Premiership, 2023 being their first season in the top flight. They are the women's team of the current NIFL Men's Champions Larne FC.

== History ==
Larne women's team were originally formed in November 2004, before being reincorporated back into the club in 2018, having been previously dormant for a number of years. In their inaugural season, they finished the season as the unbeaten North 2 League Champions, and also as beaten finalists in the North 2 League Cup. They now for the first time play in the top tier in 2023 (NIFL Women's Premiership) of the Northern Ireland Women's football league system after 4 consecutive promotions.

== Titles ==
- NIWFA Championship

Winners: 2022

- NIWFA Division 1

Winners: 2021
