= Northern Ireland Women's Football Association =

Governing body of women's association football in Northern Ireland

UEFA
- Founded: 1977
- UEFA affiliation: 1998
- IFA affiliation: 1993
- Website: https://niwfa.pitchero.com/

The Northern Ireland Women's Football Association (NIWFA) is the governing body of women's association football in Northern Ireland. It was founded in 1977.

== History ==
Prior to 1977, there was no organizing body for women's football in Northern Ireland. Following the case of the Republic of Ireland forming the Women's Football Association of Ireland. The Women's football association of Ireland catered to 6,500 who played for 350 teams. The NIWFA was founded in 1977 to be the governing body in Northern Ireland. Prior to official foundation, the inaugural meeting was held in 1976 to form a national league to be played in the summer with 35 minutes each half. The league initially was formed of 18 NIWFA associated teams, however this number later rose to 50. In 1993, the NIWFA became affiliated with the men's Irish Football Association (IFA) but retained sole control of women's football in Northern Ireland. In 1998, the NIWFA became fully integrated with the IFA with the IFA becoming responsible for development of women's football in Northern Ireland while the NIWFA retained its separate identity. Since 2001 the NIWFA has had a representative on the IFA Council. This agreement also allowed the NIWFA to continue playing their league matches on Sundays instead of joining the IFA who had banned Sunday football until 2008.

== Competitions ==
The NIWFA is responsible for the running of women's competitions in Northern Ireland. They run the Women's Premier League and the IFA Women's Challenge Cup as the major competitions. The NIWFA has the authority to discipline and fine clubs as well as the authority to remove them from competition if clubs fail to fulfill fixtures or lack the sufficient number of players. Both were factors in the NIWFA ejecting and banning Fermanagh Mallards F.C. from the Women's Premier League in 2013.
