= Johnny Burnett (baseball) =

American baseball player (1904–1959)

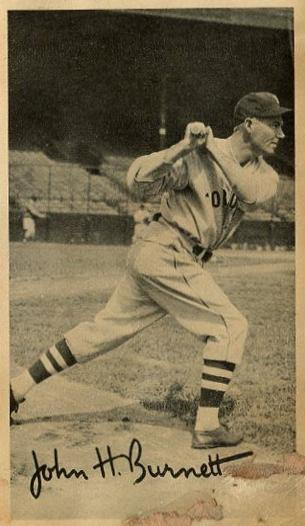
- Shortstop / Third baseman / Second baseman
- Born: November 1, 1904 (Note: MLB.com and baseball reference sites list Burnett's date of birth as November 1, 1904. His draft registration card of February 1942 listed his date of birth as November 1, 1903.); Bartow, Florida, U.S.
- Died: August 12, 1959 (aged 54); Tampa, Florida, U.S.
- Batted: Left Threw: Right

MLB debut
- May 7, 1927, for the Cleveland Indians

Last MLB appearance
- September 29, 1935, for the St. Louis Brown Stars

MLB statistics
- Batting average: .284
- Hits: 521
- Home runs: 9
- Runs batted in: 213
- Stats at Baseball Reference

Teams
- Cleveland Indians (1927–1934); St. Louis Browns (1935)

Career highlights and awards
- MLB records: Most hits by a player in a single game: 9

John Henderson Burnett (November 1, 1904 – August 12, 1959) was an American professional baseball player who appeared primarily as a shortstop, third baseman and second baseman in Major League Baseball (MLB) from 1927 to 1935 for the Cleveland Indians and St. Louis Browns. Burnett holds the record for most hits in a single game in MLB history with nine.

== Biography ==
Born in Bartow, Florida, Burnett made his major-league debut for the Cleveland Indians at the age of 22 on May 7, 1927, against the Philadelphia Athletics after graduating from the University of Florida. Burnett wore uniform number 1 in all eight of his seasons with the Indians. In 1930, Burnett's first season as an everyday starter, he was batting above .300 into July when, on July 19, he broke his wrist and was sidelined for the season. Without Burnett, the Indians finished eight games above .500.

On July 10, 1932, still playing for the Indians, Burnett set the major-league record for hits in a single game, compiling nine hits in 11 at bats in an 18-inning game against the Philadelphia Athletics. Burnett's record for most hits in a game still stands. He was also the first player to have more than seven hits in a game that went into extra innings. Since then, only Rocky Colavito in 1962, Cesar Gutierrez in 1970, Rennie Stennett in 1975, and Brandon Crawford in 2016 have collected seven or more hits in single game.

In late 1934, in the waning years of his career, after eight seasons with the Indians, Burnett was traded to the St. Louis Browns for outfielder Bruce Campbell. Wearing number 4, Burnett played only one season for the Browns before being traded to the Cincinnati Reds near the start of the 1936 season for first baseman Jim Bottomley. Burnett never played a game for the Reds, his final major-league appearance having been on September 29, 1935.

Overall during his major-league career, Burnett had a .284 average with nine home runs and 213 runs batted in (RBIs) in 558 MLB games. Defensively, he played 265 games at shortstop, while also making over 100 appearances at third base (133) and second base (103), along with three games in the outfield; 2 as a right fielder and one as left fielder. As a shortstop, he had a .935 fielding percentage, below the .941 average fielding percentage for shortstops across the MLB during his playing career.

Burnett finished his professional career playing three seasons in Minor League Baseball. He spent 1936 with the Toronto Maple Leafs of the International League, 1937 with three different teams (the Portland Beavers of the Pacific Coast League, and two teams in the Texas League), and 1938 with the Columbia Reds of the South Atlantic League. He played at least 320 minor-league games, although records of minor league baseball during that era are incomplete. In 1938 and 1939, he served as manager of the Columbia team.

Burnett died in Tampa, Florida, on August 12, 1959, at the age of 54 from acute leukemia.

=== Nine-hit game ===
Burnett's nine hits came in 11 at bats on July 10, 1932, while batting second and playing shortstop, as listed below. He also scored four runs and had two runs batted in (RBIs), and defensively committed one error while recording five putouts and five assists. His team lost, as the Athletics defeated the Indians in 18 innings by a score of 18–17.

Inning	Result	Cumulative	Notes
1st	Single	1-for-1	Later scored
2nd	Single	2-for-2	
4th	Single	3-for-3	Later scored
5th	Double	4-for-4	RBI
7th	Single	5-for-5	Later scored
7th	Struck out	5-for-6	
9th	Single	6-for-7	RBI†
11th	Double	7-for-8	
13th	Single	8-for-9	
16th	Single	9-for-10	Later scored
17th	Flied out	9-for-11	

† Burnett's two-out RBI in the bottom of the ninth inning tied the game, 15–15, resulting in extra innings.

== See also ==
- List of Major League Baseball single-game hits leaders
- List of Florida Gators baseball players
