= Women's Premiership (Northern Ireland) =

- Founded: 2004
- Country: Northern Ireland
- Confederation: UEFA
- Divisions: 1
- Number of clubs: 8
- Level on pyramid: 1
- Relegation to: Women's Championship
- Domestic cup: Irish Women's Cup
- League cup: NIFL Women's Premiership League Cup
- International cup: UEFA Women's Champions League
- Current champions: Cliftonville (3rd title) (2026)
- Most championships: Glentoran (11 titles)
- Top scorer: Caitlin McGuinness (108 goals)
- Broadcaster: DAZN
- Website: nifootballleague.com/womens-premiership
- Current: 2026 Women's Premiership

The Women's Premiership is the top level women's football league of Northern Irish league football. The league was called the NIWFA Division League 1 until 2003 and Premier League until 2015. In 2016, it was rebranded the Women's Premiership and is run by NIFL/ Irish League since.

Ten teams play a double round robin to crown the champion, which qualifies for a spot in the UEFA Women's Champions League. The tenth place gets relegated to the Women's Championship 1, the ninth place plays a two-legged relegation playoff against the runner up of the Women's Championship.

== History ==
In women's football the first league season was played out in 1977. Organised by the Northern Ireland Women's Football Association (NIWFA) the league was simply called the NIWFA Division League 1.

In 2004 the Division 1 was replaced by the Women's Premier League.

In 2016, after 40 years of administering and developing women's football locally, the league was rebranded the Women's Premiership and is run now by the Northern Ireland Football League. The main sponsor and name giver is Sports Direct.

Prior to the 2023 season, the Premiership introduced professional contracts for players, as well as games on Fridays and Sundays in addition to traditional Wednesday games. Five Premiership teams will also take part in a new all-island competition during the summer.

=== Sponsors ===
Period	Sponsor
2016–2022	Danske Bank
2023–	Sports Direct

== 2026 Teams ==
The following teams make up the 2026 season.

Location of teams in the 2026 season

Teams are listed in alphabetical order.

Team	Location	Stadium	Capacity
Cliftonville	Belfast (Oldpark)	Solitude	2,530
Crusaders Strikers	Belfast (Shore Road)	Seaview	3,383
Derry City	Derry	Brandywell Stadium	6,300
Glentoran	Belfast (Sydenham)	Blanchflower Stadium	1,100
Larne	Larne	Inver Park	3,250
Linfield	Belfast (Boucher Road)	New Midgley Park	n/a
Lisburn Ladies	Lisburn	Bluebell Stadium	1,280
Lisburn Rangers	Lisburn	Crewe Park	n/a

== List of champions ==
Before 2004 the winner of the Division 1 league was national champion. The first season was played out in 1977.

Season	Champion	Runner-up
	1977–1998 unknown	
1999	Lisburn Distillery Predators	
2000	Lisburn Distillery Predators	
2001	Lisburn Distillery Predators	
2002	Crusaders Strikers	
2003	Crusaders Strikers	
2004	Glentoran	Northland Raiders
2005	Crusaders Strikers	Glentoran
2006	Glentoran	Crusaders Strikers
2007	Glentoran	Crusaders Strikers
2008	Glentoran	Crusaders Strikers
2009	Crusaders Strikers	Glentoran
2010	Crusaders Strikers	Glentoran
2011	Glentoran	Crusaders Strikers
2012	Crusaders Strikers	Glentoran
2013	Glentoran	Crusaders Strikers
2014	Glentoran	Linfield
2015	Newry City	Linfield
2016	Linfield	Cliftonville
2017	Linfield	Sion Swifts
2018	Linfield	Glentoran
2019	Linfield	Sion Swifts
2020	Glentoran	Linfield
2021	Glentoran	Cliftonville
2022	Cliftonville	Glentoran
2023	Glentoran	Cliftonville
2024	Cliftonville	Glentoran
2025	Glentoran	Cliftonville
2026	Cliftonville	Glentoran

Northern Irish championships
Titles	Team
11	Glentoran
6	Crusaders Strikers
4	Linfield
3	Lisburn Distillery Predators
3	Cliftonville
1	Newry City

List only includes known titles (misses 1977–1998).

== Top goalscorers ==
Season	Player	Team	Goals
2019	(Northern Ireland) Kirsty McGuinness	Cliftonville	32
2020	(Northern Ireland) Kirsty McGuinness	Cliftonville	11
2021	(Northern Ireland) Kerry Beattie	Glentoran	23
2022	(Northern Ireland) Caitlin McGuinness	Cliftonville	20
2023	(Northern Ireland) Kerry Beattie	Glentoran	28
2024	(Northern Ireland) Cora Chambers	Linfield	19
2025	(Northern Ireland) E Reilly	Linfield	17
2026	(Northern Ireland) Cora Chambers	Linfield	19
