= 2021 FAI Women's Cup final =

FAI Women's Cup Final

- Match programme cover
- Event: 2021 FAI Women's Cup
Wexford Youths	Shelbourne
3	1
- Date: 21 November 2021
- Venue: Tallaght Stadium, Dublin
- Player of the Match: Ellen Molloy (Wexford Youths)
- Referee: Paula Brady (Dublin)
- Attendance: 3,053

The 2021 FAI Women's Cup final (known as The EVOKE.ie FAI Women's Cup Final for sponsorship reasons) was the final match of the 2021 FAI Women's Cup, the national association football Cup of the Republic of Ireland. The match took place on 21 November 2021 at Tallaght Stadium in Dublin. Wexford Youths and Shelbourne contested the match.

The match was shown live on RTÉ2 and RTÉ2 HD in Ireland, and via the RTÉ Player worldwide with commentary from Ger Canning and Lisa Fallon. It was refereed by Paula Brady, assisted by David Berry and Conor Fitzgibbon with Claire Purcell as Fourth Official. The 3,053 attendance was a record for a stand-alone women's final in Ireland.

Wexford Youths won 3–1 to secure the trophy for the fourth time in seven seasons and avenge their 5–0 defeat by Shelbourne in the 2016 final. Shelbourne, crowned League champions the previous week, missed the opportunity to claim a "double".

== Match ==
=== Summary ===
On 31 minutes Shelbourne captain Pearl Slattery was cautioned for a foul by the centre circle, and when Shelbourne failed to clear the resultant free kick, Lynn-Marie Grant hoisted the ball high over goalkeeper Amanda Budden from the edge of the penalty area to give Wexford the lead. Shelbourne equalised on 39 minutes when Jessica Ziu's firm shot came back off the base of the post and fell to Ciara Grant who looped the ball in off the other post.

Five minutes into the second half, Wexford retook the lead. Player of the Match Ellen Molloy cut inside from the right and crossed to Kylie Murphy, who finished low past Budden from 12 yards (11m). Saoirse Noonan broke clear on 60 minutes, but Wexford full-back Orlaith Conlon made a last ditch tackle in which she injured her knee and had to be substituted. On 74 minutes Molloy was involved in Wexford's third goal, when after having a shot blocked she headed the ball to Edel Kennedy on the edge of the Shelbourne penalty area. Kennedy hit a powerful half volley past Budden to score the best goal of the game.

After their unexpected League title win the previous week, Shelbourne's players had partied until 7am at Tolka Park. Fatigue contributed their lacklustre performance in the Cup final. Although Wexford substitute Teegan Lynch had apparently not been listed in the matchday squad, Shelbourne declined to raise any complaint and instead congratulated their opponents: "the better team on the night".

=== Details ===
21 November 2021
17:30 BST

Wexford Youths	3–1	Shelbourne
L. Grant 31'; Murphy 50'; Kennedy 74'	Report	C. Grant 39'

Tallaght Stadium, Dublin
Attendance: 3,053
Referee: Paula Brady (Dublin)

Wexford	Shelbourne

GK	18	(Republic of Ireland) Ciamh Gray
DF	3	(Republic of Ireland) Orlaith Conlon	(substituted off) 60'
DF	4	(Republic of Ireland) Della Doherty
DF	5	(Republic of Ireland) Lauren Dwyer
DF	16	(Republic of Ireland) Nicola Sinnott
MF	8	(Republic of Ireland) Edel Kennedy
MF	12	(Republic of Ireland) Ciara Rossiter
MF	17	(Republic of Ireland) Aoibheann Clancy
MF	19	(Republic of Ireland) Lynn-Marie Grant	(substituted off) 72'
AM	20	(Republic of Ireland) Ellen Molloy	(substituted off) 93'
FW	6	(Republic of Ireland) Kylie Murphy (c)
Substitutions:
GK	21	(Republic of Ireland) Maeve Williams
MF	7	(Republic of Ireland) Freya De Mange
FW	9	(Republic of Ireland) Katie Law
FW	10	(Republic of Ireland) Sinead Taylor	(substituted on) 93'
DF	11	(Republic of Ireland) Lynn Craven	(substituted on) 60'
MF	23	(Republic of Ireland) Fiona Ryan
FW	23	(Republic of Ireland) Emma Walker
FW	24	(Republic of Ireland) Kira Bates-Crosbie
MF	2	(Republic of Ireland) Teegan Lynch (Note: RTÉ coverage of the match noted that Wexford Youths' second substitute Teegan Lynch was not named in the matchday squad.)	(substituted on) 72'
Manager:
(Republic of Ireland) Stephen Quinn

GK	1	(Republic of Ireland) Amanda Budden
DF	2	(Republic of Ireland) Jess Gargan		(substituted off) 80'
DF	4	(Republic of Ireland) Pearl Slattery (c)	(yellow card) 31'
DF	5	(Republic of Ireland) Shauna Fox
DF	14	(Republic of Ireland) Chloe Mustaki
MF	3	(Republic of Ireland) Jessie Stapleton
MF	7	(Republic of Ireland) Jessica Ziu
MF	8	(Republic of Ireland) Rachel Graham	(yellow card) 44'	(substituted off) 80'
MF	12	(Republic of Ireland) Ciara Grant
AM	10	(Republic of Ireland) Noelle Murray
FW	25	(Republic of Ireland) Saoirse Noonan
Substitutions:
GK	16	(Republic of Ireland) Sophie Lenehan
MF	6	(Republic of Ireland) Alex Kavanagh		(substituted on) 80'
DF	9	(Republic of Ireland) Keeva Keenan
MF	13	(Republic of Ireland) Mia Dodd
FW	18	(Republic of Ireland) Abbie Larkin		(substituted on) 80'
MF	19	(Republic of Ireland) Leah Doyle
MF	20	(Republic of Ireland) Rebecca Creagh
MF	21	(Republic of Ireland) Taylor White
Manager:
(Republic of Ireland) Noel King

Match officials

- Assistant referees:
  - David Berry
  - Conor Fitzgibbon
- Fourth official: Claire Purcell

Match rules

- 90 minutes.
- 20 minutes of extra time if necessary.
- Penalty shoot-out if scores level.
- Eight substitutes named.
- Maximum of five substitutions.
