= Abbie Larkin =

Irish footballer (born 2005)

Personal information
- Full name: Abbie Sheila Larkin
- Date of birth: 27 April 2005 (age 21)
- Place of birth: Ringsend, Dublin, Ireland
- Height: 1.67 m (5 ft 6 in)
- Position: Forward

Team information
- Current team: Crystal Palace
- Number: 19

Youth career
- Cambridge Boys
- Home Farm
- Shelbourne

Senior career*
Years	Team	Apps	(Gls)
2021–2022	Shelbourne		(9)
2023	Shamrock Rovers	15	(5)
2023–2024	Glasgow City	9	(2)
2024–	Crystal Palace	40	(9)

International career^{‡}
2022–	Republic of Ireland	39	(5)
- * Club domestic league appearances and goals as of 5 June 2026 ‡ National team caps and goals as of 18 October 2026

Abbie Sheila Larkin (born 27 April 2005) is an Irish professional footballer who plays as a forward for Women's Super League club Crystal Palace and the Republic of Ireland national team.

== Club career ==
Larkin is from Ringsend and played youth football for the local team Cambridge FC. At nine years old Larkin was accepted into The Metropolitan Girls League Academy two years earlier than the usual admission age of 11. She also played at youth level for Home Farm, before joining Shelbourne.

In May 2021, Shelbourne manager Noel King dual-signed Larkin to the club's senior panel from their Women's Under 17 National League squad. She scored on her senior club debut, after entering play as an 84th-minute substitute for Saoirse Noonan in Shelbourne's 5–0 Women's National League win over Athlone Town at Tolka Park on 5 June 2021.

In October 2021, Larkin made her first start for Shelbourne when Noelle Murray fell ill and was unable to play in a league match against Galway. Larkin was named player of the match, after scoring a goal and assisting another in Shelbourne's 2–0 win, which was televised live by TG4. Shelbourne overhauled Peamount United on a dramatic final day to win the 2021 Women's National League title. Larkin also played in the 2021 FAI Women's Cup Final, but Shelbourne were beaten 3–1 by Wexford Youths.

Shelbourne announced that Larkin had signed for another season at the end of a successful 2022 Women's National League campaign, in which she helped the club secure a League and Cup double. However they were disappointed when Larkin subsequently experienced "a change of heart" and instead moved to newly reformed Shamrock Rovers alongside some other Shelbourne players. A controversial and swiftly-deleted tweet on the Shelbourne club account, referencing The Red Flag lyrics 'Though cowards flinch and traitors sneer', was perceived as being aimed at the departing players and attracted "huge criticism", particularly given Larkin's youth.

In September 2023, Larkin joined Glasgow City. She scored nine goals in sixteen matches across all competitions, before moving to Crystal Palace in January 2024.

== International career ==
=== Youth ===
Larkin represented Ireland at schoolgirl level while she attended Ringsend College. She progressed to the Republic of Ireland women's national under-17 football team and served as captain in their 2022 UEFA Women's Under-17 Championship qualification campaign.

=== Senior ===
Larkin was called up to the senior Republic of Ireland squad for the first time in February 2022, for the 2022 Pinatar Cup in Murcia. She required her parents' permission to miss school for the trip. She won her first cap on 19 February 2022 in a 1–0 defeat by Russia and appeared as a half-time substitute for Kyra Carusa in a 1–0 win over Wales.

On 27 June 2022, Larkin scored her first goal for Ireland on the occasion of her fourth cap, in a 9–0 World Cup qualification win over Georgia in Gori. Coach Vera Pauw was impressed by Larkin's impact: "She's only 17-years-old, but I hope that everybody has seen how talented she is."

In July 2023, Larkin was selected in the 23-woman squad for the 2023 FIFA Women's World Cup. She made her World Cup debut in the 1–0 loss to co-hosts Australia, coming on as a substitute for Sinead Farrelly, and in doing so, became the youngest player (male or female) to represent the Republic. She would go on to make two more substitute appearances, as the Republic finished bottom of their group with one point.

On 28 October 2025, Larkin scored a 90th-minute goal in the second leg of a Nations League play-off against Belgium to earn Ireland promotion to League A.

== Personal life ==
One of Larkin's cousins is fellow professional footballer Daniel Kelly, who plays for Shelbourne.

== Career statistics ==
=== International ===
As of 13 October 2026

Appearances and goals by national team and year
National team	Year	Apps	Goals
Republic of Ireland	2022	4	1
Republic of Ireland	2023	11	0
Republic of Ireland	2024	6	0
Republic of Ireland	2025	10	2
Republic of Ireland	2026	8	2
Total		39	5

Scores and results list Republic of Ireland's goal tally first, score column indicates score after each Larkin goal.

List of international goals scored by Abbie Larkin
No.	Date	Venue	Opponent	Score	Result	Competition
1	27 June 2022	Tengiz Burjanadze Stadium, Gori, Georgia	Georgia	8–0	9–0	2023 FIFA Women's World Cup qualification
2	28 October 2025	Den Dreef, Leuven, Belgium	Belgium	1–2	1–2	2025 UEFA Nations League play-offs
3	29 November 2025	Pinatar Arena, Murcia, Spain	Hungary	1–0	3–2	Friendly
4	5 June 2026	Páirc Uí Chaoimh, Cork, Ireland	Netherlands	2–1	3–2	2027 FIFA Women's World Cup qualification
5	9 October 2026	Astana Arena, Astana, Kazakhstan	Kazakhstan	5–0	8–0	2027 FIFA Women's World Cup qualification play-offs
