= Chloe Mustaki =

Irish footballer (born 1995)

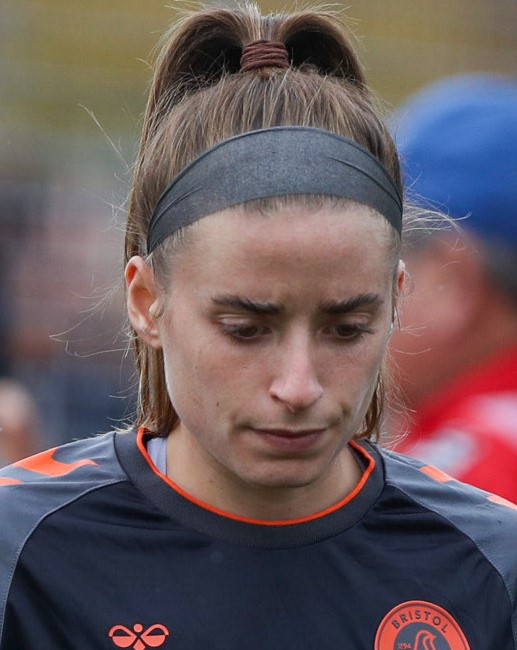
- Mustaki with Bristol City in 2022.

Personal information
- Full name: Chloe Naomi Mustaki
- Date of birth: 29 July 1995 (age 31)
- Place of birth: Lima, Ohio, U.S.
- Height: 5 ft 5 in (1.65 m)
- Positions: Defender; midfielder

Team information
- Current team: Nottingham Forest
- Number: 5

Youth career
- 2002–2008: Park Celtic
- 2008–2011: St. Joseph's

Senior career*
Years	Team	Apps	(Gls)
2011–2014	Peamount United		
2014–2016	UCD Waves		
2016–2017	Girondins de Bordeaux	15	(0)
2017–2018	UCD Waves		
2019	Shelbourne		
2019–2020	Charlton Athletic	6	(0)
2021–2022	Shelbourne	22	(0)
2022–2025	Bristol City	35	(0)
2025–	Nottingham Forest	26	(0)

International career^{‡}
2012–2014	Republic of Ireland U19	28	(2)
2022–	Republic of Ireland	20	(1)
- * Club domestic league appearances and goals as of 15 November 2026 ‡ National team caps and goals as of 9 October 2026

Chloe Naomi Mustaki (born 29 July 1995) is an Irish footballer who plays as a defender or midfielder for English Women's Super League 2 side Nottingham Forest. Born in the United States, and raised in France and Ireland, she is a member of the Republic of Ireland women's national team and also holds French citizenship.

At club level she has previously played for Shelbourne, UCD Waves and Peamount United in her home country, as well as for Girondins de Bordeaux in France and Charlton Athletic and Bristol City in England.

Mustaki was the captain of the successful Republic of Ireland women's national under-19 football team which qualified for the UEFA Women's Under-19 Championship finals for the first time in 2014, reaching the semi-finals. She was called up for the senior Republic of Ireland women's national team for the first time in October 2019, winning her first cap in February 2022.

== Early life ==
Mustaki was born in Ohio to an Irish mother and a French father of Greek heritage, who had met at Boston University. They left the United States when Mustaki was one year old. The family then lived in Paris for two years, before Mustaki and her mother moved to Cabinteely upon the separation of Mustaki's parents. Mustaki played street football with her brother and his friends and progressed into organised youth soccer with Park Celtic boys and St. Joseph's.

== Club career ==
For the inaugural 2011–12 season of the Women's National League (WNL), 16-year-old Mustaki joined South Dublin club Peamount United. Seen as a promising midfielder, she helped Peamount secure the league title in her debut season.

Mustaki was one of several Peamount players to follow manager Eileen Gleeson to UCD Waves for 2014–15. In August 2014 Mustaki was diagnosed with Hodgkin lymphoma and underwent chemotherapy. When UCD Waves played in the 2014 FAI Women's Cup final against Raheny United in November, UCD's Áine O'Gorman celebrated her equalising goal by revealing a t-shirt with team-mate Mustaki's squad number 17 on it.

On 16 March 2015 Mustaki played her first football match since July 2014, when she came on as a substitute for UCD Waves against Raheny United at Morton Stadium.

While based at KEDGE Business School in Bordeaux on an Erasmus Programme placement, Mustaki played for Girondins de Bordeaux. She made 15 appearances in the 2016–17 Division 1 Féminine. After returning to Ireland Mustaki helped UCD Waves finish fourth in the 2017 Women's National League and reach the FAI Women's Cup final, which they lost 1–0 to Cork City at the Aviva Stadium.

Mustaki spent a season with Shelbourne in 2019, then signed for English FA Women's Championship club Charlton Athletic in November 2019. She made her debut in a 1–0 FA Women's League Cup win over London City Lionesses. A serious knee injury sustained on international duty curtailed Mustaki's season in March 2020, just before the COVID-19 pandemic prompted her London-based employer to allow her to work from home in Ireland. She rejoined Shelbourne for 2021. After helping Shelbourne win the 2021 WNL title and playing in the 3–1 2021 FAI Women's Cup Final defeat by Wexford Youths, Mustaki agreed to remain with the club for 2022.

In July 2022 Mustaki returned to English football, signing a one-year professional contract with Women's Championship club Bristol City. She made 14 appearances as part of the squad which won promotion to the Women's Super League during the 2022-23 season.

On 10 July 2025, it was announced that Mustaki had signed with Nottingham Forest. She won Nottingham Forrest's Players' Player of the Season and Coaches' Player of the Season for the 2025–26 season. Mustaki signed a new contract in July 2026 keeping her at the club until 2028.

== International career ==
=== Youth ===
Mustaki represented Ireland at schoolgirl level while she attended Lycée Français d'Irlande, Clonskeagh. She was named FAI Under-17 Women's International Player of the Year for 2011.

Mustaki was the captain of the Republic of Ireland women's national under-19 football team which qualified for the UEFA Women's Under-19 Championship finals for the first time in 2014. She featured in wins over Spain, England and Sweden as Ireland negotiated the group stage. They lost 4–0 to the Netherlands in the semi-final, for whom Vivianne Miedema scored a hat-trick. Mustaki was substituted after an hour and was frustrated at her conspicuous lack of energy. Shortly after returning home she was diagnosed with Hodgkin lymphoma.

While attached to University College Dublin Mustaki represented Ireland at the 2017 and 2019 Summer Universiades. She had also been selected for the 2015 edition in Gwangju, but withdrew on medical advice due to the 2015 MERS outbreak in South Korea.

=== Senior ===
New Republic of Ireland national team coach Vera Pauw called up Mustaki to the senior squad for the first time in October 2019, for the UEFA Women's Euro 2022 qualifier against Ukraine. She retained her squad place and – due to the unavailability of some regular players – was likely to win a debut cap in a March 2020 qualifying match against Greece, but suffered an anterior cruciate ligament injury in training the day before the game.

Mustaki earned her first cap for Ireland on 19 February 2022 against Russia at the 2022 Pinatar Cup. She made her first competitive appearance on 12 April 2022, playing as a left wing-back in a creditable 1–1 2023 FIFA Women's World Cup qualification – UEFA Group A draw with Sweden at Gamla Ullevi, Gothenburg.

== Personal life ==
Mustaki describes herself as Franco-Irish. She completed ERASMUS Programme placements in Bordeaux and Lisbon while completing her degree in International Commerce and French from University College Dublin (UCD). For her master's degree in International Management she took a placement in London. She then took a job in London with Maven Search in financial services: "I'm mostly headhunting investment bankers over in the States." While injured in 2020 Mustaki worked for Raidió Teilifís Éireann as a television pundit. In 2025 she qualified as a Health and Wellness Coach with the Health Coaches Academy.

Her boyfriend Greg Sloggett is also a footballer.

== Career statistics ==
Appearances and goals by national team and year
National team	Year	Apps	Goals
Republic of Ireland	2022	4	0
Republic of Ireland	2023	3	0
Republic of Ireland	2025	6	0
Republic of Ireland	2026	7	1
Total		20	1

List of international goals scored by Chloe Mustaki
No.	Date	Venue	Opponent	Score	Result	Competition
1.	9 October 2026	Astana Arena, Astana, Kazakhstan	Kazakhstan	2–0	8–0	2027 FIFA Women's World Cup qualification play-offs

== Honours ==
Bristol City

- FA Women's Championship: 2022-23
