= Kylie Murphy =

Irish footballer (born 1988)

Personal information
- Date of birth: 2 September 1988 (age 38)
- Place of birth: Carlow, Ireland
- Positions: Midfielder; forward

Team information
- Current team: Wexford Youths
- Number: 6

Youth career
- St Pat's Boys

Senior career*
Years	Team	Apps	(Gls)
2011–	Wexford Youths	250	(100)
- * Club domestic league appearances and goals as of 14:50, 21 November 2021 (UTC) ‡ National team caps and goals as of 14:50, 21 November 2021 (UTC)

Kylie Murphy (born 2 September 1988) is an Irish footballer who plays for Wexford Youths of the Women's National League (WNL). Predominantly a midfielder, she was successfully repurposed as a forward in 2021.

== Club career ==
Murphy joined Wexford Youths for the inaugural Women's National League (WNL) season in 2011–12, following a successful trial. Murphy had joined St Pat's boys' soccer club when she was six or seven years old, where she was the only girl in the team. She also played several other sports during her school days, but had stopped playing sports altogether for about two years before Wexford Youths manager John Flood persuaded her to join his team.

Immediately installed as the new club's captain, she made her debut in the opening day 2–2 home draw with Castlebar Celtic. Murphy was named club Player of the Season in May 2012. Towards the end of her first season Murphy suffered a slipped disc in her back while warming up for a match against Peamount United. She rejected medical advice to retire from football and returned a year later, receiving a guard of honour in her first match back, which was also against Peamount.

After returning to full fitness, Murphy was named in the Team of the Season as Wexford Youths won the WNL title for the first time in 2014–15, and she participated in the club's subsequent 2015–16 UEFA Women's Champions League campaign in August 2015. In November 2015, Murphy helped Wexford Youths win the FAI Women's Cup for the first time in the final at the Aviva Stadium. Ciara Rossiter's injury time equaliser helped them prevail over Shelbourne, 4–2 on penalties after a 2–2 draw.

Wexford Youths recaptured the WNL title in 2017, with Murphy named in the Team of the Season. In 2018, Murphy was again named in the WNL Team of the Season as the club won another Treble. In November 2019, Murphy scored the winning goal as she captained Wexford to a 3–2 win over Peamount in the FAI Women's Cup final at the Aviva Stadium. She made her 200th appearance for Wexford Youths in August 2020, marking the occasion with a goal in a 2–1 defeat by Shelbourne.

In 2021 Murphy – hitherto a central midfielder – was deployed as a centre-forward by Wexford Youths, who were trying to replace the loss of the prolific Rianna Jarrett. The experiment was a success as Murphy scored 15 WNL goals, just one behind top-scorer Áine O'Gorman, and was nominated for WNL Player of the Season. She scored again in the 2021 FAI Women's Cup Final, as Wexford Youths defeated Shelbourne 3–1, and was announced as the WNL Player of the Season winner on 1 December 2021. In January 2022 the Soccer Writers of Ireland named Murphy as their first ever Women's Personality of the Year.

During the 2022 season Murphy made her 250th appearance for Wexford Youths and also scored her 100th goal for the club. She now occupied a "number 10" role as the team challenged for the WNL title.

== International career ==
=== Youth ===
Murphy was part of the Republic of Ireland women's national under-19 football team during the qualifying rounds of the 2005 UEFA Women's Under-19 Championship.

=== Senior ===
Murphy's club coach Tom Elmes led calls for her to be given a chance at senior international level in 2018. Murphy felt that the opportunity had passed her by at 32 years old, but was disappointed not to have won a senior cap despite her consistently good form at club level.

== Honours ==
=== Player ===
Wexford Youths

- Women's National League: 2014–15, 2015–16, 2017, 2018
- FAI Women's Cup: 2015, 2018, 2019, 2021

Individual

- FAI Women's National League Team of the Season: 2014–15, 2017, 2018, 2019

== Personal life ==
Outside football Murphy works as a carpenter in her father's kitchen business. She played ladies' Gaelic football for Graiguecullen GAA and represented Laois GAA at minor level, before deciding to focus on association football. In August 2019 Murphy married her same-sex partner Essmay, then flew to Lithuania to play in the 2019–20 UEFA Women's Champions League qualifying round two days later.
