= 2021 FAI Women's Cup =

Tournament details
- Country: Ireland
- Venue(s): Tallaght Stadium, Dublin
- Dates: 13 August 2021 – 21 November 2021
- Teams: 9

Final positions
- Champions: Wexford Youths (4th title)
- Runners-up: Shelbourne

Tournament statistics
- Matches played: 8
- Goals scored: 20 (2.5 per match)
- Top goal scorer(s): Kylie Murphy (3 goals)

The 2021 FAI Women's Cup (known as The EVOKE.ie FAI Women's Cup for sponsorship reasons) is the 46th edition of Ireland's primary national knockout cup competition for women's association football teams. The nine Women's National League (WNL) teams entered the competition, but unlike in previous years no non-league teams took part. The competition began on 13 August 2021 with a single-fixture first round and concluded on 21 November 2021. The final was staged at the Tallaght Stadium in Dublin, which had also hosted the previous year's final.

The Cup holders Peamount United were eliminated at the semi-final stage.

== First round ==
The draw for the first round took place on 3 August 2021. Women's National League (WNL) clubs Bohemians and DLR Waves were selected to play in a single match first round, the winner of which was to join the other seven WNL clubs in the quarter-finals. Athlone Town, Galway and Treaty United received a bye to the quarter-finals, while the top four teams in the 2020 Women's National League (Peamount United, Shelbourne, Wexford Youths and Cork City) were exempt from the first round draw and qualified automatically for the quarter-finals.

Teams in bold advanced to the quarter-final.

First
- **Athlone Town**^{[Bye]}
- Bohemians
- **Cork City**^{[Bye]}
- **DLR Waves**
- **Galway**^{[Bye]}
- **Peamount United**^{[Bye]}
- **Shelbourne**^{[Bye]}
- **Treaty United**^{[Bye]}
- **Wexford Youths**^{[Bye]}

13 August 2021	**Bohemians**	**0–3**	**DLR Waves**	Phibsborough, Northside, Dublin
19:45 GMT		Report	Carla McManus 29'; Rachel Doyle 66'; Ciara Maher 90+3'	Stadium: Dalymount Park; Attendance: 200

== Quarter-finals ==
The draw for the quarter-finals took place on 27 August 2021. Teams in bold advanced to the semi-finals.

Quarter-final
- Athlone Town
- Cork City
- DLR Waves
- **Galway**
- **Peamount United**
- **Shelbourne**
- Treaty United
- **Wexford Youths**

4 September 2021	**Galway**	**1–0**	DLR Waves	Galway
19:30	Chloe Singleton 81'	Report		Stadium: Eamonn Deacy Park; Referee: Daniel Murphy

4 September 2021	**Shelbourne**	**1–0**	Cork City	Drumcondra, Northside, Dublin
14:00	Saoirse Noonan 79'	Report		Stadium: Tolka Park

4 September 2021	**Wexford Youths**	**3–1**	Athlone Town	Crossabeg
18:30	Ciara Rossiter 31', 74'; Ellen Molloy 89'	Report	Emily Corbet 19'	Stadium: Ferrycarrig Park; Attendance: N/A

5 September 2021	Treaty United	**0–2**	**Peamount United**	Limerick
14:00		Report	Tiegan Ruddy 46'; Lauryn O'Callaghan 68'	Stadium: Jackman Park; Attendance: N/A

== Semi-finals ==
The draw for the semi-finals was made by Vera Pauw on 8 September 2021. Both matches took place on 9 October 2021.

Quarter final
- Galway
- Peamount United
- Shelbourne
- Wexford Youths

9 October 2021	Shelbourne	1–0	Galway	Drumcondra, Northside, Dublin
14:00	Noelle Murray 30'	Report	Julie Ann Russell (yellow card) 62' (yellow-red card) 67'	Stadium: Tolka Park; Attendance: N/A; Referee: David Keeler

9 October 2021	Peamount United	1–3 (a.e.t.)	Wexford Youths	Newcastle, County Dublin
16:00	Áine O'Gorman 90+1'	Report	Kylie Murphy 35', 91'; Lynn Marie Grant 96'	Stadium: Greenogue; Attendance: N/A

== Final ==
21 November 2021	Wexford Youths	3–1	Shelbourne	Tallaght, Dublin
17:30	Lynn Marie Grant 32'; Kylie Murphy 50'; Edel Kennedy 74'	Report	Ciara Grant 39'	Stadium: Tallaght Stadium; Attendance: 3053; Referee: Paula Brady
Note: Live coverage on RTÉ2
