= Amanda Budden =

Irish footballer

Personal information
- Full name: Amanda Margaret Budden
- Date of birth: 9 May 1994 (age 32)
- Place of birth: Cork, Ireland
- Height: 5 ft 11 in (1.80 m)
- Position: Goalkeeper

Team information
- Current team: Shamrock Rovers
- Number: 1

Youth career
- Wilton United

College career
Years	Team	Apps	(Gls)
2012	CBU Capers	2	(0)

Senior career*
Years	Team	Apps	(Gls)
–2011	Wilton United		
2011–2018	Cork		
2020	Galway WFC		
2021–2022	Shelbourne	47	(0)
2023–2025	Shamrock Rovers	35	(0)
2025	Peamount United	19	(0)
2026–	Shamrock Rovers	4	(0)

International career^{‡}
2018	Republic of Ireland	1	(0)
- * Club domestic league appearances and goals as of 10 May 2026 ‡ National team caps and goals as of 10 May 2026

Amanda Margaret Budden (born 9 May 1994) is an Irish footballer who plays as a goalkeeper for Shamrock Rovers and has appeared for the Republic of Ireland women's national team.

== Club career ==
Budden is from Cork and began her soccer career with Wilton United. On 27 July 2008, she won the FAI Women's Under-14 National Cup, playing (outfield) in the final against Longford Town. On 7 August 2011, she kept goal in the FAI Women's Cup final, as Wilton United were defeated 3–1 by St Catherine's.

She joined newly-founded Cork Women's, one of the six teams that competed in the Women's National League's (WNL) inaugural 2011–12 season. On 13 November 2011, she made her debut in the new club's first league match; a 6–1 defeat by Peamount United.

Budden played in the 2017 FAI Women's Cup final, as Cork beat UCD Waves 1–0 at the Aviva Stadium in November 2017. Her best friend Clare Shine scored the winning goal. She transferred to Galway WFC ahead of the 2020 WNL season, which was delayed and truncated by the COVID-19 pandemic. For 2021 she joined Shelbourne.

At the end of a successful 2022 Women's National League campaign, in which she helped secure a League and Cup double for Shelbourne, Budden was among five players to leave the club for newly-reformed rivals Shamrock Rovers.

== International career ==
In 2010, Budden was a member of the Republic of Ireland U-17 squad who were runners-up in the 2010 UEFA Women's Under-17 Championship and quarter-finalists in the 2010 FIFA U-17 Women's World Cup.

Budden has been capped for the senior Republic of Ireland national team, appearing for the team during the 2019 FIFA Women's World Cup qualifying cycle. In August 2018, with regular goalkeeper Marie Hourihan injured, Ireland coach Colin Bell gave Budden her debut in a 4–0 FIFA Women's World Cup qualifying win over Northern Ireland.

Shortly after making her national team debut, Budden took a year out of football to travel in North America.
