= Aoibheann Clancy =

Irish footballer (born 2003)

Personal information
- Date of birth: 31 October 2003 (age 23)
- Place of birth: Kilbehenny, Limerick,Ireland
- Position: Midfielder

Team information
- Current team: Watford

Youth career
- Kilburn Celtic
- Tipperary Town
- 2018–2019: Limerick WFC

Senior career*
Years	Team	Apps	(Gls)
2020–2024	Wexford Youths	114	(17)
2025–2026	Shelbourne	28	(7)
2026–	Watford	0	(0)

International career^{‡}
2022–	Republic of Ireland	1	(0)
- * Club domestic league appearances and goals as of 11:52, 4 August 2026 (UTC) ‡ National team caps and goals as of 18:28, 10 December 2022 (UTC)

Aoibheann Clancy (born 31 October 2003) is an Irish footballer who plays as a midfielder for Women's Super League 2 side Watford and the Republic of Ireland women's national team.

== Club career ==
Clancy is from Kilbehenny in County Limerick. At youth level, she played ladies' Gaelic football for Galtee Gaels, and Camogie for St. Fanahan's. In youth soccer, she was active in the Tipperary Schoolboys/girls Southern & District League (TSSDL) for both Kilburn Celtic and Tipperary Town, before she joined the youth system of local Women's National League club Limerick WFC.

=== Wexford Youths ===
Ahead of the delayed 2020 Women's National League season, Clancy joined Wexford Youths. In September 2020 she made her first start for her new club as Wexford inflicted a first defeat of the season on champions Peamount United. Impressed Wexford coach Tom Elmes declared Clancy "one of the stand-out performances".

Clancy's strong form continued into the 2021 Women's National League season. She was "instrumental" in the 2021 FAI Women's Cup Final, as Wexford Youths defeated Shelbourne 3–1. At the 2021 WNL Awards, she was named in the Team of the Season and beat fellow nominees Ellen Molloy and Jessie Stapleton to the Young Player of the Year.

=== Watford ===
On 3 August 2026, Clancy was announced at Watford.

== International career ==
=== Youth ===
Clancy represented Ireland at schoolgirl level while she attended Presentation School, Thurles. She was named Player of the Match as Ireland beat England in the final of the 2017 John Read Cup. She was also vice-captain in the team which retained the trophy the following year.

She progressed to the Republic of Ireland women's national under-17 football team, and by 2021 was playing for Dave Connell's Republic of Ireland women's national under-19 football team. She made a single appearance during the calendar year.

=== Senior ===
Clancy's first senior call-up was for a friendly game against Australia on 21 September 2021 at Tallaght Stadium. The national team coach Vera Pauw had been impressed by her good form with her club and in home-based training sessions. Clancy won her first senior cap on 14 November 2022, as a 62nd-minute substitute for Denise O'Sullivan in a 4–0 friendly win over Morocco staged in Marbella, Spain.

=== International appearances ===
Appearances and goals by national team and year
National team	Year	Apps
Republic of Ireland	2022	1
Total		1

== Playing style ==
Clancy is a versatile box-to-box midfielder, whose "quick feet and awareness allow her to operate superbly between the lines".

== Personal life ==
In 2022, Clancy began studying biomedical sciences at University College Dublin.
