= Jessie Stapleton =

Irish footballer (born 2005)

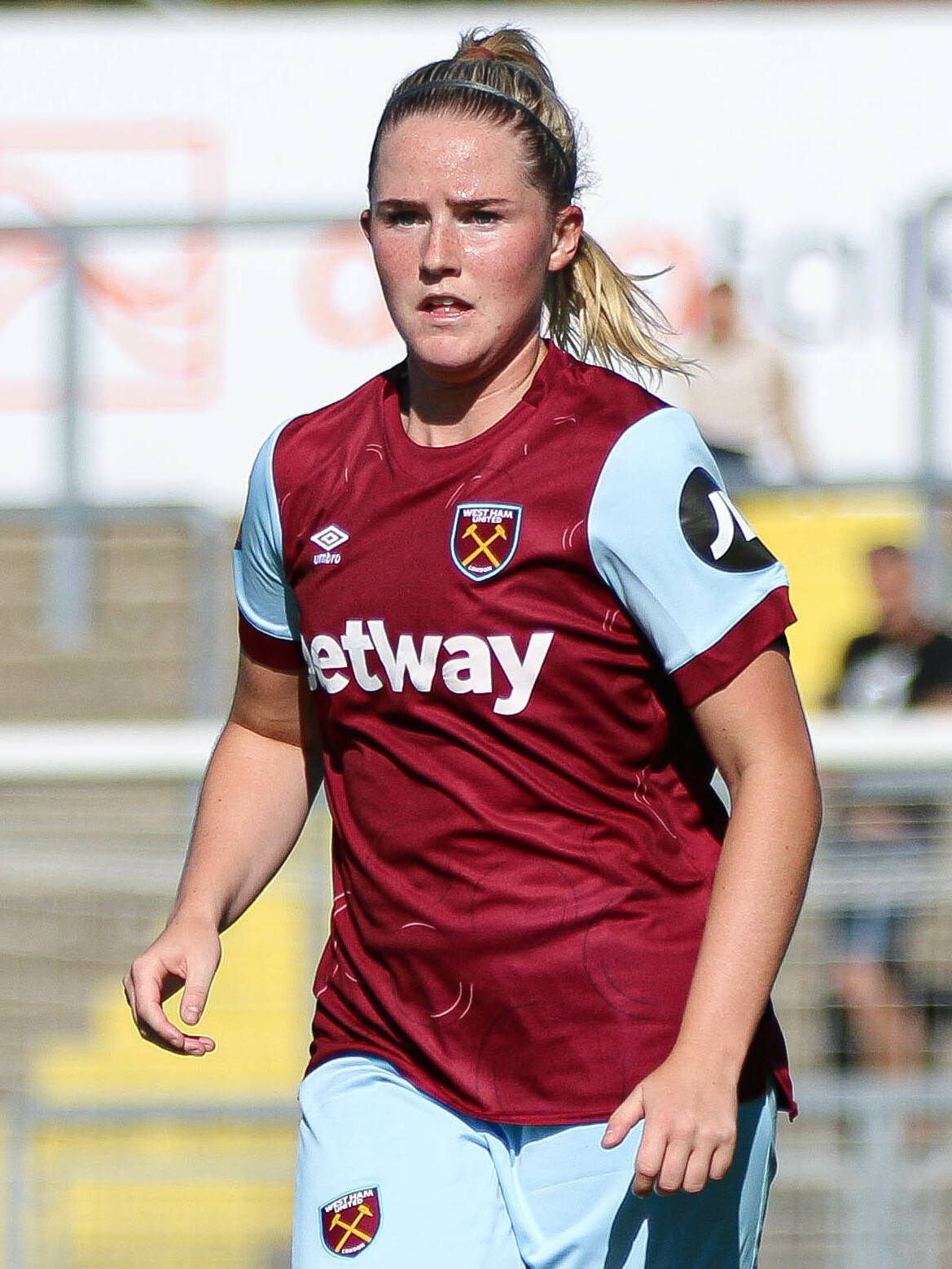
- Stapleton playing for West Ham in 2023

Personal information
- Full name: Jessica Mary Stapleton
- Date of birth: 7 February 2005 (age 21)
- Place of birth: Dublin, Ireland
- Positions: Defender; midfielder

Team information
- Current team: Leicester City
- Number: 22

Youth career
- 2013–2018: Cherry Orchard
- 2019: Peamount United
- 2020: Shamrock Rovers

Senior career*
Years	Team	Apps	(Gls)
2021–2023	Shelbourne		
2023–2026	West Ham United	1	(0)
2024	→ Reading (loan)	11	(1)
2024–2025	→ Sunderland (loan)	15	(2)
2025–2026	→ Nottingham Forest (loan)	15	(1)
2026–	Leicester City	8	(0)

International career^{‡}
2022–	Republic of Ireland	22	(4)
- * Club domestic league appearances and goals as of 15 November 2026 ‡ National team caps and goals as of 13 October 2026

Jessica Mary Stapleton (born 7 February 2005) is an Irish footballer who plays as a defender or midfielder for Women's Super League 2 club Leicester City and the Republic of Ireland national team.

== Club career ==
=== Early career ===
Stapleton is from Ballyfermot, and began playing soccer for Cherry Orchard when she was eight years old. When she was 11 she became the first girl to be selected for the representative team of the Dublin and District Schoolboys League (DDSL). In 2020 Stapleton played for Shamrock Rovers in the Women's Under-17 National League. After Stapleton captained Rovers to their 2–0 League final defeat by Cork City, she spoke out against sexist remarks made by internet trolls on the comment section of the live feed.

=== Shelbourne ===
Stapleton joined Women's National League club Shelbourne for the 2021 season, since Shamrock Rovers lacked a senior women's team. Manchester City had a longstanding interest in signing Stapleton, but regulations arising out of Brexit prevented British clubs from signing any Irish players until they turned 18 years old.

She enjoyed good form in her debut season at senior level, featuring in defence and midfield for Noel King's Shelbourne. Stapleton sometimes played in attack, helping King plug gaps in the Shelbourne team caused by injuries and the departure of several players to professional clubs in the United Kingdom. She was named WNL Player of the Month for October 2021, nominated for Young Player of the Year and named in the Team of the Season. Shelbourne overhauled Peamount United on a dramatic final day to win the 2021 Women's National League title. Stapleton also played in the 2021 FAI Women's Cup Final, but Shelbourne were beaten 3–1 by Wexford Youths.

In 2022 Stapleton continued to play well as Shelbourne claimed a League and Cup "double". She was named Young Player of the Year and retained her place in the Team of the Season. In the 2022 FAI Women's Cup Final Stapleton scored the opening goal and was Player of the Match as Shelbourne beat Athlone Town 2–0 to avenge their defeat in the previous year's final. In November 2022 she was reported to have made an agreement to join West Ham United in June 2023, in preference to several other interested clubs.

==== West Ham ====
On 28 July 2023, Stapleton was announced at West Ham. She made her league debut against Leicester City on 17 December 2023.

==== Reading (loan) ====
On 26 January 2024, Reading announced the signing of Stapleton on loan from West Ham United for the remainder of the season. She helped the club avoid relegation from the Championship by scoring in a 1-0 victory against Durham on 21 April 2024

==== Sunderland (loan) ====
On 1 August 2024, Stapleton was announced at Sunderland.

==== Leicester City ====
On 29 July 2026, Stapleton signed a three year deal with Leicester City.

== International career ==
=== Youth ===
Stapleton represented Ireland at schoolgirl level while she attended Pobalscoil Iosolde. On her full debut for the national under-15 schoolgirl team on 17 February 2018, she scored a goal and was player of the match in a 2–1 win over Northern Ireland.

She progressed to the Republic of Ireland women's national under-17 football team and debuted against Iceland in February 2020. By 2021 Stapleton was playing for Dave Connell's Republic of Ireland women's national under-19 football team. She made six appearances throughout the year, scoring one goal. At the FAI International Football Awards she was named 2022 Under-19 Women's International Player of the Year.

=== Senior ===
Senior Republic of Ireland coach Colin Bell called 13-year-old Stapleton into a training camp for home-based national team players in August 2018. She was called up to the senior Republic of Ireland squad for the first time in November 2021, for 2023 FIFA Women's World Cup qualification – UEFA Group A fixtures against Slovakia and Georgia.

Stapleton won her first senior cap on 19 June 2022, as a half-time substitute in a 1–0 friendly win over the Philippines in Antalya, Turkey. Although she had been playing in midfield for her club, national team coach Vera Pauw saw Stapleton as a central defender.

Appearances and goals by national team and year
National team	Year	Apps	Goals
Republic of Ireland	2022	1	0
Republic of Ireland	2023	1	0
Republic of Ireland	2024	9	1
Republic of Ireland	2025	9	1
Republic of Ireland	2026	2	2
Total		22	4

=== International goals ===
No.	Date	Venue	Opponent	Score	Result	Competition
1.	25 October 2024	Mikheil Meskhi Stadium, Tbilisi, Georgia	Georgia	4–0	6–0	UEFA Euro 2025 qualifying play-offs
2.	8 April 2025	Theodoros Vardinogiannis Stadium, Heraklion, Greece	Greece	3–0	4–0	2025 UEFA Nations League
3.	9 October 2026	Astana Arena, Astana, Kazakhstan	Kazakhstan	8–0	8–0	2027 World Cup qualification UEFA play-offs
4.	13 October 2026	Páirc Uí Chaoimh, Cork, Ireland	Kazakhstan	1–0	4–0	2027 World Cup qualification UEFA play-offs

== Honours ==
Shelbourne

- Women's National League: 2021 2022
- FAI Women's Cup: 2022

Individual

- WNL Player of the Month: October 2021
- WNL Team of the Year: 2021 2022
- WNL Young Player of the Year: 2022
- FAI Young International Women's Player of the Year: 2025
