= Noelle Murray =

Irish footballer

Personal information
- Full name: Noelle Murray
- Date of birth: 25 December 1989 (age 36)
- Place of birth: Ireland,
- Position: Forward

Team information
- Current team: Athlone Town
- Number: 10

Senior career*
Years	Team	Apps	(Gls)
- Raheny United
2011	St Catherine's		
2011–2012	Shamrock Rovers		
2012–2015	Raheny United		
2015–2017	Shelbourne		
2017	Glasgow City		
2018–2026	Shelbourne		(114)
2026–	Athlone Town	5	(0)

International career
2007–	Republic of Ireland	11	
- * Club domestic league appearances and goals

Noelle Murray (born 25 December 1989) is an Irish professional footballer who plays as a forward for Irish club Athlone Town and capped by the Republic of Ireland national team. Between 2011 and 2016 Murray played in six successive FAI Women's Cup finals with three clubs - St Catherine's, Raheny United and Shelbourne Ladies.

== Club career ==
=== Early career ===
On 14 October 2007 at Dalymount Park, together with Niamh Reid Burke and Olivia O'Toole, Murray was a member of the Raheny United team that lost 1–0 to the Galway Ladies League in the FAI Women's Cup final. Murray scored twice for St Catherine's in the 2011 FAI Women's Cup final played at Turners Cross. St Catherine's claimed the cup with a dramatic 3–1 victory over Wilton United. Mary Waldron scored the opening goal in the 43rd minute before Murray doubled the score in the 77th minute with an astonishing volley. However, Wilton hit back in the closing moments of the game through Denise O'Sullivan but their late comeback was short lived as Murray ended the contest with another impressive strike in the 89th minute. Together with Nicola Sinnott, Murray was a member of Shamrock Rovers squad during the inaugural 2011–12 Women's National League season.

=== Raheny United ===
The 2012–13 season saw Murray return to Raheny United. Over the next three seasons, together with Niamh Reid Burke, Siobhán Killeen, Clare Shine and Katie McCabe, Murray was a prominent member of the successful United team that won two Women's National League titles and three FAI Women's Cup finals. In the 2012 final United clinched the cup with a 90th-minute winner from Murray. Murray also scored three goals for Raheny United in their 2013–14 and 2014–15 UEFA Women's Champions League campaigns.

=== Shelbourne Ladies ===
During the 2015–16 season Murray played for Shelbourne Ladies, helping them finish as runners-up in the FAI Women's Cup, the WNL Shield and the Women's National League. Murray's goals also helped Shelbourne Ladies win the WNL Cup. In the semi-final she scored a hat-trick in a 4–2 win over Wexford Youths. In the final she scored twice in a 3–2 win over UCD Waves at Richmond Park. In the 2016 FAI Women's Cup, Murray scored again as she helped Shelbourne to a 5–0 win over Wexford Youths.

=== Glasgow City ===
Murray left Shelbourne in January 2017, signing her first professional contract with Scottish Women's Premier League champions Glasgow City.

=== Shelbourne Ladies ===
In March 2018, Noelle re-joined Shelbourne Ladies. After 100+ Shelbourne goals she departed the club in December 2025

=== Athlone Town ===
She joined Athlone Town at the start of the 2026 Season

== International career ==
Murray has represented the Republic of Ireland at under 17, under 19 and senior level. In a UEFA Women's Under-19 Championship qualifier on 26 April 2008, Murray came on as a substitute for Julie-Ann Russell in the 72nd minute against Serbia and scored twice in a 7–0 win. Murray made her senior international debut on 9 March 2007 when she came on as a substitute in a 2007 Algarve Cup game against Iceland. She also played against Portugal and Italy in the same tournament. Murray was also a member of the Republic of Ireland squads for the 2008 Algarve Cup, the UEFA Women's Euro 2009 qualifying campaign and the 2013 Cyprus Cup.

== Honours ==
Raheny United

- Women's National League: 2012–13, 2013–14
- FAI Women's Cup: 2012, 2013, 2014
  - Runners-up: 2007
- WNL Cup: 2015

Shelbourne

- Women's National League: 2021, 2022
- FAI Women's Cup: 2016, 2022, 2024
  - Runners-up: 2015, 2021, 2023
- WNL Cup: 2016

St Catherine's

- FAI Women's Cup: 2011

Glasgow City

- Scottish Women's Premier League: 2017
