= 2022 Women's National League (Ireland) =

Women's National League
- Season: 2022
- Dates: 5 March 2022 – 29 October 2022
- Champions: Shelbourne; 3rd title
- Matches: 135
- Goals: 457 (3.39 per match)
- Top goalscorer: Áine O'Gorman (22 goals)
- Biggest home win: Peamount United 8–1 Cork City (23 April 2022)
- Biggest away win: Treaty United 0–10 Shelbourne (2 July 2022)
- Highest scoring: Treaty United 0–10 Shelbourne (2 July 2022)

The 2022 Women's National League known as the SSE Airtricity WNL for sponsorship reasons, was the 12th season of the Women's National League, the highest women's association football league in the Republic of Ireland since its establishment in 2011. Expansion team Sligo Rovers competed for the first time, bringing the league up to ten clubs. Shelbourne, as defending champions from the previous season, won the 2022 league by defeating Wexford Youths on the final day of the season.

In July 2022 Shelbourne announced the signing of highly-decorated United States international player Heather O'Reilly, who emerged from retirement after two years. The transfer brought substantial publicity and increased the profile of the league.

== Teams ==
Locations of Women's National League teams
Locations of Dublin Women's National League teams

Team	Home town/suburb	Stadium	2021 finish
Athlone Town	Athlone	Athlone Town Stadium	7th
Bohemians	Dublin (Phibsborough)	Dalymount Park	6th
Cork City	Cork	Turners Cross	8th
DLR Waves	Dún Laoghaire	UCD Bowl	4th
Galway	Galway	Eamonn Deacy Park	5th
Peamount United	Newcastle, County Dublin	Greenogue	2nd
Shelbourne	Dublin (Drumcondra)	Tolka Park	1st
Sligo Rovers	Sligo	The Showgrounds	NA
Treaty United	Limerick	Markets Field	9th
Wexford Youths	Crossabeg	Ferrycarrig Park	3rd

=== Personnel and kits ===
Note: Flags indicate national team as has been defined under FIFA eligibility rules. Players may hold more than one non-FIFA nationality.

Team	Manager	Captain	Kit manufacturer	Shirt sponsor
Athlone Town	(Republic of Ireland) Tommy Hewitt	(Republic of Ireland) Laurie Ryan	Umbro	Palfinger
Bohemians	(Republic of Ireland) Sean Byrne	(Republic of Ireland) Sinéad Taylor	O'Neills	Premier Property Group
Cork City	(Republic of Ireland) Paul Farrell	(Republic of Ireland) Becky Cassin	Adidas	Jackie Lennox Chip Shop
DLR Waves	(Republic of Ireland) Graham Kelly	(Republic of Ireland) Jessica Gleeson	Jako	CDS - Clare Distribution Services
Galway	(Republic of Ireland) Alan Murphy	(Republic of Ireland) Savannah McCarthy	Acerbis	Só Hotels
Peamount United	(Republic of Ireland) James O'Callaghan	(Republic of Ireland) Áine O'Gorman	O'Neills	SPAR Kelly's Newcastle
Shelbourne	(Republic of Ireland) Noel King	(Republic of Ireland) Pearl Slattery	Umbro	Technological University Dublin
Sligo Rovers	(Republic of Ireland) Steve Feeney	(Republic of Ireland) Emma Hansberry	Joma	Avant Money
Treaty United	(Republic of Ireland) Don O'Riordan	(United States) Michaela Mitchell	Umbro	None
Wexford Youths	(Republic of Ireland) Stephen Quinn	(Republic of Ireland) Kylie Murphy	Jako	Energia

=== Managerial changes ===
Team	Outgoing manager	Manner of departure	Date of vacancy	Position in table	Incoming manager	Date of appointment
Galway	(Republic of Ireland) Stephen Lally	Redeployed	12 December 2021	Pre-season	(Republic of Ireland) Alan Murphy	12 December 2021
Sligo Rovers				Pre-season	(Republic of Ireland) Steve Feeney	15 December 2021
Treaty United				Pre-season	(Republic of Ireland) Don O'Riordan	29 December 2021
Cork City	(Republic of Ireland) Paul Farrell	Resignation	9 May 2022	9th	(Republic of Ireland) Jess Lawton (interim)	10 May 2022
Cork City	(Republic of Ireland) Jess Lawton (interim)	End of interim period	31 May 2022	9th	(Republic of Ireland) Danny Murphy	31 May 2022
Treaty United	(Republic of Ireland) Don O'Riordan	Resignation	7 November 2022	10th		

== Format ==
The ten teams played each other three times, with a mid-season break from 12 June to 1 July 2022.

== League table ==
=== Standings ===
Pos	Team	Pld	W	D	L	GF	GA	GD	Pts	Qualification or relegation
1	Shelbourne	27	19	3	5	66	13	+53	60	Qualification for the UEFA Women's Champions League
2	Athlone Town	27	18	4	5	53	24	+29	58	
3	Peamount United	27	17	5	5	80	26	+54	56	
4	Wexford Youths	27	17	5	5	61	33	+28	56	
5	DLR Waves	27	11	7	9	51	30	+21	40	
6	Galway	27	11	6	10	48	38	+10	39	
7	Bohemians	27	10	6	11	36	35	+1	36	
8	Sligo Rovers	27	6	2	19	32	66	−34	20	
9	Cork City	27	6	0	21	25	82	−57	18	
10	Treaty United	27	0	2	25	5	110	−105	2	

Updated to match(es) played on 30 October 2022. Source: FAI Women’s National League, Soccerway, Extratime.com

=== Positions by round ===
The table lists the positions of teams after each week of matches. In order to preserve chronological evolvements, any postponed matches are not included to the round at which they were originally scheduled, but added to the full round they were played immediately afterwards.

Team ╲ Round	1	2	3	4	5	6	7	8	9	10	11	12	13	14	15	16	17	18	19	20	21	22	23	24	25	26	27
Athlone Town	6	6	7	5	7	8	5	5	4	4	3	3	3	4	3	2	3	3	3	3	3	4	4	4	4	3	2
Bohemians	7	7	8	6	8	7	9	8	7	7	8	7	8	8	7	7	7	7	7	7	7	7	6	7	7	7	7
Cork City	8	8	9	9	9	9	8	9	9	9	9	9	9	9	9	9	9	9	9	9	9	9	9	9	9	9	9
DLR Waves	2	2	2	4	4	5	4	4	5	5	6	6	6	6	6	6	6	6	6	6	6	6	7	6	6	6	5
Galway	3	3	5	7	5	6	6	6	6	6	5	4	5	5	5	5	5	5	5	5	5	5	5	5	5	5	6
Peamount United	1	1	1	1	1	1	1	2	2	3	4	5	4	3	4	4	4	4	4	4	4	3	3	3	3	4	3
Shelbourne	5	5	3	2	2	2	2	1	1	1	1	1	1	1	1	1	1	1	1	1	1	2	2	2	2	1	1
Sligo Rovers	10	10	6	8	6	4	7	7	8	8	7	8	7	7	8	8	8	8	8	8	8	8	8	8	8	8	8
Treaty United	9	9	10	10	10	10	10	10	10	10	10	10	10	10	10	10	10	10	10	10	10	10	10	10	10	10	10
Wexford Youths	4	4	4	3	3	3	3	3	3	2	2	2	2	2	2	3	2	2	2	2	2	1	1	1	1	2	4

Source: Extratime.com, Soccerway.com
= Leader and UEFA Women's Champions League; = Second; = Third

== Results ==
=== Matches 1–24 ===
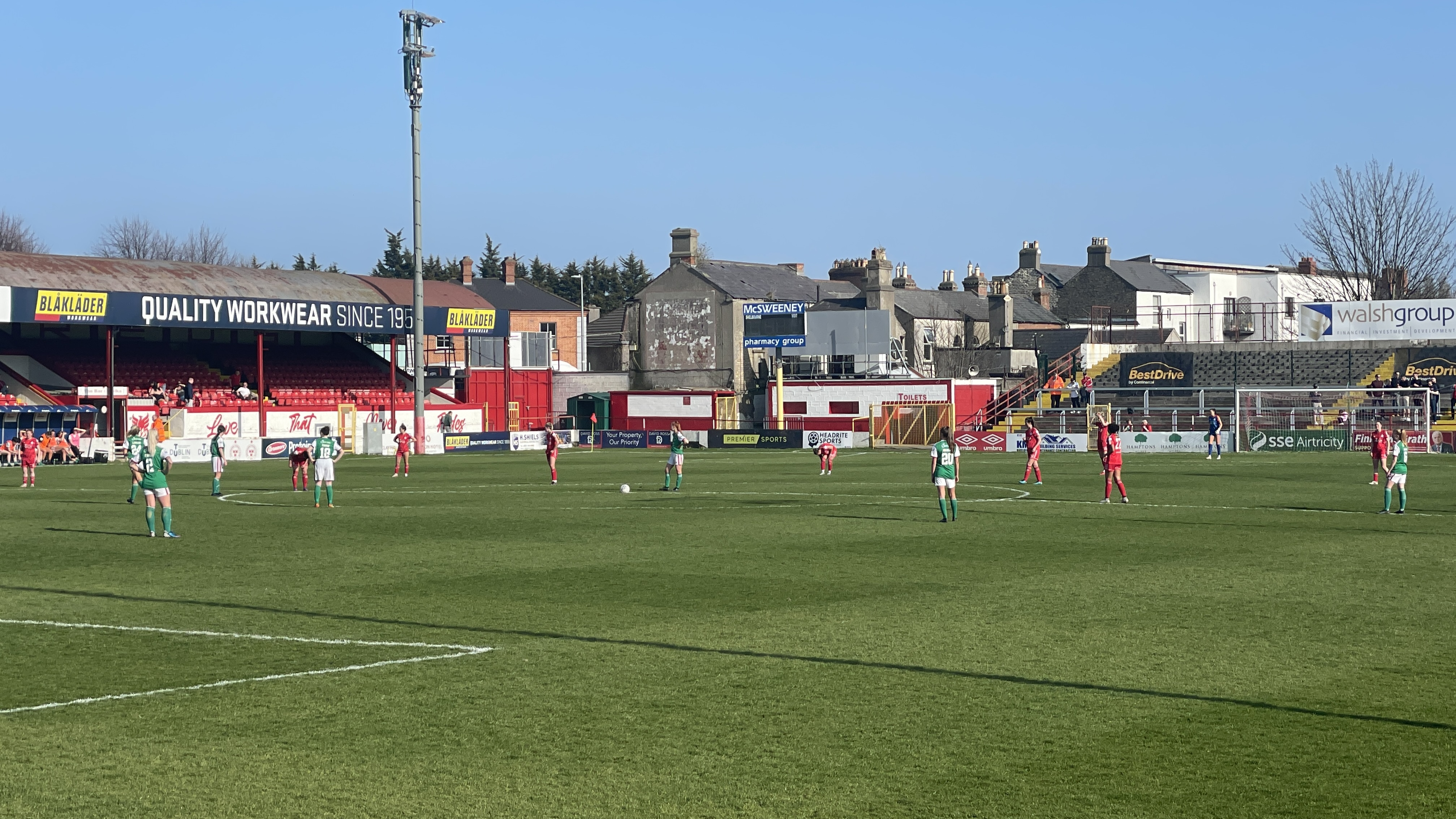
Shelbourne playing Cork City at Tolka Park

Teams play each other twice.

Home \ Away	ATH	BOH	COR	DLR	GAL	PEA	SHE	SLI	TRE	WEX
Athlone Town	—	2–1	1–0	2–1	3–1	1–2	0–2	5–0	4–1	1–2
Bohemians	1–1	—	3–1	0–0	0–3	2–1	0–3	2–1	3–0	0–3
Cork City	1–4	2–1	—	0–3	0–3	0–7	0–4	1–2	2–1	1–2
DLR Waves	0–1	0–0	6–0	—	0–1	1–1	1–0	3–2	5–0	0–0
Galway	0–0	1–1	5–1	1–1	—	0–4	0–2	5–2	3–0	2–2
Peamount United	0–1	1–1	8–1	3–2	2–1	—	0–4	0–3 (Note: The Football Association of Ireland awarded a 3–0 win to Sligo Rovers after Peamount United fielded an unregistered player. The original score was 6–0 to Peamount United.)	5–1	4–0
Shelbourne	1–1	1–0	7–0	4–0	1–1	1–0	—	1–0	5–0	0–1
Sligo Rovers	1–2	1–3	2–0	0–3	1–2	0–5	3–2	—	3–1	1–0
Treaty United	0–2	0–4	0–4	0–4	0–2	0–7	0–10	0–0	—	0–3
Wexford	2–1	3–1	5–1	2–0	1–1	3–3	0–2	2–0	3–1	—

Source: Extratime.com
Legend: Blue = home team win; Yellow = draw; Red = away team win.

=== Matches 19–27 ===
Teams play each other once.

Home \ Away	ATH	BOH	COR	DLR	GAL	PEA	SHE	SLI	TRE	WEX
Athlone Town	—	—	—	—	1–0	0–2	2–0	4–2	—	2–1
Bohemians	1–2	—	—	2–1	1–2	—	—	—	—	2–5
Cork City	1–2	0–1	—	—	1–0	0–5	—	3–2	—	—
DLR Waves	1–1	—	1–0	—	—	1–1	1–2	—	7–0	—
Galway	—	—	—	2–3	—	0–6	1–2	—	—	0–1
Peamount United	—	1–0	—	—	—	—	—	2–0	6–0	3–3
Shelbourne	—	0–0	2–1	—	—	0–1	—	2–0	4–0	—
Sligo Rovers	—	0–2	—	1–5	2–5	—	—	—	1–1	—
Treaty United	0–7	0–4	0–3	—	0–6	—	—	—	—	—
Wexford	—	—	5–1	4–1	—	—	0–4	5–2	3–0	—

Source: Extratime.com
Legend: Blue = home team win; Yellow = draw; Red = away team win.

== Statistics ==
=== Top scorers ===
As of 30 October 2022.

Rank	Player	Club	Goals
1	(Republic of Ireland) Áine O'Gorman	Peamount United	22
2	(Republic of Ireland) Emily Corbet	Athlone Town	20
3	(Republic of Ireland) Stephanie Roche	Peamount United	16
4	(Republic of Ireland) Ellen Molloy	Wexford Youths	16
5	(Republic of Ireland) Kylie Murphy	Wexford Youths	15

Source: Women's National League

== Awards ==
=== Monthly awards ===
Month	Player of the Month		References
Month	Player	Club	References
March	Stephanie Roche	Peamount United	
April	Laurie Ryan	Athlone Town	
May	Jessica Ziu	Shelbourne	
June/July	Emma Doherty	Sligo Rovers	
August/September	Ciara Rossiter	Wexford Youths	
October	Alex Kavanagh	Shelbourne	

=== Annual awards ===
Award	Winner	Club
WNL Player of the Year	Emily Corbet	Athlone Town
Young Player of the Year	Jessie Stapleton	Shelbourne
Manager of the Year	Tommy Hewitt	Athlone Town
Bank of Ireland Golden Gloves	Amanda Budden	Shelbourne
Buy4Pets Online Goal of the Year	Aoife Brennan	Sligo Rovers
Services to the Women's National League	Stephen Moran and Mick O'Shea	

WNL Team of the Year
Goalkeeper	Rachael Kelly (Bohemians)				
Defenders	Jessica Gargan (Shelbourne)		Jessica Hennessy (Athlone Town)		Shauna Fox (Shelbourne)
Midfielders	Áine O'Gorman (Peamount United)	Ellen Molloy (Wexford Youths)	Muireann Devaney (Athlone Town)	Jessie Stapleton (Shelbourne)	Ciara Rossiter (Wexford Youths)
Forwards	Emma Doherty (Sligo Rovers)			Emily Corbet (Athlone Town)	

== Broadcasting ==
In February 2021 the Football Association of Ireland announced that all WNL matches would be streamed free of charge on the new LOITV platform. In February 2022 the TG4 Irish language television network confirmed an intention to broadcast nine WNL matches in 2022. Ultimately 10 games were broadcast live, which attracted over 500,000 viewers.

== See also ==
- 2022 FAI Women's Cup
