= Laurie Ryan (footballer, born 1993) =

Irish association footballer and Gaelic footballer

Personal information
- Full name: Laurie Ryan
- Date of birth: October 27, 1993 (age 33)
- Place of birth: Ennis, County Clare, Ireland
- Position: Defensive midfielder

Team information
- Current team: Treaty United (manager)

Youth career
- Lifford Ladies

Senior career*
Years	Team	Apps	(Gls)
2021–2024	Athlone Town		

Managerial career
- 2026–: Treaty United
- * Club domestic league appearances and goals as of 18:01, 3 November 2026 (UTC)

Laurie Ryan (born 27 October 1993) is an Irish association football manager and former player, as well as a former inter-county Gaelic footballer for Clare. She is the head coach of Women's Premier Division club Treaty United.

== Playing career ==
A native of Ennis, County Clare, Ryan played youth soccer with Lifford Ladies and represented Clare in ladies' Gaelic football, captaining the county side. She also lined out for club side Banner Ladies. Following a severe concussion sustained during a club GAA match in May 2019, she suffered from prolonged symptoms and ultimately decided to take a break from inter-county Gaelic football.

After relocating to Athlone to work as an assistant lecturer in science at the Technological University of the Shannon (TUS), a chance encounter with then-manager Tommy Hewitt—who was working his day job as a postman and hand-delivered a pair of newly ordered football boots to her door—persuaded her to return to association football. She joined Athlone Town ahead of the 2021 season and was named club captain, leading them to the 2022 FAI Women's Cup final, the 2023 FAI Women's Cup title, and their first-ever Women's Premier Division league title in 2024. She was named the league's Player of the Month for April 2022. She stepped away from playing before the 2025 season following the birth of her son, returning briefly to local club Banner Ladies to win the 2025 Clare Senior Ladies Football Championship.

== Coaching and academic career ==
Alongside her playing career, Ryan guided the TUS women's soccer team to the Intervarsities Shield (2023) and Cup (2024). In October 2025, she was appointed head coach of Treaty United ahead of the 2026 season, and was retained for the 2027 campaign. She is also a PhD candidate in Science Education and Public Engagement at the University of Limerick.
