= Fran Rooney =

Irish businessman (1956–2024)

CEO of the Football Association of Ireland
- In office 1 May 2003 – 3 November 2004
- Preceded by: Brendan Menton
- Succeeded by: John Delaney

Manager of the Republic of Ireland women's national football team
- In office April 1986 – 1991
- Preceded by: Eamonn Darcy (footballer)
- Succeeded by: Linda Gorman

Personal details
- Born: 2 December 1956 Ringsend, Dublin, Ireland
- Died: 20 May 2024 (aged 67) Dublin, Ireland
- Spouse: Mary (divorced)
- Children: 3
- Occupation: Businessman, sports executive, barrister-at-law

Fran Rooney (2 December 1956 – 20 May 2024) was an Irish businessman, sports executive and barrister-at-law. He had a football background and was the CEO of the Football Association of Ireland from 2003 to 2004. He was also a chartered accountant and fellow of the Institute of Chartered Accountants in Ireland.

As the CEO of Baltimore Technologies, Rooney took the company from a small operation to a global enterprise with a market capitalisation of $13.6 billion that was twice named Ireland's company of the year. Rooney was also presented with the 2000 Businessman of the Year by the President of Ireland and 2001 Entrepreneur of the Year by the Bank of Ireland. Rooney was the subject of considerable media interest both in Europe and the US following his involvement with Baltimore Technologies and was the subject of an RTÉ documentary in the Raging Bulls series.

== Early life ==
Rooney was born to John and Dolores in Ringsend on 2 December 1956. He took his Leaving Cert at CBS Westland Row. Rooney played football with Home Farm, Shamrock Rovers, St Patrick's Athletic and Bohemians. He subsequently became a member of the Institute of Chartered Accountants in Ireland, Institute of Internal Auditors and Irish Computer Society.

Early in his career; he was the General Manager of National Irish Bank from 1990 to 1993, the Managing Director of Meridian from 1993 to 1994 and the CEO of Quay Financial Software from 1994 to 1996.

== Baltimore Technologies ==
Michael Purser founded Baltimore Technologies in the 1970s. In 1996, it was acquired by a team funded by Dermot Desmond and led by Fran Rooney. As CEO, Rooney developed Baltimore Technologies into a global data security company. He developed products, marketed the company and listed on the NASDAQ and London Stock Exchange with a market capitalization of €13.6 billion, 1,400 employees and offices in 23 cities worldwide.

In 1998, Bill Clinton and Bertie Ahern signed an Electronic Commerce deal using Baltimore's technology. Under Rooney's leadership, Baltimore underwent several successful mergers, became a member of the FTSE 100, and was also successfully listed on the NASDAQ. Baltimore Technologies was Company of the Year in 1998 and 2000. In 2000, Rooney was awarded Businessman of the Year and was presented with his award by the President of Ireland, Mary McAleese. He was the Bank of Ireland Entrepreneur of the Year in 2001.

== Football career ==
Rooney was the chief executive officer of the Football Association of Ireland from 1 May 2003 to 3 November 2004.

Rooney became CEO to bring about change in the running of football. Previously, he had an active career as a footballer, playing for Shamrock Rovers, Home Farm and St Patrick's Athletic and coaching football and Gaelic Football teams. He had been a football manager, managing several teams and took on the role of the Republic of Ireland women's national team manager from April 1986 to 1991.

== Post-Football Association of Ireland career ==
After his role at the FAI; Rooney was the Executive Chairman of Vimio from 2004 to 2005, Ice Broadband from 2004 to 2008 and Mingo since 2017.

== Personal life and death ==
Rooney was married to Mary and had 3 children, along with 2 grandchildren. The couple later divorced and he had a partner named Jackie. He resided in Castleknock.

Rooney died of cancer in Dublin, on 20 May 2024, aged 67. His cremation took place on 24 May in Ballymount after a funeral in Castleknock.

== Awards and honours ==
- Businessman of the Year 2001
- Entrepreneur of the Year 2001
- Fellow of the Institute of Chartered Accountants in Ireland
- Fellow of the Irish Computer Society
- Fellow of the Institute of Internal Auditors

== Education ==
- Honourable Society of Kings Inns
- Bachelor of Law Degree 2008
- Diploma in Legal Studies 2004–2007
- Degree in Administrative Science
