= Linda Gorman =

Irish footballer and coach

Personal information
- Date of birth: 17 November 1953 (age 72)
- Place of birth: Dublin, Ireland
- Position: Defender

Senior career*
Years	Team	Apps	(Gls)
- Civil Defence
- Avengers
- Suffragettes
- Tolka Rovers
- Belvedere
- Elm Rovers

International career
1973–1985	Ireland		

Managerial career
- 1991–1992: Ireland
- * Club domestic league appearances and goals

Linda Gorman (born 17 November 1953) is an Irish football coach and former player, who managed the Republic of Ireland women's national football team from 1991 until 1992.

As a player she was a tenacious full-back. After watching Ireland's 1–0 1987 European Competition for Women's Football qualifying win over Northern Ireland at Glenmalure Park on 5 May 1985, Con Houlihan praised Gorman in his Evening Press column:

The veteran now is a girl who looks like she should still be at school. I first saw her play about eight years ago – against Wales at Tolka Park. She was brilliant that day – and in the meantime has collected twenty-five caps. Her name is Linda Gorman – yesterday she was captain and left back. She is a small girl – but she would put manners on Norman Whiteside.

Gorman grew up in Ballygall. She represented several Dublin teams at club level, and made her debut as a player for Ireland in 1973. She won over 20 caps and from retired from international football as captain and Ireland's record cap holder in 1985.

In 1991 she succeeded Fran Rooney to become the first female head coach of the senior Republic of Ireland women's national football team. She left the position a year later, unhappy at poor standards at the Ladies Football Association of Ireland (LFAI) and was replaced by Mick Cooke.

Liam Tuohy approached Gorman to start a women and girls' section at Home Farm. She later moved into coaching the club's boys' teams with great success. In November 2022 Gorman was inducted to the Football Association of Ireland Hall of Fame.
