= Saoirse Noonan =

Irish footballer (born 1999)

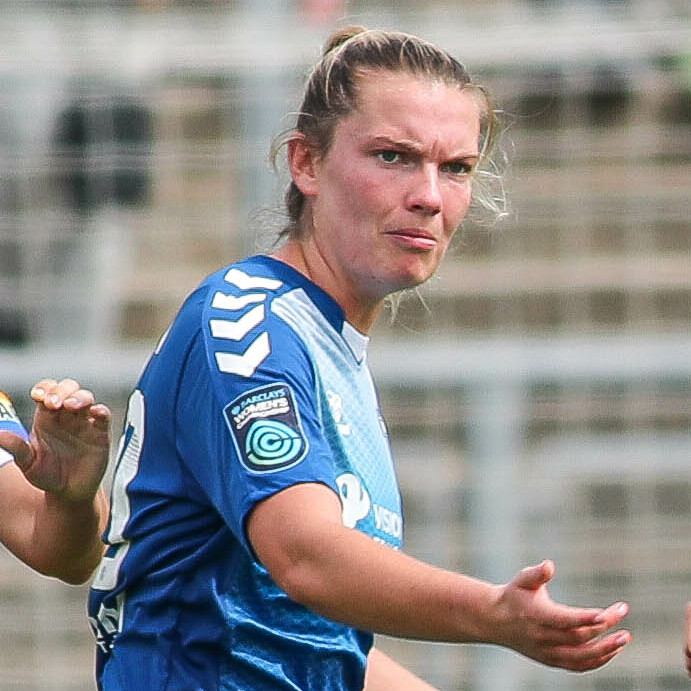
- in 2023

Personal information
- Full name: Saoirse Noonan
- Date of birth: 13 July 1999 (age 27)
- Place of birth: Cork, Ireland
- Height: 1.70 m (5 ft 7 in)
- Positions: Midfielder; forward

Youth career
- Kilreen Celtic
- Douglas Hall AFC

Senior career*
Years	Team	Apps	(Gls)
2015–2021	Cork City	69	(42)
2021	Shelbourne	22	(12)
2022–2024	Durham	42	(7)
2022	→ Shelbourne (loan)	11	(7)
2024–2026	Celtic	52	(43)

International career^{‡}
2016–2018	Republic of Ireland U19	20	(7)
2016–	Republic of Ireland	12	(2)
- * Club domestic league appearances and goals as of 4 May 2026 ‡ National team caps and goals as of 4 May 2026

Saoirse Noonan (/ˈsɪərʃə ˈnuːnən/ SEER-shə; born 13 July 1999) is an Irish dual code footballer who plays for Watford and the Republic of Ireland national team.

From 2018 until 2020 she also played ladies' Gaelic football at senior level for the Cork county ladies' football team, competing in the Ladies' National Football League and All-Ireland Senior Ladies' Football Championship.

As a soccer player Noonan is a forward or playmaking midfielder. She played for her home town club Cork City from joining them at 16 years old until moving to Shelbourne in 2021. In 2017 she was named Women's National League (WNL) Young Player of the Year and helped Cork City win their first major trophy, defeating UCD Waves 1–0 in the FAI Women's Cup final at the Aviva Stadium. Although her appearances were sometimes restricted by her Gaelic football commitments, she became Cork City's all-time record goal scorer. Noonan is a former Republic of Ireland youth national team captain and was named under-17 International Player of the Year in 2016. She won her first senior cap in August 2016 and was recalled to the senior squad in November 2020.

In Gaelic football Noonan has a long association with the Nemo Rangers club and she won All-Ireland medals with Cork at under-14, under-16, and minor level. As a prolific full-forward she debuted with the senior Cork team in June 2018 and quickly earned a reputation as a high-scoring "super sub". Ahead of her appearance in Cork's 2018 All-Ireland Senior Ladies' Football Championship final defeat by Dublin at Croke Park, Cork coach Ephie Fitzgerald said of Noonan: "I firmly believe that Saoirse could be the face of ladies football for the next 10 years".

Noonan has attracted notice for her unusual success in balancing the demands of two sports at the elite level. In November 2020 the Republic of Ireland soccer manager Vera Pauw said of Noonan: "Playing two sports and just being so natural and so clinical about it is amazing". In 2021 Noonan decided to pause her Gaelic football career again to focus on soccer.

== Association football ==
=== Club career ===
Noonan is from the Grange area of Cork and began playing soccer on the boys' teams which her older brother Eóin played on. She was initially unhappy to be banned from boys' soccer but later enjoyed playing for Douglas Hall's female teams. As a young player Noonan's idol was her future Cork City teammate Clare Shine.

Noonan joined Cork City and made her first Women's National League (WNL) appearances in the 2015–16 season. In a promising debut campaign, she showed "flashes of brilliance" and won the WNL Player of the Month award for November/December 2015. In 2017 Noonan was named the WNL Young Player of the Season, and helped rapidly-improving Cork City win their first major trophy by beating UCD Waves 1–0 in the final of the FAI Women's Cup at the Aviva Stadium.

In 2018, Noonan missed her kick as Cork City lost the final of the WNL Shield to Wexford Youths on a penalty shootout. Noonan's schedule became "beyond hectic" in 2018. In addition to playing and training with Cork City, she sat her Leaving Certificate exams, started playing for Cork's senior inter county Gaelic football team, and began writing a weekly column on The42.ie website. She was unhappy to be dropped for one Cork City match during this period but was restored to the team for their next fixture, in which she scored. In the final match of the league season against Peamount United, she suffered a partially torn anterior cruciate ligament which did not require surgery but ruled her out for around five months.

By 2019 Noonan was perceived as one of the most talented players in the WNL. Cork City finished fifth of eight teams to equal their best performance, but Noonan – the club's all-time record goal scorer – was sometimes unavailable due to her Gaelic football commitments. The start of the 2020 season was delayed until August by the COVID-19 pandemic in the Republic of Ireland. Noonan used the time off to set up a one-to-one coaching business and to work hard at improving her own fitness. She started the season in good form and was praised by Cork City's coach Ronan Collins after she won the September 2020 Player of the Month award: "Saoirse has loads of ability and talent, but sometimes we forget how young she is as she only turned 21 recently. During lockdown she put a lot of effort into herself and that is bearing fruits now."

On 8 November 2020 Noonan's name was trending on Twitter in Ireland, after she scored both goals in Cork City's 2–0 FAI Women's Cup semi-final win over Treaty United, one day after she scored the decisive goal in Cork gaelic footballers' 1–14 to 0–14 win over Kerry. The following month she played in the 2020 FAI Women's Cup Final, which Cork lost 6–0 to Peamount United. Noonan's continued good form made her a transfer target for professional foreign clubs including Víkingur FC, Aston Villa and London City Lionesses.

==== Shelbourne ====
On 11 February 2021 Noonan joined Shelbourne. In doing so she decided to pause her Gaelic football career again to focus on soccer, signing for a club in Dublin to make a clean break. Noonan was Shels' top scorer with 12 goals as the club won the 2021 WNL title on the last day of the season. She also played in the 2021 FAI Women's Cup Final, but Shelbourne were beaten 3–1 by Wexford Youths.

==== Durham ====
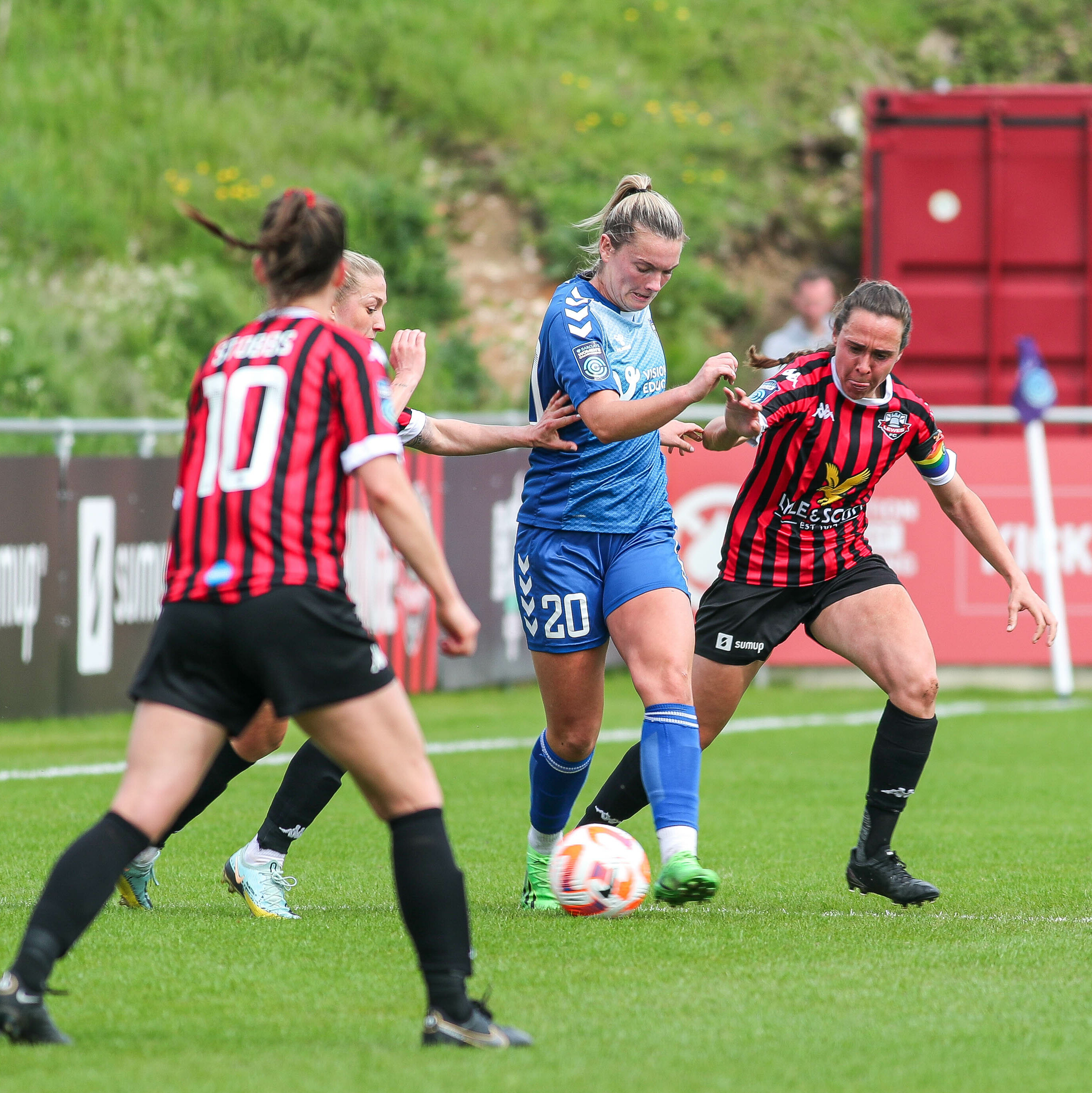
Lewes FC Women v Noonan in 2023

On the final day of the January 2022 transfer window, Noonan agreed to join FA Women's Championship club Durham WFC. After sustaining a knee injury in training shortly after joining her new club, she returned to Shelbourne on loan as part of her recuperation.

==== Celtic ====
In the 2024 summer transfer window, Noonan signed a three-year contract with Scottish Women's Premier League champions Celtic. She started her time in Scotland successfully, scoring twice in her debut performance against Dundee United. On 26 June 2026 Celtic announced that Noonan would depart the club having made a total of 71 appearances, scoring 57 goals including 5 hat-tricks.

==== Watford ====
On 24 July 2026, Noonan was announced at Watford.

=== International career ===
==== Youth ====
Noonan's first trial with the national team was at under-16 level. She was disappointed to be the final player to miss the cut. A few weeks later she attended trials for the under-15 schoolgirl team and this time was successful, being appointed captain for a match against England.

She represented the Republic of Ireland women's national under-17 football team in the 2015 UEFA Women's Under-17 Championship qualification elite round mini tournament at Turners Cross, scoring in a 2–0 win over England. At the final tournament in Iceland, Noonan was the team's midfield playmaker while her brother Eóin attended as an accredited photographer. She played through the pain of an injured ankle, as Ireland were eliminated after losing all three group matches.

Noonan continued with the under-17 national team and in March 2016 was the captain when they competed at the 2016 UEFA Women's Under-17 Championship qualification elite round in France. Although disappointed by Ireland's elimination after finishing second in a strong group, she was elevated to the Republic of Ireland women's national under-19 football team for a match against Belgium in September 2016. She was named FAI Under-17 Women's International Player of the Year for 2016.

With the under-19s Noonan competed in the 2017 UEFA Women's Under-19 Championship qualification series, scoring in the qualification round win over Italy in North Macedonia and against Ukraine in the elite round at Markets Field, Limerick. By the time of the following year's elite round at Turners Cross, Noonan was considered one of the team's outstanding players. Despite Noonan scoring a "towering header" in the opening 1–1 draw with Austria, Ireland were eliminated after a 3–0 defeat by Spain and a 2–0 defeat by Turkey. She concluded her under-19 national team career with seven goals in 20 appearances. She was one of three nominees for the 2018 FAI Under-19 Women's International Player of the Year award won by Niamh Farrelly.

==== Senior ====
In August 2016 Ireland coach Susan Ronan named Noonan in a young and predominantly home-based senior squad for a training camp in Wales. She won her first senior cap in the second of two scheduled friendly matches against the Welsh hosts. She partnered Stephanie Roche in Ireland's forward line for the final half an hour of the 2–1 win.

In October 2020 it was reported that Noonan's good form for Cork City had brought her to the attention of Ireland's senior national team coach Vera Pauw. Pauw confirmed that she had been closely monitoring Noonan's progress, but noted that there was intense competition for places in her preferred position. Under Pauw's predecessor Colin Bell Noonan had been restricted to the "fringes", but still attended national team training sessions for home-based players and still harboured ambitions of playing for Ireland.

On 10 November 2020 Pauw named Noonan in a provisional 31-player squad for the final UEFA Women's Euro 2022 qualifier against Germany, then praised her sporting prowess: "Playing two sports and just being so natural and so clinical about it is amazing". Pauw gave Noonan her first competitive appearance for Ireland in the opening 2023 FIFA Women's World Cup qualification – UEFA Group A fixture against Sweden at Tallaght Stadium on 21 October 2021. She was a 93rd-minute substitute for Lucy Quinn in Ireland's 1–0 defeat. On 30 November 2021 Noonan scored her first senior international goal, Ireland's ninth in a record 11–0 win over Georgia. On 3 June 2025 Noonan scored in a 1-0 UEFA Women's Nations League win over Slovenia, while becoming the first player to play in both competitive Gaelic games and a football match at Pairc Ui Chaoimh.

=== International appearances ===
Appearances and goals by national team and year
National team	Year	Apps	Goals
Republic of Ireland	2016	1	0
Republic of Ireland	2021	2	1
Republic of Ireland	2023	1	0
Republic of Ireland	2025	7	1
Republic of Ireland	2026	1	0
Total		12	2

=== International goals ===
Scores and results list Republic of Ireland's goals first. Score column indicates score after each Noonan goal. Updated as of 3 June 2025.

International goals scored by Saoirse Noonan
No.	Cap	Date	Venue	Opponent	Score	Result	Competition	Ref.
1	3	30 November 2021	Tallaght Stadium, Dublin, Ireland	Georgia	9–0	11–0	2019 FIFA Women's World Cup qualification	
2	7	3 June 2025	Páirc Uí Chaoimh	Slovenia	1–0	1–0	2025 UEFA Women's Nations	

== Gaelic football ==
Saoirse Noonan
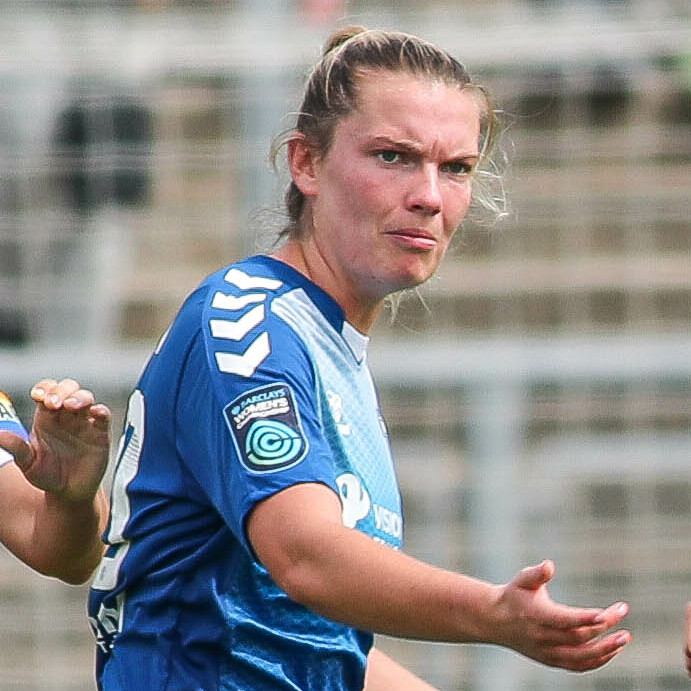

Personal information
- Native name: Saoirse Ní Nuanáin (Irish)
- Born: 13 July 1999 (age 27) Cork, Ireland
- Occupation: Student
- Height: 5 ft 7 in (170 cm)

Sport
- Sport: Ladies' Gaelic football
- Position: Full forward
Club
- Years: Club
- Nemo Rangers
Inter-county
- Years: County
- 2018–2020: Cork

=== Youth ===
In her early childhood Noonan began playing Gaelic football at the Nemo Rangers club, where her father was one of the coaches and her brother was a player in the youth system. She also played for her primary school Scoil Niocláis in the Sciath na Scol (English: Schools Shield) final at nine years old. At 11 she was part of a Nemo Rangers team who were narrowly defeated in the national semi-finals. With her secondary school Christ King she won Munster and All-Ireland medals at Junior level.

Noonan's potential was noticed by county selectors and in 2013 she won Munster and All-Ireland Under-14 Ladies' Football Championship titles with Cork's under-14 panel. The following year she added the All-Ireland Under-16 Ladies' Football Championship to her medal collection.

Soccer commitments with Ireland's under-17 national team kept Noonan away from Gaelic football fields for much of 2015. But when she went to watch some friends on Cork's minor team in their Munster semi-final against Tipperary in March 2016, the coach John Cleary persuaded her to join the team.

She was an immediate success at minor level, making her debut in a May 2016 victory over Kerry in the Munster final, playing against Galway in the All-Ireland semi-final and scoring one goal and 11 points across these first two appearances. She then scored 2–5 and was named Player of the Match in the All-Ireland final win over Dublin. This success was replicated in 2017, as Cork retained their All-Ireland minor title and Noonan scored a hat-trick in the final win over Galway.

=== Senior ===
Due to her soccer commitments, Noonan had intended to stop playing Gaelic football after the 2017 minor title win. She resisted overtures from the senior Cork county ladies' football team bainisteoir (English: manager) Ephie Fitzgerald, until Ireland's defeat in the 2018 UEFA Women's Under-19 Championship qualification round freed up her schedule somewhat and she agreed to join his senior panel.

She had a "dream debut" by contributing 2–2 as a half-time substitute in the Munster final win over Kerry in June 2018. She acquired a reputation as a prolific "super sub" by adding 4–9 in four more substitute appearances as Cork qualified for the 2018 All-Ireland Senior Ladies' Football Championship final. Impressed coach Ephie Fitzgerald praised "unbelievable" Noonan: "I firmly believe that Saoirse could be the face of ladies football for the next 10 years".

Noonan came on at half-time in the final but was well-marked by the Dublin defence and failed to score. Cork's defeat before a record 50,141 crowd at Croke Park left Noonan particularly disappointed because after years of success it was her first ever defeat in the colours of her county at any level. Despite a partially torn anterior cruciate ligament sustained playing soccer in November 2018, Noonan's good form continued into the 2019 Gaelic football season. She began to start games instead of being an impact substitute and increasingly began to assist teammates as well as continuing to score regularly herself. In July 2019 she scored 2–3 in Cork's Munster final win over Waterford, bringing her scoring total to 9–17 in less than 300 minutes of senior inter county football.

After playing for Cork in their 2020 All-Ireland Senior Ladies' Football Championship final defeat by Dublin, Noonan decided to pause her Gaelic football participation for at least one year, to focus on her soccer career.

== Personal life ==
An all-round sportswoman, Noonan played basketball until she was 12 years old but stopped when she was called up to the Cork under-14 inter-County Gaelic football panel. She also played camogie for the St. Finbarr's club until the disappointment of her failed trial for the Irish under-16 national soccer team caused her to prioritise soccer and Gaelic football. In October 2019 Noonan was one of three Irish women to attend an AFL Draft Combine in Melbourne, but she was unable to participate in the tests due to a knee injury.

Saoirse's younger sister Aoibhe Noonan also plays soccer. Aoibhe is a winger who has played for Douglas Hall and for Cork City in the 2019 Women's Under 17 National League. Her brother Eóin is two years her senior and works as a sports photographer, often covering events where Saoirse is competing. In 2021 Noonan launched her own clothing brand, called "Freedom" which is the English translation of her given name.

== Honours ==
=== Association football ===
Cork City

- FAI Women's Cup
  - Winner: 2017

Shelbourne

- Women's National League
  - Winner: 2021

Celtic

- Women's Scottish Cup
  - Winner: 2026

Individual

- FAI Under-17 Women's International Player of the Year
  - Winner: 2016
- Women's National League Young Player of the Year
  - Winner: 2017

=== Gaelic football ===
Cork

- All-Ireland Senior Ladies' Football Championship
  - Runner up: 2018, 2020
- Ladies' National Football League
  - Winner: 2019
