= Noel King (footballer) =

Irish footballer and manager

Personal information
- Date of birth: 13 September 1956 (age 70)
- Place of birth: Dublin, Ireland
- Position: Midfielder

Senior career*
Years	Team	Apps	(Gls)
1973–1977	Home Farm	78	(8)
1977–1978	Dundalk	30	(3)
1978–1979	Shamrock Rovers	11	(0)
1979–1980	Home Farm	30	(3)
1980–1982	Bohemians	55	(11)
1982–1983	Dundalk	25	(2)
1983–1985	Shamrock Rovers	51	(7)
1985	Valenciennes	7	(1)
1985–1987	Derry City		
1987–1988	Waterford United		
1988–1991	Shamrock Rovers		
1992–1993	Limerick City	15	(0)
1993–1994	Omagh Town	1	(0)
1994–1997	Limerick City		

International career
1976–1986	League of Ireland XI	?	(0)

Managerial career
- 1985–1987: Derry City
- 1988–1991: Shamrock Rovers
- 1992–1993: Limerick
- 1995–1997: Limerick
- 2003: Finn Harps
- 2000–2010: Republic of Ireland (women)
- 2010–2018: Republic of Ireland U-21s (men)
- 2013: Republic of Ireland (men) (Interim)
- 2021–2023: Shelbourne (women)
- 2024: Dundalk
- * Club domestic league appearances and goals

Noel King (born 13 September 1956) is a former professional footballer and manager. For 10 years from 2000 until 2010 he was manager of the Republic of Ireland women's national team. He was appointed interim men's national team senior manager on 23 September 2013 following the resignation of Giovanni Trapattoni.

== Playing career ==
King was born in Dublin. During his career he played for Dundalk (two spells), Shamrock Rovers (three spells), Home Farm, Bohemians, Valenciennes, Derry City, and Limerick.

He was a substitute on Home Farm's FAI Cup winning side of 1975 as a teenager. He made his European bow the following season in the 1975–76 European Cup Winners' Cup playing in Farm's only 2 European games. King signed for Dundalk in 1977 and played 2 games in the 1977–78 European Cup Winners' Cup as well as being ever present in that league campaign. The following season he signed for Shamrock Rovers Playing at right-back, he was sent off on his debut in the President's Cup final defeat to Bohemians at Milltown on 30 August 1978. He played 19 consecutive games and 4 in the 1978–79 European Cup Winners' Cup while also earning his Football Association coaching badge.

He then went to Home Farm before linking up with Bohemians for two seasons, and then it was back to Dundalk where he played 2 games in the 1982–83 European Cup. His second stint at Milltown saw him link up with Rovers manager Jim McLaughlin, this time as player/coach. His fiery style of play combined with his great coaching abilities won him two League and one FAI Cup medal with the now resurgent Hoops. He made 76 appearances in this second stint including two in the 1984-85 European Cup.

The call for a fresh challenge saw King move to French second division club Valenciennes where he played for the first team and coached their youths side. In November 1985 he left France to become player-manager at Derry. He had his contract terminated in November 1987. He then moved to Waterford United for the rest of that 1987–88 League of Ireland Premier Division season.

He played for the Republic of Ireland national football team amateur team that qualified and reached the semi-finals of the 1978 UEFA Amateur Cup. In January 1977 he played for the League of Ireland XI team against Italian League B which included Gaetano Scirea.

== Management career ==
=== Club ===
In July 1988 King was appointed manager of Shamrock Rovers, The club was in a mess after losing Glenmalure Park and Noel was quoted "I have the best job I have ever had in football. It's the biggest tradition, the biggest club, in the country. We don't have the size of Derry's support but we're a bigger club".

In February 1990 King was awarded undisclosed damages in settlement of his libel action against the BBC.

He was sacked after three years in charge in December 1991 after guiding the club to the 1991 FAI Cup Final.

In July 1992 King was appointed manager of Limerick FC but despite a League of Ireland Cup and a top six finish win he left in May 1993. Then he resigned in August but was reappointed in October.

In July 1994 he returned as a director and as a player. The following season King played as well as being the club's general manager and later in the season back to manager.

In 2001, he replaced Dermot Keely who was on medical rest as Shelbourne won the Title. He again worked with Shelbourne's management team in 2002, after coaching in the League of Ireland with Drogheda United. He also managed Finn Harps during their play-off battle with fierce local rivals Derry City in 2003.

On 31 December 2020, King was appointed manager of the Shelbourne Women's National League team for the 2021 and 2022 seasons.

On 20 April 2024, he was appointed manager of League of Ireland Premier Division club Dundalk, who found themselves bottom of the league at the time of the appointment. On 15 May 2024, King announced that he would leave the club with immediate effect for medical reasons.

=== International ===
King was appointed the manager of the Ireland Women's senior team in 2000. In 2009, the team missed out on qualification to the European Championships, losing in a play-off to Iceland. In 2010 under his guidance, the women's under-17 team finished runners up at the 2010 UEFA Championship and qualified for the 2010 World Cup.

After his success with the Irish women's squads, King was appointed the head coach of the Republic of Ireland under-21 side in July 2010. His first game in charge at Tallaght Stadium ended in a record win.

He was also part of the Republic of Ireland coaching staff, attending the 1990 World Cup as a team coach.

On 23 September 2013, King was named as interim Ireland senior manager following the resignation of Giovanni Trapattoni. In his first game in charge on 11 October 2013, Ireland lost 3–0 away to Germany in a 2014 FIFA World Cup qualifier at the RheinEnergieStadion. In his second and final game in charge on 15 October, Ireland defeated Kazakhstan 3–1 at the Aviva Stadium.

On 7 November 2018, King retired as U21 manager of the Republic of Ireland, taking up the role of Player Identification Manager for the Football Association of Ireland in the process.

== Sources ==
- Paul Doolan; Robert Goggins. The Hoops. ISBN 0-7171-2121-6.
- Robert Goggins. The Four-in-a-Row Story.
