= Ciara Rossiter =

Irish footballer (born 1996)

Personal information
- Date of birth: 12 February 1996 (age 30)
- Place of birth: Wexford, Ireland
- Position: Defender

Team information
- Current team: Wexford Youths
- Number: 12

Youth career
- Forth Celtic AFC

Senior career*
Years	Team	Apps	(Gls)
2012–2016	Wexford Youths		
2018	Wexford Youths	1	(0)
2019–	Wexford Youths		

International career^{‡}
2011–2013	Republic of Ireland U17	8	(0)
2013–2014	Republic of Ireland U19	4	(0)
2015	Republic of Ireland	1	(0)
- * Club domestic league appearances and goals ‡ National team caps and goals as of 23 January 2016

Ciara Rossiter (born 12 February 1996) is an Irish footballer who plays as a defender for Women's National League club Wexford Youths Women FC. She has been a member of the Republic of Ireland women's national team. She is a left-sided full-back who can also play in midfield.

== Club career ==
Rossiter is from Rathaspeck in County Wexford. At youth level she played soccer for Forth Celtic, as well as camogie and Gaelic football for the local St Martin's GAA club. Rossiter made her first Women's National League (WNL) appearances for Wexford Youths in 2012–13.

She found success in the 2014–15 season; being named in the league Team of the Season and awarded the Young Player of the Year as Wexford Youths won the championship. She also played in the club's subsequent 2015–16 UEFA Women's Champions League campaign in August 2015.

In November 2015 Wexford Youths won the FAI Women's Cup for the first time. In the final at the Aviva Stadium Rossiter's injury time equaliser helped them prevail over Shelbourne, 4–2 on penalties after a 2–2 draw. In March 2016 she suffered an anterior cruciate ligament injury while playing in a Universities Cup final for Waterford Institute of Technology against Institute of Technology, Sligo.

In March 2018 Rossiter made a Wexford Youths comeback under the Ferrycarrig Park club's new manager Tom Elmes, only to be stretchered off again during their opening day 5–0 win over Limerick. She re-signed for Wexford Youths for the 2019 WNL season.

== International career ==
=== Youth ===
Rossiter played for Ireland at schoolgirl level in the 2010–11 season, while attending Presentation School in Wexford. In October 2011 she played in all three games for the Republic of Ireland women's national under-17 football team in their successful 2012 UEFA Women's Under-17 Championship qualification campaign in North Macedonia.

While enrolled at Waterford Institute of Technology, Rossiter represented Ireland at the 2015 edition of the Summer Universiade.

=== Senior ===
In May 2015, Rossiter was one of five uncapped players given senior national team call-ups for a friendly in the United States. After the match had been arranged, it was discovered to be outside FIFA's designated dates for international matches, so several of Ireland's first-choice players were not released by their professional clubs. Rossiter won her debut cap as an 83rd-minute substitute for Julie-Ann Russell in Ireland's 3–0 defeat.

Rossiter was called up again for a UEFA Women's Euro 2017 qualifying fixture against Spain in November 2015. National coach Susan Ronan had noted her impressive performances for Wexford Youths' FAI Women's Cup-winning team. She was picked for another trip to the United States in January 2016, remaining an unused substitute in Ireland's 5–0 defeat by the senior United States national team but starting a 3–0 defeat by the hosts' national under-23 team two days later.
