= 2021 Women's National League (Ireland) =

Women's National League
- Season: 2021
- Dates: 27 March 2021 – 13 November 2021
- Champions: Shelbourne; 2nd title
- Champions League: Shelbourne
- Matches: 108
- Top goalscorer: Áine O'Gorman (16 goals)
- Biggest home win: Peamount United 8–1 Cork City (30 October 2021)
- Biggest away win: Treaty United 0–10 Peamount United (3 October 2021)
- Highest scoring: Treaty United 0–10 Peamount United (3 October 2021)
- Highest attendance: 1,007 Cork City 3–1 Treaty United (6 November 2021)
- All statistics correct as of 13 November 2021.

The 2021 Women's National League, known as the SSE Airtricity WNL for sponsorship reasons, is the 11th season of the Women's National League, the highest women's association football league in the Republic of Ireland since its establishment in 2011. Peamount United were the defending champions, having won their third league title the previous season.

In January 2021 the League attracted a new title sponsor, as SSE Airtricity agreed a two-year renewal of their existing deal with the (men's) League of Ireland and extended it to also cover the WNL. The Bank of Ireland also signed a three-year deal as an associate sponsor of the League of Ireland and WNL. This followed a season without a WNL sponsorship deal in 2020.

The 1,007 spectators at Cork City's 3–1 win over Treaty United on 6 November 2021 at Turners Cross set a new WNL record for the highest attendance.

A dramatic conclusion to the season saw defending champions Peamount United unexpectedly squander a two-goal lead to lose 5–2 at home to Galway on the final match day, allowing Shelbourne to claim the title with their 3–2 win over Wexford Youths. Both matches were subject to live television coverage, following the WNL's agreement of a broadcast arrangement with TG4 in September 2021.

During the season a number of players transferred to professional clubs in England and Scotland. Peamount manager James O'Callaghan called for the formation of a task force, to examine the possibility of making the WNL semi-professional in future: "It's great for those players that they are getting to play professionally, but it's not great for the league to be losing them."

== Teams ==
The same nine teams who had contested the abridged 2020 season returned for 2021.

Team	Home town/suburb	Stadium	2020 finish
Athlone Town	Athlone	Athlone Town Stadium	7th
Bohemians	Dublin (Coolock)	Oscar Traynor Centre	9th
Cork City	Cork	Turners Cross	4th
Galway	Galway	Eamonn Deacy Park	5th
Treaty United	Limerick	Markets Field	8th
Peamount United	Newcastle, County Dublin	Greenogue	1st
Shelbourne	Dublin (Drumcondra)	Tolka Park	2nd
DLR Waves	Dublin (Belfield)	UCD Bowl	6th
Wexford Youths	Crossabeg	Ferrycarrig Park	3rd

=== Personnel and kits ===
Note: Flags indicate national team as has been defined under FIFA eligibility rules. Players may hold more than one non-FIFA nationality.

Team	Manager	Captain	Kit manufacturer	Shirt sponsor
Athlone Town	(Republic of Ireland) Tommy Hewitt	(Republic of Ireland) Kayla Brady	Nike	Stodge Face
Bohemians	(Republic of Ireland) Sean Byrne	(Republic of Ireland) Sophie Watters	O'Neills	ICHH - Inner City Helping Homeless
Cork City	(Republic of Ireland) Rónán Collins	(Republic of Ireland) Becky Cassin	Adidas	Jackie Lennox Chip Shop
DLR Waves	(Republic of Ireland) Graham Kelly	(Republic of Ireland) Catherine Cronin	Jako	CDS - Clare Distribution Services
Galway	(Republic of Ireland) Billy Clery	(Republic of Ireland) Shauna Fox	Acerbis	The Plaza Group
Peamount United	(Republic of Ireland) James O'Callaghan	(Republic of Ireland) Áine O'Gorman	Uhlsport	SPAR Kelly's Newcastle
Shelbourne	(Republic of Ireland) Noel King	(Republic of Ireland) Pearl Slattery	Umbro	Hamptons Homes
Treaty United	(Republic of Ireland) Niall Connolly	(Republic of Ireland) Esra Kangal	Umbro	Ei Electronics
Wexford Youths	(England) Tom Elmes	(Republic of Ireland) Kylie Murphy	Jako	Energia

=== Managerial changes ===
Team	Outgoing manager	Manner of departure	Date of vacancy	Position in table	Incoming manager	Date of appointment
Shelbourne	(England) Dave Bell	Resignation	16 December 2020	Pre-season	(Republic of Ireland) Noel King	31 December 2020
Treaty United	(Republic of Ireland) Dave Rooney	Resignation	1 January 2021	Pre-season	(Republic of Ireland) Niall Connolly	17 January 2021
Galway	(Republic of Ireland) Billy Clery	Resignation	19 May 2021	5th	(Republic of Ireland) Stephen Lally	22 May 2021
Cork City	(Republic of Ireland) Rónán Collins	Resignation	28 May 2021	9th	(Republic of Ireland) Paul Farrell	16 June 2021
Wexford Youths	(England) Tom Elmes	Resignation	9 June 2021	3rd	(Republic of Ireland) Stephen Quinn	9 June 2021
Treaty United	(Republic of Ireland) Niall Connolly	Mutual consent	12 October 2021	9th		

== Format ==
The nine teams play each other three times, with a mid-season break from 7 June to 25 June 2021.

== League table ==
=== Standings ===
Pos	Team	Pld	W	D	L	GF	GA	GD	Pts	Qualification or relegation
1	Shelbourne	24	20	1	3	65	22	+43	61	Qualification for the UEFA Women's Champions League
2	Peamount United	24	19	3	2	81	18	+63	60	
3	Wexford Youths	24	17	4	3	64	17	+47	55	
4	DLR Waves	24	12	3	9	34	24	+10	39	
5	Galway	24	8	5	11	36	45	−9	29	
6	Bohemians	24	5	4	15	30	51	−21	19	
7	Athlone Town	24	4	7	13	27	59	−32	19	
8	Cork City	24	4	4	16	28	61	−33	16	
9	Treaty United	24	2	3	19	27	95	−68	9	

Updated to match(es) played on 13 November 2021. Source: FAI Women’s National League, Soccerway, Extratime.com

=== Positions by round ===
The table lists the positions of teams after each week of matches. In order to preserve chronological evolvements, any postponed matches are not included to the round at which they were originally scheduled, but added to the full round they were played immediately afterwards.

Team ╲ Round	1	2	3	4	5	6	7	8	9	10	11	12	13	14	15	16	17	18	19	20	21	22	23	24	25	26	27
Athlone Town	8	7	8	8	8	8	8	6	7	8	8	9	9	9	9	8	9	9	9	7	7	8	7	7	7	7	7
Bohemians	1	3	4	6	6	6	6	7	6	6	6	6	7	7	7	7	8	6	6	6	6	6	6	6	6	6	6
Cork City	4	8	7	7	7	7	7	9	9	9	9	8	8	8	8	9	6	7	7	8	8	7	8	8	8	8	8
DLR Waves	6	5	6	4	4	4	4	4	4	4	4	4	4	4	4	4	4	4	4	4	4	4	4	4	4	4	4
Galway	4	2	5	3	5	5	5	5	5	5	5	5	5	5	5	5	5	5	5	5	5	5	5	5	5	5	5
Peamount United	3	4	2	1	1	1	1	1	1	1	1	2	1	1	2	1	1	1	1	2	1	1	1	1	1	1	2
Shelbourne	2	1	1	5	3	3	3	2	2	2	2	1	2	2	1	2	2	2	2	1	2	3	3	3	3	2	1
Treaty United	9	9	9	9	9	9	9	8	8	7	7	7	6	6	6	6	8	8	8	9	9	9	9	9	9	9	9
Wexford Youths	7	6	3	2	2	2	2	3	3	3	3	3	3	3	3	3	3	3	3	3	3	2	2	2	2	3	3

Updated to match(es) played on 12 November 2021. Source: Extratime.com
= Leader and UEFA Women's Champions League; = Second; = Third

== Results ==
=== Matches 1–24 ===
Teams play each other three times, with one team idle on every round of fixtures.

Home \ Away	ATH	BOH	COR	DLR	GAL	PEA	SHE	TRE	WEX
Athlone Town	—	2–3	2–2	0–1	1–2	1–2	0–2	3–3	1–3
Bohemians	3–0	—	3–3	0–3	1–1	0–3	0–1	6–2	0–1
Cork City	2–2	1–0	—	0–1	0–2	0–5	0–3	2–3	1–3
DLR Waves	1–1	1–2	1–0	—	2–1	0–2	1–2	5–2	1–1
Galway	3–4	3–1	3–3	0–2	—	0–3	1–2	4–1	0–1
Peamount United	6–0	2–0	3–1	2–1	4–0	—	2–1	5–1	2–2
Shelbourne	5–0	3–2	1–0	2–1	5–0	4–3	—	7–2	0–0
Treaty United	2–2	2–1	1–2	0–5	2–2	0–3	0–5	—	1–7
Wexford	1–0	7–1	4–1	3–1	5–0	0–1	1–0	2–1	—

Updated to match(es) played on 12 September 2021. Source: Extratime.com
Legend: Blue = home team win; Yellow = draw; Red = away team win.

Home \ Away	ATH	BOH	COR	DLR	GAL	PEA	SHE	TRE	WEX
Athlone Town	—	1–1	2–0	1–0	—	—	—	2–1	—
Bohemians	—	—	2–0	—	—	0–3	1–3	5–1	—
Cork City	—	—	—	4–1	—	—	1–3	3–1	0–1
DLR Waves	—	1–0	—	—	2–0	0–0	—	—	0–1
Galway	1–1	0–0	6–1	—	—	—	—	1–0	—
Peamount United	4–0	—	8–1	—	2–5	—	5–0	—	—
Shelbourne	4–0	—	—	1–0	2–0	—	—	—	3–2
Treaty United	—	—	—	1–3	—	0–10	0–6	—	0–4
Wexford	7–1	7–0	—	—	0–1	1–1	—	—	—

Source: Extratime.com
Legend: Blue = home team win; Yellow = draw; Red = away team win.

== Statistics ==
=== Top scorers ===
Last updated after fixtures on 13 November 2021.

Rank	Player	Club	Goals
1	(Republic of Ireland) Áine O'Gorman	Peamount United	16
2	(Republic of Ireland) Kylie Murphy	Wexford Youths	15
3	(Republic of Ireland) Eleanor Ryan Doyle	Peamount United	14
3	(Republic of Ireland) Ellen Molloy	Wexford Youths	14
5	(Republic of Ireland) Saoirse Noonan	Shelbourne	12
6	(Republic of Ireland) Jenna Slattery	Treaty United	10

Source: Extratime.com

== Awards ==
=== Monthly awards ===
Month	Player of the Month		References
Month	Player	Club	References
April	Rachel Kearns	Galway	
May	Eleanor Ryan-Doyle	Peamount	
June/July	Kylie Murphy	Wexford	
August	Savannah McCarthy	Galway	
September	Karen Duggan	Peamount	
October	Jessie Stapleton	Shelbourne	
November	Ellen Molloy	Wexford Youths	

=== Annual awards ===
Award	Winner	Club
WNL Player of the Year	Kylie Murphy	Wexford Youths
Young Player of the Year	Aoibheann Clancy	Wexford Youths
Manager of the Year	Noel King	Shelbourne

WNL Team of the Year
Goalkeeper	Eve Badana (DLR Waves)				
Defenders	Jessie Stapleton (Shelbourne)		Lauren Dwyer (Wexford Youths)		Savannah McCarthy (Galway)
Midfielders	Áine O'Gorman (Peamount United)	Ciara Grant (Shelbourne)	Karen Duggan (Peamount United)	Aoibheann Clancy (Wexford Youths)	Ciara Rossiter (Wexford Youths)
Forwards	Kylie Murphy (Wexford Youths)			Ellen Molloy (Wexford Youths)	

== Broadcasting ==
In February 2021 the Football Association of Ireland announced that all WNL matches would be streamed worldwide, free of charge on the new LOITV platform. In September 2021 the TG4 Irish language television network agreed a deal to broadcast four matches. Alex Kavanagh scored the first televised goal, in Shelbourne's 1–0 win over DLR Waves at Tolka Park. The 309,000 viewing figures exceeded expectations, and TG4 extended the arrangement into the following season.

== See also ==
- 2021 FAI Women's Cup
