= Republic of Ireland women's national football team =

Women's national association football team representing the Republic of Ireland

Republic of Ireland
- Nickname: The Girls in Green (Irish: Na cailíní i nglas)
- Association: Women's Football Association of Ireland
- Confederation: UEFA (Europe)
- Head coach: Carla Ward
- Captain: Katie McCabe
- Most caps: Emma Byrne (134)
- Top scorer: Olivia O'Toole (54)
- Home stadium: Tallaght Stadium/Aviva Stadium
- FIFA code: IRL
First colours	Second colours

FIFA ranking
- Current: 21 (20 October 2026)
- Highest: 21 (June 2026 - present)
- Lowest: 38 (July – August 2003)

First international
- Wales 2–3 Republic of Ireland (Llanelli, Wales; 13 May 1973)

Biggest win
- Republic of Ireland 11–0 Georgia (Tallaght, Dublin, Ireland; 30 November 2021)

Biggest defeat
- Sweden 10–0 Republic of Ireland (Borås, Sweden; 20 September 1992)

World Cup
- Appearances: 1 (first in 2023)
- Best result: Group stage (2023)
- Website: Official website

The Republic of Ireland women's national football team (Irish: Foireann sacair ban Phoblacht na hÉireann) represents the Republic of Ireland in competitions such as the FIFA Women's World Cup and the UEFA Women's Championship. The team played in their first World Cup at the 2023 FIFA Women's World Cup. It has taken part in invitational tournaments such as the Algarve Cup, the Istria Cup, the Cyprus Cup and Pinatar Cup. It is organised by the Women's Football Association of Ireland.

== History ==
In 1973, the Women's Football Association of Ireland was established and in the same year on 13 May the Republic of Ireland made their official international debut, Paula Gorham's hat-trick securing a 3–2 win in an away friendly game against Wales. They made their competitive debut on 19 September 1982 in a 1984 European Competition for Women's Football qualifier against Scotland. This time the Republic of Ireland lost 3–0. On 2 October 1982 the Republic of Ireland gained their first competitive win when they defeated Northern Ireland 2–1 in an away game in the same competition. After losing 10–0 to Sweden in a Euro 1993 qualifier, the FAI did not enter a team in the 1995 competition. This defeat against Sweden remains the team's biggest defeat.

During the 2000s the Republic of Ireland enjoyed some minor successes. In 2000 they won the Celt Cup – a four team tournament that also featured Northern Ireland, Scotland and the Isle of Man. In their 2005 UEFA Women's Euro campaign they also won their second level group, finishing above Romania, Croatia, Bosnia and Herzegovina and Malta. This would have secured promotion to the elite group of nations which competed directly for qualification to major tournaments, had the two level system not been scrapped for the next qualifying campaign. The Republic of Ireland also won their group at the 2013 Cyprus Cup, finishing above South Korea, South Africa and Northern Ireland.

The Republic of Ireland has also enjoyed some success at both under-17 and under-19 levels. In 2010, with a team that included Megan Campbell, Ciara Grant, Dora Gorman, Denise O'Sullivan, Siobhán Killeen and Clare Shine, the Republic of Ireland U-17 squad were runners-up in the 2010 UEFA Women's Under-17 Championship and quarter-finalists in the 2010 FIFA U-17 Women's World Cup. In the UEFA championship semi-final the Republic of Ireland defeated Germany 1–0. With a team that included Megan Connolly, Savannah McCarthy and Katie McCabe the Republic of Ireland team won their group at the 2014 UEFA Women's Under-19 Championship and qualified for the semi-finals.

In April 2017, the squad demanded better treatment from the FAI and threatened to boycott a home match against Slovakia. They wanted a higher match fee, and broken time payment for amateurs missing work. They claimed that they had to share with underage teams the tracksuits they wore travelling to and from away matches, and change out of them in airport toilets. The boycott threat was lifted when agreement on improvements was reached.

In November 2021 the team recorded their biggest ever win: 11–0 against Georgia in the qualifiers for 2023 World Cup. The team secured a crucial victory in their World Cup qualifying campaign, defeating Finland 1-0 in a Group A match. The decisive goal was scored in the second half by substitute Lily Agg, allowing the Irish team to claim second place in the group with one game remaining. This achievement was soon surpassed when Ireland won the play-off final 1–0 over Scotland in Glasgow on 11 October 2022 to qualify for the final tournament. A crucial first-half penalty save from Courtney Brosnan kept Ireland alive before Donegal native Amber Barrett scored the decisive goal, days after news of an explosion that killed several people in her county. She dedicated the goal to the victims and the community. While celebrating in the Hampden changing rooms, several players sang Celtic Symphony praising the Irish Republican Army, for which manager Vera Pauw and players Áine O'Gorman and Chloe Mustaki apologised; the chanting was condemned by politicians from Northern Ireland. The FAI was fined €20,000 for the chanting.

They played their first ever Women's World Cup game on 20 July 2023, losing 1–0 to Australia, one of the co-host nations of the competition, following a penalty. Ireland was then beaten by Canada, the reigning Olympic champion (1–2), after leading 1–0 for much of the first half and was mathematically eliminated after 2 days despite a good performance. The girls in green leave the competition with honors by finishing bottom of group B but with one point, after holding Nigeria (0–0) in check.

On September 23, 2023, the Republic of Ireland team played a match at Aviva Stadium in Dublin for the first time in its history. The match was played in front of 35,994 spectators, setting a new attendance record for a women's soccer match in Ireland (the previous record was 7,633 at Tallaght Stadium in July 2023 against France). The match is the first game of the new Women's Nations League, the national team's first game since the World Cup, and the first game since Vera Pauw's departure. The Irish won the match 3–0 against their Northern Irish neighbors.

After six Nations League matches marked by six wins and promotion to Group A, Eileen Gleeson was confirmed in her position on December 18, 2023. Her assistants were confirmed in their positions in February 2024: Emma Byrne, the most capped player in history, and Colin Healy, former coach of Cork City F.C.. The second half of Gleeson's tenure proved to be much more complicated. Placed in an extremely strong Euro 2025 qualifying group with France, England, and Sweden, three major teams in European women's soccer, the Irish finished in last place despite a prestigious victory in Cork against France. Qualifying for the play-offs, the Irish lost in the final qualifying round to Wales. Following this elimination, the FAI announced that Gleeson and her staff would not be reappointed.

== Home stadium ==
Throughout their history, the Republic of Ireland have played their home games at various grounds, including Dalymount Park, Tolka Park, Richmond Park and Turners Cross. They have also played the occasional game at Glenmalure Park, Belfield Park, Carlisle Grounds, Ferrycarrig Park, Flancare Park and at Lamberton, Arklow.

While they have played the majority of their home games at Tallaght Stadium since 2013, the national team played their first home game at the Aviva Stadium in September 2023.

In 2024, the Republic of Ireland played at Páirc Uí Chaoimh for the first time in a Euro 2025 qualifier match against France.

== Results and fixtures ==
The following is a list of match results in the last 12 months, as well as any future matches that have been scheduled.

Legend

Win Draw Loss Fixture

=== 2025 ===
29 November Friendly	Republic of Ireland	3–2	Hungary	Marbella, Spain
12:30 CET	Larkin 8'; Carusa 19'; O'Sullivan 53'	Report	Vincze 27'; Kaján 89'	Stadium: Marbella Football Center; Attendance: 0 (behind closed doors); Referee: Seth Galia (Gibraltar)

=== 2026 ===
3 March 2027 FIFA Women's World Cup Qualifiers	Republic of Ireland	1–2	France	Dublin, Ireland
19:30 GMT	McCabe 12'	Report	Malard 71', 79'	Stadium: Tallaght Stadium; Attendance: 8,376; Referee: Tess Olofsson (Sweden)

7 March 2027 FIFA Women's World Cup Qualifiers	Netherlands	2–1	Republic of Ireland	Utrecht, Netherlands
20:45 CET	Beerensteyn 20', 82'	Report	McCabe 50' (pen.)	Stadium: Stadion Galgenwaard; Attendance: 12,244; Referee: Frida Klarlund (Denmark)

14 April 2027 FIFA Women's World Cup Qualifiers	Poland	2–3	Republic of Ireland	Gdańsk, Poland
18:00 CEST	Pawollek 43'; Pajor 78'	Report	Murphy 12'; McCabe 20'; Sheva 59'	Stadium: Gdańsk Stadium; Attendance: 4,270; Referee: Hristiyana Guteva (Bulgaria)

18 April 2027 FIFA Women's World Cup Qualifiers	Republic of Ireland	1–0	Poland	Dublin, Ireland
15:00 IST	Sheva 42'	Report		Stadium: Aviva Stadium; Attendance: 18,267; Referee: Aleksandra Cesen (Sweden)

5 June 2027 FIFA Women's World Cup Qualifiers	Republic of Ireland	3–2	Netherlands	Cork, Ireland
19:30 IST	Carusa 19'; Larkin 71'; Barrett 90'	Report	Janssen 70' (pen.); Pelova 81'	Stadium: Páirc Uí Chaoimh; Attendance: 12,569; Referee: Katalin Kulcsár (Hungary)

9 June 2027 FIFA Women's World Cup Qualifiers	France	1–0	Republic of Ireland	Grenoble, France
CEST	Malard 40'	Report		Stadium: Stade des Alpes; Attendance: 7,559; Referee: Désirée Blanco (Switzerland)

9 October 2027 FIFA Women's World Cup Qualifiers	Kazakhstan	0–8	Republic of Ireland	Astana, Kazakhstan
16:00 UTC+5		Report	Carusa 7', 28'; Mustaki 16'; Murphy 44'; Larkin 45+3'; Finn 58'; Hopcroft 73'; Stapleton 90'	Stadium: Astana Arena; Attendance: 1,000; Referee: Karoline Marie Jensen (Norway)

13 October 2027 FIFA Women's World Cup Qualifiers	Republic of Ireland	4–0 (12–0 agg.)	Kazakhstan	Cork, Ireland
19:30 IST	Stapleton 40'; McCabe 48'; Quinn 70'; O'Sullivan 73'	Report		Stadium: Páirc Uí Chaoimh; Attendance: 10,334; Referee: Michaela Pachtová (Czech Republic)

1 December 2027 FIFA Women's World Cup Qualifiers	Poland	v	Republic of Ireland	Gdańsk, Poland
18:00 CEST		Report		Stadium: Gdańsk Stadium

5 December 2027 FIFA Women's World Cup Qualifiers	Republic of Ireland	v	Poland	Dublin, Ireland
17:00 GMT		Report		Stadium: Aviva Stadium

=== 2027 ===
2 March 2027 UEFA Nations League	Republic of Ireland	v	Switzerland	Ireland
		Report

6 March 2027 UEFA Nations League	Republic of Ireland	v	Norway	Ireland
		Report

20 April 2027 UEFA Nations League	Spain	v	Republic of Ireland	Spain
		Report

24 April 2027 UEFA Nations League	Switzerland	v	Republic of Ireland	Switzerland
		Report

11 June 2027 UEFA Nations League	Republic of Ireland	v	Spain	Ireland
		Report

15 June 2027 UEFA Nations League	Norway	v	Republic of Ireland	Norway
		Report

== Coaching staff ==
=== Current coaching staff ===
As of 6 October 2026.

Role	Name
Head coach	(England) Carla Ward
Assistant Head Coach	(Australia) Stephen Neligan
Assistant Coach	(England) Amber Whiteley
Goalkeeping Coach	(Republic of Ireland) Emma Byrne

=== Manager history ===
As of 13 October 2026 after the match against Kazakhstan.

#	Name	Year(s)	Matches	Wins	Draws	Losses	Win %	Ref.
1	(Republic of Ireland) Tony Kelly	1981–1983	10	2	1	7	20.00	
2	(Republic of Ireland) Eamonn Darcy	1984–1986	5	2	0	3	40.00	
3	(Republic of Ireland) Fran Rooney	1986–1991	14	4	3	7	28.57	
4	(Republic of Ireland) Linda Gorman	1991–1992	3	1	0	2	33.33	
5	(Republic of Ireland) Mick Cooke	1992–2000	33	16	4	13	48.48	
6	(Republic of Ireland) Noel King	2000–2010	70	25	13	32	35.71	
7	(Republic of Ireland) Susan Ronan	2010–2016	56	19	9	28	33.93	
8	(England) Colin Bell	2017–2019	21	9	4	8	42.86	
9	(Republic of Ireland) Tom O'Connor	2019 (interim)	2	1	0	1	50.00	
10	(Netherlands) Vera Pauw	2019–2023	34	15	5	14	44.12	
11	(Republic of Ireland) Eileen Gleeson	2023–2024	18	9	2	7	50.00	
12	(England) Carla Ward	2025–present	19	12	0	7	63.16	

== Players ==
=== Current squad ===
The following players were called up for the 2027 FIFA Women's World Cup qualification play-off matches against Poland on 1 and 5 December 2026.

Caps and goals correct as of 13 October 2026, after the match against Kazakhstan.

No.	Pos.	Player	Date of birth (age)	Caps	Goals	Club
	GK	Courtney Brosnan	10 November 1995 (age 31)	59	0	(The Football Association) Everton
	GK	Grace Moloney	1 March 1993 (age 33)	9	0	(The Football Association) Southampton
	GK	Sophie Whitehouse	10 October 1996 (age 30)	1	0	(The Football Association) Charlton Athletic
	DF	Katie McCabe (captain)	21 September 1995 (age 31)	108	35	(The Football Association) Chelsea
	DF	Heather Payne	20 January 2000 (age 26)	51	2	(The Football Association) Leicester City
	DF	Lucy Quinn	29 September 1993 (age 33)	35	6	(The Football Association) Sheffield United
	DF	Caitlin Hayes	22 September 1995 (age 31)	34	2	(The Football Association) Brighton & Hove Albion
	DF	Anna Patten	20 April 1999 (age 27)	27	3	(The Football Association) Aston Villa
	DF	Aoife Mannion	24 September 1995 (age 31)	27	1	(The Football Association) Newcastle United
	DF	Jessie Stapleton	7 February 2005 (age 21)	22	4	(The Football Association) Leicester City
	DF	Chloe Mustaki	29 July 1995 (age 31)	20	1	(The Football Association) Nottingham Forest
	DF	Hayley Nolan	7 March 1997 (age 29)	7	0	(The Football Association) Crystal Palace
	MF	Denise O'Sullivan	4 February 1994 (age 32)	133	23	(United States Soccer Federation) Gotham FC
	MF	Megan Connolly	7 March 1997 (age 29)	72	4	(Italian Football Federation) Lazio
	MF	Tyler Toland	8 August 2001 (age 25)	29	1	(The Football Association) Burnley
	MF	Marissa Sheva	22 April 1997 (age 29)	27	5	(The Football Association) Sunderland
	MF	Jamie Finn	21 April 1998 (age 28)	23	1	(The Football Association) Burnley
	MF	Shanade Hopcroft	3 October 1997 (age 29)	2	1	(The Football Association) Crystal Palace
	MF	Aoibheann Clancy	31 October 2003 (age 23)	1	0	(The Football Association) Watford
	FW	Amber Barrett	10 January 1996 (age 30)	61	10	(French Football Federation) Strasbourg
	FW	Kyra Carusa	14 November 1995 (age 31)	47	15	(Danish Football Association) HB Køge
	FW	Leanne Kiernan	27 April 1999 (age 27)	45	4	(The Football Association) Newcastle United
	FW	Abbie Larkin	27 April 2005 (age 21)	39	5	(The Football Association) Crystal Palace
	FW	Emily Murphy	2 March 2003 (age 23)	20	3	(The Football Association) Brighton & Hove Albion
	FW	Saoirse Noonan	13 July 1999 (age 27)	14	2	(The Football Association) Watford

=== Recent call-ups ===
The following players have also been called up to the squad within the past 12 months.

Pos.	Player	Date of birth (age)	Caps	Goals	Club	Latest call-up
DF	Maria Reynolds	20 April 2004 (age 22)	0	0	(England) Sheffield United	v. Poland, 18 April 2026
DF	Tara O'Hanlon	14 March 2005 (age 21)	3	0	(England) Wolverhampton Wanderers	v. Netherlands, 7 March 2026
MF	Jessica Ziu	6 June 2002 (age 24)	20	0	(England) Leicester City	v. Kazakhstan, 13 October 2026
MF	Ruesha Littlejohn	3 July 1990 (age 36)	94	6	Unattached	v. France, 9 June 2026
MF	Lily Agg ^{RET}	17 December 1993 (age 32)	22	3	Retired	v. Poland, 14 April 2026
MF	Aoibhe Brennan ^{INJ}	8 December 2007 (age 18)	0	0	(England) Manchester City	v. Poland, 14 April 2026
FW	Kelly Brady	5 March 2002 (age 24)	0	0	(Scotland) Glasgow City	v. Hungary, 29 November 2025
Notes: ^{INJ} = Withdrew due to injury; ^{RET} = Retired from national team

== Records ==
As of 13 October 2026
Players in bold are still active with the national team.

=== Most appearances ===
Rank	Player	Career	Caps	Goals
1	Emma Byrne	1997–2017	134	0
2	**Denise O'Sullivan**	2011–present	133	23
3	Louise Quinn	2008–2025	122	16
4	Áine O'Gorman	2006–2023	119	13
5	Niamh Fahey	2007–2024	115	1
6	**Katie McCabe**	2015–present	108	35
7	Ciara Grant	1995–2012	105	11
8	Diane Caldwell	2006–2024	102	4
9	**Ruesha Littlejohn**	2012–present	94	6
10	Olivia O'Toole	1991–2009	76	54

=== Top goalscorers ===
Rank	Player	Career	Goals	Caps	Avg.
1	Olivia O'Toole	1991–2009	54	76	0.71
2	**Katie McCabe**	2015–present	35	108	0.32
3	**Denise O'Sullivan**	2011–present	23	133	0.17
4	Louise Quinn	2008–2025	16	122	0.13
5	**Kyra Carusa**	2020–present	15	47	0.32
6	Stephanie Zambra	2008–2022	14	58	0.24
7	Fiona O'Sullivan	2009–2016	13	41	0.32
7	Michele O'Brien	2003–2012	13	65	0.20
7	Áine O'Gorman	2006–2023	13	119	0.11
10	Ciara Grant	1995–2012	11	105	0.10

== Competitive record ==
=== FIFA Women's World Cup ===
FIFA Women's World Cup record								Qualification record							
Year	Result	Pld	W	D	L	GF	GA	Pld	W	D	L	GF	GA	P/R	Rnk
(China) 1991	Did not qualify							4	2	1	1	6	3	–	
(Sweden) 1995	Did not enter							Did not enter							
(United States) 1999	Did not qualify							6	3	1	2	8	4	–	
(United States) 2003	Did not qualify							6	4	0	2	18	7	–	
(China) 2007	Did not qualify							8	1	1	6	3	15	–	
(Germany) 2011	Did not qualify							8	4	1	3	12	10	–	
(Canada) 2015	Did not qualify							10	5	2	3	13	9	–	
(France) 2019	Did not qualify							8	4	1	3	10	6	–	
(Australia) (New Zealand) 2023	Group Stage	3	0	1	2	1	3	9	6	2	1	27	4	–	
(Brazil) 2027	To be determined							8	5	0	3	21	9	(Note: From 2027 FIFA Women's World Cup onwards a new qualifying format was introduced, linked to the Women's Nations League where teams are divided into leagues with promotion/relegation between leagues at the end of each cycle.)	9th
(Costa Rica) (Jamaica) (Mexico) (United States) 2031	To be determined							To be determined							
(England) (Scotland) (Northern Ireland) (Wales) 2035	To be determined							To be determined							
Total	Group Stage	3	0	1	2	1	3	65	33	9	23	115	64	–	

*Draws include knockout matches decided on penalty kicks.

=== UEFA Women's Championship ===
UEFA Women's Championship record								Qualifying record							
Year	Result	Pld	W	D	L	GF	GA	Pld	W	D	L	GF	GA	P/R	Rnk
1984	Did not qualify							6	2	1	3	6	14	–	
(Norway) 1987	Did not qualify							6	2	0	4	4	17	–	
(Germany) 1989	Did not qualify							4	0	1	3	1	8	–	
(Denmark) 1991	Did not qualify							4	2	1	1	6	3	–	
(Italy) 1993	Did not qualify							4	1	0	3	1	12	–	
(Germany) 1995	Did not enter							Did not enter							
(Norway) (Sweden) 1997	Did not qualify							8	6	0	2	20	10	–	
(Germany) 2001	Did not qualify							6	2	1	3	6	12	–	
(England) 2005	Did not qualify							8	5	3	0	35	5	–	
(Finland) 2009	Did not qualify							10	4	1	5	11	18	–	
(Sweden) 2013	Did not qualify							8	3	0	5	8	11	–	
(Netherlands) 2017	Did not qualify							8	3	0	5	17	14	–	
(England) 2022	Did not qualify							8	4	1	3	11	10	–	
(Switzerland) 2025	Did not qualify							10	3	1	6	15	13	▼ (Note: From Euro 2025 onwards a new qualifying format was introduced, linked to the Women's Nations League where teams are divided into leagues with promotion/relegation between the leagues at the end of each cycle.)	15th
(Germany) 2029															
Total	–	–	–	–	–	–	–	90	37	10	43	141	147	15th	

=== UEFA Women's Nations League ===
UEFA Women's Nations League record
Season	League	Group	Pos	Pld	W	D	L	GF	GA	P/R	Rnk
2023–24	B	1	1st	6	6	0	0	20	2	▲	17th
2025	B	2	2nd	8	6	0	2	15	10	▲*	21st
Total				14	12	0	2	35	12	21st	

▲	Promoted at end of season
Same position	No movement at end of season
▼	Relegated at end of season
*	Participated in promotion/relegation play-offs

== See also ==
- Sport in Ireland
  - Football in the Republic of Ireland
    - Women's football in the Republic of Ireland
- Republic of Ireland women's national under-19 football team
- Republic of Ireland women's national under-17 football team
- Republic of Ireland men's national football team
- Northern Ireland women's national football team
