= Shelbourne F.C. (women) =

Irish association football club

- Full name: Shelbourne Football Club
- Nicknames: Shels; The Red Army
- Founded: 1971; 55 years ago (as Welsox); 1995; 31 years ago 2007 (re-founded)
- Ground: Tolka Park
- Capacity: 5,700
- Chairman: Vacant
- Manager: Sean Russell
- League: League of Ireland Women's Premier Division
- 2025: 2nd
- Website: shelbournefc.ie
Home colours	Away colours

Shelbourne Football Club is an Irish association football club based in Northside, Dublin. It currently plays in the League of Ireland Women's Premier Division. They have also fielded teams in the Dublin Women's Soccer League, the Metropolitan Girls League and the North Dublin Schoolboys/Girls League. They are the current All-Island Cup champions and FAI Women's Cup holders.

== 1990s ==
In 1995, Shelbourne F.C. took over the women's football club Welsox F.C.. Welsox played in both the Civil Service League and the Dublin Women's Soccer League and had won the FAI Women's Cup in both 1992 and 1994. They were also DWSL runners-up in 1995. After coming under the Shelbourne umbrella, they also finished as FAI Women's Cup runners-up in 1997 and 1999 and were DWSL runners-up in 1998, 1999 and 2000. Future Republic of Ireland national team manager Susan Ronan played for both Welsox and Shelbourne during this era. Following its integration into Shelbourne, the club was administered mainly, though not exclusively, by women on a voluntary basis while it received financial and logistical support from the men's club. However, in 2002, following a change in management and coaching staff, the original Shelbourne Ladies team disbanded and a core group of players moved to Templeogue United to merge with an existing girls' team.

== Revival ==
After a five-year period of inactivity, Shelbourne Women's F.C. was revived in 2007 by Mick Neville, then serving as a director of coaching at Shelbourne F.C., and former league of Ireland player, coach Stephen Craig. The club initially fielded schoolgirl teams in the North Dublin Schoolboys/girls League before also joining the Metropolitan Girls League and the Dublin Women's Soccer League.

== Women's National League ==
In 2015 Shelbourne Ladies merged with Raheny United's senior women's team. This effectively saw Shelbourne Ladies takeover Raheny United's place in the Women's National League. During the subsequent 2015–16 season, Shelbourne Ladies finished as runners-up in FAI Women's Cup, the WNL Shield and the Women's National League. All three competitions were won by Wexford Youths. However Shelbourne Ladies did win the WNL Cup after defeating UCD Waves 3–2 in the final at Richmond Park on 1 May 2016. In 2016 Shelbourne won the FAI Women's Cup after defeating Wexford Youths 5–0 in the final at the Aviva Stadium. The most notable individual performance to come out of the game was undoubtedly that of Shels' Leanne Kiernan, who scored a hat-trick and picked up the 'player of the match' award for her efforts.

The team won their first league championship when they finished the shortened 2016 season in first place. They qualified for the 2017–18 UEFA Champions League with that title. In March 2019 Shelbourne announced a number of steps intended to boost "equality and parity of esteem for all of our players". They dropped the word Ladies from the women's team's name and moved WNL home games from the AUL Complex to the main stadium at Tolka Park.

The Reds hosted the first live league game which was broadcast on TG4 from Tolka Park on 2 October 2021 with the home side beating DLR Waves 1:0 with Alex Kavanagh scoring the only goal. Shels secured their second league title weeks later on a dramatic final day of the season as Shels won 3:2 to overtake Peamount United who threw away a two goal lead to lose 2:5. They were denied the double though in the FAI Cup final by Wexford Youths.

In 2022, the side went one better by securing the double. Facing Wexford away in a winner takes all final day decider, Shels strolled to a resounding 4:0 win to retain the WNL for the first time in their history. The cup was subsequently secured with a 2:0 win over Athlone Town in front of a record FAI Women's Cup final crowd.

Shels would miss out on league success in 2023 and 2024, finishing runners-up on both occasions, but would meet Athlone Town again in both the 2023 and 2024 FAI Cup finals. Shels would lose on penalties in the 2023 final, but would exact a form of revenge to deny Athlone the double in the 2024 final with a thumping 6:1 win.

Shels beat Athlone Town 2:1 in Tolka Park in the 2025 FAI Women’s President’s Cup, the season curtain raiser.

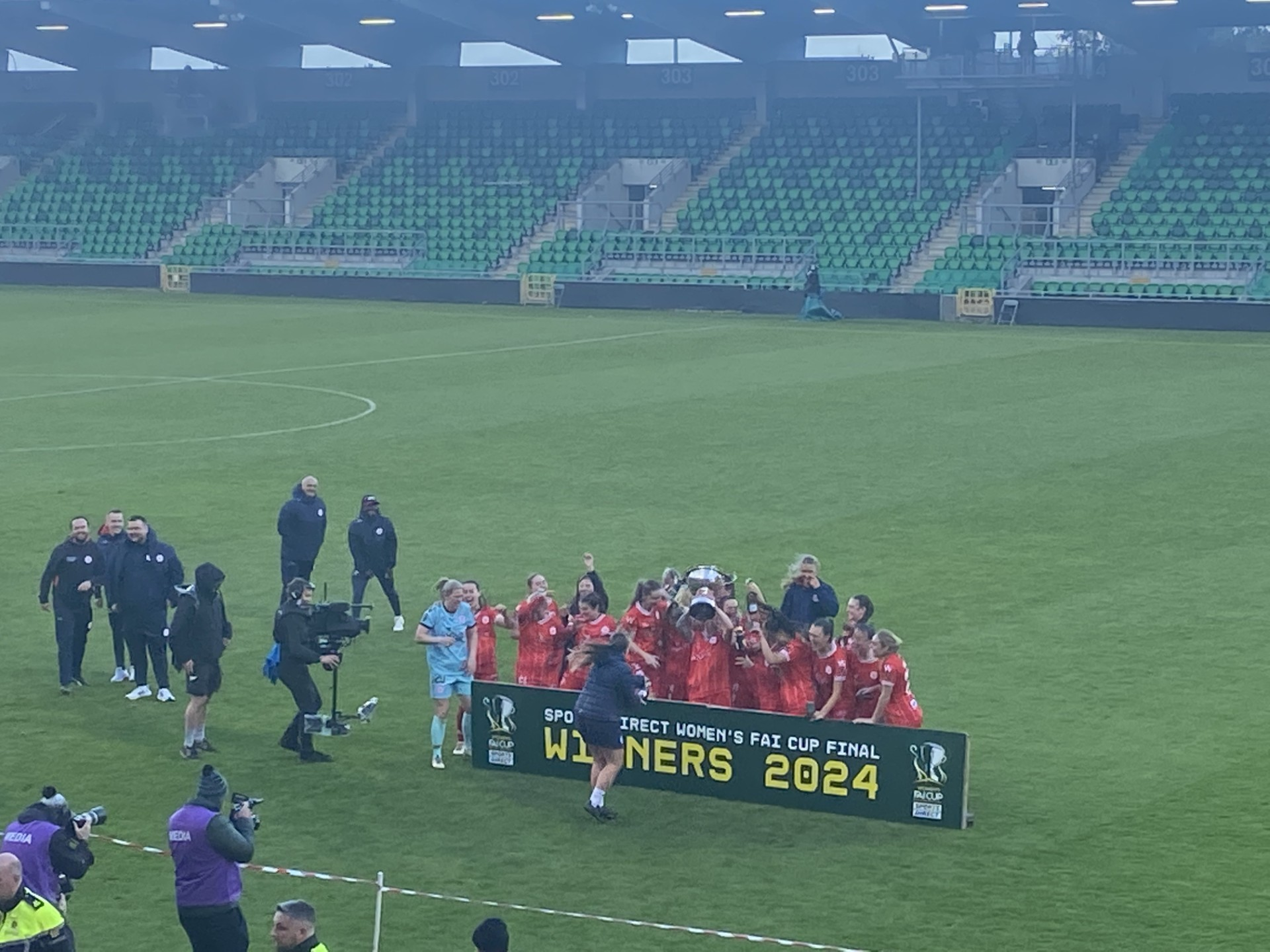
Shelbourne players celebrate their 2024 FAI Cup success at Tallaght Stadium

In 2026, Shels beat Galway United in the All-Island Cup final to secure the trophy for the first time in front of 1,368 fans. Later in the same year, the Reds added the FAI Cup for a fourth time, defeating league champions Athlone Town in the final 3:1. Shels ended the season by finishing second in the league and thereby secured a Europa Cup spot for the following season.

== Shelbourne U17/18 ==
Shelbourne Women U18 won the 2015 WFAI Intermediate Cup, defeating St Catherine's 6–0 in the final. Shelbourne Women U18 also reached the semi-finals of the 2015 FAI Women's Cup, defeating two members of the Women's National League along the way. In the last sixteen they defeated Cork City 3–2 and in the quarter-finals they won 4–0 against Castlebar Celtic. In the semi-final they lost 4–0 to the Shelbourne Women senior team.

In 2018, the under 17 side won the National League title with a 2:0 win in the final against Galway W.F.C.

== Grounds ==
Shelbourne League of Ireland Women's Premier Division team play their home games at Tolka Park. They played their home games in 2018 at AUL Complex. They formerly played at Morton Stadium from 2015 to 2017. The club's junior teams play at the AUL Complex.

== Players ==
=== Current squad ===
As of 31 January 2026

Note: Flags indicate national team as defined under FIFA eligibility rules; some limited exceptions apply. Players may hold more than one non-FIFA nationality.

No.	Pos.	Nation	Player
1	GK	USA	Mya Sanchez
2	DF	IRL	Keeva Keenan
3	DF	IRL	Nia Hannon
4	DF	IRL	Pearl Slattery (captain)
5	DF	IRL	Leah Doyle
6	MF	IRL	Alex Kavanagh
7	FW	IRL	Becky Watkins
8	DF	IRL	Rachel Graham
9	FW	IRL	Kate Mooney
15	DF	IRL	Jess Gargan
17	MF	IRL	Aoibheann Clancy

No.	Pos.	Nation	Player
18	MF	IRL	Aoife Kelly
20	GK	IRL	Jenna Willoughby
26	FW	USA	Brie Severns
28	DF	USA	Maggie Pierce
32	MF	IRL	Maddy McKinley
34	MF	IRL	Maeve Wollmer
35	MF	USA	Olivia Damico
37	MF	IRL	Caoimhe O'Brien
38	FW	IRL	Halle Harcourt
41	FW	IRL	Jade Flannery

=== Former players ===
==== Coaching staff ====
Position	Staff
Manager	Sean Russell
Goalkeeping Coach	David Burke
Assistant Manager	Rory Kirk
Sports Physiotherapist	Nicole Brindle

== Honours ==
=== Shelbourne ===
- League of Ireland Women's Premier Division
  - Winners: 2016, 2021, 2022 3
  - Runners-up: 2015–16, 2018, 2019, 2020, 2023, 2024, 2025, 2026 8
- FAI Women's Cup
  - Winners: 2016, 2022, 2024, 2026: 4
  - Runners-up: 1997, 1999, 2015, 2021, 2023: 5
- All-Island Cup
  - Winners: 2026 1
- WNL Cup
  - Winners: 2016, 2017, 2019 3
- FAI Women’s President’s Cup
  - Winners: 2025 1
- Dublin Women's Soccer League
  - Winners: 2015: 1
  - Runners-up: 1998, 1999, 2000: 3
- WNL Shield
  - Runners-up: 2015 1
  - FAI Women's Intermediate Cup
    - Winners: 2015 1
- Under 17 National League
  - Winners: 2018: 1

=== Welsox ===
- Dublin Women's Soccer League
  - Runners-up: 1995: 1
- FAI Women's Cup
  - Winners: 1992, 1994: 2

== Records ==
=== Results ===
Biggest League Win:

Home:

- 11-0 v Kilkenny United, 31 May 2017

Away:

- 10-0 v Treaty United, 2 July 2022
