= 2016 Women's National League (Ireland) =

Women's National League
- Season: 2016
- Champions: Shelbourne Ladies F.C.
- 2017–18 Champions League: Shelbourne Ladies F.C.
- Matches: 42
- Goals: 170 (4.05 per match)
- Top goalscorer: Amber Barrett (Peamount United; 16 goals)
- Biggest home win: Shelbourne 10–0 Kilkenny United (24 September 2016)
- Biggest away win: Kilkenny United 0–10 Peamount United (13 November 2016)
- All statistics correct as of 12 January 2017.

The 2016 Women's National League is the sixth season of the Women's National League, the highest women's association football league in the Republic of Ireland. It is a reduced season, running from 6 August to 4 December 2016, held prior to the introduction of single-year league seasons from 2017 onward.

On the second last matchday Shelbourne Ladies beat UCD Waves to secure their first Women's National League title.

== Teams ==

Castlebar Celtic did not return after withdrawing mid-season 2015/16.

Team	Home town/suburb	Stadium	15/16 finish
Cork City W.F.C.	Cork	Bishopstown Stadium	6th
Galway W.F.C.	Galway	Eamonn Deacy Park	4th
Kilkenny United W.F.C.	Kilkenny	Buckley Park	7th
Peamount United	Newcastle, County Dublin	Greenogue	5th
Shelbourne Ladies	Santry	Morton Stadium	2nd
UCD Waves	Dún Laoghaire–Rathdown	Jackson Park	3rd
Wexford Youths	Crossabeg	Ferrycarrig Park	1st

== Standings ==
Pos	Team	Pld	W	D	L	GF	GA	GD	Pts	Qualification
1	Shelbourne Ladies (C)	12	10	2	0	43	8	+35	32	2017–18 Champions League
2	UCD Waves	12	7	3	2	33	10	+23	24	
3	Peamount United	12	7	2	3	30	19	+11	23	
4	Wexford Youths	12	7	1	4	29	15	+14	22	
5	Galway W.F.C.	12	3	2	7	19	23	−4	11	
6	Cork City	12	3	0	9	14	26	−12	9	
7	Kilkenny United	12	0	0	12	2	69	−67	0	

(C) Champions

== Awards ==
=== Annual awards ===
Award	Winner	Club
WNL Player of the Year	Noelle Murray	Shelbourne
Young Player of the Year	Leanne Kiernan	Shelbourne

WNL Team of the Year
Goalkeeper	(Republic of Ireland) Amanda McQuillan (Shelbourne)			
Defenders	(Republic of Ireland) Jetta Berrill (UCD Waves)	(Republic of Ireland) Pearl Slattery (Shelbourne)	(Republic of Ireland) Chloe Moloney (Galway)	(Republic of Ireland) Niamh Prior (UCD Waves)
Midfielders	(Republic of Ireland) Karen Duggan (UCD Waves)	(Republic of Ireland) Roma McLaughlin (Peamount United)	(Republic of Ireland) Noelle Murray (Shelbourne)	(Republic of Ireland) Leanne Kiernan (Shelbourne)
Forwards	(Republic of Ireland) Amber Barrett (Peamount United)		(Republic of Ireland) Siobhán Killeen (Shelbourne)	
