= DLR Waves =

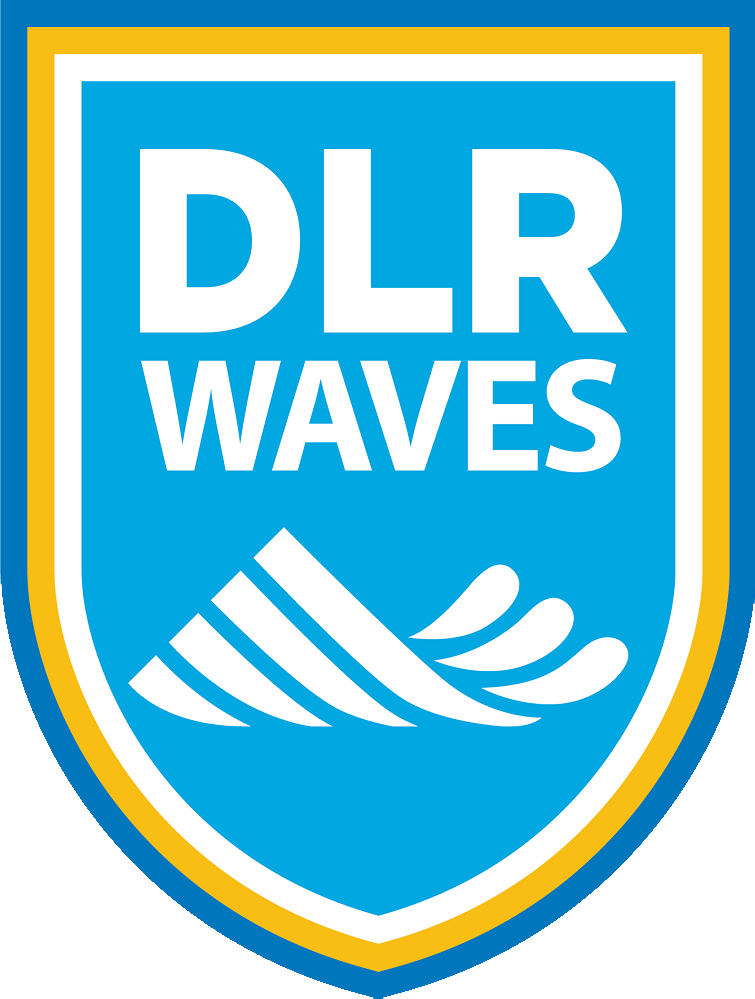
- Full name: Dún Laoghaire–Rathdown Waves
- Nickname: The Waves
- Founded: 2012; 14 years ago
- Ground: UCD Bowl
- Capacity: 3,000 (1,500 seated)
- Manager: Laura Heffernan
- League: League of Ireland Women's Premier Division
- 2025: 9th
- Website: www.dlrwaves.com
Home colours	Away colours

Dún Laoghaire–Rathdown Waves, also referred to as DLR Waves, is a women's Irish association football club based in Dún Laoghaire–Rathdown. It was originally founded in 2012. DLR Waves field several teams; the senior League of Ireland team, the Under 19s LOI team and the Under 17s LOI team. The senior 1st team competes in the FAI Women's Cup and the League of Ireland Women's Premier Division. Between 2014 and 2018, the club played as UCD Waves, before returning to the name DLR Waves.

== History ==
=== DLR Waves 2012 - 2013 ===
The 2012–13 season saw DLR Waves join the Women's National League as an expansion team. The club was formed with the support of the Dún Laoghaire–Rathdown County Council and they played their home games at Jackson Park, Kilternan. DLR Waves were managed by former UCD coach, Larry Mahony, and their squad featured former UCD captain Sylvia Gee. Initially DLR Waves had mixed success in the WNL. During the 2012–13 season they finished fifth. They were also FAI Women's Cup semi-finalists.

=== UCD Waves 2014 - 2018 ===
Between 2014 and 2018, following a merger, with UCD, the club played as UCD Waves under manager Eileen Gleeson. During this time, UCD Waves reached the FAI Women's Cup final twice, in 2014 and 2017, but lost to Raheny United and Cork City FC respectively. Furthermore, UCD Waves were runners up in the league, placed 2nd in the 2014–15 and 2016 WNL. In 2018, UCD AFC decided to withdraw from the women's league and the club ceased to be known as UCD Waves. DLR Waves was revived as a separate women's-only club using the original name, with DLR Waves replacing UCD in the Women's National League.

=== DLR Waves 2019 - Present ===
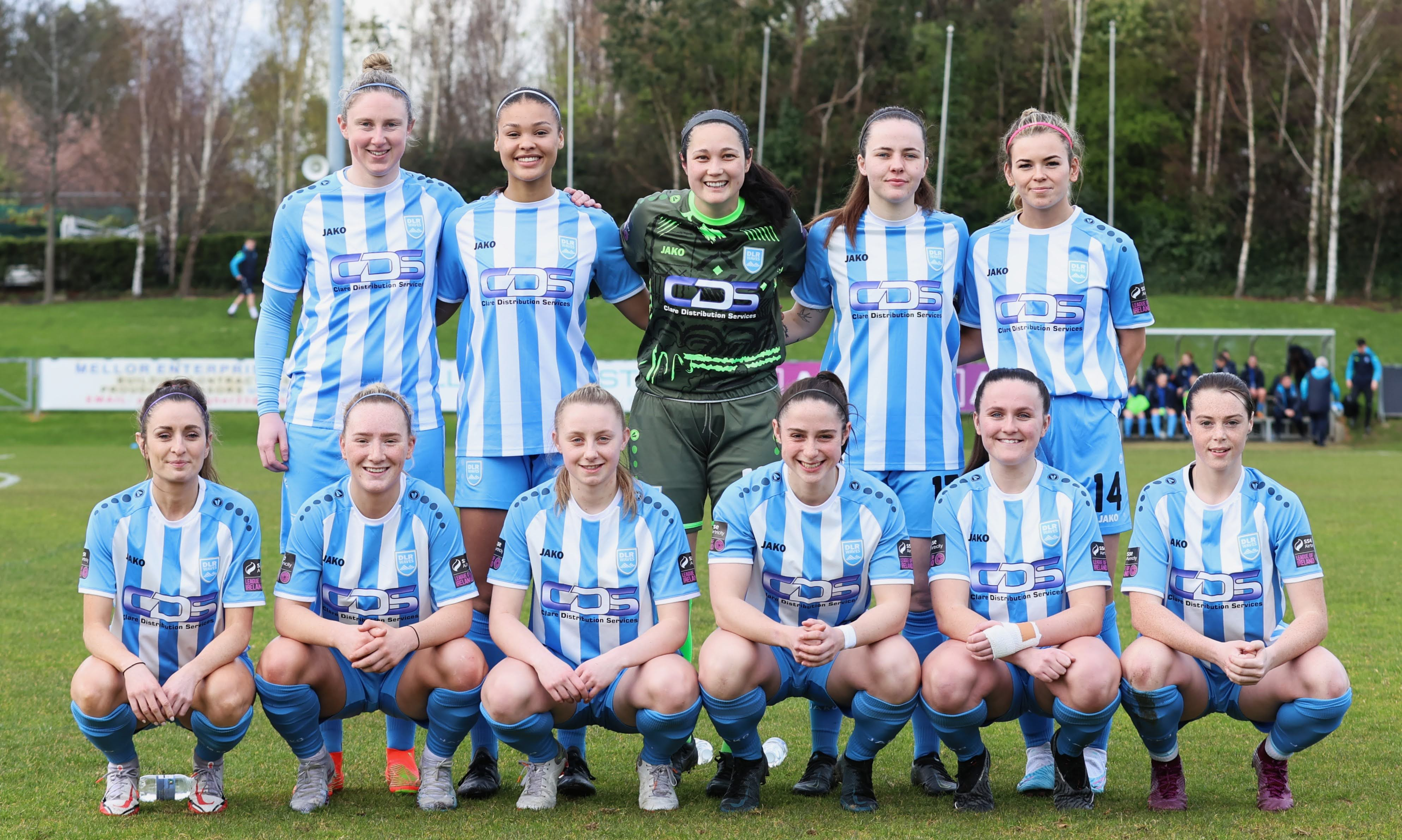
DLR Waves squad photo, April 2023

Since 2019, DLR Waves have played in the Women's National League at their home ground Jacksons Park initially, before returning to the UCD Bowl as their home ground in 2021. In recent years, DLR Waves have primarily been a mid-table team, finishing between 4th-6th in the league in the years 2019–2022. Mid-way through the 2023 season, long term manager Graham Kelly left the club for a role at St Patrick's Athletic and he was replaced by Laura Heffernan, the only female manager in the 2023 women's premier division. DLR Waves finished the 2023 season in 8th position.

In October 2023, DLR Waves launched a player academy with local clubs to provide a pathway from grassroots girls soccer into the underage DLR Waves teams. There are eight local clubs involved in the DLR Waves Partner Academy, these are; Shankill FC Girls, Enniskerry Youth Club AFC, Beechwood FC, United Girls Football Club, Park Celtic FC, Granada FC, Mount Merrion Youths FC Girls and Lakelands FC.

== Honours ==
=== Senior team ===
- Women's National League
  - Runners-up: 2014–15, 2016: 2
- FAI Women's Cup
  - Runners-up: 2014, 2017: 2

=== Under 19s Team ===
- League Title
  - Winners: 2022: 1

== Players ==
=== Current squad ===
The current squad, as of January 2026, includes:

Note: Flags indicate national team as defined under FIFA eligibility rules; some limited exceptions apply. Players may hold more than one non-FIFA nationality.

No.	Pos.	Nation	Player
1	GK	IRL	Rugile Auskalnyte
2	DF	IRL	Leah Donnelly
3	DF	IRL	Chloe McCarthy
4	DF	IRL	Hannah Tobin Jones
5	DF	IRL	Jessica Gleeson (captain)
6	DF	IRL	Keelin Dodd
7	MF	IRL	Rachel Doyle
9	FW	IRL	Aisling Meehan
10	MF	IRL	Abbie Brophy
11	DF	IRL	Kelsey McQuillan
12	DF	IRL	Bronagh Kane
13	MF	IRL	Neema Nyangasi
14	MF	IRL	Amber Cosgrove

No.	Pos.	Nation	Player
15	MF	IRL	Cliodhna Donnelly
16	DF	BUL	Michelle Muddiman
17	DF	IRL	Shauna Peare
20	FW	IRL	Michelle Doonan
21	MF	IRL	Eve Conheady
22	FW	IRL	Siún Murdiff
23	MF	IRL	Amber Cullen
24	DF	IRL	Megan Doyle
25	MF	IRL	Lauren Strong
26	MF	IRL	Nadine Raymond
27	MF	IRL	Erin Moore
40	GK	IRL	Mollie Levingston
—	DF	IRL	Aoife McDermott

=== Notable current or former players ===
A large number of current or former Irish senior international football players have played for DLR Waves at some stage in their careers, as shown in the table below.

Player	DLR Waves Years	Current Club	Senior Irish WNT Caps
Eve Badana	2019–2025	DLR Waves	4
Dearbháile Beirne	2016-2018	Peamount	1
Jetta Berrill	2014-2017, 2019, 2021	Peamount	4
Karen Duggan	2014-2017	Peamount	35
Jess Gleeson	2021–Present	DLR Waves	4
Dora Gorman	2014-2016	Peamount	16
Ciara Grant	2014-2016	Heart of Midlothian	18
Savannah McCarthy	2014-2015	Shamrock Rovers	11
Chloe Mustaki	2014-2016, 2017–2018	Bristol City Women	8
Áine O'Gorman	2014-2017	Shamrock Rovers	119
Eleanor Ryan-Doyle	2015-2016	Durham	0
Julie-Ann Russell	2014-2017	Galway United F.C.	59
Caroline Thorpe	2014-2016	Retired	24
Claire Walsh	2017	Glasgow City	4

== Coaching staff ==
=== Management team ===
As of 2024, the manager of DLR Waves is Laura Heffernan, the wider coaching team for the senior team and underage teams are listed in the table below.

Position	Name
Head Manager	(Republic of Ireland) Laura Heffernan
Assistant Manager	(Republic of Ireland) Rianna Jarrett
1st Team Coach	(Republic of Ireland) Sonya hughes
Goalkeeping Coach	(Republic of Ireland) Jack Henry
Physio	(Republic of Ireland) Emma Mulholland
Strength & Conditioning Coach	(Republic of Ireland) Laoise Traynor

=== Former managers ===
There have been five managers of DLR Waves since it was founded in 2012, as shown in the table below.

Seasons	Manager Name
2012-2013	Larry Mahony
2014-2017	Eileen Gleeson
2017-2018	Noel Kealy
2019-2023	Graham Kelly
2023–Present	Laura Heffernan

== Historic league standings ==
The historic league standings from 2012 to 2025 are summarised in the table below.

Season	League Position	Teams	Points
2012-2013	5th	7	16
2013-2014	5th	8	27
2014-2015	2nd	7	41
2015-2016	3rd	8	25
2016	2nd	7	24
2017	4th	7	27
2018	6th	8	22
2019	6th	8	16
2020	6th	9	10
2021	4th	9	39
2022	5th	10	40
2023	8th	11	13
2024	10th	11	16
2025	9th	12	18

== Supporters ==
DLR Waves has a small unofficial supporters group, established in late 2022, which attend games and decorate the ground with the club colours. Similar to most League of Ireland supporters groups, the DLR Waves fans produce stickers to promote the club throughout Dublin. The DLR Waves Supporters Logo consists of the UCD Water Tower and two women footballers. The water tower is visible from the UCD Bowl. The Dublin derby game for DLR Waves fans and players is fixtures against Bohemians F.C.
