= Maggie Pierce (soccer) =

American soccer player (born 2001)

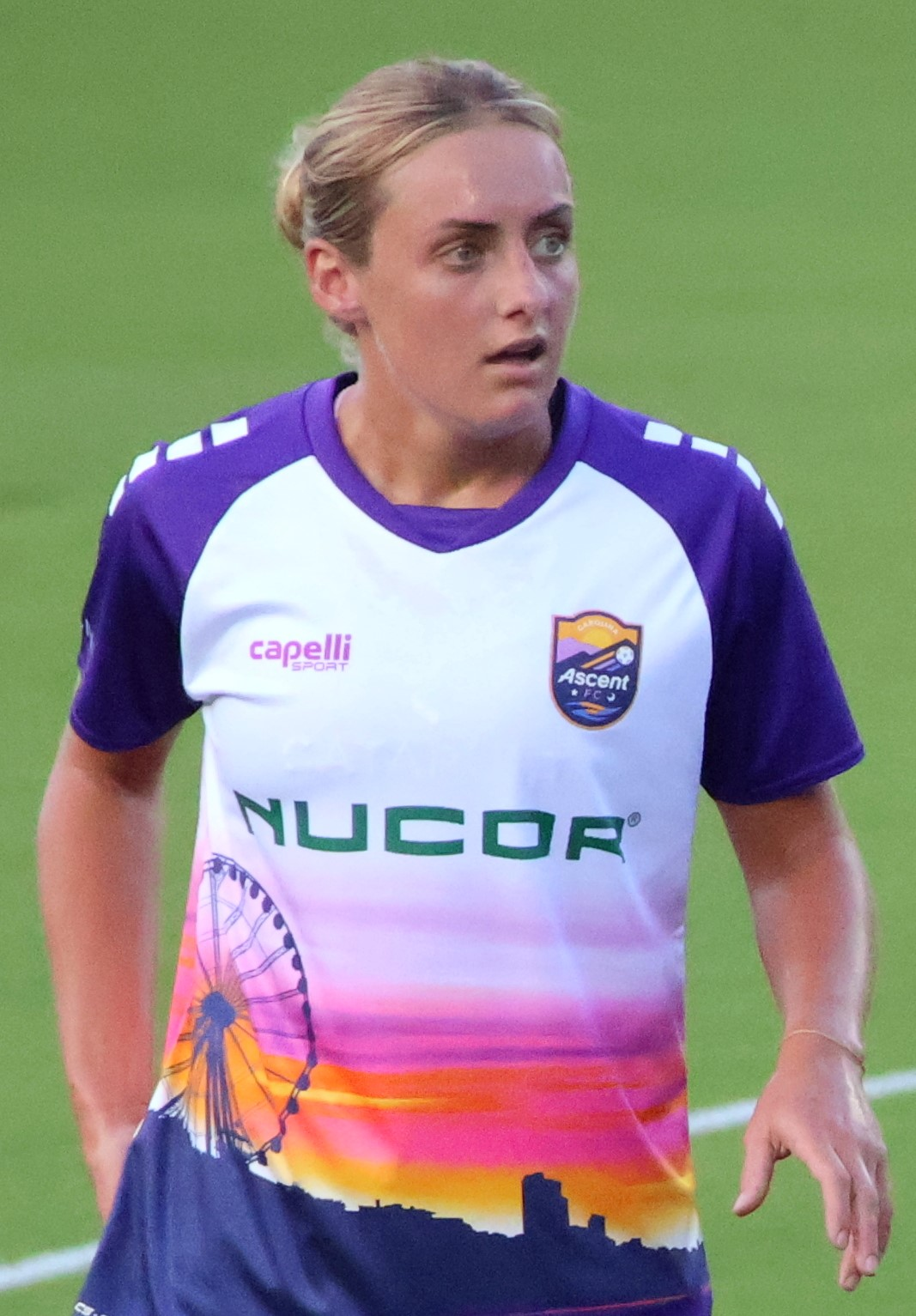
- Pierce with the Carolina Ascent in 2025

Personal information
- Full name: Margaret Julia Pierce
- Date of birth: August 10, 2001 (age 25)
- Place of birth: New York City, U.S.
- Height: 5 ft 4 in (1.63 m)
- Positions: Midfielder; defender

Team information
- Current team: Shelbourne
- Number: 28

Youth career
- 2015–2016: Cardinal Gibbons Crusaders
- 2017–2018: North Carolina Courage

College career
Years	Team	Apps	(Gls)
2019–2022	North Carolina Tar Heels	80	(1)

Senior career*
Years	Team	Apps	(Gls)
2016	Oak City United		
2023–2024	Shelbourne	40	(2)
2025	Carolina Ascent (USL W)	6	(0)
2025	Carolina Ascent	1	(0)
2026–	Shelbourne	6	(0)

International career
2017	United States U-17	1	(0)
- * Club domestic league appearances and goals as of 15:41, December 23, 2025 (UTC)

Margaret Julia Pierce (born August 10, 2001) is an American professional soccer player who plays as a midfielder or defender for Irish Women's Premier Division club Shelbourne. She played college soccer for the North Carolina Tar Heels.

== Early life ==
Pierce was born in New York City as one of three daughters to Scott and Jennifer Pierce. She grew up in Cary, North Carolina, and attended Cardinal Gibbons High School and Crossroads Flex High School. She announced her verbal commitment to the University of North Carolina at age 14. In two seasons at Cardinal Gibbons, she scored 31 goals in 34 games, earned all-state and All-American honors, and helped the team to the state title game in 2017. She also ran track in high school.

Pierce played club soccer for the North Carolina Courage Academy (previously CASL) in the Elite Clubs National League and the Girls' Development Academy. She also played for Oak City United in the Women's Premier Soccer League. TopDrawerSoccer ranked Pierce as the 35th-best prospect of the 2019 class.

== College career ==
Pierce played in 80 games for the North Carolina Tar Heels. In her freshman year in 2019, she helped the team win the ACC tournament and advance to the NCAA tournament title game, playing 24 minutes vs. Stanford. During her sophomore year in 2020, she sustained an anterior cruciate ligament injury in the ACC tournament final against Florida State, forcing her to sit out the spring portion of the pandemic-delayed season. Upon return from injury, she played in every match in her junior season in 2021, scoring the overtime game winner against Boston College. In her senior year in 2022, she played in every match with 13 starts and again helped the Tar Heels to the NCAA tournament title game, playing 37 minutes vs. UCLA.

== Club career ==
=== Shelbourne ===
North Carolina Tar Heels assistant coach Heather O'Reilly, whose final professional stop was with Shelbourne, recommended that Pierce pursue the Irish Premier League club after college. Pierce joined the Irish title holders as a defender and center midfielder for the 2023 season. On March 4, she started on the opening matchday and saved a shot off the goal line as Shelbourne defeated Cork City. Her first professional goal came during a 4–1 win over Peamount United.

In September, she played in both of Shelbourne's games in the 2023–24 UEFA Women's Champions League qualifying rounds. She appeared in every game for the club in all competitions in 2023, playing 97% of the available minutes. She was named in the Women's Premier Division Team of the Season, named the League of Ireland team Best Newcomer, and named to the League of Ireland Team of the Week twice. Her contributions helped the club limit league opponents to 13 goals in 20 games, and her teammates voted her the 1895 Player of the Year.

Pierce re-signed with Shelbourne for the 2024 season. On September 7, she scored in a 4-2 win against Treaty United to keep Shelbourne at the top of the standings. On October 20, she played every minute and raised her first professional trophy when Shelbourne won the 2024 FAI Women's Cup, defeating Athlone Town by 6–1 in the final. Pierce was again named to the Premier League of Ireland Team of the Year. She was also named to the LOI Team of the Week 5 times, and nominated for the league Player of the Year. Her teammates voted her the club's Player of the Year, while manager Eoin Wearen praised her "energy, selflessness, versatility, and ability on the ball".

=== Carolina Ascent ===
USL Super League club Carolina Ascent announced on July 15, 2025, that Pierce had signed with the club, returning to her home state. She had made six appearances that summer for the Ascent's USL W League side. Pierce made her Super League debut on October 30, 2025, coming on as a substitute in a 2–1 victory over the Spokane Zephyr.

=== Return to Shelbourne ===
On December 23, 2025, Pierce announced that should would return to Shelbourne for her third professional season in 2026. She again took on a starting role as a defender and central midfielder, and raised her second cup playing every minute in the Shelbourne victory in the Avenir Sports All Island Cup (a competition featuring teams from the League of Ireland Premier League and the Premier League of Northern Ireland).

She also started and played the entire match as Shelbourne hosted her former college team, UNC, in a friendly at Tolka Park in Dublin.

== International career ==
Pierce trained with the United States under-17 team in 2017, appearing in a friendly against England.

== Honors and awards ==
North Carolina Tar Heels

- NCAA tournament runner-up: 2019, 2022
- Atlantic Coast Conference: 2019, 2022; runner-up: 2020
- ACC tournament: 2019; runner-up: 2020, 2022

Shelbourne

- League of Ireland Women's Premier Division runner-up: 2023, 2024
- FAI Women's Cup: 2024; runner-up: 2023
- All-Island Cup: 2026

Individual

- League of Ireland Women's Premier Division Team of the Season: 2023, 2024
- Shelbourne Player of the Year: 2023 (the 1895), 2024 (Players)
