= Savannah McCarthy =

Irish footballer

Personal information
- Date of birth: 26 March 1997 (age 29)
- Place of birth: Tralee, County Kerry, Ireland
- Position: Defender

Team information
- Current team: Shamrock Rovers
- Number: 3

Youth career
- Listowel Celtic

Senior career*
Years	Team	Apps	(Gls)
2014–2015	UCD Waves		
2015–2016	Galway		
2016–2017	Glasgow City		
2018–2019	Cork City	22	(3)
2020–2023	Galway	39	(1)
2023–2024	Shamrock Rovers	23	(1)

International career^{‡}
2012–2013	Republic of Ireland U17	11	(1)
2014–2016	Republic of Ireland U19	15	(3)
2016–	Republic of Ireland	10	(0)
- * Club domestic league appearances and goals ‡ National team caps and goals as of 22 February 2022

Savannah McCarthy (born 26 March 1997) is an Irish football defender who plays for Shamrock Rovers of the Women's National League (WNL) and the Republic of Ireland. She previously played for UCD Waves and Cork City of the WNL, as well as for Glasgow City of the Scottish Women's Premier League (SWPL). She is a powerful centre back who can also play in midfield.

== Early life ==
McCarthy played soccer for Listowel Celtic in the early stages of her career, after joining the club when she was seven years old. She also played Gaelic football for Kerry up to minor level, before deciding to focus on soccer.

== Club career ==
McCarthy signed for UCD Waves in August 2014 and made her first Women's National League (WNL) appearances for the club in 2014–15. After one season she joined Galway WFC, partly to cut down on travelling.

In February 2016 McCarthy accepted the offer of a professional contract with Scottish UEFA Women's Champions League contestants Glasgow City. The presence of some Irish international teammates helped her to feel settled in her new surroundings. In November 2017 she helped Glasgow City secure their 11th successive Scottish Women's Premier League title.

In March 2018 McCarthy returned to the Women's National League with Cork City. On her debut for Cork she scored a "long-range looping strike" in a 2–0 win at her former club Galway. She was Cork's Player of the Season in 2018 but a missed much of 2019 due to injury. In May 2020 she signed for Galway again.

In January 2023 McCarthy signed for Shamrock Rovers ahead of the club's return to the Women's National League.

== International career ==
=== Youth ===
McCarthy was an important defender in the Republic of Ireland women's national under-19 football team which qualified for the UEFA Women's Under-19 Championship finals for the first time in 2014. She scored against England and Sweden as Ireland negotiated the group stage. They lost 4–0 to the Netherlands in the semi-final, for whom Vivianne Miedema scored a hat-trick.

=== Senior ===
On 5 May 2014, Republic of Ireland women's national football team manager Susan Ronan named McCarthy in an experimental squad for a friendly against the Basque Country. She appeared as a substitute for Ciara McCormack in Ireland's 2–0 defeat in Azpeitia, which was not classified as a full international fixture.

McCarthy was called up again for a UEFA Women's Euro 2017 qualifying fixture against Spain in November 2015. Coach Ronan said: "It will be a good experience for Savannah, who is still with the U19 squad and an opportunity for her to see at first hand what is required at senior international level." She was picked for a trip to the United States in January 2016, remaining an unused substitute in Ireland's 5–0 defeat by the senior United States team but starting a 3–0 defeat by the hosts' national under-23 team two days later.

She won her first senior cap at the 2016 Cyprus Cup, as an 86th-minute substitute for Megan Campbell in the opening 2–0 defeat by Austria. She then started the 1–1 draw with Italy and the 1–0 defeat by Hungary. In June 2016 she made a competitive appearance, starting Ireland's record-equalling 9–0 win over Montenegro. McCarthy played the second half of a 2–1 home friendly win over the Basque Country on 25 November 2016, coming in for Jetta Berrill at half-time. When Susan Ronan stood down and was replaced by Colin Bell in February 2017, McCarthy was named in his first squad for the 2017 Cyprus Cup.

In September 2021 McCarthy was recalled to the national team by Vera Pauw. Pauw was impressed by McCarthy's renewed dedication and her ability to play on the left of a back three. A promising performance in Ireland's 3–2 friendly win over Australia on 21 September 2021 at Tallaght Stadium was McCarthy's first cap for five years. She retained her place for 2023 FIFA Women's World Cup qualification – UEFA Group A fixtures against Sweden, Finland and Slovakia, before being ruled out by an anterior cruciate ligament injury in March 2022.

== Personal life ==
McCarthy is an Irish Traveller. She was presented with a Traveller Pride Award by her hero Katie Taylor in May 2013.

McCarthy was involved in a Car accident in 2024, she was pulled from a burning car that she was behind the wheel of and was said to be lucky to be alive a month prior she was banned from driving for 4 years for driving without insurance and a license. In November 2025 she successfully appealed the ban.
