= Jessica Gleeson =

Irish footballer

Jess Gleeson
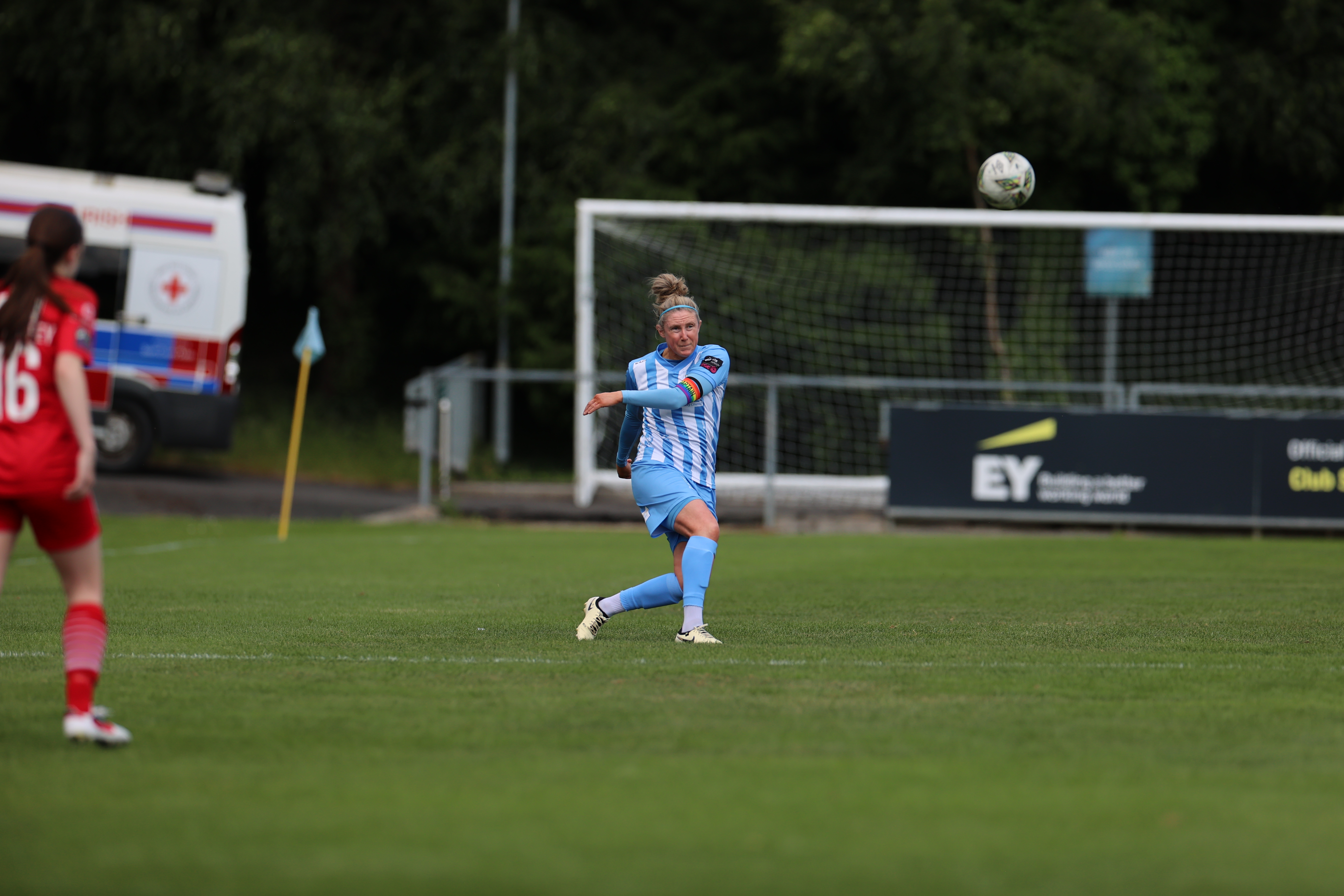
- Jess Gleeson in action for DLR Waves

Personal information
- Full name: Jessica Gleeson
- Date of birth: 23 October 1993 (age 33)
- Place of birth: Waterford, Ireland
- Height: 1.76 m (5 ft 9 in)
- Position: Defender

Team information
- Current team: DLR Waves
- Number: 5

Youth career
- Villa AFC
- Tramore AFC

Senior career*
Years	Team	Apps	(Gls)
2011–2017	Wexford Youths		
2018–2020	Shelbourne	40	(2)
2021–	DLR Waves	98	(5)

International career^{‡}
2009–2010	Republic of Ireland U17	8	(1)
2011–2012	Republic of Ireland U19	4	(0)
2015–	Republic of Ireland	4	(0)
- * Club domestic league appearances and goals ‡ National team caps and goals as of 12 April 2016

Jessica Gleeson (born 23 October 1993) is an Irish footballer who plays as a defender for Women's National League club DLR Waves. She previously played for Wexford Youths and Shelbourne. Since making her debut in 2015 she has been a member of the Republic of Ireland women's national team. Her younger brother Austin Gleeson has represented the Waterford county hurling team.

== Club career ==
Gleeson was born in Waterford and played youth soccer for local clubs Villa AFC and Tramore AFC. She joined Wexford Youths for the inaugural Women's National League (WNL) season in 2011–12. In 2014–15 Wexford Youths won the WNL for the first time, and Gleeson represented the club in the 2015–16 UEFA Women's Champions League.

Ahead of the 2018 WNL season, Gleeson accepted an offer to join Wexford Youths' WNL rivals Shelbourne FC. She had considered moving a year earlier, but decided to spend one more season at Wexford out of loyalty to the team's coach. Gleeson considered quitting soccer in favour of Gaelic football after losing her place in the Shelbourne team during the 2020 season, but she was persuaded to join DLR Waves instead.

Gleeson made her DLR Waves debut at the beginning of the 2021 Women's National League season. Following a successful first year at the club she was appointed club captain ahead of the 2022 season. As of 2024 she is still with DLR Waves and remains the club captain.

== International career ==
=== Youth ===
In 2010, Gleeson was a key player in the Republic of Ireland U-17 squad who were runners-up in the 2010 UEFA Women's Under-17 Championship and quarter-finalists in the 2010 FIFA U-17 Women's World Cup.

While enrolled at Waterford Institute of Technology, Gleeson represented Ireland at the 2013 and 2015 Summer Universiades.

=== Senior ===
Gleeson received her first Republic of Ireland national team call-up for the 2013 Cyprus Cup. In May 2015, Gleeson was called up to the senior national team again for a friendly in the United States. After the match had been arranged, it was discovered to be outside FIFA's designated dates for international matches, so several of Ireland's first-choice players were not released by their clubs. Gleeson started Ireland's 3–0 defeat to win a debut cap, but was substituted at half time after being concussed by Abby Wambach.

Eight months later Gleeson collected a second cap, making a substitute appearance in another friendly defeat by the United States in San Diego. She retained her place in the squad for the 2016 Cyprus Cup and played in the opening 2–0 defeat by Austria, before succumbing to a foot injury which ruled her out of the remaining fixtures. On 12 April 2016 she made a competitive appearance as a 68th-minute substitute for Niamh Fahey in Ireland's 3–0 UEFA Women's Euro 2017 qualifying defeat by Spain at La Ciudad del Fútbol, Las Rozas de Madrid.
