= Eve Badana =

Irish footballer (born 1993)

Personal information
- Full name: Eve Martha Badana
- Date of birth: 9 July 1993 (age 33)
- Place of birth: Markham, Ontario, Canada
- Height: 5 ft 8 in (1.73 m)
- Position: Goalkeeper

Team information
- Current team: DLR Waves
- Number: 18

Youth career
- Unionville Milliken SC
- Toronto Lady Lynx

College career
Years	Team	Apps	(Gls)
2011–2015	Drexel Dragons	67	(0)

Senior career*
Years	Team	Apps	(Gls)
2016–2018	Cork City		
2019–	DLR Waves		

International career^{‡}
2012–	Republic of Ireland	4	(0)
- * Club domestic league appearances and goals as of 23:58, 18 September 2021 (UTC) ‡ National team caps and goals as of 22 February 2022

Eve Martha Badana (born 9 July 1993) is a footballer who plays as a goalkeeper for Irish Women's National League club DLR Waves. She previously played for Cork City while attending University College Cork.

Born and raised in Canada to a Filipino father and a Northern Irish mother, Badana has represented Canada and the Republic of Ireland at under-17 and senior levels, respectively. She won her first cap for Ireland in February 2012.

== Early life ==
Badana's mother is from County Tyrone, Northern Ireland, and emigrated to Ontario after studying in Belfast. There she met Badana's Filipino father. Badana has one brother and one sister.

== Club career ==
Badana was captain of her local team Unionville Milliken SC, then joined Toronto Lady Lynx where she was also named captain and helped the Under-20 team qualify for the 2010 Super Y-League finals. In 2011, she agreed a scholarship to Drexel University. Badana's first season in college soccer saw her named in the Colonial Athletic Association (CAA) All-Rookie team and also the All-Conference Second Team.

On 27 September 2016 Badana signed for Cork City, after she decided to relocate to Ireland and finish her legal studies at University College Cork. At Cork City she competed for a starting position with Amanda Budden. Badana then accepted a job with a legal firm in Dublin and signed for DLR Waves during the 2019 Women's National League season.

== International career ==
=== Youth ===
While a pupil at Brother André Catholic High School in her native Markham, Badana attended the National Training Centre in Ontario. She came to the attention of Canada women's national soccer team selectors who drafted her into the national Under-17 squad. Badana was then part of the Canadian selection at the 2010 FIFA U-17 Women's World Cup.

=== Senior ===
Eligible due to her County Tyrone-born mother, Badana approached the Football Association of Ireland about switching her international affiliation, rather than the Irish Football Association, whose national team usually represents footballers with ancestry or parentage from Northern Ireland and also entitled to Irish citizenship. In September 2011 she was called-up to the Republic of Ireland women's national football team for their UEFA Women's Euro 2013 qualifying games against Wales and France. On her senior international debut in February 2012, Badana played 90 minutes of Ireland's 1–0 Algarve Cup defeat by Hungary.

In May 2012 Badana won another senior cap in a 1–0 friendly defeat by Switzerland at Stadion Niedermatten and made a substitute appearance in a 1–0 win over South Africa at the 2013 Cyprus Cup. On 5 May 2014, Ireland manager Susan Ronan named Badana in an experimental squad for a friendly against the Basque Country. Badana started the game in Ireland's 2–0 defeat in Azpeitia, which was not classified as a full international fixture.

She remained an understudy, usually to the recognised first-choice goalkeeper Emma Byrne. Following the international retirement of Niamh Reid Burke in March 2021, Badana was called up to train with Ireland coach Vera Pauw's squad for two friendlies against Denmark and Belgium. She returned to the squad in June 2021 for two friendlies against Iceland, but still had only three caps following her debut almost a decade earlier.

Badana also represented Ireland at the 2013, 2015 and 2017 editions of the Summer Universiade.

=== International Appearances ===
Appearances by national team and year
National team	Year	Apps
Republic of Ireland	2012	2
Republic of Ireland	2013	1
Republic of Ireland	2022	1
Total		4
