= Laura Heffernan =

Irish football manager

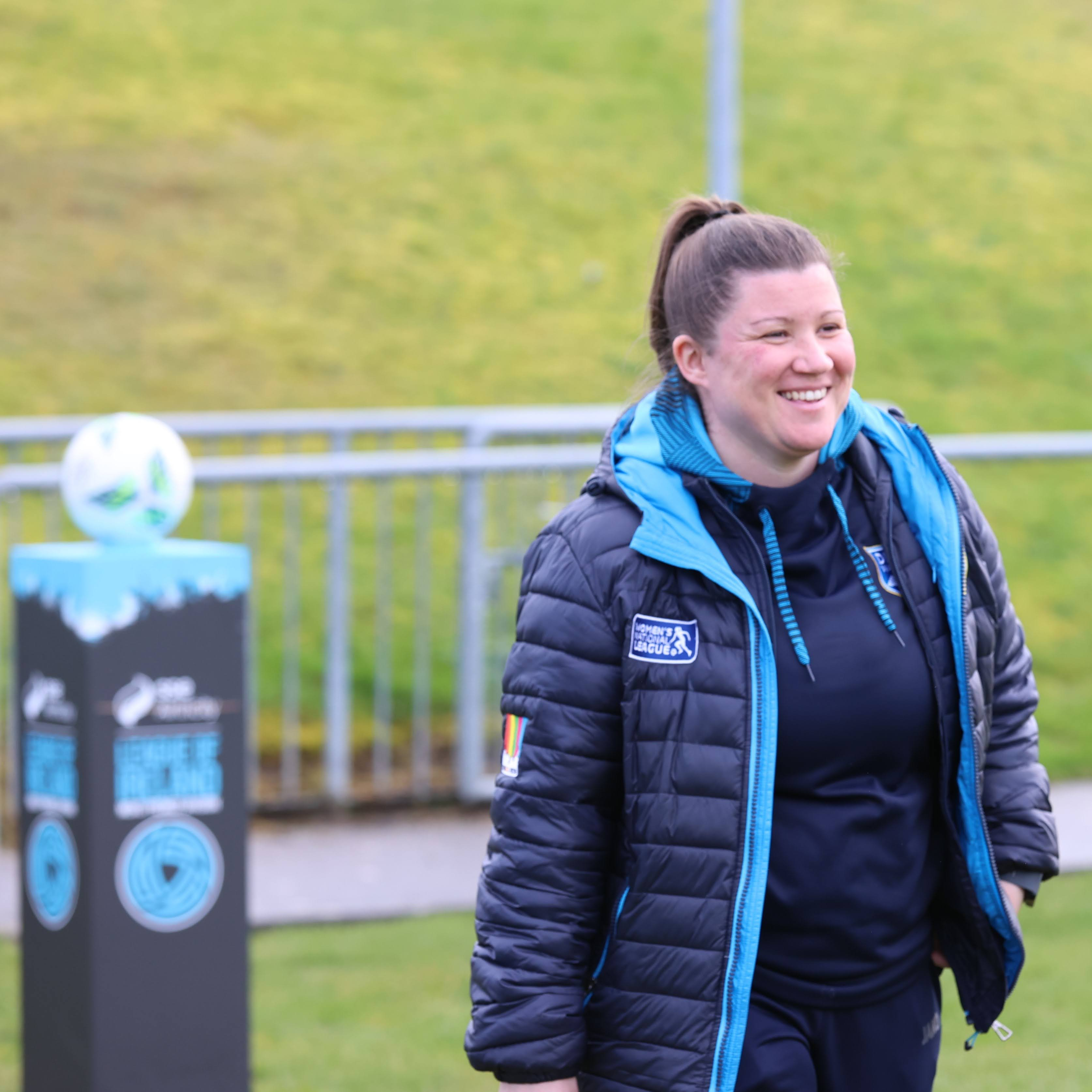

Managerial career
- Years: Team
- 2017: Wexford Youths W.F.C.
- 2018–2021: Shelbourne F.C. (women) U17
- 2021–2022: DLR Waves U19
- 2023: DLR Waves (assistant manager)
- 2023–: DLR Waves

Laura Heffernan is an Irish football manager. As of 2023, she is manager of Irish football team DLR Waves.

== Playing career ==
As a footballer active between 1996 and 2014, Laura Heffernan played for a number of clubs, including Wexford Youths W.F.C., Curracloe United, North End United, Enniscorthy United and Wexford Celtic.

== Management career ==
Heffernan was the head coach of Wexford Youths W.F.C. in 2017, winning the Women's National League (Ireland) title. From 2018-2021, she was the head coach for the Shelbourne F.C. (women) under 17s team, winning the 2018 league title. She was also an assistant manager for the Shelbourne WNL Senior Team. In 2021, she became DLR Waves under 19s manager, with the youth team winning the league title in 2022. At the start of the 2023 League of Ireland Premier Division season, Heffernan was appointed assistant manager to the DLR Waves senior team. In May 2023, DLR Waves manager Graham Kelly left the club and Heffernan became the manager of DLR Waves. Heffernan is the only female manager in the 2023 Women's Premier Division. Heffernan is also training to achieve an UEFA Pro Licence, making her the 3rd Irish woman to take part in this course with the Football Association of Ireland.

== Honours ==
=== As a manager ===
- League of Ireland Women's Premier Division: 1 League Title
  - Wexford Youths W.F.C. – 2017
- League of Ireland U17 Division: 1 League Title
  - Shelbourne F.C. U17s - 2018
- League of Ireland U19 Division: 1 League Title
  - DLR Waves U19s - 2022
