= Eleanor Ryan-Doyle =

Irish footballer (born 1998)

Personal information
- Full name: Eleanor Sarah Ryan-Doyle
- Date of birth: 14 May 1998 (age 28)
- Place of birth: Dublin, Ireland
- Position: Forward

Team information
- Current team: Peamount United
- Number: 10

Youth career
- Beech Park
- Peamount United

Senior career*
Years	Team	Apps	(Gls)
2014	Peamount United		
2015–2016	UCD Waves		(11)
2017–2021	Peamount United		(42)
2021–2022	Birmingham City	14	(0)
2023	→ Coventry United (loan)	4	(2)
2023–2025	Durham	27	(3)
2025–	Peamount United	15	(8)

International career^{‡}
2013–2015	Republic of Ireland U17	4	(1)
- * Club domestic league appearances and goals as of 30 January 2025 ‡ National team caps and goals as of 21:25, 19 March 2023 (UTC)

Eleanor Sarah Ryan-Doyle (born 14 May 1998) is an Irish professional footballer who plays as a forward for Peamount United of the Women's National League (WNL).

== Club career ==
Ryan-Doyle is from Lucan, Dublin and she started playing in the youth system of Peamount United when she was eight years old. She was a 13-year-old ball girl when Peamount played a 2011–12 UEFA Women's Champions League tie against Paris Saint-Germain Féminine at Tallaght Stadium.

She made her first team debut in 2014–15, and struck 11 goals in her first season. After joining an exodus of players moving from Peamount to UCD Waves in 2015, Ryan-Doyle returned to Peamount in February 2017.

Ryan-Doyle enjoyed good form in the 2019 Women's National League, being named WNL Player of the Month for June 2019 and named in the Team of the Season. She scored four goals as "The Peas" secured the 2019 Women's National League title with an 8–1 win over Cork City. She also played in Peamount's 2018 and 2019 FAI Women's Cup final defeats by Wexford Youths.

Ryan-Doyle helped Peamount United secure a League and Cup "double" in their 2020 campaign. She also featured in Peamount's November 2020 UEFA Women's Champions League (UWCL) fixture with Scottish Women's Premier League club Glasgow City, which was lost on penalties after a 0–0 draw. In August 2021, Peamount travelled to FC Twente in the UWCL where Ryan-Doyle scored a brace in their 5–2 loss to ŽFK Spartak Subotica.

In September 2021 Ryan-Doyle signed a one-year professional contract with FA WSL club Birmingham City. She scored her first goals for Birmingham on 15 December 2021, scoring twice in eight minutes to secure a 2–2 draw with London City Lionesses in the 2021–22 FA Women's League Cup. In July 2022 Ryan-Doyle agreed to extend her contract with relegated Birmingham for another year, with the option of a further year. After losing her place in Birmingham's team she joined Coventry United on loan in January 2023 for the rest of the 2022–23 season.

On 4 July 2023, it was announced that Ryan-Doyle had signed for Durham. She scored for Durham in each of their Women's League Cup group stage matches during the 2024–25 season. On 26 June 2025, it was announced that she was departing the club upon the expiry of her contract.

== International career ==
=== Youth ===
Ryan-Doyle represented Ireland at schoolgirl level while she attended St. Joseph's College, Lucan. She represented the Republic of Ireland women's national under-17 football team in the 2015 UEFA Women's Under-17 Championship in Iceland.

While enrolled at Technological University Dublin, Ryan-Doyle represented Ireland at the 2019 Summer Universiade, scoring five goals as Ireland reached the semi-final. She had also been part of the Irish squad at the 2017 edition in Taiwan.

=== Senior ===
In August 2019 Ryan-Doyle was included in the senior national team squad for a 3–0 friendly defeat by the United States at the Rose Bowl in Pasadena, California, under interim manager Tom O'Connor. She retained her squad place for the opening UEFA Women's Euro 2022 qualifier against Montenegro, a 2–0 win at Tallaght Stadium on 3 September 2019.

Thereafter Ryan-Doyle was absent from squads named by incoming coach Vera Pauw, although she continued to attend training sessions for Irish-based national team players.
