= 2019 Women's National League (Ireland) =

Women's National League
- Season: 2019
- Dates: 9 March 2019 – 10 November 2019
- Champions: Peamount United
- Matches: 84
- Goals: 399 (4.75 per match)
- Top goalscorer: Rianna Jarrett (26)
- Biggest home win: Peamount United 9–0 Kilkenny United (22 June 2019)
- Biggest away win: Kilkenny United 2–12 Peamount United (22 September 2019)
- Highest scoring: Kilkenny United 2–12 Peamount United (22 September 2019)

The 2019 Women's National League, known for sponsorship reasons as the Só Hotels Women's National League, was the ninth season of the Women's National League, the highest women's association football league in the Republic of Ireland. It began on 9 March 2019 and concluded on 10 November 2019. Wexford Youths were the defending champions, but Peamount United won to secure their first League title since the inaugural 2011–12 season.

== Teams ==

| Team | Home town/suburb | Stadium | 2018 finish |
|---|---|---|---|
| Cork City | Cork | Bishopstown Stadium | 5th |
| Galway | Galway | Eamonn Deacy Park | 4th |
| Kilkenny United | Kilkenny | Buckley Park | 8th |
| Limerick | Limerick | Markets Field | 7th |
| Peamount United | Newcastle, County Dublin | Greenogue | 3rd |
| Shelbourne | Drumcondra, Dublin | Tolka Park | 2nd |
| DLR Waves | Dún Laoghaire | Jackson Park | 6th (UCD Waves) |
| Wexford Youths | Crossabeg | Ferrycarrig Park | 1st |

=== Personnel and kits ===
Note: Flags indicate national team as has been defined under FIFA eligibility rules. Players may hold more than one non-FIFA nationality.

| Team | Manager | Captain | Kit manufacturer | Shirt sponsor |
|---|---|---|---|---|
| Cork City | (Republic of Ireland) Frank Kelleher | (Republic of Ireland) Katie McCarthy | Adidas | Clonakilty Food Company |
| DLR Waves | (Republic of Ireland) Graham Kavanagh | | Jako | Eversheds Sutherland |
| Galway | (Republic of Ireland) Billy Clery | (Republic of Ireland) Keara Cormican | Uhlsport | Lough Rea Hotel and Spa |
| Kilkenny United | (Republic of Ireland) James Dermody | (Republic of Ireland) Bronagh Kane | Errea | |
| Limerick | (Republic of Ireland) Dave Rooney | | Umbro | |
| Peamount United | (Republic of Ireland) James O'Callaghan | (Republic of Ireland) Áine O'Gorman | O'Neills | Texaco Newcastle Service Station |
| Shelbourne | (England) Dave Bell | (Republic of Ireland) Pearl Slattery | Umbro | Dublin City University |
| Wexford Youths | (England) Tom Elmes | (Republic of Ireland) Kylie Murphy | Bodibro | Energia |

== Format ==
Teams played each other three times, either twice at home and once away, or once at home and twice away. Each team played 21 games, either 10 home and 11 away, or 11 home and 10 away.

== League table ==
| Pos | Team | Pld | W | D | L | GF | GA | GD | Pts | Qualification |
|---|---|---|---|---|---|---|---|---|---|---|
| 1 | Peamount United | 21 | 18 | 2 | 1 | 93 | 13 | +80 | 56 | 2020–21 Champions League |
| 2 | Shelbourne | 21 | 17 | 3 | 1 | 83 | 16 | +67 | 54 | |
| 3 | Wexford Youths | 21 | 13 | 3 | 5 | 70 | 22 | +48 | 42 | |
| 4 | Galway | 21 | 11 | 4 | 6 | 56 | 37 | +19 | 37 | |
| 5 | Cork City | 21 | 7 | 3 | 11 | 39 | 55 | −16 | 24 | |
| 6 | DLR Waves | 21 | 5 | 1 | 15 | 18 | 64 | −46 | 16 | |
| 7 | Limerick | 21 | 4 | 0 | 17 | 26 | 84 | −58 | 12 | |
| 8 | Kilkenny United | 21 | 0 | 2 | 19 | 14 | 108 | −94 | 2 | |

Source: Extratime.com

== Results ==
=== Matches 1–14 ===
Teams played each other twice (once at home, once away).

| Home \ Away | COR | GAL | PEA | KIL | LIM | SHE | DLR | WEX |
|---|---|---|---|---|---|---|---|---|
| Cork City | — | 3–5 | 0–3 | 7–1 | 3–0 | 2–7 | 3–4 | 0–3 |
| Galway | 4–1 | — | 1–2 | 3–2 | 3–0 | 0–3 | 3–0 | 2–6 |
| Peamount United | 2–1 | 3–2 | — | 9–0 | 7–0 | 2–0 | 5–0 | 2–1 |
| Kilkenny United | 0–3 | 0–3 | 0–7 | — | 0–1 | 1–10 | 0–1 | 1–4 |
| Limerick | 0–1 | 3–6 | 0–4 | 4–1 | — | 0–5 | 3–2 | 1–6 |
| Shelbourne | 5–0 | 1–1 | 1–1 | 8–1 | 5–0 | — | 5–0 | 0–0 |
| DLR Waves | 0–3 | 1–2 | 0–7 | 2–0 | 1–0 | 0–4 | — | 0–3 |
| Wexford Youths | 2–1 | 2–1 | 0–1 | 2–0 | 7–0 | 1–2 | 3–0 | — |

Updated to match(es) played on 10 November 2019. Source: Extratime.com
Legend: Blue = home team win; Yellow = draw; Red = away team win.
For upcoming matches, an "a" indicates there is an article about the rivalry between the two participants.

=== Matches 15–21 ===
Teams played each other once.

| Home \ Away | COR | GAL | PEA | KIL | LIM | SHE | DLR | WEX |
|---|---|---|---|---|---|---|---|---|
| Cork City | — | 2–2 | — | — | — | 0–4 | — | 1–1 |
| Galway | — | — | 1–1 | 5–0 | — | — | 2–1 | — |
| Peamount United | 8–1 | — | — | — | — | 1–2 | — | 2–1 |
| Kilkenny United | 1–1 | — | 2–12 | — | 1–7 | 1–11 | — | — |
| Limerick | 2–3 | 1–6 | 0–7 | — | — | — | — | 1–11 |
| Shelbourne | — | 3–2 | — | — | 4–2 | — | 1–0 | 2–1 |
| DLR Waves | 1–3 | — | 0–8 | 1–1 | 2–1 | — | — | — |
| Wexford Youths | — | 2–2 | — | 7–1 | — | — | 7–2 | — |

Updated to match(es) played on 10 November 2019. Source: Extratime.com
Legend: Blue = home team win; Yellow = draw; Red = away team win.
For upcoming matches, an "a" indicates there is an article about the rivalry between the two participants.

== Statistics ==
=== Top scorers ===
| Rank | Player | Club | Goals |
|---|---|---|---|
| 1 | (Republic of Ireland) Rianna Jarrett | Wexford Youths | 26 |
| 2 | (Republic of Ireland) Áine O'Gorman | Peamount United | 20 |
| 3 | (Republic of Ireland) Megan Smyth-Lynch | Peamount United | 19 |
| 4 | (Republic of Ireland) Eleanor Ryan Doyle | Peamount United | 18 |
| 5 | (Republic of Ireland) Amber Barrett | Peamount United | 16 |

Last updated: 10 November 2019.
Source: Extratime.com

== Awards ==
=== Player of the Month ===
| Month | Player of the Month | | References |
| Month | Player | Club | References |
|---|---|---|---|
| March | (Republic of Ireland) Alex Kavanagh | Shelbourne | |
| April | (Republic of Ireland) Katie McCarthy | Cork City | |
| May | (Republic of Ireland) Jamie Finn | Shelbourne | |
| June | (Republic of Ireland) Eleanor Ryan-Doyle | Peamount United | |

Apparently no awards were made from July to October.

=== Annual awards ===
| Award | Winner | Club |
|---|---|---|
| WNL Player of the Year | (Republic of Ireland) Rianna Jarrett | Wexford Youths |
| Young Player of the Year | (Republic of Ireland) Emily Whelan | Shelbourne |
| Services to the Women's National League | (Republic of Ireland) Eamon Naughton | |

WNL Team of the Year
| Goalkeeper | (Republic of Ireland) Naoisha McAloon (Peamount United) | | | |
| Defenders | (Republic of Ireland) Sadhbh Doyle (Galway) | (Republic of Ireland) Claire Walsh (Peamount United) | (Republic of Ireland) Jamie Finn (Shelbourne) | (Republic of Ireland) Lauren Dwyer (Wexford Youths) |
| Midfielders | (Republic of Ireland) Eleanor Ryan Doyle (Peamount United) | (Republic of Ireland) Megan Smyth-Lynch (Peamount United) | (Republic of Ireland) Alex Kavanagh (Shelbourne) | (Republic of Ireland) Kylie Murphy (Wexford Youths) |
| Forwards | (Republic of Ireland) Emily Whelan (Shelbourne) | | (Republic of Ireland) Rianna Jarrett (Wexford Youths) | |
