= 2017 Women's National League (Ireland) =

Women's National League
- Season: 2017
- Champions: Wexford Youths
- Champions League: Wexford Youths
- Matches: 63
- Goals: 241 (3.83 per match)
- Top goalscorer: Amber Barrett (Peamount United, 16 goals)
- Biggest home win: Peamount United 9–0 Kilkenny United (20 May 2017)
- Biggest away win: Kilkenny United 0–11 Shelbourne (31 May 2017)
- Highest scoring: Kilkenny United 0–11 Shelbourne (31 May 2017)

The 2017 Women's National League, known for sponsorship reasons as the Continental Tyres Women's National League, was the seventh season of the Women's National League, the highest women's association football league in the Republic of Ireland. It was the second league season to run over an entire calendar year.

Wexford Youths won the season and their third National League title. Amber Barrett from Peamount United won her second top scorer award with 16 goals.

== Teams ==

Team	Home town/suburb	Stadium	2016 finish
Cork City W.F.C.	Cork	Bishopstown Stadium	6th
Galway W.F.C.	Galway	Eamonn Deacy Park	5th
Kilkenny United W.F.C.	Kilkenny	Buckley Park	7th
Peamount United	Newcastle, County Dublin	Greenogue	3rd
Shelbourne Ladies	Santry	Morton Stadium	1st
UCD Waves	Dún Laoghaire–Rathdown	Jackson Park	2nd
Wexford Youths	Crossabeg	Ferrycarrig Park	4th

== Format ==
Teams play each other three times, either twice at home and once away, or once at home and twice away. Each team plays 18 games, 9 home and 9 away.

== Standings ==
Pos	Team	Pld	W	D	L	GF	GA	GD	Pts	Qualification
1	Wexford Youths (C)	18	12	4	2	35	17	+18	40	2018–19 Champions League
2	Peamount United	18	12	2	4	47	23	+24	38	
3	Shelbourne Ladies	18	8	7	3	57	22	+35	31	
4	UCD Waves	18	8	3	7	37	23	+14	27	
5	Cork City	18	7	1	10	32	33	−1	22	
6	Galway W.F.C.	18	5	3	10	25	35	−10	18	
7	Kilkenny United	18	1	0	17	8	88	−80	3	

(C) Champions

== Awards ==
=== Monthly awards ===
Month	Player of the Month		References
Month	Player	Club	References
March	Eleanor Ryan-Doyle	Peamount	
April	Kylie Murphy	Wexford	
May	Ciara McNamara	Cork	
June	Lucy McCartan	Peamount	
August	Pearl Slattery	Shelbourne	
October	Heather Payne	Peamount	

=== Annual awards ===
Award	Winner	Club
WNL Player of the Year	Amber Barrett	Peamount United
Young Player of the Year	Saoirse Noonan	Cork City

WNL Team of the Year
Goalkeeper	(Republic of Ireland) Amanda Budden (Cork City)			
Defenders	(Republic of Ireland) Claire Walsh (UCD Waves)	(Republic of Ireland) Niamh Prior (Shelbourne)	(Republic of Ireland) Chloe Moloney (Peamount United)	(Republic of Ireland) Ciara McNamara (Cork City)
Midfielders	(Republic of Ireland) Karen Duggan (UCD Waves)		(Republic of Ireland) Kylie Murphy (Wexford Youths)	(Republic of Ireland) Eleanor Ryan-Doyle (Peamount United)
Forwards	(Republic of Ireland) Amber Barrett (Peamount United)		(Republic of Ireland) Claire O'Riordan (Wexford Youths)	(Republic of Ireland) Clare Shine (Cork City)
