= 2024 League of Ireland Women's Premier Division =

Irish women's football league season

Premier Division
- Season: 2024
- Dates: 9 March 2024 – 12 October 2024
- Champions: Athlone Town
- Champions League: Athlone Town
- Matches: 110
- Goals: 287 (2.61 per match)
- Biggest home win: Galway United 5–0 Cork City; 16 March 2024
- Biggest away win: Bohemian FC 0–4 Shamrock Rovers; 8 June 2024; Sligo Rovers 0–4 DLR Waves; 7 September 2024; Sligo Rovers 0–4 Shelbourne; 11 September 2024; DLR Waves 0–4 Galway United; 14 September 2024
- Highest scoring: Cork City 2–5 Galway United; 11 September 2024
- Longest winning run: 8 matches Athlone Town
- Longest unbeaten run: 13 matches Shelbourne
- Longest winless run: 18 matches Sligo Rovers
- Longest losing run: 10 matches Sligo Rovers
- Highest attendance: 2,861; Galway United 4–0 DLR Waves; 4 May 2024
- Lowest attendance: 75; Peamount United 0–1 Cork City; 6 July 2024
- Attendance: 27,095 (246 per match)
- All statistics correct as of 12 October 2024.

The 2024 Premier Division, also known as SSE Airtricity Women's Premier Division for sponsorship reasons, was the 2nd edition of the top-tier women's football league in the Republic of Ireland since the restructure in 2022.

Athlone Town clinched the League title with one match to space, defeating Bohemians 2–0 at home on 5 October 2024. This was the first time the Midlanders had been crowned as champions.

Peamount United were the defending champions, having been crowned champions for the fourth time in 2023.

The first matches of the 2024 season were played on 9 March 2024. The final matchday was scheduled for 12 October 2024.

Locations of teams in the 2024 Premier Division.

== League table ==
Pos	Team	Pld	W	D	L	GF	GA	GD	Pts	Qualification
1	Athlone Town (C)	20	15	2	3	40	16	+24	47	Secures a spot in the 2025–26 Champions League preliminary round
2	Shelbourne	20	13	6	1	38	9	+29	45	
3	Galway United	20	13	2	5	43	16	+27	41	
4	Wexford FC	20	8	7	5	28	20	+8	31	
5	Shamrock Rovers	20	6	9	5	32	23	+9	27	
6	Peamount United	20	7	5	8	24	26	−2	26	
7	Treaty United	20	7	2	11	23	27	−4	23	
8	Bohemian FC	20	6	4	10	17	32	−15	22	
9	Cork City	20	5	3	12	14	41	−27	18	
10	DLR Waves	20	4	4	12	15	36	−21	16	
11	Sligo Rovers	20	1	6	13	13	41	−28	9	

Source: LeagueOfIreland.ie
(C) Champions

== Results ==
Home \ Away	ATH	BOH	COR	DLR	GAL	PEA	SHA	SHE	SLI	TRE	WEX
Athlone Town		2–0	4–0	3–0	0–2	3–1	3–3	1–1	5–1	1–0	1–0
Bohemians	0–1		0–1	2–0	1–0	2–2	0–4	1–1	1–0	2–1	1–4
Cork City	0–1	2–1		0–1	2–5	0–2	2–1	1–4	1–2	0–3	0–0
DLR Waves	0–1	0–0	1–1		0–4	3–2	1–1	0–3	2–0	0–2	0–1
Galway United	3–2	4–0	5–0	4–0		3–1	1–0	0–1	2–1	4–1	1–2
Peamount United	2–1	4–2	0–1	2–2	0–0		0–1	0–2	2–0	0–1	1–0
Shamrock Rovers	1–2	5–1	1–1	1–0	0–1	0–2		1–1	1–1	2–2	1–1
Shelbourne	1–2	1–0	5–1	4–0	1–0	3–0	0–0		0–0	4–2	0–0
Sligo Rovers	0–2	0–0	0–1	0–4	2–3	1–1	1–4	0–4		1–2	2–2
Treaty United	0–3	0–1	3–0	2–0	1–0	0–1	1–3	0–1	0–0		1–2
Wexford	1–2	0–2	2–0	3–1	1–1	1–1	2–2	0–1	4–1	2–1	

Source: LeagueOfIreland.ie
Legend: Blue = home team win; Yellow = draw; Red = away team win.
