= 2014–15 Women's National League (Ireland) =

Women's National League
- Season: 2014–15
- Champions: Wexford Youths
- UEFA Women's Champions League: Wexford Youths
- Top goalscorer: Aine O'Gorman (UCD Waves); 25

The 2014–15 Women's National League was the fourth season of the Women's National League. On 20 August 2014, at the Aviva Stadium, Continental Tyres were unveiled as the new sponsor of both the Women's National League and FAI Women's Cup. Before the season started there were two name changes following takeovers and/or mergers. Cork Women's F.C. were taken over by FORAS/Cork City F.C. and as a result were renamed Cork City W.F.C. It was also announced that DLR Waves and UCD's senior women's team would join forces and become known as UCD Waves. Shamrock Rovers withdrew from the league, leaving seven teams to play each other.

Wexford Youths won the league title, finishing two points clear of second placed UCD Waves. UCD Waves also finished as runners-up in the 2014 FAI Women's Cup, losing 2–1 after extra time in the final to Raheny United. Raheny then went on to complete a cup double when they also won the 2015 WNL Cup. It is first time Raheny United had won the latter cup. In the final they defeated Peamount United 3–2 after extra time with a last minute Katie McCabe goal. McCabe, who had also scored in the FAI Women's Cup final, missed out on the opportunity to finish the season as the league top goalscorer after Raheny's final league opponents, Cork City, forfeited the game as they were unable to field a team. Aine O'Gorman finished the season as both top league goalscorer and the WNL Player of the Season.

== Final table ==
Pos	Team	Pld	W	D	L	GF	GA	GD	Pts	Qualification
1	Wexford Youths (C)	18	14	1	3	43	15	+28	43	2015–16 UEFA Women's Champions League
2	UCD Waves	18	13	2	3	69	19	+50	41	
3	Raheny United	18	11	4	3	55	24	+31	37	
4	Peamount United	18	6	5	7	34	38	−4	23	
5	Castlebar Celtic	18	5	3	10	30	41	−11	18	
6	Galway W.F.C.	18	3	5	10	27	38	−11	14	
7	Cork City	18	0	2	16	14	83	−69	2	

(C) Champions

== WNL Awards ==
Senior Player of the Year

- Áine O'Gorman (UCD Waves)

Young Player of the Year

- Rianna Jarrett (Wexford Youths)

Irish Daily Mail Golden Boot

- Áine O'Gorman (UCD Waves)

Service to Women's Football Award

- Pauline O'Shaughnessy (WFAI)

Team of the Season

No.	Pos.	Player	Date of birth (age)	Caps	Club
1	GK	Mary Rose Kelly			Wexford Youths
2	DF	Nicola Sinnott			Wexford Youths
3	DF	Ciara Rossiter			Wexford Youths
4	DF	Keara Cormican			Galway W.F.C.
5	DF	Niamh Walsh			Raheny United
6	MF	Karen Duggan			UCD Waves
7	MF	Kylie Murphy			Wexford Youths
8	MF	Áine O'Gorman			UCD Waves
9	FW	Claire O'Riordan			Wexford Youths
10	FW	Carol Breen			Wexford Youths
11	FW	Katie McCabe			Raheny United
