= Turners Cross (stadium) =

Football stadium in Cork, Ireland

- The Cross
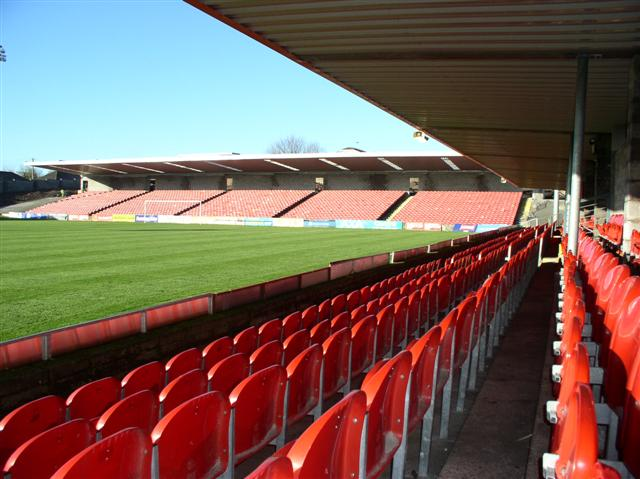
- The St. Anne's Road end of Turners Cross, viewed from the Derrynane Road stand
- Interactive map of Turners Cross
- Full name: Munster FA Turners Cross Stadium
- Location: Curragh Road, Turners Cross, Cork
- Coordinates: 51°53′8″N 8°28′4″W
- Owner: Munster Football Association
- Operator: Munster Football Association
- Capacity: 7,485 (all-seated)
- Surface: Grass
- Scoreboard: Yes
- Record attendance: 12,000 (Cork City vs Dundalk, 21 April 1991)
- Public transit: Cork railway station Evergreen Road bus stop

Construction
- Opened: Mid-late 1800s
- Renovated: 1980s, 2007

Tenant
- Cork City F.C.

Turners Cross, also known as Turners Cross Stadium and officially as Munster FA Turners Cross Stadium from January 2026, is an all-seater football stadium located in and synonymous with the district of Turners Cross in Cork, Ireland. It is owned by the Munster Football Association (MFA), and is used by the MFA and by League of Ireland side Cork City.

It was the first all-seated, all-covered stadium in Ireland following redevelopment in 2009, and it is currently one out of only three, the others being the Aviva Stadium and Tallaght Stadium.

== Use ==
Cork City play their home games in the stadium. The ground also sees a large volume of matches every year under the auspices of both the MFA and the Football Association of Ireland (FAI), including local, regional, national, and international matches and cup finals at schoolboy, junior, intermediate, senior, and underage international level.

== Facilities ==
For many years, Turners Cross was little more than a pitch with a few grassy banks and a covered terrace euphemistically called "The Shed". However, from the early 2000s, the stadium was redeveloped by the MFA and became the first stadium in use in the League of Ireland to be seated and covered on all four sides.

As of 2016, the configuration of the stadium consists of the 1,857-seat covered "Donie Forde Stand", which holds the stadium control box, press broadcasting area, and the family section. This is faced by the 1,128-seat covered "Derrynane Road" stand.

At the western end of the ground is the covered St. Anne's Stand which has a capacity of 2,720. The newest stand (the "Joe Delaney Stand") is at the eastern end, on a site previously occupied by "The Shed". The Shed previously held over 2,500 supporters and was home to Cork City F.C.'s more vocal fans. This newly developed section seats 1,660 and was opened in March 2007.

== History ==
While known locally and amongst fans as "The Cross", the ground has also been nicknamed "The Box" in the past. This accounts for the title of Plunkett Carter's book on Cork soccer, From The Lodge to the Box: A Miscellany of Cork Soccer (2002), where 'the lodge' refers to Flower Lodge. The Flower Lodge ground was originally owned by the Ancient Order of Hibernians and was the previous home of Cork soccer. This ground was subsequently sold to the Gaelic Athletic Association, and renamed Páirc Uí Rinn, for Christy Ring, a noted County Cork hurler.

Cork Constitution, then a rugby and cricket club, was the first club to lease the Turners Cross grounds in 1897. (A once popular trivia question was "Which President of Ireland scored a penalty at Turners Cross?" The answer is Éamon de Valera (1882–1975) who in his early years played rugby for Rockwell. The penalty in question was during a Rockwell vs Cork Constitution rugby match in the Munster Cup.)

Turners Cross was in use for association football by 1905, and Gaelic games by the 1920s. Something of a battle developed to acquire permanent use of the grounds in the 1920s. Nemo Rangers secured the ground in 1926, and sought help from the Cork County Board to make the situation permanent. However costs forced Nemo to abandon it in 1929, with the Munster Football Association subsequently stating that they had 'acquired' the ground at their AGM two weeks later. In order to provide a long-term home for the MFA and Cork soccer, the FAI negotiated a 98-year lease on Turners Cross with the land's owner Helena O'Sullivan. Subsequently, during the 1940s, Cork United (whose home grounds were at the Mardyke) also used the ground for training matches and 'B' team matches. In January 1947, following extensive flooding in the city, Cork United switched a league match with Drumcondra to the Cross at reputedly 15 minutes notice.

When Evergreen United were elected to the League of Ireland in 1951, they became sub-tenants of the FAI at the ground in a sharing arrangement with the MFA. Evergreen later changed their name to Cork Celtic. After winning their first (and only) Dublin City Cup, by defeating Drumcondra in the final, which was held at the Cross, the next day's Irish Press stated, "Turner's Cross ground itself is not conducive to good football, and there was absolutely no atmosphere." Celtic themselves made it clear that without owning the ground it would only ever have a basic level of upkeep.

At the start of the 1977/78 season, Celtic again looked for a longer lease on the ground in order to develop it for the purpose of raising additional income. The club had been in decline since winning the League in 1974, and saw developing it as their only means of survival. The FAI's legal advisers had previously been unable to find the property owner or their original lease, however a complex ownership structure was eventually unravelled. Unable to resolve the tenancy situation with the FAI, Celtic spent no money on the upkeep of the Cross and it was eventually deemed unfit for use by the League for the 1978/79 season. As a result, the club moved to Flower Lodge for what would be their final season - being expelled from the League in the summer of 1979. Despite this, Cork Celtic's holding company still held the sub-lease.

In 1980 a legal wrangle arose when Cork United (who, as Albert Rovers, had replaced Cork Hibernians in the League in 1976) announced plans to move from Flower Lodge to Turners Cross. Cork United were hoping that the ground's location and more compact space would attract more supporters. However the trustees of the defunct Cork Celtic club, still holding the sub-lease, demanded £10,000 to relinquish it. With the help of Des Casey of Dundalk F.C. (the League's representative on the board of the FAI), the situation was resolved, which allowed Cork United to call the ground 'home' for the next two seasons. The playing surface remained notoriously bad, however, being branded 'the worst in the League', with Cork United also promising to upgrade the ground in the event of the lease situation being resolved. After Cork United were expelled from the League in 1982 the FAI closed the ground, then sold its interest in it to the Munster Football Association the following year.

The Munster Football Association initiated a programme of ground improvements, spending approx £80,000 initially, and the ground was reopened in May 1985. League of Ireland football was supposed to return to the Cross that Autumn via Amby Fogarty's new Cork Hibernians side. However the club was removed from the League of Ireland without playing a game as the MFA refused the new team a lease on the ground unless they had their own public liability insurance, which Hibernians could not afford. Cork City, who had played their first two seasons in Flower Lodge after being elected to the League of Ireland in 1984, then sought a move to become tenants of the Munster Football Association (MFA) at Turners Cross due to the cost of insurance at the Lodge. The move was granted by the MFA. Meanwhile, the organisation proceeded with the next stages of its planned improvements. A grant of £30,000 in 1989 was spent on cosmetic improvements to complete 'Phase Two'.

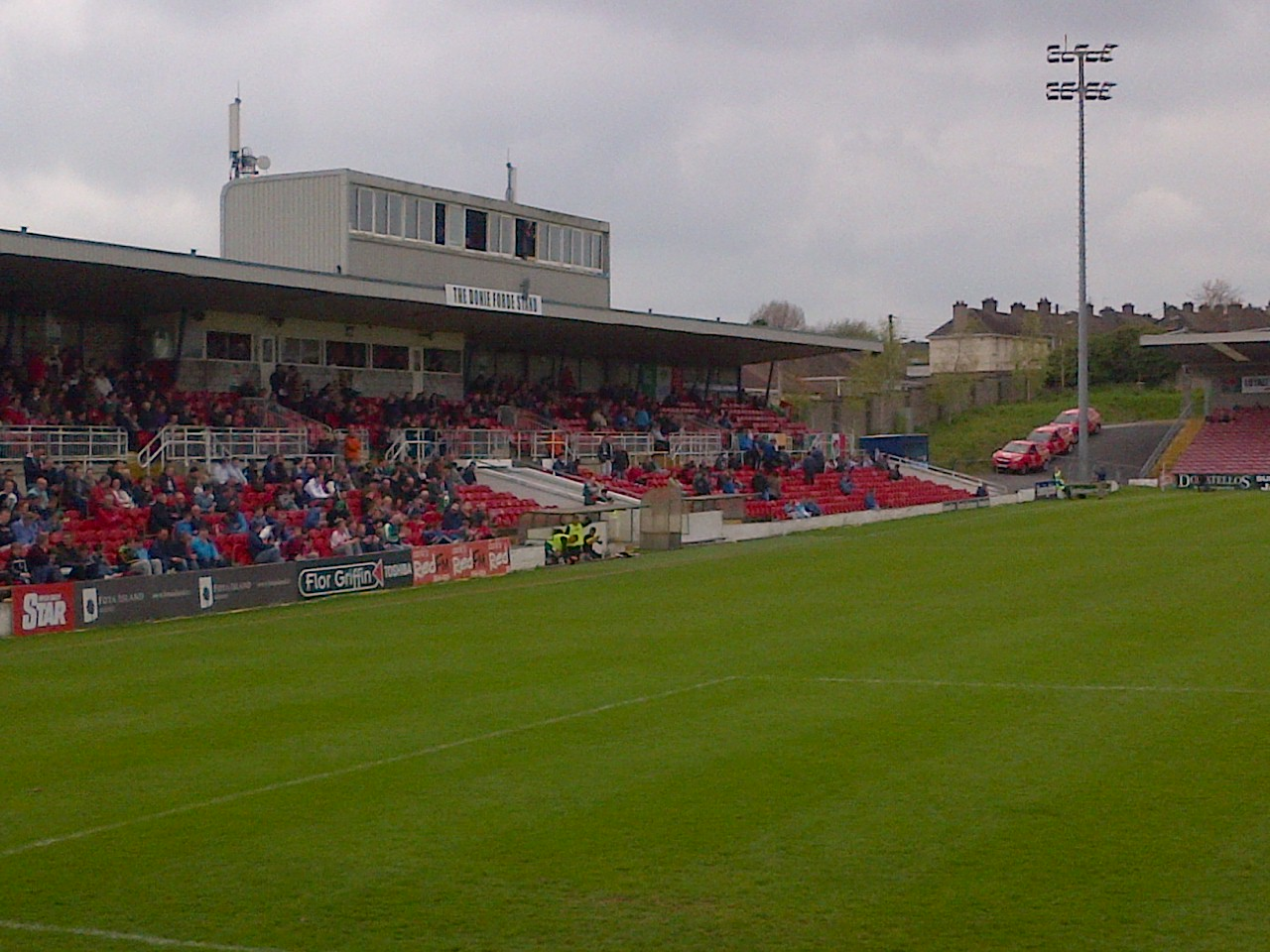
The "Donie Ford Stand"

Having failed to buy Flower Lodge in 1988, Cork City moved to their own ground in Bishopstown in 1992. With Cork City gone, the MFA were able to announce plans to invest up to £1.5 million in the ground. Work on the main stand (what would become the Donie Ford Stand) costing £300,000 (made up of a government grant of £200,000 and an FAI contribution of £100,000) was announced in 1996, bringing the stated spending to approx £750,000, with the work being completed in 1998. But Cork City's move to Bishopstown backfired and, following bankruptcy, the club returned to Turners Cross as tenants in 1996, where it has remained to date.

In 2000, the MFA received a grant of £100,000 from the Department of Sport for further investment. This started a new round of development in the first decade of the 21st century, where the Derrynane side of the ground was made all-seater, a covered all-seated stand was installed at the St. Anne's Road End of the ground, and the 'Shed' was replaced by a new, covered, all-seater stand - the Joe Delaney Stand. Floodlights were installed in 2002 and the first floodlit game played was an Irish Under-21 international against Denmark in March 2002.

In October 2017, ex-hurricane Ophelia blew the roof off the Derrynane Road stand.

In October 2022, the MFA and Cork City negotiated a 20-year agreement covering "rental costs, stadium usage and stadium commercial opportunities", providing for ongoing use of the ground for League of Ireland matches (in the men's game) and Women's National League matches (by Cork City W.F.C.).

The ground was temporarily and partially closed, in October 2023, as a result of an FAI ruling following the throwing of "missiles" during the 2023 FAI Cup semi-final between Cork City and St Patrick's Athletic. Between April and May 2024, the ground was temporarily closed due to the state of the pitch surface.

In January 2026 it was reported that, at a council meeting of the Munster Football Association, it was determined that the stadium would officially be referred to as "Munster FA Turners Cross Stadium" in fixtures listings, marketing materials and "other communications relating to the stadium".

On 12 June 2026, the venue hosted a League of Ireland Premier Division game between Galway United and Dundalk as there was no available venue in Galway for the match.

=== Notable matches ===
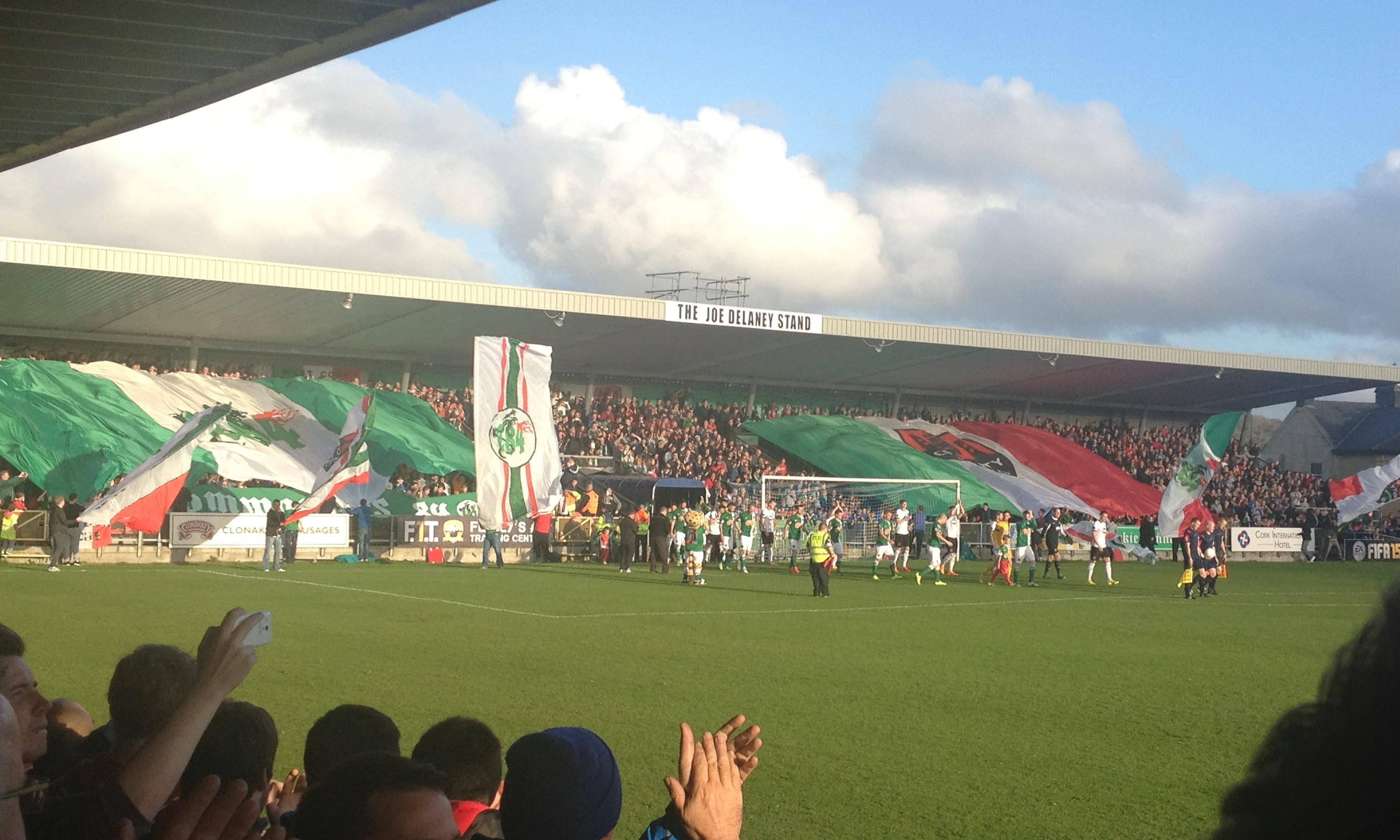
Colour from "shed-end" supporters ahead of a League of Ireland match in 2015

Turners Cross has hosted a small number of men's senior internationals, including a friendly between the national team and Belarus in May 2016 (1–2), and a "B" team fixture against England in 1990 (4–1). Elsewhere in Cork, Flower Lodge hosted a full international on 26 May 1985 between Ireland and Spain (0–0), while The Mardyke hosted Ireland vs Hungary in 1939 (2–2). The stadium has also hosted eight Republic of Ireland under-21 national football team games and other international underage games – including games in the 1994 UEFA European Under-16 Football Championship.

In addition to soccer, rugby and gaelic games, boxing and gymkhana events have also been held at Turners Cross over the years.

Preceded by Windsor Park	Host of the Setanta Sports Cup Final; 2008	Succeeded by Tallaght Stadium
