= Shauna Peare =

Irish female association football player

Personal information
- Full name: Shauna Margaret Peare
- Date of birth: 10 September 1992 (age 34)
- Place of birth: Dublin, Republic of Ireland
- Height: 1.70 m (5 ft 7 in)
- Position: Defender

Team information
- Current team: DLR Waves
- Number: 17

Senior career*
Years	Team	Apps	(Gls)
2014–2015	UTB Ocelets		
2015–2016	Houston Aces		
2016–2017	San Zaccaria	2	(0)
2017–2018	Verona	9	(0)
2018	Assi IF		
2018–2019	Houston Aces		
2019–2020	T.E.K. United		
2020–2021	CD Santa Teresa	2	(0)
2021–2022	Athlone Town	5	(0)
2022–2023	FC Sassari Torres	11	(0)
2023–2024	Killester Donnycarney		
2024	San Marino Academy	16	(1)
2024	Brescia Calcio		
2025–	DLR Waves	8	(0)
- * Club domestic league appearances and goals

Shauna Peare is an Irish footballer who has plays for DLR Waves. She has previously played in Italy, Spain, Sweden and the USA.

== Career ==
Peare has played in several leagues across Europe including Italian leagues for clubs San Zaccaria, Verona, FC Sassari Torres, Brescia Calcio and San Marino Academy.
