= Jetta Berrill =

Irish footballer

Personal information
- Full name: Jetta Berrill
- Date of birth: 31 January 1994 (age 32)
- Height: 1.67 m (5 ft 6 in)
- Position: Midfielder

Youth career
- Albion Rovers

Senior career*
Years	Team	Apps	(Gls)
2012–2014	Peamount United		
2014–2017	UCD Waves		
2019	DLR Waves		
2021	DLR Waves		
2022–2024	Peamount United		

International career^{‡}
2013	Republic of Ireland U19	2	(0)
2016–2017	Republic of Ireland	4	(0)
- * Club domestic league appearances and goals as of 22:29, 18 September 2021 (UTC) ‡ National team caps and goals as of 22:29, 18 September 2021 (UTC)

Jetta Berrill (born 31 January 1994) is an Irish former footballer who played as a midfielder for Peamount United. She has been a member of the Republic of Ireland women's national team.

== Club career ==
In June 2010, 16-year-old Berrill debuted for Albion Rovers, a club from her native Monasterboice in County Louth. Despite Berrill scoring twice, Rovers lost the match 4–2 to Templeogue.

Berrill made her first Women's National League (WNL) appearances for Peamount United in 2012–13, before she joined UCD Waves in 2014.

In 2017 Berrill left UCD Waves and moved to Hungary to train as a veterinarian. She briefly returned to the WNL when she played for DLR Waves during her 2019 summer vacation.

After completing her Hungarian vet studies in June 2021, Berrill re-joined DLR Waves. She quickly recovered her best form, scoring four goals in four games. In January 2022 she transferred back to Peamount United.

== International career ==
Republic of Ireland women's national football team manager Susan Ronan gave Berrill a call up to the senior squad for the first time in April 2016, for the UEFA Women's Euro 2017 qualifying fixtures against Montenegro and Spain. In August 2016 Ronan named Berrill in a young and predominantly home-based senior squad for a training camp in Wales. She played in two challenge matches against the Welsh hosts, winning praise from Ronan: "In particular, Jetta Berrill played excellently over the two games".

With Ireland already eliminated she won a first competitive cap against Portugal in the final qualifying match at Tallaght Stadium, Dublin on 20 September 2016. Despite Berrill's promising performance as an attacking right-back, she conceded the penalty kick which led to Ireland's 1–0 defeat. She played the first half of a 2–1 home friendly win over the Basque Country on 25 November 2016, being substituted for Savannah McCarthy at half-time. At the 2017 Cyprus Cup Berrill made another brief appearance, as a 90th-minute substitute for Áine O'Gorman in the 2–0 third-place play-off defeat by North Korea.

Berrill also represented Ireland at the 2013 and 2017 Summer Universiades.
