= 2023 League of Ireland Women's Premier Division =

League of Ireland Women's Premier Division
- Season: 2023
- Dates: 4 March 2023 – 11 November 2023
- Champions: Peamount United F.C. 4th title

The 2023 League of Ireland Women's Premier Division, known as the SSE Airtricity Women's Premier Division for sponsorship reasons, was the 2023 season of the League of Ireland Women's Premier Division, the highest women's association football league in the Republic of Ireland. It was the first season following a "rebrand" of the women's and men's leagues, by the League of Ireland, in late 2022. As winners of the 2022 Women's National League, Shelbourne were defending champions. Peamount United won the 2023 league, with several games in hand.

== League table ==
=== Standings ===
Pos	Team	Pld	W	D	L	GF	GA	GD	Pts	Qualification or relegation
1	Peamount United	20	17	1	2	44	15	+29	52	Qualification for the UEFA Women's Champions League
2	Shelbourne	20	15	1	4	49	13	+36	46	
3	Shamrock Rovers	20	13	6	1	51	17	+34	45	
4	Galway United	20	12	2	6	29	13	+16	38	
5	Athlone Town	20	11	2	7	49	25	+24	35	
6	Bohemians	20	9	4	7	21	27	−6	31	
7	Wexford FC Women	20	8	4	8	30	31	−1	28	
8	DLR Waves	20	3	4	13	13	31	−18	13	
9	Sligo Rovers	20	3	2	15	22	54	−32	11	
10	Treaty United	20	1	5	14	10	49	−39	8	
11	Cork City	20	1	3	16	11	54	−43	6	

Updated to match(es) played on 11 November 2023. Source: Extratime.com
