= Amber Barrett =

Irish association football player (1996)

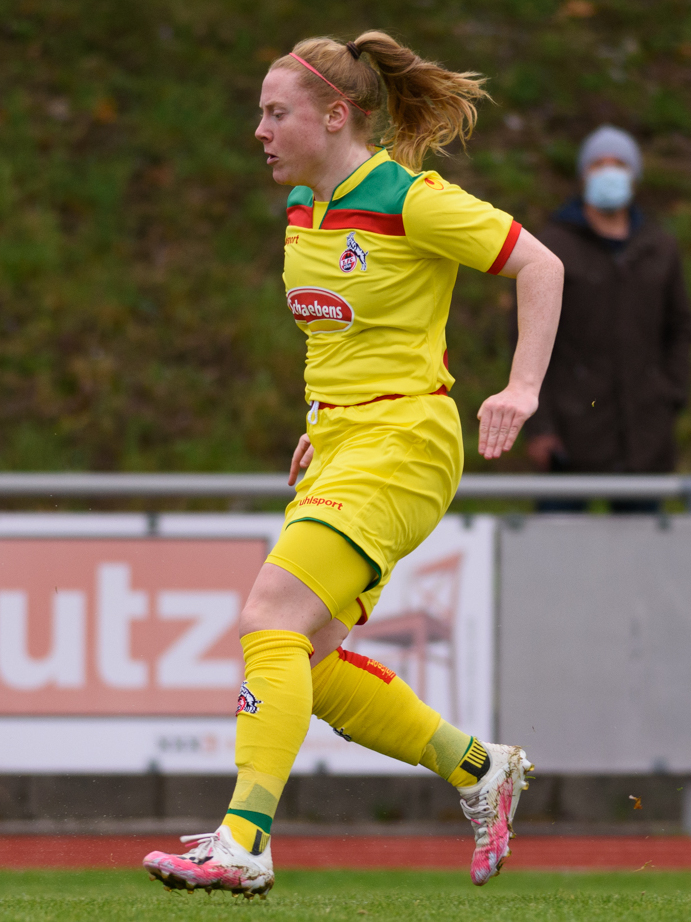
- Playing for Köln in October 2020

Personal information
- Full name: Amber Barrett
- Date of birth: 16 January 1996 (age 30)
- Place of birth: Milford, County Donegal, Ireland
- Height: 1.66 m (5 ft 5 in)
- Position: Forward

Team information
- Current team: Standard Liège
- Number: 9

Youth career
- Lagan Harps FC

Senior career*
Years	Team	Apps	(Gls)
2015–2019	Peamount United	81	(78)
2019–2022	1. FC Köln	48	(16)
2022–2023	Turbine Potsdam	17	(0)
2023–2026	Standard Liège	32	(22)
2026–	RC Strasbourg	10	(5)

International career^{‡}
2017–	Republic of Ireland	61	(10)
- * Club domestic league appearances and goals as of 6 May 2026 ‡ National team caps and goals as of 18 October 2026

Amber Barrett (born 16 January 1996) is an Irish international footballer who plays for Première Ligue club Strasbourg. She made her debut for the Republic of Ireland women's national football team in September 2017. A prolific forward, Barrett was the WNL Player of the Season in 2017 and top goalscorer in 2016, 2017 and 2018 with Peamount United.

== Club career ==
Barrett's father, Shaun Paul Barrett, has managed numerous clubs and county teams for Donegal GAA, as has her brother, Luke. Another brother, Kane, has also been involved with Milford.

In 2017 Barrett, who was in the final year of a teacher training course at Maynooth University, quit Donegal GAA when a bout of glandular fever forced her to choose between Gaelic football and soccer. She was named Women's National League Player of the Season and Top Goalscorer in the 2017 season. In 2018 she lost out on the Player of the Season to Rianna Jarrett but retained her Top Goalscorer award by scoring 30 goals, including seven hat-tricks, in 21 league appearances.

In 2019 she joined German side 1. FC Köln, newly promoted to the Frauen-Bundesliga, where she spent three years before signing for Turbine Potsdam in July 2022.

In June 2023 Barrett signed for Standard Liège of the Belgian Women's Super League, the first tier of women's football in Belgium.

In January 2026 Barrett joined French club Strasbourg who play in the Première Ligue the countries top division.

== International career ==
National team coach Colin Bell gave Barrett her senior debut in September 2017, as a substitute in a 2–0 FIFA Women's World Cup qualifying win over Northern Ireland at Mourneview Park in Lurgan. She started an encouraging 0–0 draw away to European Champions the Netherlands in November 2017 and was praised by Bell for her performance.

In April 2018, Barrett's 87th-minute winning goal secured a 2–1 win over Slovakia at Tallaght Stadium, which kept Ireland in contention for World Cup qualification.

On 11 October 2022, Barrett scored the only goal in a 1–0 win against Scotland to send Ireland to the World Cup for the first time. She was included in Vera Pauw's team for the tournament, and made her debut as a substitute in Ireland's second game.

== International appearances ==
As of match played 13 October 2026

Appearances and goals by national team and year
National team	Year	Apps	Goals
Republic of Ireland	2016	2	0
Republic of Ireland	2017	3	0
Republic of Ireland	2018	7	1
Republic of Ireland	2019	6	1
Republic of Ireland	2020	4	0
Republic of Ireland	2021	6	2
Republic of Ireland	2022	6	1
Republic of Ireland	2023	5	2
Republic of Ireland	2024	8	0
Republic of Ireland	2025	8	2
Republic of Ireland	2026	7	1
Total		61	10

== International goals ==
Scores and results list Republic of Ireland's goals first. Score column indicates score after each Barrett goal. Updated as of 5th June 2026

International goals scored by Amber Barrett
No.	Cap	Date	Venue	Opponent	Score	Result	Competition	Ref.
1	7	6 April 2018	Tallaght Stadium, Dublin, Ireland	Slovakia	2–1	2–1	2019 FIFA Women's World Cup qualification	
2	18	12 November 2019	Nea Smyrni Stadium, Athens, Greece	Greece	1–0	1-1	UEFA Women's Euro 2022 qualifying	
3	24	11 June 2021	Laugardalsvöllur, Reykjavík, Iceland	Iceland	2–3	2–3	Friendly	
4	28	30 November 2021	Tallaght Stadium, Dublin	Georgia	10–0	11–0	2023 FIFA Women's World Cup UEFA qual. Group A	
5	33	11 October 2022	Hampden Park, Glasgow	Scotland	1–0	1–0	2023 FIFA Women's World Cup UEFA play-offs	
6	36	22 June 2023	Tallaght Stadium, Dublin	Zambia	1-1	3-2	Friendly	
7	36	22 June 2023	Tallaght Stadium, Dublin	Zambia	3-1	3-2	Friendly	
8	50	4 April 2025	Theodoros Vardinogiannis Stadium, Heraklion, Greece	Greece	4–0	4–0	2025 UEFA Women's Nations League	
9	51	8 April 2025	Tallaght Stadium, Dublin	Greece	1–0	2–1	2025 UEFA Women's Nations League	
10	58	5 June 2026	Páirc Uí Chaoimh, Cork	Netherlands	3-2	3-2	2027 FIFA Women's World Cup qualification	

== Personal life ==
Barrett shares a cat named Wee Bobby with fellow Standard Liège and Republic of Ireland teammate, Claire O'Riordan.
