= Claire O'Riordan =

Irish footballer (born 1994)

Personal information
- Full name: Claire Mary O'Riordan
- Date of birth: 12 October 1994 (age 32)
- Place of birth: Newcastle West, Ireland
- Height: 5 ft 7 in (1.70 m)
- Positions: Defender; forward

Team information
- Current team: Standard Liège
- Number: 3

Senior career*
Years	Team	Apps	(Gls)
2013–2018	Wexford Youths		
2018–2022	MSV Duisburg	79	(7)
2022–2023	Celtic	29	(3)
2023–2026	Standard Liège		
2026–	Zürich	5	(0)

International career^{‡}
2016–	Republic of Ireland	19	(1)
- * Club domestic league appearances and goals as of 12 October 2026 ‡ National team caps and goals as of 12 October 2026

Claire Mary O'Riordan (born 12 October 1994) is an Irish footballer who plays for Swiss club FC Zürich Frauen and the Republic of Ireland women's national team. Mainly a defender, she can also operate as a forward.

== Early years ==
O'Riordan initially represented Limerick at county level in GAA and camogie. She was a late convert to football after not having featured at underage level for her country, but did line out for Newcastle West Rovers and Newcastle West AFC.

== Club career ==
O'Riordan started her senior career at Wexford Youths in the Irish Women's National League (WNL) where she spent five years. While at the club she won the WNL three times.

=== MSV Duisberg ===
O'Riordan signed a professional contract for German Frauen-Bundesliga side MSV Duisburg in July 2018. She played primarily as a centre-half in defence for the club. Claire made her league debut against SGS Essen on 15 September 2018. She scored her first league goal against SC Sand on 17 March 2021, scoring in the 90th minute.

=== Celtic ===
After four years in Germany, O'Riordan signed for Celtic in August 2022. She made her league debut against Partick Thistle on 14 August 2022. Claire scored her first league goal against Aberdeen on 5 February 2023, scoring in the 57th minute.

Claire left the club in 2023.

=== Standard Liège ===
In 2023, O'Riordan, along with Ireland teammate Amber Barrett, signed for Belgian club Standard Liège.

=== Zürich ===
She joined Swiss club FC Zürich Frauen ahead of the 2026–27 season joining former Ireland teammate Diane Caldwell who works with the club as a Sports Cordinater.

== International career ==
O'Riordan never played for Ireland at youth level, but won her first senior cap in a 1–0 defeat by Hungary at the 2016 Cyprus Women's Cup. She represented Ireland during their 2019 FIFA Women's World Cup qualification campaign.

=== International appearances ===
Appearances and goals by national team and year
National team	Year	Apps	Goals
Republic of Ireland	2016	1	0
Republic of Ireland	2017	4	0
Republic of Ireland	2018	4	0
Republic of Ireland	2019	6	0
Republic of Ireland	2021	2	0
Republic of Ireland	2022	1	0
Republic of Ireland	2023	1	1
Total		19	1

== International goals ==
No.	Date	Venue	Opponent	Score	Result	Competition
1.	22 June 2023	Tallaght Stadium, Dublin, Ireland	Zambia	2–1	3–2	Friendly
