= Cork City W.F.C. =

Irish women's association football team

Cork City FC Women
- Full name: Cork City Football Club
- Nicknames: The Rebel Army, The Leesiders
- Founded: 2011; 15 years ago (as Cork Women's FC)
- Ground: Turners Cross
- Capacity: 7,485
- Manager: Barry Ryan
- League: Women's National League
- 2025: 12th
- Website: https://www.corkcityfc.ie
Home colours	Away colours

Cork City FC Women is an Irish women's association football team, based in Cork city. Originally playing at Bishopstown Stadium, since the 2021 Women's National League season, the team has played its home games at Turners Cross Stadium. The club kit is the same as that of Cork City FC, as is the emblem, which is itself a variant of the Cork coat of arms. The club was founded in 2011 as Cork Women's F.C., to take its place as one of seven teams in Ireland's inaugural Women's National League. In 2014 they affiliated with FORAS, the supporters' trust behind Cork City FC, and relaunched as Cork City Women's F.C.. The club claimed their first national silverware by winning the FAI Women's Cup in 2017, and merged "fully" with Cork City FC ahead of the 2018 season. Previously known as Cork City Women's FC, as of 2024 the team is known as Cork City FC Women.

== History ==
=== 2011–2015 ===
Cork Women's F.C. was founded after the granting of a license to compete in the inaugural season of the Women's National League by the Football Association of Ireland. The club played its games in the stadium of the Cork Institute of Technology for their debut year. A squad was assembled containing players such as Denise O'Sullivan, Marie Curtin and Clare Shine under the management of Dave Bell. The club had some mixed results on the field in the 2011–12 Women's National League season, and Bell left by mutual agreement in early March 2012. Former Tralee Dynamos player Ronan Collins took the reins of the club until the end of the season (finishing third).

Maurice Farrell was appointed as head coach for the 2012–13 season. There were also changes on the pitch as players like Katie McCarthy, Marie Curtin and Sylvia Gee departed. The club also moved to Turners Cross stadium for the following season. The club finished second-bottom of the league.

For the 2013–14 WNL season, a number of players departed, and a largely new team was signed. Irish International Denise O'Sullivan was the highest profile departure, following a move to Scottish club Glasgow City. The club also began discussions with FORAS Trust which resulted in the club playing home games at Bishopstown Stadium. The team failed to register a point and only scored two goals all season, and Maurice Farrell departed the club at the end of the season.

For the 2014–15 season, the club formally agreed to a merger with Cork City F.C. and FORAS Trust, to become Cork City W.F.C. for the upcoming season. The club continued to play matches at Bishopstown stadium. Former Gaynor Cup-winning manager for Cork, Charlie Lynch, was appointed manager and assembled a squad with additions such as Irish U19 internationals Ciara McNamara and Shannon Carson. Despite an improvement on the field in performances, the club finished another season without a single league win. The club controversially forfeited their final league fixture against Raheny United, which deprived Raheny's Katie McCabe of an opportunity to claim the WNL Golden Boot.

=== 2015–2025 ===
Charlie Lynch was appointed Head of Youth Development and former Bandon AFC manager Niall O'Regan appointed as manager for the 2015–16 season. With some new players, they secured their first win in two years against newly formed Kilkenny United. In February 2016, Frank Kelleher was announced as the new manager, replacing Niall O'Regan.

Cork City WFC came 5th in the 2017 Women's National League season, and won the FAI Women's Cup in November 2017.

Affiliated with FORAS (the supporters' trust behind Cork City FC) from 2014, Cork City Women's FC was "fully merged" with Cork City FC ahead of the 2018 WNL season. During the 2018 season, the club reached the final of the Women's National League Development Shield competition, losing out to Wexford Youths W.F.C. on penalties. The club finished mid-table in the 2019 Women's National League, with 24 points from 21 games.

The team came fourth in the 2020 WNL League competition, and reached the 2020 FAI Women's Cup Final, losing out to Peamount United. The club came 8th in the 2021 league, 9th in the 2022 season, and last (11th) in 2023.

Cork City FC Women's (CCFCW) played their last game of the 2024 season at Leeside FC's ground in Little Island, as both Turners Cross and St Colman's Park in Cobh were ruled out due to weather issues. CCFCW were defeated by Sligo Rovers, and finished 9th in the 2024 table. The team finished bottom of the table in the 2025 season.

== Stadia ==
For several seasons, Cork City FC Women played their home games at Bishopstown Stadium in Curaheen. This stadium had been developed by former Cork City F.C. chairman Pat O'Donovan in 1994 as a new home for the club. However, due to the poor finances of the club, the ground was sold. Cork City F.C. rented the ground as a training and administrative base.

In Cork Women FC's debut season, games were staged at the Cork Institute of Technology Sports Stadium. The club then moved to Turners Cross for 2012–13 before moving to Bishopstown Stadium. As of early 2021, the club were due to return to Turners Cross, and by 2022 had been included in a long-term agreement with the Munster Football Association for the "use of Turner's Cross for [..] Women's National League fixtures".

== League placings ==
Season	Points Total	Position
2011–12	20	3rd
2012–13	14	6th
2013–14	0	8th
2014–15	2	7th
2015–16	7	6th
2016	9	6th
2017	22	5th
2018	24	5th
2019	24	5th
2020	19	4th
2021	16	8th
2022	18	9th
2023	6	11th
2024	18	9th
2025	8	12th

== Players ==
=== Current squad ===
Note: Flags indicate national team as defined under FIFA eligibility rules; some limited exceptions apply. Players may hold more than one non-FIFA nationality. Squad correct as of 3 August 2026.

No.	Pos.	Nation	Player
1	GK	IRL	Clodagh Fitzgerald
3	DF	IRL	Shaunagh McCarthy
4	DF	IRL	Ciara McNamara
5	DF	IRL	Heidi Mackin
6	DF	IRL	Grace Flanagan
7	MF	IRL	Ellie O'Brien
8	DF	IRL	Holly O'Hagan
9	FW	CAN	Stella Berezowski
10	MF	IRL	Eva Mangan
11	FW	IRL	Lauren Homan

No.	Pos.	Nation	Player
17	DF	IRL	Zoe Finnerty
22	GK	NZL	Una Foyle
23	DF	IRL	Leah O'Leary Callender
24	MF	IRL	Kate O'Donovan
26	FW	IRL	Amy McCarthy
27	FW	IRL	Nadine Seward
28	DF	IRL	Ciara O'Driscoll
31	FW	IRL	Sophia Redmond
33	GK	IRL	Kate Irwin

=== Internationals ===
- (Republic of Ireland) Marie Curtin
- (Republic of Ireland) Sylvia Gee
- (Republic of Ireland) Denise O'Sullivan
- (Republic of Ireland) Clare Shine
- (Republic of Ireland) Éabha O'Mahony
- (Republic of Ireland) Eve Badana
- (Republic of Ireland) Saoirse Noonan
- (Republic of Ireland) Savannah McCarthy

== Managers ==
Year/s	Manager
2011-2012	(England) Dave Bell
2012	(Republic of Ireland) Ronán Collins
2012–2014	(Republic of Ireland) Maurice Farrell
2014–2015	(Republic of Ireland) Charlie Lynch
2015–2016	(Republic of Ireland) Niall O'Regan
2016–2018	(Republic of Ireland) Frank Kelleher
2018–2021	(Republic of Ireland) Ronán Collins
2021–2022	(Republic of Ireland) Paul Farrell
2022–2024	(England) Danny Murphy
2025–present	(Republic of Ireland) Frank Kelleher

== See also ==
- League of Ireland in Cork city
