= Bishopstown Stadium =

Football stadium in Cork, Ireland

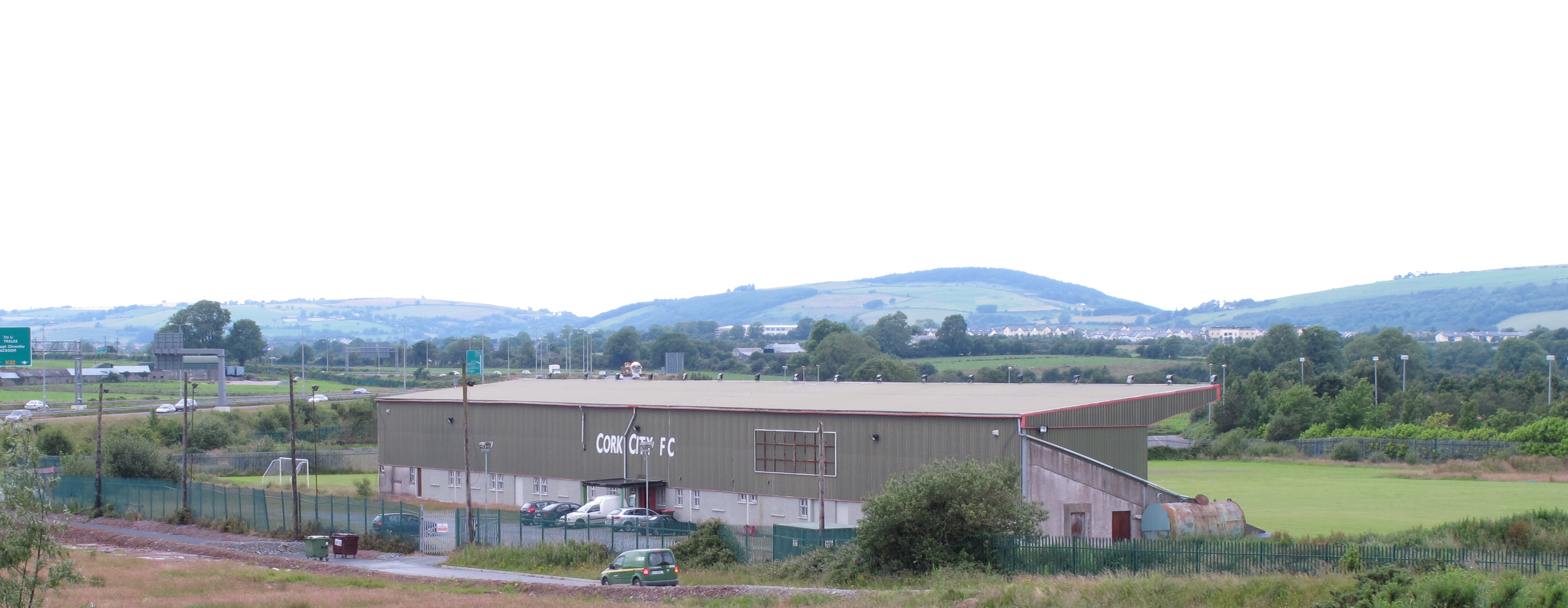
- Interactive map of Bishopstown Stadium
- Location: Curraheen Road, Bishopstown, Cork
- Coordinates: 51°52′28.2″N 8°32′53.6″W
- Owner: McCarthy Developments
- Capacity: 2,000
- Surface: Grass
- Scoreboard: No
- Public transit: Curraheen (Marymount Hospice) bus stop (Bus Éireann route 208)

Construction
- Opened: 1992

Tenants
- Cork City F.C. (Training ground); Cork City Women's F.C. (Former); Cork City FC U19

Bishopstown Stadium is an association football stadium located in Bishopstown on the western outskirts of Cork, Ireland. It is formerly the home ground of League of Ireland men's club Cork City FC and League of Ireland Women's League club Cork City WFC. It is used as a training ground by Cork City.

== History ==
Built in the early 1990s, the stadium was developed as a new home for Cork City F.C. ahead of the 1993–94 season. However, the move to Bishopstown proved costly and unpopular with fans, while the condition of the pitch quickly became "notorious". As the venue was "not fit for purpose", a number of Cork City home games were played in other venues.

By November 1995, and with Cork City on the verge of liquidation, the Football Association of Ireland (FAI) bought the stadium for £70,000 to be shared amongst the club's creditors. Under new ownership, Cork City returned to Turners Cross in 1996.

Property speculators McCarthy Developments then bought the Bishopstown ground and twice tried to turn it into student accommodation serving the Cork Institute of Technology, only to be refused planning permission. They rented the site back to Cork City as a training ground and administrative base in early 2010.

Cork Women's FC began using the facility as their home ground in 2013, as they forged closer links with the owners of the male Cork City club. Cork City Women's FC have played home Women's National League fixtures at Turners Cross since 2022.
