= FORAS (football supporters' trust) =

FORAS is an Irish industrial and provident society established in 2007 to act as a Cork City Football Club supporters' trust. FORAS now operate Cork City, Cork's League of Ireland side. The name is both the Irish language word for foundation and an acronym of Friends Of (the) Rebel Army Society.

== Formation ==
A recruitment drive was launched in September 2008, in the wake of revelations that the club was to enter the examinership process through the Irish courts. Members of the trust include former Lord Mayor of Cork, councillor Brian Bermingham, former Sinn Féin TD Jonathan O'Brien and several other local politicians. Following its establishment, funds were raised via membership fees and donations.

== Resurrection of the club ==
On 23 February 2010, following the winding up and denial of a League of Ireland licence to Cork City Investments Fc Ltd (Cork City FC's holding company), FORAS were granted a First Division licence. They entered under the temporary name Cork City FORAS Co-Op. On 1 June 2010 the club completed the purchase and restoration of the Cork City FC name and history from Cork City Investments FC Ltd's liquidator. The team continued to compete in the League as Cork City FORAS Co-op but the supporters, the club and most Irish media returned to referring to the club as Cork City FC.
