= Rianna Jarrett =

Irish association football player (born 1994)

Personal information
- Full name: Rianna Lauren Jarrett
- Date of birth: 5 July 1994 (age 32)
- Place of birth: Wexford, Ireland
- Height: 1.73 m (5 ft 8 in)
- Position: Forward

Team information
- Current team: Wexford Youths

Youth career
- North End United
- Curracloe United

College career
Years	Team	Apps	(Gls)
2014	UT Martin Skyhawks	20	(17)

Senior career*
Years	Team	Apps	(Gls)
2011–2020	Wexford Youths		(71)
2020–2021	Brighton & Hove Albion	16	(2)
2021–2023	London City Lionesses	12	(4)
2023–	Wexford Youths		

International career^{‡}
2010–2011	Republic of Ireland U17	6	(1)
2012–2013	Republic of Ireland U19	11	(3)
2016–	Republic of Ireland	16	(1)
- * Club domestic league appearances and goals as of 21 January 2021 ‡ National team caps and goals as of 9 November 2021

Rianna Lauren Jarrett (born 5 July 1994) is an Irish professional footballer who plays for Wexford Youths of the Irish Women's National League, and the Republic of Ireland women's national football team. A prolific forward, Jarrett was the Women's National League (WNL) Player of the Season in 2018 and 2019.

== Early life ==
Jarrett's mother Doreen is from Wexford and had met her Jamaican father David while living in England. The family returned to Wexford and Jarrett began playing football for North End United's boys' team alongside her twin brother Jordan and their cousin Robin Dempsey. She was forced to leave the boys' team and briefly played for Curracloe, as well as for a Wexford League select team that entered the FAI Women's Cup.

=== UT Martin Skyhawks ===
Jarrett received an athletic scholarship from the University of Tennessee at Martin to play college soccer for their UT Martin Skyhawks in 2014. Her 17 goals set a new school record and she won the Ohio Valley Conference Offensive Player of the Season. After suffering a serious knee injury in January 2015 Jarrett quit her American studies, switching to the Institute of Technology, Carlow and taking a job with Equifax in Wexford.

== Club career ==
=== Wexford Youths ===
Jarrett joined Wexford Youths for the inaugural Women's National League season in 2011–12.

In 2018 Jarrett scored 27 goals for Wexford Youths and was named WNL Player of the Season as the club won a Treble. In June 2019 she scored five times in Wexford Youths' 6–2 win at Galway WFC, amidst reports that her "sensational form" had brought her to "the verge of a step up in level". She finished the 2019 WNL season as Top Goalscorer and retained her Player of the Season award.

=== Brighton & Hove Albion ===
On 23 January 2020, Jarrett signed a six-month contract with English FA WSL club Brighton & Hove Albion. In her debut for Brighton she scored two goals against Crystal Palace in the FA Women's Cup. The season was ended shortly afterwards due to the coronavirus pandemic, but Jarrett signed an extension to her Brighton contract in July 2020.

=== London City Lionesses ===
Rianna Jarrett signed for London City Lionesses ahead of the 2021–22 FA Women's Championship. She went on to score on her debut for the club against Liverpool in August 2021. In January 2023, she left London City Lionesses via mutual consent.

=== Return to Wexford Youths ===
Following her departure from England, Jarrett returned to Ireland, re-joining her hometown club Wexford Youths.

== International career ==
In 2010, Jarrett was a member of the Republic of Ireland U-17 squad who were runners-up in the 2010 UEFA Women's Under-17 Championship and quarter-finalists in the 2010 FIFA U-17 Women's World Cup.

Jarrett won her first cap for the senior Republic of Ireland national team in March 2016, in a 1–1 draw with Italy at the 2016 Cyprus Cup. She substituted in for Megan Connolly, but nine minutes later suffered an anterior cruciate ligament injury. It was the third such injury of Jarrett's young career, following occasions in April 2013 and January 2015.

In May 2018, Ireland coach Colin Bell recalled Jarrett to the squad for a FIFA Women's World Cup qualifying fixture against Norway. Ireland was eliminated after losing in Stavanger but Jarrett won her second cap as an 83rd-minute substitute.

She scored her first international goal on 8 October 2019, in Ireland's 3–2 UEFA Women's Euro 2021 qualifying Group I win over Ukraine at Tallaght Stadium.
