= Wexford W.F.C. =

Association football club in Ireland

Wexford FC Women
- Full name: Wexford Football Club Women
- Nickname: The Youths
- Ground: Ferrycarrig Park
- Capacity: 2,500 (609 temp seats)
- Manager: Sean Byrne
- League: Women's National League; Women's Under 17 National League
- 2025: 4th
- Website: http://www.wexfordfc.ie/women
Home colours	Away colours

Wexford Football Club Women, formerly known as Wexford Youths Women, is an Irish association football club based in Crossabeg, County Wexford. Their senior team plays in the Women's National League. In the course of women's football in Ireland, Wexford have steadily been one of the league's strongest teams.

As Women's National League winners, they represented Ireland in the UEFA Women's Champions League in Poland in 2015, at home in Wexford in 2016, in Belfast in 2018 and in Lithuania in 2019

== History ==
=== Women's National League ===
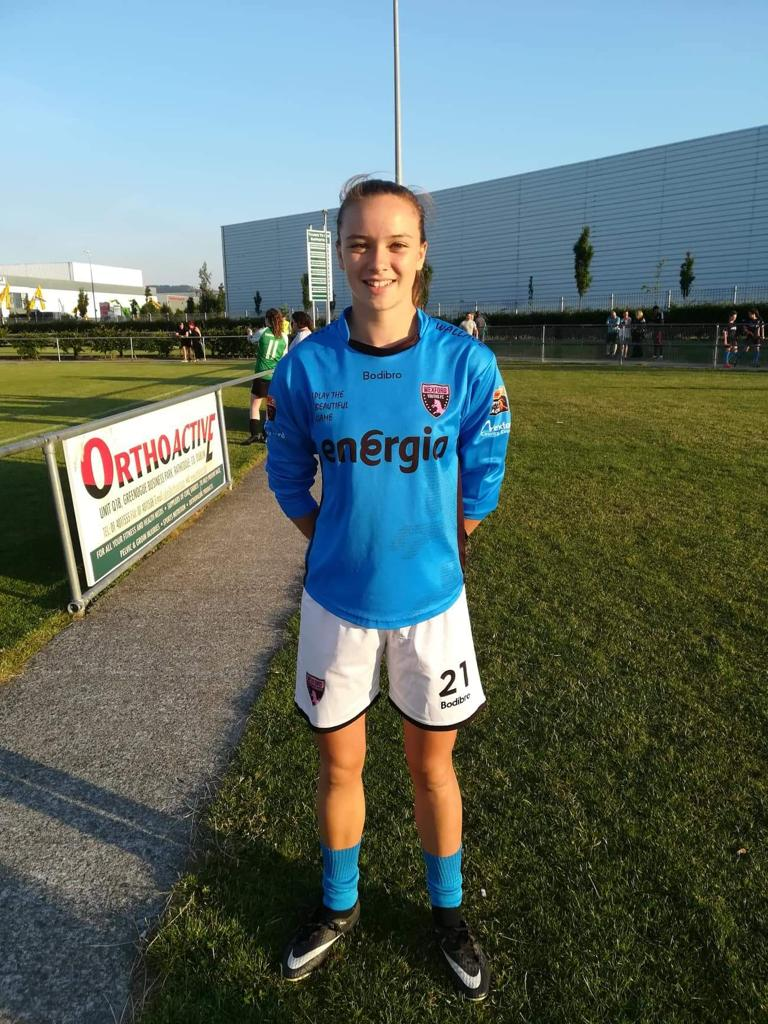
Maeve Williams in Wexford goalkeeper kit, 2018

In 2011–12 Wexford Youths, together with Peamount United, Castlebar Celtic, Cork Women's F.C., Raheny United and Shamrock Rovers, became founder members of the Women's National League. Youths finished third in both 2012–13 and 2013–14. In 2013–14 they also won their first trophy, the WNL Cup, after defeating Castlebar Celtic 3–0 in the final at Ferrycarrig Park. In 2014–15 Youths won their first Women's National League title after finishing two points clear of second placed UCD Waves. The 2015–16 season saw Youths win a treble. They started the season by winning the FAI Women's Cup for the first time. In the final at the Aviva Stadium they defeated Shelbourne Ladies 4–2 on penalties after a 2–2 draw. Shelbourne Ladies would be Youths main challengers throughout the season. The two sides met again in the WNL Shield final, played at Ferrycarrig Park, on 30 March 2016. Wexford Youths again emerged as winners with Edel Kennedy scoring in the 1–0 win. In the league itself, the two teams finished level on points before Wexford Youths retained the title after a play-off. Youths travelled to Galway W.F.C. on Sunday, 8 May knowing a victory would secure them the league title. However Youths dropped their first league points away from home and could only manage a 1–1 draw. Youths had a second chance to clinch the title when they played Shelbourne Ladies at Tolka Park on Wednesday, 11 May. However Shelbourne Ladies won 3–1 and as a result finished level on points with Youths. This meant the title would be decided by a play-off for the first time. The play-off took place on Sunday, 22 May at Tallaght Stadium. It proved third time lucky for Wexford Youths as they finally secured the title with a 2–1 win. Shortly after guiding Youths to their second title, head coach Will Doyle announced he was resigning.

In June 2016, Gary Hunt was named as the new senior women's team manager, having been a coach under Will Doyle for the previous two years.

After one season in charge, Gary Hunt stepped down as manager of the club, replaced by former assistant manager Laura Heffernan.

In 2017 Heffernan secured Wexford Youths Women their third WNL title in 4 years, stepping down at the end of the season.

She was followed by Tom Elmes at the beginning of the 2018 Season. He guided the team to the treble that year and UEFA Women's Champions League qualification in 2019, The following year the team won the Senior cup in the Aviva stadium under Tom Elmes. Elmes departed in July 2021 to be appointed as Ireland's WU16 head coach and the Women's Senior team assistant coach to Vera Pauw. He was replaced by his assistant Stephen Quinn.

In the season 2021 the team finished 3rd in the league and won the Women's Senior Cup under the leadership of Stephen Quinn.

Stephen Quinn departed the club mid-season in 2023 after an unsuccessful spell. The club appointed Hugh Strong as its new manager ahead of the 2024 season.

In 2024, Wexford Youths Women completed a rebrand of the club, dropping the 'Youths' from their name and becoming Wexford F.C. Women.

== Players ==
=== Current squad ===
As of 30 January 2026

Note: Flags indicate national team as defined under FIFA eligibility rules; some limited exceptions apply. Players may hold more than one non-FIFA nationality.

No.	Pos.	Nation	Player
1	GK	IRL	Maria O'Sullivan
2	DF	IRL	Grace Fitzpatrick-Ryan
4	DF	IRL	Emma Bucci
5	DF	IRL	Lauren Dwyer
7	MF	IRL	Becky Cassin
8	DF	CAN	Kayla Gonçalves
9	FW	IRL	Leah McGrath
10	FW	CAN	Christie Gray
11	FW	IRL	Lauren Kelly
12	DF	IRL	Ciara Rossiter

No.	Pos.	Nation	Player
16	MF	IRL	Megan Smyth-Lynch
18	MF	USA	Devon Olive
20	MF	IRL	Freya De Mange
21	GK	IRL	Claudia Keenan
23	DF	IRL	Lauren Walsh
24	MF	CAN	Courtney Chochol
26	DF	USA	Anna Carson
35	MF	IRL	Molly Kirwan
36	DF	IRL	Aisling Roche

=== Republic of Ireland women's internationals ===
- (Republic of Ireland) Cherelle Khassal
- (Republic of Ireland) Claire O'Riordan
- (Republic of Ireland) Rianna Jarrett
- (Republic of Ireland) Ellen Molloy
- (Republic of Ireland) Nicola Sinnott

== Wexford Youths in Europe ==
=== 2015–16 UEFA Women's Champions League ===
After winning the 2014–15 Women's National League title, Wexford Youths qualified for UEFA Women's Champions League for the first time. They played in Group 7 and finished second after winning two out of three games.

Pos	Team	Pld	W	D	L	GF	GA	GD	Pts	Qualification
1	(Poland) Medyk Konin (H)	3	3	0	0	15	0	+15	9	Advanced to knockout phase
2	(Republic of Ireland) Wexford Youths	3	2	0	1	6	7	−1	6	
3	(Lithuania) Gintra Universitetas	3	1	0	2	5	6	−1	3	
4	(Wales) Cardiff Met.	3	0	0	3	2	15	−13	0	

Source: UEFA
(H) Hosts
11 August 2015
15:30

Gintra Universitetas (Lithuania)	0–1	(Republic of Ireland) Wexford Youths
	Report	Gleeson 67'

Kleczew Stadium, Kleczew
Attendance: 300
Referee: Eleni Lampadariou (Greece)

13 August 2015
18:00

Wexford Youths (Republic of Ireland)	0–6	(Poland) Medyk Konin
	Report	Daleszczyk 5', 82'; Sikora 18'; Balcerzak 67', 84'; Tarczyńska 86'

Stadion im. Złotej Jedenastki, Konin
Attendance: 380
Referee: Ana Minić (Serbia)

16 August 2015
17:00

Cardiff Met. (Wales)	1–5	(Republic of Ireland) Wexford Youths
Allen 60'	Report	Breen 3', 6', 42', 80'; Cassin 30'

Kleczew Stadium, Kleczew
Attendance: 250
Referee: Ivana Martinčić (Croatia)

=== 2016–17 UEFA Women's Champions League ===
After winning the 2015–16 Women's National League title, Wexford Youths qualified for UEFA Women's Champions League for a second time. Wexford Youths have been announced as hosts of one of the group stage tournaments with games due to be played at both Ferrycarrig Park and the Waterford Regional Sports Centre.

Group 7

Pos	Team	Pld	W	D	L	GF	GA	GD	Pts	Qualification	KAZ	GIN	WEX	CRI
1	(Kazakhstan) BIIK Kazygurt	3	3	0	0	9	1	+8	9	Knockout phase	—	—	3–1	3–0
2	(Lithuania) Gintra Universitetas	3	2	0	1	15	4	+11	6		0–3	—	—	13–0
3	(Republic of Ireland) Wexford Youths (H)	3	0	1	2	2	5	−3	1		—	1–2	—	—
4	(Moldova) ARF Criuleni	3	0	1	2	0	16	−16	1		—	—	0–0	—

Source: UEFA
(H) Hosts

== Honours ==
- Women's National League
  - Winners: 2014–15, 2015–16, 2017, 2018: 4
- FAI Women's Cup
  - Winners: 2015, 2018, 2019, 2021: 4
  - Runners-up: 2016: 1
- WNL Cup
  - Winners: 2013–14 1
  - Runners-up: 2018, 2019: 2
- WNL Shield
  - Winners: 2015–16, 2018 2
- All-Island Cup
  - Winners: 2025 1
