= League of Ireland Women's Premier Division =

Association football league in the Republic of Ireland

- First season: 2023
- Country: Ireland
- Confederation: UEFA
- Number of clubs: 12
- Domestic cup: FAI Women's Cup
- International cup: UEFA Champions League
- Current champions: Athlone Town (3rd title)
- Most championships: Peamount United; Wexford (4 titles each)
- Broadcaster(s): TG4 (Domestic); LOITV (Global)
- Website: leagueofireland.ie
- Current: 2026 Women's Premier Division

The League of Ireland Women's Premier Division (sponsor name SSE Airtricity League Women's Premier Division) is a professional women's association football league in Ireland, organised by the League of Ireland, which began play in the 2023 season. The league consists of twelve teams, eight of which are owned by clubs with men's teams in the League of Ireland's Premier Division or First Division. The winners of the league qualify for the first round of the UEFA Women's Champions League in the following season.

The Women's Premier Division is the fourth incarnation of a national women's league at the highest level of the Republic of Ireland football league system, and the first fully-professional incarnation. It is the successor to the FAI- and FAIW-run Ladies League of Ireland, which ran in two incarnations from 1973 to 1979, and from 1987 to 1989; and the Women's National League (Irish: Sraith Náisiúnta na mBan), which ran from 2011 to 2022.

== History ==
=== Women's League of Ireland ===
The FAI/WFAI first organised a women's national league in 1973. It was known as the Ladies League of Ireland or the Women's League of Ireland. Twelve teams were originally invited to participate. These included several teams associated with clubs in the men's League of Ireland such as Dundalk, Finn Harps, Cork Celtic, Limerick and Sligo Rovers. Others included Benfica (Waterford), Evergreen (Kilkenny), Avengers (Dublin), Cahir Park (Tipperary) and three teams from Galway – Beejays, Happy Wanderers and Wasps. The league started in March 1973 and teams played thirty five minute halves. As the league got started, there were some changes and dropouts. Cahir Park defeated Elms United, a fourth team from Galway, 1–0 at West Park, Galway, in the very first Ladies League of Ireland game on Sunday, 4 March 1973. Evergreen (Kilkenny) withdrew after losing their first three games, although a Kilkenny team did compete in the 1974 season. Benfica played an away game at Finn Harps as part of a double header before a 1972–73 League of Ireland game between Finn Harps and Waterford. Limerick finished the 1973 season as champions after going unbeaten in a fifteen match series. In a post season friendly they lost 3–1 to a touring Stade de Reims at Markets Field.

By 1979 the Ladies League of Ireland featured seven teams with approximately 120 active players. The original Ladies League of Ireland subsequently went into demise but was relaunched in April 1987. This time its members included Cork Rangers, Cork Celtic, Benfica, Greenpark (Limerick) and Dublin Castle and games featured forty minute halves. Eamonn Darcy, a former manager of the Republic of Ireland women's national football team, served as vice-president of the league. The revived league was sponsored by Hotpoint and Cork Rangers were the 1987 champions. Dublin Castle were the 1988 champions after defeating Greenpark (Limerick) 3–1 in a play-off. However the revived Ladies League of Ireland lasted just three seasons and was abandoned in 1989.

In 1996 there was an unsuccessful attempt to launch a third Ladies League of Ireland. Proposed members included a Mayo Ladies League representative team and Longford Strikers. During the 1990s and 2000s, in the absence of an official national league, the Dublin Women's Soccer League developed into a de facto national league. The Women's Soccer Colleges Association of Ireland (WSCAI) also organised a national league featuring women's teams representing universities and third level colleges from both the Republic of Ireland and Northern Ireland. Both of these leagues featured future members of the Women's National League. Peamount United, Raheny United, Shamrock Rovers and Shelbourne Ladies were all members of the DWSL while UCD fielded teams in both leagues.

=== Women's National League ===
The Women's National League was formed in 2011–12. Originally seven clubs were invited to join the league. These included Peamount United, Castlebar Celtic, Cork Women's F.C., Raheny United, Shamrock Rovers, Wexford Youths and Bray Wanderers/St. Joseph's. The league was launched with financial support from UEFA. Twenty-six clubs had originally applied to join the league before the final seven were chosen. However, due to a lack of playing resources, Bray Wanderers/St Joseph's had to withdraw before the season started. Peamount United were the inaugural league champions, finishing three points clear of second placed Raheny United. Peamount United also completed a league double by winning the WNL Cup, defeating Shamrock Rovers 1–0 in the final. The following two seasons, 2012–13 and 2013–14, saw Raheny United finish as league champions. The league received international publicity in October 2013 when Stephanie Roche scored an acclaimed goal for Peamount United against Wexford Youths which subsequently went viral on YouTube. Footage of the goal was uploaded to the internet by team manager Eileen Gleeson as the matches were not televised. Together with James Rodríguez and Robin van Persie, Roche was subsequently nominated for the 2014 FIFA Puskás Award. At the 2014 FIFA Ballon d'Or awards ceremony on 12 January 2015, Roche finished second to Rodríguez with 33% of the vote. In 2014–15 Wexford Youths were league champions and in 2015–16 they retained the title after defeating Shelbourne Ladies in a play-off.

==== Summer League & Professionalism ====
In 2016 a shortened transitional season was played from August to December where each team played 14 matches. From 2017 the league was restructured into a summer league, while a possible new team from Sligo entered into talks to join.

The league celebrated its 10th year in 2021 with a new sponsor (SSE Airtricity). This was the first year it shared the same sponsor as the men's League of Ireland. In late 2022, ahead of the 2023 season, the league announced the introduction of professional contracts, with the same minimum wage regulations as male players in the League of Ireland. This change also enabled the introduction of loan players into the WNL from other professional leagues. Although professional contracts were subject to a minimum wage, they were not mandatory and clubs retained the option to register full-time, part-time or amateur players.

== Expansions, name changes and withdrawals ==
DLR Waves joined the league in 2012–13 and Galway were added for the 2013–14 season. Before the 2014–15 season Cork Women's F.C. were taken over by FORAS/Cork City and as a result were renamed Cork City W.F.C. It was also announced that DLR Waves and UCD's senior women's team would join forces and become known as UCD Waves. Shamrock Rovers also withdrew from the league, leaving seven teams to play each other. In January 2015 the FAI sent out invitations to clubs in an effort to expand the league. This resulted in Kilkenny United joining the league for the 2015–16 season. In 2015 the senior women's team at Raheny United merged with Shelbourne Ladies. This effectively saw Shelbourne Ladies takeover Raheny United's place in the league. Before the 2015–16 season was finished Castlebar Celtic withdrew from league because they were unable to field a team.

In 2018, Limerick joined, bringing the total number back up to eight, however, in December 2019 the club was on the verge of extinction after the examinership process to try to keep their trading company afloat ended unsuccessfully and the club did not receive a licence for the 2020 season.

The Women's National League Committee decided to expand the 2020 WNL to nine teams. Bohemians' application was successful, while Treaty United's application to enter the WNL in place of Limerick was also accepted. Both teams and Athlone Town joined the WNL for the first time that year. Kilkenny United were excluded for a variety of reasons, including that they had not bonded with the local league, they had changed venues for home games, did not train in Kilkenny, lacked a qualified manager, and had produced poor results (just seven points from 60 matches in the last three seasons).

In December 2021, Sligo Rovers announced they would join the senior level of the Women's National League for the upcoming 2022 season, having previously competed at U-17 and U-19 level. This brought the league's total membership up to ten clubs.

In November 2022, the WNL announced that Shamrock Rovers and Galway United would enter teams for the 2023 season after confirming earlier in September that Galway W.F.C would not participate.

In late 2024, Waterford confirmed they had been awarded a licence to enter a women's team for the 2025 season.

== Teams ==
Locations of Premier Division teams

2026 League of Ireland Women's Premier Division teams
Club	Town / City	Stadium	Capacity
Athlone Town	Athlone	Athlone Town Stadium	5,000
Bohemians	Dublin (Phibsborough)	Dalymount Park	4,900
Cork City	Cork	Turner's Cross	7,485
DLR Waves	Dublin (Dún Laoghaire)	UCD Bowl	3,000
Galway United	Galway	Eamonn Deacy Park	5,000
Peamount United	Dublin (Newcastle)	Greenogue	N/A
Shamrock Rovers	Dublin (Tallaght)	Tallaght Stadium	10,547
Shelbourne	Dublin (Drumcondra)	Tolka Park	4,400
Sligo Rovers	Sligo	The Showgrounds	3,873
Treaty United	Limerick	Markets Field	4,500
Waterford	Waterford	RSC	5,160
Wexford	Crossabeg	Ferrycarrig Park	2,500

== Television Coverage ==
TG4 became the first national broadcaster to cover the league, agreeing a deal in September 2021 to show four live matches free-to-air. The first live game was broadcast from Tolka Park on 2 October 2021 with hosts Shelbourne beating DLR Waves 1-0 and Alex Kavanagh scoring the only goal. By 2024, coverage on TG4 had expanded to 12 live matches a season with games available globally via the league's own TV channel, LOITV. In 2025, TG4 increased coverage of the Women's Premier Division to 13 live matches per season.

== Sponsorship ==
Between 2011–12 and the end of the 2013–14 season the league was sponsored by Bus Éireann. On 20 August 2014, at the Aviva Stadium, Continental Tyres were unveiled as the new title sponsor of the Women's National League and FAI Women's Cup, as part of a wider sponsorship deal for women's association football in the Republic of Ireland. On 5 March 2019 the ninth season of the Women's National League was launched and Só Hotels unveiled as the new sponsors. In 2020 the League lacked a title sponsor, as Só Hotels did not renew their agreement from the previous season. Barretstown were announced as a "charity partner" on 24 July 2020.

In January 2021 the League attracted a new title sponsor, as SSE Airtricity agreed a two-year renewal of their existing deal with the (men's) League of Ireland and extended it to also cover the WNL. The Bank of Ireland also signed a three-year deal as an associate sponsor of the League of Ireland and WNL.

Period	Sponsor	Brand
2011–2013	Bus Éireann	Bus Éireann Women's National League
2014–2018	Continental Tyres	Continental Tyres Women's National League
2019	Só Hotels	Só Hotels Women's National League
2020	–	Women's National League
2021–	SSE Airtricity	SSE Airtricity Women's National League

== Champions ==
By club

Club	Titles	Seasons
Peamount United	4	2011–12, 2019, 2020, 2023
Wexford Youths	4	2014–15, 2015–16, 2017, 2018
Shelbourne	3	2016, 2021, 2022
Athlone Town	3	2024, 2025, 2026
Raheny United	2	2012–13, 2013–14

By season

Season	Winner	Runners-up	Third place	Top scorer	Goals
2011–12	Peamount United (1)	Raheny United	Cork Women's F.C.	Stephanie Roche (Peamount United)	24
2012–13	Raheny United (1)	Peamount United	Wexford Youths	Sara Lawlor (Peamount United)	28
2013–14	Raheny United (2)	Peamount United	Wexford Youths	Stephanie Roche (Peamount United)	
2014–15	Wexford Youths (1)	UCD Waves	Raheny United	Áine O'Gorman (UCD Waves)	25
2015–16	Wexford Youths (2)	Shelbourne	UCD Waves	Áine O'Gorman (UCD Waves)	17
2016	Shelbourne (1)	UCD Waves	Peamount United	Amber Barrett (Peamount United)	16
2017	Wexford Youths (3)	Peamount United	Shelbourne	Amber Barrett (Peamount United)	16
2018	Wexford Youths (4)	Shelbourne	Peamount United	Amber Barrett (Peamount United)	30
2019	Peamount United (2)	Shelbourne	Wexford Youths	Rianna Jarrett (Wexford Youths)	26
2020	Peamount United (3)	Shelbourne	Wexford Youths	Áine O'Gorman (Peamount United)	14
2021	Shelbourne (2)	Peamount United	Wexford Youths	Áine O'Gorman (Peamount United)	16
2022	Shelbourne (3)	Athlone Town	Peamount United	Áine O'Gorman (Peamount United)	22
2023	Peamount United (4)	Shelbourne	Shamrock Rovers	Dana Scheriff (Athlone)	13
2024	Athlone Town (1)	Shelbourne	Galway United	Jenna Slattery (Galway)	10
2025	Athlone Town (2)	Shelbourne	Galway United	Kelly Brady (Athlone)	20
2026	Athlone Town (3)				

== Related competitions ==
=== WNL Cup ===
Year	Winner	Result	Runner-up	Venue
2011–12	Peamount United	1–0	Shamrock Rovers	Tallaght Stadium
2012–13	Peamount United	6–3	Castlebar Celtic	Milebush Park, Castlebar
2013–14	Wexford Youths	3–0	Castlebar Celtic	Ferrycarrig Park
2014–15	Raheny United	3–2 (a.e.t.)	Peamount United	Tolka Park
2015–16	Shelbourne	3–2	UCD Waves	Richmond Park
2017	Shelbourne	1–1 (a.e.t.) (5–4 pen.)	Peamount United	Greenogue
2018	Peamount United	2–1	Wexford Youths	Ferrycarrig Park
2019	Shelbourne	1–0	Wexford Youths	Ferrycarrig Park
2020	Deferred due to the COVID-19 pandemic			

=== WNL Shield ===
Year	Winner	Result	Runner-up	Venue
2015–16	Wexford Youths	1–0	Shelbourne	Ferrycarrig Park

== See also ==
- League of Ireland Women's Under 17 Division
