= Dora Gorman =

Irish footballer (born 1993)

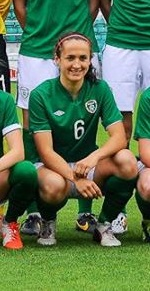
- Gorman before a 2015 World Cup qualifier against Croatia

Personal information
- Full name: Dora Gorman
- Date of birth: 18 February 1993 (age 33)
- Place of birth: Barna, County Galway, Ireland
- Height: 1.68 m (5 ft 6 in)
- Position: Midfielder

Youth career
- Salthill Devon

College career
Years	Team	Apps	(Gls)
2011–2018	UCD		

Senior career*
Years	Team	Apps	(Gls)
2010	Salthill Devon		
2011–2014	Peamount United		
2014–2016	UCD Waves		
2020–2023	Peamount United		

International career
2011–2014	Republic of Ireland	16	
- * Club domestic league appearances and goals

Dora Gorman (born 18 February 1993) is an Irish radiologist and former footballer who played as a midfielder for Peamount United of the Women's National League (WNL). In 2010, she was captain of the Republic of Ireland U-17 squad who were runners-up in the 2010 UEFA Women's Under-17 Championship and quarter-finalists in the 2010 FIFA U-17 Women's World Cup. As well as being a medical doctor, Gorman is an all-round sportswoman. She has also represented the Ireland women's national field hockey team at various levels and has played senior inter-county ladies' Gaelic football for the Galway county team.

== Early years ==
Gorman grew up in Barna, County Galway and is the daughter of Michael and Margaret Gorman. She attended Dominican College, Taylor's Hill, Galway where she studied for her Leaving Cert. In 2011, she was awarded a medal for achieving the joint highest mark in the Leaving Certificate Physics Examination in the Republic of Ireland. While still at school, Gorman played association football with Salthill Devon, Gaelic football with Salthill-Knocknacarra GAA and field hockey with Greenfields Hockey Club. Gorman represented Galway GAA at under-12, under-14 and under-16 levels. In July 2010 Gorman played for Galway in the All-Ireland Under-18 Ladies' Football Championship final, scoring 1–1 as she helped them defeat a Donegal GAA team that featured Ciara Grant. Together with Julie-Ann Russell, Gorman also played Gaelic football for Galway at senior level in the Ladies' National Football League. Gorman also played for the Ireland women's national field hockey team at under-16 and under-18 level as well as for the development A team. She was initially selected to represent Ireland at the 2010 Summer Youth Olympics but subsequently had to withdraw due to other sporting commitments.

== Club career ==
=== Salthill Devon ===
In 2007, together with Julie-Ann Russell, Gorman was a member of the Salthill Devon team that won the Under 16 Girls FAI Cup. In the final at Tolka Park, Salthill Devon defeated Stella Maris 3–2 after extra–time. In 2008 Gorman and Salthill Devon retained the cup after defeating St Joseph's 6–0 in final. In 2010 Gorman was also a member of the Salthill Devon squad that reached the FAI Women's Cup final, although she did not play the final itself.

=== Peamount United ===
Between 2011 and 2014 Gorman played for Peamount United in the Women's National League. She played for United during 2011–12 UEFA Women's Champions League campaign and during the inaugural 2011–12 Women's National League season. Gorman scored twice during the regular season as United won the title, finishing three points clear of second placed Raheny United. United also completed a league double by winning the WNL Cup. Gorman missed much of 2012–13 season because of injury but returned in 2013–14 to help United finish as league runners-up.

=== UCD Waves ===
In 2011 Gorman began studying medicine at University College Dublin. Gorman also played association football for UCD at intervarsity level, playing in teams alongside Julie-Ann Russell, Siobhán Killeen and Ciara Grant. In the 2013–14 season Gorman helped UCD win the WSCAI Premier Division. In 2014–15 when UCD Waves entered a team in the Women's National League, they also appointed the former Peamount United manager Eileen Gleeson to take charge of the team. Gorman was one of several United players to follow Gleeson to Waves. Others included Aine O'Gorman, Karen Duggan, Julie-Ann Russell, Chloe Mustaki and Emily Cahill. Gorman also played for the UCD ladies hockey team that won the 2012 Irish Senior Cup. Her teammates included Chloe Watkins, Deirdre Duke and Anna O'Flanagan. She graduated with her medical degree in 2018 and began working at the Mater Hospital, but her sporting activities had already been put on hold for more than a year while she attended work placements in England and America. In 2019 she played Gaelic football for Galway.

=== Return to Peamount ===
In November 2020, Gorman made a playing comeback with Peamount United. She was a 77th-minute substitute for Niamh Farrelly in a 3–0 home win over Cork City. It was her first appearance in the Women's National League for more than four years.

== International career ==
Gorman has represented the Republic of Ireland at under-15, under-17, under-19, university and senior level. In 2010 Gorman captained a Republic of Ireland U-17 squad that featured Megan Campbell, Siobhán Killeen, Denise O'Sullivan, Ciara Grant and Clare Shine and finished as runners-up in the 2010 UEFA Women's Under-17 Championship and quarter-finalists in the 2010 FIFA U-17 Women's World Cup. Gorman made her senior international debut on 22 October 2011, in a UEFA Women's Euro 2013 qualifier against Israel at Tallaght Stadium. She created the Republic of Ireland's second goal for Ciara Grant a minute after coming on as an 86th-minute substitute. In December 2011, together with Julie-Ann Russell, Louise Quinn, Grace Murray, Karen Duggan, Megan Campbell and Ciara Grant, Gorman was included in an FAI scholarship programme for potential senior women's internationals. Gorman has subsequently represented the Republic of Ireland during their 2015 FIFA Women's World Cup and UEFA Women's Euro 2017 qualifying campaigns. Gorman also represented Ireland at the 2013 and 2015 Summer Universiades.

== Honours ==
=== Association football ===
Individual

- FAI International Football Awards Under-17 Women's International Player of the Year
  - 2009

Peamount United

- Women's National League
  - Winners: 2011–12: 1
  - Runners-up: 2012–13, 2013–14: 2
- WNL Cup
  - Winners: 2012, 2013: 2

UCD Waves/UCD

- Women's National League
  - Runners-up: 2014–15: 1
- FAI Women's Cup
  - Runners-up: 2014: 1
- WNL Cup
  - Runners-up: 2016: 1
- WSCAI Premier Division
  - Winners: 2013–14: 1

Salthill Devon

- FAI Women's Cup
  - Runners-up: 2010
- Under 16 Girls FAI Cup
  - Winners: 2007, 2008: 2

Republic of Ireland U-17

- UEFA Women's Under-17 Championship
  - Runner Up: 2010

=== Gaelic football ===
Individual

- Connacht Young Player of the Year
  - 2008

Galway

- All-Ireland Under-18 Ladies' Football Championship
  - Winners: 2010

=== Field Hockey ===
Individual

- IHA U-18 Player of the Year
  - 2010

UCD

- Irish Senior Cup
  - 2012
