= Julie-Ann Russell =

Irish footballer (born 1991)

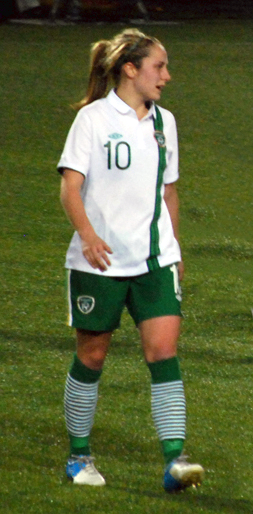
- Russell with Ireland in 2012

Personal information
- Full name: Julie-Ann Russell
- Date of birth: 28 March 1991 (age 35)
- Place of birth: County Galway, Ireland
- Height: 1.64 m (5 ft 5 in)
- Positions: Winger; forward

Team information
- Current team: Galway
- Number: 8

Youth career
- Salthill Devon

College career
Years	Team	Apps	(Gls)
2009–2013	University of Limerick		
2013–2014	UCD		

Senior career*
Years	Team	Apps	(Gls)
2007–2011	Salthill Devon		
2011	Los Angeles Strikers	13	(1)
2011–2014	Peamount United		
2012	→ Doncaster Rovers Belles	5	(0)
2014–2017	UCD Waves		
2017–2020	Sydney University		
2020–2021	Western Sydney Wanderers	10	(1)
2021–2022	Galway	34	(3)
2023–2024	Galway United W.F.C.	20	(9)

International career^{‡}
2009–2024	Republic of Ireland	58	(7)
- * Club domestic league appearances and goals as of 4 March 2021 ‡ National team caps and goals as of 17:00, 23 June 2016 (UTC)

Julie-Ann Russell (born 28 March 1991) is an Irish retired footballer who played for Women's National League club Galway United W.F.C.

In 2014, Russell was voted both FAI Senior Women's International Player of the Year and the Women's National League Senior Player of the Year. Russell has played in three FAI Women's Cup finals for three different teams – the Galway Ladies League, Salthill Devon and UCD Waves. Russell has also played ladies' Gaelic football at a senior level for both Galway and Connacht.

== Early years ==
Russell grew up in Moycullen, County Galway where she attended Scoil Mhuire Maigh Cuilinn. Her older brother, John is also a former association footballer and played in the League of Ireland and is the current manager of Sligo Rovers.

== Club career ==
=== Salthill Devon ===
In 2007, together with Dora Gorman, Russell was a member of the Salthill Devon team that won the Under 16 Girls FAI Cup. In the final at Tolka Park, Russell scored the winner in a 3–2 extra–time win over Stella Maris. The following week, together with several Salthill Devon teammates including Niamh Fahey and Méabh De Búrca, Russell helped the Galway Ladies League win the 2007 FAI Women's Cup, defeating Raheny United 1–0 in the final at Dalymount Park. Russell subsequently played for Galway in the 2008–09 UEFA Women's Cup. In 2010 Russell played in her second FAI Women's Cup final, this time with Salthill Devon who lost 4–2 to Peamount United. As well as playing for Salthill Devon, Russell and several of her teammates, including Dora Gorman, also played Gaelic football for Galway in the Ladies' National Football League. Russell also played for Connacht at interprovincial level.

=== University of Limerick ===
Between 2009 and 2013 Russell attended the Kemmy Business School at the University of Limerick where she gained a Business Studies and Marketing, 1st Class Honours degree. Together with Karen Duggan, Russell also played for the UL association football team that won the 2010 WSCAI Intervarsities Cup. They defeated a UCD team that featured Louise Quinn 2–1 in the final at Turners Cross. Duggan and Russell also helped the team win the WSCAI Premier Division in 2010–11. They also played for the UL ladies futsal team that won the 2011 WSCAI National Futsal Intervarsities title. In 2011 Russell played for Los Angeles Strikers in the USL W-League, forming a strike partnership with Cherelle Khassal. In 2012 Russell completed a nine-month internship with Doncaster Rovers Belles in the FA WSL, fulfilling the work placement element of her UL degree. In addition to playing for Belles, she also worked for Doncaster Rovers F.C. in their marketing department as a digital ambassador. Russell was appointed as one of several FA WSL digital media ambassadors who wore their Twitter account name on their shirt sleeves to raise the profile of the league.

=== Peamount United ===
Russell, along with fellow UL student Karen Duggan, began playing for Peamount United in August 2011 and subsequently played for the club in their 2011–12 UEFA Women's Champions League campaign and during the inaugural 2011–12 Women's National League season. Russell also helped United win the WNL Cup in 2012–13. While playing for United, Russell was twice selected for the WNL Team of the Season in 2012–13 and 2013–14. In the latter season she was also named Senior Player of the Year.

=== UCD Waves ===
Between 2013 and 2014 Russell attended the Michael Smurfit Graduate Business School at University College Dublin where she achieved an Honours master's degree in marketing. Russell also played association football for UCD at intervarsity level, playing in teams alongside Dora Gorman, Siobhán Killeen and Ciara Grant. During the 2013–14 season Russell helped UCD win the WSCAI Futsal Cup and the WSCAI Premier Division. In 2014–15 when UCD Waves entered a team in the Women's National League, they also appointed the former Peamount United manager Eileen Gleeson to take charge of the team. Russell was one of several United players to follow Gleeson to Waves. Others included Aine O'Gorman, Karen Duggan, Dora Gorman, Chloe Mustaki and Emily Cahill. In 2015 Russell also started working as a Bing ads account manager for Microsoft.

=== Western Sydney Wanderers ===
In December 2020, Russell joined W-League club Western Sydney Wanderers.

== International career ==
Russell has represented the Republic of Ireland at under-15, under-17, under-19, university and senior level. In December 2011, together with Dora Gorman, Megan Campbell, Ciara Grant, Louise Quinn, Grace Murray and Karen Duggan, Russell was included in an FAI scholarship programme for potential senior women's internationals. Russell made her senior international debut on 29 October 2009, when she came on as a half–time substitute for Marie Curtin during a 2011 FIFA Women's World Cup qualifier against Kazakhstan. She created the Republic of Ireland's equalising goal in their 2–1 win. She has subsequently represented the Republic of Ireland during their UEFA Women's Euro 2013, 2015 FIFA Women's World Cup and UEFA Women's Euro 2017 qualifying campaigns. Russell also represented the Republic of Ireland at the 2012 Algarve Cup and in Cyprus Cup tournaments. Russell also represented Ireland at the 2013 and 2015 Summer Universiades.

== International goals ==
Scores and results list Republic of Ireland's goal tally first.

No.	Date	Venue	Opponent	Score	Result	Competition
1.	7 March 2012	Estádio Municipal de Quarteira, Quarteira, Portugal	Hungary	2–0	2–1	2012 Algarve Cup
2.	19 September 2012	Ramat Gan Stadium, Ramat Gan, Israel	Israel	2–0	2–0	UEFA Women's Euro 2013 qualifying
3.	22 September 2013	Tallaght Stadium, Dublin, Ireland	Slovakia	1–0	2–0	2015 FIFA Women's World Cup qualification
4.	20 August 2014	Tallaght Stadium, Dublin, Ireland	Slovenia	1–0	2–0	2015 FIFA Women's World Cup qualification
5.	12 July 2024	Carrow Road, Norwich, England	England	1–2	1–2	UEFA Women's Euro 2025 qualifying
6.	16 July 2024	Páirc Uí Chaoimh, Cork, Ireland	France	2–0	3–1	UEFA Women's Euro 2025 qualifying
7.	29 October 2024	Tallaght Stadium, Dublin, Ireland	Georgia	1–0	3–0	UEFA Women's Euro 2025 qualifying play-offs

== Honours ==
=== Association football ===
Individual

- FAI International Football Awards Senior Women's International Player of the Year
  - 2014
- FAI International Football Awards Under-19 Women's International Player of the Year
  - 2009
- Women's National League Senior Player of the Year
  - 2013–14
- Women's National League Team of the Season
  - 2012–13, 2013–14

Peamount United

- Women's National League
  - Winners: 2011–12: 1
  - Runners-up: 2012–13, 2013–14: 2
- WNL Cup
  - Winners: 2012, 2013: 2
- FAI Women's Cup
  - Runners-up: 2012: 1

UCD Waves/UCD

- Women's National League
  - Runners-up: 2014–15
- FAI Women's Cup
  - Runners-up: 2014: 1
- WNL Cup
  - Runners-up: 2016: 1
- WSCAI Premier Division
  - Winners: 2013–14
- WSCAI Futsal Cup
  - Winners: 2014

Salthill Devon

- FAI Women's Cup
  - Runners-up: 2010

Galway Ladies League

- FAI Women's Cup
  - Winners: 2007

University of Limerick

- WSCAI Premier Division
  - Winners: 2010–11
- WSCAI Intervarsities Cup
  - Winners: 2010
- WSCAI National Futsal Intervarsities
  - Winners: 2011
