= Áine O'Gorman =

Irish footballer (born 1989)

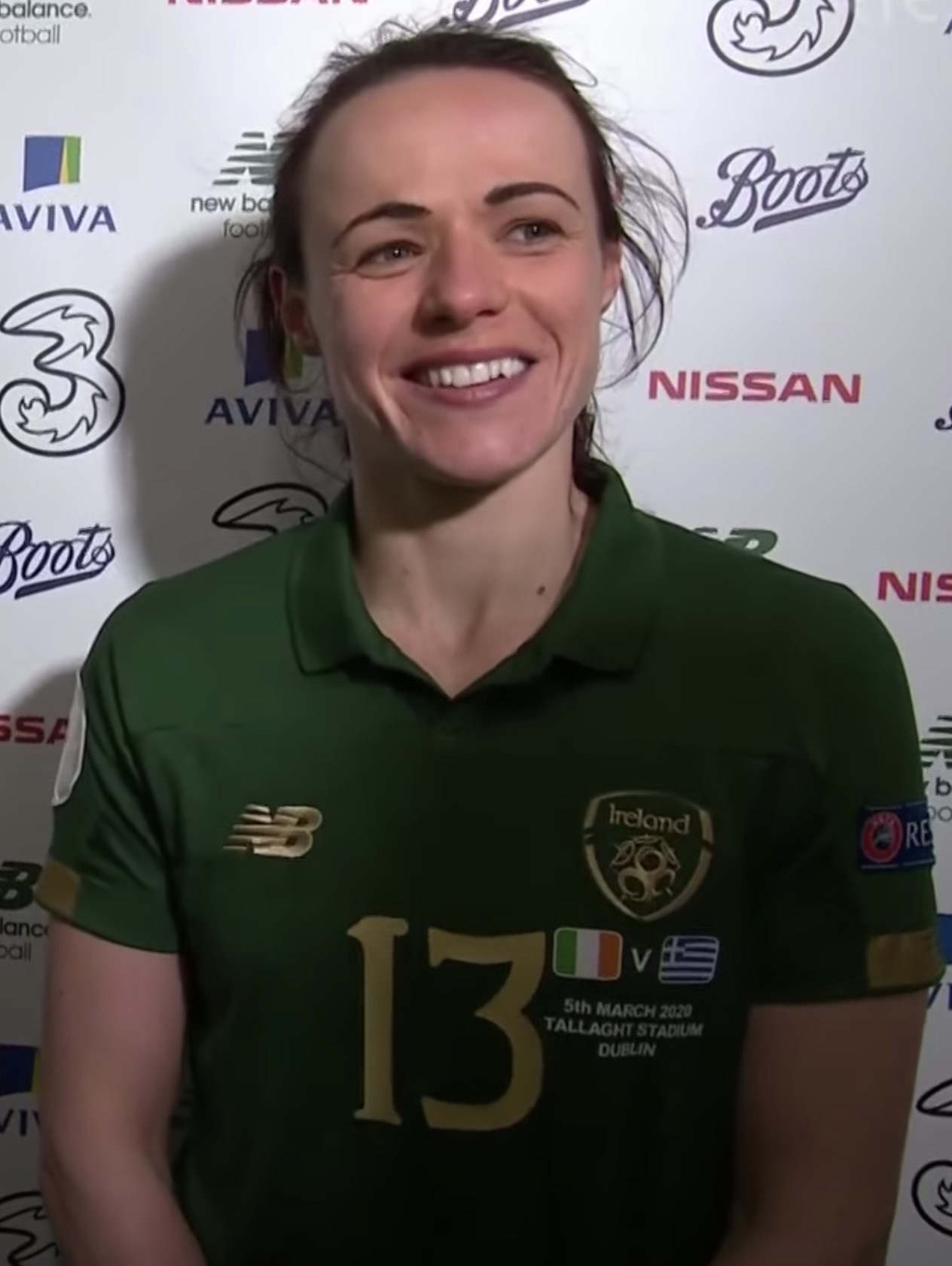
- O'Gorman in 2020

Personal information
- Full name: Áine Marie O'Gorman
- Date of birth: 13 May 1989 (age 37)
- Place of birth: Wicklow, Ireland
- Height: 5 ft 4 in (1.63 m)
- Positions: Winger; forward

Youth career
- Enniskerry FC

Senior career*
| Years | Team | Apps | (Gls) |
| 2005–2009 | Stella Maris | | |
| 2009–2010 | Peamount United | | |
| 2010–2012 | Doncaster Rovers Belles | 28 | (4) |
| 2011 | → Peamount United (loan) | | |
| 2012–2014 | Peamount United | | |
| 2014–2017 | UCD Waves | | |
| 2017–2022 | Peamount United | | |
| 2023–2025 | Shamrock Rovers | 62 | (30) |

International career^{‡}
| 2006–2023 | Republic of Ireland | 119 | (13) |
- * Club domestic league appearances and goals as of 11 January 2024 (UTC) ‡ National team caps and goals as of 26 July 2023 (UTC)

Áine Marie O'Gorman (born 13 May 1989) is a retired Irish professional footballer. At club level, O'Gorman began her senior career with Stella Maris, played for Peamount United, Shamrock Rovers and UCD Waves, and also spent two seasons with the English FA WSL club Doncaster Rovers Belles in 2011 and 2012.

O'Gorman made her first appearance for the Republic of Ireland national team in March 2006 and collected her 100th cap in June 2018. After an 18-month period of retirement from international football, she returned to the national team in March 2020. In October 2022 she was in the Ireland team which beat Scotland at Hampden Park in the 2023 FIFA Women's World Cup qualification – UEFA play-offs, to qualify for the FIFA Women's World Cup for the first time.

A prolific forward at club level, O'Gorman has won the Women's National League top goalscorer award five times – including on three consecutive occasions from 2020 to 2022 – in her long association with Peamount United. She was also Women's National League Player of the Year in 2014–15. With the national team she has often been deployed as an attacking full-back. She has worked for RTÉ as a football pundit on their television and radio coverage.

== Club career ==
=== Early career ===
O'Gorman played club football for Stella Maris, while attending sports scholarships at Sallynoggin College and IT Carlow. She was named in an Irish Colleges team which travelled to Scotland for two friendly matches in April 2009. She was also selected to represent Leinster, helping them to the 2009 interprovincial title. Having switched to Peamount United, O'Gorman struck a hat-trick in the 2010 FAI Women's Cup final, as Peamount beat Salthill Devon 4–2 at Tolka Park. In her first, single-season spell with Peamount United O'Gorman also won the Dublin Women's Soccer League (DWSL) and DWSL Premier Cup, as the club secured a "treble".

O'Gorman also played Gaelic football for Bray Emmets and in September 2010 helped the club win the Wicklow Ladies Senior Football Championship, scoring four goals and two points in the final.

=== Doncaster Rovers Belles ===
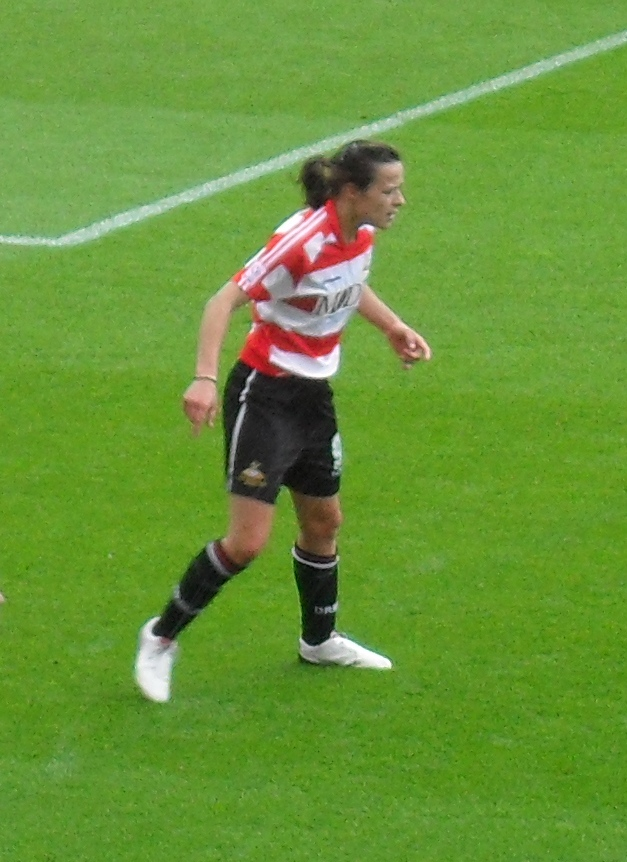
With Doncaster Rovers Belles in 2011

O'Gorman signed for FA WSL club Doncaster Rovers Belles in October 2010, after a successful trial. O'Gorman was given accommodation at the Ramada Jarvis hotel in Robin Hood Airport Doncaster Sheffield, with other signings Kylla Sjoman and Maria Karlsson. She made her debut in Doncaster's 1–0 FA Women's Cup win at Chelsea in March 2011.

Finding the standard of play in England higher than she had been used to, O'Gorman admitted to some disappointment with her first season total of four goals. Despite this, her hard working style had endeared her to the South Yorkshire club's supporters. At the end of the 2011 FA WSL season she returned to Peamount on loan ahead of the Irish club's 2011–12 UEFA Women's Champions League tie with Paris Saint-Germain.

Although she was increasingly tired of living in a hotel, O'Gorman returned to Doncaster Rovers Belles for the 2012 FA WSL season. She was happy to be joined by compatriot Julie-Ann Russell who also signed. In September 2012 she marked her final game for the club with a 35-yard lobbed goal in The Belles' 3–2 defeat at title-winning Arsenal.

=== Peamount United ===
O'Gorman scored in Peamount's 6–3 WNL Cup final win over Castlebar Celtic in May 2013, to help the club retain the trophy. In October 2013, O'Gorman provided an assist for Stephanie Roche to score a celebrated goal in Peamount's win over Wexford Youths. Roche's goal eventually finished second in the FIFA Puskás Award, after it went viral on YouTube. "It was a great cross, wasn't it? It was all in the cross," O'Gorman later joked. In 2013–14 O'Gorman was named in the WNL Team of the Season, as Peamount were edged out in a close title race by Raheny United.

=== UCD Waves ===
Popular manager Eileen Gleeson left Peamount for UCD Waves in 2014, and O'Gorman was one of several Peamount players to follow Gleeson to her new club. When UCD Waves lost the 2014 FAI Women's Cup final 2–1 to Raheny United in extra-time, O'Gorman celebrated her equalising goal by revealing a t-shirt with stricken team-mate Chloe Mustaki's squad number 17 on it. She secured the 2014–15 Golden Boot when rival striker Katie McCabe's club Raheny United received a walkover in their final fixture at Cork City, who failed to muster a team. O'Gorman had already been named the WNL Player of the Season.

In 2015–16, O'Gorman struck 17 goals to retain her Golden Boot title. She was also one of three nominees for Player of the Season, but lost out to UCD teammate Karen Duggan. UCD Waves were upset 1–0 by Cork City in the 2017 FAI Women's Cup final, but O'Gorman missed the occasion with a medial ligament injury.

=== Return to Peamount United ===
In December 2017, club captain O'Gorman left UCD to return to Peamount United. She declared: "I want to be successful and I want to win trophies. I want to be part of a good set-up and I think Peamount has the ingredients to be very successful." Peamount finished third in 2018, but collected their first trophy for five years when O'Gorman scored in a 2–1 WNL Cup final win over Wexford Youths.

In 2019 The Peas recaptured the League title for the first time since 2011–12. O'Gorman also played in Peamount's 2018 and 2019 FAI Women's Cup final defeats by Wexford Youths. In the delayed and shortened 2020 season O'Gorman showed good form, being named in the Team of the Season and winning the Golden Boot with 14 goals in 12 games as Peamount retained their WNL title. She also scored in the 2020 FAI Women's Cup Final as The Peas thrashed Cork City 6–0 at Tallaght Stadium.

Peamount were deposed as champions by Shelbourne on the final day of the 2021 season, but O'Gorman retained her Golden Boot award and place in the Team of the Season. In 2022 she was again in the Team of the Season and her 22 goals secured a third consecutive Golden Boot award, her fifth in total.

=== Shamrock Rovers ===
On 23 November 2022, O'Gorman departed Peamount. The following day, it was announced that O'Gorman would be joining Shamrock Rovers as their first new signing ahead of the 2023 season. She joined Shamrock Rovers on a semi-professional basis, having previously been an amateur in her club career in Ireland. She hoped that training more often would protect her national team place. O'Gorman had been a longstanding proponent of the Women's National League becoming semi-professional. She spent three seasons with the club before retiring from Football.

== International career ==
=== Youth ===
O'Gorman was capped by the Republic of Ireland at under-17 and under-19 level. At the FAI International Football Awards she was named 2006 Under-19 Women's International Player of the Year. She concluded her under-19 national team career in April 2008, with 14 goals in 30 appearances.

=== Senior ===
O'Gorman was called-up to the senior panel for the 2006 Algarve Cup and made her debut in Ireland's final match at the tournament: a 4–0 defeat by Denmark in Lagoa. She became established in the senior team as a 16-year-old and featured in Ireland's subsequent qualifying campaigns. In Ireland's final 2011 FIFA Women's World Cup qualification fixture against Israel at the Carlisle Grounds in Bray, she was shown a red card for two bookable offences. When signing for Doncaster aged 21 in October 2010, O'Gorman had accrued 38 senior caps.

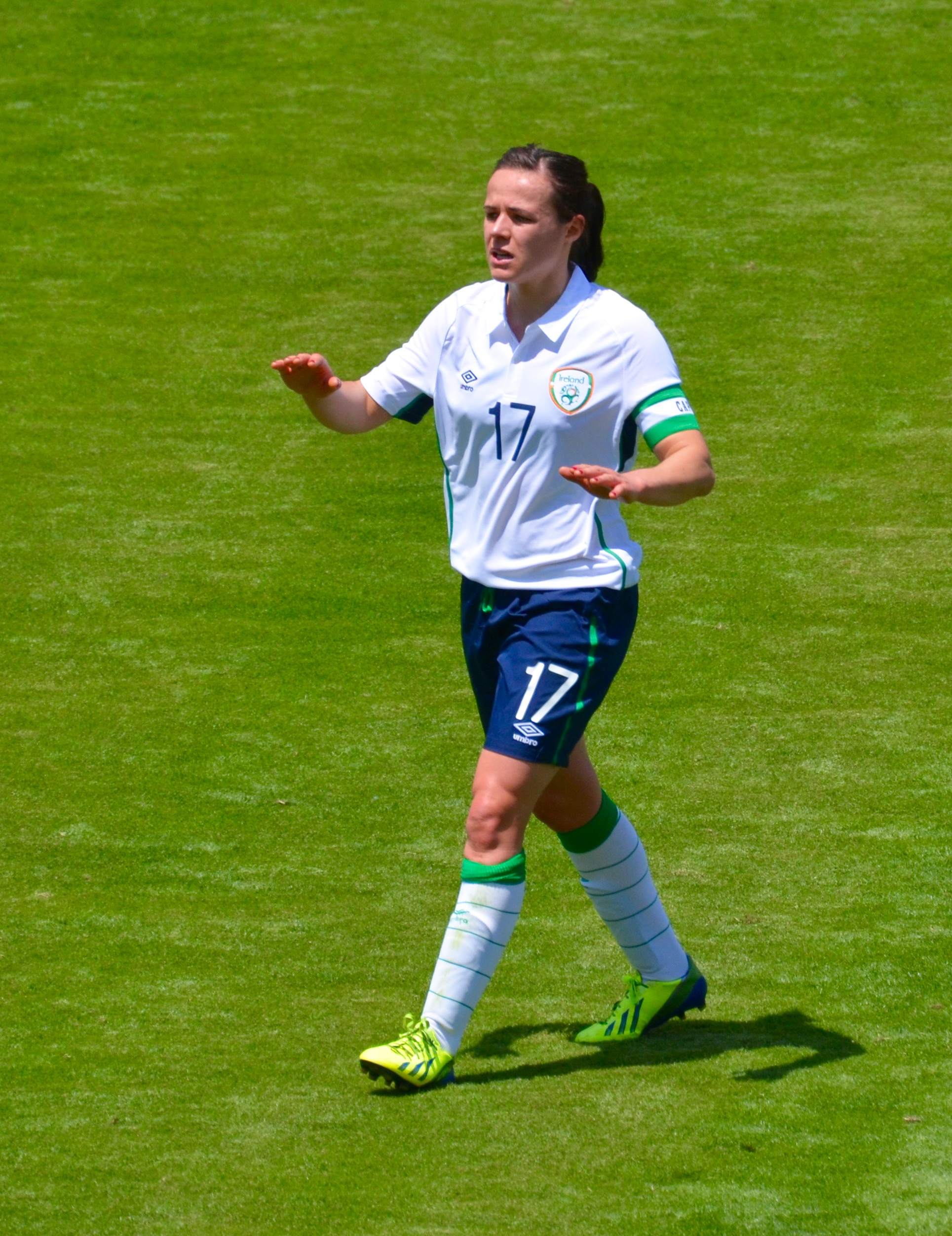
O'Gorman captaining Ireland in May 2015

In September 2012, O'Gorman reached a half century of appearances for Ireland, in a 2–0 EURO 2013 qualifying win over Israel at Ramat Gan Stadium. National team coach Susan Ronan experimented by deploying versatile O'Gorman as a right-back during the team's unsuccessful 2015 FIFA Women's World Cup qualification campaign. She continued to play further forward at club level: "I am happy to play right-back if I’m asked by Sue Ronan with the national team but I see myself as a striker".

In May 2015, O'Gorman captained Ireland for the first time, in a daunting friendly away to world champions the United States. After the match had been arranged, it was discovered to be outside FIFA's designated dates for international matches, so regular captain Emma Byrne was not released by her English club Arsenal. Ireland took credit from their 3–0 defeat, with O'Gorman an "able marshall" in defence. In June 2016 O'Gorman scored a hat-trick in Ireland's 9–0 win over Montenegro.

In April 2017, O'Gorman was among a delegation of 13 players who secured substantially improved working conditions for Ireland's female national team players, following a protracted dispute with the Football Association of Ireland. O'Gorman collected her 100th cap in a 1–0 defeat by Norway in Stavanger, which eliminated Ireland from 2019 FIFA Women's World Cup qualification. The match seemed to be O'Gorman's last in Ireland's colours, as she announced her retirement from international football in September 2018.

Incoming coach Vera Pauw persuaded O'Gorman to reverse her decision in February 2020, as she required cover for injured full-backs Megan Campbell and Keeva Keenan. On 5 March 2020, O'Gorman returned to international football, playing in a 1–0 win against Greece. O'Gorman remained in the team for Ireland's penultimate UEFA Women's Euro 2022 qualifier against Ukraine in Kyiv on 23 October 2020. She was disappointed when her own goal contributed to a costly 1–0 defeat.

In October 2022 O'Gorman was the only home-based player in the Ireland team which beat Scotland 1–0 at Hampden Park in the 2023 FIFA Women's World Cup qualification – UEFA play-offs, to qualify for the FIFA Women's World Cup for the first time. Her selection on the right wing had been considered somewhat surprising, representing the first national team match she had started since November 2021. She was among the players to apologise for the team singing Celtic Symphony during post-match celebrations in the dressing room.

With her appearance against Canada at the 2023 FIFA Women's World Cup O'Gorman became the first active League of Ireland player to wear the green shirt at a World Cup. On 24 August 2023, Áine retired from international football after 17 years

== Personal life ==
O'Gorman attended Loreto Secondary School in Bray. In November 2015, O'Gorman was employed as a personal trainer and was engaging in charity fundraising. In 2021 she married Rachel Neary, and their son James was born in July 2022. O'Gorman has worked for RTÉ as a football pundit on their television and radio coverage. In 2022 she used her position to speak publicly about Human rights issues involving the 2022 FIFA World Cup and LGBT issues at the 2022 FIFA World Cup.

== Career statistics ==
Appearances and goals by national team and year
| National team | Year | Apps | Goals |
|---|---|---|---|
| Republic of Ireland | 2006 | 7 | 0 |
| Republic of Ireland | 2007 | 6 | 0 |
| Republic of Ireland | 2008 | 13 | 2 |
| Republic of Ireland | 2009 | 5 | 0 |
| Republic of Ireland | 2010 | 6 | 0 |
| Republic of Ireland | 2011 | 3 | 1 |
| Republic of Ireland | 2012 | 12 | 1 |
| Republic of Ireland | 2013 | 7 | 2 |
| Republic of Ireland | 2014 | 11 | 1 |
| Republic of Ireland | 2015 | 10 | 1 |
| Republic of Ireland | 2016 | 10 | 4 |
| Republic of Ireland | 2017 | 8 | 1 |
| Republic of Ireland | 2018 | 2 | 0 |
| Republic of Ireland | 2020 | 5 | 0 |
| Republic of Ireland | 2021 | 6 | 0 |
| Republic of Ireland | 2022 | 3 | 0 |
| Republic of Ireland | 2023 | 3 | 0 |
| Total | | 117 | 13 |

Scores and results list Republic of Ireland's goals first. Score column indicates score after each O'Gorman goal. Updated as of 16 May 2023.

International goals scored by Aine O'Gorman
| No. | Cap | Date | Venue | Opponent | Score | Result | Competition | Ref. |
|---|---|---|---|---|---|---|---|---|
| 1 | 14 | 2 February 2008 | John Hyland Park, Baldonnel, County Dublin | Poland | 3-0 | 4-1 | Friendly | |
| 2 | 18 | 12 March 2008 | Arsenio Catuna Complex, Guia | Poland | 2-0 | 2-2 | 2008 Algarve Cup | |
| 3 | 39 | 22 September 2011 | Turners Cross, Cork | France | 1-3 | 1-3 | 2013 UEFA Women's Championship Qual. | |
| 4 | 44 | 7 March 2012 | Estádio Municipal de Quarteira, Quarteira | Hungary | 1-0 | 2-1 | 2012 Algarve Cup | |
| 5 | 54 | 8 March 2013 | Tasos Markou, Paralimni | South Africa | 1-0 | 1-0 | 2013 Cyprus Cup | |
| 6 | 59 | 30 October 2013 | Ob Jezeru City Stadium, Velenje | Slovenia | 2-0 | 3-0 | 2015 FIFA Women's World Cup Qual. | |
| 7 | 60 | 5 March 2014 | Tasos Markou, Paralimni | New Zealand | 1-0 | 1-1 | 2014 Cyprus Cup | |
| 8 | 79 | 27 October 2015 | Parque de Jogos Comendador Joaquim de Almeida Freitas, Moreira de Cónegos | Portugal | 2-1 | 2-1 | 2017 UEFA Women's Championship Qual. | |
| 9 | 86 | 7 April 2016 | Stadion pod Malim brdom, Petrovac | Montenegro | 2-0 | 5-0 | UEFA Women's Euro 2017 qualifying | |
| 10 | 89 | 7 June 2016 | Tallaght Stadium, Dublin | Montenegro | 2-0 | 9-0 | UEFA Women's Euro 2017 qualifying | |
| 11 | 89 | 7 June 2016 | Tallaght Stadium, Dublin | Montenegro | 4-0 | 9-0 | UEFA Women's Euro 2017 qualifying | |
| 12 | 89 | 7 June 2016 | Tallaght Stadium, Dublin | Montenegro | 5-0 | 9-0 | UEFA Women's Euro 2017 qualifying | |
| 13 | 91 | 1 March 2017 | Paralimni Stadium, Paralimni | Czech Republic | 2-0 | 2-0 | 2017 Cyprus Women's Cup | |

== Honours ==
Peamount United

- Women's National League: 2019, 2020
- FAI Women's Cup: 2010, 2020
- Women's National League Cup: 2013, 2018
- Dublin Women's Soccer League: 2010
- DWSL Premier Cup: 2010

Individual

- FAI Women's National League Top Goalscorer: 2014–15, 2015–16, 2020, 2021, 2022
- FAI Women's National League Player of the Season: 2014–15
- FAI Under-19 Women's International Player of the Year: 2006
