= Sara Lawlor =

Irish footballer (born 1987)

Personal information
- Full name: Sara Lawlor
- Date of birth: 11 November 1987 (age 38)
- Place of birth: Dublin, Ireland
- Position: Forward

College career
Years	Team	Apps	(Gls)
2007	Quinnipiac Bobcats		

Senior career*
Years	Team	Apps	(Gls)
2000–2013	Peamount United		

International career^{‡}
2012–2013	Republic of Ireland	7	(0)
- * Club domestic league appearances and goals as of 16:15, 9 January 2016 (UTC) ‡ National team caps and goals as of 16:15, 9 January 2016 (UTC)

Sara Lawlor (born 11 November 1987) is an Irish international footballer who played for Peamount United of the Women's National League (WNL). She made her debut for the Republic of Ireland women's national football team in February 2012. A forward, Lawlor was the WNL Player of the Season in both 2011–12 and 2012–13.

== Club career ==
Lawlor played her first match for Peamount United in January 2000 and featured in the club's FAI Women's Cup final defeat by Dundalk in 2005. She remained with the club for the inaugural 2011–12 Women's National League season, helping Peamount United win the title. She contributed 15 goals to Peamount's success, formed a "devastating" striking partnership with Stephanie Roche and was named Player of the Year at the inaugural end of season awards ceremony.

In 2012–13 Peamount lost their league title to Raheny United but the campaign was a personal triumph for Lawlor. The top goalscorer with 28 goals, she won a second consecutive Player of the Year award.

== International career ==
At the girls' football tournament at the 2003 European Youth Olympic Festival, Lawlor scored in the third place play-off shootout as Ireland beat France on penalties after a 1–1 draw at Stade Sébastien Charléty in Paris. Lawlor was one of three nominees for the 2005 Under-19 Women's International Player of the Year, won by Niamh Fahey.

After noting her impressive form in the nascent Women's National League, national team coach Susan Ronan called Lawlor up to the senior Republic of Ireland squad for the first time ahead of the 2012 Algarve Cup. Lawlor made her debut in Ireland's opening match at the tournament, a 1–0 defeat by Hungary. She also represented Ireland at the 2013 Summer Universiade in July. In October 2013, Lawlor withdrew from the national squad with a knee injury.
