= Dearbháile Beirne =

Irish footballer

Personal information
- Date of birth: 5 August 1998 (age 28)
- Place of birth: Mohill, Ireland
- Height: 1.67 m (5 ft 6 in)
- Position: Left-back

Team information
- Current team: Peamount United
- Number: 17

Youth career
- Peamount United
- 2014–2015: Shelbourne

Senior career*
Years	Team	Apps	(Gls)
2015–2016	Shelbourne		
2016–2018	UCD Waves		
2018–	Peamount United		

International career^{‡}
2018–	Republic of Ireland	1	(0)
- * Club domestic league appearances and goals as of 15:37, 13 December 2020 (UTC) ‡ National team caps and goals as of 15:37, 13 December 2020 (UTC)

Dearbháile Beirne (/ˈdɜːrvlə ˈbɜːrn/; born 5 August 1998) is an Irish dual code footballer from Mohill in County Leitrim. In soccer she plays for Peamount United of the Women's National League (WNL) and has represented the Republic of Ireland women's national football team at youth and senior level. She has also played Ladies' Gaelic football for Leitrim GAA, competing in the Ladies' National Football League and All-Ireland Intermediate Ladies' Football Championship.

== Club career ==
In summer 2015 Beirne was elevated from Shelbourne's youth team into the club's new Women's National League squad. In the 2015–16 season she featured as Shelbourne were edged out by Wexford Youths in both the WNL Shield final and a play-off for the League title. For the transitional 2016 season Beirne moved to UCD Waves. She played in the 2017 FAI Women's Cup final for UCD Waves at the Aviva Stadium, but they were upset 1–0 by Cork City.

During the 2018 season Beirne returned to Peamount United. She was Cup-tied for their 2018 WNL Cup final win over Wexford Youths. In 2019 "The Peas" recaptured the League title for the first time since 2011–12. Beirne also played in Peamount's 2018 and 2019 FAI Women's Cup final defeats by Wexford Youths.

== International career ==
=== Youth ===
Beirne represented Ireland at schoolgirl level in 2012–13 while she attended Mohill Community College. In May 2014 she was named in the national under-16 squad for a UEFA development tournament in Switzerland.

She represented the Republic of Ireland women's national under-17 football team in the 2015 UEFA Women's Under-17 Championship qualification elite round mini tournament at Turners Cross, featuring in a 2–0 win over England. At the final tournament in Iceland, Beirne was included in the Ireland squad who were eliminated after losing all three group matches.

While enrolled at University College Dublin, Beirne was selected to represent Ireland at the 2017 Summer Universiade.

=== Senior ===
Coach Colin Bell called up Beirne to the senior national team for the first time in summer 2017, for two friendlies against Iceland and Scotland ahead of the 2019 FIFA Women's World Cup qualifying series.

On 9 October 2018 Beirne won her first senior cap in a 4–0 friendly defeat in Poland. She entered play as a 90th-minute substitute for Claire O'Riordan.

== Gaelic football ==
During her soccer career Beirne continued to play Ladies' Gaelic football for the Mohill GAA club and her county, Leitrim GAA.

== Personal life ==
Beirne has appeared in the Raidió Teilifís Éireann (RTÉ) television series Ireland's Fittest Family with her father Michael and older brothers Jonathan and Keith. In Series three (2015) they were eliminated in the heats, but they returned in series five (2017) to win the competition and secure the €15,000 prize.
