= Eileen Gleeson =

Irish football coach

Personal information
- Place of birth: Dublin, Ireland

Senior career*
Years	Team	Apps	(Gls)
- Blacklions
- Ballymun United
- Hamman Celtic

Managerial career
- 2000–2004: Ballymun United
- 2004–2006: St James's Gate
- 2006–2014: Peamount United
- 2014–2017: UCD Waves
- 2019–2021: Republic of Ireland (assistant)
- 2021–2022: Glasgow City
- 2022–2023: FAI Head of Women and Girls Football
- 2023–2024: Republic of Ireland
- * Club domestic league appearances and goals

Eileen Gleeson is an Irish association football manager who was most recently head coach of the Republic of Ireland women's team. She has also held the role of the Football Association of Ireland's (FAI) Head of Women and Girls Football, as well as being Assistant Coach to Vera Pauw with the Ireland women’s team. At club level, Gleeson has coached Glasgow City of the Scottish Women's Premier League and Women's National League (Ireland) sides UCD Waves and Peamount United, who she guided to the last 32 of the 2011–12 UEFA Women's Champions League.

== Playing career ==
As a player, Gleeson played in the Civil Service League with Blacklions and in the Dublin Women's Soccer League with Ballymun United and Hamman Celtic. She characterised herself as a hard-working but limited player: "I wouldn't be highlighting anything about my playing days."

== Coaching career ==
=== Early coaching career ===
Gleeson began her coaching career with Ballymun United in the Dublin Women's Soccer League and also had a spell with St James's Gate.

=== Peamount United ===
Gleeson served as manager of Peamount United between 2006 and 2014. Under Gleeson, United became one of the most successful women's football teams in the Republic of Ireland. She guided Peamount United to a treble in 2010, winning the Dublin Women's Soccer League title, the DWSL Premier Cup and the FAI Women's Cup. Under Gleeson, Peamount also won the inaugural 2011–12 Women's National League title and the WNL Cup in both 2012 and 2013. Gleeson also managed Peamount during their 2011–12 and 2012–13 UEFA Women's Champions League campaigns.

In the 2013–14 season, when Stephanie Roche scored her FIFA Puskás Award-nominated goal for Peamount against Wexford Youths, it was Gleeson who uploaded footage of the goal on the internet. It later went viral on YouTube.

=== UCD Waves ===
The 2014–15 Women's National League season saw Gleeson become manager of UCD Waves. A number of Peamount United players including Julie-Ann Russell, Aine O'Gorman, Karen Duggan, Dora Gorman, Chloe Mustaki and Emily Cahill all subsequently followed Gleeson to UCD Waves. She quit UCD in January 2017, to focus on a PhD. She had obtained a UEFA Pro Licence in 2015.

=== Ireland (assistant coach) ===
In September 2019, Vera Pauw, the incoming manager of the Republic of Ireland women's national football team, appointed Gleeson as her assistant. The two built a strong working relationship during Ireland's unsuccessful UEFA Women's Euro 2022 qualifying Group I campaign, and Pauw was disappointed when Gleeson accepted a head coach role with Glasgow City in October 2021.

Gleeson signed off with a 2-1 away win over Finland. The team subsequently went on to qualify for their first world cup finals appearance with a playoff win over Scotland in October 2022.

=== Glasgow City ===
Glasgow City announced that Gleeson would take over as their new head coach in November 2021, part way through the 2021–22 Scottish Women's Premier League season. The team had dropped points against their rivals Celtic and Rangers and sat 3rd in the table under interim coach Grant Scott. City, who had won the previous 14 titles were eventually beaten to the championship by Rangers – The team rallied under Gleeson to score 55 goals in 18 games securing Champions League Qualification ahead of Celtic. They lost out to Celtic in both the Cup Finals.

The draw for the 2022/23 Champions league pitted Glasgow in a qualifying group with Paris FC, Roma and Servette, who had beaten City the previous campaign. A 3-1 loss to Roma and a 1 - 0 defeat to Servette ended the campaign early.

In the 2022–23 Scottish Women's Premier League season, Glasgow City got off to a flying start with 11 wins and 1 draw in their first 12 games. They sat on top of the table at the end of 2022. It came as a surprise when it was announced that Gleeson was stepping down to return to Ireland. "I would like to sincerely express my gratitude to all at the club for providing the opportunity to be involved with such an iconic women's football club such as Glasgow City," she said. Glasgow City ultimately regained the championship under Leanne Ross, who was promoted from Assistant to Head Coach after Gleeson's departure.

In total Gleeson oversaw 30 SWPL games, winning 26 and losing just once.

=== Ireland (head coach) ===
In August 2023, Gleeson was appointed interim coach following the departure of Pauw, and in December 2023 her appointment was made permanent.

Gleeson's first four months in the role saw a perfect record in the first edition of the UEFA Women's Nations League, as the Republic of Ireland won all six of their group games, securing promotion to UEFA Women's Euro 2025 qualifying League A. League A proved more challenging as the side suffered defeats home and away to England and Sweden and were relegated back to Nations League B, albeit recording a 3-1 home win against France and securing seeding for the UEFA Women's Euro 2025 qualifying play-offs. Ireland were drawn against Georgia in the first round of the playoffs, winning 9-0 on aggregate across two legs. In the second round of qualification, they faced Wales, against whom they lost 3-2 on aggregate, missing out on qualification to Euro 2025.

In December 2024, Gleeson's tenure as head coach came to an end as the FAI chose not to offer her a new contract.

== FAI Head of Women and Girls Football ==
As Head of Women and Girls Football in the FAI, Gleeson was responsible for helping to grow participation and retention of women and girls at all levels of the game, while also supporting wider football development strategies, ensuring a pathway for every woman and girl in Ireland to achieve their full potential.

== Managerial career statistics ==
League Championship Results
Season	Competition	Club	PLD	W	D	L	F	A	Win %	League Position	FAI/SFA Cup	League Cup
2010	DWSL	Peamount United	-	-	-	-	-	-	-	Champions	Winners	Winners
2011/12	WNL	Peamount United	15	12	0	3	66	15	80%	Champions		Winners
2012/13	WNL	Peamount United	18	14	2	2	80	20	78%	2nd	SF	Winners
2013/14	WNL	Peamount United	21	17	3	1	75	19	81%	2nd	Runner Up	SF
2014/15	WNL	UCD Waves	18	13	2	3	69	14	72%	2nd	SF	Runner Up
2015/16	WNL	UCD Waves	12	8	1	3	38	14	67%	3rd	SF	Runner Up
2016/17	WNL	UCD Waves	12	7	3	2	33	11	58%	4th	Runner Up	SF
2021/22	SWPL	Glasgow City	18*	15	2	1	55	8	83%	2nd	Runner Up	Runner Up
2022/23	SWPL	Glasgow City	12**	11	1	0	43	5	92%	Champions	N/A	SF
2023/24	UWNL	Republic of Ireland	6	6	0	0	20	2	100%	1st place group B1		
2024	European Qualifiers	Republic of Ireland	6	1	0	5	4	10	NA	Group A3		

* Gleeson joined the Glasgow City team part way through the 2021/22 season. She took charge of 18 of the 27 League games and finished runner up.
** Gleeson took charge for 12 games of the 2022/23 season gaining 34 of 36 points available. The team finished the season as champions with 83 points from 32 matches.

UEFA Champions League
Season	Competition	Club	PLD	W	D	L	F	A	Final position
2011/12	UWCL	Peamount United	5	2	0	3	12	7	Round of 32
2012/13	UWCL	Peamount United	3	2	0	1	9	4	Qualifying Round
2022/23	UWCL	Glasgow City	2	0	0	2	1	4	Qualifying Round

== Honours ==
- Women's National League
  - Winners: 2010, 2012
  - Runners-up: 2013, 2014, 2015, 2017
- FAI Women's Cup
  - Winners: 2010
  - Runners-up: 2008, 2012, 2014, 2017
- WNL Cup
  - Winners: 2012, 2013
  - Runners-up: 2015, 2016
- Scottish Women's Premier League
  - Winner: 2022-2023
  - Runners-up: 2021/22
- Scottish Women's Cup
  - Runners-up: 2022
- Scottish Women's Premier League Cup
  - Runners-up: 2021
- UEFA Women's Nations League
  - Groub B winners, promotion to League A: 2023
