= Karen Duggan =

Irish footballer (born 1991)

Personal information
- Full name: Karen Duggan
- Date of birth: 29 May 1991 (age 35)
- Place of birth: Piltown, County Kilkenny, Ireland
- Position: Midfielder

Youth career
- Piltown L.F.C.
- 2010: Tramore (Waterford)

College career
| Years | Team | Apps | (Gls) |
| 2009–2013 | University of Limerick | | |

Senior career*
| Years | Team | Apps | (Gls) |
| 2011–2014 | Peamount United | | |
| 2014–2017 | UCD Waves | | |
| 2018–2025 | Peamount United | | |

International career^{‡}
| 2013–2018 | Republic of Ireland | 35 | (0) |
- * Club domestic league appearances and goals ‡ National team caps and goals as of 02:15, 13 December 2020 (UTC)

Karen Duggan (born 29 May 1991) is an Irish former footballer who played for Peamount United of the Women's National League (WNL). She has previously played for UCD Waves and the Republic of Ireland women's national football team. Between 2013 and 2016 Duggan was selected for the WNL Team of the Season for four successive seasons. She was the only player selected all four seasons. In 2015–16 she was also WNL Senior Player of the Season. Duggan has also played camogie at club, university and county level.

== Early years ==
Duggan was born in Piltown, County Kilkenny. She is the daughter of Pat and Bernie Duggan and has an older brother, John. Between 2005 and 2009 Duggan attended Scoil Mhuire (Greenhills) in Carrick-on-Suir where she studied for her Leaving Cert. While there she played various sports including association football, camogie, Gaelic football and basketball. As a schoolgirl she also played association football for Piltown L.F.C. and began playing camogie with Piltown GAA. Duggan also played for Kilkenny GAA in the 2009 All-Ireland Minor Camogie Championship final.

== Club career ==
=== University of Limerick ===
Between 2009 and 2013, Duggan attended the University of Limerick where she gained a 2.1 Honours Science Education Degree. She also qualified to become a science teacher. Together with Julie-Ann Russell, Duggan also played for the UL association football team that won the 2010 WSCAI Intervarsities Cup. They defeated a UCD team that featured Louise Quinn 2–1 in the final at Turners Cross. Duggan and Russell also helped the team win the WSCAI Premier Division in 2010–11. They also played for the UL ladies futsal team that won the 2011 WSCAI National Futsal Intervarsities title.

Duggan also represented UL at camogie, helping them win the 2010 Ashbourne Shield and then finish as runners up in the 2013 Ashbourne Cup. While a student at UL Duggan also played association football for Tramore in the Waterford Ladies League. In September 2010 Duggan scored twice for Tramore in a 3–0 win over Johnville in the Waterford Ladies Cup final. Tramore completed a double, having already won the league title.

=== Peamount United ===
Duggan, along with fellow UL student Julie-Ann Russell, began playing for Peamount United in 2011 and subsequently played for the club in their 2011–12 UEFA Women's Champions League campaign and during the inaugural 2011–12 Women's National League season. In her first season with the club, Duggan helped Peamount win both the league title and the WNL Cup. Duggan was also selected for the WNL Team of the Season in both 2012–13 and 2013–14. Between 2013 and 2014, while playing with Peamount United, Duggan was also employed as a science teacher at Scoil Chríost Rí in Portlaoise. She also helped coach the school's association football team.

=== UCD Waves ===
The 2014–15 Women's National League season saw former Peamount United manager, Eileen Gleeson take charge of UCD Waves. Duggan was one of a number of Peamount United players, including Julie-Ann Russell, Aine O'Gorman, Dora Gorman, Chloe Mustaki and Emily Cahill who all subsequently followed Gleeson to UCD Waves. While playing for UCD Waves, Duggan was selected for the WNL Team of the Season for a third and fourth time in 2014–15 and 2015–16. In 2015–16 she was also named WNL Senior Player of the Season. In November 2014 Duggan started working as a business analyst and management consultant for Accenture. In 2017 she was named in the WNL Team of the Season again. She played in the 2017 FAI Women's Cup final for UCD Waves at the Aviva Stadium, but they were upset 1–0 by Cork City.

=== Peamount United ===
Ahead of the 2018 Women's National League season, Duggan returned to Peamount United. In 2019 The Peas recaptured the League title for the first time since 2011–12. Duggan also played in Peamount's 2018 and 2019 FAI Women's Cup final defeats by Wexford Youths. In 2020 Duggan displayed good form, being named November Player of the Month as Peamount retained their WNL title. She also scored in the 2020 FAI Women's Cup Final as The Peas vanquished Cork City 6–0 at Tallaght Stadium. At the WNL Awards in December 2020, Duggan was named in the Team of the Season for a record sixth time and named Player of the Year for the second time.

== International career ==
Duggan has represented the Republic of Ireland at under 15, under 17, under 19, university and senior level. In December 2011, Duggan was included in a Football Association of Ireland (FAI) scholarship programme for potential senior women's internationals.

Duggan made her senior debut at the 2013 Cyprus Cup, in a 1–0 win over South Africa. She also represented the Republic of Ireland in their 2015 FIFA Women's World Cup and UEFA Women's Euro 2017 qualifying campaigns. Duggan also represented Ireland at the 2013 Summer Universiade. At the FAI International Football Awards she was named 2016 Senior Women's International Player of the Year.

In September 2018 Duggan retired from international football after winning 35 caps, following Ireland's failed 2019 FIFA Women's World Cup qualifying campaign. She later declined an approach from her former Peamount and UCD coach Eileen Gleeson, who was named the incoming national team coach Vera Pauw's assistant, to resurrect her international career in the UEFA Women's Euro 2022 qualifiers.

== Media career ==
Duggan was part of RTÉ Sport's punditry team for the UEFA Euro 2020, alongside Damien Duff, Liam Brady, Richie Sadlier and Kevin Doyle.

== Honours ==
=== Association football ===
Individual

- FAI International Football Awards Senior International Women's Player of the Year
  - 2016
- FAI International Football Awards Under-19 Women's International Player of the Year
  - 2008
- Women's National League Senior Player of the Season
  - 2015–16, 2020
- Women's National League Team of the Season
  - 2012–13, 2013–14, 2014–15, 2015–16, 2017, 2020

Peamount United

- Women's National League
  - Winners: 2011–12, 2019, 2020, 2023: 4
  - Runners-up: 2012–13, 2013–14: 2
- WNL Cup
  - Winners: 2012, 2013: 2
- FAI Women's Cup
  - Winners: 2020: 1
  - Runners-up: 2012, 2018, 2019: 3

UCD Waves

- Women's National League
  - Runners-up: 2014–15
- FAI Women's Cup
  - Runners-up: 2014, 2017: 2
- WNL Cup
  - Runners-up: 2016: 1

University of Limerick

- WSCAI Premier Division
  - Winners: 2010–11
- WSCAI Intervarsities Cup
  - Winners: 2010
- WSCAI National Futsal Intervarsities
  - Winners: 2011

=== Camogie ===
Kilkenny GAA

- All-Ireland Minor Camogie Championship
  - Winners: 2009

Piltown GAA

- Kilkenny Senior Camogie Championship
  - Winners: 2024
- All-Ireland Intermediate Club Camogie Championship
  - Winners: 2014–15
- Leinster Intermediate Club Camogie Championship
  - Winners: 2014
- Kilkenny Intermediate Camogie Championship
  - Winners: 2014
- Kilkenny Junior Camogie Championship
  - Winners: 2008

University of Limerick

- Ashbourne Shield
  - Winners: 2010
- Ashbourne Cup
  - Runners-up: 2013
