= Ciara Grant (footballer, born 1993) =

Irish footballer (born 1993)

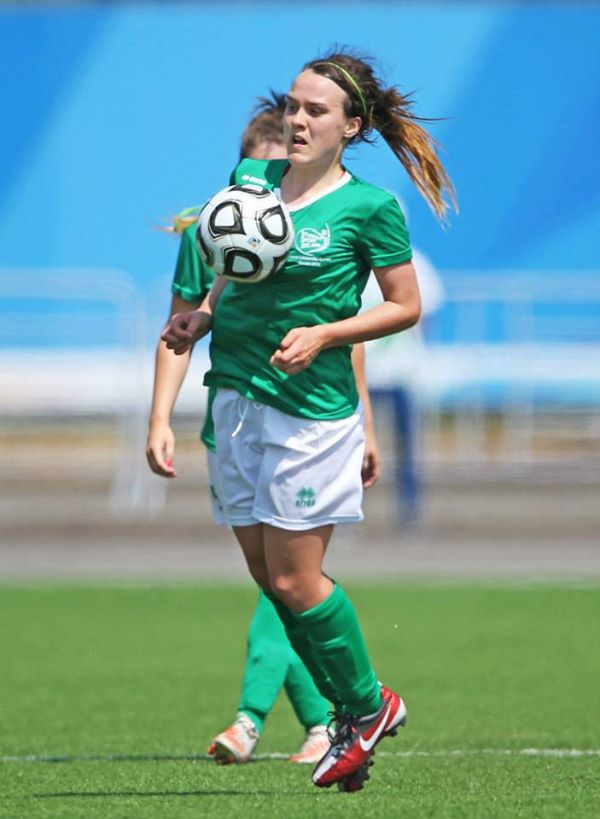
- Grant representing Ireland at the 2013 Summer Universiade

Personal information
- Full name: Ciara Grant
- Date of birth: 11 June 1993 (age 33)
- Place of birth: Letterkenny, County Donegal, Ireland
- Height: 1.65 m (5 ft 5 in)
- Position: Midfielder

Team information
- Current team: Hibernian
- Number: 6

Youth career
- Lagan Harps
- 2005–2011: Loreto School
- Kilmacrennan Celtic

College career
Years	Team	Apps	(Gls)
2011–2016	UCD		

Senior career*
Years	Team	Apps	(Gls)
2011–2014	Raheny United		
2014–2016	UCD Waves		
2019	Sion Swifts		
2020–2022	Shelbourne		
2022	Rangers		
2022–2024	Heart of Midlothian	57	(6)
2024–2026	Hibernian	52	(3)

International career^{‡}
2012–2021	Republic of Ireland	18	(0)
- * Club domestic league appearances and goals as of 4 May 2026 ‡ National team caps and goals as of 4 May 2026

Ciara Grant (born 11 June 1993) is an Irish professional footballer who plays as a midfielder for Hibernian of the Scottish Women's Premier League and for the Republic of Ireland national team. Grant has previously played for Raheny United, UCD Waves and Shelbourne of the Women's National League, and for Women's Premiership club Sion Swifts. Immediately prior to joining Hearts, Grant played for Rangers.

In 2010, Grant was a member of the Republic of Ireland under-17 squad who were runners-up in the 2010 UEFA Women's Under-17 Championship and quarter-finalists in the 2010 FIFA U-17 Women's World Cup. She won her first senior cap in November 2012. Outside of football Grant is a qualified medical doctor and worked as a lecturer for the Royal College of Surgeons in Ireland. She has also played Gaelic football for the Donegal county team.

== Early years ==
Grant attended Woodlands National School in Letterkenny where her classmates included Mark English. Between 2005 and 2011 Grant attended the Loreto Convent Secondary School, Letterkenny, where she studied for her Leaving Cert. As a schoolgirl, Grant played association football for Lagan Harps and Kilmacrennan Celtic as well as representing her school. In 2009, she helped Kilmacrennan Celtic win the WFAI Intermediate Cup and in 2011 she was a member of the Loreto team that won the FAIS Senior Girls Cup, the top cup competition for girls' school teams in Ireland. Grant also played Gaelic football and basketball. Grant played for Donegal GAA in the 2010 All-Ireland Under-18 Ladies' Football Championship final. In basketball she played as a point guard for both her school and Letterkenny Blaze.

== Club career ==
=== Raheny United ===
Between 2011 and 2014, Grant played for Raheny United in the Women's National League. During this time, Grant helped United win two successive league titles in 2012–13 and 2013–14. She also helped them win two successive FAI Women's Cups in 2012 and 2013. In the 2013 final against Castlebar Celtic at the Aviva Stadium, Grant scored United's opening goal in spectacular fashion. Without breaking stride, Grant controlled a dropping ball and let it bounce before lifting it over the Castlebar Celtic goalkeeper.

=== UCD Waves ===
Grant attended University College Dublin from 2011 until 2016. In her first year she studied physiotherapy before transferring to medicine. She graduated in 2017. In 2014–15 when UCD Waves entered a team in the Women's National League, Grant switched over from Raheny United. In November 2014, she appeared in her third consecutive FAI Women's Cup final, losing out 2–1 after extra-time to her former club. In addition to playing in the WNL, Grant also played for UCD at intervarsity level. In 2014 Grant was captain of the UCD team who won the WSCAI Futsal Cup, defeating the holders, I.T. Sligo, 3–2 in the final at the Mardyke Arena. Grant also scored for UCD in a 3–2 win over I.T. Sligo in the 2013–14 WSCAI Premier Division final. In 2015 Grant was captain of the UCD team that won the WSCAI Intervarsity Cup.

=== Sion Swifts ===
After a period away from football while she completed her medical studies, Grant joined Sion Swifts in their 2019 Women's Premiership campaign.

=== Shelbourne ===
Grant joined Shelbourne for the delayed and truncated 2020 Women's National League season. In 2021 Grant helped Shelbourne win the Women's National League title. She also scored in the 2021 FAI Women's Cup Final, which Shelbourne lost 3–1 to Wexford Youths.

=== Rangers ===
Grant joined Rangers on 28 January 2022. The six-month contract was Grant's first full-time professional deal, and made her the first Republic of Ireland international to sign for Rangers since Alex Stevenson in 1932. She helped Rangers finish the league season unbeaten and win their first ever Scottish Women's Premier League title.

=== Hearts ===
In June 2022 Grant agreed a transfer to Heart of Midlothian. She signed a one-year contract with an option for a further year, becoming only Hearts' second ever full-time professional female player after Emma Brownlie who signed the previous day. According to Grant, her relationship with head coach Eva Olid deteriorated badly towards the end of the 2023-24 season, leading to Grant's departure from the club shortly afterwards.

=== Hibernian ===
Grant left Hearts to join Edinburgh rivals Hibernian in June 2024, signing a one-year contract. On the 19th of May 2026, Grant announced her retirement from football.

== International career ==
=== Youth ===
Grant has represented the Republic of Ireland at under-15, under-17, under-19, university and senior level. In 2010 she was a member of the Republic of Ireland U-17 squad who were runners-up in the 2010 UEFA Women's Under-17 Championship and quarter-finalists in the 2010 FIFA U-17 Women's World Cup. In December 2011 Grant was included in a Football Association of Ireland (FAI) scholarship programme for potential senior women's international players. Grant also represented Ireland at the 2013 and 2015 Summer Universiades.

=== Senior ===
Grant made her senior international debut in November 2012, in a 5–0 friendly defeat by the United States in Portland, Oregon, replacing Niamh Fahey in the 57th minute. National team coach Sue Ronan deployed Grant in an unfamiliar right-back role. Grant subsequently represented Ireland at the 2013 and 2014 Cyprus Cups and in their unsuccessful 2015 FIFA Women's World Cup and UEFA Women's Euro 2017 qualifying campaigns.

After showing good form for Shelbourne, Grant was recalled to the national team by Vera Pauw in June 2021. On 30 November 2021 she made another appearance in a record 11–0 2023 FIFA Women's World Cup qualification – UEFA Group A win over Georgia.

=== International Appearances ===
Appearances and goals by national team and year
National team	Year	Apps
Republic of Ireland	2012	2
Republic of Ireland	2013	5
Republic of Ireland	2014	5
Republic of Ireland	2015	3
Republic of Ireland	2021	1
Total		16

== Personal life ==
Grant is a qualified medical doctor. She returned to her native Letterkenny to volunteer at a local hospital soon after the outbreak of the COVID-19 pandemic.

== Gallery ==
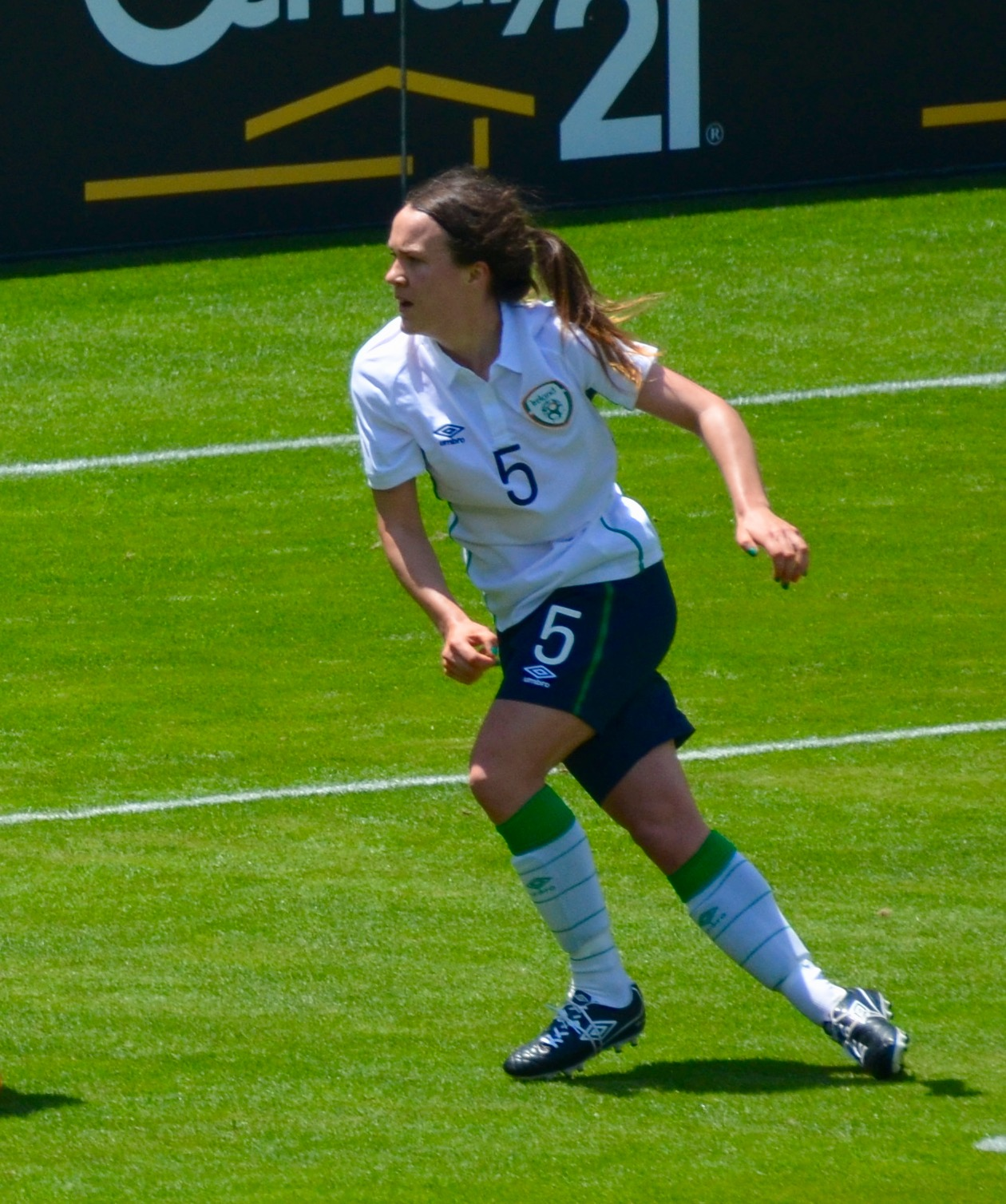

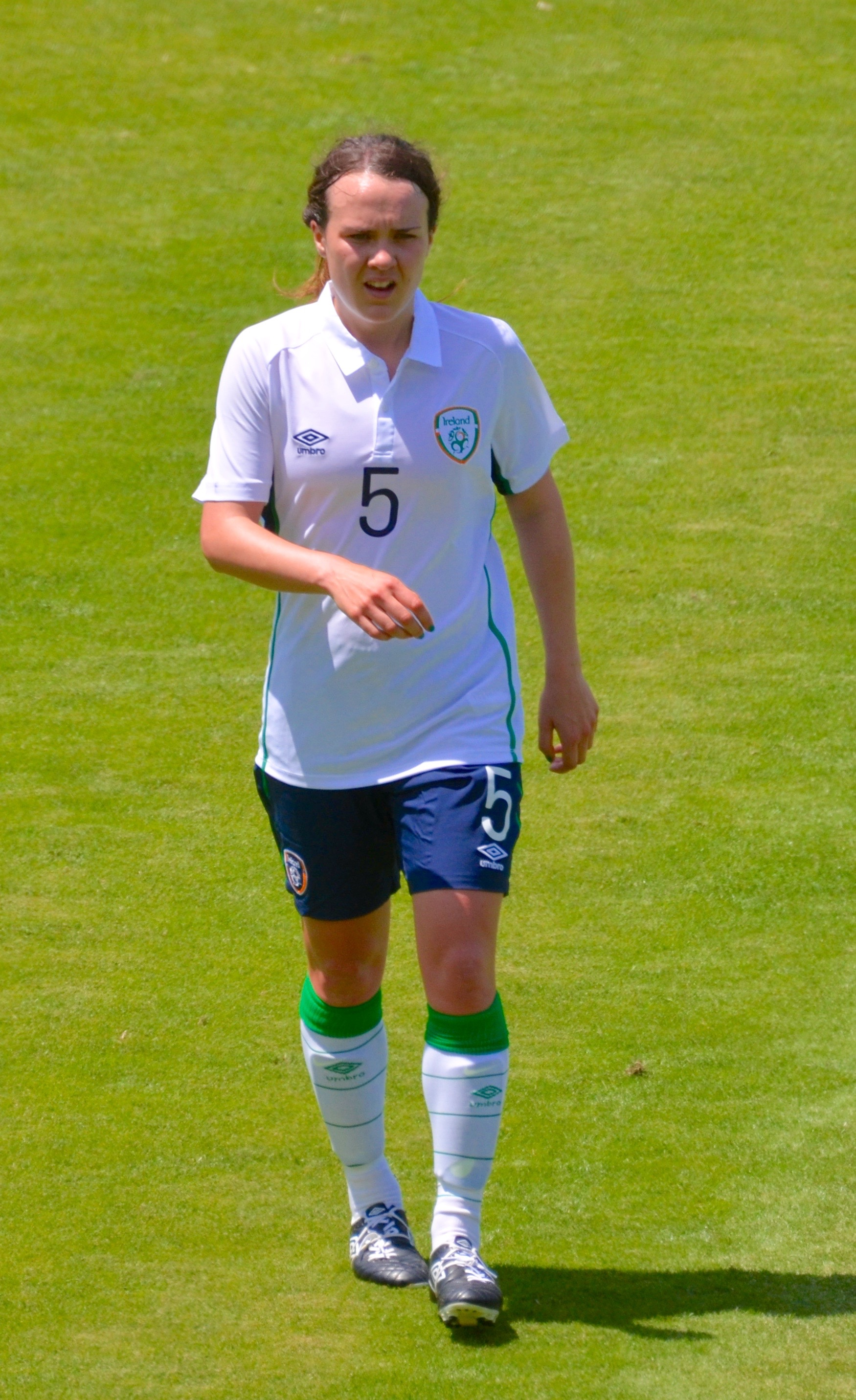

== Honours ==
=== Association football ===
Individual

- FAI International Football Awards Under-17 Women's International Player of the Year
  - 2008
- Women's National League Team of the Season
  - 2013–14

Raheny United

- Women's National League
  - Winners: 2012–13, 2013–14 : 2
  - Runners-up: 2011–12: 1
- FAI Women's Cup
  - Winners: 2012, 2013: 2

UCD Waves/UCD

- Women's National League
  - Runners-up: 2014–15
- FAI Women's Cup
  - Runners-up: 2014: 1
- WNL Cup
  - Runners-up: 2016: 1
- WSCAI Intervarsity Cup
  - Winners: 2015
- WSCAI Premier Division
  - Winners: 2013–14
- WSCAI Futsal Cup
  - Winners: 2014

Republic of Ireland U-17

- UEFA Women's Under-17 Championship
  - Runner Up: 2010

Loreto School

- FAIS Senior Girls Cup
  - Winners: 2011

Kilmacrennan Celtic

- WFAI Intermediate Cup
  - Winners: 2009

Hibernian

- Scottish Women's Premier League: 2024-25

=== Gaelic football ===
Donegal

- Ulster Senior Ladies' Championship
  - Winner: 2018
- All-Ireland Under-18 Ladies' Football Championship
  - Runner Up: 2010
