= 2013–14 Women's National League (Ireland) =

Women's National League
- Season: 2013–14
- Champions: Raheny United
- UEFA Women's Champions League: Raheny United
- Top goalscorer: Stephanie Roche (Peamount United)

The 2013–14 Women's National League was the third season of the Women's National League. This was the final season the league was sponsored by Bus Éireann. In June 2013 the Football Association of Ireland announced Galway W.F.C. as an expansion team for the upcoming season. Raheny United won their second WNL title and also win the 2013 FAI Women's Cup. Meanwhile, Wexford Youths won their first trophy, the 2014 WNL Cup, with a 3–0 over Castlebar Celtic. Julie-Ann Russell of Peamount United was named 2013–14 Player of the Season.

The WNL received international publicity in October 2013 when Stephanie Roche scored an acclaimed goal for Peamount United against Wexford Youths which became popular on YouTube. Footage of the goal was uploaded to the internet by team manager Eileen Gleeson as the matches were not televised. Later that year Roche, James Rodríguez and Robin van Persie were finalists for the 2014 FIFA Puskás Award, for the best goal of the year. At the 2014 FIFA Ballon d'Or awards ceremony on 12 January 2015, Roche finished in second place to Rodríguez with 33% of the vote.

== Final table ==
Pos	Team	Pld	W	D	L	GF	GA	GD	Pts	Qualification
1	Raheny United (C)	21	18	3	0	84	19	+65	57	UEFA Women's Champions League
2	Peamount United	21	17	3	1	86	18	+68	54	
3	Wexford Youths	21	8	7	6	46	38	+8	31	
4	Castlebar Celtic	21	8	5	8	42	40	+2	29	
5	DLR Waves	21	7	6	8	34	38	−4	27	
6	Galway W.F.C.	21	8	2	11	43	42	+1	26	
7	Shamrock Rovers	21	4	2	15	28	61	−33	14	
8	Cork Women's F.C.	21	0	0	21	2	109	−107	0	

(C) Champions

== WNL Awards ==
Senior Player of the Year

- Julie-Ann Russell (Peamount United)

Young Player of the Year

- Katie McCabe (Raheny United)

Top Goalscorer Award

- Stephanie Roche (Peamount United)

Hall of Fame Award

- Sylvia Gee (DLR Waves)

Team of the Season

No.	Pos.	Player	Date of birth (age)	Caps	Club
1	GK	Niamh Reid Burke			Raheny United
2	DF	Méabh De Búrca			Galway W.F.C.
3	DF	Karen Duggan			Peamount United
4	DF	Jessica Gleeson			Wexford Youths
5	DF	Emma Hansberry			Castlebar Celtic
6	MF	Ciara Grant			Raheny United
7	MF	Áine O'Gorman			Peamount United
8	MF	Stephanie Roche			Peamount United
9	FW	Lynsey McKey			Galway W.F.C.
10	FW	Sinead Taylor			Galway W.F.C.
11	FW	Julie-Ann Russell			Peamount United
