= Castlebar Celtic W.F.C. =

Irish association football club

- Full name: Castlebar Celtic; Women's Football Club
- Ground: Celtic Park; Castlebar
- Capacity: 1,500
- League: Mayo Women's Football League
Home colours

Castlebar Celtic W.F.C. is an Irish association football club based in Castlebar, County Mayo. The club is the women's section of Castlebar Celtic and has entered teams in the Women's National League, the Mayo Women's Football League and the FAI Women's Cup.

== History ==
=== Women's National League ===
In 2011–12, together with Peamount United, Cork Women's F.C., Raheny United, Shamrock Rovers and Wexford Youths, Castlebar Celtic became founder members of the Women's National League. On 18 November 2012 Castlebar Celtic's manager, Jeremy Dee, died in a car crash while travelling to a league match against Shamrock Rovers. Dee was described as "the real driving force behind our women's team" by club secretary Michael O'Dwyer. He was also a leading advocate of women's association football in both County Mayo and Ireland. While playing in the league, Celtic reached three cup finals. In 2013 they played in WNL Cup final, but lost 6–3 to Peamount United. Later in the same year they reached the FAI Women's Cup final but lost 3–2 after extra-time to Raheny United. In 2014 they were WNL Cup finalists again but were beaten 3–0 by Wexford Youths.

=== Withdrawal from leagues ===
Castlebar Celtic had planned to enter a team in the 2015 Mayo Women's Football League season but withdrew due to a lack of players. During the 2015–16 Women's National League season they struggled. In October 2015 Castlebar Celtic failed to field a team for a WNL Shield game against Shelbourne Ladies. During the course of the regular season Celtic had suffered two heavy defeats. On 10 October 2015 they lost 9–1 at home to Shelbourne Ladies. Then on 2 January 2016 they lost 17–1 to Wexford Youths. On 20 February 2016 they suffered a third heavy loss after losing 12–1 to Shelbourne Ladies in the WNL Cup Before the season was finished they also withdrew from the Women's National League, again because they were unable to field a team.

== Notable former players ==
=== Republic of Ireland women's internationals ===
- (Republic of Ireland) Emma Hansberry
- (Republic of Ireland) Emma Mullin
- (Republic of Ireland) Jessica Nolan
- (Republic of Ireland) Sarah Rowe

== Honours ==
- FAI Women's Cup
  - Runners-up: 2013: 1
- WNL Cup
  - Runners-up: 2013, 2014: 2
- Mayo Women's Football League
  - Winners: 2009, 2011: 2
- Mayo Cup
  - Winners: 2009, 2011: 2
- Mary Walsh Cup
  - Winners: 2009, 2010, 2011: 3
