= Peamount United F.C. =

Peamount United
- Full name: Peamount United F.C.
- Nickname: The Peas
- Founded: 1983
- Ground: Greenogue
- Chairman: Seamus Martin
- Manager: Alban Hysa
- League: Women's National League (women); Leinster Senior League (men)
- 2025: 6th
- Website: www.peamountutd.com
Home colours	Away colours

Peamount United Football Club is an Irish association football club based in Newcastle, County Dublin. The club is best known for its senior women's team, founder members and inaugural champions of the Women's National League in 2011–12. They have also represented the Republic of Ireland in Europe and in 2011–12 they became the first Republic of Ireland team, including men's teams, to qualify from their group for the knockout stages of a European competition. The club's senior men's team compete in the Leinster Senior League. Peamount United have also fielded teams in the Dublin Women's Soccer League, the Dublin and District Schoolboys League and the Metropolitan Girls league.

== History ==
=== 2010 treble ===
Peamount United won a "treble" in 2010, winning the Dublin Women's Soccer League, the DWSL Premier Cup and the FAI Women's Cup. The 4–2 FAI Women's Cup final win over Salthill Devon, secured by Áine O'Gorman's hat-trick, was Peamount's first Cup success, following two previous final defeats in 2005 and 2008.

In August 2011, Louise Quinn scored a hat-trick against ŽNK Krka, as Peamount won 7–0 in the UEFA Women's Champions League qualifying round in Slovenia. Peamount's Champions League run ended with a last-32 elimination by Paris Saint-Germain Féminine in September and October 2011, 5–0 on aggregate.

=== WNL era ===
In November 2011, together with Shamrock Rovers, Castlebar Celtic, Cork Women's F.C., Raheny United and Wexford Youths, Peamount United were founder members of the Women's National League. Peamount United were also the inaugural 2011–12 league champions, finishing three points clear of second placed Raheny United. They completed a league double by also winning the WNL Cup, defeating Shamrock Rovers 1–0 in the final. Stephanie Roche was the league's top goalscorer with 26 goals. She also scored the winner in the WNL Cup final. Roche formed a strike partnership with Sara Lawlor who contributed 15 goals to Peamount United's league success. Lawlor was named Player of the Season at the inaugural end of season awards ceremony.

Peamount were beaten 2–1 by Raheny United in the 2012 FAI Women's Cup final. Raheny also beat Peamount to the 2012–13 league title by one point. Peamount's Sara Lawlor was the top goalscorer with 28 goals, and won a second consecutive Player of the Year award. Although Peamount won the WNL Cup final, 6–3 over Castlebar Celtic in May 2013, to retain the trophy.

In 2013–14, while playing for Peamount United against Wexford Youths, Roche also scored an acclaimed goal which went viral on YouTube. The match was not televised but footage of the goal was uploaded to the internet by team manager Eileen Gleeson. Later that year Roche, James Rodríguez and Robin van Persie were finalists for the 2014 FIFA Puskás Award, for the best goal of the year. At the 2014 FIFA Ballon d'Or awards ceremony on 12 January 2015, Roche finished in second place to Rodríguez. Roche finished as Top Goalscorer in 2013–14, and Julie-Ann Russell was named WNL Player of the Season, but Peamount were edged out by one point in another close title race with Raheny United.

When WNL rivals DLR Waves secured backing from University College Dublin and became UCD Waves in 2014, Peamount's manager Eileen Gleeson departed to take over at UCD Bowl, taking several Peamount players with her. Peamount regrouped with new manager James O'Callaghan placing a strong emphasis on youth development. Peamount finished second in 2017 with Amber Barrett Top Goalscorer and WNL Player of the Season. Ahead of 2018 some experienced players including Áine O'Gorman and Karen Duggan returned to Peamount from the Waves, who had lost the backing of UCD. Peamount finished third in 2018, and lost the 2018 FAI Women's Cup final 1–0 to Wexford Youths, but did collect their first trophy for five years in a 2–1 WNL Cup final win over Wexford.

In 2019 Peamount recaptured the League title for the first time since 2011–12. They lost their second successive FAI Women's Cup final to Wexford Youths, 3–2 this time. In the delayed and shortened 2020 season Peamount retained their WNL title with Áine O'Gorman as Top Goalscorer and Karen Duggan as Player of the Year. In the 2020 FAI Women's Cup Final Peamount thrashed Cork City 6–0 at Tallaght Stadium to secure a "double".

A dramatic conclusion to the 2021 season saw defending champions Peamount United unexpectedly squander a two-goal lead to lose 5–2 at home to Galway on the final match day, allowing Shelbourne to claim the title with their 3–2 win over Wexford Youths. Both matches were subject to live television coverage, following the WNL's agreement of a broadcast arrangement with TG4 in September 2021.

During the season a number of Peamount's players transferred to professional clubs in England and Scotland without the club receiving any compensation. Manager James O'Callaghan called for the formation of a task force, to examine the possibility of making the WNL semi-professional in future: "It's great for those players that they are getting to play professionally, but it's not great for the league to be losing them." Before the 2022 season "exploratory negotiations" on a merger with Shamrock Rovers failed.

== Players ==
=== Current squad ===
As of 7 July 2026

Note: Flags indicate national team as defined under FIFA eligibility rules; some limited exceptions apply. Players may hold more than one non-FIFA nationality.

No.	Pos.	Nation	Player
1	GK	IRL	Ciara Glackin
2	DF	IRL	Meabh Russell
3	DF	IRL	Della Doherty
4	DF	IRL	Abby Tuthill
5	DF	IRL	Mary Phillips
7	FW	IRL	Aoife Murphy O'Connor
8	MF	IRL	Carlie Sinnott
9	FW	IRL	Mia Gaff
10	FW	IRL	Eleanor Ryan-Doyle
11	MF	IRL	Freya Healy
12	DF	IRL	Kaitlyn Delahunty
13	GK	IRL	Amy Mahon

No.	Pos.	Nation	Player
15	MF	IRL	Mia McGonnell
16	DF	IRL	Ciara O'Neill
17	DF	IRL	Dearbháile Beirne
19	MF	IRL	Ailbhe White
20	MF	IRL	Millie Daly
33	DF	IRL	Robin Baird
34	MF	IRL	Mia Murtagh
35	MF	IRL	Carla McManus
37	DF	IRL	Katie Lovely
40	GK	IRL	Summer Lawless
—	DF	IRL	Lucy O'Rourke

=== Former players ===
WNL Top Goalscorer

- (Republic of Ireland) Stephanie Roche – 2011–12, 2013–14
- (Republic of Ireland) Sara Lawlor – 2012–13
- (Republic of Ireland) Amber Barrett – 2016, 2017

WNL Player of the Season

- (Republic of Ireland) Sara Lawlor – 2011–12, 2012–13
- (Republic of Ireland) Julie-Ann Russell – 2013–14
- (Republic of Ireland) Amber Barrett – 2017

FIFA Puskás Award nominee

- (Republic of Ireland) Stephanie Roche – 2014

Others
Ireland women's field hockey international

- (Ireland) Emily Beatty
- (Republic of Ireland) Katie Taylor – Irish, European, World and Olympic boxing champion

Scotland women's international

- (Scotland) Vaila Barsley

== Peamount United in Europe ==
=== 2011–12 UEFA Women's Champions League ===
After winning the 2010 FAI Women's Cup, Peamount United qualified for the 2011–12 UEFA Women's Champions League. They finished second in their group and, as the best runners-up, they qualified for the Round of 32. They were the first Republic of Ireland team, including men's team, to qualify for the knockout stages of a European competition.

==== Squad ====
Note: Flags indicate national team as defined under FIFA eligibility rules; some limited exceptions apply. Players may hold more than one non-FIFA nationality.

No.	Pos.	Nation	Player
1	GK	IRL	Linda Meehan
2	DF	IRL	Nicola Sinnott
3	DF	IRL	Grace Murray
4	DF	IRL	Sue Hackett
5	DF	IRL	Susan Byrne
6	MF	IRL	Emma Donohoe
7	MF	IRL	Rachel Jenkins
8	MF	IRL	Louise Quinn (captain)
9	MF	IRL	Wendy McGlone
10	MF	IRL	Ruth Comerford
11	FW	IRL	Sara Lawlor

No.	Pos.	Nation	Player
12	FW	IRL	Clare Kinsella
13	MF	IRL	Claire Walsh
14	FW	IRL	Karen Duggan
15	DF	IRL	Cathriona Dunne
16	FW	IRL	Stephanie Roche
17	MF	IRL	Dora Gorman
18	FW	IRL	Amanda Parkes
19	MF	IRL	Julie-Ann Russell
20	GK	IRL	Sarah Finnerty
21	GK	IRL	Eilish McManus
22	MF	IRL	Aoife Caulfield

==== Group 3 ====
Team	Pld	W	D	L	GF	GA	GD	Pts
(Spain) Rayo Vallecano	3	3	0	0	9	1	+8	9
(Republic of Ireland) Peamount United	3	2	0	1	12	2	+10	6
(Estonia) Pärnu JK	3	1	0	2	4	10	–6	3
(Slovenia) Krka (H)	3	0	0	3	1	13	–12	0

11 August 2011
15:45

Rayo Vallecano (Spain)	1–0	(Republic of Ireland) Peamount United
Natalia 90'	Report

Matija Gubec Stadium, Krško
Referee: Katalin Kulcsár (Hungary)
13 August 2011
20:45

Peamount United (Republic of Ireland)	7–0	(Slovenia) Krka
Roche 18', 33'; Lawlor 31', 78'; Quinn 37', 52', 65'	Report

Matija Gubec Stadium, Krško
Referee: Simona Ghisletta (Switzerland)
16 August 2011
17:00

Pärnu JK (Estonia)	1–5	(Republic of Ireland) Peamount United
Ivanova 56'	Report	Jenkins 5'; Lawlor 30', 33'; Roche 80', 90+2'

Ivančna Gorica Stadium, Ivančna Gorica
Referee: Gordana Kuzmanović (Serbia)

==== Round of 32 ====
28 September 2011
20:45
First leg

Peamount United (Republic of Ireland)	0–2	(France) Paris Saint-Germain
	Report	Coton-Pélagie 72'; Thomas 90+3'

Tallaght Stadium, Dublin
Attendance: 2,109
Referee: Ausra Kance (Lithuania)
5 October 2011
17:00
Second leg

Paris Saint-Germain (France)	3–0	(Republic of Ireland) Peamount United
Coton-Pélagie 49'; Debonne 66'; Dali 85'	Report

Stade Sébastien Charléty, Paris
Attendance: 1,956
Referee: Karolina Radzik-Johan (Poland)

Paris Saint-Germain won 5–0 on aggregate.

=== 2012–13 UEFA Women's Champions League ===
After winning the inaugural 2011–12 Women's National League, Peamount United qualified for the 2012–13 UEFA Women's Champions League.

==== Group 5 ====
Team	Pld	W	D	L	GF	GA	GD	Pts
(Bosnia and Herzegovina) SFK 2000 (H)	3	2	1	0	6	1	+5	7
(Republic of Ireland) Peamount United	3	2	0	1	9	4	+5	6
ASA Tel Aviv University	3	1	1	1	6	6	0	4
(Wales) Cardiff Met. Ladies	3	0	0	3	0	10	−10	0

11 August 2012
11:00

SFK 2000 (Bosnia and Herzegovina)	4–0	(Republic of Ireland) Peamount United
Šešlija 3'; Hadžić 30'; Fetahović 32', 43'	Report

Koševo City Stadium, Sarajevo
Referee: Sandra Braz Bastos (Portugal)
13 August 2012
11:00

Peamount United (Republic of Ireland)	5–0	ASA Tel Aviv University
Russell 5'; Lawlor 41', 62', 90'; Roche 58'	Report

Koševo City Stadium, Sarajevo
Referee: Ausra Kance (Lithuania)
16 August 2012
17:00

Cardiff Met. Ladies (Wales)	0–4	(Republic of Ireland) Peamount United
	Report	Roche 2', 58'; O'Sullivan 9'; Lawlor 48'

City Stadium SRC Slavija, Istočno Sarajevo
Referee: Ausra Kance (Lithuania)

== Honours ==
=== Women's team ===
- Women's National League
  - Winners (4): 2011–12, 2019, 2020, 2023
  - Runners-up (4): 2012–13, 2013–14, 2017, 2021
- FAI Women's Cup
  - Winners (2): 2010, 2020
  - Runners-up (5): 2005, 2008, 2012, 2018, 2019
- WNL Cup
  - Winners (3): 2012, 2013, 2018:
- Dublin Women's Soccer League
  - Winners (1): 2010
  - Runners-up (2): 2005, 2006
- DWSL Premier Cup
  - Winners (1): 2010
