= Megan Campbell =

Irish footballer (born 1993)

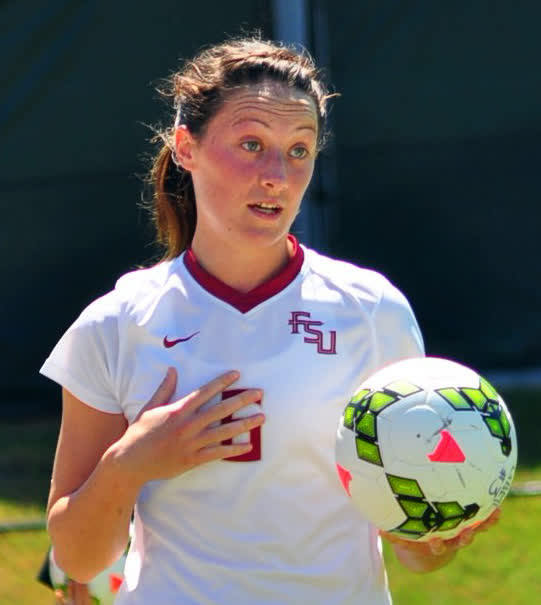
- Megan Campbell playing for FSU in September 2015

Personal information
- Date of birth: 28 June 1993 (age 33)
- Place of birth: Drogheda, Ireland
- Height: 1.73 m (5 ft 8 in)
- Positions: Centre back; left back

Youth career
- Grove Rangers
- Boyne Rovers
- Moneymore
- Shelbourne

College career
Years	Team	Apps	(Gls)
2013–2015	Florida State Seminoles	60	(4)

Senior career*
Years	Team	Apps	(Gls)
2010–2011	St Francis		
2011–2013	Raheny United		
2016–2021	Manchester City	42	(1)
2021–2023	Liverpool	27	(0)
2023	Everton	0	(0)
2023–2025	London City Lionesses	21	(1)

International career^{‡}
2010–2011	Republic of Ireland U17	4	(1)
2011–2025	Republic of Ireland	57	(4)

Managerial career
- 2025: Bolton Wanderers (assistant)
- * Club domestic league appearances and goals as of 6 May 2025 ‡ National team caps and goals as of 21 April 2025

Megan Campbell (born 28 June 1993) is an Irish former professional footballer who last played as a centre back for Women's Championship club London City Lionesses and as a left back & centre back for the Republic of Ireland women's national team.

She has previously played for St. Francis, Raheny United, Florida State Seminoles, Manchester City and Liverpool. In 2010, she was a member of the Republic of Ireland U-17 squad that were runners-up at the 2010 UEFA Women's Under-17 Championship and quarter-finalists at the 2010 FIFA U-17 Women's World Cup. Campbell is known as a long throw-in specialist and has been compared to Rory Delap. She holds the Guinness World Record for longest throw-in by a woman, at 37.55m.

== Early life ==
Campbell was born in Drogheda, County Louth and is the daughter of Eamonn and Suzanne Campbell. She is a granddaughter of The Dubliners lead guitarist, Eamonn Campbell. She has three sisters – Jaymee, Dawn and Jade. She grew up on Drogheda's Scarlet Street and was educated at Our Lady's College, Greenhills and at the Institute of Technology, Carlow. She also played youth football with local Drogheda teams – Grove Rangers, Boyne Rovers and Moneymore.

== Playing career ==
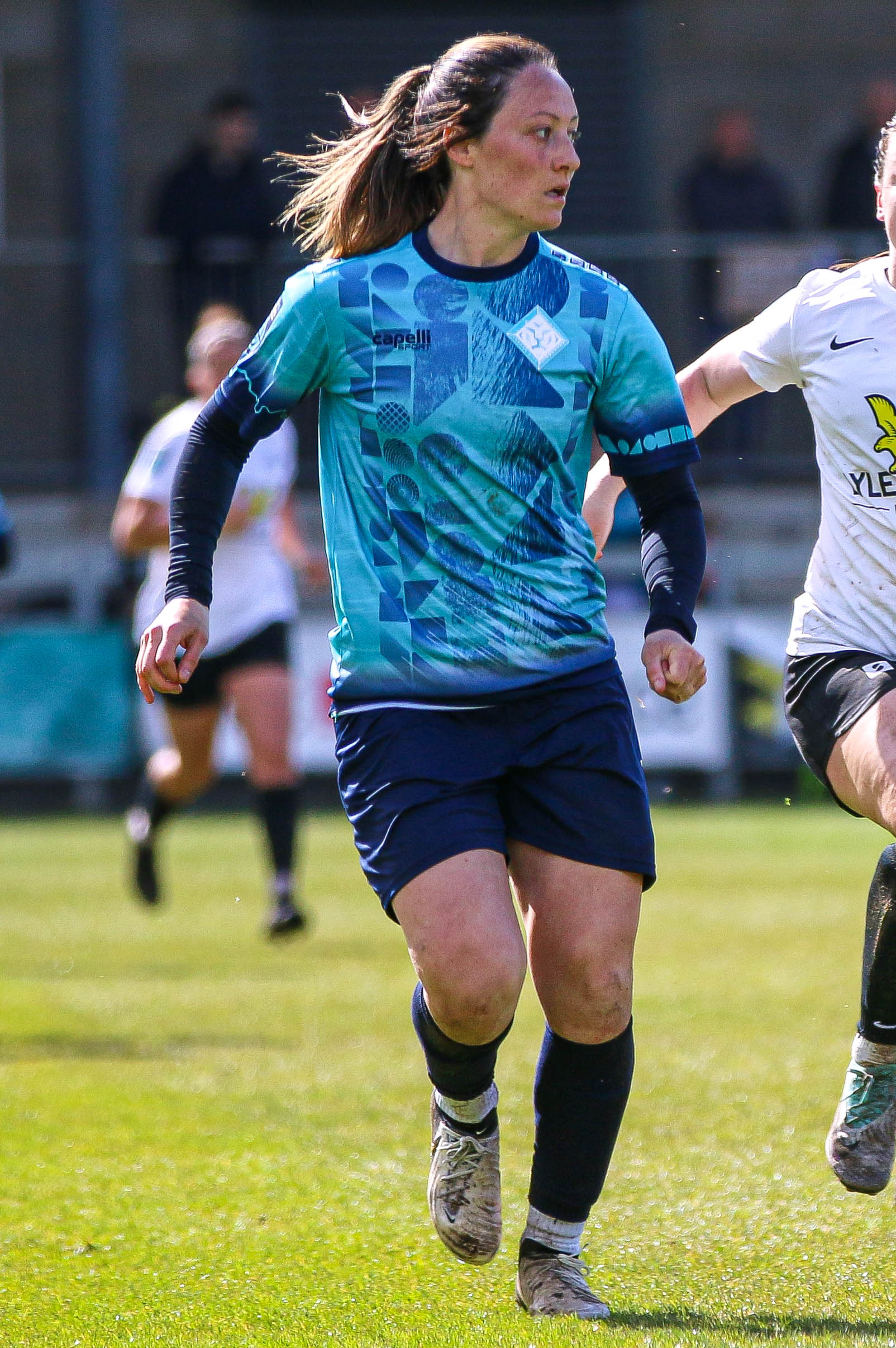
Campbell playing for London City Lionesses in 2024

=== St Francis ===
In 2009, four weeks after turning 16, Campbell came on as a substitute for St Francis in the FAI Women's Cup final against St Catherine's. Her teammates included Grainne Kierans and Mary Waldron. Campbell also played for St Francis in the 2009–10 and 2010–11 UEFA Women's Champions League group stage tournaments.

=== Raheny United ===
In 2012–13 Campbell was a member of the Raheny United team that won an FAI Women's Cup and Women's National League double. In October 2012, Raheny United defeated Peamount United 2–1 in the FAI Women's Cup final at Dalymount Park before going on to win the WNL title. Campbell was subsequently named in the 2012–13 WNL Team of the Season. Campbell's teammates at Raheny United included Katie McCabe, Mary Waldron, Noelle Murray, Ciara Grant and Siobhán Killeen.

=== Florida State Seminoles ===
In 2013 Campbell began playing for Florida State Seminoles after obtaining a scholarship to Florida State University, where she majored in social science. In her first three seasons with Florida State she has played in at least 60 games, excluding friendlies, and was credited with 31 assists. Between 2013 and 2015 she helped Florida State win three consecutive ACC titles. In 2014 Campbell was named in the ACC All-Tournament Team and in the 2015 ACC final she scored in the penalty shoot-out against Virginia Cavaliers. In 2013 Florida State were also runners up in the NCAA Division I Women's Soccer Championship before going on to win the title in 2014. In 2015 Campbell acted as a recruiter for Florida State when she approached fellow Republic of Ireland women's youth international, Megan Connolly, about playing for the Seminoles.

Campbell had been described as a senior in Florida State Seminoles' 2014 title-winning season and had been expected to feature in the 2015 NWSL College Draft. But it was discovered she had another year of college eligibility remaining and wished to use that instead. After completing her college career, Campbell was also "noticeably absent" from the 2016 NWSL College Draft.

=== Manchester City ===
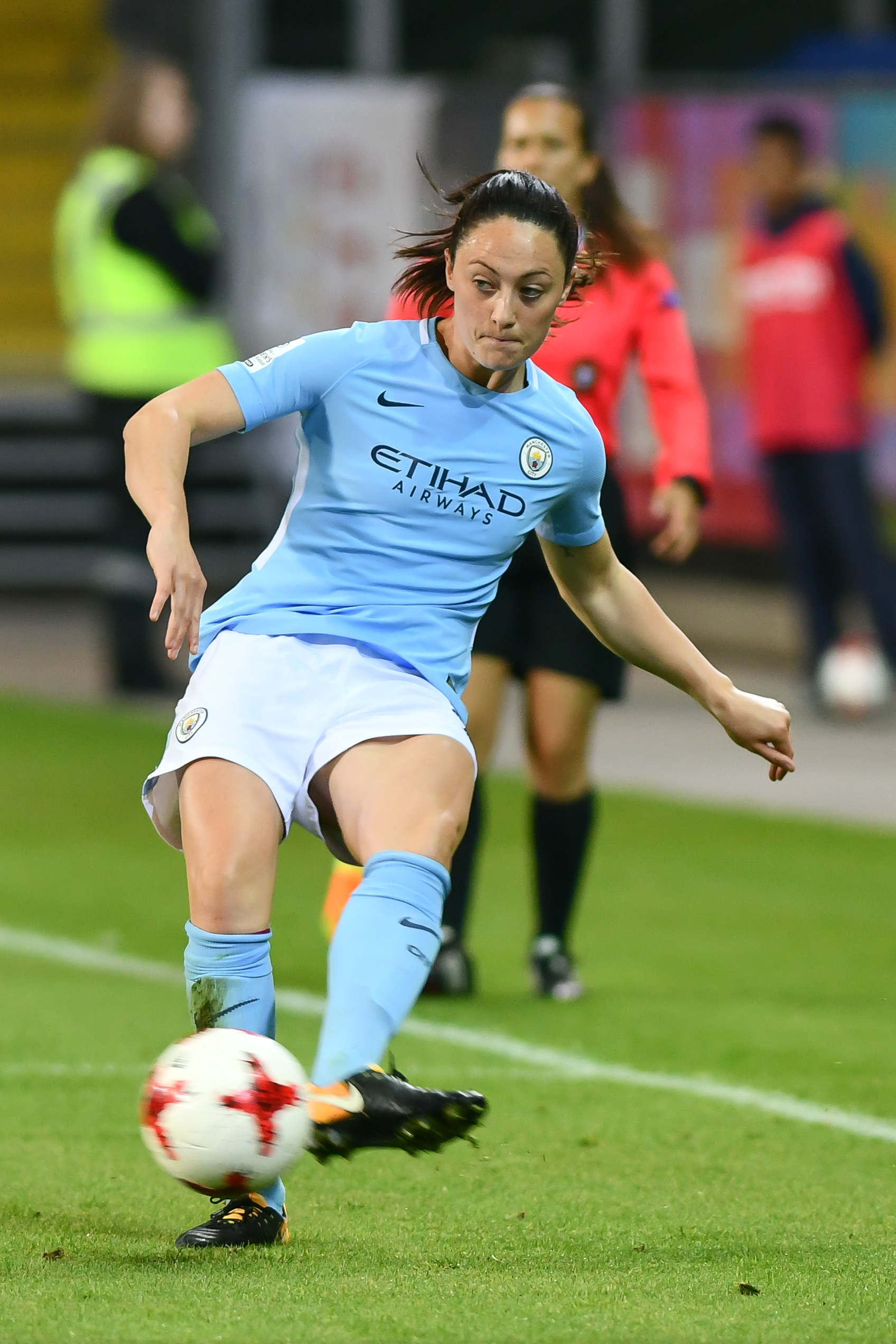
Playing for Manchester City in 2017

In February 2016 Campbell became Manchester City's fourth signing of the off-season, announcing that she had signed a professional contract with the English UEFA Women's Champions League contenders. She won a domestic treble with the club, then signed a contract extension in June 2017. Campbell had played particularly well in the 2017 FA Women's Cup Final, serving two assists as Manchester City beat Birmingham City 4–1 at Wembley Stadium.

She suffered an anterior cruciate ligament injury in November 2017 during a UEFA Women's Champions League match against LSK Kvinner FK and was ruled out for several months. In June 2020 she signed a new one-year contract with Manchester City while recovering from another long-term injury, this time to tendons in her foot.

=== Liverpool ===
In June 2021, Women's Championship club Liverpool signed Campbell, after her five-year spell at Manchester City. She overcame some injury-related absence in the first part of the 2021–22 season to become an important member of the title-winning Liverpool team who won promotion back to the Women's Super League. She signed a new contract with Liverpool in June 2022.

=== Everton ===
On 29 September 2023, Everton signed Campbell on a short-term deal.

=== London City Lionesses ===
On 31 January 2024, transfer deadline day, London City Lionesses signed Campbell on an 18-month contract following the expiration of her contract with Everton. She departed in May 2025 after the sides promotion to the WSL.

== Coaching career ==
=== Bolton Wanderers ===
In August 2025, Campbell joined Bolton Wanderers Women as Assistant Player Coach. The club said ''Megan will combine her coaching commitments with Bolton alongside her playing career elsewhere''. Three months later, Bolton Wanderers confirmed the departure of Campbell, alongside Manager Myles Smith on 1 October 2025.

=== Liverpool ===
Campbell was appointed as PGA U21 Head Coach at her former club in July 2026.

== International career ==
=== Youth ===
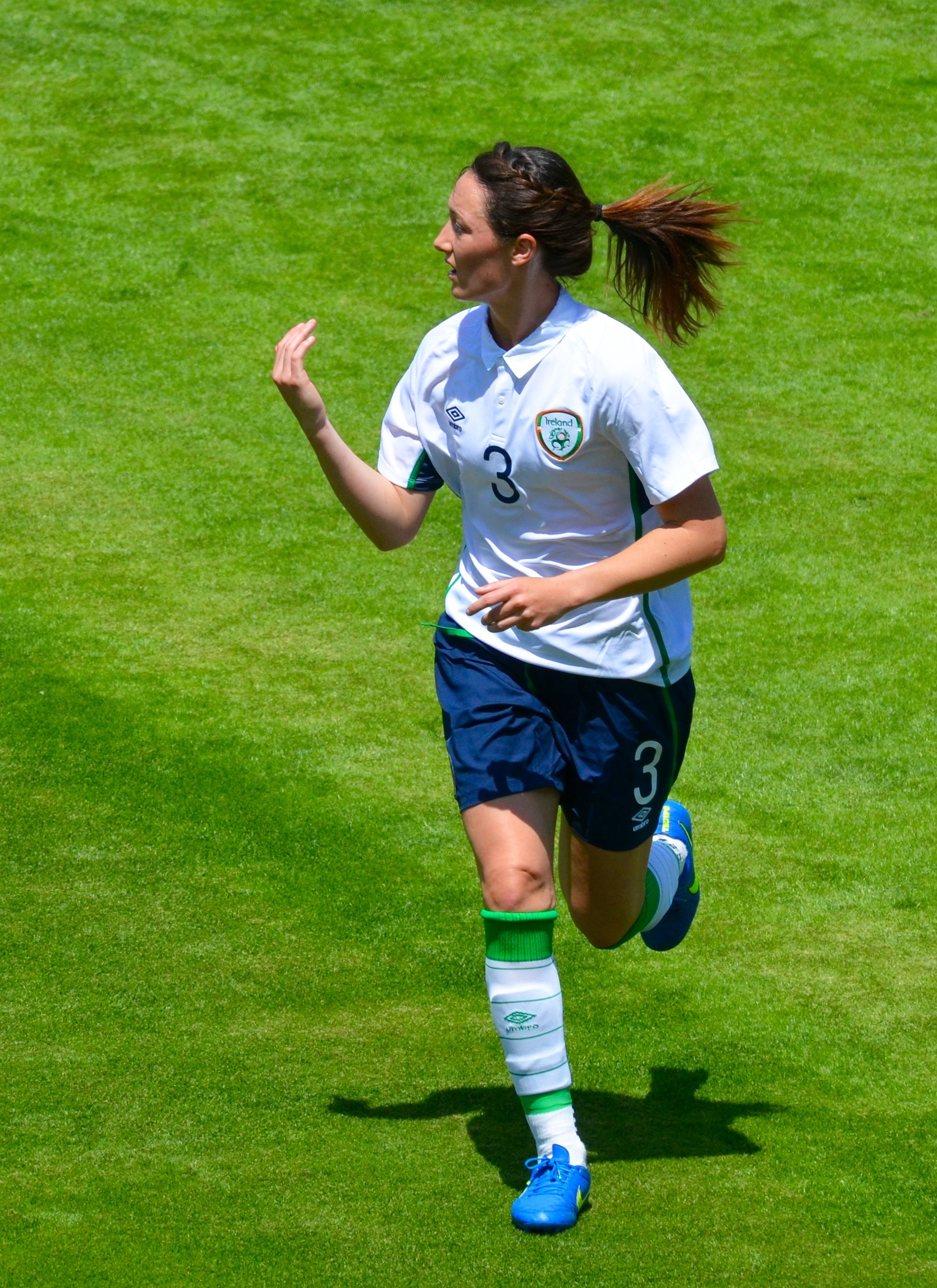
Megan Campbell playing for Republic of Ireland against United States on 10 May 2015

Campbell has represented the Republic of Ireland at U-17, U-19 and senior level. In 2010 she was a member of the Republic of Ireland U-17 squad that were runners-up in the 2010 UEFA Women's Under-17 Championship and quarter-finalists in the 2010 FIFA U-17 Women's World Cup. In the UEFA championship, Campbell scored twice: the winner in 2–1 group victory against Sweden and the semi-final goal in the 1–0 win over Germany. In the World Cup, Campbell scored the opening goal in a 3–0 win against Ghana.

=== Senior ===
Campbell played for a senior Republic of Ireland team of home-based players in a behind closed doors match against Northern Ireland. She then won her first official cap in a friendly against Switzerland at Richmond Park in August 2011. Campbell came on as substitute for Louise Quinn after 62 minutes during the 1–0 defeat by the Swiss. On 5 April 2014 in a 2015 FIFA Women's World Cup qualifier against Germany at Tallaght Stadium, Campbell provided two assists with throw-ins. Despite Campbell's effort the Republic of Ireland lost 3–2.

After a two-year absence due to injuries, Campbell was called up to the senior Republic of Ireland squad again in February 2022, for the 2022 Pinatar Cup in Murcia. On 1 September 2022 Campbell started her first competitive national team match for three years in Ireland's play-off-securing 1–0 2023 FIFA Women's World Cup qualification – UEFA Group A win over Finland at Tallaght Stadium. She was not chosen for the squad to participate in the 2023 FIFA Women's World Cup squad.

=== International ===
Appearances and goals by national team and year
National team	Year	Apps	Goals
Republic of Ireland	2011	4	0
Republic of Ireland	2012	8	0
Republic of Ireland	2013	7	1
Republic of Ireland	2014	7	0
Republic of Ireland	2015	7	1
Republic of Ireland	2016	2	0
Republic of Ireland	2017	4	1
Republic of Ireland	2019	3	0
Republic of Ireland	2022	4	1
Republic of Ireland	2023	1	0
Total		47	4

=== International goals ===
Scores and results list Republic of Ireland's goals first. Score column indicates score after each Campbell goal. Updated as of 5 May 2023.

International goals scored by Megan Campbell
No.	Cap	Date	Venue	Opponent	Score	Result	Competition	Ref.
1	13	6 March 2013	Tasos Markou, Paralimni	Northern Ireland	3–1	5–1	2013 Cyprus Cup	
2	28	11 March 2015	Valbruna, Rovinj	Costa Rica	2–0	2–1	2015 Istria Cup	
3	38	19 September 2017	Mourneview Park, Lurgan	Northern Ireland	2–0	2–0	2019 FIFA Women's World Cup UEFA qual. Group 3	
4	46	14 November 2022	Estadio Municipal de Marbella, Marbella	Morocco	1–0	4–0	Friendly	

== Playing style ==
According to her Liverpool manager Matt Beard, Campbell is an adaptable left-sided defensive player: "Meg offers a bit of versatility as she can play centre-back or left-back". Throughout her career she has been renowned as a long throw-in specialist: "Fortunately, my arms are quite hyper-mobile and can go further back than the average person". In 2020 Campbell declared that she wanted to be known for more than her exceptionally long throw-ins and persistent injuries. In April 2025 at the London City Lionesses, Kent training ground. Campbell broke the Guinness World Record for the longest ever throw-in by a female footballer at 37.55m.

== Honours ==
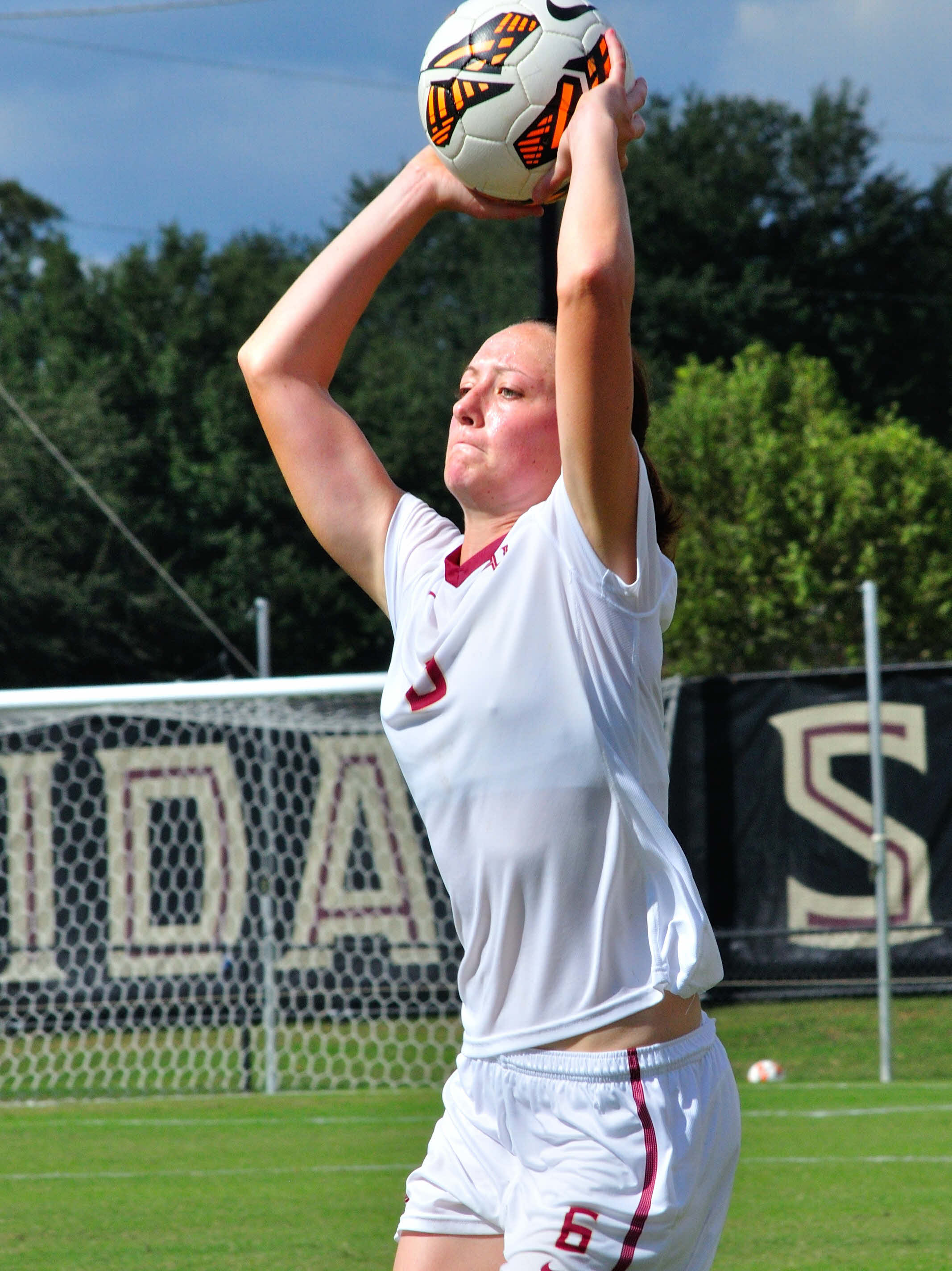
Campbell unleashing her long throw-in, October 2014

=== Individual ===
- 2012–13 WNL Team of the Season
- 2014 ACC All-Tournament Team

=== Team ===
Manchester City

- FA Women's Cup: 2019-20

St Francis

- FAI Women's Cup
  - Winner: 2009

Raheny United

- Women's National League
  - Winner: 2012–13
- FAI Women's Cup
  - Winner: 2012

Florida State Seminoles

- NCAA Division I Women's Soccer Championship
  - Winner: 2014
  - Runner Up: 2013
- ACC Women's Soccer Tournament
  - Winner: 2013, 2014, 2015: 3

Republic of Ireland U-17

- UEFA Women's Under-17 Championship
  - Runner Up: 2010
