= 2012–13 Women's National League (Ireland) =

Women's National League
- Season: 2012–13
- Champions: Raheny United
- UEFA Women's Champions League: Raheny United
- Top goalscorer: Sara Lawlor (Peamount United); 28

The 2012–13 Women's National League was the second season of the Women's National League. This season was again sponsored by Bus Éireann. The six founding members of the league – Peamount United, Castlebar Celtic, Cork Women's F.C., Raheny United, Shamrock Rovers and Wexford Youths – were joined for the second season by DLR Waves. Raheny United won their first of two WNL titles. They also complete a league and cup double after already winning the 2012 FAI Women's Cup. Peamount United won the 2013 WNL Cup with a 6–3 win over Castlebar Celtic. Sara Lawlor of Peamount United was the top league goalscorer with 28 goals. She also won a second consecutive Player of the Season award.

== Final table ==
Pos	Team	Pld	W	D	L	GF	GA	GD	Pts	Qualification
1	Raheny United (C)	18	14	3	1	55	19	+36	45	2013–14 UEFA Women's Champions League
2	Peamount United	18	14	2	2	80	25	+55	44	
3	Wexford Youths	18	9	4	5	34	21	+13	31	
4	Castlebar Celtic	18	7	1	10	30	49	−19	22	
5	DLR Waves	18	5	1	12	25	46	−21	16	
6	Cork Women's F.C.	18	4	2	12	24	52	−28	14	
7	Shamrock Rovers	18	2	3	13	16	52	−36	9	

(C) Champions

== Top goalscorers ==
Goals	Player	Club
28	Sara Lawlor	Peamount United
22	Stephanie Roche	Peamount United
15	Rebecca Creagh	Raheny United
11	Rianna Jarrett	Wexford Youths
11	Emma Mullin	Castlebar Celtic

== WNL Awards ==
Senior Player of the Year

- Sara Lawlor (Peamount United)

Young Player of the Year

- Rianna Jarrett (Wexford Youths)

Top Goalscorer Award

- Sara Lawlor (Peamount United)

Service to Women's Football Award

- Jeremy Dee (Castlebar Celtic)

Team of the Season

No.	Pos.	Player	Date of birth (age)	Caps	Club
1	GK	Mary Rose Kelly			Wexford Youths
2	DF	Seana Cooke			Raheny United
3	DF	Megan Campbell			Raheny United
4	DF	Lauren Dwyer			Wexford Youths
5	DF	Karen Duggan			Peamount United
6	MF	Sylvia Gee			DLR Waves
7	MF	Sarah Rowe			Castlebar Celtic
8	MF	Caroline Thorpe			Raheny United
9	FW	Rianna Jarrett			Wexford Youths
10	FW	Sara Lawlor			Peamount United
11	FW	Julie-Ann Russell			Peamount United
