= Raheny United F.C. =

Association football club in Raheny, Dublin

Raheny United
- Full name: Raheny United Football Club
- Nickname: The Pandas
- Founded: 1994
- Ground: St. Anne's Park
- Chairman: Aidan O’Looney
- League: Dublin District Schoolboy League; North Dublin Schoolboys/Girls League; Athletic Union League; Amateur Football League
- Website: www.rahenyunited.ie
| Home colours | Away colours |

Raheny United Football Club is an Irish association football club based in Raheny, Dublin. Raheny United was founded in 1994 following the amalgamation of Raheny Boys and Dunseedy United. An over–35s team compete in the Amateur Football League. They also have 35 schoolboy teams competing in both the Dublin & District Schoolboy League and the North Dublin Schoolboys/Girls League.

The club's senior women's team became founder members of the Women's National League in 2011–12. They were league champions in both 2012–13 and 2013–14 and also competed in both the 2013–14 and the 2014–15 UEFA Women's Champions League. In 2015 Raheny United's senior women's team merged with Shelbourne Ladies F.C., with Shelbourne taking Raheny United's place in the Women's National League. The club currently cater for four senior teams, thirty schoolboy teams, and host their own youth academy every Saturday morning, making them one of the larger junior soccer clubs in Ireland.

== History ==
Raheny United was founded in 1994 following the amalgamation of Raheny Boys and Dunseedy United. In November 2003, the clubhouse was redeveloped to include dressing rooms, players lounge, a gym and a bar.

=== Women's National League (2011–2015) ===
In August 2011 the Football Association of Ireland announced that Raheny United would be one of seven founding members of the Women's National League (WNL). In their debut season, 2011–12, Raheny finished as runners-up to Peamount United. The following two seasons, 2012–13 and 2013–14, saw them finish as league champions. They also won the FAI Women's Cup in 2012, 2013 and 2014. In the 2013–14 UEFA Women's Champions League they finished third in their qualifying group. In the 2014–15 UEFA Women's Champions League they became the first Irish team to qualify from the group stage with a 100% record, having beaten CFF Olimpia Cluj, FC NSA Sofia and Hibernians F.C. In the round of 32 they lost to Bristol Academy.

In 2015, the women's senior team merged with Shelbourne Ladies, who fielded teams in the Metropolitan Girls League, the Dublin Women’s League and Leinster Leagues. This effectively saw Shelbourne take Raheny United's place in the WNL.

=== Post merger ===
In 2015, the club entered into a partnership with Dublin City Council and Raheny GAA for the creation of an all-weather pitch in St. Anne's Park. The pitch opened in May 2017 with floodlights to facilitate seasonal training. In 2017–18 the club's senior men's team competed in the Premier A division of the Athletic Union League. As of August 2023, the men's team had moved to the Leinster Senior League.

== Club identity ==
The club's colours are black and white. Their kit is black and white striped shirts, black shorts with black socks.

== Raheny United in Europe ==
=== 2013–14 UEFA Women's Champions League ===
==== Group 3 ====
| Pos | Team | Pld | W | D | L | GF | GA | GD | Pts | Qualification | MTK | Z1K | RAH | CNS |
|---|---|---|---|---|---|---|---|---|---|---|---|---|---|---|
| 1 | (Hungary) MTK | 3 | 3 | 0 | 0 | 6 | 2 | +4 | 9 | Advance to main round | — | – | 3–2 | 2–0 |
| 2 | (Ukraine) Zhytlobud-1 Kharkiv | 3 | 2 | 0 | 1 | 7 | 2 | +5 | 6 | | 0–1 | — | – | 5–0 |
| 3 | (Republic of Ireland) Raheny United | 3 | 1 | 0 | 2 | 5 | 6 | −1 | 3 | | – | 1–2 | — | – |
| 4 | (Northern Ireland) Crusaders Strikers | 3 | 0 | 0 | 3 | 1 | 9 | −8 | 0 | | – | – | 1–2 | — |

Source: UEFA
8 August 2013
14:00

| MTK (Hungary) | 3–2 | (Republic of Ireland) Raheny United |
|---|---|---|
| Vágó 12', 39'; Papp 69' | Report | McCabe 15'; Creagh 52' |

Seaview, Belfast
Referee: Christina W. Pedersen (Norway)
10 August 2013
14:00

| Raheny United (Republic of Ireland) | 1–2 | (Ukraine) Zhytlobud-1 Kharkiv |
|---|---|---|
| Murray 16' | Report | Ovdiychuk 39'; Tykhonova 44' (pen.) |

Seaview, Belfast
Referee: Stéphanie Frappart (France)
13 August 2013
16:00

| Crusaders Strikers (Northern Ireland) | 1–2 | (Republic of Ireland) Raheny United |
|---|---|---|
| McDowell 11' | Report | Murray 29'; Waldron 58' |

Seaview, Belfast
Referee: Stéphanie Frappart (France)

=== 2014–15 UEFA Women's Champions League ===
==== Group 2 ====
| Pos | Team | Pld | W | D | L | GF | GA | GD | Pts | Qualification | RAH | CLU | SOF | HIB |
|---|---|---|---|---|---|---|---|---|---|---|---|---|---|---|
| 1 | (Republic of Ireland) Raheny United | 3 | 3 | 0 | 0 | 6 | 2 | +4 | 9 | Advance to knockout phase | — | — | 2–0 | — |
| 2 | (Romania) Olimpia Cluj (H) | 3 | 2 | 0 | 1 | 10 | 3 | +7 | 6 | | 1–2 | — | — | 5–0 |
| 3 | (Bulgaria) NSA Sofia | 3 | 1 | 0 | 2 | 6 | 6 | 0 | 3 | | — | 1–4 | — | 5–0 |
| 4 | (Malta) Hibernians | 3 | 0 | 0 | 3 | 1 | 12 | −11 | 0 | | 1–2 | — | — | — |

Source: UEFA
Rules for classification: Group stage tiebreakers
(H) Hosts
9 August 2014
17:30

| Olimpia Cluj (Romania) | 1–2 | (Republic of Ireland) Raheny United |
|---|---|---|
| Voicu 62' | Report | Murray 23'; Shine 81' |

Cluj Arena, Cluj-Napoca
Attendance: 300
Referee: Elia Martínez (Spain)

11 August 2014
14:00

| Raheny United (Republic of Ireland) | 2–0 | (Bulgaria) NSA Sofia |
|---|---|---|
| Shine 45+2', 50' | Report |

Cluj Arena, Cluj-Napoca
Attendance: 30
Referee: Ana Minić (Serbia)

14 August 2014
17:00

| Hibernians (Malta) | 1–2 | (Republic of Ireland) Raheny United |
|---|---|---|
| Tonna 15' | Report | Cronin 38'; Shine 79' |

Stadionul Victoria Someșeni, Cluj-Napoca
Attendance: 45
Referee: Tânia Morais (Luxembourg)

=== Rround of 32 ===
==== First leg ====
9 October 2014
20:30

| Raheny United (Republic of Ireland) | 0–4 | (England) Bristol Academy |
|---|---|---|
| | Report | Harding 29', 78'; Watts 90+2' (pen.); Natalia 90+4' |

Richmond Park, Dublin
Attendance: 1,248
Referee: Eleni Lampadariou (Greece)

==== Second leg ====
16 October 2014
20:30

| Bristol Academy (England) | 2–1 | (Republic of Ireland) Raheny United |
|---|---|---|
| Natalia 50'; James 59' | Report | Slattery 74' |

Ashton Gate Stadium, Bristol
Attendance: 816
Referee: Marija Kurtes (Germany)

Bristol Academy won 6–1 on aggregate.

== Location ==
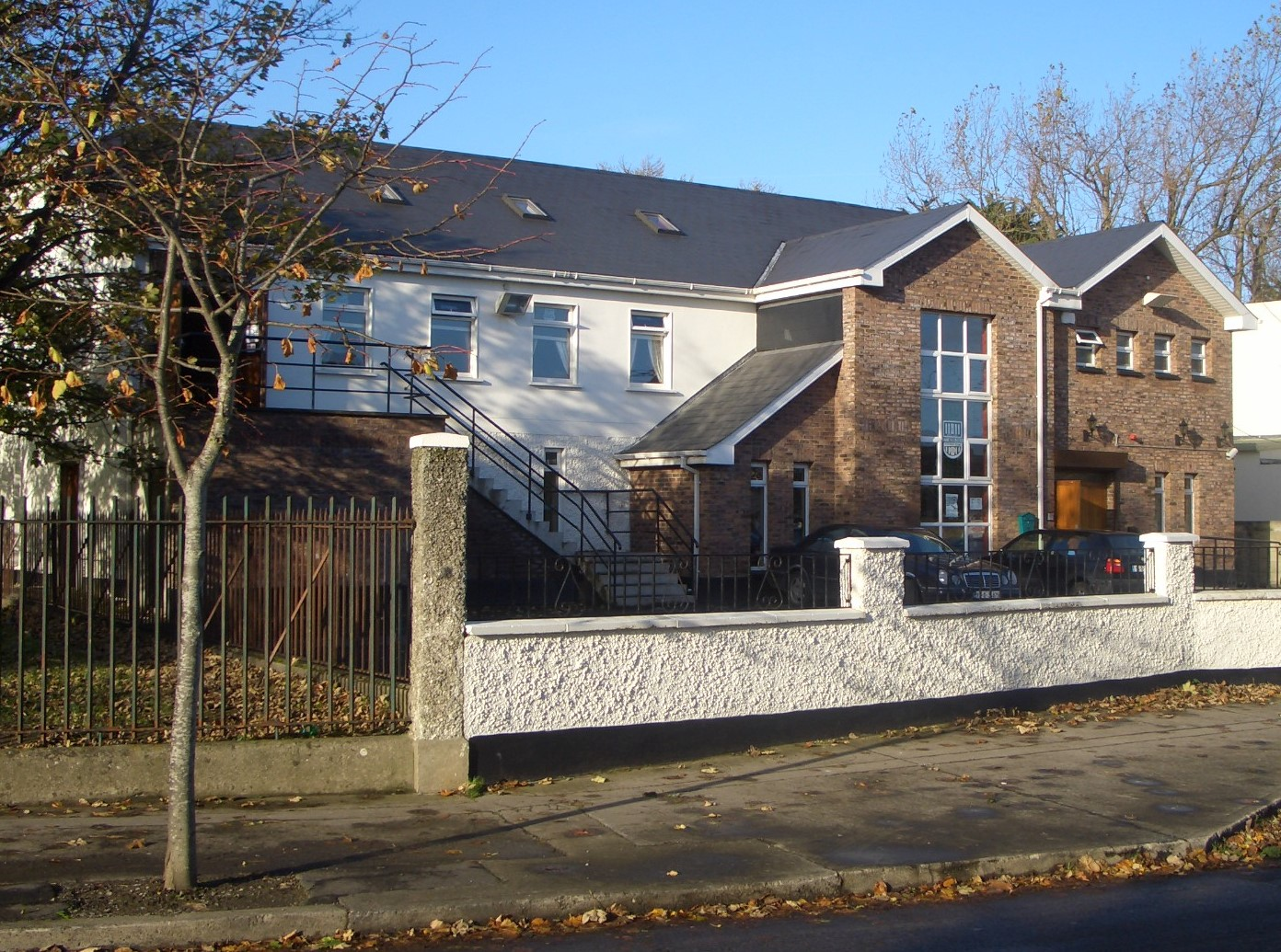
Raheny United Football Club, All Saints Drive

Raheny United's clubhouse is located on All Saints Drive beside both the local Garda station and Raheny GAA club. It is also near Raheny railway station. The club plays the majority of their home games at the nearby St. Anne's Park.

== Notable former players ==
=== Republic of Ireland women's internationals ===
- (Republic of Ireland) Diane Caldwell
- (Republic of Ireland) Megan Campbell
- (Republic of Ireland) Ciara Grant
- (Republic of Ireland) Siobhán Killeen
- (Republic of Ireland) Katie McCabe
- (Republic of Ireland) Noelle Murray
- (Republic of Ireland) Olivia O'Toole
- (Republic of Ireland) Niamh Reid Burke
- (Republic of Ireland) Sarah Rowe
- (Republic of Ireland) Stephanie Roche
- (Republic of Ireland) Clare Shine
- (Republic of Ireland) Caroline Thorpe
- (Republic of Ireland) Mary Waldron

== Honours ==
=== Women's team ===
- Women's National League
  - Winners: 2012–13, 2013–14 : 2
  - Runners-up: 2011–12: 1
- FAI Women's Cup
  - Winners: 2012, 2013, 2014: 3
  - Runners-up: 2007: 1
- WNL Cup
  - Winners: 2015: 1
