= 2011–12 Women's National League (Ireland) =

Women's National League
- Season: 2011–12
- Champions: Peamount United
- UEFA Women's Champions League: Peamount United
- Top goalscorer: Stephanie Roche (Peamount United): 24
- Biggest home win: Peamount United; 13–0 Castlebar Celtic
- Biggest away win: Castlebar Celtic; 0–9 Peamount United
- Highest scoring: Peamount United; 13–0 Castlebar Celtic

The 2011–12 Women's National League season was the inaugural season of the Women's National League. The season was sponsored by Bus Éireann. Originally seven clubs were invited to join the league. However shortly before the start of the season Bray Wanderers/St. Joseph's pulled out due to a lack of competitive players. This left six teams – Peamount United, Castlebar Celtic, Cork Women's F.C., Raheny United, Shamrock Rovers and Wexford Youths – to play the inaugural season.

The season began on 13 November 2011 with Wexford Youths and Castlebar Celtic drawing 2–2, Raheny United defeating Shamrock Rovers 5–0 and Stephanie Roche scoring a hat-trick as Peamount United defeated Cork Women's F.C. 6–1. On 12 February 2012 Roche scored six goals as Peamount United defeated Castlebar Celtic 13–0 at home. The return fixture on 15 April saw Peamount United win 9–0 with Roche scoring another hat-trick. The final round of games was played on 22 April 2012.

Peamount United were the inaugural champions, finishing three points clear of second placed Raheny United. They also completed a league double by winning the WNL Cup, defeating Shamrock Rovers 1–0 in the final on 6 May 2012. Roche was the league's top goalscorer with 24 goals in the league itself plus two in the WNL Cup. She scored the winner in the WNL Cup final. Roche formed a "devastating" strike partnership with Sara Lawlor who contributed 15 goals to Peamount United's league success. Lawlor was named Player of the Season at the inaugural end of season awards ceremony, while Emma Hansberry of Castlebar Celtic won the Young Player of the Season.

== Final table ==
Pos	Team	Pld	W	D	L	GF	GA	GD	Pts	Qualification
1	Peamount United (C)	15	12	0	3	66	17	+49	36	2012–13 UEFA Women's Champions League
2	Raheny United	15	10	3	2	39	18	+21	33	
3	Cork Women's F.C.	15	6	2	7	22	29	−7	20	
4	Wexford Youths	15	5	5	5	21	32	−11	20	
5	Castlebar Celtic	15	3	4	8	30	57	−27	13	
6	Shamrock Rovers	15	1	2	12	13	38	−25	5	

(C) Champions

== Top goalscorers ==
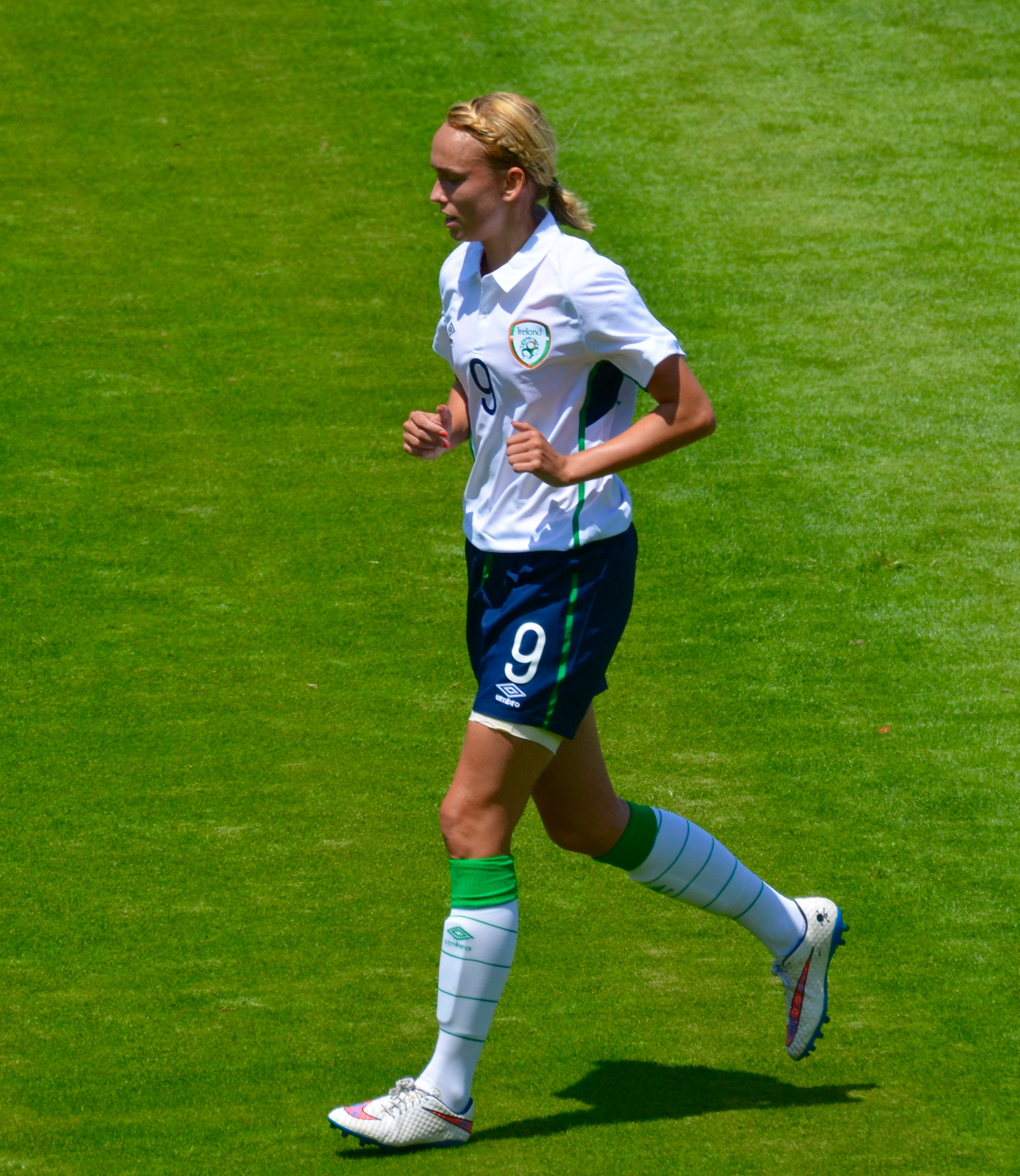
Republic of Ireland international, Stephanie Roche, the season's top goalscorer with 24 goals

Goals	Player	Club
24	Stephanie Roche	Peamount United
15	Sara Lawlor	Peamount United
13	Emma Mullin	Castlebar Celtic
8	Rebecca Creagh	Raheny United
8	Siobhán Killeen	Raheny United

== Team of the Season ==
No.	Pos.	Player	Date of birth (age)	Caps	Club
1	GK	Linda Meehan			Peamount United
2	DF	Seana Cooke			Raheny United
3	DF	Louise Quinn			Peamount United
4	DF	Emma Farmer			Cork Women's F.C.
5	DF	Nicola Dunphy			Wexford Youths
6	MF	Rebecca Creagh			Raheny United
7	MF	Denise O'Sullivan			Cork Women's F.C.
8	MF	Emma Hansberry			Castlebar Celtic
9	FW	Sara Lawlor			Peamount United
10	FW	Rachel Jenkins			Shamrock Rovers
11	FW	Stephanie Roche			Peamount United
