= Zahra (name) =

- Gender: Female

Origin
- Origin: Arabic
- Meaning: Flower, blossom; splendor, beauty; brightness

Other names
- Related names: Zahrah, Zehra, Sahra, Zara, Zarya, Zaira

Zahra (Arabic: زهراء) is a female given name and surname. It became popular as the name of Muhammad’s daughter, Fatimah al-Zahra.

The name was also popularized by Muslim influence in the Indian subcontinent. Zahra is also used as a surname, particularly in Malta.

It may be transliterated in several ways, including Zehra in Turkish, Zahra(h), Zara, Zuhra, Zahraa and Zohrah.

Its popularity in the Ottoman Empire made it common in countries like Albania, Kosovo and Bosnia and Herzegovina. It is popular among Bosniaks among whom it is written as Zehra. The form Zara has gained recent popularity in Bosnia and Herzegovina.

== Female given name ==
=== Zahra ===
- Zahra Abdulla (born 1966), Somali-Finnish politician
- Zahra Abrahimzadeh, mother of Arman Abrahimzadeh, murdered by her husband
  - Zahra Foundation, named after her
- Zahra Ahmadi (born 1983), British actress
- Zahra Airall, women's rights activist
- Zahra Alzubaidi, Iraqi film actress and musician
- Khalub Zahra, was the mother of the 10th-century caliph of Baghdad al-Muttaqi (r. 940–944).
- Zahra Amir Ebrahimi (born 1981), Iranian television actress
- Zahra Bahrami (c. 1965–2011), Dutch/Iranian executed for drug trafficking
- Zahra Baker, Australian murder victim
- Zahra Bani (born 1979), Somali-Italian javelin thrower
- Zahra Bani Yaghoub (1980–2007), an Iranian doctor who died in prison
- Zohra Bensalem (born 1990), Algerian volleyball player
- Zahra Dowlatabadi (born 1962), Iranian filmmaker
- Zahra Eshraghi (born c. 1964), Iranian feminist and human rights activist
- Zahra Freeth (1924 or 1925–2015), a British writer on Middle Eastern subjects
- Zahra Jishi, Lebanese-American translator of Arabic literature
- Zahra Kamalfar, Iranian refugee to Canada
- Zahra Kazemi (1949–2003), Iranian-Canadian freelance photographer
- Zahra Aga Khan (born 1970), Swiss-born princess
- Zahra Khanom Tadj es-Saltaneh (1883–1936), a Persian princess
- Zahra' Langhi, Libyan gender specialist, civil society strategist and political activist
- Zahra Lari, Emirati figure skater
- Zahra Mansouri, Moroccan poet
- Zahra Mostafavi Khomeini (born c. 1940), Iranian politician, daughter of Ayatollah Khomeini
- Zahra Muzdalifah (born 2001), Indonesian soccer player
- Zahra Rahmat Allah (born 1954), Yemeni short story writer
- Zahra Rahnavard (born 1945), Iranian artist and politician
- Zahra Ouaziz (born 1969), Moroccan long-distance runner
- Zahra Rahimi, Iranian para taekwondo practitioner
- Zahra Redwood, Jamaican beauty queen
- Zahra Yuriva Dermawan (born 2000), an Indonesian singer and former fourth-generation member of the idol group JKT48
- Zahra Shojaei, Iranian politician
- Zahra Universe, American musician and actress
- Zahra Hankir, Lebanese-British writer and journalist
- Zahra Mariam Bolkiah, Princess of Brunei

=== Zehra ===
==== Given name ====
- Ada Zehra Anlatıcı (born 2007), Turkish swimmer with Down syndrome
- Zehra Bilgin (born 2002), Turkish Olympian swimmer
- Zehra Bilir (1913–2007), Turkish folk singer
- Zehra Borazancı (born 1989), Turkish Cypriot women's footballer
- Zehra Çırak (born 1960), Turkish-German writer
- Zehra Demirhan (born 2001), Turkish sport wrestler
- Zehra Deović (1938–2015), Bosnian sevdalinka singer
- Zehra Erdem (born 2001), Turkish badminton player
- Zehra Fazal (born 1986), South Asian-American voice actresses
- Zehra Gemi (born 2009), Turkish darts player
- Zehra Güneş (born 1999), Turkish volleyball player
- Zehra Kaya (born 2004), Turkish karateka
- Zehra Khan (born 1983), American artist
- Zehra Nigah, Pakistani Urdu poet
- Zehra Öktem (born 1959), Turkish archer
- Zehra Say (1906–1990), Turkish painter
- Zehra Sayers (born 1953), Turkish scientist in structural biology
- Zehra Zümrüt Selçuk (born 1979), Turkish politician
- Zehra Topel (born 1987), Turkish international chess master

==== Middle name ====
- Belkıs Zehra Kaya (born 1984), Turkish judoka

=== Zahrah ===
- Zahrah Al Ghamdi, Saudi contemporary artist
- Zahrah Preble Hodge (1880–1934), American writer, performer
- Zahrah S. Khan (born 1992), British actress
- Zahrah al Kharji (born 1962), Kuwaiti actress
- Zahrah the Windseeker (2005), novel by Nnedi Okorafor

=== Other variant spellings of female given name ===
- Sahra Hausmann (born 1973), Norwegian team handball player
- Sahra Wagenknecht (born 1969), German politician (with Iranian father)
- Zohre Esmaeli (born 1985), Afghan model, designer and author
- Zuhra Ramdan Agha Al-Awji (active 1920s), Turkish-Libyan educator

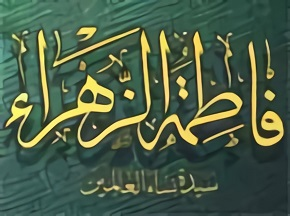
Arabic calligraphy reading Fatimah az-Zahra.

Fatimah was the daughter of the Islamic prophet, Muhammad, and is greatly revered by Muslims, often under the extended name Fatimah az-Zahra' , فاطمة الزهراء, or Fatimah Zahra' , فاطمة زهراء. This has then been used as a female given name.

- Fatima Al Zahraa Haider (born ca. 1910), an Egyptian princess
- Fatima Zahra Hafdi, known as La Zarra, Canadian-Moroccan singer
- Lalla Fatima Zohra (1929–2014), Moroccan princess
- Fatima-Zohra Imalayen, known as Assia Djebar (1936–2015), Algerian novelist, translator and filmmaker
- Fatima Zohra Karadja (born 1949), Algerian, Vice-President for the African Union's Economic, Social and Cultural Council for Northern Africa
- Fatma-Zohra Oukazi (born 1984), Algerian volleyball player
- Fatima Zahra Djouad (born 1988), Algerian volleyball player

== Male given name ==
- Zuhrah ibn Kilab, great-great-granduncle of Muhammad

== Surname ==
- Adrian Zahra (born 1990), Australian footballer
- Antoine Zahra (disambiguation), several people
- Brian K. Zahra (born ca. 1960), American judge
- Christian Zahra (born 1973), Maltese-Australian politician
- Francesco Zahra (1710–1773), Maltese painter
- Hindi Zahra (born 1979), Moroccan pop singer
- Julie Zahra (born 1982), Maltese singer
- Mark Zahra (born 1982), Australian jockey
- Muhammad Abu Zahra (1898–1974), Egyptian scholar of Islamic law and author
- Scott Zahra, Australian rugby league player
- Trevor Żahra (born 1947), Maltese novelist, poet and illustrator

== See also ==
- Abdul Zahra, Arabic male name
- Sarah (given name), female given name
- Zara (given name), female given name
- Zahra (disambiguation)
- Zerah, male given name occurring in the Hebrew Bible
- Zuhra (الزُهرة), the Arabic word for Venus
