= 2020 FAI Women's Cup final =

FA Cup Final

- Match programme cover
- Event: 2020 FAI Women's Cup
Cork City	Peamount United
0	6
- Date: 12 December 2020
- Venue: Tallaght Stadium, Dublin
- Player of the Match: Stephanie Roche (Peamount United)
- Referee: Claire Purcell (Waterford)
- Attendance: 0

The 2020 FAI Women's Cup final was the final match of the 2020 FAI Women's Cup, the national association football Cup of the Republic of Ireland. The match took place on 12 December 2020 at Tallaght Stadium in Dublin. Cork City and Peamount United contested the match.

The match was shown live on RTÉ2 and RTÉ2 HD in Ireland, and via the RTÉ Player worldwide with commentary from Ger Canning and Lisa Fallon. It was refereed by Claire Purcell, assisted by Ann Sweeney and Olivia Syned with Vickey McEnery as Fourth Official. The Reserve Official was Kate O'Brien.

League champions Peamount United won the Cup to claim a "double", avenge their defeats in the previous two finals and reclaim the trophy they won for the first time in 2010. Underdogs Cork City were unable to emulate their only previous win in 2017.

== Match ==
=== Summary ===
The match remained scoreless until half-time. On 46 minutes Stephanie Roche scored to give Peamount the lead, then scored again five minutes later. With 13 minutes of the match remaining, Roche made an assist to Áine O'Gorman who scored Peamount's third. As Cork City's young players tired, Peamount became increasingly dominant. Karen Duggan headed in O'Gorman's corner kick on 81 minutes, before substitutes Rebecca Watkins and Tiegan Ruddy added late goals to make the final score 6–0.

=== Details ===
12 December 2020
15:15 BST

Cork City	0–6	Peamount United
	Report	Roche 46', 52'; O'Gorman 76'; Duggan 81'; Watkins 84'; Ruddy 86'

Tallaght Stadium, Dublin
Attendance: 0
Referee: Claire Purcell (Waterford)

Cork	Peamount

GK	1	(Republic of Ireland) Maria O'Sullivan (c)
RB	2	(Republic of Ireland) Nathalie O'Brien	(substituted off) 82'
CB	3	(Republic of Ireland) Ciara McNamara	(substituted off) 82'
CB	6	(Republic of Ireland) Danielle Burke
LB	5	(Republic of Ireland) Zara Foley
DM	6	(Republic of Ireland) Éabha O'Mahony
DM	18	(Republic of Ireland) Becky Cassin
RM	10	(Republic of Ireland) Saoirse Noonan
CM	7	(Republic of Ireland) Christina Dring	(substituted off) 71'
LM	11	(Republic of Ireland) Sophie Liston	(substituted off) 82'
FW	19	(Republic of Ireland) Lauren Egbuloniu	(substituted off) 56'
Substitutions:
GK	13	(Republic of Ireland) Abby McCarthy
MF	8	(Republic of Ireland) Éadaoin Lyons
FW	9	(Republic of Ireland) Katie McCarthy	(substituted in) 56'
DF	14	(Republic of Ireland) Shaunagh McCarthy	(substituted in) 82'
FW	21	(Republic of Ireland) Nadine Seward	(substituted in) 82'
FW	23	(Republic of Ireland) Laura Shine	(substituted in) 71'
DF	24	(Republic of Ireland) Lauren Walsh	(substituted in) 82'
Manager:
(Republic of Ireland) Rónán Collins

GK	23	(Republic of Ireland) Niamh Reid Burke
RB	2	(Republic of Ireland) Lauryn O'Callaghan
CB	14	(Republic of Ireland) Claire Walsh
CB	8	(Republic of Ireland) Niamh Farrelly	(substituted off) 84'
LB	17	(Republic of Ireland) Dearbhaile Beirne	(substituted off) 78'
RM	7	(Republic of Ireland) Áine O'Gorman (c)
CM	16	(Republic of Ireland) Karen Duggan
CM	6	(Republic of Ireland) Lucy McCartan
LM	7	(Republic of Ireland) Alannah McEvoy	(substituted off) 69'
FW	10	(Republic of Ireland) Eleanor Ryan-Doyle	(substituted off) 78'
FW	25	(Republic of Ireland) Stephanie Roche	(substituted off) 84'
Substitutions:
GK	1	(Republic of Ireland) Naoisha McAloon
FW	7	(Republic of Ireland) Megan Smyth-Lynch	(substituted in) 69'
MF	13	(Republic of Ireland) Tiegan Ruddy	(substituted in) 84'
DF	18	(Republic of Ireland) Niamh Barnes
DF	19	(Republic of Ireland) Sabhdh Doyle	(substituted in) 78'
MF	21	(Republic of Ireland) Della Doherty	(substituted in) 84'
FW	22	(Republic of Ireland) Rebecca Watkins	(substituted in) 78'
Manager:
(Republic of Ireland) James O'Callaghan

Match officials

- Assistant referees:
  - Ann Sweeney
  - Olivia Syned
- Fourth official: Vickey McEnery

Match rules

- 90 minutes.
- 30 minutes of extra time if necessary.
- Penalty shoot-out if scores level.
- Seven substitutes named.
- Maximum of five substitutions.
