= 2019 FAI Women's Cup final =

FA Cup Final

- Event: 2019 FAI Women's Cup
Peamount United	Wexford Youths
2	3
- Date: 3 November 2019
- Venue: Aviva Stadium, Dublin
- Player of the Match: Lauren Kelly (Wexford Youths)
- Referee: Sarah Dyas (Louth)
- Attendance: 2,000

The 2019 FAI Women's Cup final, known as the 2019 Só Hotels FAI Women's Cup Final for sponsorship reasons, was the final match of the 2019 FAI Women's Cup, the national association football Cup of the Republic of Ireland. The match took place on 3 November 2019 at the Aviva Stadium in Dublin. Peamount United and Wexford Youths contested the match.

The match was shown live on RTÉ2 and RTÉ2 HD in Ireland, and via the RTÉ Player worldwide with commentary from Ger Canning and Lisa Fallon. It was refereed by Sarah Dyas, assisted by Michelle O'Neill and Katie Hall with Emma Cleary as Fourth Official.

Underdogs Wexford Youths won the Cup to retain the trophy they won for a second time in 2018. League champions Peamount United were unable to emulate their only previous Cup win in 2010 and were denied a "double".

== Match ==
=== Summary ===
Wexford Youths took the lead after three minutes, when Lauren Kelly dribbled through the Peamount defence and shot low past a surprised Niamh Reid Burke. Karen Duggan scored a long-range equaliser for Peamount on 32 minutes, only for Kelly to reinstate Wexford's lead two minutes later.

Seven minutes into the second half, Eleanor Ryan-Doyle brought the score back to 2–2 with another long range-goal from outside the penalty area. Wexford captain Kylie Murphy scored what proved to be the winning goal on 64 minutes, when she was assisted by Rianna Jarrett and curled a composed shot past Reid Burke from 12 yards (11m).

=== Details ===
3 November 2019
12:05 BST

Peamount United	2–3	Wexford Youths
Duggan 32'; Ryan-Doyle 52'	Report	Kelly 3', 34'; Murphy 64'

Aviva Stadium, Dublin
Attendance: 2,000
Referee: Sarah Dyas (Louth)

Peamount	Wexford

GK	23	(Republic of Ireland) Niamh Reid Burke
RB	2	(Republic of Ireland) Lauryn O'Callaghan	(substituted off) 68'
CB	14	(Republic of Ireland) Claire Walsh
CB	4	(Republic of Ireland) Louise Corrigan
LB	17	(Republic of Ireland) Dearbháile Beirne
DM	6	(Republic of Ireland) Lucy McCartan	(substituted off) 55'
DM	16	(Republic of Ireland) Karen Duggan
RW	7	(Republic of Ireland) Áine O'Gorman (c)
AM	8	(Republic of Ireland) Niamh Farrelly
LW	7	(Republic of Ireland) Megan Smyth-Lynch
FW	10	(Republic of Ireland) Eleanor Ryan-Doyle
Substitutions:
GK	1	(Republic of Ireland) Naoisha McAloon
FW	20	(Republic of Ireland) Naima Chemaou	(substituted in) 55'
DF	13	(Republic of Ireland) Niamh Barnes	(substituted in) 68'
MF	12	(Republic of Ireland) Louise Masterson
MF	5	(Republic of Ireland) Chloe Moloney
DF	3	(Republic of Ireland) Lauren Kealy
DF	22	(Republic of Ireland) Fiona Owens
Manager:
(Republic of Ireland) James O'Callaghan

GK	18	(Republic of Ireland) Ciamh Dolland
RB	11	(Republic of Ireland) Lynn Craven	(yellow card) 90+1'
CB	16	(Republic of Ireland) Nicola Sinnott
CB	5	(Republic of Ireland) Lauren Dwyer
LB	3	(Republic of Ireland) Orlaith Conlan
RM	15	(Republic of Ireland) Aisling Frawley		(substituted off) 86'
CM	6	(Republic of Ireland) Kylie Murphy (c)
CM	8	(Republic of Ireland) Edel Kennedy
LM	12	(Republic of Ireland) Ciara Rossiter		(substituted off) 61'
FW	9	(Republic of Ireland) Lauren Kelly
FW	19	(Republic of Ireland) Rianna Jarrett
Substitutions:
GK	21	(Republic of Ireland) Maeve Williams
MF	4	(Republic of Ireland) Aoife Slattery
FW	14	(Republic of Ireland) Vanessa Ogbonna
MF	7	(Republic of Ireland) Becky Cassin
DF	10	(United States) McKenna Davidson		(substituted in) 61'
MF	17	(Republic of Ireland) Fiona Ryan
MF	23	(Republic of Ireland) Blessing Kingsley		(substituted in) 86'
Manager:
(England) Tom Elmes

Match officials

- Assistant referees:
  - Michelle O'Neill
  - Katie Hall
- Fourth official: Emma Cleary

Match rules

- 90 minutes.
- 30 minutes of extra time if necessary.
- Penalty shoot-out if scores level.
- Seven substitutes named.
- Maximum of five substitutions.
