= Zara (name) =

Female given name

- Gender: Female

Origin
- Meaning: splendor, beauty; brightness, radiance

Other names
- Variant forms: Zarah, Sarah, Sara

Zara is a feminine given name and a surname.

Zara is commonly cited as a Hebrew name and considered a variant of the Hebrew name Sarah or a feminine form of Zarah, better known as Zerah, a biblical figure from the Book of Genesis. The connection between Zara and Zarah is not well-supported by evidence.

Another theory suggests that Zara is an Arabic version of Zahra, meaning "flower" or "radiant."

Other interpretations say that it is the English form of the name Zaïre, the central character of Voltaire's 1732 play Zaïre (The Tragedy of Zara). Another derivation, unrelated to the above, is the Bulgarian name Zara (Зара) which is a diminutive of Zaharina or Zaharinka. Its popularity may have also been influenced by the naming of Princess Anne's daughter Zara Phillips in 1981, and the Spanish fashion store Zara.

In the Balkans, Zara is popular in Bosnia and Herzegovina and Albania. It is especially popular among Bosniaks in the former Yugoslav nations. The name is a modification to the name Zahra, which is written as Zehra in the region (one of the most famous bearers being Zehra Deović) and it holds the same meanings of flower, blossom; splendor, beauty; brightness, radiance.

== Given name ==
- Zara Noor Abbas (a.k.a. Zara Noor Siddiqui; born 1990), Pakistani actress
- Zara Abid (1992–2020), Pakistani model
- Zara Alvarez (1981–2020), Filipina social activist
- Zara Aramyan (1970–2026), Armenian TV and radio host
- Zara Aronson (1864–1944), Sydney-based journalist
- Zara Backman (1875–1949), Swedish actress
- Dame Zara Bate (1909–1989), Australian fashion designer, wife of Harold Holt
- Zara Bolton (1914–1994), Irish golfer
- Zara Cully (1892–1978), American actress
- Zara Salim Davidson (born 1973), Malaysian royal
- Zara Dampney (born 1986), British volleyball player
- Zara Davis (born 1966), English windsurfer
- Zara Dawson (born 1983), English actress and television presenter
- Zara Dolukhanova (1918–2007), Armenian mezzo-soprano singer
- Zara DuPont (1869–1946), American suffragist
- Zara Foley (born 2002), Irish footballer
- Zara Glover (born 1982), English ten-pin bowler
- Zara Holland, British television personality
- Zara Hore-Ruthven, Countess of Gowrie (1879–1965), Anglo-Irish wife of the Earl of Gowrie, Governor-General of Australia
- Zara Kay (born 1992), secular activist
- Zara Larsson (born 1997), Swedish singer
- Zara Leghissa (born 1970), Swedish politician
- Zara Levina (1906–1976), Ukrainian pianist and composer
- Zara Long (born 1970), British swimmer
- Zara McDermott (born 1996), British media personality
- Zara McFarlane (born 1983), British musician
- Zara Mints (1927–1990), Russian-Estonian literary scientist, wife of Yuri Lotman
- Zara Mohammed (born c.1991), Scottish faith leader
- Zara Mullooly (born 2002), British Paralympic swimmer
- Zara Nakhimovskaya (born 1934), Latvian chess player
- Zara Nelsova (1918–2002), Canadian cellist
- Zara Northover (born 1984), Jamaican shot putter
- Zara Nutley (1926–2016), British television actress
- Zara Peerzada (born 1992), Pakistani model
- Zara Rahim, American communications strategist and political adviser
- Zara Rutherford (born 2002), Belgian-British aviator
- Zara Schmelen (c.1793–1831), Southern African translator
- Zara Sheikh (born 1982), Pakistani model and Lollywood actress
- Zara Steiner (1928–2020), American-born British historian and academic
- Zara Tindall (née Phillips; born 1981), daughter of Princess Anne of the United Kingdom
- Zara Turner (born ca. 1968), British actress
- Zara Whites (born 1968), Dutch television personality, activist and former pornographic actress
- Zara A. Wilson (1840–?), American reformer and lawyer
- Zara Wright (active 1920), American author based in Chicago
- Zara Yaqob (1399–1468), Emperor of Ethiopia (1434–1468)
- Zaara Yesmin (born 1997), Indian actress
- Zara Zarib, Bangladeshi actor

=== Surname ===
- Adhisty Zara (born 2003), Indonesian singer
- Alberto da Zara (1889–1951), Italian admiral
- Antonio Zara (died 1621), Roman Catholic prelate
- Bert Zara (active 1969–1975), Australian rugby league player
- Christopher Zara (born 1970), American writer
- Gregorio Y. Zara (1902–1978), Filipino engineer and physicist
- Zdeněk Žára (1932–2002), Czechoslovak rower

== Fictional characters ==
- Zara (character), a DC Comics supervillain
- Zara, the antagonist of the 2007 video game Disney Princess: Enchanted Journey
- Zara Amaro, daughter of Detective Nick Amaro in the TV series Law and Order: Special Victims Unit
- Zara Asker, head of CHERUB in the teenage spy novels by Robert Muchamore
- Zara, in the Australian preschool animated show Bluey
- Zara Carmichael in TV series Doctors
- Zara Dearborn, antagonist in Queen of Air and Darkness, novel by Cassandra Clare
- Zara Morgan in TV series Hollyoaks
- Zara the Starlight Fairy, a character from the Rainbow Magic book franchise

== See also ==
- Zahra (name)
- Zara (disambiguation)
