= Naoisha McAloon =

Irish association football player

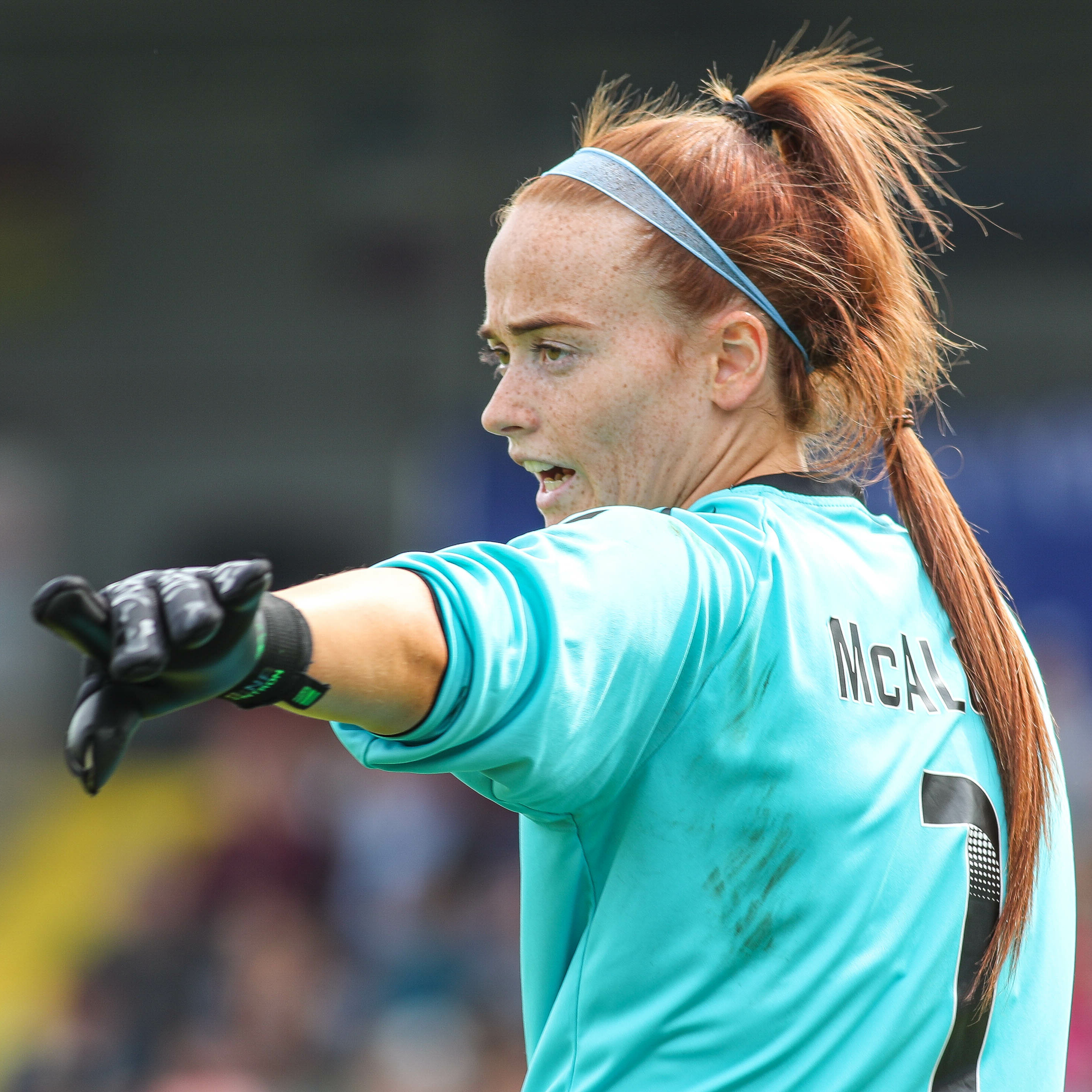
- McAloon with Durham in 2023

Personal information
- Date of birth: 17 March 1999 (age 27)
- Place of birth: Dublin, Ireland
- Position: Goalkeeper

Team information
- Current team: Liverpool Feds (on loan from Burnley

Youth career
- Castlenock Celtic
- Peamount United

Senior career*
Years	Team	Apps	(Gls)
2016–2022	Peamount United		
2022–2024	Durham	51	(0)
2024–	Burnley	0	(0)
2026–	→ Liverpool Feds (loan)	0	(0)

International career^{‡}
2022–	Ireland	0	(0)
- * Club domestic league appearances and goals as of 11:48, 4 August 2026 (UTC) ‡ National team caps and goals as of 13:07, 10 January 2023 (UTC)

Naoisha McAloon (born 17 March 1999) is an Irish footballer who currently plays as a goalkeeper for Women's National League North side Liverpool Feds, on loan from Women's Super League 2 club Burnley, and for the Republic of Ireland national team.

== Club career ==
=== Early career ===
McAloon played for Castleknock Celtic at youth level and attended Matt Gregg's Just4Keepers coaching school in Blanchardstown.

=== Peamount United ===
McAloon played for Peamount United from 2016 to 2022. In 2017, her team won second place after a defeat by Shelbourne in the National League Cup. In 2018, her team won against Wexford Youths to win the WNL Cup title.

Peamount signed Niamh Reid Burke in 2018 and she shared the club's goalkeeping position with McAloon thereafter. The club were Women's National League Champions in 2019 and McAloon was named in the WNL Team of the Season, although Reid Burke played in the decisive 8–1 win over Cork City and the 2019 FAI Cup final defeat by Wexford Youths.

The duo continued to rotate the starting goalkeeping position as Peamount United secured a League and Cup "double" in their 2020 campaign. Reid Burke was preferred as Peamount beat Cork City 6–0 in the 2020 FAI Women's Cup Final and for November's UEFA Champions League fixture with Scottish Women's Premier League club Glasgow City, which was lost on penalties after a 0–0 draw.

In 2021, the goalkeeper rotation continued, with McAloon chosen to start the 5–2 UWCL defeat by ŽFK Spartak Subotica in August 2021.

=== Durham ===
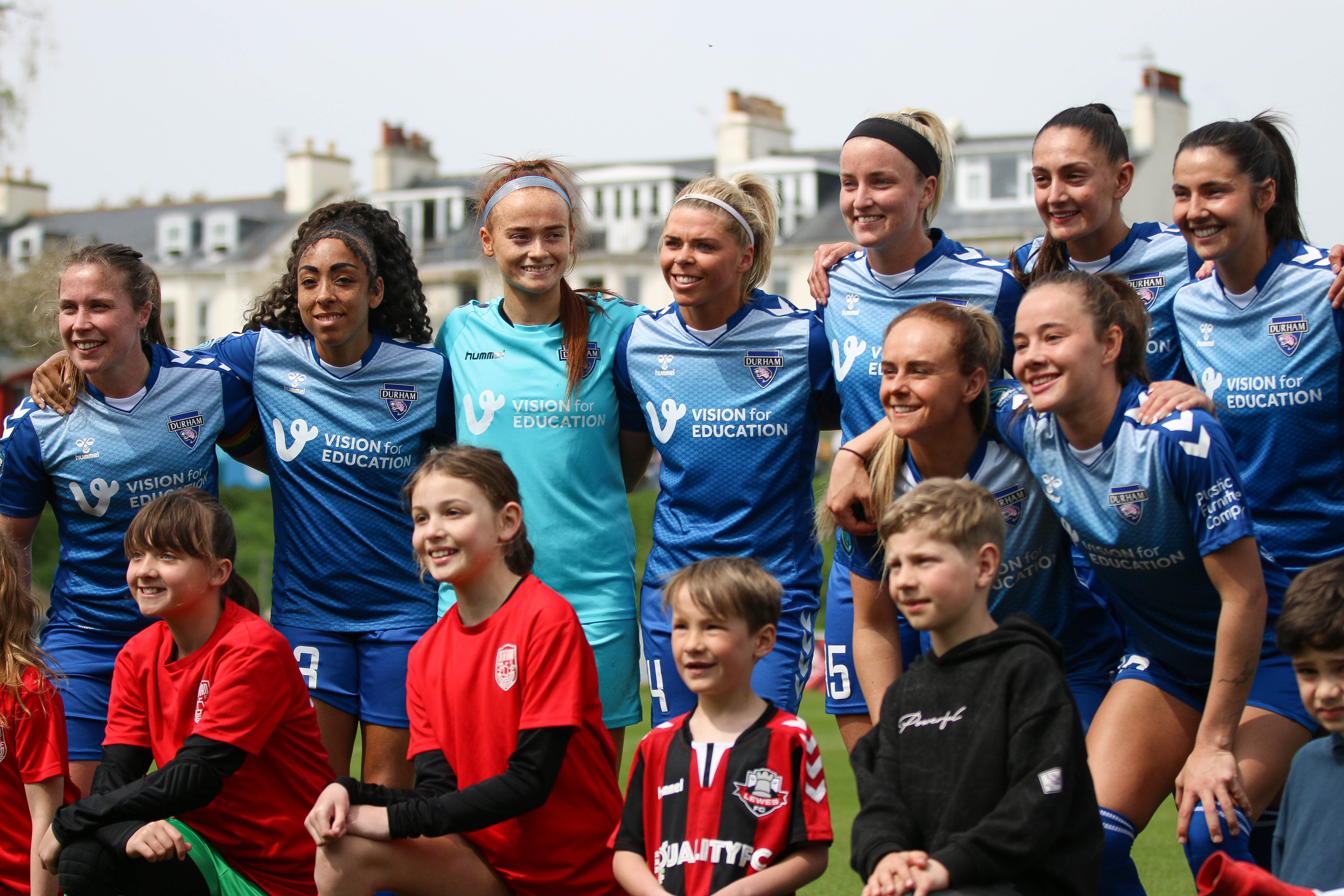
McAloon and teammates at Lewes WFC in 2023

In January 2022, McAloon switched to Durham. In October 2022, she made two saves as Durham upset Super League club Manchester United on a penalty shootout in the 2022–23 FA Women's League Cup.

=== Burnley ===
Following the expiration of her contract with Durham in July 2024, McAloon joined Burnley in the National League Northern Premier Division.

==== Loan to Liverpool Feds ====
In August 2026, it was announced that McAloon would join Liverpool Feds on a season-long loan.

== International career ==
=== Junior ===
McAloon represented Ireland at youth level while she attended Ratoath College. She progressed to represent the Republic of Ireland national under-17 team and later the Republic of Ireland national under-19 team.

While enrolled at Technological University Dublin, McAloon was part of the Ireland Universities squad at the 2019 Summer Universiade.

=== Senior ===
She received her first call-up to the senior Irish national team in June 2022.
