= Langhi =

Langhi is a surname. Notable people with the surname include:

- Dan Langhi (born 1977), American basketball player
- Michael Langhi (born 1985), Brazilian martial artist
- Zahra' Langhi, Libyan gender specialist, civil society strategist, and political activist

== See also ==
- Langhian
