= Sharda University =

Private university in Uttar Pradesh, India

- Type: Private
- Established: 2009; 17 years ago
- Affiliations: UGC
- Chancellor: Pradeep Kumar Gupta
- Vice-Chancellor: Dr. Sibaram Khara
- Faculty: 1,200+
- Students: 17000+
- Location: Greater Noida, Uttar Pradesh, India; 28°28′21″N 77°29′00″E
- Campus: Urban (68 acres)
- Website: www.sharda.ac.in

Sharda University is a private university in Uttar Pradesh, established in 2009 under the Uttar Pradesh State Legislature Act No.14 of 2009 and is recognized by the University Grants Commission under Section 2(f) with the right to confer degrees as per Section 22(1) of the UGC Act,1956. It is part of the Sharda Group of Institutions founded by Pradeep Kumar Gupta and Yatendra Kumar Gupta. The university also has sister branches in Agra and Uzbekistan.

Located in Greater Noida, the campus is spread over 63 acres.

== History ==
Sharda University traces its origins to the establishment of the Sharda Group in 1996. Sharda University was formally established in the year 2009.

The university has expanded its reach through a variety of initiatives, such as the establishment of Sharda Hospital, which contributes to healthcare education and services, and Sharda University campuses in Uzbekistan and Agra, broadening the university’s international and national footprint. In addition, Sharda World School and Sharda Care Healthcity were launched recently to integrate primary education and advanced healthcare in the Sharda Group.

== Academics ==
Sharda University offers 135+ UG, PG, Diploma, and Ph.D. programmes in 12 Disciplines. Sharda University’s Undergraduate courses include B.Tech, BCA, B.Sc. (IT & CS), BBA, B.com Hons, B.com, B.Pharma, B.Sc, B.Sc. Hons, BPT, B.O., BDS, B.A., B.A. Hons., BA- LLB, BBA-LLB, B.Sc. Nursing, Bachelor of Architecture, B.Des, BVA, BJMC, BA Film & OTT Production, BSC Animation & VFX, and MBBS. The postgraduate courses include M.Tech, MBA, MCA, M.Com, MJMC, LLM, M.Sc., M.Sc. Nursing, M.Des, MPT, M.Pharm, MDS, and M.D.

In 2024, 11 Faculty Members from the university were named among the top 2% of scientists worldwide by Stanford University.

Careers360 has also highlighted the recognition received by several Sharda University faculty members who were listed among the top 2% of scientists worldwide in 2024.

== Schools at Sharda University ==
- Sharda School of Engineering & Technology
- Sharda School of Business Studies
- Sharda School of Basic Sciences & Research
- Sharda School of Allied Health Sciences
- Sharda School of Humanities and Social Sciences S
- Sharda School of Design, Architecture & Planning S
- Sharda School of Media, Film and Entertainment
- Sharda School of Nursing Science & Research
- Sharda School of Law
- Sharda School of Dental Sciences
- Sharda School of Medical Sciences & Research
- Sharda School of Pharmacy
- Sharda School of Education
- Sharda School of Agricultural Sciences

== Rankings ==
Sharda University holds the NAAC A+ accreditation and was ranked 86th in India by NIRF in 2024. Furthermore, a select few of Sharda University's Engineering programs have received accreditation from the NBA (National Board of Accreditation). Sharda University was ranked 3rd in North India by Times Engineering for its engineering programs. Sharda School of Pharmacy was ranked 68th in India by the NIRF in the pharmacy ranking in 2024. Sharda School of Dental Sciences was ranked 18th in Outlook-ICARE Rankings of top 20 private dental college for 2024. Sharda University also ranks 32nd for Affordable and Clean Energy by Times Higher Education.

EducationWorld has featured Sharda University in its institutional listings, noting its academic facilities and multidisciplinary programs.

Sharda University is also profiled on QS TopUniversities, reflecting its participation in global higher education evaluations.

Times Higher Education includes Sharda University in its World University Impact Rankings for Affordable and Clean Energy, placing it among institutions contributing to the United Nations Sustainable Development Goals.

Sharda University has also been evaluated under the QS I-GAUGE rating system, which assesses Indian higher education institutions based on teaching, learning, facilities, and employability indicators.

== Notable alumni ==
1. Diwakar Viash, head of Robotics and Research at A-SET Training and Research Institutes and developer of India's first completely indigenous 3D printed humanoid robot (Manav).
2. Zaara Yesmin- actress & model, Winner of Femina Style Diva East and received ‘Powerful Women of the Year 2022’ by Governor Bhagat Singh Koshyari at Raj Bhavan Mumbai on International Women’s Day

University rankings

Pharmacy – India
- NIRF (2024): 69
