= 1962 in Kuwait =

- Decades: 1940s; 1950s; 1960s; 1970s; 1980s
- See also: Other events of 1962; List of years in Kuwait; Timeline of Kuwaiti history

Events from the year 1962 in Kuwait.

== Incumbents ==
- Emir: Abdullah Al-Salim Al-Sabah
- Prime Minister: Abdullah Al-Salim Al-Sabah (starting 17 January)

== Events ==
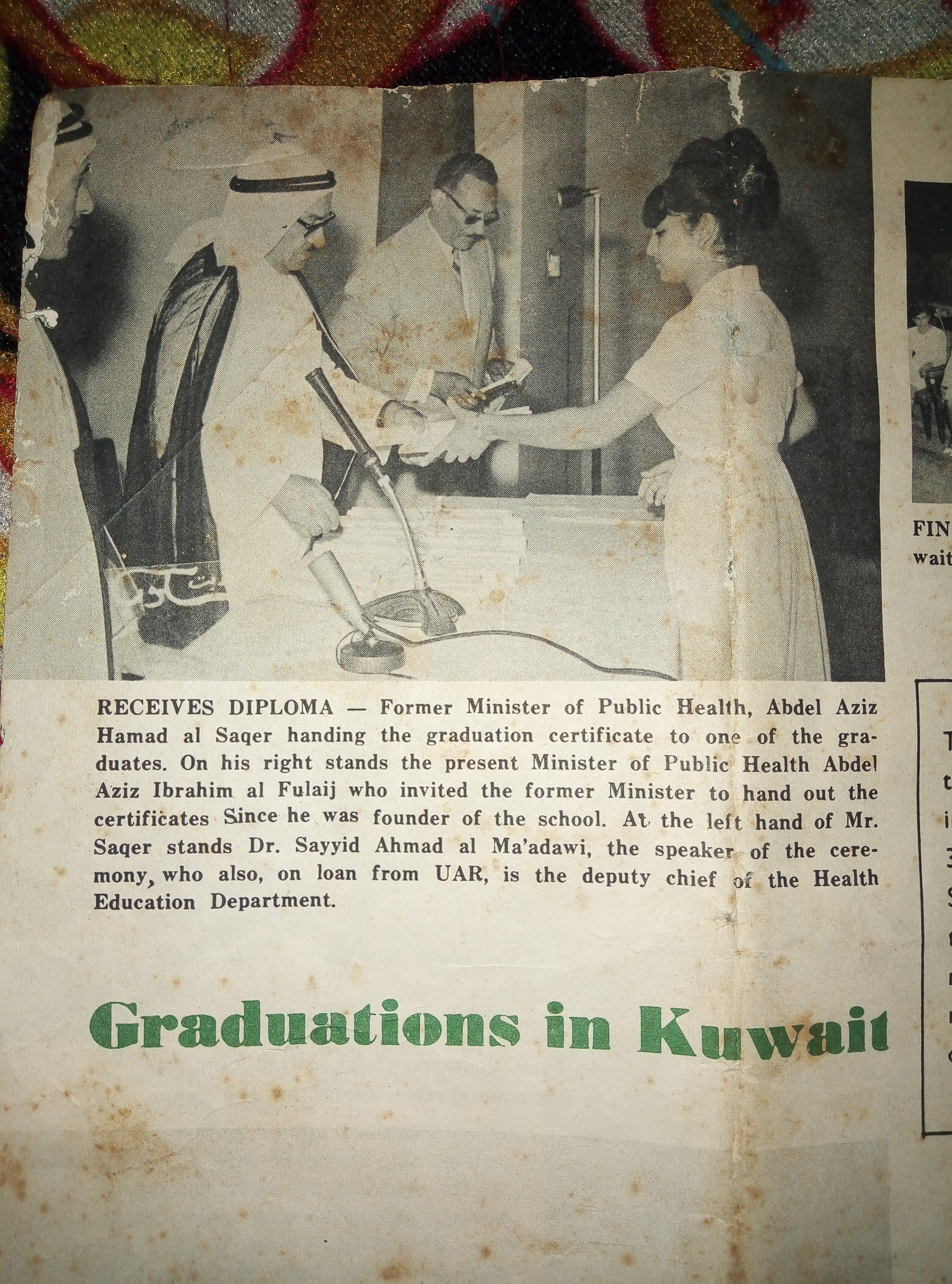

Former Minister of Public Health, Abdel Aziz Hamad alsaqer handing the graduation certificate to one of the graduates . with the minister of Public Health Abdel Aziz Ibrahim al Fulaij who invited the former minister to hand out the certificates since he was the founder of the Nursing school in Kuwait and beside MR. Saqer stands Dr. Sayyid Ahmad al Ma'dawi, the speaker of the ceremony, who also, on loan from A.R.E, is the deputy chief of the Health Education Department.

== Births ==
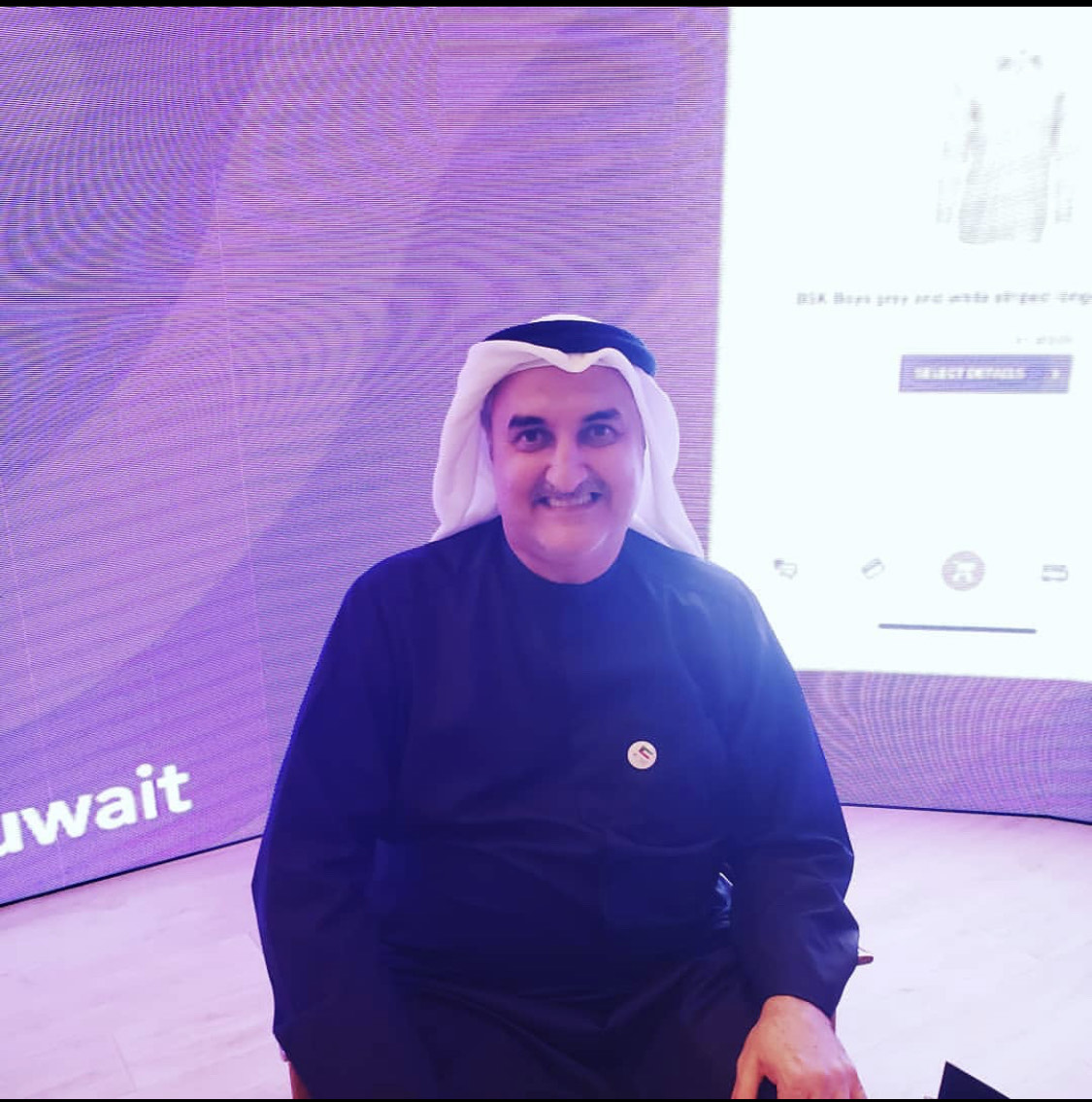
Kifah Al-Mutawa

- 15 January - Zahrah al Kharji, Kuwaiti actress.
- 11 July - Ahmed Al-Ahmed, fencer.
- 28 October - Kifah Al-Mutawa fencer.
- 4 December - Abdulaziz Al-Buloushi, footballer.
