= Abdolreza =

Abdolreza (also transliterated as Abdulredha, Abdulreza, or Abd ol-Reza, Arabic: عبد الرضا, Persian: عبدالرضا) is a masculine Arabic given name composed of Abdol and Reza, meaning servant of the contented. It is especially popular in Iran. It is commonly associated with Twelver Shi'ites, who especially revere their 8th Imam, Ali al-Ridha. The name is forbidden for Sunnis, who may not use any names implying servitude to anything besides God. It may refer to:

== People ==
- Abdolreza Ansari (1925–2020), Iranian politician
- Abdolreza Barzegari (born 1958), Iranian footballer
- Abdulredha Buhmaid (1982–2011), Bahraini victim of Death of Abdulredha Buhmaid
- Abdolreza Ghanbari (born c. 1968), imprisoned Iranian university lecturer
- Abdolreza Jokar, Iranian Paralympic athlete
- Abdolreza Kahani (born 1973), Iranian filmmaker
- Abdolreza Mesri (born 1956), Iranian politician
- Abdul Reza Pahlavi (1924–2004), Iranian prince, son of Rezā Shāh
- Abdolreza Rahmani Fazli (born 1959), Iranian politician
- Abdolreza Rajabi (1962–2008), Kurdish Iranian political activist who died in custody

== See also ==
- Abdul Hussein
- Abdul Zahra
