= Royal Museum (disambiguation) =

Royal Museum is a common name for official state museums in countries with a monarchy, or which formerly had one. Royal Museum may refer to:

== Belgium ==
- Royal Museum of the Armed Forces and of Military History, Brussels
- Royal Museum for Central Africa, Tervuren
- Royal Museum of Fine Arts, Antwerp
- Royal Museums of Fine Arts of Belgium, Brussels

== Canada ==
In Canada the official history and natural history museums of many of the provinces carry the designation "Royal":

- Royal Alberta Museum, the provincial museum of Alberta, located in Edmonton
- Royal British Columbia Museum, the provincial museum of British Columbia, located in Victoria
- Royal Ontario Museum, the provincial museum of Ontario, located in Toronto
- Royal Saskatchewan Museum, the provincial museum of Saskatchewan, located in Regina
- Royal Tyrrell Museum of Palaeontology, Drumheller, Alberta

== United Kingdom ==
- Royal Museum, Edinburgh, Scotland
- Firepower - The Royal Artillery Museum, Woowich, London, England
- Royal Air Force Museum, London and Cosford, England
- Royal Engineers Museum, Gillingham, England
- Royal Navy Submarine Museum, Gosport, England
- Royal Naval Museum, Portsmouth, England
- Royal Marines Museum, Portsmouth, England
- Royal Green Jackets (Rifles) Museum, Winchester, England
- Royal Cornwall Museum, Truro, England
- Royal Armouries Museum, Leeds, England
- Royal Albert Memorial Museum, Exeter, England
- Royal Museum and Art Gallery, Canterbury, England

== Other ==
- Istana Negara, Jalan Istana, a former royal palace in Malaysia, now houses the Royal Museum since 2013.
- Royal Jewelry Museum, Alexandria, Egypt
- Royal Museum (Berlin), known since 1845 as the Altes Museum
- Royal Regalia Museum, Brunei

== See also ==
- national museum
- provincial museum
- Rijksmuseum
