= Zaia (surname) =

Zaia is an Italian surname. Notable people with the surname include:

- Luca Zaia (born 1968), Italian politician
- Meelis Zaia (born 1956), Assyrian Metropolitan

== See also ==
- Zara (name)
