= Abd al-Zahra =

Abd al-Zahra (Arabic: عبد الزهرة) is a male Arabic given name. The name is built from the Arabic words Abd, al- and Zahra, and means Servant of Zahra. It is commonly associated with Shi'ites, who especially revere Fatimah Zahra. The name is considered taboo, if not outright forbidden for Sunnis, who may not use any names implying servitude to anything besides God. It may refer to:

- Abdelzahra Othman Mohammed, alternate name of Ezzedine Salim (1943–2004), Iraqi politician
- Dia Abdul Zahra Kadim (ca. 1970–2007), Iraqi politico-religious activist
- Alaa Abdul-Zahra (born 1985), Iraqi footballer
- Ali Abdul Zahra (born 1953), Iraqi footballer
- Nazar Abdul Zahra (1961–2006), Iraqi footballer
- Mohammed Abdul-Zahra (born 1989), Iraqi footballer

== See also ==
- Abdolreza
- Abdul Hussein
- Zahra (name)
