= Abdul Hussein =

Abdul Hussein (Arabic: عبد الحسين, Persian: عبدالحسین) (also transliterated as Abd al-Husayn, Abdolhossein, or Abdul Husayn) is a Muslim male given name, the name is built from the Arabic words Abd, al- and Hussein, and means Servant of Hussein. It is commonly associated with Shi'ites, who especially revere Hussein ibn Ali. The name is taboo for Sunnis, who may not use any names implying servitude to anything besides God. It may refer to:

== Full name ==
- Abdul Hussein (fighter) (born 1997), Finnish-Palestinian mixed martial artist

== Given name ==
- Abdul Hosein Amini
- Abdulhussain Abdulredha (1939–2017), Kuwaiti actor
- Abdolhossein Behnia, Iranian politician
- Abdol-Hossein Farmanfarma (1859–1939), Qajar prince
- Abdolhossein Hazhir (1899–1949), Iranian politician
- Abdol Hossein Hejazi (1904–1969), Iranian military officer
- Abdul Husain Husamuddin (1823–1891), Indian, Da'i al-Mutlaq of Dawoodi Bohra sect
- Abdolhossein Moezi (born 1945), Iranian scholar
- Abdolhossein Mokhtabad (born 1966), Iranian composer
- Abd al-Husayn Sharaf al-Din al-Musawi (1290–1377), Shi'a twelver Islamic scholar
- Abdol Hossein Sardari (1895–1981), Iranian statesman
- Abdolhossein Sepanta (1907–1969), Iranian film director
- Abdolhossein Teymourtash (1883–1933), Iranian politician
- Abdolhossein Zarrinkoob (1923–1999), Iranian literary scholar

== Middle name ==
- Abdulaziz Abdulhussein Sachedina, Tanzanian-born professor
- Ammar Abdul-Hussein Al-Asadi (born 1993), Iraqi footballer

== Surname ==
- Alaa Abdul-Hussein (born 1986), Iraqi footballer

== See also ==
- Abdolreza
- Abdul Zahra
