= 1961 in Kuwait =

- Decades: 1940s; 1950s; 1960s; 1970s; 1980s
- See also: Other events of 1961; List of years in Kuwait; Timeline of Kuwaiti history

The following lists events that happened during 1961 in the State of Kuwait.

== Incumbents ==
- Emir: Abdullah Al-Salim Al-Sabah

== Events ==
- Kuwaiti Premier League was formed.

== Births ==
- 18 July - Abdallah Al Rowaished, singer

== See also ==
- Years in Jordan
- Years in Syria
