= Antoine Zahra =

Antoine Zahra may refer to:

- Antoine Zahra (legislator) (born 1956), Lebanese Maronite political figure
- Antoine Zahra (footballer born 1977), Maltese midfielder
- Antoine Zahra (footballer born 1981), Maltese striker

== See also ==
- Zahra (disambiguation)
- Zahra (name)
- Zahra (family name)
