= Home-Based Women Worker's Federation =

Pakistani trade union of home-based female workers

HBWWF
- Home-Based Women Worker's Federation
- Founded: 2009
- Location: Pakistan
- Members: 4,500
- Key people: Zehra Khan, General Secretary
- Affiliations: WFTU, IndustriALL Global Union Clean Cloth Campaign, Home Net International
- Website: hbwwf.org

The Home-Based Women Worker's Federation (HBWWF) is a trade union federation of home-based female workers in Pakistan. It is the first-ever all-women-run trade union for informal workers in the country. The Federations focus is on addressing class struggles and the economic exploitation of workers.

In December 2009, HBWWF was officially registered with the National Industrial Relations Commission (NIRC) following the registration of three unions in the embroidery and glass bangle industries. Federation members are involved in various sectors, including textile and garment manufacturing, shoemaking, toy and sports goods production, glass bangle making, traditional embroidery, zardozi, stitching, cropping, jewellery making, ralli work, hanger making, auto parts manufacturing, and agriculture.

HBWWF is working on four levels:

- Awareness raising on the issues
- Unionisation/organisation
- Legislation for home-based women workers
- Skill and capacity building training

== History ==
In 2005, study circles were established in various places including Karachi, Hyderabad, Hub, and Quetta to address the challenges faced by informal female workers. In 2006, cooperatives were established in Karachi for garment, textile, and embroidery workers, and in Hyderabad for glass bangle workers. By September 2009, unions had been established in the traditional embroidery sectors. By November 2009, workers, particularly in the glass bangle industry, began organizing more effectively. On 30 December 2009, the Home-Based Women Workers Federation was established, with Zehra Akbar Kahn becoming its inaugural secretary-general. By 2016, the Federation registered its fourth union of home-based women workers garment and textile workers with the Labour Department in Karachi.

In May 2018, a significant milestone for labor rights was achieved with the enactment of the Home-Based Workers Act in Sindh. This act officially recognized home-based workers as part of the province's labor force, enabling the imposition of responsibilities on contractors and providing protections for those involved in home-based industries. Sindh became therefore the first region in South Asia to implement legal protections for home-based workers.

== Organisation & affiliates ==
The federation organises meetings for awareness and also trainings in skills like Henna art, embroidery etc. Study circles often involve discussions on social and economic issues as well as laws for citizens. The Federation also working for the access of home-based women workers with the old age benefits and worker welfare programs.

HBWWF itself if affiliated with many organizations at the local and international levels. Internationally, it is affiliated with the World Federation of Trade Unions, the IndustriALL Global Union.
