= Zara Foley =

Republic of Ireland footballer

Personal information
- Full name: Zara Foley
- Date of birth: 11 April 2002 (age 24)
- Place of birth: Ireland
- Position: Defender

Youth career
- Lakewood AFC

Senior career*
Years	Team	Apps	(Gls)
2018−2023	Cork City	63	(1)

International career^{‡}
2018	Republic of Ireland U17	4	(0)
2019−2023	Republic of Ireland U19	2	(0)
2018−2023	Republic of Ireland	1	(0)
- * Club domestic league appearances and goals ‡ National team caps and goals as of 22:42, 23 January 2021 (UTC)

Zara Foley (born 11 April 2002) is an Irish former professional footballer who played for Women's National League team Cork City, and the Republic of Ireland women's national football team, as a defender.

== Club career ==
Foley joined Cork City from Lakewood Athletic in July 2018. She made her debut for Cork City in a 3−1 defeat against Wexford Youths. In the 2019 season she scored her first goal in a 7−1 win against Kilkenny United, scoring in the third minute. In the 2020 season she played a pivotal role in guiding Cork to 4th place. They also reached the 2020 FAI Women's Cup Final, where they were defeated 6−0 by Peamount United.

On 14 September 2023 her club announced that Foley would be retiring from football due to an injury that would make it impossible for her to reach full capacity again.

== International career ==
Foley was called up to the Irish senior women's squad for two friendlies against Portugal in January 2018. She was an unused substitute in a 1−0 loss.

She was again called up to the senior squad in June of that year, and was again an unused substitute in a 1−0 loss to Norway, in their 2019 World Cup qualification match. She would go on to make her debut against Poland in October, coming on as a 90th-minute substitute for Ruesha Littlejohn. In 2018 Foley was called up for four Under-17 European Championship qualification matches for the Ireland U17 team. In 2019 she played for the U19 team in a 2020 Under-19 European Championship qualification match against Netherlands, she played all 90 minutes in a 6−0 loss.

== Personal life ==
Foley is from Ballincollig. Her older brother Dylan played soccer for Cork City and Cobh Ramblers.
