= 2020 FAI Women's Cup =

Tournament details
- Country: Ireland
- Venue(s): Tallaght Stadium, Dublin
- Dates: 19 September 2020 – 12 December 2020
- Teams: 9

Final positions
- Champions: Peamount United (2nd title)
- Runners-up: Cork City

Tournament statistics
- Matches played: 8
- Goals scored: 23 (2.88 per match)
- Top goal scorer(s): Saoirse Noonan (2 goals); Stephanie Roche (2 goals)

The 2020 FAI Women's Cup is the 45th edition of the Republic of Ireland's primary national cup competition for women's association football teams. This edition features clubs exclusively from the Women's National League (WNL), whereas usually non-league teams are involved. The number of teams was reduced due to the Coronavirus pandemic. The restrictions also meant that crowds were restricted or prohibited from attending. The competition began on 19 September 2020 with a preliminary round and concluded on 12 December 2020. The final was moved to the Tallaght Stadium from the Aviva Stadium in Dublin, which had hosted the previous seven finals.

The WNL Cup was deferred for the season, but the 2020 FAI Women's Cup was effectively a League Cup, with the nine Women's National League clubs the only participants. Peamount United won the cup on 12 December, beating Cork City in the final.

The Cup holders were Wexford Youths, who defeated Peamount United in both the 2018 and 2019 finals.

== Preliminary round ==
The draw for the quarter-final took place on 29 July 2020. Women's National League (WNL) expansion teams Athlone Town and Bohemians were selected to play in a single match preliminary round, the winner of which was to join the other seven WNL clubs in the quarter-finals.

Teams in bold advanced to the quarter-final.

Preliminary
- Athlone Town
- **Bohemians**
- **Cork City**^{[Bye]}
- **DLR Waves**^{[Bye]}
- **Galway**^{[Bye]}
- **Peamount United**^{[Bye]}
- **Shelbourne**^{[Bye]}
- **Treaty United**^{[Bye]}
- **Wexford Youths**^{[Bye]}

19 September 2020	Athlone Town	**1–1** (a.e.t.) (**2–4** p)	**Bohemians**	Lissywollen
19:00 GMT	Kellie Brennan 45+3' (pen.)	Report	Sophie Watters 61'	Stadium: Athlone Town Stadium; Attendance: N/A
	**Penalties**
	Zara Lawless (penalty scored); Emma Donohoe (penalty scored); Paula Doran (penalty missed); Kellie Brennan (penalty missed)		(penalty scored) Rebecca Creagh; (penalty scored) Ally Cahill; (penalty scored) Sinead O'Farrelly; (penalty scored) Chloe Flynn

== Quarter-finals ==
Teams in bold advanced to the semi-finals.

Quarter-final
- Bohemians
- **Cork City**
- DLR Waves
- Galway
- **Peamount United**
- Shelbourne
- **Treaty United**
- **Wexford Youths**

3 October 2020	Bohemians	**1–3**	**Cork City**	Coolock, Northside, Dublin
14:00	Abbie Brophy 60'	Report	Lauren Egbuloniu 6'; Ciara McNamara 18'; Nathalie O'Brien 34'	Stadium: Oscar Traynor Centre; Attendance: N/A; Referee: Sarah Dyas

3 October 2020	Galway	**2–3**	**Wexford Youths**	Galway
18:00	Méabh De Búrca 19'; Jamie Turrentine 64'	Report	Ciara Rossiter 41'; Vanessa Ogbonna 45'; Lauren Kelly 85'	Stadium: Eamonn Deacy Park; Attendance: N/A

3 October 2020	**Peamount United**	**1–0**	Shelbourne	Newcastle, County Dublin
18:30	Eleanor Ryan Doyle 13'	Report		Stadium: Greenogue; Attendance: N/A

3 October 2020	**Treaty United**	**2–0**	DLR Waves	Limerick
14:00	Gillian Keenan 66'; Aoife Horgan 83'	Report		Stadium: Jackman Park; Attendance: N/A

== Semi-finals ==
The draw for the semi-finals took place on 9 October 2020 live on RTÉ 2fm.

Quarter final
- **Cork City**
- **Peamount United**
- Treaty United
- Wexford Youths

8 November 2020	**Cork City**	**2–0**	Treaty United	Bishopstown, Cork
14:00	Saoirse Noonan 10', 13'	Report		Stadium: Bishopstown Stadium; Attendance: N/A; Referee: Clare Purcell

8 November 2020	Wexford Youths	**0–1**	**Peamount United**	Crossabeg
14:00		Report	Dearbhaile Beirne 53'; Lauren Kealy (yellow card) 77'	Stadium: Ferrycarrig Park; Attendance: N/A; Referee: Paula Brady

== Final ==
12 December 2020	Cork City	**0–6**	**Peamount United**	Tallaght, Dublin
15:15		Report	Roche 46', 52'; O'Gorman 76'; Duggan 81'; Watkins 84'; Ruddy 86'	Stadium: Tallaght Stadium; Attendance: N/A; Referee: Claire Purcell
Note: Live coverage on RTÉ2
