= Zara Aramyan =

Armenian actress and television host (1970–2026)

- Զառա Արամյան
- Born: 1 July 1970; Yerevan, Armenian SSR, Soviet Union
- Died: 17 January 2026 (aged 55); Yerevan, Armenia
- Occupations: Actress, presenter
- Children: 2 children – 1 daughter, 1 son

Zara Feliksi Aramyan (Armenian: Զառա Ֆելիքսի Արամյան; 1 July 1970 – 17 January 2026) was an Armenian television and radio host and actress, who was an Honored Figure of Culture of Armenia (2014), and Member of the Council of the Union of Journalists of Armenia.

== Education ==
Aramyan graduated from Yerevan Secondary School Number 30. From 1981 to 1985, she attended the Young Journalists' School of Julius Fučík․ From 1988 to 1995, Aramyan studied at the Russian Language and Literature Faculty of Yerevan State University, qualifying as a teacher of the Russian language and a journalist. In parallel with her studies, she was the editor of the student newspaper "The State University". Her works were published in the periodicals "Comsomolets", "Epoch" and "The Mirror" in 1989. From 1991 to 1993, she was a member of the editorial board of a number of scientific books by Academician of the Republic of Armenia Levon Mkrtchyan. In 1991, seven essays by the young Zara Aramyan dedicated to Armenia were published in the collection "Young Authors of Armenia" by Honored Figure of Culture of the Armenian SSR Shahen Tatikyan.

== Career ==
=== Radio and television ===
From 1993 to 1996, Zara Aramyan worked at the "Voice of Armenia" editorial office of the Armenian National Radio, the country's foreign broadcast division, as the head of the newly established Russian-language department, where she hosted and edited numerous social, political, and cultural programs for the Armenian Diaspora.

From 1996 to 2002, she worked at the "Voice of Armenia" editorial office as deputy editor-in-chief.

From 1993 to 2002, while working at the National Radio of Armenia, she authored the radio program "At the Guest of Zara", which was transferred to television in 1996 and later named "Tasty chat".

From 2003 to 2018, she worked at the Second Armenian TV Channel.

From 2015, she was a member of the organizing committee and commission of the "Renaissance" international cultural competition-festival. From 2017, Aramyan was a member of the board of the Union of Journalists of Armenia.

From 2018, she was the Armenian representative and committee member of the "SanRemo" International Children's Song Festival. From 1995, she starred in more than 300 television projects.

=== Acting career ===
Aramyan starred in numerous films, including:

- 1996 – Our Yard
- 1998 – "Our Yard 2"
- In 2008, she starred in the novel "True Stories" and hosted the program "Accord".
- In 2011 she starred as the main character in Vahram Sahakyan's play "The Furious".
- From 2012, she starred as the main character in the program "Human Resources Department" on Armenian Channel Two.

== Personal life and death ==
Aramyan was married and had two children: Elen Gasparyan and Gurgen Gasparyan. She died on 17 January 2026, at the age of 55.

== Awards and prizes ==
- 2014 – Awarded the title of Honored Figure of Culture of Armenia by the President of the Republic of Armenia.
- 2015 – Awarded a certificate of honor by the President of the National Assembly of the Republic of Armenia for her professional journalistic activities:
- 2015 – She was awarded the title "Armenian Woman 2015" by the National Trust Council in the "Great Recognition and Sympathy" nomination.
- 2015 – The author's program series "Tasty Chat" was recognized as the best program of the year by the "AAD" website.
- 2016 – She was recognized by the socio-political magazine "Parliament" as "The Beloved Armenian Woman of the Year, who has won the sympathy of the public."
- 2016 – Awarded the "Trust Rating 2016" certificate by the National Trust Council.
- 2017 – Awarded the "People's Favorite and High Rating" certificate by the National Trust Council.
- 2016 – She played the lead role in the feature film "Good Morning", which was awarded the "Golden Apricot" at the 13th "Golden Apricot" International Film Festival in 2017.
