= Fatima Al Zahraa Haider =

Fatima Al Zahraa Haider, the daughter of Zeinab Fahmy and Prince Ali Heidar Shannassi, who was a great-great-great grandchild of Muhammad Ali Pasha through his son Ibrahim Pasha. Noble Fatma Al-Zahra' was known as Fatma Heidar, and that is proven by the initials "FH" in many places of the Royal Jewelry Museum including the statues of the kings and princes of the Royal Family. Fatma Al-Zahra' was known for building a great multi-cultural designed palace, which is today the Royal Jewelry Museum in Zizenia, Alexandria, Egypt. The palace was constructed by her mother Zeinab Fahmy in 1919 and was completed by her in 1923. The palace is considered a unique example of art and architectural design derived from a mix of European styles and the Islamic style. The area of the Museum covers about 4,185 square miles (10,840 km^{2}) including the garden. Fatma Al-Zahra' was married to Mohamed Fayik Yeghen Bek in 1930. The couple shared 3 children: Fadel, Fayez, and Faiza, with Fayez and Faiza being fraternal twins. The date of her death is unknown, but, it is known that after the 1952 coup d'etat, she left Egypt and lived the rest of her life in Marseille, France.
