= Zehra Khan =

Pakistani trade unionist

General Secretary of the Home-Based Women Worker's Federation
- Incumbent
- Assumed office 2009

Personal details
- Education: Masters in Gender studies and BSC in clothing and textile

Zehra Khan is a Pakistani trade unionist and activist. She is the general secretary of the Home-Based Women Worker's Federation (HBWWF). She is a member of many tripartite committees including the Sindh Minimum Wage Board, the Sindh Tripartite Labour Standing Committee, the Sindh Occupational and Health Council, and the Sindh HBWs Governing Body.

== Career ==
When Khan was a student of the women studies department, she learned about contributions of home based workers and she took up the subject for her Master's thesis. In her study, she realized the need for legal rights that could protect these workers. Khan had the idea of forming federations by bringing workers from different industries. She started her door-to-door campaign of encouraging women to attend HBWWF's meetings. The meetings involved regular discussion circles which eventually convinced the women to join the organization's rallies.

The formation of unions started off with the bangle industry and gradually moved towards the garment industry. Khan then started working towards making a law specifically for home-based workers and so she started forming circles of them. Khan's work eventually led to the formation of unions in Sindh and Baluchistan, the first of its kind in South Asia. This culminated in the founding of the Home-Based Women Workers Federation on December 30, 2019.

Khan is also a part of civil society groups and associations. She is also an activist who has taken part in rallies and protests involving women's rights, human rights, labor rights, and minority protection. She has worked to bring awareness on the subject of workplace and sexual harassment and labor rights.
