= Royal Jewelry Museum =

Cultural museum in Alexandria, Egypt

Coordinates: 31.2407°N 29.9630°E

The Royal Jewelry Museum
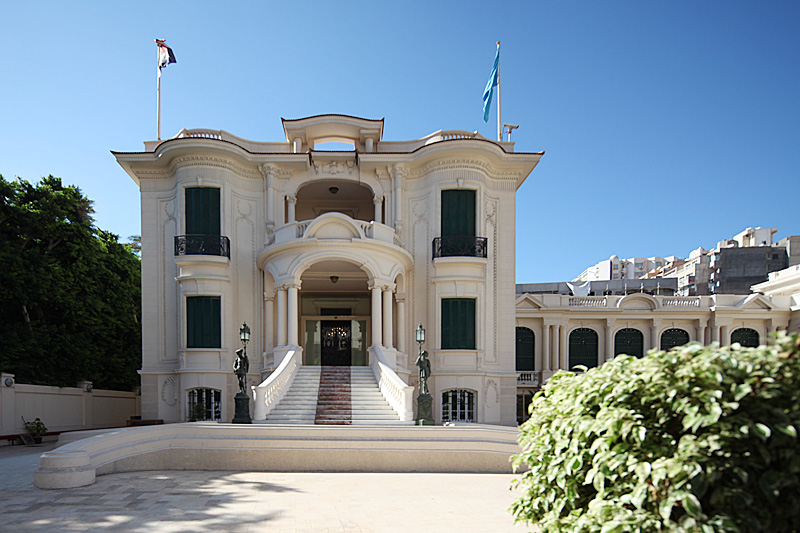
- Established: 1986
- Location: Alexandria, Egypt

The Royal Jewelry Museum (Arabic: متحف المجوهرات) is an art and history museum in Alexandria, Egypt. It is located in the former palace of Princess Fatma Al-Zahra' in Zizenia neighborhood. The building's halls contain an inestimable collection of jewels and jewelry of the Muhammad Ali Dynasty. 19th-century paintings, statues, and decorative arts are also exhibited in the rooms and lobbies. The museum was first inaugurated on 24 October 1986. After several years of renovations and expansion it was reopened in April 2010.

== Museum ==
The museum houses major jewelry pieces and art acquisitions of the dynasty of Muhammad Ali and his descendants, who ruled Egypt for nearly 150 years from 1805 until the 1952 movement. The mother of Princess Fatima had completed the construction of the western wing before her death, when her daughter had reached the age of eighteen. Princess Fatima added an eastern wing to the palace and linked the two wings with a beautiful corridor. The Palace remained in use for summer residence until July 1952. When the princess's property was confiscated, she was allowed to reside in the palace. This was until 1964, when Princess Fatima al-Zahra’ "ceded" the palace to the Egyptian government and left for Cairo. Princess Fatima al-Zahra died in 1983.

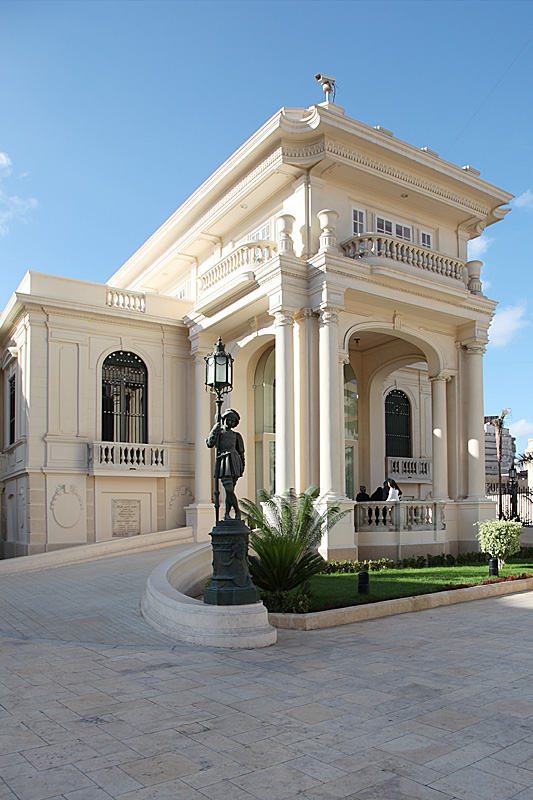
Right wing of the museum

Following 1952, the jewelry left by the Royal Family was kept secure and unseen until a 1986 decree by President Mubarak was issued to assign Princess Fatima Al-Zahra' Palace in Alexandria as a special museum to house those pieces.

The museum was renovated and developed in 1986 and 1994. Since late 2004, the Supreme Council of Antiquities has begun a comprehensive development and restoration process for the museum at an estimated cost of 10 million Egyptian pounds, with the aim of increasing its capacity to accommodate more valuable exhibits in stores that have not yet been displayed, and the museum was opened in April 2010.

== Palace design ==
The palace was built in 1919. Its walls and ceilings are adorned with oil paintings depicting various historical scenes and natural scenery. The palace windows are decorated with lead-inlaid glass artwork also depicting European-style historical scenes. It has 4,185 square metres (45,050 ft^{2}) of interior space, and is surrounded by gardens.

== See also ==
- Museums in Alexandria
- List of museums in Egypt
