= Abdolreza Rajabi =

Iranian political activist (1962–2008)

Abdolreza Rajabi (1962 – 30 October 2008) was a Kurdish Iranian, born in Mahidasht District, west of the Kermanshah Province. He died under suspicious circumstances in Reja'i Shahr Prison where he was being held as a political prisoner. His was one of at least seven deaths in custody in as many years that has raised questions about the state of human rights in Iran.

== Background ==
In 2001 Rajabi, a member of the People's Mojahedin Organization of Iran (PMOI), was seriously wounded by agents of the Ministry of Intelligence and National Security of Iran. He was captured and arrested. In 2006, a death sentence was issued after his arrest but later he was condemned to life imprisonment. According to reports by the Iranian Liberty Association, Rajabi was repeatedly submitted to extended periods of physical and psychological torture, both in Dize Abad and later in Tehran's Evin Prison, where he was also held in isolation. They also report that, as a means of trying to force him to abandon his opposition to the regime, the mullah's agents subjected Rajabi to mock executions, but he refused to surrender.

Abdolreza Rajabi was transferred to Gohardasht Prison on 26 October 2008. From there he was able to contact his family to inform them of the transfer, before the call was terminated by agents of the mullah's regime. According to the Iran Liberty Association, he was tortured and died in Gohardasht prison on 30 October 2008. FIDH, a publication by the Iranian League for the Defence of Human Rights (LDDHI), published on 10 December 2011, however, reports that he died in Rejayi-Shahr Prison.

== Condemnation by the British Parliamentary Committee for Iran Freedom ==
Following Abdolreza Rajibi's death, British MPs united to urge the UN to impose a ban on Iran. QC, and former UK Solicitor General, the Right Honourable Lord Archer of Sandwell, said of the killing of Rajabi, "Abdolreza Rajabi was tortured to death at the hands of those whose duty was to protect the law. His death was ordered by the mullahs. The mullahs don't debate with those who disagree with them; they silence them. They don't justify their position, because they cannot justify them. The torture committed by the mullahs is a crime against humanity." The chairman of the British Parliamentary Committee for Iran Freedom, Lord Corbett of Castle Vale, said that rather than represent Islam, the regime "defiles that religion."

In a satellite phone call from Camp Ashraf, the main base of the PMOI in Iraq's Diyala Province, Abdolreza Rajabi's daughter, Faezeh Rajabi, told the meeting of The British Parliamentary Committee for Iran Freedom on 6 November 2008, "For seven years, my father resisted the Iranian regime in its prisons. During those years, I was always waiting for him to come back. I always thought to myself that when I see him again, I would hug him very tightly and tell him everything about myself, until last week, when I was informed about his death. When we used to go visit my father in prison, I was very little. But I remember that every time, he was smiling and was very lively. Although I later found out that he had been horrendously tortured at that time, he never showed it and would not let us realise that he had so much pain.

When I got older, my father would tell us in every visit, "Go to Ashraf - that is where you belong." He would say that Ashraf is the hope of the Iranian people. At that time, I didn't understand what kind of a place Ashraf is. All I wanted was to be near him and hug him and kiss him in the visits we had once in a while, and tell him how much I missed him. When I came to Ashraf for a visit and then decided to stay here, I finally understood what he had said all along about Ashraf, and why he said it is the hope of our people.

== Death of Abdolreza's daughter, Faezeh Rajabi ==
Abdolreza Rajabi's daughter, Faezeh, was amongst 31 residents of Camp Ashraf who were killed during an attack at 4:45am (local time) on 8 April 2011 by Iraqi forces who attacked Camp Ashraf and shot dead or ran over the victims with Humvee armored vehicles. Maryam Rajavi, President-elect of the National Council of Resistance of Iran (NCRI), states that on the previous day she had urged Hillary Clinton, US Secretary of State, and the United Nations to intervene to prevent a bloodbath.
