= Zaara Yesmin =

Indian actress and model (born 1997)

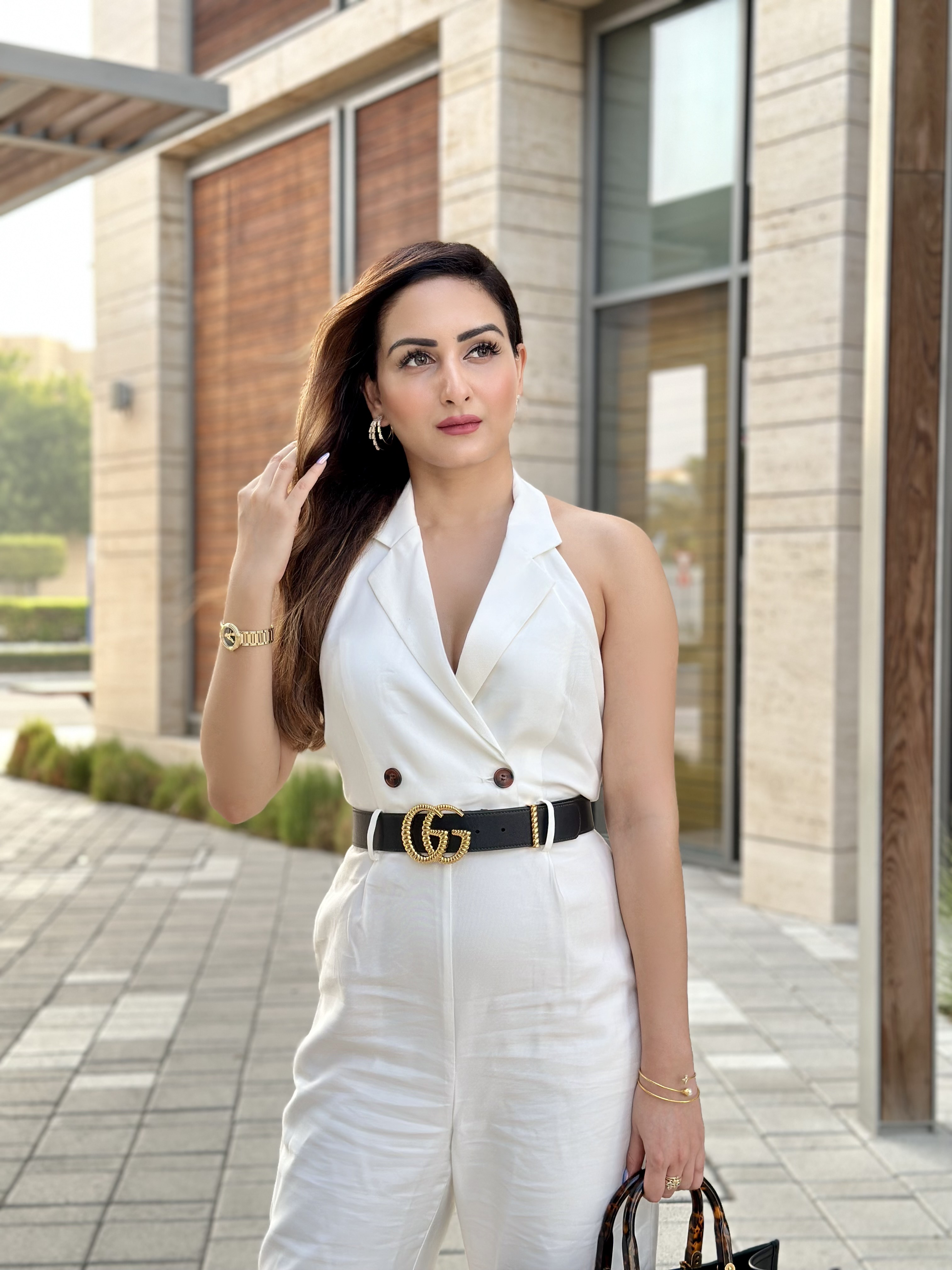
- Zaara Yesmin in 2023
- Born: 8 January 1997 (age 29); Assam, India
- Occupations: Actress; Model
- Awards: Femina Style Diva East
- Website: Zaara Yesmin at IMDb

Zaara Yesmin (born 8 January 1997) is an Indian actress and model. She is known for appearing in the music video for the song "Sab Ki Baaratein" which has received around 200 million views on YouTube. She has also appeared in television commercials. She won the title of "Femina Style Diva East" back in 2016.

== Career ==
The Punjabi song "Ik Waar", in which Yesmin appeared alongside Punjabi singers Falak Shabir and Guru Randhawa, served as the platform for her breakthrough in the entertainment industry. Yesmin has acted in numerous music videos. She started her career with Kannada film Superstar. Yesmin was awarded as best performance by Governor of Maharashtra Shri Bhagat Singh Koshyari in 2022. Zaara has recently starred in the music video "Sadi Gali 2.0" alongside Freddy Daruwala which was released by T-Series. Within a span of two weeks, the video has amassed over 5 million views.

== Filmography ==
=== Music videos ===
Year	Title	Singer(s)	Ref.
2016	"Ik waar"	Falak Shabir	
2017	"Nayan Ne Bandh Rakhine"	Darshan Raval	
2018	"Tere Te"	Guru Randhawa, Ikka	
2020	"Jutti"	Payal Dev, Ikka	
2020	"Kandhe Ka Woh Til"	Sachet Tandon	
2021	"Is Tarah Aashiqui Ka"	Dev Negi	
2022	"Sabki Baaratein Aayi"	Dev Negi, Seepi Jha	
2022	"Honthon Pe Bas"	Seepi Jha, Sameer Khan	
2022	"Behaal"	Karan Sehmbi, Simar Kaur	
2023	"Soneya Sajna"	Antara Mitra, Shoaib Ibrahim	
2023	"Sadi Gali 2.0"	Lehmber Hussainpuri, Shipra Goyal	
2023	"Latka"	Amit Mishra, Shilpa Surroch	
2024	"Yaara Dildaara"	Asha Bhosle, Harjot Kaur	
2024	"Sabki Baaratein Aayi 2"	Dev Negi, Seepi Jha	
