= Zahrah al Kharji =

Kuwaiti actress (born 1962)

Zahra Al Kharji (born January 15, 1962) is a Kuwaiti actress.

Al Kharji began her career at the Children's Theatre in 1983, in the role of "Hisbonh". She has been married twice, and is currently wed to theater director Ahmed Lhalal.
