= Lisa Fallon =

Irish football manager

Lisa Fallon is an Irish football manager. In 2021, she became the first female head coach of a professional men's football team, in Ireland/UK, when she was appointed by Galway United FC in the League of Ireland First Division. In 2013, she became the first female manager of an Irish male senior team when she was appointed Lakelands FC manager in the Leinster Football League (LFL). She holds a UEFA Pro Licence and currently works in FIFA's Global Football Development Division.
