= Zahra' Langhi =

Co-founder of Libyan Women's Platform for Peace (LWPP)

Zahra' Langhi (Arabic: الزهراء لنقي) is a human rights activist, peace activist, and expert on gender, conflict resolution, and peace building.

She specializes in prevention and countering violent extremism, women’s peace and security, and mediation and national dialogues. Her research intersects gender equality with Islamic history, metaphysics, mysticism, and female spirituality through comparative religions.

Langhi is also the co-founder and CEO of Libyan Women's Platform for Peace (LWPP), a socio-political movement focused on peace-building, inclusivity and gender equality.

Langhi’s work has gained international recognition by the Rockefeller Foundation, Helen Clark, and the Charter of compassion led by Karen Armstrong.

== Early life ==
Her family fled Libya in 1978 when she was three years old to London. They later moved to Cairo. Langhi credits exile for having grown up with a strong sense of national identity. The paradox was defining: she was Libyan and a stranger to her country. “Sometimes Libyans in exile are keen to be more traditional than Libyans in the country." …"Libya was our house; it was in our food and in our spices.”

Modern Libya is inseparable from Langhi’s heritage. Her great grandfather, Yusuf Langhi, was a central figure in the resistance movement against the Italian occupation, which caused his exile by the Italian fascist occupation. He later funded the first Libyan delegation to the UN (The delegation of Cyrnica) to negotiate the independence of Libya in 1949. After Libya gained its independence in 1951, Yusuf Langhi became the first mayor of Benghazi and member of the Congress. Her father, Ahmad Langhi, a long standing opposition member against Qaddafi's regime was elected after the revolution in 2012 as a member of the first elected National Congress in Libya in 52 years, and in 2016 as a member of the High State Council.

After 33 years, Langhi returns to play a prominent role in Libya’s liberation, this time from Gaddafi. She first went to Tripoli, the capital, in November 2011 to attend a meeting with the Libyan Women’s Platform for Peace (LWPP), a network she had co-founded just a month before. The aim of the LWPP was to ensure the political participation of women in post-Gaddafi Libya.

== Career ==
In 2011, Langhi co-founded Libyan Women's Platform for Peace (LWPP), with 35 leading Libyan women, and she is the organisation's director. She also coordinated the Libyan Women's Political Empowerment (LWPE) program, in conjunction with UNWomen and Karama.

In 2012, Langhi gave a TED Talk entitled “Why the Libyan Revolution Failed and What Might Work” and also co-produced and hosted 'Libya Speaks', a television show dedicated to the challenges of the democratic transition in Libya. Langhi has said that when she saw what social media could achieve in Egypt, she decided to call for a "day of rage" using Facebook in Libya, but now regrets this, saying that rather she should have called for "days and nights of compassion". She has said that rage is not enough to bring about genuine reform, and that achieving justice and dignity requires compassion.

Through the LWPP, Langhi led an advocacy campaign for electoral system reform in Libya and coordinated the first meetings between civil activists, senior revolutionaries, security and intelligence officers, and parliamentarians on DDR and SSR. Langhi led LWPP’s initiative of lobbying for the introduction of the zipper list (alternation of males and females in political parties) in the election law, which has secured 17.5 of the seats in the National Congress.

From 2016 to 2018, Langhi launched two strategic partnerships with the two oldest Islamic religious institutions, Es-Zitouna University and Al-Azhar, in an effort to bring together civil society and religious leaders from North Africa and the Sahel to discuss resilience-building efforts against extremism and human rights.

Langhi has contributed significantly to the body of research and literature on the Libyan transition. In 2017, Langhi participated in the UN Led peace talks/dialogue in the track of political leaders and activists. Additionally, in partnership with United States Institute of Peace, she led a research project that mapped Libya's religious sector as a way to understand the current and potential roles of religious actors in peacebuilding and countering violent extremism. In 2016, she led a research project on social capital and nation-building in Libya as part of the series ‘A Vision of Sustainable Peace’. Zahra' is also the author of several articles about the Libyan transition.

Langhi is a Member of the IFIT Inclusive Transitions Practice Group. The IFIT Inclusive Transitions Practice Group is a cross-cutting advisory service on the range of strategic choices that can bring about more inclusive dialogues and transitions in fragile and conflict-affected societies. Consisting of a combination of select experts in areas such as political-economic analysis, political settlements, economic transformation, media, and conflict resolution, the Practice Group provides advice and facilitation to social, political and business leaders involved in national dialogues and transitions.

Langhi has served as an advisory board member of the Arab Human Development (UNDP) Report on Youth, and as an advisor to the Preparatory Committee of the National Dialogue in Libya.

Langhi is an advisor to the Libyan National Dialogue. Along with Lord Alderdice, Langhi co-chaired The Hammamet Conference Series, an international platform for dialogue and progress in relations between the UK and North Africa.

In 2018, Langhi joined the UN- ESCWA (Economic Social Commission for West Asia). Her portfolio is women, peace and security agenda and prevention of violent extremism.

== Recognition ==
For International Women's Day, on 7 March 2014, The Guardian asked Helen Clark, head of the United Nations Development Programme (UNDP), and former prime minister of New Zealand, to select "Seven women to watch in global politics", and Langhi was one of those selected.

In 2016, Salt Magazine ranked Zahra' 26th on a list of 100 inspiring women working for the empowerment of women and peacebuilding.

In 2016, Zahra Langhi was named one of the 23 inspiring women fighting for women by the Charter of compassion led by academic scholar Karen Armstrong.

In 2018, The Rockefeller Foundation named Zahra' one of five women leaders introducing transformative change around the world.

== Academic Background ==
Langhi is a PhD candidate specialising in religion, violence, and reconciliation at Friedrich Schiller University at Jena. She holds an MA in Islamic History from the American University in Cairo.

== Works ==
=== Articles ===
- Sudan's female revolutionaries must beware fate that befell women in Libya. (The Guardian, 2019)
- On the 25th Anniversary of Beijing Platform for Action there is a need to adopt a local perspective. (Legal Agenda, 2018)
- Costing Violence against Women: Achievements and Goals. (AlSaffir AlArabi, 2019)
- Charting the Way Forward to Women Mediators in Libya. (Great Insights EDP, 2018)
- Seven Years of Impasse. Libya's Turbulent Transition. (LWPP, 2018)
- Ignoring Libya’s Constitutional Heritage is a Major Challenge in its Transition. (AlSaffir AlArabi, 2018)
- #WomenWhoInspireME Campaign an Attempt to Rediscover Roots of Women’e Movement in Libya. (AlSaffir AlArabi, 2018)
- The Other Travel Ban The World is Not Talking About (The Independent, 2017)
- Libya’s Religious Sector- Efforts of Peace building. (United States Institute of Peace, 2017)
- The Libyan Political Accord in Human Rights Lens. (AlMufakira AlQanuniyya, 2016)
- A Critical Reading in the UN led Libyan Dialogue and the Political Accord. (LWPP Publication, 2015)
- Gender and State Building in Libya: Towards a Politics of Inclusion. (The Journal of North African Studies, 2014)
- Gender, Women and the Arab Spring. “Gender and State Building in Libya: Towards a Politics of Inclusion". (Routledge, 2014)
- The Presumed Clash between Islamic Sharia and International Conventions regarding Women's Rights. (Reporting to Democracy, 2013)
- Women Leading Change in the Arab Spring: Libyan Women as Agents of Peace and Security. (2012)
- Women as Agents of Peace in Libya. The Annual Takaful Conference. (Gerhart Research Center at the American University in Cairo, 2012)
- 'Ajami Mysteries of Sitt 'Ajam Bint al-Nafis: A Study of a Feminine Hermeneutic of an Heiress of Ibn'Arabi (Journal of the Society of Ibn Arabi, Winter 2009)

=== Lectures ===
- IPW Lecture on Religion and Violence: The betrayal of tradition and the rise of modern extremist ideologies in Libya. Department of Political Science, University of Vienna, in cooperation with the research platform "Religion and Transformation in Contemporary Society". 2017.
- 51st Innsbrucker Gender Lecture on Gender and Peace Building Beyond the Question of Inclusion and Exclusion. Innsbruck University. 2017.
- Conference of Women, Gender and Politics at Queens College, New York University. 2016.
- And My Mercy Encompasses All": Peace in light of Akbari metaphysics of Compassion. Conference of the legacy of Ibn Arabi. Columbia University. 2015
- Understanding the Role of religious Actors in Confronting Violent Extremism. United Institute of Peace. 2015.
- Human Rights in the Streets: Leadership and Mobilization after the Arab Spring. Yale Law School. 2017.
- Why the Libyan Revolution Failed and Might Work?. TEDxWomen. 2013.
- Women's Rights and the New Arab Constitutions. Council of Foreign Relations. 2013.
- Maryam: A Sufi Perspective- A symbol of receptive Universal Soul and the Creative Matrix. Oxford University. 2014.
- Gender and State-Building in the Middle East: Informing Yemeni Constitutional Reform with Global Lessons, Local Contexts aims to bring to the fore an inter-regional dialogue on sound approaches to secure long-term reform for Arab women’s rights during a period of political change and economic uncertainty in Yemen and across the region. Organized by the World Bank and the State Effectiveness Institute in Washington DC. 2013.
- Challenges to Women’s Security in the MENA Region. United Institute of Peace: Woodrow Wilson Center in Washington DC. 2013.
- Finding Peace in Libya. The Times Cheltenham Literature Festival 2012. Co-organized by the Interfaith Program at Cambridge University. 2012.
- British Reputation and the Arab Spring: Building trust and relationships in times of upheaval. Cambridge University, Magdalene College. 2012.
