= Niamh Reid Burke =

Irish footballer

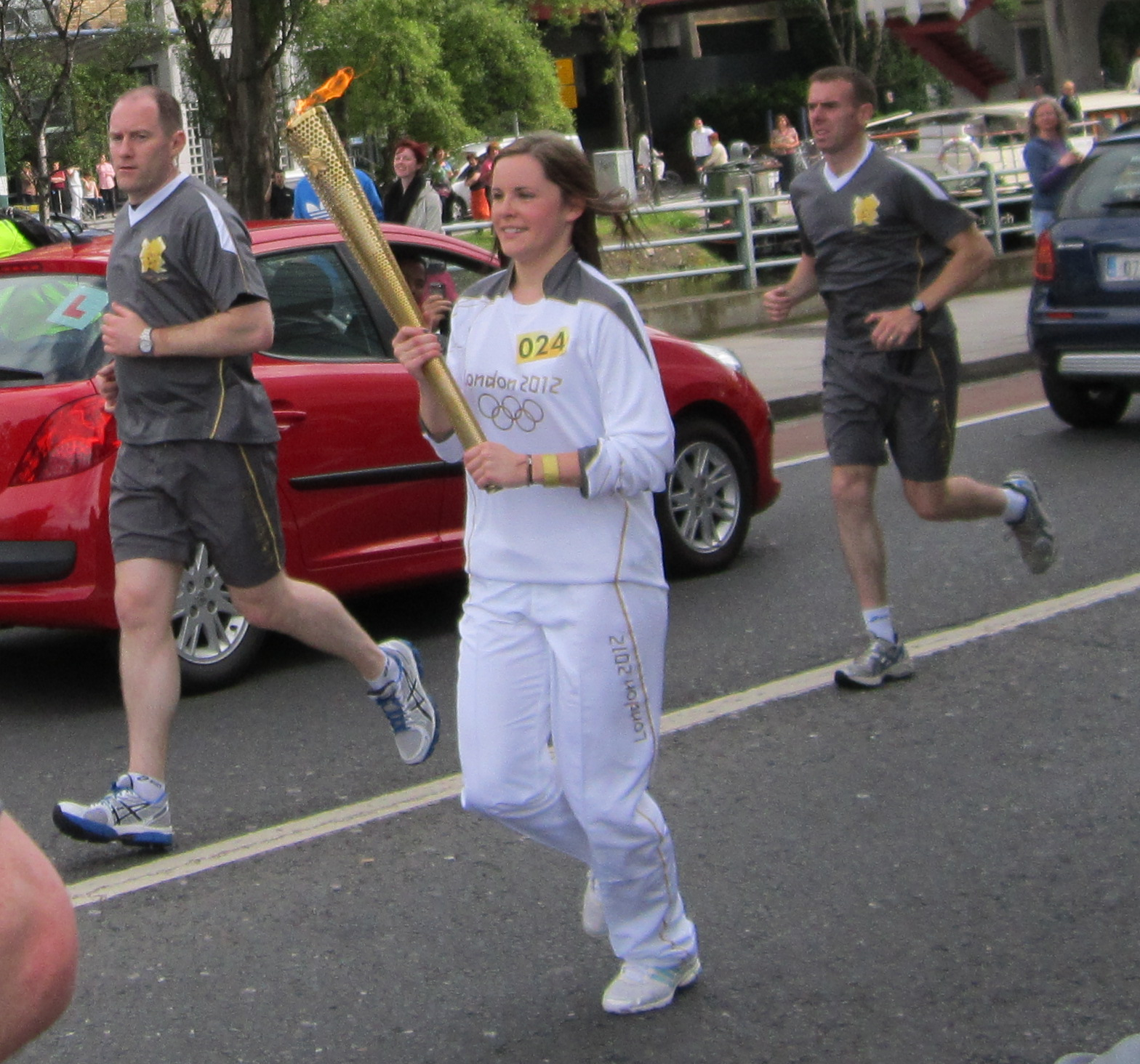
- Reid Burke carrying the 2012 Olympic torch in Dublin

Personal information
- Full name: Niamh Reid Burke
- Date of birth: 6 August 1991 (age 35)
- Place of birth: Dublin, Ireland
- Height: 1.69 m (5 ft 7 in)
- Position: Goalkeeper

Youth career
- Raheny United

Senior career*
Years	Team	Apps	(Gls)
- Raheny United
2015–2017	Shelbourne		
2018–2024	Peamount United		

International career^{‡}
2014–2021	Republic of Ireland	5	(0)
- * Club domestic league appearances and goals ‡ National team caps and goals as of 22:30, 11 April 2021 (UTC)

Niamh Reid Burke (born 6 August 1991) is an Irish former association footballer who played as a goalkeeper for Women's National League (WNL) team Peamount United. She made five appearances for the senior Republic of Ireland national team, from her debut in 2014 until her retirement from international football in 2021.

== Club career ==
Reid Burke was playing for Raheny United when the Women's National League (WNL) was formed in 2011 and represented the club in the competition's first season. Over the next three seasons, she won two league titles and three consecutive FAI Women's Cups with "The Pandas." She also represented the club in the UEFA Women's Champions League.

For the 2015–16 season, Reid Burke remained with the club in their new guise as Shelbourne Ladies. She switched to Dublin rivals Peamount United ahead of the 2018 Women's National League season. She was part of the team as "The Peas" secured the 2019 Women's National League title.

Reid Burke helped Peamount United secure a League and Cup "double" in their 2020 campaign. She also played well in Peamount's November 2020 UEFA Women's Champions League fixture with Scottish Women's Premier League club Glasgow City, which was lost on penalties after a 0–0 draw. During the season Reid Burke had rejected several transfer offers from professional clubs outside Ireland, because the salaries on offer were too low.

== International career ==
Reid Burke was Ireland's first-choice goalkeeper at under 17 level. She then progressed to the under 19 team, initially as understudy to Lynn Bradley. At the 2014 Cyprus Cup she won her first senior cap in a 1–1 draw with South Korea.

She made her next appearance and the first start against Austria at the 2015 Istria Cup, a 2–0 defeat. She also featured in the next game against Costa Rica, as Ireland won 2–1 and limped to a ninth-place finish at the tournament. Early in the second half, established goalkeeper Emma Byrne was injured in the act of conceding a penalty kick, which substitute Reid Burke saved.

In May 2015, Reid Burke was pressed into action again for a daunting friendly away to world champions the United States. After the match was arranged it came to light that it was outside FIFA's designated dates for international matches, so Byrne's English club Arsenal would not release her. Reid Burke acquitted herself well in Ireland's 3–0 defeat, but conceded a bizarre first-half goal when she ignored the ball to comfort injured teammate Méabh De Búrca.

While attending the Institute of Technology, Blanchardstown, she represented Ireland at the 2015 Summer Universiade in Gwangju, South Korea.

In March 2021, Reid Burke decided to withdraw from Ireland coach Vera Pauw's squad for two friendlies against Denmark and Belgium, and retire from international football. She had won the last of her five senior caps at the 2016 Cyprus Cup, in a 1–1 draw with Italy. Reid Burke had fallen from favour under Pauw's predecessor Colin Bell, and acknowledged that she was "not his cup of tea" as a goalkeeper.

== Personal life ==
Reid Burke is from Clonsilla and served as a torch bearer in the 2012 Summer Olympics torch relay. She was also national champion at youth level in diving. In August 2012 Reid Burke made an allegation of trespass and assault against a policeman (Irish: Garda Síochána) following a boozy late night quarrel over a mobile phone.
