= Daire Keogh =

Irish historian and third-level educational leader

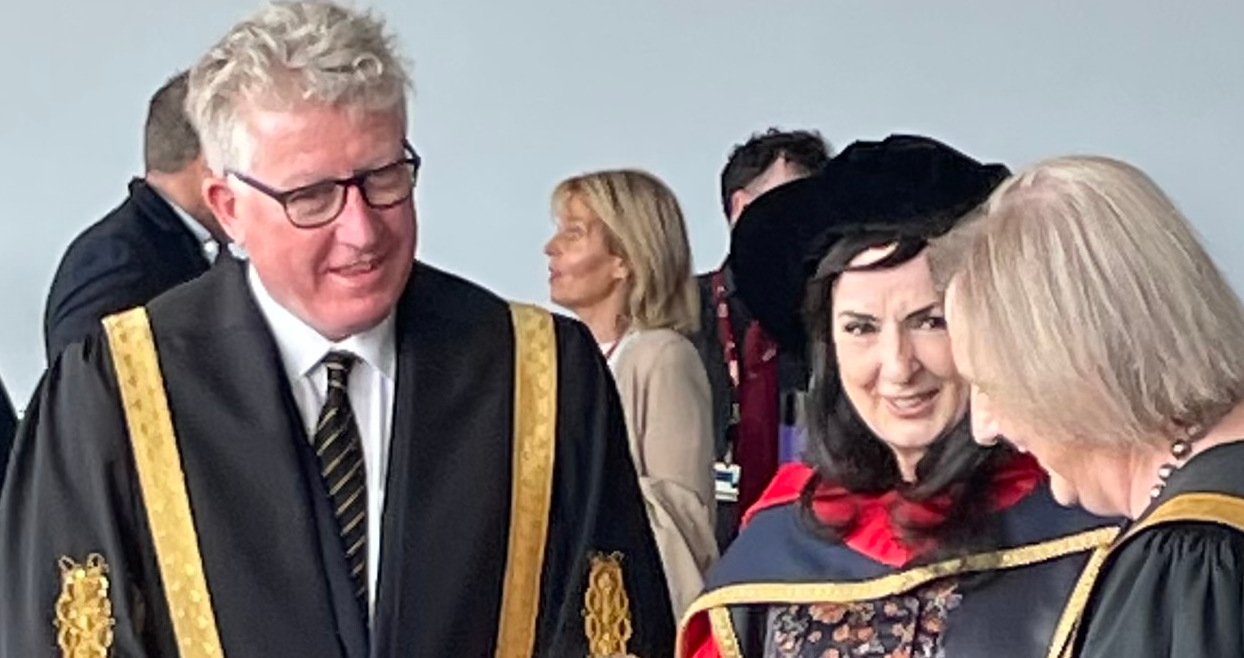
- Daire Keogh, President of DCU, Ireland, with musician Moya Brennan at an official DCU event in 2022
- Born: July 1964 (age 62)
- Spouse: Katie Keogh
- Children: 4

Academic background
- Education: Synge Street CBS
- Alma mater: University College Dublin

Academic work
- Discipline: Historian
- Institutions: St Patrick's College (Drumcondra); Dublin City University

Daire Kilian Keogh (born July 1964) is an academic historian and third-level educational leader, president of Dublin City University (DCU) since July 2020.

Keogh graduated in history, later taking a PhD while working part-time as a school teacher. He was a lecturer at a number of Irish third-level institutions, and then professor at, and later president (2012–2016) of, Ireland's main teacher training college, St Patrick's, Drumcondra. He has written or edited more than a dozen books in the fields of Irish revolutionary and religious history. After St Patrick's merged fully into DCU he was appointed as the university's deputy president, and after a long search process in 2018 and 2019, he was selected to become DCU's fourth president as of July 14, 2020, for a term of 10 years.

== Early life and education ==
Daire (sometimes written Dáire) Keogh was born to Peter and Cora Keogh of Rathfarnham, and has four brothers and a sister. His father owned and ran Peter's Pub between South William Street and St Stephen's Green in central Dublin. He attended Loreto Abbey National School, then Synge Street CBS. He studied history, economics and philosophy at University College Dublin (UCD, within the National University of Ireland), securing a Bachelor of Arts in history. He then studied for the priesthood at the Pontifical Gregorian University in Rome, and while he did not pursue ordination, received a qualification (BPh) there.

== Academic career ==
On his return to Ireland he started work as a teacher at St Mac Dara's Community College in Templeogue and successfully pursued a PhD in history at Trinity College Dublin. He graduated in 1993, with a thesis entitled The Catholic Church and Radicalism in Ireland in the 1790s. He lectured and performed research at a range of Irish third-level institutions, including UCD, Trinity College, one or both of the universities in Maynooth, UCG, St Patrick's College, Drumcondra and the Oscail remote education centre hosted by DCU. He also held a post for a time as adjunct professor at the University of Notre Dame, near South Bend in Indiana, one of the leading Catholic universities in North America Keogh also took a master's degree in theology at the University of Glasgow.

Keogh lectured in Early Modern European and Irish history from at least 2001 in the Department of History within the Faculty of Humanities at St Patrick's College, Drumcondra, previously an autonomous institution but by then a college of DCU. By 2011, he was a senior lecturer. He also served as head of quality assurance. He then held a named chair, as Cregan Professor of Modern Irish History. He has also held the post of fellow at the University Design Institute at Arizona State University.

He was President of St Patrick's from 2012 to 2016, overseeing a broadening of its curriculum and the construction of a new library building. He also became a director of the college's fundraising foundation. St Patrick's fully merged into Dublin City University – forming the base for an Institute of Education, also incorporating other colleges, and a partial base for a faculty of humanities. This process Keogh led for St Patrick's. He was appointed as deputy president of DCU, and his responsibilities included the non-academic aspects of student life, such as welfare, sporting and social activities, as well as interaction with DCU's alumni, and the university's strategic planning process. He also played a key role in agreeing the move of the 140,000-volume library of the Jesuit order in Ireland to the branch of DCU's library at the All Hallows campus. Keogh was selected in 2019 for the Staff Leadership Award, presented at the annual dinner of DCU's Leadership Circle of major donors.

=== Areas of study ===
Keogh's research and publications work addresses aspects of Irish history including politics, education, religion and gender. Specifically he has specialised in aspects of the history of the Catholic Church in Ireland and revolutionary politics in the 18th century. He has won funding from the state-sponsored Irish Research Council and its predecessor the Irish Research Council for the Humanities and Social Sciences (IRCHSS), on at least two occasions: in 2007 he secured a senior research fellowship for work on the history of the Irish Christian Brothers and from 2008, project grant funding for work to edit and publish the correspondence of Cardinal Paul Cullen, for which he remains, as of 2020, principal investigator. Keogh also chairs the editorial committee of DCU's journal of Irish Studies, Studia Hibernica, which covers the fields of history, folklore, toponymy and the Irish language.

=== Voluntary posts ===
He has served as vice-president of a national trade union, the Irish Federation of University Teachers, and was nominated by that body as a member of an EU third-level education quality assurance body, the European Quality Assurance Register (EQAR), and the governing body of Ireland's National Council for Curriculum and Assessment, which oversees the primary school curriculum.

Keogh became a member of the Policy and Standards Committee of Quality and Qualifications Ireland, the state body responsible for overseeing the Irish third-level qualifications framework and quality assurance structures, in April 2017, and resigned with effect from July 2020, after his appointment as DCU president. Keogh also chairs the Higher Education and Research Committee of the British Irish Chamber of Commerce, and has written an article in a national newspaper setting out some committee positions and concerns around Brexit.

As of 2020 he is, in a private capacity, a member of the governing body of the Edmund Rice Schools Trust, which manages more than 90 Catholic schools, and where he served for some time along with DCU's founding president, Danny O'Hare. He has also been a member of the boards of both national schools in Drumcondra and Rathfarnham and the secondary school Clongowes Wood College.

Keogh has also appeared on radio programmes, including speaking about the legacy of Cardinal Cullen on RTÉ Radio 1. He has also spoken on the topic of capturing oral accounts of the COVID-19 pandemic.

Keogh has qualified as a Chartered Director at the Institute of Directors. He was a director, from 2013 to 2017, of the think tank, the Centre for Cross-Border Studies, and has been a director of Women for Election which aims to boost the supply and confidence of women electoral candidates, since 2014.

=== DCU presidency ===
Keogh was selected in December 2019, after an 18-month international search process, and appointed by the governing authority for a term of ten years.

== Personal life ==
In November 2000 Keogh married Katherine (Katie) Schott, from Indianapolis, Indiana, at the on-campus basilica of the University of Notre Dame. His wife, a graduate of Notre Dame (Lewis Hall, 1998), later a project manager and communications specialist, had moved to Ireland as associate director of the Dublin branch operation of the university in 1998. She also worked for the award-winning Childhood Development Initiative in Tallaght, and both the US Embassy and the American Chamber in Ireland. Mrs Keogh also served as lead for the DCU Alumni Emerging Leaders Programme. The Keoghs have four children. The family lived in the Dublin suburb of Rathfarnham, where they support, and held officer positions with, the Rathfarnham Concert Band Society. Keogh co-edited a book on Rathfarnham's links with Irish revolutionary activity.

== Publications ==
Keogh has authored or edited, individually or jointly, at least 16 books on aspects of history, and various papers, as well as contributing multiple articles to the Dictionary of Irish Biography.

Books

- The United Irishmen: Republicanism, Radicalism and Rebellion (edited by David Dickson, Dáire Keogh and Kevin Whelan. Dublin, 1993: Lilliput Press)
- The mighty wave: the 1798 rebellion in Wexford (eds: Dáire Keogh & Nicholas Furlong. Dublin, 1996: Gill and Macmillan)
- The Women of 1798 (eds: Furlong, Nicholas and Keogh, Dáire. Dublin, 1998: Four Courts Press) ISBN 9781851823598
- Rebellion: a television history of 1798 (accompanying an RTE TV series) (Thomas Bartlett, Kevin Dawson, Dáire Keogh, 1998. Dublin, 1998: Gill and Macmillan) ISBN 9780717127610
- A patriot priest: the life of Father James Coigly, 1761–1798 (edited by Dáire Keogh. Cork, 1998: Cork University Press)
- History of the Catholic Diocese of Dublin (eds: James Kelly and Daire Keogh. Dublin, 2000: Four Courts Press)
- Acts of Union: the causes, contexts, and consequences of the Act of Union (edited by Dáire Keogh and Kevin Whelan. Dublin, 2001: Four Courts Press)
- Christianity in Ireland: revisiting the story (edited by Brendan Bradshaw and Dáire Keogh. Dublin, 2002: Columba Press)
- 1798: A Bicentenary Perspective (edited with Thomas Bartlett, David Dickson and Kevin Whelan. Dublin, 2003: Four Courts Press)
- The Irish College, Rome and its world (eds: Keogh, Dáire and McDonnell, Albert. Dublin, 2008: Four Courts Press) ISBN 9781846820540
- Edmund Rice and the first Christian Brothers (Dáire Keogh (announced as the first of a series on the history of the Christian Brothers). Dublin, 2008: Four Courts Press)
- Cardinal Paul Cullen and His World (eds: Keogh, Dáire and McDonnell, Albert. Dublin, 2011: Four Courts Press) ISBN 9781846822353
- Rebellion & revolution in Dublin: voices from a suburb, Rathfarnham, 1913–23 (eds: Hay, Marnie and Keogh, Dáire. Tallaght, Dublin, 2016: South Dublin County Libraries) ISBN 9780957511590)

Articles

- Forged in the Fire of Persecution: Edmund Rice (1762–1844) and the Counter-Reformationary Character of the Irish Christian Brothers, "Essays in the History of Irish Education", editor: Brendan Walsh; London, 2016: Palgrave Macmillan (Macmillan Publishers); pp. 83–104.
- The Dictionary of Irish Biography articles on Fr Thomas Betagh, Bishop James Caulfield, Fr James Coigly, Friar William Gahan, Bishop Thomas Hussey, Fr John Martin, Christian Brothers founder Edmund Ignatius Rice and Archbishop J.T. Troy.

Academic offices
Preceded by Brian MacCraith July 2010 – July 2020	President of Dublin City University; July 2020 –	Succeeded by (incumbent)
