= List of Dublin City University faculties, schools, research centres and laboratories =

This list of Dublin City University faculties, schools, research centres and laboratories covers the university's diverse and interdisciplinary research interest.

== Faculties and Schools ==
- Faculty of Engineering & Computing
  - School of Computing
  - School of Electronic Engineering
- Faculty of Science & Health
  - School of Biotechnology
  - School of Chemical Sciences
  - School of Health & Human Performance
  - School of Mathematical Sciences
  - and Human sciences/index.shtml School of Nursing and Human Sciences
  - School of Physical Sciences
- DCU Business School (DCUBS)
- Faculty of Humanities & Social Sciences
  - School of Applied Language & Intercultural Studies
  - School of Communications
  - School of Education Studies
  - FIONTAR (Business, Communications, Computing, Finance, Journalism and European Languages through Irish)
  - School of Law & Government

== Research Centres ==
- BDI Biomedical Diagnostics Institute
- BEST Biomedical and Environmental Sensor Technology Centre
- CBAS Centre for Bioanalytical Sciences
- CDVP Centre for Digital Video Processing
- CEE Centre for Educational Evaluation
- CFDH Centre for Future Diagnostics and Health
- CIS Centre for International Studies
- CNGL Centre for Next Generation Localisation
- City Biologic
- CLPR Centre for Laser Plasma Research
- CMDE Centre for Modelling with Differential Equations
- CSE Centre for Software Engineering
- CSSH Centre for Sport Science and Health
- CASTeL Centre for the Advancement of Science Teaching and Learning
- CTTS Centre for Translation and Textual Studies
- CTYI Centre for the Talented Youth of Ireland
- CVRC Computer Vision Research Centre (Computer Vision and Medical Imaging)
- Eeolas Institute at Citywest Business Campus
- ExWell Medical (multidisciplinary exercise and sports medicine clinic)
- Fighting Blindness Vision Research Institute
- ICNT International Centre for Neurotherapeutics
- Institute for Ethics
- Invent Innovation and Enterprise Centre
- Irish Association for American Studies
- Irish Learning Technology Association
- Irish Migration, Race and Social Transformation
- Lero, The Irish Software Engineering Research
- LInK Leadership, Innovation and Knowledge Research Centre
- Maths Learning Centre

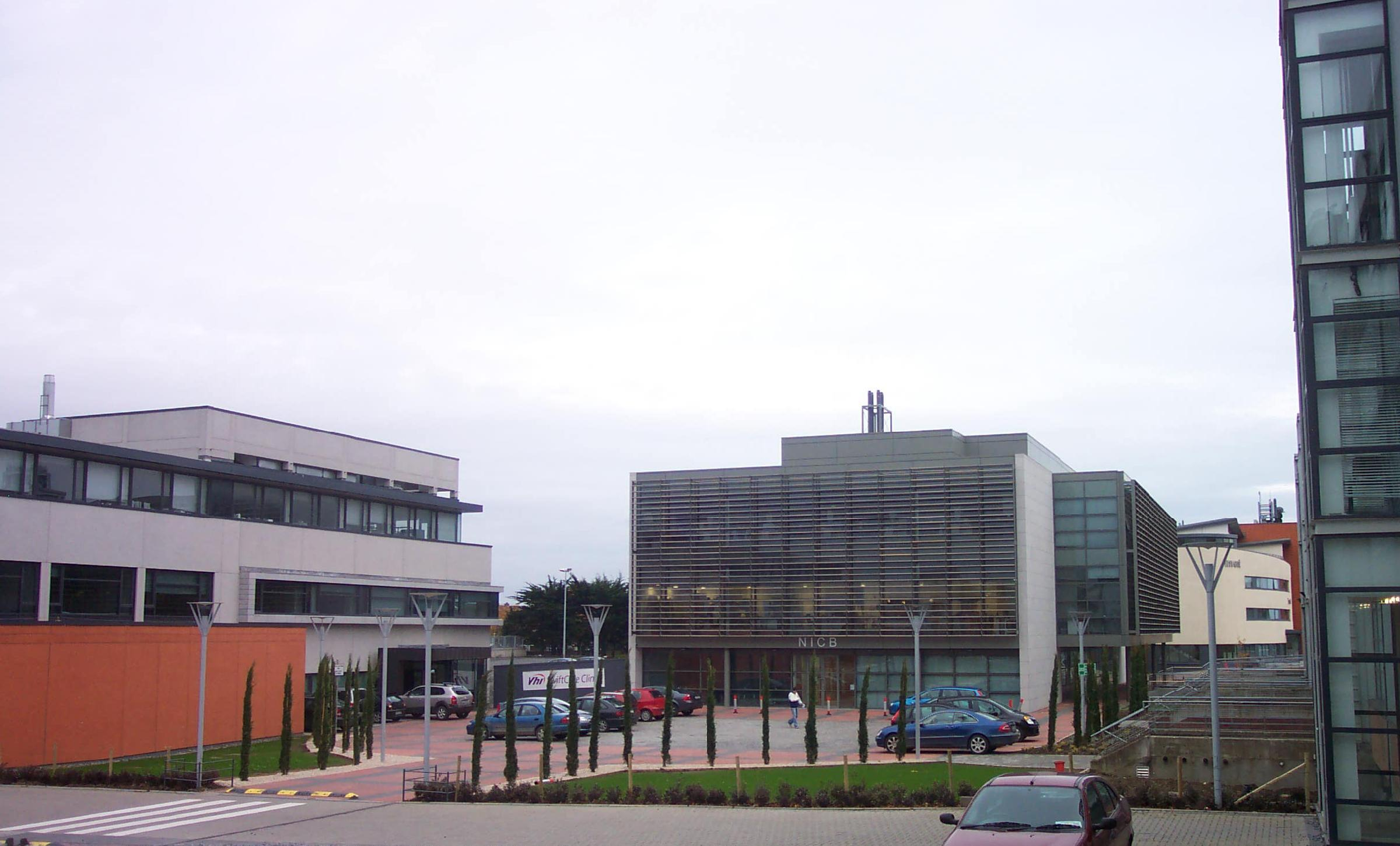
The National Institute for Cellular Biotechnology, one of DCU's many research centres.

- National Anti-Bullying Centre
- MPRC Materials Processing Research Centre
- NCLT National Centre for Language Technology
- NCPST National Centre for Plasma Science & Technology
- NCSR National Centre for Sensor Research
- NCTE National Centre for Technology in Education
- NICB National Institute for Cellular Biotechnology
- NJLRC National Japanese Language Resource Centre
- NTTC National Tennis Training Centre, Albert College Park
- Optronics Ireland
- PEI Technologies (Power Electronics)
- PlasMAC Centre for Plasma Formation, Measurement and Control
- RINCE Research Institute for Networks and Communications Engineering
- SCI-SYM Centre for Scientific Computing & Complex Systems Modelling
- SIM Centre for Society Information and Media
- STeM Centre for Society, Technology & Media
- TELTEC (Telecommunications)
- The Karl Popper Web
- VHRC Vascular Health Research Centre

== Laboratories and Research Groups ==
- Adaptive Sensors Group
- Advanced Plasma Etch Laboratory (Intel Ireland)
- Applied Biochemistry Group
- Archport Laboratories
- Artificial Life Laboratory
- Astrophysics Group
- Biocomputation Laboratory
- Bioinformatics and Molecular Evolution
- Computational Physics Laboratory (Intel Ireland)
- CHIME and Jmol Pages
- Control Systems Group
- eAccessibility Laboratory
- Environmental Flow Modelling Group
- EURATOM-DCU (Fusion Power Research Association)
- French Politics and Policy Group
- High Performance Negative Ion Source Group
- Interoperable Systems Group
- LAM Research Laboratory
- Machine Translation Group
- Machine Vision Group
- Microelectronics Research Laboratory
- Modelling & Scientific Computing Group
- Modelling and Simulation Research Group
- Nanomaterials Processing Laboratory
- North Dublin Coalition
- Optical Sensors Laboratory
- Patients' rights research Group
- Performance Engineering Laboratory
- Plasma Research Laboratory
- Semiconductor Spectroscopy Laboratory (Ramon)
- Surface Science Research Laboratory
- Radio and Optical Communications Laboratory
- RF Modelling and Simulation Group
- Sensors and Separations Group
- Speech Group
- Switching and Systems Laboratory
- Thin Film Materials Research Laboratory
- Virtual Communities Group
- Virtual Community Projects Laboratory
- Virtual Pathology
- Virtual Reality Applications Laboratory
- Vision Systems Laboratory
