= DCU Ryan Academy =

Unit of Dublin City University that operates entrepreneurial programmes

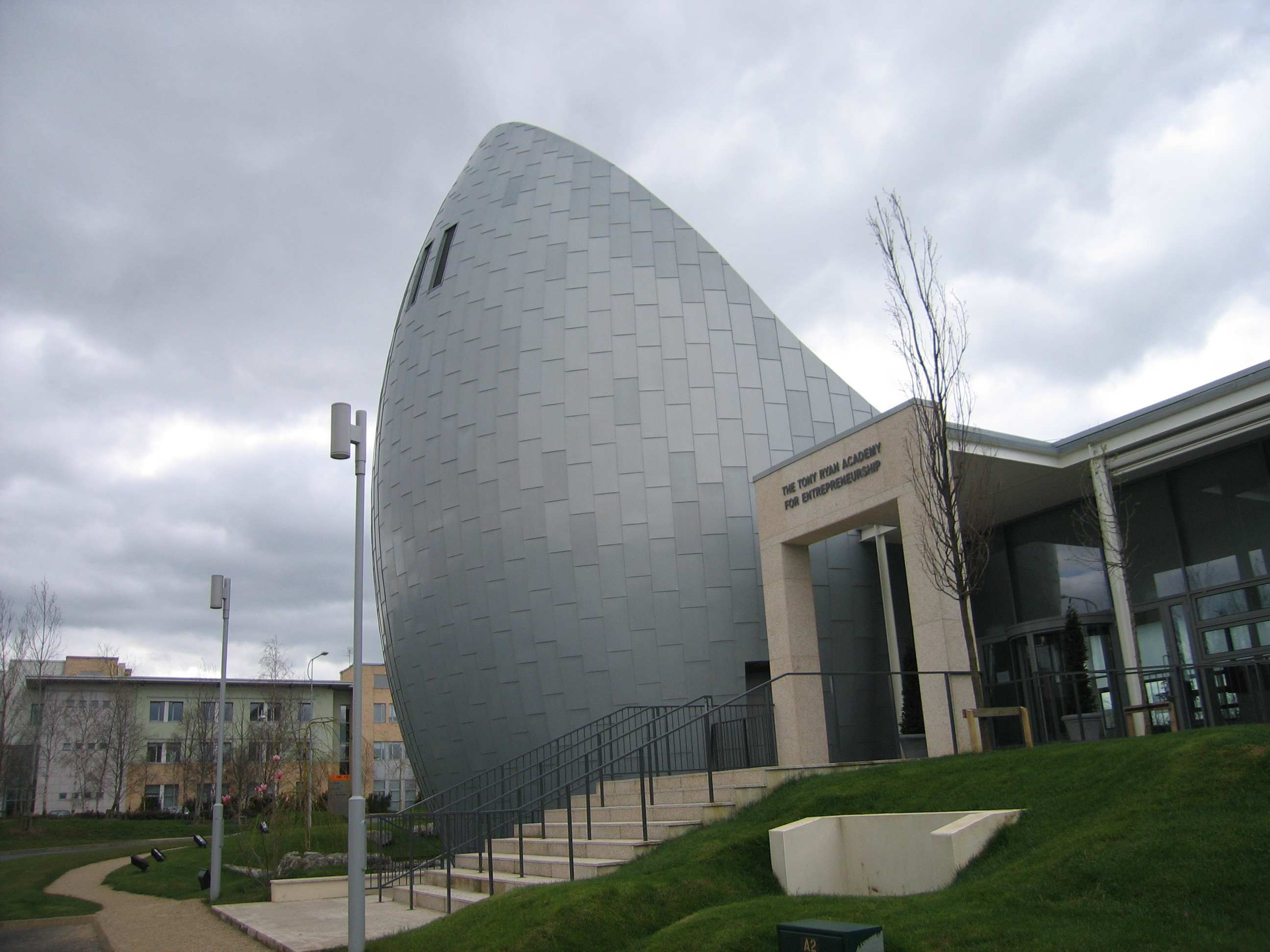
Ryan Academy building

The DCU Ryan Academy for Entrepreneurship is a unit of Dublin City University (DCU) in Ireland. Originally based at the Citywest business park between Saggart and Rathcoole on the southwestern edge of Dublin, and later at DCU's Innovation Campus at the DCU Alpha facility in Glasnevin, it operates a range of academic and entrepreneurial programmes.

== History ==
=== eEolas Institute ===
The academy was the sole initiative of the eEolas Institute, a joint venture between DCU, the family of Tony Ryan, and Davy Hickey Properties, intended to develop the relationship between academic institutions and enterprise in Ireland. It opened in October 2005, and was home to the Entrepreneurs' Organisation in Ireland, and also hosted the Irish arm of the US-based National Foundation for Teaching Entrepreneurship (NFTE), which helps young people from less well-off backgrounds to build skills. The sponsors invested 10 million euro. The academy appointed 174 leading professionals as Fellows in 2007.

=== Closure ===
The institute, campus and Ryan Academy were closed during 2008, after the initial investment was followed by 1.3 million euro of losses. The holding company, Eeolas Institute Ltd., was dissolved, and the website, and current references on DCU's website, were deleted.

=== Ryan Academy relaunch ===
The Ryan Academy was re-opened in February 2009. A new director was appointed and a website launched. There was no further news on the eEolas Institute.

== Facilities ==
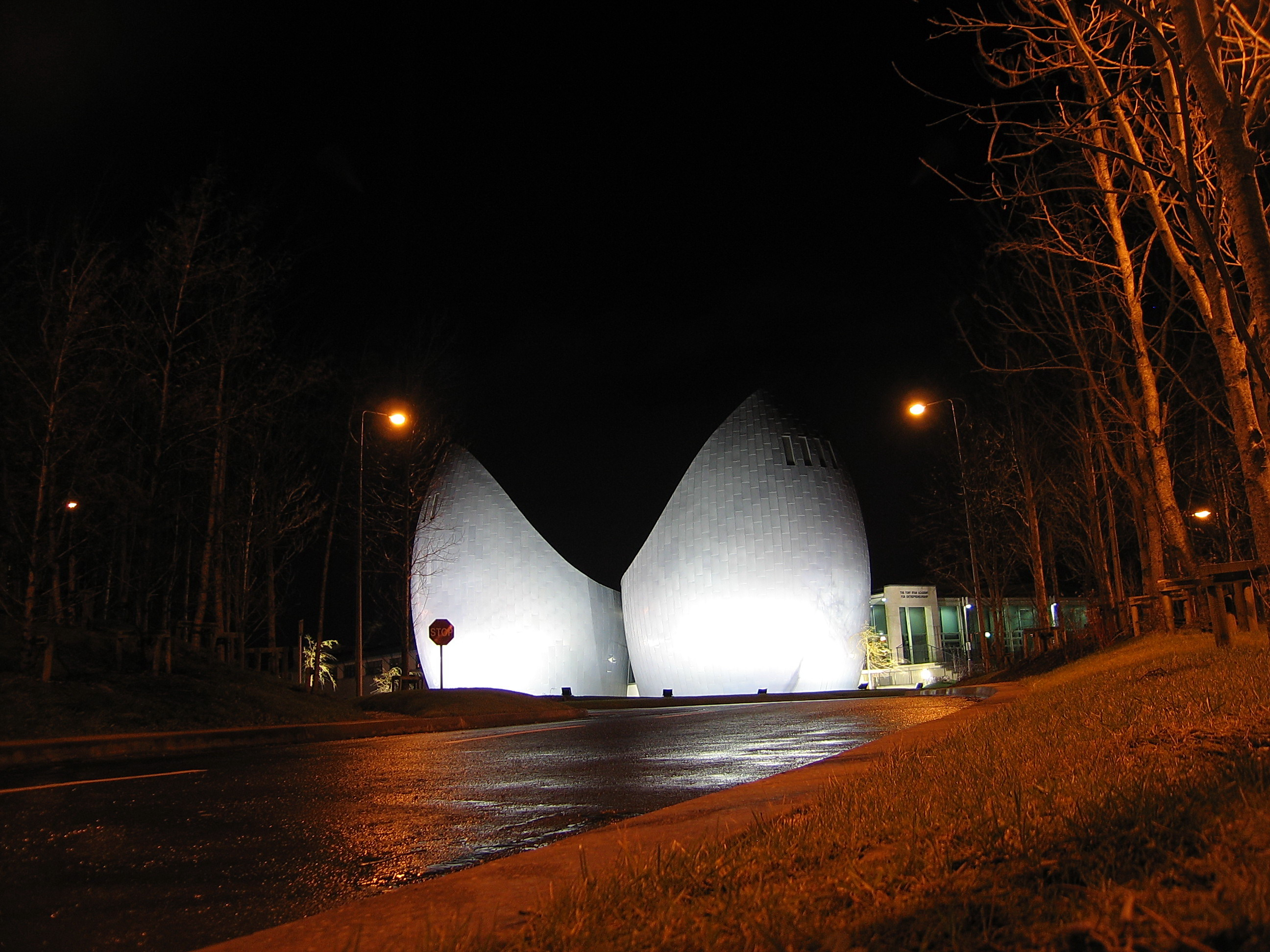
Ryan Academy, Citywest

The academy began in a "landmark" building at the Brownsbarn end of the Citywest business park between Saggart and Rathcoole, on the southwestern edge of Dublin. The Citywest building consists of a single structure in a landscaped area, and includes teaching and collaboration spaces, offices and a café. As of 2019 the academy is based at DCU's Innovation Campus at the DCU Alpha building in Glasnevin.

== Activities ==
The academy works on education and networking, promoting programmes relevant to the needs of existing and future entrepreneurs and supportive of the government's "Smart Economy" and social policies, as well as research related to entrepreneurship and innovation. It also pursues collaboration initiatives, forming and coordinating national and international partnerships with universities, state agencies, social bodies, companies including multinationals and small and medium enterprises. The academy also works in collaboration with others in innovation, for example working on the Your Country Your Call project that was launched by President Mary McAleese in February 2010.

The academy also delivers short courses in subjects such as social enterprise development, business foresight, entrepreneurship for engineers and new product development, and longer term courses for post-doctoral students in DCU (originally under the academy's Director of Programmes, Gordon McConnell).
