= Dublin City University =

University in Ireland, founded 1975

- Ollscoil Chathair Bhaile Átha Cliath
- Motto: Ireland's University of Enterprise
- Type: Public university
- Established: 1975; 51 years ago
- Affiliations: AACSB; AMBA; IUA; UI; ECIU; EUA; ESB Reutlingen
- Chancellor: Cathal Marley
- President: Daire Keogh
- Faculty: 624
- Students: 20,377
- Location: Dublin, Ireland; 53.384954°N 6.256542°W
- Campus: Urban, 38 hectares (94 acres)
Colours
- Website: www.dcu.ie

Dublin City University (abbreviated as DCU; Irish: Ollscoil Chathair Bhaile Átha Cliath) is a university based on the Northside of Dublin, Ireland. Created as the National Institute for Higher Education, Dublin in 1975, it enrolled its first students in 1980, and was elevated to university status (along with the NIHE Limerick, now the University of Limerick) in September 1989 by statute.

In September 2016, DCU completed the process of incorporating four other Dublin-based educational institutions: the Church of Ireland College of Education, All Hallows College, Mater Dei Institute of Education and St Patrick's College.

As of 2025, the university has 20,377 students and over 110,000 alumni. There were 1,690 staff in 2019. Notable members of the academic staff included the late former Taoiseach, John Bruton and "thinking" Guru Edward de Bono. Bruton accepted a position as Adjunct Faculty Member in the School of Law and Government in early 2004 and De Bono accepted an adjunct Professorship in the university in mid-2005.

The founding president of the institution was Danny O'Hare, who retired in 1999 after 22 years' service. After a period of administration by an acting president, Albert Pratt, Ferdinand von Prondzynski was appointed and continued as president for a full ten-year term, which ended in July 2010. Brian MacCraith was appointed next and was succeeded in 2020 by the current president, Daire Keogh.

== History ==
1980s college logo

1989 logo on creation of university

The institution was created in 1975, on an ad hoc basis, and on 18 June that year Liam Mulcahy was made acting director of the institution, and a day later the first governing body met. Danny O'Hare became director in 1977, and presided over the institution, then based at Mount Street in central Dublin, for the next 22 years. It was intended at the early stage that the institution become the unified structure under which the colleges of what later became Dublin Institute of Technology would unite, but by 1978 it became apparent that this would not be the case and instead an independent institution developed with a distinct identity and mission.

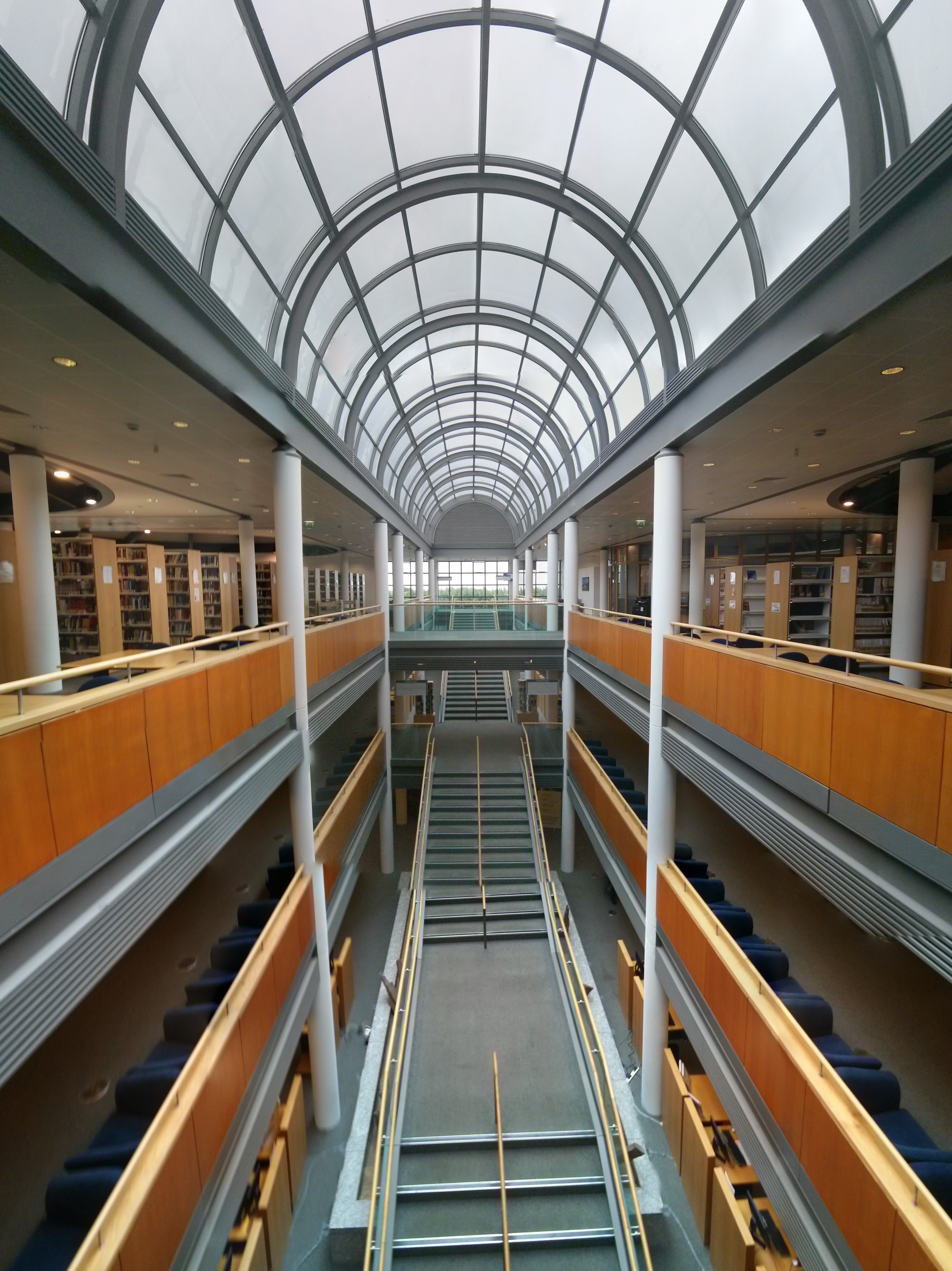
Stairwell of DCU library

In 1979, the institution was located on an 344,000 m^{2} (85 acres) site 5 km (3.1 mi) from the city centre, just north of Dublin City Council's Albert College Park; the Albert College Building and the neighbouring President's Residence, are the only significant buildings remaining from before this period. The Henry Grattan building was the first new building, completed in 1981, along with the adjoining restaurant, and many buildings have been added since, to form the university campus.

In 1986 the International Study Group on Technological Education was set up to examine the future of the National Institute for Higher Education at Dublin and Limerick, and in its report stated that it should be elevated to university status, with naming:

...the NIHE Dublin having the title Dublin City University or the University of Leinster.

Ultimately the title "Dublin City University" was chosen and this was confirmed by the Dublin City University Act of 1989.

The early focus of the institution was, in particular, on science and technology, although it has also had from the start a business school. It later developed a presence also in the performing arts and in the humanities. DCU is also famous for its programme of work placement or INTRA (INtegrated TRAining), which was the first such programme in Ireland.

DCU has been providing Irish and foreign adults with flexible access to higher education for over 35 years. In 1982 the National Distance Education Centre was located at DCU and for many years offered programmes in the traditional "distance education" mode of delivery. It changed to Oscail – DCU Online Education in 2004 to reflect the reality that its programmes were increasingly designed with large elements of online support. In 2013, DCU launched the National Institute for Digital Learning (NIDL) with the Open Education Unit as part of the new institute. This Unit manages online courses and degree programmes offered to Irish residents and students around the world through DCU Connected.

There was a plan in 2002 to base the headquarters of the Irish Academy for the Performing Arts in DCU, but this was later scrapped.

== About ==
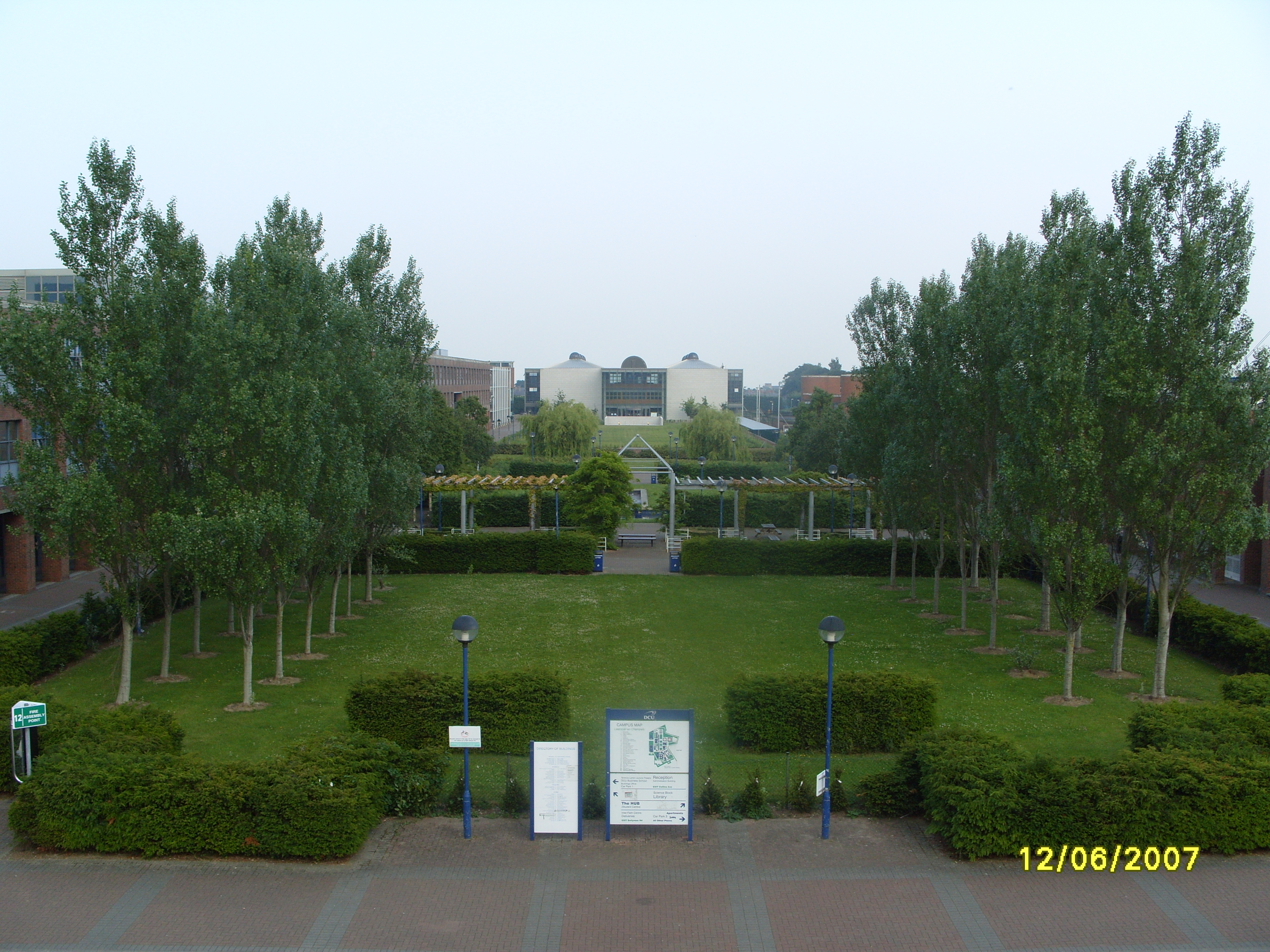
The Central Mall in DCU stretching from the Henry Grattan building to the O'Reilly Library in the background.

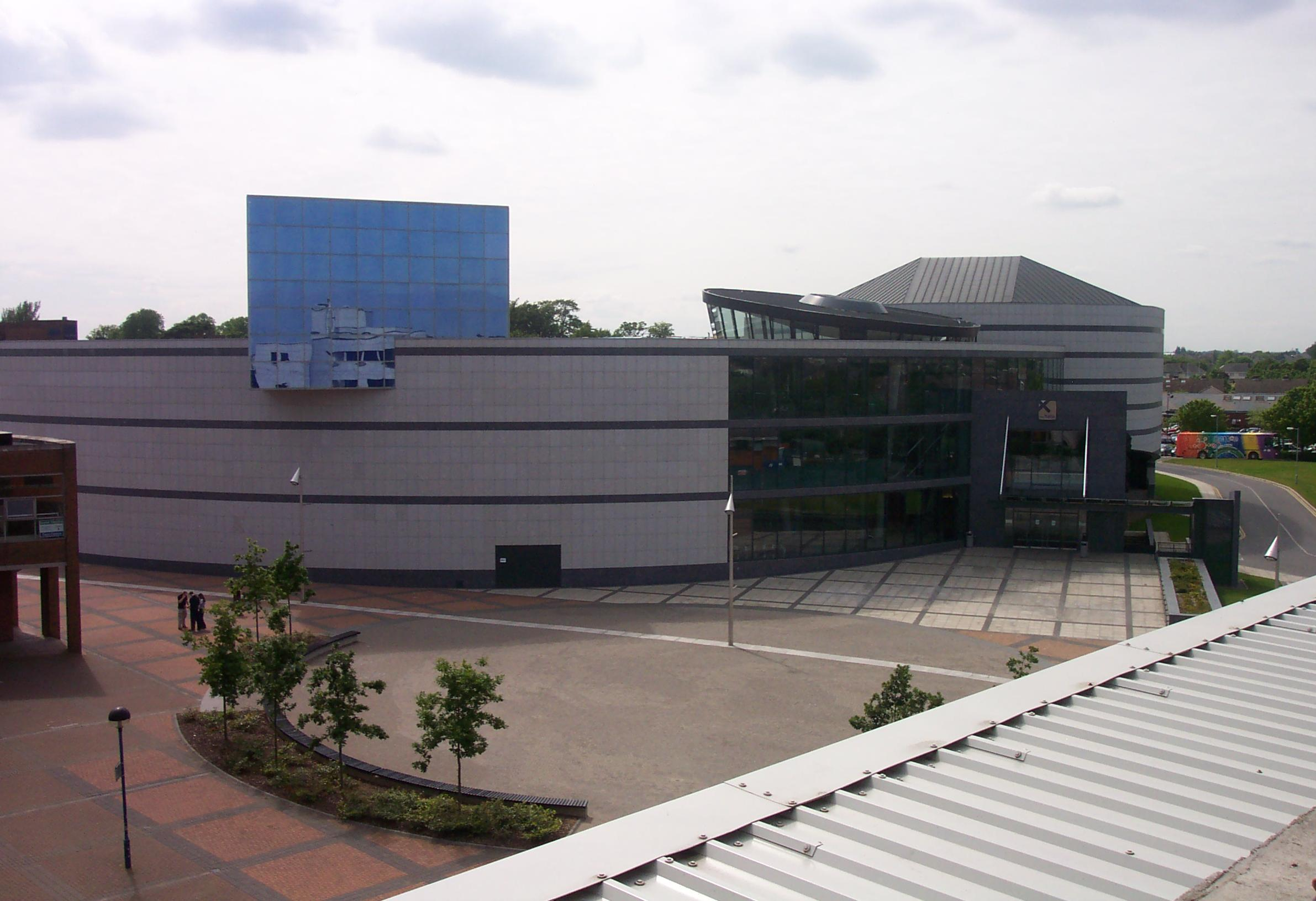
The Helix Theatre

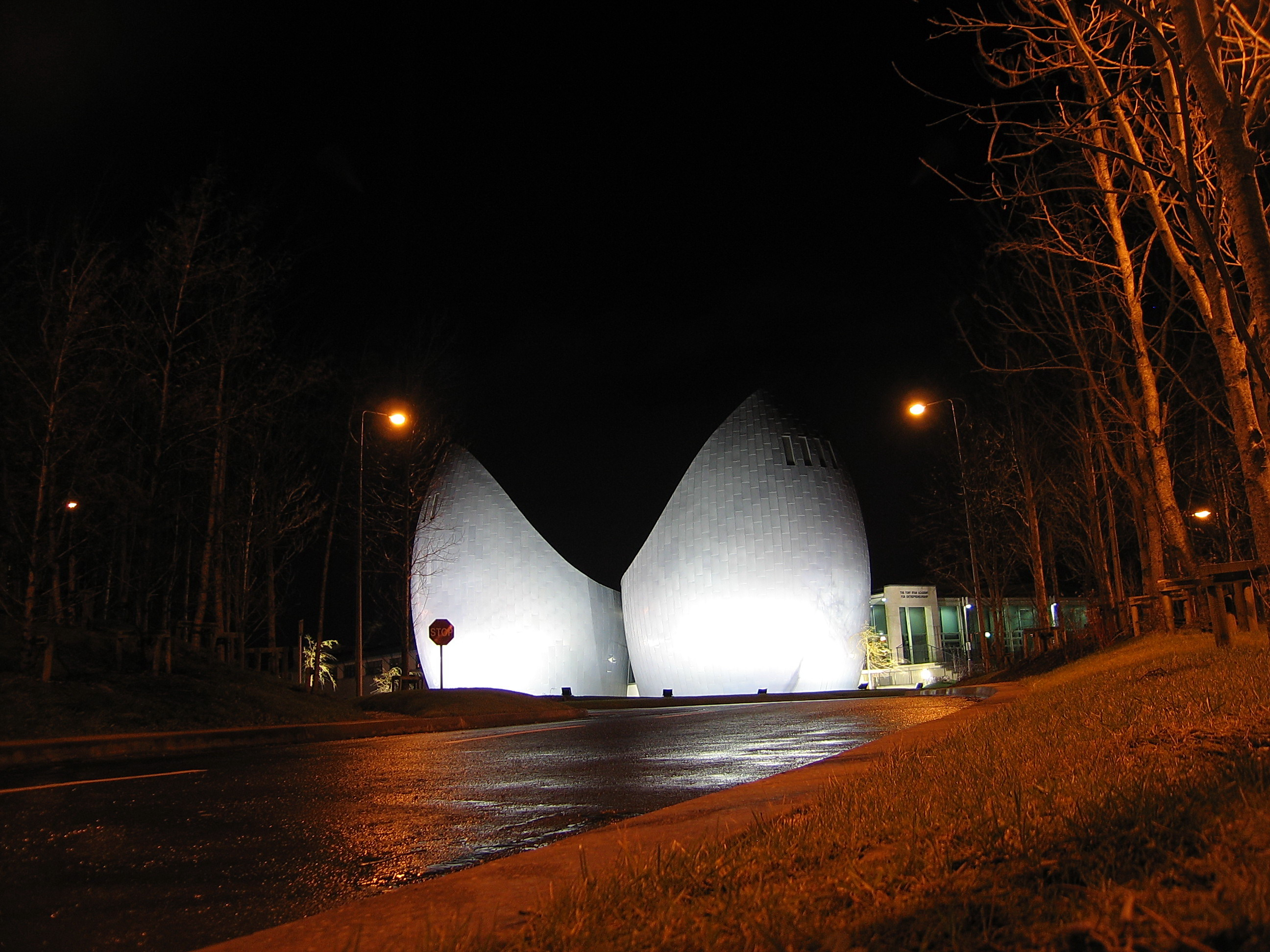
Environmentally friendly "pod" shaped lecture theatres layered with titanium panels at the former Eeolas Institute's DCU Ryan Academy for Entrepreneurship, sole component of the Eeolas Institute, and reopened in 2009 on a standalone basis at CityWest Business Park

=== Campuses ===
The university has five campuses:

- The main campus, usually described as being in Glasnevin but adjacent to Whitehall and Ballymun too
- Sports campus (St Clare's)
- DCU Innovate Hub campus, Glasnevin
- St Patrick's campus in Drumcondra
- All Hallows campus, Drumcondra

==== Main campus ====
The total area of the main campus is approximately 202,000 m^{2} (50 acres) and is bordered by Collins Avenue, Albert College Park, Ballymun Road, Hillside Farm and St. Aidan's School. A further 40,000 m^{2} (9.9 acres) (including Elmhurst House) situated along Griffith Avenue have been acquired. Entrances to the main campus are from Ballymun Road, to the west, and Collins Avenue, to the north.

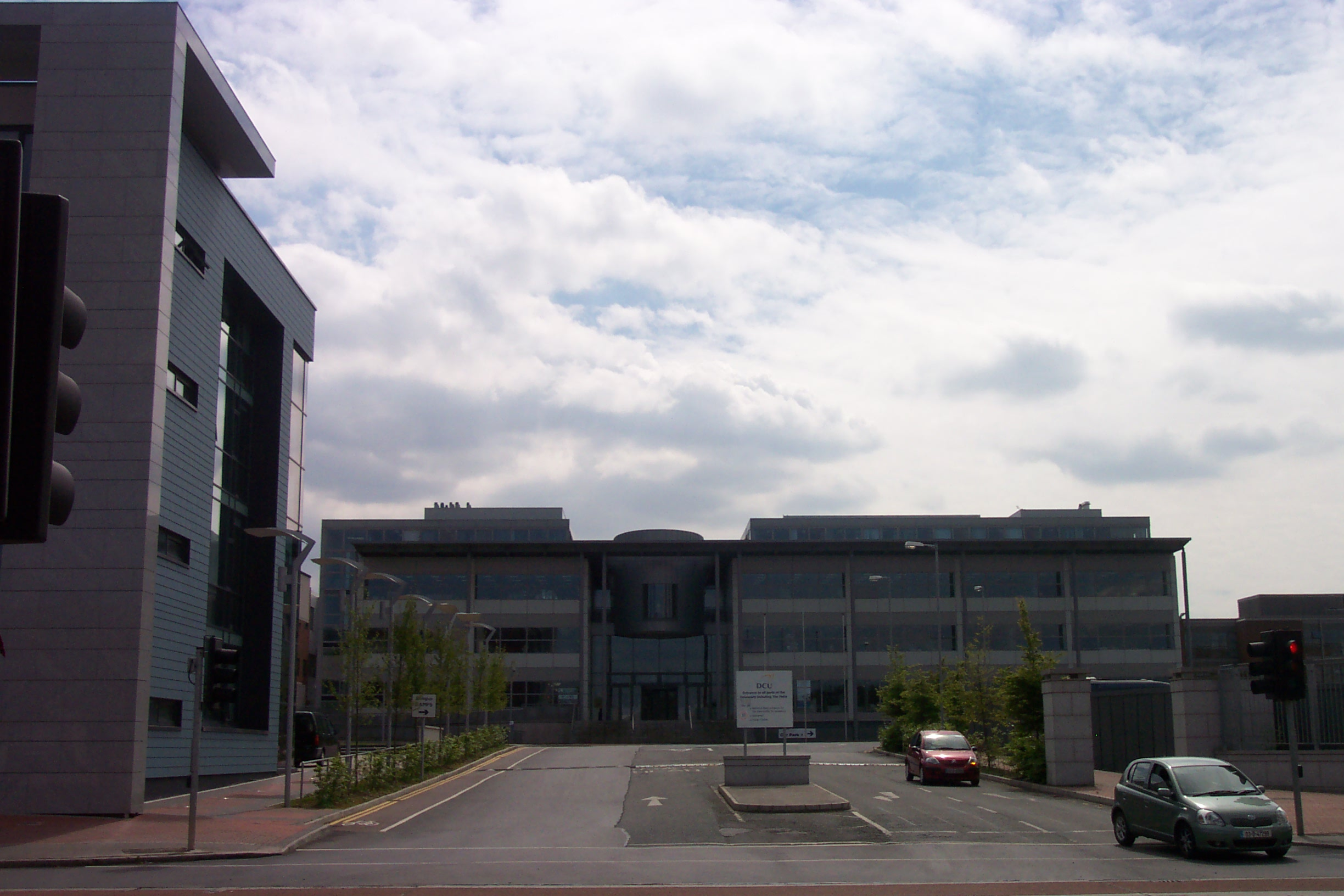
Collins Avenue Entrance

==== St Clare's (Sports) campus ====
There are 142,000 m^{2} (35 acres) at the St Clare's campus on the west side of Ballymun Road; this part of the campus also includes the Sports Pavilion.

==== DCU Innovate Hub campus ====
A 10-acre site with 18,000 sq. m. of buildings, north of central Glasnevin, DCU Innovate Hub is home to 35 companies employing 350 staff who are developing products in connected health, clean energy and Internet of Things (IoT) technology.

==== St Patrick's campus ====
The grounds, including a sports field at the rear, of the former St Patrick's Teaching Training College in central Drumcondra, north of the River Tolka, form a distinct campus. The majority of DCU Institute of Education activities are located on this campus.

==== All Hallow's campus ====
The lands and buildings of the former All Hallows College (including Drumcondra House) on Grace Park Road in residential Drumcondra form another DCU campus. This includes a burial ground. The Church of Ireland Centre, overseeing the religious elements of the fully merged former Church of Ireland College of Education (whose old site was not bought by DCU), is also based at this campus.

=== Faculties and Schools ===
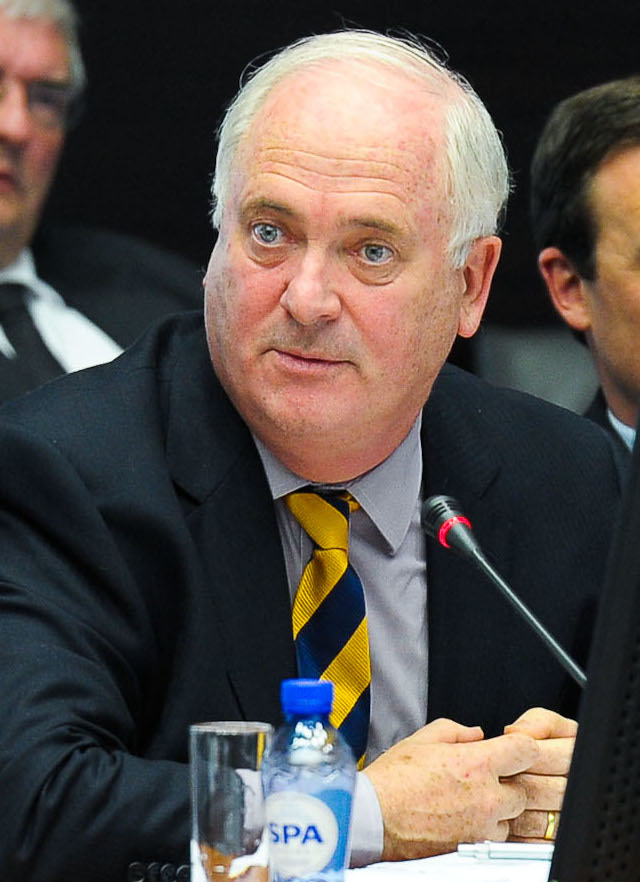
Former Taoiseach John Bruton, DCU faculty member

DCU Business School

Faculty of Engineering & Computing

- School of Computing
- School of Electronic Engineering
- School of Mechanical and Manufacturing Engineering

Faculty of Humanities & Social Sciences

- School of Applied Language & Intercultural Studies (SALIS)
- School of Communications
- School of Law & Government
- School of English
- School of History and Geography
- School of Theology, Philosophy, and Music
- Fiontar & Scoil na Gaeilge

DCU Institute of Education

- School of Arts Education & Movement
- School of Human Development
- School of Inclusive & Special Education
- School of Language, Literacy & Early Childhood Education
- School of Policy & Practice
- School of STEM Education, Innovation & Global Studies

Faculty of Science & Health

- School of Biotechnology
- School of Chemical Sciences
- School of Health & Human Performance
- School of Mathematical Sciences
- School of Nursing, Psychotherapy and Community Health
- School of Physical Sciences
- School of Psychology

DCU Connected – Online Education

=== Facilities ===
DCU has teaching and research facilities, including television and sound studios, computer laboratories and networking facilities, language and interpreting laboratories, a video-conferencing suite, and print and graphical laboratories. These are in addition to research and teaching laboratories in the areas of physics, chemistry, biology and engineering.

The primary arts facility is The Helix performing arts centre.

There is an InterFaith Centre located on the campus, a crèche, a medical centre, a Counselling Service, and a Disability Service. There was also a commercial VHI Swiftcare Clinic, that closed in 2011.

Other social facilities include The Venue (Student Arts Theatre, also known as omega [Ω], capacity: 1,000), a Ticketmaster outlet, a "Digital Café", club and society meeting and seminar rooms, two Starbucks cafés, one at the main restaurant (the first in Ireland) and one in the Sports Building, three pool rooms, and a "Glass Room" for band practice.

Retail facilities include six restaurants and two bars, a Londis store, pharmacy, barber shop, Students' Union Shop, Bank of Ireland, Xerox reprographic centre, Hodges Figgis bookshop, and a beauty salon in the sports centre.

=== Culture and arts ===
The Centre for Talented Youth and The Helix a purpose-built performance space, which includes Ireland's largest concert hall, the Mahony Hall, are both part of the university.

DCU also has a campus radio station called DCUfm.

An Arts Committee was established in 1983 and has since acquired more than 300 works of art, including paintings, tapestries and sculptures, for the university. The collection includes works by artists such as Louis le Brocquy, Cecil King, Patrick Scott, Michael Warren, Stephen Lawlor, Brian Bourke, Victor Sloan, Barrie Cooke and William Crozier.

=== Entrepreneurship ===
Dublin City University has a large number of graduate entrepreneurs and these form part of the DCU Alumni Entrepreneur Network which is run by the Alumni Office. Invent, the commercialisation gateway of DCU, is home to the Entrepreneurs' Organisation. It also hosts the Irish arm of the US-based National Foundation for Teaching Entrepreneurship (NFTE), which helps young people from poorer backgrounds to build skills and unlock creativity. The DCU Ryan Academy, established during the presidency of Ferdinand von Prondzynski and funded by the family of the late entrepreneur Dr Tony Ryan, promotes entrepreneurship and innovation, delivering short courses on a wide range of topics from Social Enterprise Development to Foresight and Future Trends. As well as for-profit entrepreneurship the academy also works in the area of social entrepreneurship and social enterprise.

=== Registration and application ===
Most undergraduates enter DCU through the Irish Central Applications Office process. The university is also party to an agreement with the Postgraduate Applications Centre in Galway.

=== Corporate identity ===
The university's current corporate identity dates from 2001 when the new president, Ferdinand von Prondzynski, decided to rebrand the identity as he considered the previous "three castles" logo to be out of date and not representative of the university's vision as a modern and networked research university.

=== Rankings ===
Rankings
Global rankings
- ARWU (2026): 901−1000
- QS (2027): =408
- THE (2026): =284

The university was named Irish University of the Year 2004-2005 by the Sunday Times, UK. It was also ranked second in the league table of Irish universities in the same newspaper that year, and fourth in the two subsequent league tables. The university was one of three establishments of higher education in Ireland which are ranked amongst the top 300 universities worldwide by the Times Higher Education Supplement in 2007–2008. The university was named "Irish University of the Year" by the Sunday Times newspaper once again for the 2010–2011 academic year.

The university has been named numerous times as one of the world's top 50 universities that are under 50 years old, by the QS World University Rankings list. DCU's QS World University ranking is 408th for 2027.

== Organisation ==
=== Governance ===
In accordance with legislation, the university is directed by a policy-making statutory Governing Body, whose functions are outlined in the National Institute for Higher Education, Dublin, Act, 1980, amended in the Dublin City University Act, 1989 which raised the institution's status to that of a university and provided for related matters. There are several other important acts concerning the college including the Universities Act, 1997, which allows for the creation of University Statutes.

The Governing Body's 31 members are chosen by a wide range of groups and authorities, and include members elected by staff (in various classes) and students (ex-officio based on elections of Students Union officers). Graduates can directly elect one member and one further graduate member is put forward by the Educational Trust.

=== Chancellors ===
The university is headed, titularly, by the Chancellor. As of 2020, the Chancellor of Dublin City University is Martin McAleese (2011–2016, 2016–2021), who was preceded by Ireland's former EU Commissioner and Attorney General, David Byrne (2006–2011). Byrne was in turn preceded by the Hon Ms Justice Mella Carroll (2001–2006) who in turn was preceded by Tom Hardiman (–2001).

=== Academic governance ===
A statutory Academic Council, with three standing committees, oversees the teaching and research work of the university. The three permanent sub-committees, which replaced a single Standing Committee, are the Education Committee, the University Standards Committee and the Graduate Research Studies Board.

=== Academic structure ===
The academic organisation of the university is arranged into faculties and schools. DCU has recently undergone some reorganisation on the faculty level, with an incorporation process establishing one of Europe's largest Institutes of Education. There are currently five faculties, each headed by an Executive Dean. Below this level are Schools, each with its own Head, and for each degree programme, a Programme Board, with an elected chairperson.

Since 2017, academic staff are assigned titles as Assistant Professor (formerly Lecturer), Associate Professor (formerly Senior Lecturer), Professor (formerly associate professor) and Full Professor.

DCU houses the country's first purpose-built university nursing school.

With a legacy in distance learning, DCU provides a variety of undergraduate and postgraduate online courses and degree programs via DCU Connected. It is also home to the National Institute for Digital Learning (NIDL), which strived to be a global leader in the innovation, execution, and assessment of modern digital, blended, and online learning models. Additionally, NIDL oversees the creation and delivery of an expanding selection of free online courses, known as MOOCs, through Ireland’s Open Learning Academy.

DCU is also the location for all professional Actuarial exams in Ireland. It also has a Prometric Test Centre and is the test centre for Ireland's Graduate Management Admission Test.

DCU awards degrees in Business Studies and International Finance and Marketing, Innovation and Technology in Riyadh, Saudi Arabia, in partnership with Princess Nora bint Abdul Rahman University.

=== Libraries ===
DCU library is a deposit library, making it legally entitled to a copy of every book published in Ireland. It is a member of the IReL (Irish Research E-Library) consortium, allowing staff and students full access to over 100 online academic databases.

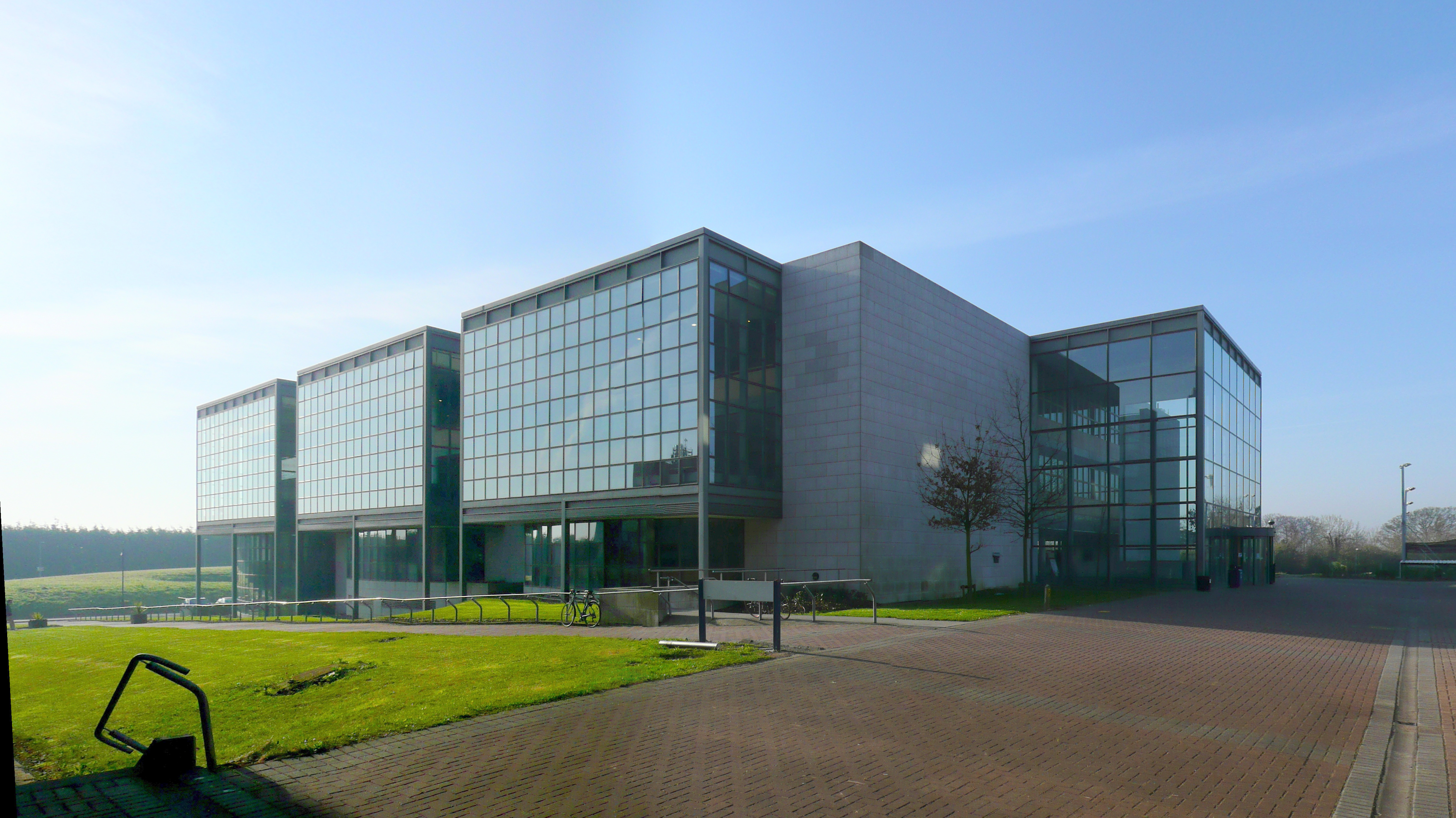
Exterior of The John and Aileen O'Reilly Library on the Glasnevin campus

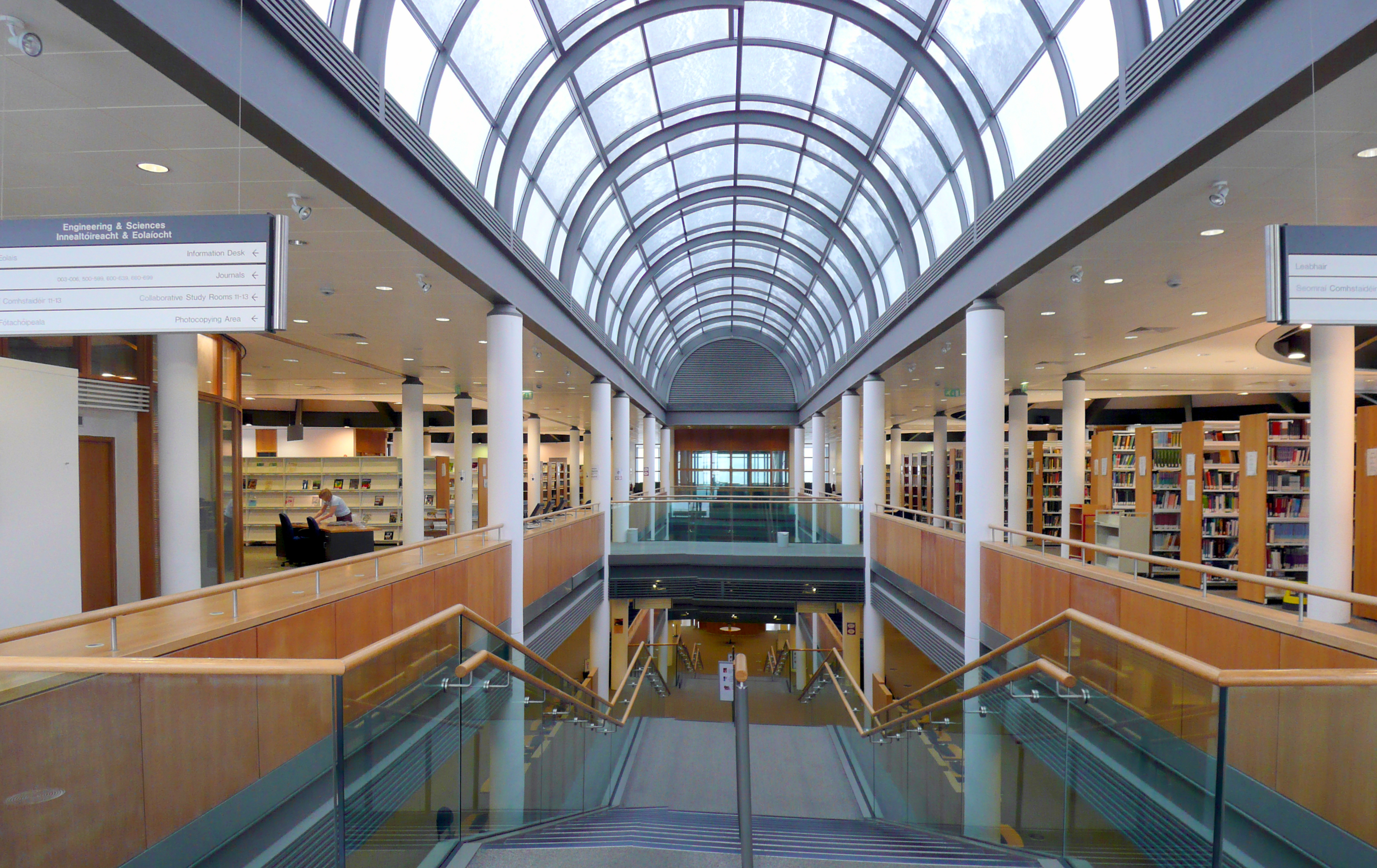
Interior of The John and Aileen O'Reilly Library on the Glasnevin campus

The John and Aileen O'Reilly Library building on the Glasnevin Campus opened in 2002, replacing a facility in the original NIHE building, with funding from the O'Reilly Foundation and Atlantic Philanthropies. The building was designed by Scott Tallon Walker and received the SCONUL Library Design Award. The building also hosts the university's maths learning centre and writing centre.

The Cregan Library on the Saint Patrick's campus opened in 2015, costing €50 million, replacing previous facilities nearby.

In November 2008, DCU Library launched DORAS, an open access institutional repository, to promote the university's research by providing free online access to DCU's research publications and theses.

In 2009, the library received the private papers of Charles Haughey, a former Taoiseach.

=== Employment law controversies ===
Dublin City University has experienced some controversy and litigation. Controversy began over the wording and adoption of new university statutes on suspension and dismissal of staff by the Governing Authority, on the recommendation of the president, as required by the Universities Act 1997. In 2002, the Labour Court recommended that this statute be rewritten and this has been followed by long-running negotiations between the university and the trade union representing staff, SIPTU; In 2008 a vote organised by SIPTU led to a majority (of the admittedly very small number of staff who voted) declaring no confidence in the management of the university in its conduct of these negotiations.

In 2002, a Rights Commissioner recommended the reinstatement of a tenured lecturer following the university's decision to treat his contract as having been repudiated. An appeal from the Rights Commissioner's recommendation by the university commenced at the Employment Appeals Tribunal in July 2009 and continued in December 2009 and January 2010. During the hearing in 2009 there was significant emphasis on statements made by the lecturer in his blog throughout 2009, which were deemed by the President, Professor Ferdinand von Prondzynski, and others to be highly defamatory. In a final decision, the lecturer was refused reinstatement but given modest financial compensation.

A second case related to accusations of gender discrimination against a senior female member of academic staff, and was won by the academic on appeal at the Labour Court.

Litigation also arose following the purported termination by the university of the appointment of an associate professor in 2006, after he had indicated he was moving to another university, while refusing to confirm the timing of his move. The High Court ruled against DCU on three grounds, and the case was appealed by the university; this led to a 2009 Supreme Court hearing in December 2009, with DCU losing on procedural grounds. The president, Professor von Prondzynski, at the time deferred elections to the university Executive when it involved the candidacy of the purported dismissed academic, commenting that he could not see how the professor could become a member of the Executive advising him, but at the same time he stressed his openness to a range of views.

== DCU Educational Trust ==
The university is supported by a charitable Trust, named the "DCU Educational Trust", the main work of which is in fund-raising.

== Student body ==
The composition of the student body represents every county on the island of Ireland and over seventy countries worldwide, spread across all six continents. The university has educated students from Australia to Brazil and Japan to Iceland. International students currently make up just over 15% of the full-time student body. The university is strongly committed to international education and internationalising its campus. Apart from a large number of exchanges the university also welcomes international students as part of its Study Abroad Programme and offers programmes jointly with institutions based outside Ireland and is rapidly expanding a wide range of international activities.

== Student activities ==
=== Clubs and societies ===
There are more than 140 clubs and societies representing a wide range of interests such as culture, computer games, sport, and academic interests.

=== Governing Committees ===
Societies and Clubs receive financial support from a proportion of capitation fees and are governed solely by student committees. The Society Life Committee (SLC) and The Club Life Committee (CLC) govern and drive policy and funding for societies and clubs at DCU. Student facilities for societies are mostly based in the Student Centre, The U, which was opened in September 2018.

=== Drama ===
DCU's Drama Society hosts many productions for the public every year, including its annual flagship event, the DCU Musical. In 2009, the musical Rent, was nominated for the Best Overall Show award, and the Best Director award with the Association of Irish Musical Societies. DCU Drama reprised RENT at Dublin's Olympia Theatre. from 15 to 20 June 2009. DCU Drama also sends plays to be adjudicated for the Irish Student Drama Association awards. DCU Drama won the Best National College Society award at the Board of Irish College Societies awards in 2002, 2003 and 2008, and was nominated for Best Society Event nationwide for The Full Monty in 2007 and Rent in 2009. DCU Drama won Best Society at DCU in 2017 and most recently performed the musical Sweeney Todd in Spring of 2018.

=== Music ===
As one of DCU's biggest and most active societies, Music Society organises lessons, workshops, concerts, open mic nights, trips to concerts, weekends away, an intervarsity Battle of the Bands and a myriad of other events every year. The Battle of the Bands is its main event, with participants coming from colleges nationwide. The 2010 Battle of the Bands took place on 29 March in DCU. Music Society won the award for Best Society in DCU in 2007.

=== Politics ===
Ireland's major political parties are represented on campus. In the 2012–2013 academic year, the Fianna Fáil party was the largest political party on campus and was chaired by Ruadhrí Moran. The Labour Party, who were traditionally the largest on-campus, have fallen into second place, with the Fine Gael party, chaired by Ryan Hunt in third with a drop in 30% of membership.

=== Media ===
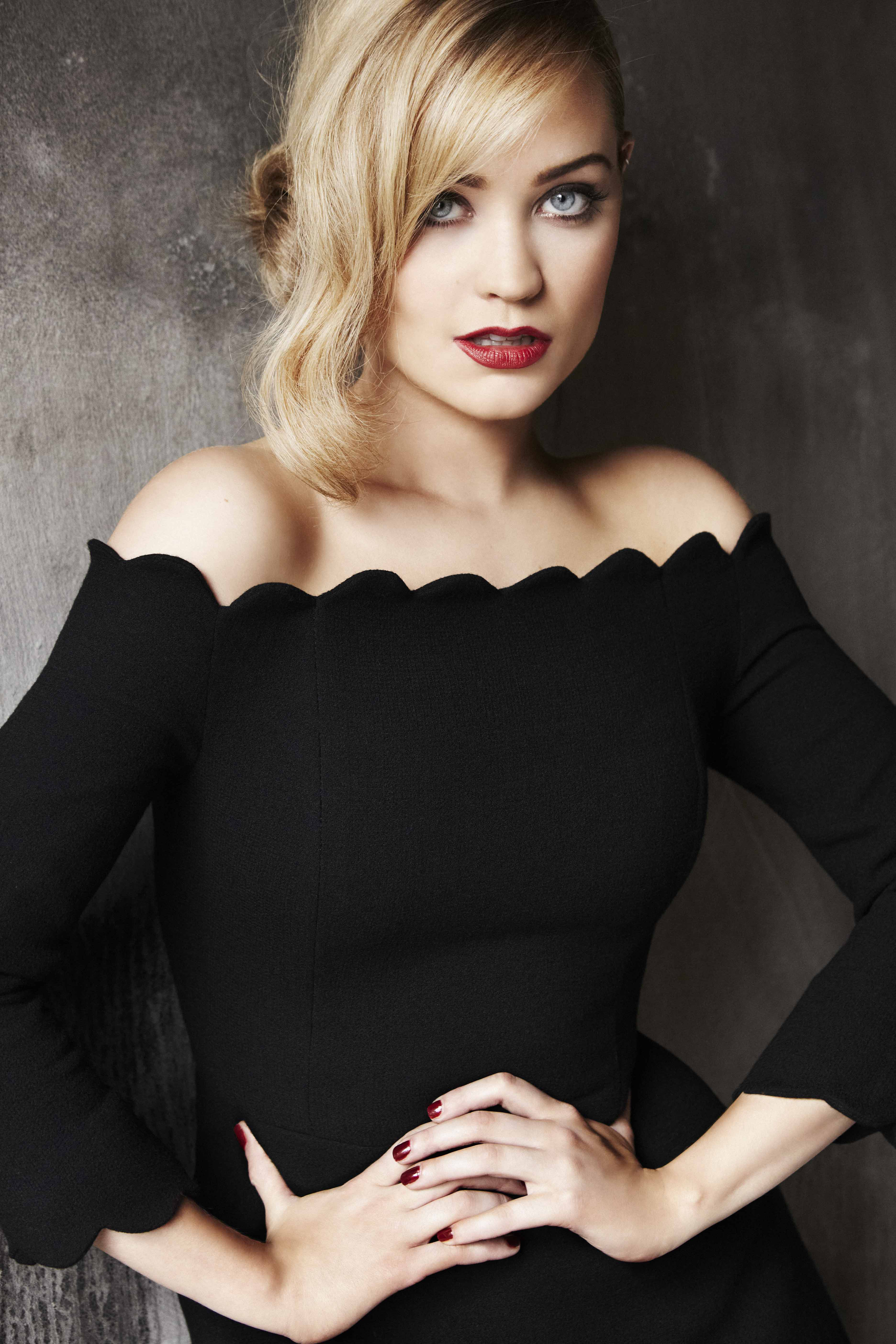
Broadcaster and DCU graduate Laura Whitmore

==== Radio ====
DCUfm is a student-run radio station. The station airs regular programmes from 09:00AM to 9:00PM, every week during both semesters. It streams its output from their Twitch page DCUFM. Its programmes cover arts, music, news, sport, and the Irish language.

DCUfm is a project of the Media Production Society (MPS) at DCU, which is Dublin City University’s society of the year 2023/2024. The society also won the national 'most improved society' prize and the 'best online presence' award at the BICS in 2010 and 2012 respectively. MPS won the title of DCU's best society at the 2011 and 2013 DCU Society Awards and won DCU's best society event in 2014 with the 24 Hour Broadcast.

The station is managed by two FM Managers. The 2024/2025 academic year sees Eoin O’Sullivan and Lauren Joyce as managers. Every year, DCUfm takes in up to 120 new members and provides them with training, guidance and support in teaching them how to work in radio. The station uses the industry-standard suite of on-air radio automation software, which is also used by the major national commercial radio stations.

DCUfm has achieved national recognition for its news and sport output. Its flagship shows are Newswire, “Limelight” and Action Replay, while additional programming is introduced for special events such as national budgets, or DCU SU and Dáil elections. Its interviews with former Taoiseach Bertie Ahern, in which he insisted his economic management was largely correct, and British National Party leader Nick Griffin were among those to receive national coverage. Newswire won the National Student Media Award for best news and current affairs radio programme for the fourth year in a row in April 2013. Action Replay was crowned best arts and features show at the 2011 awards.

The station won two awards in 2010, four in 2011 (including two for DCUfm.com), four in 2012, and two in 2013. The station has been successful at the annual DCU Hybrid Awards, and the DCUfm website also won the national college society website of the year prize at the national Board of Irish College Societies Awards (BICS) in 2010.

==== Television ====
DCU TV is also operated by DCU's Media Production Society (MPS).

It produces videos and programmes which are available online through the MPS YouTube channel and the DCU TV Instagram. Its content often goes viral in Ireland and as a result has been promoted by some of the country's major websites and news outlets.

DCU TV is composed of "The TV Team" which is organised into sections, such as Feature Length Content and Sketches. The TV Team also produces DCU TV News, a weekly news series in collaboration with Dublin City University. They produce high quality, solely student created content. Most recently, they won an award for "Best Promotional Video" at the DCU Clubs and Socs Awards.

DCU TV's major annual event is The 24-Hour Broadcast, which has raised as much as €13,000 for charity in one broadcast. the 24-Hour Broadcast is formatted with 48 live shows, with the final 2 hours being a ticketed live-studio audience in the Venue, on the Glasnevin Campus.

DCU TV often provides photography, videography and livestreaming to other DCU Societies, such as the Raising and Giving Society, DCU Dance, and DCU Drama. They also work with DCU to provide the livestream for the DCU Graduation Ceremonies.

DCU is the first university in Ireland to produce a feature-length film. The film, named Six Semesters, was funded by the university and made entirely by MPS members.

The TV Team, The 24-Hour Broadcast and DCU TV as a whole is managed by two TV managers, elected each year at the MPS Annual General Meeting. The 2024/2025 TV Managers are currently Samuel Kennedy and Sarah Duff.

=== Publications ===
There are several publications distributed throughout the university, and below are current and past examples:

- Campus (defunct) – Official DCUSU Magazine
- The College View – Student Newspaper
- Flashback – An end-of-semester review magazine for DCU, St. Patrick's and Mater Dei
- The Look – A fashion supplement included with The College View
- An Tarbh (defunct) – DCU student union weekly news and views magazine
- The Bullsheet (defunct) – DCU journalism students news and satirical newspaper
- DCU Book Society anthology – A yearly collection of short stories and poems by DCU students
- Flux

There is also a magazine for staff and alumni:

- DCU TIMES – University magazine

== Facilities ==
=== Accommodation ===
The university has built several modern apartments and residences. Larkfield Apartments have 128 units, each with two study bedrooms and a shared living, kitchen and dining area within each unit. The Postgraduate Residences have 37 apartments, each with two, three or four en-suite bedrooms. The Hampstead Apartments consist of 61 units, each with three or five en-suite bedrooms and a shared living, kitchen and dining area. The College Park Apartments consist of 93 units, each with four or five en-suite bedrooms and a shared living, kitchen and dining area.

All Hallows is situated in Drumcondra village within reach of the Glasnevin and St. Patrick's campuses. There are 63 bedrooms available in Purcell House to students. Accommodation is in single or double bedrooms (single occupancy only) with either ensuite or shared bathroom facilities. Each bedroom has a study area and fixed-line internet access (internet cable is not provided). There is a communal kitchen and shared lounge areas.

=== Sport ===
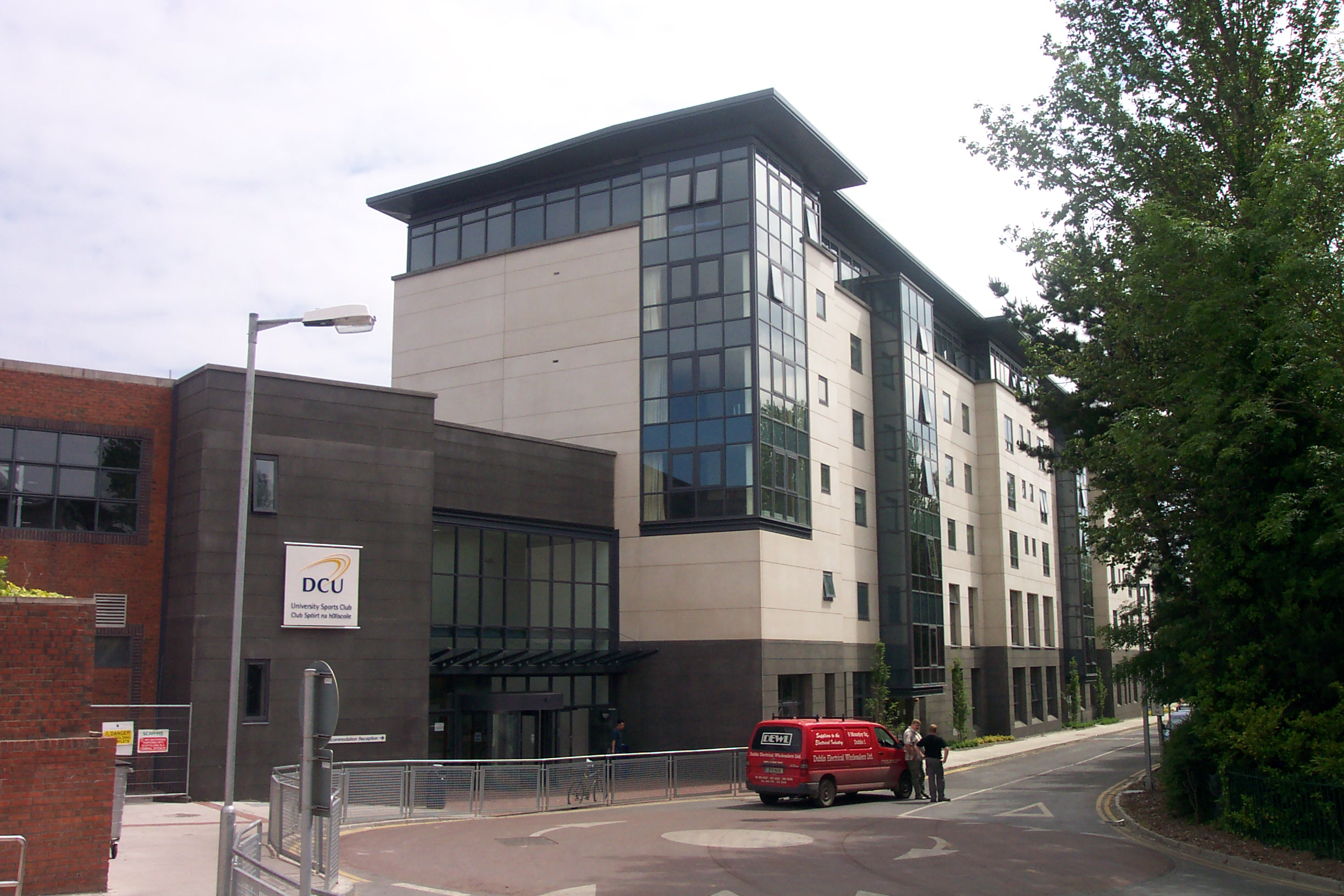
University Sports Complex

Sports facilities at DCU broadly span across four locations; the Glasnevin Campus Sports Complex, the St. Patrick’s Campus Sports Complex, Morton Stadium, and DCU Sports Grounds.

There are ten tennis courts at the National Tennis Training Centre in Albert College Park (four indoor acrylic courts, three outdoor hardcourts and three outdoor clay courts) and a further five tennis courts are situated at Glasnevin Lawn Tennis Club adjacent to St. Clare's Sports Grounds. There is also a GAA pitch, a grass athletics track and four or six soccer pitches (depending on configuration) in Albert College Park.

The DCU Sports Academy was launched in November 2006. Membership of the Sports Academy entitles those selected to special scholarships and supports worth up to €10,000 each including on-campus accommodation, financial support towards college books and tuition fees, personal tuition, access to key national and international competitions, physiotherapy and massage, sports nutrition advice and high-performance education talks and workshops.

==== Glasnevin Campus Sports Complex ====
Also known as the DCU Sports Complex, the sports complex opened in January 2005. The complex won the "Sports centre of the Year Award" in 2009. Sports facilities on the campus include a sports complex and fitness centre which incorporates: an aerobics studio, spinning studio, quiet studio, four sports halls, two squash courts, a glass-backed Gaelic handball/racquetball court, a gallery that accommodates table tennis and a body conditioning arena, a floodlit astroturf hockey pitch and seven grass pitches for a variety of sports, eight enclosed five-a-side AstroTurf soccer pitches, an indoor climbing wall, a four-lane 75-metre indoor sprint track and a gym. per week. The main sports hall can be divided into three full-size volleyball, badminton or basketball courts.

==== St. Clare's Sports Grounds ====
Also known as the DCU Sports Grounds, and formerly known as the DCU Sports Campus, this 35-acre site on the Ballymun Road was redeveloped in 2014 and houses facilities for GAA, track and field, rugby and soccer.

The Sports Grounds have a full-size, artificial turf GAA pitch with floodlights, four full-sized grass pitches and a gym. Other onsite facilities also include a 60m 5-lane sprint track, a cross-country track, a long jump sand pit, a high jump landing area and a practice hammer throw cage. The Pavilion building houses the team changing rooms.

=== Other ===
There are three licensed premises on the campus, which sell alcohol and food; the "old bar", the "nu bar" (aka beta [β]), The Helix and Spar (off-licence). However, in early 2007 Spar stopped selling any alcoholic products indefinitely, and it remains to be seen whether or not they will renew their licence in the future. Prior to this, there were four licensed premises, but this itself followed a long period with only one licensed location, and up until 1992, there were no such premises on campus at all.

There are several restaurants and cafes; the Main Restaurant and the first Starbucks café (in Ireland) are located in the Pavilion building. Zero-1 is located in the basement of the O'Reilly Library. The Invent Centre, The Helix, Nursing School and Business School each have their own cafés. The 1838 Club is a restaurant for academic staff and postgraduate research students, it is located in the Albert College Building. There is a second Starbucks in the Sports Complex, the third in Ireland after Microsoft Ireland. There is also a digital cafe and Xbox gaming arena above the main restaurant, The Mezzanine. In 2009 the Mezzanine was in the process of relocation to the seminar room in DCU's student centre 'The Hub'

DCU Language Services offers English Language Training to a large number of international students each year. DCU LS also offers professional translation services in over 70 languages in addition to language assessments for recruitment, proofreading and transcription services. DCU LS is an IELTS exam centre.

DCU has recently acquired additional lands adjacent to its main campus, which will be developed to add to the university's sports facilities.

In 2008, DCU planned to build a 10,000-seat indoor stadium and running track at its Sports Grounds.

== Strategy ==
Shortly after the appointment in 2000 of the then-new president, Ferdinand von Prondzynski, DCU adopted what was described as a highly innovative strategic plan, 'Leading Change'. For a university strategy, it was a very short document, but it set out a number of major developments and innovations. Chief amongst these was the adoption of academic strategic 'Themes', which were to govern the development of the university. Each Theme was to have a 'Theme Leader'. The academic Themes are interdisciplinary and focus on areas in which DCU has growing leadership. This strategic framework was extended in the 2005 strategic plan, 'Leadership through Foresight', in which DCU also committed itself to eight key clusters of actions to develop its leading role in its chosen priority areas. Following an announcement by the HEA in August 2007, DCU received over €23m in research funding under Phase 2 of PRTLI Cycle 4.

Following an announcement by the Science Foundation Ireland in November 2007, DCU received over €16.8m in research funding for localisation research for a €30.4m "Next Generation Localisation" project headed by Prof. Josef Van Genabith (with international and domestic industry partners contributing the remaining €13.6m).

== Research ==
Coordinated by the Office of the Vice President for Research, there are three constituent units which support the research of academics, research students and collaborative partners: Research Support Services, Graduate School, and DCU.

=== Collaboration and academic associations ===
Under its strategic plan, 'Leadership through Foresight' (2005), DCU committed itself to collaboration with national and international organisations and universities on technology and research projects.

The AIC Adaptive Information Cluster with University College Dublin is one such initiative has been based on computer and sensor technology to develop advanced applications in several areas. DCU and UCD also collaborate on a health research board-funded programme of nursing decision-making in Ireland, the first research programme in nursing in Ireland. The two universities also collaborate on the Odysseus undergraduate Computer Science Internship Programme and on the Clarity Centre for Sensor Web Technologies.

The Centre for Innovation and Structural Change with National University of Ireland, Galway and University College Dublin is an initiative to better utilise and develop international-level research.

The School for Policy and Practice through its civic engagement programme participates in the local development coalition for North Dublin, NorDubCo, established in 1996 by DCU together with Fingal County Council and Dublin Corporation.

Lero, the Irish Software Engineering Research Centre with the University of Limerick, University College Dublin and Trinity College Dublin is a partnership to bring together and focus software engineering in Ireland.

The university also collaborates with the National University of Ireland, Galway and the pharmaceutical multinational Bristol Myers Squibb on biopharmaceutical research. The National Institute for Cellular Biotechnology at DCU and Wyeth Pharmaceutical have recently announced a research collaboration in the production of biopharmaceuticals.

DCU also collaborates with the National Institute for Bioprocessing, Research and Training (NIBRT) its main partners are UCD, TCD and Sligo IT. The university has a strategic alliance with Cornell University's Nanobiotechnology Centre (NBTC).

The National Centre for Sensor Research collaborates with the Royal College of Surgeons in Ireland on Biomedical Diagnostics research. The NCSR also collaborates with University College Cork, National University of Ireland, Galway, University of Wollongong, Australia, Georgia Institute of Technology, Atlanta and the Irish Marine Institute. DCU is also collaborating with Trinity College Dublin and University College Dublin to run the National Digital Research Centre.

Plasma and Vacuum Technology with Queen's University Belfast is a cross-border programme to deliver online courses in plasma and vacuum technology without attending university-based lectures. Another cross-border initiative DCU is working with is the Centre for Cross Border Studies which researches and develops cooperation across the Irish border in education, training, health, business, public administration, communications, agriculture and the environment.

The Programme for Research on Grid-enabled Computational Physics of Natural Phenomena is a wide partnership with Dublin Institute for Advanced Studies, National University of Ireland, Galway, University College Dublin, HEAnet, Met Éireann, Armagh Observatory and Grid Ireland. Development of research under the PRTLI Cycle 1 funded Institute for Advanced Materials Science, additional funding is now being sought to further research in the area of nanomaterials and nanotechnology with Trinity College Dublin.

The university also collaborates with the Centre for Telecommunications Value-Chain-Driven Research (CTVR) and with Bell Labs Research Ireland (BLRI). The National Centre for Sensor Research also collaborates with the National Botanic Gardens on the Eco-Sensor Network project. DCU is also a participant in the Irish Centre for High-End Computing.

DCU leads Ireland in fusion power research, with a team of 33 DCU scientists taking part in a €10 billion global collaboration to make a breakthrough creating safe nuclear energy by fusion.

The experimental ITER (International Thermonuclear Experimental Reactor) power station will be built at Cadarache in the South of France and is the result of an international collaboration involving the European Union (represented by EURATOM), Japan, China, India, the Republic of Korea, Russia and the United States. Dublin City University is the lead partner in this Irish research through Irish Fusion Association under the National Centre for Plasma Science and Technology with 10 more University College Cork scientists taking part in the project as well under the auspices of Association Euratom DCU, which was established in 1996. The Association's annual budget is about €2.5 million with 30 per cent of this funded directly by the European Commission. Further funding is provided by DCU and Science Foundation Ireland.

The university also has agreements with organisations and universities outside Ireland. For instance, the University at Buffalo is a partnership to develop research in the eastern United States. is a continuing project with the University of Wales, Lampeter to develop an Irish language terminology database online. The Catholic University of Lublin has a partnership with the university to deliver and accredit a Master of Business Administration in Poland. The university collaborates with universities in eleven European countries for the AIM media project. DCU has recently announced an alliance with Arizona State University. The two universities will develop links in a number of areas, including joint research projects, joint entrepreneurial initiatives, institutional learning projects and benchmarking of internal operations, as well as inter-institutional faculty, student and staff transfers between the universities.

The School of Computing collaborates on research with large multinational corporations and institutions like Google, Microsoft, the US Military, IBM, Samsung and Xerox. There is also an annual prize sponsored by Ericsson for the leading final year Electronic Engineering project.

Research centres in DCU also collaborate with each other on multidisciplinary projects. For example, the Materials Processing Research Centre collaborates with the Vascular Health Research Centre on research aimed at producing synthetic bone and soft tissue such as arteries.

The university also hosts many public events such as monthly lectures in the areas of physics and astronomy in collaboration with Astronomy Ireland, held in "The Venue" complex in The Hub (DCU Student Centre), Irish Inventor Association seminars held at the Invent Centre, the Gay Rugby World Cup and even an exhibition of rare 2500-year-old Shakyamuni Buddha relics at the University Interfaith Centre.

Hospitals linked with DCU for teaching and research purposes include:

- Beaumont Hospital
- Mater Misericordiae University Hospital, Dublin
- St. Vincent's Hospital, Fairview
- St. James's Hospital, Dublin
- Temple Street Children's University Hospital
- Bon Secours Hospital, Glasnevin
- St. Ita's Hospital, Portrane
- St. Joseph's Hospital, Clonsilla

== See also ==
- List of Dublin City University people
- List of universities in the Republic of Ireland
- Education in the Republic of Ireland
