= Brian MacCraith =

Irish physicist, President of Dublin City University (2010–2020)

Brian MacCraith MRIA HonFInstP
- Born: 1957 (age 68–69); Dundalk, Ireland
- Education: NUI Galway
- Known for: Presidency of DCU, chairing of Ireland's COVID-19 vaccine taskforce
- Spouse: Catherine MacCraith
- Children: 2
- Scientific career
- Fields: Physics; Sensors
- Workplaces: Dundalk Institute of Technology; Dublin City University (DCU)

Brian Dominic MacCraith MRIA HonFInstP (born Dundalk, 1957), is an Irish physicist who was the third president of Dublin City University (DCU) in Ireland. He joined DCU in 1986 and became president in July 2010, for a term of 10 years. After his term in office, he took up voluntary roles, including the chairs of Ireland's High-Level Task Force on COVID-19 Vaccination and Future of Media Commission.

== Early life and education ==
MacCraith was born in Dundalk, County Louth, Ireland, the son of two teachers, Brian and Caitlin MacCraith. He attended Ballinaclosha Primary School in County Armagh, Scoil Eoin Baiste in Dundalk, and later CBS Dundalk (now Coláiste Rís), from where he took his Leaving Certificate. His mother taught him for three years, and his father for one.

He graduated with an honours BSc in Physics from NUI Galway, where he also completed a M.Sc. and a Ph.D in Optical Spectroscopy of Laser Materials.

== Career ==
MacCraith worked for a time at Dundalk Institute of Technology, then in 1986 he joined the staff of DCU, teaching in the physics area, and establishing the university's Optical Sensors Laboratory. He pursued research in the areas of optical chemical sensors and biosensors, biomedical diagnostics, and nanobiophotonics, and he has published and developed intellectual property in his research areas.

MacCraith was, in 1999, the founding Director of the National Centre for Sensor Research (NCSR) at DCU, helping to secure funding of almost 10 million in matching grants from Atlantic Philanthropies and the Irish government's PRTLI programme. He later proposed the Biomedical Diagnostics Institute (BDI), and in 2005, this was launched as a Science Foundation Ireland (SFI) Research Centre, with the largest quantum of funding for a research project in the history of the Irish state, and with MacCraith as its first director. He proposed the Nano-bio-analytical Research Facility (NRF) established at DCU in 2010.

MacCraith has also been a visiting scientist at the Naval Research Laboratory, Washington, D.C.

== DCU presidency ==
MacCraith was selected in the search process after Ferdinand von Prondzynski's 10-year term as DCU's second president ended, and inaugurated 13 July 2010. In his inauguration speech he commented on the fact that he and DCU's founding president, Danny O'Hare both came from Dundalk, had in fact attended the same school, and that O'Hare had been an inspiration for him. He also emphasised the importance of Ireland's east-coast population corridor, and expressed hopes of building links between DCU and Dundalk IT, and County Louth in general, and in 2012, the two institutions concluded a cooperation agreement.

Starting with his inauguration address, MacCraith has spoken publicly about the needs of industry and business from the university sector and the funding needs of third level. He has also spoken on the question of STEM participation by female students.

== National roles ==
MacCraith chaired the Strategic Review of Medical Training and Career Structures, which led to the "MacCraith Report" (June 2014), and later the Review of STEM Education in the Irish School System (reported November 2016).

He is or has been a member of the board of Social Entrepreneurs Ireland (SEI), Ibec (formerly the Irish Business and Employers’ Confederation), Chamber Choir Ireland, SciFest, the last of which he has chaired. He is also Chairperson of the three-member Board of Trustees of the Genio Trust, overseeing disbursal of funds for work in certain areas of social innovation, including dementia and home care.

=== Future of Media Commission ===
In 2020, MacCraith was appointed by the Irish government to chair the Future of Media Commission (FOMC), a commission to study and make recommendations on the future of the media in Ireland, with a particular emphasis on Public Service Broadcasting. The FOMC report was published in July 2022 and the Government accepted, and is implementing, 49 of its 50 recommendations.

=== COVID-19 ===
In November 2020, MacCraith was appointed by the Irish Government to chair its High-Level Task Force on COVID-19 Vaccination, which oversaw the COVID-19 Vaccination Programme in Ireland and provided advice to the HSE and the Department of Health on the implementation of the programme.

== Publications ==
MacCraith has published over 150 papers, and examples of peer-reviewed work include:

- "Novel polymer platform for enhanced biochip performance," Chem. Rev. 2008, 108, 2, pp. 400–422, with Burke, C.S. and McDonagh, C.
- "Novel hybrid sol-gel materials for smart sensor windows," Proc. SPIE 5826, Opto-Ireland 2005: Optical Sensing and Spectroscopy, with Guckian, A. et al.

== Awards and recognition ==
MacCraith is a Fellow of the Institute of Physics and of SPIE, the international scientific organisation for optics and photonics. He is also one of the limited numbers of Fellows of the Irish Academy of Engineering, the body set up by the Institution of Engineers of Ireland. He has also won the Mallin Invent Award for innovation.

MacCraith was elected to membership of the Royal Irish Academy, often considered the highest academic honour in Ireland, in 2007, in the Science division.

In 2014, MacCraith was awarded an honorary doctorate by the University of Massachusetts, Lowell.

== Personal life ==
MacCraith is married to Catherine MacCraith, and they have a daughter, Aoife, and a son, Eoin.

Academic offices
Preceded by Ferdinand von Prondzynski July 2000 – July 2010	President of Dublin City University; July 2010 – July 2020	Succeeded by Daire Keogh
