= Stephen Lawlor =

Stephen Lawlor (born 1958 in Dublin) is an honours graduate of its National College of Art and Design from 1980-1983. During the 1980s he taught in Dún Laoghaire Institute of Art, Design and Technology Dublin, his work during this time was based on the figure of the horse which he developed through drawings etchings, lithographs and monotypes. An accomplished painter as well as a master printer, Lawlor has recently started to make sculpture in bronze. He has had solo shows in Ireland, England and the U.S.A. and has participated in numerous International Group exhibitions. His work is in private collections in the United States, Australia, The Far East and most of Europe.

He has been a member of Graphic Studio Dublin since 1984 and is its current Chairman.

== Selected solo exhibitions ==
- 2006 Landscape, Hillsboro Fine Art, Dublin
- 2005 Hillsboro Fine Art, Dublin
- 2005 Graphic Studio Gallery, Dublin
- 2003 Recent Paintings Hillsboro Fine Art, Dublin
- 1997 Graphic Studio Gallery, Dublin
- 1997 Yello Gallery, Chicago
- 1997 Hillsborough Fine Art, Dublin
- 1993 Pantheon Gallery, Dublin
- 1990 Droichead Arts Centre, Drogheda
- 1990 Talent Store Gallery, London

== Selected group exhibitions ==
- 2004 Paintings and Prints, Stockholm, Sweden
- 2002 Northern Ljus Stockholm, Sweden
- 2001 Galleri Hippo, Stockholm, Sweden
- 2000 Triennale Mondiale Paris, France
- 1999 Boyle Arts Festival, Roscommon
- 1999 R.H.A. Gallagher Gallery, Dublin
- 1999/8 The Original Print Fair, Royal Academy, London
- 1998 Irish Heritage, Hodges Taylor Gallery, Charlottesville, N. Carolina
- 1998 Art into Art, National Gallery, Dublin
- 1998 International Ex., Stockholm, Sweden
- 1998 5 Printmakers, Frank Lewis Gallery, Killarney
- 1997 The Original Print Fair, Royal Academy, London
- 1997 Trinnale Mondiale Chamalieres, France
- 1997 Out of Ireland, Keenesaw State University, Georgia, U.S.
- 1996 Yello Gallery, Cork
- 1995 The Print Initiative, (8 shows around Ireland)
- 1994 A Sense of Ireland, Hong Kong
- 1993 Dublin Graphics, Alvar Aalto Museum, Finland
- 1992 Edition One, Graphic Studio Gallery, Dublin
- 1991 European Large Format Printmaking, Guinness Hop Store, Dublin
- 1989 International Miniprint Exhibition, R.H.A. Gallery, Dublin
- 1989 Ernesto Besso Foundation, Rome
- 1986 A Sense of Ireland, Singapore
- 1985 Central Academy of Fine Art, Beijing, China

== Awards ==
- 1989 Award Winner, International Miniprint Exhibition, R.H.A. Gallery, Dublin
- 1989 Arts Council Travel Award, Finland
- 1993 Dept. of Foreign Affairs, Travel Award, Singapore
- 1997 Arts Council Travel Award, Chicago
- 1999 Print Award, Prizewinner, R.H.A. Dublin

== Collections ==
- Allied Irish Banks
- Citibank
- Gilbeys Ireland Ltd
- Irish Computers
- Irish Management Institute
- Great Southern Hotels Group
- Dublin City University:
  - Dark Horse (Hyperion)
- Office of Public Works
- Butler Gallery, Kilkenny
- The Smurfit Group
- The Hastings Group
- Irish Intercontinental Bank
- National Gallery Of Ireland
