= Mike Pittilo =

Principal of Robert Gordon University
- In office September 2005 – 16 February 2010
- Preceded by: Bill Stevely
- Succeeded by: Ferdinand von Prondzynski

Personal details
- Born: 7 October 1954 Edinburgh, Scotland, United Kingdom
- Died: 16 February 2010 (aged 55) Aberdeen, Scotland
- Education: University of Strathclyde; University of East London
- Profession: Biologist

Robert Michael Pittilo MBE (7 October 1954 – 16 February 2010) was a British biologist and Principal and vice-chancellor of the Robert Gordon University, in Aberdeen, Scotland. Pittilo worked in research and education for most of his adult life, holding a number of positions at universities throughout the United Kingdom, notably as Foundation Dean of the Faculty of Health and Social Care Sciences at Kingston University and St George's, University of London, and as Pro Vice-Chancellor of the University of Hertfordshire.

== Early life ==
Pittilo was born in Edinburgh. He was educated at the independent Kelvinside Academy in Glasgow, and both the University of Strathclyde and University of East London, where he studied biology, graduating in 1976. He then started work as an electron microscopist at Glasgow Royal Infirmary, before taking up a post as a research assistant at the North East London Polytechnic, completing an Agricultural Research Council-supported PhD on protozoan parasites of poultry in 1981.

== Career ==
After completing his doctorate, Pittilo worked as a postdoctoral research assistant at Middlesex Hospital Medical School from 1981 to 1985, before moving to Kingston University (then Kingston Polytechnic). He began as a lecturer, rising to become a senior lecturer and then reader, being appointed professor of biomedical sciences and head of the department of life sciences in 1992, and foundation dean of the university's shared faculty of health and social care sciences with St George's, University of London, in 1995, taking on additional responsibilities for multiprofessional education in 1996 and taught postgraduate courses in 1999. In 2001, Pittilo was appointed pro vice-chancellor of the University of Hertfordshire, a post he held until being appointed principal of the Robert Gordon University in 2005.

He was chairman of the Regulatory Working Groups for Herbal Medicine and Acupuncture at the Department of Health from 2002 to 2003, returning to the position in 2006.

== Personal life ==
Pittilo married Carol Blow in 1987. He was a member of the Royal Society of Medicine and the Royal Northern and University Club, Aberdeen. He died on 16 February 2010.

Academic offices
Preceded by Bill Stevely	Principal of the Robert Gordon University; 2005–2010	Succeeded by Ferdinand von Prondzynski
