= Dublin City University Students' Union =

DCU SU
- Motto: Ex labyrinthus lux sapientia
- Institution: Dublin City University
- Location: The Hub, DCU, Glasnevin, Dublin 9
- Established: 1980 (as part of NIHE); 1989 (as DCU)
- Members: c. 20,000
- Affiliations: Aontas na Mac Léinn in Éirinn
- Website: www.dcustudentlife.ie/students-union

Dublin City University Students' Union (DCUSU) is a students' union representing Dublin City University (DCU) students. DCUSU provides social events and activities, lobbies on behalf of students to local authorities, external stakeholders and the Irish government, and is the official representation pathway between students and university authorities. DCUSU has offices located in 'The U' on the Glasnevin campus and also in the D Block on St Patrick's Campus. The representative function of DCUSU is governed by a constitution, while it is also incorporated as a company limited by guarantee for trading purposes.

The union was established in 1980/81 when Dublin City University, then NIHE, Dublin accepted its first 191 students.

== Role ==
The roles of the union include acting as a representative channel between students and DCU authorities, and providing social activities for students. All full-time and part-time students of DCU are members of the Students' Union.

DCU's associated colleges, All Hallows College, Mater Dei Institute of Education, and St Patrick's College, had their own student representation before the DCU incorporation and are now represented by the same body.

== Governance ==
The union is governed by a constitution. Amendments to the constitution may be passed after a referendum. For example, in March 2017 a referendum was held to change the constitution, with 1,731 students voting in favour. Referendums in 2016 resulted in the Students' Union declaring a pro-choice stance on abortion, and support for legalisation of cannabis use by adults.

Although there is no formal or full-time Postgraduate Students' Union present in DCU, the formation of a Postgraduate Students' Union has been discussed since 2012 and in 2017, the Class Representative Council mandated the President to develop a framework for a Postgraduate Students' Union.

== Funding and affiliation ==
The Students' Union is funded through the Office of Student Life (OSL), which is overseen by an Executive, a committee made up of students and university staff. As of 2017, the OSL supports and sponsors over 140 student run clubs and societies.

The union is a member of the Aontas na Mac Léinn in Éirinn (previously known as the Union of Students in Ireland or USI). Having voted to disaffiliate with the USI in 2002, a referendum took place in March 2013, where the student body voted to re-affiliate with USI. However, this vote was declared void by then Students' Union President Paul Doherty who questioned the constitutionality of the vote, stating that the students' union executive did not run an information campaign for the referendum. This nullification was criticised by USI, which blamed a "small cohort" in DCU for the nullification. While a referendum on USI membership in February 2014 was passed by only one vote, a majority of students voted to remain affiliated with USI in December 2016.
