= Steve Mariotti =

American educator (1953–2024)

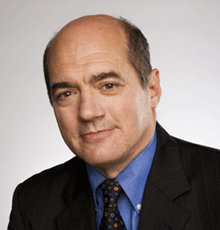
- Mariotti in 2011
- Born: August 14, 1953; Ann Arbor, Michigan, U.S.
- Died: October 20, 2024 (aged 71); Union City, New Jersey, U.S.
- Education: University of Michigan
- Occupations: Nonprofit founder and consultant, author, documentary film executive producer
- Known for: Founder of the Network For Teaching Entrepreneurship
- Relatives: Lowell B. Mason (grandfather)

Steven John Mariotti (August 14, 1953 – October 20, 2024) was an American educator, activist, and businessman. He was the founder and president (1988–2005) of the nonprofit Network For Teaching Entrepreneurship (NFTE), and the author of books and textbooks related to entrepreneurship education. Mariotti was inspired to found NFTE by his early career as a special ed teacher in New York City, as chronicled in his 2019 memoir, Goodbye Homeboy: How My Students Drove Me Crazy and Inspired a Movement, BenBella Books, co-authored with Debra Devi, with a foreword by Wes Moore. After retiring as NFTE president in 2015, Mariotti served as Senior Fellow for Entrepreneurial Education at the PhilaU Center for Entrepreneurship at Philadelphia University (2016–2018), and Senior Research Fellow for Entrepreneurship at Rising Tide Capital in Jersey City, New Jersey (2018–2020). In 2020, Mariotti executive-produced the PBS docu-series Trauma to Triumph: The Rise of the Entrepreneur. In 2021, he founded the nonprofit Center for Financial Independence to provide social entrepreneurs with mentorship and fundraising training.

== Biography ==
Steven John Mariotti was born in Ann Arbor, Michigan on August 14, 1953, and raised in Flint, Michigan. His mother was a special-education high-school teacher and his father taught industrial engineering at General Motors Institute. After earning a B.A. in economics, and an M.B.A. with a specialty in international finance from University of Michigan, Mariotti worked as a financial analyst for Ford Motor Company. At 26, he moved to New York City and opened Mason Import-Export, a small business named for his grandfather, Lowell B. Mason, who was chairman of the Federal Trade Commission from 1949 to 1950. At 28, Mariotti was assaulted by a group of six teens in East River Park. Persistent nightmares after the attack drove Mariotti to visit behavioral therapist Albert Ellis. Ellis recommended that Mariotti become "a teacher of difficult students in a difficult school" to overcome his PTSD.

In 1982, Mariotti began teaching remedial math at Boys and Girls High School in Bedford–Stuyvesant, Brooklyn. For the next five years, he taught special education in New York City's low-income neighborhoods, from the Lower East Side to the South Bronx. Mariotti noticed that students paid better attention whenever he tied his math lessons to simple real-life business examples. At Jane Addams High School in the Bronx, Mariotti was tasked with developing an off-site program for special ed students who had been expelled for violent crimes. He decided to teach these troubled students about entrepreneurship, and help them start small businesses. The resultant South Bronx Entrepreneurship Program was so successful that it was profiled in The New York Times. "World News Tonight with Peter Jennings," and other media.

In 1987, Mariotti founded the Network for Teaching Entrepreneurship (NFTE) to bring entrepreneurship education to more low-income youth. He left teaching in 1988 to devote himself to NFTE full-time, leading teams that grew NFTE into a multimillion-dollar foundation which, to date, has provided more than one million students with entrepreneurship education in 22 U.S. states and 10 countries. Mariotti regularly represented NFTE as a speaker at The World Economic Forum in Davos, a member of the Council on Foreign Relations, and a lecturer at colleges and universities.

Unable to find a high-school entrepreneurship textbook for NFTE programs to use, in 1988 Mariotti wrote Entrepreneurship: Starting and Operating a Small Business. Eleven editions have been published by Pearson, including two editions titled Entrepreneurship: Owning Your Future that received the Association of American Publishers Golden Lamp Award in 2002 and 2010. Mariotti has authored or co-authored 34 books, textbooks and workbooks, including The Young Entrepreneur’s Guide to Starting and Running a Business (Random House 2000 and 2014) with Debra DeSalvo, the junior-college textbook Entrepreneurship and Small Business Management (Pearson 2010, 2012, 2014), An Entrepreneur's Manifesto (Templeton Press, 2015) and Goodbye Homeboy: How My Students Drove Me Crazy and Inspired a Movement (BenBella Books, 2019), which received multiple awards and reached number one in four Amazon categories.

In 2013, Mariotti traveled to Southeast Asia as a guest of the U.S. State Department to discuss entrepreneurship education with business leaders in emerging economies. Mariotti's meetings with entrepreneurs in Cambodia and other war-torn regions inspired him to focus his Huffington Post blog on exploring how exposure to the entrepreneurial mindset helps victims of extreme traumas like war and genocide build thriving new lives. Mariotti investigated this topic further as executive producer of the 2020 PBS docu-series Trauma to Triumph: The Rise of the Entrepreneur.

Mariotti died from a heart attack on October 20, 2024, at the age of 71, while staying with a friend in Union City, New Jersey.

== Awards ==
- Leavey Award for Outstanding Achievement in the Field of Free Enterprise Education (1985)
- Best Business Teacher Of Year, National Federation of Independent Business (1988)
- Humanitarian Venture Award, ACE/Currie Foundation (1990)
- Inc. Entrepreneur of the Year Award/New York State (1992)
- Price Institute for Entrepreneurial Studies Appel Award (1994)
- Golden Lamp Award, Association of American Publishers (2002, 2010)
- National Director's Entrepreneurship Award, Minority Business Development Agency, U.S. Department of Commerce (2002)
- EY Entrepreneur of the Year (2004)
- Bernard A. Goldhirsh Social Entrepreneur of the Year (2005)
- John E. Hughes/USASBE Entrepreneurship Educator of the Year (2010)
- Entrepreneurship Hall of Fame Induction (2012)
- New York Enterprise Report Founders Award for Social Entrepreneurship (2012)
- American Human Rights Society Author of the Year (2019)
- IAOTP Top Entrepreneur of the Year (2019)
- IAOTP Top Global Education Social Entrepreneur of the Decade (2022)
