= Ferdinand von Prondzynski =

German-Irish university leader, commentator and candidate priest

President of Dublin City University
- In office 2000–2010
- Preceded by: Danny O'Hare
- Succeeded by: Brian MacCraith

Principal of Robert Gordon University
- In office 2011–2018
- Preceded by: Mike Pittilo
- Succeeded by: John Harper

Personal details
- Born: 30 June 1954 (age 71)

Ferdinand von Prondzynski (born 30 June 1954) is a German-born Irish citizen who was a former university leader in Ireland and Scotland, a lawyer and legal academic, a high-profile public commentator, and latterly a member of the clergy of the Scottish Episcopal Church (Anglican). Formerly the Principal and Vice-Chancellor of Robert Gordon University in Aberdeen, Scotland, he previously served as the second President of Dublin City University (DCU) in Ireland (2000–2010), and before that as a professor and dean at the University of Hull, and lecturer and Fellow at Trinity College Dublin.

== Personal life ==
=== Family background ===
von Prondzynski's family, then named Pradzynski, were originally of Kashubian origin. He is a direct descendant of Ferdinand von Prondzynski, a 19th-century Prussian general from Groschowitz, near Oppeln in Silesia (now Groszowice, near Opole within Poland). Konrad, his great-grandfather, previously had a square in Groszowice named after him.

Hans von Prondzynski was an officer in the German army during the Second World War, and was inter alia awarded the Iron Cross Class 1 (EK1). After the war, he lost his lands in what became part of Poland and moved to the new West Germany, where he worked in the cement-making business Dyckerhoff AG. They had four children: Isabelle, Ferdinand, Aglaja and Pia.

=== Early life ===
Ferdinand Victor Jean von Prondzynski was born at Bevensen on 30 June 1954. The family moved in 1961 into Knockdrin Castle on the Knockdrin estate near Mullingar, County Westmeath. The move, according to von Prondzynski, was due to his father's poor health, lack of funds to maintain Breese im Bruche, and a desire for a less stressful lifestyle. After a few years, Hans grew weary of farming and moved back to Germany and to Dyckerhoff AG, but the family kept their new estate in Ireland, and Hans retired to there in 1982. He died in Ireland in 1998, after a long illness. Irene von Prondzynski lived in Knockdrin until she died in 2017.

=== Education and early career ===
After his family moved to Ireland in 1961, Ferdinand von Prondzynski was educated at Headfort School, Kells, County Meath. In 1968 the family returned to Germany and he finished school at the Thomas-Morus Gymnasium in Oelde, Germany.

Von Prondzynski worked for Dresdner Bank in Germany from 1972 to 1974, then returned to Ireland. Having not planned to go to college, he studied at Trinity College Dublin, graduating with a Bachelor of Arts and a legal degree in 1978. He then pursued a PhD at the University of Cambridge, completing this in 1983. Von Prondzynski became an Irish citizen in 1976.

=== Family and personal life ===
On his first day lecturing at Trinity College Dublin, von Prondzynski met English lecturer Heather Ingman, and they subsequently married. Ingman became adjunct professor of English at Trinity, having previously worked at the University of Hull; she is also an academic author and novelist, and has been an occasional writer in the Irish Times. Ingman and von Prondzynski have two sons, Sebastian and Theo.

Von Prondzynski was a member of the Church of Ireland, and later the Scottish Episcopal Church, and a keen follower of Newcastle United football club.

The von Prondzynski family home was for many years Knockdrin Castle and estate, near Mullingar, County Westmeath, Ireland; this was placed on the market in 2017 and sold in January 2021 for €10m.

== Academic career ==
=== Trinity College Dublin ===
In 1980, von Prondzynski was appointed as a lecturer in the School of Business Studies, Trinity College Dublin, and became a Fellow of the college in 1987. During his time at Trinity, he gained the nickname "the Red Baron" for his allegedly leftist industrial relations views.

==== Industrial relations and employment law ====
In his early work he argued for a disengagement of the law from industrial relations, taking the position that problems and disputes were better resolved through bargaining than through litigation. He wrote the book Freedom of Association and Industrial Relations in 1984. However, from the later 1980s onwards his views began to change, and he argued for a framework of employment regulation that took account of economic pressures and the need to maintain competitive conditions. This culminated in his contribution in 2000 where he argued that the law should protect employees' rights, but also promote business success and economic growth. He has also published a number of books and articles on social policy and in particular on the importance of legal protection against discrimination.

He co-authored the first academic textbook on Irish employment law. He is also an expert on European Union matters and on competition (antitrust) policy.

=== Hull ===
From 1991 to 2000 von Prondzynski was Professor of Law in the University of Hull, latterly taking a named chair as Jean Monnet Professor of European Social Law; for much of that time he was also a Dean – first of the School of Law, and latterly of the whole Faculty of Social Sciences. He was also a Director of the British-American Business Council.

=== Dublin City University ===
Von Prondzynski was appointed as the second president of Dublin City University (DCU) in July 2000, for a ten-year term, succeeding its founding president, Danny O'Hare, after 22 years. He developed a high public profile and became known for his comments on higher education and other public policy issues. During his tenure the university increased its external research funding won from 3 to 40 million euro.

==== Achievements ====
He focused on interdisciplinary 'Academic Themes' in his time as the president of the DCU and introduced in the university's initial strategic plan during his term, Leading Change.

Under his leadership, DCU secured several high-profile research grants (particularly under the Programme for Research in Third Level Institutions, and under the Science Foundation Ireland programme for Centres for Science, Technology and Innovation).

The university's achievements were recognised internationally when, in 2007, DCU moved into the "Top 400" table of the Times Higher Education World Rankings, at 300, up from 441st place in 2006. By 2009 the university had risen in the rankings to joint 279th.

==== Reputation and controversies ====
According to a newspaper profile, von Prondzynski was liked by colleagues at DCU, even when there were disagreements. However, while "corporate" matters rather than personal, there was some controversy around three employment law cases at DCU during his tenure. These involved three members of academic staff, two senior, at the university, received much media attention. The university lost all three cases on appeal, including once at the Supreme Court, however, about one plaintiff it was held by the Supreme Court that "it must be said that his position is less than fully meritorious" and in another reinstatement was refused and a monetary award made, with a comment that the plaintiff had displayed "sometimes bizarre and unjustified behaviour" and that "by his failure to engage with DCU he contributed substantially to his dismissal."

There was also controversy over new contracts of employment and negotiations on a new disciplinary procedure, which had begun before von Prondzynski's term of office but continued throughout his tenure without resolution. As part of this controversy, a "vote of no confidence in the conduct of negotiations by senior management of the university" was narrowly passed by the small minority of staff who voted, while several parliamentary questions were raised on this matter by the Green Party.

=== Robert Gordon University ===
Von Prondzynski became Principal and Vice-Chancellor of the Robert Gordon University (commonly called RGU) in Aberdeen, Scotland, at the end of March 2011. In June 2011 the Scottish Cabinet Secretary for Education and Lifelong Learning, Michael Russell MSP, appointed von Prondzynski to chair a national review of university governance.

In 2012 he also became associated with the proposal, prompted by the university's billionaire Chancellor, philanthropist Sir Ian Wood, to redevelop the area around Aberdeen's Union Terrace Gardens. He was a prominent signatory of a letter addressed to the City Council urging it to adopt the proposal for a new 'City Garden'. In early 2013, von Prondzynski took a leading role in a high-profile local campaign by the university to prompt the regeneration of the Aberdeen city centre.

Von Prondzynski has also made several public statements questioning an aspect of British public policy designed to focus research funding on a small number of older universities, arguing that all excellent research should have the potential to be funded regardless of the university that hosts it, and arguing also that some of this funding should be directed more closely to match national economic priorities.

==== Achievements and issues ====
The university attained strong standings during von Prondzynski's tenure. According to the 2013 Times Good University Guide RGU was the best modern university in the UK and according to the Guardian University Guide 2013, it was ranked 35th overall in the UK. Analysis published by the Higher Education Statistics Agency (HESA) has indicated that graduates from full-time undergraduate degrees in each of 2011-2016 had among the top 20 employment rates of any university in the UK, with the ratio being 96.5% in 2016, and 97.6% in 2017, and it was rated by the Guardian as the best Scottish university for graduate prospects. However RGU also suffered a decline in some UK university rankings, falling from #36 in 2010 to No. 78 in the 2019 edition of The Guardian University Guide, as well as seeing a similar decline in performance in The Complete University Guide.

==== Review of governance of Scottish universities ====
In 2011 the Scottish Ministers commissioned von Prondzynski to chair a review of higher education governance. The review was welcomed by student and staff representatives across the university sector. Initially the university and College Union (UCU) raised concerns about the appointment of von Prondzynski to chair the review, because of a then ongoing dispute about recognition of the union at his university, RGU, which predated von Prondzynski's appointment as Principal. This dispute was subsequently resolved, and in the event the UCU strongly endorsed the published report.

Von Prondzynski's committee reported in January 2012, and the report was published by the Scottish government in February 2012. The report was generally well received, but some of its recommendations - and in particular the recommendations that the chairs of governing bodies should be elected, and that bonuses should largely be eliminated - were seen by some as radical. Overall the report suggested that Scotland's universities were part of the wider idea of the 'democratic intellect' and should behave in a transparent and accountable manner. The report also recommended that universities should enjoy institutional autonomy, and that they should maintain and defend academic freedom.

The Scottish government welcomed the recommendations of the review, and the Cabinet Secretary for Education and Lifelong Learning announced to the Scottish Parliament that the government would implement its findings. In November 2014 the Scottish Government published a consultation document in which it declared its intention to introduce a statute implementing key aspects of the von Prondzynski governance review.

==== RGU appointment controversy ====
In May 2018 an internal review was launched after a whistleblower flagged that RGU's newly appointed Vice-Principal for Research, Gordon McConnell, a senior academic and formerly the Head of the Office of the President at DCU, was co-director with von Prondzynski in a non-trading company holding von Prondzynski's family estate (on sale for around 13.5 million euro),; while von Prondzynski had declared a conflict of interest regarding their collaboration in DCU, he neglected to disclose the corporate relationship. Although von Prondzynski had a contractual obligation to disclose it, the information had in fact been in the public domain since 2009, and was accessible to anyone by a free search in the Irish register of companies. It was found that this breached the policy but that the appointment was valid, and the non-declaration was a "genuine omission or oversight" and did not warrant substantial action.

==== Departure and legacy ====
Responding to the events described above, von Prondzynski announced on 9 August 2018 that he would voluntarily step down from his post on 31 August. He acknowledged that the outcome of the investigation "has caused division and therefore had a damaging impact on the university’s reputation, which I personally hugely regret", and stated that his primary reason for resigning his post was "to allow RGU to recover", adding that he was "confident it will do so quickly."

The Chair of the RGU Board of Governors commented "Under his leadership, the University has had significant successes and has been recognised for its sector leadership in the national skills agenda, for the continuing development of student-centred excellence and for industry-focused research and support. RGU is recognised for its leading position in the rankings for graduate employment for students, has received a 'Gold' ranking in the Teaching Excellence Framework, and led the way in Graduate Apprenticeships." while the UCU Scotland official Mary Senior commented "It is disappointing to learn of Prof von Prondzynski's resignation." and "While we've not agreed on everything, particularly at a local level, he has made a significant contribution to higher education in Scotland."

== Public profile ==
Von Prondzynski was author of a blog and a weekly column in the Irish Times newspaper. In his blog and elsewhere he described the benefits of immigration, the risks to universities caused by the failure of the Irish Department of Education and Science to prioritise higher education, and the need to recover civility and courtesy in society. On the 'free fees' scheme in Ireland, under which Irish and EU students pay only "registration" fees, he argued that too much of the money spent on this went to wealthier people who did not need it, while poorer students are neglected. He also criticised the so-called 'points system' in Ireland which determines student entry into university courses. He has argued for a 're-think' on the numbers of lawyers educated and trained at Irish universities contending that there are too many, although during his time DCU approved a new BCL law degree. He made similar comments about the number of law graduates in Scotland when giving evidence in March 2012 before the Scottish Parliament's Education and Culture Committee. He argued for higher levels of entrepreneurship and interaction between universities and industry in Scotland.

== Other roles ==
Von Prondzynski was a member of the Irish National Competitiveness Council between 2002 and 2011, and of the National Executive Council of Ibec (then the Irish Business and Employers' Confederation). He was also a director of the Irish Universities Quality Board, the US-Ireland R&D Partnership and, for two years, chair of the Research Advisory Committee of Ireland's National Disability Authority. From 2000 to 2010, he was also a director of the Irish National Chamber Choir.

In April 2011 he was appointed to the board of directors of Educate Together, a patron body for non-denominational schools, a post he held for some years. He was also for a time a non-executive director of the formerly NASDAQ-listed e-learning company Skillsoft.

Von Prondzynski later became an ordinand — or trainee priest — with the Scottish Episcopal Church and, at some time, served as the church's Diocesan Secretary in northeast Scotland. He was criticised, along with others, in an independent review of the behaviour of his local Bishop - for colluding in alleged unsatisfactory behaviour. Separately, he was accused of using unchristian language on social media, for which he apologised.

In October 2024 von Prondzynski was ordained priest in the Scottish Episcopal Church (Anglican), serving as a member of the clergy of the Diocese of Aberdeen and Orkney.

== Recognition ==
In 2006, von Prondzynski was elected as a Member of the Royal Irish Academy, one of the highest academic honours in Ireland.

In September 2010 Prof von Prondzynski was invested by H.E. Don Carlos de Gereda y de Borbón as a Knight of Justice in the Military and Hospitaller Order of St Lazarus of Jerusalem.

Academic offices
Preceded by Mike Pittilo	Principal of Robert Gordon University; March 2011 – August 2018	Succeeded by John Harper
Preceded by Danny O'Hare 1977–1999 (A Pratt, acting, 1999–2000)	President of Dublin City University; July 2000 – July 2010	Succeeded by Brian MacCraith
