= Programme for Research in Third Level Institutions =

The Programme for Research in Third-Level Institutions (PRTLI) was an Irish Government programme that provided integrated financial support for research. It was administered by the Higher Education Authority (HEA).

== History and funding ==
In 1997 the Irish Government began providing competitive funding for advanced research in universities for the first time and created a special large financial reserve for this purpose.Reserve Fund Act. As part of this it was announced that a programme for strategic investment in research capital projects would be developed. Before the programme was launched, the Minister (Micheál Martin) held discussions with Irish-American businessman Chuck Feeney which developed into a formal partnership with his Atlantic Philanthropies. Atlantic and the government developed the plan for the funding model, and the first funding under the scheme was awarded in 1999. There were thereafter five cycles of funding, with the fifth commencing in 2010.

From 2000 to 2006 PRTLI was funded under the National Development Plan 2000–2006, with assistance from the European Regional Development Fund, and with some private sponsorship from philanthropic organisations, including Atlantic Philanthropies. In 2004, an assessment of the programme concluded that it was meeting its objectives.

The funding allocation under PRTLI Cycle 4 commenced in 2007. Approximately €230 million was allocated for major research initiatives in fifteen higher education institutions. This funding provided for workspace and researcher funding.

Cycle 5 of PRTLI funding was announced in 2010, involving €277m of state expenditure, and a further €59m of private investment. Through the five cycles, Atlantic contributed €178 million, which was around 16 per cent of the more than €1.1 billion funding to 2015.

Cycle 5 was completed by May 2018, when an additional €14.3m was allocated to PRTLI, to be used in part to help pay off outstanding bills for Cycle 5 projects. The successor to PRTLI, intended to support new investment in research infrastructure, was then being scoped and planned by "Innovation 2020", a new government strategy for research and innovation, but its form had not yet been decided.

By 2021, PRTLI was apparently no longer operational, but was regarded as having been successful.

== Description ==
PRTLI was a programme run by the Irish Government that provided integrated financial support for research for institutional strategies, programmes and infrastructure and ensured that institutions had the capacity and incentives to formulate and implement research strategies, which would give them critical mass and world level capacity in key areas of research. The programme supported research in humanities, science, technology and social sciences, such as business and law.

It was managed by the HEA on behalf of the Minister for Education and Science and the Government.

The PRTLI awards were evaluated by an international panel of assessors.

=== Objectives ===
In general the objectives of the programme were:

- To enable a strategic and planned approach by third-level institutions to the long-term development of their research capabilities, consistent with their existing and developing research strengths and capabilities.
- To promote the development of high quality research capabilities in third-level institutions, so as to enhance the quality and relevance of graduate output and skills.
- Within the framework of these objectives, to provide support for outstandingly talented individual researchers and teams within institutions and the encouragement of co-operation between researchers both within the institutions and between institutions having particular regard to the desirability of encouraging inter-institutional co-operation within the two parts of the binary system and within Ireland, the EU and internationally.

== Applications ==
The compilation of the data for AlgaeBase, a global database of algae species, was funded by PRTLI 2, 3 and 4 programmes, to the Ryan Institute at the National University of Ireland.

Cycle 3 funded the Biosolids Research Programme at Sligo Institute of Technology.

== Impact and legacy ==
A 2004 assessment concluded that "there is clear evidence that PRTLI has changed institutional thinking and has brought about an extraordinary transformation in the way third level institutions undertake research".

Don Thornhill, former secretary general of the Department of Education and Science (1993–1998) and former chair of the HEA (1998–2005), later wrote:

The step changes in the funding of research excellence introduced by PRTLI as well as the... SFI programmes enormously strengthened the "knowledge and human capital" endowments of the Irish third level sector. This contributed in no small measure to increasing the potential for increased economic value added in the Irish economy. This improved competitiveness, [and] encouraged foreign direct investment and innovation by enterprises already based in Ireland. It also provided the foundations for the export and technology-based recovery of the Irish economy in the aftermath of the 2008 financial crisis.
