= The Centre for Cross Border Studies =

Think tank in Northern Ireland

The Centre for Cross Border Cooperation
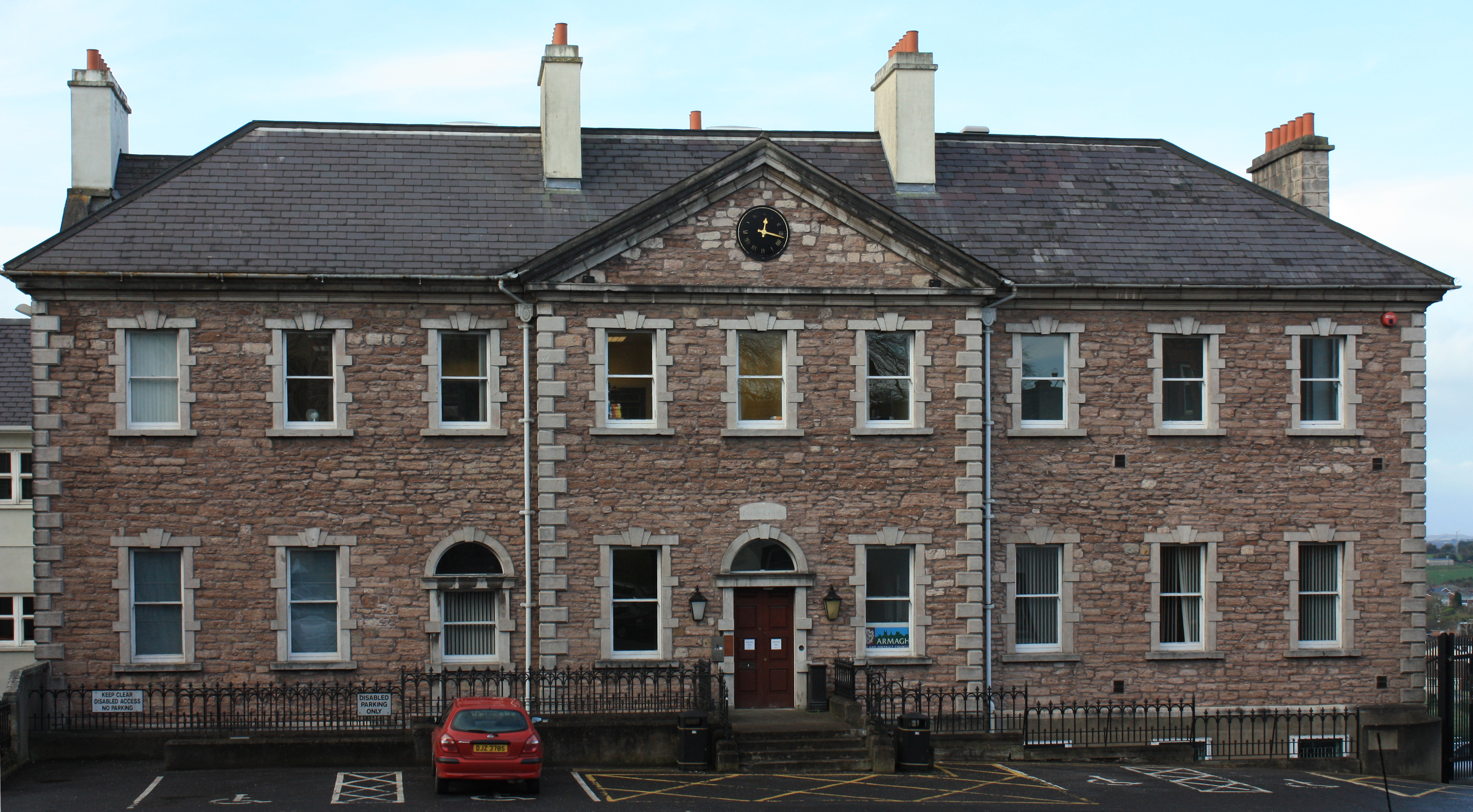
- The offices of the Centre for Cross Border Cooperation in Abbey Street, Armagh.
- Formation: 1999; 27 years ago
- Legal status: Charity (no. XR 31047)
- Location(s): Armagh, Northern Ireland and Dublin, Republic of Ireland
- Website: www.crossborder.ie

The Centre for Cross Border Cooperation (CCBC) is a think tank based in Armagh, Northern Ireland.

== Activities ==
The Centre for Cross Border Cooperation was founded as the Centre for Cross Border Studies in 1999 with the purpose of undertaking policy research in the field of cross-border cooperation on the island of Ireland and further afield.

The scope of the Centre's research encompasses all areas in which practical cross-border cooperation between the Republic of Ireland and Northern Ireland may take place; this includes healthcare, education, training, health, ICT, the economy, public administration, planning, the environment, citizens information, impact assessment and other areas.

In addition to publishing and commissioning works of cross-border policy research, the Centre also engages in a range of practical activities with the intention of facilitating cross-border cooperation. It maintains the Border People web portal, which provides practical information for cross-border workers and students on the island of Ireland as well as those crossing the border to live in the other jurisdiction. The Centre also serves as secretariat for two all-island bodies in the field of education, The Standing Conference on Teacher Education, North and South (SCoTENS) and Universities Ireland.

The Centre cooperates extensively with the North/South Ministerial Council and the eight all-island bodies created under the Good Friday Agreement.
