= NorDubCo =

Irish development corporate coalition

North Dublin Coalition Limited
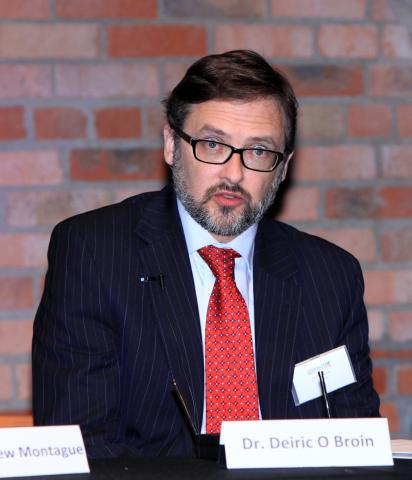
- Deiric O'Brion Chief Executive
- Type: General (Overall) Public Service Activities
- Traded as: North Dublin Development Coalition Ltd
- Headquarters: Dublin, Ireland
- Area served: North Dublin

The North Dublin Coalition Limited (NorDubCo) was established in 1996 to facilitate the social, economic and civic development of North Dublin. The original stakeholders were Dublin City University (DCU), the Ballymun Partnership, Finglas Cabra Partnership, Northside Partnership, Dublin City Council and Fingal County Council. Each of the founding members is represented on the Management Committee of NorDubCo.

== Objectives ==
The main force behind the establishment of NorDubCo was the belief that local government, local development agencies, Dublin City University and local communities working together could make a difference to the region. Throughout this period, NorDubCo has worked to ensure that sustainable social, economic and civic development takes place in the region. To achieve these objectives NorDubCo works with representatives from a wide variety of civil society sectors: the business community, local government, the local development sector, public representatives (both local and national), education establishments, the media and state and semi state institutions.

== Public Dialogue ==
In order to contribute towards a form of negotiated governance NorDubco devised a Public Dialogue Programme in conjunction with Dublin City University. They introduced the annual Martin McEvoy Seminar Series in 2002. This commemorates the former chairperson of NorDubCo who served as Chairperson from 1999 until 2007. Each year the Series attempts to address issues of contemporary concern. For example, last year's Seminar was entitled 'Adapting to Climate Change: Social Sciences Shaping the Public Policy Response at Local Level' and discussed how carbon mitigation programmes will impact locally on production, jobs, consumption, mobility and the quality of life and how social sciences can aid the transition towards a low-carbon economy and society.

== Publications and Applied Research ==
It achieves its stated aims by primarily the publication of research and also hosting seminars, conferences and briefings and by presence on the boards of government and local authority agencies. To give some perspective of the type of work undertaken over the last few years it has undertaken research work in a wide variety of areas:-

The North Dublin Skills and Employment Analysis

The cultural needs of economic migrants in North Dublin

An assessment of enterprise space in North Dublin

The Real Cost of Applying for Public Funding

An Analysis of the Impact of the National Asset Management Agency in North Dublin

== Recent Developments ==
NorDubCo has recently partnered with Bangor University and Dublin City University to develop the Menter Iontach Nua programme to develop a learning, networking and support initiative to improve the entrepreneurial skills of social enterprise. The learning programme will provide students with a master's degree in Innovation and Social Enterprise. Menter Iontach Nua has been part-funded by the European Regional Development Fund through the Ireland Wales Programme 2007-2013 (InterReg 4A) and will run until December 2014.
