= Danny O'Hare =

Irish academic leader, founder and first president of Dublin City University

Daniel O'Hare, often Danny O'Hare, (born 1942), is an Irish academic and former university leader, best known as the founding leader and first president of Dublin City University, one of two new universities established in Ireland in September 1989. He has also held a wide range of public governance positions, and is an elected Member of the Royal Irish Academy in the Science division. Coming from Dundalk, he is a chemist, specialized in advanced spectroscopy.

== Life ==
=== Early life ===
O'Hare was born in County Louth, growing up in Dundalk, where he attended the local Christian Brothers School until 1960.

=== Academic career ===
O'Hare graduated from University College Galway (UCG), now NUI Galway, where he qualified with a BSc in Chemistry, and then an MSc in Organic Chemistry. He took a post as an assistant at UCG from 1964 to 1965. He later studied for a Ph.D. at the University of St Andrews in Scotland, working with gas-phase ultraviolet spectroscopy, and qualifying in 1968.

O'Hare took up an assistant professorship at Michigan State University, before moving to the University of Southampton as a research fellow for a year.

=== RTC Letterkenny, RTC Waterford ===
O'Hare was appointed in 1971 as the first principal of Regional Technical College, Letterkenny, now Letterkenny Institute of Technology, serving until 1974, before becoming the second head of Regional Technical College, Waterford, now Waterford Institute of Technology.

=== NIHE Dublin and DCU President ===
O'Hare took up a role as the director of the to-be National Institute of Higher Education Dublin in 1977, working from a city centre office, while plans, and a campus, for the new institution were worked on. He oversaw the NIHE until 1989, when he led its conversion to university status, on the same day as the University of Limerick. He and his team secured funding from both international and national sources, including philanthropists such as Chuck Feeney. The NIHE and DCU focused on blending the needs of academia and industry, including a cooperative education system, INTRA.

O'Hare announced in November 1998 that he would step down in September 1999.

== Consultant roles ==
O'Hare has been a consultant to the World Bank and the OECD.

== Other roles ==
O'Hare has chaired the Conference of Heads of Irish Universities and the national coordinating body for distance education of adults, an area in which DCU specialised. During his time at DCU, he was also asked to chair a local project coordination body, Dublin City Council's Ballymun Regeneration Ltd., overseeing the more than a billion euro investment in renewing much of the residential provision for the area, as well as provision of new civic facilities, and, from 1994, the Board of nearby Beaumont Hospital. In 1996, he was appointed by the government as the founding chairperson of the Food Safety Authority of Ireland, overseeing staffing, establishment of its legislative basis and mission definition. He also led Ireland's Expert Group on Future Skills Needs and Task Force on the Physical Sciences, and the Information Society Commission. After his time at DCU, O'Hare also chaired the governing body of the Milltown Institute of Theology and Philosophy and the Dublin Airport Stakeholders Forum.

He has been a member of the Medical Council of Ireland, from 2008-2013, and 2013-2018, where he chaired the Fitness to Practice Committee and was a member of several other committees. He also sat on the boards of the Edmund Rice Schools Trust, the Daughters of Charity, Digitary, Music Generation, Media Lab Europe, and Calor Gas.

=== Exploration Station ===
O'Hare promoted, and is chair of the board of, the interactive National Children's Science Centre project, also known as Exploration Station, which planned to open its new educational facility in 2020.

== Memberships and recognition ==
O'Hare is a Member of the Royal Irish Academy, elected in the Science division in 1999.

He holds honorary doctorates from the University of Dublin (1992), University of Ulster (1994), Queen's University, Belfast (1995), the National University of Ireland (1999), and DCU (2008).

== Personal life ==
O'Hare is married to Sheelagh (née Kenny) from Galway, and they have four children, Michael, Nicholas, Domhnall and Fiona.

== See also ==
- Ed Walsh, founding president of the other NIHE, which also became a university in September 1989

Academic offices
Preceded by New office	President of Dublin City University (including NIHE Dublin); 1977–1999	Succeeded by Ferdinand von Prondzynski after A Pratt (acting)
