= Network For Teaching Entrepreneurship =

American nonprofit organization

NFTE (Network for Teaching Entrepreneurship)
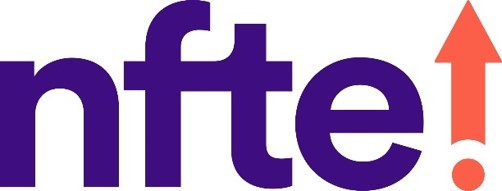
- Type: Non Profit Organization
- Founded: 1987
- Headquarters: New York City, United States
- Key people: Steve Mariotti, Founder; J.D. LaRock, President & CEO
- Revenue: 18,774,187 United States dollar (2017)
- Total assets: 11,822,494 United States dollar (2022)
- Website: www.nfte.com

The Network for Teaching Entrepreneurship (formerly National Foundation for Teaching Entrepreneurship), also referred to as NFTE (pronounced Nifty), is an international nonprofit organization providing entrepreneurship training and educational programs to middle and high school students, college students, and adults. Much of NFTE's work focuses specifically on young people in underserved communities.

NFTE provides highly academic programs and has worked with established universities such as Columbia University and University of Pennsylvania to develop programming that inspires learners to recognize opportunity and plan for successful futures by pursuing educational opportunities and by encouraging starting their own businesses.

== History ==
Founded in 1987 by business executive and entrepreneur Steve Mariotti, while he was a public high school teacher in New York City's South Bronx, NFTE was started up as a program to prevent high school dropout and improve academic performance among at-risk urban students. Combining his business background with his desire to teach at-risk students, Mariotti developed his concept based on the theory that low-income youth when given an opportunity in entrepreneurship, can employ their innate "street smarts" to develop "academic smarts" and "business smarts".

The organization's supporters include leading global companies, successful entrepreneurs and business leaders, family foundations, and respected philanthropic organizations.

== Programs ==
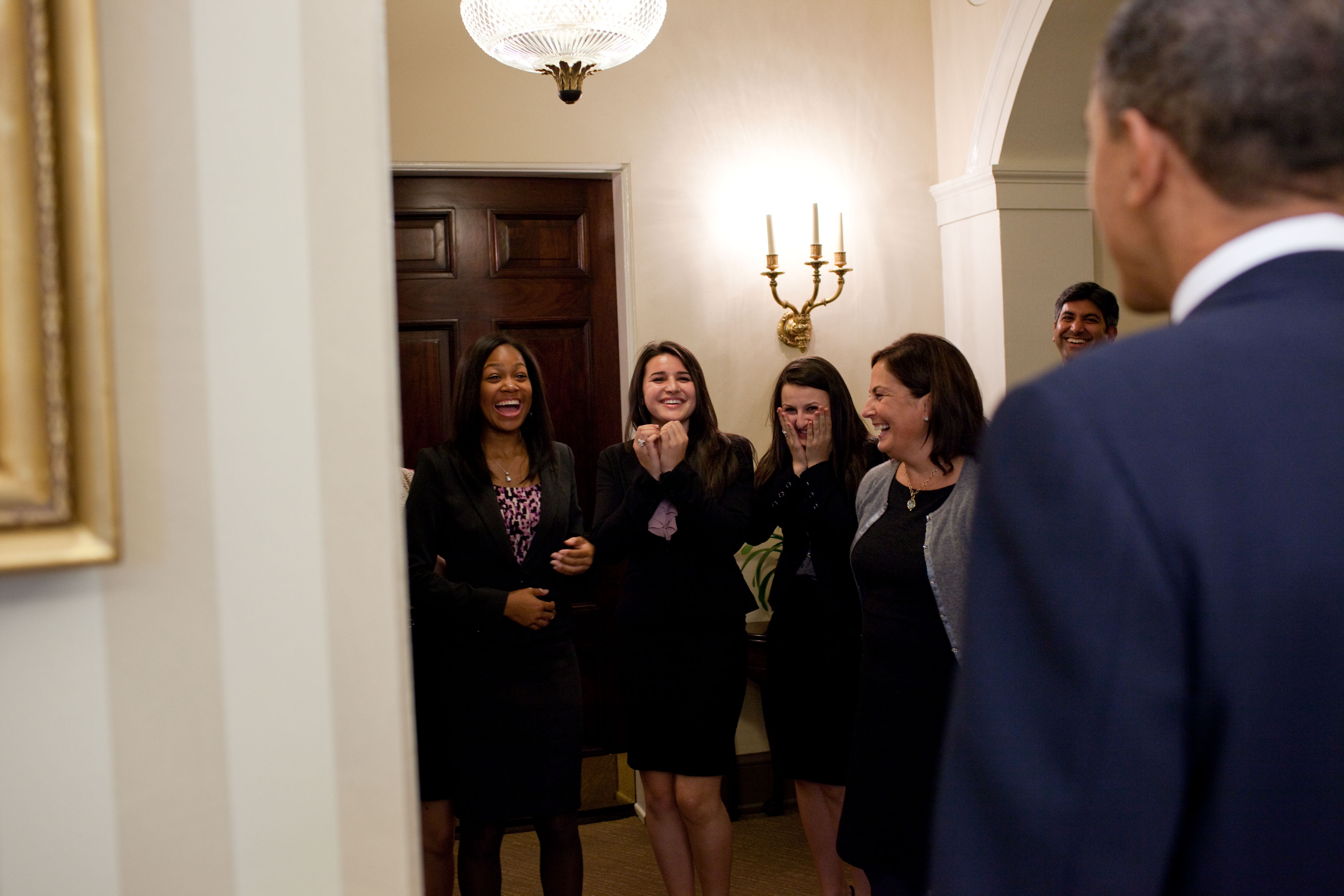
President Barack Obama greets NFTE Challenge finalists at the White House in October 2010.

NFTE programs instruct in entrepreneurship using experiential curriculum, developed through associations with major universities, as well as NFTE personnel's own experiences in teaching. There multiple versions designed for middle school, high school, and young adult students, with graduated levels of reading and complexity.

The curriculum may be used in a semester-long or year-long entrepreneurship course work, with the programs are offered in a variety of settings, including public schools, after-school programs at community-based organizations, and summer business camps. Business plan competitions and regional competitions organized by NFTE and program partners, lead to national NFTE competitions each year. Winning students receive a trip to the annual awards dinner in New York City and a grant to apply toward their business or college expenses.

NFTE runs intensive summer programs called BizCamps for students aged 13 to 18. The camp model includes field trips, guest speakers and full day, five-days-a-week course work, providing a solid understanding of business. At the end of the camp, students compete for cash awards to fund their businesses or college.
