= List of people from Dublin =

Dublin, as the capital city of Ireland and the largest city in Ireland, has produced many noted artists, entertainers, politicians and businesspeople. Also include are people affiliated with Dublin before the creation of the Republic of Ireland.

== List of Dublin people ==
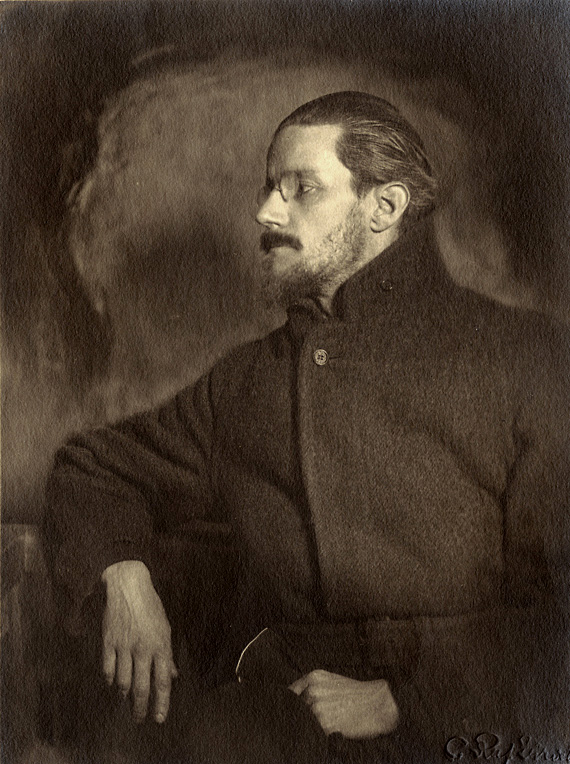
James Joyce

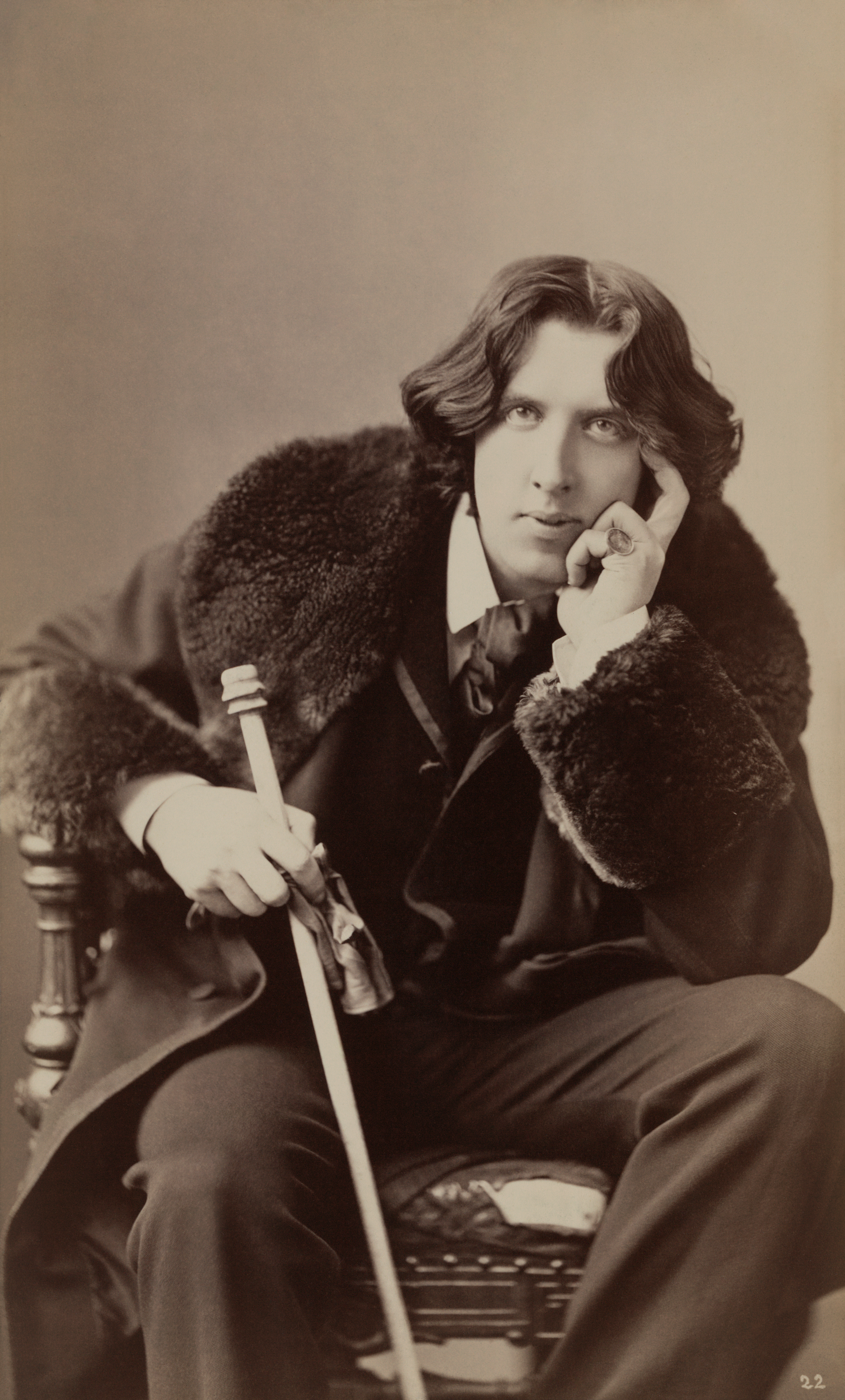
Oscar Wilde

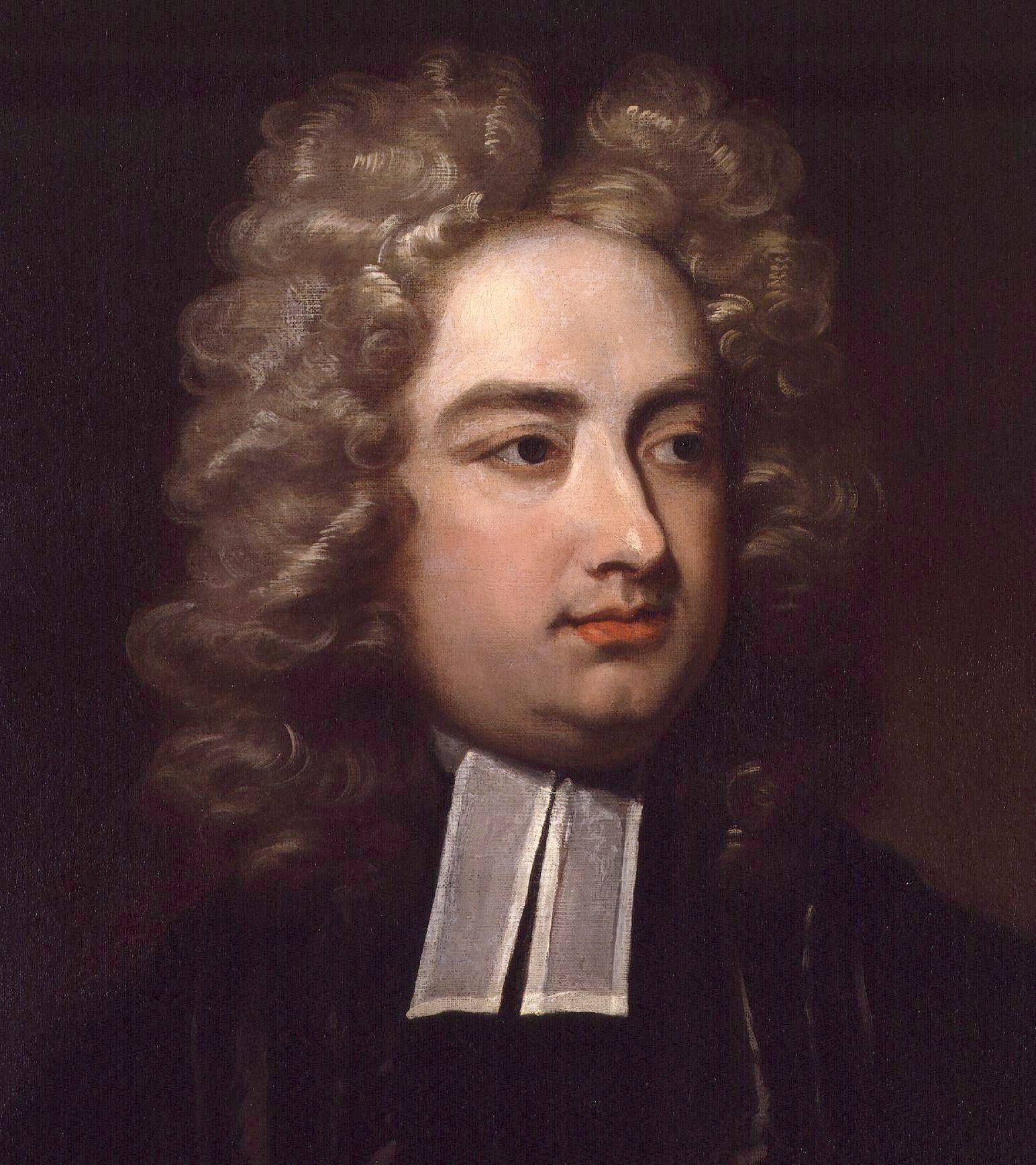
Jonathan Swift

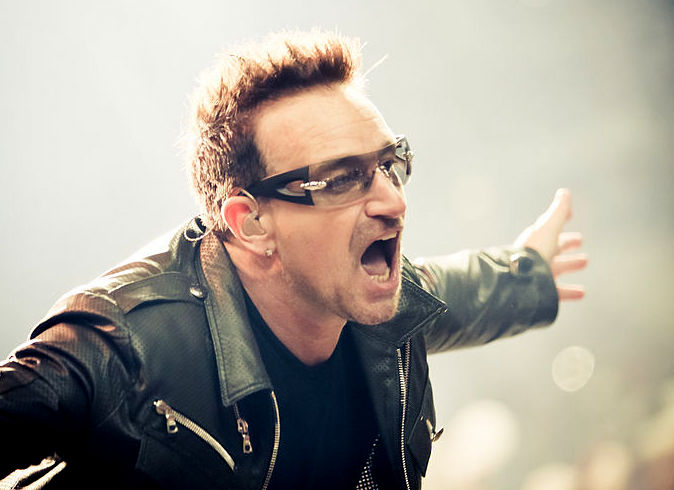
Bono

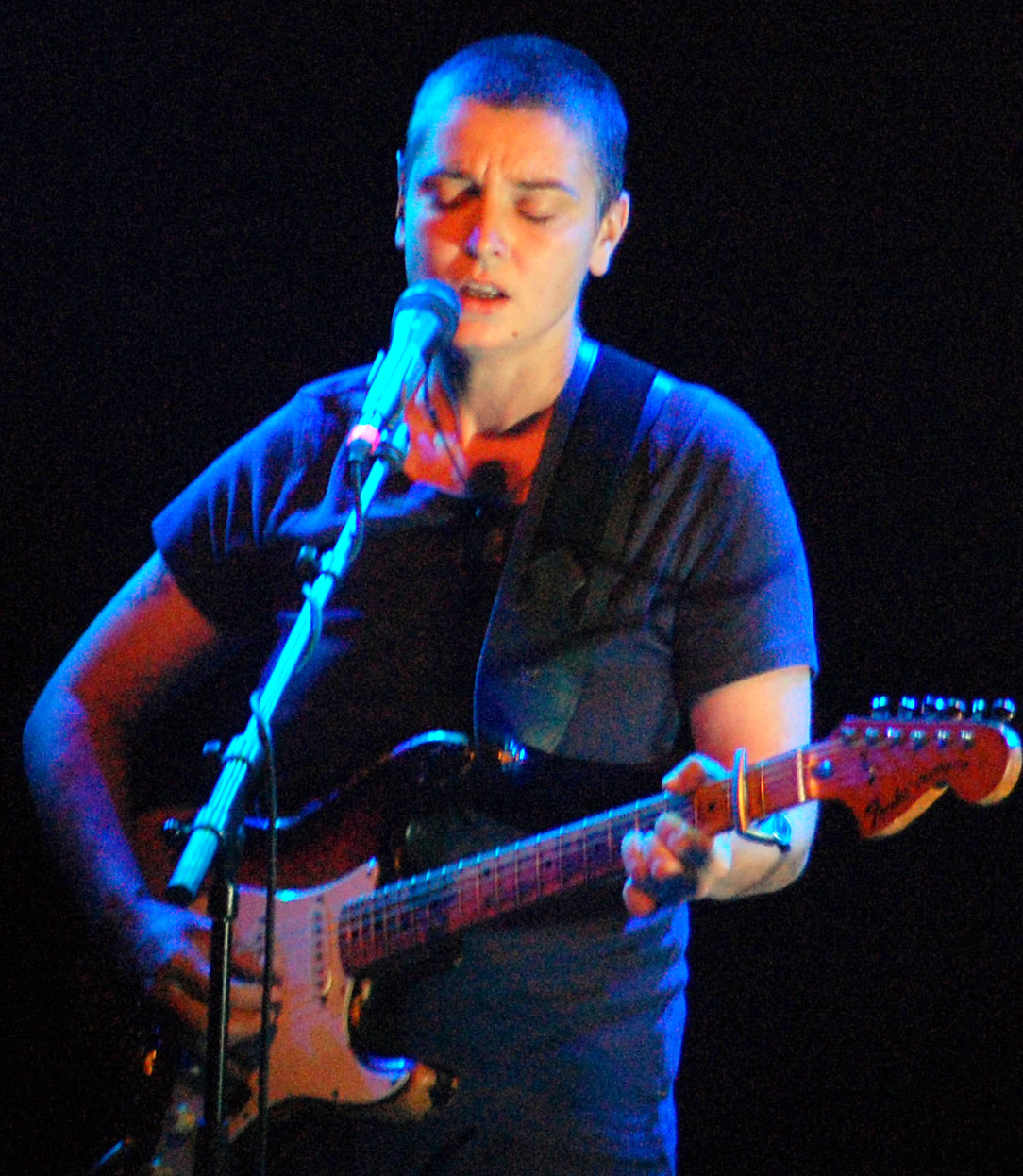
Sinéad O'Connor

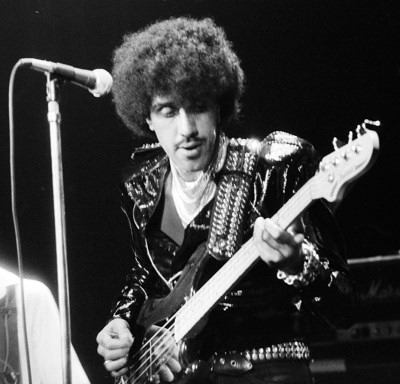
Phil Lynott

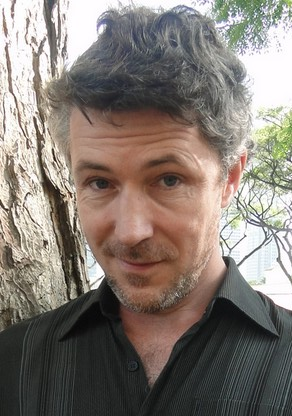
Aidan Gillen

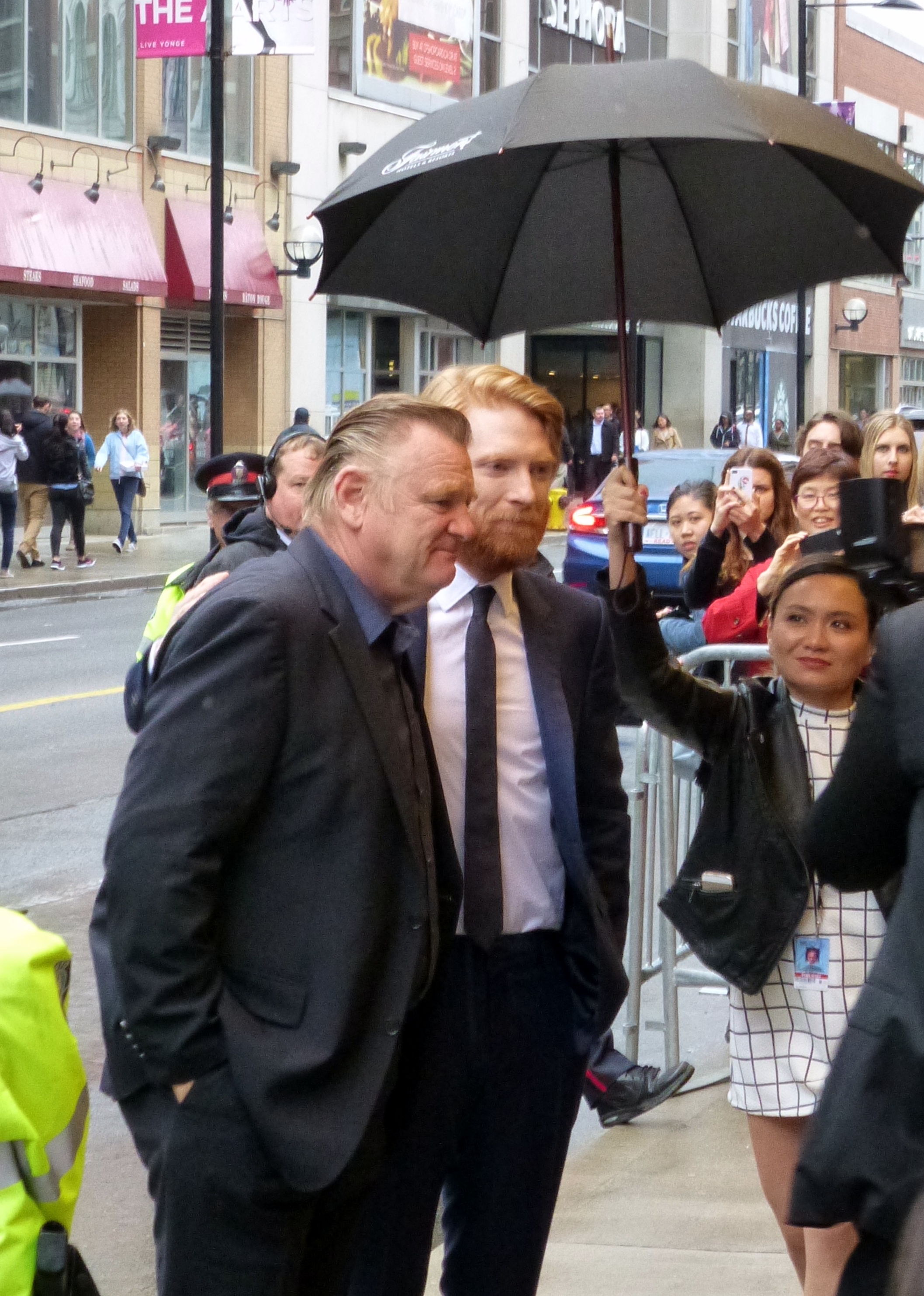
Brendan and Domhnall Gleeson

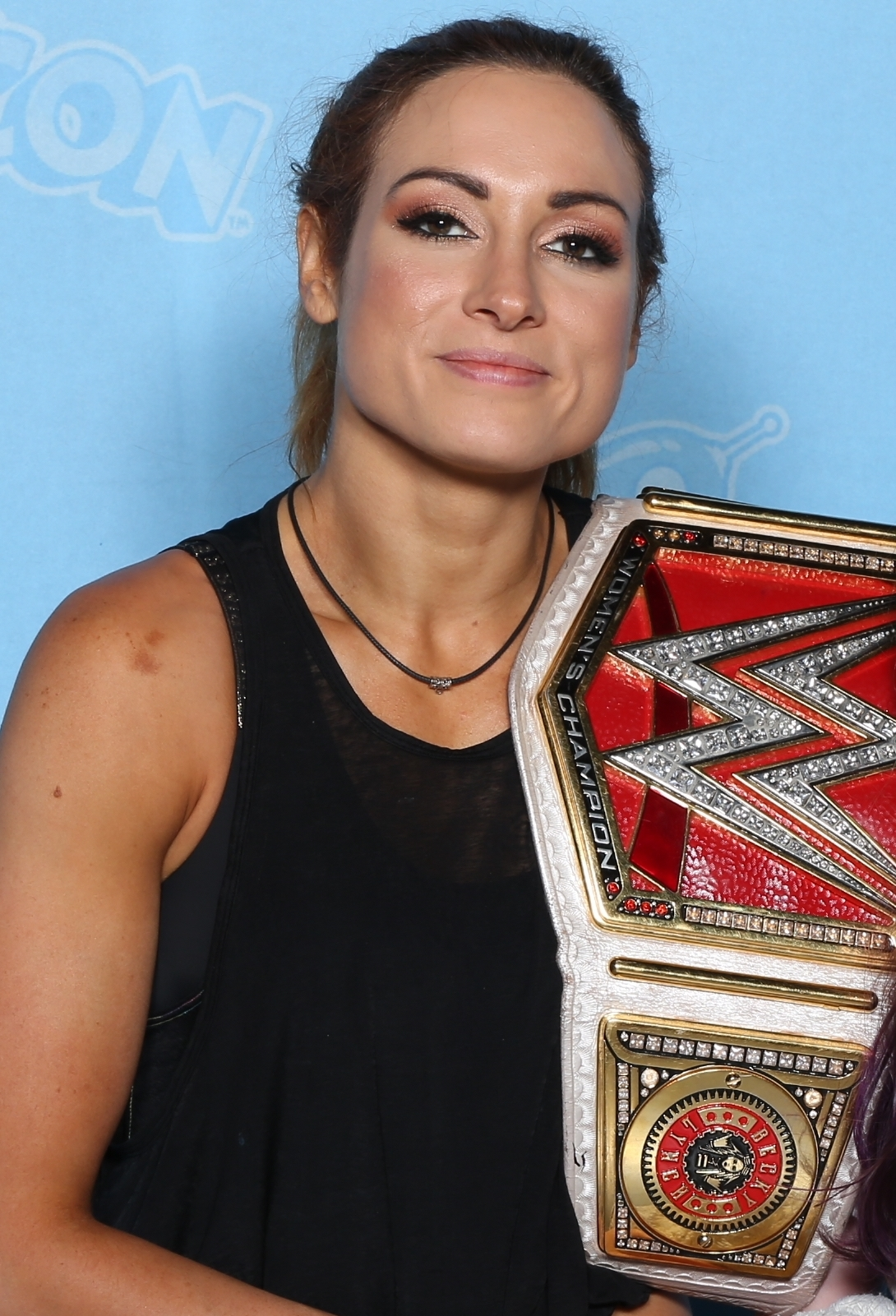
Becky Lynch

=== Writers, composers and philosophers ===
- Sebastian Barry – playwright
- Samuel Beckett – novelist, playwright, theatre director, poet and Nobel laureate
- Brendan Behan – poet, short story writer novelist, playwright
- George Berkeley – empiricist philosopher
- Jon Berkeley – writer
- Maeve Binchy – writer
- Dermot Bolger – writer
- Elizabeth Bowen – writer
- Clare Boylan – writer
- Christy Brown – writer
- John Byrne – columnist, cartoonist
- Austin Clarke – poet, novelist, dramatist
- Marita Conlon-McKenna – children's author
- Annie Jessy Curwen – author
- Donnacha Dennehy – composer
- Roddy Doyle – writer
- Anne Enright – writer
- Dave Fanning – rock journalist
- John Field – pianist, composer, wrote the first nocturnes
- Oliver Goldsmith – writer
- Annie French Hector – novelist
- Pat Ingoldsby – poet
- James Joyce – author, poet
- Trevor Joyce – poet
- Jane Jowitt – poet, memoirist
- Patrick Kavanagh – poet and novelist
- Brendan Kehoe – software developer, author
- Sheridan Le Fanu – novelist
- James Clarence Mangan – poet
- Columba Marmion – monk
- Aidan Mathews – poet, dramatist, novelist
- David McSavage – comedy writer
- Honor Molloy - playwright and novelist
- Thomas Moore – poet
- Vincent O'Brien – composer
- Seán O'Casey – playwright, memorist
- John O'Keeffe – writer
- Fintan O'Toole – journalist and political commentator
- George William Russell – writer, editor, critic, poet, painter and theosophist
- George Bernard Shaw – novelist, playwright and Nobel laureate
- Ronan Sheehan – novelist, short story writer, essayist
- Frances Sheridan – novelist
- Richard Brinsley Sheridan – playwright
- Annie P. Smithson – novelist
- Charles Villiers Stanford – composer
- Robert Prescott Stewart – composer
- Bram Stoker – novelist
- Jonathan Swift – writer, satirist
- John Millington Synge – playwright
- Joan Tighe – journalist and historian
- Oscar Wilde – playwright, author, poet
- Maev-Ann Wren – writer
- William Butler Yeats – poet, playwright and Nobel laureate
- Zozimus (Michael Moran) – poet

=== Entertainers ===
- Chloë Agnew – singer of the Celtic music group Celtic Woman
- Eamonn Andrews – radio and television presenter
- Caitriona Balfe – actress (Outlander)
- Bono – lead singer with U2 and campaigner on world debt
- Wilfrid Brambell – actor (Steptoe & Son)
- Ronan Browne – musician
- Gabriel Byrne – actor
- Gay Byrne – former presenter of The Late Late Show
- Nicky Byrne – singer in Westlife
- Luke Cheevers – traditional singer, song collector and songwriter
- Dean Clark – actor
- Daniel Condren – YouTuber and live streamer, better known as RTGame
- Cathy Davey – singer-songwriter
- Chris De Burgh – musician
- Alison Doody – actress
- Craig Doyle – television and radio presenter
- Ronnie Drew – musician
- The Dubliners – folk and ballad group (Luke Kelly, Ronnie Drew, Barnie McKenna, John Sheahan)
- Joe Duffy – broadcaster
- Elizabeth Rebecca Edwin – stage actress
- Joe Elliott – lead singer of Def Leppard
- Siobhan Fahey – singer-songwriter, Bananarama and Shakespears Sister
- Colin Farrell – actor
- Marian Finucane – broadcaster
- Barry Fitzgerald – actor
- Brenda Fricker – actress
- Michael Gambon – actor
- Orla Gartland – singer-songwriter, musician
- Stephen Gately – singer
- Bob Geldof – The Boomtown Rats lead singer; Live Aid organiser
- Aidan Gillen – actor (Game of Thrones)
- Brian Gleeson – actor
- Brendan Gleeson – actor
- Domhnall Gleeson – actor
- John & Edward Grimes – singing twins nicknamed "Jedward"
- Glen Hansard – lead singer of The Frames; actor
- Neasa Hardiman – director
- C. Morton Horne – musical comedy actor
- Hozier - singer
- Siva Kaneswaran – member of boy band The Wanted
- Ronan Keating – singer
- Lisa Kelly – singer
- Luke Kelly – musician
- Pat Kenny – former presenter of The Late Late Show
- Lisa Lambe Laois actress and singer
- Phil Lynott – from the band Thin Lizzy
- Annie Mac – DJ and presenter
- Edwin Maxwell – actor
- Margaret Mazzantini – actress
- Brian McFadden – former singer in Westlife
- Susan McKeown – Grammy-winning folk singer
- Kitty McShane – actor/singer who appeared in the Old Mother Riley films with Arthur Lucan
- Jonathan Rhys Meyers – actor
- Larry Mullen – drummer for U2
- Samantha Mumba – singer, actress
- Aubrey Murphy – violinist
- Jonathon Ng – musician, under the alias EDEN
- Colm Ó Cíosóig – musician, drummer of My Bloody Valentine
- Sinéad O'Connor – singer
- Jimmy O'Dea – actor and comedian
- Róisín O'Donovan - actress
- Danny O'Donoghue – lead singer for The Script
- Maureen O'Hara – actress
- Liam Ó Maonlaí – singer, bodhrán player; member of Hothouse Flowers
- Maureen O'Sullivan – actress
- Gerard Parkes – actor; moved with his family to Canada
- Noel Purcell – actor, singer
- Glenn Quinn – actor
- Gerry Ryan – television presenter
- Isabella Rudkin – child musical prodigy and harpist
- Andrew Scott – actor (Sherlock)
- Thomas Sheridan – actor
- Kevin Shields – musician, vocalist and guitarist of My Bloody Valentine
- Carly Smithson – singer, appeared on American Idol; lead singer of We Are the Fallen
- Ronan Tynan – inspirational tenor
- Bernie Tormé – guitarist
- Ryan Tubridy – former presenter of The Late Late Show
- Aidan Turner – actor (The Hobbit, Being Human, Poldark)
- Louis Walsh – judge of X-Factor
- Alisha Weir – actress and singer

=== Politicians and leaders ===
- Bertie Ahern – former Taoiseach
- John Binns – politician
- Edmund Burke – father of modern conservatism
- Timothy Burns – Lieutenant Governor of Wisconsin
- Edward Carson – Leader of Irish Unionism and British Cabinet minister
- Sean Casten – U.S. representative for Illinois
- James Caulfeild, 1st Earl of Charlemont – statesman
- George Colley – politician
- Harry Colley – politician
- Liam Cosgrave – former Taoiseach
- Hans Crocker – Mayor of Milwaukee, Wisconsin
- Andrew Cunningham – Admiral of the Fleet, Royal Navy
- Thomas Davis –U.S. representative for Rhode Island
- Robert Emmet – Nationalist
- Garret FitzGerald – former Taoiseach
- Henry Flood – statesman
- Philip France – politician
- Henry Grattan – politician and member of the Irish house of commons
- Seán Lemass – Taoiseach from 1959 to 1966
- Jim Mitchell – youngest Lord Mayor of Dublin (aged 29)
- Brendan Moran – former diplomat
- James Napper Tandy – revolutionary
- J. C. Neville – Wisconsin State Assemblyman
- Thomas O'Neill – Wisconsin State Assemblyman
- Patrick Pearse – writer, leader of the Easter Rising
- William Petty – British Prime Minister
- John Reed – immigrant to California; prominent in early California settlement
- Richard Saul – aviator and commander in the Battle of Britain
- Theobald Wolfe Tone – revolutionary, leader of the United Irishmen
- Leo Varadkar – Taoiseach
- Arthur Wellesley – British Prime Minister
- William Whitshed – politician

=== Soldiers ===
- Hugh Burgoyne – recipient of the Victoria Cross
- Thomas Byrne – recipient of the Victoria Cross
- Thomas Crean – recipient of the Victoria Cross and rugby union international
- Christian Davies – trooper of the Royal Scots Greys
- John Farrell – recipient of the Victoria Cross
- George Forrest – recipient of the Victoria Cross
- Peter Gill – recipient of the Victoria Cross
- Patrick Graham – recipient of the Victoria Cross
- James Jackman – recipient of the Victoria Cross
- Henry Jones – recipient of the Victoria Cross
- Richard Keatinge – recipient of the Victoria Cross
- James Kenny – recipient of the Victoria Cross
- Harry Lyster – recipient of the Victoria Cross
- William Manley – recipient of the Victoria Cross
- Arthur Moore – recipient of the Victoria Cross
- Thomas Murphy – recipient of the Victoria Cross
- Claude Nunney – recipient of the Victoria Cross
- Edmund O'Toole – recipient of the Victoria Cross
- Hamilton Reed – recipient of the Victoria Cross
- James Henry Reynolds – recipient of the Victoria Cross
- Robert Rogers – recipient of the Victoria Cross
- Frederick Smith – recipient of the Victoria Cross
- Philip Smith – recipient of the Victoria Cross

=== Sport ===
- Jacko Barry – darts player
- Gavin Bazunu – footballer
- Liam Brady – former Arsenal, Juventus and Republic of Ireland footballer
- Jason Byrne – Championship and Irish international footballer
- Christy Canavan – former footballer
- Stephen Carr – Premiership and Irish international footballer
- Willie Carrick – footballer
- Dennis Cirkin – footballer
- Eamonn Coghlan – World Championship-winning athlete
- Steve Collins – World Championship-winning boxer
- Rachel Costello – camogie player
- Stephen Dawson – former Leicester and under-21 Republic of Ireland footballer
- Ronnie Delaney – Olympic gold medalist
- Ken Doherty – winner of World Snooker Championship
- Dan Donnelly – first Irish-born heavyweight boxing champion
- Damien Duff – former Premiership and Irish international footballer
- Bernard Dunne – retired boxer; former WBA Super Bantamweight World Champion and European Super Bantamweight Champion
- Jamie Finn – Republic of Ireland national football team player
- Willo Flood – SPL and Championship footballer
- Johnny Giles – former Leeds United and Republic of Ireland footballer
- Pádraig Harrington – Ryder Cup-winning golfer
- Eddie Jordan - motorsport executive and broadcaster
- Edmund Joyce – Middlesex and Ireland cricketer
- Robbie Keane – Major League Soccer and Irish international footballer
- Abbie Larkin – Republic of Ireland national team footballer
- Joe Lawless – Irish soccer player
- Becky Lynch – WWE wrestler/diva
- Paul McGinley – Ryder Cup-winning golfer
- Mick McGowan – darts player
- Conor McGregor – UFC fighter
- Velvet McIntyre – retired wrestler
- Jim McQuillan – darts player
- Jason Molins – cricketer
- Kevin Moran – former All Ireland-winning Dublin Gaelic footballer, Manchester United and Republic of Ireland footballer
- Eoin Morgan – former Ireland cricket team player who currently plays for Middlesex County Cricket Club and England
- Mark Nulty – Irish cricketer
- Kevin O'Brien – Irish cricketer
- Niall O'Brien – Northamptonshire and Ireland cricketer
- Cian O'Connor – equestrian
- Brian O'Driscoll – former Leinster, Ireland and Lions rugby player
- Pat O'Toole – former professional footballer
- Niall Quinn – former footballer for Arsenal, Sunderland and Republic of Ireland
- Charlie Redmond – Dublin footballer
- Stephen Roche – Tour de France-winning cyclist
- Alan Ruddock – introduced Karate and Aikido to Ireland; 6th dan Aikidoka
- Brian Shawe-Taylor – racing driver
- Sheamus – WWE wrestler, real name Stephen Farrelly
- Jason Sherlock – Dublin footballer
- Michelle Smith – Olympic gold (3) and bronze (1) medal-winning swimmer
- Frank Stapleton – former Arsenal, Manchester United and Republic of Ireland footballer
- Jim Stynes – Australian rules footballer
- Lyra Valkyria – WWE wrestler
- Ronnie Whelan – former Liverpool and Republic of Ireland footballer

=== Other ===
- Francis Bacon – painter
- René Bull – illustrator and war artist
- Harry Clarke – stained glass artist
- Veronica Guerin – journalist
- Hugh Hamilton – bishop
- William Rowan Hamilton – mathematician
- William Edwin Hamilton – civil engineer
- Francis Hardy – barrister
- Josephine Heffernan – Irish-American nurse in WWI
- Rex Ingram – film director
- Mainie Jellett – painter
- Alan Joyce – CEO of Qantas Airways Limited
- Robert Mallet – geophysicist, father of seismology
- Leonard McNally – barrister
- David McWilliams – writer, presenter and economist
- Sharon Ní Bheoláin – journalist
- William Orpen – painter
- Peter Rice – engineer
- Sean Scully – painter
- Louise O'Sullivan – founder and CEO of Anam Technologies
- Edward Hutchinson Synge – physicist
- John Lighton Synge – mathematician
- William Tisdall – priest
- Theodore David Wallace - barrister and colonial administrator
- Ailish Walsh – victim of murder
- Willie Walsh – CEO of British Airways
- Una Watters – artist and librarian
- Mary Woffington – socialite

== See also ==
- List of University of Dublin people
- List of University College Dublin people
- List of Dublin City University people
- List of Irish people
- Category:People from County Dublin
