= List of Dublin City University people =

This is a list of notable alumni, faculty members, leaders and supporters of Dublin City University, Ireland:

== Presidents ==
- Danny O'Hare, founding president, NIHE 1977–1989, DCU 1989–1999
- Ferdinand von Prondzynski, 2000–2010
- Brian MacCraith, 2010–2020
- Daire Keogh, 2020–

== Notable faculty ==
- Pat Barker, registrar and professor
- Patrick Brereton
- John Bruton, adjunct faculty, former Taoiseach
- Farrel Corcoran, retired professor
- Michael Cronin, MRIA, later to TCD
- Edward de Bono, adjunct faculty
- David Denby, retired
- Robert Elgie, professor, MRIA
- Diarmaid Ferriter, former member
- Barbara Freitag
- Marnie Holborow
- John Horgan, retired
- Brigitte Le Juez
- Colm Kearney, former member, deceased
- James Kelly, professor
- Colum Kenny, professor, journalist, barrister
- Peadar Kirby, former member
- Barbara O'Connor
- Roderic O'Gorman
- James O'Higgins Norman
- Donal O'Mathuna
- Eugene O'Riordan
- Derval O'Rourke
- Caoilfhionn Nic Pháidín, retired
- Paschal Preston
- Kevin Rafter
- Helena Sheehan, retired
- Alan Smeaton, professor
- Malcolm Smyth
- Chris Stevenson, deceased
- Brian Trench
- Paul F. Whelan
- Jenny Williams
- Prof John Doyle, Vice-President of Research

== Alumni ==
=== Media / communications ===
- Úna-Minh Caomhánach, journalist and writer
- Rory Carroll, news correspondent, The Guardian newspaper
- Matt Cooper, presenter of The Last Word; Today FM; Sunday Times columnist
- Noel Curran, former Director General of RTÉ
- Richard Curran, presenter of Dragons' Den; columnist for Sunday Independent
- Mark Little, founder of Storyful; former CEO of Ireland Twitter; e- US correspondent and presenter of Prime Time, RTÉ
- John Mulholland, Editor of The Observer
- Breda O'Brien, columnist (Mater Dei Institute)
- Kevin O'Sullivan, Editor of Irish Times
- Caitríona Perry, journalist and co-anchor for RTÉ
- Sean Whelan, Economics Editor, RTÉ
- Beth Boylan, businesswoman

=== Arts ===
- Declan Buckley, television personality
- Marina Carr, author and playwright
- Finghin Collins, pianist
- John Connolly, author
- Neil Delamere, comedian
- Uaneen Fitzsimons, television presenter and DJ
- Breandán de Gallaí (Brendan Galway), Riverdance dancer
- Hazel Hayes, author, filmmaker, and YouTuber
- Patrick McCabe (SPD), novelist
- John McGahern (SPD)
- Caroline Morahan, RTÉ's Off the Rails, Fair City
- Barry Murphy, actor, comedian
- Ardal O'Hanlon, comedian, known for Father Ted
- Dearbhla Walsh, television director and Emmy Award winner
- Laura Whitmore, MTV UK presenter
- Don Wycherley (SPD)

=== Business ===
- John Hourican, banker, CEO of the Bank of Cyprus
- Albert Manifold, CEO of CRH plc
- Brody Sweeney, CEO and founder of O'Briens Irish Sandwich Bars
- Lorraine Twohill, Chief Marketing Officer of Google

=== Law, politics, and government ===
- Rotimi Adebari, Ireland's first black mayor, Portlaoise
- Clare Daly, TD, Dublin North 2016–2019, MEP 2019–
- Seán Dorgan, General Secretary of Fianna Fáil
- Brendan Howlin (SPD), Labour Party Teachta Dála
- Enda Kenny (SPD), Teachta Dála, Taoiseach 2011–2017, Leader of Fine Gael 2002–2017
- Conor Lenihan, Fianna Fáil Teachta Dála; former Minister of State
- Mary Lou McDonald MEP, TD Teachta Dála, Deputy Leader of Sinn Féin since February 2009
- Helen McEntee, TD, Fine Gael, Meath-East and Minister of State for Health - Older People
- Rónán Mullen, former Senator
- Kathleen O'Meara, former Senator
- Kathryn Reilly, former Sinn Féin Senator
- Noel Rock, former Fine Gael TD
- Brendan Ryan
- Duncan Smith, Labour TD

=== Sportspeople ===
==== DCU GAA ====
(Republic of Ireland) Ireland international rules football team players

- Colm Begley
- Bernard Brogan
- Stephen Cluxton
- Cathal Cregg
- Bryan Cullen
- Paul Flynn
- Paddy Keenan
- James McCarthy
- Anthony Moyles
- Ross Munnelly
- Michael Murphy
- Seán Óg Ó hAilpín
- Shane Ryan

Senior inter-county footballers

Dublin

- Paddy Andrews
- Bernard Brogan
- Paul Casey
- Paddy Christie
- Stephen Cluxton
- Jonny Cooper
- Bryan Cullen
- Paul Flynn
- Declan Lally
- James McCarthy
- Philly McMahon
- Kevin Nolan
- Eoghan O'Gara
- Tomás Quinn
- Ian Robertson
- Shane Ryan

Cavan

- Seanie Johnston
- John Tierney

Cork

- Seán Óg Ó hAilpín

Donegal

- Michael Boyle
- Michael Murphy

Galway

- Tom Flynn

Kildare

- Seanie Johnston

Laois

- Colm Begley
- Ross Munnelly

Louth

- Paddy Keenan

Mayo

- Rob Hennelly
- Conor Mortimer

Meath

- Anthony Moyles

Roscommon

- Cathal Cregg
- David Keenan
- Donal Shine

Sligo

- David Kelly

Senior inter-county ladies' footballers

Dublin

- Rachel Barrett
- Leah Caffrey
- Lucy Collins
- Lyndsey Davey
- C.J. Hogan
- Ciara McGuinness
- Eimear McGlade
- Niamh McEvoy
- Ciara Mulligan
- Deirdre Murphy
- Lindsay Peat
- Eabha Ruitleas
- Siobhan Woods

Mayo

- Sarah Rowe

Senior inter-county hurlers

Dublin

- Shane Ryan

Clare

- Teu Ó hAilpín

Cork

- Seán Óg Ó hAilpín

Galway

- Brian Flaherty

Kilkenny

- Brian Flaherty
- Walter Walsh

Laois

- Darren Rooney

Wexford

- Andrew Shore

Gaelic handballers

- Derek Henry
- Eoin Kennedy

==== Ireland men's rugby union internationals ====
- Tadhg Furlong
- Jamie Heaslip
- Trevor Hogan
- Bernard Jackman
- Marty Moore

==== Ireland women's rugby union internationals ====
- Lindsay Peat

==== Ireland men's field hockey internationals ====
- Conor Harte
- David Harte

==== Ireland women's field hockey internationals ====
- Hannah Matthews
- Alison Meeke

==== Others ====
- Kevin Hunt, Bohemians captain
- Fionnuala McCormack, European cross country champion
- Ger McDonnell, reached the summit of Everest in May 2003
- Ciara Peelo, Olympic sailor, Beijing 2008
- Darren Sutherland, bronze medalist boxer, Beijing Olympic Games, 2008
- John Tierney, Ireland Australian rules football international
- Seán Óg Ó hAilpín, Ireland shinty–hurling international

== Honorary degree holders (not otherwise listed) ==
- Amal Al Qubaisi
- Jocelyn Bell-Burnell
- Bill Clinton
- Wesley Cocker
- Brian Cody
- John Coolahan
- Mary Davis
- Susan Denham
- Nuala Ní Dhomhnaill
- Roddy Doyle
- John Fitzpatrick
- Olwen Fouéré
- Brian Friel
- David Hammond
- Charles Haughey
- Seamus Heaney
- John Hume
- Owen Keenan
- John E. Kelly III
- Seán Kelly
- Stanislaus Kennedy
- Dermot Lane
- Louis le Brocquy
- Pearse Lyons
- Margaret MacCurtain
- Timothy Mahony
- Seamus Mallon
- James G. March
- Martin McAleese
- Mary McAleese
- Neil V McCann
- John McGahern
- Paid McGee
- Peter McVerry
- George J. Mitchell
- John Francis Mitchell
- Stephen Myers
- Martin Naughton
- Colm William O'Connell
- Brian O'Driscoll
- Brian O'Dwyer
- Labhrás Ó Murchú
- Sonia O'Sullivan
- John Pilger
- Paul Quigley
- Tomi Reichental
- Mary Robinson
- Tony Scott
- Jean Kennedy Smith
- Peter Sutherland
- Katie Taylor
- Mother Teresa
- Patrick A Toole
- David Trimble
- Willie Walsh
- Ernest Walton
- Maurice Whelan
- T. K. Whitaker
- Patrick J. Wright
- Muhammad Yunus

== Members of DCU's Governing Authority and of the Board of the Educational Trust ==
- David Byrne, Chancellor, 2006–2011
- Gay Byrne, past member, DCU Educational Trust
- Veronica Guerin, member of the governing body of DCU, 1982–1992
- Martin McAleese, Chancellor, 2011–
