= O'Riordan =

O’Riordan is a surname of Irish origin. According to historian C. Thomas Cairney, the O'Riordans were one of the chiefly families of the Éile tribe who in turn came from the Dumnonii or Laigin who were the third wave of Celts to settle in Ireland during the first century BC.

Notable people with this surname include:

- Aodhán Ó Ríordáin (born 1976), Irish politician
- Brendan O'Riordan, Irish football player
- Brian O'Riordan (born 1981), Irish rugby player
- Cait O'Riordan (born 1965), British rock musician
- Conal Holmes O'Connell O'Riordan (1874–1948), Irish dramatist and novelist
- Dolores O'Riordan (1971–2018), Irish singer and songwriter
- Don O'Riordan (born 1957), Irish football player and coach
- Eugene O'Riordan, Irish author and professor of mathematics
- Jerry O'Riordan (1925–1987), Irish hurler
- Julius O'Riordan (born 1966), British DJ
- Mark O'Riordan (born 1980), Irish hurler
- Michael O'Riordan (1917–2006), Irish communist; founder of the Communist Party of Ireland
- Mossy O'Riordan (1926–2008), Irish hurler
- Rachel O'Riordan (born 1974), Irish theatre director
- Robert O'Riordan (1943–2004), Canadian author
- Seán Ó Ríordáin (1917–1977), Irish poet

== See also ==
- Riordan, a surname
- Irish clans
