= Bonnie Ann Clyde =

Irish drag performer (born 1994)

- Born: James Keogh; 3 October 1994 (age 31); Dublin, Ireland
- Education: Dublin City University
- Occupation: Drag performer
- Television: RuPaul's Drag Race UK (series 7)

James Keogh (born 3 October 1994), known professionally by the stage name Bonnie Ann Clyde, is an Irish drag performer. Bonnie Ann Clyde competed on the seventh series of the British television series RuPaul's Drag Race UK.

== Early life ==
Keogh was born in Dublin. He studied communications at Dublin City University.

== Career ==
Bonnie Ann Clyde began performing in drag in the mid-2010s. She appeared on RTÉ's web series My Best Sustainable Life in 2019, and Virgin Media's reality TV show Eating With The Enemy in 2021. Bonnie Ann Clyde competed on the seventh series of RuPaul's Drag Race UK. She is the show's first contestant from the Republic of Ireland. She won the Snatch Game challenge (episode "Snatch Me Out!").

== Personal life ==
Keogh is based in Manchester. He has also lived in Gran Canaria and San Francisco. His stage name pays tribute to his late cats, Bonnie and Clyde, whom he named after the American outlaw couple.

Bonnie Ann Clyde organized a drag fundraiser for Chechnya in 2018.

== Filmography ==
=== Television ===
- RuPaul's Drag Race UK (series 7; 2025)

== See also ==
- List of Dublin City University people
- List of people from Dublin
