= Paul Whelan (disambiguation) =

Paul Whelan (born 1970) is a Canadian/American corporate security director arrested in Russia in late 2018 on accusations of being a spy.

Paul Whelan may also refer to:

- Paul Whelan (politician) (1943–2019), New South Wales state politician
- Paul F. Whelan, Irish computer scientist

== See also ==
- Paul Weyland (1888–1972), German antisemitic leader of the Anti Einstein League
