= Barbara O'Connor =

Barbara O'Connor may refer to:

- Barbara O'Connor (media studies scholar), author and academic at Dublin City University
- Barbara O'Connor (author), author of children's books
