= Right2Water Ireland =

Protest movement

Right2Water Ireland is a populist protest movement campaigning against Irish Water's introduction of water charges in Ireland.

== Support and Opposition ==
Right2Water Ireland is supported by trade unions Unite the Union, the Communication Workers Union, the Civil and Public Services Union, MANDATE and Operative Plasterers and Allied Trades Society of Ireland (OPATSI), as well as political parties and politicians including Clare Daly and Mick Wallace, the Communist Party of Ireland, the Anti-Austerity Alliance, the People Before Profit Alliance, the Workers' Party, éirígí and Sinn Féin.

Right2Water Ireland shares opposition to privatisation with the European wide campaign Right2Water, however they differ on other water charges with the European campaign being open to charging for water.

== Marches ==
Right2Water Ireland's first march in Dublin took place in October 2014. Subsequently, the group organised almost 100 protests across Ireland on 1 November 2014, including a second march in Dublin. These demonstrations forced major concessions from the government. On 21 October, Irish Water announced non-compliance rates of 66 per cent before the initial deadline ten days later, and the utility company was forced to extend its registration deadline by one month. While some government politicians and media reports associated them with an allegedly "sinister" protest in Jobstown later that month, Right2Water has explicitly stated that it was not involved.

Right2Water Ireland organised a third national demonstration in Dublin on 10 December 2014. An unofficial breakaway group of protesters occupied the main junction of the, city O'Connell bridge. Traffic was brought to a standstill as protesters used barricades and sat on the roads to block traffic. After several hours the crowd of 1,000 had dwindled to an estimated 200. Scuffles broke out as Gardaí removed people by force to clear the thoroughfare and three men and a woman were arrested on public order offences.

Right2Water Ireland organised a fourth national demonstration in Dublin on 21 March 2015. This was attended by approximately 88000 people. Among those to speak at this event were MEP Lynn Boylan, TD Richard Boyd Barrett and Bernie Hughes, one of the activists jailed earlier that year.

On 18 April 2015, a march of approximately 15,000 people took place to protest water charges. The protest included a symbolic binning of water bills.

On 29 August 2015, a march of "tens of thousands" (80,000 according to organisers) marched in Dublin to protest water charges.

On 8 September 2015 the European Parliament report authored by MEP Lynn Boylan calling for the European Commission "to recognise that affordable access to water is a basic human right" was endorsed by a majority of MEPs.

On 23 January 2016, thousands of people flocked to 30 demonstrations across the country. On 20 February, a week before a general election, a further demonstration took place in Dublin. It was attended by 80,000 people including election candidates.

The Right2Water Ireland campaign announced a march in Dublin on 17 September 2016, citing its lack of faith in the expert panel set up by Government to oversee the issue and suggesting that the electorate, having given TDs a mandate to abolish Irish Water and taxes on water, remained angry that the matter had not been resolved.

== See also ==
- Right2Change
