= Luke Cheevers =

Irish singer

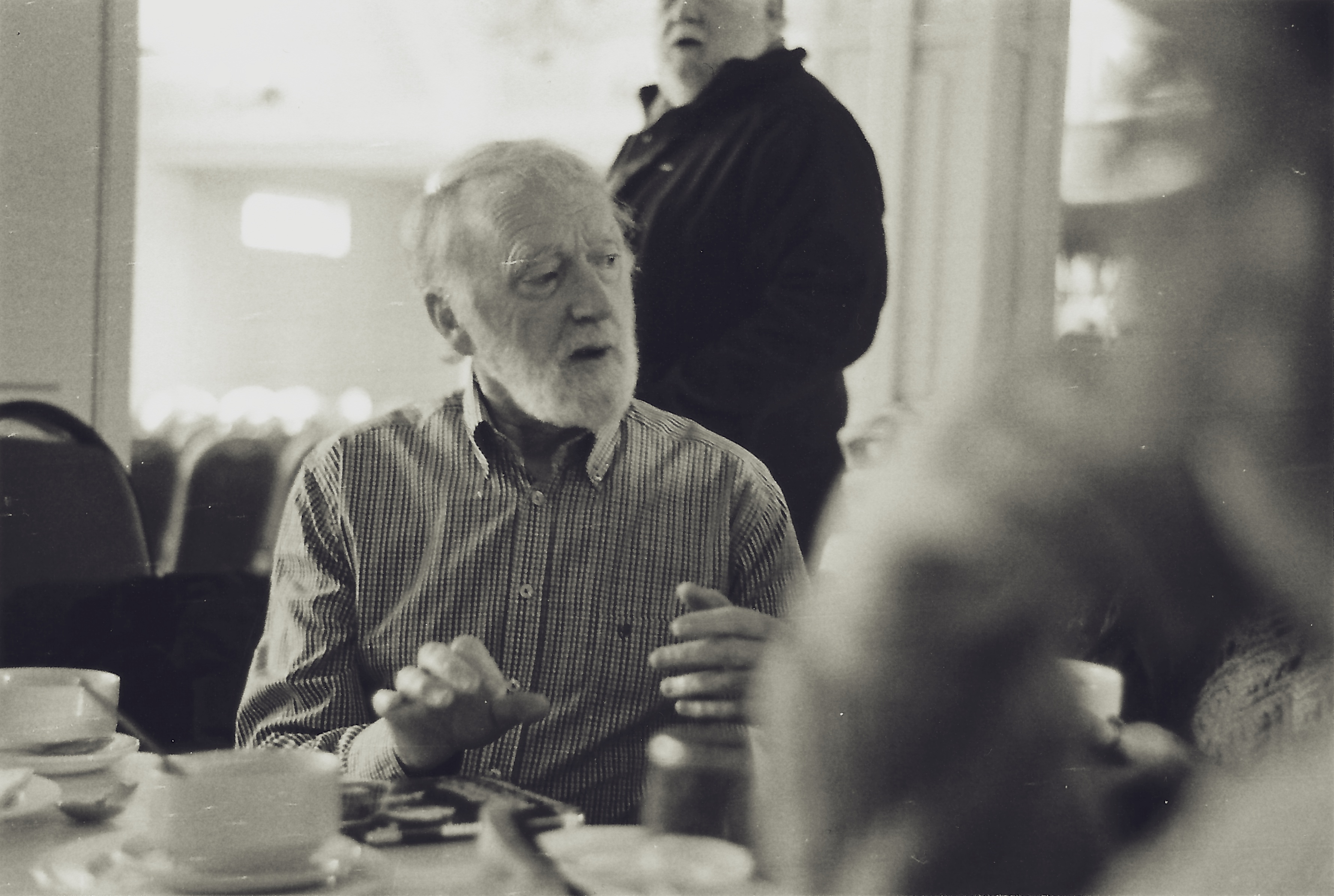
- Luke Cheevers, March 2014
- Born: 1 November 1940 (age 85); Dublin, Ireland
- Occupations: Window cleaner, Singer
- Years active: 1955–present

Luke Cheevers is a traditional Irish singer from Ringsend, Dublin, now living in the north side of the city. He is a member of An Goilin Singers Club in Dublin which was founded by Tim Dennehy and Donal De Barra in 1980. Cheevers is known for his distinctive Dublin repertoire and style.

== See also ==
- Traditional Irish Singers
- List of people from Dublin
