= Brian Trench =

- Born: 13 July 1945 (age 80)
- Citizenship: Irish
- Known for: Journalism and science communication
- Website: www.comms.dcu.ie/trenchb/

Brian Trench (born 13 July 1945) is a writer and academic living in Dublin, who has been centrally involved in developing science communication and science-in-society studies in Ireland.

== Early life ==
Brian Trench is the son of artist Bea Orpen and the founding secretary and former president of An Óige, Chalmers Edward FitzJohn ('Terry') Trench. He has two brothers and one sister. He has always been involved in left-wing activism and in 1969 joined the International Socialist in London. He was a leading member of the Socialist Workers' Movement in Dublin in the 1970s and joined the Socialist Labour Party in 1977 when Socialist Workers' Movement became a sub group within the newly formed political party.

== Career ==
=== Journalism ===
In 1972 he began working as a journalist and after the collapse of the Socialist Labour Party he began writing for Gralton, an Irish Socialist magazine in 1982. He was a full-time journalist for 20 years working on politics, foreign affairs, industrial relations, music (especially jazz), industry, technology (especially IT) and the media. He worked for many publications and broadcasters in print journalism, TV and radio.

=== Academia ===
In 1992 he joined Dublin City University while continuing to work as a freelance journalist. He founded the Masters in Science Communication at DCU, focussing on teaching Science and Society and Trends and Issues in Science Communication as part of the course. At DCU he pursued research interests that focussed on science on the Internet, models of science communication, science journalism and public engagement with science. When he retired in 2010 he was a senior lecturer in DCU and co-ordinated the Masters in Science Communication.

He has taken part in several EU-funded projects on science communication and he is a member of the scientific committee of the international PCST (Public Communication of Science and Technology) network. He was a member of the government advisory committee, Irish Council for Science Technology and Innovation, 1997-2003. He has been elected new President of the PCST Network in May 2014 at PCST 2014 in Salvador de Bahia, Brazil.

== Published works ==
Publications by Brian Trench include:

- Handbook of Public Communication of Science and Technology, co-edited with M. Bucchi, Routledge, 2009.
- Voluntary and community organizations in Ireland's "information society, with S. O'Donnell, Association for Voluntary Action Research in Ireland, 1999.
- Jargon Buster: a Guide to Information Technology, ICL, 1992.
- Magill Election 87, (editor), Magill, 1987.
- Magill Book of Politics, (editor), Magill, 1983.
- Trench Warfare: Crackdown on Plagiarism, (editor), Harper, 2002.
- Science blogs – glimpses behind the scenes, Yearbook of Sociology of Science (Springer, 2011)

There are further lists of selected publications on his personal website and on his DCU biography.

== See also ==
List of Dublin City University people
