= Irish Marxist Society =

The Irish Marxist Society (sometimes given as the Irish Marxist Group) was a Eurocommunist organisation active in Ireland in the 1970s.

The IMS was the result of a split in the Communist Party of Ireland. The Communist Party had always been reluctant to criticize the Soviet Union and consistently followed the Kremlin line. However, a number of party members were critical of the lack of democracy and civil liberties within the Soviet state. Following the 1968 Warsaw Pact invasion of Czechoslovakia, the party broke from the norm and denounced the invasion. Some of the more hard-line pro-Soviet members, such as Michael O'Riordan, were unhappy with this and sought to have the decision reversed in the early 1970s. By 1975 it looked likely that the stance on the invasion, which by now had a large symbolic significance, would indeed be reversed. For many of the more Soviet-critical members, this was the last straw. Twenty-two party members resigned, forming the Irish Marxist Society shortly thereafter. Among the people involved were Sam Nolan, Mick O'Reilly, Joe Deasy and Paddy Carmody.

The IMS denounced the party they left as ‘Stalinist’. On Stalin, the IMS said that ‘the harm which Stalin did to the world Socialist movement is incalculable’. The organization held that Russia and China had not yet been ready for a socialist revolution, but that one could work in some other countries. The IMS held that Marxists should be willing to ally with other forces, even outside the left, for the advancement of progressive causes. The need for democracy and civil liberties including freedom of speech was upheld. The IMS was strongly pro-feminist. On the issue of Northern Ireland and the Troubles, the IMS disagreed with the two-nations theory, but also held that the current focus should be on democracy and civil rights within Northern Ireland, not armed struggle for a united Ireland. The group was very much influenced by the Italian Communist Party.

The IMS's organizational structure has been described as ‘loose-knit’. It did not survive the end of the decade. Many of its members went on to join the Labour Party, where they joined with others to form Labour Left, which exercised a strong influence in the Labour Party through the 1980s against coalition and for socialist ideas.

== See also ==
- Eurocommunism
