= Snatch Me Out! =

2025 British television episode

- RuPaul's Drag Race UK episode
- Episode no.: Series 7 Episode 7
- Original air date: 6 November 2025

Guest appearances
- Susan Wokoma (guest judge); Jordan North

Episode chronology
← Previous —	Next → "The Hun Makeover"

"Snatch Me Out!" is the seventh episode of the seventh series of the British television show RuPaul's Drag Race UK. It originally aired on 6 November 2025. The episode's main challenge tasks the contestants with impersonating celebrities in a version of the Snatch Game. Susan Wokoma is a guest judge. Jordan North makes a guest appearance, participating in the Snatch Game, and former contestant Kitty Scott-Claus also makes a guest appearance in a recorded video. Bonnie Ann Clyde is declared the winner of the main challenge. Paige Three is eliminated from the competition.

== Episode ==
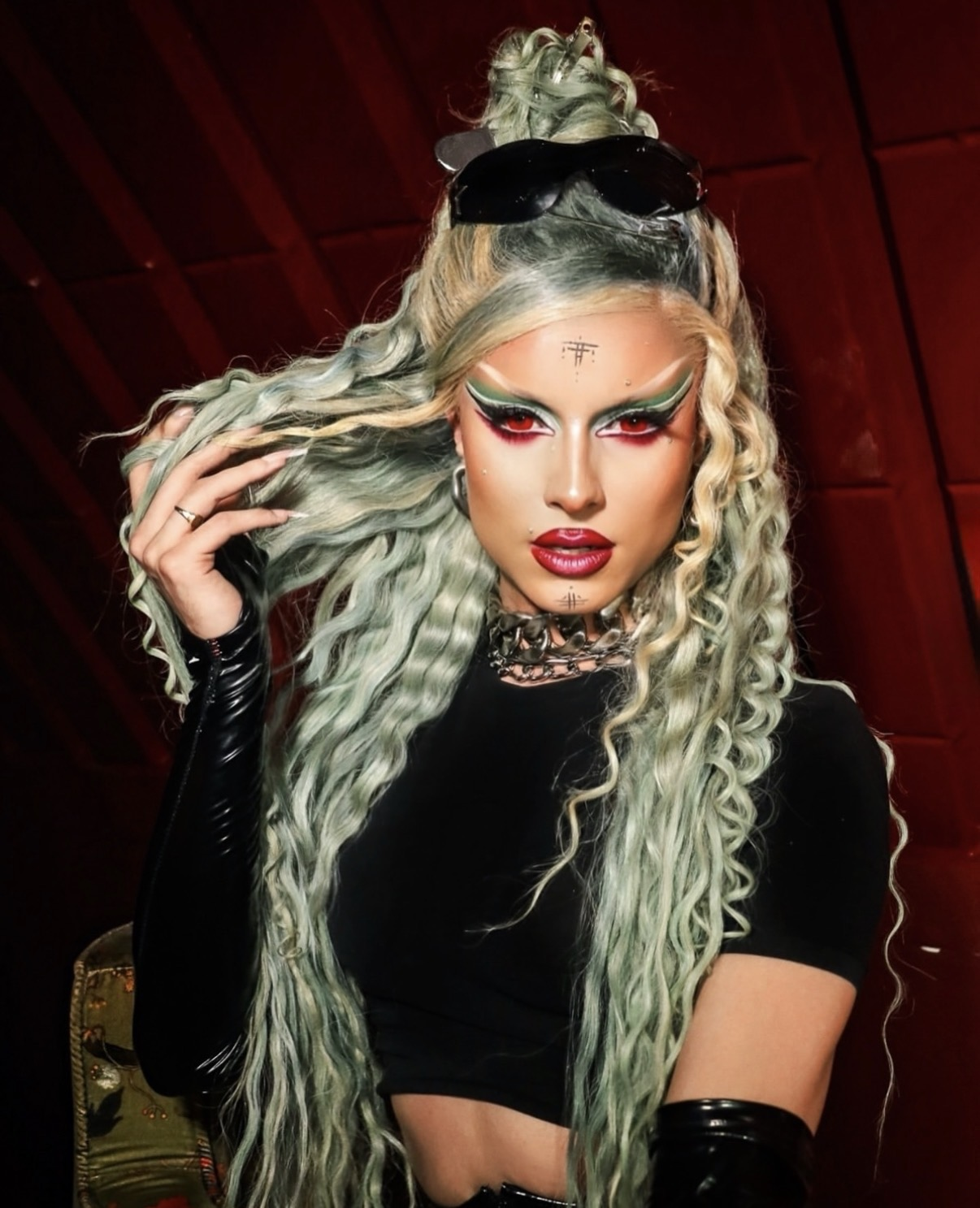
Bones wins the episodes main challenge.

The contestants enter the Werk Room after Sally TM's elimination on the previous episode. On a new day, RuPaul greets the group and reveals the mini-challenge, which tasks the contestants with "reading" (or playfully insulting) each other. Bones is declared the winner of the mini-challenge.

For the main challenge, the contestants are tasked with impersonating celebrities in a dating show variant of Snatch Game called "Snatch Me Out!" Following are the contestants and impersonated celebrities:

- Bones: Liam Gallagher
- Bonnie Ann Clyde: "Chair", impersonating Cher
- Catrin Feelings: Bonnie Tyler
- Elle Vosque: JoJo Siwa
- Paige Three: Alexa
- Sillexca Diction: Zoë Wanamaker as Cassandra from Doctor Who
- Tayris Mongardi: Matt Lucas as Precious Little from Come Fly with Me

RuPaul and the contestants play Snatch Game with Jordan North. Kitty Scott-Claus also makes a guest appearance in a recorded video. Back in the Werk Room, the contestants prepare for the fashion show. Bones describes her struggle with self-confidence.

On the main stage, RuPaul welcomes fellow judges Michelle Visage and Alan Carr, as well as guest judge Susan Wokoma. The runway category is "Holiday Ho Ho Ho's". The judges deliver their critiques, then deliberate while the contestants wait in the Untucked Lounge. Back on the main stage, Tayris Mongardi is declared safe. Bonnie Ann Clyde is named the winner of the main challenge. Catrin Feelings, Elle Vosque, and Sillexa Diction are also deemed safe. Bones and Paige Three place in the bottom and face off in a lip-sync contest to "Tainted Love" by Soft Cell. Bones is declared the winner of the lip-sync and Paige Three is eliminated from the competition.

== Production and broadcast ==
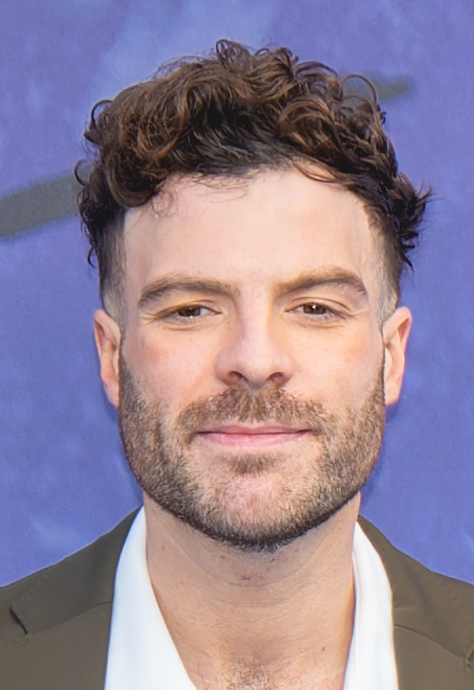
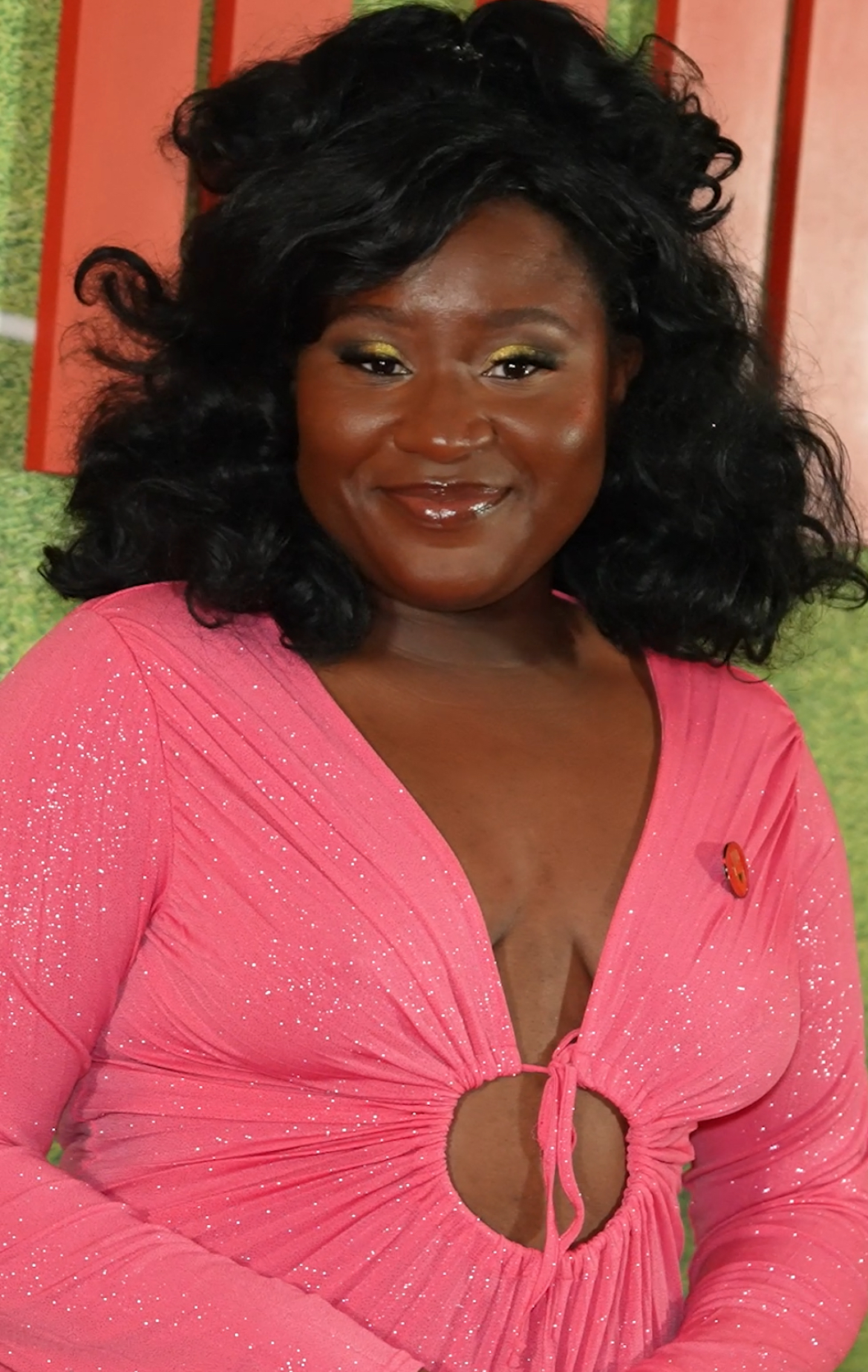
Jordan North (left) makes a guest appearance for the Snatch Game; Susan Wokoma (right) is a guest judge.

The episode originally aired on 6 November 2025.

=== Fashion ===
For the runway, Elle Vosque wears a candy cane-inspired red-and-white outfit. She carries a large candy cane. Sillexa Diction wears a blue dress and she opens a box to reveal a piece of coal. Bonnie Ann Clyde presents a gold-colored outfit. Tayris Mongardi wears a showgirl-inspired outfit with a large snowflake headpiece. Paige Three's nutcracker-inspired outfit is black and red. She wears a tall black hat and carries a "naughty list", which names Visage. Bones wears an outfit inspired by Mrs. Claus. She carries a teddy bear. Catrin Feelings also wears an outfit inspired by nutcrackers.

== Reception ==
Bonne Ann Clyde subsequently offered messages from "Chair" on Cameo.

== See also ==
- Cher as a gay icon
- Cultural impact of Cher
