= Jordan North =

English radio DJ, podcast host and television presenter (born 1990)

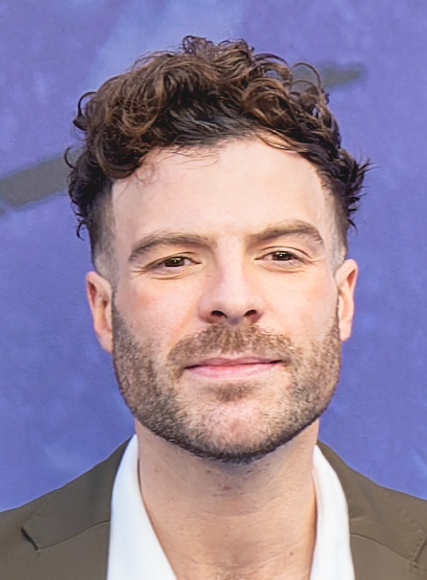
- North at the 2024 BFI London Film Festival premiere of That Christmas
- Born: Jordan Levi North; 14 February 1990 (age 36); York, North Yorkshire, England
- Education: University of Sunderland
- Occupations: Radio presenter; Television presenter; Podcaster; Author
- Employer(s): Global; BBC

Jordan Levi North (born 14 February 1990) is a British radio DJ and television presenter from York, England. Since April 2024, he has been the host of Capital Breakfast, and formerly hosted lunchtime and drivetime shows on BBC Radio 1.

In 2020, he finished as the runner-up of series 20 of I'm a Celebrity...Get Me Out of Here!.

== Early life ==
Jordan Levi North was born on 14 February 1990 in York. North grew up in Burnley, living in Harle Syke. He attended St James' Lanehead Primary School until the age of 11. After moving to the Preston area, North continued his education at Penwortham Priory Academy and then Preston College. He was born into a military family; his father Graham – who served in the Queen's Lancashire Regiment from 1982 to 2006 – and his brother Ryan – who serves in 2 PARA – are among nine close family members who have served in the army. He is of Welsh and Irish ancestry.

North is an alumnus of the University of Sunderland where he graduated in 2011 with a First Class degree in B.A. Media Production.

== Career ==
In 2011, working at Spark FM while at university, during the last year of his degree, North entered a Bauer Radio competition to find new talent, winning a Sunday show on The Hits Radio. He has also worked at the in-house radio station at Blackpool Pleasure Beach and community station Preston FM.

After leaving Spark and graduating from university, North worked as a researcher and producer at BBC Radio 5 Live. After recording a pilot show for Capital North East, he began presenting shows on Capital Manchester. He then spent 18 months working part-time at Rock FM before leaving the BBC when he was appointed as the Lancashire station's drive time presenter in May 2014.

After appearing as a freelance cover presenter in a number of BBC Radio 1 shows from 2014, he was one of a number of new voices picked to stand-in for Matt Edmondson during September 2017, and in early 2018 he was announced as the new host for the station's Greatest Hits show on Sunday mornings. From September 2020, he was announced as the new regular 11am-1pm weekend host on BBC Radio 1. North was also the main cover presenter for Scott Mills and Nick Grimshaw, occasionally known as Radio 1's "supply teacher".

Since March 2018, North has co-presented the comedy agony-aunt podcast Help I Sexted My Boss with friend and etiquette expert William Hanson. The show aims to offer advice to listeners who have encountered modern day problems. The podcast is currently in its thirteenth series (as of Dec 2025) and was nominated for Best Entertainment Podcast at the British Podcast Awards 2020. On 5 February 2020, North appeared on children's singing competition Got What It Takes? as a guest mentor during the programme's annual Radio 1 interview challenge. In November 2020, it was announced that North would take part in the twentieth series of I'm a Celebrity...Get Me Out of Here!. He finished second on 4 December 2020, with Giovanna Fletcher crowned the Queen of the Castle.

In 2021, North replaced Fearne Cotton to co-present the Christmas and New Year editions of Top of the Pops alongside Clara Amfo.

From 6 September 2021, North presented the BBC Radio 1 drivetime show with Vick Hope, taking over from Nick Grimshaw. It was announced on 16 February 2024 that North would be leaving Radio 1, with Jamie Laing joining Hope on Drivetime.

In February 2022, North joined Ant & Dec's Saturday Night Takeaway, appearing during the "Happiest Minute Of The Week" segment, surprising someone live with a "Gift on the Shift" in which they win a "Takeaway Getaway".

On 21 February 2024, Capital announced North as the new host of Capital Breakfast from April 2024, following the departure of Roman Kemp. In September 2025, it was announced that North would appear as a special guest in the seventh series of RuPaul's Drag Race UK (episode "Snatch Me Out!").

== Personal life ==
In July 2023, North was presented with an Honorary Fellowship by the University of Sunderland.

== Filmography ==
Year	Title	Role	Ref
2026	Toy Story 5	Garden Gnome (voice) (Ireland & UK release)	
