= Andrew Reed (police officer) =

Sir Andrew Reed
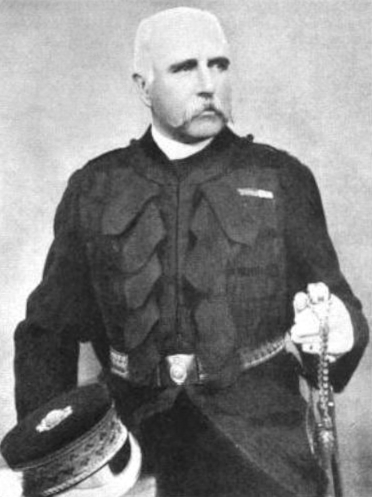
- In The Sketch, 14 March 1900
- Born: 26 September 1837; Galway, Ireland
- Died: 7 November 1914 (aged 77); Dublin, Ireland
- Burial place: Deans Grange Cemetery
- Occupation(s): Barrister, inspector-general
- Children: Hamilton Lyster Reed

Sir Andrew Reed KCB CVO JP (26 September 1837 – 7 November 1914) was an Anglo-Irish barrister and inspector-general of the Royal Irish Constabulary.

== Biography ==
Reed was born in Galway, Ireland, the son of John Reed of Galway and Mary Adamson of County Meath. He was educated at Queen's University Belfast and called to the Bar in 1873. He entered the Royal Irish Constabulary and was appointed District Inspector, 1859; became Inspector-General in 1885. He retired 1900.

Aside from being the only R.I.C. cadet officer to be promoted Inspector General, Reed changed the rules for promotion in the Royal Irish Constabulary. Up until his tenure, Catholics had little success in attaining promotions. Even though most of the force was Catholic, almost all the officers were non-Catholic. Reed instituted a rule that each year, 60 men who were Catholic and passed the Sergeant's exam would be promoted.

He was appointed a Knight Bachelor in 1889, a Companion of the Order of the Bath (CB) in 1892, a Commander of the Royal Victorian Order (CVO) in 1900 and a Knight Commander of the Order of the Bath (KCB) in 1897.

His son Major General Hamilton Lyster Reed was awarded the Victoria Cross for his bravery in the Second Boer War.

Reed died in Dublin in November 1914 and is buried in Deans Grange Cemetery. His epitaph reads: - "I have no greater joy than to hear that my children walk in truth." (3 John 4.)

Coat of arms of Andrew Reed
Notes Granted 23 November 1909 by Nevile Wilkinson, Ulster King of Arms. Crest A griffin segreant Or charged with a trefoil slipped Gules. Torse Of the colours. Escutcheon Or on a chevron between three garbs Gules as many trefoils slipped Argent. Motto Memor Et Fidelis
