= John Doyle (academic, born 1964) =

John Doyle (born June 1964) is an academic of politics, international relations, and conflict studies at Dublin City University (DCU). Professor John Doyle is current Vice President for Research and was previously the Director of DCU's International Conflict Resolution and Reconstruction Institute.

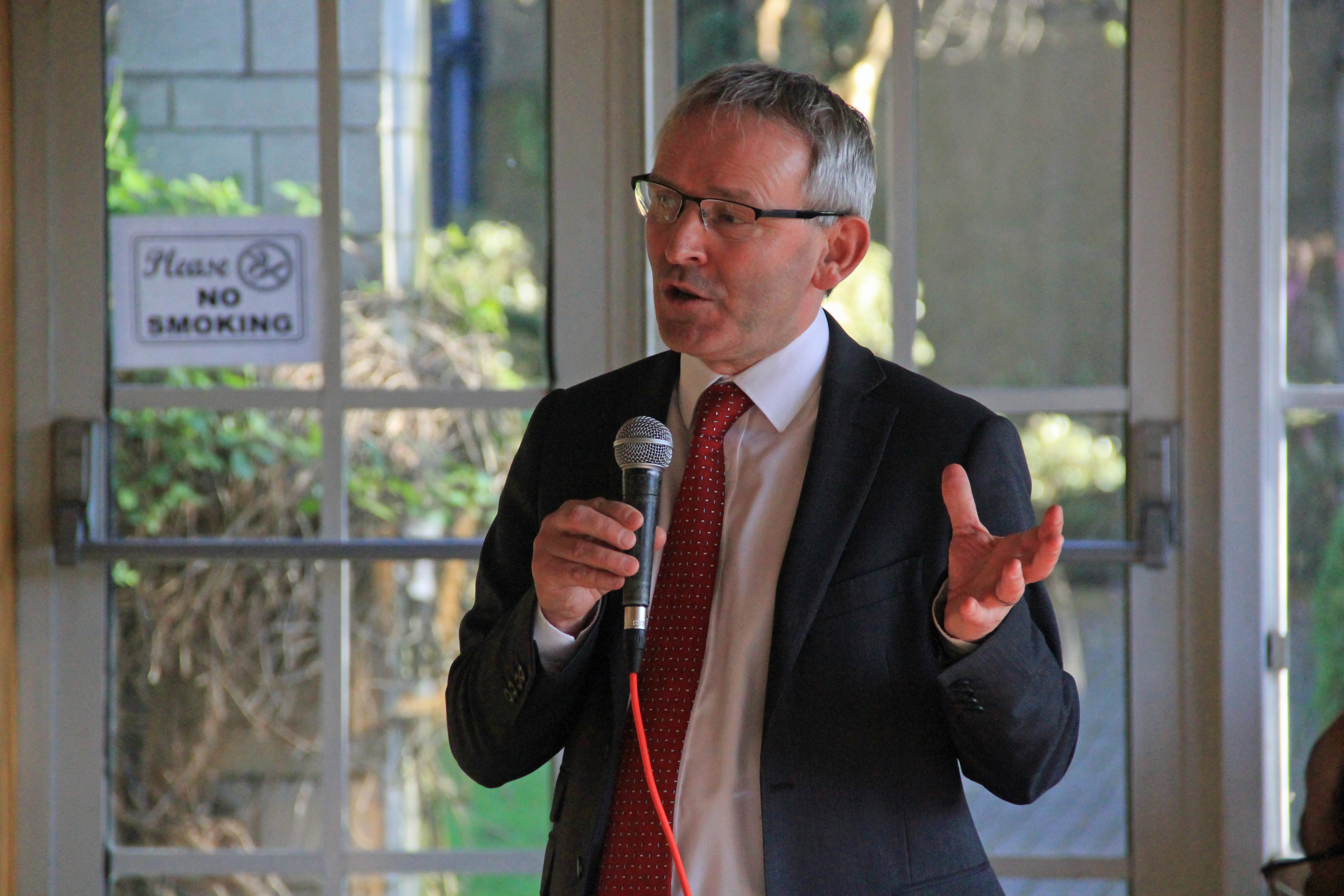

== Career ==
John Doyle complete a master's degree in University College Dublin in 1992 in politics focusing on fair employment in Northern Ireland. He then pursued his PhD at Queen's University, Belfast, researching Ulster Unionist attitudes towards equality issues in Northern Ireland and graduated in 1999.

Doyle was hired by Dublin City University (DCU) in 1997 to the then School of Business as a lecturer on the new International Relations masters programme. Doyle was then among those who founded the School of Law and Government in 2003 and went on to be Head of School by 2007. In 2012, Doyle became Executive Dean for the Faculty of Humanities and Social Sciences. Later in 2012, Doyle of the founding Director of the Institute for International Conflict Resolution and Reconstruction (IICRR) launched by Hillary Clinton.

In 2022, Doyle was appointed as Vice President of Research in DCU, overseeing strategic leadership of DCU's research community.

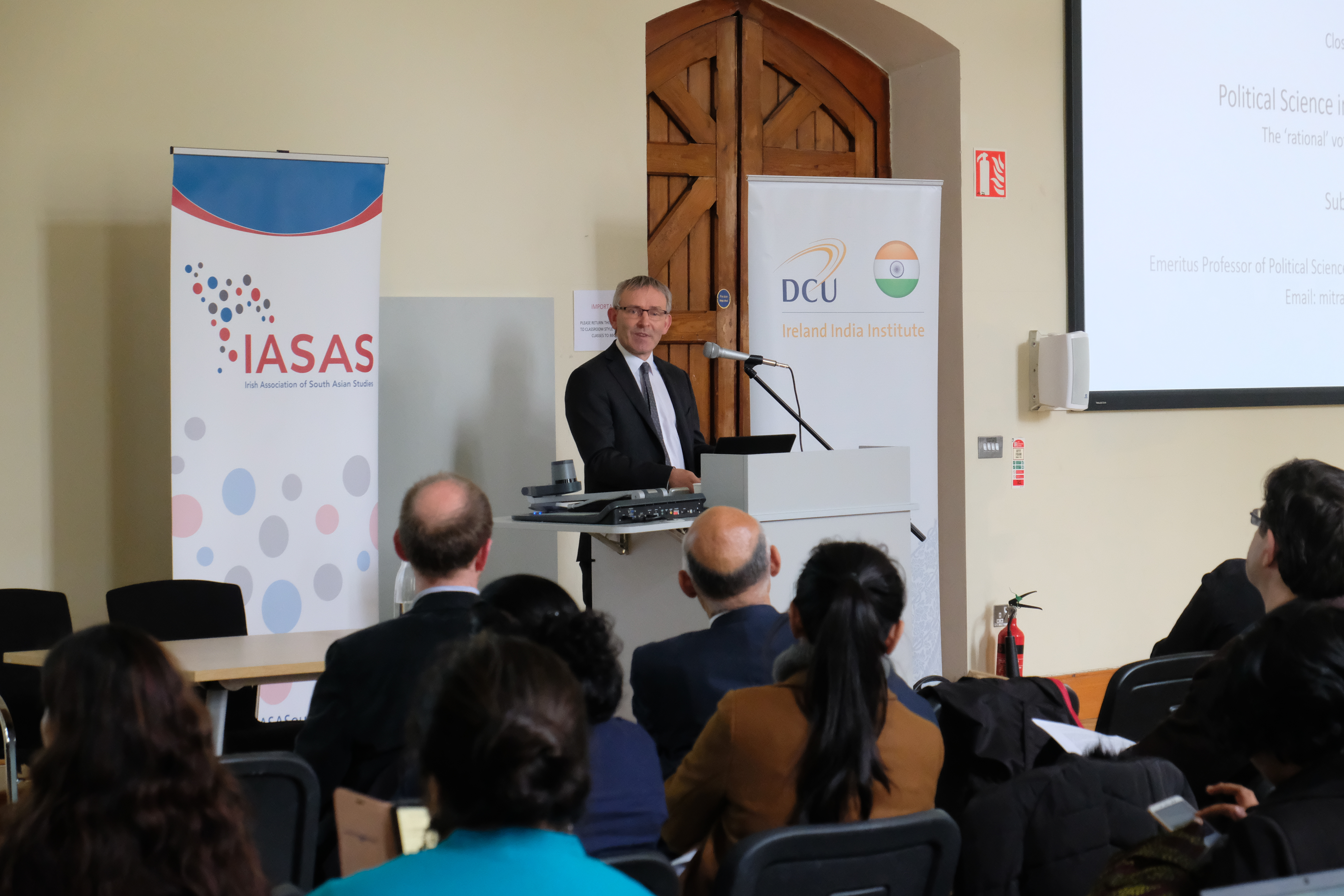

== Published Work ==
Publications by Prof John Doyle include:

- Policing the Narrow Ground: lessons learned from the transformation of policing in Northern Ireland (2010) Royal Irish Academy
- Irish Foreign Policy edited with Ben Tonra, Michael Kennedy, and Noel Dorr (2012) Royal Irish Academy and Gill and Macmillan
- Routledge Handbook of State Recognition edited with Gëzim Visoka and Edward Newman (2019) London: Routledge
- Peace, Security and Defence Cooperation in Post-Brexit Europe. edited with Cornelia-Adriana Baciu (2019) Heidelberg: Springer Nature.
- 'Why the "subvention" does not matter: Northern Ireland and the all-Ireland economy', Irish Studies in International Affairs 32 (2) (2021), pg. 314–34.

== See also ==
- List of Dublin City University people
