= Helena Sheehan =

Irish philosopher and historian of science

Helena Sheehan is an Irish philosopher, historian of science, philosophy, culture and politics. Sheehan is professor emeritus at Dublin City University, where she taught media studies and history of ideas in the School of Communications. She was a visiting professor at the University of Cape Town and Peking University on several occasions. She has been active on the left since the 1960s. She has given many conference papers and public lectures in universities and other bodies in USA, USSR, GDR, Mexico, Canada, Ireland, UK, France, Germany, Italy, Czechoslovakia, Yugoslavia, Greece, China and South Africa.

== Biography ==
Born in the United States in 1944, Sheehan describes her childhood as Catholic and conservative, She began her university studies and taught primary school as a nun. She left the convent in 1965 and became an agnostic and liberal, then an atheist and radical.

Sheehan graduated with a BS in 1967 from St. Joseph's University in Philadelphia, followed by an MA in 1970 from Temple University in Philadelphia. Sheehan attended the International Lenin School in Moscow, Soviet Union in 1977-1978. She earned a PhD in 1980 from Trinity College (Dublin) in philosophy.

Sheehan became active on the new left in the US in the 1960s. In Ireland, she joined Sinn Féin (Official) in 1972 and then the Communist Party of Ireland in 1975. She chaired the Trinity College Dublin Communist Society. She joined the Labour Party in 1981, where she was a founder of Labour Left. Since 2011, she has belonged to no party, but has remained active on the left. She organised Occupy University during Occupy Dame Street in 2011. She travelled often to Greece and became involved with Syriza, writing about this in The Syriza Wave published in 2017. An autobiographical work entitled Navigating the Zeitgeist was published in 2019 with a sequel Until We Fall published in 2023.

As a philosopher and historian of science, Sheehan writes from a Marxist perspective. She argues that Marx and Engels shared fundamentally the same view on the philosophy of science and written critically of Lysenkoism and Stalin's impact on scientific development, while stressing the necessity of understanding such trends in full socio-historical context. She is a strong critic of both positivism and postmodernism.

Sheehan has lectured at the Humanist Association of Ireland.

In her personal life, Sheehan was the partner of the trade unionist Sam Nolan.

== Quotes ==
- On her life:
  "Sometimes I feel as if I have lived eons in a matter of decades. The wave of historical change, such as swept over centuries in the past, seem to have swept through my world several times over already. And who knows what I have yet to see? I am perhaps only halfway through the time I may expect my life to be." [1988]
- On Marxism:
  "Whatever Marxism is, it is systemic analysis and historical perspective. It is a totalising (not totalised) philosophy of history. It is the only mode of thought able to give a coherent, comprehensive, and credible account of the complexity of contemporary experience. It is the only coherent analysis of the capitalist mode of production and how it structurally generates, not only the maximum expropriation of surplus value, but maximum dissolution of social bonds, involving decreasing access to totality and increasing atomisation of thought processes. It is the only credible analysis of an alternative mode of production, proposing socialism, not only as a radical restructuring of the relations of production, but as a fundamental transformation of patterns of thought and forms of social organisation."
- On Marxism and science:
  "Marxism has made the strongest claims of any intellectual tradition before or since about the socio-historical character of science, yet always affirmed its cognitive achievements. Science was seen as inextricably enmeshed with economic systems, technological developments, political movements, philosophical theories, cultural trends, ethical norms, ideological positions, indeed all that was human. It was also a path of access to the natural world."
- On Lysenkoism:
  "What went wrong was that the proper procedures for coming to terms with such complex issues were short-circuited by grasping for easy slogans and simplistic solutions and imposing them by administrative fiat.
- On the fall of communism:
  "These are the days of our defeat, we ought not to pretend otherwise, but defeat is not death.
- On the death of communism:
  "The socialist experiment has been portrayed as having played itself out and finally thrown up leaders who have seen the superiority of the capitalist way and decided to go for it. The world is 'going our way', the leaders of 'the free world' have declared. The iron curtain has come tumbling down. The Kremlin has been conquered without a single marine opening fire, without a single ICBM being launched. It unravels before me like a nightmare. No more the red flags flying. No more the heads held high and the fists clenched and the voices raised to the strains of The International. No more the larger-than-life murals of workers and soldiers and peasants marching into the future shaping the world with the labour of their hands and hearts and minds. Now it is to be Mickey Mouse and Coca Cola and Michael Jackson and Sacchi & Sacchi."

== Works ==
=== Books ===
Books by Sheehan include:

- Until We Fall: Long Distance Life on the Left, Monthly Review Press, 2023
- Navigating the Zeitgeist: A Story of the Cold War, the New Left, Irish Republicanism, and International Communism, Monthly Review Press, 2019
- The Syriza Wave: Surging and Crashing with the Greek Left, Monthly Review Press, 2017
- Marxism and the Philosophy of Science: A Critical History, Humanities Press, 1985, 1993, Verso Books, 2017
- European Socialism: A Blind Alley or a Long and Winding Road?, MSF, 1992
- Has the Red Flag Fallen?, Attic Press, 1989
- Irish Television Drama: A Society and Its Stories, Radio Telefís Éireann, 1987, Four Courts Press, 2004
- The Continuing Story of Irish Television Drama: Tracking the Tiger, Four Courts Press, 2004

=== Articles ===
In academic journals (peer-reviewed):

- Is history a coherent story? Critical Legal Thinking February 2012
- The Wire and the world: Narrative and metanarrative Jump Cut 51, 2009
- Contradictory transformations: Observations on the intellectual dynamics of South African universities Journal of Critical Education Policy Studies 7, 1, 2009
- Marxism and science studies: A sweep through the decades International Studies in the Philosophy of Science 21, 2, 2007
- JD Bernal: Politics, philosophy and the science of science Journal of Physics 57, 2007
- Fair City . Journal of Irish Studies January 2006
- Grand narratives then and now: Can we still conceptualise history? Socialism and Democracy 12, 1998
- On public service broadcasting: Against the tide Irish Communications Review 2, 1992
- The parameters of the permissible: How Scrap Saturday got away with it Irish Communications Review 2, 1992
- Writing and the zeitgeist. Irish University Review 21, 1991

In political journals:

- Totality and Decades of Debate and the Return of Nature Monthly Review 76, 4, 2023
- The Disinformation Wars: An Epistemological, Political and Socio-Historical Interrogation Monthly Review 75, 4, 2023
- Return of the Dialectics of Nature Debate Monthly Review 74, 4, 2022
- Marxism, Science and Science Studies: From Marx and Engels to Covid-19 and Cop-26 Monthly Review 74,1, 2022
- When the old world unravelled Jacobin 29, 2018
- As the world turned upside down Monthly Review 69, 3, 2017
- Centenary of Christopher Caudwell'. Communist Review 50 Spring 2008
- "IRELAND: Don't forget Dublin!". Green Left Weekly, February 2003

=== Book reviews ===
- T he Synthesising Impulse Monthly Review, October 2021
- Between Science and Society Monthly Review, March 2018
- Closed Rooms and Class War Jacobin, July 2017
- South Africa Pushed to the Limit Monthly Review, November 2011
- Religion and the Human Prospect Science & Society, October 2009
- Popular Television Drama: Critical Perspectives European Journal of Communication, June 2006
- The Drama of the Science Wars: What is the Plot?' Public Understanding of Science, April 2001
- 'Ecological Roots: Which Go Deepest?' Monthly Review, October 2000
- Questioning Ireland Irish Political Studies 2000
- Ideological Analysis and the Alternatives Irish Communications Review, 5, 1995

=== Miscellaneous ===
Introductions:

- Bukharin, Nikolai. Philosophical Arabesques. New York: Monthly Review Press, 2005

Pamphlets and articles:

- 'Communism and the Emancipation of Women'. (Communist Party of Ireland, 1976)
- 'The centenary of Christopher Caudwell and the philosophical landscape of the century' (2007)

== See also ==
- List of Dublin City University people
