= William Hanson (author) =

British etiquette consultant (born 1989)

William Hanson FRSA
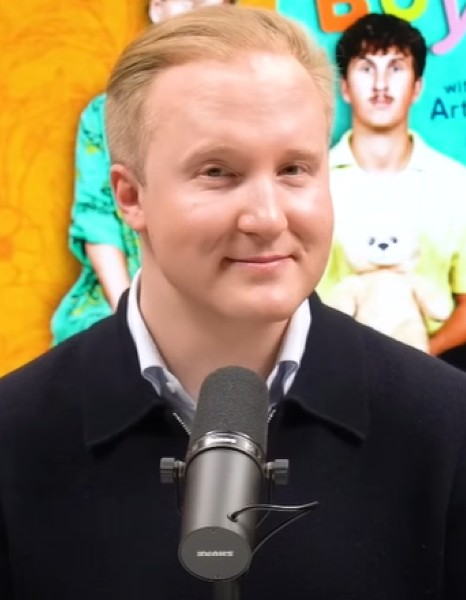
- Hanson in 2024
- Born: 2 September 1989 (age 37); Bristol, England
- Education: Clifton College
- Alma mater: University of Manchester
- Occupations: Company director (The English Manner), author, podcaster, etiquette coach
- Notable work: Help I Sexted My Boss (podcast); Help I S*xted My Boss: A Hilarious Guide to Avoiding Life's Awkward Moments (author); Protocol to Manage Relationships Today (author); Just Good Manners (author)
- Spouse: Mikey Worrall (m. 2022)
- Website: williamhanson.co.uk

William Richard Henry Hanson (born 2 September 1989) is a British etiquette coach, author and podcast host. He is best known for his podcast Help I Sexted My Boss, which he co-hosts with Jordan North. He also hosts The Luxury Podcast (formerly known as Keeping Up Appearances: The Luxury Podcast), which he co-hosts with Jonathan Vernon-Smith. Hanson is owner of The English Manner, an etiquette and protocol coaching company.

== Early years and education ==
William Richard Henry Hanson was born on 2 September 1989 in Bristol, England. His father was a property developer and land agent, and his mother a retail manager at House of Fraser. He boarded at Clifton College, a public school in Bristol, from 1996 to 2008 before attending the University of Manchester from 2008 to 2011.

== Career ==
Hanson joined The English Manner, an etiquette and protocol coaching company, in 2008. He became the owner of the company in 2019. Hanson has appeared on various news outlets as an etiquette coach, including an appearance as a mystery guest in a 2011 episode of Russell Howard's Good News. He is also credited as being an etiquette advisor on Red, White & Royal Blue (2023).

On 20 March 2018, Hanson, with co-host Jordan North, began the podcast Help I Sexted My Boss. In April 2024, one night of their live-show inspired by the podcast was thought to be the first British podcast to be live-streamed from the London Palladium and shown in British, Irish and European cinemas. In November 2019, he was a visiting lecturer at the Georgetown University in Qatar teaching etiquette.

On 11 February 2021, the Acast-hosted podcast The Luxury Podcast (previously called Keeping Up Appearances: The Luxury Podcast) began with co-host Jonathan Vernon-Smith; it has since released 114 episodes as of 12 August 2025.

In May 2026, it was announced that Hanson will be joining the cast of the musical Titanique as Ruth DeWitt Bukater for a six-week run in London's Criterion Theatre from 9 June 2026.

Hanson's first novel, A Fatal Forking, is set to be released on 20 May 2027.

== Personal life ==
Hanson came out as gay at the age of 16. He married Michael Worrall on 16 September 2022.

== Works ==
=== Books ===
- Bluffer's Guide to Etiquette (2014), Bluffer's Guides, William Hanson
- Bluffer's Guide to Entertaining: Instant Wit and Wisdom (2019), Bluffer's Guides, William Hanson
- Protocol to Manage Relationships Today (2020), Amsterdam University Press, William Hanson and Jean Paul Wijers
- Help I S*xted My Boss (2023), Century, William Hanson and Jordan North
- Just Good Manners (2024), Century, William Hanson
- Just Good Manners (2025), Gallery, William Hanson
- Einfach Gute Manieren (2025), Riva, William Hanson
- Le Guide - So british - des bonnes manières (2026), Albin Michel, William Hanson
- A Fatal Forking (2027), William Hanson

=== Podcasts ===
- Help I Sexted My Boss, (2018), William Hanson and Jordan North.
- The Luxury Podcast (formerly known as Keeping Up Appearances: The Luxury Podcast), (2021), William Hanson and Jonathan Vernon-Smith.

=== Board games ===
- Help I S*xted My Boss: The Official Party Game (2024), Lucky Egg
