= Riordan =

Riordan is a surname of Irish origin (Irish: Ó Ríordáin, traditionally: Ó Ríoghbhardáin); Rearden and Reardon are variants of it. From rí, which means "king" and bard which means "poet", Riordan means "royal poet". In Irish tradition, the poet was very highly regarded in any royal household, as he acted as a scholar, historian and advisor to the king.

== People with the name ==
- Ann Fienup-Riordan (born 1948), American cultural anthropologist
- Bill Riordan (1908–1973), Australian politician from Queensland; minister for the navy 1946–1949
- Daniel J. Riordan (1870–1923), American politician from New York; U.S. representative 1899–1923
- Daniel Riordan (born 1984), Irish professional rugby union player
- Daniel Riordan (born 1958), American voice actor
- Darby Riordan (1888–1936), Australian politician from Queensland; member of the House of Representatives 1929–36
- Derek Riordan (born 1983), Scottish professional football player
- Fergus Riordan (born 1997), Spanish actor
- Hugh D. Riordan (1932–2005), American psychiatrist and medical researcher
- James Riordan (1936–2012), English novelist, broadcaster, sports historian, association football player and Russian scholar
- Joe Riordan (1930–2012), Australian politician and government minister
- John Riordan (banker), American banker who rescued 105 South Vietnamese
- John Riordan (mathematician) (1903–1988), American mathematician and author
- Linda Riordan (born 1953), British politician; MP from Halifax since 2005
- Maurice Riordan (born 1953), Irish poet, translator, and editor
- Michael H. Riordan (born 1951), American economics professor
- Michael L. Riordan (born 1957), the founder and CEO/Chairman (1987–1997) of biotechnology company Gilead Sciences
- Michael Riordan (physicist) (born 1946), American physicist and author
- Mike Riordan (basketball) (born 1945), American professional basketball player
- Pat Riordan (born 1979), Canadian rugby union player
- Patrick William Riordan (1841–1914), American Roman Catholic archbishop
- Paul F. Riordan (1920–1944), American army officer; recipient of the Medal of Honor
- Richard Riordan (1930–2023), American politician from California; mayor of Los Angeles 1993–2001
- Richard Riordan (Australian politician) (born 1972), Australian politician
- Riordan (DJ), British DJ and record producer
- Rick Riordan (born 1964), American author
- Steva Riordan (1876–after 1908), Irish hurler
- Terry Riordan (born 1973), American professional lacrosse player
- Tim Riordan (born 1960), American football player
- William F. Riordan (1941–2020), Justice of the New Mexico Supreme Court

=== Fictional characters ===
- Dallas Riordan, character in the Marvel Comics universe.
- Nita Riordan, character in Louis L'Amour's Kilkenny books.
- The Riordans, a 1960s–70s soap opera on RTÉ (Irish television)

== See also ==
- O'Riordan, a surname
