= Sam Nolan =

Irish trade unionist (1930–2024)

Sam Nolan (1930 – 14 April 2024) was an Irish trade unionist and politician activist who was the secretary of the Dublin Council of Trade Unions.

== Biography ==
Born in Dublin, Nolan became active in the Irish Workers' League soon after World War II, and was a member of its executive committee by 1952. In 1957, he became a member of the executive of the new Unemployed Protest Committee, and was initially considered the most prominent figure in the movement. At the 1957 Irish general election, he was asked to stand for the committee in Dublin South-Central, but refused, believing that anti-communist feeling following the Soviet invasion of Hungary made him an unsuitable candidate. Instead, the movement stood Jack Murphy, who was elected.

During the 1960s, Nolan was prominent in the Dublin Housing Action Committee, while he also remained active in the Irish Workers' League. He stood as a candidate at the 1969 Irish general election in Dublin Central, but took only 242 votes and was not elected. In 1970, the Workers' League merged with the Communist Party of Northern Ireland to form the Communist Party of Ireland (CPI), and Nolan was elected as its first Deputy General Secretary.

In January 1976, Nolan resigned from the CPI alongside Joe Deasy, Paddy Carmody, George Jeffares, Mick O'Reilly and others, in protest at the party's change of line on the Soviet invasion of Czechoslovakia, which they opposed. They subsequently formed the Eurocommunist Irish Marxist Society, although this was short-lived, and Nolan soon joined the Labour Party, where he was a founder of Labour Left. He was elected to the Labour Party's Administrative Council, and became a full-time organiser for the Union of Construction, Allied Trades and Technicians.

Nolan was elected as the Secretary of the Dublin Council of Trade Unions in 1979, holding the post into the 2010s.

In his personal life, Nolan was the partner of academic Helena Sheehan.

A biography of Nolan was written by Brian Kenny and published in 2010.

Nolan died on 14 April 2024, at the age of 93.

Trade union offices
Preceded by Paddy Carmody	Secretary of the Dublin Council of Trade Unions; 1979–2023	Succeeded by Des Derwin
