= Theodore David Wallace =

Irish barrister and colonial administrator (1906–1952)

The Honourable Theodore David Wallace KC

Attorney-General of Tanganyika
- In office 1951 – 1952 (died in office)

Attorney-General of North Borneo
- In office 1947–1951

Personal details
- Born: 1906
- Died: 1 January 1952 (aged 45–46) Dar es Salaam
- Children: 2

Theodore David Wallace (1906 – 1 January 1952) was an Irish barrister and colonial administrator who was attorney-general of North Borneo and Tanganyika.

== Early life and education ==
Wallace was born in 1906 in Dublin, the fourth son of Octavius Wallace, a barrister of Dublin. He was educated at St Andrew's College, Dublin, King's College Cambridge and Trinity College Dublin and was called to the Irish bar in 1929.

== Career ==
Wallace began his career practising on the Munster circuit. In 1934, he joined the Colonial Legal Service and went to Kenya as crown counsel and later acted as solicitor general. In 1939, he went to Malaya as crown counsel, Straits Settlements, served as assistant legal adviser of the Federated Malay States, and deputy public prosecutor, handling cases on behalf of the Crown. In 1941, he sat on the committee established to investigate corruption in Singapore generally. He played a leading role in organising the civil defence of Singapore. During the Japanese occupation he was interned in Singapore from 1942 to 1945. In 1946, he returned to Malaya and sat as a judge presiding over prosecutions of Japanese kempeitai and passing the death sentence. In the following year he was appointed Attorney-General of North Borneo and gazetted as KC in 1950. In 1951, he was appointed Attorney-General of Tanganyika but died after serving only eight days in the post.

== Personal life and death ==
Wallace was a keen sportsman who played rugby and tennis and represented Cambridge at water polo.

Wallace married Margaret Pearson in 1947 and they had two children.

Wallace died suddenly on 1 January 1952 in Dar es Salaam, Tanganyika (today Tanzania).
