= Robert O'Riordan =

Canadian writer

Robert O'Riordan (November 2, 1943 – February 16, 2004) was a Canadian author best known for his Cadre trilogy. He was an English teacher at Sir Robert Borden High School in the Nepean suburb of Ottawa, Ontario, Canada.

== Bibliography ==
=== Novels ===
- 1985 – Cadre One
- 1987 – Cadre Lucifer
- 1988 – Cadre Messiah
