= Rachel Costello =

Dublin camogie player

Personal information
- Native name: Rachel Ní Choisdealbha (Irish)
- Born: 1991 (age 34–35) Dublin, Ireland

Sport
- Sport: Camogie
Club*
Years	Club	Apps (scores)
	Naomh Fionnbarra	?
Inter-county**
Years	County	Apps (scores)
	Dublin	?
- * club appearances and scores correct as of (16:31, 30 December 2009 (UTC)). **Inter County team apps and scores correct as of (16:31, 30 December 2009 (UTC)).

Rachel Costello is an Irish camogie player who made her senior debut for Dublin in 2009. She represented Dublin at senior, Junior and Minor levels in 2009. With the Naomh Fionnbarra club in Cabra, she won an Intermediate championship title.

She moved to Australia.

Her father Anthony played senior hurling for Dublin and in 2009 scored the winning goal for Naomh Fionnbarra in the Dublin Intermediate championship final when coming on as a substitute.
