= Hamilton Reed =

British Army general and recipient of the Victoria Cross

Major-General Hamilton Reed VC CB CMG
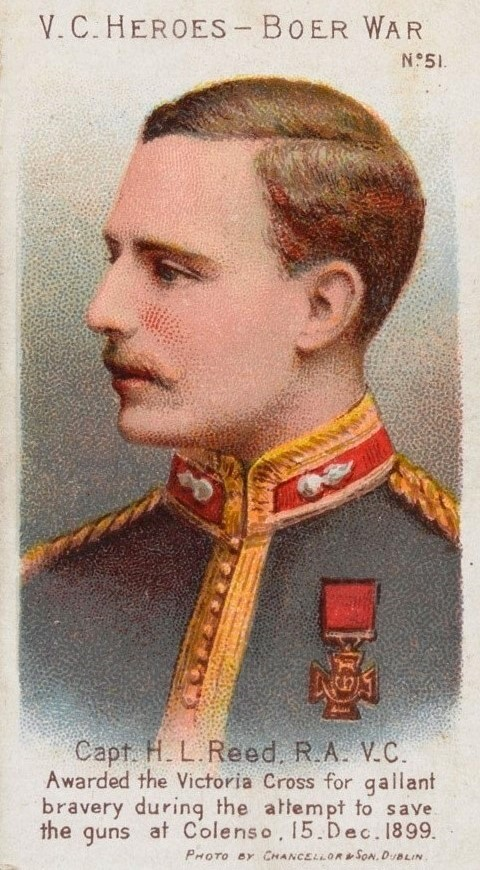
- Reed depicted on a cigarette card
- Born: 23 May 1869; Dublin, Ireland
- Died: 7 March 1931 (aged 61); South Kensington, London
- Burial place: East Sheen Cemetery
- Relatives: Sir Andrew Reed (father); Harry Hammon Lyster VC (uncle)
- Military career
- Allegiance: United Kingdom
- Branch: British Army
- Service years: 1888–1927
- Rank: Major-General
- Units: Royal Artillery
- Commands: 15th (Scottish) Division; 52nd (Lowland) Division
- Conflicts: Second Boer War; First World War
- Awards: Victoria Cross; Order of the Bath; Order of St Michael and St George; Legion of Honour (France); Croix de Guerre (France)

Major-General Hamilton Lyster Reed, VC, CB, CMG (23 May 1869 – 7 March 1931) was an Irish British Army officer, and recipient of the Victoria Cross, the highest and most prestigious award for gallantry in the face of the enemy that can be awarded to British and Commonwealth forces.

== Early life ==
Born in Dublin, he was the son of Sir Andrew Reed, a senior police official. He was educated at the Royal Military Academy, Woolwich, and gazetted into the Royal Field Artillery as a second lieutenant on 17 February 1888.

== Military career ==
Reed was promoted to lieutenant on 17 February 1891, and to captain on 14 September 1898. Following the outbreak of the Second Boer War in late 1899, he went to South Africa on active service. He took part in the Ladysmith Relief Force, including the Battle of Colenso on 15 December 1899, where he was wounded.

=== Details on Victoria Cross ===
He was a 30 years old captain in 7th Battery, Royal Field Artillery during the battle of Colenso on 15 December 1899. The detachments serving the guns of the 14th and 66th Batteries, Royal Field Artillery, had all been either killed, wounded, or driven from their guns by Infantry fire at close range, and the guns were deserted. His citation mentions the following deed, for which he was awarded the VC:

Captain Reed, who had heard of the difficulty, shortly afterwards brought down three teams from his battery to see if he could be of any use. He was wounded, as were five of the thirteen men who rode with him, one was killed; and thirteen out of twenty-one horses were killed before he got half-way to the guns, and he was obliged to retire.

== Second Boer War ==
After the end of regular warfare, the war turned into a guerrilla war in late 1900. During the later part of the war, Reed, a divisional adjutant in March 1900, served as a staff officer, in the position of deputy assistant adjutant general for intelligence from 12 June 1901.

The war ended in June 1902. Reed left Cape Town in the SS Dilwara in late July, and arrived in Southampton the following month. He returned to the Royal Artillery as a regular officer in January 1903. In September 1906 he was seconded for service on the staff and made a staff captain at headquarters. In August 1907 he succeeded Major William Furse as a general staff officer, grade 2 there.

== Further military service ==
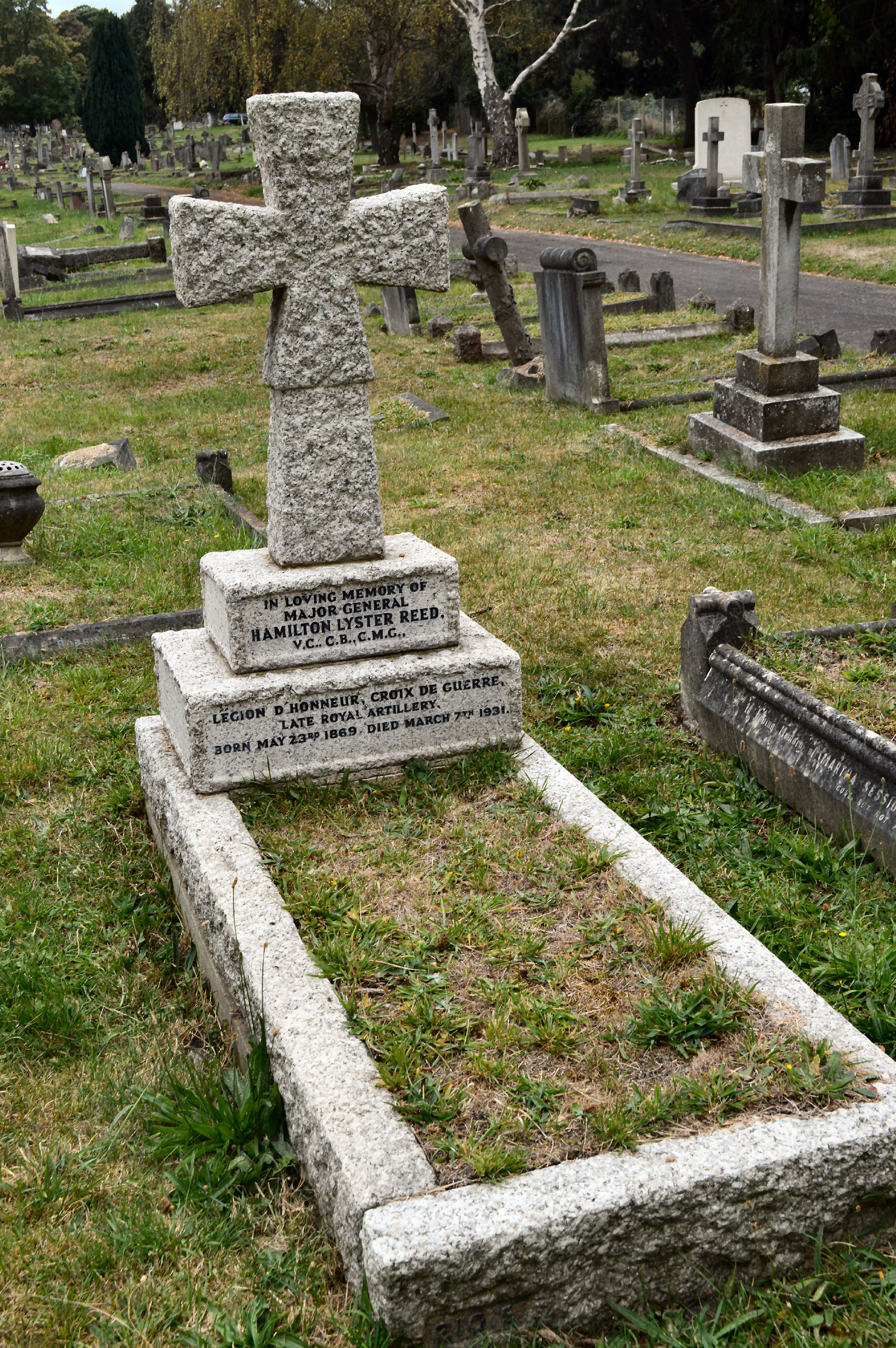
East Sheen Cemetery.

In September 1910 he served as a general staff officer, grade 2 (GSO2) and was granted the temporary rank of lieutenant colonel while holding this appointment. Reed was a temporary military attaché, for which he was once again promoted to temporary lieutenant colonel, with the Turkish Army during the Balkan Wars of 1912–13. In September 1913 he was made a GSO2. He was promoted to brevet lieutenant colonel in February 1914, while serving as a GSO2 with Eastern Command.

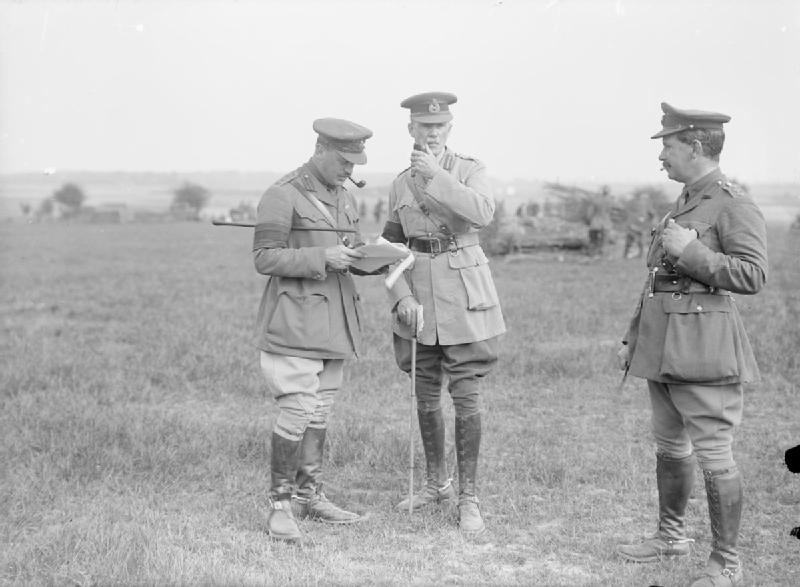
Group portrait including Reed (centre)

He served with the British Army throughout the First World War, becoming a substantive lieutenant colonel in October 1914 and GSO1 of the newly created 27th Division in November. In June 1915 he was promoted to temporary brigadier general and became brigadier general, general staff (BGGS) of IX Corps, which he served with in the Gallipoli campaign. He later received the brevet rank of colonel in March 1916 for his role in the evacuation of Allied forces at Gallipoli from December 1915 to January 1916. In April he was promoted again to temporary brigadier general and became brigadier general, Royal Artillery of the 40th Division, a command he held until January 1917. In October he became a temporary major general and became general officer commanding (GOC) 15th (Scottish) Division from 1917 to 1919.

He then received a permanent promotion to major general in June 1919 and succeeded Major General Sir Philip Robertson as GOC 52nd (Lowland) Infantry Division in June 1923, a post he held until he retired from the army in June 1928.

He died at the age of 61 in London on 7 March 1931.

== Family ==
His son Andrew was killed in 1940 during the Battle of France whilst serving with the RAF.

== The medal ==
His medals are part of the Lord Ashcroft collection and are held by the Imperial War Museum, London.

Military offices
Preceded by Sir Philip Robertson	GOC 52nd (Lowland) Infantry Division; 1923–1927	Succeeded by Sir Henry Thuillier
