= Brian Flaherty =

Irish hurler

Personal information
- Native name: Brian Ó Flaharta (Irish)
- Born: 3 March 1991 (age 35) Galway, Ireland

Sport
- Sport: Hurling
- Position: Right half back
Club
- Years: Club
- Abbeyknockmoy
Club titles
- Galway titles: 0
Inter-county*
Years	County	Apps (scores)
2012-	Galway	1 (0-00)
Inter-county titles
- Leinster titles: 1
- All-Irelands: 0
- NHL: 0
- All Stars: 0
- *Inter County team apps and scores correct as of 19:40, 12 September 2012.

Brian Flaherty (born 3 March 1991) is an Irish hurler who currently plays as a substitute right wing-back for the Galway senior team.

Flaherty joined the team during the 2012 championship, but has remained on the fringe of the panel. An All-Ireland medalist in the minor grade, Flannery has won one Leinster medal in the senior grade as a non-playing substitute.

At club level Flaherty plays with the Abbeyknockmoy club.
