= Jane Jowitt =

Anglo-Irish writer

- Born: Jane Crawford; 14 May 1770; Dublin, Ireland
- Died: 3 August 1846 (aged 76); Union Workhouse, Sheffield, South Yorkshire, England
- Other name: Jane Glover
- Occupations: poet and memoirist
- Notable work: On the Approaching Marriage of Queen Victoria (1840); Memoirs of Jane Jowitt, the Poor Poetess, Aged 74 Years, Written by Herself (1844)

Jane Jowitt (née Crawford, formerly Glover, 14 May 1770 – 3 August 1846) was an Anglo-Irish poet and memoirist, who referred to herself late in life as the "Poor Poetess of Sheffield."

== Early life ==
Jowitt was born as Jane Crawford on 4 May 1770 in Harcourt Street, Dublin. She was from a wealthy family and was educated at Mrs Frances Knowles's school in York Street. Her mother was the daughter of a surgeon from Derbyshire, and died when Jowitt was eight years old.

Later in Jowitt's childhood, her father, an Irish barrister, suffered imprisonment for debt in the Marshalsea in Southwark, London. She was sent to a boarding school at Clontary, paid for by her grandmother.

== Move to England ==
Jowitt moved to England following the Irish Rebellion of 1798. Due to her Irish ancestry, Jowitt was denied work as a servant upon her arrival in Liverpool. She explained in her Memoirs (1844) how she travelled by foot from Liverpool to London in easy stages. She was advised to buy light goods which she could sell while travelling.

== Career and marriages ==
Jowitt spent time in a number of English cities following her journey to London. She worked as hawker of silk handkerchiefs and muslins in Knightsbridge, then moved to Dover.

On 17 December 1810, at St James's Church in Dover, Jowitt married Roman Catholic Irishman Michael Glover (1758–1820/21). He served in the Corps of Royal Sappers and Miners, now known as the Royal Engineers, and worked on constructing fortifications at Dover. When Glover was posted to the British Overseas Territory of Bermuda, Jowitt accompanied him and achieved an income herself by taking in needlework for the female members of Officers' families. They lived in Bermuda for two years. After returning to England in 1817, Jowitt and her husband settled in Sheffield, South Yorkshire. Glover died in 1820 or 1821. Se later wrote about the success and happiness of the marriage, saying that "he behaved towards me in the kindest and most affectionate manner, was sober, strictly honest and respectable."

As a widow in Sheffield, Jowitt worked odd jobs and remarried to a silver-plate manufacturer, whose surname was Jowitt. Six months later, her second husband lost his job and began to drink. He sold his wife's furniture, drank the proceeds from the sale and died. Widowed for a second time and now destitute, Jowitt relied on writing poetry for an income.

Jowitt began to gained some notice as a poet and also became a writer of memorials for local eminences. Her best-known poem at the time was written in memory of the wife of "Earl Fitzwilliam", presumably either Charlotte Ponsonby or Louisa Molesworth, the wives of politician William Fitzwilliam, 4th Earl Fitzwilliam (1748–1833). In 1840, she wrote "On the Approaching Marriage of Queen Victoria", in which she reflected on the experiences of her own two marriages and shared her hopes for the young monarch and her match with Prince Albert of Saxe-Coburg and Gotha.

== Later life and death ==
When she published her memoirs in 1844, Jowitt was "poverty-stricken" and appealed to a middle class readership for financial support in her old age. This has been interpreted as a depiction of herself as a member of the deserving poor who had suffered from misfortunes beyond her control but had strived for financial independence. She died two years later on 3 August 1846 in the Sheffield Union Workhouse, after suffering a paralytic stroke.

== Works ==
- "Lines on the Death of the Rev. T. Cotterill" (1823)
- "On the Approaching Marriage of Queen Victoria" (1840)
- Jowitt, Jane (1844). Memoirs of Jane Jowitt, the Poor Poetess, Aged 74 Years, Written by Herself. Sheffield: J. Pearce. OCLC 10120937.

== Sources ==
- Harte, Liam, ed. (2009), "Jane Jowitt, Memoirs of Jane Jowitt, the Poor Poetess, Aged 74 Years, Written by Herself", The Literature of the Irish in Britain, London: Palgrave Macmillan, pp. 29–32, doi:10.1057/9780230234017_7, ISBN 978-1-349-52602-4
