= Christy Canavan =

Irish footballer

Christy Canavan (born 24 January 1947) is an Irish former footballer who played as a defender.

== Career ==
Canavan was born in Dublin. He joined Shamrock Rovers in 1966 making his debut on 20 April that year, and played in the European Cup Winners' Cup win over Schalke 04 in 1969.

In July 1971 Canavan, along with Billy Dixon was placed on the transfer list by manager Billy Young.

He signed for Dundalk in August 1972.

== Sources ==
- The Hoops by Paul Doolan and Robert Goggins (ISBN 0-7171-2121-6)
