= Pat O'Toole (footballer) =

Irish footballer

Personal information
- Full name: Christopher Patrick O'Toole
- Date of birth: 2 January 1965 (age 61)
- Place of birth: Dublin, Ireland
- Position: Midfielder

Youth career
- Cherry Orchard

Senior career*
Years	Team	Apps	(Gls)
1983–1985	Shamrock Rovers	6	(0)
1985–1986	Drogheda United	?	(?)
1986–1988	Galway United	26	(0)
1988–1990	Shelbourne	?	(?)
1989–1990	Leicester City	0	(0)
1990–1991	→ Exeter City (loan)	6	(0)
1991–1993	Shrewsbury Town	46	(1)
1993–1994	Torquay United	3	(0)
1993–1994	Cobh Ramblers	5	(0)
1993–1994	Shamrock Rovers	2	(0)
1993–1994	Halifax Town	7	(0)
1994–1996	Stafford Rangers	32	(2)
1996–1997	Welshpool Town	17	(1)
1997–1998	Bray Wanderers	1	(0)
1998–1999	Crusaders	?	(3)
1999–2001	Newry Town	?	(?)
- * Club domestic league appearances and goals

Christopher Patrick O'Toole (born 2 January 1965) is an Irish former professional footballer.

== Career ==
O'Toole started his career at Shamrock Rovers in 1983. However, his first team opportunities were limited and after 16 total appearances in 2 years at Glenmalure Park he signed for Drogheda United in 1985. Following two seasons at Galway United he signed for Shelbourne in 1988.

He transferred to Leicester City in February 1990. Unable to break into the Leicester first team, he was loaned to Exeter City in December 1990, playing six times. In March 1991 he joined Shrewsbury Town where he played 46 league games (almost half as substitute) before being released at the end of the 1992-93 season.

In August 1993 he joined Torquay United, making his debut in midfield as Torquay lost on penalties in the League Cup to Hereford United, with his league debut at right-back in place of Lee Barrow in the 2-1 win away to Darlington on 28 August. He switched to left-back, in place of Scott Colcombe, with Barrow restored at right-back, for the next game, a 1-1 draw at home to Carlisle United and played in the following game, a 3-3 draw at home to Colchester United in which Adrian Foster scored a hat-trick. However, these were his only games for Torquay and he left, joining Bridgnorth Town.

In December 1993 he played 5 league games for Cobh Ramblers and in January 1994 he moved back to his first club. In his two stints at the Hoops O'Toole was unfortunate in that the team were winning the league on those occasions so first-team opportunities were limited.

He joined Halifax Town in April 1994, playing seven times in the Conference before being released at the end of the season.

He spent the 1994–95 and 1995-96 seasons with Stafford Rangers. He made one appearance for Bray Wanderers in the 1997-98 League of Ireland season, before moving north to Crusaders in Northern Ireland for one season. He then spent two years with Newry Town.

== Sources ==
- Paul Doolan; Robert Goggins. The Hoops. ISBN 0-7171-2121-6.
- Robert Goggins. The Four-in-a-Row Story.
