= Harry Lyster =

Irish Bengal Army soldier, recipient of the Victoria Cross (1830–1922)

- Born: 24 December 1830; Blackrock, Dublin, Ireland
- Died: 1 February 1922 (aged 91); London, England
- Burial place: St James the Less Churchyard, Stubbing
- Relatives: Hamilton Lyster Reed VC (nephew)
- Military career
- Allegiance: United Kingdom
- Branch: Bengal Army; British Indian Army
- Conflicts: Indian Mutiny; Second Anglo-Afghan War: Battle of Ahmed Khel
- Awards: Victoria Cross; Companion of the Order of the Bath; Mentioned in Despatches five times

Lieutenant General Harry Hammon Lyster VC, CB (24 December 1830 – 1 February 1922) was a recipient of the Victoria Cross, the highest and most prestigious award for gallantry in the face of the enemy that can be awarded to British and Commonwealth forces.

== Early life ==
He was the son of Anthony Lyster (1797–1880) of Stillorgan Park, County Dublin, and his wife Marcia Deborah Tate (1806–1893), born at Grange, County Roscommon. Marcia was the sixth daughter of James Tate of Ballintaggart House, Colbinstown, County Kildare, and his wife Maria Stratford, daughter of John Stratford, 3rd Earl of Aldborough.

In 1847–8 Lyster served as a special constable in London during the Chartist riots. He took a commission in the British East India Company's army on 20 September 1848.

== Details ==
Lyster was 27 years old and a lieutenant in the 72nd Bengal Native Infantry, Bengal Army, during the Indian Mutiny when the following deed took place, for which he was awarded the VC. The citation read:

War Office, 21st October, 1859.

THE Queen has been graciously pleased to signify Her intention to confer the decoration of the Victoria Cross on the undermentioned Officers and Private Soldier of Her Majesty's Indian Military Forces, whose claims to the same have been submitted for Her Majesty's approval, on account of Acts of Bravery performed by them in India, as recorded against their several names; viz. :

[...]

72nd Bengal Native Infantry, Lieutenant Harry Hammon Lyster

Date of Act of Bravery, 23rd May, 1858

For gallantly charging and breaking, singly, a skirmishing square of the retreating Rebel Army from Calpee, and killing two or three Sepoys, in the conflict.

Major-General Sir Hugh Henry Rose, G.C.B., reports that this Act of Bravery was witnessed by himself and by Lieutenant Colonel Gall, C.B., of the 14th Light Dragoons.

Other despatches from Hugh Henry Rose describes how on 31 January 1858 at Baroda, when Lyster had been acting as Rose's interpreter, Lyster was wounded when fighting a nephew of Fazil Muhammad Khan, receiving a "deep sword cut on [the] inner part of [his] right forearm." He killed Khan's nephew during the fight.

== Later life ==
Lyster was promoted major on 19 January 1864, brevet lieutenant colonel on 26 March 1870, and brevet colonel on 25 November 1877. He was Mentioned in Despatches while in command of 3rd Goorkha Regiment at the Battle of Ahmed Khel during the Second Anglo-Afghan War, and appointed Companion of the Order of the Bath on 22 February 1881. He was promoted lieutenant general on 1 September 1891, and retired from the army on 1 July 1892. He died in London on 1 February 1922.

Lyster's VC was on display in the Lord Ashcroft Gallery at the Imperial War Museum, London. As of 2026, the Ashcroft collection is in transition, in a move to the National Army Museum.

== In literature ==
Harry Hammon Lyster is mentioned disparagingly by Flashman in Flashman in the Great Game by George MacDonald Fraser.

== Family ==
Lyster married twice: to Caroline Matilda Davis in 1865; and, following her death in 1895, to Ada Emily Cole in 1901.
