= Brigitte Le Juez =

Brigitte Le Juez (5 October, 1959 - 30 March, 2025) was an author and academic at Dublin City University. She was President of the Comparative Literature Association of Ireland, General Coordinator of the European Network for Comparative Literature, now the European Society of Comparative Literature, and Managing Editor of the Society's journal, CompLit. Journal of European Literature, Arts and Society.

== Published works ==
- Beckett avant la lettre, Grasset, 2007.
- Clerges et cultures populaires, Publications de l'Universite de Saint-Etienne, 2004.
- Le Papegai et le papelard dans "Un Cœur simple" de Gustave Flaubert, Rodopi, 1999.
- Modern French Short Fiction, Manchester University Press, 1994.
- Irlande, Larousse, 1989.
