= Donal O'Mathuna =

Donal O'Mathuna BSc, MA, PhD
- Education: BSc (Pharmacy), Trinity College Dublin, 1982 PhD (Natural Products Chemistry), Ohio State University, 1988 MA (Bioethics & Medical Ethics), Ashland University, 1994
- Occupations: Professor; Pharmacist
- Employer: Ohio State University
- Known for: Disasters, pandemics and humanitarian crises, specifically ethical issues in disaster research
- Board member of: Cochrane Affiliate at the Helene Fuld Institute for EBP

Donal O'Mathuna is a professor within the College of Nursing at The Ohio State University.

He is formerly a Senior Lecturer in Ethics, Decision-Making & Evidence in the School of Nursing & Human Sciences at Dublin City University, Ireland, and Chair of the Academy of Fellows at the Center for Bioethics and Human Dignity in Chicago. His research interests include theology, alternative medicine and disaster ethics. He has written or edited several books, including Nanoethics: Big Ethical Issues with Small Technology (2009).

== Biography ==
O'Mathuna grew up in Ireland and graduated from an undergraduate pharmacy program at Trinity College, Dublin. He then earned a PhD in medicinal chemistry at Ohio State University, and then a MA in theology with an ethics focus from Ashland Theological Seminary. He taught chemistry and theology at Mount Carmel College of Nursing in Columbus. Returning to Ireland in 2003, he teaches ethics, decision-making and evidence at Dublin City University in the School of Nursing and Human Sciences.

With family physician Walt Larimore, O'Mathuna wrote the 2001 book Alternative Medicine: The Christian Handbook. It was described by Publishers Weekly as a book targeted toward Christians who do not have significant experience with alternative therapies. In a review for the Christian Medical Fellowship, physician George Smith called the book "an honest attempt to evaluate alternative medicine, bringing together both faith and science."

O'Mathuna co-edited Commitment and Responsibility in Nursing: A Faith-Based Approach (2004). It was reviewed by Ethics & Medicine and by Nursing Ethics.

In 2009, O'Mathuna wrote Nanoethics: Big Ethical Issues with Small Technology. It was reviewed in Notre Dame Philosophical Reviews " and Times Higher Education. According to WorldCat, the book is held in 1221 libraries.

Dr. O'Mathuna co-edited Disaster Bioethics: Normative Issues When Nothing is Normal (2014). A report by the Enhancing Learning and Research for Humanitarian Assistance (ELRHA): R2HC Programme identified the book as a new resource in disaster ethics.

== Citizens' Assembly ==
In 2017, he presented to the Citizens' Assembly which as of April 2017 is current discussing Ireland's abortion laws, from an anti-abortion ethical perspective.

== Books ==
Books by Donal O'Mathuna include:

- Nanoethics: big ethical issues with small technology, Continuum, 2009.
- (with Walt Larimore), Alternative medicine: the Christian handbook, 2001; updated and expanded edition, Zondervan, 2007.
  - Croatian translation, 2010.
  - Hungarian translation, 2009.
  - Spanish translation of 2001 edition.
- Basic questions on healthcare: what should good care include? (BioBasics Series), Kregel, 2004.
- Commitment and responsibility in nursing: a faith-based approach, Dordt College Press, 2003.
- Basic questions on alternative medicine: what is good and what is not? (BioBasics Series), Kregel, 1998.
- Basic questions on suicide and euthanasia: are they ever right? (BioBasics Series), Kregel, 1998.
- Basic questions on end-of-life decisions: how do we know what's right? (BioBasics Series), Kregel, 1998.
- Basic questions on reproductive technology: when is it right to intervene? (BioBasics Series), Kregel, 1998.

== Publications ==
Publications by Donal O'Mathuna include:

- O'Mathúna, Dónal; Smith, Julia; Zadvinskis, Inga M; Monturo, Cheryl; Kelley, Marjorie M; Tucker, Sharon; Miller, Pamela S; Norful, Allison A; Zellefrow, Cindy; Chipps, Esther (September 2023). "Ethics and frontline nursing during COVID-19: A qualitative analysis". Nursing Ethics. 30 (6): 803–821. doi:10.1177/09697330221143150. PMC 10051012. PMID 36971185.
- Norful, Allison A.; Tucker, Sharon; Miller, Pamela S.; Roberts, Haley; Kelley, Marjorie M.; Monturo, Cheryl; O'Mathúna, Dónal; Smith, Julia; Zadvinskis, Inga M.; Zellefrow, Cindy; Chipps, Esther (January 2023). "Nursing perspectives about the critical gaps in public health emergency response during the COVID -19 pandemic". Journal of Nursing Scholarship. 55 (1): 22–28. doi:10.1111/jnu.12795. PMC 9349459. PMID 35727078.
- O'Mathúna, D.; Upadhaya, N. (1 June 2022). "Should Children Be Enrolled in Clinical Research in Conflict Zones?". AMA Journal of Ethics. 24 (6): E463–471. doi:10.1001/amajethics.2022.463. PMID 35713913. S2CID 249747919.
- O'Mathúna, Dónal P. (1 March 2022). "Ivermectin and the Integrity of Healthcare Evidence During COVID-19". Frontiers in Public Health. 10 788972. Bibcode:2022FrPH...1088972O. doi:10.3389/fpubh.2022.788972. PMC 8921859. PMID 35299698.
- Cleary-Holdforth, Joanne; O'Mathúna, Dónal; Fineout-Overholt, Ellen (December 2021). "Evidence-Based Practice Beliefs, Implementation, and Organizational Culture and Readiness for EBP Among Nurses, Midwives, Educators, and Students in the Republic of Ireland". Worldviews on Evidence-Based Nursing. 18 (6): 379–388. doi:10.1111/wvn.12543. PMID 34750977. S2CID 243861829.
- Kelley, Marjorie M.; Zadvinskis, Inga M.; Miller, Pamela S.; Monturo, Cheryl; Norful, Allison A.; O'Mathúna, Dónal; Roberts, Haley; Smith, Julia; Tucker, Sharon; Zellefrow, Cindy; Chipps, Esther (August 2022). "United States nurses' experiences during the COVID-19 pandemic: A grounded theory". Journal of Clinical Nursing. 31 (15–16): 2167–2180. doi:10.1111/jocn.16032. PMID 34606133. S2CID 238256345.
- Borges do Nascimento, Israel Júnior; O'Mathúna, Dónal P.; von Groote, Thilo Caspar; Abdulazeem, Hebatullah Mohamed; Weerasekara, Ishanka; Marusic, Ana; Puljak, Livia; Civile, Vinicius Tassoni; Zakarija-Grkovic, Irena; Pericic, Tina Poklepovic; Atallah, Alvaro Nagib; Filoso, Santino; Bragazzi, Nicola Luigi; Marcolino, Milena Soriano (December 2021). "Coronavirus disease (COVID-19) pandemic: an overview of systematic reviews". BMC Infectious Diseases. 21 (1): 525. doi:10.1186/s12879-021-06214-4. PMC 8177249. PMID 34088271.
- Yimer, Getnet; Gebreyes, Wondwossen; Havelaar, Arie; Yousuf, Jemal; McKune, Sarah; Mohammed, Abdulmuen; O'Mathúna, Dónal (December 2020). "Community engagement and building trust to resolve ethical challenges during humanitarian crises: experience from the CAGED study". Conflict and Health. 14 (1): 68. doi:10.1186/s13031-020-00313-w. PMC 7539377. PMID 33042218.
- Borges do Nascimento, Israel Júnior; von Groote, Thilo Caspar; O'Mathúna, Dónal P.; Abdulazeem, Hebatullah Mohamed; Henderson, Catherine; Jayarajah, Umesh; Weerasekara, Ishanka; Poklepovic Pericic, Tina; Klapproth, Henning Edgar Gerald; Puljak, Livia; Cacic, Nensi; Zakarija-Grkovic, Irena; Guimarães, Silvana Mangeon Meirelles; Atallah, Alvaro Nagib; Bragazzi, Nicola Luigi; Marcolino, Milena Soriano; Marusic, Ana; Jeroncic, Ana (17 September 2020). "Clinical, laboratory and radiological characteristics and outcomes of novel coronavirus (SARS-CoV-2) infection in humans: A systematic review and series of meta-analyses". PLOS ONE. 15 (9) e0239235. Bibcode:2020PLoSO..1539235B. doi:10.1371/journal.pone.0239235. PMC 7498028. PMID 32941548.
- Romney, Douglas; Fox, Hannah; Carlson, Stephanie; Bachmann, Daniel; O'Mathuna, Donal; Kman, Nicholas (October 2020). "Allocation of Scarce Resources in a Pandemic: A Systematic Review of US State Crisis Standards of Care Documents". Disaster Medicine and Public Health Preparedness. 14 (5): 677–683. doi:10.1017/dmp.2020.101. PMC 7198465. PMID 32295662. S2CID 215794022.
- Borges do Nascimento, Israel Júnior; Cacic, Nensi; Abdulazeem, Hebatullah Mohamed; von Groote, Thilo Caspar; Jayarajah, Umesh; Weerasekara, Ishanka; Esfahani, Meisam Abdar; Civile, Vinicius Tassoni; Marusic, Ana; Jeroncic, Ana; Carvas Junior, Nelson; Pericic, Tina Poklepovic; Zakarija-Grkovic, Irena; Meirelles Guimarães, Silvana Mangeon; Luigi Bragazzi, Nicola; Bjorklund, Maria; Sofi-Mahmudi, Ahmad; Altujjar, Mohammad; Tian, Maoyi; Arcani, Diana Maria Cespedes; O'Mathúna, Dónal P.; Marcolino, Milena Soriano (30 March 2020). "Novel Coronavirus Infection (COVID-19) in Humans: A Scoping Review and Meta-Analysis". Journal of Clinical Medicine. 9 (4): 941. doi:10.3390/jcm9040941. PMC 7230636. PMID 32235486.
- O'Mathúna, Dónal P.; Escartín, Carla Parra; Roche, Proinsias; Marlowe, Jay (5 June 2020). "Engaging citizen translators in disasters: Virtue ethics in response to ethical challenges". Translation and Interpreting Studies. 15 (1): 57–79. doi:10.1075/tis.20003.oma. S2CID 213043360.
- O'Mathúna, Dónal P.; Hunt, Matthew R. (7 October 2019). "Ethics and crisis translation: insights from the work of Paul Ricoeur". Disaster Prevention and Management. 29 (2): 175–186. doi:10.1108/DPM-01-2019-0006. S2CID 208836038.
- Dawson, Angus; Lignou, Sapfo; Siriwardhana, Chesmal; O'Mathúna, Dónal P. (December 2019). "Why research ethics should add retrospective review". BMC Medical Ethics. 20 (1): 68. doi:10.1186/s12910-019-0399-1. PMC 6785872. PMID 31597565.
- Mitrović, Veselin L.; O'Mathúna, Dónal P.; Nola, Iskra A. (August 2019). "Ethics and Floods: A Systematic Review". Disaster Medicine and Public Health Preparedness. 13 (4): 817–828. doi:10.1017/dmp.2018.154. PMID 30626460. S2CID 58593730.
- O'Mathúna, Dónal P. (April 2008). "Teaching ethics using popular songs: feeling and thinking". Monash Bioethics Review. 27 (1–2): 42–55. doi:10.1007/bf03351295. PMID 19205315. S2CID 3171743.
- Mezinska, Signe; Kakuk, Péter; Mijaljica, Goran; Waligóra, Marcin; O'Mathúna, Dónal P. (December 2016). "Research in disaster settings: a systematic qualitative review of ethical guidelines". BMC Medical Ethics. 17 (1): 62. doi:10.1186/s12910-016-0148-7. PMC 5073437. PMID 27769232.
- O'Mathúna, Dónal (2016). "Ideal and nonideal moral theory for disaster bioethics". Human Affairs. 26 (1): 8–17. doi:10.1515/humaff-2016-0002. S2CID 151741040.
- Matthews, Anne; Haas, David M; O'Mathúna, Dónal P; Dowswell, Therese (8 September 2015). "Interventions for nausea and vomiting in early pregnancy". Cochrane Database of Systematic Reviews. 2015 (9) CD007575. doi:10.1002/14651858.cd007575.pub4. PMC 7196889. PMID 26348534.
- O'Mathúna, Dónal (February 2015). "Research ethics in the context of humanitarian emergencies". Journal of Evidence-Based Medicine. 8 (1): 31–35. doi:10.1111/jebm.12136. PMID 25594722. S2CID 22272620.
- Hunt, M.; Schwartz, L.; Pringle, J.; Boulanger, R.; Nouvet, E.; O'Mathúna, D.; Participants of the Humanitarian Healthcare Ethics Forum; Participants of the Humanitarian Healthcare Ethics Forum (2014). "A Research Agenda for Humanitarian Health Ethics". PLOS Currents. 6. doi:10.1371/currents.dis.8b3c24217d80f3975618fc9d9228a144. PMC 4191921. PMID 25687273.
- O'Mathuna, D. P. (1 August 2014). "Christian Bioethics and the Bible". Christian Bioethics. 20 (2): 246–259. doi:10.1093/cb/cbu017.
- Greaney, Anna-Marie; O'Mathúna, Dónal P.; Scott, P. Anne (November 2012). "Patient autonomy and choice in healthcare: self-testing devices as a case in point". Medicine, Health Care and Philosophy. 15 (4): 383–395. doi:10.1007/s11019-011-9356-6. PMID 22038653. S2CID 915117.
