= Eugene O'Riordan =

Eugene O'Riordan is an author and professor at the Dublin City University School of Mathematical Sciences, Dublin, Ireland. His areas of research include singularly perturbed differential equations, numerical analysis and Shishkin meshes.

== Published works ==
Books by Eugene O'Riordan include:

- Robust computational techniques for boundary layers, Chapman and Hall/ CRC press, 2000.
- Fitted numerical methods for singular perturbation problems-error estimates in the maximum norm for linear problems in one and two dimensions, World-Scientific, 1996.
