= Paul F. Whelan =

Irish engineer, computer vision

- Awards: Dublin City University Presidents Research Award in 2011

Academic background
- Education: B.Eng., National Institute for Higher Education (Dublin City University); M.Eng, University of Limerick; PhD., Cardiff University
- Website: cipa.dcu.ie

Paul F. Whelan is Professor of Computer Vision at the Centre for Image Processing & Analysis, School of Electronic Engineering, Faculty of Engineering & Computing Dublin City University.

== Education and career ==
Whelan earned his Bachelor of Engineering with First Class Honours from the National Institute for Higher Education before enrolling in the University of Limerick for his Master of Engineering degree. After receiving his PhD in Computing Mathematics/Computer Vision from Cardiff University, Whelan joined the Industrial and Scientific Imaging Ltd to research and develop an industrial vision system.

== Selected publications ==
- Machine Vision Algorithms in Java: Techniques and Implementation, Springer (reprinted Aug. 2001), 2000.
- Intelligent Vision Systems for Industry, Springer-Verlag, 1997.
