= The Irish Socialist =

- Type: Monthly political newspaper
- Publisher: Communist Party of Ireland
- Founded: 1965
- Political alignment: Communist
- Language: English
- Website: http://www.communistpartyofireland.ie/sv/index.html

The Irish Socialist was a monthly newspaper produced by the Communist Party of Ireland, originally published starting in December 1965 by the Irish Workers' Party prior to its merger with the Communist Party of Northern Ireland and relaunch as the Communist Party of Ireland.

Contributors to the newspaper included Sam Nolan, Eoin Ó Murchú, Betty Sinclair, Michael O'Riordan, John McDonnell, James Stewart, Mick O'Reilly, Eugene McCartan and John Montegomery. The party also published the Irish Socialist Review quarterly and the youth movement produced a magazine called Forward. It was published from 37 Pembroke Lane, before being published from New Books, 16A Pearse St, then 14 Parliament Street, Dublin and then Connolly Books, East Essex Street, in Dublin, and printed by Dorset Press.

The Communist Party of Ireland's current official newspaper is the Socialist Voice.
