= Unity (newspaper) =

Northern Irish Communist newspaper

- Type: Weekly political newspaper
- Publisher: Communist Party of Northern Ireland; Communist Party of Ireland (1970–2021); Irish Communist Party (2021–present)
- Political alignment: Communist
- Language: English
- Website: Unity

Unity is a weekly newspaper that was produced by the Communist Party of Ireland (CPI) until 2021. Since then it has been published independently but not by the Communist Party of Ireland. Previously, it was published by the Communist Party of Northern Ireland (CPNI) prior to its merger with the southern party which formed the Communist Party of Ireland. The CPNI also published the newspaper The Red Hand.

Contributors to the paper included many figures in the Irish communist movements including Sam Nolan, Betty Sinclair, and James Stewart who edited the paper. Unity is still produced in Belfast.

The Communist Party of Ireland's official monthly publication is the Socialist Voice.
