= Cork Socialist Party =

Political party based in Cork, Ireland

- Founded: 1946
- Dissolved: c. 1947
- Split from: Irish Labour Party
- Headquarters: Cork, Ireland
- Ideology: Communism
- Political position: Far-left

The Cork Socialist Party was a communist party based in Cork, Republic of Ireland. It was formed by expelled members of the Irish Labour Party who had joined the party as an entryist faction. Although the candidacy of Michael O'Riordan in a 1946 by-election received considerable support, the party never won a parliamentary seat at any level of government.

== History ==
During World War II, a number of Irishmen associated with the Irish Republican Army (IRA) were interned for the duration of the war, in a period known as "the Emergency". After being freed in 1945, two former internees, Michael O'Riordan (a veteran of the Spanish Civil War) and Jim Savage, joined the Irish Labour Party and formed the Cork-based Liam Mellows branch of the party. The pair hoped to create a communist, entryist faction in the Labour Party, as had been suggested by the Communist Party of Ireland, which disbanded in 1941 amidst pressure during the war. However, the Liam Mellows branch was quickly expelled amid an internal purge by the Labour Party, leading O'Riordan, Savage, and another former internee Derry Kelleher to establish the Cork Socialist Party in 1946.

The party received considerable local support in its early history. Before its founding, in 1945, O'Riordan ran for a seat on Cork Corporation, but he was narrowly defeated and eliminated on the last count. At the June 1946 by-election for Cork Borough, O'Riordan received 3,184 votes, or 11% of the total votes cast. Although he did not win the seat, he notably placed higher than Tom Barry, a prominent IRA leader during the Irish War of Independence and Irish Civil War. The party disappeared from written record soon thereafter, and O'Riordan later joined the Irish Workers' Party and eventually became the general secretary of the Communist Party of Ireland when it was reconstituted in 1970. The party caught the attention of Bishop of Cork Daniel Cohalan, who, during Lent in 1947, decried the Cork Socialist Party as having been "a group of communists".
