= Sean Murray (politician) =

Irish communist activist and organiser

Seán Murray

General Secretary of the Communist Party of Ireland
- In office June 1933 – March 1941
- Succeeded by: Tommy Watters

National Organiser of the Communist Party of Northern Ireland
- In office 1950 – 25 May 1961

Personal details
- Born: John Murray; June 15, 1898 Cushendall, County Antrim, Ireland
- Died: May 25, 1961 (aged 62) Royal Victoria Hospital, Belfast
- Resting place: Dundonald Cemetery, Belfast
- Party: Communist Party of Ireland
- Other political affiliations: Sinn Féin; Communist Party of Great Britain; Communist Party of the Soviet Union; Revolutionary Workers' Groups; Communist Party of Northern Ireland

Military service
- Branch/service: Irish Republican Army; Anti-Treaty IRA
- Years of service: 1918 or 1919 to 1922
- Rank: Commandant
- Unit: IRA 2nd Brigade, 3rd Northern Division; Antrim Battalion
- Commands: Company; Antrim Battalion (briefly)
- Battles/wars: Irish War of Independence; Irish Civil War

Seán Murray (15 June 1898 – 25 May 1961) was an Irish communist political activist, organiser, editor and writer. Born the son of a small farmer in Cushendall, County Antrim, he joined the IRA during the Irish War of Independence and took the anti-Treaty side in the Irish Civil War following the Anglo-Irish Treaty of 1921. After emigrating to Scotland and then London, he joined the Communist Party of Great Britain (CPGB) and was selected to attend the International Lenin School in Moscow.

On returning to Ireland in 1930, Murray became the leading figure in the Revolutionary Workers' Groups and, from 1933, general secretary of the Communist Party of Ireland (CPI), a post he held until March 1941. In the 1930s, he edited the communist movement's newspapers, took part in the Republican Congress in 1934, toured the United States in the same year, attended the seventh congress of the Comintern in 1935, and helped to organise Irish volunteers for the International Brigades in the Spanish Civil War. After the CPI dissolved itself in 1941, he moved to Belfast, where he worked with the Communist Party of Northern Ireland (CPNI) and later served as its national organiser. He drafted its 1958 programme, The Irish Way to Socialism, and died in Belfast in 1961.

Historians and reviewers have differed in their assessment of Murray. Stephen Bowler described him as a Stalinist who was nonetheless capable of flexibility in Irish conditions, while his biographer, Seán Byers, argued that his republicanism and his loyalty to Moscow were in continual tension.

== Early life ==
Murray was born on 15 June 1898 in Cushendall, in the Glens of Antrim, one of four children of Patrick Murray, a small farmer, and his wife Mary Ann (née Gore). (Note: Stephen Bowler gives his birthplace as the townland of Ballybrack and Emmet O'Connor as Laney, while the Dictionary of Irish Biography states that it was one or the other.) He was christened John on 18 June 1898 at St Mary's Catholic Church in Cushendall, became known as Seán, and was raised as a Roman Catholic. In a short autobiography written for the Comintern on 11 August 1932, he described his parents as living a "poor peasant" life. Byers states that his father inherited the family farm at Ballybrack, and that the census returns of 1901 and 1911 show it to have been a modest holding.

According to Byers, census records indicate that Murray spent much of his childhood with his mother and sisters, Mary, Kate and Margaret, on the farm of his maternal uncle, James, at Laney. He attended Glenaan National School, where his teacher, Master McNamee, took an interest in his education. He left school at a young age and worked on his father's and uncle's farms. (Note: Sources differ on whether he left school at the age of eleven or fourteen, with Byers favouring eleven.) He later attended evening classes during the winter months and studied Irish history, and he attributed his initial interest in socialism to reading the works of James Connolly. He claimed descent from republican activists, including a great-grandfather who was a United Irishman and ancestors who took part in the rebellions of 1848 and 1867.

== Irish republican activity (1917 to 1922) ==
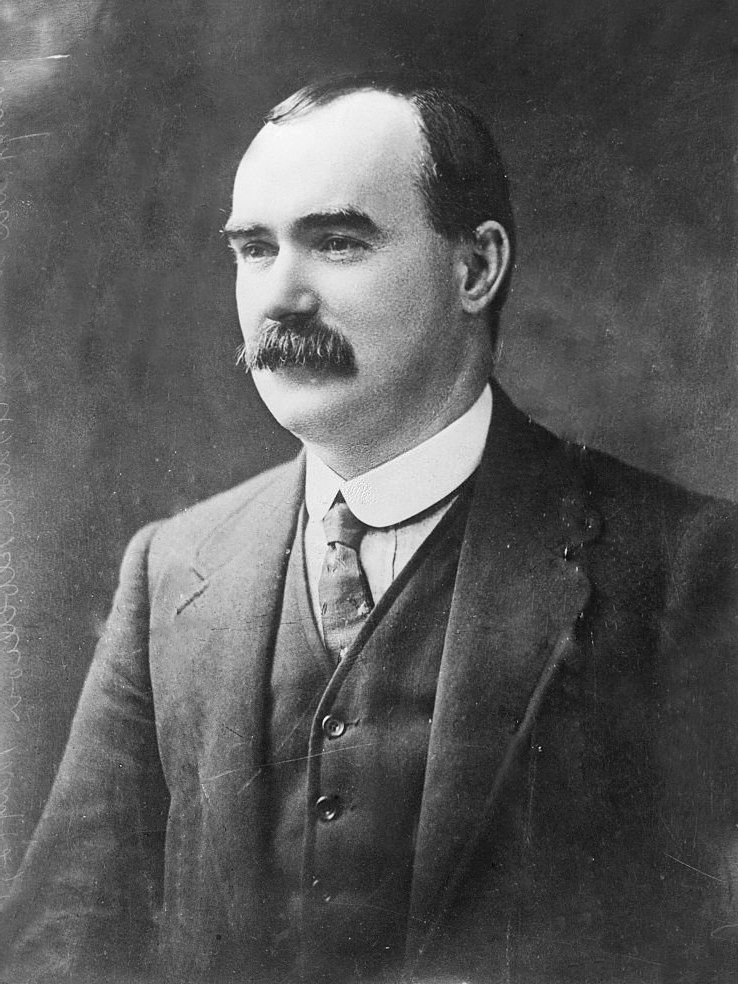
Early influences on Murray included Roger Casement, James Connolly, and Captain Jack White

Byers states that a chance encounter with Roger Casement stimulated Murray's interest in Irish independence. Martin Flynn, reviewing Byers's biography, noted that Casement was a sponsor of the Glens Irish festival. Murray did not take part in the Easter Rising of 1916, but he later described the execution of Connolly as "among the blackest crimes of imperialism against the Irish nation and against the international Labour movement". He joined Sinn Féin in 1917 and became secretary of his local cumann. He enlisted in the IRA's 2nd Brigade, 3rd Northern Division, in 1918 or 1919. (Note: Byers dates his enlistment to September 1918, whereas Bowler and the Dictionary of Irish Biography give April 1919.) Bowler states that he was inspired to join by Captain Jack White.

Murray became a commandant in the IRA. (Note: Byers describes Murray as having become commandant of his company shortly after enlisting, while the Dictionary of Irish Biography describes him as briefly commandant of the Antrim battalion.) In an article for The Irish News, Byers wrote that Murray's unit carried out attacks on Crown forces and unionist figures, a bank robbery, and the burning of the home of the unionist politician Ronald McNeill.

Murray was arrested and interned without trial in 1920 or 1921, and was held at Crumlin Road Gaol in Belfast and then at the Curragh Camp. (Note: The Dictionary of Irish Biography and Bowler place his arrest in 1920, while Byers states that he was arrested in July 1921 on his way to join a flying column, and that the signing of the Anglo-Irish Treaty on 6 December secured his release. Byers also gives the length of his internment as approximately eight months, which does not fit those dates.) He was released in 1921.

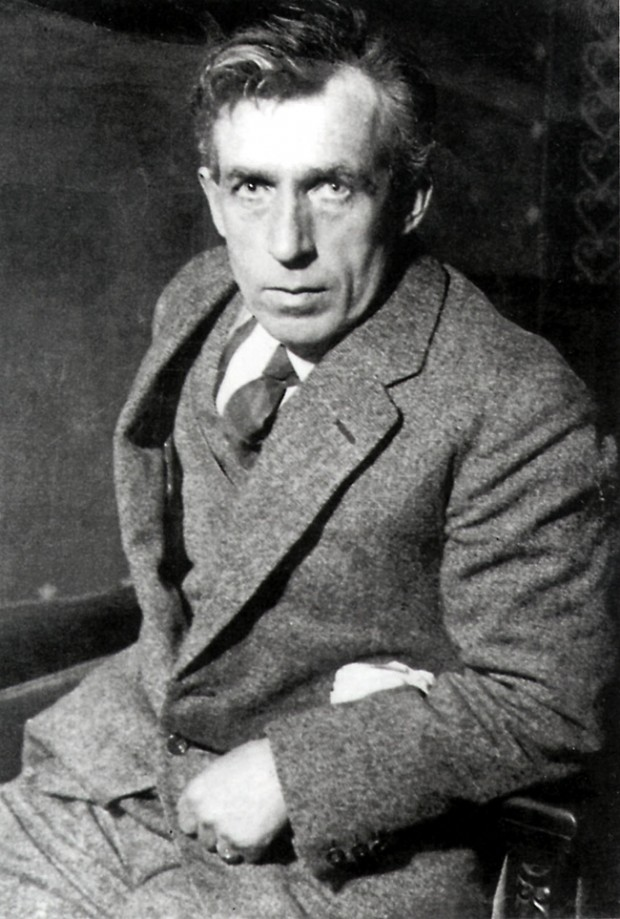
Following their first meeting in 1922, Murray became lifelong friends with Peadar O'Donnell.

Murray opposed the Anglo-Irish Treaty. In March 1922 he was one of 211 delegates to the banned IRA convention at the Mansion House in Dublin, which reaffirmed their opposition to the Treaty and to the Provisional Government. Byers states that the convention was chaired by Liam Mellows. Murray first met Peadar O'Donnell there, and O'Donnell became his closest friend. In the subsequent Irish Civil War, during the IRA's unsuccessful northern offensive of May 1922, Murray led his unit in an attack on Cushendall police barracks. According to Byers, the offensive was planned for the five Northern Divisions, with the capture of Musgrave Street Barracks in Belfast on 19 May intended to provide the impetus for similar attacks across Ulster. The Belfast attack failed, and the Cushendall operations, which included a bank raid, formed part of twenty-six incidents in the area over six days. Fearing harassment by the B Specials and the RUC, Murray emigrated to Glasgow in December 1922 and found work as a labourer on the Clyde.

== Communist activism in Britain and Moscow (1922 to 1930) ==
=== Britain ===
In Glasgow, during the period of Red Clydeside, Murray was introduced to communist activity. In 1924 he moved to London, where he worked as a labourer and joined the Communist Party of Great Britain. On the recommendation of Jack White, he became district secretary of Jim Larkin's Irish Worker League in London, and by 1925 he was an organiser for the CPGB's Islington branch and a member of its London District Committee.

Murray took part in the general strike of 1926, during which police raided his lodgings, and his trade union, the National Union of Distributive and Allied Workers, nominated him as a delegate to Tower Hamlets Trades Council. He was employed by the All Russian Co-operative Society (ARCOS) until its London offices were closed after a raid in May 1927, and afterwards by Russian Oil Products.

=== International Lenin School ===
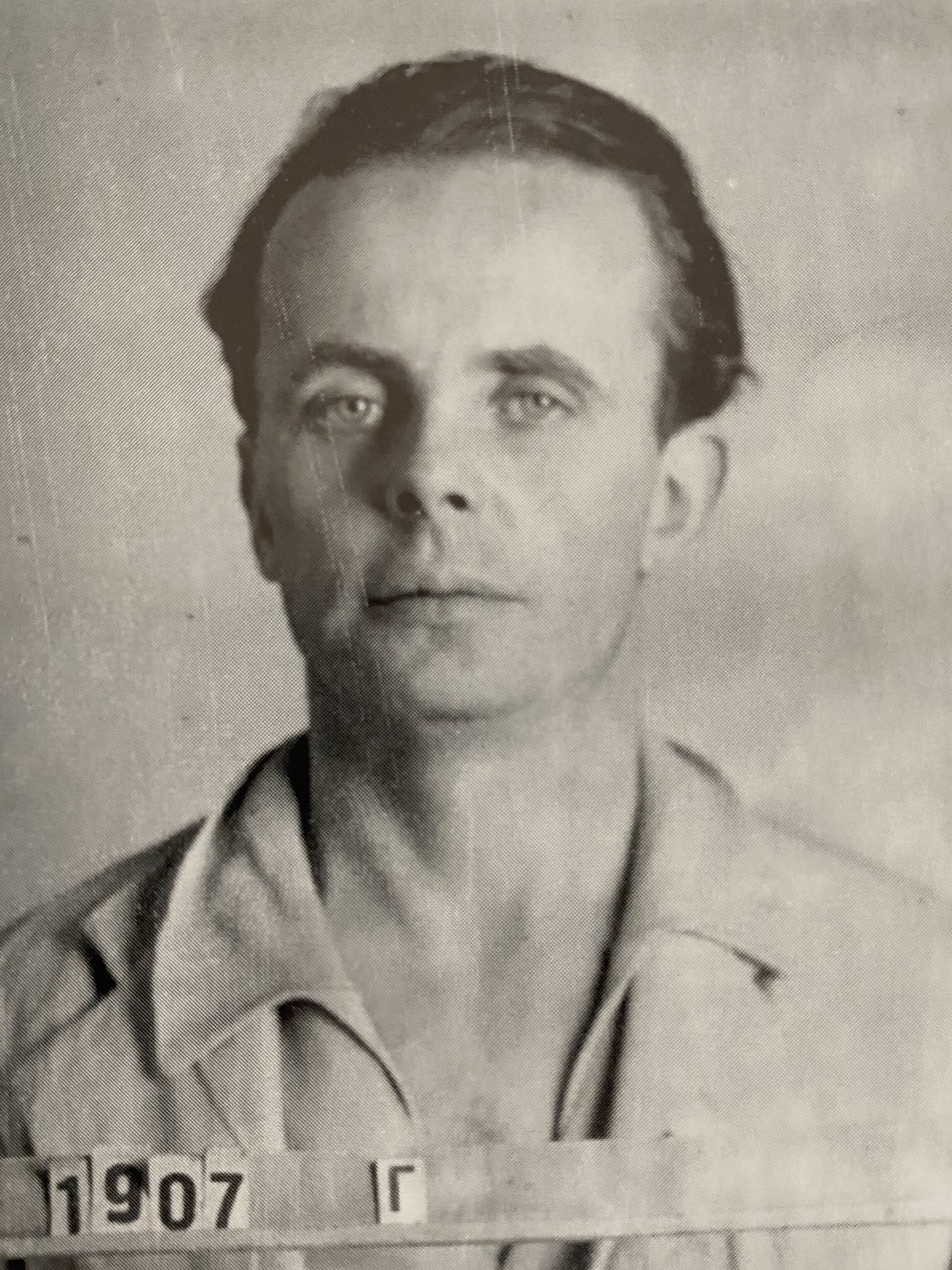
Murray attended the International Lenin School alongside fellow Irishmen James Larkin Jnr and Padraic Breslin

Murray attended the International Lenin School with Padraic Breslin and James Larkin Jnr. Using the pseudonym James Black, he joined the first Irish intake in Moscow on 11 December 1927, having attended the CPGB national congress in Salford in October. Byers notes that Murray was unusual in attending not on the instructions of the Dublin leadership but as one of ten CPGB delegates to the school. Historian Barry McLoughlin has written that the Comintern intended the Irish enrolment to train a second generation of leaders who would follow the Moscow line.

Murray was admitted to the Communist Party of the Soviet Union on 20 February 1928. His tutors described him as very capable and active and credited him with a strong grasp of Marxist-Leninist methods. In the summer of 1929, Murray and Larkin joined other students on a study trip to Dagestan, which McLoughlin records as shocking them because of the treatment of women there. By October 1929 the Comintern had placed Murray and Larkin in a specialised agrarian group within the Anglo-American Secretariat. (Note: The Anglo-American Secretariat was the body of the Comintern that normally advised it on decisions concerning Ireland.) They co-wrote a pamphlet of about 100 pages on conditions in Ireland, which was translated into Russian and published in Moscow in 1930 with a print run of 7,000 copies. (Note: Byers states that it ran to six chapters, dealt with subjects including partition, the Civil War, women's labour and the rural economy, and looked forward to a "proletarian dictatorship" in Ireland.)

After the expulsion of Nikolai Bukharin from the Comintern, the school carried out a purge in 1930, during which Larkin Jnr was replaced as the Anglo-Irish group's party organiser. The Irish students complained of being excluded from discussions of Irish policy, and Murray supported their complaint. A special commission chaired by the American communist Harry Haywood argued strongly in the students' favour, and a compromise was reached under which they would be consulted on Irish policy in future. (Note: Haywood shared a room with Murray at the school.) Byers states that Murray otherwise kept a low profile and incurred no censure, whereas Larkin Jnr and Charlie Ashmore were censured and Breslin was expelled from the school.

== Revolutionary Workers' Groups (1930 to 1933) ==
=== Establishment of the party ===
Murray arrived in Dublin in July 1930 as a paid organiser on the Comintern's books. (Note: Byers dates Murray's return to Ireland to July 1930, as do O'Connor and Milotte, whereas Bowler and the Dictionary of Irish Biography place it in 1931.) That month, in the Workers' Voice, he wrote that the slogans of "Ireland against England", "Independence" and "Republic" should be replaced by that of class against class. Byers states that the article briefly soured relations with Peadar O'Donnell, who had been the main facilitator of cooperation between communists and republicans. The Comintern had sent Tom Bell to Ireland in September 1929 to prepare a new party, (Note: O'Connor states that the Comintern approved the dispatch of a commission in July 1929 and that Bell reported from Ireland on 26 October 1929, whereas Milotte states that Bell arrived with Bob Stewart "early in 1930".) and in September 1930 it replaced Bell, whom it accused of a sectarian attitude, with a secretariat of Murray, Larkin Jnr and Bill Denn. According to O'Connor, Murray gradually emerged as de facto leader of the Revolutionary Workers' Groups (RWG) from November 1930. In January 1931 a conference of the RWG in Dublin endorsed the Comintern's policy of "class against class". (Note: O'Connor states that the conference of 10 and 11 January endorsed the line "unreservedly", whereas Byers describes the endorsement as conditional, since the leadership remained open to a mass movement uniting "the working class, peasantry and discontented bourgeoisie".)

In early 1931, the RWG's Belfast group complained to the Comintern that decision-making had been concentrated in the hands of three people. The Comintern rejected the complaint in July 1931. Byers states that Harry Pollitt, the CPGB leader, arbitrated, and that Murray met the Belfast members and gave assurances about their input within the framework of democratic centralism. In an article of 5 September 1931, he criticised the sectarian conflict between "the orange and the green" in the North and argued that workers should concentrate on issues common to all. The Dictionary of Irish Biography states that Murray attended the founding congress of Saor Éire in September 1931 and advised on the drafting of its programme, whereas Byers describes his attitude towards it as ambiguous.

On 18 October 1931, a pastoral letter read in every parish condemned the IRA and Saor Éire. The RWG and eleven other organisations were declared illegal that month under the Constitution (Amendment No. 17) Act 1931. (Note: Milotte states that the government's list named the Workers' Revolutionary Party, the earlier name of the RWG, rather than the RWG itself, and that much of the information behind it was out of date.) In an article for the American communist newspaper the Daily Worker of 2 January 1932, Murray wrote that the Free State government had "dropped its constitutional mantle and donned the Steel Jacket of military Dictatorship". He described the Act as abolishing trial by jury for political offences in favour of a military tribunal. Murray attributed the measure to the economic crisis and to the involvement of the Church, criticised the Fianna Fáil leader Éamon de Valera for declaring in favour of an "Irish and Catholic way of solving our difficulties", and stated that the RWG would contest the forthcoming general election. (Note: Murray stated that the tribunal consisted of five army officers, that there was no appeal against its sentences, and that it could impose the death penalty on members of an unlawful association. Among the banned bodies he listed the RWG, the Working Farmers' Committee Movement, the Friends of the Soviet Union and the Irish Labour Defence League.) The RWG resumed legal activity following the change of government in 1932.

=== Leadership of the Revolutionary Workers' Groups ===
Murray edited the movement's weekly paper, the Workers' Voice, and the Dictionary of Irish Biography describes him as supervisory editor of its successive titles between 1932 and 1936. Byers states that he assumed editorial control in late 1931, and that the paper lost three publishers over about twelve months before reappearing on 9 April 1932. Following the election of the Fianna Fáil government, Murray moved the paper towards a more nationalist line, and from 4 June 1932 it directed its criticism at the Cumann na nGaedheal leader William T. Cosgrave rather than at de Valera. In mid-June he travelled to Moscow with Joe Troy and told the Anglo-American Secretariat that the Comintern line had proved unworkable in Ireland and that the communists had been "too sharp" with de Valera. The Comintern conceded that the RWG should work with those in the IRA, Fianna Fáil and the Labour Party who opposed British imperialism, though it criticised the paper's "deliberate avoidance of even the word Communist". On 8 October the paper was renamed the Irish Workers' Voice.

The RWG's membership and the paper's circulation reached their peak in 1932. (Note: The RWG's membership peaked at 340 according to O'Connor's Labour Lives entry, whereas his article in Irish Historical Studies and Byers both give 339 in November 1932. Byers also states that the paper's weekly circulation doubled to 3,000.) In October 1932, the RWG played a leading part in the Outdoor Relief strike in Belfast, which mobilised thousands of Catholic and Protestant workers. (Note: The strike was called by an outdoor relief workers' committee formed by Belfast communists and others, to press for relief rates in line with those in Britain.) Murray later acknowledged that the RWG's weakness in the trade unions, a consequence of its shunning of "reformist" bodies, was instrumental in the movement's decline. Byers states that Murray, who was based in Dublin, played a smaller part than Belfast communists such as Betty Sinclair, but that he addressed a crowd of about 800 in Belfast on 11 September and shared a platform with Sinclair and Jack Beattie after the strike began on 3 October. Murray described the campaign as a "model" for the working class in the six counties.

In January 1933 the RWG's Sphinx Publications issued The Irish Case for Communism, which Murray wrote as a draft programme for a new party. Early in 1933 the CPGB censured the RWG over its election manifesto and the proposed composition of the new party. Murray argued privately that, given the strength of religious opposition, it would be imprudent to give the new organisation a communist title, but Pollitt instructed him to proceed with the formation of a communist party. Byers states that the CPGB leadership had come close to removing him for insubordination.

==== Siege of Connolly House ====
In March 1933 the IRA army convention introduced rules restricting its members' political associations, and Frank Ryan resigned as editor of An Phoblacht in protest while O'Donnell withdrew from the IRA executive. On 27 March 1933, a mob of around 6,000, inspired by a Lenten pastoral read at the Pro-Cathedral, laid siege to Connolly House, the RWG's headquarters on Great Strand Street in Dublin. Murray was among fourteen defenders of the building, which was besieged for three days and nights. When the adjoining building was set alight, he escaped over the rooftops and injured his leg, which Byers identifies as his ankle. According to Byers, a number of IRA men, including Bill Gannon, whose sister Margaret later became Murray's wife, came to the defenders' aid on the orders of George Gilmore.

== General secretary of the Communist Party of Ireland (1933 to 1941) ==
=== Foundation of the party ===
Murray was general secretary of the Communist Party of Ireland (CPI) from 1933 to 1941 and the editor of its newspaper The Irish Workers' Voice.

The CPI held its inaugural congress in early June 1933 without publicity, and elected Murray as secretary and Larkin Jnr as chairman. (Note: The party's own history gives the dates as 3 and 4 June, as does a contemporary report by Aodh Mac Manus, whereas Byers gives 4 and 5 June.) Murray's draft programme, The Irish Case for Communism, was adopted in extended form as the party's manifesto, Ireland's Path to Freedom. Byers states that the congress adopted the manifesto without amendment. It replaced the earlier criticism of Cosgrave with sharper criticism of de Valera, in response to the reprimand from London, dropped the pledge of religious liberty, and appealed directly to northern workers, presenting the Outdoor Relief riots as the basis for conflict with British imperialism. Murray described the party as the United Irishmen of the twentieth century. C. Desmond Greaves, who knew Murray, recalled that the Comintern was consulted over the manifesto and advised an uncompromising national stand, and that when Murray suggested appealing to loyalist traditions in order to reach the Orangemen, a Soviet member replied that "No nation can tolerate a Vendée".

In the municipal elections that month Murray polled 75 first-preference votes, and Larkin Jnr lost his seat. At the annual Wolfe Tone commemoration at Bodenstown on 18 June 1933, IRA members attacked the CPI delegation and seized and destroyed its literature. On 18 July the party decided that its meetings would in future be organised through factory and street cells rather than in public.

In October 1933 Murray was served with an exclusion order from Northern Ireland after attempting to speak at a banned demonstration in Belfast. A week later he defied the order and was jailed for a month. (Note: Byers states that the meeting of 15 October was a banned celebration of the Outdoor Relief strike, that Murray reached the platform at the ILP Hall, and that two detectives then escorted him at gunpoint to the Dublin train. He spoke at another public meeting in Belfast on 22 October, was arrested the following day, and was sentenced to one month's imprisonment in Crumlin Road Gaol.) Byers wrote that the order was issued by the Northern Ireland minister for home affairs, Dawson Bates, and remained in force until 1941.

In November 1933 the Comintern criticised the CPI for doing little to popularise its manifesto, observed that the Workers' Voice appeared "more as a Left republican journal rather than the organ of the CPI", and held Murray largely responsible for the party's condition. At a meeting of the party's leadership on 10 and 11 March 1934, Murray praised those who had taken to the streets against fascism in Austria, Spain and France, and questioned the Communist Party of Germany's strategy towards Hitler, views which found little support among his colleagues. In the spring of 1934 he visited Moscow and the United States, where he lectured under the auspices of the Communist Party and raised funds for the CPI. According to Byers, he addressed the 8th national convention of the Communist Party of the United States in Cleveland, Ohio, visited Irish Workers' Clubs in New York and toured cities of the east and mid-west. The number of branches of the clubs rose from two to sixteen during the visit, and the clubs published his pamphlet Ireland's Fight for Freedom and the Irish in the USA.

=== Republican Congress and popular front ===
Protestant socialists from Belfast, part of the Republican Congress, marched to Bodenstown in June 1934. They were subsequently attacked by other Republicans

After an IRA convention on 17 March 1934 rejected proposals for an anti-imperialist republican congress, O'Donnell, Ryan and Gilmore left the IRA, and a conference at Athlone on 7 and 8 April issued a manifesto known as the "Athlone Call". The CPI, with Murray absent in the United States, welcomed the new movement as a united front but warned against any attempt to form a political party. In June 1934 the IRA attacked the Congress's Belfast contingent, which included Protestants from the Shankill Road, at the Bodenstown commemoration. The contingent's banners, which included one reading "Shankill Road Belfast Branch. Break the Connection with Capitalism", were torn in the fighting that followed. (Note: Byers describes a further clash at Bodenstown in June 1935, in which the IRA tore up the red flag of the Congress and CPI contingent, an incident that he considers shook Murray's faith in the political potential of the republican movement. Milotte likewise records attacks on the Congress contingent at Bodenstown in both 1934 and 1935.)

At a Republican Congress meeting in Rathmines Town Hall on 29 and 30 September 1934, Murray, having returned from his travels, supported a resolution by O'Donnell for a united republican front against a resolution for a new revolutionary party pursuing an immediate workers' republic. The CPI delegation, the largest at the congress, helped to secure the united-front victory, which was carried by 99 votes to 84. Michael Price and Nora Connolly O'Brien, who had backed the "Workers' Republic" resolution, resigned from the Congress immediately, bringing their supporters with them and splitting the organisation, creating a wound it never recovered from. Joe Carroll wrote in The Irish Catholic that the Comintern had urged Murray to prevent the congress from producing a rival party, and later criticised him for mishandling the opportunity.

On 14 October 1934 the Anglo-American Secretariat criticised Murray for placing the CPI in support of what it called revolutionary national republicanism, and for failing to argue for a compromise slogan of a "Workers' and Farmers' Republic". The Comintern repeated the criticism on 16 November. (Note: Emmet O'Connor and Byers have argued that Pollitt failed to pass on the clear terms of a Comintern memorandum of 16 September, although Byers allows that Murray may have received the instructions and chosen to disregard them.) The CPGB sent Pat Devine to Dublin as a full-time instructor. Greaves recalled Murray describing a meeting at which Pollitt reminded him of Comintern policy after he proposed a softer line towards Fianna Fáil.

Murray attended the 7th World Congress of the Comintern in Moscow, which ran from 25 July to 20 August 1935, accompanied by Devine. The congress promulgated the popular front policy, and his speech was published in Communist International on 12 September 1935. In it, he acknowledged that the CPI had initially classified de Valera with the imperialists, and had later erred in the opposite direction. Byers regards the congress's call to avoid direct intervention in the internal affairs of national parties as a victory for national specificity, and states that a CPI conference in October 1935 endorsed the new "people's front" policy. The CPI worked with other groups in the unemployed workers' movement in 1934 and 1935 and in the Dublin tram strike of 1935. The strike lasted from 2 March to 18 May 1935. During it, 43 republicans and socialists were arrested, including O'Donnell, and the CPI's headquarters was raided five times. (Note: Murray reported to the Anglo-American Secretariat in July 1935 that the party's membership stood at 150.) In 1936, for the 20th anniversary of the Easter Rising, Murray wrote the pamphlet The Irish Revolt: 1916 and After. On Easter Monday 1936 a crowd of around 5,000 prevented Willie Gallacher from addressing a CPI rally at College Green in Dublin, and police escorted Murray and Gallacher to a station.

=== Spanish Civil War ===
Murray edited The Worker in 1936 and, with O'Donnell and Bill Gannon, organised Irish enlistment in the International Brigades during the Spanish Civil War. In August 1936, on the day that Eoin O'Duffy announced his intention to raise an Irish brigade to support Franco, Murray appealed for financial assistance for the Spanish government and argued that the war was no more a religious issue than the Irish Land War had been. The first group of 80 volunteers left Ireland on 11 December 1936 under Frank Ryan. Reviewing Byers's biography, John Cunningham described Murray as having acted as a Comintern proxy in selecting and vetting the volunteers. Byers states that Murray and Gannon shouldered much of the work of vetting. Murray declined some applicants on grounds of age or their value to the party, but the screening became less rigorous as the war continued. Greaves credited Murray's "vision" as "largely responsible for the formation of the James Connolly Battalion of the International Brigade". Byers wrote that his contribution to the republican cause had been understated in accounts of Irish participation in the war, and that he co-edited the Irish Democrat with Frank Ryan and Seán Nolan. The paper was launched on 27 March 1937 by a broad coalition that included the CPI, the Republican Congress and the Northern Ireland Socialist Party. Disagreements with the Socialist Party over the paper's republican emphasis and over events in Catalonia weakened the coalition, and by the end of 1937 it survived only nominally. In early February 1937 Murray defended the Moscow trials at a party meeting, describing Trotsky as "a man without principle". According to the Dictionary of Irish Biography, cooperation with O'Donnell and Ryan became strained when Murray followed Moscow in endorsing the Spanish republican government's suppression of anarchists and Trotskyists. Byers notes that Ryan himself described the POUM as a "fascist force in the rear".

=== Decline of the party ===
By 1937 the Comintern was questioning Murray's leadership. After a meeting in Moscow in May with the CPI chairman in Dublin, Frank Mooney, the Comintern representative André Marty accepted reports from Devine and Pollitt that it would be wasteful to invest in the party while Murray remained general secretary, and a commission of inquiry was arranged. Murray did not attend the inquiry in London on 10 June after Pollitt refused to advance £100 for the election deposit of the CPI candidate Bill Scott. The CPI instead supported Frank Ryan, who stood in the general election of July 1937 while in Spain and polled 875 votes, losing his deposit.

By 1938 the CPI's membership had fallen to about 100, and the CPGB, which was asked by Moscow to assist the party, described its condition as "catastrophic" and blamed Murray's leadership. In 1938 senior figures in the CPGB, including Pollitt and apparently Gallacher, called for the CPI to be liquidated, and Murray's appeals secured a reprieve. Between December 1938 and early 1939, J. R. Campbell of the CPGB put forward Billy McCullough as a possible replacement for Murray. Dublin members ratified Murray's proposal that the party give "critical support" to Fianna Fáil by 60 votes to 23, and elected him to a new national committee with Tommy Watters and Nolan. The Comintern nevertheless removed him from its payroll. Greaves recalled asking Murray in July 1939 to state the party's policy towards de Valera's government and receiving the reply "We support it". A CPGB report of March 1939 commended Murray's devotion but concluded that he lacked ability, and he ceased to be a full-time party worker. Brian Kenny wrote in the Dublin Review of Books that Murray was reportedly drinking heavily by 1939. He launched the weekly Irish Workers' Weekly on 29 April 1939.

Following the Molotov–Ribbentrop Pact of August 1939, the CPI briefly resumed class-struggle rhetoric, and in November 1939 it called for the withdrawal of Northern Ireland from the war. Byers notes that the pact came as a shock to the membership, as the party's paper had argued on 5 August that "Nazis Can Never Be Our Allies". The Dictionary of Irish Biography states that between 1938 and 1941 Murray altered his analysis of Britain's role in Ireland with each shift in Soviet foreign policy. In December 1940 Murray applied for a military service pension in respect of his IRA service, which Byers regards as a sign of his diminished financial circumstances. He was awarded £28 17s 9d a year. On 8 March 1941 the party's paper referred to Tommy Watters as general secretary without mentioning Murray, and Byers considers it likely that the change was prompted by the CPGB rather than by the membership.

== Northern Ireland (1941 to 1961) ==
=== Move to Belfast ===
After the German invasion of the Soviet Union in June 1941, the CPI dissolved its Dublin branch into the Irish Labour Party and pursued a pro-war policy in Northern Ireland. Byers states that the Dublin branch voted narrowly on 10 July 1941 to suspend independent activity and to work within the Labour and trade union organisations. Murray's exclusion order was lifted on 8 October 1941, with the assistance of the Independent Labour MP Jack Beattie. He moved to Belfast, where he worked as a labourer and later at Harland and Wolff. Byers states that he returned to the North partly to be closer to his ailing parents, worked briefly as a barman at the Empire Theatre, and built air raid shelters before the party found him a post as an "electrical helper" at Harland and Wolff.

Following the split in 1941 he was involved with the Communist Party of Northern Ireland (CPNI), although the Dictionary of Irish Biography states that he was eased out of authority so that leaders of Protestant background, such as William McCullough and Betty Sinclair, could cultivate pro-war unionist workers. Flynn described his position during this period as marginal, and O'Connor records that some colleagues regarded him as "deadwood" or disapproved of his republicanism or his drinking, while others deplored the neglect of his talents. McCullough became general secretary of the CPNI, which reached the peak of its wartime influence in 1943 with about 1,000 members. Byers found fewer than a dozen contributions by Murray to the party's newspaper Unity between November 1942 and the end of 1945, and concluded that his influence on its editorial line was negligible for most of the war. O'Donnell later said that "in Belfast he was wasted by his own comrades".

=== Return to leadership ===
A purge of the CPNI in 1946 assisted Murray's recovery. Byers states that the party's annual conference elected Murray as chairman in March 1945, a position he kept until the end of the decade. He edited Unity in 1945 and 1946, was Belfast correspondent of the CPGB's Daily Worker, and in September 1946 contributed an article on Ulster unionism, "Robinson Crusoe Politics", to The Bell, which O'Donnell then edited. Murray criticised the Republic of Ireland Act 1948 on the ground that it would leave future Irish governments unable to act on partition and would consolidate Northern Ireland's position within the Union. Byers regards this as a perceptive assessment, in view of the Ireland Act 1949.

The Dictionary of Irish Biography states that Murray served as CPNI chairman and national organiser from 1950 to 1961 and as Belfast correspondent of the Daily Worker, and that he made several visits to eastern bloc countries. Byers dates his appointment as national organiser to a conference held on 1 and 2 July 1950. He founded a weekly paper, the Northern Worker, which ceased publication in November 1950 after seven issues, revived the party's educational lectures and encouraged the formation of its youth wing. A report by the RUC described him as the "brain behind the organisation". A 1980 article in Magill stated that in the South, where "communist hunting and denouncing had become a national pastime", the post-war climate was hostile to communists, whereas in the North the party "had thrived and had not inconsiderable Protestant worker membership".

Murray drafted the CPNI executive's statement on the revelations of Khrushchev's secret speech in 1956, which refused to accept that the "injustices resulting from this departure from Marxism-Leninism" were a reflection of the "attributes of one man" but welcomed the steps taken towards the "elimination of the evils attendant on the Stalin cult". In 1957 he travelled to Moscow for the 40th anniversary of the Bolshevik Revolution, as part of the first Irish delegation to an international communist conference since 1935, and in 1959 he attended the 21st congress of the CPSU. He represented the CPNI and the Irish Workers' League, the party's southern counterpart established in 1948, at the 1960 International Meeting of Communist and Workers Parties. In his address to the conference of 81 parties, he said that imperialism had "not changed its spots" but had suffered "a serious decline in its power". Byers wrote that this final visit to the Soviet Union took place in November and December 1960.

=== The Irish Way to Socialism ===
Murray's last significant contribution was the draft programme The Irish Way to Socialism, which O'Connor dates to 1958. Byers states that he had prepared a full draft by June 1955, on which he consulted William Gallacher and Tommy Watters, and that he later divided the material into two documents, one for the CPNI and one for the Irish Workers' League. The programme was criticised from within and outside the CPNI for its moderation and accommodation to partition. At the party's discussion of the draft in 1959, member Jack Bennett presented a critique arguing that the national question remained pressing, which Murray rejected. According to Byers, Murray replied that the Irish economy was capitalist, that the country was "not a colony", and that national problems such as partition would be solved "on the way to Socialism". A revised version was adopted by the CPNI after his death as Ireland's Path to Socialism in 1962.

== Political views ==
=== Comintern and Stalinism ===
The Dictionary of Irish Biography describes Murray as a loyal exponent of Moscow's policies, applied with varying flexibility to Irish circumstances. Cunningham wrote that he remained a loyal advocate of Comintern policy for as long as the Comintern existed, and a defender of the Soviet Union afterwards. Bowler characterised Murray as a Stalinist who was "no automaton" and applied a flexible intellect to a range of circumstances. Byers has argued that Murray often took issue with Comintern directives, and wrote that he defended "actually existing socialism" until his death while regularly defying the "Stalinist" stereotype. In his doctoral thesis of October 2012, Byers argued that Murray developed independent, nationally specific policies for the CPI, often arguing for a liberal interpretation of Comintern policy, and on a number of occasions anticipated shifts in Comintern thinking. He also argued that Murray failed to develop a communist-republican synthesis, but articulated an inclusive, left social democratic vision of republicanism.

This interpretation has been disputed. Reviewing the biography in The Irish Times, Mike Milotte argued that Byers understated the CPI's acquiescence to Moscow, and that the Comintern tolerated debate about implementation but not alternative policies. Paul O'Brien made a similar criticism in the Irish Marxist Review, while praising Murray's part in the Belfast Outdoor Relief strike and the recruitment of Irish volunteers for Spain. Byers's own conclusion was that Murray's career should be viewed through the tension between his internationalism and his republicanism.

=== National question and class ===
Murray's pamphlet The Irish Case for Communism argued that the 1921 Anglo-Irish Treaty was a bargain between British imperialism and the Irish capitalist class, that the struggle for independence was therefore bound up with the struggle against Irish capitalism, and that only the working class in alliance with working farmers could lead it to a "Workers' and Farmers' Republic". The pamphlet described the Labour Party as representing the interests of senior trade union officials, and Fianna Fáil as representing smaller manufacturers. Its programme proposed nationalisation without compensation of large estates and major industries, the centralisation of credit in a state bank, the abolition of denominational education and the replacement of parliamentary government with committees elected by occupation. Bowler observed that the pamphlet contained no specific discussion of Protestant workers in the North and made no mention of women.

Murray's position on the national question changed over time. In 1930 he wrote that nationalist slogans should be replaced by class against class, but in a speech to the CPGB congress in November 1932 he described the national issue as a powerful weapon of the working class. At the Republican Congress in 1934, he argued that "you cannot smash capitalism until you get rid of British imperialism". Speaking to the 13th congress of the CPGB in February 1935, he said that the "imperialist-imposed freedom" of the previous thirteen years was "not any more palatable than the slavery that existed before". O'Connor states that he remained a Connollyite at heart, and that after the start of the "economic war" he pleaded in Moscow for a return to anti-imperialist politics, which the Comintern approved with provisos. Murray described the truce of 1921 as a compromise with disastrous consequences. In 1939 he described Fianna Fáil as truly representative of the nationalist masses.

In the late 1950s, Bowler wrote, Murray argued in The Irish Way to Socialism that the border would be resolved after the struggle for socialism, through the election of a parliamentary majority, in line with the Soviet policy of "peaceful co-existence".

=== Religion ===
Murray was an avowed atheist, but he sought throughout his career to prevent religion from becoming a divisive issue within the communist movement. After the pastoral letter of October 1931 he assured the feminist Hanna Sheehy Skeffington that the RWG would take a correct position on clerical interference, and in 1933 he told republicans that it was "not inconsistent for a Catholic to be a communist". During the Spanish Civil War he cultivated a friendship with the former Sinn Féin vice-president Fr Michael O'Flanagan, and helped to arrange the visit of a Basque priest to Ireland, in order to contest the portrayal of the conflict as a religious one.

== Personal life ==
Murray's younger sister Kate was involved with Cumann na mBan. (Note: She was later awarded the Survivors Medal and received a military pension until she died in 1980.)

While at the Lenin School, Murray married a Russian woman who was a member of the Soviet party. She was denied permission to leave the Soviet Union when he returned to Ireland, and he declined to adopt Soviet citizenship. Byers notes that, unlike Breslin, who took Soviet citizenship and never returned, Murray arrived in Dublin in July 1930 without his wife. Cunningham observed that Murray did not contest the ruling. Byers wrote that her fate goes unrecorded in his private papers, which may have been amended to remove any trace of the marriage.

He later married Margaret Gannon, a sister of the IRA and CPI member Bill Gannon and from a republican family in Dublin. The marriage took place in Dublin, and the couple had no children. Margaret survived him. During the Second World War the couple lived with Michael McInerney and his family in Belfast. (Note: They lived in a house on the Limestone Road, and afterwards at 32 Lincoln Avenue, which was Murray's final address.) Murray let out the family farm. (Note: O'Connor states that after his father died in the 1950s, Murray rented out the family farm, keeping the farmhouse for occasional use. Byers, by contrast, states that both of Murray's parents had died by the mid-1940s, and that Murray reluctantly sublet the farm to a distant relative in order to have a regular income.)

Murray's friendship with Peadar O'Donnell, whom he met in 1922, lasted for the rest of his life. The Dictionary of Irish Biography describes him as respected for his erudition and popular with many who differed from him ideologically. Cunningham noted that sources describe him as self-effacing and affable, and that he may have gone "on the booze" for extended periods. Byers wrote that Murray took to carrying a gun for protection during the 1930s.

== Death and legacy ==
Murray became ill in March 1961 and died at the Royal Victoria Hospital in Belfast on 25 May 1961. He was buried in Dundonald Cemetery on 30 May. About 300 people attended, including O'Donnell, George Gilmore and Seán Nolan. (Note: Byers records that a piper played "Lament for the Dead", Jimmy Graham sang Connolly's "Rebel Song", and the service concluded with "The Internationale".) Tributes included one by Elizabeth Gurley Flynn in the American Worker, and an obituary by Michael McInerney in The Irish Times, and the London district of the CPGB held a memorial meeting. Murray's private papers are held in the Public Record Office of Northern Ireland. O'Donnell, who published Not Yet Emmet as a postscript to Murray's life in 1985, described him as "the greatest achievement of the Republican Left".

Byers observed in 2012 that Murray had received only limited attention from academics and partisan writers, and that earlier studies had included Bowler's overview, a short essay by O'Connor and a 1998 study by Denis Smyth. His doctoral thesis, submitted to the University of Ulster in October 2012, drew on some 4,000 Comintern documents relating to Ireland, Murray's private papers and the Seán Nolan and Geoffrey Palmer Collection of the CPI. Byers's biography Seán Murray: Marxist-Leninist and Irish Socialist Republican was published by Irish Academic Press in 2015. Cunningham described it as generally balanced and judicious, though he noted that it conveys little of Murray's personality. Kenny called it detailed and impressively researched, but argued that it did not place Murray sufficiently within Irish political life. Flynn praised its account of the wider Irish left and Carroll called it well researched, while Milotte and O'Brien criticised its treatment of Stalinism.

== Publications ==
- With James Larkin Jnr, The Life and Struggle of the Working-Class and Peasantry in Ireland (Moscow, 1930)
- "The Reign of Terror in Ireland", The Daily Worker (New York), 2 January 1932
- The Irish Case for Communism (Dublin: Sphinx Publications, 1933, reprinted New York: Workers Library Publishers, 1934)
- Ireland's Path to Freedom, manifesto of the Communist Party of Ireland (1933)
- Ireland's Fight for Freedom and the Irish in the USA (New York: Workers' Library, 1934)
- The Irish Revolt: 1916 and After (Communist Party of Ireland and Communist Party of Great Britain, 1936)
- Craigavon in the Dock (Belfast, 1938)
- "Robinson Crusoe Politics", The Bell (September 1946)
- The Irish Way to Socialism (draft, 1958), revised and published posthumously as Ireland's Path to Socialism (1962)

== Notes ==
Party political offices
New office	General Secretary of the Communist Party of Ireland; 1933–1941	Succeeded by Tommy Watters
