= Communist Party of Ireland (disambiguation) =

Communist Party of Ireland may refer to:

- Communist Party of Ireland (1920) - The party renamed in 1920
- Communist Party of Ireland (1933) - The party founded in 1933
- Communist Party of Ireland - The party founded in 1970
- Communist Party of Ireland (Marxist–Leninist) - The party founded in 1965 which used the name "Communist Party of Ireland (Marxist–Leninist)" from 1970 onwards
