= Northern Ireland Women's Rights Movement =

Northern Ireland Women's Rights Movement (NIWRM) was a women's rights group founded in 1975 in Belfast, Northern Ireland.

The NIWRM aimed to be an umbrella group which brought together unionist and nationalist women's rights organisations from across Northern Ireland. The NIWRM focussed on a range of issues, however was initially founded to campaign for the 1975 Sex Discrimination Act to be extended to Northern Ireland, a goal which was achieved in 1976.

== History ==
The NIWRM was founded in 1975 by students from Queens University, Belfast, they were joined by others from across the women's and civil rights movement including individuals from the Northern Ireland Civil Rights Association, Communist Party of Ireland and other non-affiliated women. They included Inez McCormack, Madge Davison and Ann Hope.

The group developed a charter of campaign issues including action of domestic violence, societal discrimination and legal reform; the group however avoided taking any direct stance on reproductive rights seeing the issue as too contentious. Its campaigns contributed to the introduction of the Sex Discrimination Order 1976 and the Equal Opportunities Commission for Northern Ireland.

Into the late 1970s the group began to splinter, as offshoot organisations such as the Socialist Women's Group were formed following disputes within the NIWRM over admittance of men to the organisation. Despite this, it continued activity, and in 1980 it opened the first women's centre in Belfast. In 1994, it organised a visit from Angela Davis to Belfast.
