= 1933 Dublin riot =

Riot in Ireland following a mass stabbing

- Date: 27 March to 30 March 1933
- Location: 67 Great Strand Street, Dublin, Ireland; 53°20′48″N 6°16′1″W
- Caused by: Anti-communism; Political tension; Clerical rhetoric
- Goals: Destruction of Connolly House on Great Strand Street; Purging Communism in Ireland
- Methods: Rioting; Arson; Assault
- Result: Destruction of Connolly House on Great Strand Street; Communist groups in Dublin forced underground

Parties
Revolutionary Workers' Groups	St Patrick’s Anti-Communism League

Lead figures
Left-wing leaders: Charles Donnelly; Bill Gannon; Sean Murray; Frank Ryan	

Number
30≈ communists and left-wing activists	5,000 to 6,000≈ anti-communist rioters
- Unknown amount of Garda Siochana

The 1933 Dublin riot, also known as the siege of Connolly House, was a multi-night anti-communist riot that occurred in Dublin, Ireland between 27 and 30 March 1933. The riot took place during a time of heavy political unrest in Ireland, occurring after the tense 1932 and 1933 Irish general elections. The riot was also spurred on by anti-communist rhetoric preached by clerics in the Catholic Church in Ireland. The primary target of the riot was Connolly House on Great Strand Street near Bachelors Walk, which served as the headquarters of the Revolutionary Workers' Groups (RWG), a communist political party. A crowd reportedly as large as 6,000 people gathered outside the building and attempted to gain access. They eventually succeeded, several buildings were set alight during the riot, and reportedly over 20 people were injured. Other locations in Dublin associated with left-wing politics were also attacked over four nights. The riot has been described as the most intense political violence the Irish Free State had experienced to that point since the Irish Civil War of the early 1920s.

== Background ==
=== Political tensions ===
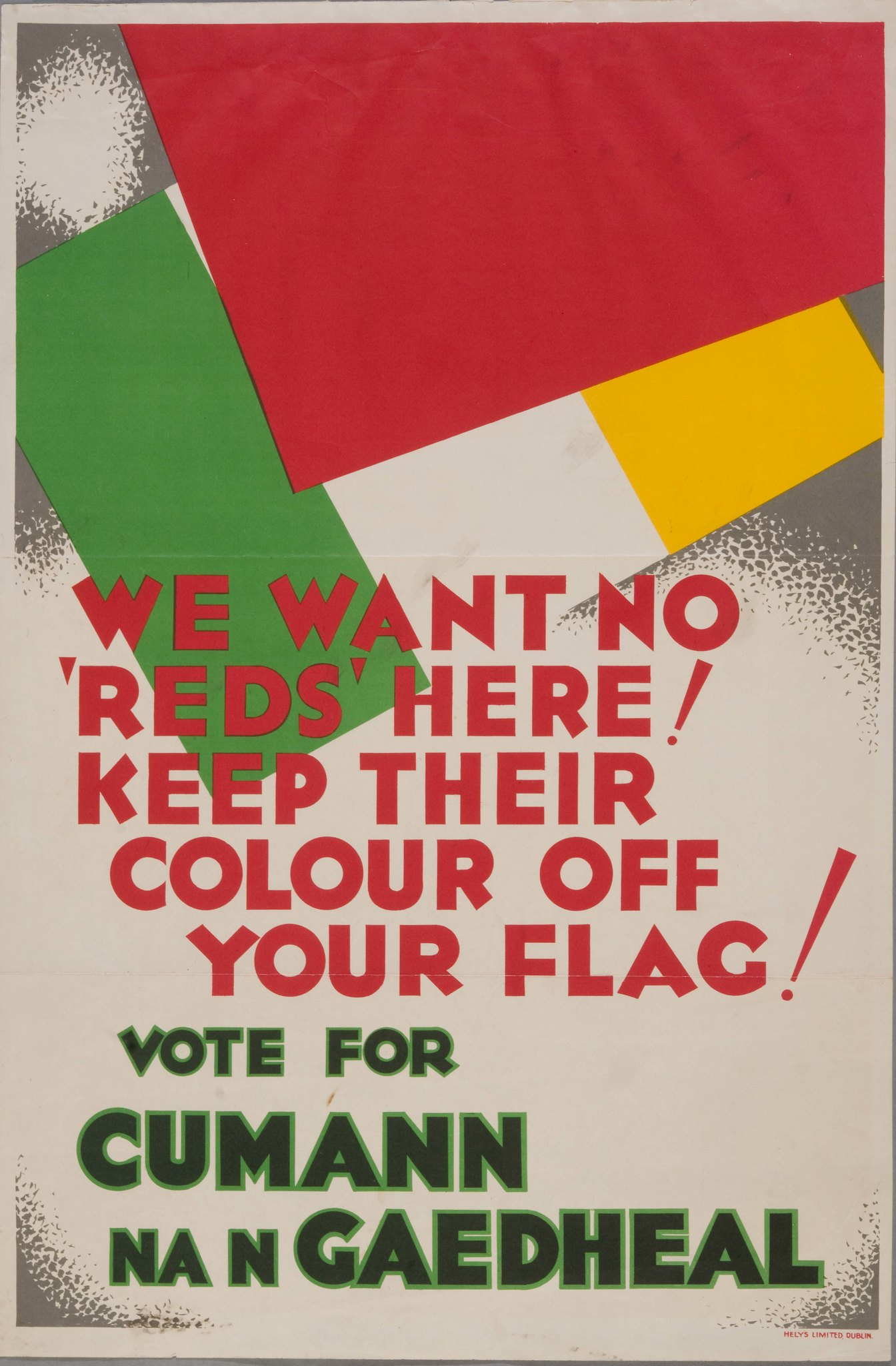
Anti-communist political posters featured heavily in the 1932 general election

Following the 1932 general election, the Irish Free State experienced its first-ever peaceful transition of power between two opposing political parties, when Fianna Fáil defeated the sitting Cumann na nGaedhael. Broadly, Cumann na nGaedhael represented those who had fought on the Pro-Treaty side of the Irish civil war, while Fianna Fáil represented those who opposed it. The division between the two sides was stark and bitter. Although Cumann na nGaedhael respected the result of the 1932 election and willingly stood aside, the party soon thereafter began heavily mingling with the Army Comrades Association (better known as "the Blueshirts"), a far-right paramilitary organisation. In parallel, although not officially aligned, Fianna Fáil was heavily associated with the Irish Republican Army paramilitary organisation. Through these paramilitary organisations, both sides engaged in low levels of political violence across Ireland, with political meetings being frequent targets.

==== Revolutionary Workers' Groups banned and unbanned ====
The existence of the Revolutionary Workers' Groups (RWG) was a source of political tension itself: the RWG was banned by the Cosgrave government in 1931, under the Coercion Act, along with 11 other organisations. The ban was lifted by the de Valera government following the victory of Fianna Fáil at the 1932 general election.

=== Clerical anti-communism ===
In October 1931, the Catholic Church in Ireland issued a pastoral letter condemning the Irish Republican Army, Saor Éire, and other left-wing groups which they accused of being communist and atheist in nature. The letter stated that Saor Éire was a "frankly communistic organisation trying to impose upon the Catholic soil of Ireland the same materialistic regime, with its fanatic hatred of God, as now dominates Russia and threatens to dominate Spain". Another section of the letter stated: "You cannot be a Catholic and a Communist. One stands for Christ, the other for Anti-Christ".

In 1932, Dublin hosted the 1932 Eucharistic Congress. The event was of major significance to the emerging Irish state and was an outward show of the power of the Catholic Church in Ireland. Historians have suggested the Eucharistic Congress emboldened the clergy to use their influence over secular society in Ireland.

In 1933, the Bishop of Kildare and Leighlin Matthew Cullen issued another pastoral letter which condemned left-wing groups in Ireland, in which he stated:

Be prepared to fight…There is no reason why anyone who undertakes to propagate Communism should be allowed do so

On Saint Patrick's Day, 17 March 1933, Cardinal Joseph MacRory, Primate of Ireland, issued a sermon condemning communism and called for a united front "to oppose those enemies of God who pose as friends of men".

Many historians have directly attributed the impetuous of the 1933 Dublin riot to these inflammatory statements made by members of the clergy.

==== St Patrick's Anti-Communism League ====
In 1933 an explicitly pro-Catholic, anti-communist organisation was formed in Ireland called the St Patrick's Anti-Communism League (SPACL). Although only it is infancy by the time of the riot in late March 1933, the Gardaí (police) did suspect that they were involved in the rioting.

=== Anti-communist campaign in Leitrim ===
In late 1932, republican and communist James Gralton returned from the United States to his native County Leitrim, where he soon set up a branch of the Revolutionary Workers' Groups as well as a meeting hall. Gralton quickly became a lighting rod for controversy in the area and a campaign to oppose his political activism quickly mounted. Gralton's hall was condemned as a place of sin by local clergy and was burnt to the ground in December 1932. In February 1933, a court ruled that Gralton (who had been born in Ireland) was an illegal alien and was to be deported to the United States. Gralton fled while political supporters who came from outside the area to help him were assaulted. Gralton was eventually captured and deported in August 1933.

The 1933 Dublin Riot occurred simultaneously with the anti-Gralton campaign.

== Riot ==
=== Monday 27 October ===
A number of sources claim that the first of the rioting took place on Monday 27 October 1933, following a particularly vitriolic sermon at St Mary's Pro-Cathedral on Marlborough Street. Anti-communists walked from the Pro-Cathedral to Connolly House on Great Strand Street and attempted to gain access to the building. However, they were repulsed. Oral history suggests the number of anti-communists was a few hundred people.

In his 2006 autobiography, Bob Doyle admits to having attended the Pro-Cathedral the night of 27 October and to have heard the anti-communist sermon. Doyle, 17 years old at the time, was inspired by the sermon to riot later that night. When Doyle saw newspaper reports the following day describing the rioters as "Hooligans", Doyle felt ashamed of himself. He later sought out Sean Murray at a bookstore and asked about his politics. This conversation led to Doyle entering left-wing and anti-fascist politics for the rest of his life.

The Irish Times reported that two men had to be rescued by Gardaí after a mob on Aston Quay beat them and attempted to throw them into the River Liffey.

=== Tuesday 28 October ===
A mob returned again to Connolly House the evening of Tuesday, 28 October. The crowd had swelled greatly from the previous night and was now in the thousands, boosted by newspaper reports of the previous night. Likewise, many left-wing activists had come also on learning of the events of the previous night, including Hanna Sheehy-Skeffington and Lile O'Donnell (Note: The wife of Peadar O'Donnell.). Once again the mob was repelled from the building.

=== Wednesday 29 October ===
The mob returned a third time on the evening of Wednesday 29 October. Inside Connolly House that night were Seán Murray and Donie O'Neill of the RWG, but also other left-wing activists such as Bill Gannon, Jack Nalty, and Charlie Gilmore. During renewed fighting Charlie Gilmore began firing from a handgun, but this did not disperse the crowd. This time, the mob was able to ransack and destroy Connolly House after a building next door was set on fire, forcing the occupants of Connolly House to escape by rooftop. According to one of Connolly House's defenders, Eugene Dowling, it was 10.30 pm when the mob broke through an iron gate into a furniture store next door and then reached the back of Connolly House. In Dowling's account, several people inside the House were armed and began shooting once the mob entered the building.

Dowling's account of the night suggests many of Connolly House's defenders were able to escape by calmly entering a next-door Italian fish and chip shop through an adjoining upstairs door. Amidst the chaos, Dowling claims the defenders were able to sit down at tables and eat a meal, and were not suspected by the frenzied crowd who were focused on next door.

On the same night a mob targeted the residence of Charlotte Despard at 63 Eccles Street, which also served as the location for the Irish Workers' College and the Friends of Soviet Russia. However, a prepared defence comprising a substantial group of workers prevented extensive damage, though windows were broken in the incident. Additionally, the mob attacked the offices of the Workers' Union of Ireland on Marlborough Street and the Irish Unemployed Workers' Movement on North Great George's Street.

There were five arrests on 29 October, four from the mob and one, Charlie Gilmore, from Connolly House. Gilmore was arrested as he fled the burning House by rooftop, although he was later acquitted of all charges. Among those arrested, three individuals were from Dublin's inner city, while one, Joseph Lynskey of Rathmines, worked as a clerk in the office of the Garda Superintendent for 'C' Division, which included the Great Strand Street area. Superintendent Hurley reported to his superiors that he had "admonished" Lynskey, deeming further disciplinary action unnecessary. Lynskey was subsequently fined £50 and ordered to maintain peace for twelve months. In contrast, Michael Meehan, a labourer from Lower Gloucester Street, received a fourteen-day jail sentence.

A contingent of sixty Gardaí had been assembled at Store Street early in the evening, prepared to move to Connolly House if necessary. However, Gardaí resources were significantly strained by a major fire at a furniture store and auction rooms on Bachelors Walk. The fire attracted large crowds, many of whom subsequently joined the processions moving toward Great Strand Street, located just minutes away. Garda reports indicate that even a substantial force would have struggled to contain the gathering, noting "It is clear that this movement against Communism is very strong in Dublin and elaborate police arrangements will require to be made to prevent the destruction of premises used by the Communist Party". By the end of Wednesday 29 October, the Gardaí has lost faith in their ability to protect Connolly House and instead focused on protecting the next-in-line targets such as the Irish Workers' College.

=== Thursday 30 October ===
Crowds again tried to attack the Irish Workers' College and what was left of Connolly House on 30 October, but were repelled by baton charges by members of the Garda Síochána.

== Reactions, impact and analysis ==
=== Contemporary reactions ===
Neither the leaders of the Labour nor Republican movements in Ireland condemned the riot, each seeking to avoid being linked to communism. Only a handful of notable political firebrands spoke out against the riot, such as Maud Gonne and Hanna Sheehy-Skeffington. An Phoblacht, the official newspaper of the Irish Republican Army, branded the riot the work of "Hitlerists" in Ireland; "Hitlerism is a disease, which until now appeared to be confined to the European Continent. But it now appears to be developing into a plague, and likely to sweep all over the world. It has manifested itself in Dublin in the last few days. Like witch-hunting of old, it is likely to become a sport, unless rudely checked". An Phoblacht also alleged that Cumann na nGaedheal supporters and members of the Army Comrades Association participated in the riot: "The smaller organised element was mainly directed by Cumann na nGaedheal supporters and members of the A.C.A, ably assisted by a few religiously minded fanatics who had been fanned into the belief that if they lynched a Communist and sang hymns they were serving God.". Historian Dónal Ó Drisceoil has supported this viewpoint.

The Irish Press, a newspaper closely aligned to Fianna Fáil, did write opinion pieces on the riot, but focused on condemning the violence rather than defending the activists.

The riot forced communists in Ireland underground. In June 1933, the newly-formed Communist Party of Ireland, which succeeded the Revolutionary Workers' Groups, held meetings at a location on Leinster Street owned by the Franciscans and was held under the guise that they were the Dublin Total Abstinence Association, a teetotal group. Historian Emmet O'Connor estimated that by 1934 the Communist Party in Ireland was nearing extinction, with membership in Dublin reduced to approximately seventy-five individuals, of whom only slightly more than twenty maintained regular active participation.

=== Analysis by Historians ===
Historian RM Douglas has described the riot as the worst violence to take place in Dublin to that point since the Civil War.

Historian Donal Fallon has noted that a number of socialists in their recollection of events decade attributed much of the violence to members of "Animal gangs". "Animal gangs" were street gangs of lumpenproletariat active in Dublin between the late 1930s and 1950s. Fallon has stated he believes that these recollections cannot be correct as the "Animal Gangs" did not emerge until later in the decade and that no contemporary reports from 1933 notes Animal gangs as being involved in the riot. In fact, contemporary reports contradict the later recollections, as they note the presence of "well-dressed young men and women" at the riot. Fallon has suggested that a large number of middle-class people took part in the riot and that mistaken recollections about lumpenproletariat animal gangs by socialists is result of them not be willing to engage with how unpopular communism was in Ireland in the period. A 1976 radio documentary created by RTÉ Radio 1 also noted the presence of "respectably dressed" individuals and suggested the mob contained members of the Irish civil service.

Historian Brian Hanely has stated "The violence of March 1933 must be seen in the context of an atmosphere of anti-Communist hysteria, whipped up by the Catholic Church. In the Ireland of the 1930s, the label of Communist was not merely a smear, but a potentially violent threat."
