= Connolly Youth Movement =

Communist youth organisation in Ireland

Connolly Youth Movement Ógra Uí Chonghaile
- Insignia of the CYM, introduced 2023
- Founded: 1963
- Preceded by: Northern Ireland Young Communist League
- Ideology: Communism; Marxism–Leninism; Irish republicanism; Euroscepticism
- Mother party: Communist Party of Ireland (1963–2021)
- International affiliation: WFDY
- Magazine: Forward
- Website: www.cym.ie

The Connolly Youth Movement (CYM, Irish: Ógra Uí Chonghaile) is an all-Ireland communist and Marxist–Leninist youth organisation named after revolutionary socialist James Connolly. It was founded in 1963 and was affiliated with the Communist Party of Ireland until 2021. It is a member of the World Federation of Democratic Youth.

== History and current status ==
The Connolly Youth Movement was founded in 1963. In 1970, with the merger of the Irish Workers' Party and Communist Party of Northern Ireland to form the Communist Party of Ireland (CPI), the Northern Ireland Young Communist League joined the CYM, with Madge Davison as its general secretary. The organisation dissolved in the early 1990s and was re-formed by the CPI in 2005.

In January 2021, CYM announced that an Extraordinary Ard Fheis had voted to rescind its support for the programme of the Communist Party of Ireland and to disaffiliate from the party. The Communist Party issued its own statement on the split, saying that several dual CPI–CYM members had recently been expelled from the party for alleged breaches of discipline and factional behaviour.

== Policies and ideology ==
The CYM is constitutionally a Marxist-Leninist organisation. It opposes the Good Friday Agreement and the European Union. In July 2022 it published a new programme, Cause of Youth, Cause of Ireland. This included a commitment to Irish unity, revival of Irish culture and promotion of the Irish language, civil rights, free education, free healthcare on an all-Ireland basis, action on climate change, a public housing programme, international solidarity, and "a comprehensive system of worker's rights".

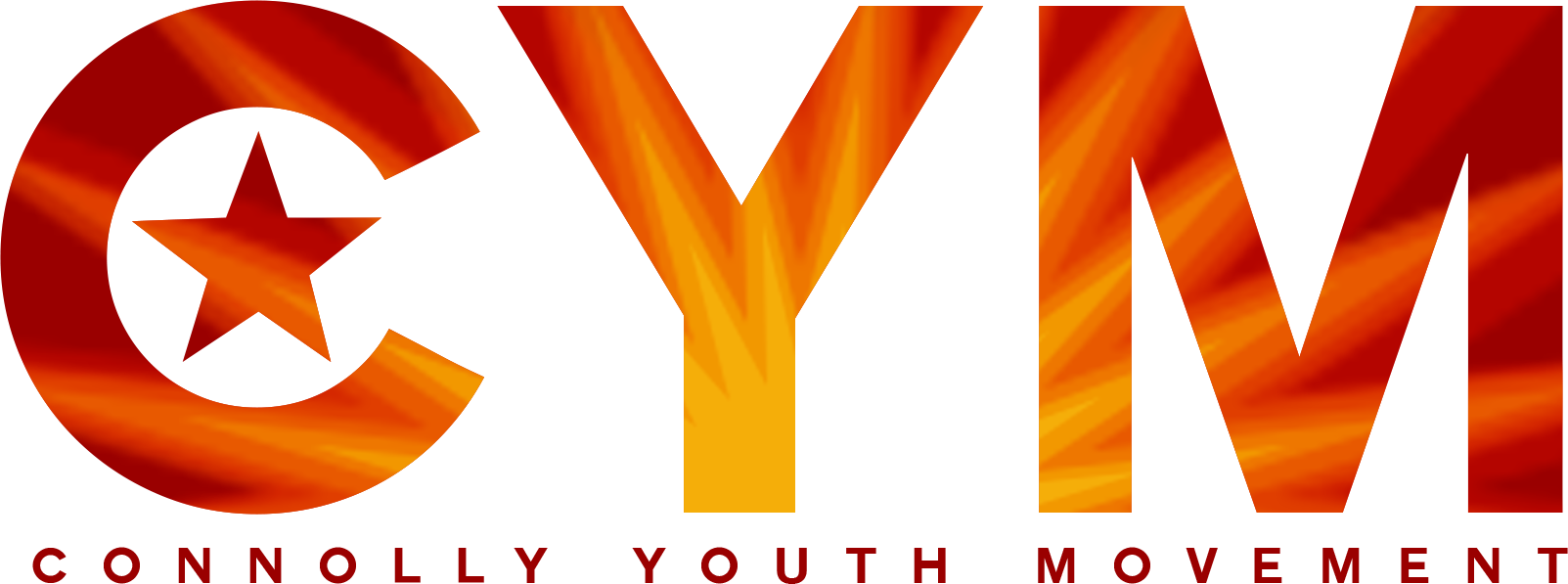
Logo of the group in 2020

In 2020, CYM's then General Secretary Alex Homits stated that "poverty and trafficking are the leading creators of sex workers." The CYM have offered solidarity to those engaged in sex work, and support for decriminalisation of the purchase of sex.

The CYM condemned the Russian invasion of Ukraine as an "inter-capitalist conflict" and a "highly dangerous and irresponsible course of action which will lead to the loss of many lives and create a fusebox of conflict". It criticised the Ukrainian government and said the eastward enlargement of NATO was a cause of the war. The CYM also recognises the Russian-controlled breakaway states of the Donetsk People's Republic and the Luhansk People's Republic in Ukraine.

The CYM has denied China's human rights abuses against Uyghurs.

The CYM opposed the Israeli invasion of Gaza, calling it a genocide, and supported calls to expel the Israeli ambassador. Previously they have also called for the release of Palestinian political prisoners and expressed support for Palestinian self-determination and opposition to Israel's illegal settlements in the West Bank. The CYM is also a supporter of the BDS campaign.

== Activities ==
In 2017, members of the Cork branch of the Connolly Youth Movement occupied a formerly vacant house near UCC, saying the action was intended to highlight the housing crisis. In 2018, two of these buildings were repossessed by the Garda Emergency Response Unit acting in conjunction with a contractor for the O'Dwyer Asset Management Company that owned the vacant properties. The first occupation, still ongoing as of 2021, is referred to as Connolly Barracks by the organisation.

The Connolly Youth Movement was involved in highly publicised instances of direct action in 2018 and 2019 when members of the movement disrupted Fine Gael public meetings in Cork in protest of government policy on homelessness and wealth inequality. One such action was criticised by Taoiseach Leo Varadkar, who stated "I think no matter what political party you come from or what your political views, we should all be committed to democracy and freedom of speech and trying to shout other people down and trying to shut down their meetings is profoundly anti-democratic". The CYM responded that it had a right to challenge and question the government on policy issues. In a March 2020 interview, CYM General Secretary Alex Homits said "Socialism will not and cannot be delivered through the ballot box and the CYM and its membership will not lie about this or endorse those who do".

In July 2020, Connolly Youth activists, supported by members of Saoradh, the Irish Republican Socialist Party and Lasair Dhearg, smashed an Irish Freedom Party stall in Belfast.

In March 2023, members of the Connolly Youth Movement disrupted an event in Dublin City University where Bertie Ahern was receiving an honorary doctorate, calling him an "architect of the financial crisis" before being removed from the venue.

In June 2023, Connolly Youth activists holding an anti-NATO banner disrupted a forum discussing Irish defence policy. Micheál Martin, who was giving a speech, accused them of being undemocratic and trying to shut down debate.

== Publications ==
The CYM publishes a print magazine titled Forward, with online articles published under the same title.

== Affiliations ==
- World Federation of Democratic Youth

== Prominent past members of CYM ==
- Madge Davison – served as General Secretary of the CYM.
- Declan Bree – served as Chairperson of the CYM
- Manus O'Riordan – served on the executive committee of the CYM
