= William McCullough (Northern Ireland politician) =

William H. McCullough
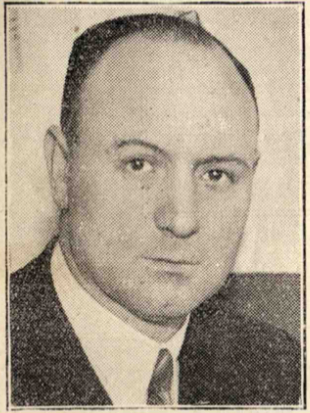
- McCullough, circa 1944

General Secretary of the Communist Party of Northern Ireland
- In office 1942–1951
- Preceded by: Office established

Personal details
- Born: 1901
- Died: 17 December 1967 (aged 65–66)
- Party: Communist Party of Northern Ireland
- Other political affiliations: Republican Congress; Communist Party of Ireland
- Occupation: Trade unionist

William H. McCullough (1901 – 17 December 1967), some times known as Billy McCullough, was a communist politician in Northern Ireland.

McCullough became a trade unionist at an early age, initially in the National Union of Railwaymen, where he became branch secretary, then in the Amalgamated Engineering Union, where he was Belfast chairman, then in the National Association of Theatrical Television and Kine Employees, in which he was Irish area secretary.

McCullough first became politically prominent in the Republican Congress. He was also active in the Communist Party of Ireland (CPI), becoming secretary of its Belfast branch in 1934, and organised Irish recruits to the International Brigades during the Spanish Civil War. In 1940, he was imprisoned alongside Betty Sinclair on the charge of causing "disaffection" among workers due to articles in the Irish Workers' Weekly opposing the early stages of World War II.

By 1942, McCullough was acknowledged as the leading communist in Belfast, and he was elected as the General Secretary of the Communist Party of Northern Ireland, formed the previous year from the division of the CPI. This was despite concerns expressed by J. R. Campbell about his tendency to "underestimate the significance of the national question". His period as secretary was the most successful for the party, with membership reaching more than 1,000, with recruitment almost entirely from the Protestant population. McCullough stood in the 1945 Northern Ireland general election in Belfast Bloomfield, taking 36.7% of the votes and second place. However, overspending on the election campaign and rapidly declining membership led Bob Stewart of the Communist Party of Great Britain to propose laying off all members employed by the CPNI, reducing McCullough's role as he had to find work.

McCullough remained active in the CPNI, standing at the 1949 election, but in addition to a unionist he faced a Northern Ireland Labour Party opponent, and took only 3.9% of the vote, and although the CPI's official history describes his time as secretary ending in 1946, party documents as late as 1951 still describe him as holding the post.

Party political offices
Preceded by Sean Murray	General Secretary of the Communist Party of Northern Ireland; 1942–1946?	Succeeded by Hugh Moore?
