= Andy Barr (disambiguation) =

Andy Barr (born 1973) is a U.S. representative from Kentucky.

Andy or Andrew Barr may also refer to:

- Andy Barr (Irish politician) (1913–2003), Northern Irish communist and trade unionist
- Andrew Barr (born 1973), Australian politician
- Andrew Barr (musician), Canadian drummer of The Slip and The Barr Brothers
