= 1946 Cork Borough by-election =

By-election to the 12th Dáil

- 14 June 1946
- Turnout: 29,695 (55.4%)
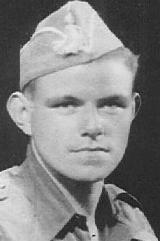
	McGrath	O'Driscoll
Nominee	Patrick McGrath	Michael O'Driscoll	Michael O'Riordan
Party	Fianna Fáil	Fine Gael	Cork Socialist Party
First preferences	14,230	9,707	3,184
Percentage	47.9%	32.7%	10.7%
Final count	15,170	10,503	3,688
TD before election
William Dwyer
Independent
TD after election
Patrick McGrath
Fianna Fáil

A Dáil by-election was held in the constituency of Cork Borough in Ireland on Friday, 14 June 1946, to fill a vacancy in the 12th Dáil. It followed the resignation of independent TD William Dwyer on 29 March 1946.

In 1946, Cork Borough was a four seat constituency comprising Cork city and the electoral division of Blackrock in County Cork.

The writ of election to fill the vacancy was agreed by the Dáil on 22 May 1946.

The by-election was won by the Fianna Fáil candidate Patrick McGrath.

The surplus votes of the elected candidate Patrick McGrath, were distributed after being declared elected. This was because there was a possibility another candidate could have reached the threshold of a third of a quota which would have meant their election deposit was returned to them.

== Result ==
1946 Cork Borough by-election
Party	Candidate	FPv%	Count		
Party	Candidate	FPv%	1	2	3
Fianna Fáil	Patrick McGrath	47.9	14,230	15,170	
Fine Gael	Michael O'Driscoll	32.7	9,707	10,277	10,503
Cork Socialist Party	Michael O'Riordan	10.7	3,184	3,592	3,688
Independent	Tom Barry	8.7	2,574		
Electorate: 53,623 Valid: 29,695 Quota: 14,848 Turnout: 55.4%
