= Edwina Stewart =

Communist and civil-rights activist (1934–2020)

- Born: Edwina Menzies; 11 May 1934; Belfast, Northern Ireland
- Died: 29 May 2020 (aged 77)
- Education: Stranmillis Teacher Training College
- Organization: Northern Ireland Civil Rights Association
- Political party: Communist Party of Ireland
- Other political affiliations: Communist Youth League
- Spouse: Jimmy Stewart
- Mother: Sadie Menzies

Edwina Stewart (11 May 1934 – 29 May 2020) was a Northern Irish communist and civil-rights activist.

== Biography ==
Edwina Stewart was born 11 May 1934 in East Belfast to Sadie and Eddie Menzies. She had four sisters. While her family was of the Protestant community her parents were atheists and founders of the Communist Party of Ireland. Stewart attended Stranmillis Teacher Training College where she became a teacher, going on to work in both Ashfield Girls’ School and Comber High School. Stewart founded the Communist Youth League and attended the World Youth Festival in Moscow in 1957. Stewart was elected secretary of the Northern Ireland Civil Rights Association and held the role from 1969 until 1977.

Stewart gave up her job when she was reported to have been one of the speakers in Derry on Bloody Sunday. Other speakers that day were Máire Drumm and Bernadette Devlin. Pressure from groups such as Ulster Vanguard forced her to leave. There were protests by students and she was boycotted by the other teachers. Death threats were published in a local newspaper. Stewart was one of the witnesses at the Saville Inquiry looking into the events of Bloody Sunday.

In 1971 Stewart became National Treasurer of the Communist Party of Ireland and was a member of the National Executive. She was also part of the National Women's Committee. The CPI was the first political party in Ireland to adopt the policy of a woman's right to choose. Among her political activities, Stewart was active in various anti-nuclear protests, helping organise meetings with the Greenham Common women in Belfast. She also opposed the Vietnam war and was active in the Irish Anti-Apartheid Movement.

== Personal life ==
Stewart married history and art teacher Jimmy Stewart from Ballymena. The couple had two daughters Helen and Moya.

== External sources ==
- Hyndman Marilyn (1996) Further Afield Journeys from a Protestant past. Beyond the Pale.
- Pollock Andy (19.2.1997) Voices of the Protestant left. Irish Times
- Ward Margaret (Ed) (2011) Celebrating Belfast Women: a city guide through women's eyes. Women's Resource and Development Agency.
