= Sadie Menzies =

Irish political activist (1914–1996)

- Born: 1914; Newtownards
- Died: 1996 (aged 81–82)

Sadie Menzies (1914–1996) was a founder member of the Revolutionary Workers Group and the Communist Party of Ireland.

== Biography ==
Sadie Menzies was born in Newtownards in 1914. Her mother worked in a mill while her father worked for famous local rose growers, the Dicksons, as their chauffeur. The family lived on a “tied cottage” plot belonging to the Dicksons.

Menzies started a secretarial course when she was fourteen. She got a job in the offices of Anderson McAuley’s department store. Eddie Menzies was a professional dancer, after losing an eye working in the shipyard. He was politically active and introduced his wife to the local Communists group. Eddie was given £250 compensation which he used to buy a newsagents on Templemore Avenue and it became a help centre for shipyard workers.

The couple had a daughter Edwina in 1934.

Menzies became a member of the Revolutionary Workers Party and in October 1932 she helped create the Outdoor Relief Strike during the 1930s depression. The event was one of the few which united Protestant and Catholic communities. Menzies became a member of the Communist Party of Ireland and the Friends of the Soviet Union. She went to Russia with a trade union delegation. Menzies took part in the anti-Rent Act campaign in 1944 as well as the 1945 election campaigns.

Through the 1940s and 1950s Menzies campaigned against the Marriage bar. She organised International Women's Day events and marched in rallies in London in 1949. Menzies was honoured in 1992 at an International Women's day event in Belfast City Hall. A street in Belfast has been named after her.
