= Belfast Bloomfield (Northern Ireland Parliament constituency) =

Constituency of the Parliament of Northern Ireland

Coordinates: 54.593°N 5.888°W

- Former Borough constituency for the Parliament of Northern Ireland
- Belfast shown within Northern Ireland

Former constituency
- Created: 1929
- Abolished: 1973
- Election method: First past the post

Belfast Bloomfield was a constituency of the Parliament of Northern Ireland.

== Boundaries ==
Belfast Bloomfield was a borough constituency located in eastern Belfast. Established in 1929, it was created when the House of Commons (Method of Voting and Redistribution of Seats) Act (Northern Ireland) 1929 introduced first-past-the-post elections throughout Northern Ireland.

The constituency was formed by dividing Belfast East into four new constituencies, one of which was Belfast Bloomfield. It remained unchanged, returning a single member of Parliament, until the Parliament of Northern Ireland was temporarily suspended in 1972 and subsequently abolished in 1973.

== Politics ==
The constituency was the most staunchly unionist in East Belfast. It was held continuously by Ulster Unionist Party candidates, although labour movement candidates sometimes polled well.

== Members of Parliament ==
Election	Member	Party
1929	Herbert Dixon, 1st Baron Glentoran	Ulster Unionist Party
1950(b)	Daniel Dixon, 2nd Baron Glentoran	Ulster Unionist Party
1961(b)	Walter Scott	Ulster Unionist Party
1973	Constituency abolished	

== Election results ==
At the 1929 and 1933 general elections, Herbert Dixon was elected unopposed.

General Election 1938: Belfast Bloomfield
Party	Candidate	Votes	%	±%
UUP	Herbert Dixon	9,446	70.3	N/A
Progressive Unionist	Phoebe Moody	3,988	29.7	New
Majority		5,458	40.6	N/A
Turnout		13,434	68.0	N/A
UUP hold		Swing	N/A	

General Election 1945: Belfast Bloomfield
Party	Candidate	Votes	%	±%
UUP	Herbert Dixon, 1st Baron Glentoran	9,995	63.3	−7.0
Communist (NI)	William McCullough	5,802	36.7	New
Majority		4,193	26.6	−14.0
Turnout		15,797	73.8	+5.8
UUP hold		Swing		

General Election 1949: Belfast Bloomfield
Party	Candidate	Votes	%	±%
UUP	Herbert Dixon, 1st Baron Glentoran	14,058	87.5	+12.2
NI Labour	Tom Boyd	1,386	8.6	New
Communist (NI)	William McCullough	623	3.9	−32.8
Majority		12,672	78.9	+52.3
Turnout		16,057	76.0	+2.2
UUP hold		Swing		

Belfast Bloomfield by-election, 1950
Party	Candidate	Votes	%	±%
UUP	Daniel Dixon, 2nd Baron Glentoran	7,609	77.3	−10.2
NI Labour	Robert S. Thompson	2,232	22.7	+14.1
Majority		5,377	54.6	−26.3
Turnout		9,841	44.7	−31.3
UUP hold		Swing		

General Election 1953: Belfast Bloomfield
Party	Candidate	Votes	%	±%
UUP	Daniel Dixon, 2nd Baron Glentoran	9,004	88.2	+0.7
Communist (NI)	Andy Barr	1,207	11.8	+7.9
Majority		7,797	76.4	−2.5
Turnout		10,211	46.4	+29.6
UUP hold		Swing		

General Election 1958: Belfast Bloomfield
Party	Candidate	Votes	%	±%
UUP	Daniel Dixon, 2nd Baron Glentoran	7,124	52.3	−35.9
NI Labour	Edward Bell	4,010	29.4	New
Ind. Unionist	Edward Courtney	2,492	18.3	New
Majority		3,114	22.9	−53.5
Turnout		13,626	63.4	+17.0
UUP hold		Swing		

1961 Belfast Bloomfield by-election
Party	Candidate	Votes	%	±%
UUP	Walter Scott	6,212	61.5	+9.2
NI Labour	Robert McFarland Bingham	3,885	38.5	+9.1
Majority		2,237	23.0	+0.1
Turnout		10,097	45.9	−17.5
UUP hold		Swing		

General Election 1962: Belfast Bloomfield
Party	Candidate	Votes	%	±%
UUP	Walter Scott	7,921	56.7	+4.4
NI Labour	Robert McFarland Bingham	6,053	43.3	+13.9
Majority		1,868	13.4	−9.5
Turnout		13,974	62.8	−0.6
UUP hold		Swing		

General Election 1965: Belfast Bloomfield
Party	Candidate	Votes	%	±%
UUP	Walter Scott	7,755	63.5	+6.8
NI Labour	Robert Caldwell	4,154	34.0	−9.3
Communist (NI)	Andy Barr	308	2.5	New
Majority		3,601	29.5	+16.1
Turnout		12,217	55.7	−5.1
UUP hold		Swing		

General Election 1969: Belfast Bloomfield
Party	Candidate	Votes	%	±%
UUP	Walter Scott	9,084	61.2	−2.3
Protestant Unionist	William Spence	3,568	24.0	New
NI Labour	Robert Caldwell	2,196	14.8	−19.2
Majority		5,516	37.2	+7.7
Turnout		14,848	70.2	+14.5
UUP hold		Swing		
