= Socialist Voice (disambiguation) =

Socialist Voice may refer to:

- Socialist Voice (Ireland), a newspaper of the Communist Party of Ireland
- Socialist Voice (1912), newspaper of the Socialist Party of Washington
- Socialist Voice (1934), newspaper of the Committee for the Preservation of the Socialist Party (United States)
- Socialist Voice: Marxist Perspectives for the 21st Century (2004-2011), an online journal published in Canada

== See also ==
- Scottish Socialist Voice
