= Northern Ireland Young Communist League =

Northern Ireland Young Communist League was a political youth movement in Northern Ireland, it was formed in 1968. It was the youth wing of the Communist Party of Northern Ireland. It was later amalgamated into the Connolly Youth Movement, following the merger of the party with the Irish Workers League to form the Communist Party of Ireland in 1970.
