= Madge Davison =

Union member

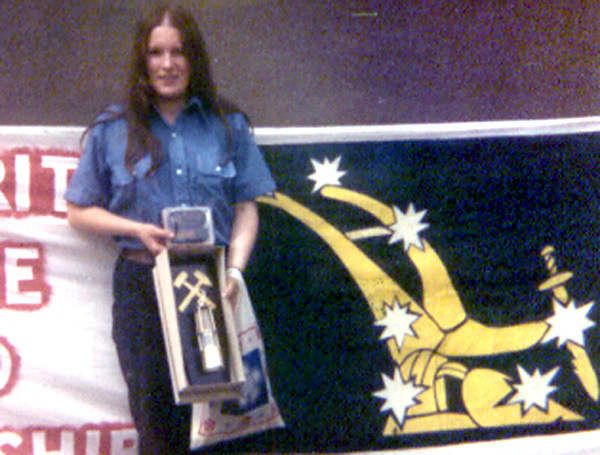
- Madge Davison in East Berlin in 1973.

Personal details
- Born: 13 June 1949 Belfast, Northern Ireland
- Died: 27 January 1991 (aged 41) Belfast, Northern Ireland
- Party: Communist Party of Ireland
- Spouse: John Hobbs
- Children: 2

Madge Davison (13 June 1949 – 27 January 1991) was a member of the National Executive Committee of the Communist Party of Ireland in the 1970s and was the first general secretary of the Connolly Youth Movement after it became an all-Ireland body in 1970.

She came from a working-class Protestant background in the Shore Road area of Belfast, Northern Ireland. She was a member of several organisations in Northern Ireland in the 1970s and 1980s, including the Northern Ireland Civil Rights Association, for which she worked as a full-time organiser.

In the late 1980s, she decided to return to college to study law, but her plans were cut short by her death from cancer in 1991. She left a husband and two sons. After her death, the Madge Davison prize at Queen's University, Belfast was established in her honour.
