= Eoin Ó Murchú =

Irish journalist

- Born: Owen Murphy; Dartford, Kent, England
- Education: Trinity College Dublin
- Occupations: Writer and retired journalist
- Writing career
- Language: Irish and English
- Notable works: Culture and Revolution in Ireland
- Literary movement: Gaelic revival

Eoin Ó Murchú is a writer and retired journalist in both Irish and English, a political activist and a former member of Official Sinn Féin/the Workers' Party, and the Communist Party of Ireland. He is currently the interim national chairperson of the Irish Communist Party.

== Biography ==
=== Background ===
Ó Murchú was born and reared in England, where he joined the Connolly Association and got involved in the republican movement. He studied at Trinity College Dublin and was a founding member of the Republican Club in the college and served as its chairman.

=== Official Sinn Féin and Communist Party ===
Ó Murchú edited the newspaper of the official republican movement United Irishman and served on the Ard Comhairle of Official Sinn Féin. His 1971 work Culture and Revolution in Ireland, formed a synthesis of Gaelic revival and Maoist themes. Ó Murchú was aligned with the faction who moved the Official Republican movement away from the armed struggle towards a socialist and electoral path. He resigned from Official Sinn Féin in 1976. After joining the Communist party he served as its southern secretary, and also edited the party's newspaper The Irish Socialist. In 1984, he stood unsuccessfully in the Laois–Offaly by-election as the Communist Party candidate.

=== RTÉ and journalism ===
He worked as political correspondent for RTÉ Raidió na Gaeltachta. Although retired from RTE, Ó Murchú remained active as a columnist and commentator appearing on Vincent Browne Tonight programme on TV3 from time to time. He also writes Political and Irish language columns for An Phoblacht.

He is a writer for Tuairisc.ie and Trinity News.

In November 2023 the Ukrainian government's Center for Countering Disinformation accused Ó Murchú of regularly posted pro-Kremlin disinformation about the Russian invasion of Ukraine. Ó Murchú has stated Ukraine was governed by Nazis, and that Russia was on the verge of winning the war.

== Publications ==
- Culture and Revolution in Ireland, Eoin Ó Murchú, Official Sinn Féin/Repsol, 1971
- The Workers' Party, Its Evolution and Its future, A Critique, Eoin Ó Murchú, Communist Party of Ireland, 1982
