= Michael O'Riordan =

Irish socialist

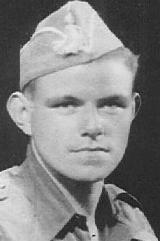
- Michael O'Riordan in his Spanish Civil War uniform, 1936

General Secretary of the Communist Party of Ireland
- In office 1970–1983
- Preceded by: None
- Succeeded by: James Stewart

Chairman of the Communist Party of Ireland
- In office 1983–1989
- Preceded by: Andy Barr
- Succeeded by: Andy Barr

Personal details
- Born: 12 November 1917 Cork, Ireland
- Died: 18 May 2006 (aged 88) Dublin, Ireland
- Party: Communist Party of Ireland
- Other political affiliations: Irish Workers' League; Cork Socialist Party
- Spouse: Kay Keohane
- Children: 3

Military service
- Allegiance: Second Spanish Republic
- Branch/service: International Brigades
- Unit: Connolly Column
- Battles/wars: Spanish Civil War

Michael O'Riordan (Irish: Mícheál Ó Ríordáin; 12 November 1917 – 18 May 2006) was the founder of the Communist Party of Ireland (3rd) and also fought with the Connolly Column in the International Brigades during the Spanish Civil War.

== Early life ==
O'Riordan was born at 37 Pope's Quay, Cork city, on 11 November 1917. He was the youngest of five children. His parents came from the West Cork Gaeltacht of Ballingeary-Gougane Barra. Despite his parents being native speakers of the Irish language, it was not until O'Riordan was interned during the Second World War that he learnt Irish.

As a teenager, he joined the republican youth movement, Fianna Éireann, and then the Irish Republican Army. Much of the IRA at the time was inclined towards left-wing politics. A lot of its activity at the time involved street fighting with the quasi-fascist Blueshirt movement, and O'Riordan fought the Blueshirts on the streets of Cork City in 1933–34. O'Riordan was friends with left-wing inclined republicans such as Peadar O'Donnell and Frank Ryan, and in 1934, he followed them into the Republican Congress – a short-lived socialist republican party.

== Spanish Civil War and Internment during the Second World War ==
O'Riordan joined the Communist Party of Ireland (1933) in 1935 while still in the IRA and worked on the communist newspaper The Irish Workers' Voice. In 1937, following the urgings of Peadar O'Donnell, several hundred Irishmen, mostly IRA or ex-IRA men, went to fight for the Spanish Republic in the Spanish Civil War with the XVth International Brigade. They were motivated in part by enmity towards the 800 or so Blueshirts, led by Eoin O'Duffy who went to Spain to fight on the "nationalist" side in the Irish Brigade. O'Riordan accompanied a party led by Frank Ryan. In the Republic's final offensive of 25 July 1938, O'Riordan carried the flag of Catalonia across the River Ebro. On 1 August, he was severely injured by shrapnel on the Ebro front. He was repatriated to Ireland the following month, after the International Brigades were disbanded.

In 1938 O'Riordan was offered an Irish Army Commission by the Irish Free State but chose instead to train IRA units in Cork. As a result of his IRA activities, during the Second World War, or the Emergency as it was known in neutral Ireland, he was interned in the Curragh internment camp from 1939 until 1943 where he was Officer Commanding of the Cork Hut and partook in Máirtín Ó Cadhain's Gaelic League classes as well as publishing Splannc (Irish for "Spark", named after Lenin's newspaper). O'Riordan was secretary of the 'Connolly group', composed of leftist internees, after his release from internment O'Riordan terminated his IRA membership.

== Political activism ==
In 1944 he was founding secretary of the Liam Mellows Branch of the Labour Party. This branch became infamous for what was regarded during the period as its controversial nature and became an intractable enemy of Branch Chair Timothy Quill. The branch was initially established by former members of the Curragh Camp's Communist Group, including Bill Nagle and Jim Savage. During this time, the IT&GWU had disaffiliated from the Labour Party and the National Labour Party was established on the basis that communists had infiltrated the Party. Quill, who was made branch chair by the Labour Party, allegedly had O’Riordan and his fellow members expelled, with the branch being dissolved. O’Riordan later accused Quill of anti-Semitism and both Quill and T.J Murphy of “red-baiting”. In 2001, O'Riordan would claim that any attempt to raise the issue of defence of communist Spain "was shouted down at Labour Party Conferences". In 1945 he was a founding secretary of the Cork Socialist Party, whose other notable members included Derry Kelleher, Kevin Neville, Máire Keohane-Sheehan (Note: Máire Keohane-Sheehan was the sister of O'Riordan's wife Kay Keohane-O'Riordan) and Thomas Murray.

O'Riordan subsequently worked as a bus conductor in Cork and was active in the Irish Transport and General Workers Union (ITGWU). He stood as a Cork Socialist Party candidate in the 1946 Cork Borough by-election, coming third behind Fianna Fáil's Patrick McGrath and Fine Gael's Michael O'Driscoll with 3,184 votes. Afterwards, he moved to Dublin where he lived in Victoria St with his wife Kay, continued to work as a bus conductor and remained active in the Irish Transport and General Workers Union.

In 1948, O'Riordan was a founding secretary of the Irish Workers' League and general secretary thereafter, and of its successor organisation the Irish Workers' Party from 1962 to 1970.

In the 1960s, he was a pivotal figure in the Dublin Housing Action Committee which agitated for clearances of Dublin's slums and for the building of social housing. There, he befriended Fr Austin Flannery, leading the then Finance Minister and future Taoiseach Charles Haughey to dismiss Flannery as "a gullible cleric" while the Minister for Local Government, Kevin Boland, described him as a "so-called cleric" for sharing a platform with O'Riordan. The Catholic Church stated that anyone who voted for him had committed mortal sin.

O'Riordan met and befriended folk musician Luke Kelly, and the two developed a "personal-political friendship". Kelly endorsed O'Riordan for election, and held a rally in his name during campaigning in 1965.

In all he ran for election five times, campaigning throughout for the establishment of a socialist republic in Ireland but given Ireland's Catholic conservatism and fear of communism, he did so without success. He did, however, receive playwright Seán O'Casey's endorsement in 1951.

O'Casey wrote: "Mr O'Riordan is his own message. He has nothing to sell but his soul. But he hasn't done that, though he will be told he'll lose it by holding on to it."

O'Riordan's participation in the Spanish Civil War was always an important part of his political identity. In 1966 he attended the International Brigades' Reunion in Berlin and was instrumental in having Frank Ryan's remains repatriated from Germany to Ireland in 1979.

He was a member of the Irish Chile Solidarity Committee and attended the 1st Party Congress of the Cuban Communist Party in 1984. He also campaigned on behalf of the Birmingham 6 and attended their Appeal trial in 1990. O'Riordan served between 1970 and 1983 as General Secretary of the Communist Party of Ireland; and from 1983 to 1988 he served as National Chairman of the party publishing many articles under the auspices of the CPI. O'Riordan staunchly pro-Soviet direction of the party led to a number of members leaving to form the Eurocommunist Irish Marxist Society.

At the February 1982 general election, O’Riordan and his party were described as “traitors to the working class” by the Communist Party of Ireland (Marxist–Leninist).

His last major public outing was in 2005 at the re-dedication of the memorial outside Dublin's Liberty Hall to the Irish veterans of the Spanish Civil War. With other veterans O'Riordan was received by President of Ireland Mary McAleese. He was also presented with Cuba's Medal of Friendship by the Cuban Consul Teresita Trujillo to Ireland on behalf of Cuban President Fidel Castro.

== Operation Splash ==
In 1969, according to Soviet dissident Vasili Mitrokhin, O'Riordan was approached by IRA leaders Cathal Goulding and Seamus Costello with a view to obtaining guns from the Soviet KGB to defend Irish republican areas of Belfast during the communal violence that marked the outbreak of the Troubles. Mitrokhin alleges that O'Riordan then contacted the Kremlin, but the consignment of arms did not reach Ireland until 1972. The operation was known as Operation Splash.

O'Riordan allegedly wrote: "Dear Comrades, I would like to outline in written form a request for assistance in acquiring the following types of arms: 2,000 assault rifles (7.62mm) and 500 rounds of ammunition for each; 150 hand-held machine-guns (9mm) and 1,000 rounds of ammunition for each."

The IRA had split in the meantime between the Provisional IRA and the Official IRA and it was the latter faction who received the Soviet arms. Mitrokhin's allegations were repeated in Boris Yeltsin's autobiography. After the split in the Republican movement, O'Riordan attempted (unsuccessfully) to bring about a reunification of the two sides.

== Connolly Column ==
His book Connolly Column: The Story of the Irishmen who fought for the Spanish Republic, 1936–1939, published in 1979, dealt with the Irish volunteers of the International Brigade who fought in support of the Spanish Republic against Franco in the Spanish Civil War (1936–1939). An updated version of the book was reprinted in 2005 and was launched by the Mayor of Dublin, Cllr. Michael Conaghan at a book launch at SIPTU headquarters, Liberty Hall. The book was the inspiration for Irish singer-songwriter Christy Moore's famous song Viva la Quinta Brigada.

Moore said: “Without Michael O’Riordan I’d never have been able to write Viva la Quince Brigada. I must have performed the song over a thousand times and every single time I sing it I think of Mick and wonder how can I ever thank him enough. In Spain in 1983 I was reading his book, Connolly Column: The Story of the Irishmen who Fought for the Spanish Republic, and I began this song as I read on. The song was lifted entirely from his book.”

== Later life and death in 2006 ==
In 1980, Magill described him as having critically supported a pro-Soviet line on every 'major issue'. In 1991, O'Riordan's wife Kay Keohane of Clonakilty, County Cork died at their home aged 81. He continued to live in their family home before moving to Glasnevin in 2000 to be close to his son Manus who lived nearby. In 1999, he described himself as an atheist and believed that communism would rise again. He lived there until falling ill in November 2005 and was taken to the Mater Hospital. His health rapidly deteriorated and he quickly developed Alzheimer's disease. Soon afterwards he was moved to St. Mary's Hospital in the Phoenix Park where he spent the final few months of his life, before his death at the age of 88. Then Labour Party leader Ruairi Quinn praised O'Riordan after his death, saying; "As leader of the Labour Party I had the honour of ensuring he received a special citation at our 2001 national conference Michael O'Riordan stood out against the tide of Irish conservatism and clerical domination that kept Ireland backward and isolated in the 1930s, 1940s and 1950s."

O'Riordan's funeral at Glasnevin Crematorium was attended by over a thousand mourners. Following a wake the previous night at Finglas Rd, hundreds turned up outside the house of his son Manus and traffic ground to a halt as family, friends and comrades – many of whom were waving the red flag of the Communist Party of Ireland – escorted O'Riordan to Glasnevin Cemetery. A secular ceremony took place led by Manus O'Riordan (Head of Research at SIPTU) with contributions from O'Riordan's family, Communist Party general secretary Eugene McCartan and IBMT representative Pauline Frasier.

The funeral congregation included politicians such as Labour Party leader Pat Rabbitte, his predecessor Ruairi Quinn, party front-bencher Joan Burton; Sinn Féin TD Seán Crowe and councillor Larry O'Toole; former Workers' Party leader Tomás Mac Giolla and former Fianna Fáil MEP Niall Andrews. Also in attendance were union leaders Jack O'Connor (SIPTU), Mick O'Reilly (ITGWU) and David Begg (ICTU). Actors Patrick Bergin, Jer O'Leary; singer Ronnie Drew; artist Robert Ballagh; newsreader Anne Doyle were also among the mourners. Tributes and were paid by President of Ireland Mary McAleese, Taoiseach Bertie Ahern, Sinn Féin leader Gerry Adams and Labour Party TDs Ruairi Quinn and Michael D. Higgins.

== Works ==
- Pages From History: On Irish-Soviet Relations (1977)

== Notes ==
Party political offices
New post	General Secretary of the Irish Workers' League; 1948–1962	Office abolished
New post	General Secretary of the Irish Workers' Party; 1962–1970	Office abolished
New post	General Secretary of the Communist Party of Ireland; 1970–1983	Succeeded by James Stewart
Preceded by Andy Barr	Chairman of the Communist Party of Ireland; 1983–1989	Succeeded by Andy Barr
