= James Stewart (Irish politician) =

Northern Irish communist (1934-2013)

General Secretary of the Communist Party of Ireland
- In office 1984–2001
- Preceded by: Michael O'Riordan
- Succeeded by: Eugene McCartan

National Chairperson of the Communist Party of Ireland
- In office 2001–2004
- Preceded by: Eugene McCartan
- Succeeded by: Lynda Walker

Personal details
- Born: 23 November 1934 Ballymena, County Antrim, Northern Ireland
- Died: 26 January 2013 (aged 78)
- Party: Communist Party of Ireland (from 1970)
- Other political affiliations: Communist Party of Northern Ireland (1955-1970)
- Spouse: Edwina Stewart (m. 1954)
- Children: 2; Helen and Moya
- Education: Stranmillis University College

James Stewart (23 November 1934 – 26 January 2013) was a communist leader from Northern Ireland.

== Biography ==
Stewart was born in Ballymena to a Protestant family, and studied at the Ballymena Academy. He was a Queen's Scout who took an interest in his Scottish heritage. He trained as a teacher at Stranmillis University College, and there met communist activist Edwina Menzies. The two married in 1954, and had two daughters. He began his teaching career at Hemsworth Square School and then taught at Somerdale School on the Shankill Road.

In 1955, Stewart joined the Communist Party of Northern Ireland. Two years later, he and Edwina attended the 6th World Festival of Youth and Students in Moscow. Also in 1957, he was named general secretary of the Party's youth section. He rapidly became a key figure in the Party, editing its newspaper Unity; completing the drafting of the Party programme, "Ireland's Path to Socialism"; and becoming Deputy General Secretary in 1964.

In 1970 the Communist Party of Northern Ireland merged into the Communist Party of Ireland (CPI). Stewart, who by this time had left teaching to become a full-time Party official, remained Deputy General Secretary after the merger. In this role, he was active in the Northern Ireland Civil Rights Association, Belfast Trades Council.

He stood in the 1973 Northern Ireland Assembly election in Belfast West, but took last place with only 123 votes. He also was at the bottom of the poll for Belfast City Council at the 1977, 1981 and 1985 local elections.

Stewart became CPI General Secretary in 1984, and served in that position until 2001 when he took the post of CPI National Chairperson.

Party political offices
Preceded by Michael O'Riordan	General Secretary of the Communist Party of Ireland; 1984–2001	Succeeded by Eugene McCartan
Preceded by Eugene McCartan	National Chairperson of the Communist Party of Ireland; 2001–2004	Succeeded by Lynda Walker
