= The Irish Workers' Voice =

Official newspaper of the CPI

- Type: Weekly political newspaper
- Publisher: Revolutionary Workers' Groups (1931–1933); Communist Party of Ireland (1933–1941); Irish Workers' League (1949–1970); Communist Party of Ireland (1970–2003)
- Founded: 1931
- Language: English, Irish
- Circulation: Unknown

The Irish Worker's Voice is an official newspaper of the Communist Party of Ireland (CPI). The paper is published weekly on and off by the various guises under which the Communist party of Ireland was constituted. The first issue was on the 4th of April 1931 initially published by the Revolutionary Workers' Groups and edited by Tom Bell, the paper was relaunched when the W. T. Cosgrave government fell in March 1932, with Brian O'Neill as editor. The paper became the publication of the Communist Party of Ireland founded in 1933. The paper was named the Irish Workers' Voice to distinguish it from Jim Larkin's The Irish Worker. The Irish Worker along with other left wing and republican newspapers were banned in Northern Ireland in 1940.

In 1941, The Irish Workers' Voice was edited by O'Neill, but the paper folded that year when the Communist Party of Ireland split and ceased to function, as the Soviet Union came into the Second World War.

In 1949 following re-establishment of the Communist party as the Irish Workers' League (IWL) the paper was relaunched.

Following the merger of the IWL and the Communist Party of Northern Ireland the paper continued as the publication of the southern party in Dublin while Unity was published by the Belfast office.

In 2003 the Communist Party of Ireland launched the Socialist Voice as a monthly publication of the party from Dublin.
