= Communist Party of Ireland (1933) =

- Abbreviation: CPI
- General Secretary: Seán Murray
- Founded: June 1933
- Dissolved: July 10, 1941
- Preceded by: Revolutionary Workers' Groups
- Merged into: Labour Party
- Succeeded by: Communist Party of Northern Ireland
- Newspaper: The Irish Workers' Voice
- Membership (1938): 200≈ members
- Ideology: Communism

The Communist Party of Ireland (CPI) was a political party founded in June 1933 in the Irish Free State. It was the second party to call itself by this name, being preceded by Socialist Party of Ireland which used the name Communist Party of Ireland briefly in the early 1920s. The party found it extremely difficult to operate in 1930s Ireland and never gained much traction. The party was involved in the failed attempt to unite the various left-wing political factions in Ireland into one force known as the Republican Congress. Following the outbreak of the Spanish Civil War, many of the CPI's members volunteered on the Republican side. Following the entry of the Soviet Union in World War II in 1941, the party was disbanded in July 1941 and its members were encouraged to join the Labour Party.

== History ==
The Communist Party of Ireland emerged from the Revolutionary Workers' Groups (RWG) in June 1933. The RWG were located at Connolly House in Dublin and their most prominent early member was James Larkin Jnr (son of James Larkin). After being outlawed under the government of W. T. Cosgrave in 1931 (as part of a wider crackdown on Peadar O'Donnell's Saor Éire and the IRA), the RWG was legalised in 1932 under Éamon de Valera's government and subsequently transformed into the Communist Party of Ireland in 1933 under general secretary Seán Murray, who had attended the Lenin School in Moscow. Murray's January 1933 draft, The Irish Case for Communism, was adopted as the CPI manifesto Ireland's Path to Freedom at its June 1933 congress. The manifesto advocated replacing Fianna Fáil and the Irish Republican Army in leading the national struggle, aiming to establish a "workers' and farmers' republic."

The Communist Party of Ireland was involved in establishing the Republican Congress in 1934, bringing communists, republicans, trade unionists and tenants' organisations together. The Communist Party had long sought alliances with left-leaning republicans, engaging with groups like Saor Éire and the IRA, though the latter banned communist membership in 1933. While they saw republicanism's leftward shift as promising, the CPI aimed to integrate republicans into the party rather than form a competing entity; the CPI asserted that only the Communist Party could lead the working class through "revolutionary Marxism".

At a September 1934 conference of the Republican Congress, COMINTERN instructed the CPI to discourage the forming of a new party. COMINTERN also instructed the CPI to advocate for a "Workers' Republic" rather than an "Irish Republic." At the meeting, CPI general secretary Seán Murray argued that achieving socialism required first ousting British imperialism (rather than the other way around), a stance backed by Nora Connolly O'Brien and others. However, the final vote favoured the broader republican goal, causing a split as O'Brien and Michael Price led a faction out. Frustrated, the COMINTERN declared the split a crisis for the CPI and appointed the Communist Party of Great Britain's Pat Devine to supervise Irish operations, curbing the CPI's brief period of independent leadership.

A strong anti-communist public backlash in Ireland occurred around the time of the Spanish Civil War due to the perception that the Popular Front cause was anti-Catholic. The already small CPI found it very difficult to organise. Nevertheless, some CPI members fought in the conflict, alongside Republican Congress members, under the XV International Brigade. The CPI provided most of the Irish volunteers on the Republican side in the 1936–39 Spanish Civil War, losing members who were killed in action.

Some Irish communists opposed Ireland being brought into the Second World War and particularly opposed conscription into the British Armed Forces being applied to Northern Ireland in the conflict. Some members were held in Curragh Camp by the government during the Emergency, including Michael O'Riordan. During the Molotov–Ribbentrop Pact (1939–41) period, the CPI condemned the war as "British imperialist" while advocating for immediate peace. In October 1940, CPI activists William McCullough and Betty Sinclair received prison sentences, later reduced on appeal, for distributing seditious material, including a republican perspective on the war in the CPI's Red Hand publication.

However, following the entry of the Soviet Union into World War II, the CPI was forced into an about-face and instructed to rally support for the war. Faced with the challenge of completely altering their talking points on war and promoting a pro-war position in neutral Ireland, the CPI voted 11–9 on 10 July 1941 "to suspend independent activity and to apply the forces of the Branch to working in the Labour and trade union organisations in order to carry forward the fight against the heavy attacks now being launched against the workers."

Afterwards, its members were instructed to join the Labour Party en masse, with Jim Larkin most notably taking the lead. In Northern Ireland, the membership formed the Protestant-dominated Communist Party of Northern Ireland.
