= International Lenin School =

Soviet communist training school

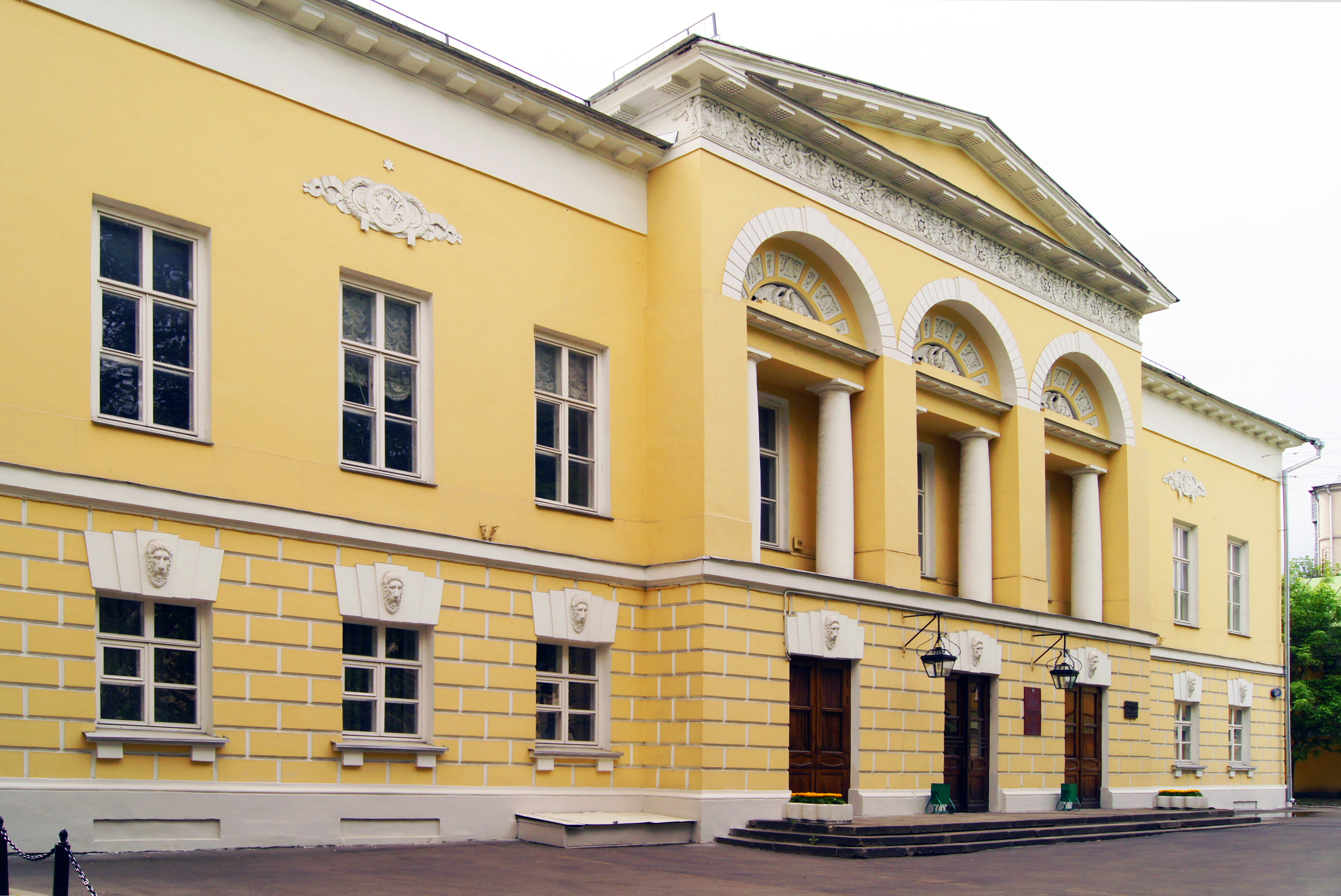
Povarskaya street

The International Lenin School (ILS) (Russian: Международная Ленинская школа (МЛШ), romanized: Mezhdunarodnaya Leninskaya shkola (MLSh)) was an official training school operated in Moscow, Soviet Union, by the Communist International from May 1926 to 1938. It was resumed after the Second World War and run by the Communist Party of the Soviet Union; it continued until the dissolution of the Soviet Union. The ILS taught both academic courses and practical underground political techniques with a focus on developing a core, disciplined and reliable communist political cadre for assignment in Communist parties around the world.

== Establishment ==
The International Lenin School (ILS) was founded in 1926 as an instrument for the "Bolshevization" of the Communist International (Comintern) and its national sections, following the resolutions of the Fifth World Congress of the Comintern. The school was established, in the formal language of the Comintern:

To assist the Comintern sections in raising the qualifications of leading Party workers whose revolutionary experience must be strengthened by general theoretical Marxist–Leninist preparation on the one hand; and, on the other, by direct and active study of the organizational and political experiences of the Russian Communist Party and of the experiences and current work of the Communist Parties in the capitalist and colonial countries."

That goal was to be achieved through an intensive one-year course of study including economics and history, Marxist theory, and the strategy and tactics employed by the world communist movement. Its teachers were leading intellectuals of the Comintern and Soviet Union. Its first director was Nikolai Bukharin. Students for the International Lenin School were hand-picked by the various communist parties.

The first class of students, which began instruction in May 1926, consisted of 70 individuals from around the world. A matter of major difficulty was the variety of languages spoken by participants, a situation that necessitated the extensive use of interpreters. Four languages were used by participants: Russian, German, English, and French.

Academic courses taught at the ILS during its first year of existence included political economy, the history of the Russian Communist Party, the history of the world labor movement, party construction, and the Russian language. Instruction was largely based upon intensive directed reading, followed by individualized discussion with lecturers. In addition, with a view to making contact with the Soviet working class, the inaugural class of ILS students were divided into groups of between three and five and were sent out to perform manual labor in the Orecho-Zuovo Textile Mill and the Colmna Locomotive and Car Works as part of their educational experience. About 8 hours per week were spent at such factory labor.

== Scope ==
Between May 1926 and its termination in mid-1938, the International Lenin School provided academic, practical, and ideological training to some 3,500 communist students from 59 countries. The great majority of the students hailed from Europe and North America, and another Comintern-affiliated training institution, the Communist University of the Toilers of the East, catered to the majority of students from colonial countries.

The greatest number of students at the ILS came from Germany (370), followed by Czechoslovakia (320), and France, Poland, Italy, the United States, and China each supplied between 200 and 225 participants. Austria provided about 180 students, with Great Britain adding another 150, and Spain and Finland supplied about 135 students each. Other countries providing more than 60 students included the Soviet Union, Romania, Bulgaria, Greece, Ireland, and Canada.

Instruction was conducted by exiled veteran communists residing in Moscow, including in particular exiles from Germany, Italy, and Hungary, as well as Russian instructors.

== Curriculum ==
According to the ILS graduate Joseph Zack Kornfeder, the ILS included courses on Economics, Philosophy, Politics, Trade Union Organization, Party Organization, Military Organization, and the Agrarian Problem. Particular attention was paid to study of the History of the All-Russian Communist Party (Bolsheviks) as well, including the policies, organizational structure, and procedures of that organization.

At the end of each school semester, students were required to write a paper on a topic chosen by them to demonstrate their mastery of the subject matter. Successful students were to be returned home to assume executive or editorial positions or were placed in the service of the Communist International in other countries.

== Alumni ==
Internationally, Lenin School students can be traced as late as the 1960s and beyond exercising significant responsibilities either as heads of communist governments, such as Yugoslavia's Josip Broz Tito, Poland's Bolesław Bierut and Władysław Gomułka and East Germany's Walter Ulbricht and Erich Honecker, or as leaders of significant oppositional parties elsewhere, such as Vietnamese Communist Leader and First President Ho Chi Minh, the general secretaries of the United States, French, Greek, Irish, and South African Communist Parties, Gus Hall, Waldeck Rochet, Nikolaos Zachariadis, Ernő Gerő, Sean Murray and Moses Kotane, respectively. Other important students of the Lenin School include such figures as Harry Haywood, James Larkin Jr, Carolina Loff, Lina Ódena, Markus Wolf and David Alfaro Siqueiros.

== School in Kushnarenkovo ==
After the closure of the ILS, the Comintern operated a cadre school, camouflaged as an agricultural school, in Kushnarenkovo from 1941 to 1943. Wolfgang Leonhard described his studies there in his book Child of the Revolution.

== Post-Comintern school ==
The ILS was re-established after the war and continued until the end of the Soviet Union. It was located at 49 Leningradsky Prospekt, Moscow, in a purpose-built complex with lecture halls, film theatres, library, shops, restaurants and residences. Also called the Institute of Social Sciences, it was a semi-clandestine institution, and many of its students went by pseudonyms, primarily for security reasons because they were members of then-illegal parties. The school was under the auspices of the International Department of the Communist Party of the Soviet Union. Graduates from that period, who later held prominent positions, include Alexander Dubček, Thabo Mbeki, John Dramani Mahama, Demetris Christofias, and Nadia Valavani. First-person accounts of the ILS have been written by John Mahama, Jim Riordan, Helena Sheehan and Kevin McMahon. After the end of the Soviet Union, its premises were given to the Gorbachev Foundation for a time but were later transferred to the Financial University.

== See also ==
- Moscow Sun Yat-sen University (KUTK)
- Communist University of the Toilers of the East (KUTV)
- Communist University of the National Minorities of the West (KUNMZ)
- Chinese-Lenin School of Vladivostok (KLSV)

== Sources ==
- Cohen, G.; Morgan, Kevin (2002). "Stalin's Sausage Machine: British Students at the International Lenin School 1926-37". Twentieth Century British History. 13 (4): 327–355. doi:10.1093/tcbh/13.4.327. ISSN 0955-2359.
- John Halstead; Barry Mc Loughlin (28 October 2009). "British and Irish Students at the International Lenin School, Moscow, 1926-37". Saothar. Irish Labour History Society. Archived from the original on 2009-10-28.
- Köstenberger, Julia (2007). "Die Internationale Lenin-Schule (1926-1938)". In Buckmiller, Michael; Meschkat, Klaus (eds.). Biographisches Handbuch zur Geschichte der Kommunistischen Internationale: Ein deutsch-russisches Forschungsprojekt [Biographical Handbook on the History of the Communist International: A German-Russian Research Project] (PDF) (in German). Berlin: Akademie Verlag. pp. 287–309. ISBN 978-3-05-008491-6.
- McIlroy, John; Campbell, Alan (1 September 2002). "The Scots at the Lenin School: an essay in collective biography". Scottish Labour History. 37: 37–51. Archived from the original on 15 December 2021.
- McIlroy, John; Campbell, Alan; McLoughlin, Barry; Halstead, John (1 September 2003). "Forging the faithful: the British at the International Lenin School". Labour History Review. 68 (1): 99–128. doi:10.3828/lhr.68.1.99. ISSN 0961-5652. Archived from the original on 26 September 2022.
- McIlroy, John (1 September 2003). "Glowyr cymru yn mosgo: welsh communists at the Lenin school between the wars". Llafur: The Journal of Welsh People's History. 8 (4): 51–76. ISSN 0306-0837.
- Campbell, Alan; McIlroy, John; McLoughlin, Barry; Halstead, John (1 September 2004). "The international Lenin school: a response to Cohen and Morgan". Twentieth Century British History. 15 (1): 51–76. doi:10.1093/tcbh/15.1.51. ISSN 0955-2359.
- Sheehan, Helena (2019). Navigating the Zeitgeist. Monthly Review Press. pp. 215–238. ISBN 978-1-58367-728-5.
- McLoughlin, Barry (2007). Left to the wolves. Irish Academic Press. ISBN 9780716529156.
