= Andy Barr (Irish politician) =

- Andy Barr

Chairman of the Communist Party of Ireland
- In office 1970–1983
- Succeeded by: Michael O'Riordan

President of the Irish Congress of Trade Unions
- In office 1975
- Preceded by: Denis Larkin
- Succeeded by: Matt Griffin

Personal details
- Born: 23 September 1913 Belfast, Ireland
- Died: 30 March 2003 (aged 89)
- Party: Communist Party of Ireland (from 1970)
- Other political affiliations: Communist Party of Northern Ireland (1942-1970)

Andy Barr (23 September 1913 – 30 March 2003) was an Irish communist and trade unionist.

== Life ==
Barr was born at Cluan Place off the Mountpottinger Road in East Belfast in 1913. Barr became a sheet metal worker, and joined the Communist Party of Northern Ireland (CPNI) in 1942. Barr became a shop steward in 1942, and by 1948 was a member of the National Union of Sheet Metal Workers and Braziers's Executive Committee. In 1949, he was sacked for organising a union meeting during working hours. The successful protests to reinstate him led to a stoppage of 10,000 workers. He stood unsuccessfully for the CPNI in Belfast Bloomfield at the 1953 Northern Ireland general election, taking only 11.8% of the votes cast.

In 1954, Barr was elected to the Northern Ireland Committee of the Irish Trades Union Congress, and in 1956 to the Executive Committee of the organisation. In 1959, he supported the formation of the Irish Congress of Trade Unions (ICTU). He became president of the Confederation of Shipbuilding and Engineering Unions in 1957, serving until 1978, and President of his own union in 1964, the same year in which he secured recognition of the ICTU by the Government of Northern Ireland. He stood again for the CPNI in Bloomfield at the 1965 Northern Ireland general election, and in the same year became party chairman. The CPNI became part of the Communist Party of Ireland in 1970, and Barr served as chair of the new organisation until 1983.

Barr was appointed to the Northern Ireland Economic Council, but resigned in 1973 in protest at the introduction of internment. In 1974, Barr was appointed President of the ICTU. He also represented the ICTU on the ETUC, of which he was the first communist member.

Barr opposed the Ulster Workers' Council strike of 1974, and worked with Jimmy Graham to organise a march to demonstrate this. General Secretary of the TUC Len Murray led the march, into the Port of Belfast, with Barr.

Party political offices
New office	Chairman of the Communist Party of Ireland; 1970–1983	Succeeded by Michael O'Riordan
Trade union offices
Preceded by Denis Larkin	President of the Irish Congress of Trade Unions; 1975	Succeeded by Matt Griffin
