= Betty Sinclair =

Northern Irish communist activist (1910–1981)

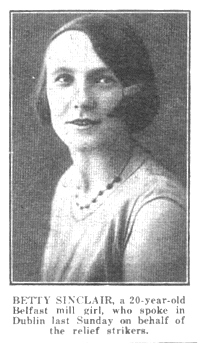
- c. 1930–31
- Born: 3 December 1910; Belfast, Ireland
- Died: 25 December 1981 (aged 71); Belfast, Northern Ireland
- Occupation: Political organiser
- Political party: Communist Party of Ireland
- Other political affiliations: Communist Party of Northern Ireland

Elizabeth Margaret Sinclair (3 December 1910 – 25 December 1981) Irish communist organiser. Active in Belfast, she was involved in the Outdoor Relief strike of 1933; had Comintern training in Moscow; sought to mediate differences in the 1940s between the Communist Party of Ireland, of which she was a lifelong member, and the Irish Republican Army; chaired the Northern Ireland Civil Rights Association in the late 1960s; and in her last years worked for the World Marxist Review in Prague.

== Early life ==
Born at 44 Hooker Street in Ardoyne, Belfast on 3 December 1910, Sinclair came from a Church of Ireland family and was the daughter of Joseph Sinclair, a sawyer, and Margaret, née Turney, both natives of Belfast. She became a millworker alongside her mother after leaving school at the age of 15. She joined the Revolutionary Workers' Groups (RWG) in 1932. In 1933, she was involved in the Outdoor Relief Strike. She then attended the International Lenin School in Moscow until 1935.

The RWG established the Communist Party of Ireland (CPI) in 1933, and Sinclair became a leading member. In 1940 she was arrested after the CPI paper Unity published an article allegedly sympathetic to the IRA, and she was sentenced to two months' imprisonment in 1941. The same year she became a full-time party worker in Belfast.

== War and post-war ==
When the all-Ireland CPI dissolved in 1941, Sinclair remained an active member of the Communist Party of Northern Ireland (CPNI) and served as its Secretary from 1942 to 1945. She stood for the group in Belfast Cromac at the 1945 Northern Ireland general election, taking almost one third of the votes. In 1947, Sinclair was appointed full-time secretary of the Belfast and District Trades Union Council.

In 1941 Sinclair was arrested and imprisoned after publishing a controversial article in the Red Hand, the official party paper of the Communist Party of Ireland. The Communist Party of Ireland and the Red Hand were worried by the IRA's willingness to explore links with Nazi Germany in order to secure support for a United Ireland, and this was expressed in the Red Hand, questioning if the IRA was turning into a pro-fascist organisation. Republicans sought a chance to respond to this, and the Red Hand allowed Jack Brady to write an article voicing their views. However, the IRA was a proscribed (banned) organisation at the time in the United Kingdom and the Republic of Ireland, and publishing their material was illegal. As part editor of the party, Sinclair was held responsible for the article and later interned, originally for a two-year prison sentence, but this was reduced to two months on appeal. She served her sentence in Armagh Jail, in conditions she described as "medieval".

Sinclair campaigned to restore the American Paul Robeson's passport. Robeson, a noted musician and activist, had supported the Allies during World War 2. However, he was denied a passport by the US State Department due to a long history of supporting left-wing politics and a pro-Soviet Union stance, as well as an anti-colonial attitude. In 1958, Sinclair personally met Robeson when he visited Belfast while on a worldwide tour.

== Final stages and death ==
Sinclair was the Trades Council's representative at the talks which founded the Northern Ireland Civil Rights Association (NICRA) in 1967, and she served as NICRA chair until 1969, when she resigned, claiming it had become dominated by ultra leftists and was worsening sectarian divisions. She stepped down from her trades council post in 1975, and moved to Prague to work for the World Marxist Review, before returning to Belfast. On Christmas Day 1981, Sinclair died from smoke inhalation caused by a fire in her flat in East Belfast.

Political offices
Preceded by Robert Morrow	Secretary of the Belfast Trades Council; 1947–1975	Succeeded by ?
