= Socialist Voice =

Communist Party of Ireland newspaper

- Socialist Voice front page from July 2012
- Type: Monthly political newspaper
- Publisher: Communist Party of Ireland
- Founded: 2003
- Political alignment: Communist; Marxist-Leninist
- Language: English, Irish
- Circulation: Unknown
- Website: socialistvoice.ie

Socialist Voice is the official newspaper of the Communist Party of Ireland (CPI). The paper is published monthly and is also available online. It provides an analysis of political events as well as including historic pieces, book and film reviews and international news. The paper followed on from previous newspapers of the Communist Party of Ireland the monthly The Irish Socialist and weekly bulletin The Irish Workers' Voice.
