= Irish Workers' Party =

- General Secretary: Michael O'Riordan
- Founded: November 8, 1948
- Dissolved: 1970
- Merged into: Communist Party of Ireland
- Newspaper: The Irish Workers' Voice; The Irish Socialist
- Ideology: Communism

The Irish Workers' League (1948–1962), later the Irish Workers' Party (1962–1970) was a communist party in the Republic of Ireland.

== Background ==
The Southern section of the Communist Party of Ireland had suspended its activities from 1941 onwards, because of police interference in its activities and the difficulties imposed by the emigration of many members to find work in England. Members were encouraged instead to join the Labour Party (although many were subsequently expelled).

The influx of communists to the Labour Party and the union movement, from both James Larkin's party and the Communist Party of Ireland, caused a split in Labour, with the formation in 1944 of the National Labour Party. During this time, the communists still ran a revolutionary book-shop called New Books and produced a publication, Irish Review.

== Irish Workers' League ==
After the Second World War, former internees from the Curragh Camp, including members of the "Connolly Group," along with individuals expelled from the Labour Party, established a party in Republic of Ireland on 8 November 1948 under the name Irish Workers' League. Michael O'Riordan became its secretary, and others involved in early meetings of the party included Dominic Behan, Sam Nolan, Joe O'Connor and Sean Mulready. The IWL resumed publication of The Irish Workers' Voice which had been a publication of the Communist Party. The IWL ran candidates unsuccessfully in the 1951, 1954, and 1961 general elections.

== Change of name to Irish Workers' Party ==
The group's name was changed to the Irish Workers' Party in 1962, but this organisation did not register itself as a political party. Thus, it did not select candidates until the 1965 general election, when it fielded some candidates unsuccessfully, and again in the general election of 1969. In December 1965 the IWP began publishing a monthly newspaper, The Irish Socialist, from its New Books bookshop.

In 1970, the Irish Workers' Party merged with the Communist Party of Northern Ireland to reconstitute the all-Ireland Communist Party of Ireland.

== General Secretary ==
- 1948–1970: Michael O'Riordan
