= Communist Party of Northern Ireland =

Political party established in Northern Ireland

- Leader: Sean Murray; William McCullough; Hugh Moore
- Chairman: Sean Murray; Andy Barr
- Founded: 1941
- Dissolved: 1970
- Preceded by: Communist Party of Ireland (1933)
- Succeeded by: Communist Party of Ireland
- Headquarters: Belfast
- Youth wing: Northern Ireland Young Communist League
- Ideology: Communism; Marxism–Leninism
- Political position: Far-left
- International affiliation: Comintern (1941-1943)

The Communist Party of Northern Ireland was a small communist party operating in Northern Ireland. The party merged with the Irish Workers' Party in 1970 to form the reunited Communist Party of Ireland.

== Formation ==
The party originated in the 1941 split in the Communist Party of Ireland (CPI), which also produced the Irish Workers' League (IWL) in the Republic of Ireland. The split was due to the difficulties of operating in the Republic, and the unpopularity of the argument that Ireland should enter World War II in the Republic, as opposed to its popularity in Northern Ireland.

In July 1941, the Communist Party of Ireland National Executive suspended independent activities and its membership were encouraged to undertake entryism and join the Irish Labour Party, and trade union movement, the Irish Labour Party was not organised in Northern Ireland and in October the Communist Party of Northern Ireland published its manifesto.

The CPNI held its first conference in October 1942, in Belfast, with many former members of the CPI from the Republic attending. By 1943, it had grown to 35 branches, although it was not able to operate openly in more strongly Catholic areas. Indeed, while the party in Belfast had a mostly Catholic membership in the 1930s, following the split, it became mostly Protestant.

== Growth and decline ==
The CPNI stood their own candidates in the 1945 Northern Ireland general election. While they did not come close to winning any seats, they polled a respectable 12,000 votes for their three candidates (Betty Sinclair, William McCullough and Sid Maitland), who retained their deposits.

The CPNI was unable to use any momentum from their election result and declined in the following decades. It stopped publishing its newsletter, Unity, in 1947, membership fell from 1,000 in 1945 to 172 in 1949, and at the 1949 Northern Ireland general election it ran only McCullough, who took just 623 votes. Nonetheless it became prominent in the trade unions, with Sinclair becoming full-time secretary of the Belfast Trades Council.

The party continued to intervene in elections, supporting Jack Beattie's Irish Labour Party candidacy at the 1950 Belfast West by-election, and standing Jimmy Graham and Eddie Menzies unsuccessfully in that year's local elections in Belfast. A Joint Council was established to co-ordinate the activities of the CPNI and the IWL, although disputes between the two sometimes arose, particularly over the priority given to opposing the partition of Ireland.

== Civil rights movement and merger ==
By the early 1960s, the CPNI was promoting the Northern Ireland Labour Party, then from 1965 tried to establish a civil rights movement with leading trade unionists and Irish republicans. It hoped to politicise the IRA; its highpoint was the civil rights association (NICRA) of the late 1960s in which Sinclair was prominent, although she was openly critical of the lack of engagement from colleagues such as Andy Barr and James Stewart. As well as Sinclair, other CPNI members involved in the NICRA were Noel Harris (Chairman) and Denis O'Brien Peters (Secretary). It ultimately became the junior partner in a merger with the Irish Workers' Party, which was once again acting as an independent organisation, which in 1970 became the Communist Party of Ireland.

The CPNI published following its creation in 1941 the newspaper The Red Hand. Its on-and-off weekly newspaper Unity, following the merger in 1970, became the weekly publication of the Belfast District of the Communist Party of Ireland. Since 2021, Unity is no longer published by the Communist Party of Ireland.

== General Secretaries ==
1941: Sean Murray - organiser from 1950-61.
1942-46: William McCullough
1963-70: Hugh Moore
