= Communist Party of Ireland =

Political party in Ireland

- Abbreviation: CPI
- Chairperson: Jimmy Doran
- General Secretary: Jimmy Corcoran
- Founded: 1970; 56 years ago
- Merger of: Irish Workers' Party; Communist Party of Northern Ireland
- Headquarters: 43 East Essex Street, Dublin 2, Ireland
- Newspaper: Socialist Voice
- Youth Wing: Connolly Youth Movement (Until 2021)
- Ideology: Communism; Marxism–Leninism; Euroscepticism
- International affiliation: IMCWP

Party flag

Website
- communistparty.ie

The Communist Party of Ireland (CPI) is a Marxist–Leninist party, founded in 1970 and active in the Republic of Ireland and Northern Ireland following a merger of the Irish Workers' Party and the Communist Party of Northern Ireland. It rarely contests elections and has never had electoral success. The party is a member of the International Meeting of Communist and Workers' Parties. Throughout the period of the Cold War, the CPI openly aligned with the Soviet Union, with the organisations that formed the CPI sharing an allegiance to the Soviet Union and looking to Moscow for the general political line, while later asserting greater independence. During the Troubles, the party procured some arms for the faction which became the Official IRA. The party closely supported the Cuban Revolution and campaigns such as the Birmingham Six. Minor splits from the CPI included the Eurocommunist-inspired Irish Marxist Society.

== History ==
=== 1970s and 1980s ===
The Communist Party of Ireland formed in 1970 following a merger of the Irish Workers' Party and the Communist Party of Northern Ireland. According to Milotte, the Irish Workers' League had become the Irish Workers' Party in 1962, before merging eight years later with the Communist Party of Northern Ireland to form the third Communist Party of Ireland. Michael O'Riordan, a member of the Communist Party of Ireland (1933), became general secretary and would remain in that role until 1983. In March 1970, following the CPNI/IWP merger, the new Communist Party of Ireland issued a manifesto called For Unity and Socialism, advocating the election of left-wing governments in both parts of Ireland, and, eventually, the creation of a United Ireland. Bob Purdie states that the Communist Party of Northern Ireland had emerged from a 1941 split in the former Communist Party of Ireland over support for the Allied war effort after Germany invaded the Soviet Union.

One notable split from the CPI was the Eurocommunist group the Irish Marxist Society, which left the CPI around 1976. The IMS was founded by Joe Deasy (1922–2013), Sam Nolan (1930-), Paddy Carmody, George Jeffares, Mick O'Reilly (1946-) and other former CPI members. The IMS advocated Marxist feminism and was also outspoken in its rejection of the two nations theory of Northern Ireland. Most of the IMS's members later joined the Irish Labour Party, where they played a leading role in the formation of Labour Left.

The CPI strongly criticised the Anglo-Irish Agreement, claiming the AIA "underlined Partition and gave Britain a direct say in the affairs of the Republic". In the 1980s, its membership declined significantly during the electoral rise of the Workers' Party and this trend continued after the dissolution of the Soviet Union. The party's aim is to win the support of the majority of the Irish people for ending the capitalist system and for building socialism. It is actively opposed to neo-liberalism and to the European Union.

Autobiographical accounts of the party in this period have been written by Mick O'Reilly, Helena Sheehan and Kevin McMahon.

=== 2010s and 2020s ===
The party stood two candidates in the 2014 local elections, neither was elected. The CPI fielded one candidate for the 2016 Dáil Éireann election for the Cork North-West constituency.

In January 2021, the Connolly Youth Movement announced that it had disaffiliated from the CPI. In February, the CPI issued a statement stating that several dual (CPI-CYM) members had been expelled for severe breaches of discipline and factional behaviour within the CPI prior to the CYM's decision to drop its support for the programme of the CPI.

On 2 June 2021, the CPI released a statement distancing itself from its former Belfast branch due to the actions of former party members in the city. The statement also announced the founding of a new Greater Belfast branch to replace the Belfast branch and noted that the branch's social media pages and Unity newspaper were still in the hands of the former members of the Belfast branch.

After Russia invaded Ukraine in February 2022, the party called for an immediate ceasefire and political solution to bring about a "demilitarised, neutral Ukraine", saying it was an "inter-imperialist war". The CPI opposes the Ukrainian Government, stating the 2014 Ukrainian Revolution was a US-backed "coup". The CPI blamed the war on "the expansion of NATO", stating it had built up "large bases of troops and mass destructive weapons along [Russia's] western and southern borders". When it was announced the Irish Defence Forces would train Ukraine's military in mine clearing, the CPI condemned this as "collaboration of the Irish political establishment in the NATO-EU strategy to escalate and prolong the war in Ukraine".

In 2022, a group seceded from the CPI, citing "political and organisational issues", with the name "Irish Communist Party". It claims to be a successor to the CPI, stating that an "opportunistic and anti-democratic faction" had taken control of the party. The interim National Chairperson is Eoin Ó Murchú.

== Organisation and activity ==
The general secretary of the party is Jimmy Corcoran. The CPI publishes a monthly magazine called Socialist Voice. The CPI says it has active branches in each province. Its 2024 accounts described the party as organised on a 32-county basis, with branches in Dublin, Cork, and two in Northern Ireland and the Border region: the Betty Sinclair Branch and the Greater Belfast Branch. The accounts also state that the Cork branch incorporates counties in Munster.

While it is a registered party, the CPI has rarely run candidates in elections and has never had electoral success. The CPI operates a bookshop in Dublin called Connolly Books, which is named after the Irish socialist James Connolly.

The party and its members are prominent in a number of campaigns such as advocating a "No" vote in the Lisbon Treaty referendums. The party has also advocated a referendum on the Irish bailout of banks. It also continues to oppose the European Union and membership of the euro currency. The CPI set up the Repudiate The Debt campaign to further this objective. In the 2010s, the CPI was active in Right2Water Ireland and called for a constitutional amendment to enshrine ownership of water in the hands of the Irish people and not the state. The party also supported the anti-war movement in Ireland as part of the Peace and Neutrality Alliance.

In November 2017, the Standards in Public Office Commission stated that some statements of accounts had been received from the CPI, but they were found not to be compliant because the accounts were not audited. It decided against appointing a public auditor as the CPI did not receive any funding from the exchequer.

== General secretaries ==
- 1970–1983: Michael O'Riordan
- 1984–2001: Jimmy Stewart
- 2002–2023: Eugene McCartan
- 2023–present: Jimmy Corcoran

== Chairpersons ==
- 1970–1983: Andy Barr
- 1983–1989: Michael O'Riordan
- 1989–2001: Eugene McCartan
- 2001–2004: Jimmy Stewart
- 2004–2017: Lynda Walker
- 2018–2021: John Pinkerton
- 2021–2022: Janelle McAteer
- 2023–2025: Ciara Ní Mhaoilfhinn
- 2026–present: Jimmy Doran
