= Revisionism (Ireland) =

Revisionism in Irish historiography refers to a historical revisionist tendency and group of historians who are critical of the orthodox view of Irish history since the achievement of partial Irish independence, which comes from the perspective of Irish nationalism. For opponents, Revisionists are regarded as apologists for the British Empire in Ireland, proponents of a form of denialism and even in some cases advocates of neo-unionism, while the Revisionists on the other hand see themselves as positing a progressive cosmopolitan narrative opposed to a "narrowly sectarian" viewpoint.

== Background ==
The revisionist school of Irish history can be said to have originated in the 1930s when it was championed by Robert Dudley Edwards, D. B. Quinn and T. W. Moody.

== Themes ==
=== Figures ===
Brendan Bradshaw, Fellow and Director of Studies in History at Queens' College, Cambridge, stated that there has been an "iconistic assault" on nationalist martyrs. Examples include Ruth Dudley Edwards' criticisms of Patrick Pearse and Tom Dunne's criticism of Wolfe Tone in his book Theobald Wolfe Tone: Colonial Outsider.

==== Patrick Pearse and the Provisional IRA ====
One trend is to link the violence of people like Patrick Pearse and the Easter rebels to the violence of the Provisional IRA by saying Pearse provided a template for the ideology of the Provisionals.

The President of Ireland, Michael D. Higgins, has criticised this calling it "loose revisionism" and "tendentious". He followed up stating in a speech in 2016 that "This was of course a somewhat simplistic and ideological assumption, and contemporary historians are more interested in the human rights breaches and the political and social basis of conflict and exclusion as a source of violence in the Northern Ireland of the 1970s".

== Historians and other writers ==
=== Revisionists ===
- Ian Adamson
- Donald Akenson
- Jonathan Bardon
- Owen Dudley Edwards
- Robert Dudley Edwards
- Ruth Dudley Edwards
- Marianne Elliott
- Richard English
- Garret FitzGerald
- R. F. Foster
- Eoghan Harris
- Peter Hart
- Liam Kennedy
- F. S. L. Lyons
- Martin Mansergh
- F. X. Martin
- Theodore William Moody
- Kevin Myers
- Conor Cruise O'Brien
- Cormac Ó Gráda
- Fintan O'Toole
- Tom Reilly
- Tom Dunne

=== Anti-revisionist ===
- Aubane Historical Society
- Tim Pat Coogan
- Anthony Coughlan
- Seamus Deane
- Desmond Fennell
- Meda Ryan

== See also ==
- Anglophilia
- Post-colonialism
- West British
