= Aubane Historical Society =

Irish historical society

The Aubane Historical Society (AHS) is a historical society of amateur historians based in Millstreet, County Cork in Ireland, focusing on local history and the Irish revolutionary period. Brendan Clifford and Jack Lane, members of both the AHS and British and Irish Communist Organisation (BICO), grew up in the Aubane area of North Cork. The AHS has published a number of pamphlets on local history matters, including several on the Home Rule politician William O'Brien, the novelist Canon Patrick Sheehan, and the local poet Ned Buckley. According to Jack Lane, the AHS was originally intended to be a local history organisation, but later expanded into the role of opposing the "revisionist" movement in Irish history. The society has been critical of Peter Hart, whom it has accused of falsifying interview material, with denunciations of Roy Foster, Brian Hanley, Paul Bew and Henry Patterson. The AHS has also attacked Hubert Butler (whom it accuses of being a quasi-racist defender of Protestant Ascendancy) and Elizabeth Bowen, whom it has described as a British spy in Ireland during the Second World War. The AHS has worked with some writers who might be seen as representing a more traditional Irish republican perspective, including Desmond Fennell, Eoin Neeson and Meda Ryan.

The AHS has also stated that the killing of two young Cooneyite Protestant farmers at Coolacrease, County Offaly in 1921 was not sectarian (it has stated they were properly executed for attacking the forces of the legitimate, democratically elected Dáil government). It has been associated with commentators and the Roger Casement Foundation who argue that the diaries ascribed to Roger Casement were forged by British Intelligence while arguing that Casement's published opposition to England and participation in the First World War was a correct position for Irish people to take.

The society has presented itself in populist terms as a group of amateurs speaking for the "plain people of Ireland" as against academic historians, whom it has presented as "elitist snobs" with "sinister political agendas".

The AHS's interpretation of Irish history has been criticised by a number of Irish academics.

== See also ==
- List of historical societies in Ireland
