= Socialist Party of Ireland (1971) =

- Founded: 1971
- Dissolved: 1982
- Split from: Official Sinn Féin
- Merged into: Democratic Socialist Party
- Newspaper: Vanguard
- Ideology: Marxist-Leninism; Eurocommunism
- Political position: Far Left

The Socialist Party of Ireland (SPI) was a minor left-wing political party which existed in Ireland from 1971 to 1982.

The SPI was set up by former members of Official Sinn Féin. It was formed on 13 December 1971 in Dublin and published its political manifesto on 19 January 1972. The SPI saw itself as a hard-line Marxist-Leninist alternative to the Communist Party of Ireland, which it criticised for its “blurred philosophy, loose structure, of discipline and unity”. The SPI opposed the friendly stance taken by the CPI towards official Sinn Féin, which it saw as a “mixture of petit-bourgeois radicals, nationalists and ultra leftists”. The SPI supported the Communist Party of the Soviet Union and the Moscow Declaration of 1969. The party also advocated Eurocommunism in the 1970s.

It staged its first national congress in Dublin on 1–2 December 1973. The congress elected a seven-member central committee consisting of Fergus Brogan, Desmond Hughes, Deirdre Uí Bhrógáin, Éamonn Ó Fearghail, Seamus Ó Reachtagáin, Fergus Quinlan, and Séamas Ó Brógáin.

In the late 1970s, the party started discussions with several other groups with a similar policy on the National Question, including the British and Irish Communist Organisation (B&ICO) and the Limerick Socialists headed by Jim Kemmy. Eventually the three groups merged forming the Democratic Socialist Party (DSP) with one elected representative in the Dáil (Parliament). The DSP eventually merged with the Irish Labour Party which became a junior partner in a coalition government.

During its life, the SPI was very active in campaigning for divorce (Divorce Action Group), contraception (Contraception Action Campaign), abortion (Right to Choose) and, in particular, opposition to nationalism and the campaign of the Provisional IRA (Socialists Against Nationalism). It supported the two nations theory which accepted the right of the Unionist population of Northern Ireland to remain part of the United Kingdom until such time as a majority of the population choose otherwise by democratic means.

The party's head office was at 23 Parliament Street, Dublin 2. In 1976, it renamed itself the "Socialist Party".

Several SPI members ran as independents in Irish elections, the most successful being Eamonn O'Brien from Ballymun, who won six percent of the vote in the Dublin County North constituency at the 1977 general election. He also joined the Workers' Party and later the Labour Party and represented Ballymun as a city councilor.

On 1 December 1982, the Socialist Party dissolved with the majority joining Jim Kemmy's Democratic Socialist Party and the others either joining the Workers' Party or B&ICO.

== Publications ==
=== Newspapers ===
- Vanguard, 1971–1974.
- Advance, 1975.

=== Books/Pamphlets ===
- Ireland into slavery: the Common Market threat, Dublin, 1972, ISBN 0-904185-00-1.
- The Socialist future. Programme of the Socialist Party of Ireland. Adopted by the 1st National Congress 1–2 December 1973, Dublin, 1974.
- Songs of the workers, Dublin, 1975.
- The two states theory, Dublin: Advance, 1978.
