= Brendan Clifford =

Irish activist

- Born: 1936 (age 89–90); Sliabh Luachra area of Munster, Ireland
- Occupations: Historian; Political Activist

Brendan Clifford (born 1936) is an Irish historian and political activist.

== Early life and education ==
He was born in the Sliabh Luachra area of Munster, Republic of Ireland.

== Career ==
As a young man, Clifford emigrated to the United Kingdom and became involved in left-wing politics. Initially, he was an associate of Michael McCreery, a leader of the Committee to Defeat Revisionism, for Communist Unity, a small British Marxist–Leninist group that had left the Communist Party of Great Britain in 1963. Later, he joined the Irish Communist Group which soon split into two factions; Clifford sided with the Maoist faction, which named itself the Irish Communist Organisation (ICO). In 1967, Clifford gave a public speech on the Republican Congress in Wynn's Hotel, Dublin, at a meeting of the Irish trade union group Scéim na gCeardchumann.

=== 1970s ===
In the early 1970s, he joined the other ICO members in advocating the two-nations theory – that the Ulster Protestants formed a separate nation and the Republic of Ireland had no right to force them into a United Ireland against their wishes. Clifford soon became a prolific publisher of material advocating the group's viewpoint. The ICO later changed its name to the British and Irish Communist Organisation (B&ICO).

He was an active campaigner against Irish nationalism alongside other B&ICO members including his wife Angela Clifford, Jack Lane, Manus O'Riordan and Len Callendar. By the late 1970s, according to historian Richard P. Davis, Clifford and historian Peter Brooke were effectively leading the B&ICO.

=== 1980s ===
In the 1980s, Clifford began campaigning for the organisation of British mainland political parties in Northern Ireland. He was an active member of the Campaign for Equal Citizenship political-advocacy group which advocated this aim. Clifford was strongly against the 1985 Anglo-Irish Agreement and wrote several pamphlets attacking the agreement and especially the Irish politician John Hume, whom Clifford regarded as a reactionary Irish Nationalist; and Queen's University Belfast, which Clifford claimed was biased against the Ulster Unionists.

As the B&ICO became inactive in the mid-1980s, he began working through several new groups, including the Aubane Historical Society, an organisation originally intended to be a local history organisation, but later expanded into the role of opposing the "revisionist" movement in Irish history; and the Ernest Bevin Society, the B&ICO's British branch. In a piece written for The Independent, Clifford argued that Northern Catholics had no interest in a United Ireland and therefore electoral integration was the answer to the Northern conflict: "Opinion polls now confirm what one knew from experience in the Sixties, that most Catholics did not want to join the Republic. That fact is, however, of no electoral consequence". Clifford also criticised the Irish Republican Army (IRA) campaign of violence as futile: "The IRA wants to revolutionise the Irish State to make it fit for Irish unity. But nothing is less likely than a revolution in the Republic, and all concerned know it".

Clifford also defended the British Monarchy, arguing it played a socially beneficial role in British society.

=== 1990s ===
Clifford opposed the Gulf War (1990–1991); he was dismayed at Irish academic Fred Halliday's support for the conflict and wrote a Bevin Society pamphlet, The New Left Imperialist, that was strongly antagonistic toward Halliday.

In the 1990s, Clifford and Lane published several books on Irish history, including Notes on Eire: Espionage Reports to Winston Churchill, 1940–2, an account of Irish writer Elizabeth Bowen's World War II intelligence reports to Britain. The book marked an abandonment of the opposition to Irish nationalism that had characterised Clifford's earlier work. This book provoked some controversy because Clifford argued the Anglo-Irish Bowen was not in any way an Irish writer.

Clifford stated Franco's rule brought political stability to Spanish society: "Spain evolved under Franco. It is doubtful in the extreme whether the Spanish Republic which he overthrew was capable of evolving".

Clifford has also argued Britain, not Germany, bears responsibility for starting World War II: "Going over the events of 1939, one can hardly suppress the thought that Britain decided to aggravate Germany over the last national issue remaining from the Versailles arrangement and make it an occasion for war, lest no further opportunity for war should present itself, and the Munich Agreement [(1938)] should prove to be a settlement".

Discussing the book The Speeches of Adolf Hitler, April 1922 – August 1939 in an essay in Notes on Eire, Clifford argues that Hitler's speeches are "coherent arguments" and claims he can see how Hitler was able to persuade the Germans to follow him.

Clifford also argues that pre-World War II British governments had no interest in stopping the Nazi persecution of the Jews and that the importance of the Holocaust in World War II has been exaggerated by modern historians: "the extermination of the Jews was an obscure incident in the hinterland of the German-Soviet War.... The Jews were not being exterminated when Britain declared war. The Jewish question does not figure in the declaration of war. The extermination did not begin until two years into the war, after Britain had succeed in spreading it to Russia. It was unimagined even by the most daring spirits in the SS in the summer of 1939".

He has also taken issue with Irish histories of the Irish Free State during the Second World War. In a critique of the book Ireland and the League of Nations 1919–1946 edited by Michael Kelly, Clifford claims the book and others reflect non-Irish viewpoints.

=== 2010s ===
Clifford has endorsed David Irving as a historian and argued the charges of Holocaust denial laid against Irving are unjust, stating Irving has not denied that "millions were killed deliberately" by the Nazi government.

== Bibliography ==
- Clifford, Brendan (1986). Parliamentary Despotism: John Hume's Aspiration. Belfast, Northern Ireland: Athol Books. OCLC 14129827.
- Clifford, Brendan (1987). Queen's: A Comment on a University and a Reply to Its Politics Professor. Athol Books. OCLC 18071899.
- Clifford, Brendan (22 March 1989). "The Political Impotence That Fuels Rebellion; Brendan Clifford on Ulster's Resentment at Electoral Exclusion". The Independent.
- Clifford, Brendan; Lane, Jack (1999). Notes on Eire: Espionage Reports to Winston Churchill, 1940–2. Aubane, Ireland: Aubane Historical Society. ISBN 978-0-9521081-9-1.
- Clifford, Brendan (2004). Traitor-Patriots in the Great War: Casement and Masaryk – with a Review of the Rise and Fall of Czechoslovakia (part of the Belfast Magazine series 23). Belfast, Northern Ireland: B. Clifford. p. 41. ISBN 978-1-874157-10-6.
- Brendan Clifford on the Russian Revolution

== See also ==
- List of Irish historians
