= Irish Political Review =

Monthly Irish history and politics magazine

- Categories: Politics
- Frequency: monthly
- Founded: 1986
- Company: Athol Books
- Country: United Kingdom
- Based in: Belfast, Northern Ireland
- Language: English
- Website: irishpoliticalreview.com

The Irish Political Review is a monthly Irish magazine dedicated to Irish politics and history. It is known for its criticisms of historians associated with the "revisionist" view of Irish history, especially Peter Hart and R. F. Foster.

== Background ==
The magazine was first published in 1986, by Athol Books, a publisher linked with the British and Irish Communist Organisation (B&ICO). The Irish Political Review was the successor to the B&ICO magazine, The Irish Communist.

== Views on Irish history and politics ==
Originally, the Irish Political Review was inimical towards Irish Republicans and supported the use of the Diplock Court system and Section 31 against Republicans. However, it moved away from this position and currently expresses support for Irish Republican parties.

In the late 1990s the Irish Political Review came to public notice when it began running articles strongly critical towards the work of Peter Hart, especially Hart's account of the Dunmanway killings. The Irish Political Review also ran a series of articles by Brendan Clifford and Jack Lane about the wartime intelligence work of writer Elizabeth Bowen, claiming this meant that the Anglo-Irish Bowen was thus not an Irish writer. These articles were later published as the Athol Books publication Notes on Eire: Espionage Reports to Winston Churchill, 1940–2 (1999). The magazine also published an article by Joe Keenan strongly hostile towards former Irish Taoiseach Garret FitzGerald, claiming that Fitzgerald's reputation for intelligence and integrity was unjustified.

The magazine has also defended the Irish government's decision in September 2008 to guarantee the Irish banks, as well as stating that Brian Cowen should have remained leader of Fianna Fail during the 2011 Irish election.

Desmond Fennell has written several pieces for the Irish Political Review.

== Views on foreign affairs ==
The Irish Political Review supported Robert Mugabe in what it called "the Zimbabwe Land War" (by analogy with the Irish Land War of the 1880s); it argues that Mugabe's opponents are manipulated by white commercial farmers (whom it compares to nineteenth-century Irish landlords) and other neo-colonial interests.

The Irish Political Review has also defended the Chinese occupation of Tibet It also backed Russia during the 2008 South Ossetia War.

The Irish Political Review published an essay defending General Toshio Tamogami's controversial article on WWII, claiming Japan ran a "very moderate" regime in Korea and Manchuria and was tricked into war by the Franklin D. Roosevelt Administration.

Malachi Lawless, the chair of the Irish Political Review group, and Eileen Courtney, the magazine's editor, were among those signing an Irish petition protesting against the Israeli government's handling of the Gaza War (2008–09).

At one point in time, the Irish Political Review's editorials proclaimed support for Declan Ganley's campaign against a second Lisbon Treaty and Libertas' plan to run for European Parliament elections.

However, in 2012 IPR contributor Jack Lane argued that Ireland needed to vote in favour of the European Fiscal Compact, stating that a "Yes" vote would help the EU to function without British involvement.

The Irish Political Review expressed support for Donald Trump in the 2016 United States presidential election, arguing that Trump's business background would make him a good administrator, and that his criticisms of NATO would encourage European autonomy. The magazine also criticised British politician Angela Rayner for taking issue with Trump's comments about women in the Access Hollywood recording.
