= Baroness Chapman =

Baroness Chapman may refer to:

- Nicky Chapman, Baroness Chapman (1961–2009), British disability rights activist
- Jenny Chapman, Baroness Chapman of Darlington (born 1973), British Labour Party politician
