= F. X. Martin =

Irish Augustinian friar, historian, writer and archivist

Francis Xavier Martin, OSA (Irish: Proinsias Xavier Ó Máirtín; 2 October 1922 – 13 February 2000) was an Irish cleric, historian and activist.

== Life ==
Francis Xavier Martin was born 2 October 1922 in Ballylongford, County Kerry, Ireland. Francis was the youngest son in a family of five boys and five girls born to Conor and Katherine Fitzmaurice Martin. His father was a physician. All but one of his brothers also became priests: Conor became professor of ethics and politics at University College Dublin, and his brother Malachi was for a while a Jesuit and became a controversial writer.

Martin was raised in Dublin, and attended the local national school before attending Holy Faith Secondary School, Clontarf and then went to Belvedere College, in Dublin. In 1941, he became an Augustinian friar. He received a B.A. from University College Dublin in 1949. He was ordained a priest in 1952. Martin, on the recommendation of T. Desmond Williams, then pursued a doctorate at Peterhouse, Cambridge, where he was the first Catholic priest admitted since the Reformation. In 1959, after being awarded his doctorate by Cambridge University, he became assistant in history at University College Dublin and in 1961 Professor of Medieval History. In 1963 he was appointed head of the Department of Medieval History.

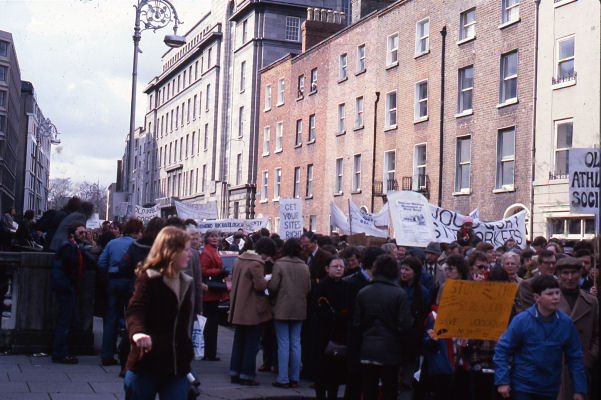
Wood Quay demonstration, September 1978

He was chairman of the Friends of Medieval Dublin, 1976–83, and of the Dublin Historic Settlement Group, and was noted as a leading member of a well-publicized struggle, during the late 1970s and early 1980s, to save the historic Wood Quay archaeological site in Dublin. While Martin could not prevent the construction of a civic office building, in 1978, part of the site was declared a national monument. Martin, a keen horseman, earned from his colleagues the nickname "The Beggar on Horseback", from his evading a fine by citing that he was a mendicant.

He was also chairman of the Council of Trustees of the National Library of Ireland from 1977 to 1981.

Martin was the author of landmark books on the history of Ireland and of his own Augustinian order.

He died at the house of the Augustinians near Rathfarnham, County Dublin, on 13 February 2000, and was buried in Glasnevin Cemetery. According to UN High Commissioner for Human Rights, Mrs Mary Robinson, "The passion with which F.X. strove to save Wood Quay, whether as a litigant, as leader of huge public demonstrations, or as occupier of the site itself, was a passion for a Dublin which understood and treasured its past. He combined this passion with a great sense of fun and love of life."

Martin's papers are preserved in the archives of the National Library of Ireland and the National Museum of Ireland.

== Selected bibliography ==
- 1948: "The writings of Eoin Mac Neill", Irish Historical Studies, No. 21, pp. 44–62.
- 1950: Sanguinea Eremus Martyrum Hiberniae Ord. Eremit S.P. Augustini (1655), edition, Archivium Hibernicum, 15, pp. 74–91.
- 1950: "John Baptist Rosseter, osa: Family background and pre-American years", The Past, # 6, 26–44.
- 1955: "Archives of the Irish Augustinians in Rome: A summary report", Archivium Hibernicum, #18, 157–63.
- 1956: Irish material in the Augustinian Archives, Rome, 1354–1624, eds. A. de Meijer and F.X. Martin, Archivium Hibernicum, xix (19), pp. 61–134.
- 1960: "An Irish Capuchin missionary in politics: Francis Nugent negotiates with James I, 1623–4", Bulletin of the Irish Committee of Historical Studies, No. 90, pp. 1–3.
- 1963: The Irish Volunteers 1913–1915: Recollections and Documents, F.X. Martin (ed.); foreword by Eamon de Valera. Dublin 1963.
- 1967: The Course of Irish History, T. W. Moody and F.X. Martin (eds.), Cork and New York.
- 1967: Giles of Viterbo, New Catholic Encyclopedia, No. 6, Washington D.C.
- 1967: Gerald of Wales, Norman Reporter in Ireland, Studies, lviii, pp. 279–92.
- 1971: "Jean Waldeby [c.1312-c.1372; Ecrivain, theologien, predicateur]" in Dictionnaire de Spiritualité, 8.
- 1973: The Scholar Revolutionary: Eoin MacNeill, 1867–1945 and the making of the New Ireland, F. X. Martin, and Francis John Byrne, (eds), Irish University Press.
- 1975: "Obstinate Skerrett, Missionary in Virginia, the West Indies and England, (c. 1674–c. 1688)", Journal of the Galway Archaeological and Historical Society, volume 35, 1975 (see John Skerrett (Augustinian).
- 1976: A New History of Ireland: Early Modern Ireland 1534–1691: volume III, (eds.)
- 1978: No Hero in the House: Diarmaid Mac Murchada and the Coming of the Normans to Ireland, O Donnell Lecture, xix, National University of Ireland.
- 1978: Expugnatio Hibernica: The Conquest of Ireland, by Giraldus Cambrensis, A. B. Scott and F. X. Martin, eds, Royal Irish Academy, Dublin.
- 1979: "The Wood Quay Saga. Part 1: November 1977 – January 1979: Bulldozers and a National Monument", in The Belevederian, Dublin, pp. 215–33.
- 1981: "Dublin Universität 1312–1981", Theologische Realenzyklopädie, No. 9, Berlin and New York, pp. 202–04.
- 1982: A New History of Ireland, volume eight, Oxford (editor).
- 1984: A New History of Ireland, volume nine, Oxford (editor).
- 1985: The Rosseters of Rathmacknee Castle, Co. Wexford, 1169–1881, Dublin, Good Counsel Press.
- 1986: A New History of Ireland, volume four (editor).
- 1987: A New History of Ireland, volume two (editor).
- 1988: A New History of Ireland, volume five (editor).
- 1988: "Murder in a Medieval Monastery" in Keimelia: Studies in Medieval Archaeology and History in memory of Tom Delaney. Galway University Press.
