= Communist Organisation in the British Isles =

Political party

Communist Organization in the British Isles
- Founded: 1 January 1974
- Dissolved: 1980
- Split from: British and Irish Communist Organization
- Newspaper: Proletarian (C.O.B.I.)
- Ideology: Marxism-Leninism; De Leonism
- Political position: Far-left

The Communist Organisation in the British Isles (COBI) was a Marxist-Leninist political party in Britain and Ireland. It was founded in 1974 by members of the British and Irish Communist Organisation (BICO) who disagreed with BICO's stance on workers' control, which the COBI described as reducing "the working class to a plastic object of bourgeois history" and "fundamentally anti-Marxist". The COBI, however, retained several of BICO's policies, including supporting the partition of Ireland, backing the UK joining the European Economic Community, and opposition to Trotskyism.

== Politics ==
The new group had already begun studying the work of the De Leonist Socialist Labour Party, also taking its arm-and-hammer logo as its own. It rapidly published a series of publications all bearing the name of their journal Proletarian, of which at least four issues were published, variously described as texts, broadsides or simply as pamphlets. COBI stated that it would use the work of "Marx, Engels, Lenin, Stalin and Mao as bases" and also defended the idea of the vanguard party as the means for achieving socialism.

It was known for its strict entry conditions, which included knowledge of at least one language other than English, and a commitment from members to "maintain himself/herself in a state of mental and physical fitness and preparedness". Members were also required to develop theoretical work to a standard satisfactory to the organisation as described in the group's Platform, published in September 1976.

== History ==
In 1977, the party was officially renamed Communist Formation. Always small it disbanded a few years later, some of its last remnants joining the Socialist Unity coalition.

Notable members included the Scottish computer scientist Paul Cockshott and the Welsh historian Gwyn A. Williams.

== Bibliography ==
- Peter Barberis, John McHugh and Mike Tyldesley, Encyclopedia of British and Irish Political Organizations
- David Widgery, The Left in Britain (1976)
