= Bill Warren (communist) =

Bill Warren (1935–1978) was a British Communist, originally a member of the Communist Party of Great Britain and later a contributor to New Left Review. In his last years he was a member of the British and Irish Communist Organisation.

He is best remembered as the author of Imperialism: Pioneer of Capitalism. This unconventional Marxist analysis was published posthumously in 1980 and is still being debated. He rejected the argument of Lenin's Imperialism, the Highest Stage of Capitalism, that capitalist development outside of Europe had ceased to be possible. He considered that he was restoring the original view of Marx and Engels, particularly in regard to the results of Britain's rule in India: namely that imperialism plays a progressive role in fostering the spread of capitalism worldwide, which is a prerequisite for socialism.

Some commentators have likened Warren's ideas on capitalism, particularly his belief that the creation of a global market is required for the creation of a Communist society, to other thinkers, such as the Revolutionary Communist Party and Nigel Harris.

== Selected publications ==
- Warren, Bill (1980). Sender, John (ed.). Imperialism, Pioneer of Capitalism. Verso.
