= Marianne Elliott (historian) =

Irish historian

Marianne Elliott OBE FRHistS FBA
- Born: 25 May 1948 (age 78); Raholp, County Down, Northern Ireland
- Spouse: Trevor Elliott (died 2013)

Academic background
- Education: Queen's University Belfast; Lady Margaret Hall, Oxford
- Thesis: The United Irishmen and France, 1793–1806 (1975)

Academic work
- Discipline: History
- Sub-discipline: Irish history
- School or tradition: Irish revisionism
- Institutions: West London Institute of Higher Education; University College of Swansea; University of Liverpool; Victoria University of Manchester; Birkbeck College, London

Marianne Elliott OBE FRHistS FBA (born 1948) is an Irish historian who was appointed OBE in the 2000 Birthday Honours.

== Career ==
Elliott was born on 25 May 1948 in Raholp, County Down, Northern Ireland, brought up in Belfast, and educated at Dominican College, Fortwilliam, Queen's University Belfast, and Lady Margaret Hall, Oxford.

She lectured in History at West London Institute of Higher Education 1975 to 1977, and was a Research Fellow at University College, Swansea, from 1977 to 1982. After short spells at Iowa State University and the University of South Carolina, she was a research fellow at the University of Liverpool from 1984 to 1987, and Simon Fellow at the University of Manchester from 1988 to 1989. She was a lecturer at Birkbeck, University of London, from 1991 to 1993, when she became the Andrew Geddes and John Rankin Professor of Modern History at the University of Liverpool. She was, until her retirement from the post, also the Director of the Institute of Irish Studies at the university.

She has written extensively on Irish history, receiving many awards for her work. Particularly notable publications include her biography of Wolfe Tone (1989), and more recently Catholics of Ulster: A History (2000) and a biography of Robert Emmet (2003). Her research interests are political and cultural history, religious identities, eighteenth-century Ireland and France and the history of Ulster.

In 2005, she delivered the Ford Lectures at Oxford University on "Religion and Identity in Irish History", which were published as When God Took Sides. Religion and Identity in Ireland : Unfinished History in 2009.

== Other activities ==
In addition to her academic career, Elliott has played an important part in the promotion of peace efforts in Northern Ireland, notably serving on the Opsahl Commission in 1993 and co-writing its report, "A Citizens' Inquiry".

She was married to the geologist Trevor Elliott until his death in 2013.

== Books ==
- Partners in revolution : the United Irishmen and France. New Haven : Yale University Press. 1982
- Wolfe Tone : prophet of Irish independence. New Haven : Yale University Press. 1989
- The Catholics of Ulster: a history. London : Allen Lane The Penguin Press. 2000.
- Editor The long road to peace in Northern Ireland : peace lectures from the Institute of Irish Studies at Liverpool University. Liverpool : Liverpool University Press. 2001
- Robert Emmet : the making of a legend. London : Profile. 2003
- When God Took Sides. Religion and Identity in Ireland : Unfinished History. Oxford : Oxford University Press. 2009
- Hearthlands: A memoir of the White City housing estate in Belfast Blackstaff Press 2017
- Fixers: Women and Housing Corruption in 1950s Belfast Oxford University Press 2026

== Honours and awards ==
In 1983 Elliott received the Leo Gershoy Award of the American Historical Association.

In October 2000 she was awarded an OBE for services to Irish Studies and the Northern Ireland peace process.

In 2002 she was elected a Fellow of the British Academy.

In 2017, Trinity College Dublin awarded her with an honorary doctorate. In the same year, she became a member of the Royal Irish Academy.

In April 2018 she was awarded a special prize by the Christopher Ewart-Biggs Memorial Prize judges "for advancing understanding of Irish history in Britain".

Academic offices
Preceded by John Maddicott	Ford Lecturer; 2004–2005	Succeeded by John Morrill
Awards
Preceded by Richard S. Westfall	Leo Gershoy Award; 1983	Succeeded by John Elliott
