= House of Lords Appointments Commission =

Independent advisory non-departmental public body

Agency overview
- Formed: May 2000
- Jurisdiction: United Kingdom
- Headquarters: 1 Horse Guards Road, London, United Kingdom
- Agency executive: Baroness Deech, Chair
- Parent department: Cabinet Office
- Key document: House of Lords Appointments Commission terms of reference
- Website: lordsappointments.independent.gov.uk

The House of Lords Appointments Commission (HOLAC) is an independent advisory non-departmental public body in the United Kingdom with oversight of some aspects of the Peerage of the United Kingdom. It has two roles: to recommend at least two people a year for appointment as non-party-political life peers who sit on the crossbenches; and to vet for propriety most other nominations for membership of the House of Lords, including those nominated by the UK political parties, nominations put forward by the Prime Minister for ministerial appointment in the House of Lords, for public service, and nominations in the honours lists (including resignation and dissolution honours lists).

The commission does not vet for propriety the appointments of Lords Spiritual (Church of England bishops) or the excepted hereditary peers who sat in the House of Lords by virtue of the House of Lords Act 1999 till the House of Lords (Hereditary Peers) Act 2026 came into effect in April 2026.

The commission was established in May 2000 to assist the transitional arrangements for reform of the House of Lords. The role of the prime minister in making non-partisan recommendations to the monarch for creation of life peerages was partially transferred to the commission, in order to ensure greater transparency in the process. It was also given oversight of all other appointments to the Lords, including partisan nominations.

== Chairs ==
Commission chairs include those listed below.

Name	Start	End	Party
The Lord Stevenson of Coddenham	May 2000	2008	Crossbench
The Lord Jay of Ewelme	23 July 2008	19 July 2013	Crossbench
The Lord Kakkar	1 October 2013	25 October 2018	Crossbench
The Lord Bew	25 October 2018	26 October 2023	Crossbench
The Baroness Deech	26 October 2023	present	Crossbench

== Members ==
The Commission has non-partisan members as well as representatives from the House of Lords of the three largest political parties:

- Chair: Baroness Deech (Chair since November 2023)
- Non-party political members:
  - Sir Hugh Robertson (member since December 2023)
  - Wayne Reynolds (member since December 2023)
  - Prof. Adeeba Malik (member since September 2025)
- Members nominated by the three major parties:
  - Conservatives: Baroness Noakes
  - Labour: Baroness Taylor of Bolton (member since September 2022)
  - Liberal Democrats: Lord Sharkey

== "People's peers" ==
The Commission makes recommendations for the appointment of non-partisan life peers. It has established for itself seven criteria upon which to base its decisions, seeking to recommend people with

- a record of significant achievement within their chosen way of life;
- the ability to make an effective and significant contribution to the work of the House of Lords;
- the time available to ensure they can make a contribution;
- some understanding of the constitutional framework, including the place of the House of Lords;
- integrity and independence;
- a commitment to the highest standards of public life; and
- independence from any political party.

The Commission has made recommendations for appointment on 16 occasions since its establishment in 2000, with a total of 67 people being recommended for peerages. All of these individuals went on to be nominated as and created life peers. Upon taking their seats, every one of them joined the crossbenches.

The fact that the type of people considered by the Commission for peers were to be neither aristocratic nor members of the "political class" led some in the British media to describe those it was to appoint as "people's peers". This term has never been a formal classification.

The purpose of the reform was to make the process more open and those making appointments more accountable. Upon the establishment of the Commission, the Prime Minister Tony Blair said it would ensure a House of Lords that was "more representative of our diverse society"; suitable candidates would be sought "in a wider field than up to now".

Following the first set of appointments in April 2001, it was, however, pointed out that those chosen included several knights as well as leading academics and scientists, having much the same establishment background that would have been made peers anyway. The Labour MP Diane Abbott described them as "the metropolitan elite".

== Appointments ==
The people recommended for appointment as life peers by the Commission since its establishment are listed below, by date of recommendation.

=== 26 April 2001 ===
- Victor Adebowale
- Richard Best
- Amir Bhatia
- Sir John Browne
- Michael Chan
- Sir Paul Condon
- Ilora Finlay
- Susan Greenfield
- Sir David Hannay
- Valerie Howarth
- Lady Howe of Aberavon
- Sir Robert May
- Sir Claus Moser
- Sir Herman Ouseley
- Sir Stewart Sutherland

=== 1 May 2004 ===
- Sir Alec Broers
- Nicola Chapman
- Sir Ewen Cameron
- Frances D'Souza
- Elaine Murphy
- Lola Young
- Diljit Rana

=== 22 March 2005 ===
- Dame Rennie Fritchie
- General Sir David Ramsbotham

=== 22 July 2005 ===
- Dame Ruth Deech
- Michael Hastings
- Sir Martin Rees
- Adair Turner
- Jo Valentine

=== 3 May 2006 ===
- Colin Low
- Sir David Rowe-Beddoe
- Dame Elizabeth Butler-Sloss
- Sir Geoffrey Dear
- Kamlesh Patel
- Karan Bilimoria
- Molly Meacher

=== 15 February 2007 ===
- Paul Bew
- Dame Jane Campbell
- Jean Coussins
- Khalid Hameed
- Sir John Krebs
- Andrew Mawson

=== 18 October 2007 ===
- Haleh Afshar
- Sir Nicholas Stern

=== 18 April 2008 ===
- Dame Eliza Manningham-Buller
- Sir John Mogg
- Sir Robert Smith

=== 29 September 2008 ===
- Susan Campbell
- David Pannick

=== 13 July 2009 ===
- Rabbi Sir Jonathan Sacks
- Dame Nuala O'Loan

=== 5 February 2010 ===
- Sir Michael Bichard
- Dame Tanni Grey-Thompson
- Tony Hall
- Ajay Kakkar

=== 5 October 2010 ===
- Peter Hennessy
- Sheila Hollins

=== 5 September 2011 ===
- Indarjit Singh
- Sir Donald Curry

=== 17 May 2012 ===
- Beeban Kidron
- Alexander Trees

=== 27 February 2013 ===
- Martha Lane Fox
- Michael Berkeley

=== 13 October 2015 ===
- John Bird
- Dame Julia King
- Robert Mair
- Mary Watkins

=== 8 June 2018 ===
- Sir David Anderson
- Rosie Boycott
- Deborah Bull

=== 24 February 2021 ===
- Dame Sue Black
- Sir Amyas Morse

=== 17 May 2022 ===
- Shaista Gohir
- Katherine Willis

=== 7 May 2024 ===
- Alexandra Freeman
- Lionel Tarassenko

=== 22 October 2025 ===
- Dame Clare Gerada
- Polly Neate

== Objections to prime ministers' nominations ==
In March 2006, the Commission objected to several men proposed for working peerages by Prime Minister Tony Blair, who had loaned large amounts of money to Blair's Labour Party. This led to the "Cash-for-Honours scandal".

In 2020, the Commission objected to the nomination of Peter Cruddas for a peerage by Prime Minister Boris Johnson. Cruddas had donated over £1,000,000 to Johnson's Conservative Party. Johnson nonetheless decided that the appointment should proceed, becoming the first ever prime minister to overrule an advice of the Commission.

It was reported in 2023 that eight nominations for life peerages in Boris Johnson's resignation honours were blocked by the commission.

== See also ==
- Lords Reform
