= Irish Revolutionary Forces =

Irish republican paramilitary organisation

- Leaders: Jim Lane, Sean Daly, Brendan O’Neill, Gerry Higgins
- Dates active: 1963–1969
- Split from: Irish Republican Army
- Headquarters: Cork, County Cork
- Active regions: Republic of Ireland
- Ideology: Irish republicanism; Marxism–Leninism–Maoism
- Wars: The Troubles

Irish Revolutionary Forces (IRF) was a short-lived Irish republican paramilitary organisation in Cork in the 1960s.

In 1963 Irish president Éamon de Valera had been scheduled to unveil a memorial at Cork city's republican plot in St. Finbarr's Cemetery on St Patrick's Day. Local members of the Irish Republican Army were angered because John Joe Kavanaugh (an IRA member killed by Gardaí in 1940) was also buried there. They demanded that militant action be taken but were refused permission by the IRA's leadership. The night before the planned ceremony two veterans of the IRA's Border Campaign, Desmond Swanton and Gerry Madden, were killed and seriously injured in a botched attempt to blow up the memorial. The IRA denied responsibility for the attack but acknowledged the two men had been members of the organisation. The IRA's local leadership also denied Swanton a full IRA funeral and expelled several of Swanton's allies from the organisation. The dismissed members distributed leaflets declaring they were forming a new group; senior IRA figure Seán Mac Stíofáin responded by raiding the new organisation's premises. In turn, the dissidents intercepted copies of the IRA's newspaper intended for sale in the Cork and put on an armed show of strength at the newspaper's offices in the city. Cathal Goulding tried to broker a compromise but negotiations fell apart and tension grew between the two factions.

Within a year the new Republican group was calling itself the Irish Revolutionary Forces and publishing a journal named An Phoblacht. Ideologically the IRF espoused Marxist-Leninism of "the Chinese variety" but interpreted to the Irish situation and was opposed to entryists within the IRA and revisionism. The IRF throughout the 1960s involved itself in social agitation, including protests against the Vietnam War. The organisation Saor Éire (Free Ireland) and its publication People's Voice were launched November 1968 by the IRF. When The Troubles broke out in Derry in August 1969, Saor Éire already had members present. The IRF/Saor Éire sent trained men and arms to Derry in response to defend Catholic areas of the city. However, Saor Éire as popularly known were actually a separate organisation based in Dublin formed from other dissident Republicans who had discussed merging with the IRF previously and by now were gaining notoriety for involvement in bank robberies. By the end of 1969 of the IRF had been wound up, with the leadership deciding the group had lost credibility. Saor Éire was eclipsed by the newly emerging Provisional IRA offering a more promising militant organisation.
