= Theodore William Moody =

Northern Irish historian (1907–1984)

Theodore William Moody (26 November 1907 – 11 February 1984) was a historian from Belfast, Ireland.

== Background ==
=== Early life ===
Moody was born in Belfast, to a poor family who made their living from dressmaking and iron turning and was educated from 1920 to 1926 at the Belfast Academical Institution. Moody's parents both belonged to the Plymouth Brethren. As a six-year-old in 1913, Moody saw the homes of Roman Catholics living down the street go up in flames during a riot against the Home Rule bill, which left him with a lifelong horror of the sectarian hatreds that so often characterised Irish life. At the Royal Belfast Academical Institution, Moody's strongest subjects were the sciences and Latin, but one of his teachers, Archie Douglas turned his attention to history. At the Queen's University Belfast, a professor James Eadie Todd encouraged Moody to pursue graduate studies. In 1930 he went to the Institute of Historical Research in London, and graduated with a PhD in 1934. Moody's doctoral thesis was published as the 1934 book The Londonderry Plantation, 1609–41: the City of London and the Plantation of Ulster. In 1922, the Irish Public Record Office in Dublin was burned down during the course of the Irish Civil War, and as historians have traditionally used government documents, much of Ireland's 17th-century history was considered lost. Moody used instead the records of The Honourable The Irish Society as the consortium of companies that granted the right to colonise Ulster in the Derry area together with the papers relating to the plantation of Ulster that were to found the records of the Irish Society. The book was generally ignored in England, but was greeted with welcome reviews in Ireland, as a trail-brazing work that opened up new avenues for studying Irish history.

During his time in London, Moody met his future wife Margaret Robertson and often spoke on the subject of Irish history with R. Dudley Edwards, with whom he lodged. and with whom he worked washing dishes in one of the London hotels to fund their studying. Both Edwards and Moody agreed that the discipline of history in Ireland needed a “revolution” in terms of methodology, goals and style. In 1932, Moody returned to Queen's University to work as a teacher's assistant to Todd, and in 1935 Moody started to deliver lectures himself. In the 1930s he

...resolved to initiate a 'scientific' historiographical revolution that would give historians the power to dissolve the popular myths that kept the different communities of Ireland divided.

Feeling historians in Ireland worked too much in isolation, Moody founded in February 1936 the Ulster Society for Irish Historical Studies, and later that same year, Edwards founded the Irish Historical Society. A man with an intense work ethic and much energy, Moody wanted to bring up the standard of history in Ireland, which he felt needed improvements. Moody was sympathetic towards Irish nationalism, but he detested violence. In his obituary, Father F.X Martin noted that Moody was raised in the Plymouth Brethren, but he found his true faith as an adult when he became a Quaker. Moody felt Ireland was in need of major social reforms, hence his personal heroes were James Connolly, James Larkin, and above all Michael Davitt, who preached a mixture of Irish nationalism, social reformism and non-violence. Despite the border between Northern Ireland and the Irish Free State, Edwards and Moody worked together and in 1938 founded the Irish Committee of Historical Studies to ensure that Ireland was a member of the Comité International des Sciences Historiques. Later in 1938, Moody and Edwards founded the journal Irish Historical Studies, to promote the study of Irish history in a properly peer-reviewed journal. In June 1939, Moody accepted an offer to teach at Trinity College, the most prestigious university in Ireland.

He held the position of Erasmus Smith's Professor of Modern History at Trinity College Dublin from 1940 to 1977, when he became professor emeritus. In 1940, Moody defined his goals to:

“teach history in various fields, including the history of Ireland to undergraduates; to encourage and direct research on Irish history, especially by young history graduates; to set new standards of objectivity and technical excellence in the conduct of the research and in the presentation of its results; to promote and assist the publication of articles and books based on such work, and thus to bring a new historiography to bear on the teaching of Irish history; to encourage co-operation among historians and communications between the historians and the concerned public; and to contribute directly to the new historiography”.

In 1943, Moody was promoted to the head of the history department. Moody was a popular teacher with enrolments in the history department rising steadily and Trinity acquiring a worldwide reputation as a centre of research on medieval and modern Irish history. Together with Edwards who now at University College in Dublin and David Quinn at Liverpool University, Moody persuaded the publisher Faber and Faber to launch a series called “Studies in Irish History” to allow his graduate students a chance to be published. With Robert Dudley Edwards, he founded Irish Historical Studies and The Irish Committee of Historical Sciences and began publication of A New History of Ireland. Moody also sought to give history a higher profile in Ireland.

=== 1950s-1970s ===
In 1953, Moody created the Thomas Davis Lectures on Irish radio, a series of half-hour lectures on various topics in Irish history. In 1954 he gave a 12-part radio lecture series on Northern Ireland Radio which proved to be so popular that Moody published them as the book Ulster Since 1800: a Political and Economic Survey. In 1957, Moody gave a second series of lectures on Northern Ireland Radio, which again published as Ulster Since 1800, Second Series: a Social Survey. In 1967, Moody hosted the 21-part television series The Course of Irish History that was aired on the Raidió Teilifís Éireann (RTE), where he aimed "to present a survey of Irish history that would be both popular and authoritative, concise but comprehensive, highly selective while at the same time balanced and fair-minded, critical, but constructive and sympathetic". Moody served on the Irish Manuscripts Commission (1943–1984), the Irish Broadcasting Council (1953–1960), the advisory committee for cultural relations to the Irish government (1949–1963), the commission on higher education (1960–1962) and the Irish Broadcasting Authority (1960–1972).

In 1962, Moody in a presidential speech before the Irish Historical Society called for a “New History of Ireland” that would take the form of a 12–14 volume work that would cover all aspects of the political, economic, cultural, social, legal, religious and military history of Ireland that would require the collaboration of dozens of scholars with financial support from the Irish state. In October 1963, Moody secured the necessary funding for “Moody’s history” as the project was popularly dubbed. However, Moody was forced to modify his plans for The New History of Ireland with the first stage to consist of two volumes giving a general overview of Irish history with the remaining ten volumes to consist of “primary narrative” and “complementary structure” with specialised chapters on subjects such as the history of the law, music, literature and art in Ireland.

In 1972, the Irish government fired the entire council of the Irish Broadcasting Authority for supposedly violating a directive to not air “any matter that could be calculated to promote the aims or activities of any organisation which engages in, promote, encourages or advocates the attaining of any particular objective by violent means.” Moody was broadly supportive of the directive, but felt it had been applied in a heavy-handed manner that was constricting the supply of information. At the time of his firing, Moody told the Irish Times on 27 November 1972:

“Much of our problems springs from a refusal to face unpalatable facts, an addiction to make believe, a tendency to prefer myths to the truth. But a new realism, a new questioning of case-hardened assumptions has emerged, and this has been greatly, perhaps decisively, encouraged and stimulated by the development of broadcasting. If the measure of freedom that the RTE has had is now to be drastically reduced, one of the first casualties will be the truth, and the process of awakening the public mind to the realities of the Irish predicament may be disastrously halted. We need more, not less, communication in Ireland.”

In 1976, the first volume of The New History of Ireland dealing with Irish history from 1543 to 1691 was published under the editorship of Moody, Father F. X. Martin and Francis John Byrne. The project had been marred by major delays, but the critical reception to The New History of Ireland was very favourable. In 1974, Moody published The Ulster Question, 1603–1973 detailing with the troubled relationship between the Catholic community who tended to be Irish nationalists and the Protestant community who tended to be Unionists in Ulster. As someone from Northern Ireland living in the Irish Republic, Moody was greatly concerned with and saddened by “the troubles” that broke out in Northern Ireland in 1968 as the state of low-level warfare was popularly known, and in his preface written in January 1974, Moody expressed the hope that the power-sharing deal reached in the Sunningdale Agreement would end "the troubles". By the time the book was published later that year, the Sunningdale Agreement had already collapsed. In the 1970s, Moody started researching the life of Michael Davitt, who founded the Irish Land League and published a biography Davitt and the Irish Revolution, 1846–82 in 1981.

In a 1977 speech Irish History and Irish Mythology, Moody called for historians to end the promoting of what Moody called the “myths”, or “received views” which mix “fact and fiction”, which Moody argued was causing the violence in Northern Ireland. Moody labelled as “myths” the popular views about the establishment of the Anglican Church of Ireland, the view that Catholicism was the driving force behind the resistance to the Elizabethan conquest of Ireland, the 1641 uprising against the English Crown, the idea of “true” Irishmen as a Catholic “race”, the Great Famine of Ireland of 1845–50, the “land war” of 1879–82, and what Moody called the most pernicious “myth” of them all, the idea of Irish history as one of a continuous struggle for freedom from Great Britain. Moody argued this “myth” of Irish history that depicted in Manichean terms the entirety of Irish history from 1169 to the present as a struggle between the morally pure Irish vs. the utterly evil British was being used by the Provisional Irish Republican Army as the main reason for its struggle in Northern Ireland, and ruled out any possibility of a compromise solution to "the troubles" of Northern Ireland.

Moody argued that many Irish historians distort the struggle against Queen Elizabeth I's efforts for the conquest and colonisation of Ireland by treating the resistance as entirely Gaelic-speaking and Catholic, which ignored the role of the "Old English" community in Ireland, who were also Catholic, spoke English, and were willing to be loyal to the Crown provided the Crown respected their traditional privileges in Ireland, which it was not under Elizabeth. Moody attacked the "Anglican" myth of Irish history that the Church of Ireland was the "true" church, a continuation of the church founded by Saint Patrick, which argued created a smug sense of Protestant superiority to the Catholic population that was used to justify "the Ascendancy" in Ireland. Moody stated about the Irish Rebellion of 1641 that were indeed massacres of Protestant settlers from England and Scotland by the Catholic Irish who resented being pushed off their land to make way for the Anglo-Scottish colonists, but that the numbers of dead were vastly exaggerated with some contemporary pamphlets claiming about 200, 000 massacred while the real number appears to be about 4, 000 killed. Moody further argued the claim there was a genocidal plan by the Irish elite to exterminate all of the Protestant settlers has no basis in fact, and the massacres were spontaneous explosions of hate. Moody argued that the "myth" of the 1641 uprising had been, and was still being used by the Protestant community of Northern Ireland (who are the descendants of the Anglo-Scottish settlers) to portray the "wickedness and savagery" of all Irish Catholics who were allegedly intent upon the slaughter of Protestants at the first opportunity. Moody stated the "myth" of the 1641 rebellion as a premeditated genocide organised by the Catholic Church that took hundreds of thousands of lives was being used to promote the "siege mentality" and sectarian hatred that was hindering peace efforts in Northern Ireland.

Moody attacked the "myth" of Orangism promoted by the Loyal Orange Order, which identified Catholicism with tyranny and Protestantism with freedom. Moody stated through William of Orange was indeed a Protestant, in the War of the Grand Alliance against France, his allies included the Holy Roman Emperor Leopold I and King Carlos II of Spain who were both Catholics, and argued the conflict was more of an Anglo-French war as William sought to resist the ambitions of King Louis XIV of France to dominate Europe rather than a Protestant-Catholic war as painted by the Loyal Orange Order. Moody maintained the way the Loyal Orange Order used the "myth" of the Battle of the Boyne, turning a dynastic dispute into a struggle for freedom was a way of maintaining Protestant supremacy in Ireland. Likewise, Moody attacked the "myth" of a Protestant community that was solidly and unconditionally Unionist throughout the centuries, noting the Scottish settlers in Ulster resisted giving oaths of allegiance to King Charles I in 1639; that many of the leaders of the Society of United Irishmen were Protestant; and the ferocious denunciations of Prime Minister William Ewart Gladstone by the Orange Order when he disestablished the Church of Ireland in 1869, which led to some Orange lodges to call for a repeal of the Union. Moody argued that the Unionism felt by most Irish Protestants was a "conditional" one, and noted in 1912–14 the Ulster Volunteers were prepared to fight the British to stay British. More recently, Moody noted that several Unionist groups, upset with measures by the British government, to end discrimination against the Catholic minority of Ulster, had been speaking of having Northern Ireland break away from the United Kingdom to form a new state that would guarantee Protestant supremacy, which Moody used to suggest again that most Unionists had only a "conditional" loyalty to the United Kingdom.

Moody was no less unsparing in his condemnation of nationalist "myths" than he was of Unionist "myths". Moody stated the nationalist thesis that Unionism in Ulster was merely something fabricated by the Crown and was not a real movement, is disapproved by the way that the Unionists had acted time after time to sabotage the efforts of the British government to come to terms with Irish nationalists, starting with the anti-Home Rule riot in Belfast in 1886 that killed 32 people to the present. Moody noted that the Ulster Volunteers in 1912–14 were encouraged by the leaders of the Conservative Party and the British Army to challenge the British government, the general strike by the Protestant working class in Northern Ireland in 1974 that ended the Sunningdale Agreement was clearly a mass movement directed against the efforts of the Crown to reach a compromise in Ulster. Moody argued that the popular thesis that the Great Famine of Ireland of 1845–50 in which millions starved to death was deliberately planned by the British government as a part of a genocidal plot to wipe the Irish off the face of the earth is not true, arguing that the famine was the result of the social-economic system that existed in Ireland at the time. Another nationalist "myth" that Moody attacked was the claim made during the "Land War" of 1879–81 that the Irish people had existed harmoniously on the land before the English conquest had imposed a "feudal" system on Ireland. Moody argued that "land war" was due to the combination of conditions peculiar to the late 1870s, instead of an explosion of long-running resentments as landlord-tenant relations were actually improving in the decade prior to the "land war"; the "Ascendancy" families who owned most of the land in Ireland were generally indifferent as opposed to oppressive landlords; and the claim that Ireland had no "feudalism" before 1169 was based on the mistranslation of various ancient Gaelic texts into English in the 19th century.

Finally, Moody attacked the "predestine nation" myth of Irish history that portrayed Irish history as one long struggle for freedom from the British Crown over the course of the last 800-odd years, which he complained reduced everything down to an "unending war with Britain" and did not really address any of the social questions facing modern Ireland in the 20th century. Moody argued that the mainstream Irish nationalists in the late 19th century wanted "home rule" (devolution of powers from the Westminster parliament to a new parliament in Dublin), not independence, as most people in Ireland did not wish to leave the United Kingdom. Moody stated the Home Rule movement that was opposed to independence and republicanism dominated Irish nationalism until the First World War, and only a small minority wanted an independent republic. Moody stated it was only the frustration caused by the inability of the government of Prime Minister H. H. Asquith to bring in home rule as he had promised in the face of opposition from Ulster unionists that led some Irish nationalists to turn to violence. Moody further argued the great sea-change in the public's views occurred between the Easter Rising in 1916 and the election of 1918, when Sinn Féin won the majority of seats outside of Ulster on a platform of winning independence and a republic by "any means necessary". Moody argued this "myth" of Irish history that Ireland would not be "redeemed" until all of Ireland is reunited, no matter what the cost in blood, was used to justify all of the IRA's violence and mayhem, who claimed to be acting in the name of the entire Irish nation, even through they had no mandate to do so.

Moody argued the "predestine nation myth" used by the IRA simply ignored the Unionism felt by much of the Protestant community in Northern Ireland as it was based on the assumption that if only the British Army withdrew from Northern Ireland, then the Protestants of Ulster would all happily join the Republic of Ireland. Moody ended his speech by remarking: "History is a matter of facing the facts of Irish history, however painful some of them may be, mythology is a way of refusing to face the facts. The study of history not only enlarges truth about our past, but opens the mind to ever new accessions of truth. On the other hand, the obsession with myths, and especially the more destructive myths, perpetuates the closed mind".

Moody's speech generated immense controversy, which continues to this day. A number of Irish historians such as John A. Murphy, Tom Dunne, Michael Laffan, F. S. L. Lyons, Ronan Fanning, and Steven Ellis welcomed Moody's speech as a long overdue call for a less nationalistic interpretation of Irish history. Moody's leading critics were Brendan Bradshaw and Desmond Fennell who accused him of essentially white-washing the history of British rule in Ireland. Bradshaw wrote at best, Moody was simply naïve, and his call for a more objective history served to sanitise readers to the injustices and suffering bore by the Irish people during the long rule of the Crown. Bradshaw also accused Moody of denigrating Irish nationalism, which served to not only downplay the wrongs suffered by the Irish people, but to disparage those who fought against British rule and their achievements in finally winning Irish independence in 1922. Fennell accused Moody of writing history to “meet the needs of the establishment”, and claimed the idea that the Irish history was a long struggle for freedom from the British was not a “myth”, but a fact that Moody was attempting to suppress.

The Australian historian Marnie Hughes-Warrington wrote the claim that Moody "…hoped to bring a about a revolution simply to denigrate the claims of Irish nationalists is not true". Hughes-Warrington stated that Moody was aware that the present always influenced one's evaluation of the past and she argued that he was attempting to do was find a way to look at the past that was objective and to understand Irish history on its own terms. In this regard, Hughes-Warrington maintained that Moody “…looked to science, which was seen to provide methods which could combat personal bias and render historical interpretations subject to external assessment and evaluation”, comparing Moody to the historians who take a “functionalist” line on Nazi Germany and the “Final Solution”, American historians who argued for giving slavery and racism a greater prominence in the teaching of American history, the “revisionist” historians of the French revolution and those historians who argue for a greater place in women in history.

== Sources ==
- Mulvey H. F., Theodore William Moody (1907–1984): an Appreciation, Irish Historical Studies, XXIV, 1984–5.
- F. S. L. Lyons, R. A. J. Hawkins editors, Ireland under the Union: Varieties of Tension: Essays in Honour of T. W. Moody
