= Manus O'Riordan =

Irish trade union leader (1949–2021)

Manus O'Riordan (30 May 1949 – 26 September 2021) was an Irish trade union leader and political activist.

== Biography ==
O'Riordan was the son of Michael O'Riordan and Kay Keohane, both socialists and activists. His father had fought in the International Brigades during the Spanish Civil War, and this greatly influenced the trajectory of O'Riordan's life.

He grew up in Portobello, Dublin. He got a scholarship to Synge Street CBS and went on to get a BA degree in economics and politics from University College Dublin, followed by an MA in economics and labour history from the University of New Hampshire, Durham, U.S. On his return to Ireland he worked in the research department of the Irish Transport and General Workers' Union (ITGWU) and, after amalgamations, of SIPTU, the Services, Industrial, Professional and Technical Union, from 1971 to 2010. Peter Cassells said of him: "Without Manus's intellectual underpinning of the partnership process, there would have been no partnership agreements."

O'Riordan had been a member of the Connolly Youth Movement, but moved to the British and Irish Communist Organisation (BICO) which promoted the "two nations theory" that Ulster Unionists constituted a separate Irish national community with a right to self-determination. He joined the Democratic Socialist Party founded by Jim Kemmy in 1982. The DSP later merged with the Irish Labour Party, but O'Riordan did not follow them and remained unaffiliated.

O'Riordan was a dedicated memorialist of the International Brigades in which his father had served during the Spanish Civil War. He was Ireland Secretary for the International Brigades Memorial Trust (IBMT) and a board member of Friends of the International Brigades Ireland.

He defended the reputation of Frank Ryan of the Brigades, who was accused by some of reneging on his anti-fascist beliefs after his capture in Spain and removal to Germany. O'Riordan transcribed the interrogation notes of Ryan, which he said showed that he had not changed his views. He sent his research to the IBMT to publish.

He was a lifelong supporter of Bohemian Football Club. On the day after his death, at an away game against Dundalk at Oriel Park, a minute's silence was held in his memory and banners raised saying RIP Manus and No Pasaran, the watchword of the International Brigades.

== Personal life ==
At the ITGWU, O'Riordan met Annette MacDonald, whom he married in 1974. They had three children. O'Riordan was a man of broad cultural interests, including theatre and music. He was a singer himself; an habitué of the Góilín Singers Club, and the Irish Traditional Music Archive holds recordings of his singing.

== Writings ==
O'Riordan wrote many articles on labour history and general history for publications such as the Irish Political Review, Saothar and others. He also wrote several books and book chapters.

== External references ==
ITMA recordings of the singing of Manus O'Riordan
