= Ajay Kakkar, Baron Kakkar =

British surgeon and life peer (born 1964)

The Right Honourable The Lord Kakkar KG KBE PC
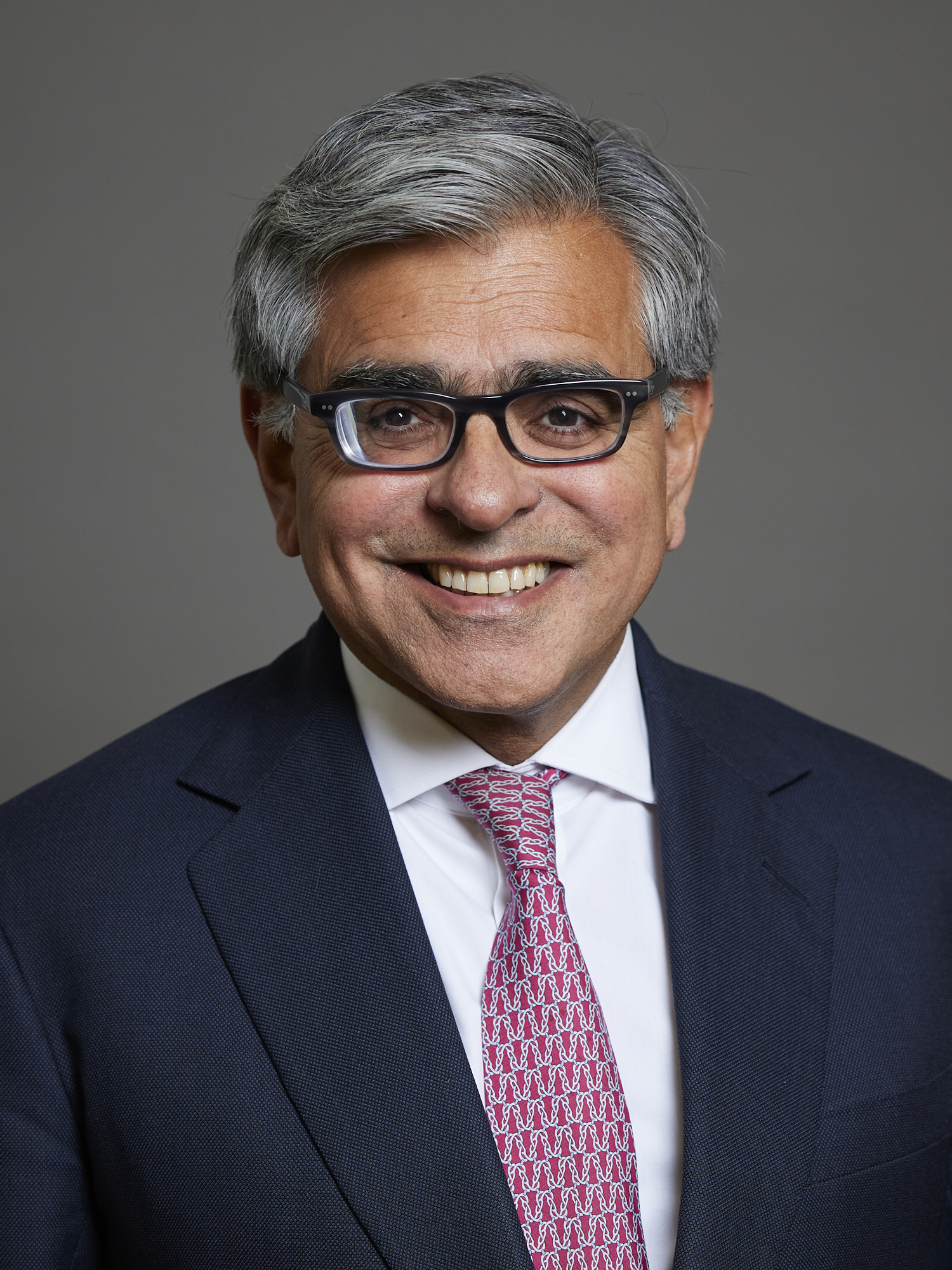
- Official portrait, 2023

Chairman of the Judicial Appointments Commission
- In office 3 October 2016 – 31 December 2022
- Preceded by: Christopher Stephens
- Succeeded by: Helen Pitcher

Chairman of the House of Lords Appointments Commission
- In office 1 October 2013 – 25 October 2018
- Preceded by: The Lord Jay of Ewelme
- Succeeded by: The Lord Bew

Member of the House of Lords
- Lord Temporal
- Life peerage 22 March 2010

Personal details
- Born: Ajay Kumar Kakkar; 28 April 1964 (age 62) Dartford, Kent, England
- Party: None (crossbencher)
- Education: Alleyn's School
- Alma mater: King's College London; Imperial College London

Ajay Kumar Kakkar, Baron Kakkar (born 28 April 1964) is an emeritus professor of surgery at University College London and a life peer.

== Early life and education ==
Ajay Kakkar was born in 1964 in Dartford to professor of vascular surgery Vijay Kakkar and his wife, a consultant anaesthetist.

He was educated at Alleyn's School in London before gaining admission to King's College London, where he gained first a BSc degree in basic medical sciences with pharmacology in 1985 and then an MBBS medical degree (with Distinction in Surgery) in 1988. Subsequently, he was awarded a PhD by Imperial College London in 1998, with his thesis titled "Tissue factor, thrombin generation and cancer".

Kakkar was elected as a Fellow of the Royal College of Surgeons of England (FRCS) in 1992 and a Fellow of the Royal College of Physicians of Edinburgh (FRCPE) in 2011. He is also a Fellow of the Academy of Medical Sciences (FMedSci).

His father was a pioneer in the use of low-molecular weight heparin therapy, and he followed in his footsteps as a surgeon and medical researcher.

== Career ==
Kakkar is Chair of King's Health Partners, the Academic Health Science Centre, Director of the Thrombosis Research Institute, London, and lectures and publishes widely on his specialism. He has worked with the NHS on its strategy to prevent venous thromboembolism (VTE). He is a Commissioner of the Royal Hospital Chelsea, former chair of the Board of Governors at Alleyn's School, Dulwich, a director of Howard de Walden Estates Limited (the company which owns the freehold to the Howard de Walden Estate, spanning the majority of Marylebone), and a Trustee of the Dulwich Estate. In December 2022 he succeeded Bernard Taylor as chairman of the Royal Commission for the Exhibition of 1851.

Kakkar was created a life peer on 22 March 2010 as Baron Kakkar, of Loxbeare in the County of Devon, and introduced in the House of Lords the same day. He sits on the crossbenches. He was Chairman of the House of Lords Appointments Commission from 2013 to 2018.

Kakkar has been noted for his work promoting British business as an ambassador for the United Kingdom. He took 11 trips in 2014 to promote business relations.

He was appointed Knight Commander of the Order of the British Empire (KBE) in the 2022 New Year Honours for services to healthcare and for public service. Kakkar served as Chair of the Judicial Appointments Commission from 2016 to 2022. On St George's Day 2024, he was appointed Knight Companion of the Order of the Garter (KG).

== Arms ==
Coat of arms of Ajay Kakkar, Baron Kakkar
Coronet A coronet of a Baron Crest An eagle reguardant wings expanded Or resting the dexter claws on a roundel per fess Argent and Azure. Escutcheon Argent two chevronels between three cornflowers Azure. Supporters Dexter a unicorn Argent armed crined and unguled Or sinister a tiger Or striped Sable. Motto Pervicax Semper (Always Firm) Orders Circlet of a Knight Companion of the Order of the Garter, insignia of a Knight Commander of the Order of the British Empire

Other offices
Preceded by The Lord Jay of Ewelme	Chairman of the House of Lords Appointments Commission; 2013–2018	Succeeded by The Lord Bew
Orders of precedence in the United Kingdom
Preceded by The Lord Hall of Birkenhead	Gentlemen; Baron Kakkar	Followed by The Lord Bichard
