= Trevor Elliott (geoscientist) =

British geoscientist

- Born: 26 August 1949; Lancashire, England
- Died: 28 January 2013 (aged 63)
- Education: University of Swansea; University of Oxford
- Scientific career
- Fields: Geoscience
- Workplaces: University of Liverpool

Trevor Elliott (26 August 1949 – 28 January 2013) was a British geoscientist, professor, and winner of the Bigsby Medal.

== Early life and career ==
Elliott was born in Lancashire. He received his BSc in Geology from the University College of Swansea in 1970, and his DPhil from the University of Oxford in 1974. He was a Royal Society postdoctoral fellow at the University of Leiden, and also carried out postdoctoral studies at the University of Reading.

In 1976 he became Lecturer in Sedimentology at the University College of Swansea, and in 1984 he was appointed George Herdman Professor of Geology at the University of Liverpool, where he remained for more than twenty years.

He was a visiting professor at both Iowa State University (on a Fulbright Scholarship), and Massachusetts Institute of Technology, and Distinguished Lecturer of the American Association of Petroleum Geologists.

In 1989 he was awarded the Bigsby Medal by the Geological Society of London.

== Personal life ==
He was married to Marianne Elliott, director of Liverpool University's Institute of Irish Studies.
