= Nina Fishman =

American-born English labour movement historian and political activist

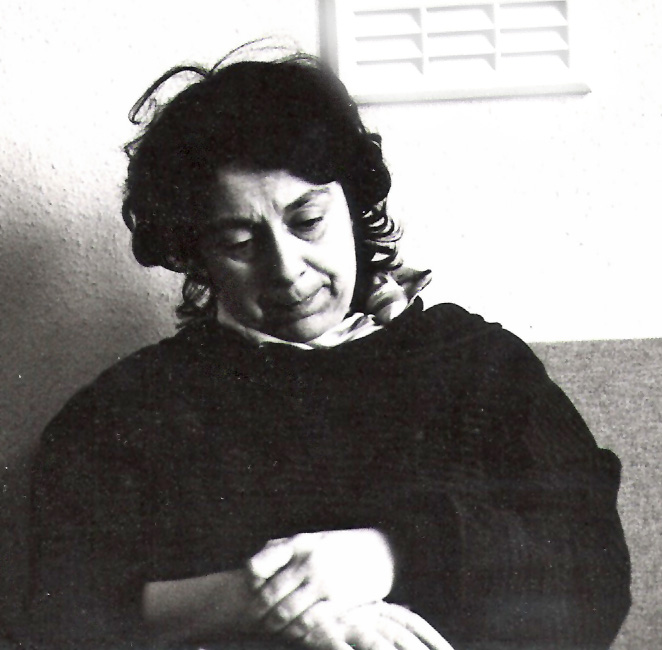
- Born: May 26, 1946; San Francisco, California, United States
- Died: December 5, 2009 (aged 63)
- Other name: Nina Stead
- Occupation: Academic
- Employers: University of Westminster; Swansea University
- Organizations: British and Irish Communist Organisation; Campaign for a Socialist Europe
- Movement: Communism; Co-determination; Electoral reform

Academic background
- Education: University of Sussex; Birkbeck
- Thesis: The British Communist party and the Trade Unions, 1933-45 (1994)
- Doctoral advisor: Eric Hobsbawm

Academic work
- Discipline: History
- Sub-discipline: Industrial and Labour History

Nina Fishman (26 May 1946 – 5 December 2009) was an American-born English labour movement historian and political activist.

Fishman was born in San Francisco. Her father, Leslie Fishman, was an economist at the University of California, Berkeley. However, he was also a member of the Communist Party of the United States and was forced out of the university in the late 1940s, moving to Idaho State College and then the University of Colorado at Boulder. Fishman attended junior high school and high school in Boulder, although she lived in Britain for a year in 1962 while her father held a visiting fellowship at the University of Cambridge.

Fishman returned to Britain to read economics at the University of Sussex, then known for student radicalism. Her family moved permanently to Britain in 1967 when her father was appointed to a teaching post at the University of Warwick, later securing a chair teaching economics at the University of Keele. She graduated in 1968 with a third, having spent most of her last year on the picket lines supporting striking building workers at the Barbican Centre in London. However, she then began a part-time history degree at Birkbeck College, London. She got a first and remained at Birkbeck to study for a PhD, supervised by Eric Hobsbawm, on the subject of the British Communist Party and the trade unions between 1933 and 1945.

In the 1970s, Fishman was a member of the British and Irish Communist Organisation, where she often wrote under the name Nina Stead. In 1980 she was a supporter of Neil Kinnock, advocating a greater reliance on trade unionism in a televised debate on divisions in the Labour Party.

She gained a teaching job at Harrow College of Higher Education, which merged with the Polytechnic of Central London in 1990. The polytechnic became the University of Westminster in 1992. She taught there until taking early retirement in 2007, serving from 2004 as Professor of Industrial and Labour History. Following her retirement she moved to Swansea, becoming an honorary research professor at Swansea University. In the 1990s, Fishman was one of several prominent members of Common Voice, a British group that advocated voting reform.

She spent the last decade of her life researching a biography of Arthur Horner, general secretary of the National Union of Mineworkers from 1946 to 1959. She died of cancer at the age of 63. Her will left money for the Fishman Bursary at the University of Keele.

== Publications ==
- The British Communist Party and the Trade Unions, 1933–45, Aldershot: Scolar Press (1995)
- Opening the Books: Essays on the Cultural and Social History of the British Communist Party, edited by E. J. Hobsbawm, Geoff Andrews, etc., and Nina Fishman (1995)
- Miners, Unions and Politics, 1910–47, by Alan Campbell, etc., Nina Fishman, and David Howell (1996)
- British Trade Unions and Industrial Politics: The Post-war Compromise, 1945–64, edited by Alan Campbell, Nina Fishman, and John McIlroy (1999)
- British Trade Unions and Industrial Politics: The High Tide of Trade Unionism, 1964–79, edited by John McIlroy, Nina Fishman, and Alan Campbell (1999)
- In Search of Social Democracy: Responses to Crisis and Modernisation, edited by John Callaghan, Nina Fishman, Ben Jackson, and Martin McIvor (2009)
- Arthur Horner: A Political Biography, by Nina Fishman (2010), Volume 1 1894–1944, Volume 2 1944–1968. London: Lawrence & Wishart.
