= Kay Keohane-O'Riordan =

Irish communist

- Born: Catherine Keohane; 22 September 1910; Clonakilty, County Cork, Ireland
- Died: 17 December 1991 (aged 81); Meath hospital, Dublin

Kay Keohane-O'Riordan (22 September 1910 – 17 December 1991) was an Irish social campaigner and communist.

== Early life and family ==
Kay Keohane-O'Riordan was born Catherine Keohane on Convent Road, Clonakilty, County Cork on 22 September 1910. Her parents were Julianna (née O'Regan) and Laurence Keohane, a stonemason. She was the fourth child of 3 sons and 4 daughters. Both of O'Riordan's parents, as children, had been evicted with their families from their tenant farms during the land war. Her maternal grandfather went on to establish an egg dealing business in Clonakilty, which still exists as Shannonvale Foods. O'Riordan's father was a native and literate Irish speaker, and a lifelong supporter of the Labour Party. Her sister, Máire, went on to become a labour and trade union activist.

She attended the local primary school and the Mercy Convent, Clonakilty. After leaving school, she entered the civil service, working for the Department of Social Welfare in Cork, Clonmel and later Dublin, before moving to the civil aviation section of the Department of Industry and Commerce. She married Michael O'Riordan in November 1946, at Rathmines catholic church, Dublin. Due to the marriage bar, she had to retire from the civil service. On their honeymoon in England, they visited Irish republicans in Parkhurst prison, who were imprisoned for taking part in the 1939 IRA bombing campaign. In February 1946, they moved from Cork to Dublin, living at 37 Victoria Street, South Circular Road, Portobello. They had two daughters and a son, their eldest daughter died in infancy. Their daughter, Brenda (born 1952), became a language teacher and a harpist, and their son, Manus (born 1949), worked for trade unions.

== Activism ==
O'Riordan was one of the founding members of the Irish Workers' League in 1947, with both she and her husband actively involved in the organisation. She negotiated being both a devout Catholic and a communist, having to seek out a priest, in Whitefriars Street Carmelite church, who was a sympathetic confessor. She was an active member of the Irish-Soviet Friendship Society and later the Ireland–USSR Society. While sympathetic to the USSR, she was also critical of them, including the suppression of the Hungarian uprising in 1956. She opposed all forms of antisemitism, and was involved in the activities of the Irish Jewish Museum and the local Jewish community in Portobello, which was close to her home. She was also involved in the anti-apartheid movement, and was involved in a number of campaigns for civil rights and the improvement of social conditions. She was active in children's literacy programmes, and in the assistance of refugees from Chile fleeing the Pinochet regime.

She was a longtime member of Conradh na Gaeilge, and raised her children as Irish speakers. She was a gifted singer and played the Irish harp, performing on Radio Éireann and at the Abbey Theatre. She was a member of the Music Association of Ireland and Cairde na Cruite. O'Riordan was also interested in German culture, music, and language and was involved with the Goethe Institute. She corresponded with Sean O'Casey over many years, and was the subject of two portraits by Gaetano de Gennaro in 1943.

O'Riordan died in Meath Hospital, Dublin on 17 December 1991. She was cremated in Glasnevin crematorium.
