= Shaista Gohir, Baroness Gohir =

British women's rights campaigner

The Right Honourable The Baroness Gohir OBE
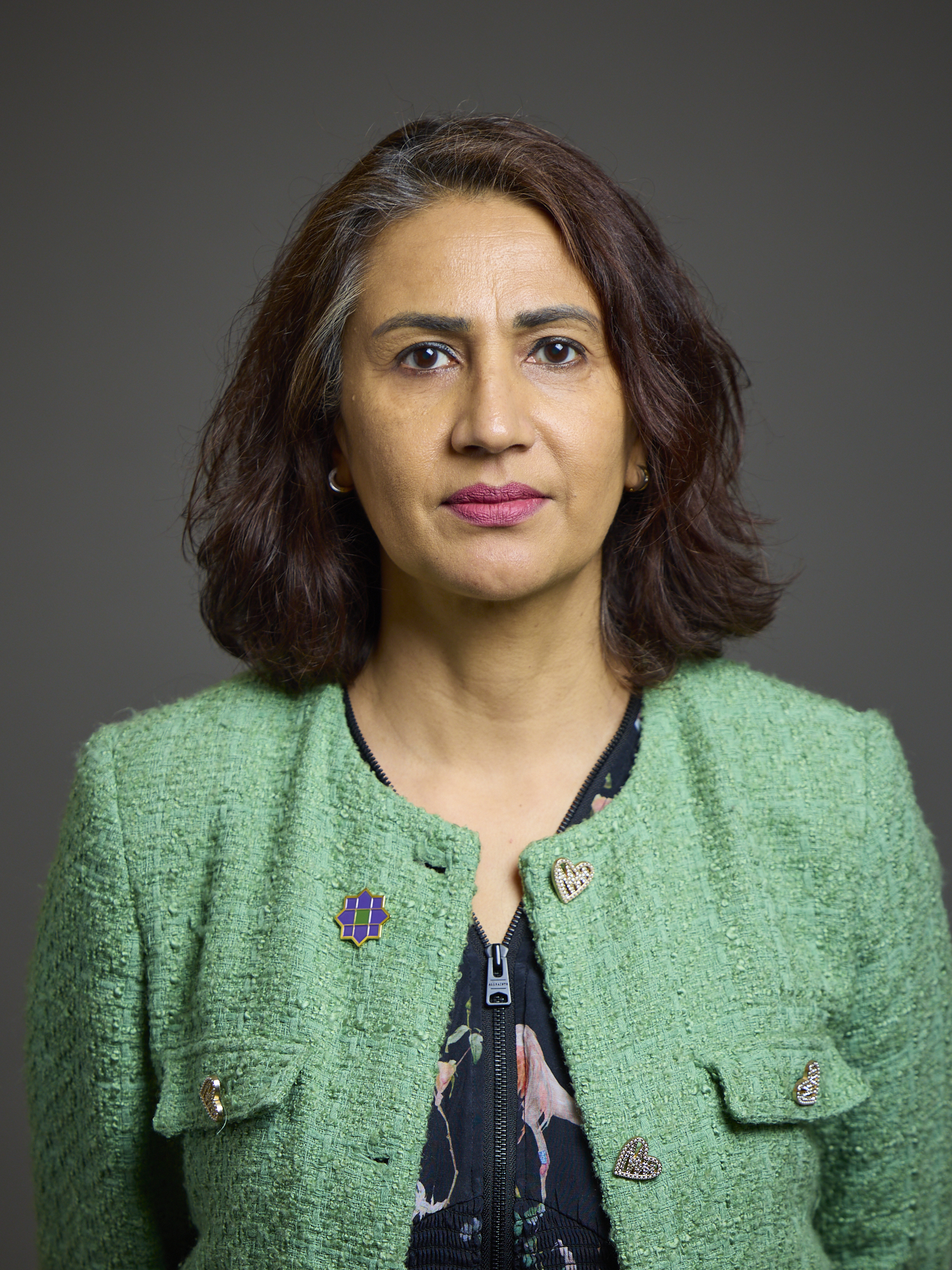
- Official portrait, 2026

Member of the House of Lords
- Lord Temporal
- Life peerage 24 June 2022

Personal details
- Born: 27 February 1969 (age 57)
- Party: Crossbench

Shaista Gohir, Baroness Gohir OBE (born 27 February 1969) is a British women's rights campaigner. She leads the national charity, Muslim Women's Network UK (MWNUK). Her nomination by the House of Lords Appointments Commission as a Crossbench life peer was announced on 17 May 2022.

== Personal life ==
Gohir's parents immigrated to England in the early 1960s and are originally from Daultala, Pakistan. Gohir is a mother to three children and lives in Hall Green.

== Awards and honours ==
She was appointed Member of the Most Excellent Order of the British Empire (MBE) in the 2008 Birthday Honours for services to Muslim People and to Community Relations and Officer of the Most Excellent Order of the British Empire (OBE) in the 2016 Birthday Honours for services to Gender Equality and Women's Rights.
