= Paul Bew =

Ulster-born historian

The Right Honourable The Lord Bew
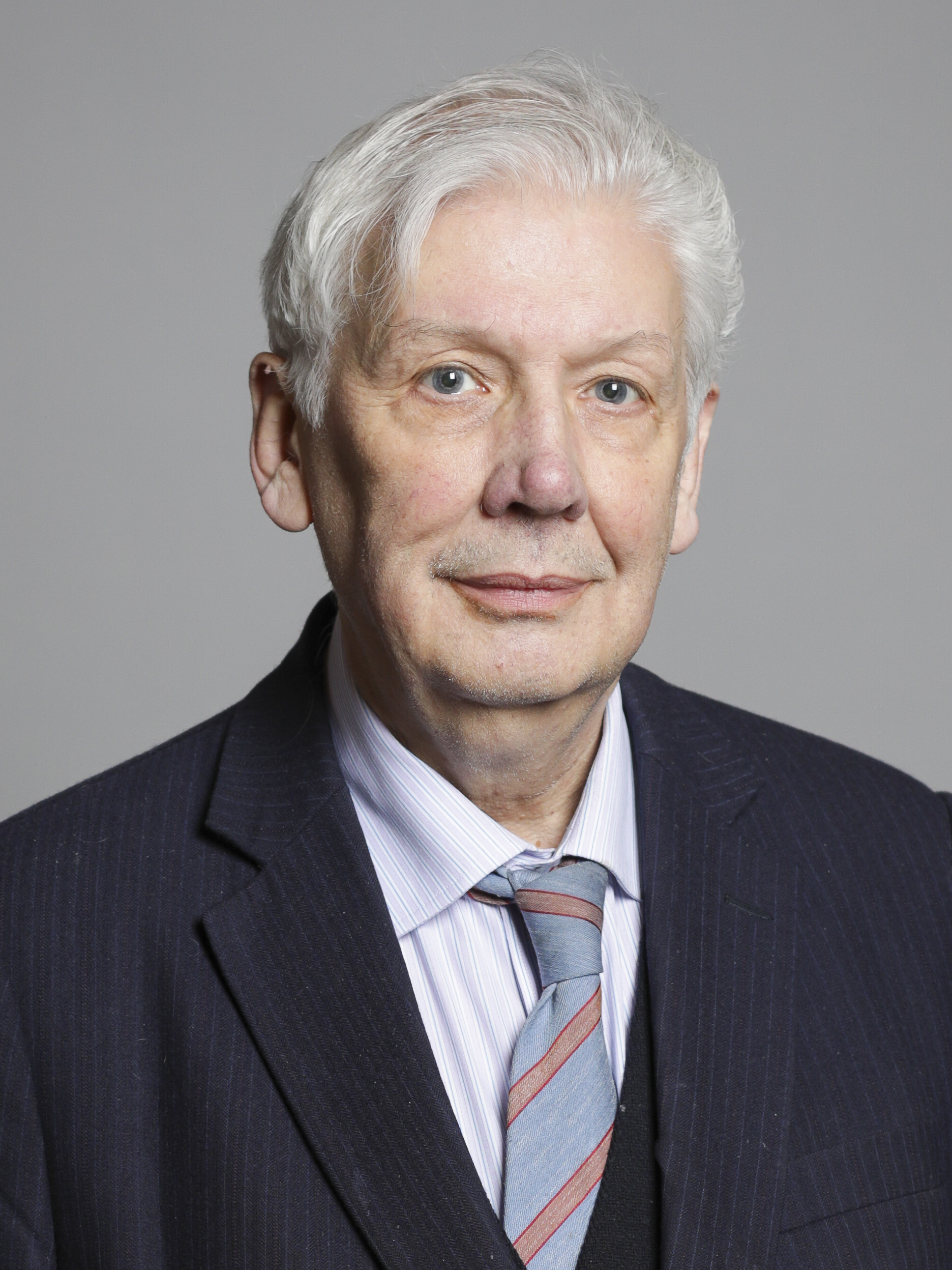
- Bew in 2019

Chair of the House of Lords Appointments Commission
- In office 25 October 2018 – 26 October 2023
- Preceded by: The Lord Kakkar
- Succeeded by: The Baroness Deech

Member of the House of Lords
- Lord Temporal
- Life peerage 26 March 2007

Personal details
- Born: 22 January 1950 (age 76) Belfast, Northern Ireland
- Party: None (crossbencher)
- Spouse: Greta Jones
- Children: John Bew
- Education: Campbell College, Belfast
- Alma mater: Pembroke College, Cambridge (BA, PhD)

Paul Anthony Elliott Bew, Baron Bew (born 22 January 1950), is a British historian from Northern Ireland and a life peer. He has worked at Queen's University Belfast since 1979, and is currently Professor of Irish Politics, a position he has held since 1991.

== Early life and education ==
Bew was born on 22 January 1950 in Belfast. He was educated at Brackenber House School, and Campbell College, a grammar school in Belfast. He studied for his BA and PhD at Pembroke College, Cambridge. His doctoral thesis was titled "The Politics of the Irish Land War, 1879-1882".

== Academic career ==
His first book, Land and the National Question in Ireland, 1858–82 was a revisionist study that challenged nationalist historiography by examining the clash between landowners and tenants as well as the conflict between large and small tenants. His third book, a short study of Charles Stewart Parnell published in 1980, challenged some of the arguments of the award-winning 1977 biography of Parnell by F. S. L. Lyons, though Lyons, one of the "doyens" of modern Irish history, acknowledged the younger historian's arguments by stating that "Nothing Dr Bew writes is without interest." Bew's central thesis was that Parnell was a fundamentally conservative figure whose ultimate aim was to secure a continuing position of leadership for the Protestant gentry in a Home Rule Ireland.

In 2007, Oxford University Press published Bew's Ireland: The Politics of Enmity 1789–2006, which forms part of the Oxford History of Modern Europe series. The book received positive reviews.

Bew acted as a historical advisor to the Bloody Sunday Inquiry between 1998 and 2001.

Bew was also involved in the Belfast Project, a Boston College initiative to record interviews with former participants in the Troubles, including former republican and loyalist paramilitaries. In 2014, Gerry Adams criticised Bew's handling of the Boston College project, as well as the journalist Ed Moloney and the former IRA volunteer Anthony McIntyre. Adams claimed Bew had deliberately chosen Moloney and McIntyre because they were unsympathetic to Adams. Bew expressed regret over the closure of the project, and stated further oral history projects of the Troubles were now "under a cloud".

== Political involvement ==
Bew's political stance has changed over the years. In a 2004 interview for The Guardian, he stated that "While my language was more obviously leftwing in the 1970s than today, that sympathy has always been there". As a young man, Bew participated in the People's Democracy marches. Bew was briefly a member of a group called the British and Irish Communist Organisation, which advocated the two nations theory of Northern Ireland. Bew was also a member of the Workers' Party, then known as Official Sinn Féin.

From 1991 to 1993, he served as President of The Irish Association for Cultural, Economic and Social Relations.

Bew is a unionist, and in 2019 called for the British government to do more to champion the union and recommended introducing a Department of the Union. He served as an "informal adviser" to David Trimble. Trimble and Bew are both signatories to the statement of principles of the Henry Jackson Society, which has been characterised as a neoconservative organisation.

=== House of Lords ===
In 2007, Bew was selected by the independent House of Lords Appointments Commission to be made a member of the House of Lords. His contributions to the Good Friday Agreement process were acknowledged with an appointment. He was created Baron Bew, of Donegore in the County of Antrim on 26 March 2007, and sits in the House of Lords as a crossbencher. He was introduced to the Lords on 15 May 2007, supported by Baroness O'Neill of Bengarve (a fellow academic and crossbencher) and Lord Trimble (i.e. his friend David Trimble). He made his maiden speech on 23 July 2007 during a debate on political donations in Northern Ireland.

Lord Bew was Chair of the Committee on Standards in Public Life, an advisory non-departmental public body of the United Kingdom Government, from September 2013 to August 2018. In October 2018, he was appointed as Chairman of the House of Lords Appointments Commission for a five-year term starting on 1 November 2018. He was succeeded by Baroness Deech on 26 October 2023.

== Personal life ==
Bew is married to Greta Jones, a history professor at the University of Ulster, with whom he has one son, John Bew, who is professor of history at the Department of War Studies, King's College London.

== Bibliography ==
=== Monographs ===
- Land and the National Question in Ireland, 1858–82. Gill & Macmillan. 1979.
- The State in Northern Ireland, 1921–72: Political Forces and Social Class. Manchester University Press. 1979.
- C.S. Parnell. Gill & Macmillan. 1980. ISBN 978-0-7171-1079-7.
- Sean Lemass and the Making of Modern Ireland, 1945–66. Gill & Macmillan. 1982. (with Henry Patterson)
- The British State and the Ulster Crisis: From Wilson to Thatcher. Verso Books. 1985. (with Henry Patterson)
- Conflict and Conciliation in Ireland, 1890–1910: Parnellites and Radical Agrarians. Clarendon Press. 1987.
- The Dynamics of Irish Politics. Lawrence & Wishart. 1989. (with Henry Patterson and Ellen Hazelkorn)
- Between War and Peace: The Political Future of Northern Ireland. Lawrence & Wishart. 1997.
- Northern Ireland 1921–2001: Political Power and Social Classes. Serif. 2002.
- Ideology and the Irish Question: Ulster Unionism and Irish Nationalism, 1912–1916. Clarendon Press. 1994.
- John Redmond. Dundalgan Press. 1996.
- Northern Ireland: A Chronology of the Troubles, 1968–99. Gill & Macmillan. 1999. (with Gordon Gillespie)
- The Making and Remaking of the Good Friday Agreement. The Liffey Press. 2007.
- Ireland: The Politics of Enmity 1789–2006. Oxford University Press. 2007.
- Enigma: A New Life of Charles Stewart Parnell. Gill & Macmillan. 2011.
- Churchill & Ireland. Oxford University Press. 2016.

=== Articles ===
- "Terrorism is back in Northern Ireland". The Spectator. 311 (9446): 18–19. 12 September 2009.

== See also ==
- List of Northern Ireland Members of the House of Lords

Other offices
Preceded by The Lord Kakkar	Chairman of the House of Lords Appointments Commission; 2018–2023	Succeeded by The Baroness Deech
Orders of precedence in the United Kingdom
Preceded by The Lord Walker of Aldringham	Gentlemen; Baron Bew	Followed by The Lord Hameed
