= British and Irish Communist Organisation =

- Leader: Brendan Clifford
- Founded: 1965
- Dissolved: 1980s
- Succeeded by: Athol Books; Aubane Historical Society; Ernest Bevin Society
- Ideology: Communism; Marxism–Leninism; Anti-revisionism; Two Nations Theory; Unionism (until 1990s)

The British and Irish Communist Organisation (B&ICO) was a small group based in London, Belfast, Cork, and Dublin. Its leader was Brendan Clifford. The group produced a number of pamphlets and regular publications, including The Irish Communist and Workers Weekly in Belfast. Τhe group currently expresses itself through Athol Books with its premier publication being the Irish Political Review. The group also continues to publish Church & State, Irish Foreign Affairs, Labour Affairs and Problems.

== History ==
=== Origins as Irish diaspora Maoist group ===
Communist Comment, ICO publication, from 1970

Brendan Clifford was an Irish emigrant from the Sliabh Luachra area of County Cork who had migrated to London and become involved in left-wing politics there. Clifford and some of his followers had been in Michael McCreery's Committee to Defeat Revisionism, for Communist Unity and later they joined the Irish Communist Group.

This body consisted largely of Irish people who were living in London and were opposed to the Soviet-aligned communist organisations intended for Irish people. Following a 1965 split, the Maoist wing named itself the Irish Communist Organisation, which later became the British and Irish Communist Organisation. The broadly Trotskyist wing, led by Gerry Lawless, became the Irish Workers' Group.

The ICO undertook an investigation into the development of Maoism, and concluded that it was not a suitable model for an anti-revisionist group. The Chinese Communist Party had supported some aspects of Nikita Khrushchev's "revisionism", and then been dishonest about its past positions.

One founder-member, Dennis Dennehy, was Secretary of the Dublin Housing Action Committee, which organised a highly successful protest movement in the early 1960s.

In 1968, the ICO issued a press release which defended the Warsaw Pact invasion of Czechoslovakia.

=== Dawning of the Troubles in Northern Ireland ===
In the initial stages of the conflict in Northern Ireland, the ICO (as it then was) took part along with the IRA in the defence of Catholic areas from Protestant attacks. It was critical of both the IRA leadership and of the people who later created the Provisional IRA. The ICO line was the two nations theory – that the Ulster Protestants were or had the potential to become a nation in their own right, and that Irish Catholics could not determine the whole of the island of Ireland as a country. Their seminal publication on the question was The Economics of Partition which ran to many editions. Another important ICO publication was Connolly and Partition, described by the ICO magazine the Irish Communist as offering a "Stalinist analysis" of Connolly's ideas. Following the adoption of this pro-Unionist position, the ICO withdrew and destroyed their earlier pro-Republican pamphlets. A number of members were opposed to this new direction (including Jim Lane) and resigned to form the Cork Workers' Club.

The B&ICO argued that it was the Southern government's refusal to accept the Ulster Protestants' right of self-determination that was the cause of the "Troubles":

"The cause of this strife is not Unionism nor the Unionists. Responsibility for it lies at the door of the Southern ruling class which on the basis of "One Historic Nation" has pursued a reactionary policy of national oppression for the last fifty years."

The Two Nations theory led B&ICO to consider that the Ulster Workers Council Strike was based on a reasonable demand – the rejection of a Council of Ireland until the Republic of Ireland dropped its constitutional claim to be the only legitimate government of the whole island. As is documented in the republished strike bulletin, there was no actual connection between them and the Ulster Workers Council. Their position naturally led to heavy criticism from the left and the nickname "The Peking Branch of the Orange Order".

The B&ICO's immediate line was to advocate a separate Trades Union Congress for Northern Ireland, and a front group, the "Workers’ Association for the Democratic Settlement of the National Conflict in Ireland" (usually abbreviated to the Workers' Association or WA) was formed to campaign for this and other aims.

The WA had both Catholic and Protestant members, some of whom had been involved in the various civil rights and socialist groupings in the late 1960s in Northern Ireland and the Republic. Notable WA members included Eamonn O'Kane, Jeff Dudgeon, Henry Patterson, Peter Cosgrove, Paul Bew and Manus O'Riordan. On 4 April 1972 a group of nine WA members chained themselves to radiators inside Iveagh House, the Department of External Affairs office in Dublin, calling for the removal of Articles 2 and 3 and with a banner and placards reading 'Recognise Northern Ireland' and 'National Rights for Protestants: Civil Rights for Catholics'. The nine were arrested and held overnight before bail was granted. They were convicted on 11 April of forcible entry of land. The Workers' Association also supported the Fine Gael government's strong measures against the IRA, while condemning Conor Cruise O'Brien for not deleting Articles 2 and 3. A similar group in the late 1970s was Socialists Against Nationalism, which included B&ICO members as well as members of the Socialist Party of Ireland (1971) and Jim Kemmy's Limerick Socialists. SAN campaigned against Articles 2 and 3 as well as the IRA.

They also advocated that British political parties should organise in Northern Ireland. Protestants and Catholics could not easily join parties strongly identified with the other community, but all three major British parties have always included Roman Catholics and the B&ICO theorised that this could have overcome the divisions.

The B&ICO strongly opposed Ulster independence, producing a number of pamphlets against it, most notably Against Ulster Nationalism. This warned that any such movement would produce civil war, since it would be unacceptable to Ulster Catholics. Despite this, its writings have had some influence in the Ulster independence movement, including activists who identify as part of the far right.

Future Ulster Unionist leader David Trimble was an enthusiastic reader of B&ICO and WA material, although the B&ICO was often critical of Trimble, claiming he was sympathetic to Ulster independence. Enoch Powell also expressed admiration for B&ICO's publications, calling them "nice, comfortable Unionist Marxists".

=== Bullock Report and opposition to Celtic nationalism in the 1970s ===
In the February 1974 general election, Clifford proposed advocating a vote for the Conservative Party over the Labour Party, but this proposal was defeated, and instead the group produced a pamphlet mildly supportive of Tory policies, without calling for a vote for any party. The group initially saw Thatcherism as a result of Labour's errors, but never supported privatisation or 'free market' ideas.

The ICO/B&ICO was strongly anti-Trotskyist, and it also opposed the Marxism of Rosa Luxemburg and Che Guevara.

All through the 1970s, the B&ICO was advocating Workers' Control as the next step forward. They regarded the scheme set out in the Bullock Report as a good idea, whereas most of the left opposed it. A small faction disagreed with the B&ICO leadership's stance on Workers' Control, (which it criticised as "Fabian" and "fundamentally anti-Marxist") and split to form the Communist Organisation in the British Isles.

One noted and controversial writer associated with the B&ICO was Bill Warren, who wrote a book and several articles challenging the traditional Leninist view of imperialism. John Lloyd, later editor of the New Statesman, was also a B&ICO member: some observers have suggested Lloyd's sympathetic view of the Ulster Unionists comes from being influenced by B&ICO's ideas. Labour party activist Nina Fishman was also a B&ICO member in the 1970s.

The B&ICO opposed Welsh nationalism and Scottish independence It also strongly supported the state of Israel, in contrast to the anti-Zionist positions of much the radical left of the time.

Unlike most of the left, the B&ICO supported the Khmer Rouge regime and opposed the Vietnamese invasion of Cambodia.

The B&ICO publicly praised the ideas and political career of Joseph Stalin, arguing Stalin had been unjustly depicted by historians.

Their actions at that time still cause some bitterness and have caused some commentators to express cynicism about the group's current pro-nationalist position.

=== Unconventional political positions in 1980s ===
In the 1980s, B&ICO was advocating the extension of the British parties to organise in Northern Ireland, and many B&ICO members were involved in the organisations, the Campaign for Labour Representation (CLR) and the Campaign for Equal Citizenship (CEC) in Northern Ireland. One member of B&ICO, James "Boyd" Black, ran on an "Equal Citizenship" platform in the Fulham by-election in 1986. The B&ICO group were extremely antagonistic to the Anglo-Irish Agreement, and much of their activity in Northern Ireland was directed at publishing material and supporting groups who shared their hostility to it.

The B&ICO also believed nuclear power and nuclear weapons were beneficial to humanity, and were against the Campaign for Nuclear Disarmament. It also praised Wojciech Jaruzelski's imposition of martial law in Poland. The B&ICO also took issue with other left-wing parties for adopting anti-Stalinist and anti-Zionist political positions.

When the Falklands War broke out, the B&ICO supported the UK war effort on the grounds the UK was more "progressive" than Argentina.

Members of the B&ICO, the Socialist Party of Ireland (1971) and Jim Kemmy's local organisation in Limerick merged to form the Democratic Socialist Party (Ireland) in 1982.

Some of B&ICO's members in the Republic were involved in the Campaign to Separate Church and State and published the linked Athol Books magazine, Church and State.

In tandem with these campaigns, the B&ICO also urged a hard line against the Provisional IRA; it opposed the 1981 Irish Hunger Strike. Its publications also opposed the campaign to free the Birmingham Six, insisting on their guilt.

In August 1988, Clifford was involved in controversy after his publication, A Belfast Magazine, printed an article, "The Knitting Professor" that was strongly critical of Mary McAleese. McAleese claimed the article was libellous and took legal action against the publication with the help of her lawyer, Donal Deeney QC. The case was eventually settled out of court in September 1990; as a result of the undisclosed settlement, A Belfast Magazine ceased publication for several years

The B&ICO's British branch, the Ernest Bevin Society, continued to agitate for Workers' Control throughout the 1980s. It also took unconventional positions, such as defending the British Monarchy and, most controversially, opposing the UK miners' strike (1984–1985).

=== Nationalist turn, de-activation, and afterlife as Athol Books ===
The B&ICO was never officially disbanded, but came to work solely through Athol Books, the Aubane Historical Society and the Ernest Bevin Society. Their chief outlet in Ireland became the magazines Irish Political Review (1986–present). In the United Kingdom it is the Labour and Trade Union Review, journal of the Ernest Bevin Society. This continues as Labour Affairs.

In the 1990s, B&ICO former members decided that the Irish nationalism that they had originally opposed had collapsed and that it was necessary to oppose the new, globalist forces that came to dominate the Republic of Ireland. The group called for a United Ireland based on a revival of the "traditional" Irish nationalism.

B&ICO's successors decided to advocate the extension of the Irish Labour Party to Northern Ireland. This project was however stymied by the Irish Labour Party in its 21st Century Commission report published in January 2009. It said, "we are not at all convinced that parties based in either Dublin or London have any real or significant contribution to make to Northern Ireland politics by organising there. ... We are also far from convinced that there is sufficient demand at present within the North itself for a single, all-Ireland, social-democratic party."

B&ICO criticised the Western response to Saddam Hussein's invasion of Kuwait, stating that Saddam had been given no chance to back down.

At one time, B&ICO was pro-Israeli, but, since the late 1980s, it has become pro-Palestinian. Mark Langhammer, the ex-Newtownabbey Labour Party councillor, is affiliated with this political tradition.

One writer associated with Athol Books, Dr Pat Walsh, has denied that there was an attempt to exterminate the Armenian people by the Ottoman authorities during World War I, arguing responsibility for their deaths rests with the British government: "If the deaths of Armenians are seen as 'genocide', the power that was most responsible for it was Britain. In the interest of destroying Germany and conquering the Ottoman territories, it made the Ottoman State an impossible place for Armenians to live in the space of a few months after they had lived in it peacefully for centuries."

Athol Books' Church and State magazine was critical of the British media's coverage of Pope Benedict XVI's visit to the United Kingdom, arguing the media were unfairly biased against the Catholic Church. Church and State also took issue with a BBC documentary on Cardinal John Henry Newman for featuring a contributor who suggested Newman may have been homosexual.

The Aubane Historical Society (AHS) is named after Aubane, an area of North Cork where some B&ICO members, including Brendan Clifford and Jack Lane, originate. According to Jack Lane, the AHS was originally intended to be a local history organisation but later expanded into the role of opposing the "revisionist" movement in Irish history. It has published research by a wide range of authors who question, from a variety of perspectives, the 'revisionist' analysis of Irish history by authors such as Roy Foster (Aubane Versus Oxford, The Embers of Revisionism), Peter Hart (Troubled History, Embers of Revisionism, West Cork's War of Independence), Eoghan Harris (An Affair with the Bishop of Cork, Embers of Revisionism, West Cork's War of Independence), Kevin Myers (Embers of Revisionism).

Activities in Britain continued through the Ernest Bevin Society, with its journal Labour & Trade Union Review, now Labour Affairs. Also a quarterly journal called Problems of Capitalism and Socialism, now just Problems.

== Partial bibliography ==
- The Crisis in the Unionist Party. (Belfast: Irish Communist Organisation, 1969).
- The Communist party of China and the 20th Congress of the C.P.S.U. (Belfast: B&ICO, 1970).
- On Trotskyism. (Belfast: B&ICO, 1971).
- The Economic struggle in Britain. (Belfast: B&ICO, 1971).
- The Two Irish nations: a reply to Michael Farrell. (Belfast: B&ICO, 1971).
- Is Wales a nation?. (Belfast: B&ICO, 1972).
- Connolly and Partition. (Belfast: B&ICO, 1972).
- The Economics of Partition. (Belfast: B&ICO, 1972).
- The Home Rule crisis, 1912–1914. (Belfast: B&ICO, 1972).
- Catholic political culture and the Constitution of Ireland. Jack Gannon. (Belfast: B&ICO, 1972).
- Article 44: the historical background to Constitutional change in Southern Ireland. (Belfast: B&ICO, 1972.)
- The Twentieth Congress and After. Neil Goold. (Belfast: B&ICO, 1973).
- Zionism: its European origins. (Belfast: B&ICO, 1974).
- A Reply to Michael Barratt Brown. (London: Communists for Europe in association with the B&ICO.)
- The Stalin Era. Anna Louise Strong. (Belfast: B&ICO, 1976).
- Against Ulster nationalism. (Belfast: B&ICO, 1977).
- How Right are the Racists?. Peter Brooke. (Belfast: B&ICO, 1978).
- Stalin and the Irish working class. (Belfast: B&ICO, 1979).
- The EEC: The Economic Case for!. (London: B&ICO, 1979).
