= Nicky Chapman, Baroness Chapman =

British peer and activist (1961–2009)

The Right Honourable The Baroness Chapman
- Chapman in 2008

Member of the House of Lords
- Lord Temporal
- Life peerage 24 June 2004 – 3 September 2009

Personal details
- Born: 3 August 1961
- Died: 3 September 2009 (aged 48)

Nicola Jane Chapman, Baroness Chapman (3 August 1961 – 3 September 2009) was a British peer and disability rights activist.

Chapman was born in Leeds, with a congenital disability, Osteogenesis imperfecta (brittle bone disease). She was expected to survive only a few hours after her birth, but lived into her 40s, by which time she estimated she had at least 600 bone fractures. She reached 2 feet 9 inches (84 cm) in height, and used an electric wheelchair.

She was educated at home, and then at John Jamieson School in Leeds, a school for children with physical disabilities. She later moved to the mainstream Park Lane College of Higher Education and then studied mathematics and management at Trinity and All Saints College in Horsforth. She was a volunteer tutor for the Apex Trust, then worked at Leeds City Council and then became a teacher in adult education, before her disability forced her to give up work. She continued as a volunteer disability activist, campaigning for independent living and access to public buildings. She was chair of the Leeds Centre for Integrated Living and the Leeds United Disabled Organisation (Ludo).

She was appointed to the House of Lords on 24 June 2004 as Baroness Chapman, of Leeds in the County of West Yorkshire and was the first person with a congenital disability to sit in the House of Lords. Her peerage was conferred on the recommendation of the House of Lords Appointments Commission, sometimes known as the "People's Peers" scheme. She had been nominated for her peerage by the Habinteg Housing Association, an organisation that provides practical support for those with disabilities, which she chaired.

She gave her maiden speech in the debate on the Mental Capacity Bill, critiquing provisions that would allow an appointed person to make medical decisions on behalf of a disabled patient, saying that "If the Bill had been passed 43 years ago, I would not be here." She later spoke against proposals to assist people with a terminal illness to end their life. She also campaigned for section 36 of the Disability Discrimination Act 1995 to be brought into force, giving taxi drivers a duty to transport passengers in wheelchairs.

She had a love of Leeds United Football Club, regularly attended games at Elland Road and was chair of the Leeds United Disabled Supporters Organisation. In 2010 Leeds United renamed the banqueting suite to "The Nicky Chapman Suite".

She died of pneumonia, at Leeds General Infirmary.

== Recognition ==
In 2010 Leeds United renamed the banqueting suite to "The Nicky Chapman Suite". Chapman had a love of Leeds United Football Club, regularly attended games at Elland Road and was chair of the Leeds United Disabled Supporters Organisation.

Chapman's name is one of those featured on the sculpture Ribbons, unveiled in 2024.
