= Thomas Desmond Williams =

Irish historian (1921–1987)

Thomas Desmond Williams (26 May 1921 – 18 January 1987) was an Irish academic and Professor of Modern History at University College Dublin (UCD) from 1949 to 1983 and joint editor of Irish Historical Studies from 1938 till 1973. Although Williams published little he has had "considerable" influence on Irish historiography. He worked as a British intelligence operative during the Second World War.

== Biography ==
His parents were UCD Professor of Education W.J. Williams and Angela Williams (née Murnaghan). His maternal grandfather was George Murnaghan. He attended a primary school run by Dominican nuns and was taught by his father for his secondary education.

At UCD he won scholarships, and in 1942 was awarded the John Brooke memorial scholarship, after which he joined the legal profession. He worked for the British Foreign Office and was a member of British Intelligence during the Second World War. His MA was titled "The Genesis of National Socialism" and was supervised by John M. O'Sullivan.

In 1944 he became a research student at Peterhouse, Cambridge, and following his failure to be awarded a fellowship there returned to Ireland, where he was appointed Professor of Modern History at UCD in 1949. In 1953, in a series of articles in the Leader and Irish Press, he accused the war-time Irish Minister to Spain, Leopold Kerney, of having been a Nazi collaborator. Kerney sued him and the two publications for libel. Despite Williams having been supplied with captured German documents by the British Foreign Office to boost his case and Kerney being refused the right to present Irish Ministry documents in support of his action, Kerney won the case, which was settled out of court.

== Works ==
=== Books ===
- Williams, T. Desmond (1973). Secret Societies in Ireland

=== Articles ===
- Williams, T. Desmond (1956). "Adolf Hitler and the Historians". University Review. 1 (9): 37–51. JSTOR 25504397.
- Williams, T. Desmond (1956). "Negotiations Leading to the Anglo-Polish Agreement of 31 March 1939". Irish Historical Studies. 10 (37): 59–93. doi:10.1017/S0021121400016151. JSTOR 30004759. S2CID 222505506.

== See also ==
- Kevin Myers
