= Desmond Fennell =

Irish intellectual (1929–2021)

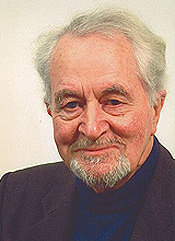
- Born: Desmond Carolan Fennell; 29 June 1929; Belfast, Northern Ireland
- Died: 16 July 2021 (aged 92)
- Education: Belvedere College; University College Dublin; Trinity College Dublin; Bonn University
- Occupations: Philosopher, writer, linguist
- Spouse: Mary Troy

Desmond Carolan Fennell (29 June 1929 – 16 July 2021) was an Irish writer, essayist, cultural philosopher, and linguist. Throughout his career, Fennell repeatedly departed from prevailing norms. In the 1950s and early 1960s, with his extensive foreign travel and reporting and his travel book, Mainly in Wonder, he departed from the norm of Irish Catholic writing at the time. From the late 1960s into the 1970s, in developing new approaches to the partition of Ireland and the Irish language revival, he deviated from political and linguistic Irish nationalism, and with the philosophical scope of his Beyond Nationalism: The Struggle against Provinciality in the Modern World, from contemporary Irish culture generally.

Fennell opposed the Western neo-liberal ideologies. In 1991, Fennell wrote a pamphlet challenging the prevalent critical view of Seamus Heaney as a poet of the first rank; in 2003 he wrote a small book where he revised the standard account of European history, and in 2007, his essay Beyond Vasari’s Myth of Origin offered a new version of its early history.

== Biography ==
=== Early life and education ===
Desmond Fennell was born on the Antrim Road in Belfast in 1929. He was raised in Dublin from the age of three—first in East Wall, and then in Clontarf. His father, a Sligoman, lost his job during the American Great Depression but prospered in Dublin in the wholesale grocery business. His mother was the daughter of a Belfast shopkeeper. His grandfather was a native Irish speaker from the Sperrins in County Tyrone.

In Dublin, Fennell attended the Christian Brothers O'Connell School and Jesuit Belvedere College. In the Leaving Certificate Examination, he obtained first place in Ireland in French and German and was awarded a scholarship in classical languages at University College Dublin, which he entered in 1947. While completing a BA in history and economics, he also studied English and Spanish at Trinity College Dublin.

Inspired by the teaching of Desmond Williams, Fennell went on to pursue an MA in modern history from University College Dublin, which he obtained in 1952 after spending two semesters at Bonn University in Germany. He then spent three years teaching English in a new Opus Dei secondary school near Bilbao, Spain, and conducted a study tour of American schools on its behalf.

Back in Germany in 1955, as an English newsreader on Deutsche Welle, he contributed articles to Comhar and The Irish Times; radio talks to writer Francis McManus at Radio Éireann; and theatre criticism to the London Times. Travel in the Far East 1957-58 gave the material for his first book Mainly in Wonder, 1959. His immersion in German culture resulted in Fennell's interest in the human condition.

As a student, Fennell contributed a column in Irish to The Sunday Press. There he befriended Douglas Gageby, who later became editor of The Irish Times. Gageby gave Fennell free rein to publish in the newspaper. After a year saving money as the first sales manager in Germany for the Irish airline Aer Lingus, he spent 1960 researching a book in what was then "pagan" Sweden and contributed the first direct reportage from the Soviet Union (15 articles) to appear in an Irish newspaper to The Irish Times.

In the early 1960s, Fennell contributed essays for several Dublin publications and was briefly exhibitions officer of the new Irish Arts Council. Influenced by the approaching fiftieth anniversary of the 1916 Rising, he read the writings of the leaders of the Irish Revolution, identifying their project as "restorative humanism": a movement aiming to redefine Ireland as a democratically self-governing nation, economically self-sustaining, intellectually self-determining and culturally self-shaping. Some Fennell essays of this time were "Will the Irish Stay Christian?", "The Failure of the Irish Revolution – and Its Success", "Cuireadh chun na Tríú Réabhlóide" and "Irish Catholics and Freedom since 1916". He collaborated with Fr. Austin Flannery OP, editor of the monthly journal Doctrine and Life which published his writings.

Back in Ireland in 1961, Fennell outlined his Swedish experience in an essay "Goodbye to Summer" which drew press reaction from Sweden to the US and was referred to by President Eisenhower. Fennell had visited Sweden attracted by what he believed was a new liberal, post-European, post-Christian venture in living, but it did not meet his expectations. As a result, that year began his long-lasting effort to understand the history and ideology of the contemporary West.

In 1963, in Dublin, Fennell married Mary Troy, a Limerick woman and student of Semitic languages at Trinity College. The couple went on to have five children.

=== Developing career and publications ===
In 1964, Fennell moved with wife and son to Freiburg, Germany, as assistant editor of Herder Correspondence, the English-language version of Herder-Korrespondenz; a Catholic journal of theology, philosophy and politics which played a leading "progressive" role during the Second Vatican Council. In 1966, as editor, Fennell returned to Dublin. Two years later he resigned and moved with his family to Maoinis in the Irish-speaking South Connemara. In a book which he edited, The Changing Face of Catholic Ireland (1968) he included many of his anonymous essays for Herder Correspondence.

During the following four years, Fennell wrote an influential column for the Dublin Sunday Press. His principal themes in the Connemara period (1968–79) were the "revolution" of the Gaeltacht or Irish-speaking districts (which he helped to initiate and in which he participated, drawing on Maoist ideas) and advocating, in imitation of the revival of Hebrew, migration of the nation's scattered Irish speakers to the Gaeltacht to build there the base for the restoration of Irish; the pursuit of a settlement in Northern Ireland at war; decentralisation of Irish government to regions and districts; and a "Europe of Regions". In those last pursuits, he was inspired by Tom Barrington, director of the Institute of Public Administration and by the Breton political émigré in Connemara, Yann Fouéré. This activity was issued in an advocacy, partly inspired by the early Irish socialist William Thompson, of an Ireland, a Europe and a world rendered self-governing as "communities of communities". It was spelt out in the pamphlet with maps "Sketches of the New Ireland" (1973) and the book Beyond Nationalism (1985).

Mainly in The Irish Times, The Sunday Press and several pamphlets, Fennell substituted for the nationalist aim of an all-Ireland Irish state for a supposedly all-Ireland Irish nation the recognition of the Northern unionists as British – "the Ulster British" – and the aim of British-Irish joint rule in the North. Having persuaded the North's Social Democratic and Labour Party to declare for this, he helped Sinn Féin to elaborate its four-province federal proposal of Éire Nua (a policy later dropped by Provisional Sinn Féin, but retained by Republican Sinn Féin). In 1977 he made the first of what would be six visits to literary congresses in Zagreb, Croatia, in the course of which he would become an admirer of Yugoslav Marxist socialism.

From 1976 to 1982, Fennell lectured in political science and tutored in modern history at University College Galway. In 1980 he resumed his column in the Sunday Press and two years later returned to Dublin as a lecturer in English writing at the Dublin Institute of Technology.

== Global experience and activism ==
=== Approaching consumerist liberalism ===
In his column, and in the books The State of the Nation: Ireland Since the Sixties (1983) and Nice People and Rednecks: Ireland in the 1980s (1986), while continuing his "two ethnic identities" line on the North, he shifted focus to the consumerist liberalism he believed had risen to ascendancy in the Dublin media (associated with what Fennell perceived as the 'smug liberal elite' of Dublin 4). He opposed the standard divorce legislation which the new liberals sponsored — preferring a choice of indissoluble and soluble marriage — and their soft line on abortion and anti-nationalist historical revisionism as well. In the view of Tom Garvin, lecturer in politics in University College Dublin, Fennell saw "the rise of the liberals" in Ireland as part of a process "which is turning the Republic back into a mere province of the United Kingdom". With A Connacht Journey (1987) Fennell returned to travel writing. In 1990, the National University of Ireland awarded him its DLitt (Doctor of Literature) degree for his published work.

In the early 1990s, Fennell recognised that the Irish Revolution had not achieved its national self-determining aim, especially in the intellectual, cultural and economic fields. At the same time, in the face of what he termed "the consumerist empire", Fennell moved on from his communitarian social idealism, and directed his efforts to a realistic, rather than idealistic, approach.

Bloomsway: A Day in the Life of Dublin (1990) was a visit to Joycean territory. Fennell also visited East Germany to record (sympathetically) the last days of that Communist state in Dreams of Oranges. His pamphlet on Seamus Heaney "Whatever You Say, Say Nothing: Why Seamus Heaney is No. 1" angered admirers of Heaney because, apart from contesting Heaney's reputation as a major poet (Fennell referred to him teasingly as "Famous Séamus"), it found fault with him for ignoring the struggle of his fellow Catholics in Northern Ireland. Still, the pamphlet's full text was republished in the UK and the US. The following year, Fennell was proposed a second time for membership of Aosdána, the Irish state-funded association of writers and artists, this time by the novelists Francis Stuart and Jennifer Johnston, but again without success, because he was ineligible as a non-fiction writer.

=== Post-western theories and later life ===
A month in Minsk, Belarus, in 1993 and a six-week holiday in the US in 1994 initiated Fennell's second abroad period. During it, he perceived that the US, since the justification of the atomic bombings of 1945 and what he believed to be a comprehensive new morality of the 1960s and 1970s, had rejected European civilisation, embarked on a new "post-western" course, and brought Western Europe along with it. After a further 15 months in Seattle exploring this idea, he returned briefly to Dublin, published Uncertain Dawn: Hiroshima and the Beginning of Postwestern Civilisation, and in 1997 left for Italy to reflect further on this and related matters. He remained there for the following 10 years, in Anguillara on Lake Bracciano near Rome. In 2003 he and his wife, who had remained in Galway with three of their children, agreed to divorce. Shortly after, a Dublin friend, Miriam Duggan, a teacher who had often visited him in Italy, became his partner. During those Italian years, Fennell developed his post-European view of the present-day West and in The Revision of European History (2003) explored how the course of Europe had culminated with an exit from it. He returned to Ireland in 2007.

In 2008, Fennell created controversy in the letters columns with an article in The Irish Times on the decline of the West's white population. Western society once had "a mighty will to reproduce" which resulted in "Westerners overflowing from Europe to populate much of the world". Now "in North America, as in Europe, the white population is not reproducing itself". Fennell argued that the decline in the Western birthrate was due to the replacement, after WW2 "of the rules of European civilisation with new rules".

In his final years, Fennell had contact with the successor group of the British and Irish Communist Organisation, although he differed from them on certain points. Some of his final books were published by their Athol Press imprint, and he wrote articles for their monthly magazine, the Irish Political Review.

== Publications ==
=== Books ===
- Mainly in Wonder (1959)
- The Changing Face of Catholic Ireland (1968)
- The State of the Nation: Ireland since the 60s (1983)
- Beyond Nationalism: The Struggle against Provincialism in the Modern World (1985)
- Nice People and Rednecks: Ireland in the 1980s (1986)
- A Connacht Journey (1987)
- The Revision of Irish Nationalism (1989)
- Bloomsway: A Day in the Life of Dublin (1990)
- Heresy: The Battle of Ideas in Modern Ireland (1993)
- Dreams of Oranges: An Eyewitness Account of the Fall of Communist East Germany (1996)
- Uncertain Dawn: Hiroshima and the Beginning of Postwestern Civilisation (1996)
- The Postwestern Condition: Between Chaos and Civilisation (1999)
- The Turning Point: My Sweden Year and After (2001)
- The Revision of European History (2003)
- Cutting to the Point: Essays and Objections 1994–2003 (2003)
- About Behaving Normally in Abnormal Circumstances (2007)
- Ireland After the End of Western Civilisation (2009)
- Third Stroke Did It: The Staggered End of European Civilisation (2012)
- About Being Normal: My Life in Abnormal Circumstances (2017)

=== Pamphlets ===
- The Northern Catholic (1958)
- Art for the Irish (1961)
- The British Problem (1963)
- Iarchonnacht Began (1969)
- A New Nationalism for the New Ireland (1972)
- Take the Faroes for Example (1972)
- Build the Third Republic (1972)
- Sketches of the New Ireland (1973)
- Towards a Greater Ulster (1973)
- Irish Catholics and Freedom since 1916 (1984)
- Cuireadh chun na Tríú Réabhlóide (1984)
- Whatever You Say, Say Nothing: Why Seamus Heaney Is No.1 (1991)
- Savvy and the Preaching of the Gospel (2003)
