= Two nations theory (Ireland) =

Theory of nationality in Ireland

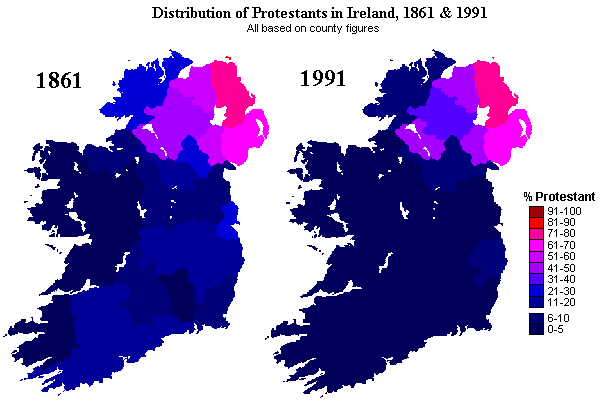

In Ireland, the two nations theory proposes that there are two peoples on the island with national rights to self-determination: an Irish nation substantially formed by the Roman Catholic majority; and, concentrated in the north-east (in parts of Ulster), a Protestant community of Scottish and English descent which is insistent on a continued union with Great Britain.

Emerging in the 19th century as a response to the drive for Irish self-government, variants of the theory gained renewed currency from the late 1960s when the onset of Northern Ireland Troubles called the 1921 partition settlement into question. Persuaded that there was a prospect of British withdrawal, paramilitary-associated loyalists considered the possibility of Ulster Protestants constituting the core of a national community independent of both London and Dublin.

Broader acceptance was found among unionists for a theory reformulated on purportedly Leninist principles by a small left-wing grouping. While blaming the renewed conflict on British misrule, this rejected Ulster nationalism and accepted unionism as a popular expression of a legitimate British interest and identity.

Since the 1998 Belfast Agreement, this perspective has been challenged within unionism by renewed interest in the language and narrative of Ulster Scots, and by the British government's formal recognition of Ulster Scots in 2022 as a "national minority" within the framework of an agreement re-establishing a devolved Northern Ireland Executive.

== Developed in opposition to an all-Ireland parliament ==
According to S J Connolly's Oxford Companion to Irish History, the two nations theory first appeared in the book Ulster As It Is (1896) by the Unionist Thomas Macknight. But as early as 1843, while protesting that its readers wished only to preserve the Union, Belfast's leading paper, the Northern Whig, had proposed that if differences in "race" and "interests" argue for Ireland's separation from Great Britain then "the Northern 'aliens', holders of 'foreign heresies' (as [Daniel] O'Connell says they are)" should have their own "distinct kingdom", Belfast as its capital.

In response to the First Home rule Bill in 1886, Radical Unionists (Liberals who proposed federalising the relationship between all countries of the United Kingdom) likewise argued that "the Protestant part of Ulster should receive special treatment . . . on grounds identical with those that support the general contention for [Irish] Home Rule" "Ulster", in the view of the Radical leader, John Bright, "may be deemed a nationality differing from the rest of Ireland as much as Wales differs from England". Northern unionists expressed no interest in a Belfast parliament, but in summarising The Case Against Home Rule (1912), L. S. Amery similarly insisted that "if Irish Nationalism constitutes a nation, then Ulster is a nation too". The same position was taken by the Tory writer W. F. Moneypenny in his 1913 book The Two Irish Nations: An Essay on Home Rule, and was later taken up by the British Conservative politician Bonar Law.

Irish nationalists rejected these positions. O'Connell suggested that in Ireland Protestantism was very largely a function of political privileges sustained by the connection with England, so that "If the Union were repealed and the exclusive system abolished, the great mass of the Protestant community would with little delay melt into the overwhelming majority of the Irish nation". This remained the position of constitutional nationalism (John Redmond declared "'the two nation theory' an abomination and a blasphemy") and of the republican movement.

== Two-nation "heresy" and partition ==
The 1916 Proclamation of the Irish Republic spoke of "the differences carefully fostered by an alien Government, which have divided a minority from the majority". Michael Collins, writing in the wake of the Anglo-Irish Treaty of 1921, insisted that had Britain not maintained this policy of divide et impera, "Protestant and Catholic would have learned to live side by side in amity and cooperation" and Ireland would long since have "taken her rightful place in the world". Collins's civil war nemesis, Éamon de Valera, articulated the same conviction, although like Collins he appeared willing to accept some form of partition as a temporary expedient. According to De Valera, "the essence of the persistence of Partition" was that Unionists perceived themselves as a governing group who feared that they would become a minority inside a temperamentally different State.

There was a notable Sinn Féin dissenter from the one-nation doctrine. When Lloyd George unveiled the Government of Ireland Bill of 1920, Belfast's leading nationalist paper, the Irish News, ran an editorial suggesting that the case for partition had been made for the Prime Minister in an "eloquent exposition of Ireland’s ‘dual nationhood'" by Fr. Michael O’Flanagan, Sinn Féin's Vice-president. In an open letter to Lloyd George published in June 1916, two months after the Easter Rising, O'Flanagan had argued that while "geography has worked hard to make one nation out of Ireland; history has worked against it", and that the enduring division could not, or should not, be overcome by force:

The island of Ireland and the national unit of Ireland simply do not coincide. In the last analysis the test of nationality is the wish of the people… The Unionists of Ulster have never transferred their love and allegiance to Ireland. They may be Irelanders, using Ireland as a geographical term, but they are not Irish in the national sense… We claim the right to decide what is to be our nation. We refuse them the same right. After three hundred years England has begun to despair of making us love her by force. And so we are anxious to start where England left off. And we are going to compel Antrim and Down to love us by force.

O'Flanagan (who was to oppose the 1921 Anglo-Irish Treaty) was committed to an Ireland independent and united, but believed it could not be achieved without acknowledging the complications that Protestant Ulster presented. (Citing O'Flanagan, in advance of India's partition the Indian jurist and social reformer Babasaheb Ambedkar made the same argument in respect of sub-continent's Muslim minority).

== Revived in response to the Northern Ireland Troubles ==
In The Irish Border as a Cultural Divide (1962), a work cited, more than six decades after its publication, by former Northern Ireland First Minister, Arlene Foster, as "required reading for all on the so-called Irish question", the Dutch geographer Marcus Willem Heslinga argued that the partition of Ireland reflected realities of life on the island. He noted that "in many respects contacts across the Irish Sea are more numerous and more intensive than those across the land boundary", and that between north and south there was a genuine national divide: "separate political affinities, separate religious affinities and separate traditions and symbols".

A similar view was also put forward by the Irish Communist Organisation (ICO) (later the British and Irish Communist Organisation) in 1969, in response to what was the onset of the Troubles in Northern Ireland. Citing the Leninist theory of nationalities, they proposed that Ireland contained two overlapping nations, Irish and British — or, as their position is sometimes characterised, a "nation and a bit": an Irish nation and part of the British nation. The contrarian left tendency formed the Workers' Association for the Democratic Settlement of the National Conflict in Ireland which called for an ending of the Republic's jurisdictional claim to Northern Ireland in Articles 2 and 3 of the Irish constitution (a concession later made under the 1998 Belfast Agreement). They also participated in campaigns to integrate Northern Ireland into the party-political democracy of the British state, targeting, in particular, the Labour Party's policy of refusing, in deference to its "sister" party, the nationalist SDLP, to organise and canvas Northern Irish voters.

The B&ICO's two nations argument was taken up in Ireland: Divided Nation, Divided Class (1980) by the Ulster Unionist Austen Morgan and the Anti-Internment League organiser Bob Purdie. As an academic, a member in the early 1970s of the Vanguard Unionist Progressive Party and later the Ulster Unionist leader who negotiated the Belfast Agreement, David Trimble also cited the B&ICO's two-nations interpretation of modern Irish history and subsequent critique of Irish nationalism.

Jim Kemmy, TD in the nineties for the Democratic Socialist Party, was influenced by the same ideas. Writing for the Sunday Press and Irish Times, and in a pamphlet, Towards a Greater Ulster (1973), the Irish nationalist Desmond Fennell also suggested that, while not a nation in themselves, Ulster Protestants were a separate ethnic group – the Ulster British – that had not been absorbed into the Irish nation. The solution to the conflict lay in a joint administration of Northern Ireland by the UK and Irish governments.

The commentary of Conor Cruise O'Brien on the Northern Ireland crisis, especially in his book States of Ireland (1973), has also been characterised as a two-nations analysis. In 1990, defending an exponent of the position against a charge of unionist "propaganda"', O'Brien noted that in 1972 a survey of his fellow Dubliners found 45 per cent endorsing the two-nations hypothesis. Citing both John Bright and Michael O'Flanagan, John Bruton, former leader of Fine Gael and taoiseach, has argued that nationalists cannot assume, a priori, an all-Ireland people with a right to self determination. Rather it is a project they must work toward, and one for which simply repeating the call for a united Ireland, "seen as patriotic and popular in the Republic", may be counter-productive.

A variation of the two-nation perspective was discussed in Queen's Rebels: Ulster Loyalism in Historical Perspective (1983) by the American scholar David Miller. He argued that while there was a nation in Ireland, comprising the Catholic majority, the Protestant Loyalists of Ulster are a distinct community bound by an older, "pre-nationalist", constitutional tradition. While the former accepted that it was "natural and inevitable for the nation-state to enjoy the willing adherence of all" its citizens, the latter adhered to a, Calvinist/Presbyterian reinforced, contractarian understanding of their relationship to the British Crown and constitution. This has contributed to their political alienation as successive British governments, seeking accommodation with Irish nationalism, failed, in their view, to uphold the provisions of the Acts of Union and of the Government of Ireland Act 1920.

== Ulster nationalism ==
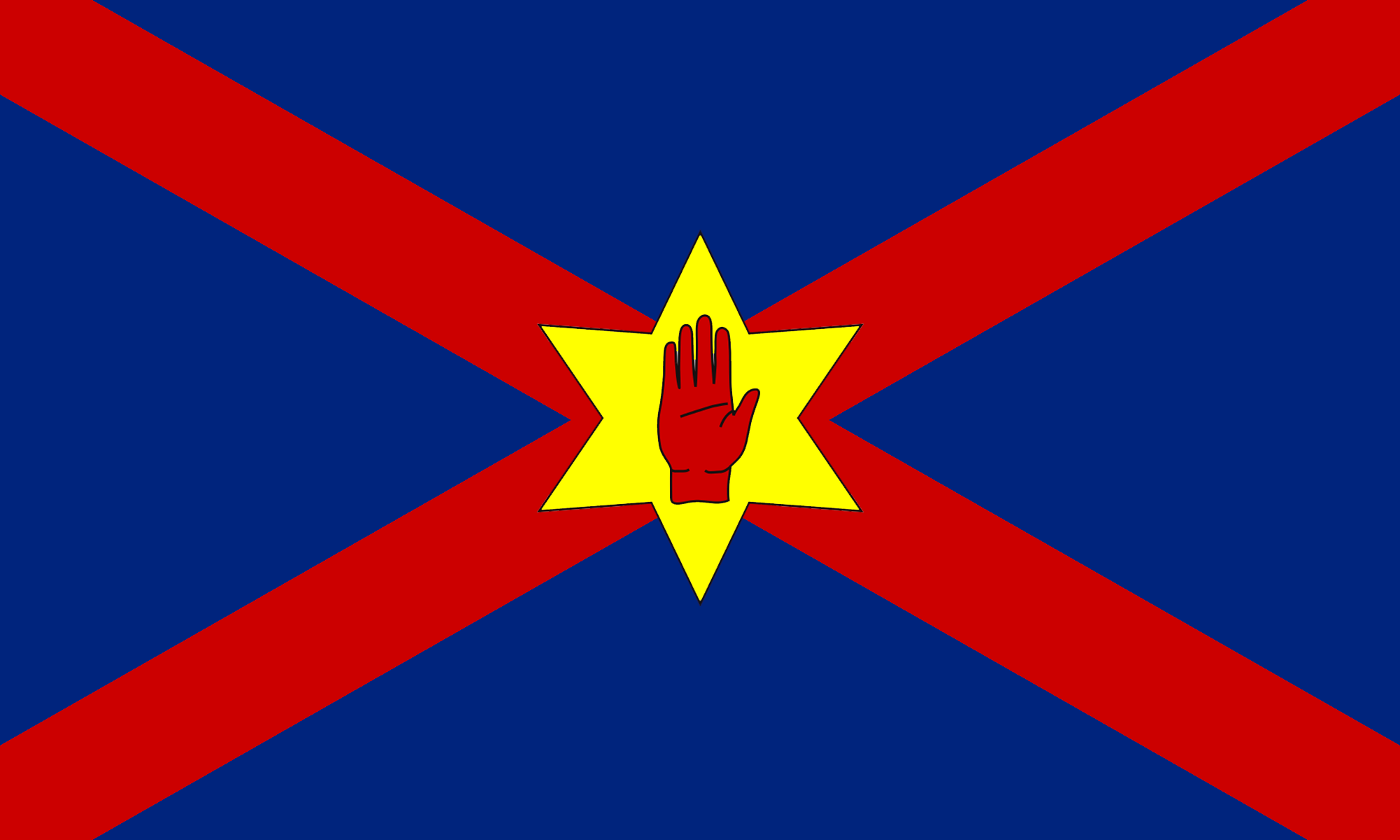
The cross of St. Patrick superimposed on the Scottish Saltire with a six-county star, Red Hand of Ulster and no crown: the "Ulster national flag" variously employed by Loyalist groups to represent an independent, or distinctly Ulster-Scot, Northern-Ireland identity.

Following the 1972 suspension of the Parliament of Northern Ireland, Glenn Barr, a Vanguard Assemblyman and Ulster Defence Association leader, advanced the idea of an independent Ulster. After the successful Ulster Workers Council Strike in 1974, which Barr had helped direct, the Secretary of State for Northern Ireland, Merlyn Rees, concluded that the resistance to the Sunningdale reforms (a power-sharing Northern Ireland executive and a Council of Ireland) demonstrated the existence of an "Ulster protestant nationalism".

The idea that people in Ulster have a national identity that is separate from, but attached to, their British and their Irish, identities, was provided its own origin myth with an historical narrative that invoked "pre-Celtic" Ireland. The Ulster Unionist, Dr Ian Adamson's maintained that Ulster Scots were descendants of the Cruthin, a British people who in the seventh century had been driven across the water to Scotland by Irish Gaels invading Ulster from the south, and who had returned to their ancestral lands a thousand years later in the Plantation of Ulster. Disputing evidence for a "Gaelic invasion", and for a distinct Cruthin ethnicity, Adamson's theory has been widely rejected by historians, archaeologists and anthropologists.

The B&ICO, which had lent critical support to the 1974 strike, rejected the idea of an Ulster nationalism out of hand. It was a confection, they suggested, deliberately promoted by Rees and other British policymakers keen to disengage from the troubled province.

Proposals for an independent Ulster were produced in 1976 by the Ulster Loyalist Central Co-ordinating Committee, and in 1979 by the UDA's New Ulster Political Research Group in a report, Beyond the Religious Divide. But the idea of independence gained no traction when trialed by the UDA-linked Ulster Loyalist Democratic Party in a 1982 South Belfast by-election. A short-lived Ulster Independence Party also operated, but did not survive the assassination of its leader, John McKeague in 1982. The idea enjoyed a further brief revival in the aftermath of the Anglo-Irish Agreement, with the loyalist Ulster Clubs amongst those who considered the notion.

== Ulster-Scots ==
Scholars have persisted in arguing that there is at at least the outline of a "third nation" in Northern Ireland. They find that there are strands of an Ulster Protestant identity which, if not sufficient to sustain an overt Ulster nationalism, are as resistant to full political integration with Great Britain, as they are to the prospect of Irish unity. In what he describes as a "process of ethnicising the Protestants of Ulster", sociologist Peter Gardner finds these coalescing around Ulster Scots (a narrative and language that Adamson had proposed "specifically as a way to counter Irish nationalism's claims in relation to origins, primary possession, indigeneity, and colonial dispossession").

In their contributions to the bicentennial of the 1798 rebellion, Gardner notes that the new-formed Ulster Scots Agency (Tha Boord o Ulstèr-Scotch) presented the Presbyterians of Ulster as having been, while not their equal in dispossession and exclusion under as the British Crown and Anglican ascendancy, in advance of Catholics in their demand for equal rights and democratic reform. They are thus reimagined as a "disenfranchised and indignant" community "outside of the bounds of colonial power in Ireland", rather than, as they appear in the traditional Irish nationalist historiography, "its custodians". An Ulster identity is curated that is Protestant-centric but not reduced to the unionist celebration of British loyalties.

While census questions on identity permit respondents more than one option, it appears that the great majority of Protestants in Northern Ireland identify primarily as British, and in greater numbers than was the case before the Troubles when, notwithstanding their unionism, one in five described themselves as Irish. Today, the popular alternative, or supplemental, identity for Protestants is Northern Irish. Whether any part of this suggests an ethnic consciousness, there are prominent unionists, insistent on an unadulterated Britishness, who profess themselves alert to the danger of "ethnic special pleading". The risk, they argue, is to define unionist culture as "subaltern and therefore ripe for absorption into Irish culture as a 'cherished' minor tradition".

In 2022, the UK Government formally recognised Ulster Scots as a national minority under the Council of Europe Framework Convention for the Protection of National Minorities (a treaty whose provisions were previously applied in Northern Ireland to Irish Travellers and to Roma). The government was delivering on the 2020 New Decade, New Approach agreement which served as the basis for the recommitment of the Democratic Unionist Party and of Sinn Féin to a devolved Northern Ireland Executive.

== See also ==
- People of Northern Ireland
- Irish People
- Ulster nationalism
- Unionism in Ireland: "The Ulster Option: 1905-1920", "Unionism as a Minority Bloc".
- Partitionism
- Two-nation theory (India)
