= 2018 All-Ireland Senior Ladies' Football Championship =

All-Ireland Senior Ladies' Football Championship 2018
Championship details
- Dates: 2 June – 16 September 2018
- Teams: 12

All-Ireland champions
- Winners: Dublin (3rd win)
- Captain: Sinéad Aherne
- Manager: Mick Bohan

All Ireland Runners-up
- Runners-up: Cork
- Captain: Ciara O'Sullivan
- Manager: Ephie Fitzgerald

Provincial champions
- Connacht: Galway
- Leinster: Dublin
- Munster: Cork
- Ulster: Donegal

Championship Statistics
- Matches Played: 27

The 2018 All-Ireland Senior Ladies' Football Championship was the 45th edition of the Ladies' Gaelic Football Association's premier inter-county Ladies' Gaelic Football tournament. It was known for sponsorship reasons as the TG4 All-Ireland Senior Ladies' Football Championship.

It was won by Dublin.

== Competition format ==
=== Provincial championships ===
Connacht, Leinster, Munster and Ulster each organise their provincial championship. All matches are knockout.

=== All-Ireland ===
Group stage

In 2018, a new round-robin format was introduced in the All-Ireland championship. The 12 teams are drawn into four groups of three teams.

Knockout stage

The winners of each group and the runners-up compete in the four All-Ireland quarter-finals. Two semi-finals and a final follow.

== Provincial championships ==
=== Connacht Championship ===
==== Connacht Final ====
| 24 June 2018; 4:00 pm Final | Mayo | 1-12 – 0-17 | Galway | MacHale Park; Referee: Gerry Carmody (Roscommon); Man of the Match: Tracey Leonard (Corofin) |
| 24 June 2018; 4:00 pm Final | Cora Staunton 0-6 (0-4f), Fiona Doherty 1-0, Sinead Cafferky, Niamh Kelly, Grace Kelly (0-1f) 0-2 each | Report | Tracey Leonard 0-6 (0-2f), Mairead Seoighe and Roisin Leonard (0-1f) 0-3 each, Emer Faherty, Nicola Ward, Olivia Divilly, Aine McDonagh, Sarah Conneally 0-1 each | MacHale Park; Referee: Gerry Carmody (Roscommon); Man of the Match: Tracey Leonard (Corofin) |

=== Leinster Championship ===
==== Leinster Final ====
| 1 July 2018; 4:00 pm Final | Dublin | 5-11 – 2-8 | Westmeath | Dr. Cullen Park; Referee: Stephen McNulty (Wicklow); Man of the Match: Niamh McEvoy (St. Sylvesters) |
| 1 July 2018; 4:00 pm Final | Sinéad Aherne 1-5 (0-3f), Niamh McEvoy 2-1, Noëlle Healy 1-2, Lyndsey Davey 1-0, Nicole Owens, Hannah O'Neill, Amy Connolly 0-1 each | Report | Leanne Slevin 1-3 (1-0 pen, 0-1f), Aoife Connolly 1-2 (0-2f), Annie Dolan, Maud Annie Foley, Johanna Maher 0-1 each | Dr. Cullen Park; Referee: Stephen McNulty (Wicklow); Man of the Match: Niamh McEvoy (St. Sylvesters) |

=== Munster Championship ===
==== Munster Semi-Finals ====
| 2 June 2018; Semi-Final | Cork | 2-12 - 1-10 | Tipperary | Ardfinnan GAA; Referee: Seamus Mulvihill (Kerry) |
| 2 June 2018; Semi-Final | Orla Finn 0-4 (3f), Brid O'Sullivan and Hannah Looney (1-0 pen) 1-0 each, Ciara O’Sullivan, Doireann O’Sullivan, Eimear Scally 0-2 each, Orlagh Farmer and Libby Coppinger 0-1 each | Report | Aisling Moloney 1-2, Aisling McCarthy 0-4 (3f), Mairead Morrissey 0-2, Orla O’Dwyer and Roisin Howard 0-1 each | Ardfinnan GAA; Referee: Seamus Mulvihill (Kerry) |

| 3 June 2018; Semi-Final | Kerry | 2-16 - 1-6 | Waterford | Fitzgerald Stadium, Killarney; Referee: Jason Mullins (Limerick) |
| 3 June 2018; Semi-Final | Sarah Houlihan 1-9 (1-0 pen, 0-3f), Andrea Murphy 1-2, Lorraine Scanlon 0-3 (0-1f), Emma Dineen and Aoife O'Callaghan 0-1 each | Report | Maria Delahunty 1-2, Michelle Ryan, Lauren McGregor (0-1f), Aileen Wall, Eimear Fennell (0-1f) 0-1 each | Fitzgerald Stadium, Killarney; Referee: Jason Mullins (Limerick) |

==== Munster Final ====
| 23 June 2018; 2:00 pm Final | Cork | 5-13 – 2-10 | Kerry | Cork IT; Referee: T Fox (Tipperary); Man of the Match: Melissa Duggan (Dohenys) |
| 23 June 2018; 2:00 pm Final | Saoirse Noonan 2-2 (1-0 pen), Ciara O'Sullivan 2-0, Hannah Looney 1-0 pen, Áine O'Sullivan 0-4, Orla Finn 0-3, Doireann O'Sullivan 0-2, Aisling Hutchings and Libby Coppinger 0-1 each | Report | Sarah Houlihan 1-4 (0-3f), Amy Foley 1-2, Lorraine Scanlon (0-1f), Emma Dineen, Brid Ryan, Kate O'Sullivan 0-1 each | Cork IT; Referee: T Fox (Tipperary); Man of the Match: Melissa Duggan (Dohenys) |

=== Ulster Championship ===
==== Ulster Semi-Finals ====
| 3 June 2018; 6:00 pm Semi-Final | Armagh | 2-14 - 1-14 | Cavan | Inniskeen Grattans GAC, Inniskeen; Referee: Gavin Corrigan (Down) |
| 3 June 2018; 6:00 pm Semi-Final | Aimee Mackin 1-4, Kelly Mallon 1-2 (0-1f), Caroline O'Hanlon 0-4 (0-2f), Tiarna Grimes and Lauren McConville 0-2 each | Report | Aisling Doonan 0-6 (0-3f), Donna English 0-4, Beth Farrelly McGee 1-0, Bronagh Sheridan and Aishling Sheridan 0-2 each | Inniskeen Grattans GAC, Inniskeen; Referee: Gavin Corrigan (Down) |

| 9 June 2018; 7:00 pm Semi-Final | Donegal | 3-17 - 1-9 | Monaghan | Healy Park, Omagh; Referee: Brendan Rice (Down) |
| 9 June 2018; 7:00 pm Semi-Final | Geraldine McLaughlin 1-5 (0-5f), Yvonne Bonner 1-2, Eilish Ward 1-1 (1-0 pen), Aoife McDonnell 0-3, Katy Herron and Sarah Jane McDonald 0-2 each, Deirdre Foley and Roisin Friel 0-1 each | Report | Ellen McCarron 0-5 (0-3f), Niamh Callan 1-0, Muireann Atkinson (0-1f), Rosemary Courtney, Therese Scott (0-1f), Eva Woods 0-1 each | Healy Park, Omagh; Referee: Brendan Rice (Down) |

==== Ulster Final ====
| 17 June 2018; 3:45 pm Final | Donegal | 9-21 – 4-8 | Armagh | Brewster Park; Referee: Brian McCallion (Tyrone); Man of the Match: Yvonne Bonner (Glenfin) |
| 17 June 2018; 3:45 pm Final | Yvonne Bonner 3-6, Geraldine McLaughlin 3-4 (0-1f), Eilish Ward 1-2, Karen Guthrie and Niamh Hegarty 1-1 each, Katy Herron 0-4, Sarah Jane McDonald 0-2, Aoife McDonnell 0-1 | Report | Caroline O'Hanlon 1-3 (1-0 pen), Aimee Mackin 1-2 (1-0 pen, 0-2f), Kelly Mallon and Blaithin Mackin 1-1 each, Aoife McCoy 0-1 | Brewster Park; Referee: Brian McCallion (Tyrone); Man of the Match: Yvonne Bonner (Glenfin) |

== All-Ireland Group Stage ==
=== All-Ireland Group Stage ===
In 2018, a new round-robin format was introduced in the All-Ireland championship. The 12 teams are drawn into four groups of three teams, with each group containing one provincial champion, one provincial beaten finalist, and one beaten provincial semi-finalist (two each from Munster and Ulster). Each team plays the other teams in its group once.

There are three rounds in each group with the provincial champions playing in rounds two and three. Three group points are awarded for a win and one for a draw. The winners and runners-up in each group compete in the four All-Ireland quarter-finals.

==== Group 1 ====
| Team | Pld | W | D | L | Group Points | Score Difference |
|---|---|---|---|---|---|---|
| Donegal | 2 | 2 | 0 | 0 | 6 | +4 |
| Kerry | 2 | 1 | 0 | 1 | 3 | +5 |
| Tipperary | 2 | 0 | 0 | 2 | 0 | –9 |

| 14 July 2018; 13:00 | Tipperary | 2-10 – 3-13 | Kerry | MacDonagh Park, Nenagh; Referee: Jonathan Murphy |
| 14 July 2018; 13:00 | A Moloney 1-4, R Howard 1-1, A McCarthy 0-3 (1f), G O’Brien 0-2 | Report | S Houlihan 2-3 (0-2f), L Ni Mhuircheartaigh 0-6 (3f), A Murphy 1-1, E O’Leary 0-2, A Brosnan 0-1 | MacDonagh Park, Nenagh; Referee: Jonathan Murphy |

| 21 July 2018; 3 p.m. | Donegal | 0-17 – 0-14 | Tipperary | Castlerea St. Kevin's GAA, Castlerea; Referee: Garryowen McMahon (Mayo) |
| 21 July 2018; 3 p.m. | | Report | | Castlerea St. Kevin's GAA, Castlerea; Referee: Garryowen McMahon (Mayo) |

| 28 July 2018 | Kerry | 1-13 – 3-6 | Donegal | Dr Hyde Park, Roscommon; Referee: Gerry Carmody |
| 28 July 2018 | | Report | | Dr Hyde Park, Roscommon; Referee: Gerry Carmody |

==== Group 2 ====
| Team | Pld | W | D | L | Group Points | Score Difference |
|---|---|---|---|---|---|---|
| Cork | 2 | 2 | 0 | 0 | 6 | +28 |
| Armagh | 2 | 0 | 1 | 1 | 1 | –12 |
| Monaghan | 2 | 0 | 1 | 1 | 1 | –16 |

| 14 July 2018; 12:30 | Armagh | 1-11 – 1-11 | Monaghan | Clones |
| 14 July 2018; 12:30 | | Report | | Clones |

| 21 July 2018; 15:00 | Cork | 7-7 – 1-9 | Monaghan | St Brendan's Park, Birr; Referee: Stephen McNulty (Wicklow) |
| 21 July 2018; 15:00 | C O’Sullivan 2-1; S Noonan 2-0; O Finn 0-5 (2f); A O’Sullivan 1-1; D O’Sullivan, M O’Callaghan 1-0 each. | Report | E McCarron 0-5 (3f); L Martin 1-0 (pen); C McAnespie 0-2; R Courtney, E Woods 0-1 each | St Brendan's Park, Birr; Referee: Stephen McNulty (Wicklow) |

| 28 July 2018; 3:45 p.m. | Armagh | 1-7 – 1-19 | Cork | Duggan Park, Ballinasloe; Referee: Gus Chapman (Sligo) |
| 28 July 2018; 3:45 p.m. | | Report | | Duggan Park, Ballinasloe; Referee: Gus Chapman (Sligo) |

==== Group 3 ====
| Team | Pld | W | D | L | Group Points | Score Difference |
|---|---|---|---|---|---|---|
| Galway | 2 | 2 | 0 | 0 | 6 | +42 |
| Westmeath | 2 | 1 | 0 | 1 | 3 | –25 |
| Waterford | 2 | 0 | 0 | 2 | 0 | –17 |

| 14 July 2018; 14:45 | Waterford | 2-11 – 2-12 | Westmeath | MacDonagh Park, Nenagh; Referee: John Gallagher |
| 14 July 2018; 14:45 | A Wall 2-0, M Delahunty 0-6 (4f), K Corbett Barry 0-1, M Ryan 0-1, Kate McGrath 0-1, S Ryan 0-1, E Fennell 0-1 | Report | A Connolly 1-2 (0-1f), L Slevin 0-5 (5f), L L Walsh 1-0, M A Foley 0-3, A Dolan 0-2 | MacDonagh Park, Nenagh; Referee: John Gallagher |

| 21 July 2018; 16:45 | Galway | 3-12 – 0-5 | Waterford | St Brendan's Park, Birr; Referee: Seamus Mulvihill |

| 28 July 2018; 2 p.m. | Westmeath | 1-6 – 6-17 | Galway | Duggan Park, Ballinasloe; Referee: Kevin Corcoran |
| 28 July 2018; 2 p.m. | A Connolly 1-2 (0-2f), LL Walsh 0-1, J Maher 0-1, F Coyle 0-1, MA Foley 0-1. | Report | L Coen 2-3, T Leonard 0-6 (2f), S Conneally 1-2, R Leonard 1-2, E Reaney 1-1, L Ward 1-0, A Davoren 0-1, O Divilly 0-1, A McDonagh 0-1 | Duggan Park, Ballinasloe; Referee: Kevin Corcoran |

==== Group 4 ====
| Team | Pld | W | D | L | Group Points | Score Difference |
|---|---|---|---|---|---|---|
| Dublin | 2 | 2 | 0 | 0 | 6 | +22 |
| Mayo | 2 | 1 | 0 | 1 | 3 | –2 |
| Cavan | 2 | 0 | 0 | 2 | 0 | –20 |

| 14 July 2018; 14:15 | Mayo | 3-23 - 4-13 | Cavan | Clones; Referee: Niall McCormack (Laois); Man of the Match: Grace Kelly (Moy Davitts) |
| 14 July 2018; 14:15 | Grace Kelly 2-6 (0-1f), Sarah Rowe 1-7, Niamh Kelly 0-5, Fiona Doherty 0-3, Kathryn Sullivan and Emma Needham 0-1 each | Report | Aisling Maguire 1-5 (0-4f), Donna English, Catherine Dolan, Aishling Sheridan 1-0 each, Bronagh Sheridan 0-3 (0-1f), Sinead Greene 0-2, Catriona Smith, Ciara Finnegan, Roisin O'Keefe 0-1 each | Clones; Referee: Niall McCormack (Laois); Man of the Match: Grace Kelly (Moy Davitts) |

| 21 July 2018; 3 pm | Dublin | 5-17 – 2-13 | Cavan | Dunleer; Referee: Brendan Rice |
| 21 July 2018; 3 pm | Noëlle Healy 2-5; L McGinley 2-0; Niamh McEvoy 1-2; Sinéad Aherne 0-3 (2f); O Whyte 0-2; N Collins, J Dunne, C Rowe, N Owens, Niamh McEvoy 0-1 each | Report | A Maguire 0-8 (5f); Aishling Sheridan 1-2; C Dolan 1-0; A O’Reilly, C Smith, S Greene 0-1 each | Dunleer; Referee: Brendan Rice |

| 28 July 2018 | Mayo | 1-8 – 3-11 | Dublin | Dr. Hyde Park, Roscommon; Referee: Maggie Farrelly (Cavan) |
| 28 July 2018 | | Report | | Dr. Hyde Park, Roscommon; Referee: Maggie Farrelly (Cavan) |

== All-Ireland Knockout ==
=== All-Ireland Quarter-Finals ===
Each of the four winners from the group stage play one of the four runners-up.

4 August 2018
16:00 IST (UTC+1)
Quarter-Final 1

Report

| Donegal | 0-19 (19) – (16) 1-13 | Armagh |
|---|---|---|
(HT: 0-11 – 0-05)
| Pts: Y Bonner 5; G McLaughlin 4 (1f); S J McDonald, E Ward 3; N Hegarty 2, A McDonnell 2; K Herron 1. | | Gls: A McCoy 1 Pts: A Mackin 7 (2f); C O’Hanlon 2, K Mallon 1 (f); B Mackin, S Grey, A McCoy 1 |

Healy Park, Omagh
Referee: Brendan Rice (Down)

TG4

6 August 2018
16:45 IST (UTC+1)
Quarter-Final 2

Report

| Cork | 8-18 (42) – (9) 1-06 | Westmeath |
|---|---|---|
(HT: 3-05 – 0-03)

Gaelic Grounds, Limerick
Referee: Seamus Mulvihill

TG4 Player

12 August 2018
15:00 IST (UTC+1)
Quarter-Final 3

| Galway | 5-11 (26) – (12) 0-12 | Mayo |
|---|---|---|
(HT: 3-06 – 0-06)

Dr. Hyde Park, Roscommon
Referee: Niall McCormack

TG4

12 August 2018
17:00 IST (UTC+1)
Quarter-Final 4

Report

| Dublin | 3-19 (28) – (10) 1-07 | Kerry |
|---|---|---|
(HT: 0-09 – 1-03)

Dr. Hyde Park, Roscommon
Referee: Garryowen McMahon (Mayo)

=== All-Ireland Semi-Finals ===
TG4

25 August 2018
14:45 IST (UTC+1)
Semi-Final 1

Report

| Cork | 2-11 (17) – (11) 0-11 | Donegal |
|---|---|---|
(HT: 1-06 – 0-05)

Dr. Hyde Park, Roscommon
Referee: Brendan Rice (Down)

TG4

25 August 2018
16:30 IST (UTC+1)
Semi-Final 2

Report

| Dublin | 4-08 (20) – (13) 1-10 | Galway |
|---|---|---|
(HT: 3-05 – 0-03)

Dr. Hyde Park, Roscommon
Referee: Seamus Mulvihill (Kerry)

=== All-Ireland final ===
16 September 2018
16:00 IST (UTC+1)

| Dublin | 3-11; 1-12 | Cork |
|---|---|---|
| Sinéad Aherne (1-7); Carla Rowe (2-0); Nicole Owens (0-2); Niamh McEvoy (0-1); Sinéad Goldrick (0-1) | | Orla Finn (0-8); Áine Kelly (1-1); Ciara O'Sullivan (0-2); Doireann O'Sullivan (0-1) |

Croke Park, Dublin
Attendance: 50,141
Referee: Garryowen McMahon (Mayo)

== Relegation play-offs ==
=== Relegation Format ===
The provincial championship winners are exempt from relegation even if they finish bottom of their group. The number of relegation play-off games is therefore dependent on the number of non provincial winners who finish bottom of their group. The losers of the relegation play-offs play in next year's intermediate championship.

=== Relegation qualifiers ===
11 August 2018
Relegation Qualifier 1

Report

| Tipperary | 1-13 (16) – (22) 3-13 | Waterford |
|---|---|---|
(HT: 1-08 – 2-08)

John Locke Park, Callan
Referee: J Murphy (Carlow)

11 August 2018
Relegation Qualifier 2

Report

| Monaghan | 2-15 (21) – (15) 0-15 | Cavan |
|---|---|---|
(HT: 1-07 – 0-07)

Lann Léire GFC, Dunleer
Referee: Kieran McKeever

=== Relegation play-off Match ===
18 August 2018
13:00 IST (UTC+1)
Relegation Play-Off

Report

| Tipperary | 1-14 (17) – (20) 2-14 | Cavan |
|---|---|---|
(HT: 1-09 – 0-04)

Dolan Park, Virginia
Referee: John Gallagher

Tipperary are relegated to the All-Ireland Intermediate Ladies' Football Championship for 2019.

== Records ==
=== Scoring Events ===
- Widest winning margin: 33 points
  - Cork 8-18 – 1-6 Westmeath (All-Ireland Quarter-Final)
- Most goals in a match: 13
  - Donegal 9-21 – 4-8 Armagh (Ulster final)
- Most points in a match: 36
  - Mayo 3-23 – 4-13 Cavan (group stage)
- Most goals by one team in a match: 9
  - Donegal 9-21 – 4-8 Armagh (Ulster final)
- Most goals by a losing team: 4
  - Donegal 9-21 – 4-8 Armagh (Ulster final)
  - Mayo 3-23 – 4-13 Cavan (group stage)
- Highest aggregate score: 68 points
  - Donegal 9-21 – 4-8 Armagh (Ulster final)
- Lowest aggregate score: 28 points
  - Cork 2-11 – 0-11 Donegal (All-Ireland Semi-Final)

== See also ==
- 2018 All-Ireland Intermediate Ladies' Football Championship
