= 2019 All-Ireland Senior Ladies' Football Championship =

All-Ireland Senior Ladies' Football Championship 2019
Championship details
- Dates: 11 May – 15 September 2019
- Teams: 12

All-Ireland champions
- Winners: Dublin (4th win)
- Captain: Sinéad Aherne
- Manager: Mick Bohan

All Ireland Runners-up
- Runners-up: Galway
- Captain: Tracey Leonard
- Manager: Tim Rabbitt

Provincial champions
- Connacht: Galway
- Leinster: Dublin
- Munster: Cork
- Ulster: Donegal

Championship Statistics
- Matches Played: 29

The 2019 All-Ireland Senior Ladies' Football Championship is the 46th edition of the Ladies' Gaelic Football Association's premier inter-county Ladies' Gaelic Football tournament. It is known for sponsorship reasons as the TG4 All-Ireland Senior Ladies' Football Championship.

It was won by Dublin, who defeated Galway in the final.

== Competition format ==
=== Provincial championships ===
Connacht, Leinster and Ulster each organise their provincial championship. All matches are knockout.

In Munster there are three teams in the provincial championship. They play each other in a round-robin phase, with two teams progressing to the final.

=== All-Ireland ===
Group stage

The 12 teams are drawn into four groups of three teams.

Knockout stage

The winners of each group and the runners-up compete in the four All-Ireland quarter-finals. Two semi-finals and a final follow.

== Provincial championships ==
=== Connacht Championship ===
==== Connacht Final ====
23 June 2019; 16:00 IST; Final	Mayo	3-6 – 1-12	Galway	MacHale Park, Castlebar; Referee: John Niland (Sligo)
23 June 2019; 16:00 IST; Final	R Kearns 1-2; É Ronayne, G Kelly 1-0 each; Sarah Rowe 0-2 (2f); S Cafferky 0-1, N Kelly 0-1.	Report	T Leonard 0-6 (4f), L Ward 1-0, S Conneally 0-2, A McDonagh 0-1, R Leonard 0-1 (1f), O Divilly 0-1, M Glynn 0-1	MacHale Park, Castlebar; Referee: John Niland (Sligo)

==== Connacht Final Replay ====
6 July 2019; 16:00 IST; Final Replay	Mayo	0-9 – 3-7	Galway	Gaelic Grounds, Limerick; Referee: John Niland (Sligo)
6 July 2019; 16:00 IST; Final Replay	Sarah Rowe 0-03, Grace Kelly 0-03, Sinead Cafferky 0-01, Clodagh McManamon 0-01, Rachel Kearns 0-01	Report	T Leonard (2-03), M Glynn (1-00); R Leonard (0-02), S Conneally (0-01), L Hannon (0-01)	Gaelic Grounds, Limerick; Referee: John Niland (Sligo)

=== Leinster Championship ===
==== Leinster Final ====
30 June 2019; 16:00 IST; Final	Dublin	4-11 – 1-7	Westmeath	Dr. Cullen Park, Carlow; Referee: N McCormack (Laois)
30 June 2019; 16:00 IST; Final		Report		Dr. Cullen Park, Carlow; Referee: N McCormack (Laois)

=== Munster Championship ===
==== Group stage ====
Games take place on 11 May, 25 May, and 1 June 2019.

Team	Pld	W	D	L	Group Points	Score Difference
Cork	2	2	0	0	6	+40
Waterford	2	1	0	1	3	–19
Kerry	2	0	0	2	0	–21

==== Munster Final ====
16 June 2019; 18:30 IST; Final	Cork	2-14 – 0-9	Waterford	Fraher Field, Dungarvan; Referee: S Mulvihill (Kerry)
16 June 2019; 18:30 IST; Final	S Noonan 2-3, O Finn 0-4 (2f), D Kiely 0-2, N Cotter 0-2, E Kiely 0-1, C O'Sullivan 0-1, L Coppinger 0-1	Report	M Delahunty 0-5 (3f), K Murray 0-1, KA Hogan 0-1, C Fennell 0-1, M Ryan 0-1	Fraher Field, Dungarvan; Referee: S Mulvihill (Kerry)

=== Ulster Championship ===
==== Ulster Round 1 ====
8 June 2019; Round 1	Donegal	3-13 – 2-12	Tyrone	Breffni Park, Cavan
8 June 2019; Round 1		Report		Breffni Park, Cavan

==== Ulster Semi-Finals ====
9 June 2019; 15:45 IST; Semi-Final	Armagh	5-14 – 1-12	Monaghan	Athletic Grounds, Armagh; Referee: Yvonne Duffy (Cavan)
9 June 2019; 15:45 IST; Semi-Final	A McCoy 2-1, K Mallon 0-5 (3f), B Mackin, N Reel 1-2 each, E Lavery 1-1, C O'Hanlon 0-2, A Mackin 0-1	Report	R Courtney 0-5 (4f), C Courtney 1-2 (1-0 pen), S Coyle 0-3, C Treanor 0-1, C McBride 0-1	Athletic Grounds, Armagh; Referee: Yvonne Duffy (Cavan)

15 June 2019; 19:00 IST; Semi-Final	Cavan	2-13 – 0-24; AET	Donegal	Killyclogher; Referee: K McKeever (Armagh)
15 June 2019; 19:00 IST; Semi-Final	A Maguire 1-6 (0-5f, 1-0 pen), C Finnegan 1-2 (0-1f), D English 0-3, E Longair 0-1, K McIntyre 0-1	Report	G McLaughlin 0-14 (3f), K Guthrie 0-8 (7f), A Boyle Carr 0-1, K Keeney 0-1	Killyclogher; Referee: K McKeever (Armagh)

==== Ulster Final ====
30 June 2019; 15:45 IST; Final	Armagh	1-9 – 5-12	Donegal	St. Tiernach's Park, Clones; Attendance: 2,049; Referee: Y Duffy (Cavan)
30 June 2019; 15:45 IST; Final	C O’Hanlon 1-3 (0-2f), A Mackin 0-4, K Mallon 0-1 (f), B Mackin 0-1	Report	G McLaughlin 2-4 (0-1f), Niamh McLaughlin 2-2, A Boyle Carr 1-2, K Guthrie 0-4 (3f)	St. Tiernach's Park, Clones; Attendance: 2,049; Referee: Y Duffy (Cavan)

== All-Ireland Group Stage ==
Key to colours
Advance to All-Ireland quarter-finals
Relegation playoffs
Exempt from relegation (provincial champions)

=== All-Ireland Group Stage ===
The 12 teams are drawn into four groups of three teams, with each group containing one provincial champion, one provincial finalist, and one other team.

Three group points are awarded for a win and one for a draw. The winners and runners-up in each group compete in the four All-Ireland quarter-finals.

Group games take place 13–28 July 2019.

==== Group 1 ====
Pos	Team	Pld	W	D	L	PF	PA	PD	Pts	Qualification
1	Cork	2	1	0	1	57	40	+17	3	Advance to Quarter-final
2	Armagh	2	1	0	1	47	47	0	3	Advance to Quarter-final
3	Cavan	2	1	0	1	46	63	−17	3	Relegation play-off

Updated to match(es) played on 27 July 2019. Source: The42.ie

13 July 2019 Round 1	Cavan	3-18 (27) – (26) 6-08	Armagh	Templeport
14:00 IST (UTC+1)				Venue: Templeport St Aidans GAA
		Report		Referee: Niall McCormack (Laois)

20 July 2019 Round 2	Cork	6-19 (37) – (19) 3-08	Cavan	Mullingar
				Venue: TEG Cusack Park
		Report		Referee: Gus Chapman (Sligo)

27 July 2019 Round 3	Armagh	4-09 (21) – (20) 3-11	Cork	Tullamore
15:15 IST (UTC+1)				Venue: O'Connor Park
		Report		Referee: Maggie Farrelly

==== Group 2 ====
Pos	Team	Pld	W	D	L	PF	PA	PD	Pts	Qualification
1	Dublin	2	2	0	0	59	16	+43	6	Advance to Quarter-final
2	Waterford	2	1	0	1	52	43	+9	3	Advance to Quarter-final
3	Monaghan	2	0	0	2	17	69	−52	0	Relegation play-off

Updated to match(es) played on 27 July 2019. Source: The42.ie

13 July 2019 Round 1	Waterford	2-06 (12) – (30) 5-15	Dublin	Portlaoise
15:30 IST (UTC+1)				Venue: O'Moore Park

20 July 2019 Round 2	Monaghan	1-10 (13) – (40) 7-19	Waterford	Cremartin
15:00 IST (UTC+1)				Venue: Shamrock Park
		Report		Referee: G Carmody (Sligo)

27 July 2019 Round 3	Dublin	3-20 (29) – (04) 0-04	Monaghan	Dublin
14:00 IST (UTC+1)				Venue: Parnell Park
		Report		Referee: Kevin Phelan (Laois)

==== Group 3 ====
Pos	Team	Pld	W	D	L	PF	PA	PD	Pts	Qualification
1	Galway	2	2	0	0	36	19	+17	6	Advance to Quarter-final
2	Kerry	2	1	0	1	28	30	−2	3	Advance to Quarter-final
3	Westmeath	2	0	0	2	19	34	−15	0	Relegation play-off

Updated to match(es) played on 28 July 2019. Source: RTÉ

13 July 2019 Round 1	Galway	1-14 (17) – (13) 1-10	Kerry	Portlaoise
13:45 IST (UTC+1)				Venue: O'Moore Park

21 July 2019 Round 2	Westmeath	1-03 (06) – (19) 2-13	Galway	Mullingar
13:00 IST (UTC+1)				Venue: TEG Cusack Park
		Report		Referee: Niall McCormack

28 July 2019 Round 3	Kerry	1-12 (15) – (13) 1-10	Westmeath	Killarney
14:00 IST (UTC+1)				Venue: Fitzgerald Stadium
		Report -->		Referee: Kevin Phelan

==== Group 4 ====
Pos	Team	Pld	W	D	L	PF	PA	PD	Pts	Qualification
1	Mayo	2	2	0	0	48	41	+7	6	Advance to Quarter-final
2	Tyrone	2	1	0	1	41	41	0	3	Advance to Quarter-final
3	Donegal	2	0	0	2	39	46	−7	0	Exempt from relegation

Updated to match(es) played on 27 July 2019. Source: The42.ie

13 July 2019 Round 1	Tyrone	3-11 (20) – (23) 3-14	Mayo	Omagh
14:00 IST (UTC+1)				Venue: Healy Park

20 July 2019 Round 2	Donegal	3-09 (18) – (21) 3-12	Tyrone	Mullingar
13:45 IST (UTC+1)				Venue: Cusack Park
		Report		Referee: Barry Redmond (Wexford)

27 July 2019 Round 3	Mayo	1-22 (25) – (21) 3-12	Donegal	Tullamore
13:30 IST (UTC+1)				Venue: O'Connor Park
		Report		Referee: Stephen McNulty (Wicklow)

== All-Ireland Knockout ==
=== All-Ireland Quarter-Finals ===
Each of the four winners from the group stage play one of the four runners-up.

Facebook Live

3 August 2019
15:00 IST
Quarter-Final 1

Report

Cork	7-18 (39) – (13) 3-04	Tyrone
(HT: 3-08 – 1-03)
Gls: D O’Sullivan 2, N Cotter 1, E Scally 1, E Kiely 1, Á O’Sullivan 1, S Noonan 1 Pts: O Finn 6 (4f), D O’Sullivan 2, N Cotter 2, E Scally 2, C O’Sullivan 2, E Kiely 1, Á O’Sullivan 1, R Ní Bhuachalla 1, A Hutchings 1		Gls: M Mallon 2, M Canavan 1 Pts: C McCaffrey 3, A McHugh 1

Duggan Park, Ballinasloe
Referee: Gerry Carmody (Roscommon)

TG4

5 August 2019
16:45 IST
Quarter-Final 2

Report

Dublin	5-15 (30) – (15) 2-09	Kerry
(HT: 1-04 – 2-03)
Gls: Sinéad Aherne 2, Niamh McEvoy 1, C Rowe 1, N Hetherton 1 Pts: Sinéad Aherne 5 (3f), Niamh McEvoy 2, C Rowe 1, O Whyte 2, K Sullivan 2, Sinéad Goldrick 1, N Healy 1, L Davey 1		Gls: S Houlihan 1, M O’Keeffe 1 Pts: S Houlihan 3 (1f), L Ní Mhuircheartaigh 3 (2f), M O’Keeffe 1, E Dineen 1, L Scanlon 1

O'Connor Park, Tullamore
Referee: Gus Chapman (Sligo)

TG4

10 August 2019
13:00 IST
Quarter-Final 4

Report

Mayo	2-12 (18) – (15) 1-12	Armagh
(HT: 1-07 – 0-07)
Gls: Sarah Rowe 1, M Reilly 1 Pts: Sarah Rowe 3 (2f), G Kelly 2, N Gaughan 1, Clodagh McManamon 1, R Kearns 1, N Kelly 1, S Cafferky 1, F Doherty 1, D Caldwell 1		Gls: K Mallon 1 Pts: Caroline O'Hanlon 7 (3f), C Marley 2, A McCoy 1, T Grimes 1, K Mallon 1f

Pearse Park, Longford
Referee: Jonathan Murphy (Carlow)

TG4

10 August 2019
14:45 IST
Quarter-Final 3

Report

Galway	1-12 (15) – (10) 2-04	Waterford
(HT: 1-06 – 1-04)
Gls: T Leonard 1 Pts: T Leonard 5 (3f), S Conneally 2, R Leonard 2, L Ward 1, M Glynn 1, Á McDonagh 1		Gls: A Wall 2 Pts: M Delahunty 2 (1f), M Ryan 2

Pearse Park, Longford
Referee: Brendan Rice

=== All-Ireland Semi-Finals ===
TG4

25 August 2019
14:00 IST
Semi-Final 2

Report

Galway	2-10 (16) – (15) 2-09	Mayo
(HT: 2-05 – 1-06)
Gls: M Seoighe 2 Pts: R Leonard 4 (1f), S Conneally 2, T Leonard 1f, M Glynn 1, M Seoighe 1, L Coen 1		Gls: R Kearns 1, N Kelly 1 Pts: G Kelly 3 (2f), R Kearns 2, N Kelly 1, Sarah Rowe 1f, N Gaughan 1f, S Cafferky 1

Croke Park, Dublin
Referee: Seamus Mulvihill (Kerry)
Attendance: 10,886

TG4

25 August 2019
15:45 IST
Semi-Final 1

Report

Cork	0-11 (11) – (17) 2-11	Dublin
(HT: 0-07 – 0-07)
Pts: O Finn 9 (8f), D O’Sullivan 1, E Scally 1		Gls: Sinéad Aherne 1pen, C O’Connor 1 Pts: Sinéad Aherne 3fs, C Rowe 3, L Davey 1, O Whyte 1, Niamh McEvoy 1, Noëlle Healy 1, J Dunne 1

Croke Park, Dublin
Referee: Maggie Farrelly (Cavan)
Attendance: 10,886

=== All-Ireland final ===
15 September 2019
16:00 IST

Dublin	2–3; 0–4	Galway
Sinéad Goldrick (1-0); Hannah O'Neill (1-0); Lyndsey Davey (0-1); Sinéad Aherne (0-1); Noëlle Healy (0-1)		Tracey Leonard (0-2); Sarah Conneally (0-1); Roisín Leonard (0-1)

Croke Park, Dublin
Attendance: 56,114
Referee: Brendan Rice (Down)

== Relegation play-offs ==
The last-placed team in each group contest the relegation playoffs. Note that the provincial champions are exempt from relegation, so Donegal did not have to take part.

The losers of the relegation play-offs play in the 2020 intermediate championship.

11 August 2019
15:45 IST
Relegation Semi-Final

Report

Cavan	3-12 (21) – (9) 1-06	Westmeath
(HT: 2-8 – 1-3)

Coralstown/Kinnegad GAA, Kinnegad
Referee: Kevin Corcoran (Mayo)

18 August 2019
14:00 IST
Relegation Final

Report

Westmeath	1-10 (13) – (27) 3-18	Monaghan
(HT: 0-04 – 1-13)
Gls: A Jones 1 Pts: L Slevin 7 (6f), A Jones 1, L McCartan 1, G Halligan 1		Gls: L Kerley 1, C Treanor 1, J Duffy 1 Pts: L Kerley 11 (9f), C Courtney 2, R Courtney 1, C Treanor 1, C McAnespie 1, C McBride 1, A McCarey 1

Lann Léire C.P.G., Dunleer
Referee: B Redmond (Wexford)

Westmeath are relegated to the All-Ireland Intermediate Ladies' Football Championship for 2020.
