= 2016 All-Ireland Senior Ladies' Football Championship =

All-Ireland Senior Ladies' Football Championship 2016
Championship details
- Dates: 14 May – 25 September 2016
- Teams: 13

All-Ireland champions
- Winners: Cork (11th win)
- Captain: Ciara O’Sullivan
- Manager: Ephie Fitzgerald

All Ireland Runners-up
- Runners-up: Dublin
- Captain: Noëlle Healy
- Manager: Gregory McGonigle

Provincial champions
- Connacht: Mayo
- Leinster: Dublin
- Munster: Cork
- Ulster: Monaghan

Championship Statistics
- Matches Played: 27

The 2016 All-Ireland Senior Ladies' Football Championship is the 43rd edition of the Ladies' Gaelic Football Association's premier inter-county Ladies' Gaelic Football tournament. It is known for sponsorship reasons as the TG4 All-Ireland Senior Ladies' Football Championship.

Cork were the defending champions and successfully defended their title beating Dublin in the final on 25 September 2016. The 2016 attendance of 34,445 was a new record.

== Format ==
Provincial Championships

Connacht, Leinster, Munster and Ulster each organise their provincial championship. Each province determines the format for deciding their champions and it may be league, group, knock-out, double-elimination, etc. or a combination. For clarity, the format is explained in the provincial sections below.

Qualifiers

All teams except the provincial champions enter the All-Ireland qualifiers. The final four qualifier winners re-enter the All-Ireland championship at the quarterfinal stage. All matches are knock-out.

All-Ireland

The four provincial champions play the four winners from the qualifiers in the All-Ireland quarterfinals with the winners progressing to the semifinals. The final is normally played on the fourth Sunday in September. All matches are knock-out.

== Provincial championships ==
=== Connacht Championship ===
==== Connacht Format ====
As only two teams enter, a knock-out final is played.

==== Connacht Final ====
3 July 2016
Final

Mayo	3-20 – 0-16	Galway
	Report

Castlebar
Referee: John Niland (Sligo)

=== Leinster Championship ===
==== Leinster Format ====
Four Leinster teams (Dublin, Laois, Meath and Westmeath) compete in an initial group stage. Each team plays all the other teams once in three rounds of two matches. The top two teams advance to the final.

==== Leinster Group Stage ====
===== Leinster Round 1 =====
- Dublin 3-15 – 0-4 Laois
- Meath 2-14 – 5-21 Westmeath

===== Leinster Round 2 =====
- Laois 3-6 – 2-9 Meath
- Westmeath 1-4 – 4-12 Dublin

===== Leinster Round 3 =====
- Laois 1-11 – 2-12 Westmeath
- Meath 2-4 – 3-19 Dublin

===== Table =====
1. Dublin (6 pts)
2. Westmeath (4)
3. Laois (1)
4. Meath (1)

==== Leinster Final ====
10 July 2016; 3:00 pm Final	Dublin	4-21 - 0-7	Westmeath	O'Moore Park; Referee: Colm McManus (Meath); Man of the Match: Nicole Owens (St. Sylvesters)
10 July 2016; 3:00 pm Final	Lyndsey Davey 1-4 (0-1f), Nicole Owens 0-6, Carla Rowe and Sinead Aherne (0-1f) 1-2 each, Sinéad Goldrick 1-1, Noëlle Healy 0-3, Ciara Trant (0-1f), Deirdre Murphy, Siobhan Woods 0-1 each	Report	Leona Archibald 0-4 (0-3f), Lucy McCartan, Fiona Claffey, Maud Annie Foley 0-1 each	O'Moore Park; Referee: Colm McManus (Meath); Man of the Match: Nicole Owens (St. Sylvesters)

=== Munster Championship ===
==== Munster Format ====
Three Munster teams (Cork, Kerry and Waterford) compete in an initial group stage. The top two teams advance to the final.

==== Munster Group Stage ====
10 June 2016
Group Match

Cork	1-10 - 0-7	Waterford

17 June 2016
Group Match

Kerry	2-14 - 2-9	Cork

29 June 2016
Group Match

Kerry	1-14 – 1-7	Waterford
	Report

Brosna

==== Munster Final ====
10 July 2016
Final

Cork	2-8 – 0-7	Kerry
	Report

Killarney

=== Ulster Championship ===
==== Ulster Format ====
Four teams compete in two semifinals and a final. All matches are knockout.

==== Ulster Semifinals ====
18 June 2016
Semifinal

Cavan	1-9 - 1-8	Donegal

18 June 2016
Semifinal

Armagh	2-4 - 3-17	Monaghan

Killyclogher

==== Ulster Final ====
3 July 2016
Final

Monaghan	0-14 - 1-8	Cavan

Killyclogher

== Qualifiers ==
=== Qualifiers Format ===
All the teams except the provincial champions enter the qualifiers. A preliminary round is held to reduce the number of teams to eight who then play four matches. All matches are knock-out.

The four winners play the four provincial champions in the All-Ireland quarterfinals.

=== Qualifiers Preliminary Round ===
23 July 2016
Preliminary round

Armagh	2-13 - 4-13	Waterford

Clane, Kildare

=== Qualifiers Last Eight ===
1 August 2016
15:00
Qualifier

Donegal	3-15 - 4-11	Galway

Pearse Park, Longford

1 August 2016
13:30
Qualifier

Meath	1-4 - 3-20	Westmeath

Cusack Park, Mullingar

6 August 2016
14:00
Qualifier

Cavan	1-15 - 1-13	Laois

Birr, Offaly

6 August 2016
15:45
Qualifier

Kerry	3-19 - 3-10	Waterford

Birr, Offaly

== All-Ireland ==
=== All-Ireland Quarterfinals ===
The four provincial champions play the four winners from the qualifiers.

13 August 2016
3:15 pm
Quarterfinal

Mayo	2-10 - 1-11	Westmeath

Pearse Park, Longford

13 August 2016
5:00 pm
Quarterfinal

Dublin	1-13 – 2-7	Donegal
Sinéad Aherne 1-6 (3f), C Rowe 0-3, Niamh McEvoy 0-2, S Woods and Lyndsey Davey 0-1 each	Report	K Guthrie 0-4 (4f), Y McMonagle 1-1 (1f), G McLaughlin 1-0, A Barrett and K Herron 0-1 each

Pearse Park, Longford
Referee: G Chapman (Sligo)

20 August 2016
12:30 pm
Quarterfinal

Cork	3-17 - 1-3	Cavan

Birr

20 August 2016
2:15 pm
Quarterfinal

Monaghan	6-17 - 1-16	Kerry

Birr, Offaly

=== All-Ireland Semifinals ===
27 August 2016
6:30 pm
Semifinal

Mayo	1-12 - 2-10	Dublin

Breffni Park, Cavan

3 September 2016
5:00 pm
Semifinal

Cork	2-10 - 1-10	Monaghan

Gaelic Grounds, Limerick

=== All-Ireland final ===
25 September 2016

Cork	1-7; 1-6	Dublin
Rhona Ní Bhuachalla (1-0); Doireann O'Sullivan (0-3); Orla Finn (0-3); Orlagh Farmer (0-1)		Sinéad Aherne (1-3); Niamh McEvoy (0-1); Noëlle Healy (0-1); Lyndsey Davey (0-1)

Croke Park, Dublin
Attendance: 34,445
Referee: Brendan Rice (Down)
