= Jennifer Dunne (footballer) =

Gaelic football player

Personal information
- Born: 13 December 1999 (age 26)
- Original team: Dublin (Ladies' Gaelic football)
- Draft: Rookie signing, 2023 supplementary
- Debut: Round 3, 2023, Brisbane vs. Sydney, at Springfield Central Stadium
- Height: 178 cm (5 ft 10 in)
- Position: Key defender

Club information
- Current club: Brisbane
- Number: 8

Playing career^{1}
Years	Club	Games (Goals)
2023–	Brisbane	40 (1)

International team honours^{2}
Years	Team	Games (Goals)
2026	Ireland	1 (0)
- ^{1} Playing statistics correct to the end of the 2025 season.^{2} Representative statistics correct as of 2026.

Career highlights
- AFLW premiership: 2023; All-Australian team: 2025

Jennifer Dunne (born 13 December 1999) is a Gaelic football and Australian rules football player. Dunne played for the Dublin team that won the 2018, 2019 and 2020 Ladies' Gaelic football finals. Dunne joined the Brisbane Lions AFLW team in March 2023. Dunne played in the Brisbane Lions team that won the 2023 AFL Women's Grand Final.
