= Aishling Sheridan =

Australian rules footballer

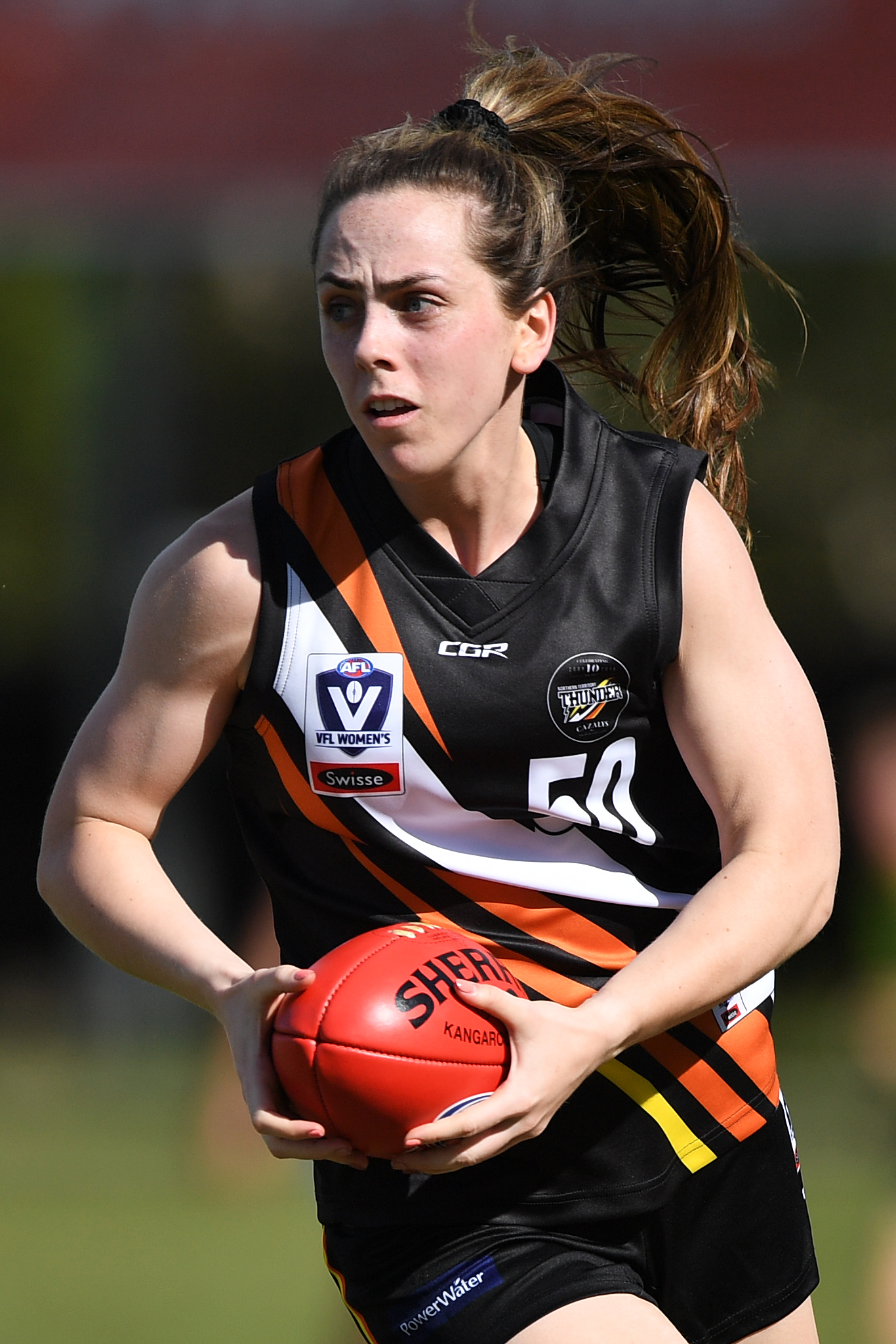
- Sheridan playing for Northern Territory in May 2019

Personal information
- Born: 18 July 1996 (age 30)
- Original team: Cavan (GAA) / NT Thunder (VFLW)
- Draft: 2019 rookie signing
- Debut: Round 1, 2020, Collingwood vs. West Coast, at Victoria Park
- Height: 172 cm (5 ft 8 in)
- Position: Forward

Playing career^{1}
Years	Club	Games (Goals)
2020–2024	Collingwood	47 (15)
- ^{1} Playing statistics correct to the end of the 2024 season.

Aishling Sheridan (born 18 July 1996) is an Irish sportswoman who played Australian rules football for the Collingwood Football Club in the AFL Women's (AFLW). She has also played ladies' Gaelic football for Cavan in the Gaelic Athletic Association (GAA) and Australian rules football for NT Thunder in the VFL Women's (VFLW).

== Ladies' Gaelic football ==
Sheridan played for Cavan in the Gaelic Athletic Association (GAA). She received Team of the League Division 2 honours in 2017 and 2018. With Sheridan, Cavan reached the 2018 Division 2 League Final, but were beaten by Tipperary, despite Sheridan scoring two goals. However, after losing to Monaghan in the Relegation Qualifiers, they beat Tipperary in the 2018 Relegation play-offs and stayed at the senior level for the 2019 season while Tipperary were relegated to the intermediate level. In April 2019, Sheridan scored a hat-trick for Cavan against Kerry. In August 2019, Sheridan helped Cavan once again in the Relegation play-offs, beating Westmeath to stay at senior level for the 2020 season.

== State-tier Australian rules football ==
In September 2018, Sheridan took part in a week-long CrossCoders camp in Melbourne together with 10 other Irish players, including Sarah Rowe who she attended Dublin City University with and would later become her teammate at Collingwood. The camp included kicking sessions, combine tests, a game of CrossCoders against a 2nd-tier VFL Women's (VFLW) side, and a 2 km test. In May 2019, she flew back to Australia to play for NT Thunder in the VFLW for a month, alongside fellow Irishwoman Ailish Considine. The first weekend with NT Thunder she couldn't play due to registration issues and another weekend was a bye round for the club, so she ended up playing only two games, the first at TIO Stadium, NT Thunder's home ground, against Southern Saints and the second against Collingwood, the club which would later sign her professionally. During the bye round she played in a challenge match against the U18 side. During her time with NT Thunder, she played in the back and midfield positions, which aren't her regular positions, and therefore as she said "was out of my comfort zone which was good because it's the best way probably to learn". Her prominence at the CrossCoders camp and impressive performance in the VFLW made her highly sought by at least three clubs.

== AFL Women's career ==
Sheridan signed with Collingwood as a Category B rookie, joining fellow cross-code rookies Sarah Rowe and Sharni Layton, during the 2019 rookie signing period in June. Playing in a practice training match against North Melbourne in January 2020, she caught the eye, offering great speed in the forward line. Sheridan made her professional debut against West Coast at Victoria Park in the opening round of the 2020 season, with Rowe presenting her guernsey before the match. The following round, Sheridan scored her first goal against Collingwood's old rivals Carlton in their first-ever win over them in the AFLW. She scored her second goal a week later in a close loss against Fremantle. Sheridan's first season with Collingwood was a huge success, helping the club reach the finals series. In her debut season, she won the Best First Year Player award, together with Alana Porter.

In December 2024, after spending the 2024 season on the inactive list having chosen to be in Ireland for the year, Sheridan decided not to return to Australia and departed the club to allow her to remain close to her family.

== Personal life ==
Sheridan's close family are all involved in Gaelic football. Her father Gerry played for both Mullahoran and Cavan, as well as managing the Cavan Ladies. Her mother Monica and sisters Geraldine, Louise, and Mona all played for Mullahoran. Sheridan attended Dublin City University and graduated in November 2018 with a degree in Athletic Therapy and Training.

== Statistics ==
Statistics are correct the end of the 2024 season.

Legend
G	Goals	K	Kicks	D	Disposals	T	Tackles
B	Behinds	H	Handballs	M	Marks

Season	Team	No.	Games	Totals							Averages (per game)							Votes
Season	Team	No.	Games	G	B	K	H	D	M	T	G	B	K	H	D	M	T	Votes
2020	Collingwood	14	7	2	4	26	43	69	9	15	0.3	0.6	3.7	6.1	9.9	1.3	2.1	0
2021	Collingwood	14	11	8	12^{‡}	59	42	101	22	26	0.7	1.1^{§}	5.4	3.8	9.2	2.0	2.4	0
2022 (S6)	Collingwood	14	10	4	1	48	59	107	16	27	0.4	0.1	4.8	5.9	10.7	1.6	2.7	0
2022 (S7)	Collingwood	14	9	0	1	56	33	89	10	41	0.0	0.1	6.2	3.7	9.9	1.1	4.6	0
2023	Collingwood	14	10	1	3	93	44	137	15	42	0.1	0.3	9.3	4.4	13.7	1.5	4.2	1
2024	Collingwood	14	0	—	—	—	—	—	—	—	—	—	—	—	—	—	—	—
Career			47	15	21	282	221	503	72	151	0.3	0.4	6.0	4.7	10.7	1.5	3.2	1
