= 2019 All-Ireland Senior Ladies' Football Championship final =

Gaelic football match

2019 All-Ireland Senior Ladies' Football Final
- Event: 2019 All-Ireland Senior Ladies' Football Championship
Dublin	Galway
2-3	0-4
- Dublin complete a three-in-a-row, winning their fourth title during the 2010s.
- Date: 15 September 2019
- Venue: Croke Park, Dublin
- Player of the Match: Lyndsey Davey
- Referee: Brendan Rice (Down)
- Attendance: 56,114
- Weather: 12 °C, heavy rain

The 2019 All-Ireland Senior Ladies' Football Championship Final featured Dublin and Galway. Dublin defeated Galway in a low scoring game, hindered by poor weather conditions. It rained throughout most of the game. Dublin led 1-00 to 0-01 at half-time. Hannah O'Neill provided the assist as Sinéad Goldrick scored a goal for Dublin in the 22nd minute. Galway remained competitive throughout the game and three minutes later, Sarah Conneally scored their opening point. Just fifteen seconds into the second half, Lyndsey Davey scored Dublin's first point. Davey would also provide the assist when Hannah O'Neill scored Dublin's second goal. Galway continued to remain in touch with Dublin thanks to two points via free kicks from their captain, Tracey Leonard. A point from her cousin, Roisín Leonard, made it a one-score game in the 54th minute. However a point each from Sinéad Aherne and Noëlle Healy subsequently secured the win for Dublin. Having started the decade without a single title, the result saw Dublin complete a three-in-a-row, winning their fourth title during the 2010s.

== Attendance record ==
The 2019 final was watched by a record breaking attendance of crowd of 56,114. After the 2019 FIFA Women's World Cup Final with 57,900, it was second largest attendance at any women's sporting final during 2019. For the seventh year in a row the attendance increased, with the figures more than doubling since 2013. It was also claimed that the record attendance was the largest ever attendance at a women's amateur sporting event in Europe. Despite this, it was not held to be an enjoyable spectacle.

== TV audience ==
The 2019 final was broadcast live by TG4. 666,000 tuned in to watch TG4's coverage, with an average audience of 252,500 watching the final. This was an increase of more than 70,000 compared to 2018. This represented the second highest viewing figure for an All-Ireland Senior Ladies' Football Championship final on TG4 since it first started to broadcast the fixture in 2001. The numbers of viewers peaked at 5.19pm with 358,400 tuning in. In addition to TG4's live coverage, on 16 September Sky Sports broadcast a full replay of the final for the first time. It featured commentary by Mike Finnerty and Angela Walsh.

== Match info ==
15 September 2019
16:00 IST

Dublin	2–3; 0–4	Galway
Sinéad Goldrick (1-0); Hannah O'Neill (1-0); Lyndsey Davey (0-1); Sinéad Aherne (0-1); Noëlle Healy (0-1)		Tracey Leonard (0-2); Sarah Conneally (0-1); Roisín Leonard (0-1)

Croke Park, Dublin
Attendance: 56,114
Referee: Brendan Rice (Down)

== Teams ==
Manager: Mick Bohan Dublin; 1 Ciara Trant; 2 Éabha Rutledge; 3 Niamh Collins; 4 Martha Byrne; 5 Aoife Kane; 6 Sinéad Goldrick; 7 Olwen Carey; 8 Lauren Magee; 9 Siobhán McGrath; 10 Carla Rowe; 11 Niamh McEvoy; 12 Lyndsey Davey; 13 Sinéad Aherne (c); 24 Hannah O'Neill; 15 Jennifer Dunne Substitutes: 14 Noëlle Healy for Jennifer Dunne (HT); 19 Caoimhe O'Connor for Niamh McEvoy (42); 22 Oonagh Whyte for Hannah O'Neill (51); 18 Rachel Ruddy for Aoife Kane (64); 23 Niamh Hetherton for Carla Rowe (60)	Manager: Tim Rabbitt Galway; 1 Lisa Murphy; 2 Sinéad Burke; 3 Nicola Ward; 4 Sarah Lynch; 5 Orla Murphy; 6 Barbara Hannon; 7 Shauna Molloy; 8 Louise Ward; 9 Áine McDonagh; 10 Olivia Divilly; 11 Megan Glynn; 12 Mairéad Seoighe; 13 Tracey Leonard (c); 14 Sarah Conneally; 15 Roisín Leonard Substitutes: 19 Fabienne Cooney for Sarah Conneally (42); 22 Charlotte Cooney for Orla Murphy (46); 20 Leanne Coen (Corofin) for Mairead Seoighe (48); 29 Andrea Trill for Roisin Leonard (66); 18 Mairead Coyne for Barbara Hannon (67)
