= 2016 All-Ireland Senior Ladies' Football Championship final =

2016 All-Ireland Senior Ladies' Football Final
- Event: 2016 All-Ireland Senior Ladies' Football Championship

Cork	Dublin
1-7	1-6
- Eleventh All-Ireland title in twelve years for Cork and the sixth of six titles in a row. Third of three successive finals featuring Cork and Dublin
- Date: 25 September 2016
- Venue: Croke Park, Dublin
- Player of the Match: Rena Buckley
- Referee: Brendan Rice (Down)
- Attendance: 34,445
- Weather: 13°C, sunny

The 2016 All-Ireland Senior Ladies' Football Championship Final featured Cork and Dublin. Cork emerged as winners after a controversial 1–7 to 1–6 win over Dublin. In the 22nd minute Dublin's Carla Rowe had a point disallowed. The umpires waved the effort wide but TV replays showed that Rowe's shot had actually gone between the posts. As Hawk-Eye was not used in the All-Ireland Senior Ladies' Football Championship, the decision stood. At half-time Dublin were leading by 0–4 to 0–3. As the second half started Rhona Ní Bhuachalla came on as a substitute and scored with an assist from Ciara O'Sullivan. The teams were level at 1–3 to 0–6 with twenty minutes remaining before Cork scored four unanswered points between the 48th and 54th minutes. Doireann O'Sullivan scored three while Orla Finn was also on target. Dublin were four points down in the final minute when Sinéad Aherne scored from a penalty.

== Match info ==
25 September 2016

Cork	1-7; 1-6	Dublin
Rhona Ní Bhuachalla (1-0); Doireann O'Sullivan (0-3); Orla Finn (0-3); Orlagh Farmer (0-1)		Sinéad Aherne (1-3); Niamh McEvoy (0-1); Noëlle Healy (0-1); Lyndsey Davey (0-1)

Croke Park, Dublin
Attendance: 34,445
Referee: Brendan Rice (Down)

== Teams ==
Manager: Ephie Fitzgerald Team: 1 Martina O'Brien; 2 Marie Ambrose; 3 Bríd Stack; 4 Roisín Phelan; 5 Shauna Kelly; 6 Deirdre O'Reilly; 7 Vera Foley; 8 Annie Walsh; 9 Briege Corkery; 10 Rena Buckley; 11 Aine O'Sullivan; 12 Orlagh Farmer; 13 Ciara O'Sullivan (c); 14 Doireann O'Sullivan; 15 Orla Finn Substitutes: Rhona Ní Bhuachalla for Á. O'Sullivan (half time); Eimear Scally for Walsh (44)	Manager: Gregory McGonigle Team: 1 Ciara Trant; 2 Olwen Carey; 3 Deirdre Murphy; 4 Leah Caffrey; 5 Sinéad Goldrick; 6 Sinead Finnegan; 7 Niamh Collins; 8 Lauren Magee; 9 Niamh McEvoy; 10 Molly Lamb; 11 Noëlle Healy (c); 12 Carla Rowe; 13 Lyndsey Davey; 14 Sinéad Aherne; 15 Nicole Owens Substitutes: Siobhan Woods for Owens (44); Muireann Ni Scanaill for Caffrey (44); Sorcha Furlong for Lamb (50); O. Leonard for McEvoy (52); Lucy Collins for Murphy (53)
