= Dublin county ladies' football team =

Irish women's football team

Dublin
- Sport: Ladies' football
- Irish: Áth Cliath
- Nickname(s): The Jackies; The Sky Blues; The Blues Sisters; Girls in Blue
- Home venue(s): Parnell Park
First colours	Second colours

The Dublin county ladies' football team represents Dublin GAA in ladies' Gaelic football. The team competes in inter-county competitions such as the All-Ireland Senior Ladies' Football Championship, the Leinster Senior Ladies' Football Championship and the Ladies' National Football League.

Dublin played in their first All-Ireland final in 2003 and won their first All-Ireland title in 2010. Between 2014 and 2020, they played in seven successive All-Ireland finals. They finished as runners up to Cork in the first three, before winning four successive titles between 2017 and 2020. In 2018 Dublin also won their first League title.

== Senior final appearances ==
All-Irelands

Dublin played in their first All-Ireland final in 2003 and won their first All-Ireland title in 2010. Between 2014 and 2020 they played in seven successive All-Ireland finals. They finished as runners-up to Cork in the first three, before winning four successive titles between 2017 and 2020.

Season	Winner	Score	Runners–up
2003	Mayo	1–4; 0–5	Dublin
2004	Galway	3–8; 0–11	Dublin
2009	Cork	1–9; 0–11	Dublin
2010	Dublin	3–16; 0–9	Tyrone
2014	Cork	2–13; 2-12	Dublin
2015	Cork	0-12; 0-10	Dublin
2016	Cork	1-7; 1-6	Dublin
2017	Dublin	4-11; 0-11	Mayo
2018	Dublin	3-11; 1-12	Cork
2019	Dublin	2–3; 0–4	Galway
2020	Dublin	1–10; 1–5	Cork
2023	Dublin	0–18; 1–10	Kerry

Ladies' National Football League

In 2018 Dublin won their first League title.

Season	Winner	Score	Runners–up
2014	Cork		Dublin
2018	Dublin	3–15;1–10	Mayo

Leinster Senior Ladies' Football Championship

Season	Winner	Score	Runners–up
2003	Dublin		
2004	Dublin	2–10;0–7	Laois
2005	Dublin		
2008	Dublin	1–15;0–15	Laois
2009	Dublin		Kildare
2010	Dublin		Laois
2012	Dublin		
2013	Dublin		
2014	Dublin		
2015	Dublin	2–12;0–11	Westmeath
2016	Dublin	4–21;0–7	Westmeath
2017	Dublin	3–18;0–8	Westmeath
2018	Dublin	5–11;2–8	Westmeath
2019	Dublin	4–11;1–7	Westmeath

== Youth teams ==
Dublin ladies teams also compete in All-Ireland championships at the under-14, under-16 and under-18 levels.

== 2018 squad ==
- Manager: Mick Bohan
- Selectors: Ken Robinson, Niamh McEvoy, Sorcha Farrelly, Seaghan Kearney

No.	Player	Position	Club
1	Ciara Trant	Goalkeeper	St Brigid's
2	Martha Byrne	Right Corner Back	Cuala
3	Sinéad Finnegan	Full back	Fingallians
4	Rachel Ruddy	Left Corner Back	Ballyboden St Enda's
5	Sinéad Goldrick	Right half back	Foxrock–Cabinteely
6	Niamh Collins	Centre back	Foxrock–Cabinteely
7	Leah Caffrey	Left half back	Na Fianna
8	Lauren Magee	Midfield	Kilmacud Crokes
9	Olwen Carey	Midfield	Thomas Davis
10	Carla Rowe	Right half forward	Clann Mhuire
11	Lyndsey Davey	Centre forward	Skerries Harps
12	Nicole Owens	Left half forward	St Sylvester's
13	Sinéad Aherne (c)	Right corner forward	St Sylvester's
14	Niamh McEvoy	Full forward	St Sylvester's
15	Noëlle Healy	Left corner forward	St Brigid's
16	Emer Ní Eafa	Substitute	Fingallians
17	Fiona Hudson	Substitute	Fingallians
18	Deirdre Murphy	Substitute	St Brigid's
19	Aoife Kane	Substitute	Kilmacud Crokes
20	Hannah O'Neill	Substitute	Foxrock–Cabinteely
21	Molly Lamb	Substitute	Kilmacud Crokes
22	Rebecca McDonnell	Substitute	Clanna Gael Fontenoy
23	Laura McGinley	Substitute	Naomh Barróg
24	Sarah McCaffrey	Substitute	Clontarf
25	Siobhán Woods	Substitute	Raheny
26	Kate Fitzgibbon	Substitute	O'Tooles
27	Sinéad O'Mahony	Substitute	Skerries Harps
28	Tarah O'Sullivan	Substitute	Foxrock–Cabinteely
29	Denise McKenna	Substitute	Fingallians
30	Aoife Curran	Substitute	O'Dwyers
x	Amy Connolly	Substitute	Foxrock–Cabinteely
x	Siobhán Killeen	Substitute	Clontarf

== Notable players ==
=== TG4 Senior Player's Player of the Year ===
Season	
2018	Sinéad Aherne
2017	Noëlle Healy
2019	Siobhán McGrath

=== All Stars ===
Season	
2019	Niamh Collins, Sinéad Goldrick, Olwen Carey, Siobhán McGrath, Carla Rowe, Niamh McEvoy, Lyndsey Davey
2018	Sinéad Aherne, Sinéad Goldrick, Ciara Trant, Siobhán McGrath, Lauren Magee, Noëlle Healy, Lyndsey Davey
2017	Ciara Trant, Rachel Ruddy, Leah Caffrey, Nicole Owens, Sinéad Aherne, Noëlle Healy
2016	Leah Caffrey, Sinéad Goldrick, Noëlle Healy, Carla Rowe, Sinéad Aherne
2015	Sinead Finnegan, Sinéad Goldrick, Carla Rowe, Lyndsey Davey
2014	Sinéad Goldrick, Noëlle Healy, Lyndsey Davey, Sinéad Aherne
2013	Sinéad Goldrick
2012	Sinéad Goldrick
2011	Elaine Kelly, Sinéad Aherne
2010	Rachel Ruddy, Siobhán McGrath, Gemma Fay, Denise Masterson, Amy McGuinness, Sinéad Aherne
2009	Clíodhna O'Connor, Siobhán McGrath, Sinéad Aherne
2005	Gemma Fay, Lyndsey Davey
2004	Clíodhna O'Connor, Louise Keegan, Bernie Finlay, Mary Nevin
2003	Maria Kavanagh, Martina Farrell, Angie McNally
2002	Suzanne Hughes, Síle Nic Coitir
2001	Louise Kelly
1993	Denise Smith
1991	Julie Kavanagh
1984	Kathleen Kennedy
1983	Kathleen Kennedy

=== Ireland internationals ===
A number of Dublin ladies' footballers have also represented Ireland at international level in various other sports.

Players	Sport
Sinéad Aherne	International Rules Football
Nicola Daly	Field hockey
Deirdre Duke	Field hockey; represented Dublin at under-14 level.
Sarah Hawkshaw	Field hockey; represented Dublin at under-16 level.
Siobhán Killeen	Association football
Clíodhna O'Connor	International Rules Football
Lindsay Peat	Rugby union, Basketball, Association football (under-18)
Hannah Tyrrell	Rugby union and Rugby sevens
Emily Whelan	Association football; represented Dublin at under-16 level.

=== Others ===
- Joanne Cantwell – RTÉ sports presenter

== Managers ==
Season	
Mick Bohan	2003
John O'Leary	2004
Gerry McGill	2009, 2010
Gregory McGonigle	2014, 2015, 2016
Mick Bohan	2017, 2018, 2019

== Honours ==
Senior;

- All-Ireland Senior Ladies' Football Championship
  - Winners: 2010, 2017, 2018, 2019, 2020, 2023: 6
  - Runners up: 2003, 2004, 2009, 2014, 2015, 2016, 2021: 7
- Ladies' National Football League
  - Winners: 2018, 2021: 2
  - Runners up: 2014 : 1
- Leinster Senior Ladies' Football Championship
  - Winners: 2003, 2004, 2005, 2008, 2009, 2010, 2012, 2013, 2014, 2015, 2016, 2017, 2018, 2019: 14

Youth;

- All-Ireland Under-18 Ladies' Football Championship
  - Winners: 2008, 2012: 2
  - Runners up: 1990, 2007, 2011, 2013, 2016 : 5
- All-Ireland Under-16 Ladies' Football Championship
  - Winners: 1989, 2006, 2010: 3
  - Runners up: 2005, 2011, 2013, 2014, 2016 : 5
- All-Ireland Under-14 Ladies' Football Championship
  - Winners: 2004, 2005, 2007: 3
  - Runners up: 2006, 2010, 2011, 2018 : 4
