= Lyndsey Davey =

Dublin senior ladies' footballer

Personal information
- Born: 24 August 1989 (age 37)
- Occupation: Firefighter/ Paramedic
- Height: 5 ft 6 in (1.68 m)

Sport
- Sport: Ladies' Gaelic football
- Position: Centre forward
Clubs
- Years: Club
- 1994– 2007–2012: Skerries Harps → DCU
Inter-county
- Years: County
- 2004–: Dublin
Inter-county titles
- All-Irelands: 5
- NFL: 1
- All Stars: 5

Lyndsey Davey is a senior Dublin ladies' footballer. She was a member of the Dublin teams that won the All-Ireland Senior Ladies' Football Championship in 2010, 2017, 2018, 2019 and 2020. She captained Dublin in 2015. She was also a member of the Dublin team that won the 2018 Ladies' National Football League. In 2019 she received her fifth All Star award. She won her first All Star in 2005 at the age of 15.

== Early years, family and education ==
Davey is from Skerries, County Dublin. Her father, Willie Davey, was on the Dublin Masters team that won the 2004 All-Ireland title. He also coached gaelic football at Skerries Harps. Between 2007 and 2012 Davey attended Dublin City University.

== Playing career ==
=== Club ===
Davey began playing gaelic football at Skerries Harps from the age of five. Initially she played with boys teams as the club did not have any girls teams. She continued to play with boys team until under-12 level when Harps set up a ladies team. While attending Dublin City University, Davey also played for DCU GAA. She was a member of the DCU team that won the O'Connor Cup three times in a row between 2009 and 2011. Her teammates at DCU included Niamh McEvoy of Parnells.

=== Inter-county ===
Davey represented Dublin at under-14 and under-16 levels. Her teammates at under-14 level included Nicola Daly. She made her senior debut for Dublin in the 2004 Leinster final when she came on as substitute against Laois at the age of 14. She made her first senior start in the 2004 All-Ireland quarter final against Donegal. By the age of 15 she had played in her first All-Ireland final and by the age of 16 she had won her first All Star. She was a member of the Dublin team that won the 2010 All-Ireland Senior Ladies' Football Championship final. Davey was a regular in the Dublin team during the 2010s, finishing as an All-Ireland runner-up in 2014, 2015 and 2016. In January 2015 Davey was appointed Dublin captain. She captained Dublin to the 2015 Leinster title. She also captained Dublin in the 2015 All-Ireland final. She was subsequently a member of the Dublin teams that won the 2017, 2018 and 2019 All-Ireland finals. She was named Player of the Match in the 2019 final. She was also a member of the Dublin team won the 2018 Ladies' National Football League. In 2019 Davey won her fifth All Star award.

	All-Ireland Finals	Place	Opponent	Goal/Points
1	2004	Runner up	Galway	0–1
2	2009	Runner up	Cork	0–1
3	2010	Winners	Tyrone	0–2
4	2014	Runner up	Cork	0–3
5	2015	Runner up	Cork	0–1
6	2016	Runner up	Cork	0–1
7	2017	Winners	Mayo	0–0
8	2018	Winners	Cork	0–0
9	2019	Winners	Galway	0–1

== Employment ==
Since 2015 Davey has worked as a firefighter with Dublin Airport Fire Service. She previously worked in Croke Park in the financial department of the GAA.

== Honours ==
Dublin

- All-Ireland Senior Ladies' Football Championship
  - Winners: 2010, 2017, 2018, 2019: 4
  - Runner up: 2004, 2009, 2014, 2015, 2016: 5
- Ladies' National Football League
  - 2018: 1

DCU GAA

- O'Connor Cup
  - Winners: 2009, 2010, 2011: 3

Individual

- All Stars
  - Winner: 2005, 2014, 2015, 2018: 4
