= Sinéad Aherne =

Dublin senior ladies' footballer

Personal information
- Native name: Sinéad Ní Eathírn (Irish)
- Born: 9 April 1986 (age 40)
- Occupation: Accountant
- Height: 5 ft 4 in (1.63 m)

Sport
- Sport: Ladies' Gaelic football
- Position: Right corner forward
Clubs
- Years: Club
- 2007: St Sylvester's → Naomh Mearnóg/St Sylvester's → DIT
Inter-county
- Years: County
- 2003–: Dublin
Inter-county titles
- All-Irelands: 5
- All Stars: 7

Sinéad Aherne is a senior Dublin ladies' footballer. In 2017, 2018, 2019 and 2020, she captained Dublin as they won the All-Ireland Senior Ladies' Football Championship. In 2010, when Dublin won their first All-Ireland title, she was both player of the match and the top scorer in the final with 2–7. She also captained Dublin when they won the 2018 Ladies' National Football League. In 2018 she was named the TG4 Senior Player's Player of the Year and received her seventh All Star award. She has also represented Ireland at international rules.

== Playing career ==
=== Club ===
At club level, Aherne has played for St Sylvester's and DIT. Aherne scored 3–4 and was player of the match when St Sylvester's won the 2004 Dublin Ladies' Junior Football Championship, defeating Raheny by 4–14 to 2–5 in the final. She also played for a combined Naomh Mearnóg/St Sylvester's team that lost to Ballyboden St Enda's by 1–12 to 1–10 in the 2007 Dublin Ladies' Senior Football Championship final.

=== Inter-county ===
Aherne made her senior inter-county debut for Dublin in 2003 against Longford. In 2003, aged 17, she made her debut appearance in an All-Ireland final when she came on as a second-half substitute and scored a point against Mayo. In 2010, when Dublin won their first All-Ireland title, she was both player of the match and the top scorer in the final with 2–7. Aherne has been for regular for Dublin during the 2010s, missing only the 2015 season as she went travelling in Australia and Asia. In 2017 she was named Dublin captain, taking over from Noëlle Healy. She subsequently captained Dublin as they won the 2017, 2018 and 2019 All-Ireland finals. She also captained Dublin when they won the 2018 Ladies' National Football League. In 2018 Aherne was named the TG4 Senior Player's Player of the Year and received her seventh All Star award.

	All-Ireland Finals	Place	Opponent	Goal/Points
1	2003	Runner up	Mayo	0–1
2	2004	Runner up	Galway	0–0
3	2009	Runner up	Cork	0–3
4	2010	Winners	Tyrone	2–7
5	2014	Runner up	Cork	0–3
6	2016	Runner up	Cork	1–3
7	2017	Winners	Mayo	0–9
8	2018	Winners	Cork	1–7
9	2019	Winners	Galway	0–1

=== International rules football ===
Aherne was a member of the Ireland women's international rules football team that played against Australia in the 2006 Ladies' International Rules Series.

== Accountant ==
Aherne is a graduate of the Dublin Institute of Technology where she gained a BSc in Business and Management and a MSc in Accounting. Since 2010 Aherne has worked as a chartered accountant with KPMG. She is now an associate director of tax with the company.

== Honours ==
Dublin

- All-Ireland Senior Ladies' Football Championship
  - Winners: 2010, 2017, 2018, 2019, 2020: 5
  - Runner up: 2003, 2004, 2009, 2014, 2016: 5
- Ladies' National Football League
  - Winners: 2018: 1

St Sylvester's

- Dublin Ladies' Junior Football Championship
  - Winners: 2004

Naomh Mearnóg/St Sylvester's

- Dublin Ladies' Senior Football Championship
  - Runner up: 2007

Individual

- TG4 Senior Player's Player of the Year
  - Winner: 2018
- All Stars
  - Winner: 2009, 2010, 2011, 2014, 2016, 2017, 2018: 7
