= 2018 All-Ireland Senior Ladies' Football Championship final =

2018 All-Ireland Senior Ladies' Football Final
- Event: 2018 All-Ireland Senior Ladies' Football Championship
Dublin	Cork
3-11	1-12
- Dublin and Cork meet for the fourth time in five years. Dublin defeat Cork for the first time. They also win back-to-back All-Irelands for the first time
- Date: 16 September 2018
- Venue: Croke Park, Dublin
- Player of the Match: Carla Rowe
- Referee: Garryowen McMahon (Mayo)
- Attendance: 50,141
- Weather: 18 °C, cloudy

The 2018 All-Ireland Senior Ladies' Football Championship Final featured Dublin and Cork for the fourth time in five years. Cork were aiming to preserve their unbeaten record in All Ireland Finals, however Dublin defeated Cork for the first time. This was the first time Cork had lost an All Ireland Final. Dublin also won back-to-back All-Irelands for the first time. Dublin captain, Sinéad Aherne, was the game's top scorer with 1-7 while Carla Rowe scored a goal in each half. Cork's top scorer was Orla Finn who scored 0-8 from free kicks.

== Attendance record ==
For the second year in succession, the attendance record was broken. In 2017 a crowd of 46,286 attended the final at Croke Park. The 2018 final saw an increase of almost 4,000 as the attendance reached 50,141. The ladies' final was better attended than the 2018 men's All-Ireland semi-final between Tyrone and Monaghan which was watched by a crowd of 49,696.

== TV audience ==
The 2018 final was broadcast live by TG4. An average of 179,000 viewers watched the final, representing a 26.1% share of viewing. The match peaked just before the final whistle, at 5.21pm, with 283,500 viewers. The game commanded a 23.7% share of women and a 29.5% share of men.

== Match info ==
16 September 2018
16:00 IST (UTC+1)

Dublin	3-11; 1-12	Cork
Sinéad Aherne (1-7); Carla Rowe (2-0); Nicole Owens (0-2); Niamh McEvoy (0-1); Sinéad Goldrick (0-1)		Orla Finn (0-8); Áine Kelly (1-1); Ciara O'Sullivan (0-2); Doireann O'Sullivan (0-1)

Croke Park, Dublin
Attendance: 50,141
Referee: Garryowen McMahon (Mayo)

== Teams ==
Manager: Mick Bohan Team: 1 Ciara Trant; 2 Niamh Collins; 3 Leah Caffrey; 4 Martha Byrne; 5 Sinéad Goldrick; 6 Sinéad Finnegan; 7 Siobhán McGrath; 8 Lauren Magee; 9 Olwen Carey; 10 Lyndsey Davey; 11 Niamh McEvoy; 12 Carla Rowe; 13 Sinéad Aherne (c); 14 Noëlle Healy; 15 Nicole Owens Substitutes: Jennifer Dunne for Owens (51); Hannah O’Neill for McEvoy (53); Amy Connolly for Healy (60)	Manager: Ephie Fitzgerald Team: 1 Martina O'Brien; 2 Emma Spillane; 3 Róisín Phelan; 4 Melissa Duggan; 5 Marie O'Callaghan; 6 Eimear Meaney; 7 Shauna Kelly; 8 Áine Kelly; 9 Hannah Looney; 10 Doireann O'Sullivan; 11 Ciara O'Sullivan (c); 12 Aisling Hutchings; 13 Libby Coppinger; 14 Eimear Scally; 15 Orla Finn Substitutes: Saoirse Noonan for Coppinger (HT); Orlagh Farmer for Looney (54); Chloe Collins for Spillane (54)
