= 2015 All-Ireland Senior Ladies' Football Championship final =

2015 All-Ireland Senior Ladies' Football Final
- Event: 2015 All-Ireland Senior Ladies' Football Championship

Cork	Dublin
0-12	0-10
- Tenth All-Ireland title in eleven years for Cork and the fifth of six titles in a row. Second of three successive finals featuring Cork and Dublin
- Date: 27 September 2015
- Venue: Croke Park, Dublin
- Player of the Match: Briege Corkery
- Referee: John Niland (Sligo)
- Attendance: 31,083

The 2015 All-Ireland Senior Ladies' Football Championship Final featured Cork and Dublin. Cork defeated Dublin by two points in what an RTÉ Sport report described as "largely a defensive affair" and a "tight encounter". For the Dublin manager, Gregory McGonigle, it was his fourth defeat to Cork in an All-Ireland final. The two sides were level at half-time with 0–5 each.

== Match info ==
27 September 2015

Cork	0–12; 0–10	Dublin
Valerie Mulcahy (0-7); Doireann O'Sullivan (0-2); Rena Buckley (0-1); Ciara O'Sullivan (0-1); Eimear Scally (0-1)		Carla Rowe (0-6); Amy Connolly (0-1); Niamh McEvoy (0-1); Lyndsey Davey (0-1); Sarah McCaffrey (0-1)

Croke Park, Dublin
Attendance: 31,083
Referee: John Niland (Sligo)

== Teams ==
Manager: Éamonn Ryan Team: 1 Martina O'Brien; 2 Marie Ambrose; 3 Bríd Stack; 4 Aisling Barrett; 5 Vera Foley; 6 Deirdre O'Reilly; 7 Geraldine O'Flynn; 8 Rena Buckley; 9 Briege Corkery; 10 Ciara O'Sullivan (c); 11 Aisling Hutchings; 12 Annie Walsh; 13 Valerie Mulcahy; 14 Aine O'Sullivan; 15 Doireann O'Sullivan Substitutes: Roisín Phelan for O'Flynn (15); Eimear Scally for Á. O'Sullivan (39); Orla Finn for Hutchings (42); Rhona Ní Bhuachalla for Walsh (49)	Manager: Gregory McGonigle Team: 1 Ciara Trant; 2 Olwen Carey; 3 Muireann Ni Scanaill; 4 Fiona Hudson; 5 Sorcha Furlong; 6 Sinead Finnegan; 7 C. Barrett; 8 Molly Lamb; 9 Sinéad Goldrick; 10 Noëlle Healy; 11 Amy Connolly; 12 Carla Rowe; 13 Niamh McEvoy; 14 Lyndsey Davey (c); 15 Hannah Noonan Substitutes: K. Flood for Noonan (half time); Nicole Owens for Barrett (39); Niamh Collins for Hudson (47); Sarah McCaffrey for Connolly (51); N. Rickard for Goldrick (56)
