= 2018 Ladies' National Football League =

League details
- Dates: 28 January – 7 May 2018
- Teams: 32

League champions
- Winners: Dublin (1st win)
- Captain: Sinéad Aherne
- Manager: Mick Bohan

League runners-up
- Runners-up: Mayo
- Captain: Sarah Tierney
- Manager: Peter Leahy

Other division winners
- Division 2: Tipperary
- Division 3: Wexford
- Division 4: Wicklow

The 2018 Ladies' National Football League, known for sponsorship reasons as the Lidl Ladies' National Football League, is a ladies' Gaelic football competition taking place in early 2018.

For the first time, LNFL games were broadcast live on Eir Sport.

Dublin were the winners, defeating Mayo in the final.

== Format ==
=== League structure ===
The 2018 Ladies' National Football League consists of four divisions of eight teams. Each team plays every other team in its division once. 3 points are awarded for a win and 1 for a draw.

Teams by Province
| Province | Division 1 | Division 2 | Division 3 | Division 4 |
|---|---|---|---|---|
| Connacht | 2 | 1 | 2 | 0 |
| Leinster | 2 | 1 | 5 | 4 |
| Munster | 2 | 3 | 0 | 1 |
| Ulster | 2 | 3 | 1 | 3 |

If two teams are level on points, the tie-break is:

- winners of the head-to-head game are ranked ahead
- if the head-to-head match was a draw, then whichever team scored more points in the game is ranked ahead (e.g. 1-15 beats 2-12)
- if the head-to-head match was an exact draw, ranking is determined by the points difference (i.e. total scored minus total conceded in all games)
- if the points difference is equal, ranking is determined by the total scored

If three or more teams are level on league points, rankings are determined solely by points difference.

=== Finals, promotions and relegations ===
The top four teams in Division 1 contest the Ladies' National Football League semi-finals (first plays fourth and second plays third).

The top four teams in divisions 2, 3 and 4 contest the semi-finals of their respective divisions. The division champions are promoted.

The last-placed teams in divisions 1, 2 and 3 are relegated.

== Division 1 ==
=== Table ===
| Pos | Team | Pld | W | D | L | PF | PA | PD | Pts | Qualification or relegation |
|---|---|---|---|---|---|---|---|---|---|---|
| 1 | Dublin | 7 | 6 | 0 | 1 | 126 | 92 | +34 | 18 | Advance to Semi-Finals |
| 2 | Cork | 7 | 5 | 0 | 2 | 130 | 97 | +33 | 15 | Advance to Semi-Finals |
| 3 | Mayo | 7 | 5 | 0 | 2 | 120 | 102 | +18 | 15 | Advance to Semi-Finals |
| 4 | Galway | 7 | 4 | 1 | 2 | 111 | 97 | +14 | 13 | Advance to Semi-Finals |
| 5 | Donegal | 7 | 4 | 1 | 2 | 153 | 89 | +64 | 13 | |
| 6 | Monaghan | 7 | 2 | 0 | 5 | 89 | 47 | +42 | 6 | |
| 7 | Westmeath | 7 | 1 | 0 | 6 | 18 | 27 | −9 | 3 | |
| 8 | Kerry | 7 | 0 | 0 | 7 | 75 | 130 | −55 | 0 | Relegation to Division 2 |

Updated to match(es) played on 8 April 2018. Source: ladiesgaelic.ie
- Kerry defeated Mayo, but Mayo were awarded the points as Kerry had fielded an ineligible player.
- Galway are ranked ahead of Donegal because, although the head-to-head game was a draw, Galway scored more points (0-16 to 1-13).

=== Finals ===
==== Semi-finals ====
22 April 2018
3 p.m.
Semi-Final 1

Report

| Dublin | 2-8 (14) – (13) 2-7 | Galway |
|---|---|---|
| Pts: Niamh McEvoy 1-1; Sinéad Aherne 0-3 (all frees); Nicole Owens 1-0; Noëlle Healy 0-2; Sinéad Goldrick 0-1; Lauren Magee 0-1 | | Pts: Tracey Leonard 0-5 (four frees); Leanne Coen 1-1; Mairead Seoighe 1-0; Olivia Divilly 0-1 |

Coralstown/Kinnegad GAA, Kinnegad
Referee: Séamus Mulvihill (Kerry)

22 April 2018
3 p.m.
Semi-Final 2

Report

| Cork | 3-12 (21) – (23) 1-20 | Mayo |
|---|---|---|
| Pts: O Finn 1-9 (5f); L Coppinger 2-0; C O’Sullivan 0-2; E Scally 0-1 | | Pts: Sarah Rowe 0-9 (4f); G Kelly 0-7 (3f); S Cafferky 1-1; N Kelly 0-1; A Gilroy 0-1; F McHale 0-1 |

St. Brendan's Park, Birr
Referee: Brendan Rice (Down)

=== Final ===
TG4

6 May 2018
16:00 IST (UTC+1)
Final

| Dublin | 3-15 (24) – (13) 1-10 | Mayo |
|---|---|---|
(HT: 2-10 – 1-05)
| Gls: Sinéad Aherne (pen), Noëlle Healy, Laura McGinley; Pts: Sinéad Aherne (9, 5f), Nicole Owens (2), Noëlle Healy, Olwen Carey, Niamh McEvoy, Lyndsey Davey | | Gls: Sarah Rowe (pen); Pts: Sarah Rowe (5, 2f), Grace Kelly (2, 2f), Fiona Doherty, Sinead Cafferky, Niamh Kelly |

Parnell Park, Dublin
Referee: Brendan Rice (Down)

== Division 2 ==
=== Table ===
| Team | Pld | W | D | L | F | A | Diff | Pts | Notes |
|---|---|---|---|---|---|---|---|---|---|
| Waterford | 7 | 6 | 0 | 1 | 137 | 87 | +50 | 18 | Advance to Division 2 semi-finals |
| Tipperary (P) | 7 | 6 | 0 | 1 | 136 | 91 | +45 | 18 | Advance to Division 2 semi-finals |
| Armagh | 7 | 4 | 1 | 2 | 168 | 97 | +71 | 13 | Advance to Division 2 semi-finals |
| Cavan | 7 | 4 | 1 | 2 | 142 | 95 | +47 | 13 | Advance to Division 2 semi-finals |
| Tyrone | 7 | 4 | 0 | 3 | 132 | 126 | +6 | 12 |
| Laois | 7 | 2 | 0 | 5 | 97 | 151 | –54 | 6 |
| Clare | 7 | 1 | 0 | 6 | 97 | 141 | –44 | 3 |
| Sligo | 7 | 0 | 0 | 7 | 78 | 199 | –121 | 0 | Relegated to Division 3 for 2019 |

- Armagh v. Cavan was a draw (2-14 each); the teams are ranked by score difference.

=== Finals ===
==== Semi-finals ====
22 April 2018
1 p.m.
Semi-Final 1

| Waterford | 0-8 – 1-8 | Cavan |

Coralstown/Kinnegad GAA, Kinnegad
Referee: Garryown McMahon (Mayo)

22 April 2018
Semi-Final 2

| Tipperary | 3-10 – 4-6 | Armagh |

St. Brendan's Park, Birr

=== Final ===
| 6 May 2018; 14:00; Final | Cavan | 3-11 – 0-21 | Tipperary | Parnell Park; Referee: Stephen McNulty (Wicklow); Man of the Match: Aisling Moloney (Cahir) |
| 6 May 2018; 14:00; Final | Aisling Sheridan 2-0, Roisin O'Keeffe 1-2, Bronagh Sheridan 0-4 (0-1f), Aisling Maguire 0-3f, Sinéad Greene and Donna English 0-1 each | Report | Aishling McCarthy 0-10 (0-6f), Aisling Moloney 0-5, Mairead Morrissey 0-2, Jenny Grant, Gillian O'Brien, Niamh Lonergan, Roisin Howard 0-1 each | Parnell Park; Referee: Stephen McNulty (Wicklow); Man of the Match: Aisling Moloney (Cahir) |

== Division 3 ==
=== Table ===
| Team | Pld | W | D | L | F | A | Diff | Pts | Notes |
|---|---|---|---|---|---|---|---|---|---|
| Wexford (P) | 7 | 6 | 0 | 1 | 114 | 88 | +26 | 18 | Advance to Division 3 semi-finals |
| Meath | 7 | 5 | 0 | 2 | 173 | 82 | +91 | 15 | Advance to Division 3 semi-finals |
| Down | 7 | 5 | 0 | 2 | 84 | 99 | –15 | 15 | Advance to Division 3 semi-finals |
| Kildare | 7 | 4 | 0 | 3 | 116 | 94 | +22 | 12 | Advance to Division 3 semi-finals |
| Roscommon | 7 | 4 | 0 | 3 | 103 | 83 | +20 | 12 |
| Offaly | 7 | 2 | 1 | 4 | 126 | 131 | –5 | 7 |
| Longford | 7 | 1 | 1 | 5 | 47 | 125 | –78 | 4 |
| Leitrim | 7 | 0 | 0 | 7 | 22 | 83 | –61 | 0 | Relegated to Division 4 for 2019 |

- Meath are ranked ahead of Down as they won the head-to-head game between the teams.
- Kildare are ranked ahead of Roscommon as they won the head-to-head game between the teams.

=== Finals ===
==== Semi-finals ====
22 April 2018
2 p.m.
Semi-Final 1

| Wexford | 2-14 – 0-11 | Kildare |

Bill Delaney Park, Stradbally, County Laois
Referee: John Gallagher

22 April 2018
1 p.m.
Semi-Final 2

| Meath | 6-17 – 0-3 | Down |

Inniskeen Grattans GAC, Inniskeen
Referee: Jonathan Murphy

=== Final ===
| 7 May 2018; 16:00; Final | Wexford | 3-10 – 1-12 | Meath | St. Brendan's Park, Birr; Referee: Maggie Farrelly (Cavan); Man of the Match: Catriona Murray (Clonee) |
| 7 May 2018; 16:00; Final | Catriona Murray 3-5 (0-3f), Bernie Breen 0-2, Niamh Butler, Clara Donnelly, Fiona Rochford 0-1 each | Report | Stacey Grimes 1-3 (1-0 pen, 0-1f), Niamh Gallogly and Vikki Wall 0-2 each, Katie Byrne, Aoibhin Cleary, Marion Farrelly, Niamh O'Sullivan, Fiona O'Neill 0-1 each | St. Brendan's Park, Birr; Referee: Maggie Farrelly (Cavan); Man of the Match: Catriona Murray (Clonee) |

== Division 4 ==
| Team | Pld | W | D | L | F | A | Diff | Pts | Notes |
|---|---|---|---|---|---|---|---|---|---|
| Wicklow (P) | 7 | 7 | 0 | 0 | 113 | 49 | +64 | 21 | Advance to Division 4 semi-finals |
| Louth | 7 | 5 | 0 | 2 | 120 | 69 | +51 | 15 | Advance to Division 4 semi-finals |
| Limerick | 7 | 4 | 1 | 2 | 113 | 53 | +60 | 13 | Advance to Division 4 semi-finals |
| Antrim | 7 | 4 | 0 | 3 | 90 | 79 | +11 | 12 | Advance to Division 4 semi-finals |
| Fermanagh | 7 | 4 | 0 | 3 | 84 | 85 | –1 | 12 |
| Carlow | 7 | 2 | 1 | 4 | 115 | 94 | +21 | 7 |
| Derry | 7 | 1 | 0 | 6 | 41 | 110 | –69 | 3 |
| Kilkenny | 7 | 0 | 0 | 7 | 16 | 153 | –137 | 0 |

- Antrim are ranked ahead of Fermanagh as they won the head-to-head game between the teams.

=== Finals ===
==== Semi-finals ====
22 April 2018
3 p.m.
Semi-Final 1

| Wicklow | 7-13 – 0-9 | Antrim |

Inniskeen Grattans GAC, Inniskeen
Referee: Declan Carolan

22 April 2018
2 p.m.
Semi-Final 2

| Louth | 1-15 – 0-9 | Limerick |

McCann Park, Portarlington
Referee: Yvonne Duffy

=== Final ===
| 7 May 2018; 14:00; Final | Wicklow | 4-17 – 2-8 | Louth | St. Brendan's Park, Birr; Referee: Gerry Carmody (Mayo); Man of the Match: Marie Kealy (Baltinglass) |
| 7 May 2018; 14:00; Final | Marie Kealy 3-3 (0-1f), Jackie Kinch 0-5, Meadhbh Deeney 1-3 (0-1f), Amy Murphy 0-2, Lorna Fusciardi, Laura Hogan, Clodagh Fox, Naoise Baker 0-1 each | Report | Kate Flood 1-3 (0-1f), Lauren Boyle 1-2 (0-1f), Paula Murray, Susan Byrne, Catherine McGlew 0-1 each | St. Brendan's Park, Birr; Referee: Gerry Carmody (Mayo); Man of the Match: Marie Kealy (Baltinglass) |
