= Noëlle Healy =

Dublin senior ladies' footballer

Personal information
- Native name: Nollaig Nic Éilidhe (Irish)
- Born: c. 1991 (age 34–35)
- Occupation: Doctor
- Height: 5 ft 6 in (1.68 m)

Sport
- Sport: Ladies' Football
- Position: Forward
Clubs
- Years: Club
- 2000–2019 2009–2015 2019–: St Brigid's → UCD; Mourneabbey
Inter-county
- Years: County
- 2007–2021: Dublin
Inter-county titles
- All-Irelands: 5
- All Stars: 4

Dr. Noëlle Healy is a senior Dublin ladies' footballer. She was a member of the Dublin teams that won the All-Ireland Senior Ladies' Football Championship in 2010, 2017, 2018, 2019 and 2020. She captained Dublin in the 2016 final and was named Player of the Match following the 2017 final. In 2017 she was also named the TG4 Senior Player's Player of the Year. She was the first Dublin player to win the award. She was also a member of the Dublin team that won the 2018 Ladies' National Football League and in the same year collected her fourth All Star award.

== Early years, family and education ==
Healy was born in Belgium but is from Castleknock. She was educated at Loreto College on St Stephen's Green and represented the school at basketball. She made her first trip to Croke Park in 2002, when her father brought her to see the 2002 All-Ireland Senior Ladies' Football Championship final. Between 2009 and 2015 she attended University College Dublin on a sports scholarship and studied medicine.

== Career ==
In 2015, Healy qualified as a doctor. She specialises in anaesthesia. She has trained and worked at various Dublin hospitals including St. Vincent's University Hospital, the Mater, Beaumont Hospital and Holles Street Hospital. On 24 December 2018, while working at Connolly Hospital, Healy responded on Twitter to a comment earlier made by the Taoiseach, Leo Varadkar. Varadkar had suggested that nurses, doctors and healthcare workers in emergency departments should not take holidays during the Christmas/New Year period. Healy tweeted "Three 24 hour shifts in 6 days and 2 in the last three. It cool if I take a day or two off to celebrate Christmas with my fam". In 2019 Healy began working at Cork University Hospital.

== Playing career ==
=== Clubs ===
St Brigid's

Healy began playing Gaelic football when she was nine. She initially played informally on the green in front of her house before asking her mother to take to her local GAA club, St Brigid's. Between 2015 and 2018, Healy played in three Dublin Ladies' Senior Football Championship finals for St Brigid's.

	Season	Championship	Place	Opponent	Goal/Points
1	2015	Dublin	Runner up	Foxrock–Cabinteely	0–0
2	2016	Dublin	Runner up	Foxrock–Cabinteely	0–0
3	2018	Dublin	Runner up	Foxrock–Cabinteely	?

UCD

Between 2009 and 2015, while attending University College Dublin on a sports scholarship, Healy also played for UCD GAA in the O'Connor Cup.

Mourneabbey

In March 2019, after her job as a doctor saw her transfer to Cork University Hospital, Healy switched from St Brigid's to Mourneabbey.

=== Inter-county ===
Together with Niamh McEvoy, Sinéad Goldrick and Hannah Tyrrell, Healy was part of a generation of Dublin ladies' footballers who won All-Ireland titles at under-14, under-16 and under-18 levels before playing for the senior team. Healy began playing for the senior team in 2007 at the age of 16. She was a member of the Dublin team that won the 2010 All-Ireland Senior Ladies' Football Championship final. Heally was a regular in the Dublin team during the 2010s, finishing as an All-Ireland runner-up in 2014, 2015 and 2016. She captained Dublin in the 2016 final. She was subsequently a member of the Dublin teams that won the 2017, 2018, and 2019 All-Ireland finals. In 2017, after she was named Player of the Match in the 2017 final, she was also named the TG4 Senior Player's Player of the Year. She was the first Dublin player to win the award. She was also a member of the Dublin team that won the 2018 Ladies' National Football League. In 2018 Healy collected her fourth All Star award.

	All-Ireland Finals	Place	Opponent	Goal/Points
1	2004 Under-14	Winners	Mayo	0–1
2	2006 Under-16	Winners	Cork	1–1
3	2008 Under-18	Winners	Tyrone	2–3
4	2010 Senior	Winners	Tyrone	0–0
5	2014 Senior	Runner up	Cork	0–2
6	2015 Senior	Runner up	Cork	0–0
7	2016 Senior	Runner up	Cork	0–1
8	2017 Senior	Winners	Mayo	0–0
9	2018 Senior	Winners	Cork	0–0
10	2019 Senior	Winners	Galway	0–1

== Honours ==
Dublin

- All-Ireland Senior Ladies' Football Championship
  - Winners: 2010, 2017, 2018, 2019, 2020: 5
  - Runner up: 2014, 2015, 2016: 3
- Ladies' National Football League
  - 2018
- All-Ireland Under-18 Ladies' Football Championship
  - Winners: 2008
- All-Ireland Under-16 Ladies' Football Championship
  - Winners: 2006
- All-Ireland Under-14 Ladies' Football Championship
  - Winners: 2004

St Brigid's

- Dublin Ladies' Senior Football Championship
  - Runner up: 2015, 2016, 2018: 3

Individual

- TG4 Senior Player's Player of the Year
  - Winner: 2017
- All Stars
  - Winner: 2014, 2016, 2017, 2018: 4
