= Sinéad Goldrick =

Dublin senior ladies' footballer

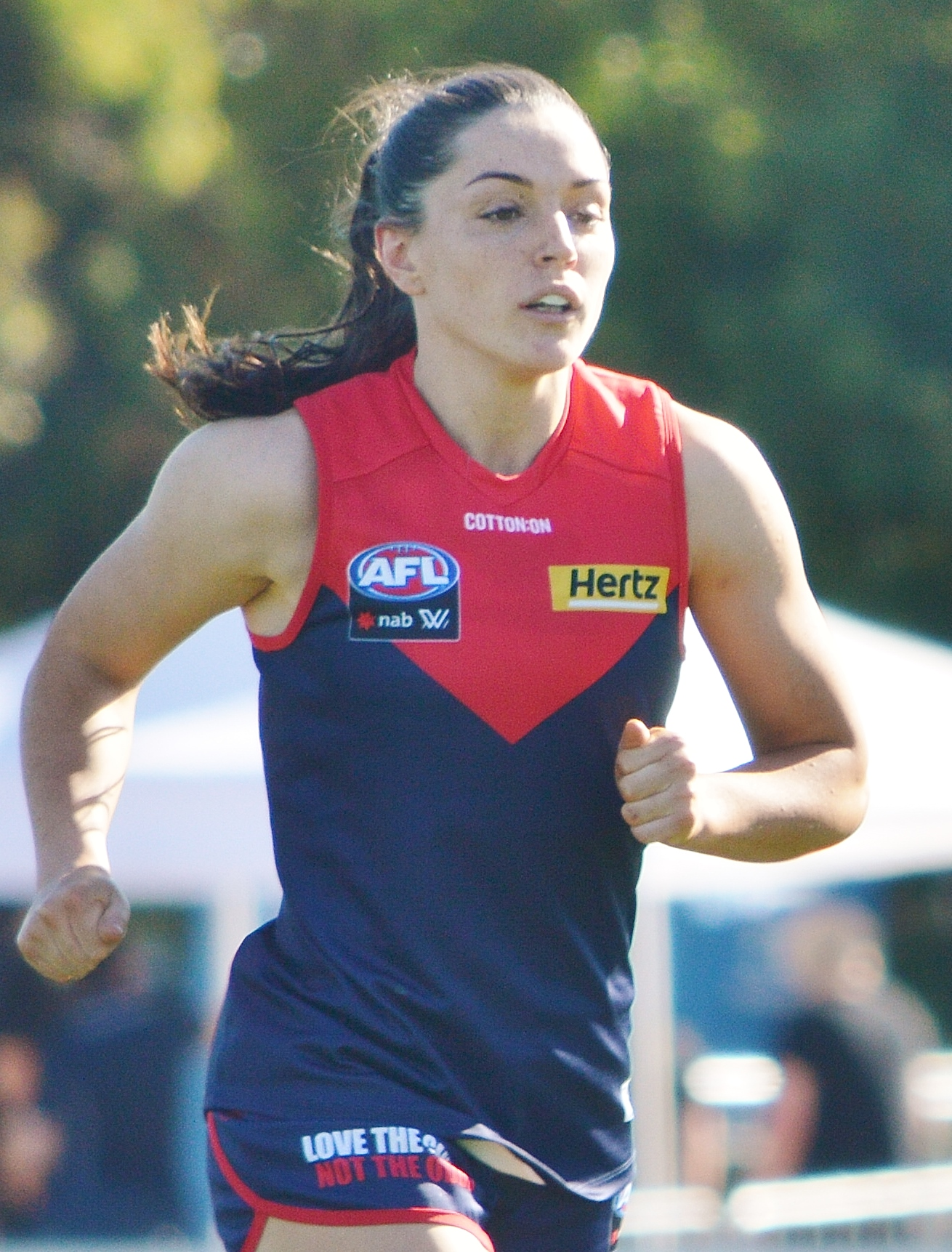
- Goldrick playing Australian rules football with Melbourne in February 2021

Personal information
- Nickname: Goldie
- Born: 2 May 1990 (age 36)
- Height: 5 ft 6 in (1.68 m)

Sport
- Sport: Ladies' Gaelic football
- Position: Right half back
Clubs
- Years: Club
- 200x– 2008–2011 2011–2012: Foxrock–Cabinteely → UCD → DIT
Inter-county
- Years: County
- 2008–: Dublin
Inter-county titles
- All-Irelands: 3
- NFL: 1
- All Stars: 7

Sinéad Goldrick (born 2 May 1990) is an Irish dual code footballer, playing at the highest level in both Gaelic football and Australian rules football. She captained Dublin ladies in the 2014 All-Ireland Senior Ladies' Football Championship final and was a member of the Dublin teams that won the All-Ireland Senior Ladies' Football Championship in 2017, 2018 and 2019. She was also a member of the Dublin team that won the 2018 Ladies' National Football League. In 2019 she won her seventh All Star award. During the 2010s she was also a prominent member of the Foxrock–Cabinteely team that won Dublin and Leinster titles and played in All-Ireland finals. In October 2019 it was announced that Goldrick had agreed to play for Melbourne Football Club of the AFLW in 2020 and she won a premiership with the club in 2022 (AFLW Season 7).

== Early years, family and education ==
Goldrick attended St. Brigid's Girls National School, Cabinteely. Between 2002 and 2008 she completed her secondary level education at Coláiste Íosagáin in Booterstown. In addition to Gaelic football, in her youth she was involved in various sports and activities including gymnastics, Irish dancing and athletics. She also represented Coláiste Íosagáin at basketball, winning multiple All-Ireland titles. She recalls her father taking her to Croke Park for the first time, when she was about 10, to watch a Dublin team, featuring Jason Sherlock, play against Meath in the Leinster Senior Football Championship. Between 2008 and 2011 she attended University College Dublin where she gained a BSc in Social Sciences. Between 2011 and 2012 she attended the Dublin Institute of Technology where she gained a MSc in Marketing.

== Gaelic football ==
=== Clubs ===
Foxrock–Cabinteely

Goldrick began playing for Foxrock–Cabinteely while attending St. Brigid's Girls National School. During the 2010s she was a prominent member of Foxrock Cabinteely teams that won Dublin and Leinster titles and played in All-Ireland finals.

	Season	Championship	Place	Opponent	Goal/Points
1	2012	Dublin	Winners	Na Fianna	?
2	2012	Leinster	Runner up	Shelmaliers	?
3	2014	Dublin	Runner up	Na Fianna	0–1
4	2015	Dublin	Winners	St Brigid's	0–2
5	2015	Leinster	Winners	Sarsfields (Laois)	?
6	2016	Dublin	Winners	St Brigid's	0–0
7	2016	Leinster	Winners	St Laurence's	?
8	2016	All-Ireland	Runner up	Donaghmoyne (Monaghan)	0–0
9	2017	Dublin	Winners	Ballyboden St. Enda's	0–1
10	2017	Leinster	Winners	Confey	0–1
11	2018	Dublin	Winners	St Brigid's	?
12	2018	Leinster	Winners	Sarsfields (Laois)	0–0
13	2018	All-Ireland	Runner up	Mourneabbey	0–1

Intervarsity

While attending University College Dublin and the Dublin Institute of Technology, Goldrick also played for UCD GAA and DIT GAA.

=== Inter-county ===
Together with Niamh McEvoy, Noëlle Healy and Hannah Tyrrell, Goldrick was part of a generation of Dublin ladies' footballers who won All-Ireland titles at under-14, under-16 and under-18 levels before playing for the senior team. Since 2008 she has been a regular member of the Dublin senior panel. However she missed out on the 2010 All-Ireland Senior Ladies' Football Championship final after choosing to go travelling in Thailand. She captained Dublin in the 2014 All-Ireland Senior Ladies' Football Championship final. She was also a member of the Dublin teams that won the 2017, 2018 and 2019 All-Ireland finals. She scored the opening goal for Dublin in the 2019 final. She was a member of the Dublin team that won the 2018 Ladies' National Football League. In 2019 she won her seventh All Star award.

	All-Ireland Finals	Place	Opponent	Goal/Points
1	2004 Under-14	Winners	Mayo	0–1
2	2006 Under-16	Winners	Cork	0–1
3	2008 Under-18	Winners	Tyrone	0–1
4	2014 Senior	Runner up	Cork	0–1
5	2015 Senior	Runner up	Cork	0–0
6	2016 Senior	Runner up	Cork	0–0
7	2017 Senior	Winners	Mayo	0–0
8	2018 Senior	Winners	Cork	0–1
9	2019 Senior	Winners	Galway	1–0

== Australian rules football ==
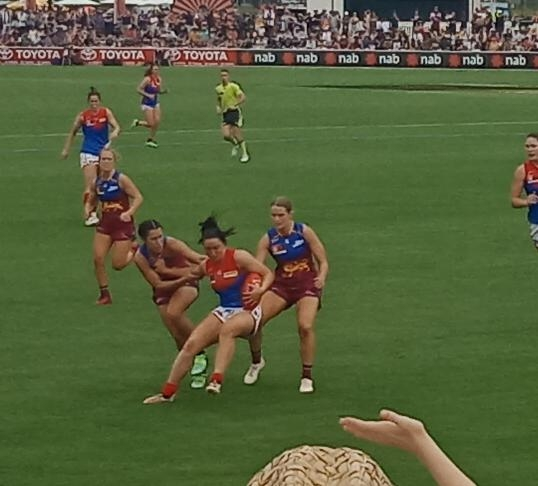
Sinead Goldrick fends off a tackle from Brisbane's Ally Anderson in the AFL Women's season seven Grand Final.

In October 2019 it was announced that Goldrick and her Dublin teammate, Niamh McEvoy, have agreed to play for Melbourne Football Club of the AFLW in 2020. She played all 6 games in her debut year before the 2020 season was cut short, and returned to play in 2021.

== Personal life ==
Between 2013 and 2018 Goldrick worked for Vodafone Ireland in various roles including as a Vodafone Foundation executive and mobile app developer. She has also worked as a brand ambassador for both Lidl and AIG. Goldrick is dating the Dublin and Cuala hurler, David Treacy.

== Honours ==
=== Gaelic football ===
Dublin

- All-Ireland Senior Ladies' Football Championship
  - Winners: 2017, 2018, 2019: 3
  - Runner up: 2014, 2015, 2016: 3
- Ladies' National Football League
  - 2018
- All-Ireland Under-18 Ladies' Football Championship
  - Winners: 2008
- All-Ireland Under-16 Ladies' Football Championship
  - Winners: 2006
- All-Ireland Under-14 Ladies' Football Championship
  - Winners: 2004

Foxrock–Cabinteely

- All-Ireland Ladies' Club Football Championship
  - Runner up: 2016, 2018: 2
- Leinster Ladies' Senior Club Football Championship
  - Winners: 2015, 2016, 2017, 2018: 4
  - Runner up: 2012: 1
- Dublin Ladies' Senior Football Championship
  - Winners: 2012, 2015, 2016, 2017, 2018: 5

Individual

- All Stars
  - Winner: 2012, 2013, 2014, 2015, 2016, 2018, 2019: 7

==== Australian Rules ====
- AFLW premiership player: Season 7 (2022)
