= Niamh McEvoy (footballer, born 1990) =

Gaelic and Australian rules footballer

Personal information
- Born: 2 October 1990 (age 36)
- Occupation: Teacher
- Height: 176 cm (5 ft 9 in)

Sport
- Sport: Ladies' Gaelic football
- Position: Full forward
Clubs
- Years: Club
- 2018–2019: St Sylvester's → DIT
Inter-county
- Years: County
- 2010–: Dublin
Inter-county titles
- All-Irelands: 4
- NFL: 1
- All Stars: 1

Niamh McEvoy (born 2 October 1990) is a senior Dublin ladies' footballer and an Australian rules footballer with Melbourne Football Club in the AFL Women's. McEvoy was a member of the Dublin teams that won the All-Ireland Senior Ladies' Football Championship in 2010, 2017, 2018 and 2019. She was also a member of the Dublin team that won the 2018 Ladies' National Football League.

== Early life and education ==
McEvoy is from Malahide. She recalls attending the 2003 All-Ireland Senior Ladies' Football Championship final when she was 12 with her father, Dave. She attended Malahide Community School where she played ladies' Gaelic football and captained the basketball team. Between 2009 and 2012 she attended Trinity College Dublin where she qualified as a primary school teacher. Between 2018 and 2019 she completed a MSc in Business and Entrepreneurship at Dublin Institute of Technology.

== Gaelic football ==
=== Clubs ===
At club level, McEvoy has played for St Sylvester's and DIT.

=== Inter-county ===
Together with Noëlle Healy, Sinéad Goldrick and Hannah Tyrrell, McEvoy was part of a generation of Dublin ladies' footballers who won All-Ireland titles at under-14, under-16 and under-18 levels before playing for the senior team. McEvoy was a member of the Dublin team that won the 2010 All-Ireland Senior Ladies' Football Championship final. She was one of two players named Niamh McEvoy who played for Dublin in the 2010 final. She came on as a second-half substitute, replacing the player sharing her name, Niamh McEvoy of Parnells. McEvoy established herself as a regular in the Dublin team during the 2010s, finishing as an All-Ireland runner-up in 2014, 2015 and 2016. She was subsequently a member of the Dublin teams that won the 2017, 2018 and 2019 All-Ireland finals. She was a member of the Dublin team that won the 2018 Ladies' National Football League. In 2019 McEvoy won her first All Star award.

	All-Ireland Finals	Place	Opponent	Goal/Points
1	2004 Under-14	Winners	Mayo	1–0
2	2006 Under-16	Winners	Cork	1–0
3	2008 Under-18	Winners	Tyrone	0–0
4	2010	Winners	Tyrone	0–0
5	2014	Runner up	Cork	0–0
6	2015	Runner up	Cork	0–1
7	2016	Runner up	Cork	0–1
8	2017	Winners	Mayo	1–1
9	2018	Winners	Cork	0–1
10	2019	Winners	Galway	0–1

== Australian rules football ==
Niamh McEvoy

Personal information
- Full name: Niamh McEvoy
- Born: 2 October 1990 (age 36)
- Draft: 2019 rookie signing
- Debut: Round 2, 2020, Melbourne vs. Western Bulldogs, at VU Whitten Oval
- Height: 176 cm (5 ft 9 in)

Club information
- Current club: Melbourne
- Number: 17

Playing career^{1}
Years	Club	Games (Goals)
2020–2021	Melbourne	8 (1)
- ^{1} Playing statistics correct to the end of the 2021 season.

In October 2019, McEvoy and her Dublin teammate Sinéad Goldrick signed to play for the Melbourne Football Club in the AFL Women's (AFLW) in 2020. She made her AFL Women's debut in round 2 of the 2020 season against the Western Bulldogs at VU Whitten Oval, after missing the opening round through illness. In April 2021, McEvoy announced her retirement from Australian rules football.

== Personal life ==
Between 2012 and 2018, McEvoy worked as a primary school teacher at schools such as Holywell Educate Together National School in Swords, County Dublin. McEvoy is married and shares two children with footballer Dean Rock.

== Honours ==
Dublin

- All-Ireland Senior Ladies' Football Championship
  - Winners: 2010, 2017, 2018, 2019: 4
  - Runner up: 2014, 2015, 2016: 3
- Ladies' National Football League
  - 2018: 1
- All-Ireland Under-18 Ladies' Football Championship
  - Winners: 2008
- All-Ireland Under-16 Ladies' Football Championship
  - Winners: 2006
- All-Ireland Under-14 Ladies' Football Championship
  - Winners: 2004

Individual

- All Stars
  - Winner: 2019: 1
