= 2018 All-Ireland Intermediate Ladies' Football Championship =

The 2018 All-Ireland Intermediate Ladies' Football Championship was a knock-out competition in the game of Ladies' Gaelic football played by women in Ireland

== Format ==
=== Provincial championships ===
Connacht, Leinster, Munster and Ulster each organise their provincial championship. Each province is a knockout tournament.

=== Group stages ===
The 13 teams are drawn into four groups, each containing three teams: one provincial champion, one provincial finalist, and one provincial semi-finalist.

Each team plays the other teams in its group once. The top two in each group progress to the All-Ireland quarter-finals.

== Fixtures ==
=== Connacht Championship ===
Leitrim were unable to field a team so only 2 teams contested the Connacht Championship

==== Connacht Final ====
24 June 2018; 2:00 pm Final	Roscommon	4-17 - 1-14	Sligo	McHale Park; Referee: Shane Curley (Galway); Man of the Match: Jenny Higgins (Western Gaels)
24 June 2018; 2:00 pm Final	Laura Fleming 2-2, Jenny Higgins 1-2, Sheila Brady 0-5 (0-1f), Joanne Cregg 1-0, Alice Kelly 0-3, Rebecca Finan (0-1f) and Jenny Downey (0-2f) 0-2 each, Sorcha Bruen 0-1	Report	Katie Walsh 1-7 (0-5f), Nicola Brennan 0-2, Lauren Boles, Sarah Reynolds, Elaine O’Reilly, Tara Walsh, Bernie Connolly 0-1 each	McHale Park; Referee: Shane Curley (Galway); Man of the Match: Jenny Higgins (Western Gaels)

=== Leinster Championship ===
==== Leinster Quarter-Finals ====
3 June 2018; Quarter-Final	Offaly	2-9 - 2-15	Laois	Tubber; Referee: Stephen McNulty

3 June 2018; Quarter-Final	Wexford	2-17 - 1-12	Kildare	Wexford Park; Referee: Niall McCormack

3 June 2018; Quarter-Final	Wicklow	2-17 - 2-15	Meath	Roundwood; Referee: Des McEnery

==== Leinster Semi-Finals ====
17 June 2018; 2:00 pm Semi-Final	Wicklow	3-13 - 0-4	Longford	Longford; Referee: Finbarr Shanahan (Dublin)
17 June 2018; 2:00 pm Semi-Final	Meadhbh Deeney 1-4 (0-2f), Laura Hogan 1-2, Marie Kealy 1-0, Amy Murphy 0-3, Claire Walsh 0-2, Sarah Miley and Jackie Kinch 0-1 each	Report	Aoife Darcy 0-2 (0-1f), Emer Heaney and Lauren Burke 0-1 each	Longford; Referee: Finbarr Shanahan (Dublin)

17 June 2018; 2:00 pm Semi-Final	Laois	2-11 - 1-13	Wexford	Bellefield, Enniscorthy; Referee: Jonathan Murphy (Carlow)
17 June 2018; 2:00 pm Semi-Final	Emma Lawlor 1-4, Clare Conlon 0-3 (0-2f), Eva Galvin 1-0, Laura Nerney and Erone Fitzpatrick 0-2 each	Report	Catriona Murray 0-7 (0-4f), Bernie Breen 1-1, Fiona Rochford 0-2, Kellie Kearney, Ellen O'Brien, Aoife Shiel 0-1 each	Bellefield, Enniscorthy; Referee: Jonathan Murphy (Carlow)

==== Leinster Final ====
1 July 2018; 2:00 pm Final	Laois	2-13 - 0-13	Wicklow	Dr. Cullen Park
1 July 2018; 2:00 pm Final	Emma Lawlor 1-3, Clare Conlon 0-4 (0-1f), Meaghan Dunne 1-1 (0-1f), Erone Fitzpatrick and Ciara Burke 0-2 each, Caoimhe Simms 0-1		Laura Hogan 0-4 (0-1f), Meadhbh Deeney 0-3f, Marie Kealy 0-2, Jackie Kinch, Laurie Ahern, Amy Murphy, Rose Fagan 0-1 each	Dr. Cullen Park

=== Munster Championship ===
Clare are the only team that currently competes in Munster at Intermediate. Therefore, they are automatically Munster Champions. They did compete against Junior Champions Limerick as preparation for their group stage games.

17 June 2018; 8:00	Clare	7-15 - 1-3	Limerick	Clarecastle; Referee: Seamus Mulvihill (Kerry); Man of the Match: Laurie Ryan (Banner Ladies)
17 June 2018; 8:00	Cliodhna Blake 3-1, Eimear O'Connor 2-1, Laurie Ryan and Eimear Hillery 1-1 each, Fidelma Marrinan 0-3, Roisin Considine and Niamh O'Dea 0-2 each, Roisin Looney, Caoimhe Harvey, Aine Kelly, Aisling Reidy 0-1 each		Loretta Hanley 1-0, Olivia Giltenane, Katie Heelan, Grainne Cronin	Clarecastle; Referee: Seamus Mulvihill (Kerry); Man of the Match: Laurie Ryan (Banner Ladies)

=== Ulster Championship ===
==== Play-In to Final ====
2 June 2018; 5:00 pm	Tyrone	7-22 - 0-5	Down	Emyvale

==== Ulster Semi-Final ====
9 June 2018; 5:00 pm Semi-Final	Down	5-11 - 1-11	Fermanagh	Healy Park

==== Ulster Final ====
17 June 2018; 1:45 pm Final	Tyrone	6-22 - 1-7	Down	Brewster Park; Referee: Yvonne Duffy (Cavan); Man of the Match: Emma Brennan (Trillick)
17 June 2018; 1:45 pm Final	Maria Canavan 1-8, Chloe McCaffrey 2-3, Emma Brennan, Emma Jane Gervin, Gemma Begley 1-1 each, Grainne Rafferty and Aishling O'Kane 0-2 each, Slainne McCarroll, Niamh Hughes, Emma Hegarty, Niamh O'Neill 0-1 each	Report	Natasha Ferris 1-1, Jess Foy 0-4, Kyla Trainor 0-2	Brewster Park; Referee: Yvonne Duffy (Cavan); Man of the Match: Emma Brennan (Trillick)

=== All-Ireland Group Stage ===
Group games take place on 14, 21 and 28 July 2018.

==== Group 1 ====
Team	Pld	W	D	L	Pts	Diff
Laois	0	0	0	0	0	0
Sligo	0	0	0	0	0	0
Longford	0	0	0	0	0	0

==== Group 2 ====
Team	Pld	W	D	L	Pts	Diff
Tyrone	0	0	0	0	0	0
Wicklow	0	0	0	0	0	0
Offaly	0	0	0	0	0	0

==== Group 3 ====
Team	Pld	W	D	L	Pts	Diff
Clare	0	0	0	0	0	0
Down	0	0	0	0	0	0
Kildare	0	0	0	0	0	0
Wexford	0	0	0	0	0	0

==== Group 4 ====
Team	Pld	W	D	L	Pts	Diff
Roscommon	0	0	0	0	0	0
Fermanagh	0	0	0	0	0	0
Meath	0	0	0	0	0	0

=== All-Ireland Finals ===
==== All-Ireland Quarter-Finals ====
Quarter-Final 1	1st Group 1	v	2nd Group 2

Quarter-Final 2	1st Group 2	v	2nd Group 3

Quarter-Final 3	1st Group 3	v	2nd Group 4

Quarter-Final 4	1st Group 4	v	2nd Group 1

==== All-Ireland Semi-Finals ====
Semi-Final	Winner QF1	v	Winner QF2

Semi-Final	Winner QF3	v	Winner QF4

==== All-Ireland final ====
16 September 2018; Final	v	Croke Park, Dublin
