= Sarah Rowe =

Irish female footballer

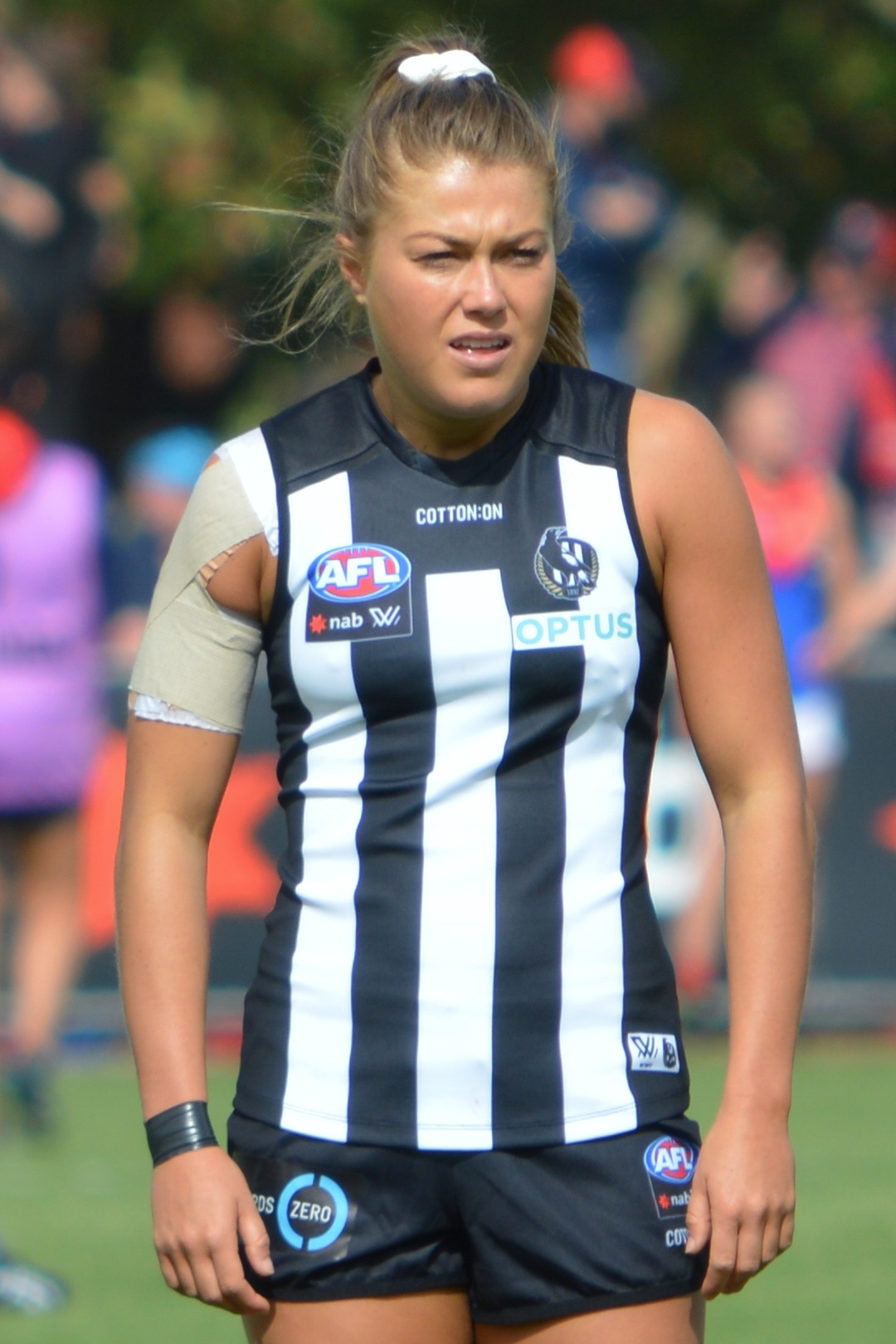
- Rowe playing for Collingwood in 2019

Personal information
- Full name: Sarah Linda Rowe
- Date of birth: 25 July 1995 (age 31)
- Place of birth: Ballina, County Mayo, Ireland
- Height: 1.69 m (5 ft 7 in)
- Position: Midfielder

Youth career
- 200x–2013: St. Mary's Secondary School

Senior career*
Years	Team	Apps	(Gls)
2012–2014	Castlebar Celtic		
2014	Ballina Town		
2014–2015	Raheny United		
2015–2016	Shelbourne		
2021	Shelbourne		
2023	Melbourne Victory	3	(0)
2023	Bohemians	13	(5)
2024–2025	Central Coast Mariners	20	(0)

International career
2012	Republic of Ireland U17		
2012–2014	Republic of Ireland U19		
2015	Republic of Ireland		
- * Club domestic league appearances and goals as of 8 January 2025

Sarah Linda Rowe (born 25 July 1995) is an Irish sportswoman. She currently plays Australian rules football for the Collingwood Football Club in the AFL Women's (AFLW).

She is a former Republic of Ireland women's association football international. In addition to association football, Rowe has also played two other football codes at a senior level. She has played ladies' Gaelic football for Mayo and Australian rules football for Collingwood in the AFLW. At club level, Rowe has played association football for Castlebar Celtic, Raheny United, Shelbourne, Bohemians in the Women's National League and for Melbourne Victory and Central Coast Mariners in the A-League Women. Rowe was a member of the Republic of Ireland U19 team that won their group at the 2014 UEFA Women's Under-19 Championship and qualified for the semi-finals. In 2016, she was also a member of the Shelbourne Ladies team that won a Women's National League/FAI Women's Cup double. In 2023, she returned to association football playing for Melbourne Victory and then for Bohemians. She signed for Central Coast Mariners in 2024.

== Early years, family and education ==
Rowe is from Ballina, County Mayo. She is the daughter of Alan and Grainne Rowe. She has two older sisters, Lorna and Fiona. Her grandfather, Paddy Jordan, was a member of the Mayo squad that won the 1951 All-Ireland Senior Football Championship Final. Her father is involved with Ballina R.F.C., serving as club chairman and club president. He also works for the family business, Rowear, a clothing company specialising in pyjamas. Rowe was educated at The Quay National School and St. Mary's Secondary School. She began playing association football aged seven and Gaelic football aged eight. She credits Hugh Lynn, her school principal at The Quay National School, for encouraging her to develop her sporting potential. Between 2013 and 2018 Rowe attended Dublin City University on a sports scholarship and trained to be a PE and Biology teacher.

== Association football ==
=== Clubs ===
==== St. Mary's Secondary School ====
In 2010 Rowe was a member of the St. Mary's Secondary School team that won the FAI Under-16 Schoolsgirls Cup. Rowe scored twice in the semi-final as St. Mary's defeated St. Caimin's Community School, Shannon 2–0. In the final Rowe scored the winner as St. Mary's defeated Moville Community College 2–1.

==== Castlebar Celtic ====
Rowe played for Castlebar Celtic during the 2012–13 and 2013–14 Women's National League seasons. She was a member of the Celtic team that played in three cup finals, the 2013 and 2014 WNL Cup finals and the 2013 FAI Women's Cup final. On each occasion Celtic finished as runners up. While playing for Celtic, Rowe was also named in the 2012–13 WNL Team of the Year.

==== Ballina Town ====
In 2014 Rowe was a member of the Ballina Town team that won the WFAI Intermediate Cup. Rowe provided an assist and scored Ballina's third goal as they defeated Douglas Hall 3–1 in the final at Turners Cross.

==== Raheny United ====
Rowe played for Raheny United during the 2014–15 Women's National League season and helped the team win the 2015 WNL Cup.

==== Shelbourne Ladies ====
Rowe played for Shelbourne Ladies during the 2015–16 and 2016 Women's National League seasons. She played in the 2015 FAI Women's Cup final but again finished as a runner up. In 2016 she was a member of the Shelbourne Ladies team that won a Women's National League/FAI Women's Cup double.

==== Melbourne Victory ====
In January 2023, Rowe signed with A-League Women club Melbourne Victory, initially on a three-week injury replacement contract for in place of Melina Ayres.

==== Bohemians ====
In February 2023, Rowe returned to her homeland and signed for Bohemians, in the hope of impressing and being selected by Vera Pauw for the national team.

==== Central Coast Mariners ====
In December 2024, Rowe returned to the A-League Women, signing with Central Coast Mariners until the end of the season. Her AFLW club, Collingwood, confirmed that she's still contracted to them too and will return in May 2025 for pre-season training.

=== Republic of Ireland ===
Rowe represented the Republic of Ireland at under-15, under-17 and under-19 levels. Together with Megan Connolly, Savannah McCarthy, Clare Shine and Katie McCabe, Rowe was a member of the Republic of Ireland U19 team that won their group at the 2014 UEFA Women's Under-19 Championship and qualified for the semi-finals. In the qualification campaign she scored the goal against Turkey that secured their place in the finals. On 4 March 2015, Rowe made her senior debut for the Republic of Ireland at the 2015 Istria Cup. She came on as a substitute against Hungary and subsequently provided an assist for Ruesha Littlejohn who scored to earn the Republic of Ireland a 1–1 draw. Rowe was also a member of the Ireland squad at the 2015 Summer Universiade.

== Gaelic football ==
Sarah Rowe
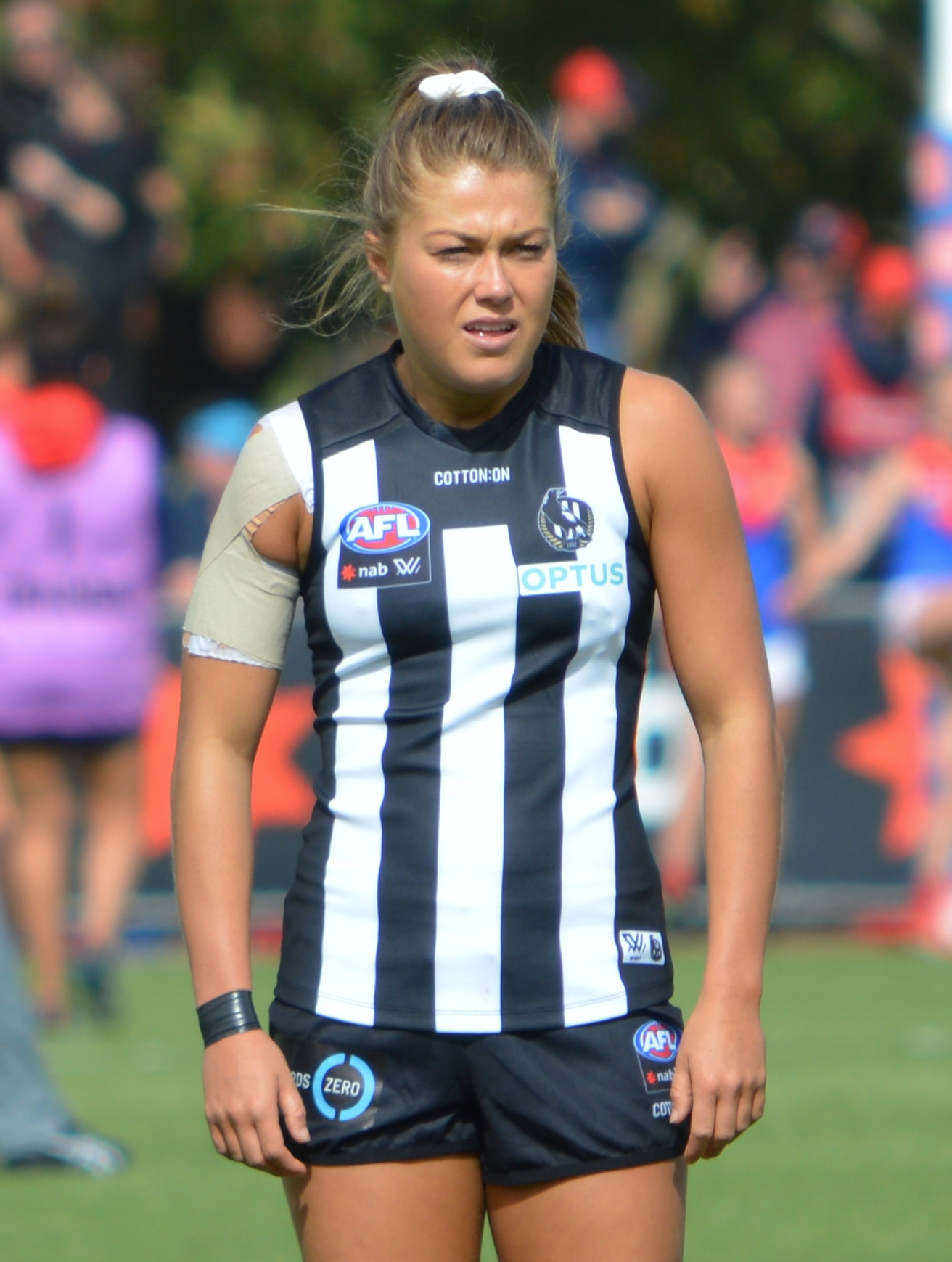

Sport
- Sport: Ladies' Gaelic football
- Position: Left Half Forward
Clubs
- Years: Club
- 2013–2018: Kilmoremoy; DCU
Inter-county
- Years: County
- 2012–2018: Mayo

=== Clubs ===
At club level, Rowe has played for Kilmoremoy and DCU GAA. She has played in two O'Connor Cup finals for DCU, both against the University of Limerick. In 2015 she finished as a runners up. In 2018 she scored 1–3 as DCU won by 2–12 to 0–17.

=== Inter-county ===
Rowe played for Mayo at under-12, under-14, under-16, under-18 and under-21 levels before making her senior debut in 2012, aged 16, against Galway. Rowe has played for Mayo in three Ladies' National Football League finals, losing in 2013 and 2016 to Cork and in 2018 to Dublin. She also played for Mayo in the 2017 All-Ireland Senior Ladies' Football Championship final, losing again to Dublin.

== Australian rules football ==
Sarah Rowe

Personal information
- Draft: Rookie signing, 2018
- Debut: 2 February 2019, Collingwood vs. Geelong, at GMHBA Stadium
- Position: Midfielder

Playing career^{1}
Years	Club	Games (Goals)
2019–	Collingwood	82 (13)

International team honours^{2}
Years	Team	Games (Goals)
2026	Ireland	1 (0)
- ^{1} Playing statistics correct to the end of round 11, 2026.^{2} Representative statistics correct as of 2026.

In August 2018 it was announced that Rowe had signed a five-month, one season contract with Collingwood in the AFLW. On 2 February 2019 Rowe made her AFLW debut for Collingwood in a 24–23 defeat against Geelong at GMHBA Stadium in round 1 of the 2019 season. At the end of the season, Rowe was named Collingwood's Best First Year Player. She signed a contract to play for Collingwood in 2020, though declined a two-season contract so to ensure she could remain available to play for Mayo. Rowe improved her output in most statistical areas and was part of the Magpies team that was narrowly eliminated by North Melbourne in the finals series, shortly before the rest of the season was cancelled outright due to the COVID-19 pandemic. She re-signed with Collingwood again for the 2021 season.

AFLW stats
Statistics are correct at the end of the 2025 AFL Women's season.

Legend
G	Goals	K	Kicks	D	Disposals	T	Tackles
B	Behinds	H	Handballs	M	Marks

Season	Team	No.	Games	Totals							Averages (per game)							Votes
Season	Team	No.	Games	G	B	K	H	D	M	T	G	B	K	H	D	M	T	Votes
2019	Collingwood	7	7	2	2	52	21	73	21	20	0.3	0.3	7.4	3.0	10.4	3.0	2.9	3
2020	Collingwood	7	7	5	1	72	31	103	27	17	0.7	0.1	10.3	4.4	14.7	3.9	2.4	0
2021	Collingwood	7	7	1	2	57	37	94	14	6	0.1	0.3	8.1	5.3	13.4	2.0	0.9	0
2022 (S6)	Collingwood	7	11	1	2	135	50	185	30	23	0.1	0.2	12.3	4.5	16.8	2.7	2.1	3
2022 (S7)	Collingwood	7	11	2	4	82	27	109	18	20	0.2	0.4	7.5	2.5	9.9	1.6	1.8	0
2023	Collingwood	7	10	1	5	152	27	179	28	43	0.1	0.5	15.2	2.7	17.9	2.8	4.3	0
2024	Collingwood	7	11	1	1	155	52	207	27	47	0.1	0.1	14.1	4.7	18.8	2.5	4.3	0
2025	Collingwood	7	11	0	0	133	64	197	32	21	0.0	0.0	12.1	5.8	17.9	2.9	1.9	3
Career			75	13	17	838	309	1147	197	197	0.2	0.2	11.2	4.1	15.3	2.6	2.6	9

== Personal life ==
From 2018 until 2019, Rowe was in a relationship with Seán O'Brien, the retired Ireland rugby union international. This relationship ended because of long distance. She has previously been in a relationship with Aidan O'Shea, who is also a Mayo Gaelic footballer.

== Honours ==
=== Association football ===
Shelbourne Ladies

- FAI Women's Cup
  - Winners: 2016: 1
  - Runners-up: 2015: 1
- Women's National League
  - Winners: 2016
  - Runners-up: 2015–16

Raheny United

- WNL Cup
  - Winners: 2015

Ballina Town

- WFAI Intermediate Cup
  - Winners: 2014

Castlebar Celtic

- FAI Women's Cup
  - Runners-up: 2013: 1
- WNL Cup
  - Runners-up: 2013, 2014: 2

=== Gaelic football ===
Mayo

- All-Ireland Senior Ladies' Football Championship
  - Runner up: 2017
- Ladies' National Football League
  - Runner up: 2012, 2016, 2018: 3

DCU GAA

- O'Connor Cup
  - Winners: 2018: 1
  - Runner up: 2015: 1
