= 2020 All-Ireland Senior Ladies' Football Championship final =

Gaelic sports match

2020 All-Ireland Senior Ladies' Football Final
- Event: 2020 All-Ireland Senior Ladies' Football Championship
Dublin	Cork
1-10	1-5
- Dublin win a fourth consecutive final in what was their seventh final appearance in a row
- Date: 20 December 2020
- Venue: Croke Park, Dublin
- Player of the Match: Jennifer Dunne (Dublin)
- Referee: J Murphy (Carlow)
- Attendance: 0
- Weather: 6 °C, cloudy

The 2020 All-Ireland Senior Ladies' Football Championship final is the 47th All-Ireland Final and the deciding match of the 2020 All-Ireland Senior Ladies' Football Championship, an inter-county ladies' Gaelic football tournament for the county teams of Ireland.

There was no audience due to the COVID-19 pandemic. Cork led by a goal at half-time, but Dublin pushed past them in the second half to win a fourth All-Ireland in a row.

== Match info ==
TG4

20 December 2020
15:30 GMT
Final

Report

Dublin	1-10 (13) – (8) 1-05	Cork
(HT: 0-03 – 1-03)
Gls: C Rowe 1(pen); Pts: C Rowe 3fs, N Healy 2, N Owens 2, A Kane 1, S Aherne 1f, K Sullivan 1		Gls: A O'Sullivan 1 Pts: O Finn 3 (2fs), A O'Sullivan 1, C O'Sullivan 1

Croke Park, Dublin
Referee: J Murphy (Carlow)
Attendance: 0

== See also ==
- List of All-Ireland Senior Ladies' Football Championship finals
