= Mick Bohan =

Gaelic football coach

- Born: Ireland
- Relatives: Harry Bohan (uncle)
Association football career
Managerial career
- Years: Team
- Dublin county football team
- Clare GAA
- Thomas Davis GAA
- Lucan Sarsfields GAA
- Clontarf GAA
- ?-present: Dublin GAA

Mick Bohan is a Gaelic football coach who is working with Dublin GAA. He has worked with the Clare GAA footballers before in the past as well.

== Early life ==
Bohan grew up in Dublin, is nephew of Clare's former boss Harry Bohan and teaches physical education (PE) in Clontarf.

== Coaching career ==
Bohan was a skills coach with Jim Gavin when the Dublin won the 2010, the 2012 All-Ireland Under-21 Football Championship titles, and the 2013 All-Ireland Senior Football Championship title. He was also part of three Sigerson Cup titles for DCU and worked with Dublin clubs Thomas Davis, Lucan Sarsfields and Clontarf.

Bohan went to work in Clare with Colm Collins and helped the team to a National League Division 3 title and an All-Ireland Senior Football Championship quarter-final birth.

Bohan was a frontrunner to replace Anthony Cunningham as manager of the senior Roscommon county team in August 2022. He was also linked with Roscommon when Kevin McStay stepped aside in 2018.
