= All-Ireland Under-16 Ladies' Football Championship =

- Founded: 1976
- Title holders: Kildare (1st title)
- Most titles: Cork (9 titles)

The All-Ireland Under-16 Ladies' Football Championship is a "knockout" competition in the game of Gaelic football played by women in Ireland. The series of games are organised by the Ladies' Gaelic Football Association (Irish: Cumann Peil Gael na mBan) and are played during the summer months. All players have to be under 16 years of age.

== Top winners ==
	Team	Wins	Years won
1	Cork	9	1984, 1986, 2002, 2004, 2005, 2007, 2008, 2013, 2014
2	Waterford	5	1991, 1992, 1995, 1996, 1998
2	Galway	5	2003, 2012, 2017, 2018, 2019
2	Kerry	5	1999, 2010, 2015, 2016, 2025
5	Clare	4	1985, 1987, 1990, 1994
5	Dublin	4	1989, 2006, 2011, 2022
7	Tipperary	3	1978, 1979, 1980
7	Cavan	3	1977, 2023, 2024
7	Wexford	3	1981, 1982, 1983
7	Meath	3	2000, 2001, 2009
11	Mayo	1	1976
11	Laois	1	1988
11	Wicklow	1	1993
11	Monaghan	1	1997
11	Kildare	1	2026

== Roll of honour ==
Year	Winner	Score	Opponent	Score
2026	Kildare	1-10	Cavan	0-09
2025	Kerry	4-17	Mayo	0-05
2024	Cavan	3-11	Mayo	2-05
2023	Cavan	1-09, 2-12 (R)	Cork	0-12, 1-13 (R)
2022	Dublin	4-12	Cork	3-09
2021	No competition			
2020	No competition			
2019	Galway	7-16	Meath	3-10
2018	Galway	3-16	Kerry	3-12
2017	Galway	3-15	Cork	2-11
2016	Kerry	3-21	Dublin	0-10
2015	Kerry	7-15	Galway	3-03
2014	Cork	4-07	Dublin	2-07
2013	Cork	6-09	Dublin	3-05
2012	Galway	3-10	Cork	1-15
2011	Kerry		Dublin	
2010	Dublin	5-12	Kerry	2-15
2009	Meath	4-08	Donegal	3-09
2008	Cork		Galway	
2007	Cork	2-13	Donegal	1-07
2006	Dublin	5-16	Cork	1-10
2005	Cork	4-13	Dublin	2-11
2004	Cork	6-11	Donegal	3-10
2003	Galway	3-13	Cavan	1-11
2002	Cork		Galway	
2001	Meath		Galway	
2000	Meath	3-11	Galway	1-08
1999	Kerry		Meath	
1998	Waterford		Monaghan	
1997	Monaghan		Kerry	
1996	Waterford		Mayo	
1995	Waterford		Monaghan	
1994	Clare		Mayo	
1993	Wicklow		Kerry	
1992	Waterford		Wexford	
1991	Waterford		Roscommon	
1990	Clare		Offaly	
1989	Dublin		Waterford	
1988	Laois		Kerry	
1987	Clare		Mayo	
1986	Cork		Wexford	
1985	Clare		Wexford	
1984	Cork		Wexford	
1983	Wexford		Tipperary	
1982	Wexford		Kerry	
1981	Wexford		Tipperary	
1980	Tipperary		Laois	
1979	Tipperary		Cavan	
1978	Tipperary		Roscommon	
1977	Cavan		Roscommon	
1976	Mayo		Kerry	

== Under-16 B Championship ==
Year	Winner	Score	Opponent	Score
2026	Roscommon	4-14	Laois	0-10
2025	Armagh	7-18	Galway	1-12
2024	Armagh	4-12	Waterford	4-06
2023	Kerry	4-10	Sligo	2-13
2022	Kildare	3-11	Tipperary	1-08
2021	No competition			
2020	No competition			
2019	Longford	4-15	Waterford	3-07
2018	Mayo	11-14	Laois	1-05
2017	Waterford	1-09	Kildare	0-10
2016	Tipperary	3-16	Louth	1-12
2015	Waterford	2-09	Roscommon	3-05
2014	Tipperary	3-16	Laois	2-06
2013	Laois	4-09	Clare	2-13
2012	Cavan	4-11	Tipperary	5-06
2011	Longford	6-14	Tipperary	3-05
2010	Mayo		Wexford	
2009	Tipperary	1-11	Roscommon	0-08

== Under-16 C Championship ==
Year	Winner	Score	Opponent	Score
2026	Clare	3-14	Derry	1-08
2025	Donegal	6-22	Leitrim	4-05
2024	Antrim	1-12	Limerick	1-07
2023	Antrim	3-12	Clare	1-06
2022	Armagh	1-14	Longford	2-04
2021	No competition			
2020	No competition			
2019	Louth	6-18	Sligo	3-12
2018	No competition			
2017	No competition			
2016	Longford	9-05	Derry	3-10
2015	Wexford	4-07	Leitrim	0-04
2014	Offaly		Clare	
2013	No competition			
2012	No competition			
2011	Cork		Mayo	
2010	Galway		Laois	
2009	Dublin		Mayo	

== Sources ==
- List of Under 16 Champions
