= All-Ireland Under-14 Ladies' Football Championship =

- Founded: 1990
- Title holders: Cork (12th title)
- Most titles: Cork (12 titles)

The All-Ireland Under-14 Ladies' Football Championship is a "knockout" competition in the game of Gaelic football played by women in Ireland. The series of games are organised by the Ladies' Gaelic Football Association (Irish: Cumann Peil Gael na mBan) and are played during the summer months. All players have to be under 14 years of age. From 2019 onwards, the competition was re-organised into 4 levels called Platinum, Gold, Silver and Bronze.

== Top winners ==
	Team	Wins	Years won
1	Cork	12	2000, 2001, 2002, 2003, 2006, 2009, 2011, 2012, 2013, 2019, 2025, 2026
2	Kerry	7	1991, 1992, 1993, 1999, 2008, 2014, 2022
3	Dublin	3	2004, 2005, 2007
3	Galway	3	2010, 2017, 2024
5	Mayo	2	1994, 2023
5	Monaghan	2	1995, 1997
5	Cavan	2	2015, 2018
8	Meath	1	1996
8	Waterford	1	1998
8	Wexford	1	1990
8	Kildare	1	2016

== Under 14 Platinum Championship ==
Year	Winner	Score	Opponent	Score
2026	Cork	4-08	Armagh	2-11
2025	Cork	5-09	Galway	2-13
2024	Galway	4-15	Cavan	4-11
2023	Mayo	2-09	Cork	0-07
2022	Kerry	5-12	Cork	5-10
2021	Not Played due to Covid 19 Pandemic			
2020	Not Played due to Covid 19 Pandemic			
2019	Cork	7-15	Galway	2-04

== Under 14 A Championship ==
Year	Winner	Score	Opponent	Score
2018	Cavan	4-06	Dublin	2-09
2017	Galway	6-09	Kerry	1-14
2016	Kildare	3-10	Kerry	2-09
2015	Cavan	0-17	Cork	4-04
2014	Kerry	6-08	Mayo	4-09
2013	Cork	3-15	Kildare	1-06
2012	Cork	2-09	Mayo	0-02
2011	Cork		Dublin	
2010	Galway		Dublin	
2009	Cork		Galway	
2008	Kerry		Galway	
2007	Dublin		Galway	
2006	Cork		Dublin	
2005	Dublin		Donegal	
2004	Dublin		Mayo	
2003	Cork		Mayo	
2002	Cork		Galway	
2001	Cork		Monaghan	
2000	Cork		Mayo	
1999	Kerry		Meath	
1998	Waterford		Meath	
1997	Monaghan		Kerry	
1996	Meath		Monaghan	
1995	Monaghan		Waterford	
1994	Mayo		Kerry	
1993	Kerry		Roscommon	
1992	Kerry		Meath	
1991	Kerry		Clare	
1990	Wexford		Mayo	

== Under-14 Gold Championship ==
Year	Winner	Score	Opponent	Score
2026	Kerry	1-08	Down	1-05
2025	Dublin	4-06	Kerry	1-12
2024	Derry	2-12	Armagh	2-10
2023	Derry	4-09	Tipperary	2-06
2022	Kildare	2-09	Tipperary	0-07
2021	Not Played due to Covid 19 Pandemic			
2020	Not Played due to Covid 19 Pandemic			
2019	Tyrone	5-07	Monaghan	3-06

== Under 14 Silver Championship ==
Year	Winner	Score	Opponent	Score
2026	Derry	3-07	Donegal	1-10
2025	Tipperary	3-08	Cavan	1-15
2024	Offaly	4-05	Donegal	2-06
2023	Down	6-13	Monaghan	0-04
2022	Waterford	5-08	Tyrone	5-07
2021	Not Played due to Covid 19 Pandemic			
2020	Not Played due to Covid 19 Pandemic			
2019	Limerick	3-10	Tipperary	0-05

== Under 14 Bronze Championship ==
Year	Winner	Score	Opponent	Score
2026	Antrim	2-09	Cavan	2-07
2025	Armagh	3-10	Limerick	3-08
2024	Antrim	5-10	Limerick	5-06
2023	Wicklow	4-10	Clare	3-08
2022	Derry	3-20	Offaly	2-07
2021	Not Played due to Covid 19 Pandemic			
2020	Not Played due to Covid 19 Pandemic			
2019	Westmeath	4-17	Derry	1-09

== Under 14 B Championship ==
Year	Winner	Score	Opponent	Score
2018	Mayo	7-10	Tipperary	3-14
2017	Leitrim		Armagh	
2016	Tipperary	4-11	Meath	2-08
2015	Tipperary		Donegal	
2014	Galway		Waterford	
2013	Waterford		Westmeath	
2012	NO CHAMPIONSHIP			
2011	Tipperary		Roscommon	
2010	Wexford		Tipperary	
2009	Clare		Roscommon	
2008	Mayo		Tipperary	

== Outside Sources ==
- Ladies Gaelic Roll of Honour
