= List of Cork senior ladies' football team captains =

List of Cork senior ladies' football team captains features ladies' Gaelic footballers who have captained Cork in All-Ireland Senior Ladies' Football Championship finals and Ladies' National Football League finals.

== List of captains ==
Year	Player	Club	All-Ireland	League
2005	Juliet Murphy	Donoughmore	Winners	Winners
2006	Juliet Murphy	Donoughmore	Winners	Winners
2007	Juliet Murphy	Donoughmore	Winners	
2008	Angela Walsh	Inch Rovers	Winners	Winners
2009	Mary O'Connor	Inch Rovers	Winners	Winners
2010	Rena Buckley	Donoughmore		Winners
2011	Amy O'Shea		Winners	Winners
2012	Rena Buckley ^{(Note 1)}	Donoughmore	Winners	
2013	Ann Marie Walsh		Winners	Winners
2014	Briege Corkery		Winners	Winners
2015	Ciara O'Sullivan	Mourneabbey	Winners	Winners
2016	Ciara O'Sullivan ^{(Note 2)}	Mourneabbey	Winners	Winners
2017	Doireann O'Sullivan	Mourneabbey		Winners
2018	Ciara O'Sullivan	Mourneabbey	Runners Up	
2019	Martina O'Brien	Clonakilty		Winners

== Notes ==
- ^1 Rena Buckley was the first player to captain Cork teams to both the All-Ireland Senior Ladies' Football Championship and the All-Ireland Senior Camogie Championship. In 2012 she captained the Cork senior ladies' football team. In 2017 she captained the Cork senior camogie team.
- ^2 In the 2016 Ladies' National Football League final, Deirdre O'Reilly lifted the trophy in the absence of the injured captain, Ciara O'Sullivan.
