= List of Ladies' Gaelic footballers =

List of Ladies' Gaelic footballers features notable players of ladies' Gaelic football.

== 2010 LGFA/TG4 Team of the Decade ==
Position	Player	County
Goalkeeper	Clíodhna O'Connor	Dublin
Right corner back	Rebecca Hallahan	Waterford
Full back	Angela Walsh	Cork
Left corner back	Rena Buckley	Cork
Right half back	Briege Corkery	Cork
Centre half back	Jenny Greenan	Monaghan
Left half back	Emer Flaherty	Galway
Midfield	Juliet Murphy	Cork
Midfield	Mary O'Donnell	Waterford
Right half forward	Nollaig Cleary	Cork
Centre half forward	Christina Heffernan	Mayo
Left half forward	Tracey Lawlor	Laois
Right corner forward	Valerie Mulcahy	Cork
Full forward	Geraldine O'Shea	Kerry
Left corner forward	Cora Staunton	Mayo

== TG4 Senior Player's Player of the Year ==
Season	Winners	County
2011	Juliet Murphy	Cork
2012	Briege Corkery	Cork
2013	Geraldine O'Flynn	Cork
2014	Caroline O'Hanlon	Armagh
2015	Briege Corkery	Cork
2016	Bríd Stack	Cork
2017	Noëlle Healy	Dublin
2018	Sinéad Aherne	Dublin
2019	Siobhán McGrath	Dublin
2020	Aimee Mackin	Armagh

== 2014 RTÉ Sports Team of the Year ==
In December 2014, after winning their ninth All-Ireland Senior Ladies' Football Championship title, the Cork senior ladies' football team won the RTÉ Sports Team of the Year Award. They were the first female team to win the award. They received 27% of the vote, beating the Ireland men's national rugby union team, winners of the 2014 Six Nations Championship, by 11%.

	Player
1	Martina O'Brien
2	Roisín Phelan
3	Angela Walsh
4	Bríd Stack
5	Vera Foley
6	Deirdre O'Reilly
7	Geraldine O'Flynn
8	Rena Buckley
9	Briege Corkery (c)
10	Annie Walsh
11	Ciara O'Sullivan
12	Orlagh Farmer
13	Valerie Mulcahy
14	Grace Kearney
15	Orla Finn
Sub	Nollaig Cleary
Sub	Rhona Ní Bhuachalla
Sub	Doireann O'Sullivan
Sub	Eimear Scally

== Players who switched codes ==
=== Ladies' Gaelic football to association football ===
Several ladies Gaelic footballers, including All-Ireland finalists, Niamh Fahey and Sarah Rowe, have gone on to represent the Republic of Ireland women's national association football team.

Player	Gaelic football	Association football
Amber Barrett	Donegal	Republic of Ireland
Megan Connolly	Cork ^{(Note 1)}	Republic of Ireland
Marie Curtin	Limerick	Republic of Ireland
Niamh Fahey	Galway	Republic of Ireland
Dora Gorman	Galway	Republic of Ireland
Ciara Grant	Donegal	Republic of Ireland
Una Harkin	Derry	Northern Ireland
Siobhán Killeen	Dublin	Republic of Ireland
Kirsty McGuinness	Antrim	Northern Ireland
Valerie Mulcahy	Cork	Republic of Ireland ^{(Note 2)}
Sarah Rowe	Mayo	Republic of Ireland
Julie-Ann Russell	Galway	Republic of Ireland
Nora Stapleton	Donegal	UCD
Cora Staunton	Mayo	Mayo Ladies League
Hannah Tyrrell	Dublin	St Catherine's/Shamrock Rovers

Notes

- ^1 Megan Connolly represented Cork at under-16 level.
- ^2 Valerie Mulcahy represented Ireland at the 2003 Summer Universiade.

=== Ladies' Gaelic football to Australian rules football ===
Currently on an AFL senior list

Ladies' Gaelic football players in the AFLW
Player	Gaelic football	AFLW team	AFLW debut	Notes
Yvonne Bonner	Donegal	Greater Western Sydney	2019	
Amy Boyle-Carr	Donegal	Adelaide	2024	
Ailish Considine	Clare	Adelaide	2019	
Kayleigh Cronin	Kerry	Adelaide	2025	
Joanne Doonan	Fermanagh	Carlton	2020	
Laura Duryea	Cavan	Melbourne	2017	First Irish player to play in AFLW. First AFLW player to represent Ireland in Australian rules.
Clara Fitzpatrick	Down	St Kilda	2020	
Kate Flood	Louth	Fremantle	2019	
Aileen Gilroy	Mayo	North Melbourne	2020	
Sinéad Goldrick	Dublin	Melbourne	2020	
Katy Herron	Donegal	Western Bulldogs	2020	
Grace Kelly	Mayo	West Coast	2020	
Niamh Kelly	Mayo	West Coast	2020	
Aisling McCarthy	Tipperary	Western Bulldogs	2019	
Niamh McEvoy	Dublin	Melbourne	2020	
Orla O'Dwyer	Tipperary	Brisbane	2020	
Sarah Rowe	Mayo	Collingwood	2019	
Aishling Sheridan	Mayo	Collingwood	2019	
Mairéad Seoighe	Galway	North Melbourne		
Bríd Stack	Cork	Greater Western Sydney	2021	
Cora Staunton	Mayo	Greater Western Sydney	2018	First Irish player actively recruited to AFLW
Áine Tighe	Leitrim	Fremantle		
Bree White	London	Collingwood	2017	

=== Ladies' Gaelic football to camogie ===
Player	Gaelic football	Camogie	Football All Stars	Camogie All Stars
Rena Buckley ^{(Note 1)}	Cork	Cork	6	5
Naomi Carroll ^{(Note 2)}	Clare	Limerick/Clare	0	0
Briege Corkery	Cork	Cork	10	6
Mary Geaney ^{(Note 2)} ^{(Note 3)}	Kerry	Cork	0	0
Michelle Magee ^{(Note 4)}	Antrim	Antrim	0	0
Aisling McCarthy	Tipperary	Cahir GAA	0	0
Mary O'Connor	Cork	Cork	1	3
Fiona O'Driscoll	Cork	Cork	1	1
Rachel Ruddy	Dublin	Dublin	2	0
Angela Walsh	Cork	Cork	6	0

Notes

- ^1 Rena Buckley, was the first player to captain Cork teams to both the All-Ireland Senior Ladies' Football Championship and the All-Ireland Senior Camogie Championship. In 2012 she captained the Cork senior ladies' football team and in 2017 she captained the Cork senior camogie team.
- ^2 Naomi Carroll and Mary Geaney were also Ireland women's field hockey internationals
- ^3 Mary Geaney became the first player to captain a team to both the All-Ireland Senior Ladies' Football Championship and the All-Ireland Senior Camogie Championship. In 1976 she captained Kerry when they won the All-Ireland Senior Ladies' Football Championship. In 1980 she captained the Cork senior camogie team.
- ^4 Michelle Magee is also a Northern Ireland netball international. She played camogie at under-14 level for Antrim.

=== Ladies' Gaelic football to field hockey ===
Player	Gaelic football	Field hockey
Naomi Carroll	Clare	Ireland
Nicola Daly	Dublin	Ireland ^{(Note 1)}
Deirdre Duke	Dublin ^{(Note 2)}	Ireland ^{(Note 1)}
Mary Geaney	Kerry	Ireland
Dora Gorman	Galway	Ireland ^{(Note 3)}
Sarah Hawkshaw	Dublin ^{(Note 4)}	Ireland

Notes

- ^1 Nicola Daly and Deirdre Duke were both members of the Ireland team that won the silver medal at the 2018 Women's Hockey World Cup
- ^2 Deirdre Duke represented Dublin at under-14 level.
- ^3 Dora Gorman represented Ireland at under-16 and under-18 level.
- ^4 Sarah Hawkshaw represented Dublin at under-16 level.

=== Ladies' Gaelic football to netball ===
At the 2015 Nations Cup tournament the Northern Ireland national netball team featured three ladies' Gaelic football inter-county captains – Caroline O'Hanlon (Armagh), Neamh Woods (Tyrone) and Laura Mason (Down). At the 2019 Netball World Cup, of the twelve players that featured in the Northern Ireland squad, seven were ladies' Gaelic footballers. These included O'Hanlon, Woods, Emma Magee, Michelle Magee, Ciara Crosbie, Michelle Drayne and Gemma Lawlor.

Player	Gaelic football	Netball
Ciara Crosbie	Down ^{(Note 1)}	Northern Ireland
Gemma Lawlor	Down	Northern Ireland
Michelle Drayne	Antrim	Northern Ireland
Emma Magee	Antrim	Northern Ireland
Michelle Magee	Antrim	Northern Ireland
Laura Mason	Down	Northern Ireland
Caroline O'Hanlon	Armagh	Northern Ireland
Neamh Woods	Tyrone	Northern Ireland

Notes

- ^1 Ciara Crosbie represented Down at youth level.

=== Ladies' Gaelic football to rugby union ===
Lindsay Peat played for Dublin in the 2009, 2010 and 2014 All-Ireland finals before playing for Ireland in the 2017 Women's Rugby World Cup. The Ireland squad featured at least six other former ladies' inter-county footballers – Niamh Briggs, Claire Molloy, Cliodhna Moloney, Katie Fitzhenry, Nora Stapleton and Hannah Tyrrell.

Player	Gaelic football	Rugby union
Niamh Briggs	Waterford	Ireland
Katie Fitzhenry	Wexford	Ireland
Claire Molloy	Galway	Ireland
Cliodhna Moloney	Galway	Ireland
Lindsay Peat	Dublin	Ireland
Nora Stapleton	Donegal	Ireland
Hannah Tyrrell	Dublin	Ireland
