= 2014 All-Ireland Senior Ladies' Football Championship final =

2014 All-Ireland Senior Ladies' Football Final
- Event: 2014 All-Ireland Senior Ladies' Football Championship
Cork	Dublin
2-13	2-12
- Ninth All-Ireland title in ten years for Cork and the fourth of six titles in a row. First of three successive finals featuring Cork and Dublin
- Date: 28 September 2014
- Venue: Croke Park, Dublin
- Referee: Maggie Farrelly (Cavan)
- Attendance: 27,374

The 2014 All-Ireland Senior Ladies' Football Championship Final featured Cork and Dublin. LGFA president Pat Quill criticised the decision to have Cork and Dublin club championship fixtures occurring on the same day as the game, describing it as "unfair on those people, boyfriends and whatever, not being in a position to come along to support the girls".

Cork came from ten points down to defeat Dublin by 2–13 to 2–12 and win their ninth All-Ireland title. At half-time, Dublin was in control, leading by 1–7 to 0–4 and when Lindsay Peat netted her second goal in the 35th minute, Dublin established a 2–8 to 0–7 lead. With fifteen minutes remaining, Cork trailed by 0–6 to 2–10 and Dublin were on the verge of their second All-Ireland title. However Cork launched a comeback with goals from subs Rhona Ní Bhuachalla and Eimear Scally. The score was level at 2–11 each with seven minutes left. Dublin briefly regained the lead when Siobhán Woods scored a point before Cork levelled with a Ciara O'Sullivan point. Geraldine O'Flynn had the final say with a winning point two minutes from the end.

Dublin manager Gregory McGonigle had previously managed Monaghan in 2011 and 2013. The winning Cork team were later voted winners of the 2014 RTÉ Sports Team of the Year Award. They were the first female team to win the award. They received 27% of the vote, beating the Ireland men's national rugby union team, winners of the 2014 Six Nations Championship, by 11%.

== Match info ==
28 September 2014

Cork	2–13; 2–12	Dublin
Rhona Ní Bhuachalla (2-1); Valerie Mulcahy (0-6); Eimear Scally (1-0); Geraldine O'Flynn (0-3); Orla Finn (0-2); Ciara O'Sullivan (0-1)		Lindsay Peat (2-0); Lyndsey Davey (0-3); Sinéad Aherne (0-3); Noëlle Healy (0-2); Carla Rowe (0-2); Sinéad Goldrick (0-1); Siobhan Woods (0-1)

Croke Park, Dublin
Attendance: 27,374
Referee: Maggie Farrelly (Cavan)

== Teams ==
Manager: Éamonn Ryan Team: 1 Martina O'Brien; 2 Roisín Phelan; 3 Angela Walsh; 4 Bríd Stack; 5 Vera Foley; 6 Deirdre O'Reilly; 7 Geraldine O'Flynn; 8 Rena Buckley; 9 Briege Corkery (c); 10 Annie Walsh; 11 Ciara O'Sullivan; 12 Orlagh Farmer; 13 Valerie Mulcahy; 14 Grace Kearney; 15 Orla Finn Substitutes: Nollaig Cleary for Annie Walsh (half-time); Rhona Ní Bhuachalla for Kearney (42); Doireann O'Sullivan for Farmer (45); Eimear Scally for Finn (50)	Manager: Gregory McGonigle Team: 1 Clíodhna O'Connor; 2 Rachel Ruddy; 3 Sorcha Furlong; 4 Leah Caffrey; 5 Sinead Finnegan; 6 Sinéad Goldrick (c); 7 Siobhán McGrath; 8 Denise Masterson; 9 Molly Lamb; 10 Noëlle Healy; 11 Natalia Hyland; 12 Carla Rowe; 13 Lyndsey Davey; 14 Sinéad Aherne; 15 Lindsay Peat Substitutes: Siobhan Woods for Hyland (45); Sarah McCaffrey for Lamb (53); Lucy Collins for Furlong (54); Niamh McEvoy for Healy (57)
