= 2011 All-Ireland Senior Ladies' Football Championship final =

2011 All-Ireland Senior Ladies' Football Final
- Event: 2011 All-Ireland Senior Ladies' Football Championship
Cork	Monaghan
2-7	0-11
- Sixth All-Ireland title in seven years for Cork and the first of six titles in a row
- Date: 25 September 2011
- Venue: Croke Park, Dublin
- Player of the Match: Angela Walsh
- Referee: John Niland (Sligo)
- Attendance: 20,061

The 2011 All-Ireland Senior Ladies' Football Championship Final featured Cork and Monaghan. This was the second of three All-Ireland Ladies' football finals between 2008 and 2013 that saw Cork play Monaghan. According to a report in the Irish Independent, "just two soft goals separated (Cork) from Monaghan". The first goal came after just 21 minutes when goalkeeper Linda Martin opted for a short kick-out which badly back-fired when Nollaig Cleary intercepted it and chipped her. That goal gave Cork a 1–3 to 0–4 half-time lead. Within 10 minutes of the restart, Monaghan scored three unanswered points, one from Ciara McAnespie and two from Niamh Kindlon. The turning point came when Cork's Orla Finn was rugby tackled by Monaghan's Isobel Kierans which resulted in a penalty. Rhona Ní Bhuachalla subsequently scored from the spot to give Cork a three-point lead. Points from Caoimhe Mohan, Laura McEnaney and Cathriona McConnell pulled it back to a point with just five minutes remaining. However Rena Buckley scored a late point for Cork to see them win by two points.

== Match info ==
25 September 2011

Cork	2–7; 0–11	Monaghan
Nollaig Cleary (1-0); Rhona Ní Bhuachalla (1-0); Juliet Murphy (0-3); Geraldine O'Flynn (0-1); Rena Buckley (0-1); Grace Kearney (0-1); Valerie Mulcahy (0-1)		Catriona McConnell (0-3); Niamh Kindlon (0-3); Ellen McCarron (0-2); Ciara McAnespie (0-1); Caoimhe Mohan (0-1); Laura McEnaney (0-1)

Croke Park, Dublin
Attendance: 20,061
Referee: John Niland (Sligo)

== Teams ==
Manager: Éamonn Ryan Team: 1 Elaine Harte; 2 Ann Marie Walsh; 3 Angela Walsh; 4 Deirdre O'Reilly; 5 Briege Corkery; 6 Bríd Stack; 7 Geraldine O'Flynn; 8 Juliet Murphy; 9 Rena Buckley; 10 Nollaig Cleary; 11 Mairead Kelly; 12 Grace Kearney; 13 Valerie Mulcahy; 14 Rhona Ní Bhuachalla; 15 Amy O'Shea (c) Substitutes: Ciara O'Sullivan for O'Shea (38); Orla Finn for Mulcahy (39); Norita Kelly for Cleary (46); Aine Sheehan for Ní Bhuachalla (53); Annie Walsh for Buckley (55)	Manager: Gregory McGonigle Team: 1 Linda Martin; 2 Grainne McNally; 3 Sharon Courtney (c); 4 Christina Reilly; 5 Aoife McAnespie; 6 Nicola Fahy; 7 Lavina Connolly; 8 Amanda Casey; 9 Cora Courtney; 10 Therese McNally; 11 Ellen McCarron; 12 Catriona McConnell; 13 Ciara McAnespie; 14 Niamh Kindlon; 15 Caoimhe Mohan Substitutes: Isobel Kierans for C. Courtney (25); Laura McEnaney for Kindlon (42); Cora Courtney for McCarron (42); Eileen McElroy for Kierans (50)
