= 2006 All-Ireland Senior Ladies' Football Championship final =

2006 All-Ireland Senior Ladies' Football Final
| Cork | Armagh |
| 1–7 | 1–6 |
- Second of five titles in a row for Cork
- Date: 2 October 2006
- Venue: Croke Park, Dublin
- Player of the Match: Nollaig Cleary
- Referee: Declan Corcoran (Mayo)
- Attendance: 25,665

The 2006 All-Ireland Senior Ladies' Football Championship Final featured Cork and Armagh. Armagh led 1–4 to 0–3 at half-time but a goal from player of the match, Nollaig Cleary, helped Cork to a one-point win. It was also the second of five consecutive All-Ireland finals that Cork would win between 2005 and 2009. The Armagh team featured Caroline O'Hanlon, a Northern Ireland netball international.

== Match info ==
2 October 2006

| Cork | 1–7; 1–6 | Armagh |
|---|---|---|
| Nollaig Cleary (1-2); Mary O'Connor (0-1); Juliet Murphy (0-1); Caoimhe Creedon (0-1); Amanda Murphy (0-1); Geraldine O'Flynn (0-1) | | Mairéad Tennyson (1-1); Maighdlin McAlinden (0-2); Caroline O'Hanlon (0-2); Aileen Matthews (0-1) |

Croke Park, Dublin
Attendance: 25,665
Referee: Declan Corcoran (Mayo)

== Teams ==
| Manager: Éamonn Ryan Team: 1 Elaine Harte; 2 Rena Buckley; 3 Angela Walsh; 4 Briege Corkery; 5 Geraldine O'Flynn; 6 Bríd Stack; 7 S. O'Reilly; 8 Juliet Murphy (c); 9 Norita Kelly; 10 Nollaig Cleary; 11 Deirdre O'Reilly; 12 Amanda Murphy; 13 Valerie Mulcahy; 14 Mary O'Connor; 15 Caoimhe Creedon Substitutes: Mairéad Kelly for Mulcahy (44); Ciara Walsh for A. Murphy (48); Amanda Murphy for Creedon (52) | Manager: Team: 1 F. McAtamney; 2 Caoimhe Marley; 3 Fiona Quinn; 4 Ailish Murphy; 5 R. O’Mahony; 6 Bronagh O'Donnell (c); 7 Sinead McCleary; 8 Alma O'Donnell; 9 Caroline O'Hanlon; 10 Mairéad Tennyson; 11 Sharon Duncan; 12 Shauna O'Hagan; 13 Maighdlin McAlinden; 14 Maria O'Donnell; 15 Aileen Matthews Substitutes: P. McAvoy for Matthews (42); O. Murtagh for Murphy (45); D. Toal for M. O’Donnell (54); Maebh Moriarty for Duncan (58) |
