= 2008 All-Ireland Senior Ladies' Football Championship final =

2008 All-Ireland Senior Ladies' Football Final
Cork	Monaghan
4–13	0–11
- Fourth of five titles in a row for Cork
- Date: 28 September 2008
- Venue: Croke Park, Dublin
- Referee: Keith Tighe (Dublin)
- Attendance: 20,015

The 2008 All-Ireland Senior Ladies' Football Championship Final featured Cork and Monaghan. This was the first of three All-Ireland Ladies' football finals between 2008 and 2013 that saw Cork play Monaghan. They would also play each other in 2011. Cork won a fourth successive All-Ireland title. Valerie Mulcahy scored 3–2, including two penalties, as Cork defeated Monaghan by 14 points. Mulcahy provided the game's opening score, a penalty in the third minute, following Christina Reilly's foul on Mary O'Connor. Although Monaghan would get back to within a point of Cork on three separate occasions, they subsequently trailed all the way to the finish. At half-time, just three points separated the sides, with Cork leading by 1–8 to 0–8. The crucial goal for Cork came five minutes after half-time, when Mulcahy palmed home a disputed second goal to open up a 2–8 to 0–8 lead. Any faint hopes of a Monaghan revival ended when substitute Ciara O'Sullivan scored a goal with her first touch of the game. Five minutes from the end, Mulcahy completed her hat-trick of goals when she netted a second penalty. Aside from Mulcahy and O'Sullivan, other notable performers for Cork included Juliet Murphy in midfield who scored 0–3, substitute Rhona Buckley, who scored 0–2 and Briege Corkery who produced a fantastic diving block midway through the second half to prevent a Monaghan goal.

== Match info ==
28 September 2008

Cork	4–13; 0–11	Monaghan
Valerie Mulcahy (3-2); Ciara O'Sullivan (1-0); Juliet Murphy (0-3); Nollaig Cleary (0-2); Mary O'Connor (0-2); Rhona Buckley (0-2); Amanda Murphy (0-1); Amy O'Shea (0-1)		Edel Byrne (0-3); Catriona McConnell (0-3); Therese McNally (0-2); Isobel Kierans (0-1); Niamh Kindlon (0-1); Ciara McAnespie (0-1)

Croke Park, Dublin
Attendance: 20,015
Referee: Keith Tighe (Dublin)

== Teams ==
Manager: Éamonn Ryan Team: 1 Elaine Harte; 2 Ciara Walsh; 3 Angela Walsh (c); 4 Linda Barrett; 5 Briege Corkery; 6 Bríd Stack; 7 Geraldine O'Flynn; 8 Juliet Murphy; 9 Norita Kelly; 10 Nollaig Cleary; 11 Mary O'Connor; 12 Deirdre O'Reilly; 13 Valerie Mulcahy; 14 Amy O'Shea; 15 Amanda Murphy Substitutes: Rena Buckley for C. Walsh (29); Ciara O'Sullivan for O'Reilly (41); Rhona Buckley for A. Murphy (48); Róisín O'Sullivan for O'Shea (54); S. O'Reilly for Cleary (55)	Manager: John McAleer Team: 1 Linda Martin; 2 Grainne McNally; 3 Sharon Courtney; 4 Christina Reilly; 5 Aoife McAnespie; 6 Angela Lennon; 7 Fiona Courtney; 8 Amanda Casey; 9 Isobel Kierans; 10 Catriona McConnell; 11 Niamh Kindlon (c); 12 Therese McNally; 13 Ciara McAnespie; 14 Edel Byrne; 15 Nicola Fahy Substitutes: Lavina Connolly for Lennon (44); Cora Courtney for McConnell (48); Ellen McCarron for Fahy (51); U. McNally for Reilly (54)
