= 2013 All-Ireland Senior Ladies' Football Championship final =

2013 All-Ireland Senior Ladies' Football Final
- Event: 2013 All-Ireland Senior Ladies' Football Championship
Cork	Monaghan
1-10	1-9
- Eighth All-Ireland title in nine years for Cork and the third of six titles in a row
- Date: 29 September 2013
- Venue: Croke Park, Dublin
- Referee: John Niland (Sligo)
- Attendance: 25,103
- Weather: Sunny

The 2013 All-Ireland Senior Ladies' Football Championship Final featured Cork and Monaghan. This was the third of three All-Ireland Ladies' football finals between 2008 and 2013 that saw Cork play Monaghan. They had also met in the 2011 final. Cork claimed their eighth All-Ireland title in nine years after they got the better of Monaghan by 1–10 to 1–9. Cork led 1–6 to 0–6 at half-time thanks to a Valerie Mulcahy goal. A second half penalty goal from their goalkeeper, Linda Martin, helped Monaghan lead by a point with eight minutes remaining but Juliet Murphy and Mulcahy added late points as Cork edged it by a solitary point. The match was broadcast live on TG4.

== Match info ==
29 September 2013

Cork	1–10; 1–9	Monaghan
Valerie Mulcahy (1-4); Juliet Murphy (0-2); Nollaig Cleary (0-2); Geraldine O'Flynn (0-1); Annie Walsh (0-1)		Catriona McConnell (0-4); Linda Martin (1-0); Caoimhe Mohan (0-2); Laura McEnaney (0-1); Therese McNally (0-1); Ciara McAnespie (0-1)

Croke Park, Dublin
Attendance: 25,103
Referee: John Niland (Sligo)

== Teams ==
Manager: Éamonn Ryan Team: 1 Elaine Harte; 2 Ann Marie Walsh (c); 3 Angela Walsh; 4 Bríd Stack; 5 Briege Corkery; 6 Rena Buckley; 7 Geraldine O'Flynn; 8 Deirdre O'Reilly; 9 Juliet Murphy; 10 Nollaig Cleary; 11 Annie Walsh; 12 Doireann O'Sullivan; 13 Ciara O'Sullivan; 14 Valerie Mulcahy; 15 Rhona Ní Bhuachalla Substitutes: Orlagh Farmer for Ní Bhuachalla (half time); Orla Finn for Annie Walsh (49); Rhona Ní Bhuachalla for Farmer (52); A Barrett for Ann Marie Walsh (60)	Manager: Gregory McGonigle Team: 1 Linda Martin; 2 Grainne McNally; 3 Sharon Courtney; 4 Christina Reilly; 5 Laura McEnaney; 6 Ellen McCarron; 7 Aoife McAnespie; 8 Amanda Casey; 9 Y. Connell; 10 Therese McNally (c); 11 Caoimhe Mohan; 12 Cora Courtney; 13 Catriona McConnell; 14 Eileen McKenna; 15 Ciara McAnespie Substitutes: Eileen McElroy for Aoife McAnespie (half time); Niamh Kindlon for Mohan (56)
