= 2005 All-Ireland Senior Ladies' Football Championship final =

2005 All-Ireland Senior Ladies' Football Final
Cork	Galway
1–11	0–8
- First of five titles in a row for Cork
- Date: 2 October 2005
- Venue: Croke Park, Dublin
- Player of the Match: Valerie Mulcahy
- Referee: Tony Clarke (Dublin)
- Attendance: 23,358

The 2005 All-Ireland Senior Ladies' Football Championship Final featured Cork and Galway. It was Cork's first final and Galway's second. Galway were also the reigning champions, having won the 2004 final. Galway led 0–4 to 0–3 at half-time, but Player of the Match, Valerie Mulcahy, subsequently scored 1–5 to help Cork win their first All-Ireland title. Cork eventually won 1–11 to 0–8. It was also the first of five consecutive All-Ireland finals that Cork would win between 2005 and 2009.

The Galway team featured Annette Clarke as well as Claire Molloy, a future Ireland women's rugby union international, and Niamh Fahey, a future Republic of Ireland women's association football international.

== Match info ==
2 October 2005

Cork	1–11; 0–8	Galway
Valerie Mulcahy (1-5); Nollaig Cleary (0-3); Deirdre O'Reilly (0-2); Briege Corkery (0-1)		Niamh Fahey (0-3); Philomena Ni Fhlatharta (0-2); Niamh Duggan (0-2); Patricia Gleeson (0-1)

Croke Park, Dublin
Attendance: 23,358
Referee: Tony Clarke (Dublin)

== Teams ==
Cork; Manager: Éamonn Ryan Team: 1 Elaine Harte; 2 Bríd Stack; 3 Angela Walsh; 4 Rena Buckley; 5 Briege Corkery; 6 Ciara Walsh; 7 S. O'Reilly; 8 Juliet Murphy (c); 9 Norita Kelly; 10 Amanda Murphy; 11 Regina Curtin; 12 Nollaig Cleary; 13 Valerie Mulcahy; 14 Caoimhe Creedon; 15 Geraldine O'Flynn Substitutes: Mary O'Connor for O’Flynn (27); Deirdre O'Reilly for Creedon (40); A O'Connor for Curtin (55); N Keohane for A. Murphy (62)	Galway; Manager: Richard Bowles Team: 1 Una Carroll; 2 M. Glynn; 3 Ruth Stephens; 4 Anne-Marie McDonough; 5 Marie O'Connell; 6 Aoibheann Daly (c); 7 Emer Flaherty; 8 Annette Clarke; 9 Edel Concannon; 10 Geraldine Conneally; 11 Niamh Duggan; 12 Philomena Ni Fhlatharta; 13 Rebecca McPhilbin; 14 Niamh Fahey; 15 Lorna Joyce Substitutes: Patricia Gleeson for Joyce (41); Claire Molloy for McDonough (44); Lisa Cohill for McPhilbin (52)
