= 2012 All-Ireland Senior Ladies' Football Championship final =

2012 All-Ireland Senior Ladies' Football Final
- Event: 2012 All-Ireland Senior Ladies' Football Championship
Cork	Kerry
0-16	0-7
- Seventh All-Ireland title in eight years for Cork and the second of six titles in a row
- Date: 7 October 2012
- Venue: Croke Park, Dublin
- Referee: Gavin Corrigan (Down)
- Attendance: 16,998

The 2012 All-Ireland Senior Ladies' Football Championship Final featured Cork and Kerry. Kerry were playing in their first All-Ireland final since 1993. This was the first time Kerry lost an All-Ireland final. Meanwhile Cork maintained their unbeaten record in All-Ireland finals. At half-time Cork led by 0–10 to 0–3.

== Match info ==
7 October 2012

Cork	0–16; 0–7	Kerry
Valerie Mulcahy (0-7); Doireann O'Sullivan (0-4); Geraldine O'Flynn (0-2); Briege Corkery (0-1); Orlagh Farmer (0-1); Nollaig Cleary (0-1)		Sarah Houlihan (0-3); Lorraine Scanlon (0-2); Louise Ní Mhuircheartaigh (0-1); Patrice Dennehy (0-1)

Croke Park, Dublin
Attendance: 16,998
Referee: Gavin Corrigan (Down)

== Teams ==
Manager: Éamonn Ryan Team: 1 Elaine Harte; 2 Ann Marie Walsh; 3 Bríd Stack; 4 Deirdre O'Reilly; 5 Briege Corkery; 6 Rena Buckley (c); 7 Geraldine O'Flynn; 8 Juliet Murphy; 9 Norita Kelly; 10 Orlagh Farmer; 11 Doireann O'Sullivan; 12 Ciara O'Sullivan; 13 Nollaig Cleary; 14 Valerie Mulcahy; 15 Rhona Ní Bhuachalla Substitutes: Angela Walsh for Ann Marie Walsh (38); Orla Finn for Ní Bhuachalla (38); Laura McMahon for Farmer (46); A. Hutchings for Kelly (53); Annie Walsh for C. O'Sullivan (57)	Manager: William O'Sullivan Team: 1 Edel Murphy; 2 Cait Lynch; 3 Aislinn Desmond; 4 Aoife Lyons; 5 Julie Brosnan; 6 Aisling Leonard; 7 Lousie Galvin; 8 Emma Sherwood; 9 Bernie Breen (c); 10 Caroline Kelly; 11 Deirdre Corridan; 12 Sarah Houlihan; 13 Megan O'Connell; 14 Lorraine Scanlon; 15 Louise Ní Mhuircheartaigh Substitutes: Patrice Dennehy for Corridan (24); M. Fitzgerald for Galvin (44); Deirdre Corridan for O'Connell (58); S.J. Joy for Sherwood (58)
