= Rena Buckley =

Cork dual Gaelic football/camogie player

Personal information
- Native name: Ríona Ní Bhuachalla (Irish)
- Born: 1986 or 1987 (age 39–40) County Cork, Ireland
- Occupation: Physiotherapist

Sport
- Sport: Ladies' Gaelic football Camogie
- Position: Back/Midfield
Clubs
- Years: Club
- 2005–2009: Inniscarra; Donoughmore; UCD
Inter-county
- Years: County
- 2003–2017 2004–2018: Cork (F); Cork (C)
Inter-county titles
- All-Irelands: 18
- All Stars: 11

Rena Buckley is an Irish sportswoman who played at senior level for both the Cork county ladies' football team and the Cork county camogie team. She has also represented Munster in the Gael Linn Cup and Ireland at international rules. Between 2005 and 2017 she won 18 All-Ireland winners medals - the most All-Ireland senior medals any one person has ever won - making her one of the most decorated sportspeople in Gaelic games. In 2012 she captained Cork when they won the All-Ireland Senior Ladies' Football Championship and in 2017 she captained Cork when they won the All-Ireland Senior Camogie Championship. She was the first player to captain Cork to both All-Ireland senior championships. She was also named as an All Star on eleven occasions. In 2015 Buckley and her teammate and fellow dual player, Briege Corkery, were named joint winners of the 2015 The Irish Times/ Sport Ireland Sportswoman of the Year Award.

== Early years, family and education ==
Rena Buckley is the daughter of Tim and Ellen Buckley. Her hometown is Berrings, Inniscarra. Between 1999 and 2005 she attended St. Aloysius School in Cork. Between 2005 and 2009 she attended University College Dublin where she gained a BSc in Physiotherapy and Performance Science. In 2017–18 she returned to UCD and completed a MSc in Sports Physiotherapy. In 2019 she was awarded an Honorary Doctorate by University College Cork. In 2015, she was awarded the UCD Alumni Award for Physiotherapy.

== Playing career ==
=== Clubs ===
At club level Buckley plays ladies' Gaelic football for Donoughmore and camogie for Inniscarra. Between 2005 and 2009, while attending University College Dublin, she also played camogie and ladies football for UCD GAA and featured in four successive Ashbourne Cup finals, finishing on winning teams in 2007 and 2008. She was part of an O'Connor Cup winning team in 2006.

=== Inter-county ===
==== Ladies' Gaelic football ====
Between 2003 and 2017 Buckley played for the Cork county ladies' football team. Together with Valerie Mulcahy, Juliet Murphy and Briege Corkery she was a member of the Cork team that won eleven All-Ireland Senior Ladies' Football Championships between 2005 and 2016. In 2010 Buckley captained Cork when they won the Ladies' National Football League title and in 2012 she was captain when they won the All-Ireland title. In the 2016 All-Ireland Senior Ladies' Football Championship final she was named Player of the Match. In 2017 she retired from the Cork senior ladies' football team.

==== Camogie ====
Between 2004 and 2018 Buckley played for the Cork county camogie team. Together with Gemma O'Connor, Anna Geary, Ashling Thompson and Briege Corkery she was a member of the Cork team that won seven All-Ireland Senior Camogie Championships between 2005 and 2017. She captained Cork when they won the 2017 All-Ireland Senior Camogie Championship Final. In 2018 Buckley announced she was retiring from the Cork senior camogie team.

==== All-Ireland Finals ====
Between 2005 and 2017, while playing for the Cork county ladies' football team and the Cork county camogie team, Buckley won 18 All-Ireland winners medals, making her one of the most decorated sportspeople in Gaelic games. In 2012 she captained Cork when they won the All-Ireland Senior Ladies' Football Championship and in 2017 she captained Cork when they won the All-Ireland Senior Camogie Championship. She was the first player to captain Cork to both All-Ireland championships and, after Mary Geaney, she became only the second player to captain a team to both All-Ireland championships. On six occasions she helped Cork win the Double, after they won both All-Ireland championships in the same year. In total she played in 22 All-Ireland finals. On four occasions she finished as a runner-up, all with the Cork senior camogie team. In 2015 Buckley and her teammate and fellow dual player, Briege Corkery, both broke the record for most individual All-Ireland medals, overtaking the 15 won by the Dublin camogie player, Kathleen Mills. In December 2015 Buckley and Corkery were named joint winners of the 2015 The Irish Times/ Sport Ireland Sportswoman of the Year Award in recognition of there achievement.

Cork won the Double, winning both All-Ireland championships in the same year.

	Final	Place	Opponent
1	2004 All-Ireland Senior Camogie Championship Final	Runners Up	Tipperary
2	2005 All-Ireland Senior Camogie Championship Final	Winners	Tipperary
3	2005 All-Ireland Senior Ladies' Football Championship final	Winners	Galway
4	2006 All-Ireland Senior Camogie Championship Final	Winners	Tipperary
5	2006 All-Ireland Senior Ladies' Football Championship final	Winners	Armagh
6	2007 All-Ireland Senior Camogie Championship Final	Runners Up	Wexford
7	2007 All-Ireland Senior Ladies' Football Championship final	Winners	Mayo
8	2008 All-Ireland Senior Camogie Championship Final	Winners	Galway
9	2008 All-Ireland Senior Ladies' Football Championship final	Winners	Monaghan
10	2009 All-Ireland Senior Camogie Championship Final	Winners	Kilkenny
11	2009 All-Ireland Senior Ladies' Football Championship final	Winners	Dublin
12	2011 All-Ireland Senior Ladies' Football Championship final	Winners	Monaghan
13	2012 All-Ireland Senior Camogie Championship Final	Runners Up	Wexford
14	2012 All-Ireland Senior Ladies' Football Championship final	Winners	Kerry
15	2013 All-Ireland Senior Ladies' Football Championship final	Winners	Monaghan
16	2014 All-Ireland Senior Camogie Championship Final	Winners	Kilkenny
17	2014 All-Ireland Senior Ladies' Football Championship final	Winners	Dublin
18	2015 All-Ireland Senior Camogie Championship Final	Winners	Galway
19	2015 All-Ireland Senior Ladies' Football Championship final	Winners	Dublin
20	2016 All-Ireland Senior Camogie Championship Final	Runners Up	Kilkenny
21	2016 All-Ireland Senior Ladies' Football Championship final	Winners	Dublin
22	2017 All-Ireland Senior Camogie Championship Final	Winners	Kilkenny

=== International rules football ===
Buckley was a member of the Ireland women's international rules football team that played against Australia in the 2006 Ladies International Rules Series.

== Personal life ==
Buckley is a member of the Irish Society of Chartered Physiotherapists. In 2013 she became a partner in a physiotherapy centre in Muskerry, County Cork. Since September 2015 she has operated her own clinic in Macroom. Her clinic are the club physiotherapists for several local GAA clubs including Naomh Abán. In May 2021, Buckley married her longtime partner, the Freemount GAA player, Páidí Collins.

== Honours ==
=== Ladies' Gaelic football ===
Cork

- All-Ireland Senior Ladies' Football Championship
  - Winners: 2005, 2006, 2007, 2008, 2009, 2011, 2012, 2013, 2014, 2015, 2016: 11
- Ladies' National Football League
  - 2005, 2006, 2008, 2009, 2010, 2011, 2013, 2014, 2015, 2016, 2017: 11
- RTÉ Sports Team of the Year Award
  - 2014

=== Camogie ===
Cork

- All-Ireland Senior Camogie Championship
  - Winners: 2005, 2006, 2008, 2009, 2014, 2015, 2017: 7
  - Runners-up: 2004, 2007, 2012, 2016: 4
- National Camogie League
  - Winners: 2006, 2007, 2012: 3

UCD

- Ashbourne Cup
  - Winners: 2007, 2008: 2
  - Runners-up: 2006, 2009: 2

=== Individual ===
- The Irish Times/ Sport Ireland Sportswoman of the Year
  - 2015
- Ladies' Gaelic Football All Stars Awards
  - Winner: 2004, 2006, 2007, 2011, 2012, 2015: 6
- Camogie All Stars
  - Winner: 2006, 2007, 2014, 2015, 2017: 5
