= 2007 All-Ireland Senior Ladies' Football Championship final =

2007 All-Ireland Senior Ladies' Football Final
Cork	Mayo
2–11	2–6
- Third of five titles in a row for Cork
- Date: 23 September 2007
- Venue: Croke Park, Dublin
- Player of the Match: Bríd Stack
- Referee: Eugene O'Hare (Down)

The 2007 All-Ireland Senior Ladies' Football Championship Final featured Cork and Mayo. Cork completed a three in a row of All-Ireland titles. Valerie Mulcahy scored 2–1 as Cork won 2–11 to 2–6. Mulcahy scored her first goal from the penalty spot just before half time. The decision to award the penalty was described as "questionable" and was only confirmed after the referee, Eugene O'Hare, consulted with his umpires. The penalty gave Cork a 1–6 to 0–3 half time lead. Cork were leading by 12 points when Cora Staunton and Fiona McHale scored two goals in the final minute, making the final score look more respectable for Mayo.

In addition to playing ladies Gaelic football, several members of the Mayo squad including Yvonne Byrne, Aoife Herbert and Cora Staunton, also played women's association football for the Mayo Ladies League XI that won the 2006 FAI Women's Cup and then represented the Republic of Ireland in the 2007–08 UEFA Women's Cup.

== Match info ==
23 September 2007

Cork	2–11; 2–6	Mayo
Valerie Mulcahy (2-1); Amanda Murphy (0-3); Geraldine O'Flynn (0-3); Nollaig Cleary (0-2); Deirdre O'Reilly (0-1); Juliet Murphy (0-1)		Cora Staunton (1-2); Fiona McHale (1-0); Diane O'Hora (0-2); Caroline McGing (0-1); M Kelly (0-1)

Croke Park, Dublin
Referee: Eugene O'Hare (Down)

== Teams ==
Manager: Éamonn Ryan Team: 1 Elaine Harte; 2 Ciara Walsh; 3 Angela Walsh; 4 Rena Buckley; 5 Linda Barrett; 6 Bríd Stack; 7 Briege Corkery; 8 Juliet Murphy (c); 9 Norita Kelly; 10 Geraldine O'Flynn; 11 Laura McMahon; 12 Nollaig Cleary; 13 Valerie Mulcahy; 14 Amanda Murphy; 15 Deirdre O'Reilly Substitutes: Rhona Buckley for Kelly (ht); Mairéad Kelly for McMahon (48); S. O'Reilly for Ciara Walsh (56); Amy O'Shea for Cleary (56)	Manager: Frank Browne Team: 1 Yvonne Byrne; 2 Sharon McGing; 3 Helena Lohan; 4 N O'Shea; 5 Marcella Heffernan; 6 Martha Carter; 7 Caroline McGing; 8 Claire O'Hara; 9 Ciara McDermott; 10 Fiona McHale; 11 Cora Staunton; 12 Claire Egan; 13 Aoife Herbert; 14 Chris Heffernan (c); 15 Diane O'Hora Substitutes: L Cafferkey for Herbert (28); M Kelly for O’Shea (ht); J Moran for McDermott (50)
