= Ladies' Gaelic Football All Stars Awards =

- Sponsored by: TG4
- Country: Republic of Ireland; Northern Ireland
- Presented by: Ladies' Gaelic Football Association
- First award: 1980

Highlights
- Most awards: Mary J. Curran (Kerry); Cora Staunton (Mayo) (11 awards each)
- Website: ladiesgaelic.ie
- Related: Senior Player's Player of the Year; Intermediate Player's Player of the Year; Junior Player's Player of the Year; GAA GPA All Stars Awards; Camogie All Stars Awards; Rounders All Stars Awards

The Ladies' Gaelic Football All Stars Awards have been hosted annually by the Ladies' Gaelic Football Association since 1980. TG4 sponsors it. O'Neills have also helped sponsor the awards. All Stars are awarded to the best ladies' Gaelic football players in each of the fifteen playing positions, effectively forming an All Star team. Between 1980 and 2002 the All Stars played an annual exhibition game against the winners of the All-Ireland Senior Ladies' Football Championship. Since 2004 the LGFA have organised bi-annual overseas exhibition games featuring two All Star selections. Since 2011 the LGFA has also organised three Player's Player of the Year awards, one each for the Senior, Intermediate and Junior All-Ireland Championships. These awards are announced and presented at the same ceremony as the All Stars. Mary J. Curran of Kerry and Cora Staunton of Mayo hold the all-time record for winning the most All Stars.

== All Star Teams ==
Season	All Star Team
1980	1. Martina McGuire (Cavan); 2. Ann Maher (Tipperary) 3. Eileen O'Connor (Kerry) 4. Nuala Egan (Roscommon) 5. Bernadette Stankard (Galway) 6. Rose Dunican (Offaly) 7. Mary Troy (Laois); 8. Josie Stapleton (Tipperary) 9. Ann Molloy (Offaly); 10. Elizabeth O'Brien (Roscommon) 11. Eileen Lawlor (Kerry) 12. Mary J. Curran (Kerry) 13. Lilian Gory (Tipperary) 14. Agnes Gorman (Offaly) 15. Rose Curley (Meath)
1981	1. Martina McGuire (Cavan); 2. Ann Maher (Tipperary) 3. Eileen O'Connor (Kerry) 4. Bridget Sheridan (Cavan) 5. Bernadette Stankard (Galway) 6. Rose Dunican (Offaly) 7. Bernie Dunne (Offaly); 8. Mary Twomey (Kerry) 9. Jean Dunne (Offaly); 10. Bridget Reynolds (Offaly) 11. Elizabeth O'Brien (Roscommon) 12. Mary J. Curran (Kerry) 13. Lilian Gory (Tipperary) 14. Deirdre Quinn (Leitrim) 15. Patricia O'Brien (Cavan) ^{(Note 1)}
1982	1. Hilda O'Leary (Kerry); 2. Ann Molloy (Offaly) 3. Tracy Monahan (Leitrim) 4. Josie Briorty (Cavan) 5. Margaret Lawlor (Kerry) 6. Marion O'Shea (Tipperary) 7. Bernie Dunne (Offaly); 8. Mary Twomey (Kerry) 9. Jean Dunne (Offaly); 10. Claire Dolan (Galway) 11. Angela McCabe (Cavan) 12. Angie Hearne (Wexford) 13. Patricia O'Brien (Cavan) ^{(Note 1)} 14. Del Whyte (Kerry) 15. Bridget Reynolds (Offaly)
1983	1. Kathleen Kennedy (Dublin); 2. Agnes Gorman (Offaly) 3. Nora Foley (Kerry) 4. Tracy Monahan (Leitrim) 5. Claire Geraghty (Galway) 6. Rose Dunican (Offaly) 7. Jacinta Kehoe (Wexford); 8. Annette Walsh (Kerry) 9. Ann Cullen (Wexford); 10. Mary Dempsey (Galway) 11. Mary J. Curran (Kerry) 12. Deidre Quinn (Leitrim) 13. Bridget Reynolds (Offaly) 14. Mary Twomey (Kerry) 15. Eileen Lawlor (Kerry)
1984	1. Kathleen Kennedy (Dublin); 2. Bridget Leen (Kerry) 3. Christine Byrne (Wexford) 4. Connie Conway (Laois) 5. Marion Doherty (Kerry) 6. Jean Dunne (Offaly) 7. Edel Clarke (Westmeath); 8. Catherine Murphy (Wexford) 9. Mary J. Curran (Kerry); 10. Theresa Rafferty (Galway) 11. Eileen Lawlor (Kerry) 12. Meave Quinn (Leitrim) 13. Margaret Lawlor (Kerry) 14. Ann Whelan (Wexford) 15. Geraldine Wrynn (Leitrim)
1985	1. Kathleen Curran (Kerry); 2. Mary Rice (Wexford) 3. Connie Conway (Laois) 4. Joan Shannon (Cork) 5. Marion Doherty (Kerry) 6. Kathleen Murphy (Laois) 7. Edel Cullen (Wexford) 8. Meave Quinn (Leitrim); 9. Lil O'Sullivan (Kerry) 10. Sheila Conroy (Laois); 11. Mary J. Curran (Kerry) 12. Margaret Lawlor (Kerry) 13. Mary Conroy (Laois) 14. Del Whyte (Kerry) 15. Mairead O'Leary (Cork)
1986	1. Kathleen Curran (Kerry); 2. Mary Moore (Wexford) 3. Mary Thorpe (Wexford) 4. Nora Hallissey (Kerry) 5. Christine Harding (Wexford) 6. Anne White (Wexford) 7. Edel Clarke (Westmeath); 8. Mary J. Curran (Kerry) 9. Catherine Murphy (Wexford); 10. Angie Hearne (Wexford) 11. Marie Crotty (Waterford) 12. Marina Barry (Kerry) 13. Jo Glennon (Westmeath) 14. Del Whyte (Kerry) 15. Catherine Conroy (Laois)
1987	1. Kathleen Curran (Kerry); 2. Mary Moore (Wexford) 3. Del Whyte (Kerry) 4. Connie Conway (Laois) 5. Ann Fitzpatrick (Waterford) 6. Jo Glennon (Westmeath) 7. Mary Lane (Kerry); 8. Annette Walsh (Kerry) 9. Rita Dowling (Laois); 10. Marina Barry (Kerry) 11. Mary J. Curran (Kerry) 12. Edel Clarke (Westmeath) 13. Kathleen Moore (Wexford) 14. Marie Crotty (Waterford) 15. Siobhan Dunne (Wexford)
1988	1. Kathleen Curran (Kerry); 2. Mary Moore (Wexford) 3. Connie Conway (Laois) 4. Dolores Tyrell (Waterford) 5. Mary Quinn (Leitrim) 6. June Whyte (Waterford) 7. Phil Curran (Kerry); 8. Mary J. Curran (Kerry) 9. Annette Walsh (Kerry); 10. Bridget Bradley (Wexford) 11. Mary Crotty (Waterford) 12. Eileen Lawlor (Kerry) 13. Sue Ramsbottom (Laois) 14. Bernie Ryan (Waterford) 15. Margeret Lawlor (Kerry)
1989	1. Theresa Furlong (Wexford); 2. Mary Moore (Wexford) 3. Phil Curran (Kerry) 4. Anne Dunford (Waterford) 5. Marion Doherty (Kerry) 6. Kathleen Moore (Wexford) 7. Mary Quinn (Leitrim); 8. Mary J. Curran (Kerry) 9. Annette Walsh (Kerry); 10. Áine Wall (Waterford) 11. Bernie Ryan (Waterford) 12. Marina Barry (Kerry) 13. Sue Ramsbottom (Laois) 14. Angie Hearne (Wexford) 15. Siobhan Dunne (Wexford)
1990	1. Mary Keane (Clare); 2. Bridget Leen (Kerry) 3. Connie Conway (Laois) 4. Mary Mullery (Galway) 5. Marion Doherty (Kerry) 6. Ann Fitzpatrick (Waterford) 7. Mary Downey (Laois); 8. Amanda Donohoe (Laois) 9. Mary J. Curran (Kerry); 10. Áine Wall (Waterford) 11. Katie Liston (Kerry) 12. Marie Ryan (Waterford) 13. Margaret Lawlor (Kerry) 14. Sue Ramsbottom (Laois) 15. Eileen Lawlor (Kerry)
1991	1. Lulu Carroll (Laois); 2. Bridget Leen (Kerry) 3. Martina O'Ryan (Waterford) 4. Anne Dunford (Waterford) 5. Mary Gallagher (Westmeath) 6. Phil Curran (Kerry) 7. Anne Fitzpatrick (Waterford); 8. Marie Crotty (Waterford) 9. Julie Kavanagh (Dublin); 10. Marina Barry (Kerry) 11. Katie Liston (Kerry) 12. Michelle Donnelly (Clare) 13. Amanda Donohoe (Laois) 14. Áine Wall (Waterford) 15. Margaret Brennan (Laois)
1992	1. Bernie Deegan (Laois); 2. Bridget Leen (Kerry) 3. Martina O'Ryan (Waterford) 4. June Whyte (Waterford) 5. Mary Gallagher (Westmeath) 6. Mary Casey (Laois) 7. Marie Gallagher (Clare); 8. Fionnuala Ruane (Kerry) 9. Bernie Ryan (Waterford); 10. Marina Barry (Kerry) 11. Geraldine O'Ryan (Waterford) 12. Edel Clarke (Westmeath) 13. Patricia Mimna (London) ^{(Note 1)} 14. Áine Wall (Waterford) 15. Pauline Mullen (Mayo)
1993	1. Bernie Deegan (Laois); 2. Margaret Buckley (Cork) 3. Bernie O'Neill (Mayo) 4. Katie Liston (Kerry) 5. Mary O'Gorman (Wexford) 6. Mary Casey (Laois) 7. Fionnuala Ruane (Kerry); 8. Denise Smith (Dublin) 9. Marie Fitzgerald (Kerry); 10. Patricia Mimna (London) ^{(Note 1)} 11. Mary J. Curran (Kerry) 12. Sinead Cullinane (Clare) 13. Marina Barry (Kerry) 14. Sue Ramsbottom (Laois) 15. Áine Wall (Waterford)
1994	1. Kathleen Curran (Kerry); 2. Bridget Leen (Kerry) 3. Martina O'Ryan (Waterford) 4. Margaret Phelan (Laois) 5. Diane O'Hora (Mayo) 6. Noirin Walsh (Waterford) 7. Edel Clarke (Westmeath); 8. Jenny Greenan (Monaghan) 9. Meave Quinn (Leitrim); 10. Marie Gallagher (Clare) 11. Sue Ramsbottom (Laois) 12. Catriona Casey (Waterford) 13. Fiona Crotty (Waterford) 14. Áine Wall (Waterford) 15. Patricia Mimna (London) ^{(Note 1)}
1995	1. Anna Lisa Crotty (Waterford); 2. Regina Byrne (Waterford) 3. Bernie O'Neill (Mayo) 4. Cleona Walsh (Waterford) 5. Eileen Gill (Westmeath) 6. Fionnuala Ruane (Kerry) 7. Julianne Torpey (Waterford); 8. Jennifer Greenan (Monaghan) 9. Marie Fitzgerald (Kerry); 10. Fiona O'Driscoll (Cork) 11. Marie Crotty (Waterford) 12. Catriona Casey (Waterford) 13. Geraldine O'Ryan (Waterford) 14. Patricia Mullen (Mayo) 15. Geraldine O'Shea (Kerry)
1996	1. Anna Lisa Crotty (Waterford); 2. Maread Kelly (Monaghan) 3. Noirin Walsh (Waterford) 4. Margaret Phelan (Laois) 5. Brenda McAnespie (Monaghan) 6. Jenny Greenan (Monaghan) 7. Julianne Torpey (Waterford); 8. Christina Heffernan (Mayo) 9. Linda Farrelly (Monaghan); 10. Nicola Dunne (Wicklow) 11. Geraldine O'Shea (Kerry) 12. Anne Marie Curran (Westmeath) 13. Margaret Kerins (Monaghan) 14. Sue Ramsbottom (Laois) 15. Áine Wall (Waterford)
1997	1. Anna Lisa Crotty (Waterford); 2. Maread Kelly (Monaghan) 3. Noirin Walsh (Waterford) 4. Eileen McElvaney (Monaghan) 5. Moira McMahon (Clare) 6. Brenda McAnespie (Monaghan) 7. Julianne Torpey (Waterford); 8. Jenny Greenan (Monaghan) 9. Eithne Morrisey (Clare); 10. Christine O'Brien (Meath) 11. Angela Larkin (Monaghan) 12. Fiona Blessington (Longford) 13. Geraldine O'Ryan (Waterford) 14. Sue Ramsbottom (Laois) 15. Catriona Casey (Waterford)
1998	1. Patricia Bohan (Leitrim); 2. Eileen McElvaney (Monaghan) 3. Siobhan O'Ryan (Waterford) 4. Noirin Walsh (Waterford) 5. Anna Lisa Crotty (Waterford) 6. Anne Marie Dennehy (Meath) 7. Niamh Kindlon (Monaghan); 8. Christin Heffernan (Mayo) 9. Jenny Greenan (Monaghan); 10. Margaret Kerins (Monaghan) 11. Edel Byrne (Monaghan) 12. Christine O'Brien (Meath) 13. Rebecca Hallihan (Waterford) 14. Áine Wall (Waterford) 15. Geraldine O'Ryan (Waterford)
1999	1. Denise Horan (Mayo); 2. Brenda McAnespie (Monaghan) 3. Siobhan O'Ryan (Waterford) 4. Marcella Heffernan (Mayo) 5. Anna Lisa Crotty (Waterford) 6. Mary Casey (Laois) 7. Assumpta Cullen (Wexford) 8. Christina Heffernan (Mayo); 9. Niamh McNelis (Meath) 10. Edel Byrne (Monaghan); 11. Fiona Blessington (Longford) 12. Catriona Casey (Waterford) 13. Christine O'Brien (Meath) 14. Eilish Gormley (Tyrone) 15. Geraldine O'Ryan (Waterford)
2000	1. Denise Horan (Mayo); 2. Marcella Heffernan (Mayo) 3. Helena Lohan (Mayo) 4. Olivia Condon (Waterford) 5. Claire McGarvey (Tyrone) 6. Martina O'Ryan (Waterford) 7. Lynda Donnelly (Tyrone); 8. Anna Lisa Crotty (Waterford) 9. Christina Heffernan (Mayo); 10. Fiona Blessington (Longford) 11. Lynnette Hughes (Tyrone) 12. Mary O'Donnell (Waterford) 13. Diane O'Hora (Mayo) 14. Eilish Gormley (Tyrone) 15. Cora Staunton (Mayo)
2001	1. Denise Horan (Mayo); 2. Noelle Comyns (Clare) 3. Anna Connolly (Laois) 4. Margaret Phelan (Laois) 5. Marcella Heffernan (Mayo) 6. Jenny Greenan (Monaghan) 7. Lorraine Muckian (Louth); 8. Christina Heffernan (Mayo) 9. Kathleen O'Reilly (Laois); 10. Louise Kelly (Dublin) 11. Majella Griffin (Clare) 12. Brianne Leahy (Kildare) 13. Sarah O'Connor (Kerry) 14. Eithne Morrissey (Clare) 15. Cora Staunton (Mayo)
2002	1. Suzanne Hughes (Dublin); 2. Donna Frost (Waterford) 3. Helena Lohan (Mayo) 4. Olivia Butler (Waterford) 5. Claire Egan (Mayo) 6. Jenny Greenan (Monaghan) 7. Julie Torpey (Waterford); 8. Christina Heffernan (Mayo) 9. Mary O'Donnell (Waterford); 10. Sile Nic Coitir (Dublin) 11. Niamh Kindlon (Monaghan) 12. Edel Byrne (Monaghan) 13. Orla Callan (Monaghan) 14. Geraldine O'Shea (Kerry) 15. Cora Staunton (Mayo)
2003	1. Andrea O'Donoghue (Kerry); 2. Nuala O'Se (Mayo) 3. Helena Lohan (Mayo) 4. Maria Kavanagh (Dublin) 5. Anna Lisa Crotty (Waterford) 6. Martina Farrell (Dublin) 7. Emer Flaherty (Galway); 8. Angie McNally (Dublin) 9. Mary O'Donnell (Waterford); 10. Lisa Cohill (Galway) 11. Christina Heffernan (Mayo) 12. Michelle McGing (Mayo) 13. Mary O'Rourke (Waterford) 14. Geraldine O'Shea (Kerry) 15. Kasey O'Driscoll (Kerry)
2004	1. Clíodhna O'Connor (Dublin); 2. Christine O'Reilly (Monaghan) 3. Ruth Stephens (Galway) 4. Helena Lohan (Mayo) 5. Rena Buckley (Cork) 6. Louise Keegan (Dublin) 7. Emer Flaherty (Galway); 8. Annette Clarke (Galway) 9. Claire Egan (Mayo); 10. Lisa Cohill (Galway) 11. Bernie Finlay (Dublin) 12. Valerie Mulcahy (Cork) 13. Mary Nevin (Dublin) 14. Geraldine O'Shea (Kerry) 15. Cora Staunton (Mayo)
2005	1. Una Carroll (Galway); 2. Ruth Stephens (Galway) 3. Angela Walsh (Cork) 4. Leona Tector (Wexford) 5. Briege Corkery (Cork) 6. Aoibheann Daly (Galway) 7. Gemma Fay (Dublin); 8. Juliet Murphy (Cork) 9. Claire Egan (Mayo); 10. Geraldine Doherty (Meath) 11. Deirdre O Reilly (Cork) 12. Lyndsey Davey (Dublin) 13. Valerie Mulcahy (Cork) 14. Niamh Fahey (Galway) 15. Lorna Joyce (Galway)
2006	1. Katrina Connolly (Sligo); 2. Caoimhe Marley (Armagh) 3. Angela Walsh (Cork) 4. Rena Buckley (Cork) 5. Aoibheann Daly (Galway) 6. Bronagh O'Donnell (Armagh) 7. Patricia Fogarty (Laois); 8. Caroline O'Hanlon (Armagh) 9. Mary O'Donnell (Waterford); 10. Nollaig Cleary (Cork) 11. Grainne Nulty (Meath) 12. Sarah O'Connor (Kerry) 13. Tracey Lawlor (Laois) 14. Mary O'Connor (Cork) 15. Dymphna O'Brien (Limerick)
2007	1. Mary Rose Kelly (Wexford); 2. Rebecca Hallahan (Waterford) 3. Angela Walsh (Cork) 4. Rena Buckley (Cork) 5. Claire O'Hara (Mayo) 6. Bríd Stack (Cork) 7. Briege Corkery (Cork); 8. Juliet Murphy (Cork) 9. Brianne Leahy (Kildare); 10. Sarah McLoughlin (Leitrim) 11. Cora Staunton (Mayo) 12. Tracey Lawlor (Laois) 13. Valerie Mulcahy (Cork) 14. Gemma Begley (Tyrone) 15. Deirdre O'Reilly (Cork)
2008	1. Elaine Harte (Cork); 2. Linda Barrett (Cork) 3. Angela Walsh (Cork) 4. Sharon Courtney (Monaghan) 5. Briege Corkery (Cork) 6. Bríd Stack (Cork) 7. Neamh Woods (Tyrone); 8. Juliet Murphy (Cork) 9. Amanda Casey (Monaghan); 10. Nollaig Cleary (Cork); 11. Niamh Kindlon (Monaghan) 12. Michaela Downey (Down) 13. Edel Byrne (Monaghan) 14. Cora Staunton (Mayo) 15. Edel Hanley (Tipperary)
2009	1. Clíodhna O'Connor (Dublin); 2. Noelle Tierney (Mayo) 3. Angela Walsh (Cork) 4. Geraldine O'Flynn (Cork) 5. Briege Corkery (Cork) 6. Martha Carter (Mayo) 7. Siobhain McGrath (Dublin); 8. Juliet Murphy (Cork) 9. Norita Kelly (Cork); 10. Nollaig Cleary (Cork) 11. Edel Byrne (Monaghan) 12. Noelle Earley (Kildare) 13. Clara McAnespie (Monaghan) 14. Sinéad Aherne (Dublin) 15. Cora Staunton (Mayo)
2010	1. Edel Murphy (Kerry); 2. Rachel Ruddy (Dublin) 3. Lorraine Muckian (Laois) 4. Sinead McLaughlin (Tyrone) 5. Siobhan McGrath (Dublin) 6. Bríd Stack (Cork) 7. Gemma Fay (Dublin); 8. Denise Masterson (Dublin) 9. Tracey Lawlor (Laois); 10. Cathy Donnelly (Tyrone) 11. Gemma Begley (Tyrone) 12. Amy McGuinness (Dublin) 13. Yvonne McMonagle (Donegal) 14. Sinéad Aherne (Dublin) 15. Joline Donnelly (Tyrone)
2011	1. Irene Munnelly (Meath); 2. Grainne McNally (Monaghan) 3. Sharon Courtney (Monaghan) 4. Deirdre O'Reilly (Cork) 5. Briege Corkery (Cork) 6. Bríd Stack (Cork) 7. Geraldine O'Flynn (Cork); 8. Juliet Murphy (Cork) 9. Tracey Lawlor (Laois); 10. Therese McNally (Monaghan) 11. Elaine Kelly (Dublin) 12. Mary Kirwan (Laois) 13. Ciara McAnespie (Monaghan) 14. Rena Buckley (Cork) 15. Sinéad Aherne (Dublin)
2012	1. Elaine Harte (Cork); 2. Cait Lynch (Kerry) 3. Bríd Stack (Cork) 4. Christina Reilly (Monaghan) 5. Briege Corkery (Cork) 6. Rena Buckley (Cork) 7. Geraldine O'Flynn (Cork); 8. Sinéad Goldrick (Dublin) 9. Caroline O'Hanlon (Armagh); 10. Sarah Houlihan (Kerry) 11. Cora Staunton (Mayo) 12. Ciara O'Sullivan (Cork) 13. Cathriona McConnell (Monaghan) 14. Valerie Mulcahy (Cork) 15. Louise Ni Muircheartaigh (Kerry)
2013	1. Yvonne Byrne (Mayo); 2. Grainne McNally (Monaghan) 3. Sharon Courtney (Monaghan) 4. Deirdre O'Reilly (Cork) 5. Briege Corkery (Cork) 6. Sinéad Goldrick (Dublin) 7. Geraldine O'Flynn (Cork); 8. Annette Clarke (Galway) 9. Juliet Murphy (Cork); 10. Sarah Houlihan (Kerry) 11. Caoimhe Mohan (Monaghan) 12. Cora Courtney (Monaghan) 13. Valerie Mulcahy (Cork) 14. Cora Staunton (Mayo) 15. Louise Ni Muircheartaigh (Kerry)
2014	1. Ciamh Dollard (Laois); 2. Mairead Tennyson (Armagh) 3. Angela Walsh (Cork) 4. Bríd Stack (Cork) 5. Vera Foley (Cork) 6. Sinéad Goldrick (Dublin) 7. Geraldine O'Flynn (Cork); 8. Briege Corkery (Cork) 9. Caroline O'Hanlon (Armagh); 10. Noëlle Healy (Dublin) 11. Ciara O'Sullivan (Cork) 12. Cora Courtney (Monaghan) 13. Lyndsey Davey (Dublin) 14. Sinéad Aherne (Dublin) 15. Aileen Pyres (Down)
2015	1. Linda Martin (Monaghan); 2. Marie Ambrose (Cork) 3. Aislinn Desmond (Kerry) 4. Geraldine O'Flynn (Cork) 5. Vera Foley (Cork) 6. Sinead Finnegan (Dublin) 7. Sinéad Goldrick (Dublin); 8. Briege Corkery (Cork) 9. Rena Buckley (Cork) 10. Cora Courtney (Monaghan) 11. Cora Staunton (Mayo) 12. Carla Rowe (Dublin) 13. Valerie Mulcahy (Cork) 14. Lyndsey Davey (Dublin) 15. Aimee Mackin (Armagh)
2016	1. Mary Hulgraine (Kildare); 2. Marie Ambrose (Cork) 3. Bríd Stack (Cork) 4. Leah Caffrey (Dublin) 5. Sinéad Goldrick (Dublin) 6. Deirdre O'Reilly (Cork) 7. Grainne McNally (Monaghan) 8. Fiona McHale (Mayo) 9. Briege Corkery (Cork); 10. Noëlle Healy (Dublin) 11. Ciara O'Sullivan (Cork) 12. Carla Rowe (Dublin) 13. Ciara McAnespie (Monaghan) 14. Sinéad Aherne (Dublin) 15. Orla Finn (Cork)
2017	1. Ciara Trant (Dublin); 2. Emma Spillane (Cork) 3. Sarah Tierney (Mayo) 4. Rachel Ruddy (Dublin) 5. Caroline Kelly (Kerry) 6. Ciara Hegarty (Donegal) 7. Leah Caffrey (Dublin) 8. Lorraine Scanlon (Kerry) 9. Aileen Gilroy (Mayo); 10. Aimee Mackin Armagh 11. Niamh Hegarty (Donegal) 12. Nicole Owens (Dublin) 13. Sinéad Aherne (Dublin) 14. Cora Staunton (Mayo) 15. Noëlle Healy (Dublin)
2018	1. Ciara Trant (Dublin); 2. Treasa Doherty (Donegal) 3. Róisín Phelan (Cork) 4. Sinéad Burke (Galway) 5. Sinéad Goldrick (Dublin) 6. Siobhán McGrath (Dublin), 7. Emma Spillane (Cork); 8. Neamh Woods (Tyrone) 9. Lauren Magee (Dublin); 10. Ciara O'Sullivan (Cork) 11. Noëlle Healy (Dublin) 12. Lyndsey Davey (Dublin) 13. Doireann O'Sullivan (Cork) 14. Sinéad Aherne (Dublin) 15. Sarah Houlihan (Kerry)
2019	1. Monica McGuirk (Meath); 2. Sinéad Burke (Galway) 3. Niamh Collins (Dublin) 4. Melissa Duggan (Cork) 5. Nicola Ward (Galway) 6. Sinéad Goldrick (Dublin) 7. Olwen Carey (Dublin) 8. Louise Ward (Galway), 9. Siobhán McGrath (Dublin); 10. Carla Rowe (Dublin) 11. Niamh McEvoy (Dublin); 12. Lyndsey Davey (Dublin) 13. Tracey Leonard (Galway) 14. Rachel Kearns (Mayo) 15. Orla Finn (Cork)

Notes

- ^1 Patricia O'Brien (1981 and 1982) of Cavan and Patricia Mimna (1992, 1993 and 1994) of London are the same player. O'Brien is her maiden name while Mimna is her married name.

== 2020s ==
=== 2021 TG4 Ladies Football All Star Team ===
- Monica McGuirk Meath – 2nd award
- Emma Troy Meath – 1st award
- Mary Kate Lynch Meath – 1st award
- Leah Caffrey Dublin – 3rd award
- Erika O'Shea Cork – 1st award
- Aoibhín Cleary Meath – 1st award
- Orlagh Nolan Dublin – 1st award
- Hannah Looney Cork – 1st award
- Máire O'Shaughnessy Meath – 1st award
- Hannah Tyrrell Dublin – 1st award
- Rachel Kearns Mayo – 2nd award
- Niamh O'Sullivan Meath – 1st award
- Vikki Wall Meath – 1st award
- Emma Duggan Meath – 1st award
- Geraldine McLaughlin Donegal – 1st award

=== 2022 TG4 Ladies Football All Star Team ===
- Monica McGuirk Meath - 3rd award
- Shauna Ennis Meath - 1st award
- Kayleigh Cronin Kerry - 1st award
- Danielle Caldwell Mayo - 1st award
- Aishling O Connell Kerry - 1st award
- Emma Troy Meath - 2nd award
- Aoibhín Cleary Meath - 2nd award
- Cait Lynch Kerry - 2nd award
- Niamh McLaughlin Donegal - 1st award
- Niamh Carmody Kerry - 1st award
- Emma Duggan Meath - 2nd award
- Shauna Howley Mayo - 1st award
- Aimee Macken Armagh 3rd award
- Stacey Grimes Meath - 1st award
- Louise Ni Mhuircheartaigh Kerry - 3rd award

== Most Individual All Stars ==
All Stars	Player	County	Years
11	Mary J. Curran	Kerry	1980, 1981, 1983, 1984, 1985, 1986, 1987, 1988, 1989, 1990, 1993
11	Cora Staunton	Mayo	2000, 2001, 2002, 2004, 2007, 2008, 2009, 2012, 2013, 2015, 2017

== All Star games ==
Between 1980 and 2002 the All Stars played an annual exhibition game against the winners of the All-Ireland Senior Ladies' Football Championship. Since 2004 the Ladies' Gaelic Football Association have organised bi-annual overseas tours featuring two All Star selections. When players are eligible to play for both teams in an exhibition game Replacement All Stars are called up.

Year		Score	Opponents	Venue
1980	All Stars		Tipperary	
1981	All Stars	6–6;0–7	Offaly	
1982	All Stars	4–7;3–6	Kerry	
1983	All Stars	0–3;5–9	Kerry	
1984	All Stars	0–6;1–5	Kerry	
1985	All Stars	0–7;0–1	Kerry	
1986	All Stars	3–7;3–5	Kerry	
1987	All Stars	1–5;5–10	Kerry	
1988	All Stars	0–7;3–7	Kerry	
1989	All Stars	2–6;0–7	Kerry	
1990	All Stars	1–6;2–10	Kerry	
1991	All Stars	4–17;1–9	Waterford	
1992	All Stars	3–4;3–7	Waterford	
1993	All Stars	1–11;1–17	Kerry	
1994	All Stars		Waterford	
1995	All Stars	2–12;4–6	Waterford	
1996	All Stars		Monaghan	
1997	All Stars	2–18;1–12	Monaghan	
1998	All Stars	3–10;6–14	Waterford	
1999	All Stars	1–15;0–8	Mayo	Gibbons Park, Claremorris
2000	All Stars	5–7;1–2	Mayo	Gibbons Park, Claremorris
2001	All Stars	3–18;5–8	Laois	
2002	All Stars	^{(Note 1)}	Mayo	Gibbons Park, Claremorris
2004	2003 All Stars	^{(Note 2)}	Rest of Ireland XV	Gaelic Park, New York
2006	2004 All Stars	4–15;1–9	2005 All Stars	Singapore Polo Club
2008	2006 All Stars	3–15;2–13	2007 All Stars	Dubai Polo and Equestrian Club
2010	2008 All Stars	3–11;1–11	2009 All Stars	Pairc na nGael, San Francisco
2012	2010 All Stars	4–10;3–11	2011 All Stars	Centennial Park, Toronto
2014	2012 All Stars	9–19;5–14	2013 All Stars	Hong Kong Football Club Stadium
2016	2014 All Stars	3–18;3–18 ^{(Note 3)}	2015 All Stars	Torero Stadium
2018	2016 All-Stars	7–19;7–18	2017 All-Stars	Chulalongkorn University Stadium

Notes

- ^1 Match won by Mayo.
- ^2 Played before the men's 2004 Connacht Senior Football Championship match between New York and Mayo.
- ^3 2015 All Stars win 3–2 on penalties.

== Player's Player of the Year ==
=== TG4 Senior Player's Player of the Year ===
Season	Winners	County
2011	Juliet Murphy	Cork
2012	Briege Corkery	Cork
2013	Geraldine O'Flynn	Cork
2014	Caroline O'Hanlon	Armagh
2015	Briege Corkery	Cork
2016	Bríd Stack	Cork
2017	Noëlle Healy	Dublin
2018	Sinéad Aherne	Dublin
2019	Siobhán McGrath	Dublin
2020	Aimee Mackin	Armagh

=== TG4 Intermediate Player's Player of the Year ===
Season	Winners	County
2011	Aine Tighe	Leitrim
2012	Caroline O'Hanlon	Armagh
2013	Grainne Smith	Cavan
2014	Caroline Little	Fermanagh
2015	Aileen Wall	Waterford
2016	Aisling Holton	Kildare
2017	Aisling McCarthy	Tipperary
2018	Neamh Woods	Tyrone
2019	Aishling Moloney	Tipperary
2021	Sarah Dillon	Westmeath
2022	Mo Nerney	Laois

=== TG4 Junior Player's Player of the Year ===
Season	Winners	County
2011	Lucy Mulhall	Wicklow
2012	Claire Timoney	Antrim
2013	Mairead Daly	Offaly
2014	Aileen Pyres	Down
2015	Kate Flood	Louth
2016	Mairéad Reynolds	Longford
2017	Emma Doherty	Derry
2018	Kate Flood	Louth
2019	Eimear Smyth	Fermanagh
2021	Clíodhna Ní Shé	Carlow
2022	Bláithín Bogue	Fermanagh
