= Valerie Mulcahy =

Cork senior ladies' footballer

Personal information
- Born: Cork, Ireland
- Occupation: Teacher

Sport
- Sport: Ladies' Gaelic football
- Position: Corner forward
Club
- Years: Club
- Rockbán
Inter-county
- Years: County
- 2004–2015: Cork
Inter-county titles
- All-Irelands: 10
- All Stars: 6

Valerie Mulcahy (born 1983) is an Irish footballer. As a ladies' Gaelic footballer, she played at senior level for Cork, winning ten All-Ireland titles and nine Ladies' National Football League titles between 2005 and 2015. She was also an All Star on six occasions. As a women's association football player, she represented Ireland at the 2003 Summer Universiade and played for Cork City in the Women's National League. In 2015, Mulcahy helped launch the Women's Gaelic Players' Association. In the same year, she also came out as gay.

== Gaelic football ==
Between 2004 and 2015 Mulcahy played at senior level for the Cork county ladies' football team, representing her county in competitions such as the All-Ireland Senior Ladies' Football Championship, the Munster Senior Ladies' Football Championship and the Ladies' National Football League. Together with Rena Buckley, Nollaig Cleary, Briege Corkery, Juliet Murphy, Mary O'Connor and Angela Walsh, she was a prominent member of the Cork team, winning ten All-Ireland medals, ten Munster titles and nine League titles. Between 2005 and 2015, Mulcahy played in ten All-Ireland finals, scoring 7–38. She scored in every final she played in except in 2006. She scored two goals in 2007 and scored a hat-trick of goals in 2008. She was the top scorer in the All-Ireland final in 2005, 2007, 2008, 2009, 2012, 2013 and 2015. In January 2015 Mulcahy helped launch the Women's Gaelic Players Association and subsequently served on the association's executive team.

== Association football ==
Valerie Mulcahy
College career
Years	Team	Apps	(Gls)
- University of Limerick

Senior career*
Years	Team	Apps	(Gls)
2011–12	Cork Women's F.C.		
2016–	Cork City		

International career
2003	Ireland Universities		
- * Club domestic league appearances and goals

While attending the University of Limerick, Mulcahy was chosen to represent Ireland at the 2003 Summer Universiade. During the inaugural 2011–12 Women's National League season, Mulcahy also played for Cork Women's F.C. and scored the winning goal in their first league victory. Mulcahy came on as a substitute to score an 86th-minute goal in a 1–0 win against Shamrock Rovers at Tallaght Stadium. After retiring as an inter-county Ladies' Gaelic footballer in 2015, Mulcahy subsequently joined Cork City for the 2016 season.

== Personal life ==
In January 2015, Mulcahy came out as lesbian. She announced the decision to coincide with her taking part in the Donal Óg Cusack/RTÉ documentary, Coming Out of the Curve. She subsequently campaigned in favour of same-sex marriage in the Republic of Ireland during the 2015 referendum. In June 2015 Mulcahy married Meg Blyth, her partner of six years. Blyth is a choreographer.

== Teacher ==
Mulcahy studied PE and Irish at the University of Limerick and is a PE and Maths teacher at Gaelcholáiste Mhuire in Cork.

== Honours ==
Cork

- All-Ireland Senior Ladies' Football Championship
  - 2005, 2006, 2007, 2008, 2009, 2011, 2012, 2013, 2014, 2015: 10
- Ladies' National Football League
  - 2005, 2006, 2008, 2009, 2010, 2011, 2013, 2014, 2015: 9
- Munster Senior Ladies' Football Championship
  - ???: 10
- RTÉ Sports Team of the Year Award
  - 2014

Individual

- Ladies' Gaelic football All Stars Awards
  - 2004, 2005, 2007, 2012, 2013, 2015: 6
