= 2011 All-Ireland Senior Ladies' Football Championship =

All-Ireland Senior Ladies' Football Championship 2011
Championship details
- Dates: 23 July – 25 September 2011
- Teams: 33

All-Ireland champions
- Winners: Cork (6th win)
- Captain: Amy O'Shea
- Manager: Éamon Ryan

All Ireland Runners-up
- Runners-up: Monaghan
- Captain: Sharon Courtney
- Manager: Gregory McGonigle

Provincial champions

Championship Statistics
- Matches Played: 23

The 2011 All-Ireland Senior Ladies' Football Championship was the 38th edition of the Ladies' Gaelic Football Association's premier inter-county Ladies' Gaelic football tournament. It was known for sponsorship reasons as the TG4 All-Ireland Senior Ladies' Football Championship.

Cork were the winners, defeating Monaghan in the final.

== Structure ==
- Sixteen teams compete.
  - The top four teams from 2010 receive byes to the quarter-finals.
  - The quarter-finalists from 2010 receive byes to the second round.
  - The other eight teams play in the first round.
- All games are knockout matches, drawn games being replayed.
- The first-round losers playoff, with one team being relegated to the intermediate championship for 2012. Teams must spend two years as a senior team before they are eligible for relegation; teams that have not done so are exempt from relegation.

== Fixtures and results ==
=== Early stages ===
23 July 2011
3:30 pm IST
1st Round

| Armagh | 2–8 – 3–12 | Sligo |

Pearse Park, Longford

23 July 2011
5:15 pm IST
1st Round

| Dublin | 4–15 – 0–5 | Kildare |

Pearse Park, Longford

24 July 2011
3:00 pm IST
1st Round

| Down | 1–5 – 5–13 | Donegal |

St Tiernach's Park, Clones
Referee: Sean McIntyre

1 August 2011
4:15 pm IST
1st Round

| Tipperary | 3–13 – 1–6 | Clare |
|---|---|---|
| | Report |

St Brendan's Park, Birr
Referee: Keith Tighe

6 August 2011
2:00 pm IST
2nd Round

| Meath | 3–27 – 0–5 | Sligo |

Leo Casey Park, Ballymahon

6 August 2011
2:00 pm IST
2nd Round

| Tipperary | 1–11 – 2–20 | Tyrone |

The Downs

6 August 2011
4:00 pm IST
2nd Round

| Dublin | 3–9 – 2–6 | Galway |

St Brendan's Park, Birr

6 August 2011
6:00 pm IST
2nd Round

| Donegal | 0–5 – 2–10 | Kerry |

St Brendan's Park, Birr

=== Final stages ===
13 August 2011
4:15 pm IST
Quarter-final

| Mayo | 0-10 – 3-11 | Kerry |

St Brendan's Park, Birr
Referee: Pat Kehoe

13 August 2011
6:00 pm IST
Quarter-final

| Laois | 1-17 – 2-12 A.E.T. | Tyrone |

St Brendan's Park, Birr
Referee: Seán Joy

20 August 2011
2:15 pm IST
Quarter-final

| Meath | 0-8 – 2-13 | Monaghan |

St Brendan's Park, Birr

20 August 2011
4:00 pm IST
Quarter-final

| Cork | 2-14 – 3-10 | Dublin |

St Brendan's Park, Birr
Referee: John Niland

27 August 2011
6:00 pm IST
Semi-final

| Cork | 4-10 – 1-6 | Laois |
|---|---|---|
| A O’Shea 3-0, R Ni Bhuachalla 1-1, Juliet Murphy 0-4 (3f), Nollaig Cleary 0-3, M Kelly & G Kearney 0-1 each | Report | M Dunne 1-1, T Lawlor 0-3 (2f), Mary Kirwan (f) & G Weston 0-1 each |

Leahy Park, Cashel
Referee: Gavin Corrigan

3 September 2011
5:00 pm IST
Semi-final

| Kerry | 2-12 – 4-15 | Monaghan |
|---|---|---|
| | Report |

St Brendan's Park, Birr
Referee: Keith Tighe

25 September 2011

| Cork | 2–7; 0–11 | Monaghan |
|---|---|---|
| Nollaig Cleary (1-0); Rhona Ní Bhuachalla (1-0); Juliet Murphy (0-3); Geraldine O'Flynn (0-1); Rena Buckley (0-1); Grace Kearney (0-1); Valerie Mulcahy (0-1) | | Catriona McConnell (0-3); Niamh Kindlon (0-3); Ellen McCarron (0-2); Ciara McAnespie (0-1); Caoimhe Mohan (0-1); Laura McEnaney (0-1) |

Croke Park, Dublin
Attendance: 20,061
Referee: John Niland (Sligo)
