= 2017 All-Ireland Senior Camogie Championship =

Camogie championship

All-Ireland Senior Camogie Championship 2017
Championship details
- Dates: 10 June – 10 September 2017
- Teams: 10

All-Ireland champions
- Winners: Cork (27th win)
- Captain: Rena Buckley
- Manager: Paudie Murray

All-Ireland runners-up
- Runners-up: Kilkenny
- Captain: Anna Farrell
- Manager: Ann Downey

Championship statistics
- Matches played: 25

The 2017 All-Ireland Senior Camogie Championship – known as the Liberty Insurance All-Ireland Camogie Championship for sponsorship reasons – was 2017's premier inter-county camogie competition.

The winners receive the O'Duffy Cup.

The championship began on 10 June 2017 and ended on 10 September with a Cork victory.

== Teams ==
The All-Ireland camogie championships are structured in three tiers -

- Ten county teams compete in the Senior Championship (tier 1)
- Twelve county teams compete in the Intermediate Championship (tier 2)
- Nine county teams compete in the Junior Championship (tier 3).

Nine of the senior camogie teams enter second teams in either the intermediate or junior championships. If the intermediate championship is won by a county's first team, that team is promoted to next year's senior championship. The winner of the junior championship is promoted to next year's intermediate championship provided that this does not result in two teams from the same county being in the same championship tier.

Senior Championship Teams –
Clare
Cork
Dublin
Galway
Kilkenny
Limerick
Offaly
Tipperary
Waterford
Wexford

Intermediate Championship Teams –
Antrim
Carlow
Cork (second team)
Derry
Down
Galway (second team)
Kildare
Kilkenny (second team)
Laois
Meath
Tipperary (second team)
Wexford (second team)

Junior Championship Teams –
Armagh
Clare (second team)
Dublin (second team)
Kerry
Offaly (second team)
Roscommon
Waterford (second team)
Westmeath
Wicklow

== Format ==
The senior championship begins with a group stage and progresses to a knock-out stage.

Group Stage

The ten teams are drawn into two groups of five. All the teams play each other once. Three points are awarded for a win and one for a draw.

Knock-out stage

- The two group runners-up play the two third-placed teams in the two quarter-finals.
- The two group winners play the two quarter-final winners in the two semi-finals.
- The semi-final winners contest the 2017 All-Ireland Senior Camogie Championship Final

== Group stage ==
Key to colours
Advance to semi-finals
Advance to quarter-finals

=== Group 1 ===
Team	Pld	W	D	L	F	A	Diff	Pts
Kilkenny	4	3	1	0	76	42	+34	10
Galway	4	3	0	1	98	55	+43	9
Dublin	4	2	0	2	58	79	–21	6
Clare	4	1	1	2	70	72	–2	4
Waterford	4	0	0	4	50	104	–54	0

=== Group 2 ===
Team	Pld	W	D	L	F	A	Diff	Pts
Cork	4	4	0	0	92	41	51	12
Wexford	4	3	0	1	65	66	–1	9
Tipperary	4	1	0	3	66	79	–13	3
Offaly	4	1	0	3	69	83	–14	3
Limerick	4	1	0	3	68	91	–23	3

== Knock-out stage ==
=== Quarter-finals ===
5 August 2017; 5:00 pm Quarter-Final	Dublin	1-16 – 0-12	Wexford	Semple Stadium, Thurles; Man of the Match: Faye McCarthy (St. Jude's)
5 August 2017; 5:00 pm Quarter-Final	A Maher 0-7 (5fs); A Twomey 1-2; E McCarthy, F McCarthy (fs) 0-2 each; Siobhán Kehoe, E McGovern, H Hegarty 0-1 each	Report	C Foxe 0-4(2fs, 1 45); Shelly Kehoe 0-3; Stacey Kehoe 0-2; L Bolger, S O’Connor (f), Ú Leacy (f) 0-1 each	Semple Stadium, Thurles; Man of the Match: Faye McCarthy (St. Jude's)

5 August 2017; 7:00 pm Quarter-Final	Galway	1-22 – 0-10	Tipperary	Semple Stadium, Thurles; Man of the Match: Tara Kenny (Sarsfields)
5 August 2017; 7:00 pm Quarter-Final	A O’Reilly 1-7(0-6fs, 0-1 45); N Kilkenny 0-4; N McGrath 0-3; M Cooney, S McGrath 0-2 each; O’McGrath, A M Starr, A Donohue, C Finnerty 0-1 each	Report	C Devane 0-3(2fs), Ciardha Maher 0-2, O O’Dwyer 0-2, M Teehan 0-1, Megan Ryan 0-1, R Howard 0-1	Semple Stadium, Thurles; Man of the Match: Tara Kenny (Sarsfields)

=== Semi-finals ===
19 August 2017; Semi-Final; 5:15 pm	Kilkenny	2-11 – 0-9	Dublin	Semple Stadium, Thurles; Man of the Match: Anne Dalton (St. Lachtain's)
19 August 2017; Semi-Final; 5:15 pm	D Gaule 1-2(0-1f), D Morrissey 0-3(1f); J Reddy 1-0; A Farrell, M Quilty, M Farrell, J Malone, M Walsh, K Power 0-1 each	Report	A Maher 0-6(4fs); S Kehoe 0-2, F McCarthy 0-1(f)	Semple Stadium, Thurles; Man of the Match: Anne Dalton (St. Lachtain's)

19 August 2017; Semi-Final; 7:00 pm	Cork	2-9 – 1-9	Galway	Semple Stadium, Thurles; Man of the Match: Orla Cotter (St Catherine's)
19 August 2017; Semi-Final; 7:00 pm	Orla Cotter 1-3 (0-3f), Aoife Murray 1-0 pen, Katrina Mackey 0-2, Amy O'Connor, Orla Cronin, Hannah Looney, Niamh McCarthy	Report	Aoife Donohue 0-4 (0-3f), Niamh Hanniffy 1-0, Orla McGrath and Ailish O'Reilly (0-1f) 0-2 each, Niamh McGrath 0-1	Semple Stadium, Thurles; Man of the Match: Orla Cotter (St Catherine's)

=== Final ===
10 September 2017; Final; 4:00 pm	Cork	0-10 - 0-9	Kilkenny	Croke Park, Dublin; Attendance: 20,438; Referee: Owen Elliott (All Saints Ballymena, Antrim); Man of the Match: Orla Cronin (Enniskeane)
10 September 2017; Final; 4:00 pm	O Cronin 0-3, A.O'Connor 0-2, O.Cotter 0-2, K.Mackey 0-1, G.O'Connor 0-1, J.White 0-1	Report	M.Farrell 0-2, D.Gaule 0-2, J A Malone 0-2, K.Power 0-1, S.Farrell 0-1, M.Walsh 0-1	Croke Park, Dublin; Attendance: 20,438; Referee: Owen Elliott (All Saints Ballymena, Antrim); Man of the Match: Orla Cronin (Enniskeane)

Preceded by All-Ireland Senior Camogie Championship 2016	All-Ireland Senior Camogie Championship; 1932 – present	Succeeded by All-Ireland Senior Camogie Championship 2018
