= Sue Ramsbottom =

Irish Gaelic and rugby union footballer

Personal information
- Native name: Sosaidh Ramsbottom (Irish)
- Born: 11 July 1973 (age 53) Ireland
- Occupation: soldier

Sport
- Sport: Ladies' Football
- Position: full forward, left corner forward, centre forward
Clubs
- Years: Club
- The Heath; Timahoe
Inter-county
- Years: County
- 1988–2003: Laois
Inter-county titles
- All-Irelands: 1
- All Stars: 7

Sue Ramsbottom (born 11 July 1973) is an Irish ladies' Gaelic football and rugby union player.

== Early life ==
Ramsbottom attended Timahoe National School and played Gaelic football on the boys' team. She attended the Brigidine secondary school in Mountrath.

== Sporting career ==
=== Ladies' football ===
Sue Ramsbottom began playing ladies' football with The Heath, scoring in an all-Ireland club final at the age of 12. She was later part of the founding of a ladies' team in Timahoe. She won several Laois Ladies' Senior Football Club Championship with both clubs. Her early heroes were Colm O'Rourke and Barney Rock.

Ramsbottom lost six All-Ireland Senior Ladies' Football Championship finals with Laois before finally winning in 2001. She also won seven Ladies' Gaelic Football All Stars Awards, in 1988, 1989, 1990, 1993, 1994, 1996 and 1997.

In a 2020 ranking by the Irish Independent, Ramsbottom was named as the fourth-greatest player of all time. Jenny Grennan named her among her best opponents, saying she was "powerful and seriously strong on the ball. Protected the ball really well and very difficult to dispossess."

In 2022 she was featured in a Laochra Gael episode, the first Laois player in any sport to be so honoured.

=== Rugby ===
Ramsbottom also played rugby union, appearing for Galwegians and winning three caps for Ireland. She was in the Irish squad for the 1998 Women's Rugby World Cup.

== Personal life ==
Ramsbottom is an officer in the Irish Army, currently holding the rank of commandant. She has served as aide-de-camp to President of Ireland Mary McAleese and has taught at the Defence Forces Training Centre. She has two daughters.
