= 2012 All-Ireland Senior Ladies' Football Championship =

Ladies Gaelic football tournament

All-Ireland Senior Ladies' Football Championship 2012
Championship details
- Dates: 23 July – 7 October 2012
- Teams: 13

All-Ireland champions
- Winners: Cork (7th win)
- Captain: Rena Buckley
- Manager: Eamonn Ryan

All Ireland Runners-up
- Runners-up: Kerry
- Captain: Bernie Breen
- Manager: William O'Sullivan

Provincial champions

Championship Statistics
- Matches Played: 12
- Player of the Year: Briege Corkery (Cork)

The 2012 All-Ireland Senior Ladies' Football Championship is the 39th edition of the Ladies' Gaelic Football Association's premier inter-county Ladies' Gaelic football tournament. It is known for sponsorship reasons as the TG4 All-Ireland Senior Ladies' Football Championship.

== Structure ==
- Thirteen teams compete.
  - The top four teams from 2011 receive byes to the quarter-finals.
  - The quarter-finalists from 2011 receive byes to the second round.
  - The other two teams play in the first round.
- All games are knockout matches, drawn games being replayed.

== Fixtures and results ==
=== Qualifiers ===
2012
First round

| Kildare | 0-11 – 0-9 | Laois |

2012
Second round

| Kerry | 1-25 – 0-10 | Westmeath |

2012
Second round

| Donegal | 3-13 – 0-13 | Kildare |

2012
Second round

| Clare | 1-11 – 0-10 | Meath |

2012
Second round

| Mayo | 3-12 – 0-4 | Tyrone |

=== Final stages ===
18 August 2012
4:15 pm IST
Quarter-final

| Clare | 2-16 – 5-19 | Galway |

St Brendan's Park, Birr
Referee: Maggie Farrelly

18 August 2012
6:00 pm IST
Quarter-final

| Dublin | 0-10 – 0-11 | Kerry |

St Brendan's Park, Birr
Referee: John Niland

25 August 2012
12:30 pm IST
Quarter-final

| Cork | 8-27 – 0-2 | Donegal |

Dr Hyde Park, Roscommon
Referee: Gavin Corrigan

25 August 2012
2:15 pm IST
Quarter-final

| Mayo | 2-14 – 4-15 | Monaghan |

Dr Hyde Park, Roscommon
Referee: Michael John O'Keeffe

25 August 2012
4:00 pm IST
Semi-final

| Cork | 2-15 – 0-12 | Monaghan |

St Brendan's Park, Birr
Referee: John Niland

1 September 2012
4:00 pm IST
Semi-final

| Kerry | 1-13 – 1-7 | Galway |
|---|---|---|
| S Houlihan (2f), L Ní Mhuircheartaigh (2f) 0-5 each; L Scanlon 1-1; C Kelly, D Corridan 0-1 each | Report | E Concannon 1-2 (0-2f); L Joyce, S Burke, B Walsh, T Leonard, G O’Connor 0-1 each |

St Brendan's Park, Birr

7 October 2012

| Cork | 0–16; 0–7 | Kerry |
|---|---|---|
| Valerie Mulcahy (0-7); Doireann O'Sullivan (0-4); Geraldine O'Flynn (0-2); Briege Corkery (0-1); Orlagh Farmer (0-1); Nollaig Cleary (0-1) | | Sarah Houlihan (0-3); Lorraine Scanlon (0-2); Louise Ní Mhuircheartaigh (0-1); Patrice Dennehy (0-1) |

Croke Park, Dublin
Attendance: 16,998
Referee: Gavin Corrigan (Down)
