= 2009 All-Ireland Senior Ladies' Football Championship =

All-Ireland Senior Ladies' Football Championship 2009
Championship details
- Dates: 26 July – 27 September 2009
- Teams: 16

All-Ireland champions
- Winners: Cork (5th win)

All Ireland Runners-up
- Runners-up: Dublin

Provincial champions

Championship Statistics
- Matches Played: 16

The 2009 All-Ireland Senior Ladies' Football Championship was held between July 26 and September 27, 2009. Cork were the winners for the fifth season in a row.

== Structure ==
- Sixteen teams compete.
  - The top four teams from 2008 receive byes to the quarter-finals.
  - The quarter-finalists from 2008 receive byes to the second round.
  - The other eight teams play in the first round.
- All games are knockout matches, drawn games being replayed.
- The first-round losers playoff, with one team being relegated to the intermediate championship for 2010. Teams must spend two years as a senior team before they are eligible for relegation; teams that have not done so are exempt from relegation.

== Fixtures and results ==
=== Early stages ===
July 26
1st Round

Armagh	0–9 – 1–13	Meath

Breffni Park, Cavan

July 26
1st Round

Down	1–9 – 0–11	Donegal

Breffni Park, Cavan

July 26
1st Round

Sligo	2–11 – 0–8	Leitrim

Ballyshannon

August 2
1st Round

Laois	0–15 – 0–3	Tipperary

O'Connor Park, Tullamore

August 8
2nd Round

Kerry	2–19 – 0–10	Meath

Nenagh

August 8
2nd Round

Laois	1–15 – 2–19	Mayo

Pearse Park, Longford

August 8
2nd Round

Down	0–9 – 0–22	Monaghan

Pearse Park, Longford

August 9
2nd Round

Kildare	5–12 – 3–6	Sligo

St. Brigids, Kiltoom

=== Relegation match ===
Tipperary and Leitrim were exempt from relegation.

August 16
Relegation match

Donegal	0–6 – 1–11	Armagh

Bawnboy

Donegal are relegated to the Intermediate Ladies' Football Championship for 2010.

=== Final stages ===
August 15
Quarter-final

Monaghan	0–17 – 1–13	Galway

Ballymahon
Referee: John Murray (Dublin)

August 15
Quarter-final

Mayo	3–9 – 1–12	Tyrone

Ballymahon
Referee: Keith Tighe (Dublin)

August 22
Quarter-final

Cork	4–23 – 0–6	Kildare

Nowlan Park, Kilkenny
Referee: Eugene O'Hare (Down)

August 22
Quarter-final

Dublin	1–13 – 2–6	Kerry

Nowlan Park, Kilkenny
Referee: Declan Corcoran (Mayo)

August 29
Semi-final

Cork	3–10 – 1–9	Mayo

Nenagh
Referee: Keith Delahunty (Tipperary)

September 5
Semi-final

Dublin	2–14 – 1–15	Monaghan

Ardee
Referee: Declan Corcoran (Mayo)

27 September 2009

Cork	1–9; 0–11	Dublin
Valerie Mulcahy (0-5); Nollaig Cleary (1-1); Juliet Murphy (0-2); Mairéad Kelly (0-1)		Sinéad Aherne (0-3); Mary Nevin (0-2); Amy McGuinness (0-2); Siobhán McGrath (0-1); Elaine Kelly (0-1); Lyndsey Davey (0-1); Lindsay Peat (0-1)

Croke Park, Dublin
Attendance: 21,606
Referee: Declan Corcoran (Mayo)
