= 2013 All-Ireland Senior Ladies' Football Championship =

Gaelic football event

All-Ireland Senior Ladies' Football Championship 2013
Championship details
- Dates: 27 July – 29 September 2013
- Teams: 14

All-Ireland champions
- Winners: Cork (8th win)
- Captain: Ann Marie Walsh
- Manager: Éamonn Ryan

All Ireland Runners-up
- Runners-up: Monaghan
- Captain: Therese McNally
- Manager: Gregory McGonigle

Provincial champions

Championship Statistics

The 2013 All-Ireland Senior Ladies' Football Championship was the 40th edition of the Ladies' Gaelic Football Association's premier inter-county Ladies' Gaelic football tournament. It was known for sponsorship reasons as the TG4 All-Ireland Senior Ladies' Football Championship. It was won by Cork, who defeated Monaghan in the final.

== Results ==
=== Preliminary rounds ===
27 July 2013
1:30 p.m.
First round

Clare	3-17 – 1-22	Kildare

Páirc Seán Mac Diarmada, Carrick-on-Shannon
Referee: Gavin Corrigan

27 July 2013
3:15 p.m.
First round

Donegal	1-7 – 1-15	Westmeath

Páirc Seán Mac Diarmada, Carrick-on-Shannon
Referee: PJ Rabbitte

10 August 2013
2 p.m.
Second round

Westmeath	0-11 – 5-11	Mayo

Pearse Park, Longford
Referee: Maggie Farrelly

10 August 2013
3:45 p.m.
Second round

Clare	1-9 – 1-15	Tyrone

Pearse Park, Longford
Referee: John Niland

10 August 2013
4:15 p.m.
Second round

Laois	1-14 – 0-7	Meath

Birr
Referee: Michael John O'Keeffe

10 August 2013
6 p.m.
Second round

Armagh	2-9 – 0-16	Cork

Birr
Referee: Seán Joy

=== Finals ===
17 August 2013
4:15 p.m.
Quarter-final

Tyrone	2-5 – 2-20	Galway

Breffni Park, Cavan
Referee: Terence McShea

17 August 2013
6 p.m.
Quarter-final

Monaghan	4-21 – 0-4	Laois

Breffni Park, Cavan

24 August 2013
12:30 p.m.
Quarter-final

Mayo	2-13 – 2-14	Kerry

Birr
Referee: Keith Delahunty

24 August 2013
2:15 p.m.
Quarter-final

Cork	1-19 – 2-12	Dublin

Birr
Referee: John Niland

31 August 2013
Semi-final

Monaghan	0-16 – 0-11	Galway
	Report

Breffni Park, Cavan

7 September 2013
4 p.m.
Semi-final

Cork	2-9 – 0-11	Kerry

Semple Stadium, Thurles
Referee: Maggie Farrelly

29 September 2013

Cork	1–10; 1–9	Monaghan
Valerie Mulcahy (1-4); Juliet Murphy (0-2); Nollaig Cleary (0-2); Geraldine O'Flynn (0-1); Annie Walsh (0-1)		Catriona McConnell (0-4); Linda Martin (1-0); Caoimhe Mohan (0-2); Laura McEnaney (0-1); Therese McNally (0-1); Ciara McAnespie (0-1)

Croke Park, Dublin
Attendance: 25,103
Referee: John Niland (Sligo)
