= 2015 All-Ireland Senior Ladies' Football Championship =

All-Ireland Senior Ladies' Football Championship 2015
Championship details
- Dates: 14 June – 27 September 2015
- Teams: 14

All-Ireland champions
- Winners: Cork (10th win)
- Captain: Ciara O'Sullivan
- Manager: Éamonn Ryan

All Ireland Runners-up
- Runners-up: Dublin
- Captain: Lyndsey Davey
- Manager: Gregory McGonigle

Provincial champions
- Connacht: Galway
- Leinster: Dublin
- Munster: Kerry
- Ulster: Donegal

Championship Statistics

The 2015 All-Ireland Senior Ladies' Football Championship is the 42nd edition of the Ladies' Gaelic Football Association's premier inter-county Ladies' Gaelic football tournament since its establishment in 1974. It is known for sponsorship reasons as the TG4 All-Ireland Senior Ladies' Football Championship. It commenced on 14 June 2015.

== Provincial championships ==
=== Connacht Championship ===
12 July 2015
Final

Mayo	1-17 - 0-21	Galway

MacHale Park, Castlebar

=== Leinster Championship ===
14 June 2015
1 p.m. IST
Round-robin

Westmeath	1-15 - 0-11	Laois

Cusack Park, Mullingar

21 June 2015
3 p.m. IST
Round-robin

Meath	0-8 - 5-10	Laois

Walterstown GAA Grounds, Walterstown

28 June 2015
3 p.m. IST
Round-robin

Meath	1-5 - 3-15	Westmeath

	Team	Pld	W	D	L	SF	SA	SD	Pts
1	Westmeath	2	2	0	0	4-30	1-16	23	4
2	Laois	2	1	0	1	5-21	1-23	10	2
3	Meath	2	0	0	2	1-13	8-25	–33	0

5 July 2015
3 p.m. IST
Semi-Final

Dublin	1-17 - 1-7	Laois

19 July 2015
4 p.m. IST
Final

Westmeath	0-11 - 2-12	Dublin

Dr. Cullen Park, Carlow

=== Munster Championship ===
11 July 2015
6 p.m. IST
Final

Cork	2-4 - 2-13	Kerry

Carrigoon GAA Grounds, Mallow

=== Ulster Championship ===
20 June 2015
3 p.m. IST
Quarter-Final

Cavan	0-14 - 1-12	Tyrone

Brewster Park, Fermanagh

20 June 2015
5 p.m. IST
Quarter-Final

Down	0-4 - 10-35	Donegal

Brewster Park, Fermanagh

5 July 2015
2 p.m. IST
Semi-Final

Tyrone	1-7 - 3-19	Donegal

Breffni Park, Cavan

5 July 2015
4 p.m. IST
Semi-Final

Monaghan	2-19 - 2-7	Armagh

Breffni Park, Cavan

26 July 2015
3.15 p.m. IST
Final

Donegal	2-12 - 1-10	Monaghan

St. Tiernach's Park, Clones

== All-Ireland Qualifiers ==
The ten teams beaten in the provincial championships contest the qualifiers. Two matches are played in a preliminary round to eliminate two teams. The eight remaining teams play four matches and the four winners play the four provincial champions in the All-Ireland quarter-finals.

25 July 2015
4 p.m. IST
Preliminary round

Cavan	10-35 - 0-3	Down

St. Tiernach's Park, Clones

25 July 2015
6 p.m. IST
Preliminary round

Armagh	3-22 - 3-7	Laois

St. Tiernach's Park, Clones

1 August 2015
2 p.m. IST
Qualifier

Mayo	4-15 - 0-3	Tyrone

Ballinamore GAA Club, Leitrim

3 August 2015
3 p.m. IST
Qualifier

Cork	7-22 - 0-3	Meath

Semple Stadium, Thurles

8 August 2015
5.15 p.m. IST
Qualifier

Cavan	1-4 - 4-13	Monaghan

Breffni Park, Cavan

8 August 2015
7.15 p.m. IST
Qualifier

Armagh	1-12 - 0-9	Westmeath

Breffni Park, Cavan

== All-Ireland ==
=== All-Ireland Quarter-Finals ===
The four provincial champions play the four winners from the qualifiers.

15 August 2015
4.15 p.m. IST
Quarter-final

Kerry	2-13 - 1-8	Mayo

Gaelic Grounds, Limerick

15 August 2015
6 p.m. IST
Quarter-final

Galway	1-10 - 1-12	Cork

Gaelic Grounds, Limerick

22 August 2015
12.30 p.m. IST
Quarter-final

Donegal	2-11 - 2-13	Armagh

St. Tiernach's Park, Clones

22 August 2015
2.15 p.m. IST
Quarter-final

Dublin	1-13 - 0-13	Monaghan

St. Tiernach's Park, Clones

=== All-Ireland Semi-Finals ===
29 August 2015
6:00 pm
Semi-final

Kerry	0-13 - 4-14	Cork

Gaelic Grounds

5 September 2015
2:00 pm
Semi-final

Armagh	2-5 - 2-16	Dublin

Parnell Park
Referee: G Carmody (Mayo)

=== All-Ireland final ===
27 September 2015

Cork	0–12; 0–10	Dublin
Valerie Mulcahy (0-7); Doireann O'Sullivan (0-2); Rena Buckley (0-1); Ciara O'Sullivan (0-1); Eimear Scally (0-1)		Carla Rowe (0-6); Amy Connolly (0-1); Niamh McEvoy (0-1); Lyndsey Davey (0-1); Sarah McCaffrey (0-1)

Croke Park, Dublin
Attendance: 31,083
Referee: John Niland (Sligo)
