= 2019 Ladies' National Football League =

League details
- Dates: 2 February – 5 May 2019
- Teams: 32

League champions
- Winners: Cork (12th win)
- Captain: Martina O'Brien
- Manager: Ephie Fitzgerald

League runners-up
- Runners-up: Galway
- Captain: Tracey Leonard
- Manager: Timmy Rabbitte

Other division winners
- Division 2: Waterford
- Division 3: Meath
- Division 4: Fermanagh

The 2019 Ladies' National Football League, known for sponsorship reasons as the Lidl Ladies' National Football League, is a ladies' Gaelic football competition taking place in early 2019.

Cork were the champions, defeating Galway in the final to win a record 12th league title.

== Format ==
=== League structure ===
The 2019 Ladies' National Football League consists of four divisions of eight teams. Each team plays every other team in its division once. 3 points are awarded for a win and 1 for a draw.

Teams by Province
Province	Division 1	Division 2	Division 3	Division 4
Connacht	2	0	2	1
Leinster	2	2	5	3
Munster	2	3	0	1
Ulster	2	3	1	3

If two teams are level on points, the tie-break is:

- winners of the head-to-head game are ranked ahead
- if the head-to-head match was a draw, then whichever team scored more points in the game is ranked ahead (e.g. 1-15 beats 2–12)
- if the head-to-head match was an exact draw, ranking is determined by the points difference (i.e. total scored minus total conceded in all games)
- if the points difference is equal, ranking is determined by the total scored

If three or more teams are level on league points, rankings are determined solely by points difference.

=== Finals, promotions and relegations ===
The top four teams in Division 1 contest the Ladies' National Football League semi-finals (first plays fourth and second plays third).

The top four teams in divisions 2, 3 and 4 contest the semi-finals of their respective divisions. The division champions are promoted.

The last-placed teams in divisions 1, 2 and 3 are relegated.

== Division 1 ==
=== Table ===
Pos	Team	Pld	W	D	L	PF	PA	PD	Pts	Qualification or relegation
1	Galway	7	6	0	1	106	73	+33	18	Advance to Semi-Finals
2	Cork (C)	7	5	0	2	139	71	+68	15	Advance to Semi-Finals
3	Dublin	7	5	0	2	125	99	+26	15	Advance to Semi-Finals
4	Donegal	7	5	0	2	100	99	+1	15	Advance to Semi-Finals
5	Mayo	7	2	1	4	109	131	−22	7	
6	Westmeath	7	2	0	5	88	97	−9	6	
7	Tipperary	7	2	0	5	116	149	−33	6	
8	Monaghan	7	0	1	6	88	152	−64	1	Relegation to Division 2

Updated to match(es) played on 7 April 2019. Source: ladiesgaelic.ie

=== Semi-finals ===
April 20, 2019
14:15 IST
Semi-Final 1

Report

Galway	1-12 (15) – (09) 1-06	Donegal

Pearse Park, Longford
Referee: Brendan Rice

April 21, 2019
14:00 IST
Semi-Final 2

Report

Cork	1-18 (21) – (20) 2-14	Dublin

Nowlan Park, Kilkenny
Referee: Niall McCormack

=== Final ===
May 5, 2019
16:00 IST
LNFL Final

Report

Galway	2-07 (13) – (15) 1-12	Cork
Gls: C Cooney 1, L Ward 1 Pts: R Leonard 3 (2f), T Leonard 2 (fs), M Glynn 1, L Hannon 1		Gls: S Noonan 1 Pts: O Finn 5 (3f), E Scally 3, C O’Sullivan 2, L Coppinger 1, N Cotter 1

Parnell Park, Donnycarney
Referee: M Farrelly (Cavan)

== Division 2 ==
=== Table ===
Pos	Team	Pld	W	D	L	PF	PA	PD	Pts	Qualification or relegation
1	Armagh	7	6	0	1	146	88	+58	18	Advance to Semi-Finals
2	Waterford (P)	7	4	1	2	106	102	+4	13	Advance to Semi-Finals
3	Cavan	7	4	1	2	124	117	+7	13	Advance to Semi-Finals
4	Kerry	7	3	2	2	160	146	+14	11	Advance to Semi-Finals
5	Clare	7	3	2	2	104	106	−2	11	
6	Wexford	7	2	1	4	79	110	−31	7	
7	Tyrone	7	2	1	4	91	90	+1	7	
8	Laois	7	0	0	7	106	157	−51	0	Relegation to Division 3

Updated to match(es) played on 14 April 2019. Source: ladiesgaelic.ie
- Kerry are ranked ahead of Clare because, although the head-to-head game was a draw, Kerry scored more points (1–17 to 4–8).

=== Semi-finals ===
April 20, 2019
13:30 IST
Semi-Final 1

Armagh	1-11 (14) – (21) 2-15	Kerry

Geraldine Park, Athy
Referee: Jonathan Murphy

April 21, 2019
13:30 IST
Semi-Final 2

Cavan	5-13 (28) – (15) 2-09	Waterford

St Rynagh's Park, Banagher
Referee: Shane Curley

=== Final ===
May 5, 2019
14:00 IST
Final

Report

Kerry	(20) 1-17 – 5-13 (28)	Waterford

Parnell Park, Donnycarney
Referee: G Chapman (Sligo)

== Division 3 ==
=== Table ===
Pos	Team	Pld	W	D	L	PF	PA	PD	Pts	Qualification or relegation
1	Meath (P)	7	6	0	1	150	88	+62	18	Advance to Semi-Finals
2	Sligo	7	5	0	2	132	112	+20	15	Advance to Semi-Finals
3	Roscommon	7	5	0	2	125	108	+17	15	Advance to Semi-Finals
4	Longford	7	3	1	3	132	125	+7	10	Advance to Semi-Finals
5	Wicklow	7	3	0	4	116	118	−2	9	
6	Kildare	7	3	0	4	122	111	+11	9	
7	Down	7	2	0	5	111	120	−9	6	
8	Offaly	7	0	1	6	88	194	−106	1	Relegation to Division 4

Updated to match(es) played on 7 April 2019. Source: ladiesgaelic.ie

=== Semi-finals ===
April 20, 2019
12:30 IST
Semi-Final 2

Sligo	1-11 (14) – (12) 1-09	Roscommon

Pearse Park, Longford
Referee: Des McEnery

April 20, 2019
14:45 IST
Semi-Final 1

Meath	5-18 (33) – (19) 3-10	Longford

Coralstown/Kinnegad GAA, Kinnegad
Referee: John Devlin

=== Final ===
May 4, 2019
16:00 IST
Final

Report

Meath	4-11 (23) – (10) 1-07	Sligo

St Tiernach's Park, Clones
Referee: E Moran (Kerry)

== Division 4 ==
=== Table ===
Pos	Team	Pld	W	D	L	PF	PA	PD	Pts	Qualification or relegation
1	Louth	7	6	0	1	171	71	+100	18	Advance to Semi-Finals
2	Limerick	7	5	0	2	130	87	+43	15	Advance to Semi-Finals
3	Fermanagh (P)	7	5	0	2	126	86	+40	15	Advance to Semi-Finals
4	Antrim	7	4	1	2	132	103	+29	13	Advance to Semi-Finals
5	Carlow	7	4	0	3	119	109	+10	12	
6	Leitrim	7	2	0	5	115	115	0	6	
7	Derry	7	1	1	5	87	112	−25	4	
8	Kilkenny	7	0	0	7	34	231	−197	0	

Updated to match(es) played on 14 April 2019. Source: ladiesgaelic.ie

=== Semi-finals ===
April 20, 2019
12:30 IST
Semi-Final 1

Louth	2-14 (20) – (26) 2-20	Antrim

St Tiernach's Park, Clones
Referee: Declan Callaghan

April 20, 2019
13:00 IST
Semi-Final 2

Report

Fermanagh	2-15 (21) – (19) 4-07	Limerick

Coralstown/Kinnegad GAA, Kinnegad
Referee: Paul Burke

=== Final ===
May 4, 2019
14:00 IST
Final

Report

Antrim	1-10 (13) – (14) 2-08	Fermanagh

St Tiernach's Park, Clones
Referee: S Curley (Galway)
