= Cork county ladies' football team =

Ladies Gaelic football team

Cork
- Sport: Ladies' football
- Irish: Corcaigh
- Nickname(s): The Rebelettes, The Leesiders
- Home venue(s): Cork Institute of Technology
First colours	Second colours

The Cork county ladies' football team represents Cork GAA in ladies' Gaelic football. The team competes in inter-county competitions such as the All-Ireland Senior Ladies' Football Championship, the Munster Senior Ladies' Football Championship and the Ladies' National Football League.

After winning their first All-Ireland and League titles in 2005, Cork went on to dominate both competitions during the late 2000s and the 2010s. Between 2005 and 2009 Cork were All-Ireland champions five times in a row. They then achieved an All-Ireland six in a row between 2011 and 2016. During this era they also won eleven consecutive League titles. In 2014 the Cork senior ladies' football team also won the RTÉ Sports Team of the Year Award.

== History ==
=== Early years ===
In 1973, during a carnival at Banteer, Cork played Kerry in an inter-county game. Kerry won by 5–10 to 4–11. The match was refereed by Dinny Long, the Cork senior men's footballer. In 1974, together with Kerry, Roscommon, Laois, Offaly, Galway, Waterford and Tipperary, Cork was one of eight GAA counties who played in the inaugural All-Ireland Senior Ladies' Football Championship. Cork and the other three Munster counties also agreed to play an inaugural Munster Senior Ladies' Football Championship. After thirty years living very much in the shadow of their neighbours, Kerry and Waterford, Cork won their first Munster title in 2004 and their first senior All-Ireland title in 2005.

=== Senior final appearances ===
All-Irelands

Between 2005 and 2016, with a team that included Valerie Mulcahy, Juliet Murphy, Angela Walsh, Mary O'Connor, Rena Buckley and Briege Corkery, Cork won eleven All-Ireland titles. In 2014, after winning their ninth title, Cork won the RTÉ Sports Team of the Year Award. They were the first female team to win the award. They received 27% of the vote, beating the Ireland men's national rugby union team, winners of the 2014 Six Nations Championship, by 11%.

Season	Winner	Score	Runners–up
2005	Cork	1–11; 0–8	Galway
2006	Cork	1–7; 1–6	Armagh
2007	Cork	2–11; 2–6	Mayo
2008	Cork	4–13; 0–11	Monaghan
2009	Cork	1–9; 0–11	Dublin
2011	Cork	2–7; 0–11	Monaghan
2012	Cork	0–16; 0-7	Kerry
2013	Cork	1-10; 1-9	Monaghan
2014	Cork	2–13; 2-12	Dublin
2015	Cork	0-12; 0-10	Dublin
2016	Cork	1-7; 1-6	Dublin
2018	Dublin	3-11; 1-12	Cork

Ladies' National Football League

Season	Winner	Score	Runners–up
1993	Laois		Cork
2005	Cork		Galway
2006	Cork		Meath
2008	Cork		Kerry
2009	Cork		Mayo
2010	Cork		Galway
2011	Cork		Laois
2012	Monaghan		Cork
2013	Cork		Mayo
2014	Cork		Dublin
2015	Cork		Galway
2016	Cork		Mayo
2017	Cork	2–15;2–14	Donegal
2019	Cork	1–12;2–7	Galway

Munster Senior Ladies' Football Championship

Season	Winner	Score	Runners–up
2004	Cork	4–13;1–9	Kerry
2005	Cork	2–15;1–8	Kerry
2006	Cork	1–17;1–5	Waterford
2007	Cork	3–7;1–6	Waterford
2008	Cork		Kerry
2009	Cork		Kerry
2010	Cork	5–13;2–9	Clare
2011	Cork	2–15;0–12	Kerry
2012	Cork		Kerry ?
2013	Kerry		Cork
2014	Cork		
2015	Kerry	2–13;2–4	Cork
2016	Cork	2–8;0–7	Kerry
2018	Cork	5–13;2–10	Kerry
2019	Cork	2–14;0–9	Waterford

== Notable players ==
=== TG4 Senior Player's Player of the Year ===
Season	
2011	Juliet Murphy
2012	Briege Corkery
2013	Geraldine O'Flynn
2015	Briege Corkery
2016	Bríd Stack

=== All Stars ===
Season	
2020	Martina O'Brien, Eimear Meaney, Melissa Duggan, Áine O'Sullivan
2019	Melissa Duggan, Orla Finn
2018	Róisín Phelan, Emma Spillane, Ciara O'Sullivan, Doireann O'Sullivan
2017	Emma Spillane
2016	Marie Ambrose, Bríd Stack, Deirdre O'Reilly, Briege Corkery, Ciara O'Sullivan, Orla Finn
2015	Marie Ambrose, Geraldine O'Flynn, Vera Foley, Briege Corkery, Rena Buckley, Valerie Mulcahy
2014	Angela Walsh, Bríd Stack, Vera Foley, Geraldine O'Flynn, Ciara O'Sullivan
2013	Deirdre O'Reilly, Briege Corkery, Geraldine O'Flynn, Juliet Murphy, Valerie Mulcahy
2012	Elaine Harte, Bríd Stack, Briege Corkery, Rena Buckley, Geraldine O'Flynn, Ciara O'Sullivan, Valerie Mulcahy
2011	Deirdre O'Reilly, Briege Corkery, Bríd Stack, Geraldine O'Flynn, Juliet Murphy, Rena Buckley, Rhóna Ní Bhuachalla
2010	Bríd Stack
2009	Angela Walsh, Geraldine O'Flynn, Briege Corkery, Juliet Murphy, Norita Kelly, Nollaig Cleary
2008	Elaine Harte, Linda Barrett, Angela Walsh, Briege Corkery, Bríd Stack, Juliet Murphy, Nollaig Cleary
2007	Angela Walsh, Rena Buckley, Bríd Stack, Briege Corkery, Juliet Murphy, Valerie Mulcahy, Deirdre O'Reilly
2006	Angela Walsh, Rena Buckley, Nollaig Cleary, Mary O'Connor
2005	Angela Walsh, Briege Corkery, Juliet Murphy, Deirdre O'Reilly, Valerie Mulcahy
2004	Rena Buckley, Valerie Mulcahy
1995	Fiona O'Driscoll
1993	Margaret Buckley
1985	Joan Shannon, Mairead O'Leary

=== Ireland internationals ===
A number of Cork ladies' footballers have also represented Ireland at international level in various other sports.

Players	Sport
Rena Buckley	International Rules Football
Megan Connolly	Association football; represented Cork at under-16 level.
Norita Kelly	International Rules Football
Juliet Murphy	International Rules Football
Saoirse Noonan	Association football
Angela Walsh	International Rules Football

== Managers ==
- Éamonn Ryan
- Ephie Fitzgerald
- Mary Collins

== Honours ==
- All-Ireland Senior Ladies' Football Championship
  - Winners: 2005, 2006, 2007, 2008, 2009, 2011, 2012, 2013, 2014, 2015, 2016: 11
  - Runners up: 2018: 1
- Ladies' National Football League
  - Winners: 2005, 2006, 2008, 2009, 2010, 2011, 2013, 2014, 2015, 2016, 2017, 2019: 12
  - Runners up: 1993, 2012: 2
- Munster Senior Ladies' Football Championship
  - Winners: 2004, 2005, 2006, 2008, 2009, 2010, 2011, 2012, 2014, 2015, 2016, 2018, 2019: 13
  - Runners up: 2013: 1
- RTÉ Sports Team of the Year Award
  - 2014
