= Annette Clarke =

Irish sportswoman

Personal information
- Native name: Áine Ní Chléirigh (Irish)
- Nickname: Clarkie
- Born: 1983 (age 42–43) Lavally
- Occupation: Garda

Sport
- Sport: Ladies' football
- Position: Midfielder
Club
- Years: Club
- Kilkerrin-Clonberne
Inter-county
- Years: County
- 1997–2016: Galway
Inter-county titles
- All-Irelands: 1
- All Stars: 2

Annette Clarke (born 1983; married name Annette Collins) is an Irish sportswoman. She played ladies' Gaelic football with her local club, Kilkerrin-Clonberne, and with the Galway county team.

== Playing career ==
Clarke won the All-Ireland Junior Ladies' Football Championship with Galway in 2002, and captained Galway to the All-Ireland Senior Ladies' Football Championship in 2004.

She suffered a near-career-ending injury in 2010 and was dropped from the Galway squad in 2012. Clarke, however, returned to the Galway squad, winning a second All Star in 2013 and captaining her club to a Connacht Ladies Senior Club Football Championship in 2014. She retired in 2016.

She appeared on an episode of Laochra Gael on 17 April 2016.

== Personal life ==
Annette Clarke is a member of Garda Síochána, the Irish police. She is married to Kieran Collins.
