= Briege Corkery =

Dual Cork Camogie and Gaelic Football player

Personal information
- Native name: Bríd Ní Chorcora (Irish)
- Born: 16 December 1986 (age 39) Cork, Ireland

Sport
- Sport: Ladies' Gaelic football and camogie
- Position: Mid field
Clubs
- Years: Club
- Cloughduv and St Val's
Club titles
- Cork titles: 3
Inter-county
- Years: County
- 2001–2019: Cork
Inter-county titles
- All-Irelands: 18
- All Stars: 16

Briege Corkery (born 16 December 1986) in Cork is a camogie player, ladies' Gaelic footballer, and winner of seven All Ireland Senior Camogie medals in 2005, 2006, 2008, 2009, 2014, 2015 and 2018 as well as the winner of eleven All Ireland Senior Ladies' Football medals in 2005, 2006, 2007, 2008, 2009, 2011, 2012, 2013, 2014, 2015 and 2016.

She has won six Camogie All Stars Awards in 2006, 2008, 2009, 2012, 2014 and 2015. She has also won ten Ladies' Football All Stars Awards in 2005, 2007, 2008, 2009, 2011, 2012, 2013, 2014, 2015 and 2016. In 2008, she became the sixth camogie player in history to be awarded the Texaco Player of the Year award. Corkery is one of the most successful GAA players in history, winning 18 All-Ireland Medals. Teammate Rena Buckley, winner of a record-breaking 18 All-Irelands, had been joint all time medal winner with Corkery up until 2016. She featured in TG4's 2021 season of Laochra Gael showcasing her life and achievements.

== Career ==
Corkery is the holder of three county Senior championship medals as well as Minor, Intermediate and Senior All-Ireland and Munster honours. She is also a Gaelic footballer and scored a goal in Cork's 2009 All-Ireland semi-final win over Mayo. She was named as national female sports person of the year in 2005 following her performances both in camogie and football. Corkery is also a dual All Star, and won a monthly award from 96/103fm and the Rochestown Park Hotel following the 2008 season. Her brother, Donal Corkery, won a Cork County Junior A League with Cloughduv in 2012.

== Honours ==
=== Ladies' Gaelic football ===
Cork

- All-Ireland Senior Ladies' Football Championship
  - Winners: 2005, 2006, 2007, 2008, 2009, 2011, 2012, 2013, 2014, 2015, 2016: 11
- Ladies' National Football League
  - 2005, 2006, 2008, 2009, 2010, 2011, 2013, 2014, 2015, 2016, 2017: 11
- RTÉ Sports Team of the Year Award

=== Camogie ===
Cork

- All-Ireland Senior Camogie Championship
  - Winners: 2005, 2006, 2008, 2009, 2014, 2015, 2018: 7
  - Runners-up: 2004, 2007, 2012, 2016: 4
- National Camogie League
  - Winners: 2006, 2007, 2012: 3

=== Individual ===
- The Irish Times/ Sport Ireland Sportswoman of the Year
- Ladies' Gaelic Football All Stars Awards
  - Winner: 2005, 2007, 2008, 2009, 2011, 2012, 2013, 2014, 2015, 2016: 10
- Camogie All Stars
  - Winner: 2006, 2008, 2009, 2012, 2014, 2015: 6
