= 2014 All-Ireland Senior Ladies' Football Championship =

Gaelic football tournament

All-Ireland Senior Ladies' Football Championship 2014
Championship details
- Dates: 26 July – 28 September 2014
- Teams: 15

All-Ireland champions
- Winners: Cork (9th win)
- Captain: Briege Corkery
- Manager: Eamonn Ryan

All Ireland Runners-up
- Runners-up: Dublin
- Captain: Sinéad Goldrick
- Manager: Gregory McGonigle

Provincial champions

Championship Statistics

The 2014 All-Ireland Senior Ladies' Football Championship is the 41st edition of the Ladies' Gaelic Football Association's premier inter-county Ladies' Gaelic football tournament. It is known for sponsorship reasons as the TG4 All-Ireland Senior Ladies' Football Championship. It will commence on 26 July 2014.

== Fixtures ==
=== Qualifying rounds ===
26 July 2014
7 p.m.
First round

Cavan	1-15 — 0-13	Meath

Páirc Tailteann
Referee: Paul Swift

26 July 2014
5:15 p.m.
First round

Kildare	1-13 — 3-17	Tyrone

Páirc Tailteann
Referee: Eugene O'Hare

26 July 2014
4 p.m.
First round

Clare	0-10 — 1-13	Westmeath

St. Brendan's Park
Referee: Keith Delahunty

4 August 2014
4 p.m.
Second round

Donegal	2-14 — 1-22	Kerry

St. Brendan's Park
Referee: Des McEnery

9 August 2014
2:15 p.m.
Second round

Mayo	3-8 — 1-13	Westmeath

Pearse Park
Referee: Maggie Farrelly

9 August 2014
3:45 p.m.
Second round

Cavan	0-10 — 3-10	Laois

St. Peregrines, Clonsilla
Referee: Mags Doherty

9 August 2014
Second round

Monaghan	1-16 — 3-7	Tyrone

Pearse Park
Referee: Yvonne Duffy

=== Finals ===
16 August 2014
4:15 p.m.
Quarter-final

Armagh	5-17 — 0-9	Laois

O'Connor Park
Referee: Gus Chapman

16 August 2014
6 p.m.
Quarter-final

Cork	1-15 — 0-9	Mayo

O'Connor Park
Referee: Gavin Corrigan

23 August 2014
Quarter-final

Dublin	2-12 — 1-10	Kerry

St. Brendan's Park
Referee: John Niland

23 August 2014
Quarter-final

Galway	0-17 — 0-14	Monaghan

St. Brendan's Park
Referee: Keith Delahunty

30 August 2014
3:15 p.m.
Semi-final

Dublin	2-14 — 1-13	Galway
	Report

Cusack Park (Mullingar)
Referee: Maggie Farrelly (Cavan)

6 September 2014
3:30 p.m.
Semi-final

Armagh	2-11 — 5-16	Cork
	Report

Pearse Park
Referee: Gus Chapman

28 September 2014

Cork	2–13; 2–12	Dublin
Rhona Ní Bhuachalla (2-1); Valerie Mulcahy (0-6); Eimear Scally (1-0); Geraldine O'Flynn (0-3); Orla Finn (0-2); Ciara O'Sullivan (0-1)		Lindsay Peat (2-0); Lyndsey Davey (0-3); Sinéad Aherne (0-3); Noëlle Healy (0-2); Carla Rowe (0-2); Sinéad Goldrick (0-1); Siobhan Woods (0-1)

Croke Park, Dublin
Attendance: 27,374
Referee: Maggie Farrelly (Cavan)
