= 2017 All-Ireland Senior Camogie Championship final =

2017 All-Ireland Senior Camogie Championship Final
- Event: 2017 All-Ireland Senior Camogie Championship
Cork	Kilkenny
0–10	0–9
- Date: 10 September 2017
- Venue: Croke Park, Dublin
- Referee: Owen Elliott (Antrim)
- Weather: 14 °C, rain

The 2017 All-Ireland Senior Camogie Championship Final, the 86th event of its kind and the culmination of the 2017 All-Ireland Senior Camogie Championship, was played at Croke Park in Dublin on 10 September 2017.

== Details ==
10 September 2017
4 p.m.

Cork	0–10 – 0–9	Kilkenny
O Cronin 0-3, A.O'Connor 0-2, O.Cotter 0-2, K.Mackey 0-1, G.O'Connor 0-1, J.White 0-1	Report	M.Farrell 0-2, D.Gaule 0-2, J A Malone 0-2, K.Power 0-1, S.Farrell 0-1, M.Walsh 0-1

Croke Park, Dublin
Attendance: 20,438
Referee: Owen Elliott (Antrim)
