= 2017 Ladies' National Football League =

League details
- Dates: 29 January – 14 May 2017
- Teams: 32

League champions
- Winners: Cork (11th win)
- Captain: Doireann O'Sullivan (final); Ciara O'Sullivan (other games)
- Manager: Ephie Fitzgerald

League runners-up
- Runners-up: Donegal
- Captain: Geraldine McLaughlin
- Manager: Michael Naughton

Other division winners
- Division 2: Westmeath
- Division 3: Tipperary
- Division 4: Longford

The 2017 Ladies' National Football League, known for sponsorship reasons as the Lidl Ladies' National Football League, was a ladies' Gaelic football competition that took place from January to May 2017. Cork were the Division 1 champions for the fifth year in a row.

== Format ==
=== League structure ===
The 2017 Ladies' National Football League consists of four divisions of eight teams. Each team plays every other team in its division once. Three league points are awarded for a win and one for a draw.

If two teams are level on league points, the tie-break is -

- winners of the head-to-head game are ranked ahead
- if the head-to-head match was a draw, ranking is determined by the score difference (i.e. total scored minus total conceded in all games)
- if the score difference is equal, ranking is determined by the total scored

If three or more teams are level on league points, rankings are determined solely by score difference.

=== Finals, promotions and relegations ===
The top four teams in Division 1 contest the Ladies' National Football League semi-finals (first plays fourth and second plays third).

The top four teams in divisions 2, 3 and 4 contest the semi-finals of their respective divisions. The division champions are promoted.

The last-placed teams in divisions 1, 2 and 3 are relegated.

== Division 1 ==
=== Division 1 Table ===
Team	Pld	W	D	L	Diff	Pts	Notes
Donegal	7	5	0	2	+26	15	Advance to LNFL semi-finals
Cork (C)	7	5	0	2	+23	15	Advance to LNFL semi-finals
Dublin	7	4	0	3	+5	12	Advance to LNFL semi-finals
Galway	7	4	0	3	+3	12	Advance to LNFL semi-finals
Mayo	7	3	0	4	–10	9
Kerry	7	3	0	4	–16	9
Monaghan	7	2	0	5	–13	6
Armagh	7	2	0	5	–18	6	Relegated to Division 2 for 2018

- Monaghan defeated Armagh in a relegation playoff

=== Division 1 Semi-Finals ===
22 April 2017; 3:30 p.m. Semi-Final	Cork	1-16 – 0-13	Dublin	Nowlan Park, Kilkenny; Referee: Niall McCormack

23 April 2017; 2 p.m. Semi-Final	Donegal	5-11 – 1-07	Galway	Markievicz Park, Sligo; Referee: Gerry Carmody

=== Division 1 Final ===
7 May 2017; 4 p.m. Final	Cork	2-15 - 2-14	Donegal	Parnell Park, Donnycarney; Referee: Colm McManus
7 May 2017; 4 p.m. Final	Orla Finn 1-10 (0-9f), Eimear Scally 1-1, Brid O'Sullivan 0-2, Niamh Cotter and Libby Coppinger 0-1 each	Report	Geraldine McLaughlin 1-4 (0-1f), Niamh Hegarty 1-1, Karen Guthrie 0-4 (0-3f), Yvonne McMonagle 0-3, Katie Herron and Eilish Ward 0-1 each	Parnell Park, Donnycarney; Referee: Colm McManus

== Division 2 ==
=== Division 2 Table ===
Team	Pld	W	D	L	Diff	Pts	Notes
Westmeath (P)	7	5	0	2	+18	15	Advance to Division 2 semi-finals
Cavan	7	5	0	2	+32	15	Advance to Division 2 semi-finals
Clare	7	4	1	2	+22	13	Advance to Division 2 semi-finals
Laois	7	4	0	3	0	12	Advance to Division 2 semi-finals
Tyrone	7	4	0	3	–1	12
Sligo	7	3	0	4	–11	9
Waterford	7	2	1	4	+1	7
Kildare	7	0	0	7	–61	0	Relegated to Division 3 for 2018

- Westmeath are ranked ahead of Cavan as they won the head-to-head game between the teams
- Laois are ranked ahead of Tyrone as they won the head-to-head game between the teams

=== Division 2 Semi-Finals ===
23 April 2017; 1 p.m. Semi-Final	Westmeath	2-17 – 1-10	Laois	St Brendan's Park, Birr; Referee: Colm McManus

23 April 2017; 2:45 p.m. Semi-Final	Cavan	3-16 – 0-11	Clare	St Brendan's Park, Birr; Referee: Stephen McNulty

=== Division 2 Final ===
7 May 2017; 2 p.m. Final	Cavan	0-15 - 2-9	Westmeath	Parnell Park, Donnycarney; Referee: Seamus Mulvihill; Man of the Match: Ciara Blundell
7 May 2017; 2 p.m. Final	Aisling Doonan 0-7 (0-5f), Caitriona Smith and Claragh O'Reilly (0-1f) 0-2 each, Mona Sheridan, Sinead Greene, Donna English, Aishling Sheridan 0-1 each	Report	Ciara Blundell 2-0, Karen McDermott, Maud Annie Foley, Leona Archibald (0-2f), Johanna Maher 0-2 each, Fiona Claffey 0-1	Parnell Park, Donnycarney; Referee: Seamus Mulvihill; Man of the Match: Ciara Blundell

14 May 2017; Final Replay	Cavan	0-11 – 3-15	Westmeath	St Brendan's Park, Birr; Referee: B Rice (Down)
14 May 2017; Final Replay	A Doonan 0-6 (3f), C Smith & C O’Reilly (1f) 0-2 each	Report	L Archibold 1-6 (0-1f), L Brennan & C Blundell 1-1 each, L McCartan 0-3, M.A. Foley & L Walsh 0-2 each	St Brendan's Park, Birr; Referee: B Rice (Down)

== Division 3 ==
=== Division 3 Table ===
Team	Pld	W	D	L	Diff	Pts	Notes
Tipperary (P)	7	7	0	0	+93	21	Advance to Division 3 semi-finals
Wexford	7	6	0	1	+48	18	Advance to Division 3 semi-finals
Roscommon	7	4	1	2	+23	13	Advance to Division 3 semi-finals
Offaly	7	4	0	3	–15	12	Advance to Division 3 semi-finals
Leitrim	7	3	0	4	+1	9
Meath	7	2	1	4	–12	7
Down	7	1	0	6	–59	3
Limerick	7	0	0	7	–79	0	Relegated to Division 4 for 2018

=== Division 3 Semi-Finals ===
16 April 2017; 12:30 p.m. Semi-Final	Tipperary	7-17 – 2-6	Offaly	Conneff Park, Clane; Referee: Jason Mullins

16 April 2017; 2:15 p.m. Semi-Final	Wexford	5-8 – 0-9	Roscommon	Conneff Park, Clane; Referee: Gavin Corrigan

=== Division 3 Final ===
30 April 2017; 4 p.m. Final	Tipperary	0-12 - 2-6	Wexford	Conneff Park, Clane; Referee: John Niland; Man of the Match: Sarah Harding-Kenny
30 April 2017; 4 p.m. Final	Aisling McCarthy 0-7 (0-5f), Aishling Moloney 0-4 (0-1f), Mairead Morrissey 0-1	Report	Aisling Murphy 2-1, Fiona Rochford 0-3 (0-2f), Ellen O'Brien and Chantelle Martin 0-1 each	Conneff Park, Clane; Referee: John Niland; Man of the Match: Sarah Harding-Kenny

14 May 2017; 2 p.m. Final Replay	Tipperary	0-15 – 1-10	Wexford	St Brendan's Park, Birr; Man of the Match: Aishling Moloney
14 May 2017; 2 p.m. Final Replay	Aishling Moloney 0-6 (0-1f), Aisling McCarthy 0-5 (0-4f), Orla O'Dwyer 0-2, Jennie Grant and Gillian O'Brien 0-1 each		Fiona Rochford 1-4 (0-1f), Ellen O'Brien 0-2, Bernie Breen, Kellie Kearney, Catriona Murray, Aisling Murphy 0-1 each	St Brendan's Park, Birr; Man of the Match: Aishling Moloney

== Division 4 ==
=== Division 4 Table ===
Team	Pld	W	D	L	Diff	Pts	Notes
Longford (P)	7	7	0	0	+149	21	Advance to Division 4 semi-finals
Wicklow	7	6	0	1	+125	18	Advance to Division 4 semi-finals
Fermanagh	7	5	0	2	+24	15	Advance to Division 4 semi-finals
Carlow	7	4	0	3	–44	12	Advance to Division 4 semi-finals
Louth	7	3	0	4	–32	9
Antrim	7	2	0	5	–43	6
Derry	7	1	0	6	–76	3
Kilkenny	7	0	0	7	–103	0

=== Division 4 Semi-Finals ===
15 April 2017; 2 p.m. Semi-Final	Longford	5-19 – 2-4	Carlow	St. Finian's Park, Kinnitty; Referee: Garryowen McMahon

16 April 2017; 2 p.m. Semi-Final	Wicklow	0-12 – 2-3	Fermanagh	Stabannon Parnells, Stabannon; Referee: Angela Gallagher

=== Division 4 Final ===
30 April 2017; 2 p.m. Final	Longford	2-10 - 1-8	Wicklow	Clane; Referee: Niall McCormack; Man of the Match: Michelle Farrell
30 April 2017; 2 p.m. Final	Michelle Farrell 1-5 (0-3f), Sarah Tierney 1-2, Aisling Reynolds 0-3	Report	Katie Miley 1-0, Claire Walsh 0-3f, Amy Murphy 0-2, Jackie Kinch 0-1, Laurie Ahern 0-1, Helena Dowling 0-1	Clane; Referee: Niall McCormack; Man of the Match: Michelle Farrell
