= Niamh Kindlon =

Irish Gaelic footballer

Personal information
- Born: 22 July 1981 (age 45)
- Occupation: plumber

Sport
- Sport: Ladies' Football
- Position: Centre half forward
Club
- Years: Club
- Magheracloone Mitchell's
Inter-county
- Years: County
- 1997–2015: Monaghan
Inter-county titles
- All-Irelands: 1
- All Stars: 3

Niamh Kindlon (born 22 July 1981) is an Irish sportswoman. She played ladies' Gaelic football with her local club, Magheracloone Mitchell's, and with Monaghan.

== Sporting career ==
Kindlon won an All-Ireland with Monaghan in 1997. She won All-Stars in 1998, 2002 and 2008, and retired in 2015. She was the subject of an episode of Laochra Gael on 24 February 2015; a special preview took place in Carrickmacross.
