= Mary O'Connor (Irish sportsperson) =

Irish sportsperson (born 1977)

Personal information
- Native name: Maire Ní Chonchúir (Irish)
- Born: 1977 (age 48–49) Cork, Ireland

Sport
- Sport: Camogie
- Position: Full forward
Clubs
- Years: Club
- Killeagh (C); Donoughmore (F); Granagh-Ballingarry (F)
Club titles
- All-Ireland Titles: 2
Inter-county
- Years: County
- 1994–2009: Cork
Inter-county titles
- All-Irelands: 12
- All Stars: 4

Mary O'Connor (born 1977) is an Irish sportsperson. A dual player, she played both ladies' Gaelic football and camogie. As a footballer O Connor has played with her local clubs Donoughmore and Inch Rovers and was a member of the Cork county ladies' football team at the senior level from 1994 until 2010. She has won five All-Ireland titles. As a camogie player O'Connor played for her local club Killeagh and was a member of the Cork county camogie team at the senior level since 1996. Since then she has won seven All-Ireland titles. O'Connor is one of the most decorated players in the history of Gaelic games. Winner of All Ireland camogie medals in 1997 (when her last point of the first half off her left side, scored as she was in full flight 50 yards out, is regarded as one of the best scores in the history of camogie), 1998, 2002, 2005, 2006, 2008 and 2009 and All Star awards in 2005, 2006 and 2009.

== Career ==
She holds seven Senior All-Ireland and nine National League camogie medals as well as county, provincial and two All Ireland Club medals with Granagh-Ballingarry whom she played with while studying and working in Limerick.

== Awards ==
She was the overall winner of the 96/103fm Rochestown Park Hotel award following her performances in the All-Ireland and National League finals in 2006. she received the vodafone camogie player of the year award in 2006, As well as her three All Star awards she was nominated for further awards in 2004, 2008 and 2009, and received an unofficial Lynchpin award in 2003.

== Football ==
She captained Cork to a fifth successive All-Ireland football title in 2009 having won an All Star Award in ladies' football in 2006.

Sporting positions
Preceded by Angela Walsh	Cork Senior Ladies' Football Captain; 2009	Succeeded by Incumbent
Achievements
Preceded by Angela Walsh (Cork)	All-Ireland Senior Ladies' Football Final winning captain 2009	Succeeded by Denise Masterson (Dublin)
