= Bríd Stack =

Multi-sport athlete

Briege Stack
Personal information
- Native name: Bríd De Staic (Irish)
- Born: 2 May 1986 (age 40) Cork, Ireland

Sport
- Sport: Ladies' Gaelic football and Australian rules
- Position: full-back
Club
- Years: Club
- St Val's
Inter-county
- Years: County
- –2019: Cork
Inter-county titles
- All Stars: 7

Bríd Stack (/ˈbriːɪd stæk/ (born 16 December 1986) is a former All-Ireland winning former ladies' Gaelic footballer. Playing for Cork, she won the All-Ireland Ladies' Gaelic Football Championship 11 times, and was an Ladies' Gaelic Football All Stars Awards 7 times. She joined the Greater Western Sydney Giants women's Australian rules football team in 2021, but an injury in a pre-season practice match in January 2021 involving Adelaide's Ebony Marinoff prevented her from playing in the 2021 season.

== Gaelic football career ==
Stack won a record equalling 11 All Star Awards. She was the player of the match of the 2007 All-Ireland Final. She was nominated for RTÉ Sports Person of the Year in 2016.

== Australian rules ==
During a practice match in the 2021 pre-season, Stack collided with Adelaide's Ebony Marinoff, which caused a fractured vertebra for Stack. Marinoff was initially given a three-match suspension, the longest suspension in the competition's history to that point. Commentators such as Kane Cornes and his father, inaugural Crows AFL coach Graham Cornes, suggested that the incident was unavoidable and the club should appeal the decision. Adelaide eventually announced that it would appeal the decision, with the club calling it "grossly disproportionate" and coach Matthew Clarke calling the incident an "unavoidable footy collision". The suspension was eventually overturned by the appeals board after a hearing that lasted more than three hours, allowing Marinoff to play in the opening round of the season. In December 2022, Stack announced her retirement from football.

== Personal life ==
Stack is married to former Cork GAA U-21 player Carthach Keane. They have one son.
