= Éamonn Ryan =

Gaelic football player (1941–2021)

Personal information
- Native name: Éamonn Ó Riain (Irish)
- Born: 1941 Watergrasshill, County Cork, Ireland
- Died: 14 January 2021 (aged 79) Ballingeary, County Cork, Ireland
- Occupation: Primary school teacher
- Height: 5 ft 10 in (178 cm)

Sport
- Sport: Gaelic football
- Position: Right corner-forward
Clubs
- Years: Club
- Glenville; Watergrasshill; Imolkilly
Club titles
- Cork titles: 0
Inter-county
| Years | County | Apps (scores) |
| 1963–1968 | Cork | 10 (2–9) |
Inter-county titles
- Munster titles: 2
- All-Irelands: 0
- NFL: 0
- All Stars: 0

Éamonn Ryan (1941 – 14 January 2021) was an Irish football manager and player born in Watergrasshill, County Cork. He played football with his local clubs Glenville and UCC and was a member of the Cork senior inter-county team from 1963 until 1968. He played hurling with his local club Watergrasshill, winning East Cork junior A and Cork County junior A titles with the club in 1974. Ryan later served as manager of both the Cork senior men's and Cork senior ladies' football teams.

He managed the men's team from 1980 to 1984. He would return to the men's code as a selector in 2015 and was there up until approximately 2020.

Ryan, who steered the Cork ladies footballers to 10 All-Irelands in 11 years between 2005 and 2015 — including their first ever Brendan Martin Cup success in 2005 — had been battling illness. Cork also won nine national football leagues during his two stints at the helm, from 2004 to 2009 and from 2011 to 2015.

On 14 January 2021, Cork LGFA announced that he had died. He was 79.

Sporting positions
| Preceded by Billy Morgan | Cork Senior Football Manager; 1980-1984 | Succeeded by Denis Coughlan |
Achievements
| Preceded by Richard Bowles (Galway) | All-Ireland Senior Ladies' Football Final winning manager 2005-2009 | Succeeded by Gerry McGill (Dublin) |
| Preceded by Gerry McGill (Dublin) | All-Ireland Senior Ladies' Football Final winning manager 2011-2015 | Succeeded by Ephie Fitzgerald (Cork) |
