= Angela Walsh =

Irish Gaelic footballer

Personal information
- Native name: Angela Breathnach (Irish)
- Born: 1986 (age 39–40) Cork, Ireland

Sport
- Sport: Ladies' Gaelic football
- Position: Full Back
Club
- Years: Club
- Inch Rovers
Inter-county
- Years: County
- 2004–: Cork
Inter-county titles
- All-Irelands: 9
- All Stars: 6

Angela Walsh (born 1986) is an Irish sportsperson. She plays ladies' Gaelic football with her local club Inch Rovers and has been a member of the senior Cork county ladies' football team since 2004. Walsh captained Cork to a fourth consecutive All-Ireland title in 2008.

Sporting positions
Preceded by Juliet Murphy	Cork Senior Ladies' Football Captain; 2008	Succeeded by Mary O'Connor
Achievements
Preceded by Juliet Murphy (Cork)	All-Ireland Senior Ladies' Football Final winning captain 2008	Succeeded by Mary O'Connor (Cork)
