= Juliet Murphy =

Irish Gaelic footballer

Personal information
- Native name: Síle Ní Mhurchú (Irish)
- Born: Cork, Ireland
- Occupation: Teacher

Sport
- Sport: Ladies' Gaelic football
- Position: Midfield
Club
- Years: Club
- Donoughmore
Club titles
- Cork titles: 11
- Munster titles: 5
- All-Ireland Titles: 2
Inter-county
- Years: County
- 1995–2013: Cork
Inter-county titles
- Munster titles: 10
- All-Irelands: 8
- NFL: 9
- All Stars: 6

Juliet Murphy (born 1980 in Donoughmore, County Cork) is an Irish sportsperson. She plays ladies' Gaelic football with her local club Donoughmore and has been a member of the Cork county ladies' football team at senior level since 1995. Murphy captained Cork to the All-Ireland titles in 2005, 2006 and 2007. Her greatest feat was during the 2013 All-Ireland Championship when she came out of retirement to help Cork overcome fancied teams such as Dublin, Kerry and Monaghan and brought the Brendan Martin Cup back to Leeside for the 8th time in 9 years.

Sporting positions
Preceded by	Cork Senior Ladies' Football Captain; 2004-2007	Succeeded by Angela Walsh
Achievements
Preceded by Annette Clarke (Galway)	All-Ireland Senior Ladies' Football Final winning captain 2005-2007	Succeeded by Angela Walsh (Cork)
