= Nollaig Cleary =

Irish Gaelic footballer

Personal information
- Native name: Nollaig Ní Chléirigh (Irish)
- Born: 1981 (age 44–45) Castlehaven, County Cork, Ireland
- Occupation: Primary school teacher

Sport
- Sport: Gaelic football
- Position: Right wing-forward
Club
- Years: Club
- Gabriel Rangers
Inter-county
- Years: County
- 2004–2015: Cork
Inter-county titles
- Munster titles: 10
- All-Irelands: 9
- NFL: 8
- All Stars: 3

Nollaig Cleary-Uí Chróinín (born 1981) is an Irish retired ladies' Gaelic footballer who played as a right wing-forward for the Cork county ladies' football team.

Born in Castlehaven, County Cork, Cleary first played competitive Gaelic football in her youth. She made her senior debut during the 2004 championship. Cleary immediately became a regular member of the starting fifteen and won nine All-Ireland medals, ten Munster medals and eight National Football League medals.

At club level Cleary is a one-time All-Ireland medallist in the junior grade with Gabriel Rangers.

Cleary's brother, John Cleary, and her husband, Mícheál Ó Cróinín, also played with Cork.

After retiring from inter-county football in January 2013, Cleary later reversed her decision. She announced her second retirement from inter-county football on 4 June 2015.

== Honours ==
=== Player ===
Cork

- All-Ireland Senior Ladies' Football Championship (9): 2005, 2006, 2007, 2008, 2009, 2011, 2012, 2013, 2014
- Munster Senior Ladies' Football Championship (10): 2004, 2005, 2006, 2007, 2008, 2009, 2010, 2011, 2012, 2014
- Ladies' National Football League (8): 2005, 2006, 2008, 2009, 2010, 2011, 2014, 2015
