= List of AFL Women's players with international backgrounds =

This is a list of AFL Women's players who have multicultural ancestry (which includes players born overseas or who had one parent born overseas).

Bold indicates that the player is currently active.

== Active players born outside of Australia ==
Birthplace	Player	Debut	Current club	Ref.
Northern Ireland	Bláithín Bogue	2025	North Melbourne	
Ireland	Amy Boyle-Carr	2024	Adelaide	
Ireland	Ellie Brady	2026	Collingwood	
Ireland	Aoibhin Cleary	2025	Richmond	
Ireland	Kayleigh Cronin	2025	Adelaide	
Wales	Darcie Davies	2023	Gold Coast	
Wales	Fleur Davies	2023	Greater Western Sydney	
Ireland	Neasa Dooley	2025	Brisbane	
Ireland	Jennifer Dunne	2023	Brisbane	
England	Jade Ellenger	2019	Brisbane	
Germany	Emmelie Fiedler	2024	St Kilda	
Ireland	Dayna Finn	2023	Carlton	
Northern Ireland	Clara Fitzpatrick	2020	Gold Coast	
Ireland	Erone Fitzpatrick	2023	Carlton	
Ireland	Amy Gavin Mangan	2025	North Melbourne	
Ireland	Sinéad Goldrick	2020	Melbourne	
Kenya	Elaine Grigg	2024	Western Bulldogs	
Ireland	Aoife Healy	2026	Fremantle	
Ireland	Kellyann Hogan	2025	Collingwood	
Ireland	Aoife Horisk	2026	Melbourne	
Northern Ireland	Rhianna Ingram	2026	Gold Coast	
Ireland	Rachel Kearns	2022 (S6)	Geelong	
Ireland	Grace Kelly	2020	Adelaide	
Ireland	Niamh Kelly	2020	Adelaide	
Ireland	Tanya Kennedy	2023	Sydney	
Ireland	Kate Kenny	2024	Geelong	
Ireland	Orlagh Lally	2022 (S7)	Fremantle	
Ireland	Saoirse Lally	2026	St Kilda	
Samoa	Mua Laloifi	2020	Western Bulldogs	
Northern Ireland	Aimee Mackin	2023	Melbourne	
Northern Ireland	Blaithin Mackin	2022 (S7)	Melbourne	
Ireland	Niamh Martin	2023	Hawthorn	
Ireland	Aisling McCarthy	2019	Fremantle	
Ireland	Áine McDonagh	2022 (S7)	Hawthorn	
Ireland	Niamh McLaughlin	2023	Gold Coast	
Ireland	Aishling Moloney	2023	Geelong	
Northern Ireland	Ana Mulholland	2026	Richmond	
Ireland	Emma Murray	2026	Geelong	
Ireland	Siofra O'Connell	2025	Carlton	
Ireland	Eilish O'Dowd	2024	Greater Western Sydney	
Ireland	Erika O'Shea	2022 (S7)	North Melbourne	
Ireland	Julie O'Sullivan	2023	Sydney	
Ireland	Aisling Reidy	2025	Carlton	
Ireland	Sarah Rowe	2019	Collingwood	
New Zealand	Jesse Tawhiao-Wardlaw	2019	St Kilda	
Ireland	Áine Tighe	2019	Fremantle	
Ireland	Vikki Wall	2022 (S7)	North Melbourne	
New Zealand	Brooke Walker	2019	Essendon	

== Africa ==
=== Kenya ===
- **Elaine Grigg** (born in Kenya)

=== South Africa ===
- **Roxanne Roux**

=== South Sudan ===
- **Grace Baba**
- Akec Makur Chuot (born in South Sudan)

=== Zimbabwe ===
- **Roxanne Roux**
- **Charlotte Wilson**

== Americas ==
=== Canada ===
- **Ellie Hampson**
- **Tunisha Kikoak** (Inuk father)

=== United States ===
- Danielle Marshall (born in the United States)

=== Uruguay ===
- Courtney Munn

== Asia ==
=== Hong Kong ===
- Sophie Li (Hongkonger parents)

=== India ===
- Zoe Savarirayan (Indian heritage)

=== Japan ===
- Luka Yoshida-Martin

=== Lebanon ===
- Vivien Saad
- Haneen Zreika (Lebanese mother)

=== Malaysia ===
- **Emmelie Fiedler** (raised in Malaysia)
- Courtney Guard
- Amanda Ling (born in Malaysia)

=== Philippines ===
- Hannah Button (Filipino mother)
- Hannah Ewings
- Rachelle Martin (Filipino mother)
- Justine Mules-Robinson (Filipino mother)

=== South Korea ===
- **Lucy Single** (Korean mother)

=== Sri Lanka ===
- Chantella Perera (Sri Lankan parents)

=== Taiwan ===
- Joanna Lin (Taiwanese parents)

== Europe ==
=== Croatia ===
- Marijana Rajčić

=== Cyprus ===
- Evangeline Gooch

=== Denmark ===
- **Tessa Boyd** (Danish mother)
- Melissa Kuys

=== Germany ===
- **Emmelie Fiedler** (born in Germany to German mother)
- **Tahlia Hickie**

=== Ireland and Northern Ireland ===
- Muireann Atkinson (born in Ireland)
- **Bláithín Bogue** (born in Northern Ireland)
- Yvonne Bonner (born in Ireland)
- **Amy Boyle-Carr** (born in Ireland)
- **Ellie Brady** (born in Ireland)
- **Aoibhin Cleary** (born in Ireland)
- Ailish Considine (born in Ireland)
- Joanne Cregg (born in Ireland)
- **Kayleigh Cronin** (born in Ireland)
- Rosie Dillon
- **Neasa Dooley** (born in Ireland)
- Joanne Doonan (born in Ireland)
- **Jennifer Dunne** (born in Ireland)
- Laura Duryea (born in Ireland)
- **Dayna Finn** (born in Ireland)
- **Clara Fitzpatrick** (born in Northern Ireland)
- **Erone Fitzpatrick** (born in Ireland)
- Kate Flood (born in Ireland)
- **Amy Gavin Mangan** (born in Ireland)
- Aileen Gilroy (born in Ireland)
- **Sinéad Goldrick** (born in Ireland)
- **Aoife Healy** (born in Ireland)
- Katy Herron (born in Ireland)
- **Kellyann Hogan** (born in Ireland)
- **Aoife Horisk** (born in Ireland)
- **Rhianna Ingram** (born in Northern Ireland)
- **Rachel Kearns** (born in Ireland)
- **Grace Kelly** (born in Ireland)
- **Niamh Kelly** (born in Ireland)
- Anna-Rose Kennedy (born in Ireland)
- **Tanya Kennedy** (born in Ireland)
- **Kate Kenny** (born in Ireland)
- **Orlagh Lally** (born in Ireland)
- **Saoirse Lally** (born in Ireland)
- **Aimee Mackin** (born in Northern Ireland)
- **Blaithin Mackin** (born in Northern Ireland)
- Lauren Magee (born in Ireland)
- **Niamh Martin** (born in Ireland)
- **Aisling McCarthy** (born in Ireland)
- Cara McCrossan (born in Northern Ireland)
- Lauren McConville (born in Northern Ireland)
- **Áine McDonagh** (born in Ireland)
- Niamh McEvoy
- **Niamh McLaughlin** (born in Ireland)
- **Aishling Moloney** (born in Ireland)
- Amy Mulholland (born in Northern Ireland)
- **Ana Mulholland** (born in Northern Ireland)
- **Emma Murray** (born in Ireland)
- **Siofra O'Connell** (born in Ireland)
- **Eilish O'Dowd** (born in Ireland)
- **Orla O'Dwyer** (raised in Ireland)
- **Erika O'Shea** (born in Ireland)
- **Julie O'Sullivan** (born in Ireland)
- **Aisling Reidy** (born in Ireland)
- **Sarah Rowe** (born in Ireland)
- Megan Ryan (born in Ireland)
- Aishling Sheridan (born in Ireland)
- Bríd Stack (born in Ireland)
- Cora Staunton (born in Ireland)
- **Áine Tighe** (born in Ireland)
- **Vikki Wall** (born in Ireland)

=== Italy ===
- Christina Bernardi
- Steph Chiocci
- **Darcy Vescio**

=== Malta ===
- Amanda Farrugia (Maltese parents)

=== Sweden ===
- **Bianca Jakobsson**

=== United Kingdom ===
==== England ====
- **Nicola Barr**
- **Mikayla Bowen**
- **Stephanie Cain**
- McKenzie Dowrick
- **Abbey Dowrick**
- **Jade Ellenger** (born in England)
- Alicia Eva
- Sabrina Frederick (born in England)
- **Kellie Gibson**
- Brianna Green
- **Anne Hatchard**
- Dana Hooker
- Sammie Johnson
- Kate Lutkins
- Rhiannon Metcalfe
- **Hayley Miller**
- **Gabby Newton**
- Brittany Perry
- Cat Phillips (born in England)
- Selina Priest
- **Laura Pugh**
- Jess Sedunary
- **Philipa Seth**
- **Taylor Smith**
- Lisa Webb

==== Scotland ====
- Janelle Cuthbertson
- Kirsten McLeod

==== Wales ====
- **Darcie Davies** (born in Wales)
- **Fleur Davies** (born in Wales)
- **Georja Davies** (Welsh parents)
- Giselle Davies (born in Wales)
- Jess Hosking
- **Sarah Hosking**

== Oceania ==
=== Fiji ===
- Helen Roden (born in Fiji)

=== Papua New Guinea ===
- Zimmorlei Farquharson (Papua New Guinean mother)
- Alicia Janz (Papua New Guinean and Indigenous Australian mother)

=== New Zealand ===
- **Najwa Allen**
- Jacinda Barclay (born in New Zealand)
- Grace Brooker (born in New Zealand)
- Mhicca Carter (born in New Zealand)
- Richelle Cranston (New Zealand parents)
- **Abbey Dowrick**
- McKenzie Dowrick
- Sabreena Duffy
- **Jasmine Garner**
- Serena Gibbs
- Dee Heslop (born in New Zealand)
- Moana Hope (New Zealand parents)
- **Poppy Kelly**
- **Mua Laloifi** (raised in New Zealand)
- Rheanne Lugg
- **Celine Moody** (New Zealand mother)
- **Breann Moody** (New Zealand mother)
- Rebecca Ott (New Zealand parents)
- **Lauren Pearce**
- **Tahlia Randall** (New Zealand mother)
- **Lucy Single** (New Zealand father)
- Ange Stannett (born in New Zealand)
- Kristy Stratton
- **Indy Tahau** (New Zealand parents)
- **Jesse Tawhiao-Wardlaw**
- Stevie-Lee Thompson (raised in New Zealand)
- Makaela Tuhakaraina (New Zealand father)
- **Brooke Walker**

=== Samoa ===
- **Mua Laloifi** (born in Samoa)

== See also ==
- List of AFL Women's players born outside Australia
- List of VFL/AFL players with international backgrounds
- List of Australian Football League players born outside Australia
