= List of AFL Women's players born outside Australia =

This is a list of players who have played at least one senior game in the AFL Women's (AFLW), who were born outside Australia.

== Players born outside Australia ==
^	Denotes current player

Statistics are correct to the end of the 2025 AFL Women's season

Name	Country of birth	Club(s)	Career span	Games	Goals
Muireann Atkinson	Ireland	Collingwood	2024–2025	16	0
Jacinda Barclay	New Zealand	Greater Western Sydney	2017–2020	23	11
Bláithín Bogue^	Northern Ireland	North Melbourne	2025–	15	25
Yvonne Bonner	Ireland	Adelaide, Greater Western Sydney	2019–2020; 2023	21	13
Amy Boyle-Carr^	Ireland	Adelaide	2024–	6	0
Ellie Brady^	Ireland	Collingwood	2026–	0	0
Grace Brooker	New Zealand	Essendon	2025	5	2
Mhicca Carter	New Zealand	West Coast	2020	1	0
Aoibhin Cleary^	Ireland	Richmond	2025–	2	0
Ailish Considine	Ireland	Adelaide, North Melbourne	2019–2023	27	9
Joanne Cregg	Ireland	Fremantle	2023–2025	16	0
Kayleigh Cronin^	Ireland	Adelaide	2025–	6	0
Darcie Davies^	Wales	Gold Coast	2023–	42	13
Fleur Davies^	Wales	Greater Western Sydney	2023–	21	2
Giselle Davies	Wales	Gold Coast, Sydney	2022 (S6)–2025	19	2
Neasa Dooley^	Ireland	Brisbane	2025–	14	10
Joanne Doonan	Northern Ireland	Carlton, Essendon	2020; 2022 (S7)–2023	13	2
Jennifer Dunne^	Ireland	Brisbane	2023–	79	10
Laura Duryea	Ireland	Melbourne	2017–2018	11	0
Jade Ellenger^	England	Brisbane	2019–	50	6
Emmelie Fiedler^	Germany	St Kilda	2024–	6	0
Dayna Finn^	Ireland	Carlton	2023–	30	11
Clara Fitzpatrick^	Northern Ireland	Gold Coast, St Kilda	2020–2021; 2022 (S7)–	38	1
Erone Fitzpatrick^	Ireland	Carlton	2023–	25	19
Kate Flood	Ireland	Fremantle	2019–2020	7	5
Sabrina Frederick	England	Brisbane, Collingwood, Richmond	2017–2026	92	24
Amy Gavin Mangan^	Ireland	North Melbourne	2025–	7	3
Aileen Gilroy	Ireland	Hawthorn, North Melbourne	2020–2025	70	23
Sinéad Goldrick^	Ireland	Melbourne	2020–	61	3
Elaine Grigg^	Kenya	Western Bulldogs	2024–	23	8
Aoife Healy^	Ireland	Fremantle	2026–	0	0
Katy Herron	Ireland	Western Bulldogs	2020	6	0
Dee Heslop	New Zealand	Brisbane, Gold Coast	2020–2025	45	0
Kellyann Hogan^	Ireland	Collingwood	2025–	4	0
Aoife Horisk^	Ireland	Melbourne	2026–	0	0
Rhianna Ingram^	Northern Ireland	Gold Coast	2026–	0	0
Rachel Kearns^	Ireland	Geelong	2022 (S6)–	46	6
Grace Kelly^	Ireland	Adelaide, St Kilda, West Coast	2020–	57	16
Niamh Kelly^	Ireland	Adelaide, West Coast	2020–	70	20
Anna-Rose Kennedy	Ireland	Geelong	2023–2024	12	0
Tanya Kennedy^	Ireland	Sydney	2023–	35	4
Kate Kenny^	Ireland	Geelong	2024–	19	6
Orlagh Lally^	Ireland	Fremantle	2022 (S7)–	37	10
Saoirse Lally^	Ireland	St Kilda	2026–	0	0
Mua Laloifi^	Samoa	Carlton, Western Bulldogs	2020–	49	1
Amanda Ling	Malaysia	Western Bulldogs	2022 (S6)	2	0
Aimee Mackin^	Northern Ireland	Melbourne	2023–	6	2
Blaithin Mackin^	Northern Ireland	Melbourne	2022 (S7)–	36	7
Akec Makur Chuot	Sudan (now South Sudan)	Fremantle, Hawthorn, Richmond	2017–2023	40	2
Lauren Magee	Ireland	Melbourne	2021–2022 (S6)	11	0
Danielle Marshall	United States	Essendon, Western Bulldogs	2020–2023	23	4
Niamh Martin^	Ireland	Hawthorn, North Melbourne	2023–	16	8
Aisling McCarthy^	Ireland	Fremantle, West Coast, Western Bulldogs	2019–	67	33
Cara McCrossan	Northern Ireland	Gold Coast	2023–2024	6	0
Lauren McConville	Northern Ireland	Gold Coast	2024	3	0
Áine McDonagh^	Ireland	Hawthorn	2022 (S7)–	44	52
Niamh McEvoy	Ireland	Melbourne	2020–2021	8	1
Niamh McLaughlin^	Ireland	Gold Coast	2023–	33	6
Aishling Moloney^	Ireland	Geelong	2023–	36	48
Amy Mulholland	Northern Ireland	Fremantle	2022 (S7)–2025	33	3
Ana Mulholland^	Northern Ireland	Richmond	2026–	0	0
Emma Murray^	Ireland	Geelong	2026–	0	0
Siofra O'Connell^	Ireland	Carlton	2025–	6	0
Eilish O'Dowd^	Ireland	Greater Western Sydney	2024–	23	9
Erika O'Shea^	Ireland	North Melbourne	2022 (S7)–	50	1
Julie O'Sullivan^	Ireland	Sydney	2023–	24	1
Cat Phillips	England	Essendon, Melbourne, St Kilda	2017–2023	54	10
Aisling Reidy^	Ireland	Carlton	2025–	4	1
Helen Roden	Fiji	Collingwood	2017	1	0
Sarah Rowe^	Ireland	Collingwood	2019–	75	13
Megan Ryan	Ireland	Essendon	2022 (S7)	2	0
Aishling Sheridan	Ireland	Collingwood	2020–2024	47	15
Bríd Stack	Ireland	Greater Western Sydney	2022 (S6)–2022 (S7)	19	1
Ange Stannett^	New Zealand	Fremantle	2019–	69	11
Cora Staunton	Ireland	Greater Western Sydney	2018–2022 (S7)	50	55
Jesse Tawhiao-Wardlaw^	New Zealand	Brisbane, St Kilda	2019–	83	83
Áine Tighe^	Ireland	Fremantle	2019–	34	29
Vikki Wall^	Ireland	North Melbourne	2022 (S7)–	39	25
Brooke Walker^	New Zealand	Carlton, Essendon	2019–	53	18

== See also ==
- List of AFL Women's players with international backgrounds
- Australian rules football around the world
