= Irish experiment =

Importation of Gaelic footballers

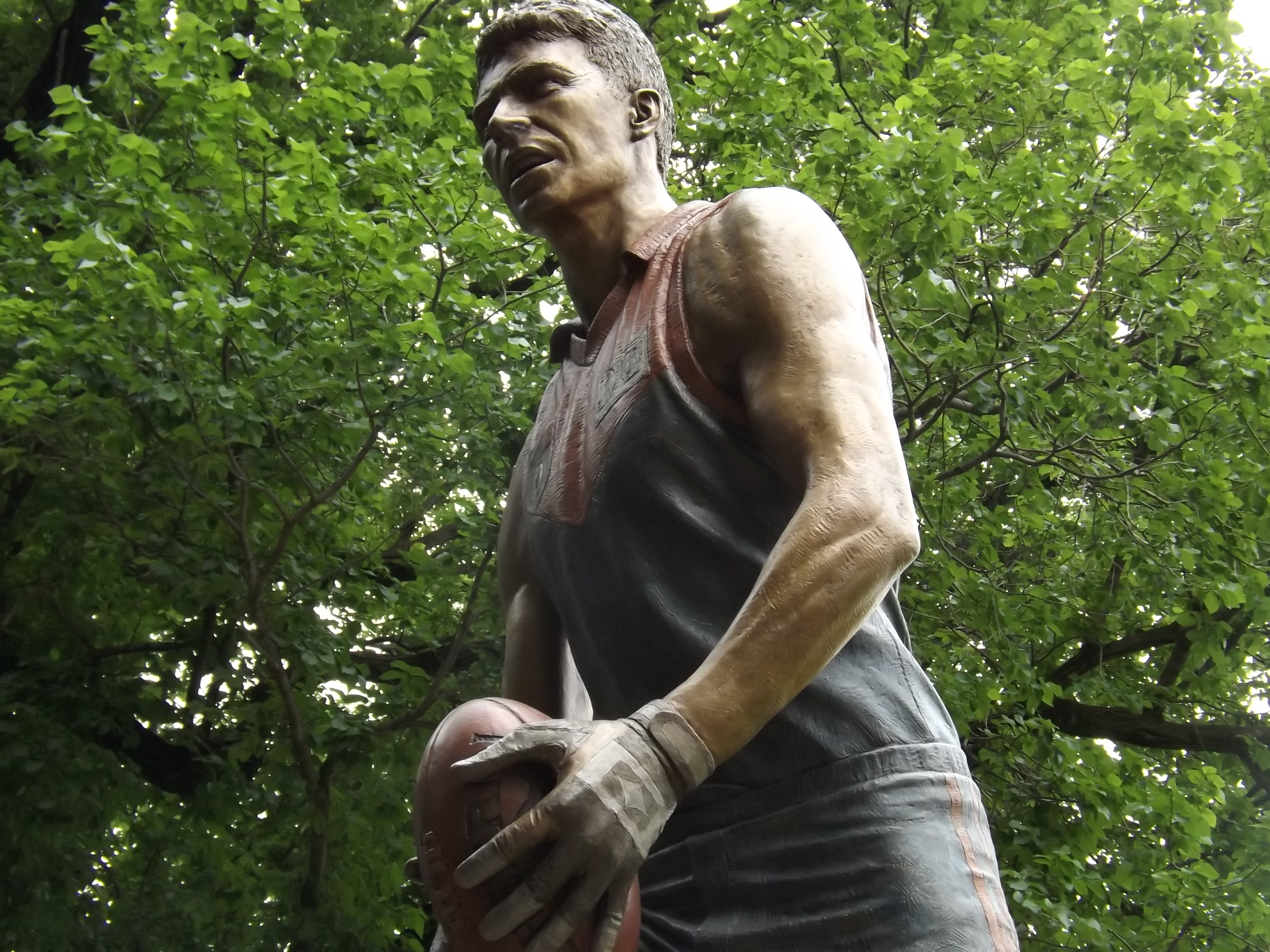
A statue of Jim Stynes at the Melbourne Cricket Ground. The first Irish-born player to win the prestigious Brownlow Medal, Stynes is among the most successful recruits from the Irish experiment.

The Irish experiment is the popular term for the recruitment of Irish athletes, mainly Gaelic footballers, by VFL/AFL clubs to play Australian rules football professionally in Australia. The AFL's focus on Gaelic footballers stems from similarities between the sports.

The Irish experiment began in the mid-1980s as an informal project by the Melbourne Football Club. Although it saw early success, enthusiasm for the project lapsed until the 2000s as part of a more sustained recruitment effort that includes the AFL European Combine, held annually in Dublin.

The Irish experiment has attracted media and public interest in both Ireland and Australia. Over 60 sportsmen have been recruited through the Irish experiment, with 16 on team lists for the 2025 AFL season. The highest-profile product of the Irish experiment to date is arguably Jim Stynes, an early recruit in 1984, who went on to receive the Medal of the Order of Australia and win the 1991 Brownlow Medal. Other stand-out players include Tadhg Kennelly, the first Irishman to play in and win a premiership; and Zach Tuohy, who holds the record for most VFL/AFL games played by an Irish recruit, with 288 games.

Irish women have become a significant source of talent in the professional AFL Women's (AFLW) competition, with 39 Irish players participating in the 2025 season. Several have achieved notable accolades, including Ailish Considine, the first Irish premiership player; Orla O'Dwyer, the first Irish All-Australian; and Cora Staunton, a leading goalkicker.

== History ==
One of the first gaelic footballers to convert to Australian rules was Eugene King, who arrived in Australia in 1956 and was invited to train with the Footscray Football Club however he had difficulty with the shape of the ball and did not make the grade.

=== Australian Football World Tour ===
In 1967, Harry Beitzel drew inspiration from watching the 1966 All-Ireland Senior Football Championship final on television and formed an Australian side, nicknamed "The Galahs", to play the game against an Irish side. The next year he organised The Australian Football World Tour, a six-match series with games played against Irish teams in Ireland, the United Kingdom and United States of America. What followed was the beginning of regular interaction between the two codes which was to become the hybrid code of International Rules Football.

=== Beginnings of the Irish experiment ===
Ron Barassi, drawing comparisons between Australian rules football and Gaelic football was of the opinion that Gaelic Footballers could provide a previously untapped pool of potential Australian Rules players. At the time, Australian Rules was, with the introduction of the Sydney Swans, increasing its national focus and emerging from a semi-professional sport to a fully professional one. As a result, wealthy Victorian clubs were scouting the country far and wide for new talent to gain an advantage in the sport's premier competition. In 1982, Barassi (then the Melbourne VFL club coach) and his recruiting team (including Melbourne's Barry Richardson) travelled to Ireland, looking for young, tall, and talented players.

The first recruit was Sean Wight. Wight was part of an Under-19 VFL premiership side just weeks after his arrival from Ireland in 1983 and was widely hailed for his rapid conversion, though others who joined him had much less success. Further advertising resulted in the recruitment of a "tall, skinny lad", Jim Stynes. Both Wight and Stynes, still very much learning the game, played together in the club's 1987 night premiership. While Stynes captured the Melbourne reserves best and fairest that year, he also involved in an embarrassing event which cast doubts on the Irish experiment. His lack of understanding of the rules arguably cost Melbourne a berth in the 1987 VFL Grand Final. The infamous Preliminary Final incident in which he ran over the mark before the siren made him and the Irish experiment the focus of Melbourne media. The mistake awarded Hawthorn's Gary Buckenara a 15-metre penalty which resulted in a winning goal to qualify for the Grand Final. Despite the setback, Stynes and Wight were both to improve in the following seasons and become regular senior players.

Wight and Stynes both featured in the 1988 VFL Grand Final. However, despite high expectations, Melbourne was convincingly thrashed by Hawthorn, then the dominant club of the era. However, Stynes was voted best on field for the Demons.

At the end of the 1988 season, Victoria Football Association (VFA) club Prahran enticed Dermot McNicholl, who had starred in two previous International rules series, to move to Melbourne. Two weeks later, St Kilda drafted him with the 99th selection in the 1988 VFL draft. In the same draft, Melbourne recruited two more Irish players, Jim Stynes' brother Brian and Tom Grehan. McNicholl spent the 1989 season playing for Prahran, before injury forced him to miss the first half of the 1990 season, after which he recovered and made his senior debut for St Kilda. He played three senior games before returning to Ireland to complete his university studies.

A much-improved Jim Stynes won the Brownlow Medal in 1991, cementing his place as a future Melbourne and AFL Hall of Famer. However, the rare successes were increasingly seen as "one-offs", and other clubs showed little enthusiasm with the "hit-and-miss" strategy. Melbourne, the trailblazer club, was not translating recruitment into on-field success and was fast losing financial resources that were required to sustain international recruitment. As a result, only a few AFL clubs recruited Gaelic footballers who played at the highest level in the 1990s. It was later Stynes' post-playing career as Melbourne president that helped the club eliminate A$5 million in debt in two years, leaving the club A$400,000 in surplus. The Demons had been in debt for thirty years.

Despite the Melbourne Football Club's enthusiasm for the Irish experiment and early success with some Irish players, the majority of players from the Irish Experiment did not fare as well. Most failed to meet expectations, not make VFL level, and many instead returned home to Ireland. Even the recruitment of Jim Stynes' brother Brian yielded just a handful of unimpressive senior games, and McNicholl returned home after only 3 matches.

With the increasing professionalism of the AFL competition, some clubs continued to speculate about the overseas talent pool. Kevin Sheedy in particular conducted a series of his own experiments with overseas players from various sporting backgrounds but did not include Ireland or Gaelic football. Despite generating media publicity, none of these experiments were ultimately successful, and increasingly sections of the Australian media began to mock the idea of international recruitment.

=== 2000s revival ===
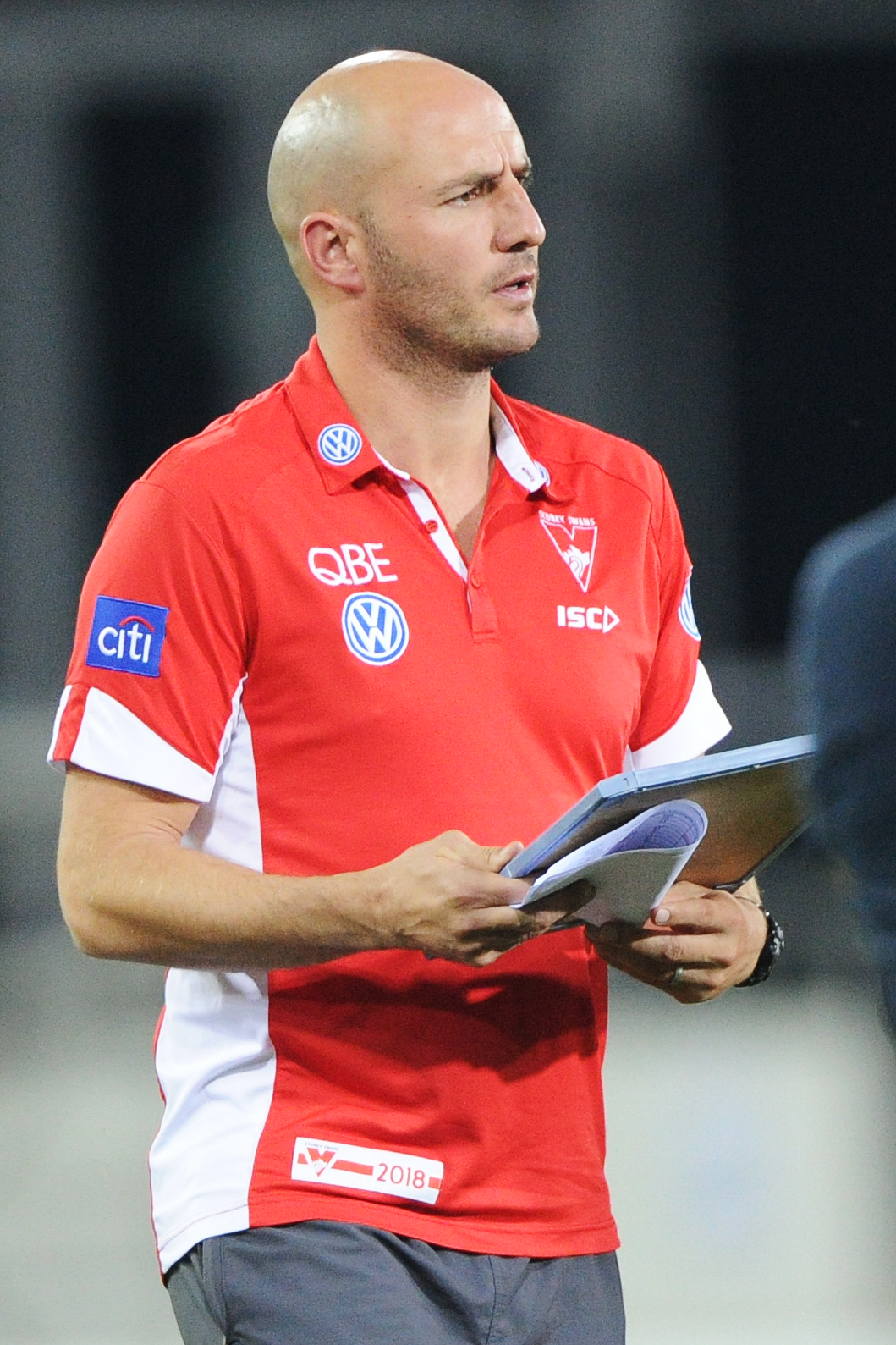
Tadhg Kennelly became the first Irish AFL premiership player in 2005 and represented Ireland 6 times.

The Irish experiment lay dormant for many years until Melbourne once again began to take an interest in it. The Sydney Swans followed with the recruitment of Tadhg Kennelly through its rookie list. Kennelly was an almost overnight success, being nominated for the AFL Rising Star award in his first season and widely hailed by the media. As a result, other clubs began to show a much keener interest in Irish talent.

With access to additional resources, AFL clubs began to spend more time and effort in identifying and training athletic and talented rookies. Collingwood, Carlton and Brisbane in particular began to show an interest and held scouting sessions and tryouts for Irish players.

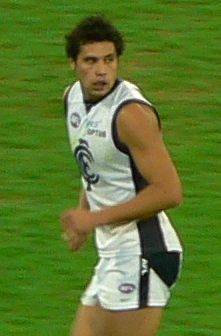
Setanta Ó hAilpín went against the Gaelic Football trend and made a successful conversion from hurling.

Carlton soon followed, and its experiments with Setanta and Aisake Ó hAilpín began to bear fruit and attract significant media interest in both Australia and Ireland. These experiments were of particular note, as for the first time a club was looking to other sports than Gaelic football, by identifying talented hurling athletes with the right ingredients to become AFL players.

With Gaelic footballer Colm Begley's rapid conversion at Brisbane and Martin Clarke's successful AFL debut, media commentators hailed a new era for the Irish experiment. During the 2007 AFL season, several AFL clubs began sending talent scouts to Ireland.

In March 2008, it was revealed by the media that the AFL had considered a radical proposal to launch an Irish-dominated team in Sydney's western suburbs, which would perform before an international audience under the Celtic brand name. The "Sydney Celtics" plan was first put to AFL chief executive Andrew Demetriou in early 2007 by Gaelic Players Association executive Donal O'Neill. It was said that the proposal originated at the International Rules Series in Ireland in late 2006, where O'Neill put forward a plan to purchase an AFL licence in Sydney. However, the AFL later dismissed it as simple speculation.

By mid-2008, the interest of clubs reached a peak, and Tadhg Kennelly and Jim Stynes spoke out about the increasing recruitment activity. AFL player manager Ricky Nixon set up recruitment networks in Ireland to complement those already in place by clubs such as Collingwood, Carlton and Brisbane. Nickey Brennan, the GAA boss, spoke out against the recruitment activity in June 2008. The AFL and GAA had ongoing discussions about putting limits on the recruitment of players.

Despite the rise of former hurler Setanta Ó hAilpín in the AFL, recruitment interest in Ireland began to wane in mid-2010. Several Irish players cancelled their rookie contracts to return home; others were delisted after brief bouts in the various state leagues.

=== 2010–2015: AFL turns to other sources of talent ===
With a media circus surrounding the conversion of professional Australian rugby league players Karmichael Hunt to the Gold Coast Football Club and Israel Folau to the Greater Western Sydney Giants, focus began to shift to other sports, particularly rugby football as a potential source of talent. With the success of Canadian rugby union player Mike Pyke's conversion and many other players transitioning at the junior level, the AFL and commentators began to speculate that professional rugby league players might make an easier transition to the AFL due to coming from a heavy-contact professional sport involving an oval ball. The transition of two highly publicised rugby league players has since proved to be of little success, and the cross-code focus of AFL recruiters has returned to the GAA and expanded to include American professional sportsmen.

In particular, the first AFL International Combine was held in the United States targeting college basketballers and college footballers was particularly successful, eventually producing such AFL-listed Americans as Eric Wallace, Jason Holmes and Mason Cox.

=== 2015–2020: Revival and European Combine ===
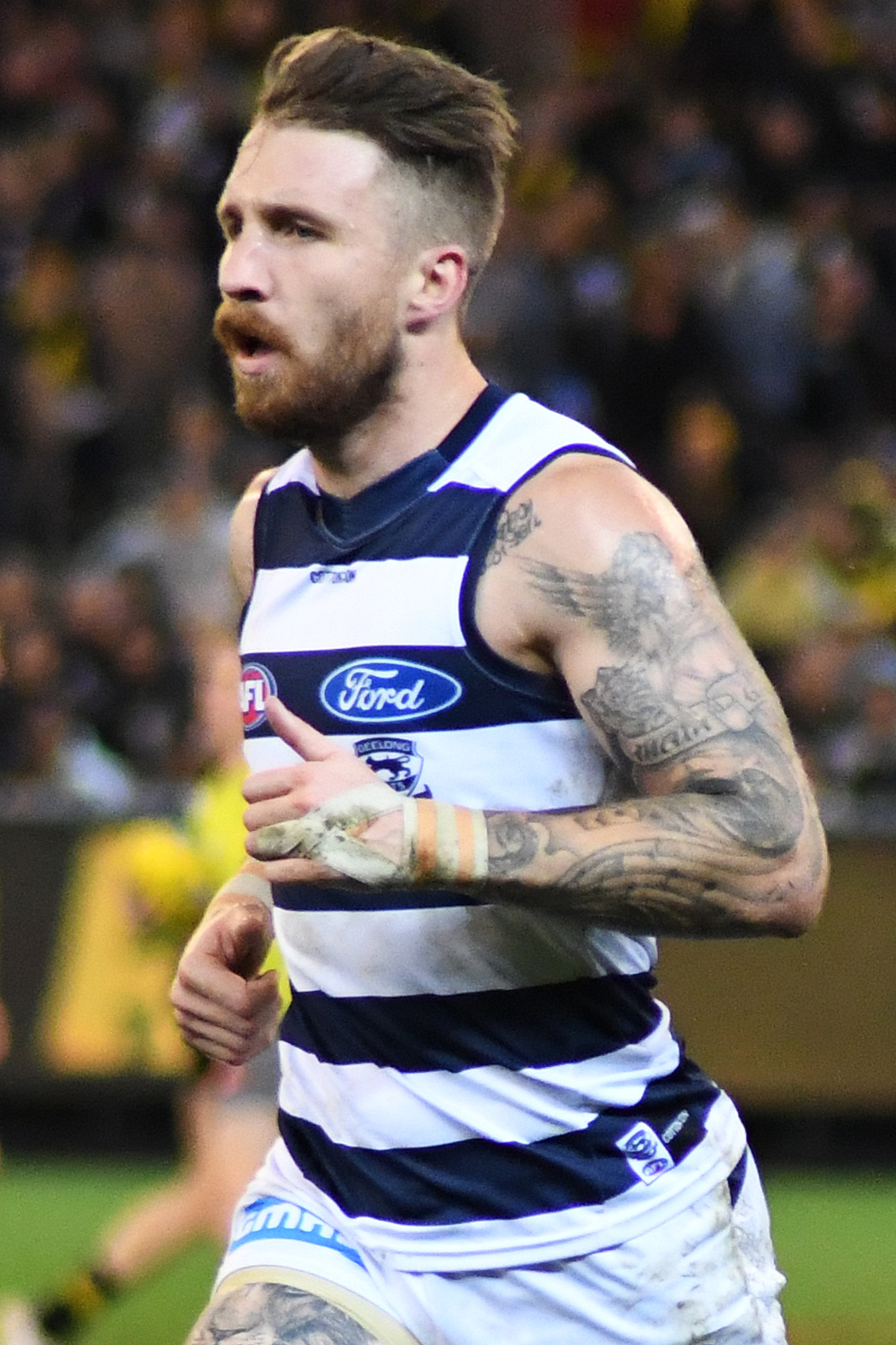
Zach Tuohy holds the record for most AFL games by an Irishman with 288. He won an AFL premiership and represented Ireland 4 times.

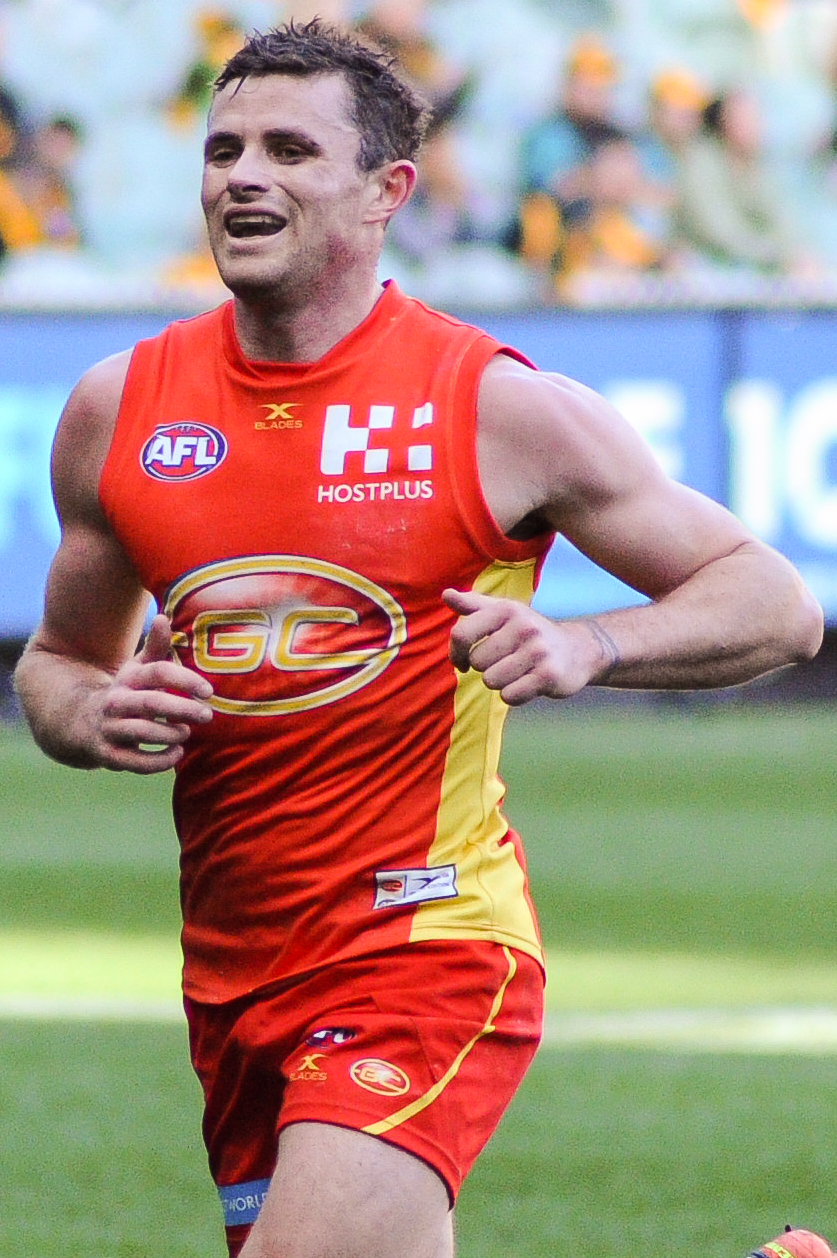
Pearce Hanley played 169 AFL games and represented Ireland twice.

In 2015, the AFL appointed Tadhg Kennelly, a former player for the Sydney Swans, as its International Talent Manager; and, in addition to the US Combine, Kennelly organised a special European Combine to be held in Dublin. As expected, the large proportion of the turn-out were Gaelic footballers. The two best-performing participants at the combine are then given the opportunity to attend the AFL National Combine. Sean Hurley, Paddy Brophy, Daniel Flynn, Ciarán Byrne, Ciarán Sheehan and Cian Hanley are some notable people who have previously attended the combine.

In 2018, the Irish contingent in the AFL consisted of five senior-listed players and six rookie-listed players.

The 2020 AFL Grand Final featured two players: Zach Tuohy and Mark O'Connor. Both were playing for Geelong but the team lost the game to Richmond.

=== Damage inflicted by the 2020 Conor McKenna coverage ===
On 20 June 2020, Conor McKenna of Essendon tested positive for the highly infectious novel coronavirus disease COVID-19. This resulted in the postponement of the match scheduled for the following day between Essendon and Melbourne. One other player was quarantined due to close contact during training. McKenna had another COVID-19 test on 22 June which was confirmed as negative in the evening of 23 June. He remained in quarantine pending a further test later in the week. During this time McKenna was subjected to an intense trial by media, abuse on social media and became a public villain in the country, treatment which provoked much criticism. On 8 September 2020, McKenna announced his retirement and return to Ireland after 79 games played. Geelong footballer Zach Tuohy described the official and media abuse directed at McKenna as "disgraceful" and "outrageous". In Ireland, it was also suggested "stars of the future that may being [sic] tempted to pursue a life in the AFL Down Under, may reconsider". McKenna returned to Australia in 2023 and resumed his AFL career, signing with the Brisbane Lions.

== List of Irish sportsmen linked with the VFL/AFL ==
This list includes any player who at minimum (regardless of whether he ever went to Australia or played actual VFL/AFL matches) meets any one of the following criteria:

a) brought to Australia by an AFL club
b) spent time training with an AFL club
c) played in an AFL club's affiliated state league club or AFL practice match
d) offered an AFL contract by a club
e) listed on an AFL rookie or senior list

=== Notable players ===
The following players from the Irish experiment have either played a VFL/AFL game, or are currently on an AFL list.

*	The first Irish experiment player associated with that club
†	Currently on an AFL senior list
‡	Currently on an AFL rookie list

Year linked with AFL	Player	GAA	Initial VFL/AFL club	Draft status	VFL/AFL debut	VFL/AFL matches	Notes
1982	Sean Wight	Kerry	Melbourne*	Rookie	1985	150	Melbourne's first Irish recruit. Had a serviceable career at Melbourne.
1983	Paul Earley	Roscommon	Melbourne		1984	1	Returned to Ireland.
1984	Jim Stynes	Dublin	Melbourne	Rookie	1987	264	Won the All-Ireland Minor Football Championship with Dublin before joining Melbourne and winning the Brownlow Medal in 1991. Inducted into the Australian Football Hall of Fame in 2003. Long held the AFL record for consecutive games played. The Jim Stynes Medal, the Australian Player of the Series award in the International Rules Series, is named after him. He was honored with a state funeral in Melbourne when he died in 2012.
1987	Dermot McNicholl	Derry	St Kilda*	1988 National draft (Pick 99)	1990	3	St Kilda's first Irish player returned to Ireland in 1990 because his university refused to let him defer his course any longer.
1990	Brian Stynes	Dublin	Melbourne	Rookie	1992	2	Younger brother of Jim Stynes.
1999	Tadhg Kennelly	Kerry	Sydney*	1999 AFL draft (rookie)	2001	197	Sydney's first Irish player was also the first to win an AFL premiership medallion (in 2005 – the Swans' first Premiership in 72 years) and his much-celebrated AFL career led to renewed interest in Irish recruitment. Took a sabbatical from AFL in a bid to win the 2009 All-Ireland Senior Football Championship Final with Kerry (his father Tim had won five All-Irelands with Kerry), which he did before returning to Australia and rejoining the Swans in 2010. Also won the 2011 GAA Medal for being Irish Player of the Series in the International Rules Series. He is the first player to have won both the All-Ireland Senior Football Final and the AFL Grand Final.
2004	Setanta Ó hAilpín	Cork	Carlton	2004 rookie draft	2005	88	Better known as a hurler Shifted to Greater Western Sydney in 2012.
2006	Colm Begley	Laois	Brisbane	2006 AFL draft (rookie)	2006	30	Brisbane's first Irish player made a rapid conversion which stunned the Australian media. Played his first AFL game just weeks after his arrival in Australia, however was eventually delisted by Brisbane but given a second chance by St Kilda Decided to return to Ireland after the 2009 AFL season and was delisted.
2006	Martin Clarke	Down	Collingwood	2006 rookie draft	2007	73	Clarke was Collingwood's first Irish recruit, and was very successful upon debut in 2007. He returned to play Gaelic football for Down in 2010, and returned to play Australian football for Collingwood in 2012.
2007	Pearce Hanley	Mayo	Brisbane	2007 rookie draft	2008	169	Promoted to Brisbane's senior list for 2010. Joined Gold Coast for the 2017 season.
2008	Michael Quinn	Longford	Essendon*	2008 AFL draft (rookie)	2009	8	Essendon's first Irish AFL player Played in the 2009 NAB Cup and debuted in Round 2, 2009 for Essendon. On debut took the record from Martin Clarke for the quickest time to convert between codes.
2008	Zach Tuohy	Laois	Carlton	2009 AFL draft (rookie)	2011	288	Made his senior debut in 2011. Has enjoyed as successful career including a premiership in 2022.
2008	Niall McKeever	Antrim	Brisbane	2009 AFL draft (rookie)	2011	22	Trained with Richmond's senior squad in Melbourne. Was also linked to North Melbourne before signing a rookie contract with the Brisbane Lions.
2008	Tommy Walsh	Kerry	St Kilda	2009 AFL draft (rookie)	2012	5	A high-profile talent and who after several offers accepted an invitation to train with St Kilda in Melbourne but withdrew, leaving open the possibility of a future contract with an AFL club. Finally agreed to sign for St Kilda in 2009 but didn't play a game. In 2012 he signed with Sydney. In 2014, he decided to return to Ireland.
2009	Jamie O'Reilly	Down	Richmond*	2009 AFL draft (rookie)	2010	4	Richmond's first Irish signing. Delisted in 2011
2011	Caolan Mooney	Down	Collingwood*	2012 Rookie draft	2012	6	
2013	Ciarán Sheehan	Cork	Carlton*	2014 Rookie draft	2013	6	The second player to have played for both GAA and AFL teams to win the GAA Medal as Irish Player of the Series in the International Rules Series (2013). Delisted at the end of the 2017 season.
2013	Ciarán Byrne	Louth	Carlton*	2014 Rookie draft	2014	22	Left at the end of the 2018 season to return to Ireland.
2014	Conor McKenna ‡	Tyrone	Essendon*	International rookie	2015	128	Left following negative media coverage of his COVID-19 diagnosis, a test which could not be replicated two days later. McKenna immediately resumed his Gaelic football career with Tyrone. He would go on to win the All-Ireland Senior Football Championship for Tyrone in 2021 before coming back to Australia to play for the Brisbane Lions in 2023 which lead to him being a part of Brisbane's winning Grand Final team in 2024, becoming only the second player to win both an All-Ireland Senior Football Championship and an AFL premiership after Tadhg Kennelly.
2015	Conor Glass	Derry	Hawthorn*	International rookie	2017	21	First Irishman to play for Hawthorn. Announced decision to depart in September 2020. Resumed his Gaelic football career.
2015	Colin O'Riordan*	Tipperary	Sydney	International rookie	2018	34	
2016	Mark O'Connor †	Kerry	Geelong	International rookie	2017	144	Became the second player alongside Zach Tuohy to win an AFL premiership in 2022.
2016	Conor Nash †	Meath	Hawthorn	International rookie	2018	117	Rugby union convert (represented Ireland in junior rugby union)
2016	Darragh Joyce ‡	Kilkenny	St Kilda	International rookie	2018	24	Former hurler
2018	James Madden †	Dublin	Brisbane	International rookie	2021	13	
2018	Mark Keane †	Cork	Collingwood	International rookie	2019	54	Declared homesickness as a reason to terminate contract and remain in Ireland. Returned to the AFL signing with Adelaide prior to the 2023 AFL season.
2018	Anton Tohill	Derry	Collingwood	International rookie	2019	1	Turned down a one-year extension in 2021 and returned to Ireland to pursue a medical degree
2018	Callum Brown †	Derry	Greater Western Sydney	International rookie	2021	63	
2021	Oisín Mullin ‡	Mayo	Geelong	International rookie	2023	40	
2023	Matt Duffy ‡	Dromard	Carlton	International rookie	–	–	Ruptured anterior cruciate ligament after signing with Carlton. Expected to be in Australia for the 2025 AFL season.
2023	Rob Monahan ‡	Kerry	Carlton	International rookie	–	–	
2023	Liam O'Connell ‡	Cork	St Kilda	International rookie	2025	7	
2024	Karl Gallagher ‡	Monaghan	Adelaide	International rookie	–	–	
2025	Cillian Burke ‡	Kerry	Geelong	International rookie	–	–	
2025	Eamonn Armstrong ‡	Meath	St Kilda	International rookie	–	–	
2025	Kobe McDonald ‡	Mayo	St Kilda	International rookie	–	–	
2025	Ben Murphy ‡	Kerry	Brisbane Lions	International rookie	–	–	

=== Other ===
The following players have been connected with a VFL/AFL club, but never played a senior game.

Year linked with AFL	Player	GAA	Initial VFL/AFL club	Notes	Ref.
1956	Eugene King		Footscray		
1983	Glenn Earley		Melbourne	Was not successful. Returned to Ireland.	
1985	James Fahy	Dublin	Melbourne		
1988	Tom Grehan	Roscommon	Melbourne		
1989	Niall Buckley	Kildare	Melbourne		
1989	Colin Corkery	Cork	Carlton*		
1989	Colm McManamon	Mayo	Geelong*		
1990	Anthony Tohill	Derry	Melbourne	Broke his leg playing Aussie Rules and returned to Ireland in 1991.	
2001	Kevin Devine	Dublin	Melbourne		
2001	Bernie Collins	Cork	Western Bulldogs		
2002	Nicholas Walsh	Cavan	Melbourne		
2002	Declan O'Mahoney	Dublin	Sydney		
2004	Aisake Ó hAilpín	Cork	Carlton	Brother of Setanta, and better known as a hurler. He returned to Ireland in 2009, then returned to Melbourne in 2011, where he played suburban club football.	
2005	Seán Cavanagh	Tyrone	Brisbane		
2005	Brendan Quigley	Laois	Brisbane		
2006	Cathal Corr		St Kilda	Played for Coburg Tigers in the VFL.	
2007	Brendan Murphy	Carlow	Sydney	Decided to return to Ireland after injuries hindered his attempt to adapt to the new code.	
2007	Kevin Dyas	Armagh	Collingwood		
2007	Michael Shields	Cork	Carlton		
2007	Conor Meredith	Laois	North Melbourne		
2008	Kyle Coney	Tyrone	Sydney		
2008	Brian Donnelly	Louth	Adelaide		
2008	Ian Ryan	Limerick	Essendon		
2008	Carl Dias	Dublin	Adelaide	Trialled in Australia by Adelaide but not offered a rookie contract	
2008	Chrissy McKaigue	Derry	Sydney	Hurler and footballer offered a rookie contract. Trialled in Australia by Sydney. Signed a rookie contract in September 2009.	
2008	James Kielt	Derry	St Kilda	Trained with both St Kilda and North Melbourne.	
2009	David Moran	Kerry	St Kilda		
2009	Ger Cafferkey	Mayo	St Kilda		
2009	Paul Cribbin	Kildare	Collingwood	Agreed to join the club in 2010	
2009	Sean O'Kennedy	Donegal	Collingwood		
2009	James McCarthy	Dublin	North Melbourne		
2009	Barry Reilly	Cavan	North Melbourne		
2010	Paul Cribbin	Kildare	Collingwood Football Club		
2011	John Heslin	Westmeath	Richmond	Returned home, citing homesickness as his reason to pursue a GAA career	
2012	Ciarán Kilkenny	Dublin	Hawthorn	Decided for personal reasons to remain in Ireland where he wished to pursue a career with Castleknock and Dublin.	
2014	Daniel Flynn	Kildare	Port Adelaide	Returned home citing homesickness	
2014	Padraig Lucey	Killarney	Geelong		
2014	Cian Hanley	Mayo	Brisbane Lions	Brother of Pearce Hanley	
2015	Sean Hurley	Kildare	Fremantle		
2015	Paddy Brophy	Kildare	West Coast Eagles		
2016	Ray Connellan	Westmeath	St Kilda	Delisted at the end of the 2018 season, then played half a season for Essendon in the VFL	
2017	Cillian McDaid	Galway	Carlton	Left at the end of the 2018 season to return to Ireland	
2018	Red Óg Murphy	Sligo	North Melbourne	Left at the end of the 2019 season to return to Ireland	
2018	Stefan Okunbor	Kerry	Geelong	Contract ended in 2021, returned to play for Kerry.	
2019	Luke Towey	Sligo	Gold Coast		
2019	Cian McBride	Meath	Essendon	Delisted	
2019	Ross McQuillan	Armagh	Essendon	Prevented by the COVID-19 pandemic from playing in cancelled reserve competition while there.	
2020	Deividas Uosis	Dingle	Brisbane	Rookied but not offered a senior contract, delisted 2022	
2021	Ultan Kelm	Fermanagh	Fremantle	Hip injury delayed rookie listing until 2022	
2021	Fionn O'Hara	Westmeath	Hawthorn	Learning his craft at Box Hill Hawks	

== AFLW ==
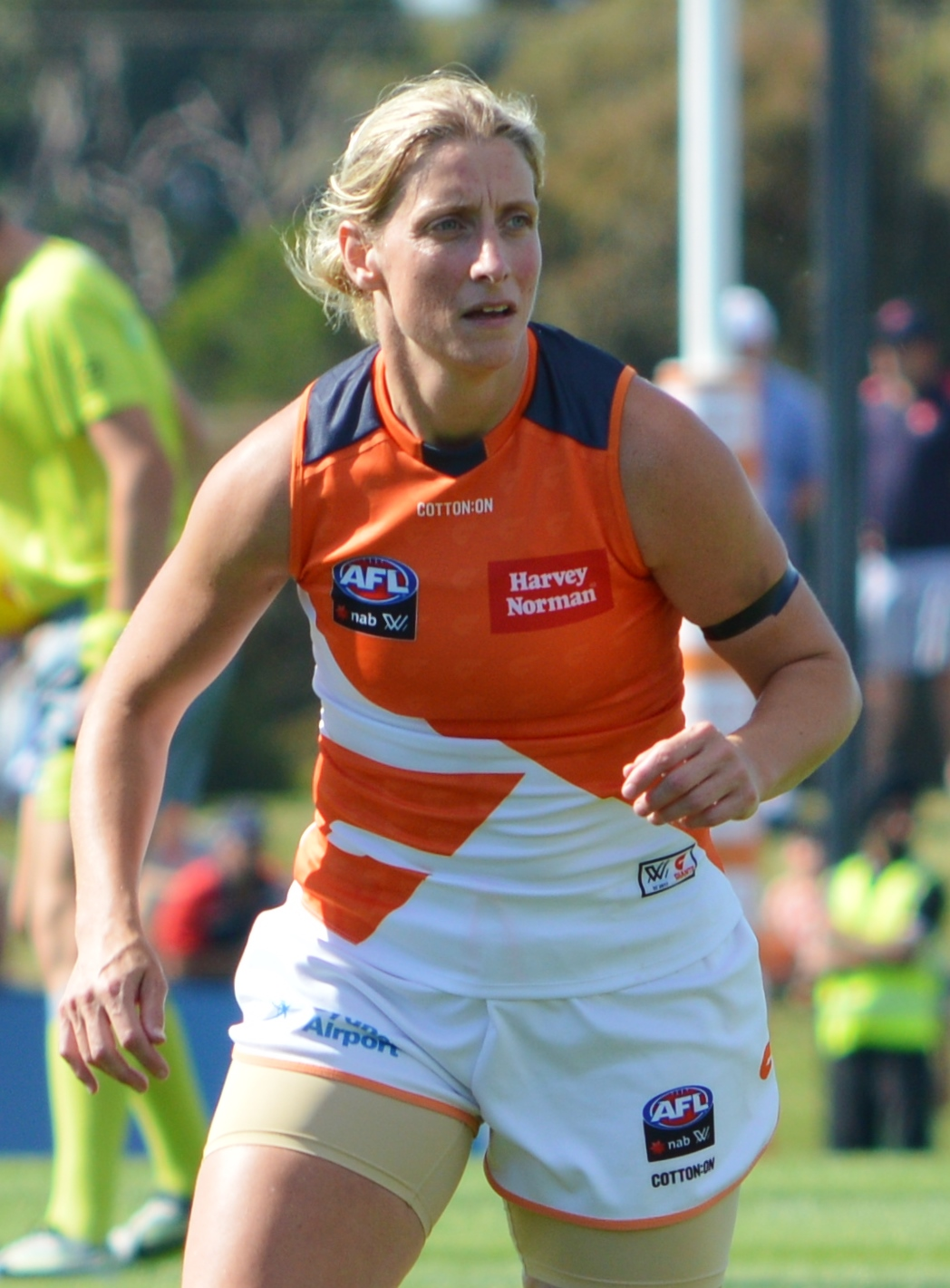
Cora Staunton playing for Greater Western Sydney in 2018. Her success in the AFLW helped inspire a wave of Irish recruits, known as "the Cora effect".

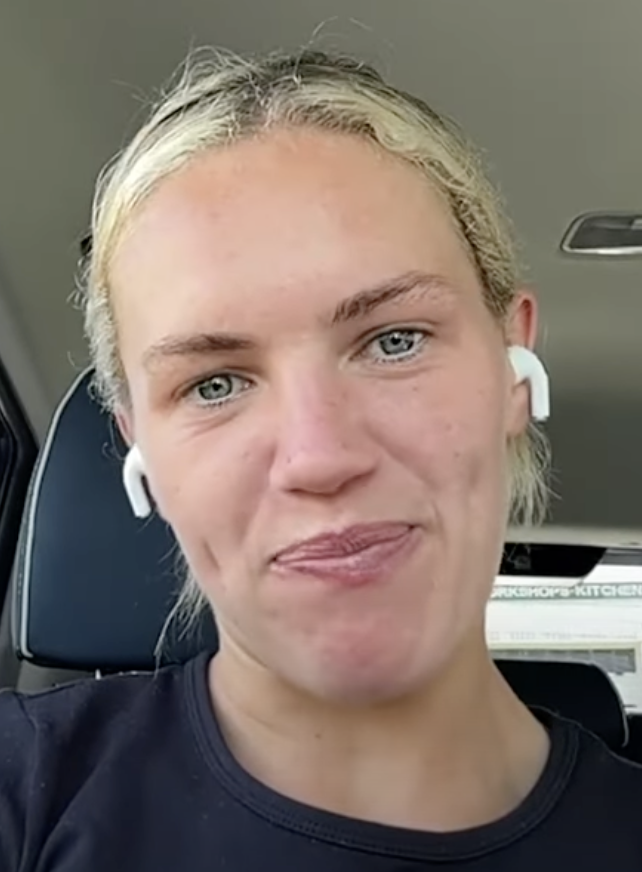
In 2022, Orla O'Dwyer became the first Irish player selected for the AFL Women's All-Australian team.

The AFL Women's (AFLW) competition was established in 2017, with Irish participation beginning immediately. Laura Duryea was drafted in the inaugural season and debuted in 2017, followed by Cora Staunton in 2018. Their involvement helped spark a sharp rise in Irish recruitment, with over 30 Irish players joining the league by the mid-2020s.

=== List of notable players ===
Year linked with AFLW	Player	GAA	Initial AFLW club	Draft status	AFLW debut	AFLW matches	Notes
2017	Laura Duryea	Cavan	Melbourne		2017	11	
2017	Cora Staunton	Mayo	Greater Western Sydney		2018	50	
2018	Yvonne Bonner	Donegal	Greater Western Sydney		2019	21	
2018	Ailish Considine	Clare	Adelaide		2019	27	
2018	Aisling McCarthy	Tipperary	Melbourne		2019	58	
2019	Joanne Doonan	Fermanagh	Carlton		2020	47	
2019	Clara Fitzpatrick	Down	St Kilda		2020	31	
2019	Kate Flood	Louth	Fremantle		2020	24	
2019	Sinéad Goldrick	Dublin	Melbourne		2020	54	
2019	Grace Kelly	Mayo	West Coast		2020	47	
2019	Niamh Kelly	Mayo	West Coast		2020	60	
2019	Niamh McEvoy	Dublin	Melbourne		2020	8	
2019	Orla O'Dwyer	Tipperary	Brisbane		2020	70	
2019	Sarah Rowe	Mayo	Collingwood		2018	66	
2019	Aishling Sheridan	Cavan	Collingwood		2020	47	
2019	Áine Tighe	Leitrim	Fremantle		2022	33	
2020	Aileen Gilroy	Mayo	North Melbourne		2020	61	
2020	Katy Herron	Donegal	Western Bulldogs		2020	6	
2020	Lauren Magee	Dublin	Melbourne		2021	24	
2021	Bríd Stack	Cork	Greater Western Sydney		2022	19	
2022	Rachel Kearns	Mayo	Geelong		2022	37	
2022	Orlagh Lally	Meath	Fremantle		2022	33	
2022	Erone Fitzpatrick	Laois	Carlton		2023	13	
2022	Aine McDonagh	Galway	Hawthorn		2022	33	
2022	Blaithin Mackin	Armagh	Melbourne		2022	31	
2022	Aishling Moloney	Tipperary	Geelong		2023	27	
2022	Amy Mulholland	Armagh	Geelong		2022	32	
2022	Erika O’Shea	Cork	North Melbourne		2022	12	
2022	Megan Ryan	Tipperary	Essendon		2022	2	
2022	Vikki Wall	Meath	North Melbourne		2022	19	
2023	Muireann Atkinson	Monaghan	Collingwood		2024	12	
2023	Joanne Cregg	Roscommon	Fremantle		2023	15	
2023	Jennifer Dunne	Dublin	Brisbane Lions		2023	28	
2023	Dayna Finn	Mayo	Carlton		2023	18	
2023	Anna-Rose Kennedy	Tipperary	Geelong		2023	12	
2023	Tanya Kennedy	Donegal	Sydney		2023	26	
2023	Aimee Mackin	Armagh	Melbourne		2023	6	
2023	Niamh Martin	Tipperary	North Melbourne		2023	16	
2023	Cara McCarthy	Kerry	Sydney		2023	14	
2023	Cara McCrossan	Tyrone	Gold Coast		2023	13	
2023	Niamh McLaughlin	Donegal	Gold Coast		2023	24	
2023	Julie O'Sullivan	Kerry	Sydney		2023	22	
2024	Bláithín Bogue	Fermanagh	North Melbourne		2024	3	
2024	Amy Boyle-Carr	Donegal	Adelaide		2024	8	
2024	Kate Kenny	Offaly Ladies	Geelong		2024	10	
2024	Lauren McConville	Armagh	Gold Coast		2024	3	
2024	Eilish O'Dowd	Dublin	Greater Western Sydney		2024	14	

== Current Irish AFLW Players ==
All Irish Players Currently Playing in the AFLW 2026

Club	Name	County
Adelaide Crows	Kayleigh Cronin	Kerry
Adelaide Crows	Grace Kelly	Mayo
Adelaide Crows	Niamh Kelly	Mayo
Adelaide Crows	Amy Boyle-Carr	Donegal
Brisbane Lions	Neasa Dooley	Kildare
Brisbane Lions	Jennifer Dunne	Dublin
Brisbane Lions	Orla O'Dwyer	Tipperary
Brisbane Lions	Caitlin Kennedy	Tipperary
Carlton	Dayna Finn	Mayo
Carlton	Aisling Reidy	Clare
Carlton	Erone Fitzpatrick	Laois
Carlton	Síofra O'Connell	Clare
Collingwood	Sarah Rowe	Mayo
Collingwood	Ellie Brady	Cavan
Collingwood	Kellyann Hogan	Waterford
Essendon	Emma Dineen	Kerry
Fremantle Dockers	Orlagh Lally	Meath
Fremantle Dockers	Aisling McCarthy	Tipperary
Fremantle Dockers	Áine Tighe	Leitrim
Fremantle Dockers	Aoife Healy	Cork
Geelong Cats	Rachel Kearns	Mayo
Geelong Cats	Aishling Moloney	Tipperary
Geelong Cats	Emma Murray	Waterford
Geelong Cats	Kate Kenny	Offaly
Gold Coast Suns	Clara Fitzpatrick	Down
Gold Coast Suns	Niamh McLaughlin	Donegal
Greater Western Sydney Giants	Grace Kos	Dublin
Greater Western Sydney Giants	Eilish O'Dowd	Leitrim
Hawthorn	Aine McDonagh	Galway
Hawthorn	Hannah Looney	Cork
Hawthorn	Niamh Martin	Tipperary
Melbourne	Sinead Goldrick	Dublin
Melbourne	Aoife Horisk	Tyrone
Melbourne	Blaithin Mackin	Armagh
North Melbourne	Vikki Wall	Meath
North Melbourne	Sarah Wall	Meath
North Melbourne	Erika O'Shea	Cork
North Melbourne	Bláithín Bogue	Fermanagh
North Melbourne	Amy Gavin Mangan	Offaly
Richmond Tigers	Aoibhin Cleary	Meath
Richmond Tigers	Ana Mulholland	Antrim
St Kilda	Saoirse Lally	Mayo
Sydney Swans	Tanya Kennedy	Donegal
Sydney Swans	Paris McCarthy	Kerry
Sydney Swans	Julie O'Sullivan	Kerry
Sydney Swans	Mary-Kate Lynch	Meath

== Current Irish AFL Players ==
Club	Name	County
Adelaide Crows	Mark Keane	Cork
Brisbane Lions	Ben Murphy	Kerry
Brisbane Lions	Darragh Joyce	Kilkenny
Brisbane Lions	Conor McKenna	Tyrone
Carlton	Rob Monahan	Kerry
Essendon	Cillian Bourke	Offaly
Geelong Cats	Mark O'Connor	Kerry
Geelong Cats	Oisín Mullin	Mayo
Geelong Cats	Cillian Burke	Kerry
Greater Western Sydney Giants	Callum Brown	Derry
Hawthorn	Conor Nash	Meath
St Kilda	Liam O'Connell	Cork
St Kilda	Kobe McDonald (2027)	Mayo
St Kilda	Eamonn Armstrong	Meath

== See also ==
- List of players who have converted from one football code to another
- Comparison of Australian rules football and Gaelic football
- Australian rules football in Ireland
