= Liam O'Connell =

Australian rules footballer

Personal information
- Born: 4 March 2003 (age 23); Ireland
- Original teams: Cork GAA, Ireland
- Draft: Rookie 2023 national draft
- Debut: 16 March 2025, St Kilda vs. Adelaide, at Adelaide Oval
- Height: 189 cm (6 ft 2 in)
- Weight: 84 kg (185 lb)
- Position: Defender

Club information
- Current club: St Kilda
- Number: 45

Playing career^{1}
Years	Club	Games (Goals)
2025–	St Kilda	20 (0)
- ^{1} Playing statistics correct to the end of 2026.

Liam O'Connell (born 4 March 2003) is a professional Australian rules footballer who plays for the St Kilda Football Club in the Australian Football League (AFL). Born in Ireland, he originally played Gaelic Football for Cork before switching to Australian rules.

== Early life ==
A native of Ballincollig, Ireland, O'Connell lived in Western Australia for several years as a child, where he became acquainted with Australian rules football. Back in Ireland by age 11, he went on to play Gaelic football for Ballincollig and Cork.

== Career ==
O'Connell was scouted by St Kilda in the Australian Football League (AFL) and selected by the club in the 2023 draft as a Category B rookie. The following year, he played 19 games for St Kilda's VFL affiliate, the Sandringham Zebras. He made his debut for the Saints in Round 1 of the 2025 AFL season, playing against Adelaide. In Round 3 against Richmond, he was concussed in an incident involving Rhyan Mansell, who was suspended for three games after being found guilty of rough conduct for forcefully pushing O'Connell into the path of an oncoming marking contest. O'Connell was cleared to return to the field for Round 6. St Kilda's Round 9 match against Carlton saw O'Connell deliver a heavy but fair bump on Mitch McGovern, who suffered a sternum injury and was taken to hospital with suspected breathing issues.

O'Connell's strong form through his debut season earned him a contract extension with St Kilda, with the club praising his rapid improvement and resilience.

== See also ==
- Irish experiment

== Statistics ==
Updated to the end of round 22, 2026.

Legend
G	Goals	K	Kicks	D	Disposals	T	Tackles
B	Behinds	H	Handballs	M	Marks

Season	Team	No.	Games	Totals							Averages (per game)							Votes
Season	Team	No.	Games	G	B	K	H	D	M	T	G	B	K	H	D	M	T	Votes
2025	St Kilda	45	7	0	0	26	17	43	16	23	0.0	0.0	3.7	2.4	6.1	2.3	3.3	0
2026	St Kilda	45	11	0	2	60	58	118	34	29	0.0	0.2	5.5	5.3	10.7	3.1	2.6	0
Career			18	0	2	86	75	161	50	52	0.0	0.1	4.8	4.2	8.9	2.8	2.9	0
