= Jade Ellenger =

Australian rules footballer

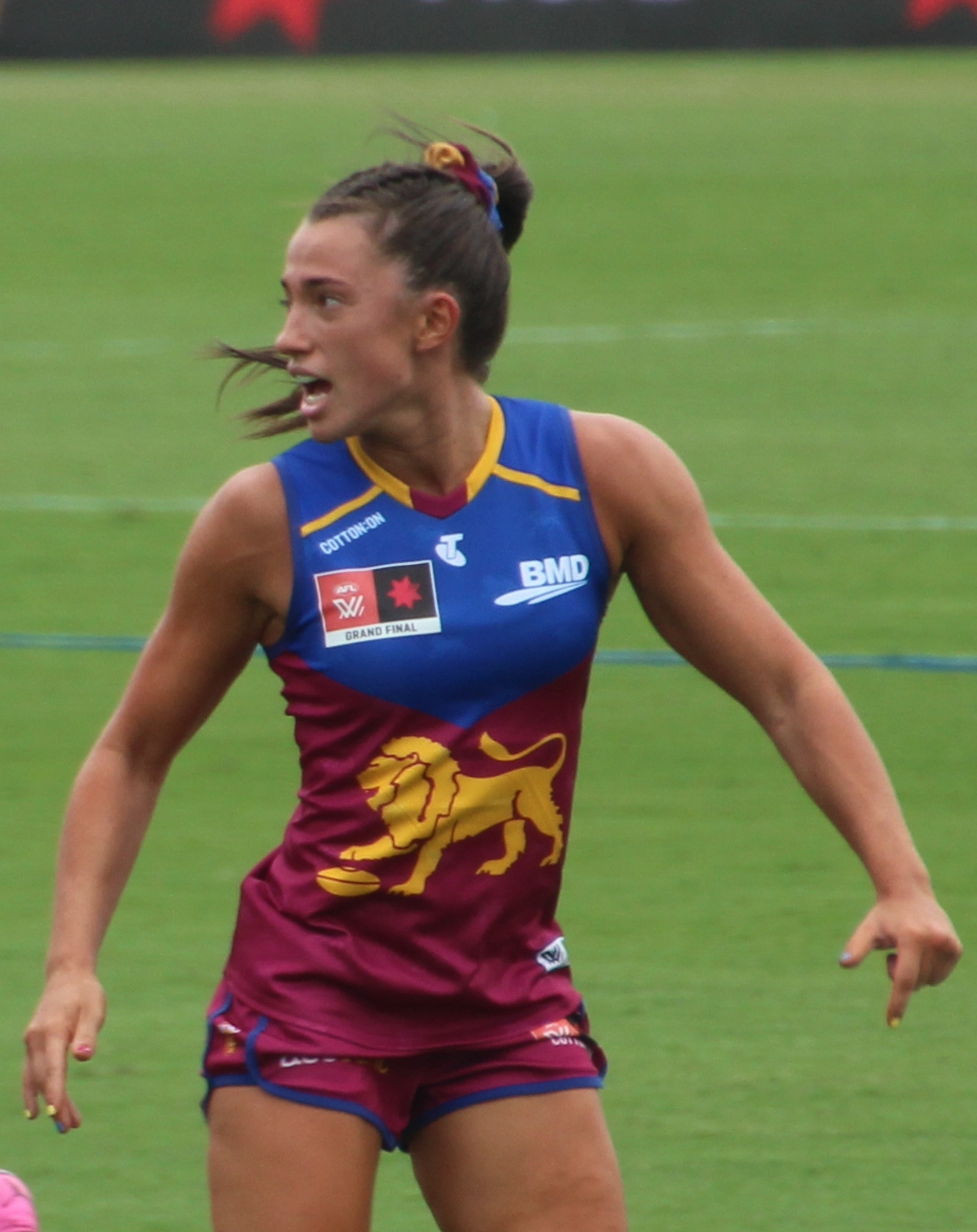
- Ellenger playing for Brisbane in the 2022 season 7 Grand Final

Personal information
- Born: 4 March 2000 (age 26); London, England
- Original team: Coorparoo (QWAFL)
- Draft: Post-draft rookie compensation selection, 2018
- Debut: Round 6, 2019, Brisbane vs. Carlton, at Princes Park
- Height: 164 cm (5 ft 5 in)
- Position: Defender/Midfielder

Club information
- Current club: Brisbane
- Number: 5

Playing career^{1}
Years	Club	Games (Goals)
2019–	Brisbane	50 (6)
- ^{1} Playing statistics correct to the end of the 2023 season.

Career highlights
- AFLW premiership player: 2021, 2023

Jade Ellenger (born 4 March 2000) is an Australian rules footballer playing for Brisbane in the AFL Women's (AFLW) competition.

== Early life ==
Ellenger was born in South East London in England. Her parents migrated to Australia when she was 4 settling in Brisbane, Queensland at Redland City. She attended Victoria Point High School playing basketball and athletics. Between the ages of 14 and 18 she excelled in basketball deciding to focus on that sport where she made the state championships with Logan City. She took up Australian rules at the age of 15 when her teacher offered her the day off school to play in a local AFL competition, after her first game she developed a passion for the sport, deciding to switch from basketball to football.

Ellenger played for Coorparoo in the AFL Queensland Women's League (QWAFL). She played 14 matches during the 2018 season, including the Grand Final, which they lost to Wilston Grange. She represented Queensland in the 2018 AFL Women's Under 18 Championships, playing every game and being named amongst the best in their loss to Vic Country and in their victory over Eastern Allies. Also after being drafted to the AFLW, Ellenger continued playing with Coorparoo in the off-seasons. She helped them win the 2019 premiership, beating Bond University, and was named in the Team of the Year.

== AFLW career ==
Ellenger was recruited by Brisbane as a post-draft rookie compensation selection in 2018, after Brisbane lost many players to expansion clubs Geelong and North Melbourne. She made her AFLW debut in Brisbane's round 6 game against Carlton at Princes Park on 10 March 2019, kicking two goals. In April 2019, Ellenger re-signed with Brisbane for the 2020 season.

== Playing style ==
Ellenger can play as a defender, a half-back, or a midfielder. Despite her smaller size, her playing style is similar to Kate Lutkins.

== Personal life ==
Ellenger has studied paramedic science and as of September 2024 is completing a Master of Nursing.

Ellenger was previously in a long distance relationship with Sydney co-captain Chloe Molloy until 2026.
