= Eilish O'Dowd =

Personal information
- Full name: Eilish O'Dowd
- Born: 25 March 1998 (age 28)
- Original team: Leitrim
- Draft: 2024 rookie signing
- Debut: Round 1, 2019, Greater Western Sydney vs. Western Bulldogs, at Manuka Oval
- Height: 180 cm (5 ft 11 in)
- Position: Ruck

Club information
- Current club: Greater Western Sydney
- Number: 15

Playing career^{1}
Years	Club	Games (Goals)
2024–	Greater Western Sydney	23 (9)

International team honours^{2}
Years	Team	Games (Goals)
2026	Ireland	1 (0)
- ^{1} Playing statistics correct to the end of the 2025 season.^{2} Representative statistics correct as of 2026.

Eilish O'Dowd (born 25 March 1998) is an Irish Ladies' Gaelic football and Australian Rules Football player who is a member of the Greater Western Sydney Giants AFL Women's team.. O'Dowd was a member of the Dublin team that won the 2023 All-Ireland Senior Ladies' Football Championship. O'Dowd had previously played Ladies' Gaelic football for the Leitrim county football team.
