= Yvonne Bonner =

Personal information
- Born: 14 April 1987 (age 39)
- Original team: Donegal
- Draft: 2018 rookie signing
- Debut: Round 1, 2019, Greater Western Sydney vs. Brisbane, at Moreton Bay Sports Complex
- Height: 170 cm (5 ft 7 in)
- Position: Forward

Club information
- Current club: Adelaide
- Number: 31

Playing career^{1}
| Years | Club | Games (Goals) |
| 2019–2021 | Greater Western Sydney | 11 (7) |
| 2023 | Adelaide | 10 (6) |
| Total | | 21 (13) |
- ^{1} Playing statistics correct to the end of the 2025 season.

Yvonne Bonner (born 14 April 1987) is a Gaelic football and Australian rules football player. She currently plays for Adelaide in the AFL Women's, and has previously played for Greater Western Sydney.

Bonner played her first ladies' Gaelic football match in 2002. She plays for the Donegal county team. Bonner was recruited to play for the Greater Western Sydney Giants AFLW team in 2018. Bonner played her first AFLW game on 3 February 2019.

She spent the 2021 season on the inactive list due to travel and residency complications related to the COVID-19 pandemic, and did not return for the 2022 seasons.

She returned in 2023 with Adelaide after they picked in the supplementary draft.

== See also ==
- Irish experiment § AFLW
