= Clara Fitzpatrick =

Australian rules footballer

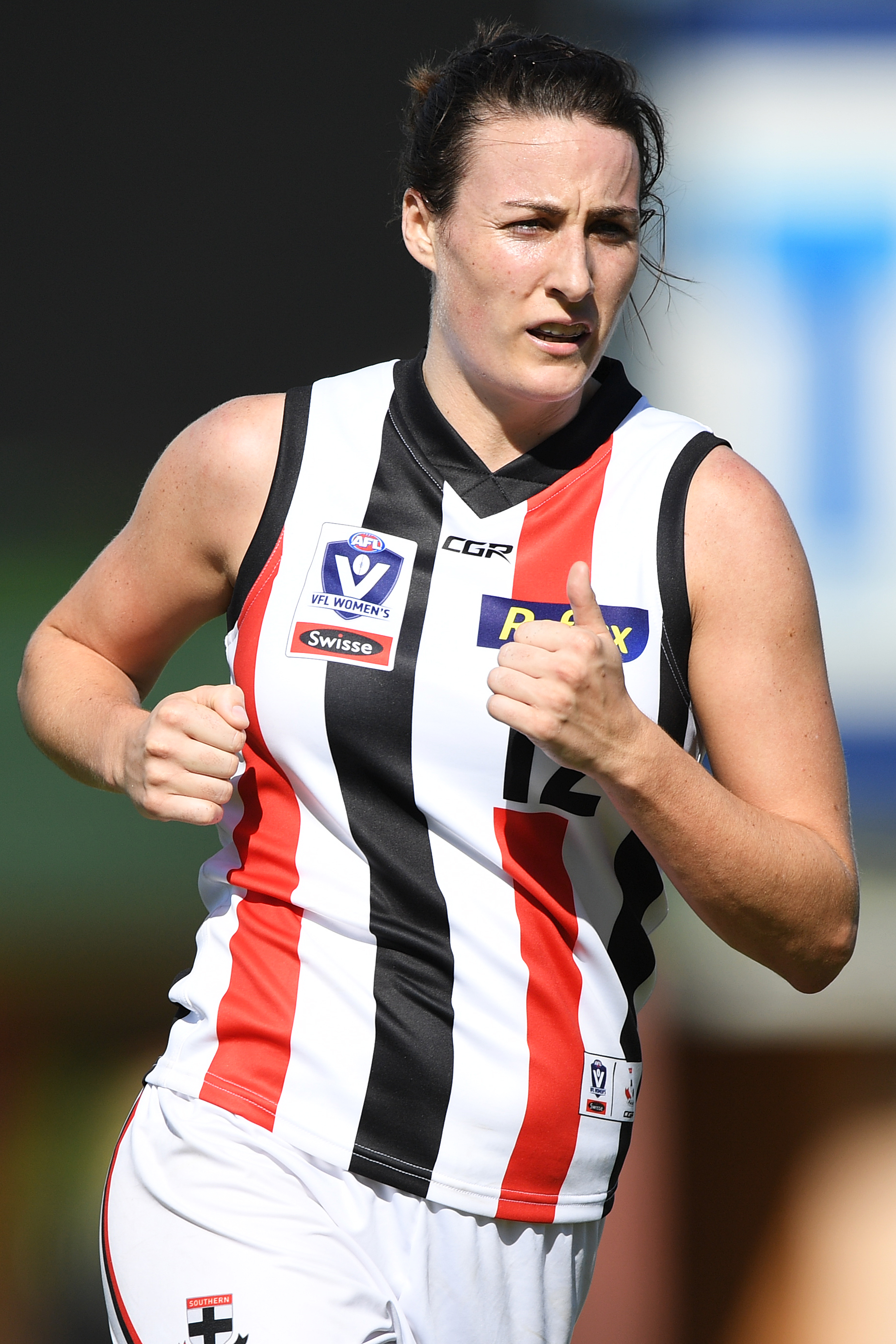
- Fitzpatrick playing for the Southern Saints in May 2019

Personal information
- Born: 1 October 1990 (age 36)
- Original team: Down LGFA / Southern Saints (VFLW)
- Draft: 2019 rookie signing
- Debut: Round 1, 2020, St Kilda vs. Western Bulldogs, at RSEA Park
- Height: 184 cm (6 ft 0 in)
- Position: Defender

Club information
- Current club: Gold Coast
- Number: 9

Playing career^{1}
Years	Club	Games (Goals)
2020–2021; 2022 (S7)	St Kilda	12 (0)
2023–	Gold Coast	8 (0)
Total		20 (0)

International team honours^{2}
Years	Team	Games (Goals)
2017–2026	Ireland	6 (0)
- ^{1} Playing statistics correct to the end of the 2023 season.^{2} Representative statistics correct as of 2026.

Clara Fitzpatrick (born 1 October 1990) is a dual-code international footballer (Australian rules football and Gaelic football) currently playing in the AFL Women's (AFLW) for the Gold Coast. She has previously played for St Kilda.

== Early life ==
Fitzpatrick is from Bryansford in County Down, Northern Ireland. She began playing Gaelic football at the University of Ulster in Jordanstown. She also played for Bryansford Gaelic Football Club in her home town, and represented Down LGFA in the All-Ireland Junior Football Championship. As well as this, she played in international Gaelic football tournaments while touring England and Portugal. From 2012 to 2014 she played for University College team in Dublin.

In 2016 she arrived in Melbourne while travelling Australia and joined the Melbourne University Football Club where she learned to play with the oval ball. Shortly afterward she and Irish international Laura Duryea joined the Diamond Creek Football Club. Fitzpatrick's game developed quickly and she became one of the best Irish players in Australia receiving a call up, along with Duryea, for Ireland's women's national team, the Banshees for the 2017 Australian Football International Cup as a ruck. She was part of the side that defeated Canada in the final to take the trophy and was named in the Women's World Team, alongside Duryea, in the ruck.

In 2019 she tried out for St Kilda Football Club's VFLW side Southern Saints. After dominating in the backline she was offered an AFLW rookie contract with St Kilda and was drafted during the 2019 rookie signing period.

== AFLW career ==
She made her debut against Western Bulldogs at RSEA Park in the opening round of the 2020 season. In June 2021, she was delisted by the club after missing the 2021 AFL Women's season due to visa issues. In June 2022, after being not listed for a season, Fitzpatrick returned to St Kilda.

In March 2023, Fitzpatrick was traded to the Gold Coast as part of a five-club deal.
