= Emmelie Fiedler =

Australian rules footballer

Personal information
- Born: 5 April 2002 (age 24); Germany
- Original teams: East Fremantle (WAFLW); Malaysian Warriors (AFL Asia)
- Draft: No. 7, 2023 supplementary draft
- Debut: Round 3, 2024, St Kilda vs. Essendon, at Windy Hill
- Height: 187 cm (6 ft 2 in)
- Position: Ruck

Playing career^{1}
Years	Club	Games (Goals)
2023	Fremantle	0 (0)
2024–	St Kilda	6 (0)
Total		6 (0)
- ^{1} Playing statistics correct to the end of the 2025 season.

Emmelie Fiedler (born 5 April 2002) is a professional Australian rules footballer who plays for the St Kilda Football Club in the AFL Women's (AFLW).

== Early life ==
Fiedler was born in Germany to a German mother and an Australian father. Her father supported Fremantle in the Australian Football League from his home town of Perth, Australia. She was raised in Kuala Lumpur, Malaysia with her two older sisters.

Fiedler tried many sports in her youth, including Gaelic football, synchronised swimming and volleyball. In 2019, she joined the training program for the Malaysian Warriors' inaugural Australian football women's team, sparked by the introduction of the AFL Women's competition in Australia. Fiedler won the Asian Australian Football Championships in 2019 with the Warriors.

In 2020, Fiedler moved to Perth to study marketing at Curtin University. She played football for the University before joining East Fremantle's women's program. She progressed from their reserves to their senior team, and in 2023 she was drafted by Fremantle with pick seven in the 2023 AFL Women's supplementary draft.

== AFL Women's career ==
During her first season as a professional athlete, Fiedler did not make a senior appearance for Fremantle, and was delisted by the club at the conclusion of the 2023 season. She was subsequently signed by St Kilda as a replacement rookie.

Fielder made her AFL Women's debut in the round 3, 2024 match against Essendon at Windy Hill. She would go on to play six games for the season. She then missed the entirety of the 2025 season after rupturing her anterior cruciate ligament.

== Statistics ==
Updated to the end of the 2025 season.

Legend
G	Goals	K	Kicks	D	Disposals	T	Tackles
B	Behinds	H	Handballs	M	Marks	H/O	Hit-outs

Season	Team	No.	Games	Totals								Averages (per game)							
Season	Team	No.	Games	G	B	K	H	D	M	T	H/O	G	B	K	H	D	M	T	H/O
2023	Fremantle	50	0	–	–	–	–	–	–	–	–	–	–	–	–	–	–	–	–
2024	St Kilda	50	6	0	1	13	14	27	7	23	122	0.0	0.2	2.2	2.3	4.5	1.2	3.8	20.3
2025	St Kilda	50	0	–	–	–	–	–	–	–	–	–	–	–	–	–	–	–	–
Career			6	0	1	13	14	27	7	23	122	0.0	0.2	2.2	2.3	4.5	1.2	3.8	20.3
