= Helen Roden =

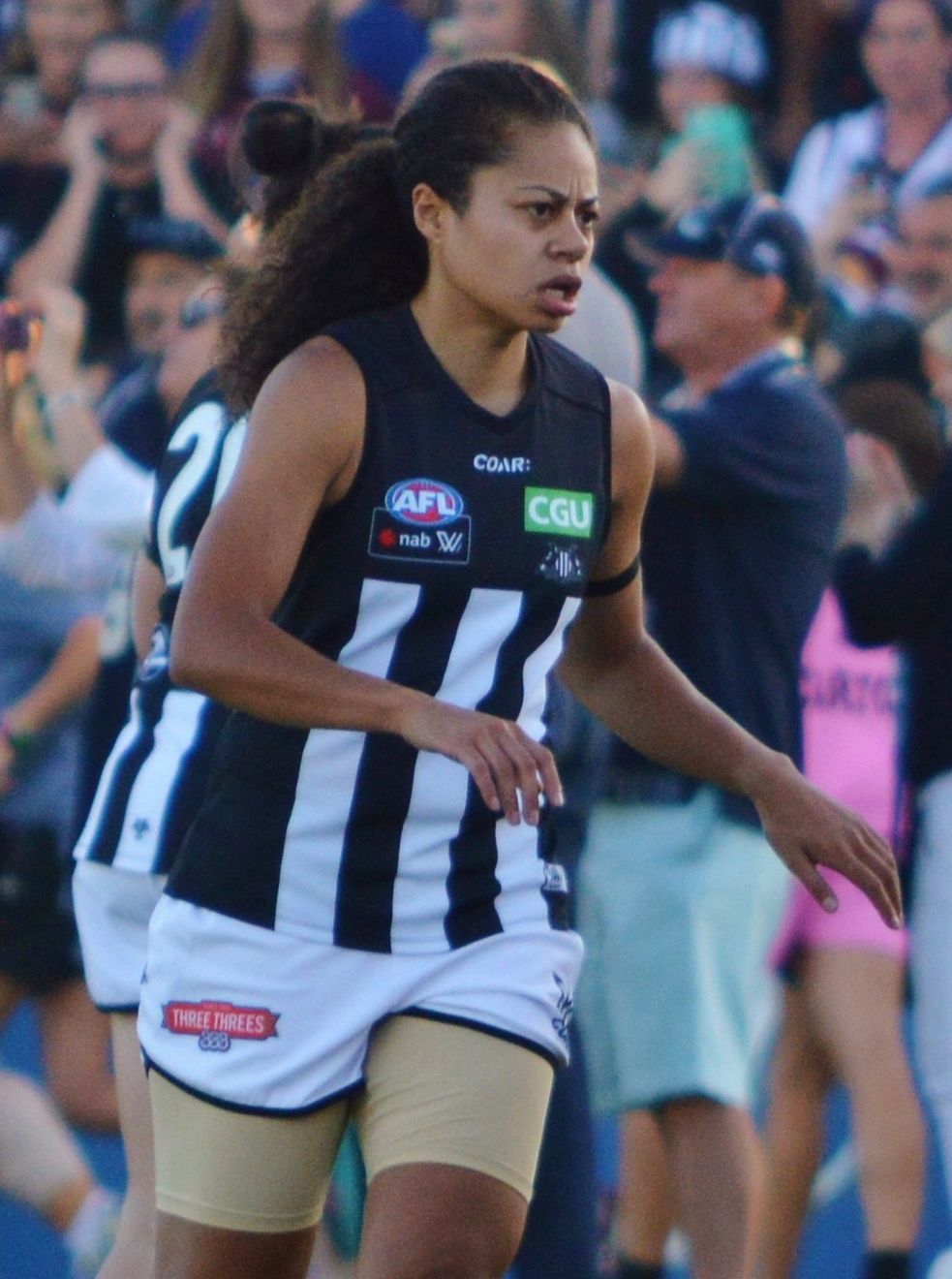
- Roden playing for Collingwood in February 2017

Personal information
- Full name: Helen Gloria Roden
- Born: 26 March 1986 (age 40); Fiji
- Draft: Rookie signing 2016: Collingwood
- Debut: Round 1, 2017, Collingwood vs. Carlton, at IKON Park
- Height: 175 cm (5 ft 9 in)
- Position: Forward

Playing career^{1}
Years	Club	Games (Goals)
2017	Collingwood	1 (0)
- ^{1} Playing statistics correct to the end of the 2017 season.

Helen Gloria Roden (born 26 March 1986) is a professional athlete who played for college basketball club TCU Horned Frogs and for Australian rules football club Collingwood in the AFL Women's (AFLW).

== Early life and state football ==
Roden was born in Fiji and moved to Melbourne at the age of one. As a teenager she played in local football clubs, including six years at Oak Park where she won the best and fairest award, but moved to basketball since there were no girls' teams after the age of 16. She played for the Victorian School girls' basketball team from 1999 to 2003 and competed for the Australian School girls' basketball team from 2000 to 2003, before graduating from Penola Catholic College in 2003.

Roden returned to football in August 2016, playing the last two games of the season with VFLW club VU Western Spurs, kicking a goal in each game.

== Basketball career ==
In her junior college year, Roden played for Odessa College in the Western Junior College Athletic Conference (WJCAC). In 2005–06, her final year, she averaged 15.1 points, 7.7 assists and 2.5 steals per game, and led Odessa College to the NJCAA Division I Women's Basketball Championship final, which they lost to Monroe Community College. She was named the Texas Association of Basketball Coaches Junior College Player of the Year, selected for all-conference, all-region and all-state teams, and was selected to try out for the Junior Australian Team in 2006.

In 2006, Roden joined Texas Christian University's team, the TCU Horned Frogs. In her junior year, she played in every game, starting 21 of them. She finished fifth on the team with a scoring average of 6.0. In her senior year, she played mostly off the bench, recording reserve-best averages of 23.2 minutes and 8.2 points per game. She was ranked fourth on the squad and 25th in the Mountain West Conference in average scoring that season.

== AFL Women's career ==
"My brother said, 'Hey, give footy a try, it's going to be big in a few years'. I did a lot of skills with him before I started playing again because I knew how good the girls were at it and I didn’t want to get into it just because of my brother's name."

— Roden speaking in 2017 about returning to football.

Roden returned to football with the encouragement of her brother, David Rodan, and was signed by Collingwood as a rookie-listed player. She made her debut in round one, 2017, in the inaugural AFLW match at IKON Park against Carlton, which she ended on the interchange bench due to an injury to her left leg.

Roden was delisted by Collingwood ahead of the 2018 season.

== Personal life ==
Roden's brother is David Rodan, retired professional footballer who played for Richmond, Port Adelaide, and Melbourne. Roden spells her last name differently to the rest of her family due to a passport error which was never fixed.

== Statistics ==
Statistics are correct to the end of the 2017 season.

Legend
G	Goals	K	Kicks	D	Disposals	T	Tackles
B	Behinds	H	Handballs	M	Marks

Season	Team	No.	Games	Totals							Averages (per game)						
Season	Team	No.	Games	G	B	K	H	D	M	T	G	B	K	H	D	M	T
2017	Collingwood	11	1	0	0	3	1	4	1	5	0.0	0.0	3.0	1.0	4.0	1.0	5.0
Career			1	0	0	3	1	4	1	5	0.0	0.0	3.0	1.0	4.0	1.0	5.0
