= Ailish Considine =

Irish player of Australian rules footballer

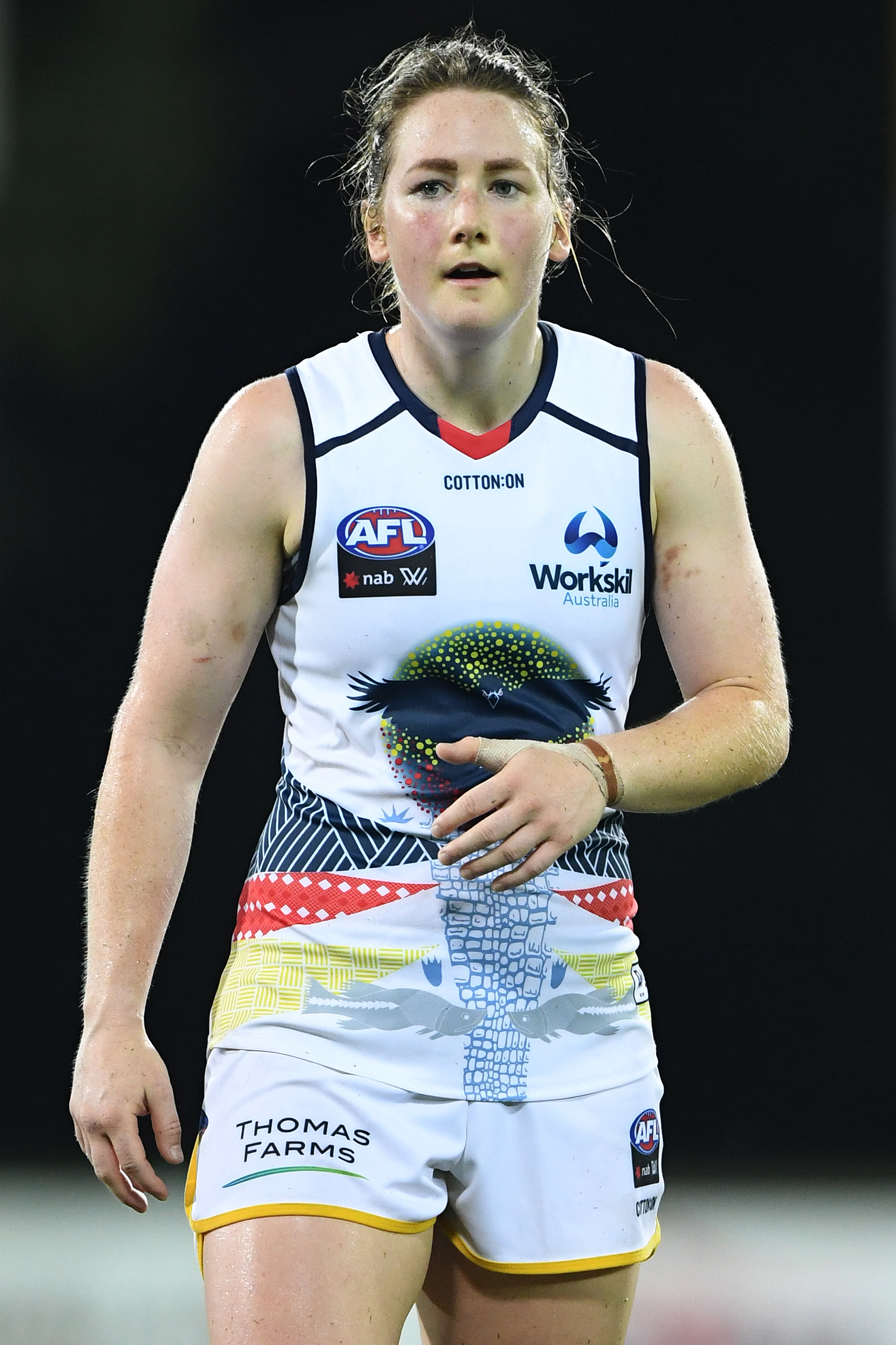
- Considine playing for Adelaide in 2019

Personal information
- Born: 9 July 1992 (age 34); Ireland
- Draft: 2018 rookie signing
- Debut: Round 1, 2019, Adelaide vs. Western Bulldogs, at Norwood Oval
- Height: 166 cm (5 ft 5 in)
- Position: Wing/half-forward

Playing career^{1}
Years	Club	Games (Goals)
2019–S7 (2022)	Adelaide	26 (9)
2023	North Melbourne	1 (0)
Total		27 (9)
- ^{1} Playing statistics correct to the end of the 2023 season.

Career highlights
- 2× AFL Women's premiership player: 2019, 2022 (S6)

Ailish Considine (born 9 July 1992) is an Irish former Australian rules footballer who played for Adelaide and North Melbourne in the AFL Women's.

After playing ladies' Gaelic football and camogie for the Clare county teams in her native Ireland, Adelaide drafted Considine as a rookie signing. She made her debut in the one-point loss to the Western Bulldogs at Norwood Oval in the opening round of the 2019 season. She was the first Irish female to become a Premiership Player with the Adelaide Crows in 2019 when they defeated Carlton in the grand final at a full capacity Adelaide Oval. In December 2022, Adelaide delisted Considine after she was on the injury list all of AFL Women's season seven.

She joined North Melbourne ahead of the 2023 season as a replacement player for fellow Irishwoman Vikki Wall. After playing one game for the club, she retired at the end of the season.

== Statistics ==
Legend
G	Goals	K	Kicks	D	Disposals	T	Tackles
B	Behinds	H	Handballs	M	Marks
#	Played in that season's premiership team

Season	Team	No.	Games	Totals							Averages (per game)							Votes
Season	Team	No.	Games	G	B	K	H	D	M	T	G	B	K	H	D	M	T	Votes
2019^{#}	Adelaide	16	8	4	2	44	12	56	8	12	0.5	0.3	5.5	1.5	7.0	1.0	1.5	0
2020	Adelaide	16	4	2	1	18	6	24	5	1	0.5	0.3	4.5	1.5	6.0	1.3	0.3	0
2021	Adelaide	16	4	1	0	26	4	30	2	2	0.3	0.0	6.5	1.0	7.5	0.5	0.5	0
2022 (S6)^{#}	Adelaide	16	10	2	1	56	19	75	12	14	0.2	0.1	5.6	1.9	7.5	1.2	1.4	0
2022 (S7)	Adelaide	16	0	—	—	—	—	—	—	—	—	—	—	—	—	—	—	0
2023	North Melbourne	27	1	0	0	2	1	3	1	0	0.0	0.0	2.0	1.0	3.0	1.0	0.0	0
Career			27	9	4	146	42	188	28	29	0.3	0.1	5.4	1.6	7.0	1.0	1.1	0

== Personal life ==
Considine was born in Ireland. She grew up playing ladies' Gaelic football with her club Kilmihil and camogie with Kilmaley, while also representing Clare at the highest level as a dual player. She studied Exercise & Fitness Science at the University of Limerick, and graduated in 2018. From January 2020 until April 2022, Considine wrote an occasional "Aussie Rules Diary" for RTÉ.ie, in which she discussed her experiences as a professional athlete in Adelaide. In that diary, she referenced being in a relationship with Adelaide teammate Anne Hatchard. Her sister Eimear plays international rugby for the Ireland women's team.
