= Janelle Cuthbertson =

Australian rules footballer

Janelle Ann Cuthbertson
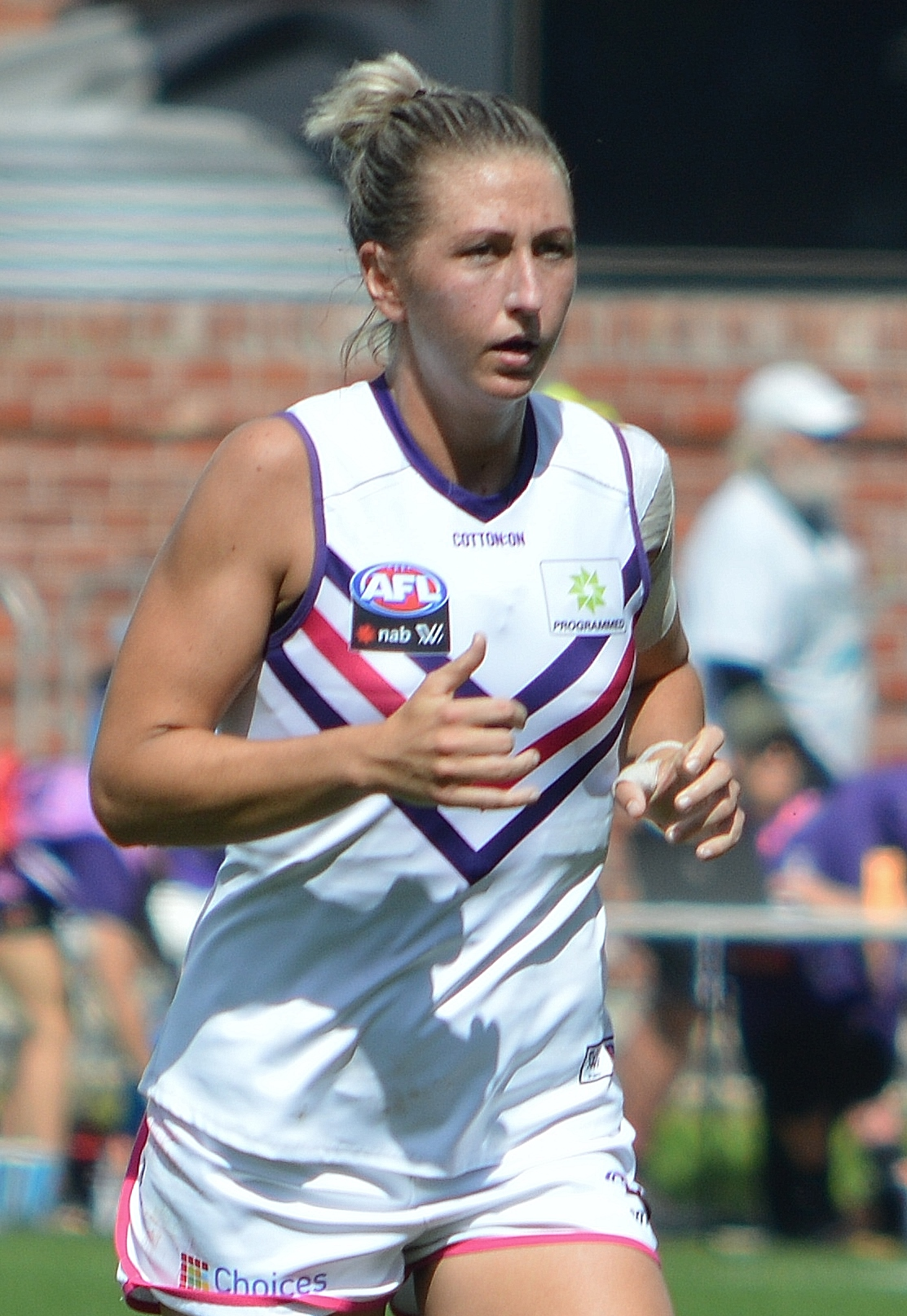
- Cuthbertson with Fremantle in March 2021

Personal information
- Born: 3 September 1990 (age 36)
- Original team: Fremantle
- Draft: No 81, 2019
- Debut: Round 1, 2020, Fremantle vs. Geelong, at Fremantle Oval
- Height: 175 cm (5 ft 9 in)
- Position: Defender

Playing career^{1}
Years	Club	Games (Goals)
2020–S7 (2022)	Fremantle	24 (0)
2023–2025	Port Adelaide	8 (0)
Total		32 (0)
- ^{1} Playing statistics correct to the end of 2025.

Janelle Ann Cuthbertson (born 3 September 1990) is a former Australian rules footballer who played for Port Adelaide and Fremantle in the AFL Women's (AFLW).

== Early life ==
Cuthbertson was born in Perth, Western Australia. She attended Texas A&M University between 2009 and 2013 and was on their tennis team.

== AFLW career ==
Cuthbertson was drafted by Fremantle ahead of the 2020 AFL Women's season.

Cuthbertson had a breakout season in 2021, being named in the 2021 AFL Women's All-Australian team on the half-back flank after a strong season as an intercepting defender. It was announced she re-signed with the Dockers for two more seasons on 5 June 2021.

In March 2023, Cuthbertson joined Port Adelaide as part of the 2023 AFL Women's season period of priority signings. She quickly established herself as a reliable and consistent performer at the club, and was appointed Port Adelaide captain ahead of the 2024 season. Cuthbertson suffered an ACL injury in Round 2, causing her to miss the rest of the season. She stepped down as captain ahead of the 2025 season.

Cuthbertson was preparing for a return in late September 2025, but in a cruel twist, she suffered another ACL injury during training, ruling her out for the remainder of the season. On 3 November, Cuthbertson announced her retirement from the competition.

== Statistics ==
Statistics are correct to the end of 2025.

Legend
G	Goals	K	Kicks	D	Disposals	T	Tackles
B	Behinds	H	Handballs	M	Marks

Season	Team	No.	Games	Totals							Averages (per game)							Votes
Season	Team	No.	Games	G	B	K	H	D	M	T	G	B	K	H	D	M	T	Votes
2020	Fremantle	29	5	0	0	18	9	27	6	11	0.0	0.0	3.6	1.8	5.4	1.2	2.2	0
2021	Fremantle	29	10	0	0	75	13	88	27	12	0.0	0.0	7.5	1.3	8.8	2.7	1.2	0
2022 (S6)	Fremantle	29	4	0	0	33	7	40	13	7	0.0	0.0	8.3	1.8	10.0	3.3	1.8	0
2022 (S7)	Fremantle	29	5	0	0	28	3	31	13	11	0.0	0.0	5.6	0.6	6.2	2.6	2.2	0
2023	Port Adelaide	25	6	0	0	38	7	45	19	15	0.0	0.0	6.3	1.2	7.5	3.2	2.5	0
2024	Port Adelaide	1	2	0	0	10	1	11	6	5	0.0	0.0	5.0	0.5	5.5	3.0	2.5	0
2025	Port Adelaide	1	0	0	0	0	0	0	0	0	0.0	0.0	0.0	0.0	0.0	0.0	0.0	-
Career			32	0	0	202	40	242	84	61	0.0	0.0	6.3	1.3	7.6	2.6	1.9	0
