= Brooke Walker (footballer) =

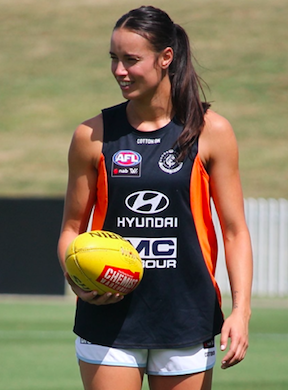
- Walker with Carlton February 2019

Personal information
- Full name: Brooke-Morgan Joanne Walker
- Born: 3 January 1995 (age 31); Auckland, New Zealand
- Original team: Carlton FC (VFL Women's)
- Height: 173 cm (5 ft 8 in)
- Position: Wing/Forward

Club information
- Current club: Essendon

Playing career^{1}
Years	Club	Games (Goals)
2019–S7 (2022)	Carlton	26 (14)
2023–	Essendon	11 (0)
Total		37 (14)
- ^{1} Playing statistics correct to the end of the 2023 season.

Brooke-Morgan Joanne Walker (born 3 January 1995) is a triple-code women's footballer, playing at the highest level in Rugby Sevens (Australia), Australian rules football (AFLW) and Rugby league (NRLW).

Walker is also a former Australian rugby union sevens and Touch Football Australia representative player.

== Early life ==
Brooke grew up in Christchurch before moving to the Gold Coast, Queensland and completed her high schooling at Keebra Park High School. She played rugby league until the age of 10. At the age of 14 she moved to Australia.

Walker made her debut for Australia in Touch Football in 2011 at the Youth Trans Tasman series vs New Zealand in which the team was unbeaten in a three game series.

== Rugby union ==
Following this in 2013, Walker debut for Australia in Rugby Sevens being part of the team that competed and won gold at the 2013 Australian Youth Olympic Festival before debuting at an open level on the world series at the 2015 USA Women's Sevens a month after being granted her Australian citizenship. Walker won silver playing for Australia in rugby sevens at the 2015 Pacific Games held in Port Moresby and was the travelling reserve for the Australian women's sevens team that won gold at the 2016 Summer Olympics.

== Australian rules football ==
In 2019, Brooke transitioned from Rugby Sevens to AFLW where she made her debut for Carlton Football Club against Greater Western Sydney as the team recorded its highest ever score in the AFLW competition. She signed a two-year contract with Carlton on 10 June 2021, after it was revealed the team had conducted a mass re-signing of 13 players.

In March 2023, Walker was traded to Essendon in exchange for pick #9.

== Rugby league ==
In an effort to reach NRLW level, Walker signed with the Werribee Bears at the end of 2020 and after just one game was called up to represent Victoria at the National Championships.
In May 2022, Walker signed to play with the Parramatta Eels in the 2022 NRL Women's season. Walker played the full 70 minutes at Five-eighth in the Eel's Round 1 match on 20 August 2022, kicking two goals from three conversion attempts in a 16-38 loss to the Sydney Roosters. Walker did not play in the Eels' subsequent six matches of the 2022 season.

== See also ==
- List of players who have converted from one football code to another
