= Áine Tighe =

Australian rules footballer

Personal information
- Born: 25 July 1992 (age 34)
- Original teams: Leitrim, GAA
- Draft: International Rookie selection, 2019
- Debut: Round 1, 2022, Fremantle vs. West Coast, at Fremantle Oval
- Height: 185 cm (6 ft 1 in)
- Position: Forward

Club information
- Current club: Fremantle
- Number: 10

Playing career^{1}
Years	Club	Games (Goals)
2019–	Fremantle	34 (29)
- ^{1} Playing statistics correct to the end of the 2025 season.

Career highlights
- 2× Fremantle leading goalkicker: 2022 (S7), 2023

Áine Tighe (born 25 July 1992) is an Irish Australian rules footballer for the Fremantle Football Club in the AFL Women's (AFLW). She previously played Gaelic football in Ireland for Leitrim.

== Early life ==
Tighe is a native of Kiltubbrid, County Leitrim, Ireland. She played Gaelic football for Leitrim GAA, where she captained her side to two county championships. She left home to attend the University of Limerick, playing Gaelic Football with future Fremantle teammates Aisling McCarthy and Joanne Cregg. She missed an Irish recruitment camp in Australia in 2018 after suffering an ACL injury. She was working as a teacher while recovering from her injury in 2019. Later that year, she was picked to represent Ireland at the AFL Europe Championship in London.

== AFLW career ==
At the end of 2019, Tighe was recruited to the Fremantle Football Club in the AFL Women's (AFLW) in Australia to fill the ruck role. However, in late January 2020, she tore her ACL for a second time in a pre-season game against Adelaide. After missing the entire 2020 season, she went on to miss the entire 2021 season as well due to a medial meniscus tear. She made her debut in the opening round of the 2022 AFL Women's season 6. She kicked her first goal against Richmond in round three and then was forced into defence following an injury to Janelle Cuthbertson.

Tighe became a mainstay of Fremantle's forward line during the 2022 AFL Women's season 7, culminating in her finishing third in the Fremantle fairest and best award and was the club's leading goalkicker for the season with 11 goals. In round three of the 2023 season, she kicked three goals and had 12 marks (five contested) and 20 disposals in a win over Hawthorn. She again led the club for goals kicked with nine.

In week four of the 2024 season, Tighe suffered another ACL injury, causing her to miss the remainder of the season. She returned midway through the 2025 season, but suffered another knee injury in her first game back.
