= Tanya Kennedy =

Personal information
- Full name: Tanya Kennedy
- Born: 8 July 1993 (age 33)
- Original team: UTS
- Height: 173 cm (5 ft 8 in)
- Position: Midfielder

Club information
- Current club: Sydney
- Number: 29

Playing career^{1}
Years	Club	Games (Goals)
2023–	Sydney	26 (1)
- ^{1} Playing statistics correct to the end of round 3 of 2025 season.

Tanya Kennedy (born 8 July 1993) is an Australian rules footballer playing for the Sydney Swans in the AFL Women's (AFLW). Originally from Ireland, Kennedy has also played Gaelic football for her home county of Donegal. She migrated to Australia in 2012 and first played Australian football with the Inner West Magpies in the AFL Sydney competition.

Kennedy was signed by Sydney as an injury replacement player on the eve of the 2023 season. After making her debut in round 1 of that season against Greater Western Sydney, Kennedy went on to play all 11 games as the Swans reached their maiden AFLW finals series. Kennedy regularly played as a defensive midfielder, including roles on Emily Bates, Brianna Davey, and Claudia Whitfort in a standout performance in her side's elimination final win over Gold Coast.

Outside football, Kennedy works as a traffic controller.
