= Neasa Dooley =

Personal information
- Born: 6 April 2000 (age 26); Athy, County Kildare, Ireland
- Original team: Kildare (GAA)
- Debut: Round 2, 2025, Brisbane vs. Fremantle, at Fremantle Oval
- Height: 178 cm (5 ft 10 in)
- Position: Half-forward

Club information
- Current club: Brisbane
- Number: 13

Playing career^{1}
Years	Club	Games (Goals)
2025–	Brisbane	14 (10)

International team honours^{2}
Years	Team	Games (Goals)
2026	Ireland	1 (1)
- ^{1} Playing statistics correct to the end of 2025.^{2} Representative statistics correct as of 2026.

Neasa Dooley (born 6 April 2000) is an Irish Australian rules footballer who plays for Brisbane in the AFL Women's (AFLW).

== Early life and Gaelic football ==
Born in Athy, Dooley played with Kildare GAA and was a member of the team that won the All-Ireland Intermediate Ladies' Football Championship in 2023.

== AFL Women's career ==
In December 2024, Dooley was recruited to the Brisbane Lions. She played her first match for the team on 23 August 2025 in round 2 against Fremantle, where she scored two goals in the 70-point win.
