= Amy Boyle-Carr =

Irish footballer (born 2001)

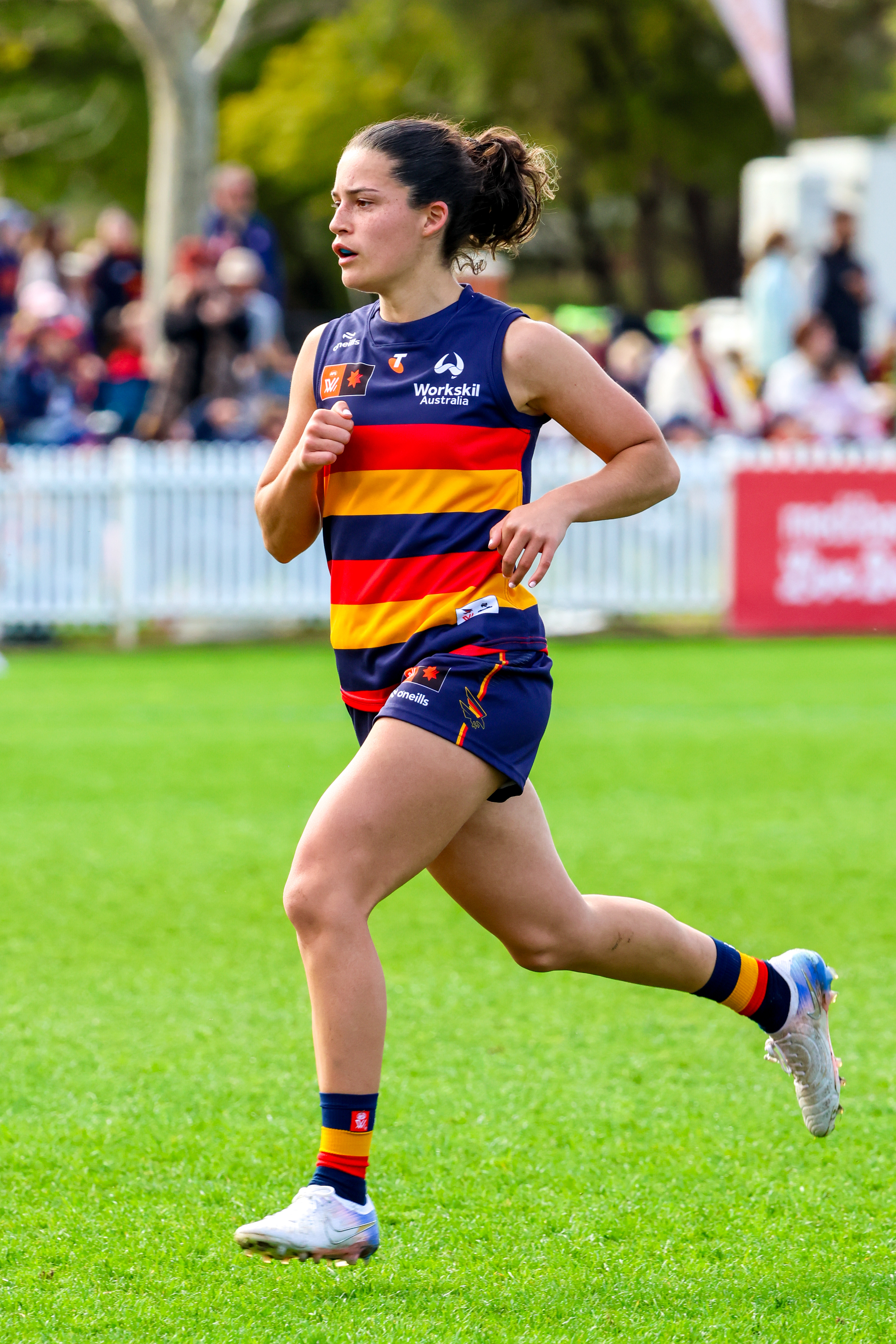
- Boyle-Carr with Adelaide in 2026

Personal information
- Date of birth: 6 January 2001 (age 25)
- Position: Midfielder

Team information
- Current team: Sligo Rovers
- Number: 19

Youth career
- Lagan Harps
- Donegal Town

Senior career*
Years	Team	Apps	(Gls)
2017–2019	Sion Swifts		
2022	Sligo Rovers	8	(1)

International career^{‡}
2018	Republic of Ireland	1	(0)
- * Club domestic league appearances and goals as of 11:58, 31 July 2022 (UTC) ‡ National team caps and goals as of 11:58, 31 July 2022 (UTC)

Amy Boyle-Carr (born 6 January 2001) is an Irish professional Australian rules footballer who plays for the Adelaide Crows in the AFL Women's. She was previously a footballer who last played as a midfielder for Sligo Rovers and has appeared for the Republic of Ireland women's national team. She also played ladies' Gaelic football for the Donegal county team.

== Club career ==
Boyle-Carr is from Glenties. She played youth soccer for Lagan Harps and Donegal Town, and represented Donegal in the Gaynor Cup. In January 2017 she signed for Sion Swifts of the Northern Ireland Women's Premiership.

In July 2022 Boyle-Carr made a soccer comeback, signing for Women's National League (WNL) club Sligo Rovers.

== International career ==
Boyle-Carr has been capped for the Republic of Ireland national team, appearing for the team during the 2019 FIFA Women's World Cup qualifying cycle. Impressed by her performances with the Republic of Ireland under-17s, Ireland coach Colin Bell named 16-year-old Boyle-Carr in his senior squad for two friendlies with Portugal at the Estádio de São Miguel, Ponta Delgada, in January 2018.

She won her first senior cap on 10 April 2018, in a 2–0 FIFA Women's World Cup qualifying defeat by European champions the Netherlands at Tallaght Stadium. Boyle-Carr had acquired tickets to attend the match as a supporter, so was surprised to be picked to play.

== Gaelic games ==
As well as soccer, Boyle-Carr plays ladies' Gaelic football. In 2019 she decided to focus on playing for the Donegal county team. Boyle-Carr was a three-time Ulster champion with the club. She played with Donegal until she switched codes to Australian rules football in August 2024.

== AFL Women's career ==
Amy Boyle-Carr

Club information
- Current club: Adelaide
- Number: 24

Playing career^{1}
Years	Club	Games (Goals)
2024–	Adelaide	6 (0)

International team honours^{2}
Years	Team	Games (Goals)
2026	Ireland	1 (0)
- ^{1} Playing statistics correct to the end of 2024.^{2} Representative statistics correct as of 2026.

In March 2024, Boyle-Carr was signed to AFL Women's club the Adelaide Crows for the 2024 season commencing in August. She continued to play out the remainder of the season of ladies' Gaelic football prior to the start of the AFL Women's season.

Boyle-Carr made her senior debut in week four of 2024 against Essendon at Unley Oval. She debuted with 7 disposals in 59% time on ground. Boyle-Carr went on to play six games for the year before being omitted and missing out on the finals series. Her successful debut year was rewarded with a two-year contract extension, keeping her in Adelaide until at least the end of 2026.
