= Aimee Mackin =

Irish footballer

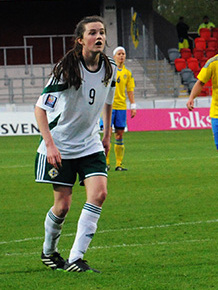
- Mackin playing soccer for Northern Ireland in May 2014
- Born: 22 April 1997 (age 29); Camlough, Northern Ireland
- Height: 170 cm (5 ft 7 in)
Ladies' Gaelic football career
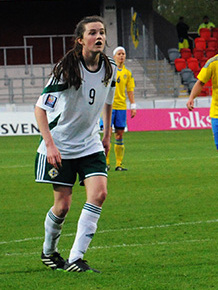
Sport
- Sport: Ladies' Gaelic football
- Position: Forward
Club
- Years: Club
- Shane O'Neill's GAC
Inter-county
- Years: County
- 2015–: Armagh
Inter-county titles
- All Stars: 3
Association football career
- Positions: Midfielder; forward
Youth career
- Bessbrook
- Camlough Rovers
Senior career*
Years	Team	Apps	(Gls)
- Newry City
2018–2019	Sion Swifts		
International career^{‡}
2013–2015	Northern Ireland		
- * Club domestic league appearances and goals as of 15:25, 22 October 2022 (UTC) ‡ National team caps and goals as of 15:25, 22 October 2022 (UTC)
Australian rules football career
Playing career^{1}
Years	Club	Games (Goals)
2023–	Melbourne	6 (2)
- ^{1} Playing statistics correct to the end of the 2023 season.

Aimee Mackin (born 22 April 1997) is an Irish dual code footballer from Camlough in County Armagh. In association football she has played for Women's Premiership clubs Newry City and Sion Swifts, and represented the Northern Ireland women's national football team at both youth and senior level. She also played ladies' Gaelic football for Shane O'Neill's GAC and at senior level for Armagh GAA, competing in the Ladies' National Football League and All-Ireland Senior Ladies' Football Championship. She was named the 2020 TG4 Senior Player's Player of the Year.

== Soccer career ==
=== Club career ===
In September 2015, Newry City won the Northern Ireland Women's Premier League, when Mackin scored a dramatic last-minute winner over Mid-Ulster Ladies. Mackin signed for Sion Swifts in March 2018 after Newry City withdrew from the Women's Premiership.

=== International career ===
==== Youth ====
In 2011 Mackin was called up to represent Northern Ireland at under-15 schoolgirl level while she attended St Paul's High School, Bessbrook. In April 2012 she was a key player in the team which retained the Bob Docherty Cup. By the following season she was participating for the Northern Ireland women's national under-17 football team in their 2013 UEFA Women's Under-17 Championship qualification series.

In February 2015 Mackin scored a hat-trick for the Northern Ireland women's national under-19 football team in a 9–1 win over Estonia at Solitude.

==== Senior ====
Mackin made her senior debut for Northern Ireland in October 2013, during the 2015 FIFA Women's World Cup qualification campaign. She was still 16 years old when she scored against Estonia in March 2014.

== Gaelic football career ==
From a prominent Gaelic Athletic Association (GAA) family, Mackin's father Michael served as a coach and chairman of Shane O'Neill's GAC where Aimee and her five siblings all played. Aimee was among four of the siblings to progress to senior inter-county football with Armagh. She made her debut in 2015 and won All Star honours following a series of promising performances. She won another All Star in 2017, before her progress was derailed by an anterior cruciate ligament injury in July 2019.

After a period of rehabilitation Mackin stopped playing soccer to focus on Gaelic football. Exceptional form on her return led to her winning the 2020 TG4 Senior Player's Player of the Year.

== Australian rules football career ==
In 2022 Mackin's sister and Armagh team-mate Bláithín signed for AFL Women's club Melbourne Football Club, but Aimee decided to remain in Ireland: "I'm probably a bit of a homebird so playing Gaelic is the priority for me at the minute." At the time she was employed as a classroom assistant at her alma mater St Paul's High School.

However in 2023, Aimee decided to join her sister at Melbourne, where she played six games in the 2023 AFL Women's season, including two finals.

== Personal life ==
Mackin attended St Paul's High School, Bessbrook and Ulster University at Jordanstown.
