= Katy Herron =

Female Australian rules footballer

Personal information
- Full name: Katy Herron
- Born: 13 July 1989 (age 37)
- Original team: Donegal (GAA)
- Draft: 2019 rookie signing
- Debut: Round 1, 2020, Western Bulldogs vs. St Kilda, at RSEA Park
- Height: 172 cm (5 ft 8 in)

Playing career^{1}
Years	Club	Games (Goals)
2020–2021	Western Bulldogs	6 (0)
- ^{1} Playing statistics correct to the end of the 2021 season.

Katy Herron (born 13 July 1989) is an Australian rules footballer who played for Western Bulldogs in the AFL Women's (AFLW). In June 2021, she was delisted by the club after spending the 2021 AFL Women's season on the inactive list.
