= Orlagh Lally =

Personal information
- Born: 28 July 2001 (age 25)
- Draft: 2022 rookie signings
- Debut: Round 1, 2022 (S7), Fremantle vs. Brisbane, at The Gabba
- Height: 172 cm (5 ft 8 in)
- Position: Midfielder

Club information
- Current club: Fremantle
- Number: 14

Playing career^{1}
Years	Club	Games (Goals)
2022 (S7)–	Fremantle	45 (11)

International team honours^{2}
Years	Team	Games (Goals)
2026	Ireland	1 (0)
- ^{1} Playing statistics correct to the end of the 2026 season.^{2} Representative statistics correct as of 2026.

Career highlights
- Western Derby Medal (AFLW): 2025

Orlagh Lally (born 28 July 2001) is an Irish Australian rules footballer playing for Fremantle in the AFL Women's (AFLW).

Lally originally played Ladies' Gaelic football for Meath, winning the All-Ireland championships with them in 2021 and 2022.

She arrived in Australia shortly after her 21st birthday, and made her debut in the opening round of the AFL Women's season 7. Lally was named in the 22 under 22 squad for the 2023 AFL Women's season.

In 2025, Lally was awarded the Western Derby medal for being the best player in Fremantle's eighth straight win over the West Coast Eagles.
