= Rachel Kearns =

Irish footballer (born 1997)

- Born: 15 June 1997 (age 29)
Association football career
- Height: 1.67 m (5 ft 6 in)
- Position: Striker
Youth career
- Casltebar Celtic
Senior career*
Years	Team	Apps	(Gls)
2013–2016	Casltebar Celtic	27	(13)
2018–2021	Galway	8	(6)
2025	Galway United	5	(0)
International career^{‡}
2016–2017	Republic of Ireland U19	3	(0)
- * Club domestic league appearances and goals as of 4 April 2026 ‡ National team caps and goals as of 4 April 2026
Australian rules football career
Personal information
- Original team: County Mayo (LGFA)
- Debut: Round 1, 2022 (S6), Geelong vs. North Melbourne, at Arden Street Oval
- Position: Medium defender
Club information
- Current club: Geelong
- Number: 22
Playing career^{1}
Years	Club	Games (Goals)
2022 (S6)–	Geelong	46 (6)
International team honours^{2}
Years	Team	Games (Goals)
2026	Ireland	1 (0)
- ^{1} Playing statistics correct to the end of 2025.^{2} Representative statistics correct as of 2026.

Rachel Kearns (born 15 June 1997) is a professional Australian rules footballer who plays for Geelong in the AFL Women's (AFLW).

During the AFLW off-seasons, Kearns returns to her home country of Ireland where she is a dual-code athlete of association football and Gaelic football. She represents County Mayo in the Ladies' Gaelic Football Association (LGFA) and most recently represented Galway United in the League of Ireland Women's Premier Division.

Kearns also pursued an Olympic path through boxing.

== Association football career ==
Following 27 appearances for Castlebar Celtic from the age of 16, Kearns was capped by the Republic of Ireland women's national under-19 football team. She played three games representing her country at youth level. She would later play for Galway in the teams last years, and she was named as the Women's National League player of the month for April of 2021 following a hat-trick against Cork City.

== Gaelic football career ==
As well as representing her county in the LGFA, Kearns played for Crossmolina Deel Rovers and the amalgamated MacHale Rovers in Mayo GAA.

Playing for County Mayo in the LGFA, Kearns won her second All-Star award, being selected in the 2021 TG4 All Star Team, following her selection in 2019.

== Australian rules career ==
Signed as a rookie ahead of 2022 AFL Women's season 6, Kearns made her debut in round one against North Melbourne at Arden Street Oval.

She finished in the top five of Geelong's best and fairest award in 2024.
