= Bláithín Mackin =

Irish footballer (born 1999)

Personal information
- Born: 20 January 1999 (age 27); Northern Ireland
- Original team: County Armagh (LGFA)
- Debut: Round 4, 2022 (S7), Melbourne vs. Brisbane, at Casey Fields
- Height: 181 cm (5 ft 11 in)
- Position: Midfielder

Club information
- Current club: Melbourne
- Number: 31

Playing career^{1}
| Years | Club | Games (Goals) |
| 2022 (S7)– | Melbourne | 36 (7) |
- ^{1} Playing statistics correct to the end of 2025.

Career highlights
- AFLW premiership player: 2022 (S7)

Bláithín Mackin (born 20 January 1999) is an Irish player of Australian rules football who plays for Melbourne in the AFL Women's (AFLW). Born in Northern Ireland, she hails from County Armagh in the Ladies' Gaelic Football Association.

She is the sister of "triple-code" footballer Aimee Mackin.

== AFL Women's career ==
After signing to Melbourne in the AFL Women's prior to the 2022 season 7, Mackin quickly became an important part of the Demons' team. After her round four debut against Brisbane, Mackin played ten games in her debut year including the Grand Final win, becoming a premiership player in her debut season.

Prior to the 2026 AFL Women's season, Mackin was placed on Melbourne's inactive list as she returned home to play Gaelic football in Ireland.
