= Aoibhin Cleary =

Australian football player

Aoibhin Cleary (born 29 April 1999) is a Ladies' Gaelic football and Australian rules football player. Cleary was the captain of the Meath team that lost the 2021 All-Ireland Senior Ladies' Football Championship final to Dublin. Cleary was the 40th Irish woman to play in AFL Women's.
