= Amy Gavin Mangan =

Irish footballer (born 1999)

Personal information
- Born: 20 January 1999 (age 27); Republic of Ireland
- Original team: Offaly (GAA)
- Draft: No. 43, 2024 national draft
- Debut: Round 2, 2025, North Melbourne vs. Port Adelaide, at Arden Street Oval
- Height: 171 cm (5 ft 7 in)
- Position: Forward

Club information
- Current club: North Melbourne
- Number: 21

Playing career^{1}
Years	Club	Games (Goals)
2025–	North Melbourne	19 (4)

International team honours^{2}
Years	Team	Games (Goals)
2026	Ireland	1 (0)
- ^{1} Playing statistics correct to the end of 2026 regular season.^{2} Representative statistics correct as of 2026.

Amy Gavin Mangan (born 20 January 1999) is an Irish Australian rules footballer who plays for North Melbourne in the AFL Women's (AFLW). She is also a gaelic footballer hailing from County Offaly.

== Australian football career ==
With the 43rd overall pick in the 2024 national draft, Gavin Mangan joined North Melbourne prior to the 2025 AFL Women's season.

She made her debut early in the Kangaroo's historic season, featuring in the round two win against Port Adelaide and kicking a memorable goal on debut. She played seven matches in her maiden season in Australia as North Melbourne went undefeated to become premiers, however, Gavin Mangan was left out of the team that defeated Brisbane in the 2025 Grand Final. She was listed as an emergency in the Grand Final squad.

Ahead of the 2026 season, Gavin Mangan was named in the Irish representative side to take on Australia in the 2026 AFL Women's Australia v Ireland match alongside three Irish North Melbourne teammates.
