= Erika O'Shea =

Irish footballer (born 2002)

Personal information
- Full name: Erika O'Shea
- Born: 26 June 2002 (age 24); County Cork, Ireland
- Original teams: Macroom (Cork GAA); Cork (LGFA)
- Debut: Round 1, 2022 (S7), North Melbourne vs. Gold Coast, at Bellerive Oval
- Height: 181 cm (5 ft 11 in)
- Position: Medium defender

Club information
- Current club: North Melbourne
- Number: 14

Playing career^{1}
Years	Club	Games (Goals)
2022 (S7)–	North Melbourne	50 (1)

International team honours^{2}
Years	Team	Games (Goals)
2026	Ireland	1 (0)
- ^{1} Playing statistics correct to the end of 2025.^{2} Representative statistics correct as of 2026.

Career highlights
- 2× AFLW premiership player: 2024, 2025

Erika O'Shea (born 26 June 2002) is an Australian rules footballer who plays for the North Melbourne Football Club in the AFL Women's (AFLW). Originally from Macroom in County Cork, previously played Ladies' Gaelic football for Macroom and the Cork county ladies' football team.

== AFL Women's career ==
O'Shea signed for AFL Women's club North Melbourne ahead of the seventh season in 2022. She became the youngest Irish player in the history of the competition when she made her debut in the round one match against Gold Coast. She was recognised for her contributions in her first season, earning North Melbourne's Best Young Player award.

O'Shea played her 50th league game in the 2025 Grand Final, and became a two-time premiership player when the Kangaroos defeated Brisbane for the second consecutive year.
