= Kate Flood =

Australian rules footballer (born 1992)

Personal information
- Born: 14 August 1992 (age 34)
- Original teams: Louth, GAA
- Draft: International Rookie selection, 2019
- Debut: Round 1, 2020, Fremantle vs. Geelong, at Fremantle Oval
- Height: 175 cm (5 ft 9 in)
- Position: Midfielder

Playing career^{1}
Years	Club	Games (Goals)
2019–2020	Fremantle	7 (5)
- ^{1} Playing statistics correct to the end of 2020 season.

Kate Flood (born 14 August 1992) is a former captain of the Louth Gaelic football team who also played Australian rules football for the Fremantle Football Club in the AFL Women's (AFLW). In August 2020, Flood retired from Australian rules football.

== Association football ==
Flood also played soccer, representing Dundalk and the Republic of Ireland women's national under-19 football team in the early part of her career. She joined Raheny United before the Women's National League (WNL) was formed in 2011 and represented the club in the competition's first season.

In 2015, she was part of the Newry City team which won the Northern Ireland Women's Premier League, with a last-minute winner over Mid-Ulster Ladies.
