= Laura Duryea =

Women's Australian rules footballer

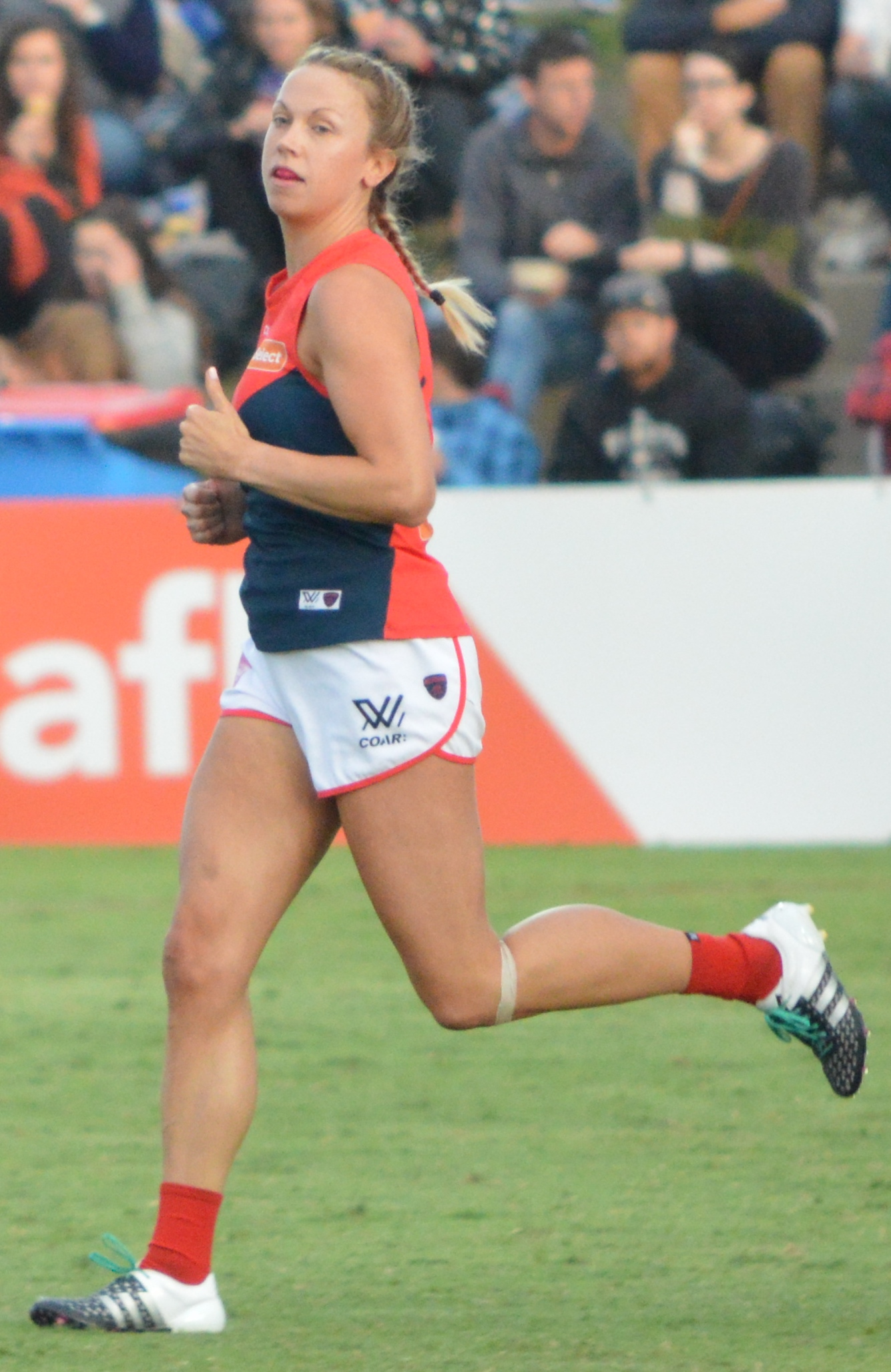

Personal information
- Born: 14 December 1983 (age 42); Ireland
- Height: 180 cm (5 ft 11 in)
- Position: Defender

Playing career^{1}
Years	Club	Games (Goals)
2008–2009	Melbourne University	
2009–	Diamond Creek	
2016–2018	Melbourne	11 (0)

Representative team honours^{2}
Years	Team	Games (Goals)
- Victoria Country

International team honours^{2}
2011–2017	Ireland	
- ^{1} Playing statistics correct to the end of 2018.^{2} Representative statistics correct as of 2017.

Career highlights
- Member of the Diamond Creek team that won the 2012 VFWL Premiership Cup; Member of the Ireland teams that won the 2011 and 2017 Australian Football International Cups.

Laura Duryea (born 14 December 1983), previously known as Laura Corrigan and also referred to as Laura Corrigan Duryea, is a women's Australian rules footballer best known for her professional career with Melbourne in the AFLW and for representing Ireland multiple times in the Australian Football International Cup.

She originally played senior ladies' Gaelic football for Cavan and Victoria however decided to switch preferring the increased physicality of Australian Football, and wore the number at Melbourne of the late Irish Hall of Famer Jim Stynes.

== Early years, family and education ==
Duryea is originally from Ireland. She was raised in the Drumlane, Belturbet and Milltown area of County Cavan. She is the daughter of Ian Corrigan, an Irish country singer. Her father and brothers played Gaelic football for Drumlane. She was educated at Loreto College, Cavan and RMIT.

In 2008, Duryea arrived in St Kilda, Victoria while travelling. She ended up staying in the Melbourne area and eventually settled in Rosebud, Mornington Peninsula. In 2016, she married Richard Duryea.

== Gaelic football ==
Laura Duryea
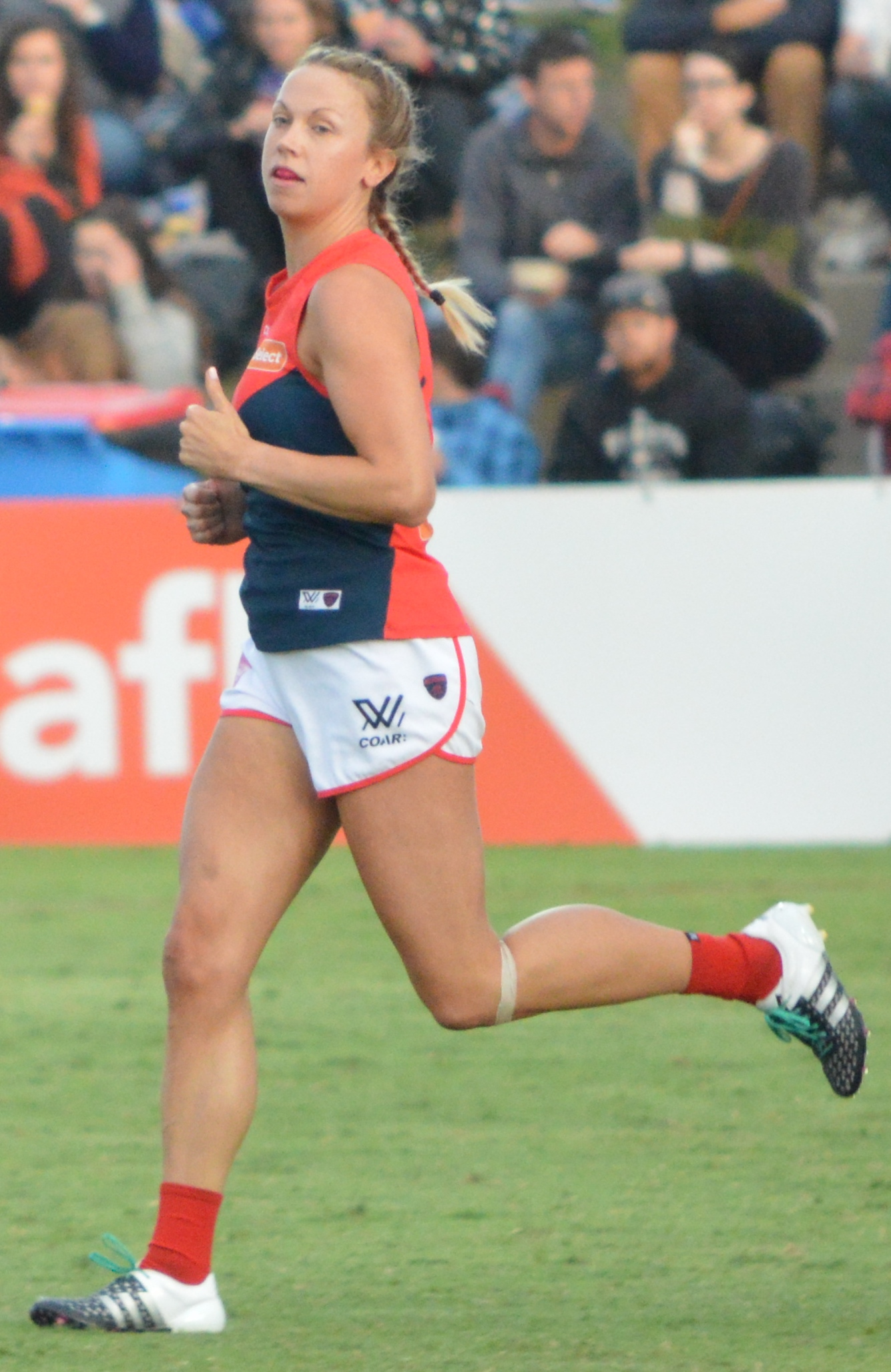

Sport
- Sport: Ladies' Gaelic football
- Position: Midfielder
Clubs
- Years: Club
- Drumlane; Erne Gaels; Sinn Féin (Melbourne)
Inter-county
- Years: County
- 20xx–2007 2006 2016 ?: Cavan → Underdogs; Victoria

=== Clubs ===
While living in County Cavan, Duryea played for Drumlane and Erne Gaels. After moving to Melbourne she played for Sinn Féin.

=== Inter-county ===
Duryea has also played senior ladies' Gaelic football for Cavan and Victoria. In 2006 Duryea played for a representative team known as the Underdogs while participating in the TG4 reality show of the same name. During the show, the Underdogs played against Meath, Laois and Cork.

== Australian rules football ==
=== VWFL ===
In 2008 while playing ladies' Gaelic football at Gaelic Park in Keysborough, an opponent suggested Duryea should try women's Australian rules football and invited her to a training session with the VWFL team, Melbourne University. After a season with Melbourne University, Duryea switched to Diamond Creek. She subsequently played for Diamond Creek in seven VWFL Premier Division grand finals, helping them win the 2012 VFWL Premiership Cup.

=== Melbourne ===
In 2016 Duryea was recruited to play for Melbourne in the AFLW. On 5 February 2017 she made her AFLW debut against Brisbane at Casey Fields. In the opening game of the 2018 season she played for Melbourne against Cora Staunton, making her debut for Greater Western Sydney. Duryea and Staunton were the first and second Irish players to feature in the AFLW.

=== Ireland ===
Duryea has played for Ireland in the Australian Football International Cup, helping Ireland win the cup in both 2011 and 2017.

Tournaments	Place
2011 Australian Football International Cup	1st
2014 Australian Football International Cup	2nd
2017 Australian Football International Cup	1st

== Teacher ==
Duryea is a primary school teacher. She taught PE in Dublin before emigrating to Australia. She has worked as teacher at Montmorency South Primary School and Dromana Primary School.

== Honours ==
Diamond Creek

- VFWL Premiership Cup
  - Winners: 2012: 1
  - Runner up: ??? : 6

Ireland

- Australian Football International Cup
  - Winners: 2011, 2017: 2
  - Runner up: 2014: 1
  - Women's World Team selection: 2011, 2014, 2017
