= Vikki Wall =

Multi-code female Irish footballer

Personal information
- Born: 2 May 1998 (age 28)

Sport
- Sport: Ladies' Gaelic football
Inter-county
- Years: County
- Meath
Inter-county titles
- All-Irelands: 2

Vikki Wall (born 2 May 1998) is an Irish sportswoman. She has played ladies' Gaelic football for Meath GAA, AFL Women’s for North Melbourne Football Club and Rugby sevens for Ireland.

== Early life ==
From Dunboyne in County Meath, she attended school at Gaelscoil Thulach na nÓg in Dunboyne.

== Gaelic football ==
In 2020, she was named TG4 Intermediate Players' Player of the Year. Wall was an All-Ireland Championship winner in Gaelic Athletic Association with Meath GAA in 2021. She won an all star & overall Ladies Gaelic Football player of the year 2021. She was a RTÉ Sports Person of the Year nominee in December 2021. She was an All-Ireland Championship winner for a second time in 2022. She continuing playing GAA for Meath in 2023 after playing AFL Women's league with North Melbourne in 2022.

== Australian rules football ==
Vikki Wall

Personal information
- Born: 2 May 1998 (age 28)
- Original team: North Melbourne
- Debut: 2022, North Melbourne
- Position: Forward

Playing career^{1}
Years	Club	Games (Goals)
2022 (S7)–	North Melbourne	27 (18)

International team honours^{2}
Years	Team	Games (Goals)
2026	Ireland	1 (0)
- ^{1} Playing statistics correct to the end of 2024 season.^{2} Representative statistics correct as of 2026.

Career highlights
- 2× AFLW premiership player: 2024, 2025

She played in the AFL Women's league with North Melbourne during 2022 season 7.

It didn't take long for Wall to display her combative and athletic prowess on a football field. Wall adapted smoothly to the Aussie rules style and was able to bring her unique blend of speed and strength to the forefront, which quickly became a problem for opposition defenders attempting to lessen her impact.

Playing all 13 games in her debut campaign, the Irishwoman booted six goals in total, including two critical ones against the Cats in difficult conditions in Round 4. Impressively, Wall was also able to consistently rake in contested grabs around the ground, making her a threat at ground level and aerially.

== Statistics ==
Updated to the end of the 2024 season.

Legend
G	Goals	K	Kicks	D	Disposals	T	Tackles
B	Behinds	H	Handballs	M	Marks
#	Played in that season's premiership team

Season	Team	No.	Games	Totals							Averages (per game)							Votes
Season	Team	No.	Games	G	B	K	H	D	M	T	G	B	K	H	D	M	T	Votes
2022 (S7)	North Melbourne	13	13	6	7	74	29	103	25	52	0.5	0.5	5.7	2.2	7.9	1.9	4.0	
2024^{#}	North Melbourne	3	14	12	8	65	56	121	13	66	0.9	0.6	4.6	4.0	8.6	0.9	4.7	
Career			27	18	15	139	85	224	38	118	0.7	0.6	5.1	3.1	8.3	1.4	4.4	

== Rugby union ==
Vikki Wall
- Born: 2 April 1998 (age 28)
- School: Gaelscoil Thulach na nÓg
- University: Dublin City University

Rugby union career
National sevens team
Years	Team	Comps
2024–	Ireland	

In July 2023, an agreement was reached with the Irish Rugby Football Union for Wall to play rugby sevens. In August 2023, she joined up with the Ireland women's national rugby sevens team for the first time. She made her senior debut for Ireland in Sevens Rugby in January 2024 at the SVNS Series tournament in Perth, Western Australia in an Irish victory over Japan. The Irish team claimed their first World Series tournament victory at the event.

== Personal life ==
Wall competed a master's degree in Digital Marketing at Dublin City University in 2021.
