= 2010 O'Byrne Cup =

Tournament details
- Province: Leinster
- Year: 2010
- Trophy: O'Byrne Cup

Winners
- Champions: DCU (1st win)
- Manager: Niall Moyna
- Captain: Paddy Andrews

The 2010 O'Byrne Cup was a Gaelic football competition played by the teams of Leinster GAA. The competition differs from the Leinster Senior Football Championship as it also features further education colleges and the winning team does not progress to another tournament at All-Ireland level. Last year's winners of the O'Byrne Cup were Louth. The O'Byrne Cup was due to begin on 6 January 2010; however, due to Arctic conditions in the Leinster region of Ireland, the Leinster council decided to postpone all games until 16 January.

== Rule changes ==
This competition was the first Leinster senior football competition to include the 2010 modifications to the rules of the game. In matches in this competition, players could only use a fist pass rather than having the option of using an open-handed hand pass, which was the case previously. An experimental 'mark' rule was also introduced, where a player catching a kick-out from the goalkeeper between the 45-metre lines was awarded a free kick. There were also changes in the location where penalties and kickouts were taken, and the definition of what constituted a 'bounce' during solo runs.

== O'Byrne Cup ==
First round 16/17 January 2010
Laois	2-09
D.I.T.	1-09
Kildare	0-16
U.C.D.	1-11
Carlow	0-08
A.I.T	0-12
Wicklow	0-11
Louth	2-18
Dublin	2-10
Wexford	0-08
Longford	0-13
Meath	2-13
Kilkenny	0-06
Offaly	1-23
Westmeath	0-08
D.C.U.	0-18

Quarter-finals; 24 January 2010
Laois	0-08
Kildare	0-11
A.I.T.	1-07
Louth	0-18
Dublin	1-09
Meath	1-10
Offaly	0-08
D.C.U.	0-16

Semi-finals; 31 January 2010
Kildare	0-14
Louth	1-16
Meath	0-13
DCU	0-16

Final; 21 February 2010
Louth	0-17
DCU	1-15

=== First round ===
The eight winning teams from the first round of the O'Byrne Cup went on to qualify for the quarter-finals of the tournament. The losers of the first round went on to the O'Byrne Shield quarter finals.

16 January 2010

Laois	2-09 - 1-09	D.I.T
MJ Tierney 1-4, C Og Greene 1-0, B Sheehan 0-2, R Stapleton, B Quigley, P McMahon 0-1 each.	Report	D Connelly 1-4 (1-0pen,0-4f), M Reilly 0-3, N Coughlan 0-2 (0-1f).

Graiguecullen
Referee: N. Ward (Westmeath)
17 January 2010

Kildare	0-16 - 1-11	U.C.D.
R Kelly 0-8 (5f), R Sweeney 0-4 (4f), D Earley 0-2, D Whyte, K Donnelly 0-1 each.	Report	F McGee 1-4 (0-2f), C Lyng 0-3 (2f), D O'Connor 0-2, D O'Callaghan, M McGowan 0-1 each.

St Conleth's Park, Newbridge
Referee: F. Kelly (Longford)
17 January 2010

Carlow	0-08 - 0-12	A.I.T.
J Kavanagh 0-4 (3f), S Rea 0-2 (2f), J J Smith, E O'Toole 0-1 each.	Report	R Galligan 0-5 (2f), D Reilly, P Bannon (1f) 0-2 each, F Burke, D Egan, J Reynolds 0-1 each.

Dr Cullen Park, Carlow
Referee: D. Maher (Westmeath)
17 January 2010

Wicklow	0-11 - 2-18	Louth
C Jones 0-4 (0-3f), S Furlong 0-3 (0-2f), P Earls, D Odlum, N Gaffney, T Hannon ('45') 0-1 each.	Report	B White 1-6 (0-6 f), JP Rooney 1-2, C Judge 0-3, D Crilly, P Keenan 0-2 each, A McDonnell, S Fitzpatrick, R Finnegan 0-1 each.

Baltinglass
Referee: B. Hickey (Kildare)
17 January 2010

Dublin	2-10 - 0-08	Wexford
B McManamon 0-4; K McManamon (1-0 pen); B Kelly (1-0 pen) 1-1 each; D Rock 0-2 (01f); E O'Gara, M McAuley 0-1 each.	Report	B Brosnan 0-6 (4f); R Barry, D Waters 0-1 each.

Parnell Park, Dublin
Referee: D. Gavin (Offaly)
17 January 2010

Longford	0-13 - 2-13	Meath
B Kavanagh 0-4 (0-3f, 0-1 '45), J Martin 0-3 (0-1f), K Mulligan 0-2, B McElvaney, D Morgan, D Reilly, R McGoldrick 0-1 each.	Report	J Sheridan, J Queeney 1-3 each, P Byrne 0-2, C McGuinness, G Reilly, M Ward, E Gilsenan, S Kenny 0-1 each.

Ballymahon, Longford
Referee: S. Carroll (Westmeath)
17 January 2010

Kilkenny	0-06 - 1-23	Offaly
G Lalor 0-4 (3f), JJ Grace, P Donnelly 0-1 each.	Report	N McNamee, P Smart (1f), K Casey (2f) 0-5 each, S Ryan 1-0, K Williamson 0-4 (2f), C McManus, N Smith, P Sullivan, S Brady 0-1 each.

Thomastown, Kilkenny
Referee: P. Keogh (Carlow)
17 January 2010

Westmeath	0-08 - 0-18	D.C.U.
J Durkan 0-4 (0-3f), T McDaniel 0-2 (1f), P Greville (1f), M Ennis 0-1 each.	Report	D Shine (0-2f), S Johnston 0-3 each, N Collins, S Shortall, P Byrne, P Andrews 0-2 each, D Sheridan, J Cooper, D Kelly, W Mulhall 0-1 each.

St. Lomans, Mullingar
Referee: F. Barry (Kildare)

=== Quarter-finals ===
The quarter finals were played on the weekend of 24 January 2010. One match (Dublin vs Meath) ended in a draw, and a replay was held on 27 January. Another match (Laois vs Kildare) was a source of controversy, when a brawl which occurred during the match led to a total of seven players being sent off. A subsequent investigation into the incident led to 4 Laois players and 2 Kildare players receiving suspensions from the game for between four and eight weeks. The affected players would be ineligible to play in the rest of the O'Byrne Cup, as well as any National Football League matches scheduled to be played during the period of suspension.

24 January 2010

Laois	0-08 - 0-11	Kildare
M J Tierney 0-8 (7f, 1 '45).	Report	R Kelly 0-4 (3f), J Doyle 0-3 (3f), D Whyte 0-2, M O'Flaherty, D Earley 0-1 each.

O'Moore Park, Portlaoise
Referee: S. Doyle (Wexford)
24 January 2010

A.I.T.	1-07 - 0-18	Louth
R Galligan 0-5 (0-5f), B Connors 1-1, M Matthews, J Reynolds 0-1 each.	Report	C Judge 0-5 (0-4fs), P Keenan 0-4, A McDonnell, JP Rooney, B White (0-1f), R Greene, A Hoey, M Brennan, D Clarke, D Crilly, D Maguire 0-1 each.

Drogheda Park, Drogheda
Referee: A. Lagrue (Kildare)
24 January 2010

Dublin	2-15 - 1-18	Meath
K McManamon 2-0, B Brogan 0-3 (0-1f), D Henry, D Kelly 0-2 each, J Brogan, T Diamond, B Kelly (0-1f), D Rock, M McAuley, A Hubbard, K Bonner, C Daly 0-1 each.	Report	J Queeney 0-7 (0-2f), J Sheridan 1-2 (0-1 '45), D Bray (0-2f), N Mooney 0-3 each, S Bray 0-2, G Reilly 0-1.

Parnell Park, Dublin
Referee: E. Kinsella (Laois)
24 January 2010

Offaly	0-08 - 0-16	D.C.U.
K Casey 0-3 (0-1 '45), N McNamee, A Lynam, P Sullivan, R Brady, R Connor 0-1 each.	Report	R Flanagan 0-4 (0-4f), D Shine 0-3 (0-2f), D Kelly, S Johnston 0-2 each, K Nolan, J Cooper, B Sheridan, P Byrne (0-1f), C Cregg 0-1 each.

O'Connor Park, Tullamore
Referee: E. Craul (Wicklow)
27 January 2010
Replay

Meath	1-10 - 1-09	Dublin
J Queeney 1-3 (0-2f), D Bray 0-3 (0-2f), C McGuinness, B Meade, O Lewis, J Sheridan 0-1 each.	Report	B Brogan 1-5 (0-2f), E Fennell 0-2, K Bonner, D Kelly 0-1 each.

Páirc Tailteann, Navan
Referee: Pat Fox (Westmeath)

=== Semi-finals ===
31 January 2010

Kildare	0-14 - 1-16	Louth
K Ennis 0-3 (1f); R Walsh, D Earley, R Kelly 0-2 each; E Bolton, P O'Neill, K Cribbin, A Rainbow, J Kavanagh 0-1 each.	Report	C Judge 0-4 (0-4f); D Byrne 1-1; B White 0-3 (2f); R Carroll, A McDonnell, JP Rooney (1f) 0-2 each, R Finnegan, S Lennon 0-1 each.

St Conleth's Park, Newbridge
Referee: C. Reilly (Meath)
31 January 2010

Meath	0-13 - 0-16	DCU
C Ward 0-8 (0-5f, 0-1 '45), O Lewis 0-2, S Kennedy, N Mooney, S Bray 0-1 each.	Report	S Roche 0-8 (0-7f), P Andrews, C Cregg 0-2 each, S Shortall, C Rafferty, R Cullivan (0-1f), B Sheridan (0-1f) 0-1 each.

Páirc Tailteann, Navan
Referee: D. Fahy (Longford)

=== Final ===
21 February 2010	Louth	0-17 - 1-15	DCU	St Brigid's Park, Dundalk
	B. White 0-5 (2f, 2'45), S. Lennon, M. Brennan 0-3 each, C. Judge 0-2 (2f), M. Fanning, S. Fitzpatrick, D. Byrne, D. Clarke (f) 0-1 each		S. Roche 0-6 (3f), W. Mulhall 1-1, D. Shine 0-4 (2f), B. Sheridan, M. Lyng, P. Byrne, B. Cullen 0-1 each	Referee: J. Curley (Meath)

GK	1	Neil Gallagher (Cooley Kickhams)
RCB	2	Pádraig Rath (Dreadnots)
FB	3	Dessie Finnegan (St Patrick's)
LCB	4	Ronan Greene (Naomh Malachi)
RHB	5	Aaron Hoey (St Bride's)
CHB	6	Mick Fanning (Naomh Máirtín)
LHB	7	Stephen Fitzpatrick (Clan na Gael)
MF	8	Seán O'Neill (Cooley Kickhams)
MF	9	Brian White (Cooley Kickhams)
RHF	10	Adrian Reid (Mattock Rangers)
CHF	11	Mark Brennan (Mattock Rangers)
LHF	12	Derek Crilly (Dundalk Gaels)
RCF	13	Colm Judge (Newtown Blues)
FF	14	Shane Lennon (Kilkerley Emmets)
LCF	15	JP Rooney (Naomh Máirtín)
Substitutes:
	16	Declan Byrne (St Mochta's) for Hoey
	17	Darren Clarke (St Sylvester's, Dublin) for Reid
	18	Liam Shevlin (Dreadnots) for Greene

GK	1	Michael Boyle (Donegal)
RCB	2	Simon Shortall (Laois)
FB	3	Philly McMahon (Dublin)
LCB	4	Neil Collins (Roscommon)
RHB	5	Hugh Gill (Dublin)
CHB	6	Bryan Cullen (Dublin)
LHB	7	Pauric Howard (Meath)
MF	8	Ray Cullivan (Cavan)
MF	9	Conor Rafferty (Louth)
RHF	10	Brian Sheridan (Meath)
CHF	11	Micheál Lyng (Cavan)
LHF	12	Paddy Byrne (Wicklow)
RCF	13	Shane Roche (Wexford)
FF	14	Donal Shine (Roscommon)
LCF	15	Willie Mulhall (Offaly)
Substitutes:
	16	Eoin Culligan (Dublin) for Shortall
	17	Kevin Nolan (Dublin) for Howard
	18	Paddy Andrews (Dublin) for Mulhall
	19	Kieran Gavin (Westmeath) for Byrne
	20	Craig Dunleavy (Dublin) for Rafferty

== O'Byrne Shield ==
The O'Byrne Shield consisted of the 8 losing teams from the first round of the O'Byrne Cup.

Quarter-finals; 22/24 January 2010		Semi-finals; 31 January 2010		Final; 28 February 2010
D.I.T.	0-14
U.C.D.	2-07	D.I.T.	0-10
Carlow	2-13	Carlow	3-07
Wicklow	2-10			Carlow	1-15
Wexford	1-10			Wexford	2-08
Longford	0-12	Wexford	1-11
Kilkenny	0-06	Westmeath	0-08
Westmeath	2-17

=== Quarter-finals ===
22 January 2010

D.I.T.	0-14 - 2-07	U.C.D.
D Connolly 0-6 (0-3f, 0-1 '45'), E Reilly 0-3, J Fogarty 0-2 (0-1f), N Coughlan, R Tierney, J Coughlan 0-1 each.	Report	B O'Rorke 0-4 (0-1f), D O'Connor, N Murray 1-0 each, D St Ledger 0-2, P Brady 0-1.

Ringsend, Dublin
Referee: D. Gough (Meath)
24 January 2010

Carlow	2-13 - 1-10	Wicklow
B Murphy 1-2, J Kavanagh 0-4 (4f), E McCormack 0-3 (3f), E O'Toole 1-0, S Gannon, A Curran, T Bolger, S Rea (f) 0-1 each.	Report	T Hannon 0-6 (6f), S Furlong 1-2, (0-2f), L Glynn, P Cunningham 0-1 each.

Dr. Cullen Park, Carlow
Referee: F. Barry (Kildare)
24 January 2010

Wexford	1-10 - 0-12	Longford
B Brosnan 1-5 (1-3f, 1 '45'), A Morrissey 0-3; D Kinsella, A Flynn 0-1 each.	Report	J Martin 0-6 (0-5f), B Kavanagh 0-5 (0-3f), K Mulligan 0-1.

Enniscorthy
Referee: G. McCormack (Dublin)
24 January 2010

Kilkenny	0-06 - 2-17	Westmeath
G Lalor 0-5, M Farrell 0-1.	Report	D Glennon 1-6 (0-3f), R Greville 0-5 (0-2f), G Hoey 1-1, D Gilsenan (0-1f), J Smyth (0-1f) 0-2 each, A Finnan 0-1.

Ballyragget
Referee: B. Hickey (Kildare)

=== Semi-finals ===
31 January 2010

D.I.T.	0-10 - 3-07	Carlow
D Connolly 0-5 (0-4f, 0-1 '45'), D Flynn, K McLoughlin, J McGrath, E O'Reilly, K Dias 0-1 each.	Report	S Rea 3-3 (1-2f, 1-0 p), J Kavanagh, A Curran, S Gannon, A Kelly 0-1 each.

Dr. Cullen Park, Carlow
Referee: J. Curley (Meath)
31 January 2010

Wexford	1-11 - 0-08	Westmeath
B Brosnan 1-6 (0-3f, 0-1 '45), P Byrne 0-3, A Doyle, P Naughter 0-1 each.	Report	D Glennon 0-3 (0-2f), J Durcan 0-2 (0-1f), S Bracken, P Greville (f), G Hoey 0-1 each.

Gorey
Referee: B. O'Shea (Dublin)

=== Final ===
28 February 2010

Carlow	1-15 - 2-08	Wexford
J Kavanagh 1-4 (0-2f), S Rea 0-4 (0-2f, 0-1 '45'), P Cashin 0-2, J Murphy, K Doyle, S Gannon, E McCormack, W Minchin 0-1 each.		B Brosnan 1-3 (0-1f), A Flynn 1-1, C Deely 0-2, E Bradley, C Byrne 0-1 each.

Tinryland
Referee: P. Kneel (Louth)

== See also ==
- 2010 Dr McKenna Cup
