= 2010 All-Ireland Senior Ladies' Football Championship final =

2010 All-Ireland Senior Ladies' Football Final
- Event: 2010 All-Ireland Senior Ladies' Football Championship
Dublin	Tyrone
3–16	0–9
- Dublin win first All-Ireland title
- Date: 26 September 2010
- Venue: Croke Park, Dublin
- Player of the Match: Sinéad Aherne
- Referee: K Delahunty (Tipperary)
- Attendance: 21,750

The 2010 All-Ireland Senior Ladies' Football Championship final featured Dublin and Tyrone. This was Dublin's fourth final and Tyrone's first. On the three previous occasions Dublin had reached the final in 2003, 2004 and 2009, they had finished as runners-up. In 2010 they would win their first title. On their way to the final, Tyrone had knocked out Cork in the quarter-final, interrupting their monopoly of the All-Ireland for one year. However Tyrone proved to be no match for Dublin in the final. At half-time Dublin led by 2–8 to 0–5. With twenty minutes remaining, Dublin led by 16 points and that margin would separate the two teams at the finish. Sinéad Aherne scored 2–7 to claim the Player of the Match award.

== Match info ==
26 September 2010

Dublin	3–16; 0–9	Tyrone
Sinéad Aherne (2-7); Amy McGuinness (1-3); Siobhán McGrath (0-1); Elaine Kelly (0-2); Lyndsey Davey (0-2); Gemma Fay (0-1); Lindsay Peat (0-1)		Gemma Begley (0-4); Joline Donnelly (0-3); Cathy Donnelly (0-1); Nina Murphy (0-1)

Croke Park, Dublin
Attendance: 21,750
Referee: K Delahunty (Tipperary)

== Teams ==
Manager: Gerry McGill Team: 1 Clíodhna O'Connor; 2 Rachel Ruddy; 3 Avril Cluxton; 4 Maria Kavanagh; 5 Siobhán McGrath; 6 Sorcha Furlong; 7 Gemma Fay; 8 Denise Masterson (c); 9 Niamh McEvoy (Parnells) ^{[Note 1]} 10 Mary Nevin; 11 Amy McGuinness; 12 Lindsay Peat; 13 Lyndsey Davey; 14 Sinéad Aherne; 15 Elaine Kelly Substitutes: B. Finlay for Kelly (46); N. Hyland for Nevin (52); Noëlle Healy for McGuinness (56); Niamh McEvoy (St. Sylvester's) for Niamh McEvoy (57) ^{[Note 1]} C. Barrett for Fay (57)	Manager: Colm Donnelly Team: 1 Shannon Lynch; 2 Eimear Teague; 3 Maura Kelly; 4 Sinead McLaughlin; 5 Maria Donnelly; 6 Neamh Woods; 7 Lynda Donnelly; 8 Sarah Donnelly (c); 9 Shannon Quinn; 10 Cathy Donnelly; 11 Gemma Begley; 12 Aisling O'Kane; 13 Catriona McGahan; 14 Sarah Connolly; 15 Joline Donnelly Substitutes: Nina Murphy for Connolly (14); Rosin Rafferty for Teague (half-time); Orla O'Neill for McGahan (44); Marie Gallagher for M. Donnelly (44); Clare Scullion for O'Kane (56)

Notes

- ^1 The Dublin team featured two players named Niamh McEvoy. One played for Parnells and the other for St. Sylvesters.
