= Niamh McEvoy =

Niamh McEvoy may refer to:

- Niamh McEvoy (Parnells Gaelic footballer), Irish Gaelic football coach and former player
- Niamh McEvoy (footballer, born 1990), Irish Gaelic and Australian rules footballer
