= David Keenan (disambiguation) =

David Keenan (born 1971) is a Scottish author.

David Keenan may also refer to:

- David Keenan (Gaelic footballer), Gaelic footballer
- David Keenan (musician), Irish singer-songwriter
- Dave Keenan (born 1951), Canadian politician

== See also ==
- David A. Keene (born 1945), American political consultant, Presidential advisor, and newspaper editor
