= Clíodhna O'Connor =

Dublin senior ladies' footballer

Personal information
- Native name: Clíodhna Ní Conchobhair (Irish)
- Born: c. 1984 (age 41–42)
- Occupation: Gaelic games coach

Sport
- Sport: Ladies' Football
- Position: Goalkeeper
Clubs
- Years: Club
- 19xx–2015 2008–2009: Naomh Mearnóg → DCU
Inter-county
- Years: County
- 2002–2014: Dublin
Inter-county titles
- All-Irelands: 1
- All Stars: 2

Clíodhna O'Connor is a former senior Dublin ladies' footballer. She was a member of the Dublin team that won the All-Ireland Senior Ladies' Football Championship in 2010. She also played for Dublin in the 2003, 2004, 2009 and 2014 finals. She captained Dublin during the 2011 season. In 2004 and 2009 she was selected as an All Star and in 2010 she was included in the LGFA/TG4 Team of the Decade. She also played for the Ireland women's international rules football team. Since retiring as a player, O'Connor has coached Ladies' Gaelic football and hurling. She was a member of the coaching team at Cuala when they won the 2017 and 2018 All-Ireland Senior Club Hurling Championship Finals. In 2019 she became a member of the Dublin senior hurling team coaching staff.

== Biography ==
O'Connor is originally from Portmarnock. She attended University College Dublin where she gained a BA in English and Music. Between 2008 and 2009 she completed a master's degree in International Communications at Dublin City University and in 2015 she gained a Masters in Strength and Conditioning from St Mary's University, Twickenham.

== Playing career ==
=== Clubs ===
At club level, O'Connor played for Naomh Mearnóg.

=== Inter-county ===
Between 2002 and 2014 O'Connor was the first choice goalkeeper for the Dublin senior ladies' football team. She was a member of the Dublin team that won the All-Ireland Senior Ladies' Football Championship in 2010. She also played for Dublin in the 2003, 2004, 2009 and 2014 finals. In 2004 and 2009 she was selected as an All Star. In 2010 she was the only Dublin player to be named on the LGFA/TG4 Team of the Decade. She captained Dublin during the 2011 season, including when they won the Ladies' National Football League Division 2 title after defeating Meath in the final. In April 2017 O'Connor featured in an Laochra Gael episode which recalled and discussed her inter-county career. Valerie Mulcahy was among the contributors.

	All-Ireland Finals	Place	Opponent
1	2003	Runner up	Mayo
2	2004	Runner up	Galway
3	2009	Runner up	Cork
4	2010	Winners	Tyrone
5	2014	Runner up	Cork

=== International rules football ===
O'Connor was a member of the Ireland women's international rules football team that played against Australia in the 2006 Ladies' International Rules Series.

== Coach ==
O'Connor is a ladies' Gaelic football and hurling coach. While still an active player she worked for the Ladies' Gaelic Football Association. She was a member of Mattie Kenny's coaching team at Cuala when they won the 2017 and 2018 All-Ireland Senior Club Hurling Championship Finals. During 2018 she worked one-to-one as a free-taking coach with Tipperary hurler, Timmy Hammersley. He subsequently scored 0–12, including 0-9 from frees, as he helped Clonoulty-Rossmore win the 2018 Tipperary Senior Hurling Championship final. In 2019 she became a member Kenny's coaching team with the Dublin senior hurling team. O'Connor has also coached Gaelic football with Naomh Mearnóg and in 2019 announced plans to relaunch the adult ladies team after several seasons of inactivity.

== Honours ==
=== Naomh Mearnóg ===
- Dublin Ladies' Senior Football Championship

Runner-up (3): 2004, 2007, 2009

=== DCU ===
- O'Connor Cup

Winner (1): 2009

=== Dublin ===
- All-Ireland Senior Ladies' Football Championship

Winner (1): 2010
Runner-up (4): 2003, 2004, 2009, 2014

- Leinster Senior Ladies' Football Championship

Winner (9): 2003, 2004, 2005, 2008, 2009, 2010, 2012, 2013, 2014

- Ladies' NFL Div. 1

Runner-up (1): 2014

- Ladies' NFL Div. 2

Winner (2): 2007, 20011

=== Ireland ===
- International Rules Series

Winner (1): 2006

=== Individual ===
- All Stars

Winner (2): 2004, 2009

- LGFA/TG4 Team of the Decade

Winner (1): 2010

Sporting positions
Preceded by Denise Masterson	Dublin Senior Ladies' Football Captain; 2011	Succeeded by Gemma Fay
