= Davy Byrne =

Davy Byrne may refer to:

- Davy Byrne's pub, a public house in Dublin, made famous by its appearance in James Joyce's 1922 novel Ulysses
- Davy Byrne (1860–1938), Irish businessman and vintner, namesake of the above public house
- Davy Byrne (Dublin footballer) (born 1971/1972), Irish Gaelic football manager and player
- Davey Byrne (Dublin footballer) (initially referred to as Davy Byrne; born c. 1990s), Irish Gaelic football player
- David Byrne (Gaelic footballer) (alternatively referred to as Davy Byrne; born 1994), Irish Gaelic football player
- Davy Byrne (fl. 1980s), Irish Gaelic football manager and player, associated with Newtown Blues GAC
- Davy Byrne (fl. 1958), Irish Gaelic football player, represented Louth
- Davy Byrne (fl. 1984–85), Irish Gaelic football player, represented Monaghan

== See also ==
- David Byrne (disambiguation)
