= 2025 All-Ireland Senior Ladies' Football Championship final =

2025 All-Ireland Senior Ladies' Football Final
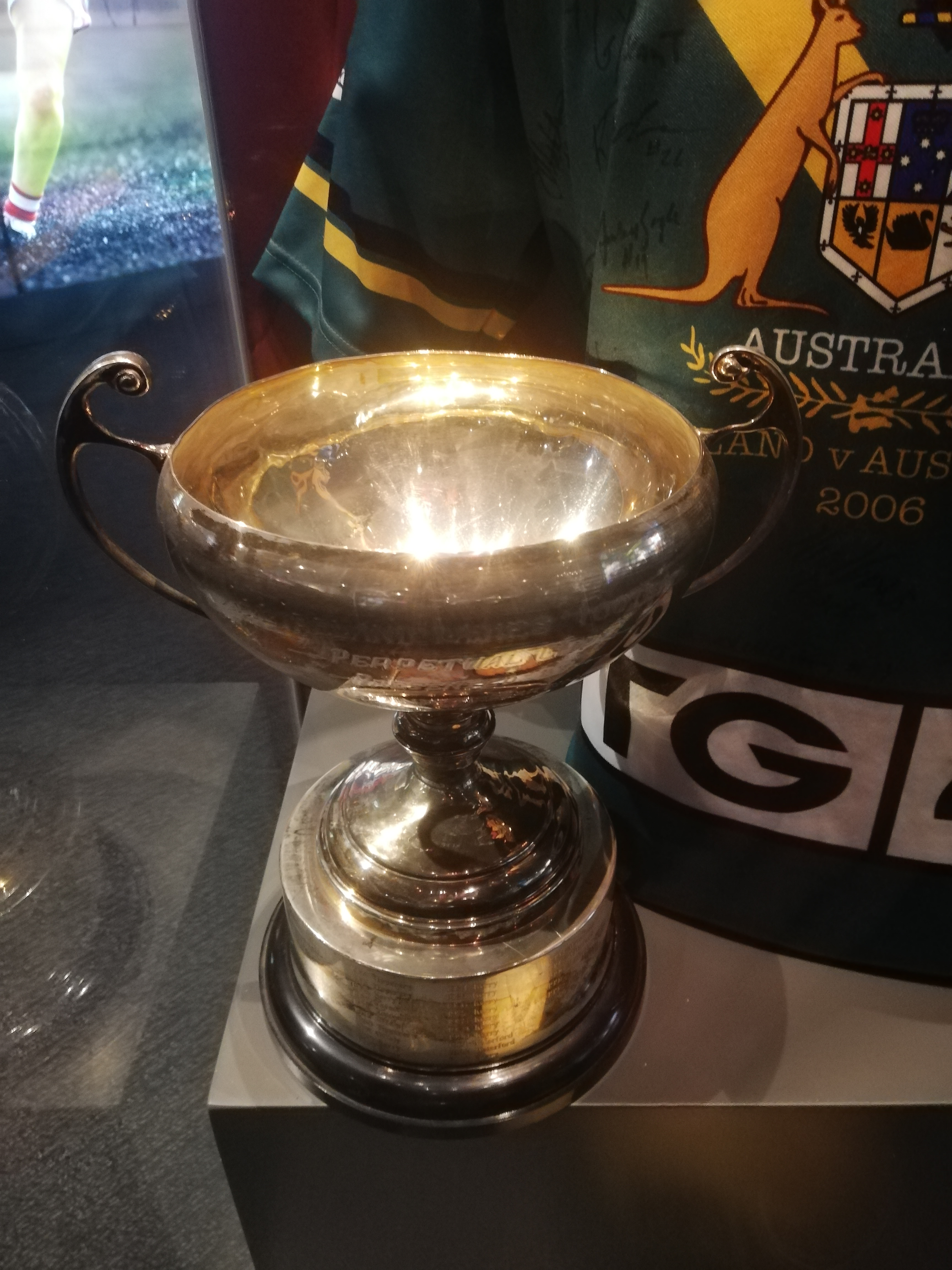
- Event: 2025 All-Ireland Senior Ladies' Football Championship
Meath	Dublin
0-10 (10)	2-16 (22)
- Dublin win the All-Ireland Senior Ladies' Football Championship
- Date: 3 August 2025
- Venue: Croke Park, Dublin
- Player of the Match: Orlagh Nolan (Dublin)
- Referee: Gus Chapman (Sligo)
- Attendance: 48,089
- Weather: 19 °C (66 °F), cloudy

The 2025 All-Ireland Senior Ladies' Football Championship final was the 51st All-Ireland Final and the deciding match of the 2025 All-Ireland Senior Ladies' Football Championship, an inter-county ladies' Gaelic football tournament for the county teams of Ireland.

Dublin were the winners, easily defeating Meath. The attendance was the third-highest for a ladies' final.

== Background ==
Meath were appearing in their third final, having defeated Dublin in 2021 and Kerry in 2022.

Dublin had won 6 All-Irelands, their first in 2010 and the most recent in 2023.

== Paths to the final ==
Meath
Round	Date	Opponent	Venue (H/A/N)	Result	Victory margin	Score	Ref
Leinster round-robin	19 April 2025	Dublin	Páirc Tailteann (H)	Loss	–7	1-6 to 2-10	
Leinster round-robin	4 May 2025	Kildare	St Conleth's Park (A)	Win	1	2-14 to 1-16	
Leinster final	11 May 2025	Dublin	Croke Park (N)	Loss	–4	1-12 to 2-13	
Group game	7 June 2025	Armagh	Páirc Tailteann (H)	Draw	0	3-8 to 2-11	
Group game	14 June 2025	Kildare	Hawkfield (A)	Win	3	0-7 to 0-4	
Quarter-final	6 July 2025	Tipperary	Páirc Tailteann (H)	Win	11	2-17 to 1-9	
Semi-final	19 July 2025	Kerry	O'Connor Park (N)	Win	6	2-12 to 1-9	

Dublin
Round	Date	Opponent	Venue (H/A/N)	Result	Victory margin	Score	Ref
Leinster round-robin	19 April 2025	Meath	Páirc Tailteann (A)	Win	7	2-10 to 1-6	
Leinster round-robin	27 April 2025	Kildare	St Conleth's Park (A)	Win	16	4-12 to 1-5	
Leinster final	11 May 2025	Meath	Croke Park (N)	Win	4	2-13 to 1-12	
Group game	8 June 2025	Waterford	Fraher Field (A)	Draw	0	1-13 to 1-13	
Group game	15 June 2025	Leitrim	Clann Mhuire, Naul (H)	Win	35	8-18 to 0-7	
Quarter-final	5 July 2025	Cork	Parnell Park (H)	Win	17	3–15 to 0-7	
Semi-final	19 July 2025	Galway	O'Connor Park (N)	Win	3	3-14 to 2–14 (a.e.t.)	

== Details ==
TG4

3 August 2025
16:15 IST (UTC+1)
All-Ireland Final

Report

Meath	0-10 (10) – (22) 2-16	Dublin
(HT: 0-4 – 2-9)
Pts: E Duggan 7 (6fs), A Cleary 1, C Smyth 1, V Wall 1		Gls: N Hetherton 1, N Owens 1 Pts: H Tyrrell 5 (3fs), C Rowe 4 (2fs), K Sullivan 4, N Hetherton 1, N Crowley 1, O Nolan 1

Croke Park, Dublin
Referee: Gus Chapman (Sligo)
Attendance: 48,089

== See also ==
- List of All-Ireland Senior Ladies' Football Championship finals
