= Lindsay Peat =

- Born: 5 November 1980 (age 46) Dublin, Ireland
- Height: 1.70 m (5 ft 7 in)
- Weight: 82 kg (181 lb)
- School: Mercy College, Beaumont
- University: Dublin City University
- Occupation(s): Clerical Officer, HSE

Rugby union career
- Position: Prop
Senior career
Years	Team	Apps	(Points)
2015–	Railway Union		
Provincial / State sides
Years	Team	Apps	(Points)
2016–	Leinster		
International career
Years	Team	Apps	(Points)
2015–	Ireland	33	(20)

Lindsay Peat is an Ireland women's rugby union international. Peat represented Ireland at the 2017 Women's Rugby World Cup. Peat is an all-round sportswoman. In addition to representing Ireland at women's rugby union, she has also played for the Republic of Ireland women's national association football team at U-18 level, captained the Ireland women's national basketball team and played senior Ladies' Gaelic football for Dublin. Between 2009 and 2014 she played in three All-Ireland finals. She was a member of the Dublin team that won the All-Ireland title in 2010 and she scored two goals in the 2014 final.

== Early years and education ==
Peat was raised in Artane, Dublin and attended Mercy College, Beaumont. Between 2011 and 2015 Peat attended Dublin City University where she gained a BSc in Physical Education and Biology.

== Association football ==
In 1998 Peat represented the Republic of Ireland women's national football team in qualifiers for the 1999 UEFA Women's Under-18 Championship, playing against England, the Netherlands and the Faroe Islands. Her teammates included future senior Republic of Ireland internationals Yvonne Tracy, Caroline Thorpe and Michelle Walsh as well as Elaine Harte, the future Cork senior ladies' football team goalkeeper.

== Basketball ==
Lindsay Peat
- Position: Point guard

Career history
- 2005–2014: DCU Mercy
- 2006–2010: Ireland

=== DCU Mercy ===
Peat began playing basketball at 13. Peat's mother, Marian, encouraged her to join a local basketball team in order to keep her occupied during the school summer holidays. Between 2005 and 2015 Peat played as a point guard for DCU Mercy, helping them win the 2007 and 2011 Basketball Ireland Women's Superleague titles. She also captained DCU Mercy to two National Cup wins in 2010 and 2011 and represented the team at intervarsity level. In addition to playing for DCU Mercy, Peat has also served the club in various other capacities including club captain, coach, administrator and chairperson.

=== Ireland international ===
Peat has represented the Ireland women's national basketball team at various age groups from U-16 to senior level. She made her debut for the senior team in 2006 and was co-captain during the 2009–10 season. She has also represented Ireland in EuroBasket Women qualifiers.

== Ladies' Gaelic football ==
Lindsay Peat
Sport
- Sport: Ladies' Gaelic football
- Position: Forward
Clubs
- Years: Club
- 200x–201x 200x–201x: Parnells GAA; DCU GAA
Inter-county
- Years: County
- 2009–2015: Dublin
Inter-county titles
- All-Irelands: 1

=== Club level ===
Peat played Ladies' Gaelic football at club level for both DCU GAA and Parnells GAA. She was a member the DCU GAA team that won three O'Connor Cup between 2009 and 2011. Peat scored 0–4 as she helped Parnells win the 2015 Dublin Ladies Intermediate Championship.

=== Inter-county ===
Peat represented Dublin at senior inter-county level and played in three All-Ireland finals, scoring 2–2. In 2009 she scored 0–1 as Dublin lost 1–9 to 0–11 to Cork. In 2010 she scored 0–1 as Dublin defeated Tyrone by 3–16 to 0–9. In 2014 she scored 2–0 as Dublin lost 2–13 to 2–12 to Cork.

== Rugby union ==
=== Club and province ===
Peat was encouraged to play women's rugby union by Graham Byrne, the Dundalk F.C. trainer. He had also worked with Peat as a basketball strength and conditioning coach. Byrne's cousin, Shirley Corcoran, was the director of rugby union at Railway Union and in 2015 Peat eventually accepted a long-standing invitation to try out for the Sandymount club. Peat has also represented Leinster in the IRFU Women's Interprovincial Series.

=== Ireland international ===
Within months of taking up women's rugby union, Peat was fast-tracked into the Ireland team by Tom Tierney. On 14 November 2015 she made her international debut when she came on as a replacement in an 8–3 defeat against England in an Autumn International at Twickenham Stoop. This was only Peat's eighth ever rugby union match.

She represented Ireland at the 2017 Women's Rugby World Cup and was voted Ireland Women's Player of the Year.

Peat has played for Ireland in the 2016, 2017, 2018, 2019, 2020 and 2021 Women's Six Nations.

== Personal life ==
Peat has works a clerical officer for the Health Service Executive. She is married and has one son, Barra,

She is a vocal advocate for gay rights and was an ambassador for the 2019 Union Cup when she revealed that she only came out to her family and friends when she was 30.

In 2020, the Irish Examiner newspaper named her ninth in the Top 10 Most Influential Women in Irish sport.

== Honours ==
=== Gaelic football ===
Dublin

- All-Ireland Senior Ladies' Football Championship
  - Winners: 2010
  - Runners Up: 2009, 2014

DCU GAA

- O'Connor Cup
  - Winners: 2009, 2010, 2011
  - Runners Up: 2015

Parnells GAA

- Dublin Ladies Intermediate Championship
  - Winners: 2015

=== Basketball ===
DCU Mercy

- Basketball Ireland Women's Superleague
  - Winners: 2007, 2011
- National Cup
  - Winners: 2010, 2011
- National Varsity Title
  - Winners: 2007, 2008, 2012, 2014

=== Rugby union ===
Individual

- Ireland Women's Player of the Year
  - Winner: 2017
