= Colin Forde (Gaelic footballer) =

Irish Gaelic footballer

Personal information
- Born: 1989 or 1990 Galway, Ireland
- Occupation: Physiotherapist

Sport
- Sport: Gaelic football
- Position: Right Corner Back
Club
- Years: Club
- 2007–2013: Killererin
Club titles
- Galway titles: 1
Inter-county
- Years: County
- 2011–2015: Galway

Colin Forde (born 1989 or 1990) is an Irish sportsperson who played Gaelic football with Killererin, and was a member of the Galway senior football team from 2011 to 2015.

At club level, Forde was a member of the Killererin team that won the 2010 Galway Senior Football Championship.

He was full-back on the Galway minor team that won the All-Ireland Minor Football Championship in 2007, and captained the Galway U21 team which won the 2011 All-Ireland Under-21 Football Championship.

Forde made his debut for the Galway senior football team in the 2011 Connacht Senior Football Championship semi-final against Mayo. After playing for Galway in the 2013 season, he moved to London ahead of the 2014 season. Forde returned to play in the 2015 FBD Insurance League. However, after participating in Galway's first two 2015 Allianz League Division Two games, he was ruled out for the rest of the 2015 season due to a cruciate ligament injury.

Achievements
Preceded by Jonny Cooper (Dublin)	All-Ireland Under-21 Football Final winning captain 2011	Succeeded by Kevin O'Brien (Dublin)
