= Donie Shine =

Irish Gaelic footballer and manager

Personal information
- Born: 19 August 1951 Ireland
- Died: 28 April 2017 (aged 65) Ireland

Sport
- Sport: Gaelic football
- Position: Forward
Club
Years	Club	Apps (scores)
	Clann na nGael	3-17 13
Club titles
- Roscommon titles: 0
Inter-county
- Years: County
- Roscommon
Inter-county titles
- All-Irelands: 0
- NFL: 0
- All Stars: 0

Donie Shine (19 August 1951 – 28 April 2017) was a player and manager from County Roscommon. He was manager of the Roscommon county team in the early '90s. His son Donal played for Roscommon at all levels, winning Connacht and All-Ireland Minor Football Championship medals in 2006, as well as Connacht Under-21 Football Championship and Connacht Senior Football Championship in 2010.
