= Niamh McEvoy (Parnells Gaelic footballer) =

Dublin senior ladies' footballer

Personal information
- Occupation: Lecturer/Coach

Sport
- Sport: Ladies' Gaelic football
- Position: Defender/midfielder
Clubs
- Years: Club
- 2007–2011: Parnells → DCU
Inter-county
- Years: County
- 200x–201x: Dublin
Inter-county titles
- All-Irelands: 1

Niamh McEvoy is a former senior Dublin ladies' footballer. She was a member of the Dublin team that won the 2010 All-Ireland Senior Ladies' Football Championship final. She was one of two players named Niamh McEvoy who played for Dublin in the 2010 final. The player sharing her name, Niamh McEvoy of St. Sylvester's, replaced her when she came on as a second-half substitute. She had previously played for Dublin in the 2003, 2004 and 2009 All-Ireland finals. McEvoy also captained the Dublin team.

== Early years, family and education ==
Between 1997 and 1999 McEvoy attended Coláiste Íde where she gained a Diploma in Sport and Fitness Administration/Management. Between 2007 and 2011 she attended Dublin City University where she gained a BSc in Physical Education and Biology.

== Playing career ==
=== Club ===
At club level, McEvoy played for Parnells and DCU. She was a member of DCU team that won the 2010 O'Connor Cup.

=== Inter-county ===
McEvoy was a member of the Dublin team that won the 2010 All-Ireland Senior Ladies' Football Championship final. She was one of two players named Niamh McEvoy who played for Dublin in the 2010 final. The player sharing her name, Niamh McEvoy of St. Sylvester's, replaced her when she came on as a second-half substitute. She had previously played for Dublin in the 2003, 2004 and 2009 All-Ireland finals. McEvoy also captained the Dublin team.

| | All-Ireland Finals | Place | Opponent | Goal/Points |
|---|---|---|---|---|
| 1 | 2003 | Runner up | Mayo | 0–0 |
| 2 | 2004 | Runner up | Galway | 0–0 |
| 3 | 2009 | Runner up | Cork | 0–0 |
| 4 | 2010 | Winners | Tyrone | 0–0 |

== Lecturer/Coach ==
While still playing football actively, McEvoy coached young girls at the Gaelic Athletic Association summer camps. Since 2011 McEvoy has worked as a lecturer at Pearse College. Since 2015 she has served as a coach and/or selector with the DCU, Kildare and Dublin ladies' football teams. She has helped coach the Dublin team while the player sharing her name, Niamh McEvoy of St. Sylvester's, has been a member of the team.

== Honours ==
Dublin

- All-Ireland Senior Ladies' Football Championship
  - Winners: 2010: 1
  - Runner up: 2003, 2004, 2009: 3

DCU GAA

- O'Connor Cup
  - Winners: 2009, 2010, 2011: 3 ?
