= Jonny Cooper =

Irish Gaelic footballer

Jonathan "Jonny" Cooper
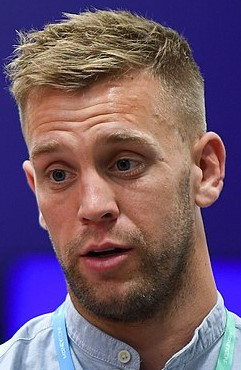
- Cooper in 2018

Personal information
- Born: 4 November 1989 (age 36) Dublin, Ireland

Sport
- Sport: Gaelic football
- Position: Right Corner Back
Club
- Years: Club
- Na Fianna
College
- Years: College
- DCU
College titles
- Sigerson titles: 2
Inter-county*
Years	County	Apps (scores)
2012–2022	Dublin	11 (0-1)
Inter-county titles
- Leinster titles: 10
- All-Irelands: 8
- NFL: 5
- All Stars: 2
- *Inter County team apps and scores correct as of 23 August 2014.

Jonathan Cooper (born 4 November 1989) is a dual player, who nowadays predominantly plays Gaelic footballer for the Na Fianna club and, formerly, for the Dublin county football team.

Cooper played hurling at schoolboy and minor level. First playing football under manager Jim Gavin at under-21 level, Cooper was reckoned to be one of Gavin's most trusted players when Gavin managed the county team.

== Early life ==
The youngest of four children born to Brendan and Loyola, Cooper has two brothers called Niall and Mark and a sister called Jules.

He is a grandnephew of Simon Deignan, who played in the Polo Grounds final of 1947.

Loyola's father, who helped found the Na Fianna club in 1955, had emigrated from Cavan and begun a clothes wholesale business in Ranelagh. Cooper often worked there during summers from about the age of ten. Cooper's grandfather died before the Blue Wave began.

== Playing career ==
=== Underage: 2006–2010 ===
Cooper won an All-Ireland "A" Hurling medal while playing with Dublin Colleges in 2006 and the Leinster Minor Hurling Championship the year after. He knew future Dublin teammate Stephen Cluxton as a teacher at his school.

Jim Gavin named Cooper as captain of the 2010 Dublin under-21 football team when he was manager.

In early 2011, Cooper required surgery on a shoulder but kept playing in the hope that Pat Gilroy would call him into his Dublin squad. When this did not occur, Cooper underwent surgery in March that year.

=== Early senior: 2012–2014 ===
Some games for Dublin followed in 2012, under Gilroy's management. But not many. Gilroy later dropped Cooper from the Dublin team. His physique and his intelligence were flaws to his progress.

His former under-21 mentors Declan Darcy and Jim Gavin were puzzled why Cooper was not playing for Dublin. Darcy even called Cooper for the first time in about a year to enquire why Cooper was not playing more games. "They were very good", Copper later said. "I think they came to me first". The morning after he watched the Dublin team win the 2011 All-Ireland Senior Football Championship Final, Cooper went training "because I knew the 30-odd guys that [sic] were my direct competitors weren't going to be training and I was trying to get the edge there, in my own small way".

Cooper played some games in the 2012 National Football League, but only 20 championship minutes in the Leinster Senior Football Championship quarter-final win over Louth. For the 2012 Leinster SFC final, Cooper was given the number 33 jersey; he kept it with his other jerseys and would use it to motivate himself to become a better player.

Cooper was part of the Dublin team that defeated Tyrone by 0–18 to 0–17 to win the 2013 National Football League, with Gavin having by then been appointed manager. He was then part of the Dublin team that beat Mayo by 2–12 to 1–14 in the 2013 All-Ireland Senior Football Championship Final. In 2014, Cooper won both the 2014 National Football League and the 2014 Leinster Senior Football Championship with Dublin, before an infamous semi-final defeat to Donegal ended their season.

Then, in September 2014, came the attack. This brought unwanted public attention to Cooper and created headlines in the national press: "I remember a guy in a car following me with a camera... Guys knocking on the door". Mick Bohan — then part of the Dublin management team — and Gavin visited Cooper in the Mater Hospital. Cooper received professional counselling and it took 18–24 months to fully recover.

=== 2015–2022: Six-in-a-row and retirement ===
A foot injury sustained during club month in April led to Cooper being sidelined for the 2019 Leinster Senior Football Championship. He began to slip down the ranks with Dublin, appearing as part of the "B" team during training games. For Cooper it was like when he had been dropped by Pat Gilroy.

On 31 December 2022, Cooper announced his retirement from inter-county football, ending his 11-year senior career.

== Style ==
Ahead of All-Ireland finals, he usually takes the Friday off work. He is a self-admitted introvert.

Cooper is interested in other sports teams, including the Leinster and Munster rugby union teams and Australian rules football club Richmond and studies them in order to improve is own performances. In 2018, he paid for a trip to London-based rugby union club Saracens, where he met with and discussed "all sorts of different things" with England national rugby union team captain Owen Farrell.

Achievements
Preceded by Colm O'Neill (Cork)	All-Ireland Under-21 FC winning captain 2010	Succeeded by Colin Forde (Galway)
