= Damien Reck =

Irish hurler (born 1998)

Personal information
- Native name: Damian Ó Raigill (Irish)
- Born: 1998 (age 27–28) Enniscorthy, County Wexford, Ireland
- Occupation: Student

Sport
- Sport: Hurling
- Position: Centre-back
Club
- Years: Club
- Oylegate-Glenbrien
Club titles
- Wexford titles: 0
College
- Years: College
- 2017-present: DCU Dóchas Éireann
College titles
- Fitzgibbon titles: 0
Inter-county*
Years	County	Apps (scores)
2017-present	Wexford	11 (0-02)
Inter-county titles
- Leinster titles: 1
- All-Irelands: 0
- NHL: 0
- All Stars: 0
- *Inter County team apps and scores correct as of 17:32, 1 July 2019.

Damien Reck (born 1998) is an Irish hurler who plays for Wexford Intermediate Championship club Oylegate-Glenbrien and at inter-county level with the Wexford senior hurling team. He usually lines out as a centre-back.

== Playing career ==
=== DCU Dóchas Éireann ===
As a student at Dublin City University, Reck immediately became involved in hurling and joined the college's freshers' hurling team in his first year. On 21 March 2018, he was selected at right wing back but spent much of the game at midfield when Dublin City University faced the University of Limerick in the freshers' final. Reck scored four points from play and ended the game with a winners' medal following the 1–20 to 2–15 victory.

=== Oylegate-Glenbrien ===
Reck joined the Oylegate-Glenbrien club at a young age and played in all grades at juvenile and underage levels before eventually joining the club's top adult team in the Wexford Intermediate Championship.

On 15 October 2016, Reck lined out at midfield when Oylegate-Glenbrien faced Adamstown in the Wexford Intermediate Championship final. He scored four points in total and ended the game with a winners' medal following the 1–14 to 0–10 victory.

=== Wexford ===
==== Minor and under-21 ====
Reck first lined out for Wexford as a member of the minor team during the 2015 Leinster Championship. He made his first appearance for the team on 11 April when he came on as a substitute in a 2–13 to 0–17 defeat of Laois.

Reck was eligible for the minor grade again during the 2016 Leinster Championship. He lined out at midfield in the Leinster final on 8 July 2012 and scored 0–03 in the 2–12 to 0–12 defeat by Dublin.

Reck was drafted onto the Wexford under-21 team in advance of the 2018 Leinster Championship. He made his first appearance in that grade on 20 June 2018 when he lined out at centre-back in Wexford's 3–15 to 3–12 defeat of Dublin. Reck retained his position at centre-back for the 4–21 to 2-26 extra-time defeat by Galway in the Leinster final on 4 July 2018.

==== Senior ====
Reck was added to the Wexford senior team prior to the start of the 2017 National League. He made his first appearance for the team on 5 March 2017 when he lined out at right wing-back in a 3–18 to 0–12 defeat of Kerry. On 2 July 2017, Reck was an unused substitute when Wexford suffered a 0–29 to 1–17 defeat by Galway in the Leinster final.

On 20 January 2018, Reck was named amongst the substitutes when Wexford faced Kilkenny in the Walsh Cup final. He was introduced as a half-time substitute in the 1-24 apiece draw. Wexford won the subsequent free-taking shoot-out, with Reck claiming his first silverware at senior level with Wexford. He made his Leinster Championship debut on 20 May 2018 in a 0–22 to 2–14 defeat of Dublin.

Wexford reached a second Leinster final in three years on 30 June 2019. Reck was an unused substitute throughout the game but collected a winners' medal following the 1–23 to 0–23 defeat of Kilkenny.

== Career statistics ==
=== Inter-county ===
As of match played 30 June 2019.

Team	Year	National League			Leinster		All-Ireland		Total	
Team	Year	Division	Apps	Score	Apps	Score	Apps	Score	Apps	Score
Wexford	2017	Division 1B	5	0-01	0	0-00	0	0-00	5	0-01
Wexford	2018	Division 1A	6	0-00	4	0-01	2	0-01	12	0-02
Wexford	2019	Division 1A	6	0-00	4	0-00	0	0-00	10	0-00
Career total			17	0-01	8	0-01	2	0-01	27	0-03

== Honours ==
DCU Dóchas Éireann

- All-Ireland Freshers' Hurling Championship (1): 2018

Oylegate-Glenbrien

- Wexford Intermediate Hurling Championship (1): 2016

Wexford

- Leinster Senior Hurling Championship (1): 2019
