= Pádraig O'Neill =

Irish Gaelic footballer (1966–2024)

Personal information
- Native name: Pádraig Ó Néill (Irish)
- Born: 1966 Newry, County Armagh, Northern Ireland
- Died: 20 July 2024 (aged 58) Beaumont, Dublin, Ireland
- Occupation: Engineer

Sport
- Sport: Gaelic football
- Position: Full-back
Club
- Years: Club
- 1982-2005: Cooley Kickhams
Club titles
- Louth titles: 0
College
- Years: College
- Ulster University
College titles
- Sigerson titles: 3
Inter-county
- Years: County
- Armagh; Louth
Inter-county titles
- Ulster titles: 0
- All-Irelands: 0
- NFL: 0
- All Stars: 0

Pádraig O'Neill (1966 – 20 July 2024) was an Irish Gaelic footballer. At club level he played with Cooley Kickhams and at inter-county level with the Armagh and Louth senior football teams.

== Playing career ==
Born in Newry, County Armagh, O'Neill's family moved to Carlingford, County Louth at a young age. He first played Gaelic football to a high standard as a student at the Abbey Christian Brothers' Grammar School in Newry, losing consecutive MacRory Cup finals in 1982 and 1983. O'Neill later attended Ulster University and won three Sigerson Cup titles.

O'Neill's club career began at juvenile level with Cumann Peile Cuchulainn before progressing to the Cooley Kickhams underage sides. Louth MFC and Louth U21FC titles followed. O'Neill made his senior team debut in 1982. He won several Cardinal O'Donnell Cup and ACC Cup titles in a lengthy career that ended in 2005.

O'Neill first appeared on the inter-county scene with Armagh as captain of the minor team beaten by Derry in the 1984 Ulster MFC final. He later progressed to the under-21 team. O'Neill was part of the senior team beaten by Donegal in the 1990 Ulster SFC final. He later declared for the Louth senior football team.

== Coaching career ==
In retirement from playing, O'Neill became involved in team management and coaching. He was manager of the Naomh Malachi team when they won the Louth IFC title in 2009.

== Personal life and death ==
O'Neill's nephews, Callum, Rian and Oisín O'Neill, were part of the Armagh senior team that won the All-Ireland SFC title in 2024.

O'Neill suffered a heart attack after attending Armagh's defeat of Kerry in the 2024 All-Ireland SFC semi-final. He died at Beaumont Hospital in Dublin, on 20 July 2024, at the age of 58.

== Honours ==
=== Player ===
Ulster University

- Sigerson Cup: 1986, 1987, 1991

Cooley Kickhams

- ACC Cup: 1984, 1987, 1998, 2003
- Louth Under-21 Football Championship: 1982
- Louth Minor Football Championship: 1984

=== Management ===
Naomh Malachi

- Louth Intermediate Football Championship: 2009
