= 2012 O'Byrne Cup =

Tournament details
- Province: Leinster
- Year: 2012
- Trophy: O'Byrne Cup

Winners
- Champions: DCU

The 2012 O'Byrne Cup was a Gaelic football competition played by the teams of Leinster GAA. The competition differs from the Leinster Senior Football Championship as it also features further education colleges and the winning team does not progress to another tournament at All-Ireland level. The winners of the 2011 O'Byrne Cup were Kildare. The O'Byrne Cup began on 8 January 2012. Prior to the start of the competition, Kilkenny announced that they would not be participating in the competition this year.

== O'Byrne Cup ==
First round 8 January 2012
Meath	1-13
Wexford	1-10
Wicklow	1-14
D.C.U.	0-18
Longford	0-13
Athlone I.T.	1-09
Kildare	2-11
D.I.T.	0-09
Offaly	3-06
Westmeath	0-07
Carlow	0-10
Dublin	0-17
Laois	0-11
U.C.D.	0-15

Quarter-finals; 15 January 2012
Meath	0-11
Louth	0-05
D.C.U.	2-11
Longford	0-12
Kildare	0-17
Offaly	0-04
Dublin	4-14
U.C.D.	0-12

Semi-finals; 22 January 2012
Meath	0-06
D.C.U.	2-08
Kildare	1-11
Dublin	0-08

Final; 29 January 2012
D.C.U.	3-07
Kildare	1-12

=== First round ===
The first round winners Meath, DCU, Longford, Kildare, Offaly, Dublin and UCD went on to qualify for the quarter-finals of the tournament. The losers of the first round went on to the O'Byrne Shield quarter finals. All the first round matches took place on 8 January 2012.

8 January 2012

Meath	1-13 - 1-10	Wexford

Pairc Tailteann, Navan
8 January 2012

Wicklow	1-14 - 0-18	D.C.U.

Baltinglass
8 January 2012

Longford	0-13 - 1-09	Athlone I.T.

Leo Casey Park, Ballymahon
8 January 2012

Kildare	2-11 - 0-09	D.I.T.

St Conleth's Park, Newbridge
8 January 2012

Offaly	3-06 - 0-07	Westmeath

O'Connor Park, Tullamore
8 January 2012

Carlow	0-10 - 0-17	Dublin

Dr Cullen Park, Carlow
8 January 2012

Laois	0-11 - 0-15	U.C.D.

Crettyard

=== Quarter-finals ===
15 January 2012

Meath	0-11 - 0-05	Louth

Pairc Tailteann, Navan
15 January 2012

D.C.U.	2-11 - 0-12	Longford

Ballymahon
15 January 2012

Kildare	0-17 - 0-4	Offaly

St Conleth's Park, Newbridge
15 January 2012

Dublin	4-14 - 0-12	U.C.D.

Parnell Park, Dublin

=== Semi-finals ===
22 January 2012

Meath	0-06 - 2-08	D.C.U.

Navan
22 January 2012

Kildare	1-11 - 0-08	Dublin

St Conleth's Park, Newbridge
Referee: Eddie Kinsella

=== Final ===
The final of the O'Byrne Cup was originally supposed to take place on 29 January 2012. However, due to the venue (St Conleth's Park) being waterlogged, it was postponed. The new date was Friday 17 February in Portlaoise.

17 February 2012

D.C.U.	3-07 - 1-12	Kildare
D. Rock (2-3), P. McMahon (1-0), R. Hennelly, P. Flynn, C. Cregg, A. McFadden (0-1 each)	Report	E. Callaghan (1-1), C. McDonnell (0-3), D. Lawlor, S. Hanafin (0-2 each), S. Bergin, H. McGrillen, A. Smith, K. Donnelly (0-1 each)

O'Moore Park, Portlaoise

== O'Byrne Shield ==
The O'Byrne Shield consists of the 7 losing teams from the first round of the O'Byrne Cup.

Quarter-finals; 15 January 2012		Semi-finals; 22 January 2012		Final; 29 January 2012
		Wexford	1-15
Wicklow	1-12	Wicklow	0-17
Athlone I.T.	1-09			Wexford	1-06
D.I.T.	0-16			Laois	1-15
Westmeath	0-13	D.I.T.	0-07
Carlow	1-07	Laois	0-15
Laois	1-14

=== Quarter-finals ===
15 January 2012

Wicklow	1-12 - 1-09	Athlone I.T.

Baltinglass
15 January 2012

D.I.T.	0-16 - 0-13	Westmeath

Kinnegad
15 January 2012

Carlow	1-14 - 1-07	Laois

Carlow

=== Semi-finals ===
22 January 2012

Wexford	1-15 - 0-17	Wicklow

Enniscorthy
22 January 2012

D.I.T.	0-07 - 0-15	Laois

Portarlington

=== Final ===
29 January 2012

Wexford	1-06 - 1-15	Laois
	Report

Clongeen

== See also ==
- 2012 Dr McKenna Cup
