= 2009 All-Ireland Senior Ladies' Football Championship final =

2009 All-Ireland Senior Ladies' Football Final
- Event: 2009 All-Ireland Senior Ladies' Football Championship
Cork	Dublin
1–9	0–11
- Fifth of five titles in a row for Cork
- Date: 27 September 2009
- Venue: Croke Park, Dublin
- Referee: Declan Corcoran (Mayo)
- Attendance: 21,606

The 2009 All-Ireland Senior Ladies' Football Championship Final featured Cork and Dublin. Dublin made their first appearance in the final since 2004. Cork would win their fifth successive All-Ireland title. In a closely contested final, Cork scored four points in the final eight minutes to clinch the title by a single point.

== Match info ==
27 September 2009

Cork	1–9; 0–11	Dublin
Valerie Mulcahy (0-5); Nollaig Cleary (1-1); Juliet Murphy (0-2); Mairéad Kelly (0-1)		Sinéad Aherne (0-3); Mary Nevin (0-2); Amy McGuinness (0-2); Siobhán McGrath (0-1); Elaine Kelly (0-1); Lyndsey Davey (0-1); Lindsay Peat (0-1)

Croke Park, Dublin
Attendance: 21,606
Referee: Declan Corcoran (Mayo)

== Teams ==
Manager: Éamonn Ryan Team: 1 Elaine Harte; 2 Rena Buckley; 3 Angela Walsh; 4 Geraldine O'Flynn; 5 Ciara O'Sullivan; 6 Bríd Stack; 7 Briege Corkery; 8 Juliet Murphy; 9 Norita Kelly; 10 Nollaig Cleary; 11 Deirdre O'Reilly; 12 Amy O'Shea; 13 Mary O'Connor (c); 14 Valerie Mulcahy; 15 Rhona Buckley Substitutes: Laura McMahon for O'Shea (39); Linda Barrett for Rhona Buckley (42); Mairéad Kelly for O'Connor (51)	Manager: Gerry McGill Team: 1 Clíodhna O'Connor; 2 Avril Cluxton; 3 Noelle Comyn; 4 Maria Kavanagh; 5 Colleen Barrett; 6 Sorcha Furlong; 7 Siobhán McGrath; 8 Denise Masterson (c); 9 Niamh McEvoy; 10 Mary Nevin; 11 Amy McGuinness; 12 Elaine Kelly; 13 Lyndsey Davey; 14 Sinéad Aherne; 15 Lindsay Peat Substitutes: L. Kidd for Cluxton (27); N. Hurley for Kelly (39); E. Travers for Barrett (54); K. Flood for McEvoy (56); R. Byrne for Nevin (57)
