= 2012 Dr McKenna Cup =

Tournament details
- Province: Ulster
- Year: 2012

The 2012 Dr McKenna Cup was a Gaelic football competition played under the auspices of Ulster GAA. The tournament was won by Tyrone, their first McKenna title since 2007. They defeated Derry in the final. The final was noted for the attendance of Northern Ireland First Minister Peter Robinson and Deputy First Minister Martin McGuinness.

== See also ==
- 2012 O'Byrne Cup
- 2012 McGrath Cup
