= David Keenan (Gaelic footballer) =

Irish Gaelic footballer

Personal information
- Born: Ireland

Sport
- Sport: Gaelic football
- Position: Half back
Club
- Years: Club
- 2000s: St. Barry's
Club titles
- Roscommon titles: 0
Inter-county
- Years: County
- 2008-2016: Roscommon
Inter-county titles
- Connacht titles: 1
- All-Irelands: 0
- NFL: 0
- All Stars: 0

David Keenan is a Gaelic footballer from County Roscommon who played club football with St Barry's and at inter-county level with the Roscommon senior football team.

Keenan was a member of the Roscommon minor team that beat Kerry in the 2006 All-Ireland Minor Football Championship final. In 2010, he was part of the DCU team that won the 2010 O'Byrne Cup beating Louth in the final and the Sigerson Cup beating UCC. In 2010, he was a member of the senior Roscommon team that won the Connacht Senior Football Championship.
