= Kevin O'Brien (Dublin Gaelic footballer) =

Irish Gaelic footballer

Personal information
- Native name: Caoimhín Ó Briain (Irish)
- Nickname: Kev

Sport
- Sport: Gaelic football
- Position: Right Corner Back
Club
- Years: Club
- 2008–: Naomh Mearnóg
College
- Years: College
- DIT
College titles
- Sigerson titles: 1
Inter-county titles
- Leinster titles: 2
- NFL: 1

Kevin O'Brien a Gaelic footballer who has played for the Naomh Mearnóg club.

On 13 February 2014, O'Brien ruptured his anterior cruciate ligament while playing for DIT in the Sigerson Cup, which sidelined him for the rest of the 2014 season.

== Honours ==
- Leinster Under-21 Football Championship (1): 2012
- All-Ireland Under-21 Football Championship (1): 2012
- Leinster Senior Football Championship (2): 2012, 2013
- National Football League (1): 2013

Achievements
Preceded by Colin Forde (Galway)	All-Ireland Under-21 Football Final winning captain 2012	Succeeded by Fiontán Ó Curraoin (Galway)
