= Cathal Cregg =

Gaelic football player

Personal information
- Born: County Roscommon

Sport
- Sport: Gaelic Football
- Position: Centre forward
Club
- Years: Club
- 2000's: Western Gaels
College
- Years: College
- DCU
College titles
- Sigerson titles: 1
Inter-county
- Years: County
- 2006-2021: Roscommon
Inter-county titles
- Connacht titles: 3
- NFL: 0

Cathal Cregg is a footballer from County Roscommon, Ireland. He has played with Roscommon at all levels and helped them to win the 2010 Connacht Senior Football Championship.He played for the Ireland international rules team in 2014.
