= 2019 HEC O'Connor Cup =

HEC O'Connor Cup
Tournament details
- Year: 2019
- Trophy: Michael O'Connor Cup
- Sponsor: Gourmet Food Parlour
- Dates: 6 February– 9 March
- Teams: 6
- Defending champions: DCU

Winners
- Champions: University of Limerick (12th win)
- Manager: D.J. Collins
- Captain: Eimear Scally

Runners-up
- Runners-up: UCD
- Manager: Conor Barry

The 2019 HEC O'Connor Cup was won by University of Limerick who defeated UCD by 2–16 to 1–10 in the final. Six teams were invited to take part in the competition. Queen's University and UCC reached the semi-finals while DCU defeated NUI Galway by 3–18 to 0–6 to win the Michael O'Connor Shield.

== Group stage ==
Six teams were invited to take part in the 2019 O'Connor Cup. They were drawn into two groups of three. UCD, Queen's University and NUI Galway were placed in Group A while University of Limerick, UCC and DCU, were placed in Group B. Each group played three rounds of games during February. The top two teams from each group qualified for the O'Connor Cup semi-finals. The two third placed teams played off for the O'Connor Shield.

=== Group A ===
6 February 2019	Queen's University	v	UCD	Queen's University

20 February 2019	UCD	v	NUI Galway	Billings Park

27 February 2019	NUI Galway	v	Queen's University	NUI Galway

Final table

Key to colours
Qualified for semi-finals
Quafified for Michael O'Connor Shield

Team	Pld	W	D	L	Group Points	Score Difference
UCD	2
Queen's University	2
NUI Galway	2

=== Group B ===
6 February 2019	DCU	1–10;3–9	UCC	DCU Glasnevin

20 February 2019	UCC	v	University of Limerick	UCC

27 February 2019	University of Limerick	v	DCU	University of Limerick

Final table

Team	Pld	W	D	L	Group Points	Score Difference
University of Limerick	2
UCC	2
DCU	2	0	0	2	0

== O'Connor Cup Weekend ==
The O'Connor Shield play off, the two O'Connor Cup semi-finals and the final all formed part of the O'Connor Cup Weekend which was hosted by DIT GAA and the GAA Centre of Excellence in Abbotstown. The final was streamed live by TG4 on their YouTube channel.

=== Semi-finals ===
8 March 2019	UCD	2–7;1–9	UCC	Abbotstown
15.00	Áine McDonagh (0-4); Andrea Murphy (1-0); Chloe Foxe (1-0); Tarah O'Sullivan (0-1); Lucy McCartan (0-1); Dearbhaile Beirne (0-1)		Niamh Cotter (1-1); Libby Coppinger (0-3); Ciara McCarthy (0-3); Orlagh Farmer (0-1); Caoimhe Condon (0-1)	Referee: Gus Chapman (Sligo)

8 March 2019	University of Limerick	7–16;2–9	Queen's University	Abbotstown
17.00	Eimear Scally (1-9); Rosin Howard (3-1); Hannah O'Donoghue (2-0); Louise Ward (1-0); Shauna Kelly (0-1); Shauna Howley (0-1); Laurie Ryan (0-1); Rebecca Delee (0-1); Fiona McHale (0-1); Orla O'Dwyer (0-1)		Niamh Reel (1-3); Grainne McLaughlin (1-0); Sarah Britton (0-2); Eimear McAnespie (0-2); L Duffy (0-1); Slaine McCarroll (0-1)	Referee: Niall McCormack (Laois)

=== O'Connor Shield ===
8 March 2019	DCU	3–18;0–6	NUI Galway	DIT Broombridge
18.30	Aisling Moloney (2–6); Lara Curran (0–5); Aisling Murphy (1–1); Sinead Finnegan (0–2); Ciana Finnegan (0–2); Amy Gavan Mangan (0–1); Roisin Farrell (0–1)		Grainne Nolan (0–2); Meghan Kelly (0–2); Chloe Miskell (0–1) ?? (0–1)	Referee: Eamonn Moran (Limerick)

=== Final ===
9 March 2019	University of Limerick	2–16;1–10	UCD	DIT Grangegorman
	Eimear Scally (0-7); Hannah O'Donoghue (1-2); Fiona McHale (1-0); Rebecca Delee (0-2); Shauna Howley (0-2); Fiadhna Tagney (0-1); Emma Needham (0-1); Orla O'Dwyer (0-1)		Áine McDonagh (0-6); Chloe Foxe (1-0); Caoimhe Mohan (0-2); Kate McGrath (0-1); Dearbhaile Beirne (0-1)	Referee: Seamus Mulvihill (Kerry)
