= Donal Shine =

Roscommon Gaelic footballer

Personal information
- Born: 28 February 1989 (age 37) Ballinasloe, Ireland
- Height: 1.95 m (6 ft 5 in)

Sport
- Sport: Gaelic football
- Position: Full Forward
Club
- Years: Club
- 2006–2020: Clann na nGael
Club titles
- Roscommon titles: 2
College
- Years: College
- DCU
College titles
- Sigerson titles: 1
Inter-county
- Years: County
- 2008–2016: Roscommon
Inter-county titles
- Connacht titles: 2

Donal Shine (born 28 February 1989) is a former Gaelic footballer from County Roscommon. He played at senior level for the Roscommon county team and the Clann na nGael club.

== Early life ==
His father is former Roscommon manager Donie Shine.

He attended secondary school in Athlone Community College.

== Playing career ==
He was captain of the Clann na nGael senior team.

He played for the Roscommon minor team that defeated Kerry in the 2006 All-Ireland Minor Football Championship final. He was part of the DCU team that won the 2010 O'Byrne Cup, defeating Louth in the final and the Sigerson Cup (defeating UCC). In 2010 he helped the Roscommon under-21 team to a Connacht Under-21 Football Championship after a 1–6 to 0–4 win over Sligo. Later in the year, he again starred in a provincial final against Sligo as he scored 10 points in Roscommon's 0–14 to 0-13 Connacht Senior Football Championship win.

In 2015, he picked up his first senior County medal with Clann na nGael, scoring 1–3 in the final against Padraig Pearses. Shine's last appearance for Roscommon was in the Connacht Final in 2016 versus Galway.

He remained as a player for Clann na nGael, but was forced to retire from the game ahead of the 2021 season, injuries having caught up with him.

== Honours ==
- All-Ireland Minor Football Championship (1): 2006
- Connacht Minor Football Championship (1): 2006
- Connacht Under-21 Football Championship (1): 2010
- Connacht Senior Football Championship (2): 2010, 2016
- Sigerson Cup (1): 2010
- O'Byrne Cup (1): 2010
- All-Ireland Vocational Schools Championship (2):
- Leinster Schools titles (3):
- All-Ireland Féile title (1):
- Roscommon Senior County Title (2): 2015, 2018
