= Sean O'Neill (Louth Gaelic footballer) =

Irish Gaelic footballer (born c.1980)

Seán O'Neill
Personal information
- Native name: Seán Ó Néill (Irish)
- Born: c. 1980 County Louth

Sport
- Sport: Gaelic Football
- Position: Midfield
Club
- Years: Club
- Cooley Kickhams
Inter-county
- Years: County
- Louth

Séan O'Neill is a retired Gaelic footballer from County Louth, Ireland. He played for the Louth senior and junior county teams and for his local club Cooley Kickhams.

Having played for the Louth county minor team for three consecutive years (1996-98), O'Neill made his Senior Championship debut in the 1999 Leinster Senior Football Championship against Dublin. The game ended in a seven point defeat for Louth.

O'Neill would go on to make a total of five Senior Championship appearances for his county, while also appearing regularly in the National League. He finished on the losing side twice in O'Byrne Cup finals, in 1999 and again in 2010.

Towards the end of his career, he captained Louth to victory in the 2010 Leinster Junior Football Championship final against Cavan.

At club level, O'Neill captained Cooley Kickhams in the final of the 2004 Louth Senior Football Championship against peninsula rivals St Patrick's.

== Honours ==
=== Louth ===
- National Football League Division 2: 2006
- Tommy Murphy Cup: 2006
- Leinster Junior Football Championship: 2010

=== Cooley Kickhams ===
- Cardinal O'Donnell Cup (Louth Senior Football League): 2004, 2006, 2007, 2008
- Louth Senior Football Championship Runner-Up: 2004, 2007, 2009, 2010, 2013
- ACC/Paddy Sheelan Cup: 2003, 2004, 2005, 2006
- Louth Minor Football Championship: 1998
- Louth Minor Football League: 1997, 1998
