= 2011 All-Ireland Junior Football Championship =

Championship Details
- Dates: 29 April – 20 August 2011
- Teams: 21

All Ireland Champions
- Winners: Cork (16th win)
- Captain: Cathrach Keane
- Manager: Niall Kelleher

All Ireland Runners-up
- Runners-up: Kildare
- Captain: Ciarán Kelly

Provincial Champions
- Munster: Cork
- Leinster: Kildare
- Ulster: Not Played
- Connacht: Sligo

Championship Statistics
- Matches Played: 20
- Total Goals: 41 (2.05 per game)
- Total Points: 409 (20.45 per game)

The 2011 All-Ireland Junior Football Championship was the 81st staging of the All-Ireland Junior Championship since its establishment by the Gaelic Athletic Association in 1912.

Sligo entered the championship as the defending champions, however, they were beaten by Cork in the All-Ireland semi-final.

The All-Ireland final was played on 20 August 2011 at Semple Stadium in Thurles, between Cork and Kildare, in what was their first ever meeting in the final. Cork won the match by 1–12 to 0–13 to claim their 16th championship title overall and a first titles in two years.

== Connacht Junior Football Championship ==
=== Leinster quarter-final ===
| 29 April 2011 Quarter-final | Mayo | 1-14 - 0-15 | Leitrim | Aghamore Grounds |
| | | Report |

=== Connacht semi-finals ===
| 6 May 2011 Semi-final | Mayo | 0-13 - 1-09 | Roscommon | Ballyhaunis Grounds |

| 6 May 2011 Semi-final | Galway | 1-07 - 1-10 | Sligo | Tuam Stadium |

=== Connacht final ===
| 4 June 2011 Final | Mayo | 1-09 - 1-10 | Sligo | Fr O'Hara Park |
| | M Conroy (0-4), D Coen (1-0), C Dempsey (0-2, 1f), A Egan (0-2), S Cloherty (0-1). | Report | V Frizzell (0-6, 3fs), G Gaughan (1-1), J Hynes (0-2), P Hughes (0-1). |

== Leinster Junior Football Championship ==
=== Leinster preliminary round ===
| 11 May 2011 Preliminary round | Meath | 0-08 - 1-09 | Longford | Páirc Tailteann |
| | D Carroll (0-2 fs), D Queeney (0-2, fs), J O'Reilly (0-2), C Kerrigan (0-1), R Madden (0-1). | | J Noonan (1-2, 0-2 fs), C Williams (0-3), J Keegan (0-1), E Ledwith (0-1); M McDonald (0-1), W Crawford (0-1). | Referee: B Hickey (Kildare) |

=== Leinster quarter-finals ===
| 25 May 2011 Quarter-final | Longford | 2-06 - 1-12 | Cavan | Pearse Park |
| | J Noonan (0-4, 4f), M McDonnell (1-0), E Ledwith (1-0), J Martin (0-1), B McKeon (0-1). | | J O'Reilly (1-2), N Murray (0-2, 2f); G McKiernan (0-1), M Lyng (0-1), S Jordan (0-1), D Meehan (0-1), M Brady (0-1); K Fannin (0-1), A O'Reilly (0-1), R McCormack (0-1). | Referee: S Carroll (Westmeath) |

| 25 May 2011 Quarter-final | Kildare | 2-14 - 1-08 | Louth | St Conleth's Park |
| | D Mulhall 1-3 (2f), C Kelly 0-5, O Lyons 1-0, J Gately 0-3 (1f), M Conway 0-2 (1f), P Dunne 0-1. | Report | D Reid 1-5 (1pen, 3fs), B Osbourne 0-2, B Donnelly 0-1 (1f). | Referee: N Ward (Westmeath) |

| 25 May 2011 Quarter-final | Kilkenny | 3-05 - 0-13 | Wexford | Nowlan Park |
| | D Prendergast 1-3 (0-2f), JJ Dunphy 1-1, M Malone 1-0, J Fennelly 0-1. | Report | M O’Regan 0-3 (all frees), J Holmes 0-1(free), S O’Neill, J Carty 0-2 each, K Gore, S O’Loughlin, K Cahill, P Kelly 0-1 each. | Referee: A Nolan (Wicklow) |

| 25 May 2011 Quarter-final | Dublin | 2-13 - 1-09 | Wicklow | Parnell Park |
| | H Dawson (0-5); G Seavers (0-4), O McCann (1-0), E Kinsella (1-0), R Croft (0-2, 2f), C O'Brien (0-1), J Noonan (0-1). | | D Siney (1-4, 2f), C Rowden (0-2), B Dalton (0-2); J Sheeran (0-1). | Referee: P Kneel (Louth) |

=== Leinster semi-finals ===
| 8 June 2011 Semi-final | Kilkenny | 0-04 - 0-13 | Cavan | Nowlan Park |

| 8 June 2011 Semi-final | Dublin | 0-05 - 1-09 | Kildare | Parnell Park |

=== Leinster final ===
| 6 July 2011 Final | Kildare | 5-08 - 1-09 | Cavan | St Conleth's Park |
| | C Kelly 2-1 (1f), M Conway 1-0, D Campbell 1-0, E Carew 1-0, D Mulhall 0-2fs, P Meagher 0-2, J Gately 0-1, P Dunne 0-1, T Archbold 0-1. | Report | K Fannin 1-2, J O’Reilly 0-3 (1f), D Meehan 0-1, S Gaffney 0-1, T Reilly 0-1, R McCormack 0-1. | Referee: P Kneel (Louth) |

== Munster Junior Football Championship ==
=== Munster quarter-finals ===
| 22 May 2011 Quarter-final | Kerry | 2-16 - 1-08 | Tipperary | FitzGerald Stadium |
| | A Fitzgerald 1-4 (0-2f), G O'Grady 1-1 (0-1f), G Sayers 0-4, B Poff 0-2, B Maguire, E Hickson, J Walsh, B Costello, J Spillane 0-1 each. | Report | A Moloney 1-3 (2f), G Ryan 0-3, J Egan, D Butler 0-1 each. | Referee: C Lane (Cork) |

| 22 May 2011 Quarter-final | Cork | 2-14 - 0-06 | Clare | Páirc Uí Chaoimh |
| | C Keane 2-1, C O'Driscoll 0-4 (1f), M Cronin 0-3 (1f), K O'Driscoll 0-2, D O'Donovan (1f), A O'Sullivan, S O'Sullivan, A O'Brien 0-1 each. | Report | M McCarthy 0-5 (3f), P McMahon 0-1 (1f). | Referee: B Tyrrell (Tipperary) |

=== Munster semi-finals ===
| 4 June 2011 Semi-final | Limerick | 0-06 - 1-19 | Kerry | Gaelic Grounds |
| | G Noonan 0-3 (3f), D Kelly, J Bourke, T Collins 0-1 each. | Report | A Fitzgerald 1-8 (0-6f, 1-0 pen, 1 '45'), G Sayers 0-3, B Poff, A Garnett, G O'Grady (1f) 0-2 each, P Kennelly, M Brennan 0-1 each. | Referee: K O'Brien (Cork) |

| 5 June 2011 Semi-final | Cork | 3-18 - 1-08 | Waterford | Páirc Uí Chaoimh |
| | T Clancy 2-0, K O’Driscoll 1-1, B Coughlan, M Cronin (1f), A O’Brien, C Keane 0-3 each, D O’Donovan (1f), K Harrington, S O’Sullivan 0-1 each. | Report | E Walsh 0-4 (3f), E Hogan 1-1, J Wall 0-2f, C Guiry 0-1. | Referee: R Moloney (Limerick) |

=== Munster final ===
| 6 July 2011 Final | Cork | 0-10 - 1-05 | Kerry | Páirc Uí Chaoimh |
| | K Hallissey 0-4 (0-1f), B Coughlan (0-1f), D O’Donovan 0-2 each, M Cronin (0-1f), A O’Brien 0-1 each. | Report | A Garnett 1-0, J Walsh 0-2, G O’Grady (0-1f), A Fitzgerald (0-1f), B Costello 0-1 each. | Attendance: 949; Referee: K O'Brien (Tipperary) |

== All-Ireland Junior Football Championship ==
=== All-Ireland semi-finals ===
| 7 August 2011 Semi-final | Kildare | 0-16 - 2-06 | Warwickshire | St Conleth's Park |
| | D Mulhall (0-5,3f), E Carew (0-2,1f, '45); T Moolick (0-2), C Kelly (0-2); T Archbold (0-1), C Murphy (0-1, f), P Meagher (0-1), P Dunne (0-1), E Hyland (0-1). | | M Molloy (1-3, 1 p, 2f), L Coyne (1-1), S Sands (0-1, f), C Shields (0-1). | Referee: S Carroll (Westmeath) |

| 7 August 2011 Semi-final | Cork | 0-14 - 1-06 | Sligo | Croke Park |
| | A O'Brien (0-3), L Shorten (0-3), K Hallissey (0-2), C Keane (0-2), B Coughlan (0-1); AJ O'Connor (0-1); A O'Sullivan (0-1), M Dilworth (0-1). | Report | V Frizzell (0-6,4f); J Hynes (1-0). | Referee: P Kneel (Louth) |

=== All-Ireland final ===
| 20 August 2011 Final | Cork | 1-12 - 0-13 (aet) | Kildare | Semple Stadium |
| | K Hallissey 0-5, L Shorten 0-4, A O'Brien 1-0, S Kiely, A O'Sullivan, D O'Donovan 0-1 each | | C Murphy 0-4, D Mulhall 0-3, C Kelly 0-2, T Archibold, T Moolick, R Walsh, M Fitzharris 0-1. |

== Championship statistics ==
=== Miscellaneous ===
- Sligo retained the Connacht JFC title for the first time in their history.
