= David Kelly (Gaelic footballer) =

Irish Gaelic footballer

Personal information
- Born: {20/06/1987} Tubbercurry, County Sligo

Sport
- Sport: Gaelic football
- Position: Corner forward
Club
- Years: Club
- Tubbercurry
College
- Years: College
- DCU
College titles
- Sigerson titles: 2
Inter-county
- Years: County
- 2006-: Sligo
Inter-county titles
- Connacht titles: 1

David Kelly (born 1987) is a Gaelic footballer from Tubbercurry, County Sligo. He won a Connacht Senior Football Championship medal with the Sligo county team in 2007. That victory made Sligo the Connacht champions for the first time since 1975. He won back to back National League titles Div 4 in 2009 and Div 3 in 2010. He also played in the 2010 Connacht Senior Football Championship final when Sligo were shocked by Roscommon.
