= 2010 All-Ireland Under-21 Football Championship =

Gaelic football competition

Championship details
- Dates: 20 February – 1 May 2010
- Teams: 32

All-Ireland Champions
- Winning team: Dublin (2nd win)
- Captain: Jonny Cooper
- Manager: Jim Gavin

All-Ireland Finalists
- Losing team: Donegal
- Captain: Michael Murphy
- Manager: Jim McGuinness

Provincial Champions
- Munster: Tipperary
- Leinster: Dublin
- Ulster: Donegal
- Connacht: Roscommon

Championship statistics
- Player of the Year: Rory O'Carroll

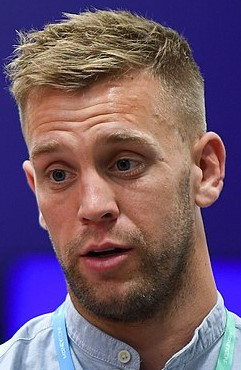
Jonny Cooper was the winning captain.

The All-Ireland Under 21 Football Championship is an under 21 Gaelic football inter county competition between the 32 counties of Ireland. Four competitions are contested in each province, and the winner of each provincial championship enters the all-Ireland series.

== Leinster Under 21 Championship ==
=== Round 1 ===
February 20, 2010; Round 1	Louth	4-16 - 0-08	Wexford	Dundalk; Referee: D Brazil (Offaly)
February 20, 2010; Round 1	J McEneaney 2-3 (2-0 pen, 0-3f), K Rogers 0-4 (0-2f), P Smith, D Maguire 1-1 each, J Califf (0-2f) 0-2, J Clarke, C O'Hanlon, N Conlon, B O'Hare, S McCann 0-1 each		K O'Grady 0-4 (0-2f), P Kelly, A Shore, C Carty (0-1f), T Foley 0-1 each	Dundalk; Referee: D Brazil (Offaly)

February 20, 2010; Round 1	Westmeath	1-06 - 0-06	Kildare	Mullingar; Referee: P Finnegan (Louth)
February 20, 2010; Round 1	J Durkan 1-0, C McCormack 0-3, I Coffey, C Lynam (0-1f), J Heslin 0-1 each	Report	K Cribben (0-1f), D Mullhall (0-1f) 0-2 each, D O'Keeffe, S Hanafin 0-1 each	Mullingar; Referee: P Finnegan (Louth)

February 21, 2010; Round 1	Wicklow	3-13 - 0-10	Longford	Aughrim; Referee: Brendan Hickey (Kildare)
February 21, 2010; Round 1	D Siney 0-7 (0-4f), S Carthy 2-1, A McLoughlin 1-0, C Murphy, C Foley, P Burke, P Cunningham and C Walsh 0-1 each	Report	R McGoldrick 0-5 (0-4f), B Farrell 0-2 (0-1f), W Crawford, P Gill, P McKeon 0-1 each	Aughrim; Referee: Brendan Hickey (Kildare)

March 6, 2010; Round 1	Offaly	1-15 - 2-14	Carlow	Tullamore; Referee: P Kneel (Louth)
March 6, 2010; Round 1	M Brazil 1-2, B Allen 0-5 (2f), N Dunne 0-4 (0-1f), A Sullivan 0-2, L Hiney and N Graham 0-1 each	Report	E Byrne 1-2, D Murphy 0-5 (0-2f), D St Ledger 0-4 (0-1f), B Murphy 1-1, J Lowry and C Walsh 0-1 each	Tullamore; Referee: P Kneel (Louth)

=== Quarter finals ===
March 6, 2010; Quarter Final	Louth	0-00 - 0-00	Dublin	Dundalk; Referee: F Kelly (Longford).
March 6, 2010; Quarter Final	J McEneaney 1-2 (0-1f), J Califf 0-3 (0-2f, 0-1 45), P Smith (f), N Conlon, B O Hehir 0-1 each	Report	D Rock 1-4 (0-3f), D Quinn (Lucan) 0-3 (0-1f), J Cooper, G McIntyre, G Sweeney 0-2 each, B Ó Ruairc 0-1	Dundalk; Referee: F Kelly (Longford).

March 6, 2010; Quarter Final	Westmeath	2-14 - 1-11	Meath	Mullingar; Referee: B O'Shea (Dublin).
March 6, 2010; Quarter Final	J Heslin 0-5 (0-4f, 0-1s), J Durkan 1-1, P Sharry 1-0, C Lynam 0-3 (0-1f), J Egan, L Smyth 0-2 each, I Coffey 0-1	Report	B Sheridan 0-7 (0-5f), M Newman 1-0, M Collins 0-2, C Berrigan, S Dalton 0-1 each	Mullingar; Referee: B O'Shea (Dublin).

March 6, 2010; Quarter Final	Wicklow	0-00 - 0-00	Laois	Aughrim; Referee: G McCormick (Dublin)
March 6, 2010; Quarter Final	D Siney 0-4 (0-2f), C Walsh (0-1f), A Merriman, B McGarr, Se Carthy, P Burke, P Cunningham 0-1 each	Report	P Cahillane 0-6 (0-2f), G Walsh (0-1f), J Booth, D Kingston 0-2 each, B Smith 0-1	Aughrim; Referee: G McCormick (Dublin)

March 10, 2010; Quarter Final	Carlow	1-16 - 0-03	Kilkenny	Dundalk
March 10, 2010; Quarter Final	D Murphy 1-5 (0-3f), B Murphy 0-5, M Ware (0-1 '45), M Clowry 0-2 each, C Walshe, C Murphy 0-1 each	Report	J Culleton, K Bergin, P Naughton 0-1 each	Dundalk

=== Semi finals ===
March 17, 2010; Semi Final	Dublin	0-14 (AET) 0-13	Carlow	Dr Cullen Park; Referee: J Curley (Meath)
March 17, 2010; Semi Final	D Rock 0-4 (0-3f), B O'Rourke 0-3, D Quinn (Na Fianna), G Sweeney 0-2 each, D Quinn (Lucan Sarsfields), C Dorney, E Keogh 0-1 each	Report	B Murphy, D Foley (0-3f), D Murphy (0-3f) 0-3 each, D Bambrick, D Kinsella, E Byrne, C Coughlan 0-1 each	Dr Cullen Park; Referee: J Curley (Meath)

March 17, 2010; 4.00; Semi Final	Westmeath	0-14 - 0-11	Laois	Mullingar; Referee: F Kelly (Longford)
March 17, 2010; 4.00; Semi Final	I Coffey 0-6 (0-5f), P Sharry 0-2, D Corroon, J Heslin, J Egan, C Lynam, C McCormack, J Durkan 0-1 each	Report	D Kingston 0-5 (0-1 sideline, 0-2f), P Cahillane 0-4 (0-3f), A Ryan, B Smith 0-1 each	Mullingar; Referee: F Kelly (Longford)

=== Final ===
April 3, 2010; Final	Dublin	1-12 - 0-9	Westmeath	Parnell Park; Attendance: 4,000; Referee: Damien Brazil (Offaly); Man of the Match: Rory O'Carroll (Kilmacud Crokes)
April 3, 2010; Final	Dean Rock 0-6 (0-5f), Ciaran Dorney 1-1, Jonny Cooper, James McCarthy, Barry O'Rorke (0-1f), David Quinn (Lucan), Ted Furman 0-1 each	Report	Conor Lynam 0-6 (0-4f), Paul Sharry, Callum McCormack, James Durkan 0-1 each	Parnell Park; Attendance: 4,000; Referee: Damien Brazil (Offaly); Man of the Match: Rory O'Carroll (Kilmacud Crokes)

== Ulster Under 21 Football Championship ==
=== Preliminary round ===
March 10, 2010; Preliminary round	Tyrone	1-07 - 0-14	Derry
March 10, 2010; Preliminary round	M Donnelly 1-2 (0-1f), P Harte 0-2 (0-1f), M McKenna, N McKenna, D McNulty 0-1 each	Report	A Kerrigan 1-4, J Kilet 0-5 (0-5f), L Moore 0-2, C O'Boyle, L Kennedy, E McGuckin 0-1 each

=== Quarter-final ===
March 24, 2010; Quarter Final	Derry	5-09 - 2-12	Fermanagh	Referee: S McNamee (Tyrone)
March 24, 2010; Quarter Final	L Moore 2-1, A Kerrigan 2-0, B Heron 1-1, L Kennedy 0-2, B Doyle, B McCallion, C O'Boyle, J Kielt (0-1f), E McGuckin 0-1 each	Report	C O'Brien 2-2 (0-1f), D Keenan 0-6 (0-3f), R Jones 0-2, T Corrigan (0-1f), K Connolly 0-1 each	Referee: S McNamee (Tyrone)

March 24, 2010; Quarter Final	Antrim	2-06 - 2-12	Monaghan	Casement Park; Referee: B Cassidy (Derry)
March 24, 2010; Quarter Final	C Fleming 2-3 (1-0 pen, 0-2f), F Burke (0-1f), M Armstrong, B Neeson 0-1 each	Report	D Hahessy 0-5 (0-2f), D Millar 1-1, K Hughes 1-0, C McGuinness 0-2 (0-1f), D Hughes, D Malone), P Tavey, D McNally 0-1 each	Casement Park; Referee: B Cassidy (Derry)

March 24, 2010; Quarter Final	Cavan	3-14 - 1-08	Down	Cavan; Referee: F Cleary (Fermanagh)
March 24, 2010; Quarter Final	D McKiernan 1-3 (0-1f), C McClarey 1-1, M O'Reilly 1-0, N McDermott 0-4 (0-2f) D Givney; G McKiernan 0-2 each, B Reilly, B Murray 0-1 each	Report	Chris Duggan 1-1, Paul Devlin 0-3 (0-3f), Paul McPolin 0-2, Darren O'Hagan, Eamon Toner 0-1 each	Cavan; Referee: F Cleary (Fermanagh)

March 24, 2010; Quarter Final	Armagh	0-09 - 1-09	Donegal	Brewster Park; Referee: E McHugh (Tyrone)
March 24, 2010; Quarter Final	F Hanratty 0-4 (4f), J Clarke (0-1f), R Grugan (0-1f), M Shields, T Donnelly C Rafferty 0-1 each	Report	D Molloy 0-6 (2f), J Carroll 1-0, L McLoone 0-2, M Murphy 0-1	Brewster Park; Referee: E McHugh (Tyrone)

=== Semi-final ===
March 31, 2010; Semi Final	Monaghan	1-09 - 1-10	Cavan	Enniskillen; Referee: E McConnell
March 31, 2010; Semi Final	D Miller 1-0, D Hahessy 0-3 (0-2f), C McGuinness 0-2 (0-1f), D Malone, K Hughes, P O'Hara, McNally 0-1 each	Report	C McClarey 1-0, (0-1f), D McKiernan 0-3 (0-2f), N McDermott, B Fitzpatrick 0-2 each, B Reilly, Maloney Derham, D Gibney 0-1 each	Enniskillen; Referee: E McConnell

March 31, 2010; Semi Final	Donegal	1-11 - 0-10	Derry	Brewster Park
March 31, 2010; Semi Final	M Murphy 1-3 (3f); D Molloy (2f), D McLaughlin, L McLoone 0-2 each; J Carroll, D Walsh 0-1 each	Report	J Kielt 0-7 (6f, 1 '45); L Moore 0-2 (1f); A Kerrigan 0-1	Brewster Park

=== Final ===
April 7, 2010; Semi Final	Donegal	2-08 - 0-07	Cavan	Brewster Park; Referee: G Corrigan (Down)
April 7, 2010; Semi Final	M Murphy 1-5 (0-2f), D Molloy 1-2 (0-1f), McFadden 0-1	Report	B Reilly 0-4 (0-2f), B Fitzpatrick 0-2, P Carroll 0-1	Brewster Park; Referee: G Corrigan (Down)

== Munster Under 21 Football Championship ==
=== Quarter-final ===
March 10, 2010; Quarter Final	Limerick	1-10 - 0-10	Clare
March 10, 2010; Quarter Final	E O’Connor 0-5 (0-3f), C Joyce-Power 1-1, S O’Carroll 0-2, T McMahon, E Joy 0-1 each	Report	G Leahy 0-5 (0-3f), S Brennan, P McMahon (0-1f) 0-2 each, M Malone 0-1

March 14, 2010; Quarter Final	Kerry	0-19 - 1-08	Cork
March 14, 2010; Quarter Final	BJ Keane 0-7 (2f); BJ Walsh 0-4 (1 '45, 2f); P Geaney 0-4 (1f); J O'Donoghue 0-3; P O'Donoghue 0-1	Report	B O'Driscoll 1-2 (1f); C Sheehan 0-2; M Collins (f), J P Murphy, E Keane, J Sexton 0-1 each

=== Semi-final ===
March 18, 2010; Semi Final	Tipperary	0-16 - 2-05	Limerick	Semple Stadium; Referee: M Collins (Cork)
March 18, 2010; Semi Final	S Carey 0-7 (0-1f), B O'Brien, C Sweeney (0-1f) 0-3 each, P Acheson 0-2, G Ryan 0-1	Report	E O'Connor 0-4 (0-3f), J Riordan, D Ward 1-0 each, S O'Carroll 0-1	Semple Stadium; Referee: M Collins (Cork)

March 20, 2010; Semi Final	Kerry	1-18 - 0-03	Waterford	Dungarvan; Referee: Micheal Meade (Limerick)
March 20, 2010; Semi Final	P Geaney 1-5, BJ Walsh 0-4 (0-4f), B J Keane 0-3 (0-1f), J Lyne, J Buckley, J O'Donoghue, D Casey, E Walsh and P Curtin 0-1 each	Report	A Brophy 0-3 (0-3f)	Dungarvan; Referee: Micheal Meade (Limerick)

=== Final ===
March 31, 2010; Final	Tipperary	1-07 - 1-06	Kerry	Austin Stack Park; Attendance: 2.650; Referee: C Lane (Cork)
March 31, 2010; Final	B O'Brien 1-0, S Carey 0-2f, A Moloney 0-2 (1f), S Egan 0-2, C Sweeney 0-1f	Report	P Geaney 1-1, BJ Keane 0-2 f, BJ Walsh (f ), E Walsh and P Curtin 0-1 each	Austin Stack Park; Attendance: 2.650; Referee: C Lane (Cork)

== Connacht Under 21 Football Championship ==
=== Quarter-final ===
March 10, 2010	Leitrim	0-09 - 0-13	Mayo	Cloone
March 10, 2010	K Conlan, A Croal, E Ward 0-2 each, W McKeon, C McCauley, S Flanagan 0-1 each	Report	N Douglas, A Freeman 0-4 each, S Nally, A O'Shea 0-2 each, R Geraghty 0-1	Cloone

=== Semi-final ===
March 17, 2010; Semi Final	Galway	0-12 - 0-13	Sligo	Tuam Stadium; Referee: V Neary (Mayo)
March 17, 2010; Semi Final	P Conroy (0-2f); M Martin (0-2f) 0-3 each; T Walsh; D Cummins; J Ryan; E Monahan; R Gaffney; P O Fatharta (0-1f) 0-1 each	Report	David Maye 0-7 (0-6f), J Hynes 0-2; P Kelly, N Judge, A Dunne, J Clarke 0-1 each	Tuam Stadium; Referee: V Neary (Mayo)

March 17, 2010; Semi Final	Roscommon	2-09 - 1-11	Mayo	Dr Hyde Park; Referee: R McBrien (Leitrim).
March 17, 2010; Semi Final	B Murtagh 1-1, D Shine, P Garvey 0-3 (0-2f) each, N Kilroy 1-0, N Daly, K Higgins 0-1 each.	Report	N Douglas 0-7 (0-3f), A Freeman 1-1, J Doherty, S Nally, K McLoughlin 0-1 each.	Dr Hyde Park; Referee: R McBrien (Leitrim).

=== Final ===
April 3, 2010; Final	Sligo	0-04 - 1-06	Roscommon	Referee: V Neary (Mayo)
April 3, 2010; Final	D Maye 0-3 (2f, 1 '45), P Clarke 0-1	Report	A O'Hara 1-0; K Higgins, D Shine (2f) 0-2 each; N Kilroy, P Garvey (1f) 0-1 each	Referee: V Neary (Mayo)

== All-Ireland Semi Series ==
April 17, 2010; 7.30; Semi Final	Dublin	2-10 - 0-08	Roscommon	Kingspan, Breffni Park; Referee: C Branagan (Down)
April 17, 2010; 7.30; Semi Final	D Rock 1-2 (1f), D Quinn 1-0, R McCarthy 0-3, N Devereux, G Sweeney, B O'Rorke, C Mullins, C Dorney 0-1 each	Report	D Shine 0-4 (4f), N Carty, K Higgins, C Shine, D McDermott 0-1 each	Kingspan, Breffni Park; Referee: C Branagan (Down)

April 17, 2010; 7.30; Semi Final	Donegal	0-12 - 0-04	Tipperary	Parnell Park; Referee: D Brazil (Offaly)
April 17, 2010; 7.30; Semi Final	M Murphy 0-6 (3f), D Molloy 0-3 (1f), J Carroll 0-2, L McLoone 0-1	Report	S Carey 0-2 (1f), M O'Dwyer (1f), A Moloney 0-1 each	Parnell Park; Referee: D Brazil (Offaly)

May 01, 2010; 19:00; Final	Dublin	1-10 - 1-08	Donegal	Breffni Park/Kingspan; Referee: M Duffy (Sligo)
May 01, 2010; 19:00; Final	G Sweeney 1-1, D Rock 0-4 (0-2f, 0-1 '45), N Devereux, M Coughlan, R McCarthy, C Dorney, B O'Rorke 0-1 each.	Report	D Molloy 0-5 (4f), L McLoone 1-0, M Murphy 0-2 (0-1f), C Morrison 0-1.	Breffni Park/Kingspan; Referee: M Duffy (Sligo)
