= Fiontán Ó Curraoin =

Galway Gaelic footballer

Personal information
- Native name: Fiontán Ó Curraoin (Irish)
- Nickname: Funtan
- Born: 29 August 1992 (age 34) Galway, Ireland
- Occupation: Teacher
- Height: 1.9 m (6 ft 3 in)

Sport
- Sport: Gaelic football
- Position: Midfield
Club
- Years: Club
- 2009–: Míchael Breathnach
College
- Years: College
- DCU
College titles
- Sigerson titles: 1
Inter-county
Years	County	Apps (scores)
2011–2020	Galway	56 (2-04)
Inter-county titles
- Connacht titles: 2

Fiontán Ó Curraoin (born 29 August 1992 in Galway) is an Irish Gaelic footballer and teacher from Galway. Ó Curraoin plays his club football with Míchael Breathnach. He played at senior level for the Galway county team from 2011 onwards.

Ó Curraoin was a key part of Galway GAA's Under 21 All-Ireland wins of 2011 and 2013.

He won the Sigerson Cup with DCU in 2012.

Ó Curraoin injured himself while playing for Galway against Mayo in the FBD Insurance League in January 2020 and required hospital treatment.

Ó Curraoin withdrew from the Galway panel ahead of the 2021 season.

He is a teacher at Coláiste Bhaile Chláir in Claregalway.

== Honours ==
Galway

- Connacht Under-21 Football Championship (2): 2011, 2013
- All-Ireland Under-21 Football Championship (2): 2011, 2013
- Connacht Senior Football Championship (2): 2016, 2018

Achievements
Preceded by Kevin O'Brien (Dublin)	All-Ireland Under-21 Football Final winning captain 2013	Succeeded by Jack McCaffrey (Dublin)
