= DCU GAA =

University sports club in Dublin, Ireland

DCU GAA Club
- Cumann Luth Cleas Gael Ollscoil Chathair Bhaile Átha Cliath
- County: Dublin
- Colours: Gold and Navy
- Grounds: DCU Sports Campus; Ballymun Road

Playing kits
Standard colours

Dublin City University Gaelic Athletic Association Club (Irish: Cumann Luth Chleas Gael Ollscoil Chathair Bhaile Átha Cliath) is the GAA club at Dublin City University. The club fields teams in men's Gaelic football, hurling, ladies' Gaelic football and camogie. It also organises Gaelic handball. The club mainly competes in intervarsity competitions such as the Sigerson Cup, the Fitzgibbon Cup, the O'Connor Cup and the Ashbourne Cup. DCU has also entered competitions organised by the Leinster GAA, including the O'Byrne Cup, the Kehoe Cup and Walsh Cup. In 2016 St. Patrick's College, Drumcondra merged with Dublin City University. As a result some DCU GAA teams, especially reserve teams, compete as DCU St Patrick's or DCU Dóchas Éireann.

== Football ==
=== Sigerson Cup ===
DCU senior men's Gaelic football team compete in the Sigerson Cup, while the reserve team competes in the Trench Cup. In 2006, with a team that included Conor Mortimer, Bernard Brogan, Seánie Johnston, Declan Lally, Stephen Cluxton, Paul Casey and captained by Bryan Cullen, DCU won the Sigerson Cup for the first time after defeating Queen's University by 0–11 to 1–04 in the final at Parnell Park. Mortimer secured the cup for DCU after scoring three points in the last 15 minutes. In 2010, DCU won the Sigerson Cup for the second time, after defeating UCC by 1–11 by 0–10. The team was captained by Paddy Andrews and also featured Michael Boyle, Philly McMahon, Kevin Nolan, Jonny Cooper, Bryan Cullen, David Kelly, Paul Flynn and Cathal Cregg. In 2012, DCU won their third Sigerson Cup title in seven years following a 2–17 to 0–7 win over NUI Maynooth in the final. Dublin trio Paul Flynn, Dean Rock and Eoghan O'Gara scored 1–11 between them. Other members of the team included Michael Boyle, Jonny Cooper, James McCarthy, Colm Begley, Fiontán Ó Curraoin, David Kelly and Michael Murphy. In 2015, Begley captained DCU when they won their fourth Sigerson Cup, defeating UCC by 1–14 to 2–10 after extra time in the final. Begley was captaining the side in the absence of regular captain Tom Flynn and vice-captain Davey Byrne, after both men were ruled out with injuries.

Year	Winner	Score	Runners–up	Captain
2006	DCU	0–11;1–4	Queen's University	Bryan Cullen
2010	DCU	1–11;0–10	UCC	Paddy Andrews
2012	DCU	2–17;0–7	NUI Maynooth	Kieran Gavin
2015	DCU	1–14;2–10 (Note: After extra time.)	UCC	Colm Begley
2016	UCD	0–10;2–2	DCU	Colm Begley

=== O'Byrne Cup ===
DCU senior men's Gaelic football team have also competed in the O'Byrne Cup. In 2010, they became the first university team to win the cup.

Year	Winner	Score	Runners–up	Captain
2009	Louth	1–17;1–10	DCU	
2010	DCU	1–15;0–17	Louth	Paddy Andrews
2012	DCU	3–7;1–12	Kildare	Kieran Gavin

== Ladies' football ==
O'Connor Cup

DCU senior ladies' Gaelic football team compete in the O'Connor Cup. DCU have also entered reserve teams in the Giles Cup, the Lynch Cup and the Lagan Cup. In 2009, with a team that included Lyndsey Davey, DCU won the O'Connor Cup for the first time. They subsequently went on to complete a three-in-a-row of O'Connor Cup wins. Other members of the team from this era included Niamh McEvoy and Lindsay Peat. In 2018, Sarah Rowe scored 1–3 as DCU defeated University of Limerick by 2–12 to 0–17 to win the cup for the fourth time.

Year	Winner	Score	Runners–up	Captain
2009	DCU	2–11;1–13	University of Limerick	Fiona McHale
2010	DCU	2–12;0–12	University of Ulster, Jordanstown	Shannon Quinn
2011	DCU	3–8;1–11	University of Ulster, Jordanstown	Donna English
2013	Queen's University	4–10;1–9	DCU	
2015	University of Limerick	3–16;0–9	DCU	Laura McEnaney
2018	DCU	2–12;0–17	University of Limerick	Aishling Moloney
2023	DCU	3-13; 1-13	University of Limerick	Anna Rose Kennedy
2024	DCU	2-16;1-14	UCC	Emma Duggan
2025	DCU	2-11; 1-9	UCC	Emma Duggan

O'Connor Shield

Year	Winner	Score	Runners–up	Captain
2019	DCU	3–18;0–6	NUI Galway	Laura McGinley

HEC Ladies Division 1 – O'Rourke Cup

DCU senior ladies' Gaelic football team also compete in the HEC Ladies Division 1. The winners are awarded the O'Rourke Cup.

Year	Winner	Score	Runners–up	Captain
2008	University of Ulster, Jordanstown		DCU	
2011	DCU		University of Limerick	
2012	DCU		University of Ulster, Jordanstown	
2014	University of Limerick		DCU	
2015	DCU		UCD	
2017	DCU		University of Limerick	
2019	University of Limerick	3–10;1–7	DCU	Ciara Finnegan
2021	DCU	beat	University of Limerick	Anna Rose Kennedy
2022	DCU	beat	University of Limerick	Anna Rose Kennedy
2023	DCU	beat	UCC	Emma Duggan
2024	DCU	beat	UCC	Emma Duggan

Giles Cup

Year	Winner	Score	Runners–up	Captain
2017	DCU II	3–7;0–14	Athlone IT	Aoife Norris
2018	Waterford IT	4–16;0–8	DCU II	

Lynch Cup

The DCU senior ladies' team initially found success in the Lynch Cup, winning it in 2004 and 2006 before gaining promotion to the O'Connor Cup.

Year	Winner	Score	Runners–up	Captain
2004	DCU		Athlone IT	
2006	DCU		Liverpool Hope University	
2010	Mary Immaculate College		DCU II	
2011	Carlow IT	2–11;1–3	DCU II	
2015	DCU II	2–13;1–10	DIT	Fiona O'Sullivan

Lagan Cup

Year	Winner	Score	Runners–up	Captain
2019	Ulster University at Magee		DCU II	Rachel Hogan

== Hurling ==
DCU senior hurling team competes in the Fitzgibbon Cup, the Kehoe Cup and the Walsh Cup. DCU have also entered reserve teams in the Ryan Cup.

Kehoe Cup Shield

Year	Winner	Score	Runners–up
2019	Louth	1–18;0–14	DCU St Patrick's Campus (Note: In 2016, St Patrick's College, Drumcondra merged with Dublin City University. Some DCU GAA teams still use the St Patrick's or Dóchas Éireann names.)

Notes

Fitzgibbon Cup

Year	Winner	Score	Runners–up
2018	University of Limerick	2–21;2–15	DCU

Ryan Cup

Year	Winner	Score	Runners–up
1998	DCU	3–8;2–8	Limerick Institute of Technology
2002	DCU	1–13;0–11	St Patrick's College, Drumcondra
2010	Carlow IT	1–12;0–13	DCU

Fergal Maher Cup

Year	Winner	Score	Runners–up
1988	NIHE Dublin (Note: NIHE Dublin is the original name of Dublin City University.)		(Note: Dundalk RTC or Magee College.)

== Camogie ==
DCU senior camogie team competes in the Ashbourne Cup. DCU have also entered reserve teams in the Purcell Cup.

Purcell Cup

Year	Winner	Score	Runners–up	Captain
2011	Queen's University	2–10;0–7	DCU	Laura Twomey
2012	DCU	4–7;0–4	Queen's University	Laura Twomey
2013	DCU	2–11;1–9	Mary Immaculate College	Emma Brennan

== Handball ==
DCU Gaelic handballers compete in competitions such as the Wexford Intervarsity, the Kilkenny Intervarsity, the Kingscourt Intervarsity and Dublin Leagues. Training takes place in DCU Sports Centre and at CLG Na Fianna.

== Notable players ==
=== Senior inter-county players ===
Football
Dublin

- Paddy Andrews
- Denis Bastick
- Bernard Brogan
- Paul Casey
- Shane Carthy
- Paddy Christie
- Stephen Cluxton
- Jonny Cooper
- Evan Comerford
- Cormac Costello
- Bryan Cullen
- Paul Flynn
- Ciarán Kilkenny
- Declan Lally
- James McCarthy
- Philly McMahon
- Kevin Nolan
- Eoghan O'Gara
- Tomás Quinn
- Dean Rock
- Ian Robertson
- Shane Ryan
- Jason Sherlock
- John Small

Mayo

- Paddy Durcan
- Rob Hennelly
- Conor Mortimer
- Cillian O'Connor
- Diarmuid O'Connor
- Conor Loftus

Roscommon

- Cathal Cregg
- David Keenan
- Donal Shine
- Enda Smith
- Donal Smith

Donegal

- Michael Boyle
- Brendan McCole
- Martin McElhinney
- Conor Morrison
- Michael Murphy

Cavan

- Seánie Johnston
- John Tierney

Cork

- Seán Óg Ó hAilpín
- Aidan Walsh

Galway

- Tom Flynn
- Fiontán Ó Curraoin

Laois

- Stephen Attride
- Colm Begley
- Ross Munnelly

Kildare

- Seánie Johnston

Louth

- Dan Corcoran
- Paddy Keenan

Meath

- Anthony Moyles

Sligo

- David Kelly

Ladies' football
Dublin

- Rachel Barrett
- Leah Caffrey
- Lucy Collins
- Lyndsey Davey
- Sinead Finnegan
- Kate Fitzgibbon
- C. J. Hogan
- Fiona Hudson
- Lauren Magee
- Laura McGinley
- Ciara McGuinness
- Eimear McGlade
- Niamh McEvoy
- Ciara Mulligan
- Deirdre Murphy
- Emer Ní Eafa
- Clíodhna O'Connor
- Sinead O'Mahony
- Lindsay Peat
- Eabha Ruitleas
- Siobhan Woods

Mayo

- Niamh Kelly
- Fiona McHale
- Sarah Rowe
- Aisling Tarpey

Tipperary

- Aisling Maloney

Hurling
Dublin

- Eoghan O'Donnell
- Shane Ryan

Wexford

- Conor Firman
- Paudie Foley
- Rory O'Connor
- Damien Reck
- Andrew Shore

Kilkenny

- Conor Delaney
- John Donnelly
- Evan Shefflin

Clare

- Teu Ó hAilpín

Cork

- Seán Óg Ó hAilpín

Galway

- Brian Flaherty

Laois

- Darren Rooney

Waterford

- Peter Hogan

Handballers

- Derek Henry
- Eoin Kennedy

=== Ireland internationals ===
Men's international rules

- Colm Begley
- Bernard Brogan
- Stephen Cluxton
- Cathal Cregg
- Bryan Cullen
- Paul Flynn
- Paddy Keenan
- James McCarthy
- Anthony Moyles
- Ross Munnelly
- Michael Murphy
- Seán Óg Ó hAilpín
- Shane Ryan
- Enda Smith

Australian rules football

- John Tierney

Shinty–hurling international

- Seán Óg Ó hAilpín

Women's international rules

- Clíodhna O'Connor

Women's rugby union

- (Ireland) Lindsay Peat

== Honours ==
Football

- Sigerson Cup
  - Winners: 2006, 2010, 2012, 2015, 2020, 2025
  - Runners Up: 2016
- O'Byrne Cup
  - Winners: 2010, 2012
  - Runners Up: 2009

Ladies' football

- O'Connor Cup
  - Winners: 2009, 2010, 2011, 2018
  - Runners Up: 2015
- O'Connor Shield
  - Runners Up: 2019
- HEC Ladies Division 1 – O'Rourke Cup
  - Winners: 2011, 2012, 2015, 2017
  - Runners Up: 2008, 2014, 2019
- Giles Cup
  - Winners: 2017
  - Runners Up: 2018
- Lynch Cup
  - Winners: 2004, 2006, 2015
  - Runners Up: 2010, 2011
- Lagan Cup
  - Runners Up: 2019

Hurling

- Ryan Cup
  - Winners: 1998, 2002
- Fergal Maher Cup
  - Winners: 1988
- Fitzgibbon Cup
  - Runners Up: 2018
- Kehoe Cup Shield
  - Runners Up: 2019

Camogie

- Purcell Cup
  - Winners: 2012, 2013
  - Runners Up: 2011, 2015
