= Davey Byrne (Dublin footballer) =

Irish Gaelic footballer

Personal information
- Born: Dublin, Ireland

Sport
- Sport: Gaelic football
- Position: Midfielder
Club
- Years: Club
- Ballymun Kickhams
College
- Years: College
- Dublin City University
College titles
- Sigerson titles: 1
Inter-county
- Years: County
- Dublin
Inter-county titles
- NFL: 1

David Byrne is an Irish former Gaelic football player.

Byrne played his club football for Ballymun Kickhams and represented Dublin at inter-county level. Byrne also attended Dublin City University, where he played for the college's senior football team, and was a member of the Sigerson Cup-winning side of 2015. He is best known for being involved in a pre-match incident with an Armagh player, which resulted in a brawl and saw him hospitalised with facial injuries, later revealed by manager Jim Gavin to be a broken nose. He left the panel shortly afterwards and returned to Ballymun. Bryne has since gone into coaching and is part of the DCU management team, winning two Sigerson Cups in 2020 and 2025.
