= Paddy Andrews (Gaelic footballer) =

Irish Gaelic football player

Personal information
- Native name: Pádraig Mac Aindriú (Irish)
- Born: 18 July 1988 (age 38) Dublin, Ireland

Sport
- Sport: Gaelic football
- Position: Full Forward
Club
- Years: Club
- 2006–: St Brigid's
Club titles
- Dublin titles: 1
College
- Years: College
- DCU
College titles
- Sigerson titles: 1
Inter-county
Years	County	Apps (scores)
2008–2020	Dublin	31 (1-36)
Inter-county titles
- Leinster titles: 9
- All-Irelands: 7
- NFL: 5
- All Stars: 0

Paddy Andrews (born 18 July 1988) is a Gaelic footballer who plays for St Brigid's and previously with the Dublin county team. He has been on the Dublin football panel since January 2008. He is the younger brother of former Dublin footballer Peadar Andrews. He won a Sigerson Cup medal with DCU in 2010.

On 17 August 2011, Andrews signed for Monaghan United in the League of Ireland First Division.

Andrews won the Dublin Senior Football Championship with St Brigid's in 2011.

Andrews won the all-Ireland senior football championship with Dublin in September 2013 at Croke Park against Mayo.

Following the completion of the five-in-row in 2019, Andrews spent a week in New York with Ciarán Kilkenny and Dean Rock.

In January 2021, Andrews announced his retirement from inter-county football after 12 years.
