= Cooley Kickhams G.F.C. =

Louth-based Gaelic games club

Cooley Kickhams
- Ciceim Cúailgne
- Founded: 1887
- County: Louth
- Colours: Green, Gold and White
- Grounds: Father McEvoy Park, Monksland, Carlingford
- Coordinates: 54.0101°N 6.1693°W

Playing kits
Standard colours

Senior Club Championships
	All Ireland	Leinster champions	Louth champions
Football:	-	-	9

Cooley Kickhams Gaelic Football Club is a Gaelic football and ladies' Gaelic football club based on the Cooley Peninsula, County Louth, Ireland.

== History ==
The club is named after the Cooley Peninsula on which it stands and was founded in 1887. That year the club (then known as Cooley Independents) was granted the use of a field for matches by the Reverend Hugh Murphy P.P. The name "Cooley Kickhams" was chosen in 1905 and honours the nationalist and writer Charles Kickham (1828–1882). The Brown Bull of Cooley is featured on the club's crest.

The club grounds, named Fr. McEvoy Park, are near to Greenore and Carlingford. They were opened in 1969 by GAA President Séamus Ó Riain.

In 1973 and 1976 they reached the final of the Leinster Senior Club Football Championship.

The ladies' team reached the final of the 2001 Leinster Ladies' Senior Club Football Championship.

== Notable players ==
Eddie Boyle

- Con Cottrell, also a Cork hurler
- Joseph Ferguson, executed during the Irish Civil War
- Neil Gallagher
- Rob Kearney, former professional rugby player
- Jimmy Magee, commentator and journalist (honorary member)
- Pádraig O'Neill
- Sean O'Neill
- Brian White
- Stephen White
- Cormac Breslin - former Donegal county footballer. Transferred to Louth and played in early rounds of 1957 Leinster Senior Football Championship.

== Football honours ==
- Louth Senior Football Championship (9): 1935, 1939, 1971, 1973, 1976, 1977, 1978, 1989, 1990
- Louth Senior Football League (Cardinal O'Donnell Cup) (15): 1936, 1937, 1966, 1967, 1970, 1972, 1974, 1976, 1979, 1983, 1989, 2004, 2006, 2007, 2008
- Senior subsidiary winners (ACC Cup) (4): 1984, 1987, 1998, 2003
- Senior subsidiary winners (Old Gaels Cup) (7): 1965, 1967, 1968, 1969, 1971, 1973, 1974
- Senior subsidiary winners (Paddy Sheelan Cup) (4): 2004, 2005, 2006, 2014
- Louth Intermediate Football Championship (2): 1907, 2022
- Louth Intermediate Football League (1): 2015
- Louth Junior Football Championship (4): 1916, 1934, 1947, 1964
- Louth Junior A Football League (3): 1932, 1964, 1968
- Louth Junior 2A Football Championship (9): 1980, 1991, 1992, 2000, 2001, 2002, 2007, 2009, 2021
- Louth Junior 2A Football League (11): 1944, 1990, 1993, 1998, 2001, 2002, 2005, 2008, 2011, 2015, 2021
- Louth Junior 2B Football Championship (1): 2011
- Louth Under-21 Football Championship (3): 1972, 1982, 2016
- Louth Minor Football Championship (8): 1968, 1971, 1979, 1984, 1998, 2005, 2006, 2020
- Louth Minor B Football Championship (1): 2013
