= Neil Gallagher (Louth footballer) =

Irish sportsperson (born 1985)

Personal information
- Native name: Niall Ó Gallchobhair (Irish)
- Born: 20 January 1985 (age 41) Daisy Hill Hospital, Newry, Northern Ireland
- Height: 6 ft 1 in (185 cm)

Sport
- Sport: Gaelic football
- Position: Goalkeeper
Club
- Years: Club
- Cooley Kickhams
Inter-county
- Years: County
- 2010–2018: Louth

Neil Gallagher
Personal information
- Full name: Neil Gallagher
- Date of birth: 20 January 1985 (age 41)
- Place of birth: Daisy Hill Hospital, Newry, Northern Ireland
- Height: 1.85 m (6 ft 1 in)
- Position: Goalkeeper

Youth career
- Bellurgan United FC

Senior career*
Years	Team	Apps	(Gls)
2002–2003	Dundalk	0	(0)
2003–2006	UCD	18	(0)
2006	→ Dundalk (loan)	8	(0)
2006–2007	Dundalk	18	(0)
2008	Longford Town	26	(0)
2009	Dundalk	0	(0)
2010	Newry City	1	(0)
- * Club domestic league appearances and goals

Neil Gallagher is an Irish sportsperson. He plays Gaelic football for Cooley Kickhams and is a former inter-county goalkeeper with Louth. He also played soccer for Dundalk, UCD and Longford Town in the League of Ireland.

Born in Newry, County Down, Gallagher was the Louth Minor team goalkeeper in 2003. The side narrowly failed to reach a Leinster Final. His soccer career began with local amateur side Bellurgan United and he won Leinster and All-Ireland honours playing for his school St. Mary's College. While at school he also won a Leinster Colleges Senior Football Championship.

On completion of his secondary education, he was awarded a scholarship by UCD.

By 2010 he had established himself as the Louth senior inter-county goalkeeper. He featured on the team that contested the 2010 Leinster Senior Football Championship Final, when Louth were beaten in controversial circumstances by Meath.

In 2016, Gallagher was a member of the management team of the successful Cooley Kickhams under-21 side that defeated Geraldines in the Championship final on a scoreline of 3–07 to 8 points.

== Honours ==
County

- National Football League Division 3 (1): 2011
- National Football League Division 4 (1): 2016

Club

- Cardinal O'Donnell Cup (3): 2004, 2006, 2007
- ACC Cup (4): 2004, 2005, 2006, 2014
- Louth Intermediate Football Championship (1): 2022
- Louth Intermediate Football League (1): 2015

School

- Leinster Colleges Senior Football Championship (1): 2002
- Leinster Schools U-18 Senior Cup (1): 2002
- All-Ireland U-15 Colleges Championship (1): 2000
