= 2003 All-Ireland Senior Ladies' Football Championship final =

2003 All-Ireland Senior Ladies' Football Final
- Event: 2003 All-Ireland Senior Ladies' Football Championship
Mayo	Dublin
1–4	0–5
- Mayo retain the title, winning their fourth final in five years. Dublin make their debut.
- Date: 5 October 2003
- Venue: Croke Park, Dublin
- Player of the Match: Diane O'Hora

The 2003 TG4 All-Ireland Senior Ladies' Football Championship Final featured Mayo and Dublin. Mayo defeated Dublin in a low scoring game. Mayo retained the title, winning their fourth final in five years, while Dublin were making their debut appearance. Dublin led 0–4 to 0–2 at half-time. Two minutes from full-time Mayo trailed Dublin by a point. However the match was decided thanks to a late goal from Player of the Match, Diane O'Hora. Cora Staunton dropped a last-minute long range free-kick into the square. The Dublin goalkeeper, Clíodhna O'Connor, failed to gain control of the ball, allowing O'Hora to score. In July 2003, Aisling McGing, a member of Mayo's 2002 winning team, was killed in a car crash. She was travelling to watch her two sisters, Michelle and Sharon McGing, play for Mayo against Galway in a Connacht Championship game. Just three months later, Michelle and Sharon McGing played for Mayo in the All-Ireland final.

== Match info ==
5 October 2003

Mayo	1–4; 0–5	Dublin
E. Mullins (0-1); Michelle McGing (0-1); Diane O'Hora (1-2)		Angie McNally (0-1); Gemma Fay (0-1); Mary Nevin (0-1); K. Hopkins (0-1); Sinéad Aherne (0-1)

Croke Park, Dublin

== Teams ==
Manager: Finbar Egan Team: 1 Denise Horan; 2 Nuala O'Shea; 3 Helena Lohan (c); 4 Sharon McGing; 5 Mary T. Garvey; 6 Yvonne Byrne; 7 Claire O'Hara; 8 Clare Egan; 9 Jackie Moran; 10 E. Mullins; 11 Cora Staunton; 12 Michelle McGing; 13 Diane O'Hora; 14 Marcella Heffernan; 15 Christina Heffernan Substitutes: A. Gallagher for Moran (39 mins)	Manager: Mick Bohan Team: 1 Clíodhna O'Connor; 2 Sorcha Farrelly; 3 Louise Keegan; 4 Maria Kavanagh; 5 Niamh Hurley; 6 Martina Farrell (c); 7 Orla Colreavy; 8 Angie McNally; 9 Niamh McEvoy; 10 E. Murphy; 11 Gemma Fay; 12 Bernie Finlay; 13 Mary Nevin; 14 Louise Kelly; 15 K. Hopkins Substitutes: Elaine Kelly for Murphy (28); Aisling McCormack for Hopkins (43); Sinéad Aherne for Finlay (45)
