= 2004 All-Ireland Senior Ladies' Football Championship final =

2004 All-Ireland Senior Ladies' Football Final
- Event: 2004 All-Ireland Senior Ladies' Football Championship
Galway	Dublin
3–8	0–11
- Galway win their first title
- Date: 3 October 2004
- Venue: Croke Park, Dublin
- Referee: Eugene O'Hara (Down)
- Attendance: 20,706

The 2004 TG4 All-Ireland Senior Ladies' Football Championship Final featured Galway and Dublin. Dublin started the stronger and led by six points after twenty five minutes thanks mainly to points from Angie McNally and Mary Nevin. Galway made some changes that proved crucial. However a Niamh Duggan goal and a point from Annette Clarke kept Galway in touch. At half-time Dublin led with the score at 0–7 to 1–2. In the second half, Galway took charge after Clarke scored their second goal with an assist from Gillian Joyce. Nevin and McNally replied with further points for Dublin while Lisa Cohill and Gillian Joyce kept Galway ahead. 18 year old Edel Concannon's goal eight minutes from time proved to be the decisive score that won the title for Galway.

== Match info ==
3 October 2004

Galway	3–8; 0–11	Dublin
Annette Clarke (1-3); Edel Concannon (1-0); Niamh Duggan (1-0); Gillian Joyce (0-3); Lisa Cohill (0-2); M. Delaney (0-1)		Mary Nevin (0-3); Angie McNally (0-3); Fiona Corcoran (0-1); Bernie Finlay (0-1); Lyndsey Davey (0-1); Ashling McCormack (0-1); K. Hopkins (0-1)

Croke Park, Dublin
Attendance: 20,706
Referee: Eugene O'Hara (Down)

== Teams ==
Manager: P. J. Fahy Team: 1 Una Carroll; 2 Marie O'Connell; 3 Ruth Stephens; 4 Ann-Marie McDonagh; 5 Aoibheann Daly; 6 Áine Gilmore; 7 Emer Flaherty; 8 Annette Clarke (c); 9 Patricia Gleeson; 10 Lisa Cohill; 11 Niamh Fahey; 12 Niamh Duggan; 13 Geraldine Conneally; 14 Lorna Joyce; 15 M. Delaney Substitutes: Edel Concannon for Gilmore (23); Gillian Joyce for Delaney (HT); M. Burke for O'Connell (53); F. Wynne for Conneally (58); E. O'Malley for Gleeson (60)	Manager: John O'Leary Team: 1 Clíodhna O'Connor; 2 Sorcha Farrelly; 3 Noelle Comyn; 4 Maria Kavanagh; 5 Niamh McEvoy; 6 Louise Keegan; 7 Gemma Fay; 8 Martina Farrell; 9 Fiona Corcoran; 10 Elaine Kelly; 11 Bernie Finlay; 12 Lyndsey Davey; 13 Ashling McCormack; 14 Angie McNally; 15 Mary Nevin Substitutes: Louise Kelly for Kavanagh (43); Sinéad Aherne for Kelly (47); S. McGrath for Farrelly (49); K. Hopkins for Davey (54); Orla Colreavy for Farrell (58)
