= HEC O'Connor Cup =

Ladies' Gaelic football intervarsity competition

- Current season or competition: 2026 HEC O'Connor Cup
- Irish: Corn Uí Chonchúir
- Code: Ladies' Gaelic football
- Founded: 1987
- Region: Republic of Ireland; Northern Ireland (GAA)
- Trophy: Michael O'Connor Cup
- Title holders: University of Limerick (12th title)
- Most titles: University of Limerick (12 titles)
- Sponsors: Gourmet Food Parlour; Irish Examiner
- TV partner: TG4
- Official website: www.helgfa.com

The HEC O'Connor Cup, also referred to as the Michael O'Connor Cup, is the senior Ladies' Gaelic football intervarsity cup competition. It features teams representing universities and institutes of technology from the Republic of Ireland and Northern Ireland. It is organised by the Higher Education Colleges committee of the Ladies' Gaelic Football Association. Mary Immaculate College won the inaugural competition in 1987. University of Limerick is the competition's most successful team. Since 2018 the O'Connor Cup has been sponsored by Gourmet Food Parlour. It was previously sponsored by the Irish Examiner. During the 2010s, the O'Connor Cup final has been broadcast live by TG4 and/or YouTube. Since 1993 teams knocked out in the early rounds of the O'Connor Cup have subsequently competed in the consolation competition, the O'Connor Shield.

== Finals ==
Year	Winner	Score	Runners–up	Host
1987	Mary Immaculate College		UCC	
1988	UCC		Mary Immaculate College	
1989	Waterford RTC		Mary Immaculate College	
1990	UCC		Mary Immaculate College	
1991	Thomond College		Mary Immaculate College	
1992	Mary Immaculate College		Thomond College	
1993	University of Limerick		Mary Immaculate College	
1994	University of Limerick		Waterford RTC	
1995	University of Limerick		Garda Síochána College	
1996	University of Limerick		UUJ	
1997	University of Limerick		Garda Síochána College	
1998	IT Tralee		IT Sligo	
1999	IT Tralee		UCD	
2000	IT Sligo		Waterford IT	
2001	UCD	2–8;0–5	IT Tralee	Templemore
2002	UCD		University of Limerick	
2003	UCD		UUJ	
2004	University of Limerick	4–9;2–8	NUI Maynooth	NUI Galway
2005	UCD		NUI Galway	
2006	UCD		IT Sligo	
2007	University of Limerick		UUJ	
2008	UUJ	0–14;1–3	IT Sligo	NUI Galway
2009	DCU	2–11;1–13	University of Limerick	UUJ
2010	DCU	2–12;0–12	UUJ	DCU
2011	DCU	3–8;1–11	UUJ	University of Limerick
2012	UCC	2–14;1–13	UUJ	Queen's University
2013	Queen's University	4–10;1–9	DCU	Waterford IT
2014	University of Limerick	3–7;1–9	Queen's University	Queen's University
2015	University of Limerick	3–16;0–9	DCU	Cork Institute of Technology
2016	UCD	1–7;0–9	University of Limerick	IT Tralee
2017	University of Limerick	2–5;0–8	UCC	MacHale Park
2018	DCU	2–12;0–17	University of Limerick	Abbotstown
2019	University of Limerick	2–16;1–10	UCD	DIT Grangegorman
2020	Not Played Due to Covid			
2021	Not Played Due to Covid			
2022	University of Limerick	0-12; 0-11	UCC	DCU
2023	DCU	3-14; 1-13	University of Limerick	NUI Galway Connacht Centre of Excellence Airdome
2024	DCU	2-16; 2-14	UCC	MTU Cork, Bishopstown
2025	DCU	2-11; 1-9	UCC	The Dub Arena, QUB
2026	TU Dublin		DCU	

== Winners by team ==
Winner	Years	Total Titles
University of Limerick/Thomond College	1991, 1993, 1994, 1995, 1996, 1997, 2004, 2007, 2014, 2015, 2017, 2019, 2022	13
DCU	2009, 2010, 2011, 2018, 2023, 2024, 2025	7
UCD	2001, 2001, 2003, 2005, 2006, 2016	6
UCC	1988, 1990, 2012	3
Mary Immaculate College	1987, 1992	2
IT Tralee	1998, 1999	2
University of Ulster, Jordanstown	2008	1
Queen's University	2013	1
IT Sligo	2000	1
Waterford RTC/Waterford IT	1989	1

== O'Connor Shield ==
Since 1993 teams knocked out in the early rounds of the O'Connor Cup have subsequently competed in the consolation competition, the Micheal O'Connor Shield. In 2019 the Shield was effectively a 5th/6th place play-off.
