= All-Ireland Senior Ladies' Football Championship =

Irish Gaelic football contest

- Current season or competition: 2026 All-Ireland Senior Ladies' Football Championship
- Irish: Craobh Shinsear Peile na mBan na hÉireann
- Founded: 1974
- Trophy: Brendan Martin Cup
- Title holders: Galway (2nd title)
- Most titles: Kerry (12 titles)
- Sponsors: TG4

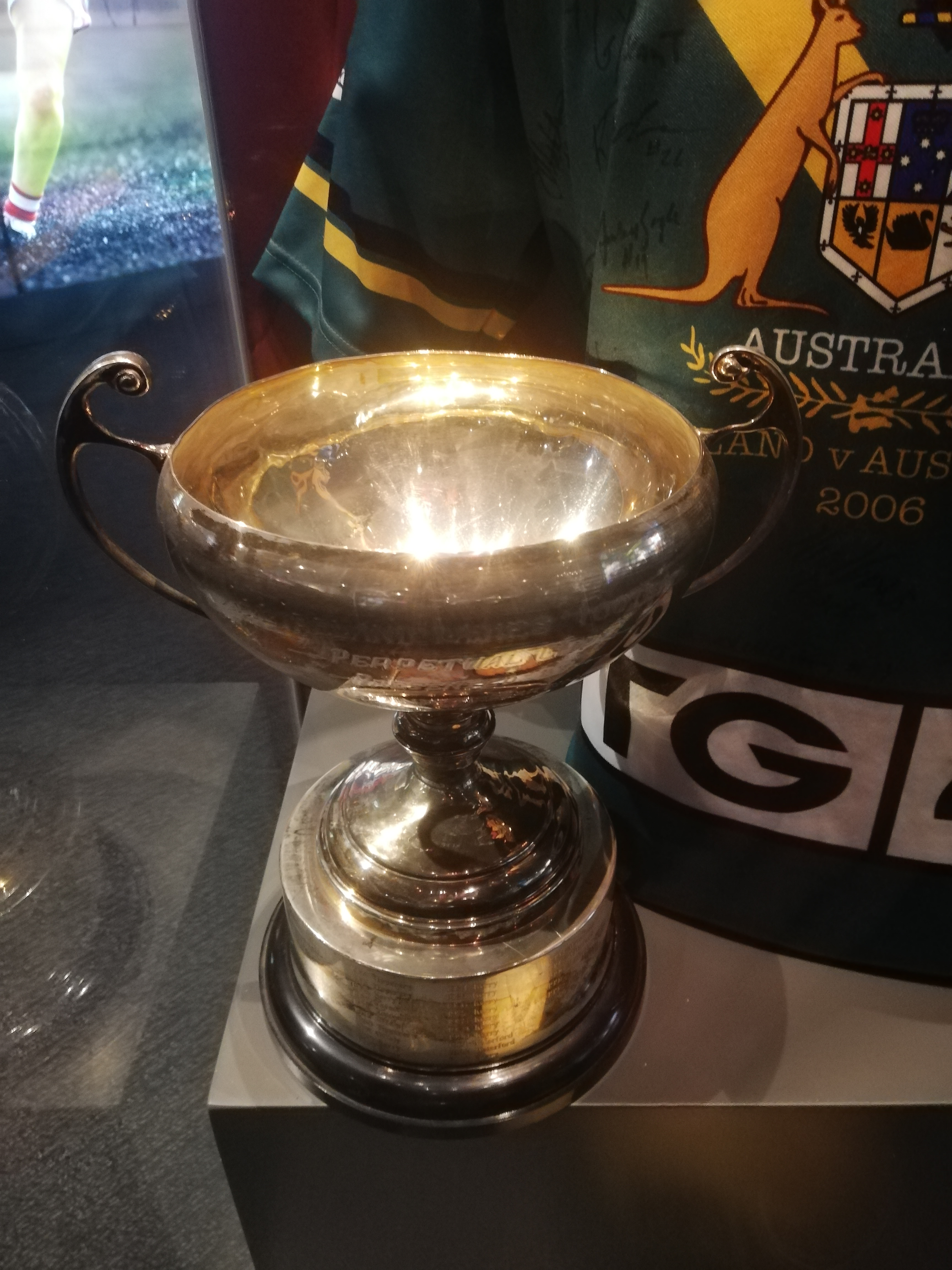
The Brendan Martin Cup

The All-Ireland Senior Ladies' Football Championship (Irish: Craobh Shinsir Peile na mBan in Éirinn) is the premier inter-county competition in the game of ladies' Gaelic football in Ireland. The series of games are organised by the Ladies' Gaelic Football Association and are played during the summer months, with the All-Ireland Final being played at Croke Park. The qualifiers were introduced in 2008.

The winning team is presented with the Brendan Martin Cup (Irish: Corn Bhreandáin Uí Mháirtín). The cup is named after Brendan Martin, a native of Tullamore, County Offaly, who organised Ladies' Gaelic football games in the early 1970s and became one of the first treasurers of the newly founded Ladies' Gaelic Football Association. He died in 2024.

== Teams ==
=== 2026 Championship ===
County	Province	Championship titles	Last championship title	Position in 2025 championship	Last provincial title
Armagh	Ulster	0	—	Group stage	2026
Cork	Munster	11	2016	Quarter-finals	2023
Donegal	Ulster	0	—	Group stage	2023
Dublin	Leinster	7	2025	Champions	2026
Galway	Connacht	1	2004	Semi-finals	2026
Kerry	Munster	12	2024	Semi-finals	2026
Kildare	Leinster	0	—	Quarter-finals	—
Mayo	Connacht	4	2003	Group stage	2023
Meath	Leinster	2	2022	Runners-up	—
Tipperary	Munster	3	1980	Quarter-finals	—
Tyrone	Ulster	0	—	Champions (Intermediate Championship)	—
Waterford	Munster	5	1998	Quarter-finals	—

=== 2026 Tiers ===
Championship	County team	Province
Senior	Armagh	Ulster
Senior	Cork	Munster
Senior	Donegal	Ulster
Senior	Dublin	Leinster
Senior	Galway	Connacht
Senior	Kerry	Munster
Senior	Kildare	Leinster
Senior	Mayo	Connacht
Senior	Meath	Leinster
Senior	Tipperary	Munster
Senior	Tyrone	Ulster
Senior	Waterford	Munster
Intermediate	Cavan	Ulster
Intermediate	Clare	Munster
Intermediate	Down	Ulster
Intermediate	Fermanagh	Ulster
Intermediate	Laois	Leinster
Intermediate	Leitrim	Connacht
Intermediate	Louth	Leinster
Intermediate	Monaghan	Ulster
Intermediate	Roscommon	Connacht
Intermediate	Westmeath	Leinster
Intermediate	Wexford	Leinster
Intermediate	Wicklow	Leinster
Junior	Antrim	Ulster
Junior	Carlow	Leinster
Junior	Derry	Ulster
Junior	Kilkenny	Leinster
Junior	Limerick	Munster
Junior	London	Britain
Junior	Longford	Leinster
Junior	Offaly	Leinster
Junior	Sligo	Connacht

== Finals ==
Season	Winner	Score	Runners–up	Venue	Attendance
1974	Tipperary	2-3 – 2-2	Offaly	Durrow, County Laois	
1975	Tipperary	1-4 – 0-0	Galway	Geraldine Park, Athy	700
1976	Kerry	4-6 – 1-5	Offaly	Littleton, County Tipperary	
1977	Cavan	4-3 – 2-3	Roscommon	Durrow, County Laois	3,000
1978	Roscommon	2-3 – 0-5	Tipperary	Dr. Hyde Park, Roscommon	
1979	Offaly	2-6 – 3-3	Tipperary	The Heath, Portlaoise	
1979	Offaly	3-6 – 1-6	Tipperary	McCann Park, Portarlington	
1980	Tipperary	1-1 – 0-1	Cavan	Edenderry	
1981	Offaly	1-11 – 4-0	Cavan	Dr. Hyde Park, Roscommon	
1982	Kerry	1-8 – 1-2	Offaly	MacDonagh Park, Nenagh	
1983	Kerry	4-6 – 1-7	Wexford	Kilsheelan	
1984	Kerry	0-5 – 0-3	Leitrim	Páirc Mochua, Timahoe	
1985	Kerry	2-9 – 0-5	Laois	Páirc Uí Chaoimh, Cork	5,000
1986	Kerry	1-11 – 0-8	Wexford	Croke Park, Dublin	
1987	Kerry	2-10 – 2-2	Westmeath	Croke Park, Dublin	
1988	Kerry	2-12 – 3-3	Laois	Croke Park, Dublin	
1989	Kerry	1-14 – 1-5	Wexford	Croke Park, Dublin	
1990	Kerry	1-9 – 0-6	Laois	Croke Park, Dublin	
1991	Waterford	5-8 – 3-7	Laois	Croke Park, Dublin	
1992	Waterford	2-10 – 3-4	Laois	Croke Park, Dublin	
1993	Kerry	4-8 – 2-6	Laois	Croke Park, Dublin	
1994	Waterford	2-10 – 0-12	Monaghan	Croke Park, Dublin	
1995	Waterford	4-14 – 1-5	Monaghan	Croke Park, Dublin	
1996	Monaghan	2-9 – 2-9	Laois	Croke Park, Dublin	
1996	Monaghan	2-15 – 1-9	Laois	Croke Park, Dublin	
1997	Monaghan	2-15 – 1-16	Waterford	Croke Park, Dublin	
1998	Waterford	1-16 – 4-7	Monaghan	Croke Park, Dublin	16,421
1998	Waterford	2-14 – 3-8	Monaghan	Croke Park, Dublin	13,551
1999	Mayo	0-12 – 1-8	Waterford	Croke Park, Dublin	15,000
2000	Mayo	3-6 – 0-14	Waterford	Croke Park, Dublin	
2001	Laois	2-14 – 1-16	Mayo	Croke Park, Dublin	
2002	Mayo	0-12 – 1-8	Monaghan	Croke Park, Dublin	
2003	Mayo	1-4 – 0-5	Dublin	Croke Park, Dublin	
2004	Galway	3-8 – 0-11	Dublin	Croke Park, Dublin	
2005	Cork	1-11 – 0-8	Galway	Croke Park, Dublin	23,358
2006	Cork	1-7 – 1-6	Armagh	Croke Park, Dublin	
2007	Cork	2-11 – 2-6	Mayo	Croke Park, Dublin	
2008	Cork	4-13 – 0-11	Monaghan	Croke Park, Dublin	20,015
2009	Cork	1-9 – 0-11	Dublin	Croke Park, Dublin	21,606
2010	Dublin	3-16 – 0-9	Tyrone	Croke Park, Dublin	21,750
2011	Cork	2-7 – 0-11	Monaghan	Croke Park, Dublin	20,061
2012	Cork	0-16 – 0-7	Kerry	Croke Park, Dublin	16,998
2013	Cork	1-10 – 1-9	Monaghan	Croke Park, Dublin	25,103
2014	Cork	2-13 – 2-12	Dublin	Croke Park, Dublin	27,374
2015	Cork	0-12 – 0-10	Dublin	Croke Park, Dublin	31,083
2016	Cork	1-7 – 1-6	Dublin	Croke Park, Dublin	34,445
2017	Dublin	4-11 – 0-11	Mayo	Croke Park, Dublin	46,286
2018	Dublin	3-11 – 1-12	Cork	Croke Park, Dublin	50,141
2019	Dublin	2-3 – 0-4	Galway	Croke Park, Dublin	56,114
2020	Dublin	1-10 – 1-5	Cork	Croke Park, Dublin	0
2021	Meath	1-11 – 0-12	Dublin	Croke Park, Dublin	32,000
2022	Meath	3-10 – 1-7	Kerry	Croke Park, Dublin	46,440
2023	Dublin	0-18 – 1-10	Kerry	Croke Park, Dublin	46,000
2024	Kerry	3-14 – 0-11	Galway	Croke Park, Dublin	30,340
2025	Dublin	2-16 – 0-10	Meath	Croke Park, Dublin	48,089
2026	Galway	2-07 – 0-12	Kerry	Croke Park, Dublin	26,471

== Roll of honour ==
=== All-Ireland Senior Ladies' Football Championship ===
#	County	Wins	Runners-up	Years won	Years Runners-up
1	Kerry	12	4	1976, 1982, 1983, 1984, 1985, 1986, 1987, 1988, 1989, 1990, 1993, 2024	2012, 2022, 2023, 2026
2	Cork	11	2	2005, 2006, 2007, 2008, 2009, 2011, 2012, 2013, 2014, 2015, 2016	2018, 2020
3	Dublin	7	7	2010, 2017, 2018, 2019, 2020, 2023, 2025	2003, 2004, 2009, 2014, 2015, 2016, 2021
4	Waterford	5	3	1991, 1992, 1994, 1995, 1998	1997, 1999, 2000
5	Mayo	4	3	1999, 2000, 2002, 2003	2001, 2007, 2017
6	Tipperary	3	2	1974, 1975, 1980	1978, 1979
7	Monaghan	2	7	1996, 1997	1994, 1995, 1998, 2002, 2008, 2011, 2013
7	Galway	2	4	2004, 2026	1975, 2005, 2019, 2024
7	Offaly	2	3	1979, 1981	1974, 1976, 1982
7	Meath	2	1	2021, 2022	2025
11	Laois	1	7	2001	1985, 1988, 1990, 1991, 1992, 1993, 1996
11	Cavan	1	2	1977	1980, 1981
11	Roscommon	1	1	1978	1977
14	Wexford	0	3		1983, 1986, 1989
14	Leitrim	0	1		1984
14	Westmeath	0	1		1987
14	Armagh	0	1		2006
14	Tyrone	0	1		2010

=== Senior Ladies' Football Provincial Championships ===
#	County	Titles	Years won
1	Dublin	10	2015, 2016, 2017, 2018, 2019, 2022, 2023, 2024, 2025, 2026
2	Galway	8	2015, 2017, 2018, 2019, 2022, 2024, 2025, 2026
3	Donegal	5	2015, 2017, 2018, 2019, 2023
3	Cork	5	2016, 2018, 2019, 2022, 2023
5	Kerry	5	2015, 2017, 2024, 2025, 2026
6	Armagh	4	2022, 2024, 2025, 2026
7	Mayo	2	2016, 2023
8	Monaghan	1	2016

== See also ==
- All-Ireland Senior Camogie Championship
- All-Ireland Intermediate Ladies' Football Championship (Tier 2)
- All-Ireland Junior Ladies' Football Championship (Tier 3)
