= 2024 All-Ireland Senior Ladies' Football Championship final =

2024 All-Ireland Senior Ladies' Football Final
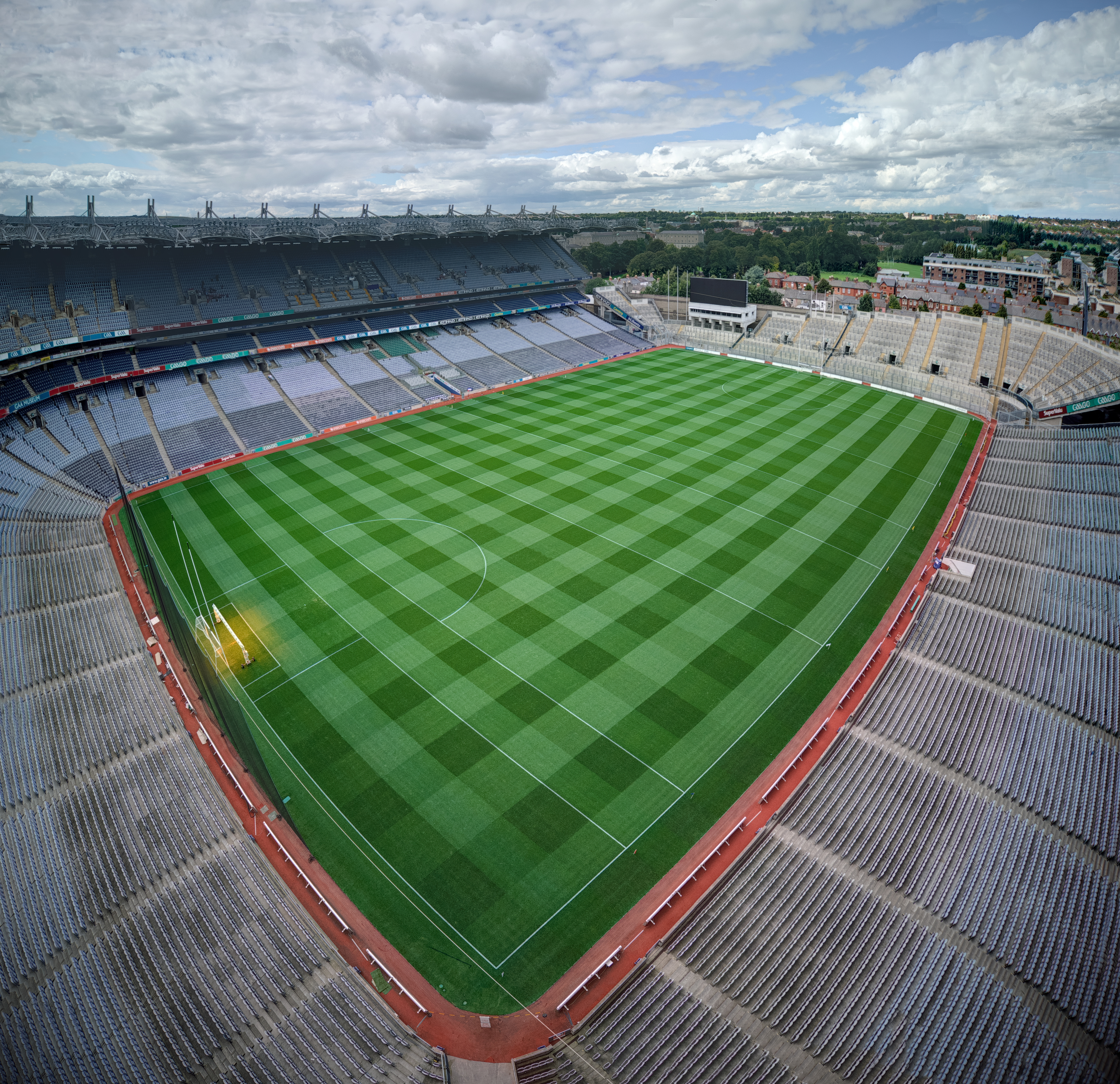
- Event: 2024 All-Ireland Senior Ladies' Football Championship
Kerry	Galway
3-14	0-11
- Date: 4 August 2024
- Venue: Croke Park, Dublin
- Player of the Match: Kayleigh Cronin (Kerry)
- Referee: Jonathan Murphy (Carlow)
- Attendance: 30,340
- Weather: 17–18 °C (63–64 °F), cloudy and windy

The 2024 All-Ireland Senior Ladies' Football Championship final was the 51st All-Ireland Final and the deciding match of the 2024 All-Ireland Senior Ladies' Football Championship, an inter-county ladies' Gaelic football tournament for the county teams of Ireland. Kerry defeated Galway to win their 12th All-Ireland ladies title.

== Background ==
- Kerry were the joint-most successful team in the history of the championship, with 11 titles, the same as Cork. However, they had not won the All-Ireland since 1993, having lost the finals of 2012, 2022 and 2023.
- Galway were playing in their fifth final; they won their only All-Ireland title in 2004, and were beaten finalists in 1975, 2005 and 2019.

== Paths to the final ==
Kerry
Round	Date	Opponent	Venue (H/A/N)	Result	Margin	Score	Ref
Munster round robin	20 April 2024	Tipperary	Fitzgerald Stadium (H)	Win	15	2-14 to 0-5	
Munster round robin	27 April 2024	Cork	Páirc Na Féile (H)	Win	4	1-14 to 1-10	
Munster round robin	5 May 2024	Waterford	Cordal (H)	Win	1	1-8 to 1-7	
Munster final	18 May 2024	Cork	Mallow GAA Complex (N)	Win	8	2-15 to 0-13	
Group game	9 June 2024	Donegal	MacCumhaill Park (A)	Draw	0	0-9 to 1-6	
Group game	15 June 2024	Waterford	Fitzgerald Stadium (H)	Win	16	4-13 to 0-9	
All-Ireland quarter-final	6 July 2024	Meath	Austin Stack Park (H)	Win	8	0-16 to 0-8	
All-Ireland semi-final	20 July 2024	Armagh	O'Connor Park (N)	Win	4	1-8 to 0-7	

Galway
Round	Date	Opponent	Venue (H/A/N)	Result	Margin	Score	Ref
Connacht final	12 May 2024	Mayo	St Brigid's (N)	Win	5	1-11 to 0-9	
Group game	15 June 2024	Cork	Munster Technological University (A)	Loss	2	1-10 to 1-12	
Group game	23 June 2024	Laois	Duggan Park (H)	Win	35	7-22 to 1-5	
All-Ireland quarter-final	6 July 2024	Dublin	Parnell Park (A)	Win	1	3-7 to 1-12 (a.e.t.)	
All-Ireland semi-final	20 July 2024	Cork	O'Connor Park (N)	Win	3	2-7 to 0-10	

== Match Info ==
4 August 2024
16:00 IST (UTC+1)
All-Ireland Final

Report

Kerry	3–14 (23) – (11) 0-11	Galway
(HT: 1-8 – 0-3)
Gls: Emma Dinneen 1, Hannah O'Donoghue 1, Aoife Dillane 1 Pts: Louise Ni Mhuircheartaigh 6 (4fs), Emma Dinneen 2, Hannah O'Donoghue 2, Lorraine Scanlon 1, Mary O'Connell 1, Anna Galvin 1, Niamh Carmody 1		Pts: Olivia Divilly 4 (2fs), Roisin Leonard 3 (2fs), Niamh Divilly 1, Andrea Trill 1, Charlotte Cooney 1, Shauna Hynes 1

Croke Park, Dublin
Referee: Jonathan Murphy (Carlow)
Attendance: 30,340

== See also ==
- List of All-Ireland Senior Ladies' Football Championship finals
