= Kayleigh Cronin =

Irish footballer (born 1996)

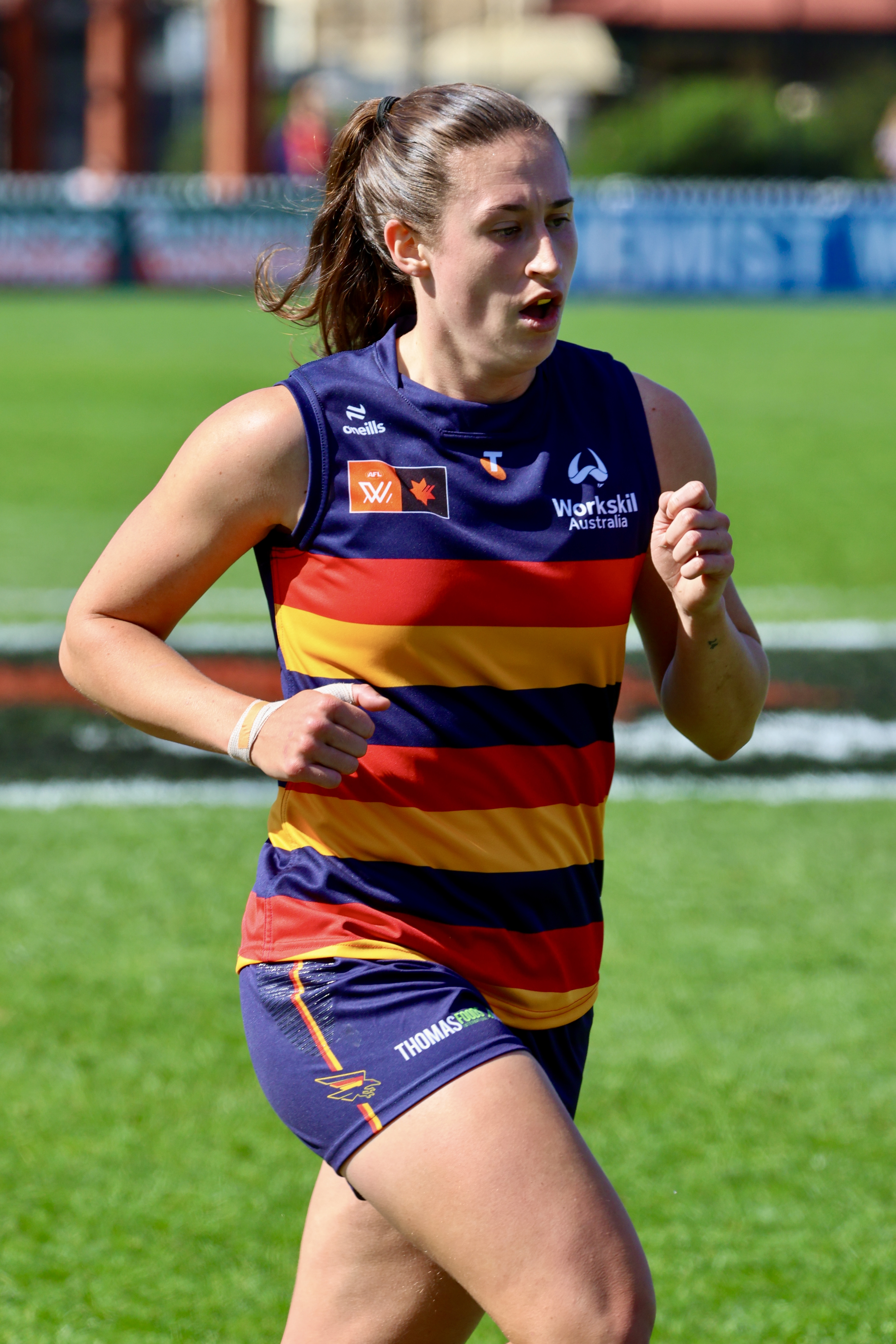
- Cronin with Adelaide in August 2026

Personal information
- Full name: Kayleigh Cronin
- Born: 10 September 1996 (age 30)
- Original teams: Dr Crokes (Kerry GAA); County Kerry (LGFA)
- Debut: Round 1, 2025, Adelaide vs. St Kilda, at Moorabbin Oval
- Height: 181 cm (5 ft 11 in)
- Position: Medium defender

Club information
- Current club: Adelaide
- Number: 22

Playing career^{1}
Years	Club	Games (Goals)
2025–	Adelaide	16 (0)

International team honours^{2}
Years	Team	Games (Goals)
2026	Ireland	1 (0)
- ^{1} Playing statistics correct to the end of 2027.^{2} Representative statistics correct as of 2026.

Kayleigh Cronin (born 10 September 1996) is an Australian rules footballer who plays for Adelaide in the AFL Women's (AFLW). She has previously played for Dr Crokes and County Kerry in the Ladies' Gaelic Football Association.

Cronin is a two-time Ladies' Gaelic Football All-Star, an All-Ireland Senior Championship player, and also has a background in discus.

== LGFA career ==
Hailing from Dr Crokes, Cronin was a member of the Kerry County team which won its first All-Ireland Senior Ladies' Football Championship in 31 years when they defeated Galway in the 2024 All-Ireland Senior Final. She also earned her second All-Star selection when she was named in the 2022 Team of the Year.

== AFL Women's career ==
Cronin was signed as a rookie by the Adelaide Crows in the AFL Women's in December 2024 following her success in Ireland. She made her debut for the club immediately in 2025, playing in the round one loss to St Kilda. She played six games during the season, including a crucial defensive role in two finals matches against St Kilda and Melbourne.

Cronin was selected on the Ireland team for the 2026 AFL Women's Australia v Ireland match. She had nine disposals in the game. At the conclusion of the 2026 AFL Women's season, during which she played ten games, Cronin resigned with the Crows until the end of 2028.
