= 2022 All-Ireland Senior Ladies' Football Championship =

All-Ireland Senior Ladies' Football Championship 2022
Championship details
- Dates: 11 June – 31 July 2022
- Teams: 13

All-Ireland champions
- Winners: Meath (2nd win)
- Manager: Eamonn Murray

All Ireland Runners-up
- Runners-up: Kerry

Provincial champions
- Connacht: Galway
- Leinster: Dublin
- Munster: Cork
- Ulster: Armagh

Championship Statistics
- Matches Played: 22

The 2022 All-Ireland Senior Ladies' Football Championship was the 49th edition of the Ladies' Gaelic Football Association's premier inter-county ladies' Gaelic Football tournament. It took place in the summer of 2022 in Ireland. Meath retained the title they won in 2021.

== Format ==
=== Provincial championships ===
The 13 teams first play in their provincial championships; Connacht (2 teams), Munster (4 teams) and Ulster (4 teams) each organise their provincial championship as a straight knockout.

In Leinster there are three teams in the provincial championship. They play each other in a round-robin phase, with two teams progressing to the final.

=== Group stage ===
The 13 teams are drawn into one group of four teams and three groups of three teams; seeding is based on performance in the provincial championships. Each team plays each other team in its group once, earning three points for a win and one for a draw.

=== Relegation ===
The last-placed teams in the groups played off to decide which two teams were relegated to the All-Ireland Intermediate Ladies' Football Championship.

=== Knockout stage ===
The top two in each group progress to the All-Ireland quarter-finals. Quarter-finals and semi-finals are "results on the day," with 20 minutes' extra time being played in the event of a draw, and a free-kick shootout being taken from a 30 m (33 yd) distance in the event of a draw after extra time. If the All-Ireland final is a draw, the game is replayed.

== Fixtures and results ==
=== Connacht Championship ===
15 May 2022
Final

Report

Galway	1-12 (15) – (11) 1-08	Mayo
(HT: 0-07 – 0-02)

Tuam Stadium, Tuam
Referee: Gus Chapman (Sligo)

=== Leinster Championship ===
==== Round robin ====
Pos	Team	Pld	W	D	L	PF	PA	PD	Pts	Qualification
1	Meath	2	2	0	0	35	19	+16	6	Advance to Leinster final
2	Dublin	2	1	0	1	51	15	+36	3	Advance to Leinster final
3	Westmeath	2	0	0	2	13	65	−52	0	

Updated to match(es) played on 14 May 2022. Source: ladiesgaelic.ie
Rules for classification: Tiebreakers

==== Final ====
28 May 2022
Final

Report

Meath	1-05 (8) – (10) 1-07	Dublin
(HT: 0-01 – 0-05)

Croke Park, Dublin

=== Munster Championship ===
7 May 2022
Semi-Final

Report

Kerry	2-12 (18) – (8) 0-08	Tipperary
(HT: 2-07 – 0-04)

Páirc Uí Rinn, Cork
Referee: Patrick Smith (Waterford)

15 May 2022
Semi-Final

Report

Waterford	1-12 (15) – (22) 4-10	Cork
(HT: 0-04 – 2-07)

Fraher Field, Dungarvan
Referee: S Mulvihill (Kerry)

28 May 2022
Final

Report

Kerry	1-09 (12) – (17) 2-11	Cork
(HT: 1-04 – 2-06)

Fitzgerald Stadium, Killarney
Referee: P Smith (Waterford)

=== Ulster Championship ===
30 April 2022
14:15 IST (UTC+1)
Semi-Final

Report

Monaghan	0-05 (5) – (36) 5-21	Armagh
(HT: 0-3 – 1-10)

St Tiernach’s Park, Clones

8 May 2022
Semi-Final

Report

Cavan	1-11 (14) – (28) 3-19	Donegal
(HT: 0-06 – 2-10)

St Tiernach’s Park, Clones

22 May 2022
Final

Report

Armagh	3-17 (26) – (25) 2-19 (a.e.t.)	Donegal
(HT: 1-08 – 2-05)

St Tiernach’s Park, Clones
Referee: Gavin Finnegan (Down)

=== Group stage ===
Group games take place 11–25 June 2022.

==== Group 1 ====
Pos	Team	Pld	W	D	L	PF	PA	PD	Pts	Qualification
1	Dublin	3	3	0	0	63	26	+37	9	Advance to quarter-finals
2	Mayo	3	2	0	1	45	44	+1	6	Advance to quarter-finals
3	Tipperary	3	1	0	2	27	44	−17	3	
4	Cavan	3	0	0	3	36	57	−21	0	Advance to relegation playoffs

Updated to match(es) played on 25 June 2022. Source: ladiesgaelic.ie
Rules for classification: Tiebreakers

==== Group 2 ====
Pos	Team	Pld	W	D	L	PF	PA	PD	Pts	Qualification
1	Meath	2	1	1	0	25	10	+15	4	Advance to quarter-finals
2	Armagh	2	1	1	0	27	13	+14	4	Advance to quarter-finals
3	Monaghan	2	0	0	2	5	34	−29	0	Advance to relegation playoffs

Updated to match(es) played on 25 June 2022. Source: ladiesgaelic.ie
Rules for classification: Tiebreakers

==== Group 3 ====
Pos	Team	Pld	W	D	L	PF	PA	PD	Pts	Qualification
1	Kerry	2	2	0	0	42	26	+16	6	Advance to quarter-finals
2	Galway	2	1	0	1	38	23	+15	3	Advance to quarter-finals
3	Westmeath	2	0	0	2	13	44	−31	0	Advance to relegation playoffs

Updated to match(es) played on 25 June 2022. Source: ladiesgaelic.ie
Rules for classification: Tiebreakers

==== Group 4 ====
Pos	Team	Pld	W	D	L	PF	PA	PD	Pts	Qualification
1	Cork	2	2	0	0	34	21	+13	6	Advance to quarter-finals
2	Donegal	2	1	0	1	23	26	−3	3	Advance to quarter-finals
3	Waterford	2	0	0	2	16	26	−10	0	Advance to relegation playoffs

Updated to match(es) played on 25 June 2022. Source: ladiesgaelic.ie
Rules for classification: Tiebreakers

Results

=== Relegation Playoffs ===
3 July 2022
13:00 IST (UTC+1)
Relegation Playoff

Report

Cavan	1-13 (16) – (12) 1-09	Westmeath

Pearse Park (Longford)
Referee: Gus Chapman

9 July 2022
14:00 IST (UTC+1)
Relegation Playoff

Report

Monaghan	0-06 (6) – (23) 3-12	Waterford

Bray Emmets GAA
Referee: Jonathan Murphy

Monaghan and Westmeath are relegated to the All-Ireland Intermediate Ladies' Football Championship for 2023.

=== Finals ===
TG4

9 July 2022
14:00 IST (UTC+1)
Quarter-Final 1

Report

Dublin	1-07 (10) – (16) 3-07	Donegal

Páirc Seán Mac Diarmada
Referee: Kevin Phelan

TG4

9 July 2022
19:15 IST (UTC+1)
Quarter-Final 2

Report

Meath	1-12 (15) – (14) 1-11	Galway

O'Connor Park
Referee: Barry Redmond

TG4

9 July 2022
17:00 IST (UTC+1)
Quarter-Final 3

Report

Armagh	2-14 (20) – (24) 4-12	Kerry

O'Connor Park
Referee: Shane Curley

TG4

9 July 2022
15:00 IST (UTC+1)
Quarter-Final 4

Report

Cork	0-17 (17) – (19) 2-13	Mayo

Cusack Park (Ennis)
Referee: Seamus Mulvihill

TG4

16 July 2022
14:00 IST (UTC+1)
Semi-Final

Report

Kerry	4-10 (22) – (13) 0-13	Mayo

Croke Park, Dublin
Referee: Jonathan Murphy

TG4

16 July 2022
16:00 IST (UTC+1)
Semi-Final

Report

Donegal	1-07 (10) – (12) 0-12	Meath

Croke Park, Dublin
Referee: Shane Curley

TG4

31 July 2022
16:00 IST (UTC+1)
All-Ireland Final

Report

Kerry	1-07 (10) – (19) 3-10	Meath
(HT: 1-05 - 1-08)
Gls: N O'Sullivan, E Troy, B Lynch; Pts: S Grimes 3 (2fs), V Wall 3 (2fs), N O'Sullivan 2, E Troy 1, E Duggan 1 (1f)		Gls: L Ní Mhuircheartaigh; Pts: L Ní Mhuircheartaigh 2 (2fs), S O'Shea 2, L Scanlon 1, C Murphy 1, P McCarthy 1

Croke Park, Dublin
Referee: Maggie Farrelly (Cavan)
Attendance: 46,440

== See also ==
- 2022 All-Ireland Intermediate Ladies' Football Championship
- 2022 All-Ireland Junior Ladies' Football Championship
- 2022 Ladies' National Football League
