= Ladies' Gaelic football in County Kildare =

Ladies' Gaelic football in County Kildare is administered by the Kildare County Board of the Ladies' Gaelic Football Association.

== History ==
The Kildare County Board was set up in March 1992 under the chairmanship of Catherine Donohoe. At that time there were two clubs playing in the County, Kilcock and Leixlip, and these were joined by the newly formed Eadestown club. Michael Delaney of Leixlip was elected chairman on 10 February 1993.

== Clubs ==
Grangenolvan dominated club competition in the sport, in which they won five in a row at the time the championship was elevated to senior status.

== County teams ==
The Kildare senior ladies' football team represents Kildare in the Ladies' National Football League and the All-Ireland Senior Ladies' Football Championship. There are also intermediate, junior, under-21 and minor teams.
