= 2026 All-Ireland Senior Ladies' Football Championship =

Ladies Gaelic football tournament

All-Ireland Senior Ladies' Football Championship 2026
Championship details
- Dates: 25 April – 2 August, 2026
- Teams: 12

All-Ireland champions
- Winners: Galway (2nd win)
- Captain: Kate Geraghty
- Manager: Mark Bourke

All Ireland Runners-up
- Runners-up: Kerry
- Captain: Siofra O'Shea
- Manager: Daniel Moynihan

Provincial champions
- Connacht: Galway
- Leinster: Dublin
- Munster: Kerry
- Ulster: Armagh

Championship Statistics
- Matches Played: 35

The 2026 All-Ireland Senior Ladies' Football Championship, known for sponsorship reasons as the TG4 All-Ireland Senior Ladies' Football Championship, was the 53rd edition of the Ladies' Gaelic Football Association's premier inter-county ladies' Gaelic football tournament, taking place in spring-summer 2026 in Ireland.

Galway were the winners, defeating Kerry by a point in the final, Leanne Coen scoring two goals for them. This was only their second Brendan Martin Cup, the first coming in 2004.

== Format ==
=== Provincial championships ===
The 12 teams first played in their provincial championships.

There were only two teams in Connacht, so their championship is a single match.

In Leinster and Ulster there were three teams, and there were four in Munster. In each of these provinces the teams play each other in a round-robin phase, with two teams progressing to the final.

=== Group stage ===
The 12 teams were drawn into four groups of three teams; seeding is based on performance in the provincial championships. Each team plays each other team in its group once, earning three points for a win and one for a draw.

=== Tiebreakers for group ranking ===
If two teams were level on points, the tie-break was:

- winners of the head-to-head game are ranked ahead
- if the head-to-head match was a draw, then whichever team scored more points in the game is ranked ahead (e.g. 0-18 beats 2-12)
- if the head-to-head match was an exact draw, ranking is determined by the points difference (i.e. total scored minus total conceded in all games)
- if the points difference is equal, ranking is determined by the total scored

If three teams were level on league points, rankings are determined solely by points difference.

=== Relegation ===
The last-placed teams in the groups play off to decide which team was relegated to the All-Ireland Intermediate Ladies' Football Championship.

=== Knockout stage ===
The top two in each group progressed to the All-Ireland quarter-finals. Quarter-finals and semi-finals are "results on the day," with 20 minutes' extra time being played in the event of a draw, and a free-kick shootout being taken from a 30 m (33 yd) distance in the event of a draw after extra time. If the All-Ireland final is a draw, the game is replayed.

== Provincial championships ==
=== Connacht Championship ===
3 May 2026
Final

Galway	1-11 - 0-11	Mayo
	report

=== Leinster Championship ===
Pos	Team	Pld	W	D	L	PF	PA	PD	Pts	Qualification
1	Dublin	2	2	0	0	34	19	+15	6	Advance to final
2	Kildare	2	1	0	1	26	28	−2	3	Advance to final
3	Meath	2	0	0	2	13	26	−13	0	

Source: ladiesgaelic.ie

==== Final ====
17 May 2026
Final

Dublin	2-12 - 2-6	Kildare
	report

=== Munster Championship ===
Pos	Team	Pld	W	D	L	PF	PA	PD	Pts	Qualification
1	Waterford	3	3	0	0	56	39	+17	9	Advance to final
2	Kerry	3	2	0	1	43	32	+11	6	Advance to final
3	Tipperary	3	1	0	2	26	30	−4	3	
4	Cork	3	0	0	3	33	57	−24	0	

Source: ladiesgaelic.ie

==== Final ====
24 May 2026
Final

Kerry	2-9 - 1-11	Waterford
	report

=== Ulster Championship ===
Pos	Team	Pld	W	D	L	PF	PA	PD	Pts	Qualification
1	Tyrone	2	2	0	0	35	21	+14	6	Advance to final
2	Armagh	2	1	0	1	18	20	−2	3	Advance to final
3	Donegal	2	0	0	2	20	32	−12	0	

Source: ladiesgaelic.ie

==== Final ====
24 May 2026
Final

Armagh	2-13 - 1-15	Tyrone
	report

== All-Ireland championship ==
=== Group 1 ===
Pos	Team	Pld	W	D	L	PF	PA	PD	Pts	Qualification
1	Armagh	2	2	0	0	43	30	+13	6	Advance to quarter-finals
2	Cork	2	1	0	1	30	39	–9	3	Advance to quarter-finals
3	Waterford	2	0	0	2	35	39	–4	0	Relegation playoffs

Source: ladiesgaelic.ie

Rules for classification: Tiebreakers

=== Group 2 ===
Pos	Team	Pld	W	D	L	PF	PA	PD	Pts	Qualification
1	Kerry	2	2	0	0	44	12	+32	6	Advance to quarter-finals
2	Kildare	2	1	0	1	24	31	–7	3	Advance to quarter-finals
3	Tipperary (R)	2	0	0	2	13	38	–25	0	Relegation playoffs

Source: ladiesgaelic.ie

Rules for classification: Tiebreakers

=== Group 3 ===
Pos	Team	Pld	W	D	L	PF	PA	PD	Pts	Qualification
1	Dublin	2	2	0	0	40	17	+23	6	Advance to quarter-finals
2	Mayo	2	1	0	1	30	33	–3	3	Advance to quarter-finals
3	Donegal	2	0	0	2	17	37	–20	0	Relegation playoffs

Source: ladiesgaelic.ie

Rules for classification: Tiebreakers

=== Group 4 ===
Pos	Team	Pld	W	D	L	PF	PA	PD	Pts	Qualification
1	Galway	2	2	0	0	59	25	+34	6	Advance to quarter-finals
2	Meath	2	1	0	1	27	40	–13	3	Advance to quarter-finals
3	Tyrone	2	0	0	2	26	47	–21	0	Relegation playoffs

Source: ladiesgaelic.ie

Rules for classification: Tiebreakers

=== Relegation playoffs ===
4 July 2026
14:00
Relegation Qualifier

Report

Waterford	1-12 (15) – (17) 2-11 (a.e.t.)	Donegal
(HT: 1-6 – 0-2) (FT: 1-8 – 1-8)

Padraig Pearses GAA Roscommon, Ballinasloe

4 July 2026
15:30
Relegation Qualifier

Report

Tipperary	1-09 (12) – (16) 0-16	Tyrone
(HT: 1-5 – 0-10)

Dovida Lakepoint Park, Mullingar

11 July 2026
17:00
Relegation Play-off

Report

Waterford	0-15 (15) – (11) 1-08	Tipperary
(HT: 0-8 – 1-2)

Mallow GAA, Mallow
Referee: Shane Curley (Galway)

Tipperary are relegated to the All-Ireland Intermediate Ladies' Football Championship for 2027.

=== Finals ===
Quarter-finals
Dublin	3-11
Cork	2-13
Meath	0-8
Kerry	2-14
Armagh	3-9
Kildare	1-12
Galway	2-20
Mayo	1-6

Semi-finals
Dublin	1-9
Kerry	2-16
Armagh	0-8
Galway	0-21

Final
Kerry	0-12
Galway	2-7

TG4

4 July 2026
13:45
Quarter-final 4

Report

Armagh	3-09 (18) – (15) 1-12	Kildare
(HT: 2-5 – 0-6)

BOX-IT Athletic Grounds, Armagh
Referee: Anthony Marron (Monaghan)

TG4

4 July 2026
17:15
Quarter-final 3

Report

Kerry	2-14 (20) – (8) 0-08	Meath
(HT: 2-6 – 0-6)

Austin Stack Park, Tralee
Referee: Barry Redmond (Wexford)

TG4

4 July 2026
19:30
Quarter-final 1

Report

Dublin	3-11 (20) – (19) 2-13	Cork
(HT: 1-6 – 1-7)

Parnell Park, Donnycarney
Referee: Eoghan O’Neill (Kildare)

TG4

5 July 2026
17:45
Quarter-final 2

Report

Galway	2-20 (26) – (9) 1-06	Mayo
(HT: 0-6 – 1-3)

Tuam Stadium, Tuam

TG4

18 July 2026
15:15
Semi-final

Report

Galway	0-21 (21) – (8) 0-08	Armagh
(HT: 0-10 – 0-3)

Pearse Park, Longford
Referee: Angela Gallagher

TG4

18 July 2026
17:15
Semi-final

Report

Dublin	1-09 (12) – (22) 2-16	Kerry
(HT: 1-5 – 2-8)

Semple Stadium, Thurles
Referee: Gus Chapman

TG4

2 August 2026
16:15
Final

Report

Kerry	0-12 (12) – (13) 2-07	Galway
(HT: 0-7 – 1-4)
Pts: S O’Shea 5 (3fs), N Ní Chonchúir 3, E Costello 1, N Carmody 1, C Evans 1, J Lucey 1		Gls: L Coen 2 Pts: O Divilly 3 (1f), K Slevin 1, K Thompson 1, E Noone 1, R Leonard 1

Croke Park, Dublin
Referee: Margaret Farrelly
Attendance: 26,471

== See also ==
- All-Ireland Intermediate Ladies' Football Championship
- All-Ireland Junior Ladies' Football Championship
- 2026 Ladies' National Football League
