= Eamonn Murray =

Led Meath to the Promised Land

Sport
Inter-county titles as manager
County	League	Province	All-Ireland
Meath	2		

Eamonn Murray is a Gaelic footballer who is assistant manager of the Cavan county team.

== Manager ==
Originally from Cavan GAA club Gowna, Murray spent several decades living in County Meath, and thought of Seán Boylan as someone he would "try to learn" from during this time. 1987 and 1988 All-Ireland SFC winner Liam Harnan is a brother-in-law. Murray is married to Harnan's sister. Harnan's nephew, the 2023 Tailteann Cup winner Padraic, is another relative.

Murray won the 2009 All-Ireland U16FC and 2016 All-Ireland MFC B titles, sides that featured many of the players from his future successes, before being appointed as manager of the senior team in 2017. He then brought the team as far as the 2018 and 2019 All-Ireland Intermediate Ladies' Football finals, before winning the 2020 edition.

He won the 2021 All-Ireland Senior Ladies' Football Championship, defeating a Dublin team seeking a fifth consecutive title in the final.

He then won the 2022 All Ireland Senior Ladies' Football title.

He resigned as Meath manager at the end of August 2022. Murray said he had been thinking about doing so since that year's All-Ireland final had ended. He previously stated his hopes that his work with Meath would help other teams, such as Kerry, to make a breakthrough in the sport. He had led Meath to the top from the Intermediate class. He was also in charge of the team when they won Division 2 and Division 1 league titles.

Murray described the AFLW, the semi-professional Australian rules football league, as "dreadful stuff" with "no skill at all". He said that the loss of his players to the AFLW was why he cried after the 2022 final.

From August 2023, he began working as assistant manager of Cavan and mentor to newly appointed manager Raymond Galligan. Galligan was the second-youngest inter-county manager at the time, and had just retired from playing inter-county football.
