= 2021 All-Ireland Senior Ladies' Football Championship final =

2021 All-Ireland Senior Ladies' Football Final
- Event: 2021 All-Ireland Senior Ladies' Football Championship
| Meath | Dublin |
| 1-11 | 0-12 |
- Meath, 2020 All-Ireland Intermediate champions win their first Senior title in their debut final by also ending Dublin's drive for five attempt.
- Date: 5 September 2021
- Venue: Croke Park, Dublin
- Referee: Brendan Rice (Down)

The 2021 All-Ireland Senior Ladies' Football Championship final was the 48th All-Ireland Final and the deciding match of the 2021 All-Ireland Senior Ladies' Football Championship, an inter-county ladies' Gaelic football tournament for the county teams of Ireland. Dublin contested their 12th final, and were chasing 5 All-Ireland victories in a row after defeating Mayo in the 2021 semi-final.

Meath were playing in their first All-Ireland Senior final, having won the 2020 All-Ireland Intermediate Ladies' Football Championship, and defeated Cork in the semi-final. Meath won their first Senior All Ireland and ended Dublin's drive for five consecutive titles.

== Match info ==
TG4

5 September 2021
16:15 IST (UTC+1)
Final

Report

| Meath | 1-11 (14) – (12) 0-12 | Dublin |
|---|---|---|
(HT: 1-8 - 0-6)
| Gls: Emma Duggan 1 Pts: Stacey Grimes 3 (2fs), Niamh O’Sullivan 3, Emma Troy 2, Emma Duggan 2, Bridgetta Lynch 1 | | Pts: Hannah Tyrrell 7 (3fs), Sinéad Aherne 1f, Martha Byrne 1, Kate Sullivan 1, Carla Rowe 1, Lyndsey Davey 1 |

Croke Park, Dublin
Referee: Brendan Rice (Down)

== See also ==
- List of All-Ireland Senior Ladies' Football Championship finals
