= 2024 All-Ireland Senior Ladies' Football Championship =

Ladies Gaelic football tournament

All-Ireland Senior Ladies' Football Championship 2024
Championship details
- Dates: 20 April – 4 August, 2024
- Teams: 12

All-Ireland champions
- Winners: Kerry (12th win)
- Captain: Niamh Carmody

All Ireland Runners-up
- Runners-up: Galway
- Captain: Ailbhe Davoren

Provincial champions
- Connacht: Galway
- Leinster: Dublin
- Munster: Kerry
- Ulster: Armagh

Championship Statistics
- Matches Played: 38

The 2024 All-Ireland Senior Ladies' Football Championship was the 51st edition of the Ladies' Gaelic Football Association's premier inter-county ladies' Gaelic football tournament, that took place in spring-summer 2024 in Ireland.

== Format ==
=== Provincial championships ===
The 12 teams first play in their provincial championships. Connacht and Ulster each contain two teams, so their championships are played as a single match.

In Leinster and Munster, there are four teams in the provincial championships. They play each other in a round-robin phase, with two teams progressing to the final.

=== Group stage ===
The 12 teams are drawn into four groups of three teams; seeding is based on performance in the provincial championships. Each team plays each other team in its group once, earning three points for a win and one for a draw.

=== Tiebreakers for group ranking ===
If two teams are level on points, the tie-break is:

- winners of the head-to-head game are ranked ahead
- if the head-to-head match was a draw, then whichever team scored more points in the game is ranked ahead (e.g. 1-15 beats 2–12)
- if the head-to-head match was an exact draw, ranking is determined by the points difference (i.e. total scored minus total conceded in all games)
- if the points difference is equal, ranking is determined by the total scored

If three teams are level on league points, rankings are determined solely by points difference.

=== Relegation ===
The last-placed teams in the groups play off to decide which team is relegated to the All-Ireland Intermediate Ladies' Football Championship. Provincial champions are exempt from relegation.

=== Knockout stage ===
The top two in each group progress to the All-Ireland quarter-finals. Quarter-finals and semi-finals are "results on the day," with 20 minutes' extra time being played in the event of a draw, and a free-kick shootout being taken from a 30 m (33 yd) distance in the event of a draw after extra time. If the All-Ireland final is a draw, the game is replayed.

== Provincial Championships ==
=== Connacht Championship ===
TG4 YouTube

12 May 2024
14:00 IST (UTC+1)
Final

Report

Galway	1-11 (14) – (9) 0-09	Mayo

St Brigid's, Kiltoom

=== Leinster Championship ===
==== Group stage ====
Pos	Team	Pld	W	D	L	PF	PA	PD	Pts	Qualification
1	Dublin	3	3	0	0	89	19	+70	9	Advance to Leinster final
2	Meath	3	2	0	1	45	50	−5	6	Advance to Leinster final
3	Kildare	3	1	0	2	34	54	−20	3	
4	Laois	3	0	0	3	21	66	−45	0	

Source: leinsterladiesgaelic.ie
Rules for classification: Tiebreakers

==== Final ====
12 May 2024
11:45 IST (UTC+1)
Final

Report

Dublin	3-17 (26) – (8) 0-08	Meath
(HT: 2-8 – 0-2)
Gls: C Rowe 1, J Dunne 1, C O’Connor 1 Pts: H Tyrrell 5 (1f), N Hetherton 4, C Rowe 3fs, O Carey 1, J Magee 1, O Nolan 1, N Owens 1, C Darby 1		Pts: E Duggan 6 (4f), A Cleary 1, C Smyth 1

Croke Park, Dublin
Referee: Marion Hayden (Carlow)

=== Munster Championship ===
==== Group stage ====
Pos	Team	Pld	W	D	L	PF	PA	PD	Pts	Qualification
1	Kerry	3	3	0	0	48	28	+20	9	Advance to Munster final
2	Cork	3	2	0	1	37	38	−1	6	Advance to Munster final
3	Tipperary	3	1	0	2	32	42	−10	3	
4	Waterford	3	0	0	3	32	41	−9	0	

Source: munsterlgfa.com
Rules for classification: Tiebreakers

==== Final ====
18 May 2024
Final

Report

Kerry	2-15 (21) – (13) 0-13	Cork
(HT: 1-04 – 0-10)

Mallow GAA Complex, Mallow
Referee: Patrick Smith (Waterford)

=== Ulster Championship ===
19 May 2024
15:30 IST (UTC+1)
Final

Report

Donegal	1-13 (16) – (17) 0-17 (a.e.t.)	Armagh
(HT: 0-05 – 0-06) (FT: 1-11 – 0-14)

St Tiernach's Park, Clones

== Group stage ==
Group games took place 8–23 June 2024.

=== Group 1 ===
Pos	Team	Pld	W	D	L	PF	PA	PD	Pts	Qualification
1	Armagh	2	1	1	0	28	27	+1	4	Advance to quarter-finals
2	Meath	2	1	0	1	38	36	+2	3	Advance to quarter-finals
3	Tipperary	2	0	1	1	28	31	−3	1	Advance to relegation playoffs

Source: ladiesgaelic.ie
Rules for classification: Tiebreakers

=== Group 2 ===
Pos	Team	Pld	W	D	L	PF	PA	PD	Pts	Qualification
1	Kerry	2	1	1	0	34	18	+16	4	Advance to quarter-finals
2	Waterford	2	1	0	1	22	32	−10	3	Advance to quarter-finals
3	Donegal	2	0	1	1	16	22	−6	1	Advance to relegation playoffs

Source: ladiesgaelic.ie
Rules for classification: Tiebreakers

=== Group 3 ===
Pos	Team	Pld	W	D	L	PF	PA	PD	Pts	Qualification
1	Cork	2	2	0	0	46	21	+25	6	Advance to quarter-finals
2	Galway	2	1	0	1	56	23	+33	3	Advance to quarter-finals
3	Laois (R)	2	0	0	2	16	74	−58	0	Advance to relegation playoffs

Source: ladiesgaelic.ie
Rules for classification: Tiebreakers
(R) Relegated to Intermediate championship

=== Group 4 ===
Pos	Team	Pld	W	D	L	PF	PA	PD	Pts	Qualification
1	Dublin	2	2	0	0	44	14	+30	6	Advance to quarter-finals
2	Mayo	2	1	0	1	26	18	+8	3	Advance to quarter-finals
3	Kildare	2	0	0	2	14	52	−38	0	Advance to relegation playoffs

Source: ladiesgaelic.ie
Rules for classification: Tiebreakers

=== Relegation playoffs ===
6 July 2024
14:00 IST (UTC+1)
Relegation Qualifier

Report

Tipperary	1-15 (18) – (7) 1-04	Laois
(HT: 1-11 – 0-0)

John Locke Park, Callan
Referee: Sinead McHugh

6 July 2024
14:00 IST (UTC+1)
Relegation Qualifier

Report

Donegal	0-09 (9) – (8) 0-08	Kildare
(HT: 0-5 – 0-6)

Breffni Park, Cavan
Referee: Eddie Cuthbert

13 July 2024
13:30 IST (UTC+1)
Relegation Play-off

Report

Laois	1-08 (11) – (13) 1-10	Kildare
(HT: 0-3 – 0-9)

Netwatch Cullen Park, Carlow
Referee: Philip Conway (Armagh)

Laois are relegated to the All-Ireland Intermediate Ladies' Football Championship for 2025.

== All-Ireland knockout stage ==
=== Bracket ===
Quarter-finals
Kerry	0-16
Meath	0-8
Armagh	2-11
Mayo	0-11
Dublin	1-12
Galway (a.e.t.)	3-7
Cork	1-17
Waterford	2-4

Semi-finals
Kerry	1-8
Armagh	0-7
Galway	2-7
Cork	0-10

Final
Kerry	3-14
Galway	0-11

=== Fixtures and results ===
TG4

6 July 2024
13:15 IST (UTC+1)
Quarter-Final

Report

Cork	1-17 (20) – (10) 2-04	Waterford
(HT: 0-6 – 1-2)

Páirc Uí Chaoimh, Cork
Referee: Jonathan Murphy (Carlow)

TG4

6 July 2024
17:15 IST (UTC+1)
Quarter-Final

Report

Kerry	0-16 (16) – (8) 0-08	Meath
(HT: 0-4 – 0-5)

Austin Stack Park, Tralee
Referee: Barry Redmond (Wexford)

TG4

6 July 2024
19:30 IST (UTC+1)
Quarter-Final

Report

Dublin	1-12 (15) – (16) 3-07 (a.e.t.)	Galway
(HT: 1-4 – 2-2) (FT: 1-8 – 2-5)

Parnell Park, Donnycarney
Referee: Seamus Mulvihill

TG4

7 July 2024
17:45 BST (UTC+1)
Quarter-Final

Report

Armagh	2-11 (17) – (11) 0-11	Mayo
(HT: 1-6 – 0-3)

Athletic Grounds, Armagh
Referee: Brendan Rice (Down)

TG4

20 July 2024
17:15 IST (UTC+1)
Semi-Final

Report

Cork	0-10 (10) – (13) 2-07	Galway
(HT: 0-5 – 2-4)
Pts: K Quirke 7 (4fs), A McAuliffe 1, E Cleary 1, L O’Mahony 1		Gls: R Leonard 1pen, A Davoren 1 Pts: R Leonard 5 (4fs), O Divilly 2fs

O'Connor Park, Tullamore
Referee: Kevin Phelan (Laois)

TG4

20 July 2024
19:30 IST (UTC+1)
Semi-Final

Report

Armagh	0-07 (7) – (11) 1-08	Kerry
(HT: 0-5 – 1-7)
Pts: E Lavery 2, B Mackin 2 (1f), D Coleman 1, N Henderson 1, N Coleman 1		Gls: N Ni Chonchuir 1 Pts: L Ni Mhuircheartaigh 2fs, N Carmody 2, D O'Leary 2 (1f), S O'Shea 1, A O'Connell 1

O'Connor Park, Tullamore
Referee: S Curley (Galway)

=== All-Ireland final ===
4 August, 2024
16:00 IST (UTC+1)
All-Ireland Final

Report

Kerry	3–14 (23) – (11) 0-11	Galway
(HT: 1-8 – 0-3)
Gls: Emma Dinneen 1, Hannah O'Donoghue 1, Aoife Dillane 1 Pts: Louise Ni Mhuircheartaigh 6 (4fs), Emma Dinneen 2, Hannah O'Donoghue 2, Lorraine Scanlon 1, Mary O'Connell 1, Anna Galvin 1, Niamh Carmody 1		Pts: Olivia Divilly 4 (2fs), Roisin Leonard 3 (2fs), Niamh Divilly 1, Andrea Trill 1, Charlotte Cooney 1, Shauna Hynes 1

Croke Park, Dublin
Referee: Jonathan Murphy (Carlow)
Attendance: 30,340

== See also ==
- 2024 All-Ireland Intermediate Ladies' Football Championship
- 2024 All-Ireland Junior Ladies' Football Championship
- 2024 Ladies' National Football League
