= 2023 All-Ireland Senior Ladies' Football Championship final =

2023 All-Ireland Senior Ladies' Football Final
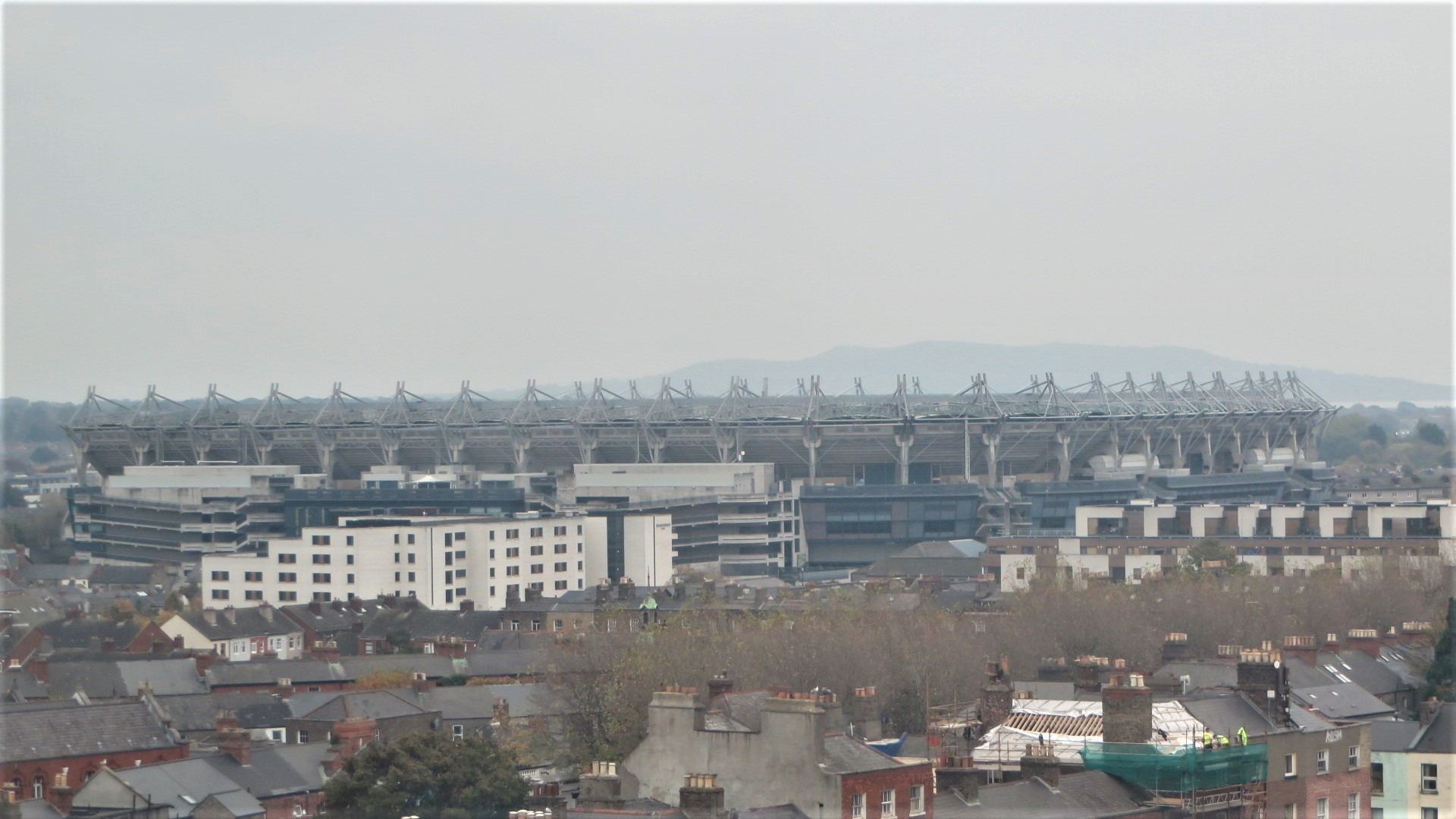
- Event: 2023 All-Ireland Senior Ladies' Football Championship
Kerry	Dublin
1-10	0-18
- Date: 13 August 2023
- Venue: Croke Park, Dublin
- Player of the Match: Hannah Tyrrell (Dublin)
- Referee: Shane Curley (Galway)
- Attendance: 45,326
- Weather: 16–18 °C (61–64 °F), mild

The 2023 All-Ireland Senior Ladies' Football Championship final was the 50th All-Ireland Final and the deciding match of the 2023 All-Ireland Senior Ladies' Football Championship, an inter-county ladies' Gaelic football tournament for the county teams of Ireland. Dublin defeated Kerry to win a sixth title.

== Background ==
- Kerry are one of the most successful teams in the championship's history, being tied for most titles with Cork with 11. However, Kerry have not won the All-Ireland Ladies' SFC since 1993. They reached two finals since then, losing to Cork in 2012 and Meath in 2022.
- Dublin were aiming for a sixth title; they won in 2010 and had a four-in-a-row in 2017–20.
- This was only the third time that the same two counties met in the men's and women's final; in 1982 both games were Kerry–Offaly and in 2017 both were Dublin–Mayo.

== Paths to the final ==
=== Dublin ===
30 April 2023 Leinster round-robin	Meath	0-07 – 1-06	Dublin	Navan
				Stadium: Páirc Tailteann

7 May 2023 Leinster round-robin	Dublin	3-14 – 0-03	Laois	Whitehall
				Stadium: DCU St Clare's

28 May 2023 Leinster final	Dublin	2-09 – 0-09	Meath	Portlaoise
				Stadium: O'Moore Park

18 June 2023 Group C	Dublin	1-09 – 2-08	Kerry	Donnycarney
				Stadium: Parnell Park

25 June 2023 Group C	Cavan	1-08 – 5-15	Dublin	Cavan
				Stadium: Breffni Park

16 July 2023 All-Ireland quarter-final	Dublin	3-12 – 0-06	Donegal	Donnycarney
				Stadium: Parnell Park

29 July 2023 All-Ireland semi-final	Dublin	2-19 – 0-13	Cork	Thurles
				Stadium: Semple Stadium

=== Kerry ===
30 April 2023 Munster round-robin	Waterford	0-08 – 2-08	Kerry	Dungarvan
				Stadium: Fraher Field

7 May 2023 Munster round-robin	Cork	2-14 – 2-14	Kerry	Cork
				Stadium: Páirc Uí Chaoimh

14 May 2023 Munster round-robin	Tipperary	1-05 – 2-08	Kerry	Bansha
				Stadium: Canon Hayes Park

28 May 2023 Munster final	Cork	5-14 – 2-17	Kerry	Mallow
				Stadium: Mallow GAA

18 June 2023 Group C	Dublin	1-09 – 2-08	Kerry	Donnycarney
				Stadium: Parnell Park

1 July 2023 Group C	Kerry	2-21 – 2-05	Cavan	Tralee
				Stadium: Austin Stack Park

15 July 2023 All-Ireland quarter-final	Kerry	2-08 – 0-10	Meath	Tralee
				Stadium: Austin Stack Park

29 July 2023 All-Ireland semi-final	Kerry	1-16 – 1-11	Mayo	Thurles
				Stadium: Semple Stadium

== Match info ==
TG4

13 August 2023
16:00 IST (UTC+1)
All-Ireland Final

Report

Kerry	1-10 (13) – (18) 0-18	Dublin
(HT: 0-04 – 0-11)
Gls: Louise Ni Mhuircheartaigh 1 Pts: Louise Ni Mhuircheartaigh 7 (6f), Niamh Carmody 2, Aishling O'Connell 1		Pts: Hannah Tyrrell 8 (4f), Carla Rowe 4 (1f), Jennifer Dunne 2, Orlagh Nolan 1, Caoimhe O'Connor 1, Kate Sullivan 1, Niamh Hetherton 1

Croke Park, Dublin
Referee: Shane Curley (Galway)
Attendance: 45,326

== See also ==
- List of All-Ireland Senior Ladies' Football Championship finals
