= 2025 All-Ireland Senior Ladies' Football Championship =

Ladies Gaelic football tournament

All-Ireland Senior Ladies' Football Championship 2025
Championship details
- Dates: April – 3 August, 2025
- Teams: 12

All-Ireland champions
- Winners: Dublin (7th win)
- Captain: Carla Rowe
- Manager: Paul Casey & Derek Murray

All Ireland Runners-up
- Runners-up: Meath
- Captain: Aoibhín Cleary
- Manager: Shane McCormack

Provincial champions
- Connacht: Galway
- Leinster: Dublin
- Munster: Kerry
- Ulster: Armagh

Championship Statistics
- Matches Played: 35

The 2025 All-Ireland Senior Ladies' Football Championship, known for sponsorship reasons as the TG4 All-Ireland Senior Ladies' Football Championship, was the 52nd edition of the Ladies' Gaelic Football Association's premier inter-county ladies' Gaelic football tournament, taking place in spring-summer 2025 in Ireland.

Dublin were the winners, defeating Meath in the final.

== Format ==
=== Provincial championships ===
The 12 teams first play in their provincial championships.

There are only two teams in Ulster, so their championship is a single match.

In Leinster and Connacht there are three teams, and there are four in Munster. In each of these provinces the teams play each other in a round-robin phase, with two teams progressing to the final.

=== Group stage ===
The 12 teams are drawn into four groups of three teams; seeding is based on performance in the provincial championships. Each team plays each other team in its group once, earning three points for a win and one for a draw.

=== Tiebreakers for group ranking ===
If two teams are level on points, the tie-break is:

- winners of the head-to-head game are ranked ahead
- if the head-to-head match was a draw, then whichever team scored more points in the game is ranked ahead (e.g. 0-18 beats 2-12)
- if the head-to-head match was an exact draw, ranking is determined by the points difference (i.e. total scored minus total conceded in all games)
- if the points difference is equal, ranking is determined by the total scored

If three teams are level on league points, rankings are determined solely by points difference.

=== Relegation ===
The last-placed teams in the groups play off to decide which team is relegated to the All-Ireland Intermediate Ladies' Football Championship.

=== Knockout stage ===
The top two in each group progress to the All-Ireland quarter-finals. Quarter-finals and semi-finals are "results on the day," with 20 minutes' extra time being played in the event of a draw, and a free-kick shootout being taken from a 30 m (33 yd) distance in the event of a draw after extra time. If the All-Ireland final is a draw, the game is replayed on 16/17 August, but not at Croke Park.

== Provincial championships ==
=== Connacht Championship ===
==== Group stage ====
| Pos | Team | Pld | W | D | L | PF | PA | PD | Pts | Qualification |
|---|---|---|---|---|---|---|---|---|---|---|
| 1 | Galway | 2 | 2 | 0 | 0 | 47 | 14 | +33 | 6 | Advance to Connacht final |
| 2 | Mayo | 2 | 1 | 0 | 1 | 26 | 33 | −7 | 3 | Advance to Connacht final |
| 3 | Leitrim | 2 | 0 | 0 | 2 | 19 | 45 | −26 | 0 | |

Source: connachtladiesgaelic.com
Rules for classification: Tiebreakers

==== Final ====
25 May 2025
13:00 IST (UTC+1)
Final

Report

| Mayo | 1-04 (7) – (16) 1-13 | Galway |

MacHale Park, Castlebar

=== Leinster Championship ===
==== Group stage ====
| Pos | Team | Pld | W | D | L | PF | PA | PD | Pts | Qualification |
|---|---|---|---|---|---|---|---|---|---|---|
| 1 | Dublin | 2 | 2 | 0 | 0 | 37 | 17 | +20 | 6 | Advance to Leinster final |
| 2 | Meath | 2 | 1 | 0 | 1 | 29 | 32 | −3 | 3 | Advance to Leinster final |
| 3 | Kildare | 2 | 0 | 0 | 2 | 27 | 44 | −17 | 0 | |

Source: leinsterladiesgaelic.ie
Rules for classification: Tiebreakers

==== Final ====
YouTube

11 May 2025
15:00 IST (UTC+1)
Final

Report

| Dublin | 2-13 (19) – (15) 1-12 | Meath |

Croke Park, Dublin
Referee: Barry Redmond (Wexford)

=== Munster Championship ===
==== Group stage ====
| Pos | Team | Pld | W | D | L | PF | PA | PD | Pts | Qualification |
|---|---|---|---|---|---|---|---|---|---|---|
| 1 | Kerry | 3 | 2 | 1 | 0 | 40 | 33 | +7 | 7 | Advance to Munster final |
| 2 | Waterford | 3 | 2 | 0 | 1 | 50 | 37 | +13 | 6 | Advance to Munster final |
| 3 | Cork | 3 | 1 | 0 | 2 | 44 | 48 | −4 | 3 | |
| 4 | Tipperary | 3 | 0 | 1 | 2 | 30 | 46 | −16 | 1 | |

Source: kerryladiesfootball.com
Rules for classification: Tiebreakers

==== Final ====
25 May 2025
14:00 IST (UTC+1)
Final

Report

| Kerry | 2-06 (12) – (10) 0-10 | Waterford |

Mallow GAA Complex, Mallow
Referee: Conor McCarthy (Cork)

=== Ulster Championship ===
10 May 2025
15:00 IST (UTC+1)
Final

| Donegal | 0-6 (6) – (17) 3-08 | Armagh |

St Tiernach's Park, Clones

== Group stage ==
=== Group 1 ===
| Pos | Team | Pld | W | D | L | PF | PA | PD | Pts | Qualification |
|---|---|---|---|---|---|---|---|---|---|---|
| 1 | Galway | 2 | 2 | 0 | 0 | 30 | 12 | +18 | 6 | Advance to quarter-finals |
| 2 | Tipperary | 2 | 1 | 0 | 1 | 18 | 25 | −7 | 3 | Advance to quarter-finals |
| 3 | Donegal | 2 | 0 | 0 | 2 | 14 | 25 | −11 | 0 | Advance to relegation playoffs |

Source: ladiesgaelic.ie
Rules for classification: Tiebreakers

=== Group 2 ===
| Pos | Team | Pld | W | D | L | PF | PA | PD | Pts | Qualification |
|---|---|---|---|---|---|---|---|---|---|---|
| 1 | Kerry | 2 | 2 | 0 | 0 | 35 | 22 | +13 | 6 | Advance to quarter-finals |
| 2 | Cork | 2 | 1 | 0 | 1 | 28 | 39 | −11 | 3 | Advance to quarter-finals |
| 3 | Mayo | 2 | 0 | 0 | 2 | 24 | 26 | −2 | 0 | Advance to relegation playoffs |

Source: ladiesgaelic.ie
Rules for classification: Tiebreakers

=== Group 3 ===
| Pos | Team | Pld | W | D | L | PF | PA | PD | Pts | Qualification |
|---|---|---|---|---|---|---|---|---|---|---|
| 1 | Meath | 2 | 1 | 1 | 0 | 24 | 21 | +3 | 4 | Advance to quarter-finals |
| 2 | Kildare | 2 | 1 | 0 | 1 | 19 | 20 | −1 | 3 | Advance to quarter-finals |
| 3 | Armagh | 2 | 0 | 1 | 1 | 30 | 32 | −2 | 1 | Advance to relegation playoffs |

Source: ladiesgaelic.ie
Rules for classification: Tiebreakers

=== Group 4 ===
| Pos | Team | Pld | W | D | L | PF | PA | PD | Pts | Qualification |
|---|---|---|---|---|---|---|---|---|---|---|
| 1 | Dublin | 2 | 1 | 1 | 0 | 58 | 23 | +35 | 4 | Advance to quarter-finals |
| 2 | Waterford | 2 | 1 | 1 | 0 | 50 | 29 | +21 | 4 | Advance to quarter-finals |
| 3 | Leitrim | 2 | 0 | 0 | 2 | 20 | 76 | −56 | 0 | Advance to relegation playoffs |

Source: ladiesgaelic.ie
Rules for classification: Tiebreakers

== Relegation playoffs ==
5 July 2025
14:00 BST (UTC+1)
Relegation Qualifier

Report

| Donegal | 0-05 (5) – (15) 0-15 | Armagh |
|---|---|---|
(HT: 0-01 – 0-11)

Mullaghmoyle Park, Stewartstown
Referee: Anthony Marron

5 July 2025
14:00 IST (UTC+1)
Relegation Qualifier

| Mayo | 2-14 (20) – (13) 0-13 | Leitrim |

Kilcoyne Park, Tubbercurry
Referee: Gus Chapman

12 July 2025
14:00 BST (UTC+1)
Relegation Play-off

Report

| Donegal | 2-15 (21) – (15) 1-12 | Leitrim |
|---|---|---|
(HT: 2-07 – 1-05)

Emmett Park, Lisnaskea
Referee: Philip Conway

Leitrim are relegated to the All-Ireland Intermediate Ladies' Football Championship for 2026.

== Knockout stage ==
=== Bracket ===
Quarter-finals
Kerry | 3-11
Kildare | 0-12
Meath | 2-17
Tipperary | 1-6
Dublin | 3-15
Cork | 0-7
Galway | 1-18
Waterford | 1-12

Semi-finals
Kerry | 1-9
Meath | 2-12
Dublin (a.e.t.) | 3-14
Galway | 2-14

Final
Meath | 0-10
Dublin | 2-16

=== Fixtures and results ===
TG4

5 July 2025
13:15 IST (UTC+1)
Quarter-Final 2

Report

| Dublin | 3-15 (24) – (7) 0-07 | Cork |

Parnell Park, Donnycarney
Referee: Brendan Rice

TG4

5 July 2025
15:15 IST (UTC+1)
Quarter-Final 4

Report

| Galway | 1-18 (21) – (15) 1-12 | Waterford |

Tuam Stadium, Tuam
Referee: Jonathan Murphy

TG4

5 July 2025
19:30 IST (UTC+1)
Quarter-Final 1

Report

| Kerry | 3-11 (20) – (12) 0-12 | Kildare |

Austin Stack Park, Tralee
Referee: Kevin Phelan

TG4

6 July 2025
17:15 IST (UTC+1)
Quarter-Final 3

Report

| Meath | 2-17 (23) – (12) 1-09 | Tipperary |
|---|---|---|
(HT: 2-9 – 0-2)

Páirc Tailteann, Navan
Referee: Shane Curley (Galway)

TG4

19 July 2025
17:15 IST (UTC+1)
Semi-Final

Report

| Kerry | 1-09 (12) – (18) 2-12 | Meath |
|---|---|---|
(HT: 0-6 – 1-5)

O'Connor Park, Tullamore

TG4

19 July 2025
19:30 IST (UTC+1)
Semi-Final

Report

| Dublin | 3-14 (23) – (20) 2-14 (a.e.t.) | Galway |
|---|---|---|
(HT: 1-6 – 0-9) (FT: 1-10 – 0-13)

O'Connor Park, Tullamore
Referee: Seamus Mulvihill

TG4

3 August 2025
16:15 IST (UTC+1)
All-Ireland Final

Report

| Meath | 0-10 (10) – (22) 2-16 | Dublin |
|---|---|---|
(HT: 0-4 – 2-9)
| Pts: E Duggan 7 (6fs), A Cleary 1, C Smyth 1, V Wall 1 | | Gls: N Hetherton 1, N Owens 1 Pts: H Tyrrell 5 (3fs), C Rowe 4 (2fs), K Sullivan 4, N Hetherton 1, N Crowley 1, O Nolan 1 |

Croke Park, Dublin
Referee: Gus Chapman (Sligo)
Attendance: 48,089

== See also ==
- All-Ireland Intermediate Ladies' Football Championship
- All-Ireland Junior Ladies' Football Championship
- 2025 Ladies' National Football League
