= 1974 All-Ireland Senior Ladies' Football Championship =

Ladies Gaelic football tournament

All-Ireland Senior Ladies' Football Championship 1974
Championship details
- Teams: 8

All-Ireland champions
- Winners: Tipperary (1st win)
- Captain: Kitty Ryan

All Ireland Runners-up
- Runners-up: Offaly
- Captain: Agnes O'Gorman

Provincial champions
- Munster: Tipperary

Championship Statistics

The 1974 All-Ireland Senior Ladies' Football Championship was the inaugural championship. On 18 July 1974 the Ladies Gaelic Football Association was founded at a meeting held at the Hayes' Hotel in Thurles, County Tipperary. At the meeting it was agreed to establish a senior Ladies' Gaelic football inter-county championship. Eight GAA counties, including Cork, Kerry, Roscommon, Laois, Offaly, Galway, Waterford and Tipperary, subsequently decided to enter the inaugural championship. The four Munster counties also agreed to play in an inaugural Munster Senior Ladies' Football Championship. Tipperary won both the Munster and All-Ireland championships, defeating Kerry and Offaly in the respective finals.

== Munster Championship ==
=== Round 1 ===
Tipperary	3–8;2–6	Waterford	Fethard, County Tipperary

Kerry	defeated	Cork

=== Round 2 ===
Tipperary	defeated	Cork

Kerry	defeated	Waterford

=== Munster Final ===
15 September 1974	Tipperary	2–6;2–5	Kerry	Kilsheelan
	Eleanor Carroll (1-?); Mary McGrath (1-?)

Tipperary qualify for the All-Ireland final.

== All-Ireland series ==
=== Quarter finals ===
Laois	^{(Note 1)}	Roscommon

Offaly	5–5;1–3	Galway	Kilcormac

Notes

- ^1 Some accounts say Laois played and defeated Roscommon. Others suggest they received a walkover.

=== Semi-final ===
29 September 1974	Laois	2–6;3–6	Offaly	Portlaoise

=== Final ===
13 October 1974	Tipperary	2–3;2–2	Offaly	Durrow, County Laois
15.30				Referee: Paul O'Sullivan (Kerry)
