= 1974 All-Ireland Senior Ladies' Football Championship final =

1974 All-Ireland Senior Ladies' Football Final
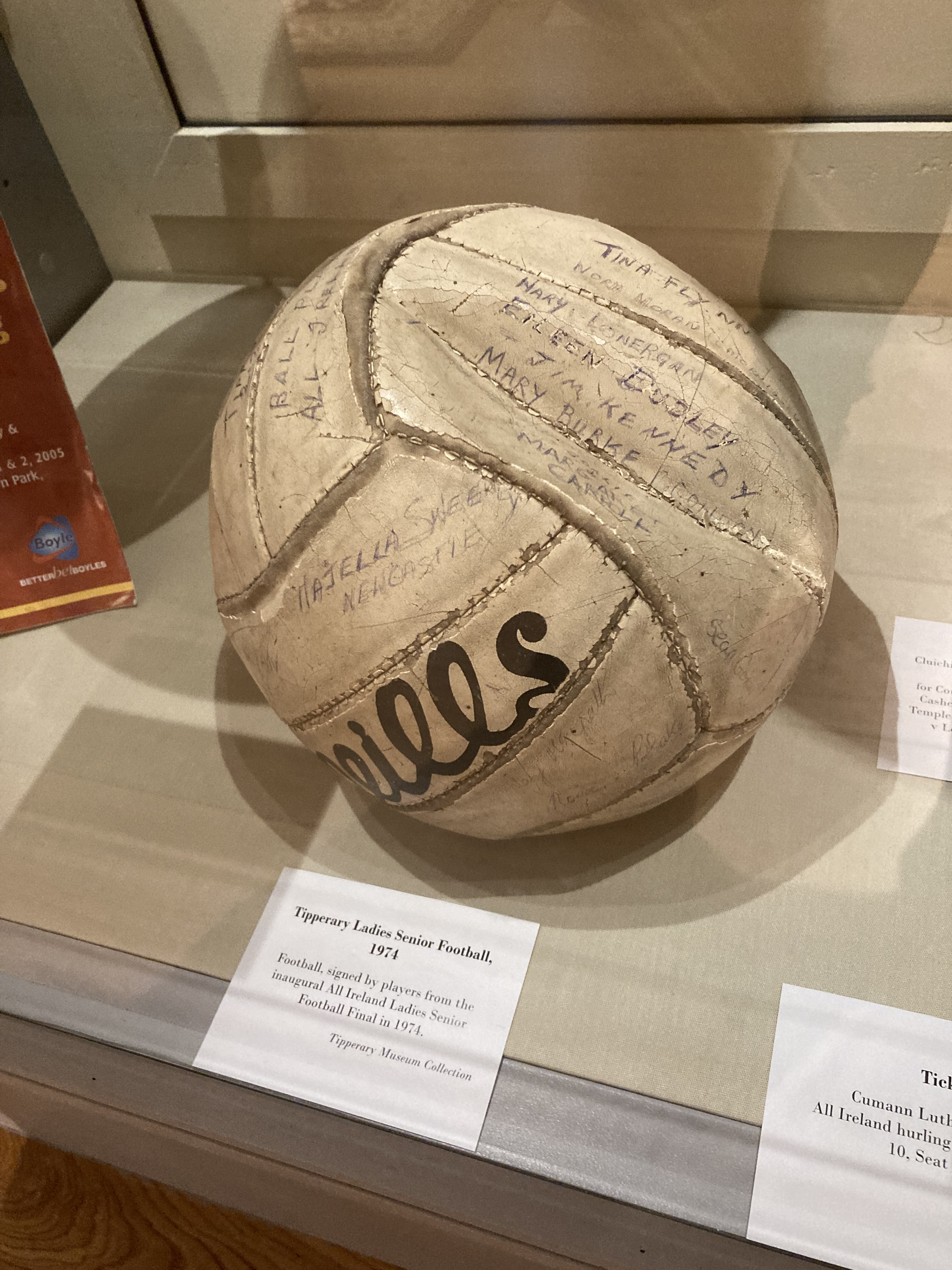
- Ball used in the 1974 Ladies Football Final, signed by Tipperary team and management (Tipperary Museum of Hidden History)
Tipperary	Offaly
2–3	2–2
- Tipperary win the inaugural title.
- Date: 13 October 1974
- Venue: Durrow, County Laois
- Referee: Paul O'Sullivan (Kerry)

The 1974 All-Ireland Senior Ladies' Football Championship Final was the first All-Ireland final. It featured Tipperary and Offaly. Tipperary won the final by 2–3 to 2–2. Towards the end of the first half, Tipperary were leading by 1–2 to 0–0. However within minutes of the restart Offaly took the lead with a goal. Tipperary came back and, with about eight minutes to go, went ahead with a point from a free. Brendan Martin, was a pioneering organiser of ladies' Gaelic football in both Offaly and Dublin, provided a trophy and it was presented to the Tipperary captain, Kitty Ryan, by the Offaly captain, Agnes O'Gorman. The trophy subsequently became known as the Brendan Martin Cup. Brendan Martin died in 2024.

== Match info ==
13 October 1974
15.30

Tipperary	2–3;2–2	Offaly

Durrow, County Laois
Referee: Paul O'Sullivan (Kerry)

== Panels ==
=== Tipperary ===
Trainer
John Alymer
Selectors
Tom Donovan, Teddy Keane
Players
Margaret Carroll (Ardfinnan), Sally Clohessy (Moycarkey), Ann Croke (Mullinahone), Majella Sweeney (Newcastle), Ena Hackett (Newcastle), Tina Flynn (Ardfinnan), Betty Looby (Golden), Catherine Keane (Mullinahone), Eileen Dudley (Cashel/Golden), Susan O'Gorman (Ardfinnan), Josephine Keane (Mullinahone), Eleanor Carroll (Ardfinnan), Lillian Gorey (Killusty/St. Bridgets), Kitty Ryan (c) (Ardfinnan), Mary McGrath (Emly), Mary Power (Mullinahone), Nora Moran (Newcastle), Mary Lonergan (Emly), Mary Burke (Emly), Alice Morris (Moycarkey), Cait O'Dwyer (Moycarkey), Ann Clohessy (Moycarkey), Marian Bryan (Moycarkey), Ann Bryan (Moycarkey), G Ryan (Cappawhite), B Butler (Cappawhite), Noreen Blake (Golden), Katherine Keane (Mullinahone)
