= Tipperary Museum of Hidden History =

- Location within Ireland
- Established: 1940s (Clonmel museum); 2000 (current building); 2018 (in current format with current name)
- Location: Clonmel, County Tipperary, Ireland
- Coordinates: 52°21′20″N 7°41′55″W
- Type: local history museum
- Accreditation: Museum Standards Programme for Ireland
- Collection size: 25,000 objects
- Curator: Marie McMahon
- Owner: Tipperary County Council
- Public transit access: Clonmel railway station Clonmel M&S Davis Road bus stop (route 717)
- Parking: on-site
- Website: hiddenhistory.ie

The Tipperary Museum of Hidden History is a local history museum in Clonmel, County Tipperary, Ireland. It is designated as museum by the National Museum of Ireland and has full accreditation in the Museum Standards Programme for Ireland (MSPI).

== History ==
A museum for Clonmel was founded in the 1940s. It opened on new premises on Mick Delahunty Square in 2000, and was renamed the South Tipperary County Museum soon after. It was relaunched as the "Tipperary Museum of Hidden History" in October 2019 after a €500,000 upgrade.

The museum was closed during the COVID-19 pandemic; it marked its reopening in 2021 with a CD of lost Mick Delahunty music from 1948. In the same year, it received €15,000 in funding for the "Hidden Gems" exhibition.

== Collection ==
The museum holds items and documents from the history of Clonmel and County Tipperary. Notable items include:

- Grangemockler shirt worn by Michael Hogan, footballer killed on Bloody Sunday (1920); it is not the shirt he was wearing when he was shot, however.
- exhibitions on local sportspeople
- the ball used in the 1974 All-Ireland Senior Ladies' Football Championship final
- a death mask of Oliver Cromwell
- items relating to musicians Frank Patterson, Mick Delahunty
- the Carrick-on-Suir hoard, 81 gold coins (guineas and half guineas) dating from 1664 to 1701

== Gallery ==
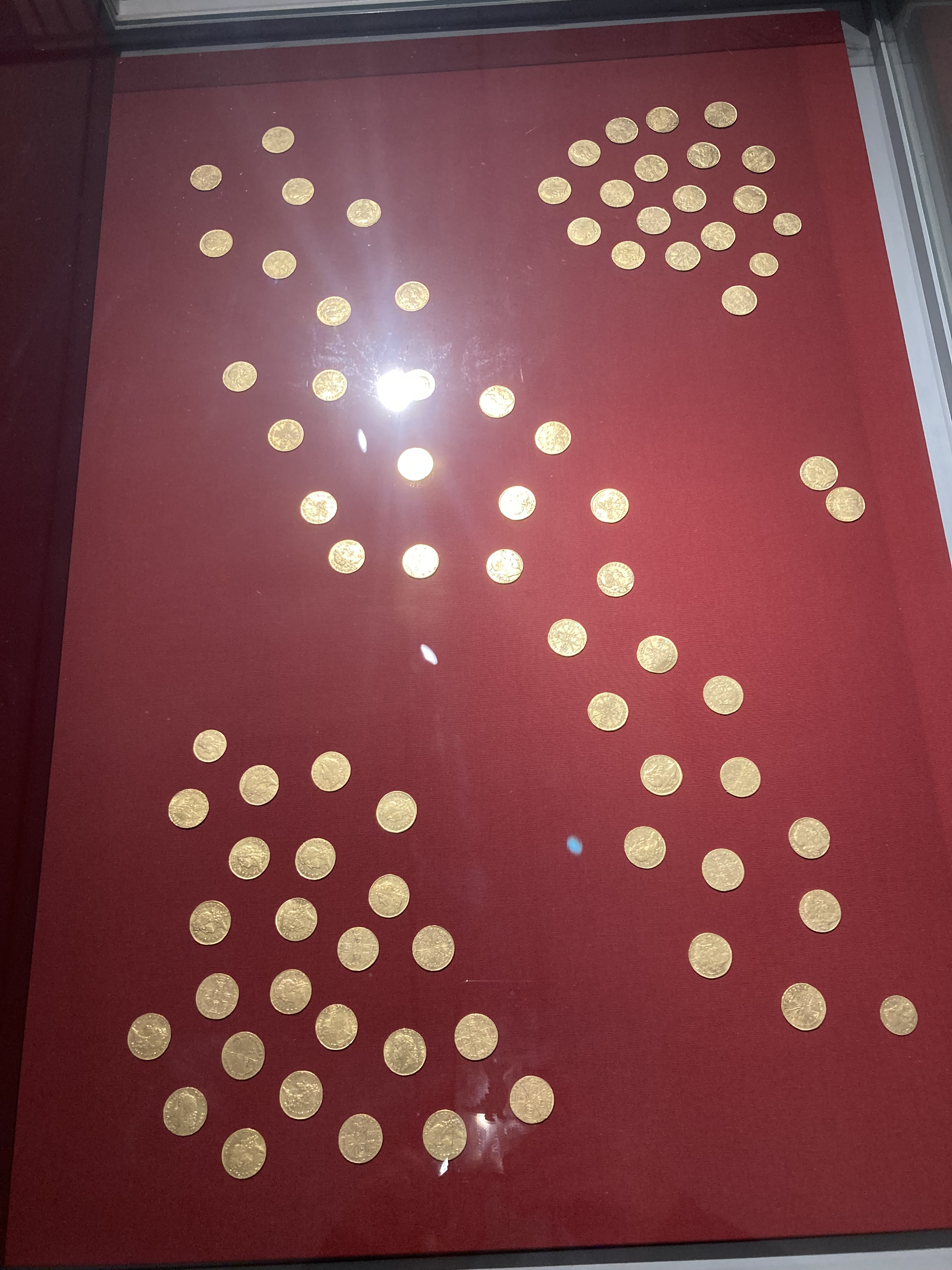
Carrick-on-Suir hoard

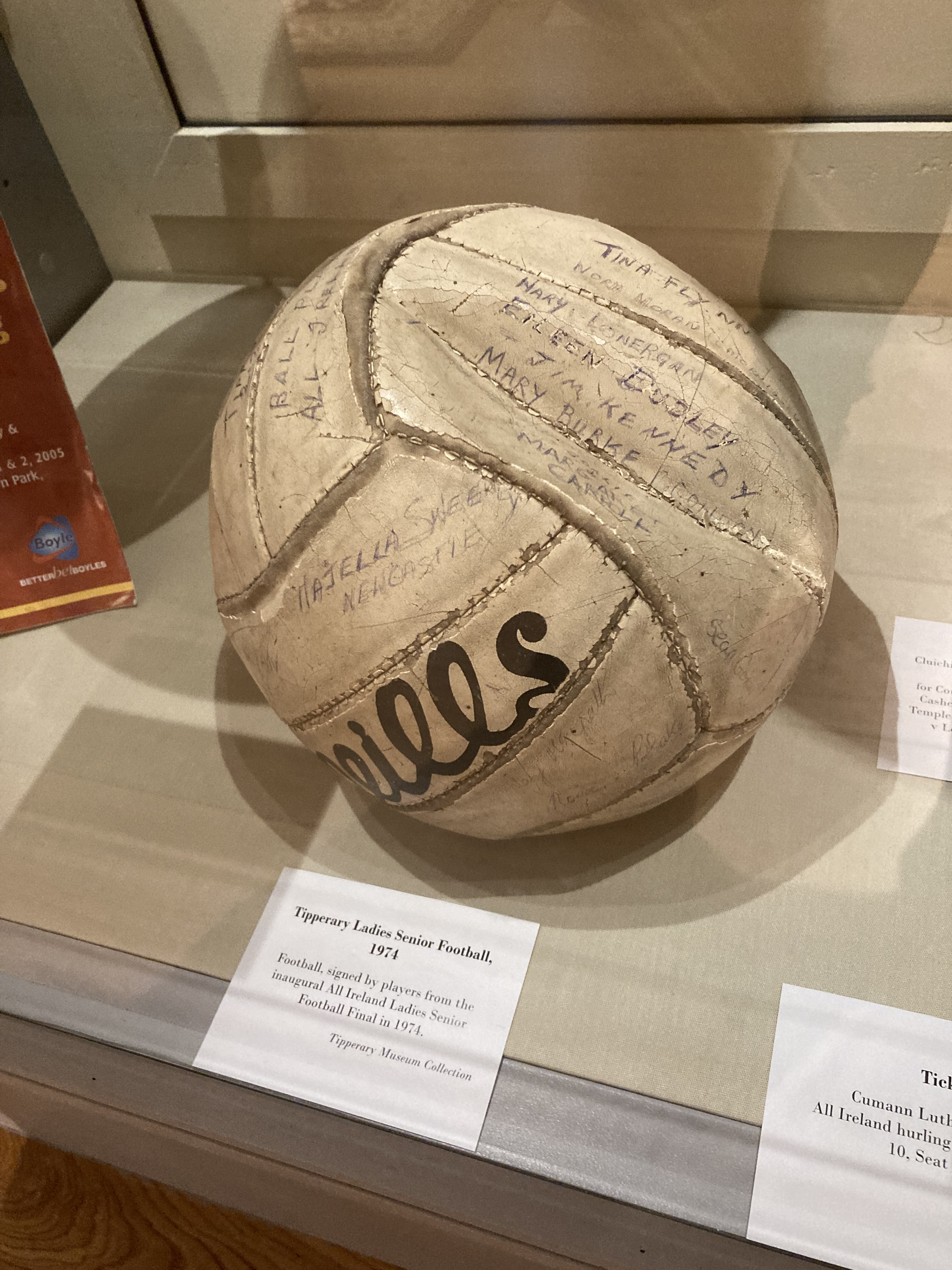
Ball used in the 1974 All-Ireland Senior Ladies' Football Championship final

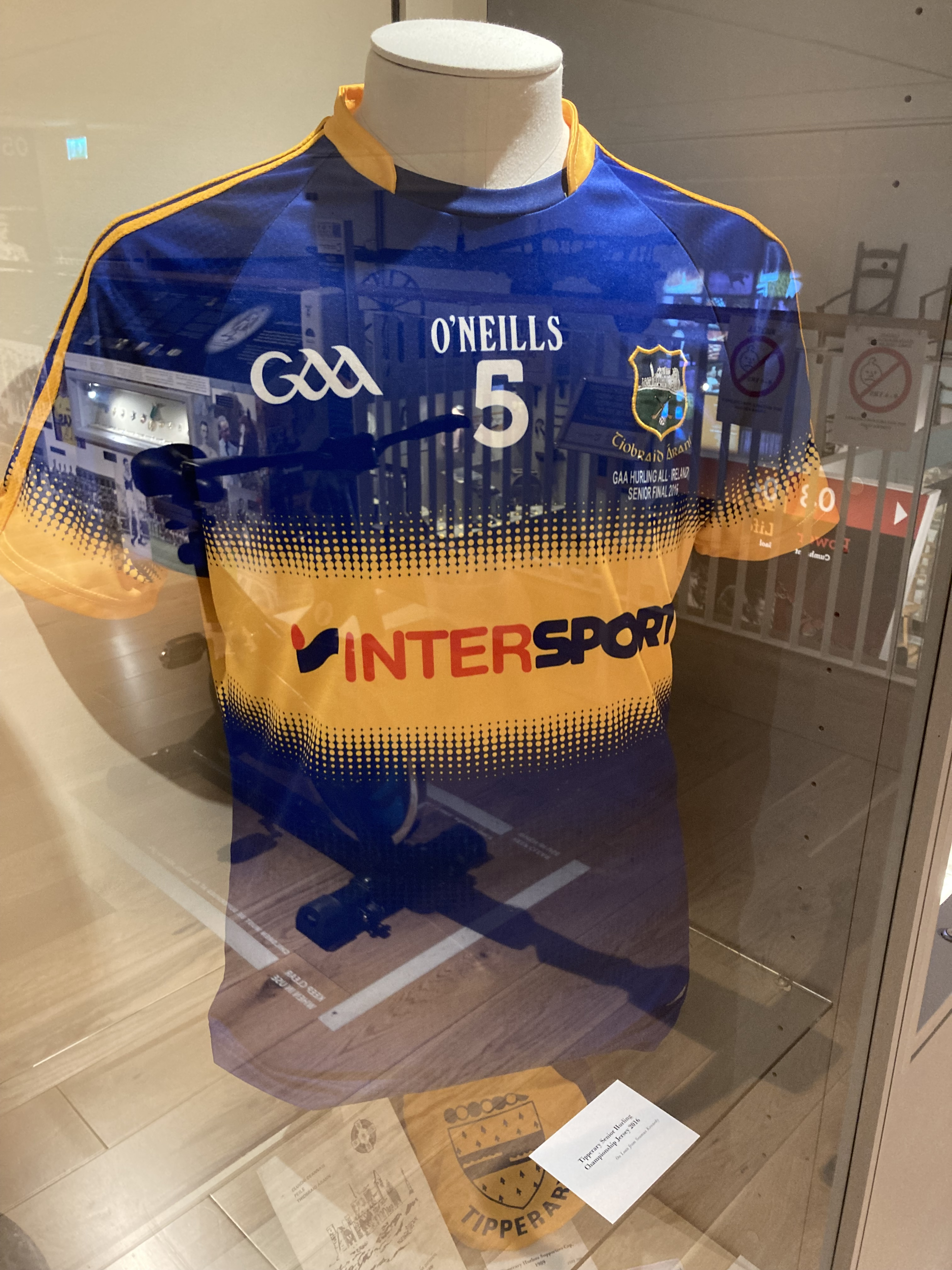
Shirt worn by Séamus Kennedy in the 2016 All-Ireland Senior Hurling Championship Final

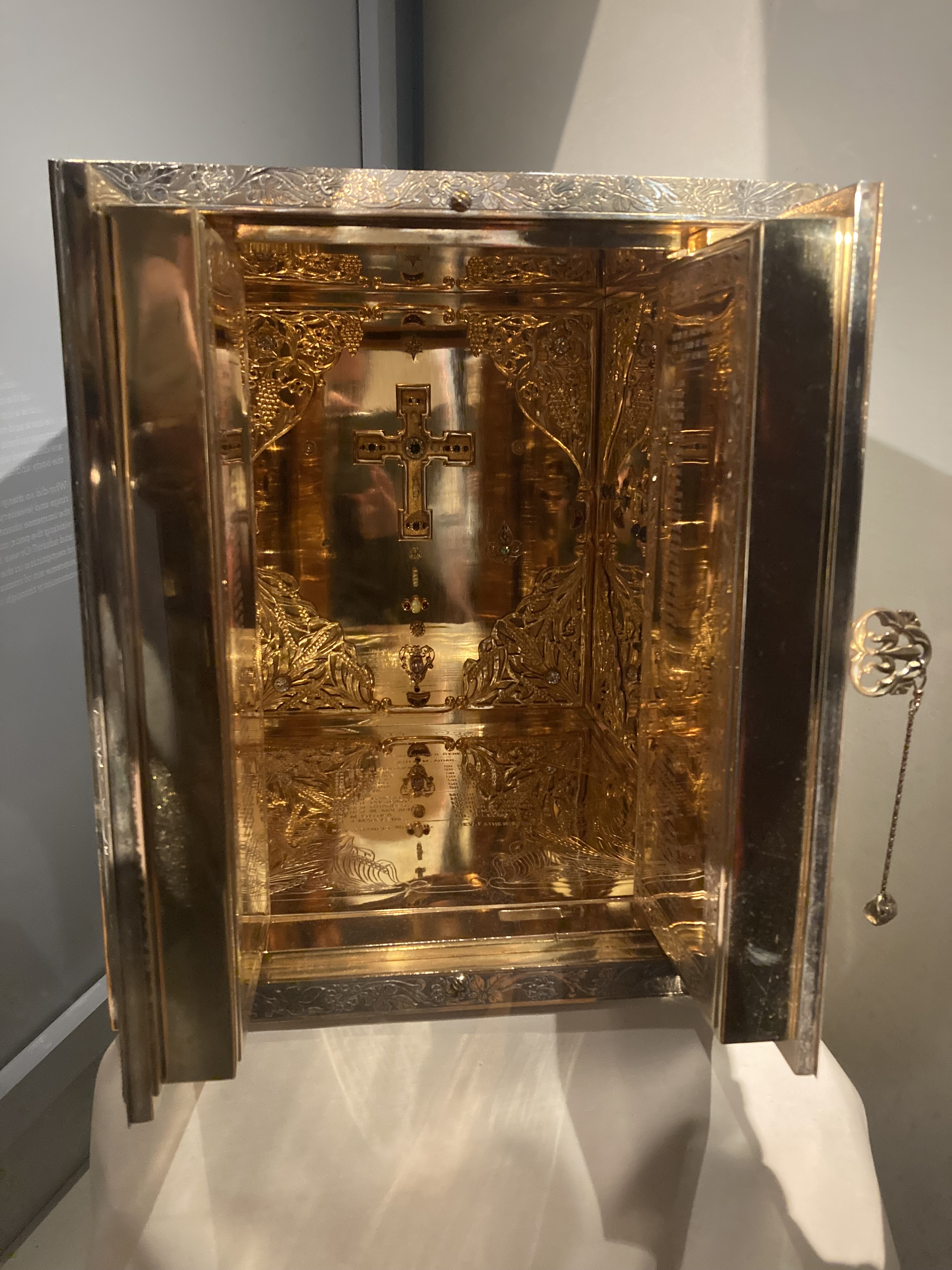
Gold tabernacle made by Clonmel Sisters of Charity with jewellery donated by local people

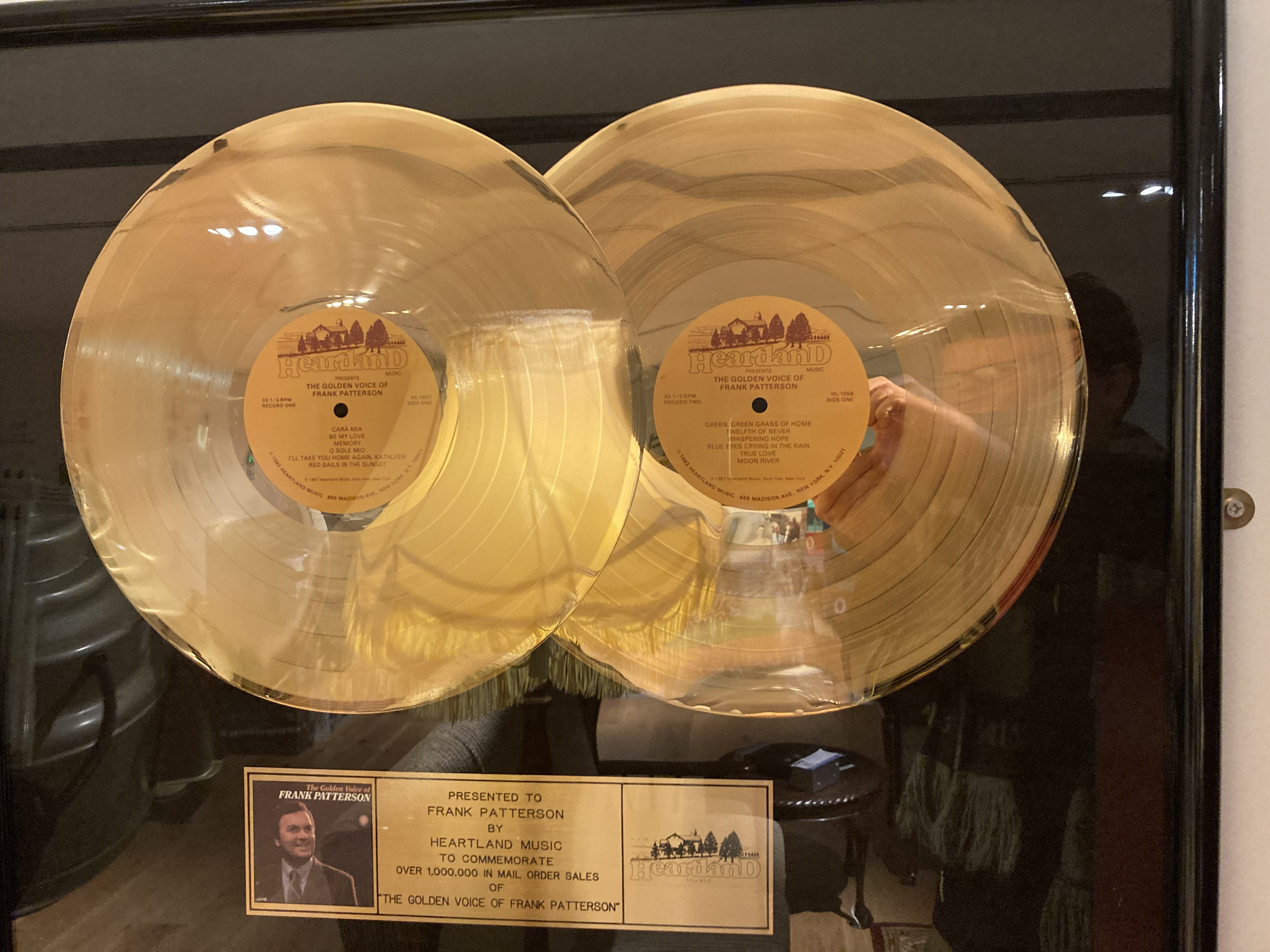
Frank Patterson gold record
