= Geraldine Park =

Stadium in Athy, County Kildare, Ireland

- Páirc na nGearaltach
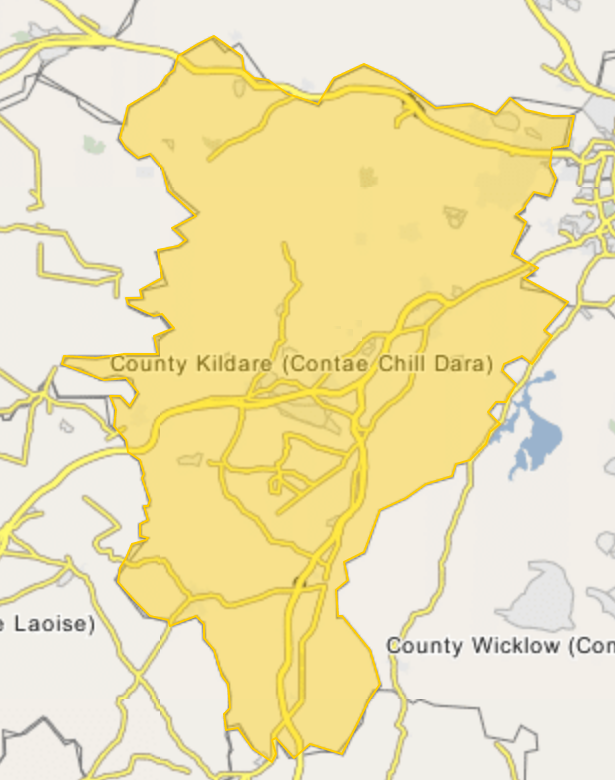
- Location within County Kildare Geraldine Park (Ireland)
- Location: Athy, County Kildare, Ireland
- Coordinates: 52°59′34.894″N 6°58′10.657″W
- Public transit: Athy railway station Athy bus stop (William Street)
- Owner: Athy GAA
- Capacity: 2,000
- Field size: 135 x 85 m
- Surface: grass

Geraldine Park is a GAA stadium in Athy, County Kildare, Ireland. It is the main ground of Athy GAA's Gaelic football and hurling teams and has also hosted inter-county fixtures.

== History ==
First rented from the Kildare Agricultural Society in 1905, Athy GAA grounds was quickly developed in order to stage the 1906 All-Ireland Senior Football Championship Final, the replay of the 1908 All-Ireland Senior Hurling Championship Final, the Leinster football finals of 1907, 1908, 1942 and 1944, and the Leinster hurling final of 1907. Geraldine Park was opened in 1930 and developed under the guidance of Fintan Brennan. It was also the venue for the 1975 All-Ireland Senior Ladies' Football Championship final. To the seating of the 1940s was added a stand in 1984. The dressing rooms, built in 1964 (now replaced), had a holy water font near the exit for use of teams running on to the pitch.

Geraldine Park hosted the first leg of the Shinty/Hurling International Series in 2011, Ireland defeating Scotland, 1–16 to 2–8.

== See also ==
- List of Gaelic Athletic Association stadiums
