= 1975 All-Ireland Senior Ladies' Football Championship =

Ladies Gaelic football tournament

All-Ireland Senior Ladies' Football Championship 1975
Championship details
- Teams: 8

All-Ireland champions
- Winners: Tipperary (2nd win)

All Ireland Runners-up
- Runners-up: Galway

Provincial champions

Championship Statistics

The 1975 All-Ireland Senior Ladies' Football Championship was won by Tipperary.

== Results ==
=== Connacht ===
Galway defeated Roscommon in the final.

=== Munster ===
Played on a league system.

- 6 July: Kerry 2-9 Cork 0-3 (Castleisland)
- 20 July: Kerry 4-8 Waterford 2-2 (Dungarvan)
- 17 August: Tipperary 7-3 Kerry 1-5 (Fitzgerald Stadium, Killarney)

=== All-Ireland ===
13 October 1975
Final

| Tipperary | 1–4 – 0–0 | Offaly |

Geraldine Park, Athy
Attendance: 700
Referee: Mary Corcoran (Kilkenny)
