= 1977 All-Ireland Senior Ladies' Football Championship final =

1977 All-Ireland Senior Ladies' Football Final
- Event: 1977 All-Ireland Senior Ladies' Football Championship
Cavan	Roscommon
4–3	2–3
- Date: 27 November 1977
- Venue: Dr. Hyde Park, Roscommon
- Attendance: 3,000

The 1977 All-Ireland Senior Ladies' Football Championship final was the fourth All-Ireland Final and the deciding match of the 1977 All-Ireland Senior Ladies' Football Championship, an inter-county ladies' Gaelic football tournament for the top teams in Ireland.

Cavan won by two goals – much media attention was focused on their midfielder Pauline Gibbons, who left the team mid-season to become an Augustinian nun, and received special permission from the Mother Superior to return for the final.

Cavan reached the final after a successful objection to the constitution of Offaly's team in the All Ireland semifinal, which Offaly won by six points. Cavan became the first side to win a title after losing a game in the Ladies AISFC and the last until Cork in 2013.
