= 1980 All-Ireland Senior Ladies' Football Championship final =

1980 All-Ireland Senior Ladies' Football Final
- Event: 1980 All-Ireland Senior Ladies' Football Championship
| Tipperary | Cavan |
| 1–1 | 0–1 |
- Date: 1980
- City: Edenderry

The 1980 All-Ireland Senior Ladies' Football Championship final was the seventh All-Ireland Final and the deciding match of the 1980 All-Ireland Senior Ladies' Football Championship, an inter-county ladies' Gaelic football tournament for the top teams in Ireland.

Cavan dominated the game but couldn't get the needed scores.
