= 1978 All-Ireland Senior Ladies' Football Championship final =

1978 All-Ireland Senior Ladies' Football Final
- Event: 1978 All-Ireland Senior Ladies' Football Championship
Roscommon	Tipperary
2–3	0–5
- Date: 10 September 1978
- Venue: Dr. Hyde Park, Ballinasloe
- Weather: Wet

The 1978 All-Ireland Senior Ladies' Football Championship final was the fifth All-Ireland Final and the deciding match of the 1978 All-Ireland Senior Ladies' Football Championship, an inter-county ladies' Gaelic football tournament for the top teams in Ireland.

The wet conditions didn't suit Roscommon's speedy players, but they won anyway.

Madeline Treacy and Triona Moran scored the goals. Liz O'Brien pitched in with two points. Mary Shield registered Roscommon's remaining score.
