= 1979 All-Ireland Senior Ladies' Football Championship final =

1979 All-Ireland Senior Ladies' Football Final
- Event: 1979 All-Ireland Senior Ladies' Football Championship
Offaly	Tipperary
2–6	3–3
- Date: 1979

1979 All-Ireland Senior Ladies' Football Final Replay
Offaly	Tipperary
3–6	1–6
- Date: 1979
- Venue: McCann Park, Portarlington

The 1979 All-Ireland Senior Ladies' Football Championship final was the sixth All-Ireland Final and the deciding match of the 1979 All-Ireland Senior Ladies' Football Championship, an inter-county ladies' Gaelic football tournament for the top teams in Ireland.

Offaly were the winners after a replay. The replay was held at McCann Park in Portarlington.
