= 1998 All-Ireland Senior Ladies' Football Championship final =

1998 All-Ireland Senior Ladies' Football Final
- Event: 1998 All-Ireland Senior Ladies' Football Championship
Waterford	Monaghan
1–16	4–7
- Date: 4 October 1998
- Venue: Croke Park, Dublin
- Attendance: 16,421

1998 All-Ireland Senior Ladies' Football Final Replay
Waterford	Monaghan
2–14	3–8
- Date: 25 October 1998
- Venue: Croke Park, Dublin
- Attendance: 13,551

The 1998 All-Ireland Senior Ladies' Football Championship final was the 25th All-Ireland Final and the deciding match of the 1998 All-Ireland Senior Ladies' Football Championship, an inter-county ladies' Gaelic football tournament for the top teams in Ireland.

This was the first ladies' football final to be televised live. Monaghan had the best of the first half of the first game, leading 3–4 to 0–7. Waterford gradually clawed their way back and Monaghan needed a late Ciara McGuinness goal to force a replay.

In the replay, Monaghan missed several early goal chances and Waterford had a six-point lead at the break. A brilliant Brenda McAnespie save prevented a late equaliser and Waterford were champions.
