= 2010 All-Ireland Senior Ladies' Football Championship =

All-Ireland Senior Ladies' Football Championship 2010
Championship details
- Dates: 31 July – 26 September 2010
- Teams: 16

All-Ireland champions
- Winners: Dublin (1st win)

All Ireland Runners-up
- Runners-up: Tyrone

Provincial champions

Championship Statistics
- Matches Played: 15

The 2010 All-Ireland Senior Ladies' Football Championship began on 31 July 2010. Dublin were the winners, with a convincing win over Tyrone in the final.

== Structure ==
- Sixteen teams compete.
  - The top four teams from 2009 receive byes to the quarter-finals.
  - The quarter-finalists from 2009 receive byes to the second round.
  - The other eight teams play in the first round.
- All games are knockout matches, drawn games being replayed.
- The first-round losers playoff, with one team being relegated to the intermediate championship for 2011. Teams must spend two years as a senior team before they are eligible for relegation; teams that have not done so are exempt from relegation.

== Fixtures and results ==
=== Early stages ===
July 31
1st Round

Down	1–9 – 4–13	Kildare

Fingallians, Swords

August 1
1st Round

Tyrone	6–22 – 2–9	Leitrim

Shannon Gaels, Labasheeda

August 2
1st Round

Mayo	1–8 – 0–12	Kerry

Fr. McNally Park, Banagher

August 2
1st Round

Tipperary	2–16 – 0–9	Meath

O'Connor Park, Tullamore

August 7
2nd Round

Tyrone	5–20 – 2–7	Sligo

Cusack Park, Mullingar

August 7
2nd Round

Laois	3–13 – 1–11	Kildare

Cusack Park, Mullingar

August 8
2nd Round

Kerry	1–19 – 2–7	Armagh

Páirc Chiaráin, Athlone

August 8
2nd Round

Clare	2–15 – 0–9	Tipperary

Childers Road, Claughaun

=== Final stages ===
August 14
Quarter-final

Galway	1–11 – 2–9	Kerry

Fr. McNally Park, Banagher

August 14
Quarter-final

Clare	2–12 – 2–18	Dublin

Fr. McNally Park, Banagher

August 21
Quarter-final

Cork	0–13 – 3–11	Tyrone

Fr. McNally Park, Banagher

August 21
Quarter-final

Monaghan	0–9 – 0–12	Laois

Fr. McNally Park, Banagher

August 28
Semi-final

Dublin	1–8 – 0–9	Laois

Dr. Cullen Park, Carlow

September 4
Semi-final

Tyrone	3–10 – 2–13	Kerry

Ballymahon

September 11
Semi-final replay

Tyrone	1–9 – 0–11	Kerry

Fr. McNally Park, Banagher

26 September 2010

Dublin	3–16; 0–9	Tyrone
Sinéad Aherne (2-7); Amy McGuinness (1-3); Siobhán McGrath (0-1); Elaine Kelly (0-2); Lyndsey Davey (0-2); Gemma Fay (0-1); Lindsay Peat (0-1)		Gemma Begley (0-4); Joline Donnelly (0-3); Cathy Donnelly (0-1); Nina Murphy (0-1)

Croke Park, Dublin
Attendance: 21,750
Referee: K Delahunty (Tipperary)
