= 1985 All-Ireland Senior Ladies' Football Championship final =

1985 All-Ireland Senior Ladies' Football Final
- Event: 1985 All-Ireland Senior Ladies' Football Championship
Kerry	Laois
2–9	0–5
- Date: 8 September 1985
- Venue: Páirc Uí Chaoimh, Cork
- Attendance: 5,000

The 1985 All-Ireland Senior Ladies' Football Championship final was the twelfth All-Ireland Final and the deciding match of the 1985 All-Ireland Senior Ladies' Football Championship, an inter-county ladies' Gaelic football tournament for the top teams in Ireland.

The final was played before the semi-final of the Cork Senior Hurling Championship in Páirc Uí Chaoimh. This was the last final not played in Croke Park. Mary Jo Curran was the star as Kerry ran out ten-point winners.
