= 1997 All-Ireland Senior Ladies' Football Championship final =

1997 All-Ireland Senior Ladies' Football Final
- Event: 1997 All-Ireland Senior Ladies' Football Championship
Monaghan	Waterford
2–15	1–16
- Date: 12 October 1997
- Venue: Croke Park, Dublin

The 1997 All-Ireland Senior Ladies' Football Championship final was the 24th All-Ireland Final and the deciding match of the 1997 All-Ireland Senior Ladies' Football Championship, an inter-county ladies' Gaelic football tournament for the top teams in Ireland.

Monaghan led 2–9 to 1–3 at half-time and won by two points in the end.
