= 1983 All-Ireland Senior Ladies' Football Championship final =

1983 All-Ireland Senior Ladies' Football Final
- Event: 1983 All-Ireland Senior Ladies' Football Championship
Kerry	Wexford
4–6	1–7
- Date: 11 September 1983
- Venue: Kilsheelan-Kilcash GAA Grounds, Kilsheelan

The 1983 All-Ireland Senior Ladies' Football Championship final was the tenth All-Ireland Final and the deciding match of the 1983 All-Ireland Senior Ladies' Football Championship, an inter-county ladies' Gaelic football tournament for the top teams in Ireland.

Wexford led at half-time but Kerry fought back to draw level with seven minutes to go, and won by eight points in the end.
