= 1988 All-Ireland Senior Ladies' Football Championship final =

1988 All-Ireland Senior Ladies' Football Final
- Event: 1988 All-Ireland Senior Ladies' Football Championship
Kerry	Laois
2–12	3–3
- Date: 8 September 1988
- Venue: Páirc Uí Chaoimh, Cork
- Weather: Sunny

The 1988 All-Ireland Senior Ladies' Football Championship final was the twelfth All-Ireland Final and the deciding match of the 1988 All-Ireland Senior Ladies' Football Championship, an inter-county ladies' Gaelic football tournament for the top teams in Ireland.

Laois goaled after just two minutes but Kerry led 0–5 to 1–1 at half-time. Lil O'Sullivan scored a goal for Kerry soon after and they won their eighth title in a row convincingly.
