= 2022 All-Ireland Senior Ladies' Football Championship final =

Gaelic football match

2022 All-Ireland Senior Ladies' Football Final
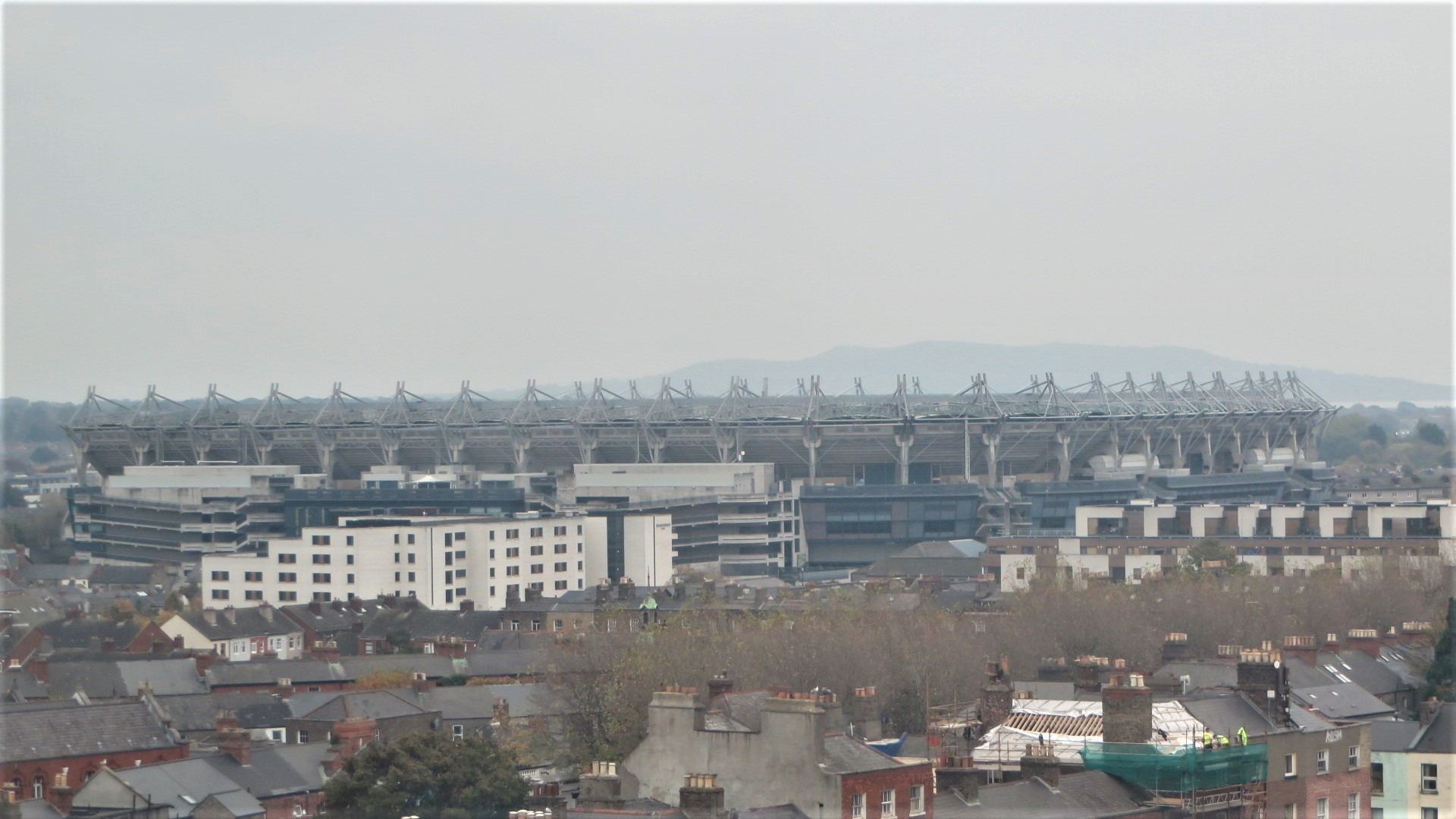
- Event: 2022 All-Ireland Senior Ladies' Football Championship
Kerry	Meath
1-07	3-10
- Date: 31 July 2022
- Venue: Croke Park, Dublin
- Player of the Match: Niamh O’Sullivan
- Referee: Maggie Farrelly (Cavan)
- Attendance: 46,440
- Weather: Dry and Sunny

The 2022 All-Ireland Senior Ladies' Football Championship final was the 49th All-Ireland Final and the deciding match of the 2022 All-Ireland Senior Ladies' Football Championship, an inter-county ladies' Gaelic football tournament for the county teams of Ireland. Meath retained the title, beating Kerry in the final. If the game had been a draw, a replay would have been played on 13 or 14 August.

== Match info ==
TG4

31 July 2022
16:00
Final

Report

Kerry	1-07 – 3-10	Meath
(HT: 1-05 - 1-08)
Gls: L Ní Mhuircheartaigh 1 Pts: L Ní Mhuircheartaigh 2fs, S O'Shea 2, L Scanlon 1, C Murphy 1, P McCarthy 1		Gls: N O'Sullivan 1, E Troy 1, B Lynch 1 Pts: S Grimes 3 (2fs), V Wall 3 (2fs), N O'Sullivan 2, E Troy 1, E Duggan 1f

Croke Park, Dublin
Referee: Maggie Farrelly (Cavan)
Attendance: 46,440

== See also ==
- List of All-Ireland Senior Ladies' Football Championship finals
