= 2021 All-Ireland Senior Ladies' Football Championship =

Gaelic sports competition

All-Ireland Senior Ladies' Football Championship 2021
Championship details
- Dates: 9 July – 5 September 2021
- Teams: 13

All-Ireland champions
- Winners: Meath (1st win)
- Captain: Shauna Ennis
- Manager: Eamonn Murray

All Ireland Runners-up
- Runners-up: Dublin
- Captain: Sinéad Aherne
- Manager: Mick Bohan

Provincial champions

Championship Statistics
- Top Scorer: Aimee Mackin (4-28) (40 points)

The 2021 All-Ireland Senior Ladies' Football Championship was the 48th edition of the Ladies' Gaelic Football Association's premier inter-county ladies' Gaelic Football tournament.

Dublin were the holders and were aiming to complete a five-in-a-row. They met Meath, last year's intermediate champions, in the final. Meath won the final to record their first ever senior football title.

== Format ==
=== Group stage ===
The 13 teams are drawn into one group of four teams and three groups of three teams. Each team play each other team in its group once, earning three points for a win and one for a draw.

=== Relegation ===
The last-placed team in each group play off to decide relegation.

=== Knockout stage ===
The top two in each group progress to the All-Ireland quarter-finals.

== Fixtures and results ==
Group games take place 9–24 July 2021.

Key to colours
Advance to All-Ireland quarter-finals
Relegation playoffs

=== Group 1 ===
Team	Pld	W	D	L	Group Points	Score Difference
Armagh	3	3	0	0	9	+33
Mayo	3	2	0	1	6	–4
Monaghan	3	1	0	2	3	–13
Cavan	3	0	0	3	0	–16

=== Group 2 ===
Team	Pld	W	D	L	Group Points	Score Difference
Cork	2	2	0	0	6	+21
Meath	2	1	0	1	3	+12
Tipperary	2	0	0	2	0	–33

=== Group 3 ===
Team	Pld	W	D	L	Group Points	Score Difference
Dublin	2	2	0	0	6	+27
Waterford	2	1	0	1	3	–4
Tyrone	2	0	0	2	0	–23

=== Group 4 ===
Team	Pld	W	D	L	Group Points	Score Difference
Galway	2	2	0	0	6	+6
Donegal	2	1	0	1	3	–1
Kerry	2	0	0	2	0	–5

== Relegation playoffs ==
14 August 2021
14:00 IST (UTC+1)
Relegation Semi-Final

Report

Tipperary	0-07 – 2-16	Kerry
(HT: 0-04 - 2-07)

Mallow GAA Sports Complex, Mallow
Referee: Kevin Phelan (Laois)

21 August 2021
14:00 IST (UTC+1)
Relegation Semi-Final

Report

Cavan	2-11 – 0-14 (aet)	Tyrone
(HT: 2-05 - 0-05)

St. Tiernach's Park, Clones
Referee: Siobhan Coyle (Donegal)

28 August 2021
14:00 IST (UTC+1)
Relegation Final

Report

Tipperary	7-10 – 3-16	Tyrone
(HT: 5-3 - 0-10)

Kinnegad
Referee: Garryowen McMahon

Tyrone are relegated to the All-Ireland Intermediate Ladies' Football Championship for 2022.

== Finals ==
TG4

1 August 2021
14:00 IST (UTC+1)
Quarter-Final 1

Report

Armagh	1-14 – 3-15	Meath
(HT: 0-06 - 2-07)

St Tiernach’s Park, Clones
Referee: Brendan Rice

TG4

1 August 2021
15:30 IST (UTC+1)
Quarter-Final 2

Report

Cork	0-14 – 0-08	Waterford
(HT: 0-10 - 0-05)

Páirc Uí Chaoimh
Referee: Seamus Mulvihill

TG4

2 August 2021
13:45 IST (UTC+1)
Quarter-Final 3

Report

Galway	1-11 – 1-15	Mayo
(HT: 0-05 - 1-10)

MacHale Park
Referee: Maggie Farrelly

TG4

2 August 2021
16:00 IST (UTC+1)
Quarter-Final 4

Report

Dublin	2-12 – 2-07	Donegal
(HT: 1-06 - 2-02)

Páirc Seán Mac Diarmada
Referee: Shane Curley

TG4

14 August 2021
15:45 IST (UTC+1)
Semi-Final

Report

Dublin	1-17 – 2-09	Mayo
(HT: 1-10 - 2-01)

Croke Park, Dublin
Referee: Seamus Mulvihill

TG4

15 August 2021
15:30 IST (UTC+1)
Semi-Final

Report

Cork	2-10 – 2-12 (a.e.t)	Meath
(HT: 0-04 - 0-04)

Croke Park, Dublin
Referee: Jonathan Murphy

TG4

5 September 2021
16:15 IST (UTC+1)
All-Ireland Final

Report

Meath	1-11 – 0-12	Dublin
(HT: 1-08 - 0-06)

Croke Park, Dublin
Referee: Brendan Rice (Down)

== See also ==
- 2021 All-Ireland Intermediate Ladies' Football Championship
- 2021 All-Ireland Junior Ladies' Football Championship
- 2021 Ladies' National Football League
