= 1987 All-Ireland Senior Ladies' Football Championship final =

1987 All-Ireland Senior Ladies' Football Final
- Event: 1987 All-Ireland Senior Ladies' Football Championship
Kerry	Westmeath
2–10	2–2
- Date: 4 October 1987
- Venue: Croke Park, Dublin

The 1987 All-Ireland Senior Ladies' Football Championship final was the fifteenth All-Ireland Final and the deciding match of the 1987 All-Ireland Senior Ladies' Football Championship, an inter-county ladies' Gaelic football tournament for the top teams in Ireland.

Kerry led 2–3 to 0–0 after fifteen minutes, but Westmeath showed their mettle to fight back to a one-point gap, but they then ran out of steam.
