= Dr Hyde Park =

Gaelic Athletic Association (GAA) stadium in Roscommon, Ireland

King & Moffatt Dr Hyde Park
- Páirc de hÍde
- Interactive map of King & Moffatt Dr Hyde Park
- Location: Athlone Road, Roscommon, F42 AP82, Ireland
- Coordinates: 53°37′30″N 8°10′51″W
- Owner: Roscommon GAA
- Capacity: 18,890 Capacity history: 33,612 18,500 (2011–2015) 20,000 (2015) 18,890
- Field size: 145 x 90 m
- Public transit: Roscommon railway station Roscommon Hospital bus stop (Bus Éireann routes 440, 457)

Construction
- Opened: 1971
- Cost: €1,100,000

Website
- roscommongaels.ie/dr-hyde-park

Dr Hyde Park (Páirc de hÍde in Irish) is a Gaelic Athletic Association (GAA) stadium in Roscommon, Ireland. Built in 1969 and officially opened in 1971, it is the home of the Roscommon county football team, with Athleague being the traditional home for the Roscommon county hurling team. Named after Gaelic scholar and first President of Ireland, Douglas Hyde, the ground previously had a capacity of about 33,612, which was reduced to 18,500 after a nationwide inspection of facilities by the GAA in 2011. At the start of 2023, a refurbishment project began, to increase the ground's capacity to 25,000.

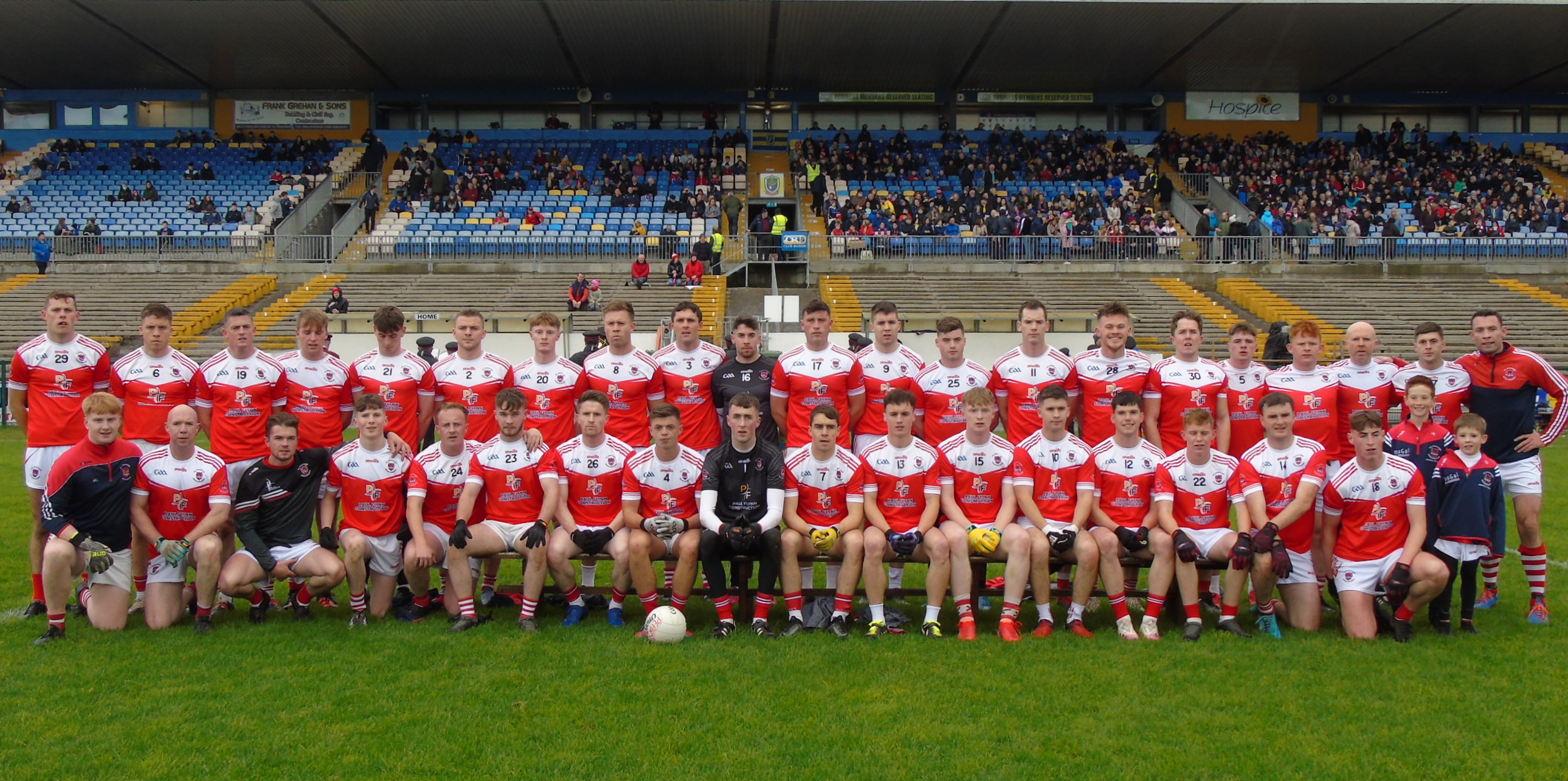
Padraig Pearses team in Dr Hyde Park for the 2021 Roscommon Senior Football Championship final

The ground has hosted numerous Connacht Senior Football Championship finals, both with and without Roscommon's participation. It hosted the 1994 Connacht Final in which Leitrim triumphed over Mayo to win their first title since 1927. Other memorable Connacht finals hosted on this ground include the match between Roscommon and Galway in 1998, Roscommon's last-minute victory over Mayo in 2001 and Sligo's triumph over Galway in 2007. Hyde Park also hosted the 1978,1987 All-Ireland Under-21 Football Championship Finals and 1978 and 1981 All-Ireland Senior Ladies' Football Championship finals.

The ground was, until recently, also home to Roscommon Gaels GAA club who have moved to newly developed grounds at Lisnamult. The grounds consist of four stands; one covered with seating and the other three open terraces. It is located beside the county hospital on the Athlone Road in Roscommon Town. It replaced the former home to Roscommon GAA, St Coman's Park, in 1969.

Roscommon invited Fr. Liam Devine to bless the new grass on the pitch at Dr Hyde Park in 2017.
