= 1989 All-Ireland Senior Ladies' Football Championship final =

1989 All-Ireland Senior Ladies' Football Final
- Event: 1989 All-Ireland Senior Ladies' Football Championship
| Kerry | Wexford |
| 1–14 | 1–5 |
- Date: 8 October 1989
- Venue: Croke Park, Dublin

The 1989 All-Ireland Senior Ladies' Football Championship final was the sixteenth All-Ireland Final and the deciding match of the 1989 All-Ireland Senior Ladies' Football Championship, an inter-county ladies' Gaelic football tournament for the top teams in Ireland.

Wexford scored the first point but Kerry hit six without reply and won in the end without great exertion. Margaret Lawlor-Slattery scored 0–8.
