= 1996 All-Ireland Senior Ladies' Football Championship final =

1996 All-Ireland Senior Ladies' Football Final
- Event: 1996 All-Ireland Senior Ladies' Football Championship
Monaghan	Laois
2–9	2–9
- Date: 29 September 1996
- Venue: Croke Park, Dublin

1996 All-Ireland Senior Ladies' Football Final Replay
Monaghan	Laois
2–11	1–9
- Date: 6 October 1996
- Venue: Croke Park, Dublin

The 1996 All-Ireland Senior Ladies' Football Championship final was the 23rd All-Ireland Final and the deciding match of the 1996 All-Ireland Senior Ladies' Football Championship, an inter-county ladies' Gaelic football tournament for the top teams in Ireland.

Monaghan won after a replay, to give Laois a fifth final loss in a row.
