= 1981 All-Ireland Senior Ladies' Football Championship final =

1981 All-Ireland Senior Ladies' Football Final
- Event: 1981 All-Ireland Senior Ladies' Football Championship
Offaly	Cavan
1–11	4–0
- Date: 16 October 1981
- City: Ballinasloe
- Man of the Match: Brigid Sheridan (Cavan)
- Referee: M Fitzgerald (Kerry)
- Weather: Sunny

The 1981 All-Ireland Senior Ladies' Football Championship final was the eighth All-Ireland Final and the deciding match of the 1981 All-Ireland Senior Ladies' Football Championship, an inter-county ladies' Gaelic football tournament for the top teams in Ireland.

Offaly were hot favourites but trailed 3–0 to 0–6 at half-time. Cavan ran out of steam in the second half and Offaly won by two.
