= 1993 All-Ireland Senior Ladies' Football Championship final =

1993 All-Ireland Senior Ladies' Football Final
- Event: 1993 All-Ireland Senior Ladies' Football Championship
Kerry	Laois
4–8	2–6
- Date: 10 October 1993
- Venue: Croke Park, Dublin

The 1993 All-Ireland Senior Ladies' Football Championship final was the twentieth All-Ireland Final and the deciding match of the 1993 All-Ireland Senior Ladies' Football Championship, an inter-county ladies' Gaelic football tournament for the top teams in Ireland.

An inexperienced Laois team lost a fourth final in a row as Kerry won by eight points.
