= 1975 All-Ireland Senior Ladies' Football Championship final =

1975 All-Ireland Senior Ladies' Football Final
- Event: 1975 All-Ireland Senior Ladies' Football Championship
Tipperary	Galway
1–4	0–0
- Date: 13 October 1975
- Venue: Geraldine Park, Athy
- Referee: Mary Corooran
- Attendance: 700

The 1975 All-Ireland Senior Ladies' Football Championship final was the second All-Ireland Final and the deciding match of the 1975 All-Ireland Senior Ladies' Football Championship, an inter-county ladies' Gaelic football tournament for the top teams in Ireland.

Tipperary retained the title with an easy win.
