= All-Ireland Intermediate Ladies' Football Championship =

Gaelic football championship

- Founded: 1997; 29 years ago
- Title holders: Roscommon (2nd title)
- Most titles: Tipperary (3 titles)
- Sponsors: TG4

The All-Ireland Intermediate Ladies' Football Championship is a knock-out competition in the game of Ladies' Gaelic football played by women in Ireland. The series of games are organised by Ladies' Gaelic Football Association (Irish :Cumann Peil Gael na mBan)) and are played during the summer months with the All-Ireland Final being played on the last Sunday in September or the first Sunday in October in Croke Park, Dublin.

The winners of the competition are presented with the Mary Quinn Memorial Cup.

The All-Ireland Intermediate Championship was preceded by the All-Ireland Senior B Championship. However, both are different competitions. The All-Ireland Intermediate Championship commenced in 1997, however this was not renamed from the All-Ireland Senior B Championship, but was instead a new and different competition. The All-Ireland Senior B Championship was for counties who had a second county team or counties who did not play Senior Championship competition. (Source: LGFA Operations Co-Ordinator, June 2023)

== Teams ==
=== 2026 teams ===
County	Province	In championship since	Championship titles	Last championship title
Cavan	Ulster	2024	1	2013
Clare	Munster	2015	1	2009
Down	Ulster	2024	1	2014
Fermanagh	Ulster	2025	0	—
Laois	Leinster	2025	2	2022
Leitrim	Connacht	2026	2	2024
Louth	Leinster	2026	0	
Monaghan	Ulster	2023	0	—
Roscommon	Connacht		1	2005
Westmeath	Leinster	2023	2	2021
Wexford	Leinster	2015	0	—
Wicklow	Leinster	2022	0	—

== Roll of honour ==
=== By county ===
County	Wins	Runners-Up	Years won	Years runners-up
Tipperary	3	1	2008, 2017, 2019	2013
Laois	2	2	2000, 2022	1998, 2025
Tyrone	2	2	2018, 2025	2017, 2024
Westmeath	2	1	2011, 2021	2020
Kildare	2	1	2016, 2023	2015
Leitrim	2	0	2007, 2024	
Roscommon	2	0	2005, 2026	
Clare	1	3	2009	2008, 2016, 2023
Waterford	1	2	2015	2010, 2012
Meath	1	2	2020	2018, 2019
Cork	1	1	1998	2000
Cavan	1	1	2013	2011
Down	1	1	2014	2005
Donegal	1	0	2010	
Armagh	1	0	2012	
Wexford	0	3		1999, 2021, 2022
Fermanagh	0	3		2009, 2014, 2026

== List of finals ==
=== List of All-Ireland intermediate finals ===
Year	Winners		Runners-up	
Year	County	Score	County	Score
1997	Kerry	6–15	Dublin	1-07
1998	Cork	4–14	Laois	3–07
1999	Louth	2–08	Wexford	1–07
2000	Laois	3–14	Cork	1–13
2001	No Championship			
2002	No Championship			
2003	No Championship			
2004	No Championship			
2005	Roscommon	1–12	Down	1–05
2006	No Championship			
2007	Leitrim	0–17	Wexford	1–10
2008	Tipperary	0–14	Clare	1–08
2009	Clare	3–10	Fermanagh	1–11
2010	Donegal	2–12	Waterford	0–16
2011	Westmeath	0–11, 1–09 (R)	Cavan	2–05, 1–08 (R)
2012	Armagh	1–12	Waterford	1–05
2013	Cavan	1–14	Tipperary	1–12
2014	Down	6–16	Fermanagh	1–10
2015	Waterford	3–14	Kildare	0–10
2016	Kildare	1–13	Clare	1–12
2017	Tipperary	1–13	Tyrone	1–10
2018	Tyrone	6–08	Meath	1–14
2019	Tipperary	2–16	Meath	1–14
2020	Meath	2–17	Westmeath	4–05
2021	Westmeath	4–19	Wexford	0–06
2022	Laois	1–13	Wexford	1–11
2023	Kildare	2–11	Clare	2–10
2024	Leitrim	3–11	Tyrone	3–10
2025	Tyrone	2–16	Laois	1–13
2026	Roscommon	2–12	Fermanagh	0–06

=== 2017 final ===
24 September 2017; 1:45 pm Final	Tipperary	1-13 - 1-10	Tyrone	Croke Park, Dublin; Referee: Garryowen McMahon (Mayo); Man of the Match: Aisling McCarthy (Cahir)
24 September 2017; 1:45 pm Final	Aisling McCarthy 1-4 (0-4f), Gillian O'Brien 0-4, Mairead Morrissry and Roisin Howard 0-2 each, Aishling Moloney 0-1	Report	Gemma Begley 0-4 (0-3f), Grainne Rafferty 1-0, Emma Jane Gervin and Maria Canavan (0-2f), Niamh O'Neill and Chloe McCaffrey 0-1 each	Croke Park, Dublin; Referee: Garryowen McMahon (Mayo); Man of the Match: Aisling McCarthy (Cahir)

=== 2019 final ===
15 September 2019; 1:45 pm Final	Tipperary	2-16 - 1-14	Meath	Croke Park, Dublin; Referee: Jonathan Murphy (Carlow).
15 September 2019; 1:45 pm Final	A Moloney 0-8 (1f), A McCarthy 1-2, A McGuigan 1-1, O O’Dwyer 0-2, C Condon 0-1, C Kennedy 0-1, A Fennessey 0-1.	Report	E Duggan 0-5 (3f), V Wall 0-4, F O’Neill 1-1, A Cleary 0-1, K Nesbitt 0-1, B Lynch 0-1, S Grimes 0-1 (1f)	Croke Park, Dublin; Referee: Jonathan Murphy (Carlow).

=== 2024 final ===
4 August 2024; 1:45 pm Final	Leitrim	3-11 - 3-10	Tyrone	Croke Park, Dublin; Referee: Barry Redmond (Wexford).
4 August 2024; 1:45 pm Final	Ailbhe Clancy 2-3, Michelle Guckian 0-5, Laura O'Dowd 1-2, Muireann Devaney 0-1.	Report	Aoife Horisk 2-2, Chlor McCaffrey 0-4, Aoibhinn McHugh 1-0, Maria Canavan 0-1, Emma Conroy 0-1, E McNamee 0-1, Sorcha Gormley 0-1.	Croke Park, Dublin; Referee: Barry Redmond (Wexford).

== See also ==
- All-Ireland Senior Ladies' Football Championship (Tier 1)
- All-Ireland Junior Ladies' Football Championship (Tier 3)

== Outside Sources ==
- LGFA Official Roll of Honour (IFC)
