= Ladies' Gaelic Football Association =

Governing body for ladies' Gaelic football

Ladies' Gaelic Football Association Cumann Peil Gael na mBan
- Formation: 18 July 1974
- Headquarters: Croke Park, Dublin
- Region served: Ireland; United Kingdom; International
- President: Trina Murray
- Website: ladiesgaelic.ie

The Ladies' Gaelic Football Association (Irish: Cumann Peil Gael na mBan) is the main governing body for ladies' Gaelic football. It organises competitions such as the All-Ireland Senior Ladies' Football Championship and the Ladies' National Football League.

== Foundation ==
The Ladies' Gaelic Football Association was founded on 18 July 1974 at a meeting held at the Hayes' Hotel in Thurles, County Tipperary, almost ninety years after the Gaelic Athletic Association was founded at the same hotel. Representatives from four counties – Offaly, Kerry, Tipperary and Galway – attended the meeting. In the same year the LGFA also organised the inaugural All-Ireland Senior Ladies' Football Championship. The LGFA was recognised by the Gaelic Athletic Association in 1982.

== Competitions ==
=== All-Irelands ===
- All-Ireland Senior Ladies' Football Championship
- All-Ireland Intermediate Ladies' Football Championship
- All-Ireland Junior Ladies' Football Championship
- All-Ireland Under-18 Ladies' Football Championship
- All-Ireland Under-16 Ladies' Football Championship
- All-Ireland Under-14 Ladies' Football Championship
- All-Ireland Ladies' Club Football Championship

=== Leagues ===
- Ladies' National Football League

=== Intervarsity ===
- O'Connor Cup

== Representative team ==
- Ireland women's international rules football team
