= 2020 All-Ireland Junior Ladies' Football Championship =

Tournament details
- Level: Junior
- Year: 2020
- Trophy: West County Hotel Cup
- Sponsor: TG4, Lidl, AIG
- Date: 25 October – 5 December
- Teams: 6

Winners
- Champions: Fermanagh LGFA (2nd win)
- Manager: Johnny Garrity
- Captain: Courteney Murphy
- Qualify for: Intermediate Ladies' Football Championship

Runners-up
- Runners-up: Wicklow LGFA
- Manager: Mark Murnaghan
- Captain: Laura Hogan

Other
- Matches played: 9
- Total scored: 41 goals (4.56 gpg) 152 points (16.89 ppg)
- Player of the Year: Eimear Smyth (Fermanagh)
- Top Scorer: Eimear Smyth (6,18) 36 points
- Website: https://ladiesgaelic.ie/

The 2020 All-Ireland Junior Ladies' Football Championship was the 38th contested edition of the Ladies' Gaelic Football Association's tertiary inter-county Ladies' Gaelic football tournament.

The impact of the COVID-19 pandemic on Gaelic games forced the delay of the tournament until late in the year.

Fermanagh LGFA were the winners for the second time in their history and will play in the All-Ireland Intermediate Ladies' Football Championship in 2021.

== Format ==
=== Group stage ===
6 counties competed in the 2020 tournament. There were two groups of three. Each team played the other team's in their group once, earning three points for a win and one for a draw.

=== Knockout stage ===
The winner of group A competed in the All-Ireland semi-final against the runner up of group B, and the winner of group B played the runner up of group A.

== Teams ==
Counties	Flag colours	Captain (2020)	Manager (2020)	Junior Championships	Last Win
Antrim LGFA		Áine Tubridy	Damien McConville	2	2012
Carlow LGFA		Anne Roche	Mark Keating	—	—
Derry LGFA		Grace Conway	Paul Hasson	—	—
Fermanagh LGFA		Courteney Murphy	Johnny Garrity	2	2020
Limerick LGFA		Niamh McCarthy	Donal Ryan	2	2018
Wicklow LGFA		Laura Hogan	Mark Murnaghan	2	2011

== Venues ==
Match Locations
Venues used for the 2020 All-Ireland Junior Ladies' Football Championship.

== Fixtures and results ==
Key to colours
Advance to All-Ireland semi-finals

=== Group A Table ===
Team	Pld	W	D	L	Group Points	Score Difference
Wicklow	2	2	0	0	6	+17
Fermanagh	2	1	0	1	3	–2
Carlow	2	0	0	2	0	–15

==== Group A results ====
25 October
14:00 GMT
Group A Rd 1

Wicklow	3–15 (24) – 2–05 (11)	Carlow
(HT: 2–10 – 1–01)
Gls: M Deeney 2, S Miley 1 Pts: M Deeney 6, M Kealy 4, L Hogan 3, L Ahern 1, C Fox 1		Gls: C Ní Shé 1, S Doyle 1 Pts: C Ní Shé 2, S Doyle 1, A Gilmartin 1, E Atkinson 1

Baltinglass, Wicklow
Referee: Lorraine O'Sullivan (Dublin)
Attendance: 0

31 October
13:00 GMT
Group A Rd 2

Fermanagh	1–02 (5) – 0–09 (9)	Wicklow
(HT: 1–01 – 0–06)
Gls: E Smyth 1 Pts: E Smyth 1, B Bogue 1		Pts: M Deeney 0–4, M Kealy 3, Hogan 2

Lannleire GFC, Louth
Referee: Gavin Finnegan (Down)
Attendance: 0

8 November
13:00 GMT
Group A Rd 3

Carlow	2–10 (16) – 3–09 (18)	Fermanagh
(HT: 2–05 – 1–04)
Gls: C Ní Shé 1, R Sawyer 1 Pts: C Ní Shé 7, R Sawyer 3		Gls: E Smyth 2, B Bogue 1 Pts: E Smyth 6, B Bogue 2, J Doonan 1

Lannleire GFC, Louth
Referee: Kieran Mc Keever (Armagh)
Attendance: 0

=== Group B Table ===
Team	Pld	W	D	L	Group Points	Score Difference
Limerick	2	2	0	0	6	+21
Antrim	2	1	0	1	3	+1
Derry	2	0	0	2	0	–22

==== Group B results ====
25 October
14:00 GMT
Group B Rd 1

Limerick	4–10 (22) – 0–07 (7)	Derry
(HT: 1–07 – 0–03)
Gls: C Mee 2, A Corbett 1, A Ryan 1 Pts: C Mee 3, A Ryan 1, R Ambrose 2, A Cunningham 2, A O'Sullivan 1, N McCarthy 1		Pts: E Doherty 0–6, E Sainsbury 0–1

Lannleire GFC, Louth
Referee: Ciaran Groome (Offaly)
Attendance: 0

1 November
13:00 GMT
Group B Rd 2

Antrim	1–05 (8) – 2–08 (14)	Limerick
(HT: 1–02 – 1–04)
Gls: M McCurdy 1 Pts: G McLoughlin 2, A Taggart 2, C Taggart 1		Gls: C Mee 1, A Ryan 1 Pts: C Mee 4, A Ryan 1, L Coughlan 1, A O'Sullivan 1, R Ambrose 1

Conneff Park, Clane, Kildare
Referee: Austin O'Connell (Galway)
Attendance: 0

8 November
13:00 GMT
Group B Rd 3

Derry	1–07 (10) – 2–11 (17)	Antrim
(HT: 1–04 – 1–06)
Gls: C McGurk 1 Pts: C McGurk 1, E Doherty 4, K Holly 1, C Moore 1		Gls: C Carey 1, M McCurdy 1 Pts: C Carey 3, M McCurdy 1, A Taggart 4, F Rocks 1, D Connolly 1, G McLoughlin 1

Augher, Tyrone
Referee: Siobhan Coyle (Donegal)
Attendance: 0

== All-Ireland Semi-finals ==
22 November
13:00 GMT
Semi-final 1

Report

Antrim	3–10 (19) – 7–11 (32)	Wicklow
(HT: 0–05 – 4–04)
Gls: B Devlin 1, C Carey 1, A Taggart 1 Pts: C Carey 4, A Taggart 1, M McCurdy 1, L Dahunsi 3, G McLoughlin 1		Gls: M Deeney 2, C Fox 3, M Kealy 1, L Hogan 1 Pts: M Deeney 1, M Kealy 5, L Hogan 2, S Miley 2

Donaghmore Ashbourne, Meath
Referee: Lorraine O'Sullivan (Dublin)
Attendance: 0

22 November
13:00 GMT
Semi-final 2

Report

Fermanagh	4–10 (22) – 4–03 (15)	Limerick
(HT: 4–05 – 1–02)
Gls: E Smyth 2, J Doonan 1, R O'Reilly 1 Pts: E Smyth 6, J Doonan 2, R O'Reilly 1, S McCausland 1		Gls: A Ryan 2, A Cunningham 1, A O'Sullivan 1 Pts: A Cunningham 2 (2fs) A O'Sullivan 1

Kinnegad, Westmeath
Referee: Kevin Corcoran (Mayo)
Attendance: 0

== All-Ireland final ==
5 December
16:00 GMT
Final

Report

Fermanagh	2–09 (15) – 0–12 (12)	Wicklow
(HT: 1–07 – 0–06)
Gls: E Smyth 1, R McDonald 1 Pts: E Smyth 5 (4f), J Doonan 2, S McCausland 1, A Flanagan 1		Pts: M Kealy 7 (4f), L Hogan 3, M Deeney 2 (2f)

Parnell Park, Dublin
Referee: Siobhan Coyle (Donegal)
Attendance: 0

== Awards ==
=== TG4 Junior Players' Player of the Year ===
Eimear Smyth Fermanagh

=== Junior Team of the Championship ===
No.	Position	Player	Team	Flag
1	Goalkeeper	Shauna Murphy		Fermanagh
2	Right corner back	Emily Mulhall		Wicklow
3	Full back	Sarah Jane Winders		Wicklow
4	Left corner back	Rebekah Daly		Limerick
5	Right half back	Alanna Conroy		Wicklow
6	Centre half back	Saoirse Tennyson		Antrim
7	Left half back	Sarah McCarville		Fermanagh
8	Midfield	Aoife Gorman		Wicklow
9	Midfield	Róisín O'Reilly		Fermanagh
10	Right half forward	Áine Cunningham		Limerick
11	Centre half forward	Laura Hogan		Wicklow
12	Left half forward	Aishling Maguire		Fermanagh
13	Right corner forward	Eimear Smyth		Fermanagh
14	Full forward	Meadhbh Deeney		Wicklow
15	Left corner forward	Marie Kealy		Wicklow

== Season Statistics ==
Scoring list
No.	Name	Team	Flag	Goals	Points	Total points
1	Eimear Smyth		Fermanagh	6	18	36
2	Meadhbh Deeney		Wicklow	4	13	25
3	Marie Kealy		Wicklow	1	19	22
4	Cathy Mee		Limerick	3	7	16
5	Clíodhna Ní Shé		Carlow	2	9	15
6	Amy Ryan		Limerick	4	2	14
7	Laura Hogan		Wicklow	1	10	13
	Cathy Carey		Antrim	2	7	13
8	Clodagh Fox		Wicklow	3	1	10
	Aoife Taggart		Antrim	1	7	10
	Emma Doherty		Derry	0	10	10
9	Joanne Doogan		Fermanagh	1	5	8
	Meabh McCurdy		Antrim	2	2	8
10	Aine Cunningham		Limerick	1	4	7
11	Blaithin Bogue		Fermanagh	1	3	6
	Rachel Sawyer		Carlow	1	3	6
	Andrea O'Sullivan		Limerick	1	3	6
12	Sara Doyle		Carlow	1	1	4
	Grainne McLoughlin		Antrim	0	4	4
	Roisin O'Reilly		Fermanagh	1	1	4
	Ciara McGurk		Derry	1	1	4
13	Bronagh Devlin		Antrim	1	0	3
	Róisín McDonald		Fermanagh	1	0	3
	Róisín Ambrose		Limerick	0	3	3
	Lara Dahunsi		Antrim	0	3	3
	Aoife Corbett		Limerick	1	0	3
14	Sarah McCausland		Fermanagh	0	2	2
15	Ellen Atkinson		Carlow	0	1	1
	Aoibhinn Gilmartin		Carlow	0	1	1
	Danielle Connolly		Antrim	0	1	1
	Ciara Moore		Derry	0	1	1
	Aoife Flanagan		Fermanagh	0	1	1
	Ellen Atkinson		Carlow	0	1	1
	Niamh McCarthy		Limerick	0	1	1
	Fionnuala Rocks		Antrim	0	1	1
	Ella Siansbury		Derry	0	1	1
	Caitlin Taggart		Antrim	0	1	1
	Katy Holly		Derry	0	1	1
	Leah Coughlan		Limerick	0	1	1

Season Statistics Breakdown
Teams	Total score	Games	Points per game average	Goals	Points	First half (total score)	Average points (first half)	Second half (total score)	Average points (second half)	Clean sheets (goals)	No. of scoring players in season
Antrim	44	3	14.67	6	35	19	6.33	9	3	0	9
Carlow	27	2	13.5	4	15	15	7.55	12	6	0	5
Derry	17	2	8.5	1	14	10	5	7	3.5	0	5
Fermanagh	60	4	15	10	30	42	10.5	18	4.5	2	7
Limerick	51	3	17	10	21	22	7.33	29	9.67	1	8
Wicklow	77	4	16.25	10	47	44	11	33	8.25	0	6

== See also ==
- 2020 All-Ireland Senior Ladies' Football Championship
- 2020 All-Ireland Intermediate Ladies' Football Championship
- All-Ireland Junior Ladies' Football Championship
