= 2023 All-Ireland Senior Ladies' Football Championship =

Gaelic football competition

All-Ireland Senior Ladies' Football Championship 2023
Championship details
- Dates: 7 May – 13 August 2023
- Teams: 12

All-Ireland champions
- Winners: Dublin (6th win)
- Captain: Carla Rowe
- Manager: Mick Bohan

All Ireland Runners-up
- Runners-up: Kerry
- Captain: Síofra O'Shea
- Manager: Declan Quill and Darragh Long

Provincial champions
- Connacht: Mayo
- Leinster: Dublin
- Munster: Cork
- Ulster: Donegal

Championship Statistics
- Matches Played: 34

The 2023 All-Ireland Senior Ladies' Football Championship was the 50th edition of the Ladies' Gaelic Football Association's premier inter-county ladies' Gaelic football tournament, taking place in summer 2023 in Ireland. Holders Meath were aiming for a three-in-a-row, but were defeated by Kerry, who went on to lose the final to Dublin.

== Format ==
=== Provincial championships ===
The 12 teams first play in their provincial championships; in Connacht there are two teams and the championship is played as a single match.

In Leinster and Ulster there are three teams in the provincial championship. They play each other in a round-robin phase, with two teams progressing to the final.

In Munster there are four teams in the provincial championship. They play each other in a round-robin phase, with two teams progressing to the final.

=== Group stage ===
The 12 teams are drawn into four groups of three teams; seeding is based on performance in the provincial championships. Each team plays each other team in its group once, earning three points for a win and one for a draw.

=== Relegation ===
The last-placed teams in the groups play off to decide which team is relegated to the All-Ireland Intermediate Ladies' Football Championship.

=== Knockout stage ===
The top two in each group progress to the All-Ireland quarter-finals. Quarter-finals and semi-finals are "results on the day," with 20 minutes' extra time being played in the event of a draw, and a free-kick shootout being taken from a 30 m (33 yd) distance in the event of a draw after extra time. If the All-Ireland final is a draw, the game is replayed.

=== Tiebreakers for group ranking ===
If two teams are level on points, the tie-break is:

- winners of the head-to-head game are ranked ahead
- if the head-to-head match was a draw, then whichever team scored more points in the game is ranked ahead (e.g. 1-15 beats 2–12)
- if the head-to-head match was an exact draw, ranking is determined by the points difference (i.e. total scored minus total conceded in all games)
- if the points difference is equal, ranking is determined by the total scored

If three teams are level on league points, rankings are determined solely by points difference.

== Provincial championships ==
=== Connacht Senior Ladies' Football Championship ===
Final

7 May 2023
Final

Report

Galway	2-09 (15) – (22) 3-13	Mayo
(HT: 1-08 – 1-07)

MacHale Park, Castlebar
Referee: John Niland (Sligo)

=== Leinster Senior Ladies' Football Championship ===
Group Stage

Pos	Team	Pld	W	D	L	PF	PA	PD	Pts	Qualification
1	Dublin	2	2	0	0	32	10	+22	6	Advance to Leinster final
2	Meath	2	1	0	1	22	14	+8	3	Advance to Leinster final
3	Laois	2	0	0	2	8	38	−30	0	

Source: ladiesgaelic.ie
Rules for classification: Tiebreakers

Final

28 May 2023
Final

Dublin	2-09 (15) – 0-09 (9)	Meath
(HT: 1-02 - 0-05)

O'Moore Park, Portlaoise

=== Munster Senior Ladies' Football Championship ===
Group Stage

Pos	Team	Pld	W	D	L	PF	PA	PD	Pts	Qualification
1	Cork	3	2	1	0	56	41	+15	7	Advance to Munster final
2	Kerry	3	2	1	0	47	36	+11	7	Advance to Munster final
3	Waterford	3	1	0	2	24	40	−16	3	
4	Tipperary	3	0	0	3	35	45	−10	0	

Source: independent.ie
Rules for classification: Tiebreakers

Final

28 May 2023
Final

Cork	5-14 (29) – 2-17 (23)	Kerry
(HT: 4-10 - 0-07)

Mallow GAA Sports Complex, Mallow

=== Ulster Senior Ladies' Football Championship ===
Group Stage

Pos	Team	Pld	W	D	L	PF	PA	PD	Pts	Qualification
1	Armagh	2	2	0	0	46	23	+23	6	Advance to Ulster final
2	Donegal	2	1	0	1	19	22	−3	3	Advance to Ulster final
3	Cavan	2	0	0	2	27	47	−20	0	

Source: ulsterladiesgaelic.com
Rules for classification: Tiebreakers

Final

28 May 2023
Final

Armagh	0-09 (9) – 1-10 (13)	Donegal
(HT: 0-05 - 0-07)

St. Tiernach's Park, Clones

== All-Ireland group stage ==
Group games take place 17 June – 1 July, 2023.

=== Group A ===
Pos	Team	Pld	W	D	L	PF	PA	PD	Pts	Qualification
1	Armagh	2	2	0	0	37	28	+9	6	Advance to quarter-finals
2	Mayo	2	1	0	1	35	24	+11	3	Advance to quarter-finals
3	Laois	2	0	0	2	22	42	−20	0	Advance to relegation playoffs

Updated to match(es) played on 1 July 2023. Source: ladiesgaelic.ie
Rules for classification: Tiebreakers

=== Group B ===
Pos	Team	Pld	W	D	L	PF	PA	PD	Pts	Qualification
1	Donegal	2	2	0	0	29	23	+6	6	Advance to quarter-finals
2	Meath	2	1	0	1	28	24	+4	3	Advance to quarter-finals
3	Waterford	2	0	0	2	22	32	−10	0	Advance to relegation playoffs

Updated to match(es) played on 1 July 2023. Source: ladiesgaelic.ie
Rules for classification: Tiebreakers

=== Group C ===
Pos	Team	Pld	W	D	L	PF	PA	PD	Pts	Qualification
1	Kerry	2	2	0	0	41	23	+18	6	Advance to quarter-finals
2	Dublin	2	1	0	1	42	25	+17	3	Advance to quarter-finals
3	Cavan (R)	2	0	0	2	22	57	−35	0	Advance to relegation playoffs

Updated to match(es) played on 1 July 2023. Source: ladiesgaelic.ie
Rules for classification: Tiebreakers
(R) Relegated to All-Ireland Intermediate Ladies' Football Championship

=== Group D ===
Pos	Team	Pld	W	D	L	PF	PA	PD	Pts	Qualification
1	Galway	2	2	0	0	42	27	+15	6	Advance to quarter-finals
2	Cork	2	1	0	1	50	29	+21	3	Advance to quarter-finals
3	Tipperary	2	0	0	2	22	58	−36	0	Advance to relegation playoffs

Updated to match(es) played on 1 July 2023. Source: ladiesgaelic.ie
Rules for classification: Tiebreakers

== Relegation playoffs ==
15 July 2023
14:00 IST (UTC+1)
Relegation semi-final

Report

Laois	0-10 (10) – (8) 1-05	Cavan
(HT: 0-04 – 0-03)
Pts: M Nerney 6 (4fs), E Galvin 1, SA Fitzgerald 1f, G Moran 1f, O Hennessy 1		Gls: E Madden 1 Pts: A Gilsenan 4fs, M Cusack 1

St. Brigid's, Kiltoom
Referee: Eddie Cuthbert (Down)

15 July 2023
14:00 IST (UTC+1)
Relegation semi-final

Report

Waterford	0-08 (8) – (8) 0-08 (a.e.t.) (5–6 fk)	Tipperary
(HT: 0-04 – 0-00) (FT: 0-05 – 0-05)
Pts: K Hogan 4 (2fs), L McGregor 3fs, K Murray 1		Pts: A Moloney 4 (3fs), E Kelly 1, L Dillon 1, A McGuigan 1, L Morrissey 1

Piltown GAA Complex, Piltown
Referee: P Burke (Louth)

22 July 2023
14:00 IST (UTC+1)
Relegation final

Report

Waterford	1-19 (22) – (8) 0-08	Cavan
(HT: 1-08 – 0-03)
Gls: S Hallinan 1 Pts: K Hogan 6, L McGregor 4 (2fs), B McMaugh 3, K Murray 1, A Murray 1, K McGrath 1, C Hynes 1, E Murray 1, S Hallinan 1		Pts: C McCaffrey 4fs, A Sheridan 1, A Gilsenan 1, A Smith 1, A Deneher 1

Crettyard GAA, Crettyard
Referee: David Hurson (Monaghan)

Cavan are relegated to the All-Ireland Intermediate Ladies' Football Championship for 2024.

== All-Ireland knockout stage ==
=== All-Ireland quarter-finals ===
TG4

15 July 2023
13:30 IST (UTC+1)
Quarter-Final 1

Report

Galway	1-06 (9) – (10) 0-10	Mayo
(HT: 1-02 – 0-06)
Gls: L Noone 1 Pts: R Leonard 3f, T Leonard 2 (1f), A Molloy 1		Pts: D Doherty 3f, S Howley 3 (2f), S Cafferky 1, C Needham 1, T Needham 1, M Cannon 1f

Pearse Stadium, Salthill
Referee: Seamus Mulvihill (Kerry)

TG4

15 July 2023
15:30 IST (UTC+1)
Quarter-Final 2

Report

Armagh	2-05 (11) – (14) 0-14	Cork
(HT: 0-05 – 0-05)
Gls: B Mackin 1, N Coleman 1 Pts: K Mallon 2f, A McCoy 2, B Mackin 1		Pts: D O’Sullivan 4f, C O’Sullivan 3, K Quirke 2f, D Kiely 1, H Looney 1, A Healy 1

Athletic Grounds, Armagh
Referee: Maggie Farrelly

TG4

15 July 2023
19:30 IST (UTC+1)
Quarter-Final 3

Report

Kerry	2-08 (14) – (10) 0-10	Meath
(HT: 2-07 – 0-03)
Gls: S O’Shea 1, N Carmody 1 Pts: L Ní Mhuircheartaigh 3 (1f), N Ní Chonchúir 2, L Scanlon 1, H O’Donoghue1, S O’Shea 1		Pts: E Duggan 7 (5fs), V Wall 3

Austin Stack Park, Tralee
Referee: Shane Curley (Galway)

TG4

16 July 2023
14:00 IST (UTC+1)
Quarter-Final 4

Report

Donegal	0-06 (6) – (21) 3-12	Dublin
(HT: 0-03 – 1-06)

Parnell Park, Donnycarney
Referee: Garryowen McMahon

=== All-Ireland semi-finals ===
TG4

29 July 2023
17:00 IST (UTC+1)
Semi-Final

Report

Kerry	1-16 (19) – (14) 1-11	Mayo
(HT: 1-10 – 0-04)
Gls: L Ní Muircheartaigh 1 Pts: L Ní Muircheartaigh 10 (4fs), H O’Donoghue 3, E Costello 1, N Ní Conchúir 1, D O’Leary 1		Gls: D Doherty 1 Pts: S Howley 3 (2fs), S Cafferky 2, C Needham 2, S Walsh 1, L Cafferky 1, R Kearns 1, A Geraghty 1

Semple Stadium, Thurles
Referee: Maggie Farrelly (Cavan)

TG4

29 July 2023
19:30 IST (UTC+1)
Semi-Final

Report

Cork	0-13 (13) – (25) 2-19	Dublin
(HT: 0-07 – 1-10)
Pts: D O’Sullivan 8fs, C O’Sullivan 1, K Quirke 1, A Healy 1, D Kiely 1, O Cahalane 1		Gls: H Tyrrell 1, C Rowe 1 Pts: J Dunne 4, O Nolan 3, L Magee 2, H Tyrrell 2 (1f), C Rowe 2, O Gribben 2, K Sullivan 1, J Egan 1, S Aherne 1, N Donlon 1

Semple Stadium, Thurles
Referee: Jonathan Murphy (Carlow)

=== All-Ireland final ===
TG4

13 August 2023
16:00 IST (UTC+1)
All-Ireland Final

Report

Kerry	1-10 (13) – (18) 0-18	Dublin
(HT: 0-04 – 0-11)
Gls: Louise Ni Mhuircheartaigh 1 Pts: Louise Ni Mhuircheartaigh 7 (6f), Niamh Carmody 2, Aishling O'Connell 1		Pts: Hannah Tyrrell 8 (4f), Carla Rowe 4 (1f), Jennifer Dunne 2, Orlagh Nolan 1, Caoimhe O'Connor 1, Kate Sullivan 1, Niamh Hetherton 1

Croke Park, Dublin
Referee: Shane Curley (Galway)
Attendance: 45,326

== Protest ==
The start of the group stage match between Mayo and Laois was delayed due to a protest by the players of both teams. Both teams wore t-shirts that said #UNITEDFOREQUALITY during the warm up and went back to the dressing room for approximately 5 minutes after the national anthem was played. The protest was about delays from the LFGA, Camogie Association and GAA to develop a charter for inter-county players. Other teams that played on July 1 also wore the same t-shirts.

== See also ==
- 2023 All-Ireland Intermediate Ladies' Football Championship
- 2023 All-Ireland Junior Ladies' Football Championship
- 2023 Ladies' National Football League
