= Antrim Ladies Gaelic Football Association =

Governing body of Gaelic games

Antrim LGFA
- Irish: Aontroim
- Nickname(s): The Saffs
- Founded: 1996
- Province: Ulster
- Ground(s): Various
- County colours: Saffron White
- Website: www.antrimlgfa.ie

Executive
- Chairman: Ursula Lynch
- Secretary: Ashlene McLarnon
- Treasurer: Anthony Carleton

The Antrim County Board of the Ladies Gaelic Football Association (Irish: Cumann Pheil na mBan Aontroim) or Antrim LGFA is one of the 32 county boards of the LGFA in Ireland, and is responsible for Ladies' Gaelic Football in County Antrim. The county board is also responsible for the Antrim county teams.

As of 2024, there were 35 clubs affiliated to Antrim LGFA.

== History ==
The Ladies Gaelic Football Association was established in July 1974 in Hayes Hotel, Thurles, County Tipperary – the same venue in which the GAA had been established 80 years previously. Antrim was one of the last counties in Ireland to organise formally, not doing so until 1995.

A group of students in Belfast came together and organised teams in their own parishes, playing first a number of challenge games and then organising league and championships.

The first Antrim LGFA Junior Championship and League was won in 1996 by Conn Magee's Glenravel.

== Inter-county team ==
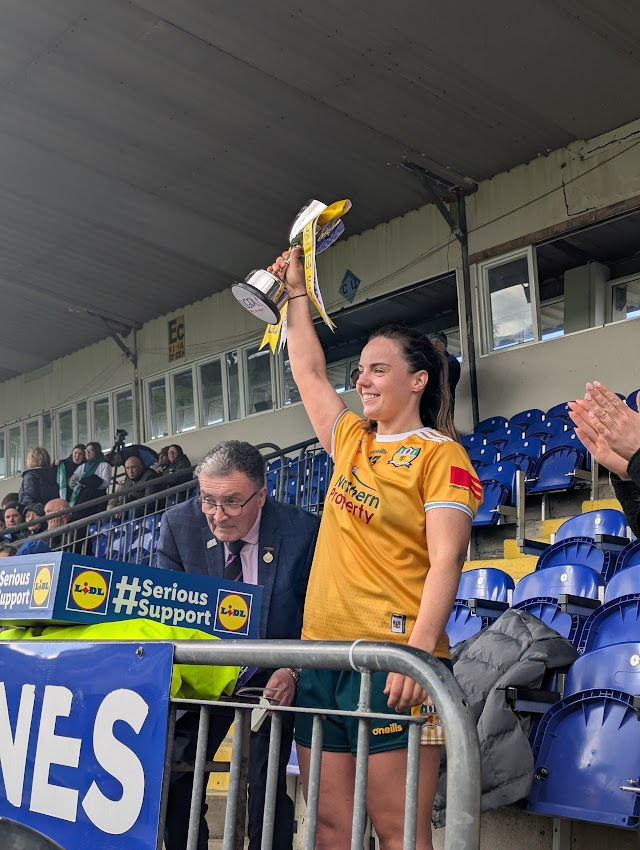
Antrim captain Bronagh Devlin lifts the Division 4 trophy following her side's win over Fermanagh in the league final on 13 April 2025

Antrim won their first All-Ireland Junior Title in 2009 with a 3–10 to 2–08 victory over Limerick in the final in Croke Park.

They followed this up with another Junior Title in 2012, this time beating Louth by 3–09 to 0-07.

A decade passed before their third title at the junior grade in 2022, this time won at Armagh's Athletic Grounds in a replay against Fermanagh by a scoreline of 3–15 to 0–11, following a drawn game at Croke Park two weeks previously which finished 1–13 to 1–13.

In 2023, Antrim won Division Four of the National League for the first time beating Limerick in the League Final at Parnell Park.

The county also won the Ulster Intermediate Championship for the first time beating holders Tyrone by 2–18 to 1–13 at Owenbeg, before being eliminated by Clare at the All-Ireland Semi-Final stage.

In 2024 they were relegated from both the intermediate championship and Division Three of the National League and will play in 2025 in the Junior Championship.

Antrim finished the 2025 National League season unbeaten, securing the league title with a two-point win over Fermanagh at St Tiernach's Park on 13 April.

== Clubs ==
Antrim LGFA has 35 affiliated clubs. The most successful club is St Paul's GAC, Belfast who won the Antrim Senior Football Championship nine years in a row between 2012 and 2020.

St Ergnat's, Moneyglass have been the dominant club in recent years have won the senior championship each year since 2021, most recently defeating St Brigid's, Belfast in the final in October 2024.
