= All-Ireland Junior Ladies' Football Championship =

Gaelic football championship

- Irish: Craobh Shóisir Peile na mBan na hÉireann
- Founded: 1985
- Trophy: West County Hotel Cup
- Title holders: Antrim (4th title)
- Most titles: Louth, Antrim (4 titles)
- Sponsors: TG4

The All-Ireland Junior Ladies' Football Championship is the third tier championship competition in the game of Ladies' Gaelic football played by women in Ireland. The series of games are organised by Ladies' Gaelic Football Association (Irish :Cumann Peil Gael na mBan) and are played during the early summer months with the All-Ireland Final being played in late July or early August. The winners of the competition are presented with the West County Hotel Cup.

== Competition format ==
Counties are divided into two groups and participate in a round robin series of games. The top two teams play in a knockout semi-final before the winners of each game proceed to the final.

The winners of the competition are promoted to the Intermediate Championship in the next season and are replaced by a team relegated from that tier. Unlike the men's Championship, the counties' Ladies' National Football League does not have any bearing in which championship tier they compete.

== List of finals ==
The current holders are Antrim who won their fourth title after beating Carlow in the 2026 decider. They will compete in the Intermediate Championship in 2027.

=== List of All-Ireland Junior finals ===
Year	Winners		Runners-up	
Year	County	Score	County	Score
2026	Antrim	1-13	Carlow	2-09
2025	Louth	0–13	Antrim	1–08
2024	Fermanagh	1-11	Louth	0-12
2023	Down	1-08	Limerick	0-07
2022	Antrim	1-13, 3-15 (R)	Fermanagh	1-13, 0-11 (R)
2021	Wicklow	2-17	Antrim	1-09
2020	Fermanagh	2-09	Wicklow	0-12
2019	Louth	3-13	Fermanagh	2-06
2018	Limerick	5-06	Louth	0-08
2017	Fermanagh	3-07, 2-09 (R)	Derry	2-10, 0-11 (R)
2016	Longford	4-10	Antrim	1-12
2015	Louth	4-12	Scotland	0-02
2014	Wexford	1-12	New York	1-10
2013	Offaly	2-11	Wexford	0-12
2012	Antrim	3-09	Louth	0-07
2011^{[a]}	Wicklow	0-09, 2-10 (R)	New York	0-09, 0-08 (R)
2010	Limerick	4-10	Louth	3-08
2009	Antrim	3-10	Limerick	2-08
2008	London	5-05	Derry	1-11
2007	Kilkenny	3-05	London	2-05
2006	Sligo	0-08	Leitrim	0-04
2005	Armagh	0-12	Sligo	0-09
2004	Kildare	2-13	Sligo	3-05
2003	Donegal	3-14	Kildare	0-12
2002	Galway	2-17	Donegal	2-07
2001	Roscommon	1-17	Kildare	0-08
2000	Down	0-14	Galway	1-09
1999	Tyrone	4-12	New York	2-04
1998	Louth	4-08	Roscommon	2-09
1997	Longford	2-12	Tyrone	1-11
1996	Clare	5-09	Longford	4-09
1995	Cork	4-08	Tyrone	3-02
1994	Meath	5-13	Donegal	1-03
1993	London	4-08	Donegal	0-03
1992	Monaghan	2-08	London	2-06
1991	Clare	1-08	London	0-02
1990	Wicklow	3-03	London	2-01
1989	Dublin	1-08, 1-07 (R)	Clare	2-05, 1-02 (R)
1988	Leitrim	2-08	London	0-05
1987	Mayo	4-10	Wexford	4-07
1986	Waterford	4-13	Wexford	0-00
1985	Galway	5-07	Cork	0-03

=== Notes ===
- f^{a} (after a replay) - LGFA president Pat Quill promised to provide part of the money required for the New York team's third visit to Ireland that year after the final finished level

== Winners Table ==
=== By county ===
County	Wins	Runners-up	Years won	Years runners-up
Louth	4	4	1998, 2015, 2019, 2025	2010, 2012, 2018, 2024
Antrim	4	3	2009, 2012, 2022, 2026	2016, 2021, 2025
Fermanagh	3	2	2017, 2020, 2024	2019, 2022
Wicklow	3	1	1990, 2011, 2021	2020
London	2	5	1993, 2008	1988, 1990, 1991, 1992, 2007
Limerick	2	2	2010, 2018	2009, 2023
Galway	2	1	1985, 2002	2000
Clare	2	1	1991, 1996	1989
Longford	2	1	1997, 2016	1996
Down	2	0	2000, 2023	—
Donegal	1	3	2003	1993, 1994, 2002
Wexford	1	3	2014	1986, 1987, 2013
Tyrone	1	2	1999	1995, 1997
Kildare	1	2	2004	2001, 2003
Sligo	1	2	2006	2004, 2005
Leitrim	1	1	1988	2006
Cork	1	1	1995	1985
Roscommon	1	1	2001	1998
Waterford	1	0	1986	—
Mayo	1	0	1987	—
Dublin	1	0	1989	—
Monaghan	1	0	1992	—
Meath	1	0	1994	—
Armagh	1	0	2005	—
Kilkenny	1	0	2007	—
Offaly	1	0	2013	—
New York	0	3	—	1999, 2011, 2014
Derry	0	2	—	2008, 2017
Scotland	0	1	—	2015
Carlow	0	1	—	2026

=== By province ===
County	Wins	Runners-up	Total	Most recent win
Leinster	15	12	27	2025
Ulster	13	12	25	2026
Connacht	6	5	11	2006
Munster	6	4	10	2018
Britain	2	6	8	2008
North America	0	3	3	—

== See also ==
- All-Ireland Senior Ladies' Football Championship (Tier 1)
- All-Ireland Intermediate Ladies' Football Championship (Tier 2)

== Outside Sources ==
- Ladies Gaelic Roll of Honour
