= 2016 Ladies' National Football League =

League details
- Dates: 31 January – 7 May 2016
- Teams: 31

League champions
- Winners: Cork (10th win)
- Captain: Ciara O'Sullivan
- Manager: Ephie Fitzgerald

League runners-up
- Runners-up: Mayo
- Captain: Sarah Tierney
- Manager: Frank Browne

Other division winners
- Division 2: Donegal
- Division 3: Waterford
- Division 4: Limerick

The 2016 Ladies' National Football League, known for sponsorship reasons as the Lidl Ladies' National Football League, was a ladies' Gaelic football competition that ended on 7 May 2016. Cork were the Division 1 champions for the fourth year in a row.

== Format ==
=== League structure ===
The 2016 Ladies' National Football League consists of four divisions - three of eight teams and one of seven. Kilkenny do not compete. Each team plays every other team in its division once. 3 points are awarded for a win and 1 for a draw. 2 points are deducted for conceding a walkover.

If two teams are level on league points, the tie-break is -

- Winners of the head-to-head game are ranked ahead
- If the head-to-head match was a draw, ranking is determined by score difference (i.e. total scored minus total conceded in all games)
- If the teams are still level, ranking is determined by the total scored

If three or more teams are level on league points, rankings are determined solely by score difference.

=== Finals, promotions and relegations ===
The top four teams in Division 1 contest the Ladies' National Football League semi-finals (first plays fourth and second plays third).

The top four teams in divisions 2, 3 and 4 contest the semi-finals of their respective divisions. The division champions are promoted.

The bottom teams in divisions 1, 2 and 3 are relegated.

== Division 1 ==
=== Table ===
Team	Pld	W	D	L	F	A	Diff	Pts	Notes
Mayo	7	7	0	0	119	78	+41	21	Advance to Division 1 semi-finals
Cork (C)	7	4	0	3	147	89	+58	12	Advance to Division 1 semi-finals
Dublin	7	4	0	3	144	87	+57	12	Advance to Division 1 semi-finals
Kerry	7	4	0	3	125	95	+30	12	Advance to Division 1 semi-finals
Armagh	7	4	0	3	139	118	+21	12
Galway	7	4	0	3	135	121	+14	12
Monaghan	7	1	0	6	78	145	–67	3
Tyrone	7	0	0	7	32	186	–154	0	Relegated to Division 2 for 2017

Cork, Dublin, Kerry, Armagh and Galway are ranked by score difference.

=== Controversy ===
After the final round of the Division 1 league the Ladies' Gaelic Football Association mistakenly announced that Armagh were one of the teams qualified for the semi-finals. They subsequently corrected their error and apologised. Armagh issued a statement accusing the LGFA of "total incompetence" and revealed that they had considered legal action.

=== Semi-finals and final ===
23 April 2016; Semi-Final	Mayo	1-16 – 2-12	Kerry	St Brendan's Park, Birr

23 April 2016; Semi-Final	Cork	1-15 – 0-11	Dublin	St Brendan's Park, Birr

7 May 2016; 7:15 p.m. Final	Cork	1-10 – 0-10	Mayo	Parnell Park, Donnycarney; Referee: Brendan Rice
7 May 2016; 7:15 p.m. Final	O Finn (0-6); R Ní Bhuachalla (1-1); R Buckley (0-1); O Farmer (0-1); A Walsh (0-1)	Report	C Staunton (0-6); S Mulvihill (0-1); S Rowe (0-1); N Kelly (0-1); G Kelly (0-1)	Parnell Park, Donnycarney; Referee: Brendan Rice

== Division 2 ==
=== Table ===
Team	Pld	W	D	L	F	A	Diff	Pts	Notes
Donegal (P)	7	7	0	0	157	65	+92	21	Advance to Division 2 semi-finals Champions promoted
Westmeath	7	5	0	2	127	82	+45	15	Advance to Division 2 semi-finals Champions promoted
Clare	7	5	0	2	118	80	+38	15	Advance to Division 2 semi-finals Champions promoted
Cavan	7	5	0	2	115	81	+34	15	Advance to Division 2 semi-finals Champions promoted
Kildare	7	2	0	5	90	150	–60	6
Laois	7	2	0	5	77	118	–41	6
Sligo	7	1	0	6	82	137	–55	3
Meath	7	1	0	6	96	149	–53	3	Relegated to Division 3 for 2017

- Sligo defeated Meath in a playoff game.

=== Semi-finals and final ===
23 April 2016; Semi-Final	Donegal	0-13 – 0-6	Cavan	Beragh

23 April 2016; Semi-Final	Westmeath	4-12 – 1-11	Clare	Banagher

7 May 2016; 5:30 p.m. Final	Donegal	3-17 – 0-13	Westmeath	Parnell Park, Donnycarney; Referee: Keith Delahunty

== Division 3 ==
=== Table ===
Team	Pld	W	D	L	F	A	Diff	Pts	Notes
Waterford (P)	7	7	0	0	145	77	+68	21	Advance to Division 3 semi-finals Champions promoted
Tipperary	7	6	0	1	163	74	+89	18	Advance to Division 3 semi-finals Champions promoted
Wexford	7	4	0	3	111	86	+25	12	Advance to Division 3 semi-finals Champions promoted
Leitrim	7	4	0	3	135	111	+24	12	Advance to Division 3 semi-finals Champions promoted
Roscommon	7	4	0	3	110	100	+10	12
Offaly	7	2	0	5	91	136	–45	6
Down	7	1	0	6	96	141	–45	3
Fermanagh	7	0	0	7	36	162	–126	0	Relegated to Division 4 for 2017

- Wexford, Leitrim and Roscommon are ranked by score difference.

=== Semi-finals and final ===
17 April 2016; Semi-Final	Tipperary	5-11 – 4-7	Wexford	Piltown; Referee: Colm McManus

17 April 2016; Semi-Final	Waterford	7-15 – 0-6	Leitrim	Portarlington; Referee: Jonathan Murphy

30 April 2016; 3:45 p.m. Final	Waterford	2-13 – 3-10	Tipperary	Conneff Park, Clane; Referee: Gavin Corrigan

8 May 2016; 1:15 p.m. Final Replay	Waterford	1-13 – 1-12	Tipperary	Semple Stadium, Thurles; Referee: Jonathan Murphy

== Division 4 ==
=== Table ===
Team	Pld	W	D	L	F	A	Diff	Pts	Notes
Longford	6	5	0	1	150	73	+77	15	Advance to Division 4 semi-finals Champions promoted
Wicklow	6	5	0	1	168	44	+124	15	Advance to Division 4 semi-finals Champions promoted
Limerick (P)	6	4	0	2	167	44	+123	12	Advance to Division 4 semi-finals Champions promoted
Antrim	6	3	0	3	66	66	0	9	Advance to Division 4 semi-finals Champions promoted
Louth	6	3	0	3	121	91	+30	9
Derry	6	1	0	5	61	189	–128	3
Carlow	6	0	0	6	28	254	–226	0

- Antrim are ranked ahead of Louth as they won the head-to-head game between the teams

=== Semi-finals and final ===
17 April 2016; Semi-Final	Wicklow	2-6 – 0-14	Limerick	Stradbally

17 April 2016; Semi-Final	Longford	0-13 – 2-11	Antrim	O'Raghallaigh Park, Kingscourt

30 April 2016; 2 p.m. Final	Antrim	1-10 – 4-8	Limerick	Conneff Park, Clane; Referee: Des McEnery
30 April 2016; 2 p.m. Final	E Gallagher 1-3, C Timoney (1f) and A McParland 0-2 each, C Carey, Á Tubridy & M Cooper 0-1 each.	Report	D O’Brien 2-5 (0-3f), N Holland 2-0, N Richardson 0-2, S Carroll 0-1	Conneff Park, Clane; Referee: Des McEnery
