= 2023 Ladies' National Football League =

Planned ladies' Gaelic football competition, Ireland

League details
- Dates: 22 January – 16 April, 2023
- Teams: 33

League champions
- Winners: Kerry (12th win)
- Captain: Siofra O'Shea
- Manager: Darragh Long & Declan Quill

League runners-up
- Runners-up: Galway
- Captain: Lynsey McKey
- Manager: Fiona Wynne & Maghnus Breathnach

Other division winners
- Division 2: Armagh
- Division 3: Kildare
- Division 4: Antrim

The 2023 Ladies' National Football League, known for sponsorship reasons as the Lidl Ladies' National Football League, is a ladies' Gaelic football competition that took place in spring 2023.

Divisions 1, 2 and 3 were contested as single divisions; only Division 4 retained the two-group structure used in 2021 and 2022.

Kerry were the Division 1 champions, defeating Galway in the final, extending Galway's unenviable record of seven League runners-up places without a single LNFL title.

== League structure ==
The 2023 Ladies' National Football League consists of three divisions of eight teams and one (Division 4) with nine teams. In Divisions 1–3, each team plays every other team in its division once, either home or away. 3 points are awarded for a win and 1 for a draw.

Division 4 is divided into an "A" and "B" section with four teams in 4A and five teams in 4B. Each team plays each other team in its section once, either home or away. 3 points are awarded for a win and 1 for a draw.

Teams by Province
Province	Division 1	Division 2	Division 3	Division 4	Total
Connacht	2	1	1	1	5
Leinster	2	2	5	3	12
Munster	3	1	1	1	6
Ulster	1	4	1	3	9
Britain	0	0	0	1	1
Total	8	8	8	9	33

== Tiebreakers for league ranking ==
If two teams are level on points, the tie-break is:

- winners of the head-to-head game are ranked ahead
- if the head-to-head match was a draw, then whichever team scored more points in the game is ranked ahead (e.g. 1-15 beats 2–12)
- if the head-to-head match was an exact draw, ranking is determined by the points difference (i.e. total scored minus total conceded in all games)
- if the points difference is equal, ranking is determined by the total scored

If three or more teams are level on league points, rankings are determined solely by points difference.

== Finals, promotions and relegations ==
The top two teams in Division 1 contest the Ladies' National Football League final.

The top two teams in Divisions 2 and 3 contest the respective division finals; the division champions are promoted.

The top two teams in each section in division 4 contest the semi-finals of the division. The division champions are promoted.

The last-placed teams in divisions 1, 2 and 3 are relegated.

== Division 1 ==
Locations of the 2023 LNFL Division 1 teams.

=== Table ===
Pos	Team	Pld	W	D	L	PF	PA	PD	Pts	Qualification
1	Kerry (C)	7	6	0	1	119	97	+22	18	Advance to LNFL final
2	Galway	7	5	1	1	94	75	+19	16	Advance to LNFL final
3	Dublin	7	5	0	2	118	98	+20	15	
4	Cork	7	4	1	2	132	94	+38	13	
5	Waterford	7	3	1	3	80	91	−11	10	
6	Mayo	7	2	0	5	99	96	+3	6	
7	Meath	7	1	1	5	67	87	−20	4	
8	Donegal	7	0	0	7	50	121	−71	0	Relegated to Division 2

Updated to match(es) played on 26 March 2023. Source: ladiesgaelic.ie
Rules for classification: Tiebreakers
(C) League champions

=== Division 1 Final ===
TG4

15 April 2023
17:00 IST (UTC+1)
LNFL Final

Report

Kerry	5-11 (26) – (13) 1-10	Galway
(HT: 2-5 – 0-4)

Croke Park, Dublin
Referee: Jonathan Murphy (Carlow)

== Division 2 ==
=== Table ===
Pos	Team	Pld	W	D	L	PF	PA	PD	Pts	Qualification
1	Armagh (P)	7	7	0	0	129	57	+72	21	Advance to Division 2 final; division winners are promoted to Division 1
2	Laois	7	5	0	2	104	100	+4	15	Advance to Division 2 final; division winners are promoted to Division 1
3	Tipperary	7	5	0	2	103	81	+22	15	
4	Westmeath	7	3	0	4	112	112	0	9	
5	Cavan	7	3	0	4	71	93	−22	9	
6	Tyrone	7	3	0	4	83	108	−25	9	
7	Monaghan	7	1	1	5	76	105	−29	4	
8	Roscommon	7	0	1	6	80	102	−22	1	Relegated to Division 3

Updated to match(es) played on 26 March 2023. Source: ladiesgaelic.ie
Rules for classification: Tiebreakers
(P) Promoted

=== Division 2 Final ===
TG4

15 April 2023
15:00 IST (UTC+1)
Final

Report

Armagh	4-09 (21) – (13) 1-10	Laois
(HT: 4-03 – 1-05)

Croke Park, Dublin
Referee: Gus Chapman

== Division 3 ==
=== Table ===
Pos	Team	Pld	W	D	L	PF	PA	PD	Pts	Qualification
1	Kildare (P)	7	6	0	1	129	53	+76	18	Advance to Division 3 final; Division winners are promoted to Division 2
2	Clare	7	5	0	2	116	69	+47	15	Advance to Division 3 final; Division winners are promoted to Division 2
3	Wexford	7	5	0	2	99	61	+38	15	
4	Down	7	5	0	2	99	73	+26	15	
5	Louth	7	4	0	3	88	86	+2	12	
6	Sligo	7	1	0	6	80	119	−39	3	
7	Offaly	7	1	0	6	86	138	−52	3	
8	Longford	7	1	0	6	71	169	−98	3	Relegated to Division 4

Updated to match(es) played on 26 March 2023. Source: ladiesgaelic.ie
Rules for classification: Tiebreakers
(P) Promoted

=== Division 3 Final ===
YouTube

16 April 2022
16:00 IST (UTC+1)
Final

Report

Kildare	2-11 (17) – (16) 2-10 (a.e.t.)	Clare
(HT: 1-02 – 0-03) (FT: 2-07 – 1-10)

Parnell Park, Donnycarney
Referee: Siobhan Coyle

== Division 4 ==
=== Division 4A ===
==== Table ====
Pos	Team	Pld	W	D	L	PF	PA	PD	Pts	Qualification
1	Antrim (P)	3	3	0	0	96	32	+64	9	Advance to Division 4 semi-finals; division champions are promoted to Division 3
2	Fermanagh	3	2	0	1	42	33	+9	6	Advance to Division 4 semi-finals; division champions are promoted to Division 3
3	Carlow	3	1	0	2	48	55	−7	3	
4	London	3	0	0	3	23	89	−66	0	

Updated to match(es) played on 5 March 2023. Source: ladiesgaelic.ie
Rules for classification: Tiebreakers
(P) Promoted

=== Division 4B ===
==== Table ====
Pos	Team	Pld	W	D	L	PF	PA	PD	Pts	Qualification
1	Leitrim	4	3	1	0	120	40	+80	10	Advance to Division 4 semi-finals; division champions are promoted to Division 3
2	Limerick	4	3	1	0	74	35	+39	10	Advance to Division 4 semi-finals; division champions are promoted to Division 3
3	Wicklow	4	2	0	2	90	43	+47	6	
4	Derry	4	1	0	3	34	76	−42	3	
5	Kilkenny	4	0	0	4	20	144	−124	0	

Updated to match(es) played on 5 March 2023. Source: ladiesgaelic.ie
Rules for classification: Tiebreakers

=== Division 4 Finals ===
26 March 2023
14:00 IST (UTC+1)
Semi-Final

Report

Antrim	3-16 (25) – (14) 1-11	Limerick
(HT: 1-12 – 0-05)

Whitehall Colmcille GAA, Whitehall, Dublin

26 March 2023
14:00 IST (UTC+1)
Semi-Final

Report

Leitrim	1-12 (15) – (13) 1-10 (a.e.t.)	Fermanagh

Templeport St Aidans, Bawnboy

YouTube

16 April 2023
14:00 IST (UTC+1)
Division 4 Final

Report

Antrim	1-19 (22) – (12) 2-06	Leitrim
(HT: 1-08 – 1-04)

Parnell Park, Donnycarney
Referee: Justin Murphy
