= 2026 Ladies' National Football League =

Planned ladies' Gaelic football competition, Ireland

League details
- Dates: 18 January – 12 April, 2026
- Teams: 32

League champions
- Winners: Cork (13th win)
- Captain: Emma Cleary
- Manager: Joe Carroll

League runners-up
- Runners-up: Galway
- Captain: Kate Geraghty
- Manager: Daniel Moynihan

Other division winners
- Division 2: Donegal
- Division 3: Louth
- Division 4: Carlow

The 2026 Ladies' National Football League, known for sponsorship reasons as the Lidl Ladies' National Football League, is a ladies' Gaelic football competition that took place in early 2026. It was won by Cork.

== League structure ==
The 2026 Ladies' National Football League consists of four divisions of eight teams. Each team plays every other team in its division once, either home or away. 3 points are awarded for a win and 1 for a draw.

Teams by Province
Province	Division 1	Division 2	Division 3	Division 4	Total
Connacht	1	1	1	2	5
Leinster	3	2	2	5	12
Munster	3	1	2	0	6
Ulster	1	4	3	1	9
Totals	8	8	8	8	32

== Tiebreakers for league ranking ==
If two teams are level on points, the tie-break is:

- winners of the head-to-head game are ranked ahead
- if the head-to-head match was a draw, then whichever team scored more points in the game is ranked ahead (e.g. 1-15 beats 2–12)
- if the head-to-head match was an exact draw, ranking is determined by the points difference (i.e. total scored minus total conceded in all games)
- if the points difference is equal, ranking is determined by the total scored

If three or more teams are level on league points, rankings are determined solely by points difference.

== Finals, promotion and relegation ==
The top two teams in Division 1 contest the Ladies' National Football League final.

The top two teams in each of Divisions 2 and 3 are promoted and contest the respective division finals.

The bottom two teams in each of divisions 1, 2 and 3 are relegated.

The top four teams in Division 4 contest the division semi-finals and final; the two division finalists are promoted.

== Division 1 ==
Locations of the 2026 LNFL Division 1 teams.

=== Table ===
Pos	Team	Pld	W	D	L	PF	PA	PD	Pts	Qualification
1	Cork (C)	7	5	1	1	100	90	+10	16	Advance to LNFL final
2	Galway	7	5	0	2	116	92	+24	15	Advance to LNFL final
3	Waterford	7	4	1	2	109	85	+24	13	
4	Kerry	7	3	0	4	101	106	−5	9	
5	Armagh	7	2	2	3	92	105	−13	8	
6	Meath (Note: Meath are ranked ahead of Dublin as they won the head-to-head game between the two teams.)	7	2	1	4	100	106	−6	7	
7	Dublin	7	2	1	4	85	107	−22	7	Relegated to Division 2
8	Kildare	7	1	2	4	94	106	−12	5	Relegated to Division 2

Source: ladiesgaelic.ie
Rules for classification: Tiebreakers
(C) League champions

=== Division 1 Final ===
TG4

11 April 2026
17:00 IST (UTC+1)
LNFL Final

Report

Cork	2-08 (14) – (9) 0-09	Galway
(HT: 0-2 – 0-7)
Gls: K Quirke 1, C Trill 1(og); Pts: K Quirke 3 (1f), A O’Sullivan 2, E Cleary 1, A Corcoran 1, A Healy 1		Pts: E Noone 2, N Divilly 2, K Slevin 2, S Divilly 1, O Divilly 1, N Ward 1

Gaelic Grounds, Limerick
Referee: Jonathan Murphy (Carlow)

== Division 2 ==
=== Table ===
Pos	Team	Pld	W	D	L	PF	PA	PD	Pts	Qualification
1	Cavan	7	5	1	1	100	86	+14	16	Advance to Division 2 final and promoted to Division 1
2	Donegal	7	5	0	2	84	60	+24	15	Advance to Division 2 final and promoted to Division 1
3	Mayo	7	4	2	1	123	78	+45	14	
4	Tyrone	7	4	1	2	138	116	+22	13	
5	Tipperary	7	3	1	3	96	96	0	10	
6	Monaghan	7	2	1	4	101	120	−19	7	
7	Westmeath	7	2	0	5	107	135	−28	6	Relegated to Division 3
8	Wexford	7	0	0	7	83	141	−58	0	Relegated to Division 3

Source: ladiesgaelic.ie
Rules for classification: Tiebreakers

=== Division 2 Final ===
TG4

11 April 2026
15:00 IST (UTC+1)
Final

Report

Cavan	0-08 (8) – (13) 2-07	Donegal
(HT: 0-4 – 0-2)

St Tiernach's Park, Clones
Referee: Angela Gallagher (Meath)

== Division 3 ==
=== Table ===
Pos	Team	Pld	W	D	L	PF	PA	PD	Pts	Qualification
1	Louth	7	5	1	1	99	61	+38	16	Advance to Division 3 final and promoted to Division 2
2	Antrim	7	5	1	1	122	88	+34	16	Advance to Division 3 final and promoted to Division 2
3	Down	7	4	1	2	122	103	+19	13	
4	Fermanagh	7	3	2	2	116	120	−4	11	
5	Roscommon	7	2	3	2	103	101	+2	9	
6	Clare (Note: Clare are ranked ahead of Laois as they won the head-to-head game between the two teams.)	7	2	1	4	105	132	−27	7	
7	Laois	7	2	1	4	118	106	+12	7	Relegated to Division 4
8	Limerick	7	0	0	7	57	131	−74	0	Relegated to Division 4

Source: ladiesgaelic.ie
Rules for classification: Tiebreakers

=== Division 3 Final ===
Spórt TG4 YouTube

11 April 2026
13:00 BST (UTC+1)
Final

Report

Antrim	1-09 (12) – (13) 1-10	Louth

Oliver Plunkett Park, Crossmaglen
Referee: Gus Chapman

== Division 4 ==
=== Table ===
Pos	Team	Pld	W	D	L	PF	PA	PD	Pts	Qualification
1	Carlow (P)	7	7	0	0	140	55	+85	21	Advance to Division 4 semi-finals; division finalists are promoted to Division 3
2	Leitrim (P)	7	6	0	1	184	80	+104	18	Advance to Division 4 semi-finals; division finalists are promoted to Division 3
3	Sligo	7	5	0	2	143	87	+56	15	Advance to Division 4 semi-finals; division finalists are promoted to Division 3
4	Offaly	7	4	0	3	134	81	+53	12	Advance to Division 4 semi-finals; division finalists are promoted to Division 3
5	Longford	7	3	0	4	103	120	−17	9	
6	Wicklow	7	2	0	5	86	116	−30	6	
7	Derry	7	1	0	6	88	112	−24	3	
8	Kilkenny	7	0	0	7	21	248	−227	0	

Source: ladiesgaelic.ie
Rules for classification: Tiebreakers
(P) Promoted

=== Division 4 Finals ===
29 March 2026
Semi-Final

Report

Carlow	4-11 (23) – (14) 2-08	Offaly
(HT: 3-07 – 1-02)
Gls: A Kiernan 2, C Ní Shé 1pen, S O’Neill 1 Pts: C Ní Shé 3 (1x2p, 1f), Bronagh Nolan 2, E Hayden 2, S Doyle 1, R Bailey 1, M Townsend 1, A Webb 1f		Gls: C Lynam 2 Pts: C Lynam 4 (3fs), M Mann 2, N Buckley 1, E Hand 1f

McCann Park, Portarlington
Referee: A Gallagher (Meath)

29 March 2026
Semi-Final

Report

Leitrim	2-10 (16) – (14) 1-11 (a.e.t.)	Sligo

Orchard Park, Elphin
Referee: Gerard Canny (Mayo)

Spórt TG4 YouTube

12 April 2026
14:00 IST (UTC+1)
Division 4 Final

Report

Carlow	3-13 (22) – (21) 4-09 (a.e.t.)	Leitrim
(HT: 0-7 – 1-4) (FT: 1-11 – 2-8)

St Brendan's Park, Birr
Referee: Conor McCarthy
