= 2025 Ladies' National Football League =

Ladies' Gaelic football competition, Ireland

League details
- Dates: 25 January – 13 April 2025
- Teams: 32

League champions
- Winners: Kerry (13th win)
- Captain: Cáit Lynch
- Manager: Mark Bourke

League runners-up
- Runners-up: Armagh
- Captain: Clodagh McCambridge
- Manager: Darnell Parkinson

Other division winners
- Division 2: Galway
- Division 3: Cavan
- Division 4: Antrim

The 2025 Ladies' National Football League, known for sponsorship reasons as the Lidl Ladies' National Football League, was a ladies' Gaelic football competition taking place in early 2025.

Kerry were the winners, defeating Armagh in the final.

== League structure ==
The 2025 Ladies' National Football League consists of four divisions of eight teams. Each team plays every other team in its division once, either home or away. 3 points are awarded for a win and 1 for a draw.

Teams by Province
Province	Division 1	Division 2	Division 3	Division 4	Total
Connacht	1	2	0	2	5
Leinster	3	1	5	3	12
Munster	2	3	1	0	6
Ulster	2	2	2	3	9
Totals	8	8	8	8	32

== Tiebreakers for league ranking ==
If two teams are level on points, the tie-break is:

- winners of the head-to-head game are ranked ahead
- if the head-to-head match was a draw, then whichever team scored more points in the game is ranked ahead (e.g. 1-15 beats 2–12)
- if the head-to-head match was an exact draw, ranking is determined by the points difference (i.e. total scored minus total conceded in all games)
- if the points difference is equal, ranking is determined by the total scored

If three or more teams are level on league points, rankings are determined solely by points difference.

== Finals, promotion and relegation ==
The top two teams in Division 1 contest the Ladies' National Football League final.

The top two teams in each of Divisions 2 and 3 are promoted and contest the respective division finals.

The bottom two teams in each of divisions 1, 2 and 3 are relegated.

The top four teams in Division 4 contest the division semi-finals and final; the two division finalists are promoted.

== Division 1 ==
Locations of the 2025 LNFL Division 1 teams.

=== Table ===
Pos	Team	Pld	W	D	L	PF	PA	PD	Pts	Qualification
1	Kerry	7	5	0	2	104	79	+25	15	Advance to LNFL final
2	Armagh	7	5	0	2	120	97	+23	15	Advance to LNFL final
3	Waterford	7	4	1	2	131	85	+46	13	
4	Dublin	7	4	1	2	101	83	+18	13	
5	Meath	7	4	0	3	100	98	+2	12	
6	Kildare	7	3	0	4	88	96	−8	9	
7	Mayo	7	1	0	6	78	117	−39	3	Relegated to Division 2
8	Tyrone	7	1	0	6	68	135	−67	3	Relegated to Division 2

Source: ladiesgaelic.ie
Rules for classification: Tiebreakers

=== Division 1 Final ===
12 April 2025
17:00 IST (UTC+1)
LNFL Final

Report

Kerry	4-14 (26) – (11) 0-11	Armagh

Croke Park, Dublin
Referee: Shane Curley

== Division 2 ==
=== Table ===
Pos	Team	Pld	W	D	L	PF	PA	PD	Pts	Qualification
1	Galway	7	7	0	0	167	51	+116	21	Advance to Division 2 final and promoted to Division 1
2	Cork	7	6	0	1	121	64	+57	18	Advance to Division 2 final and promoted to Division 1
3	Tipperary	7	3	0	4	82	85	−3	9	
4	Donegal	7	2	3	2	60	75	−15	9	
5	Monaghan	7	3	0	4	71	110	−39	9	
6	Westmeath	7	2	1	4	70	119	−49	7	
7	Roscommon	7	1	1	5	90	106	−16	4	Relegated to Division 3
8	Clare	7	1	1	5	69	120	−51	4	Relegated to Division 3

Source: ladiesgaelic.ie
Rules for classification: Tiebreakers

=== Division 2 Final ===
TG4

12 April 2025
15:00 IST (UTC+1)
Final

Report

Cork	1-05 (8) – (14) 2-08	Galway
(HT: 1-3 – 0-3)
Gls: K Quirke 1 Pts: K Quirke 3fs, E Cleary 1, L O’Mahony 1		Gls: R Leonard 1, L Noone 1 Pts: R Leonard 5fs, A Davoren 1, O Divilly 1, H Noone 1

Croke Park, Dublin
Referee: Philip Conway

== Division 3 ==
=== Table ===
Pos	Team	Pld	W	D	L	PF	PA	PD	Pts	Qualification
1	Cavan	7	6	0	1	137	67	+70	18	Advance to Division 3 final and promoted to Division 2
2	Wexford	7	5	1	1	107	62	+45	16	Advance to Division 3 final and promoted to Division 2
3	Louth	7	5	0	2	127	77	+50	15	
4	Down (Note: Down received a walkover from Carlow.)	7	4	1	2	82	82	0	13	
5	Laois	7	3	1	3	119	121	−2	10	
6	Limerick	7	2	1	4	100	84	+16	7	
7	Carlow	7	1	0	6	66	137	−71	3	Relegated to Division 4
8	Offaly	7	0	0	7	58	166	−108	0	Relegated to Division 4

Source: ladiesgaelic.ie
Rules for classification: Tiebreakers

=== Division 3 Final ===
TG4

13 April 2025
14:00 IST (UTC+1)
Final

Report

Cavan	2-10 (16) – (9) 0-09	Wexford

Integral GAA Grounds, Drogheda

== Division 4 ==
=== Table ===
Pos	Team	Pld	W	D	L	PF	PA	PD	Pts	Qualification
1	Antrim (P)	7	7	0	0	171	84	+87	21	Advance to Division 4 semi-finals; division finalists are promoted to Division 3
2	Fermanagh (P)	7	6	0	1	164	81	+83	18	Advance to Division 4 semi-finals; division finalists are promoted to Division 3
3	Sligo	7	5	0	2	110	77	+33	15	Advance to Division 4 semi-finals; division finalists are promoted to Division 3
4	Leitrim	7	3	1	3	131	95	+36	10	Advance to Division 4 semi-finals; division finalists are promoted to Division 3
5	Wicklow	7	3	0	4	116	99	+17	9	
6	Longford	7	2	1	4	134	113	+21	7	
7	Derry	7	1	0	6	81	145	−64	3	
8	Kilkenny	7	0	0	7	27	240	−213	0	

Source: ladiesgaelic.ie
Rules for classification: Tiebreakers
(P) Promoted

=== Division 4 Finals ===
30 March 2025
13:00 IST (UTC+1)
Semi-Final

Report

Fermanagh	5-12 (27) – (22) 3-13	Sligo

St Barry's, Termonbarry

30 March 2025
14:00 IST (UTC+1)
Semi-Final

Report

Antrim	5-08 (23) – (19) 3-10	Leitrim

O'Raghallaigh Park, Kingscourt

TG4

13 April 2025
15:00 IST (UTC+1)
Division 4 Final

Report

Fermanagh	0-11 (11) – (13) 2-07	Antrim

St Tiernach's Park, Clones
Referee: Eoghan O'Neill
