= 2020 All-Ireland Senior Ladies' Football Championship =

All-Ireland Senior Ladies' Football Championship 2020
Championship details
- Dates: 31 October – 20 December 2020
- Teams: 12

All-Ireland champions
- Winners: Dublin (5th win)
- Captain: Sinéad Aherne
- Manager: Mick Bohan

All Ireland Runners-up
- Runners-up: Cork
- Captain: Doireann O'Sullivan
- Manager: Ephie Fitzgerald

Provincial champions

Championship Statistics
- Matches Played: 15
- Total Goals: 59 (3.93 per game)
- Total Points: 363 (24.20 per game)
- Top Scorer: Aimee Mackin (5-17) (32 points)
- Player of the Year: Aimee Mackin (Armagh)

The 2020 All-Ireland Senior Ladies' Football Championship was the 47th edition of the Ladies' Gaelic Football Association's premier inter-county ladies' Gaelic Football tournament.

The impact of the COVID-19 pandemic on Gaelic games forced the delay of the tournament until late in the year, and it was shortened, with no provincial championships taking place.

Dublin were the winners for the fourth year in a row.

== Format ==
=== Group stage ===
The 12 teams are drawn into four groups of three teams. Each team play each other team in its group once, earning three points for a win and one for a draw.

=== Knockout stage ===
The winners of each group compete in the All-Ireland semi-finals.

== Teams ==
Counties	Flag colours	Captain (2020)	Manager (2020)	Championships won	Last championship
Armagh LGFA		Kelly Mallon	Ronan Murphy	—	—
Cavan LGFA		Neasa Byrd	James Daly	1	1977
Cork LGFA		Doireann O'Sullivan	Ephie Fitzgerald	11	2016
Donegal LGFA		Geraldine McLaughlin	Maxi Curran	—	—
Dublin LGFA		Sinéad Ahearne	Mick Bohan	5	2020
Galway LGFA		Louise Ward	Tim Rabbitt	1	2004
Kerry LGFA		Anna Galvin	Darragh Long & Declan Quill	11	1993
Mayo LGFA		Sinéad Cafferky	Peter Leahy	4	2003
Monaghan LGFA		Cora Courtney	Ciarán Murphy	2	1997
Tipperary LGFA		Samantha Lambert	Shane Ronayne	3	1980
Tyrone LGFA		Neamh Woods	Gerry Moane	—	—
Waterford LGFA		Karen McGrath	Ciaran Curran	5	1998

== Venues ==
Match Locations
Venues used for the 2020 All-Ireland Senior Ladies' Football Championship.

== Fixtures and results ==
Group games took place between 30 October and 15 November 2020.

Key to colours
Advance to All-Ireland semi-finals

=== Group 1 table result ===
Team	Pld	W	D	L	Group Points	Score Difference
Cork	2	2	0	0	6	+21
Kerry	2	1	0	1	3	+13
Cavan	2	0	0	2	0	–34

==== Group 1 results ====
1st of November 2020
13:00 GMT
Group 1 Round 1

Report

Kerry	5–14 (29) – 0–13 (13)	Cavan
(HT: 2–07 – 0–6)
Gls: L Ní Mhuircheartaigh 2, S O'Shea 2, A Murphy 1 Pts: L Ní Mhuircheartaigh 4 (1f), S O'Shea 2, A Murphy 1, L Scanlon 2, F Tagney 2, D O'Leary 1, H O'Donoghue 1, E O'Leary 1.		Pts: A Gilsenan 0–5 (4f), A Sheridan 0–3, D English 0–2, L McVeety 0–1, G Sheridan 0–1, E Halton 0–1.

St. Brendan's Park, Birr, County Offaly
Referee: Jonathan Murphy (Carlow)
Attendance: 0

7th of November 2020
15:00 GMT
Group 1 Round 2

Report

Cork	1–14 (17) – 0–14 (14)	Kerry
(HT: 0–9 – 1–5)
Gls: S Noonan 1 Pts: O Finn 0–5 (5f), S Noonan 2, D O'Sullivan 4, C O'Sullivan 2, A T O'Sullivan 1		Pts: L Ní Mhuircheartaigh 10 (8f), S O'Shea 2, A Galvin 1, A Murphy 1.

Austin Stack Park, Tralee, County Kerry
Referee: John Devlin (Galway)
Attendance: 0

15th of November 2020
13:00 GMT
Group 1 Round 3

Report

Cavan	2-06 (12) – 7-09 (30)	Cork
(HT: 2-2 – 3-4)
Gls: L McVeety 1 (1 pen), G Sheridan 1 Pts: A Gilsenan 4 (2f), D English 1, C Finnegan 1		Gls: Á O'Sullivan 3, O Finn 1, S Noonan 2, S O'Leary 1-0; Pts: Á O'Sullivan 1, O Finn 3 (2f), S Noonan 2, D O'Sullivan 3.

Austin Stack Park, Tralee, County Kerry
Referee: Seamus Mulvihill (Kerry)
Attendance: 0

=== Group 2 table result ===
Team	Pld	W	D	L	Group Points	Score Difference
Galway	2	2	0	0	6	+2
Monaghan	2	1	0	1	3	0
Tipperary	2	0	0	2	0	–2

==== Group 2 results ====
31st of October 2020
15:00 GMT
Group 2 Round 1

Report

Tipperary	1–14 (17) – 1–15 (18)	Galway
(HT: 0–5 – 1–10)
Gls: A Moloney 1 Pts: A Moloney 10 (7f), C Kennedy 0–1, O O'Dwyer 0–1, E Morrissey 0–1, R Howard 0–1		Gls: L Hannon 1 Pts: T Leonard 0–6 (6f), L Hannon 1, M Glynn 2, L Noone 1, O Divilly 1, M Seoighe 1, N Ward 1, A Davoren 1, L Ward 1.

Gaelic Grounds, Limerick
Referee: Eamonn Moran (Kerry)
Attendance: 0

6th of November 2020
19:30 GMT
Group 2 Round 2

Report

Monaghan	0–17 (17) – 2–10 (16)	Tipperary
(HT: 0–12 – 2–6)
Pts: C McAnespie 3, L Kerley 3 (3f), E McCarron 3, M Atkinson 2, C Courtney 2, C Treanor 1, L McEnaney 1, A McAnespie 1, S Coyle 1		Gls: A Moloney 1, R Howard 1 Pts: A Moloney 7 (5f), R Howard 1, E Morrissey 1, S Lambert 1.

Parnell Park, Dublin
Referee: Kevin Phelan (Laois)
Attendance: 0

15th of November
13:00 GMT
Group 2 Round 3

Report

Galway	2–13 (19) – 3–09 (18)	Monaghan
(HT: 0–10 – 0–06)
Gls: L Ward 1, L Noone 1 Pts: O Divilly 5 (1f), T Leonard 5 (4f), L Ward 1, A Davoren 1, L Hannon 1		Gls: E McCarron 2, T McNally-Scott 1 Pts: E McCarron 7 (2f), R Courtney 1, C Courtney 1.

Páirc Seán Mac Diarmada, Leitrim
Referee: Mel Kenny (Mayo)
Attendance: 0

=== Group 3 table result ===
Team	Pld	W	D	L	Group Points	Score Difference
Dublin	2	2	0	0	6	+7
Donegal	2	1	0	1	3	+7
Waterford	2	0	0	2	0	–14

==== Group 3 results ====
31st of October
17:00 GMT
Group 3 Round 1

Report

Dublin	2–13 (19) – 2–10 (16)	Donegal
(HT: 1–07 – 1–02)
Gls: S Aherne 1, N Healy 1 Pts: S Aherne 6, N Healy 2, J Dunne 2, L Magee 1, S McCaffrey 1, S Goldrick 1		Gls: G McLaughlin 1, N Gordon 1 Pts: G McLaughlin 5 (5f), K Guthrie 3 (2f), Y Bonner 1, K Herron 1

Kingspan Breffni Park, Cavan
Referee: Brendan Rice (Down)
Attendance: 0

7th of November
13:00 GMT
Group 3 Round 2

Report

Waterford	1–10 (13) – 0–17 (17)	Dublin
(HT: 0–09 – 0–07)
Gls: R Tobin 1 Pts: C Fennell 7 (5f), R Tobin 1, K Murray 1, A Wall 1		Pts: S Aherne 6 (4f), C Rowe 3, N McEvoy 2, C O'Connor 2, O Nolan 1, L Davey 1, S McCaffrey 1, L Collins 1

Baltinglass, Wicklow
Referee: Barry Redmond (Wexford)
Attendance: 0

14th of November 2020
13:00 GMT
Group 3 Round 3

Report

Donegal	2–13 (19) – 0–09 (9)	Waterford
(HT: 2–06 – 0–03)
Gls: G McLaughlin 1, K Guthrie 1 Pts: G McLaughlin 5 (3f), K Guthrie 3, Y Bonner 2, K Herron 2, N Gordon 1		Pts: C Fennell 6 (6f), A Wall 1, K Murray 1, R Tobin 1.

Cusack Park, Mullingar, County Westmeath
Referee: Declan Carolan (Down)
Attendance: 0

=== Group 4 table result ===
Team	Pld	W	D	L	Group Points	Score Difference
Armagh	2	2	0	0	6	+17
Mayo	2	1	0	1	3	+20
Tyrone	2	0	0	2	0	–37

==== Group 4 results ====
30th of October 2020
19:30 GMT
Group 4 Round 1

Report

Tyrone	3–13 (22) – 6–16 (34)	Armagh
(HT: 2–09 – 5–07)
Gls: N O'Neill 2, C McCaffrey 1 Pts: N O'Neill 4, C McCaffrey 4, G Rafferty 3, E Brennan 1, C Kelly 1		Gls: A McCoy 3, A Mackin 1, K Mallon 1, C O'Hanlon 1 Pts: A Mackin 6 (1fs), K Mallon 3 (3f), C O'Hanlon 2, C Marley 2, Lavery 2, Grimes 1

Kingspan Breffni Park, Cavan
Referee: Garryowen McMahon (Mayo)
Attendance: 0

7th of November 2020
13:00 GMT
Group 4 Round 2

Report

Mayo	4–17 (29) – 0–4 (4)	Tyrone
(HT: 2–05 – 0–1)
Gls: S Rowe 2, D Doherty 1, T O'Connor 1 Pts: S Rowe 9 (4f), D Doherty 2, G Kelly 3, A Gilroy 1, F Doherty 1, Clodagh McManamon 1		Pts: E Brennan 0–2, N O'Neill 0–1, G Rafferty 0–1 (1f).

Páirc Seán Mac Diarmada, Leitrim
Referee: Shane Curley (Galway)
Attendance: 0

14th of November 2020
15:15 GMT
Group 4 Round 3

Report

Armagh	4–12 (24) – 1–16 (19)	Mayo
(HT: 2–07 – 0–11)
Gls: A Mackin 2, K Mallon 1, C Marley 1 Pts: A Mackin 7 (2f), K Mallon 3 (2f), B Mackin 1, A McCoy 1.		Gls: F Doherty 1 Pts: G Kelly 4, A Gilroy 1, S Rowe 2, S Cafferky 2, D Doherty 4 (2f), M McHale 2, F Doherty 1.

Parnell Park, Dublin
Referee: Jonathan Murphy (Carlow)
Attendance: 0

== All-Ireland semi-finals ==
TG4

28 November 2020
16:30 GMT
Semi-final 2

Report

Armagh	3–08 (17) – (22) 3–13	Dublin
(HT: 2–06 – 2–06)
Gls: A Mackin 2 (1pen), A McCoy 1 Pts: A Mackin 4 (2fs), K Mallon 2fs, C Marley 1, B Mackin 1		Gls: C Rowe 2 (1pen), N Owens 1 Pts: C Rowe 4 (2fs), N Healy 3, L Davey 2, S McCaffrey 1, S Aherne 1f, S Killeen 1, K Sullivan 1

Kingspan Breffni Park, Cavan
Referee: Gerryowen McMahon (Mayo)
Attendance: 0

After the semi-final between Cork and Galway, LGFA president Marie Hickey criticised the Galway ladies for not vacating their dressing room in sufficient time to complete their warm-up, after they complained about being hurried into doing so.

TG4

6 December 2020
13:00 GMT
Semi-final 1

Report

Cork	2–17 (23) – (13) 0–13	Galway
(HT: 2–05 – 0–04)
Gls: C O'Sullivan 1, M Duggan 1 Pts: O Finn 9 (8f), C O'Sullivan 2, M Duggan 1, Á O'Sullivan 1, E Kiely 1, D O'Sullivan 1, S O'Leary 1, M O'Callaghan 1		Pts: T Leonard 6 (5f), M Seoighe 3, O Divilly 2, A Trill 1, A Morrissey 1

Croke Park, Dublin
Referee: Seamus Mulvihill (Kerry)
Attendance: 0

== All-Ireland final ==
TG4

20 December 2020
15:30 GMT
Final

Report

Dublin	1–10 (13) – (8) 1–05	Cork
(HT: 0–03 – 1–03)
Gls: C Rowe 1(pen); Pts: C Rowe (3fs), N Healy 2, N Owens 2, A Kane 1, S Aherne (1f), K Sullivan 1		Gls: A O'Sullivan 1 Pts: O Finn 3 (2fs), A O'Sullivan 1, C O'Sullivan 1

Croke Park, Dublin
Referee: Jonathan Murphy (Carlow)
Attendance: 0

== Awards ==
=== Player of the Year ===
TG4 Senior Players' Player of the Year – Aimee Mackin Armagh

=== Senior Team of the Year ===
No.	Position	Player	Team	Flag	No. of All Stars
1	Goalkeeper	Martina O'Brien	Cork		1
2	Right corner back	Martha Byrne	Dublin		1
3	Full back	Clodagh McCambridge	Armagh		1
4	Left corner back	Eimear Meaney	Cork		1
5	Right half back	Melissa Duggan	Cork		2
6	Centre half back	Blaithin Mackin	Armagh		1
7	Left half back	Sinéad Goldrick	Dublin		8
8	Midfield	Jennifer Dunne	Dublin		1
9	Midfield	Louise Ward	Galway		2
10	Right half forward	Carla Rowe	Dublin		4
11	Centre half forward	Lyndsey Davey	Dublin		6
12	Left half forward	Aimee Mackin	Armagh		3
13	Right corner forward	Áine O'Sullivan	Cork		1
14	Full forward	Aishling Moloney	Tipperary		1
15	Left corner forward	Noëlle Healy	Dublin		5

== Championship statistics ==
=== Scoring list ===
Scoring list
No.	Name	Team	Flag	Goals	Points	Total points
1	Aimee Mackin	Armagh		5	17	32
2	Aishling Moloney	Tipperary		2	17	23
	Orla Finn	Cork		1	20	23
3	Louise Ní Mhuircheartaigh	Kerry		2	14	20
4	Carla Rowe	Dublin		3	10	19
5	Sarah Rowe	Mayo		2	11	17
	Sinéad Ahearne	Dublin		1	14	17
	Tracey Leonard	Galway		0	17	17
6	Aine O'Sullivan	Cork		4	4	16
	Geraldine McLaughlin	Donegal		2	10	16
7	Ellen McCarron	Monaghan		2	8	14
	Kelly Mallon	Armagh		2	8	14
8	Aoife McCoy	Armagh		4	1	13
	Saoirse Noonan	Cork		3	4	13
	Chloe Fennell	Waterford		0	13	13
9	Niamh O'Neill	Tyrone		2	5	11
10	Síofra O'Shea	Kerry		2	4	10
	Noëlle Healy	Dublin		1	7	10
11	Karen Guthrie	Donegal		1	6	9
	Deirdre Doherty	Mayo		1	6	9
	Aisling Gilsenan	Cavan		0	9	9
12	Ciara O'Sullivan	Cork		1	5	8
	Doireann O'Sullivan	Cork		0	8	8
13	Chloe McCaffrey	Tyrone		1	4	7
	Grace Kelly	Mayo		0	7	7
	Olivia Divilly	Galway		0	7	7
14	Catherine Marley	Armagh		1	3	6
15	Louise Ward	Galway		1	2	5
	Fiona Doherty	Mayo		1	2	5
	Andrea Murphy	Kerry		1	2	5
	Nicole Owens	Dublin		1	2	5
	Roisin Howard	Tipperary		1	2	5
	Caroline O'Hanlon	Armagh		1	2	5
	Roisin Tobin	Waterford		1	2	5
	Lucy Hannon	Galway		1	2	5
16	Lynsey Noone	Galway		1	1	4
	Melissa Duggan	Cork		1	4	4
	Geraldine Sheridan	Cavan		1	1	4
	Sadhbh O'Leary	Cork		1	1	4
	Nicole Gordon	Donegal		1	1	4
	Lauren McVeety	Cavan		1	1	4
	Mairéad Seoighe	Galway		0	4	4
	Gráinne Rafferty	Tyrone		0	4	4
17	Tamara O'Connor	Mayo		1	0	3
	Therese Scott	Monaghan		1	0	3
	Louise Kerley	Monaghan		0	3	3
	Donna English	Cavan		0	3	3
	Katy Herron	Donegal		0	3	3
	Sarah McCaffrey	Dublin		0	3	3
	Aishling Sheridan	Cavan		0	3	3
	Emma Brennan	Tyrone		0	3	3
	Shauna Coyle	Monaghan		0	3	3
	Lyndsey Davey	Dublin		0	3	3
	Ciara McAnespie	Monaghan		0	3	3
	Yvonne Bonner	Donegal		0	3	3
	Cora Courtney	Monaghan		0	3	3
18	Blaithin Mackin	Armagh		0	2	2
	Emma Morrissey	Tipperary		0	2	2
	Niamh McEvoy	Dublin		0	2	2
	Megan Glynn	Galway		0	2	2
	Jennifer Dunne	Dublin		0	2	2
	Sinéad Cafferky	Mayo		0	2	2
	Kate Sullivan	Dublin		0	2	2
	Muireann Atkinson	Monaghan		0	2	2
	Andrea Trill	Galway		0	2	2
	Eve Lavery	Armagh		0	2	2
	Katie Murray	Waterford		0	2	2
	Lorraine Scanlon	Kerry		0	2	2
	Aileen Gilroy	Mayo		0	2	2
	Fiadhna Tangney	Kerry		0	2	2
	Ailbhe Davoren	Galway		0	2	2
	Aileen Wall	Waterford		0	2	2
	Mary McHale	Mayo		0	2	2
19	Sinéad Goldrick	Dublin		0	1	1
	Orlagh Nolan	Dublin		0	1	1
	Emma Halton	Cavan		0	1	1
	Lauren Magee	Dublin		0	1	1
	Aoife McAnespie	Monaghan		0	1	1
	Orla O'Dwyer	Tipperary		0	1	1
	Anna Galvin	Kerry		0	1	1
	Eilish O'Leary	Kerry		0	1	1
	Caitlin Kelly	Tyrone		0	1	1
	Ciara Finnegan	Cavan		0	1	1
	Clodagh McManamon	Mayo		0	1	1
	Tiarna Grimes	Galway		0	1	1
	Samantha Lambert	Tipperary		0	1	1
	Aoife Kane	Dublin		0	1	1
	Nicole Ward	Galway		0	1	1
	Máire O'Callaghan	Cork		0	1	1
	Siobhán Killeen	Dublin		0	1	1
	Lucy Collins	Dublin		0	1	1
	Rosemary Courtney	Monaghan		0	1	1
	Laura McEneaney	Monaghan		0	1	1
	Caitlin Kennedy	Tipperary		0	1	1
	Eimear Kiely	Cork		0	1	1
	Hannah O'Donoghue	Kerry		0	1	1
	Danielle O'Leary	Kerry		0	1	1

=== Team statistics ===
Team statistics breakdown
Teams	Total score	Games	Points per game average	Points Per Game Rank	Goals	Points	Goals Rank	Points Rank	First half (total score)	Average points (first half)	Second half (total score)	Average points (second half)	Clean sheets (goals)	No. of scoring players in season
Cork	78	4	19.5	4th	11	45	2nd	2nd	39	9.75	39	9.75	2	9
Armagh	75	3	25	1st	13	36	1st	4th	47	15.67	28	9.33	0	8
Dublin	71	4	17.75	5th	6	53	3rd	1st	32	8	39	9.75	0	16
Galway	49	3	16.33	8th	3	40	6th	3rd	27	9	22	7.33	0	10
Mayo	48	2	24	2nd	5	33	4th	5th	22	11	26	13	1	9
Kerry	43	2	21.5	3rd	5	28	4th	6th	21	10.5	22	11	1	9
Donegal	35	2	17.5	6th	4	23	5th	9th	17	8.5	18	9	1	5
Monaghan	35	2	17.5	6th	3	26	6th	7th	18	9	17	8.5	0	11
Tipperary	33	2	16.5	7th	3	24	6th	8th	17	8.5	16	8	1	6
Tyrone	26	2	13	9th	3	17	6th	11th	16	8	10	5	0	5
Cavan	25	2	12.5	10th	2	19	7th	10th	14	7	11	5.5	0	7
Waterford	22	2	11	11th	1	19	8th	10th	12	6	10	5	1	4

=== Miscellaneous statistics ===
- Most goals by team in the season – 13 goals Armagh
- Most points by team in the season – 53 points Dublin
- Top scorer in a single game – Sarah Rowe (2,09) 15 points ( Mayo vs Tyrone) (Group 4 Round 2)
- Widest winning margin – 25 points ( Mayo (4–17) vs (0–04) Tyrone) (Group 4 Round 2)
- Most goals in a single match – 9 goals Tyrone (3–13) vs (6–16) Armagh & Cavan (2–06) vs (7–09) Cork
- Most points in a single match – 30 points Cork (2–17) vs (0–13) Galway (Semi-Final 2)
- Most goals by one team in a match – 7 goals Cavan (2–06) vs (7–09) Cork (Group 1 Round 3)
- Highest aggregate score in a single match – 56 points Tyrone (3–13) vs (6–16) Armagh (Group 4 Round 1)
- Lowest aggregate score in a single match – 21 points Dublin (1–10) vs (1–05) Cork (Final)

== See also ==
- 2020 All-Ireland Intermediate Ladies' Football Championship
- 2020 All-Ireland Junior Ladies' Football Championship
- All-Ireland Senior Ladies' Football Championship
