= 2020 All-Ireland Intermediate Ladies' Football Championship =

Tournament details
- Level: Intermediate
- Year: 2020
- Trophy: Mary Quinn Memorial Cup
- Sponsor: TG4, Lidl, AIG
- Date: 31st of October – 20th of December
- Teams: 13

Winners
- Champions: Meath LGFA (1st win)
- Manager: Eamonn Murray
- Captain: Máire O'Shaughnessy
- Qualify for: Senior Ladies' Football Championship

Runners-up
- Runners-up: Westmeath LGFA
- Manager: Sean Finnegan
- Captain: Fiona Claffey

Other
- Matches played: 18
- Total scored: 91 goals (5 gpg) 342 points (19 ppg)
- Player of the Year: Vicki Wall (Meath)
- Top Scorer: Stacey Grimes (4,18) 30 points
- Website: https://ladiesgaelic.ie/

The 2020 All-Ireland Intermediate Ladies' Football Championship was the 23rd contested edition of the Ladies' Gaelic Football Association's secondary inter-county Ladies' Gaelic football tournament.

The impact of the COVID-19 pandemic on Gaelic games forced the delay of the tournament until late in the year.

Meath LGFA were the winners for the first time in their history and were promoted to the All-Ireland Senior Ladies' Football Championship in 2021.

== Format ==
=== Group stage ===
13 counties competed in the 2020 tournament. There were three groups of three and one group of four. Each team played the other team's in their group once, earning three points for a win and one for a draw.

=== Knockout stage ===
The winners of each group competed in the All-Ireland semi-finals.

== Teams ==
Counties	Flag colours	Captain (2020)	Manager (2020)	Intermediate Championships	Last Win
Clare LGFA		Ellie O'Gorman	James Murrihy	3	2009
Down LGFA		Kate McKay	Caoibhe Sloan & Peter Lynch	1	2014
Kildare LGFA		Grace Clifford	Daniel Moynihan	1	2016
Laois LGFA		Anna Healy	Donie Brennan	1	2000
Leitrim LGFA		Clare Owens	Hugh Donnelly	1	2007
Longford LGFA		Michelle Farrell	Enda Sheridan	1	1996
Louth LGFA		Aoife Byrne	Wayne Freeman	–	–
Meath LGFA		Máire O'Shaughnessy	Eamon Murray	1	2020
Offaly LGFA		Annie Kehoe	John Ryan	–	–
Roscommon LGFA		Laura Fleming & Jenny Higgins	Michael Finneran	1	2005
Sligo LGFA		Nicola Brennan	Micheál Bohan	–	–
Westmeath LGFA		Fiona Claffey	Sean Finnegan	2	2011
Wexford LGFA		Aoife Tormey	Paul Carty	–	–

== Venues ==
Match Locations
Venues used for the 2020 All-Ireland Intermediate Ladies' Football Championship.

== Fixtures and results ==
Key to colours
Advance to All-Ireland semi-finals

=== Group 1 Table ===
Team	Pld	W	D	L	Group Points	Score Difference
Roscommon	2	2	0	0	6	+12
Wexford	2	1	0	1	3	+5
Offaly	2	0	0	2	0	–17

==== Group 1 Results ====
21st of October 2020
13:00 GMT
Group 1 Rd 1

Wexford	3-10 (19) – 1-08 (11)	Offaly
(HT: 3-05 – 0-5)
Gls: B Breen 1, C Murray 1, A Murphy 1 Pts: B Breen 2, S Hamilton 2, A Wilson 1, C Murray 5		Gls: C Sheridan 1 Pts: M Byrne 1, G Egan 3, K Kenny 2, E McEvoy 2

Clane, County Kildare
Referee: Kevin Phelan (County Laois)
Attendance: 0

8th of November
13:00 GMT
Group 1 Rd 2

Offaly	1-15 (18) – 2-09 (15)	Wexford
(HT: 1-10 – 1-04)
Gls: S Glennon 1 Pts: L Fleming 3, A Gavin 4, A O'Connor 5, S Fleming 1, J Cregg 1, L Brady 1		Gls: C Murray 1, A Murphy 1 Pts: C Murray 4, C Banville 3, A Murphy 1, S Harding Kenny 1

St. Tiernach's Park, Clones, County Monaghan
Referee: Brendan Rice (County Down)
Attendance: 0

15th of November
13:00 GMT
Group 1 Rd 3

Offaly	4-04 (16) – 5-10 (25)	Roscommon
(HT: 3-02 – 2-04)
Gls: K Kenny 1, E McEvoy 1, M Byrne 1, G Egan 1 Pts: K Kenny 2, G Egan 2		Gls: J Cregg 1, S Glennon 2, A O'Connor 1, L O'Rourke 1 Pts: L Fleming 3, A Gavin 1, S Glennon 1, A O'Connor 5

Kinnegad, County Westmeath
Referee: Shane Curley (County Galway)
Attendance: 0

=== Group 2 Table ===
Team	Pld	W	D	L	Group Points	Score Difference
Westmeath	2	2	0	0	6	+36
Louth	2	1	0	1	3	−3
Longford	2	0	0	2	0	−33

==== Group 2 Results ====
31st of October
13:00 GMT
Group 2 Rd 1

Longford	2-06 (12) – 9-09 (36)	Westmeath
(HT: 1-04 – 5-04)
Gls: M Farrell 1, G Shannon 1 Pts: A Darcy 4, K Shannon 4, M Farrell 1		Gls: A Jones 1, L McCartan 1, L Archibold 1, C Blundell 1, K Hegarty 2, V Carr 1, S McCormack 2 Pts: A Jones 1, L McCartan 3, L Archibold 2, K Hegarty 2

Mullahoran, County Cavan
Referee: Declan Carolan (County Down)
Attendance: 0

8th of November
13:00 GMT
Group 2 Rd 2

Louth	4-10 (22) – 2-07 (13)	Longford
(HT: 1-05 – 0-04)
Gls: A Breen 1, E Byrne 1, L Boyle 1, K Flood 1 Pts: C Donnelly 1, A Byrne 1, E Byrne 1, L Boyle 4, K Flood 3		Gls: A Darcy 1, C Lohan 1-0; Pts: G Shannon 1, A Darcy 4, E Heaney 1, L McGuire 1

St. Tiernach's Park, Clones, County Monaghan
Referee: Brendan Rice (County Down)
Attendance: 0

15th of November
13:00 GMT
Group 2 Rd 3

Westmeath	3-11 (20) – 1-05 (8)	Louth
(HT: 1-07 – 0-02)
Gls: L Archibold 1, C Blundell 2 Pts: J Maher 1, R Dillon 1, V Carr 1, L Archibold 3, C Blundell 1, A Jones 1, L Slevin 3		Gls: N Rice 1 Pts: K Flood 1, E Byrne 1, N Rice 1, L Boyle 2

Donaghmore Ashbourne, County Meath
Referee: Barry Redmond (County Wexford)
Attendance: 0

=== Group 3 Table ===
Team	Pld	W	D	L	Group Points	Score Difference
Meath	2	2	0	0	6	+25
Down	2	1	0	1	3	+6
Leitrim	2	0	0	2	0	−31

==== Group 3 Results ====
1st of November
13:00 GMT
Group 3 Rd 1

Meath	0-11 (11) – 1-06 (9)	Down
(HT: 0-8 – 0-0)
Pts: N Gallogly 2, M O'Shaughnessy 1, M Thynne 1, E Duggan 2, S Grimes 4, B Lynch 1		Gls: J Foy 1 Pts: J Foy 5, N Ferris 1

Lannleire GFC, County Louth
Referee: Shane Curley (County Galway)
Attendance: 0

8th of November
13:00 GMT
Group 3 Rd 2

Leitrim	0-10 (10) – 5-18 (33)	Meath
(HT: 0-04 – 3-10)
Pts: L O'Dowd 1, M Devaney 2, L Fox 1, V Egan 1, M Guckian 5		Gls: M Thynne 1, S Grimes 2, B Lynch 2 Pts: M O'Shaughnessy 1, K Byrne 1, M Thynne 1, E Duggan 5, V Wall 1, N O'Sullivan 3, S Grimes 5, B Lynch 1

Mullahoran, County Cavan
Referee: Mel Kenny (County Mayo)
Attendance: 0

15th of November
13:00 GMT
Group 3 Rd 3

Down	3-12 (21) – 1-10 (13)	Leitrim
(HT: 2-06 – 0-07)
Gls: A McCarvill 1, J Foy 1, N Ferris 1 Pts: M Kavanagh 1, A McCarvill 1, O Swail 1, K McKay 2, J Foy 3, N Ferris 4		Gls: R McHugh 1 Pts: L O'Dowd 2, V Egan 2, M Guckian 2, M Devaney 2, R McHugh 2

Inniskeen, County Monaghan
Referee: Garryowen McMahon (County Mayo)
Attendance: 0

=== Group 4 Table ===
Team	Pld	W	D	L	Group Points	Score Difference
Clare	3	2	0	1	6	+44
Kildare	3	2	0	1	6	+24
Laois	3	2	0	1	6	+9
Sligo	3	0	0	3	0	−77

==== Group 4 Results ====
1st of November
13:00 GMT
Group 4 Rd 1

Kildare	2-11 (17) – 1-12 (15)	Clare
(HT: 0-06 – 1-07)
Gls: N Dooley 1, E Dowling 1 Pts: G Clifford 1, L Curran 3, N Dooley 2, R Byrne 0-5		Gls: C Moloney 1 Pts: E O'Connor 1, N O'Dea 1, R Considine 1, G Nolan 1, F Marrinan 2, C Moloney 5, C Blake 1

St. Rynaghs Banagher, County Offaly
Referee: Seamus Mulvihill (County Kerry)
Attendance: 0

1st of November
13:00 GMT
Group 4 Rd 1

Sligo	1-04 (7) – 5-08 (23)	Laois
(HT: 1-02 – 3-05)
Gls: L Boles 1 Pts: L Boles 1, S Regan 1, R O'Brien 2		Gls: E Lawlor 1, R Fitzgerald 1, L Nerney 1, S A Fitzgerald 1, A Moran 1 Pts: M Nerney 3, E Lawlor 1, L Tarpey 2, O Hennessy 2

Kiltoom, County Roscommon
Referee: Mel Kenny (County Mayo)
Attendance: 0

8th of November
13:00 GMT
Group 4 Rd 2

Sligo	0-04 (4) – 5-13 (28)	Kildare
(HT: 0-02 – 4-07)
Pts: C Gilroy 1, S Cunney 1, R O'Brien 1, L Boles 1		Gls: R Byrne 2, N Dooley 1, S O'Sullivan 1, E Burke 1 Pts: L Curran 4, R Byrne 4, N Dooley 2, G Clifford 3

Kinnegad, County Westmeath
Referee: Garryowen McMahon (County Mayo)
Attendance: 0

8th of November
13:00 GMT
Group 4 Rd 2

Clare	5-07 (22) – 1-10 (13)	Laois
(HT: 3-04 – 0-05)
Gls: N O'Dea 2, C Moloney 2, G Nolan 1 Pts: R Considine 1, C Moloney 5, G Nolan 1		Gls: M Nerney 1 Pts: L Tarpey 2, L Nerney 1, M Nerney 6, K Whelan 1, E Lawlor 1

Clonmel, County Tipperary
Referee: Eamonn Moran (County Kerry)
Attendance: 0

15th of November
13:00 GMT
Group 4 Rd 3

Kildare	3-08 (17) – 2-13 (19)	Laois
(HT: 0-03 – 1-08)
Gls: R Byrne 2, N Dooley 1 Pts: L Curran 2, R Byrne 3, N Dooley 2, E Dowling 1		Gls: L Tarpey 1, S A Fitzgerald 1 Pts: E Healy 1, M Nerney 8, E Lawlor 2, S A Fitzgerald 1, R Williams 1

Netwatch Cullen Park, Carlow
Referee: Eamonn Moran (County Kerry)
Attendance: 0

15th of November
13:00 GMT
Group 4 Rd 3

Clare	7-18 (39) – 0-02 (2)	Sligo
(HT: 5-05 – 0-02)
Gls: N O'Dea 2, G Nolan 2, A Sexton 3 Pts: C Harvey 1, N O'Dea 2, C Moloney 2, G Nolan 7, F Marrinan 4, T Kelly 1, E Keane 1		Pts: L Kelly 1, R O'Brien 1

St. Jarlath's Park, Tuam, County Galway
Referee: John Devlin (County Galway)
Attendance: 0

== All-Ireland Semi-Finals ==
TG4

28th of November 2020
13:30 GMT
Semi-Final 2

Report

Clare	0-04 (4) – 4-13 (25)	Meath
(HT: 0-04 – 2-06)
Pts: N O'Dea 1, G Nolan 3		Gls: N O'Sullivan 1-0, S Grimes 2, B Lynch 1 Pts: E Troy 1, V Wall 1, S Grimes 6, M Thynne 1, E Duggan 1, M O'Shaughnessy 1, E White 1

O'Moore Park, Laois
Referee: Shane Curley (Galway)
Attendance: 0

TG4

29th of November 2020
13:00 GMT
Semi-Final 1

Report

Roscommon	0-13 (13) – 2-09 (15)	Westmeath
(HT: 0-08 – 2-06)
Pts: L Fleming 1, A O'Connor 2, J Cregg 1, J Higgins 1, N McHugh 1		Gls: C Blundell 1, K Hegarty 1 Pts: C Blundell 2, J Maher 1, L Archibold 4, K Hegarty 1, L Slevin 1

Pearse Park, Longford
Referee: John Devlin (Galway)
Attendance: 0

== All Ireland Intermediate Final ==
TG4

20th of December 2020
13:15 GMT
Final

Report

Meath	2-17 (23) – 4-05 (17)	Westmeath
(HT: 2-08 – 3-03)
Gls: V Wall 1, B Lynch 1 Pts: E Duggan 7 (5f), V Wall 3, S Grimes 3 (3f), E Troy 1, M O’Shaughnessy 1, N O’Sullivan 1, A Leahy 1		Gls: A Jones 1, L McCartan 2, L Archibold 1 (1 pen); Pts: A Jones 5 (4f)

Croke Park, Dublin
Referee: Seamus Mulvihill (Kerry)
Attendance: 0

== Awards ==
=== TG4 Intermediate Players’ Player of the Year ===
Vikki Wall Meath

=== Intermediate Team of the Championship ===
No.	Position	Player	Team	Flag
1	Goalkeeper	Monica McGuirk	Meath	
2	Right corner back	Rachel Dillon	Westmeath	
3	Full back	Lucy Power	Westmeath	
4	Left corner back	Emma Troy	Meath	
5	Right half back	Róisín Considine	Clare	
6	Centre half back	Fiona Claffey	Westmeath	
7	Left half back	Megan Thynne	Meath	
8	Midfield	Jennifer Higgins	Roscommon	
9	Midfield	Máire O’Shaughnessy	Meath	
10	Right half forward	Emma Duggan	Meath	
11	Centre half forward	Vikki Wall	Meath	
12	Left half forward	Anna Jones	Westmeath	
13	Right corner forward	Stacey Grimes	Meath	
14	Full forward	Niamh O'Dea	Clare	
15	Left corner forward	Róisín Byrne	Kildare	

== Season Statistics ==
Scoring list
No.	Name	Team	Flag	Goals	Points	Total points
1	Stacey Grimes	Meath		4	18	30
2	Róisín Byrne	Kildare		4	12	24
3	Chloe Moloney	Clare		3	12	21
	Gráinne Nolan	Clare		3	12	21
4	Mo Nerney	Laois		1	17	20
5	Leona Archibold	Westmeath		3	9	18
6	Niamh O'Dea	Clare		4	4	16
7	Ciara Blundell	Westmeath		4	3	15
	Emma Duggan	Meath		0	15	15
	Aimee O'Connor	Roscommon		1	12	15
	Neasa Dooley	Kildare		3	6	15
	Catriona Murray	Wexford		2	9	15
8	Bridgetta Lynch	Meath		4	2	14
	Laura Fleming	Roscommon		0	14	14
	Jessica Foy	Down		2	8	14
9	Anna Jones	Westmeath		2	7	13
10	Karen Hegarty	Westmeath		3	3	12
	Lucy McCartan	Westmeath		3	3	12
11	Aoife Darcy	Longford		1	8	11
12	Sinead Glennon	Roscommon		3	1	10
13	Amy Sexton	Clare		3	0	9
	Lara Curran	Kildare		0	9	9
	Lauren Boyle	Louth		1	6	9
14	Gráinne Egan	Offaly		1	5	8
	Natasha Ferris	Down		1	5	8
	Vikki Wall	Meath		1	5	8
15	Kate Kenny	Offaly		1	4	7
	Niamh O'Sullivan	Meath		1	4	7
	Leah Tarpey	Laois		1	4	7
	Kate Flood	Louth		1	4	7
	Emma Lawlor	Laois		1	4	7
	Michelle Guckian	Leitrim		0	7	7
	Sarah Anne Fitzgerald	Laois		2	1	7
	Aishling Murphy	Wexford		2	1	7
16	Fidelma Marrinan	Clare		0	6	6
	Megan Thynne	Meath		1	3	6
	Sarah McCormack	Westmeath		2	0	6
17	Eimear Byrne	Louth		1	2	5
	Roisin McHugh	Leitrim		1	2	5
	Bernie Breen	Wexford		1	2	5
	Lauren Boles	Sligo		1	2	5
	Joanne Cregg	Roscommon		1	2	5
	Ellie McEvoy	Offaly		1	2	5
	Leanne Slevin	Westmeath		0	5	5
	Aoife Gavin	Roscommon		0	5	5
18	Laura Nerney	Laois		1	1	4
	Grace Shannon	Longford		1	1	4
	Marie Byrne	Offaly		1	1	4
	Ellen Dowling	Kildare		1	1	4
	Muireann Devaney	Leitrim		0	4	4
	Aoibheann McCarvill	Down		1	1	4
	Niamh Rice	Louth		1	1	4
	Vicky Carr	Westmeath		1	1	4
	Michelle Farrell	Longford		1	1	4
	Rachel O'Brien	Sligo		0	4	4
	Grace Clifford	Kildare		0	4	4
	Máire O'Shaughnessy	Meath		0	4	4
19	Lisa O'Rourke	Roscommon		1	0	3
	Rachel Fitzgerald	Laois		1	0	3
	Andrea Moran	Laois		1	0	3
	Chloe Sheridan	Offaly		1	0	3
	Erica Burke	Kildare		1	0	3
	Siobhan O'Sullivan	Kildare		1	0	3
	Clodagh Lohan	Longford		1	0	3
	Vivienne Egan	Leitrim		0	3	3
	Ciara Banville	Wexford		0	3	3
	Laura O'Dowd	Leitrim		0	3	3
	Aine Breen	Louth		1	0	3
20	Johanna Maher	Westmeath		0	2	2
	Shereen Hamilton	Wexford		0	2	2
	Roisin Considine	Clare		0	2	2
	Kate McKay	Down		0	2	2
	Niamh Gallogly	Meath		0	2	2
	Emma Troy	Meath		0	2	2
	Orla Hennessy	Laois		0	2	2
21	Sarah Harding Kenny	Wexford		0	1	1
	Ellen Healy	Laois		0	1	1
	Claire Donnelly	Louth		0	1	1
	Louise Brady	Roscommon		0	1	1
	Sarah Cunney	Sligo		0	1	1
	Natalie McHugh	Roscommon		0	1	1
	Tara Kelly	Clare		0	1	1
	Lauren McGuire	Longford		0	1	1
	Emer Heaney	Longford		0	1	1
	Jenny Higgins	Roscommon		0	1	1
	Mairead Kavanagh	Down		0	1	1
	Eimear Keane	Clare		0	1	1
	Ciara Gilroy	Sligo		0	1	1
	Cliodhna Blake	Clare		0	1	1
	Orla Swail	Down		0	1	1
	Shauna Fleming	Roscommon		0	1	1
	Sinéad Regan	Sligo		0	1	1
	Rachel Dillon	Westmeath		0	1	1
	Claire Donnelly	Louth		0	1	1
	Caoimhe Harvey	Clare		0	1	1
	Aoibheann Leahy	Meath		0	1	1
	Rachel Williams	Laois		0	1	1
	Aoife Byrne	Louth		0	1	1
	Kate Whelan	Laois		0	1	1
	Leah Fox	Leitrim		0	1	1
	Kara Shannon	Longford		0	1	1
	Emma White	Meath		0	1	1
	Amy Wilson	Wexford		0	1	1
	Leahy Kelly	Sligo		0	1	1
	Eimear O'Connor	Clare		0	1	1

Season Statistics Breakdown
Teams	Total score	Games	Points per game average	Goals	Points	First half (total score)	Average points (first half)	Second half (total score)	Average points (second half)	Clean sheets (goals)	No. of scoring players in season
Clare	80	4	20	13	41	47	11.75	33	8.25	1	11
Down	30	2	15	4	18	12	6	18	9	1	11
Kildare	62	3	20.67	10	32	28	9.33	34	11.33	1	7
Laois	56	3	18.67	8	32	30	10	26	8.67	0	11
Leitrim	23	2	11.5	1	20	11	5.5	12	6	0	5
Longford	32	2	16	4	13	11	5.5	21	10.5	0	7
Louth	30	2	15	5	15	10	5	20	10	0	7
Meath	92	4	23	11	59	53	13.25	39	9.75	2	12
Offaly	27	2	13.5	5	12	16	8	11	5.5	0	5
Roscommon	46	3	15.3	3	37	34	11.33	12	4	0	10
Sligo	13	3	4.33	1	10	9	3	4	1.33	0	6
Westmeath	88	4	22	18	34	53	13.25	35	8.75	1	10
Wexford	34	2	17	5	19	21	10.5	13	6.5	0	7

== See also ==
- 2020 All-Ireland Senior Ladies' Football Championship
- 2020 All-Ireland Junior Ladies' Football Championship
- All-Ireland Intermediate Ladies' Football Championship
