= 2020 Ladies' National Football League =

Planned ladies' Gaelic football competition, Ireland

League details
- Dates: 25 January – 8 March 2020 (not completed)
- Teams: 31

League champions

The 2020 Ladies' National Football League, known for sponsorship reasons as the Lidl Ladies' National Football League, was a ladies' Gaelic football competition taking place in early 2020.

The league was originally scheduled to end in April 2020, but public health measures introduced to combat the COVID-19 pandemic in Ireland caused the competition to be cancelled in March 2020, and the leagues declared null and void.

== Format ==
=== League structure ===
The 2020 Ladies' National Football League consists of three divisions of eight teams and one of seven. Each team plays every other team in its division once. 3 points are awarded for a win and 1 for a draw.

Teams by Province
Province	Division 1	Division 2	Division 3	Division 4
Connacht	2	0	2	1
Leinster	2	2	4	4
Munster	3	2	0	1
Ulster	1	4	2	2

If two teams are level on points, the tie-break is:

- winners of the head-to-head game are ranked ahead
- if the head-to-head match was a draw, then whichever team scored more points in the game is ranked ahead (e.g. 1-15 beats 2-12)
- if the head-to-head match was an exact draw, ranking is determined by the points difference (i.e. total scored minus total conceded in all games)
- if the points difference is equal, ranking is determined by the total scored

If three or more teams are level on league points, rankings are determined solely by points difference.

=== Finals, promotions and relegations ===
The top two teams in Division 1 contest the Ladies' National Football League final.

The top two teams in divisions 2, 3 and 4 contest the finals of their respective divisions. The division champions are promoted.

The last-placed teams in divisions 1, 2 and 3 are relegated.

== Division 1 ==
=== Table ===
Pos	Team	Pld	W	D	L	PF	PA	PD	Pts	Qualification or relegation
1	Galway	5	4	0	1	98	59	+39	12	Advance to LNFL Final
2	Cork	5	4	0	1	60	41	+19	12	Advance to LNFL Final
3	Mayo	5	3	0	2	49	50	−1	9	
4	Dublin	5	2	1	2	58	56	+2	7	
5	Donegal	5	2	0	3	70	76	−6	6	
6	Tipperary	5	1	2	2	44	61	−17	5	
7	Waterford	5	1	1	3	58	67	−9	4	
8	Westmeath	5	1	0	4	42	69	−27	3	Relegation to Division 2

Updated to match(es) played on 8 March 2020. Source: ladiesgaelic.ie

=== Final ===
18/19 April 2020
Cancelled
LNFL Final

v

== Division 2 ==
=== Table ===
Pos	Team	Pld	W	D	L	PF	PA	PD	Pts	Qualification or relegation
1	Kerry	5	5	0	0	110	65	+45	15	Advance to Final
2	Meath	5	3	1	1	92	75	+17	10	Advance to Final
3	Cavan	5	3	0	2	101	65	+36	9	
4	Monaghan	5	3	0	2	100	70	+30	9	
5	Tyrone	5	3	0	2	85	71	+14	9	
6	Armagh	5	2	0	3	98	74	+24	6	
7	Clare	5	0	1	4	67	97	−30	1	
8	Wexford	5	0	0	5	31	167	−136	0	Relegation to Division 3

Updated to match(es) played on 8 March 2020. Source: ladiesgaelic.ie

=== Final ===
18/19 April 2020
Cancelled
Final

v

== Division 3 ==
=== Table ===
Pos	Team	Pld	W	D	L	PF	PA	PD	Pts	Qualification or relegation
1	Kildare	5	5	0	0	92	59	+33	15	Advance to Final
2	Down	5	4	1	0	93	55	+38	13	Advance to Final
3	Roscommon	5	3	0	2	83	75	+8	9	
4	Laois	5	2	1	2	85	94	−9	7	
5	Wicklow	5	1	3	1	84	66	+18	6	
6	Longford	5	1	1	3	50	62	−12	4	
7	Fermanagh	5	1	0	4	59	85	−26	3	
8	Sligo	5	0	0	5	59	109	−50	0	Relegation to Division 4

Updated to match(es) played on 8 March 2020. Source: ladiesgaelic.ie

=== Final ===
18/19 April 2020
Cancelled
Final

v

, Cancelled

== Division 4 ==
=== Table ===
Pos	Team	Pld	W	D	L	PF	PA	PD	Pts	Qualification or relegation
1	Louth	4	4	0	0	74	37	+37	12	Advance to Final
2	Carlow	4	3	1	0	82	48	+34	10	Advance to Final
3	Leitrim	4	3	0	1	104	31	+73	9	
4	Offaly	4	2	2	0	69	56	+13	8	
5	Limerick	5	1	1	3	78	74	+4	4	
6	Antrim	4	0	0	4	35	95	−60	0	
7	Derry	5	0	0	5	23	124	−101	0	

Updated to match(es) played on 8 March 2020. Source: ladiesgaelic.ie

=== Final ===
18/19 April 2020
Cancelled
Final

v
