= 2024 Ladies' National Football League =

Ladies' Gaelic football competition, Ireland

League details
- Dates: 14 January – 7 April, 2024
- Teams: 32

League champions
- Winners: Armagh (1st win)
- Captain: Clodagh McCambridge
- Manager: Greg McGonigle

League runners-up
- Runners-up: Kerry
- Captain: Niamh Carmody
- Manager: Declan Quill

Other division winners
- Division 2: Kildare
- Division 3: Clare
- Division 4: Carlow

The 2024 Ladies' National Football League, known for sponsorship reasons as the Lidl Ladies' National Football League, is a ladies' Gaelic football competition taking place in early 2024.

Armagh won the competition for the first time.

== League structure ==
The 2024 Ladies' National Football League consists of four divisions of eight teams, Each team plays every other team in its division once, either home or away. 3 points are awarded for a win and 1 for a draw.

Teams by Province
| Province | Division 1 | Division 2 | Division 3 | Division 4 | Total |
|---|---|---|---|---|---|
| Connacht | 2 | 0 | 2 | 1 | 5 |
| Leinster | 2 | 3 | 3 | 4 | 12 |
| Munster | 3 | 1 | 1 | 1 | 6 |
| Ulster | 1 | 4 | 2 | 2 | 9 |
| Totals | 8 | 8 | 8 | 8 | 32 |

== Tiebreakers for league ranking ==
If two teams are level on points, the tie-break is:

- winners of the head-to-head game are ranked ahead
- if the head-to-head match was a draw, then whichever team scored more points in the game is ranked ahead (e.g. 1-15 beats 2–12)
- if the head-to-head match was an exact draw, ranking is determined by the points difference (i.e. total scored minus total conceded in all games)
- if the points difference is equal, ranking is determined by the total scored

If three or more teams are level on league points, rankings are determined solely by points difference.

== Finals, promotion and relegation ==
The top two teams in Division 1 contest the Ladies' National Football League final.

The top two teams in Divisions 2 and 3 contest the respective division finals and are promoted.

The bottom two teams in divisions 1, 2 and 3 are relegated.

The top four teams in Divisions 4 contest the division semi-finals and final; the two division finalists are promoted.

== Division 1 ==
Locations of the 2024 LNFL Division 1 teams.

=== Table ===
| Pos | Team | Pld | W | D | L | PF | PA | PD | Pts | Qualification |
|---|---|---|---|---|---|---|---|---|---|---|
| 1 | Armagh | 7 | 6 | 0 | 1 | 96 | 93 | +3 | 18 | Advance to LNFL final |
| 2 | Kerry | 7 | 5 | 1 | 1 | 107 | 72 | +35 | 16 | Advance to LNFL final |
| 3 | Dublin | 7 | 5 | 0 | 2 | 114 | 77 | +37 | 15 | |
| 4 | Meath | 7 | 4 | 0 | 3 | 91 | 97 | −6 | 12 | |
| 5 | Mayo | 7 | 3 | 1 | 3 | 89 | 97 | −8 | 10 | |
| 6 | Waterford | 7 | 2 | 0 | 5 | 85 | 96 | −11 | 6 | |
| 7 | Cork | 7 | 1 | 0 | 6 | 57 | 100 | −43 | 3 | Relegated to Division 2 |
| 8 | Galway | 7 | 1 | 0 | 6 | 72 | 79 | −7 | 3 | Relegated to Division 2 |

Source: ladiesgaelic.ie
Rules for classification: Tiebreakers

=== Division 1 Final ===
7 April 2024
15:00 IST (UTC+1)
LNFL Final

Report

| Armagh | 2-12 (18) – (15) 2-09 | Kerry |
|---|---|---|
(HT: 1-4 – 1-4)

Croke Park, Dublin
Referee: Gus Chapman (Sligo)

== Division 2 ==
=== Table ===
| Pos | Team | Pld | W | D | L | PF | PA | PD | Pts | Qualification |
|---|---|---|---|---|---|---|---|---|---|---|
| 1 | Kildare | 7 | 6 | 1 | 0 | 98 | 53 | +45 | 19 | Advance to Division 2 final and promoted to Division 1 |
| 2 | Tyrone | 7 | 5 | 2 | 0 | 107 | 84 | +23 | 17 | Advance to Division 2 final and promoted to Division 1 |
| 3 | Donegal | 7 | 4 | 1 | 2 | 103 | 74 | +29 | 13 | |
| 4 | Westmeath | 7 | 3 | 0 | 4 | 86 | 86 | 0 | 9 | |
| 5 | Tipperary | 7 | 3 | 0 | 4 | 75 | 56 | +19 | 9 | |
| 6 | Monaghan | 7 | 2 | 1 | 4 | 102 | 100 | +2 | 7 | |
| 7 | Cavan | 7 | 2 | 0 | 5 | 44 | 99 | −55 | 6 | Relegated to Division 3 |
| 8 | Laois | 7 | 0 | 1 | 6 | 50 | 113 | −63 | 1 | Relegated to Division 3 |

Source: ladiesgaelic.ie
Rules for classification: Tiebreakers

=== Division 2 Final ===
7 April 2024
13:00 IST (UTC+1)
Final

Report

| Kildare | 2-09 (15) – (12) 0-12 | Tyrone |

Croke Park, Dublin

== Division 3 ==
=== Table ===
| Pos | Team | Pld | W | D | L | PF | PA | PD | Pts | Qualification |
|---|---|---|---|---|---|---|---|---|---|---|
| 1 | Roscommon | 7 | 6 | 1 | 0 | 100 | 66 | +34 | 19 | Advance to Division 3 final and promoted to Division 2 |
| 2 | Clare | 7 | 5 | 1 | 1 | 115 | 60 | +55 | 16 | Advance to Division 3 final and promoted to Division 2 |
| 3 | Down | 7 | 5 | 0 | 2 | 91 | 69 | +22 | 15 | |
| 4 | Offaly | 7 | 3 | 1 | 3 | 90 | 91 | −1 | 10 | |
| 5 | Wexford | 7 | 3 | 1 | 3 | 59 | 70 | −11 | 10 | |
| 6 | Louth | 7 | 2 | 1 | 4 | 87 | 104 | −17 | 7 | |
| 7 | Antrim | 7 | 1 | 0 | 6 | 87 | 129 | −42 | 3 | Relegated to Division 4 |
| 8 | Sligo | 7 | 0 | 1 | 6 | 79 | 119 | −40 | 1 | Relegated to Division 4 |

Source: ladiesgaelic.ie
Rules for classification: Tiebreakers

=== Division 3 Final ===
TG4

6 April 2024
16:00 IST (UTC+1)
Final

Report

| Clare | 1-06 (9) – (7) 1-04 | Roscommon |

Grant Heating St Brendan's Park, Birr
Referee: Barry Redmond

== Division 4 ==
=== Table ===
| Pos | Team | Pld | W | D | L | PF | PA | PD | Pts | Qualification |
|---|---|---|---|---|---|---|---|---|---|---|
| 1 | Fermanagh | 7 | 6 | 1 | 0 | 137 | 69 | +68 | 19 | Advance to Division 4 semi-finals; division finalists are promoted to Division 3 |
| 2 | Leitrim | 7 | 6 | 0 | 1 | 162 | 78 | +84 | 18 | Advance to Division 4 semi-finals; division finalists are promoted to Division 3 |
| 3 | Limerick (Note: Limerick are ranked ahead of Carlow because they won the head-to-head game between the teams.) (P) | 7 | 3 | 2 | 2 | 70 | 62 | +8 | 11 | Advance to Division 4 semi-finals; division finalists are promoted to Division 3 |
| 4 | Carlow (P) | 7 | 3 | 2 | 2 | 107 | 84 | +23 | 11 | Advance to Division 4 semi-finals; division finalists are promoted to Division 3 |
| 5 | Wicklow | 7 | 3 | 1 | 3 | 96 | 95 | +1 | 10 | |
| 6 | Longford | 7 | 2 | 2 | 3 | 111 | 122 | −11 | 8 | |
| 7 | Derry | 7 | 1 | 0 | 6 | 84 | 117 | −33 | 3 | |
| 8 | Kilkenny | 7 | 0 | 0 | 7 | 30 | 170 | −140 | 0 | |

Source: ladiesgaelic.ie
Rules for classification: Tiebreakers
(P) Promoted

=== Division 4 Finals ===
24 March 2024
13:00 IWT (UTC±0)
Semi-Final

| Leitrim | 1-11 (14) – (16) 2-10 | Limerick |

Pádraig Pearse's GAA, Ballymacward

24 March 2024
14:00 IWT (UTC±0)
Semi-Final

| Fermanagh | 1-10 (13) – (14) 2-08 | Carlow |

Dowdallshill, Dundalk
Referee: Ciaran Groome

TG4

6 April 2024
14:00 IST (UTC+1)
Division 4 Final

Report

| Limerick | 0-06 (6) – (10) 1-07 | Carlow |

Grant Heating St Brendan's Park, Birr
Referee: Declan Carolan
