= Ladies' National Football League =

Gaelic football competition in Ireland

- Current season or competition: 2026 Ladies' National Football League
- Irish: Sraith Náisiúnta Peile na mBan
- Founded: 1979–80
- No. of teams: 32
- Title holders: Cork (13th title)
- Most titles: Cork/Kerry (13 titles)
- Sponsors: Lidl
- TV partner(s): TG4 (live games); RTÉ2 (highlights)

The Ladies' National Football League is an annual inter-county ladies' Gaelic football tournament, secondary to the All-Ireland Senior Ladies' Football Championship. It is competed for annually by the county teams of Ireland. Kerry has won the title 13 times.

== National League roll of honour ==
| County | Winners | Runners-up | Years | Years |
|---|---|---|---|---|
| Cork | 13 | 4 | 2005, 2006, 2008, 2009, 2010, 2011, 2013, 2014, 2015, 2016, 2017, 2019, 2026 | 1993, 2004, 2012, 2021 |
| Kerry | 13 | 3 | 1979–80, 1980–81, 1982, 1983, 1984, 1985, 1987, 1988, 1989, 1990, 1991, 2023, 2025 | 2003, 2008, 2024 |
| Waterford | 5 | 5 | 1992, 1995, 1997, 1998, 2002 | 1988, 1989, 1990, 1991, 1999 |
| Monaghan | 4 | 1 | 1994, 1996, 1999, 2012 | 2001 |
| Mayo | 3 | 7 | 2000, 2004, 2007 | 1994, 1995, 1996, 2002, 2009, 2013, 2016, 2018 |
| Laois | 2 | 5 | 1993, 2003 | 1984, 1986, 1987, 1992, 2011 |
| Dublin | 2 | 1 | 2018, 2021 | 2014 |
| Tipperary | 1 | 2 | 1979 | 1980-81, 1982 |
| Clare | 1 | 2 | 2001 | 1997, 1998 |
| Meath | 1 | 1 | 2022 | 2006 |
| Armagh | 1 | 1 | 2024 | 2025 |
| Wexford | 1 | 0 | 1986 | - |
| Galway | 0 | 8 | - | 1979, 2005, 2007, 2010, 2015, 2019, 2023, 2026 |
| Leitrim | 0 | 2 | - | 1983, 1985 |
| Donegal | 0 | 2 | - | 2017, 2022 |
| Offaly | 0 | 1 | - | 1979-80 |
| Tyrone | 0 | 1 | - | 2000 |

The tournament was unfinished in 2020.

== Finals ==
| Year | Winner | Score | Opponent | Score |
|---|---|---|---|---|
| 2026 | Cork | 2-08 | Galway | 0-09 |
| 2025 | Kerry | 4-14 | Armagh | 0-11 |
| 2024 | Armagh | 2-12 | Kerry | 2-09 |
| 2023 | Kerry | 5–11 | Galway | 1-10 |
| 2022 | Meath | 2–08 | Donegal | 1-09 |
| 2021 | Dublin | 2–15 | Cork | 1-13 |
| 2020 | Competition unfinished due to the COVID-19 pandemic | | | |
| 2019 | Cork | 1–12 | Galway | 2–07 |
| 2018 | Dublin | 3–15 | Mayo | 1-10 |
| 2017 | Cork | 2–15 | Donegal | 2–14 |
| 2016 | Cork | 1–10 | Mayo | 0–10 |
| 2015 (R) | Cork | 0–14 | Galway | 1–10 |
| 2014 | Cork | 1–9 | Dublin | 2–4 |
| 2013 | Cork | | Mayo | |
| 2012 | Monaghan | | Cork | |
| 2011 | Cork | | Laois | |
| 2010 | Cork | | Galway | |
| 2009 | Cork | | Mayo | |
| 2008 | Cork | | Kerry | |
| 2007 | Mayo | | Galway | |
| 2006 | Cork | | Meath | |
| 2005 | Cork | | Galway | |
| 2004 | Mayo | | Cork | |
| 2003 | Laois | | Kerry | |
| 2002 | Waterford | | Mayo | |
| 2001 | Clare | | Monaghan | |
| 2000 | Mayo | | Tyrone | |
| 1999 | Monaghan | | Waterford | |
| 1998 | Waterford | | Clare | |
| 1997 | Waterford | | Clare | |
| 1996 | Monaghan | | Mayo | |
| 1995 | Waterford | | Mayo | |
| 1994 | Monaghan | | Mayo | |
| 1993 | Laois | | Cork | |
| 1992 | Waterford | | Laois | |
| 1991 | Kerry | | Waterford | |
| 1990 | Kerry | | Waterford | |
| 1989 | Kerry | | Waterford | |
| 1988 | Kerry | | Waterford | |
| 1987 | Kerry | | Laois | |
| 1986 | Wexford | | Laois | |
| 1985 | Kerry | | Leitrim | |
| 1984 | Kerry | | Laois | |
| 1983 | Kerry | | Leitrim | |
| 1982 | Kerry | | Tipperary | |
| 1981 | Kerry | | Tipperary | |
| 1980 | Kerry | 4-09 | Offaly | 3-06 |
| 1979 | Tipperary | 2-04 | Galway | 2-03 |
