= 2022 Ladies' National Football League =

Planned ladies' Gaelic football competition, Ireland

League details
- Dates: 13 February – 10 April 2022
- Teams: 32

League champions
- Winners: Meath (1st win)
- Captain: Shauna Ennis
- Manager: Eamonn Murray

League runners-up
- Runners-up: Donegal
- Captain: Niamh McLaughlin
- Manager: Maxi Curran

Other division winners
- Division 2: Kerry
- Division 3: Roscommon
- Division 4: Offaly

The 2022 Ladies' National Football League, known for sponsorship reasons as the Lidl Ladies' National Football League, is a ladies' Gaelic football competition taking place in spring 2022.

It continued the structure of 2021, where the divisions were split into north and south sections. London will return to the league after several years' absence.

Meath were the winners.

== League structure ==
The 2022 Ladies' National Football League consists of four divisions of eight teams. Each division is divided into an "A" and "B" section with four teams in each section. Each team plays every other team in its section once. 3 points are awarded for a win and 1 for a draw.

Teams by Province
Province	Division 1	Division 2	Division 3	Division 4	Total
Connacht	2	0	2	1	5
Leinster	3	1	5	2	11
Munster	2	3	0	1	6
Ulster	1	4	1	3	9
Britain	0	0	0	1	1
Total	8	8	8	8	32

== Tiebreakers for league ranking ==
If two teams are level on points, the tie-break is:

- winners of the head-to-head game are ranked ahead
- if the head-to-head match was a draw, then whichever team scored more points in the game is ranked ahead (e.g. 1-15 beats 2–12)
- if the head-to-head match was an exact draw, ranking is determined by the points difference (i.e. total scored minus total conceded in all games)
- if the points difference is equal, ranking is determined by the total scored

If three or more teams are level on league points, rankings are determined solely by points difference.

== Finals, promotions and relegations ==
The top two teams in each section in Division 1 contest the Ladies' National Football League semi-finals.

The top two teams in each section in divisions 2, 3 and 4 contest the semi-finals of their respective divisions. The division champions are promoted.

The last-placed teams in each section in divisions 1, 2 and 3 play a relegation playoff against each other, with the losers relegated.

== Division 1 ==
Locations of the 2022 LNFL Division 1 teams.
Red: 1A; Green: 1B.

=== Division 1A ===
==== Table ====
Pos	Team	Pld	W	D	L	PF	PA	PD	Pts	Qualification
1	Mayo	3	3	0	0	80	39	+41	9	Advance to LNFL semi-finals
2	Donegal	3	2	0	1	37	32	+5	6	Advance to LNFL semi-finals
3	Galway	3	1	0	2	43	41	+2	3	
4	Westmeath (R)	3	0	0	3	34	82	−48	0	Advance to relegation playoff; losers are relegated to Division 2

Updated to match(es) played on 6 March 2022. Source: ladiesgaelic.ie
Rules for classification: Tiebreakers
(R) Relegated

=== Division 1B ===
==== Table ====
Pos	Team	Pld	W	D	L	PF	PA	PD	Pts	Qualification
1	Dublin	3	3	0	0	52	27	+25	9	Advance to LNFL semi-finals
2	Meath (C)	3	2	0	1	37	28	+9	6	Advance to LNFL semi-finals
3	Cork	3	1	0	2	37	48	−11	3	
4	Waterford	3	0	0	3	26	49	−23	0	Advance to Division 1 relegation playoff; losers are relegated to Division 2

Updated to match(es) played on 6 March 2022. Source: ladiesgaelic.ie
Rules for classification: Tiebreakers
(C) League champions

=== Division 1 Relegation Playoff ===
13 March 2022
14:00 GMT (UTC±0)
Relegation playoff

Waterford	1-17 (20) – (7) 0-07	Westmeath

Abbotstown 3G Pitch, Abbotstown
Referee: Declan Carolan

=== Division 1 Finals ===
19 March 2022
13:00 GMT (UTC±0)
Semi-Final

Donegal	2-08 (14) – (13) 1-10	Dublin

St Tiernach's Park, Clones
Referee: Gus Chapman

19 March 2022
15:00 GMT (UTC±0)
Semi-Final

Mayo	1-09 (12) – (18) 2-12	Meath

St Tiernach's Park, Clones
Referee: Siobhan Coyle

TG4

10 April 2022
16:00 IST (UTC+1)
LNFL Final

Report

Donegal	1-09 (12) – (14) 2-08	Meath
(HT: 1-05 – 1-06)

Croke Park, Dublin
Referee: Garryowen McMahon

== Division 2 ==
=== Division 2A ===
==== Table ====
Pos	Team	Pld	W	D	L	PF	PA	PD	Pts	Qualification
1	Kerry (P)	3	3	0	0	56	28	+28	9	Advance to Division 2 semi-finals; division winners are promoted to Division 1
2	Laois	3	2	0	1	44	54	−10	6	Advance to Division 2 semi-finals; division winners are promoted to Division 1
3	Tipperary	3	1	0	2	32	35	−3	3	
4	Clare (R)	3	0	0	3	32	47	−15	0	Advance to Division 2 relegation playoff; losers are relegated to Division 3

Updated to match(es) played on 6 March 2022. Source: ladiesgaelic.ie
Rules for classification: Tiebreakers
(P) Promoted; (R) Relegated

=== Division 2B ===
==== Table ====
Pos	Team	Pld	W	D	L	PF	PA	PD	Pts	Qualification
1	Armagh	3	3	0	0	56	29	+27	9	Advance to Division 2 semi-finals; division winners are promoted to Division 1
2	Monaghan	3	1	1	1	26	32	−6	4	Advance to Division 2 semi-finals; division winners are promoted to Division 1
3	Cavan	3	1	0	2	39	44	−5	3	
4	Tyrone	3	0	1	2	38	54	−16	1	Advance to Division 2 relegation playoff; losers are relegated to Division 3

Updated to match(es) played on 6 March 2022. Source: ladiesgaelic.ie
Rules for classification: Tiebreakers

=== Division 2 Relegation Playoff ===
3 April 2022
14:00 IST (UTC+1)
Relegation playoff

Clare	1-15 (18) – (26) 3-17	Tyrone

Glennon Brothers Pearse Park, Longford
Referee: Paul Burke

=== Division 2 Finals ===
19 March 2022
14:00 GMT (UTC±0)
Semi-Final

Armagh	7-18 (39) – (12) 1-09	Laois

O'Raghallaigh Park, Kingscourt
Referee: Jonathan Murphy

20 March 2022
14:00 GMT (UTC±0)
Semi-Final

Kerry	1-14 (17) – (14) 1-11	Monaghan

Tuam Stadium, Tuam
Referee: Kevin Corcoran

10 April 2022
16:00 IST (UTC+1)
Division 2 Final

Armagh	0-12 (12) – (15) 1-12	Kerry

Croke Park, Dublin
Referee: Jonathan Murphy

== Division 3 ==
=== Division 3A ===
==== Table ====
Pos	Team	Pld	W	D	L	PF	PA	PD	Pts	Qualification
1	Down	3	2	1	0	51	46	+5	7	Advance to Division 3 semi-finals; Division winners are promoted to Division 2
2	Roscommon (P)	3	2	0	1	43	49	−6	6	Advance to Division 3 semi-finals; Division winners are promoted to Division 2
3	Sligo	3	1	0	2	53	47	+6	3	
4	Louth	3	0	1	2	33	38	−5	1	Advance to a relegation playoff; losers are relegated to Division 4

Updated to match(es) played on 6 March 2022. Source: ladiesgaelic.ie
Rules for classification: Tiebreakers
(P) Promoted

=== Division 3B ===
==== Table ====
Pos	Team	Pld	W	D	L	PF	PA	PD	Pts	Qualification
1	Kildare	3	2	1	0	54	36	+18	7	Advance to Division 3 semi-finals; division winners are promoted to Division 2
2	Wexford	3	1	1	1	28	39	−11	4	Advance to Division 3 semi-finals; division winners are promoted to Division 2
3	Longford	3	1	0	2	45	46	−1	3	
4	Wicklow (R)	3	0	2	1	38	44	−6	2	Advance to a relegation playoff; losers are relegated to Division 4

Updated to match(es) played on 6 March 2022. Source: ladiesgaelic.ie
Rules for classification: Tiebreakers
(R) Relegated

=== Division 3 Relegation Playoff ===
13 March 2022
13:00 GMT (UTC±0)
Relegation playoff

Louth	2-07 (13) – (5) 0-05	Wicklow

Abbotstown Pitch 1, Abbotstown
Referee: Patrick Smith

=== Division 3 Finals ===
20 March 2022
13:00 GMT (UTC±0)
Semi-Final

Kildare	1-16 (19) – (21) 4-09	Roscommon

Parnell Park, Donnycarney
Referee: Gavin Finnegan

20 March 2022
15:00 GMT (UTC±0)
Semi-Final

Down	3-07 (16) – (24) 4-12	Wexford

Parnell Park, Donnycarney
Referee: Angela Gallagher

3 April 2022
16:00 IST (UTC+1)
Division 3 Final

Roscommon	1-06 (9) – (8) 0-08	Wexford

St Brendan's Park, Birr
Referee: Gavin Finnegan

== Division 4 ==
=== Division 4A ===
==== Table ====
Pos	Team	Pld	W	D	L	PF	PA	PD	Pts	Qualification
1	Leitrim	3	2	1	0	57	31	+26	7	Advance to Division 4 semi-finals; division champions are promoted to Division 3
2	Fermanagh	3	2	0	1	55	51	+4	6	Advance to Division 4 semi-finals; division champions are promoted to Division 3
3	Antrim	3	1	1	1	54	46	+8	4	
4	Derry	3	0	0	3	22	60	−38	0	

Updated to match(es) played on 6 March 2022. Source: ladiesgaelic.ie
Rules for classification: Tiebreakers

=== Division 4B ===
==== Table ====
Pos	Team	Pld	W	D	L	PF	PA	PD	Pts	Qualification
1	Limerick	3	3	0	0	47	26	+21	9	Advance to Division 4 semi-finals; division champions are promoted to Division 3
2	Offaly (P)	3	2	0	1	55	31	+24	6	Advance to Division 4 semi-finals; division champions are promoted to Division 3
3	London	3	1	0	2	36	48	−12	3	
4	Carlow	3	0	0	3	26	59	−33	0	

Updated to match(es) played on 6 March 2022. Source: ladiesgaelic.ie
Rules for classification: Tiebreakers
(P) Promoted

=== Division 4 Finals ===
20 March 2022
14:00 GMT (UTC±0)
Semi-Final

Fermanagh	3-09 (18) – (22) 4-10	Limerick

Coralstown/Kinnegad GAA, Kinnegad
Referee: David Hurson

20 March 2022
16:00 GMT (UTC±0)
Semi-Final

Leitrim	3-10 (19) – (22) 2-16	Offaly

Coralstown/Kinnegad GAA, Kinnegad
Referee: Mel Kenny

3 April 2022
14:00 IST (UTC+1)
Division 4 Final

Limerick	4-04 (16) – (22) 3-12	Offaly

St Brendan's Park, Birr
Referee: Mel Kenny
