= 2021 Ladies' National Football League =

Ladies' Gaelic football competition, Ireland

League details
- Dates: 22 May – 27 June 2021
- Teams: 31

League champions
- Winners: Dublin (2nd win)
- Captain: Sinéad Aherne
- Manager: Mick Bohan

League runners-up
- Runners-up: Cork
- Captain: Martina O'Brien
- Manager: Ephie Fitzgerald

Other division winners
- Division 2: Meath
- Division 3: Laois
- Division 4: Louth

The 2021 Ladies' National Football League, known for sponsorship reasons as the Lidl Ladies' National Football League, is a ladies' Gaelic football competition taking place in summer 2021. Division placings were the same as for the 2020 competition, which was unfinished due to the COVID-19 pandemic.

Revised fixtures were announced on 6 April 2021, with the tournament taking place in late May and June. Dublin were the winners.

== Format ==
=== League structure ===
The 2021 Ladies' National Football League consists of three divisions of eight teams and one of seven. Each division is divided into a North and South section with four teams in each section, except that there are three teams in 4 South. Each team plays every other team in its section once. 3 points are awarded for a win and 1 for a draw.

Teams by Province
Province	Division 1	Division 2	Division 3	Division 4
Connacht	2	0	2	1
Leinster	2	2	4	3
Munster	3	2	0	1
Ulster	1	4	2	2

=== Tiebreakers for league ranking ===
If two teams are level on points, the tie-break is:

- winners of the head-to-head game are ranked ahead
- if the head-to-head match was a draw, then whichever team scored more points in the game is ranked ahead (e.g. 1–15 beats 2–12)
- if the head-to-head match was an exact draw, ranking is determined by the points difference (i.e. total scored minus total conceded in all games)
- if the points difference is equal, ranking is determined by the total scored

If three or more teams are level on league points, rankings are determined solely by points difference.

=== Finals, promotions and relegations ===
The top two teams in each section in Division 1 contest the Ladies' National Football League semi-finals.

The top two teams in each section in divisions 2, 3 and 4 contest the semi-finals of their respective divisions. The division champions are promoted.

The last-placed teams in each section in divisions 1, 2 and 3 play a relegation playoff against each other, with the losers relegated.

== Division 1 ==
Locations of the 2021 LNFL Division 1 teams.
Red: North section; Green: South section.

=== Division 1 North ===
==== Table ====
Pos	Team	Pld	W	D	L	PF	PA	PD	Pts	Qualification
1	Donegal	3	3	0	0	66	38	+28	9	Advance to LNFL semi-finals
2	Mayo	3	2	0	1	62	40	+22	6	Advance to LNFL semi-finals
3	Galway	3	1	0	2	68	67	+1	3	
4	Westmeath	3	0	0	3	29	80	−51	0	Advance to relegation playoff; losers are relegated to Division 2

Updated to match(es) played on 6 June 2021. Source: ladiesgaelic.ie
Rules for classification: Tiebreakers

=== Division 1 South ===
==== Table ====
Pos	Team	Pld	W	D	L	PF	PA	PD	Pts	Qualification
1	Dublin (C)	3	3	0	0	80	44	+36	9	Advance to LNFL semi-finals
2	Cork	3	2	0	1	64	50	+14	6	Advance to LNFL semi-finals
3	Waterford	3	1	0	2	59	68	−9	3	
4	Tipperary (R)	3	0	0	3	34	75	−41	0	Advance to Division 1 relegation playoff; losers are relegated to Division 2

Updated to match(es) played on 6 June 2021. Source: ladiesgaelic.ie
Rules for classification: Tiebreakers
(C) League champions; (R) Relegated

=== Division 1 Relegation Playoff ===
12 June 2021
13:30 IST (UTC+1)
Relegation playoff

Report

Westmeath	2-16 (22) – (16) 2-10	Tipperary

St Rynagh's Park, Banagher

=== Division 1 Finals ===
12 June 2021
15:00 IST (UTC+1)
Semi-Final

Report

Donegal	3-13 (22) – (25) 5-10	Cork

St Jarlath's Park, Tuam

12 June 2021
17:15 IST (UTC+1)
Semi-Final

Report

Dublin	4-15 (27) – (10) 0-10	Mayo
(HT: 3-03 – 0-04)

LIT Gaelic Grounds, Limerick

26 June 2021
19:30 IST (UTC+1)
LNFL Final

Report

Cork	1-13 (16) – (21) 2-15	Dublin
(HT: 1-06 – 1-10)

Croke Park, Dublin
Referee: Séamus Mulvihill (Kerry)

== Division 2 ==
=== Division 2 North ===
==== Table ====
Pos	Team	Pld	W	D	L	PF	PA	PD	Pts	Qualification
1	Cavan	3	3	0	0	61	49	+12	9	Advance to Division 2 semi-finals; division winners are promoted to Division 1
2	Monaghan	3	2	0	1	63	50	+13	6	Advance to Division 2 semi-finals; division winners are promoted to Division 1
3	Armagh	3	1	0	2	53	54	−1	3	
4	Tyrone	3	0	0	3	49	73	−24	0	Advance to Division 2 relegation playoff; losers are relegated to Division 3

Updated to match(es) played on 6 June 2021. Source: ladiesgaelic.ie
Rules for classification: Tiebreakers

=== Division 2 South ===
==== Table ====
Pos	Team	Pld	W	D	L	PF	PA	PD	Pts	Qualification
1	Kerry	3	3	0	0	76	46	+30	9	Advance to Division 2 semi-finals; division winners are promoted to Division 1
2	Meath (P)	3	2	0	1	81	29	+52	6	Advance to Division 2 semi-finals; division winners are promoted to Division 1
3	Clare	3	1	0	2	37	66	−29	3	
4	Wexford (R)	3	0	0	3	29	82	−53	0	Advance to Division 2 relegation playoff; losers are relegated to Division 3

Updated to match(es) played on 6 June 2021. Source: ladiesgaelic.ie
Rules for classification: Tiebreakers
(P) Promoted; (R) Relegated

=== Division 2 Relegation Playoff ===
20 June 2021
14:00 IST (UTC+1)
Relegation playoff

Report

Tyrone	11-07 (40) – (11) 0-11	Wexford

Lann Léire GFC, Dunleer
Referee: Declan Carolan

=== Division 2 Finals ===
12 June 2021
13:00 IST (UTC+1)
Semi-Final

Report

Cavan	0-09 (9) – (13) 0-13	Meath

Kingspan Breffni Park, Cavan

12 June 2021
15:00 IST (UTC+1)
Semi-Final

Report

Kerry	1-14 (17) – (17) 2-11 (a.e.t.) (4–3 fk)	Monaghan

Páirc an Chreagáin, Mountbellew

TG4

26 June 2021
17:00 IST (UTC+1)
Division 2 Final

Report

Kerry	1-09 (12) – (22) 2-16	Meath
(HT: 0-05 – 1-09)

Croke Park, Dublin
Referee: Barry Redmond (Wexford)

== Division 3 ==
=== Division 3 North ===
==== Table ====
Pos	Team	Pld	W	D	L	PF	PA	PD	Pts	Qualification
1	Sligo	3	3	0	0	44	29	+15	9	Advance to Division 3 semi-finals; Division winners are promoted to Division 2
2	Roscommon	3	2	0	1	60	49	+11	6	Advance to Division 3 semi-finals; Division winners are promoted to Division 2
3	Down	3	1	0	2	52	61	−9	3	
4	Fermanagh (R)	3	0	0	3	40	57	−17	0	Advance to a relegation playoff; losers are relegated to Division 4

Updated to match(es) played on 6 June 2021. Source: ladiesgaelic.ie
Rules for classification: Tiebreakers
(R) Relegated

=== Division 3 South ===
==== Table ====
Pos	Team	Pld	W	D	L	PF	PA	PD	Pts	Qualification
1	Laois (Note: Laois are ranked ahead of Kildare because they won the head-to-head game between the teams (2-16 to 2-13)) (P)	3	2	0	1	59	46	+13	6	Advance to Division 3 semi-finals; division winners are promoted to Division 2
2	Kildare	3	2	0	1	41	42	−1	6	Advance to Division 3 semi-finals; division winners are promoted to Division 2
3	Longford (Note: Longford are ranked ahead of Wicklow because they won the head-to-head game between the teams (1-7 to 0-8))	3	1	0	2	31	41	−10	3	
4	Wicklow	3	1	0	2	34	36	−2	3	Advance to a relegation playoff; losers are relegated to Division 4

Updated to match(es) played on 6 June 2021. Source: ladiesgaelic.ie
Rules for classification: Tiebreakers
(P) Promoted

=== Division 3 Relegation Playoff ===
20 June 2021
14:00 IST (UTC+1)
Relegation playoff

Report

Fermanagh	1-12 (15) – (16) 1-13	Wicklow

Coralstown/Kinnegad GAA, Kinnegad
Referee: Lorraine O'Sullivan

=== Division 3 Finals ===
13 June 2021
14:00 IST (UTC+1)
Semi-Final

Report

Sligo	1-08 (11) – (20) 2-14	Kildare
(HT: 0-03 – 0-05)

St Brigid's GAA, Kiltoom

13 June 2021
14:00 IST (UTC+1)
Semi-Final

Report

Laois	4-15 (27) – (24) 5-09	Roscommon
(HT: 3-05 – 2-04)

Tang Gaelic Grounds, Tang

27 June 2021
16:00 IST (UTC+1)
Division 3 Final

Kildare	3-06 (15) – (16) 2-10	Laois

Baltinglass GAA Grounds, Baltinglass

== Division 4 ==
=== Division 4 North ===
==== Table ====
Pos	Team	Pld	W	D	L	PF	PA	PD	Pts	Qualification
1	Leitrim	3	3	0	0	68	36	+32	9	Advance to Division 4 semi-finals; division champions are promoted to Division 3
2	Louth (P)	3	2	0	1	66	42	+24	6	Advance to Division 4 semi-finals; division champions are promoted to Division 3
3	Antrim	3	1	0	2	47	63	−16	3	
4	Derry	3	0	0	3	31	71	−40	0	

Updated to match(es) played on 6 June 2021. Source: ladiesgaelic.ie
Rules for classification: Tiebreakers
(P) Promoted

=== Division 4 South ===
==== Table ====
Pos	Team	Pld	W	D	L	PF	PA	PD	Pts	Qualification
1	Offaly	2	2	0	0	46	35	+11	6	Advance to Division 4 semi-finals; division champions are promoted to Division 3
2	Limerick	2	1	0	1	29	29	0	3	Advance to Division 4 semi-finals; division champions are promoted to Division 3
3	Carlow	2	0	0	2	27	38	−11	0	

Updated to match(es) played on 6 June 2021. Source: ladiesgaelic.ie
Rules for classification: Tiebreakers

=== Division 4 Finals ===
13 June 2021
13:30 IST (UTC+1)
Semi-Final

Report

Leitrim	4-12 (24) – (13) 2-07	Limerick

Fr. Conroy Park, Milltown, County Galway
Referee: Ciaran Groome (Offaly)

13 June 2021
16:30 IST (UTC+1)
Semi-Final

Report

Offaly	2-04 (10) – (19) 3-10	Louth

Conneff Park, Clane

27 June 2021
14:00 IST (UTC+1)
Division 4 Final

Report

Leitrim	1-14 (17) – (21) 4-09	Louth
(HT: 0-08 – 4-03)

St. Tiernach's Park, Clones
Referee: Lorraine O'Sullivan
