= 2022–23 All-Ireland Senior Club Football Championship =

Gaelic football competition

- Dates: 22 October 2022 – 22 January 2023
- Teams: 32
- Sponsor: Allied Irish Bank
- Champions: Kilmacud Crokes (3rd title); Shane Cunningham (captain); Robbie Brennan (manager)
- Runners-up: Glen; Connor Carville (captain); Malachy O'Rourke (manager)

Tournament statistics
- Matches played: 31
- Goals scored: 69 (2.23 per match)
- Points scored: 671 (21.65 per match)
- Top scorer(s): Dessie Conneely (Moycullen) (0–26)

The 2022–23 All-Ireland Senior Club Football Championship was the 52nd staging of the All-Ireland Senior Club Football Championship, the Gaelic Athletic Association's premier inter-county club Gaelic football tournament. The draws for the respective provincial championships took place at various stages between June and September 2022. The competition ran from 22 October 2022 to 22 January 2023.

The defending champion was Kilcoo; however, the club lost to Glen in the Ulster Club SFC final.

Kilmacud Crokes defeated Glen by 1–11 to 1–9 in the final at Croke Park to win the competition.

However, Kilmacud Crokes finished the game with an extra player on the pitch, causing significant controversy. The GAA ordered a replay of the final after Glen lodged an objection. After Kilmacud Crokes lodged an appeal against a replay, Glen withdrew from the appeals process, saying that they "do not believe the conditions exist for a replay"; this resulted in Kilmacud keeping the title.

== Teams ==
Team	County	Captain(s)	Manager	Most recent success			
Team	County	Captain(s)	Manager	All-Ireland	Provincial	County	#
Ballybay	Monaghan	Eoin McKearney	Jerome Johnston; Mark Doran			2012	
Castletown	Wexford	Conor Carty	Jimmy Fogarty			2019	
Clonmel Commercials	Tipperary	Jamie Peters	Robbie O'Dwyer		2015	2020	
Colmcille	Longford	Jack Macken	Mickey Harkin			2008	
Crossmaglen Rangers	Armagh	Stephen Morris	Stephen Kernan	2012	2015	2019	
The Downs	Westmeath	Luke Loughlin; Mark Kelly	Lar Wall			2005	
Éire Óg, Ennis	Clare	Gavin Cooney	Paul Madden			2021	
Enniskillen Gaels	Fermanagh	Richard O'Callaghan	Simon Bradley			2006	
Erin's Own, Cargin	Antrim	James Laverty	Ronan Devlin			2020	
Errigal Ciarán	Tyrone	Tommy Canavan	Mark Harte		2002	2012	
Glen	Derry	Connor Carville	Malachy O'Rourke			2021	
Gowna	Cavan	Ryan McGahern	Fintan Reilly; Dermot McCabe			2002	
Kerins O'Rahilly's	Kerry	Ross O'Callaghan	William Harmon			2010	
Kilcoo	Down	Conor Laverty; Aidan Branagan	Conleith Gilligan	2022	2021	2021	
Kilmacud Crokes	Dublin	Shane Cunningham	Robbie Brennan	2023	2021	2021	
Moycullen	Galway	Dessie Conneely	Don Connellan			2020	
Naas	Kildare	Eoin Doyle	Joe Murphy			2021	
Naomh Conaill	Donegal	Kevin McGettigan	Martin Regan			2020	
Nemo Rangers	Cork	Luke Connolly	Paul O'Donovan	2003	2019	2020	
Newcastle West	Limerick	Iain Corbett	Jimmy Lee			2021	
The Nire	Waterford	James McGrath	Michael Ryan			2021	
Palatine	Carlow	Jason Kane; Jack Brennan	Pado Flynn			2016	
Portarlington	Laois	Keith Bracken	Martin Murphy			2021	
Ratoath	Meath	Conor McGill	David Brady			2020	
Rhode	Offaly	Niall McNamee	Declan Gorman			2020	
St Kiernan's	London	Eoin Walsh	Cathal Óg Greene			2021	
St Mary's, Ardee	Louth	R. J. Callaghan	Cathal Murray			1995	
St Mary's, Kiltoghert	Leitrim	Nicolas McWeeney	Alan Flynn			2013	
St Patrick's	Wicklow	Tommy Kelly	Robbie Leahy			2019	
Strokestown	Roscommon	David Neary; Diarmuid McGann	John Rogers			2002	
Tourlestrane	Sligo	Gary Gaughan	Fergal O'Donnell			2021	
Westport	Mayo	Oisin McLaughlin; Niall McManamon	Shane Conway				

== Connacht ==
Quarter-finals
St Kiernan's (London)	1-08
St Mary's, Kiltoghert (Leitrim)	3-08
Moycullen (Galway)	3-18
Westport (Mayo)	1-12

Semi-finals
Tourlestrane (Sligo)	0-08
St Mary's, Kiltoghert (Leitrim)	0-06
Moycullen (Galway)	2-08
Strokestown (Roscommon)	0-07

Final
Tourlestrane (Sligo)	0-06
Moycullen (Galway)	0-13

=== Quarter-finals ===
12 November 2022 Quarter-final	St Kiernan's (London)	1-08 - 3-08	St Mary's, Kiltoghert (Leitrim)	McGovern Park
	K O’Connor 1-2 (0-1f), C Farley 0-4 (3f), M Mangan, O Kerr 0-1 each.	Report	D Kelleher, N McWeeney, J Barnes 1-0 each, P Keaney 0-3 (2f), J Casey 0-2, G Reynolds, C Hackett, D O’Connell 0-1 each.

13 November 2022 Quarter-final	Moycullen (Galway)	3-18 - 1-12	Westport (Mayo)	MacHale Park
	D Conneely 0-10 (5fs), N Walsh 0-4 (2fs), M O'Reilly, D Cox, A Claffey 1-0 each, P Kelly 0-2, O Gallagher, E Kelly 0-1 each	Report	K Kilkelly 0-7 (5fs), B McDermott 1-0, O McLoughlin 0-2, M Moran, F McDonagh, R Brickenden all 0-1 each.

=== Semi-finals ===
19 November 2022 Semi-final	Tourlestrane (Sligo)	0-08 - 0-06	St Mary's, Kiltoghert (Leitrim)	Páirc Seán Mac Diarmada
	Liam Gaughan (0-4, 2f), John Francis Carr (0-1), Kenny Gavigan (0-1), Gary Gaughan (0-1), Rian Kennedy (0-1)	Report	Paul Keaney (0-3, 1 ‘45’, 1f), Mark Diffley (0-1), Diarmuid Kelleher (0-1), Cian Singleton (0-1)	Referee: L Devenney

20 November 2022 Semi-final	Moycullen (Galway)	2-08 - 0-07 (aet)	Strokestown (Roscommon)	Tuam Stadium
	D Conneely 0-4, O Gallagher 0-3, S Kelly, G Davoren 1-0 each, P Kelly 0-1.	Report	D McGann 0-4 (3f), S McGinley 0-2 (1 ’45, 1f), Cathal Compton 0-1.	Referee: J Gilmartin (Sligo)

=== Final ===
4 December 2022 Final	Moycullen (Galway)	0-13 - 0-06	Tourlestrane (Sligo)	Pearse Stadium
	D Conneely (0-4f), P Cooke (0-3), P Kelly (0-2), A Claffey (0-1), M O'Reilly (0-1), O Gallagher (0-1), T Clarke (0-1)	Report	J Kelly (0-2), L Gaughan (0-2), O Kennedy (0-1), G Gaughan (0-1)	Referee: J Henry (Mayo)

== Leinster ==
Preliminary round
Palatine (Carlow)	2-14
St. Patrick's (Wicklow)	0-08
Castletown (Wexford)	0-10
Portarlington (Laois)	1-11
St. Mary's, Ardee (Louth)	3-07
Colmcille (Longford)	1-07

Quarter-finals
Palatine (Carlow)	0-09
Portarlington (Laois)	3-19
Kilmacud Crokes (Dublin)	3-14
Naas (Kildare)	0-14
St. Mary's, Ardee (Louth)	0-12
The Downs (Westmeath)	1-17
Ratoath (Meath)	0-11
Rhode (Offaly)	0-09

Semi-finals
Portarlington (Laois)	0-04
Kilmacud Crokes (Dublin)	1-12
The Downs (Westmeath)	2-12
Ratoath (Meath)	0-17

Final
Kilmacud Crokes (Dublin)	1-12
The Downs (Westmeath)	0-08

=== First round ===
22 October 2022 First round	Palatine (Carlow)	2-14 - 0-08	St. Patrick's (Wicklow)	Netwatch Cullen Park
	S O’Neill 0-7 (6f); C Crowley 1-3, T Sheehan 1-0, A Kehoe 0-2, J Egan, C O’Neill 0-1 each.	Report	T Kelly 0-3 (1f); C O’Brien 0-2; S Doyle (45), S Duffy (f), P O’Brien 0-1 each.	Referee: P Maguire (Longford)

23 October 2022 First round	St. Mary's, Ardee (Louth)	3-07 - 1-07	Colmcille (Longford)	Páirc Mhuire
	D McConnon 2-1, S Matthews 1-1, J Commins 0-3 (1f), Carl Gillespie, R Carroll 0-1 each	Report	J Macken 0-4f, C Reilly 1-0, P McKeon, F Sheridan, E Hawkins 0-1 each.	Referee: A Nolan (Wicklow)

23 October 2022 First round	Castletown (Wexford)	0-10 - 1-11	Portarlington (Laois)	Chadwicks Wexford Park
	R Brooks 0-3, 0-2 frees, D Brooks (f), C Kennedy, L Coleman, C Carty (f), J Higgins, B Halpin, D Holmes 0-1 each.	Report	P O'Sullivan 1-0, C Murphy 0-6, 0-5 frees, S Osbourne 0-2, '45w, A Ryan, R Murphy, D Murphy 0-1 each.	Referee: F Kelly (Longford)

=== Quarter-finals ===
6 November 2022 Quarter-final	Palatine (Carlow)	0-09 - 3-19	Portarlington (Laois)	Netwatch Cullen Park
	S O’Neill 0-6 (5fs), J Egan 0-2 (1mark), C Moran 0-1.	Report	C Murphy 1-6 (1 45), R Murphy 2-2 (1f), D Murphy 0-3 (1f), A Ryan 0-2, J Moore 0-2, J Fitzpatrick 0-2, R Coffey 0-1, S Byrne 0-1	Referee: C Reilly (Meath)

6 November 2022 Quarter-final	Ratoath (Meath)	0-11 - 0-09	Rhode (Offaly)	Páirc Tailteann
	D McGowan 0-3 (2f), E Wallace 0-2, K McCabe, B O’Brien, J Flynn (f), C O’Brien, C Rogers, B McMahon (m) 0-1 each.	Report	N McNamee 0-7f, C McNamee, A Kelleghan 0-1 each.	Referee: S Muhare (Laois)

6 November 2022 Quarter-final	The Downs (Westmeath)	1-17 - 0-12	St. Mary's, Ardee (Louth)	TEG Cusack Park
	L Loughlin 0-5, K O’Sullivan 1-1, A Kilmartin, C Coughlan 0-3 each, I Martin, N Mitchell (1f) 0-2 each, J Lynam 0-1.	Report	D Clarke (1f), R Carroll, Conor Keenan, C Gillespie (1f) 0-2 each, K Moran, D Matthews, Ciaran Keenan, D McConnon 0-1 each.	Referee: J Hickey (Carlow)

6 November 2022 Quarter-final	Kilmacud Crokes (Dublin)	3-14 - 0-14	Naas (Kildare)	Parnell Park
	S Walsh (2fs), S Cunningham (1m) 0-4 each, D Mullin 1-1 (0-1m), C Dias, H Kenny 1-0 each, A Jones 0-2, S Horan, T Fox, C O'Connor (m) 0-1 each.	Report	D Kirwan 0-4, A Beirne 0-3, L Mullins (2 45s), E Callaghan 0-2 each, T Browne, B Stynes, C Doyle all 0-1 each.	Referee: A Nolan (Wicklow)

=== Semi-finals ===
19 November 2022 Semi-final	Ratoath (Meath)	0-17 - 2-12	The Downs (Westmeath)	Croke Park
	D McGowan 0-6 (0-3f), C Rogers 0-2, J Flynn 0-2 (0-1 45), E Wallace 0-2, B McMahon 0-2, B O’Brien 0-1, K McCabe 0-1, C Rooney 0-1.	Report	L Loughlin 0-5 (0-2f), N Mitchell 1-1 (0-1f), C Nolan 1-0, A Kilmartin 0-2, I Martin 0-1, J Lynam 0-1, E Burke 0-1, C Coughlan 0-1.

19 November 2022 Semi-final	Portarlington (Laois)	0-04 - 1-12	Kilmacud Crokes (Dublin)	Croke Park
	A Ryan (0-2), C Murphy (0-2, two frees).	Report	A McGowan (1-0); D Mullin (0-3, one mark, one free), S Walsh (0-3, one mark, one free), S Cunningham (0-2, one mark), P Purcell (0-2), C O’Connor (0-1), B Shehey (0-1).

=== Final ===
4 December 2022 Final	The Downs (Westmeath)	0-08 – 1-12	Kilmacud Crokes (Dublin)	Croke Park
	L Loughlin 0-3 (1f), T Tuite 0-2 (1f), D Egerton, N Mitchell (f), H Caulfield 0-1 each.	Report	S Walsh 0-9 (5f 1 45), S Cunningham 1-0, A Jones, R O’Carroll, C O’Connor 0-1 each.	Referee: Maurice Deegan (Laois)

== Munster ==
Quarter-finals
Éire Óg, Ennis (Clare)	3-11
The Nire (Waterford)	0-05
Nemo Rangers (Cork)	1-11
Clonmel Commercials (Tipperary)	2-15

Semi-finals
Kerins O'Rahilly's (Kerry)	1-09
Éire Óg, Ennis (Clare)	1-08
Newcastle West (Limerick)	1-16
Clonmel Commercials (Tipperary)	1-11

Final
Kerins O'Rahilly's (Kerry)	2-06
Newcastle West (Limerick)	1-08

=== Quarter-finals ===
12 November 2022 Quarter-final	Nemo Rangers (Cork)	1-11 - 2-15	Clonmel Commercials (Tipperary)	Páirc Uí Chaoimh
	L Connolly (0-6, 0-6 frees); M Cronin (1-2, 0-1 free); R Dalton, L Horgan, J Horgan (0-1 each).	Report	S O’Connor (1-4, 0-1 free, 0-1 mark); J Lonergan (0-6, 0-1 free); Colman Kennedy (1-1); Conall Kennedy (0-2); T Condon, P Looram (0-1 each).	Referee: B Griffin (Kerry)

13 November 2022 Quarter-final	Éire Óg, Ennis (Clare)	3-11 - 0-05	The Nire (Waterford)	Cusack Park
	G Cooney (2-4, 2f), M McInerney (1-4, 1f, 1 ’45), P Talty (0-2), D O’Neill (0-1).	Report	D Ryan (0-3f), T Guiry (0-1); D Guiry, A Ryan (0-1).	Referee: J Ryan

=== Semi-finals ===
27 November 2022 Semi-final	Kerins O'Rahilly's (Kerry)	1-09 - 1-08	Éire Óg, Ennis (Clare)	Austin Stacks Park
	T Walsh 1-2 (0-1m), J Savage 0-4 (2f), G O’Brien 0-2; C Coffey 0-1.	Report	G Cooney 0-5 (3f), E O’Connor 1-0, C Russell 0-1; P Talty 0-1, M McInerney 0-1 (mk).	Referee: S Lonergan (Tipperary)

27 November 2022 Semi-final	Newcastle West (Limerick)	1-16 - 1-11 (aet)	Clonmel Commercials (Tipperary)	FBD Semple Stadium
	S O’Connor (1-2); J Lonergan (0-3, 1 free); J Kennedy (2 frees), M Quinlivan (0-2 each); C Deely, K Fahey (0-1 each).	Report	E Hurley (0-6, 3 frees, 1 mark); E Rigter (1-1); D Kelly (1 free), C Sheehan (0-3 each); I Corbett, B O’Sullivan, R O’Connor (0-1 each).	Referee: D Murnane (Cork)

=== Final ===
10 December 2022 Semi-final	Kerins O'Rahilly's (Kerry)	2-06 - 1-08	Newcastle West (Limerick)	Mallow GAA Complex
	T Walsh 1-1 (1m); BJ Keane 1-0; J Savage 0-2 (2fs); C Coffey, T Hoare, B Hanafin 0-1 each.	Report	E Hurley 0-5 (5 fs); M McMahon 1-0; S Stack, I Corbett, A Neville 0-1 each.	Referee: S Lonergan (Tipperary)

== Ulster ==
Preliminary round

Quarter-finals

Semi-finals

Final

Erin's Own, Cargin (Antrim)
2-13 (aet) (4)

Naomh Conaill (Donegal)
2-13 (aet) (1)

Erin's Own, Cargin (Antrim)
0-8

Glen (Derry)
1-10

Glen (Derry)
3-10

Errigal Ciarán (Tyrone)
1-12

Glen (Derry)
1-12

Kilcoo (Down)
1-6

Enniskillen Gaels (Fermanagh)
1-17 (aet) (5)

Gowna (Cavan)
2-14 (aet) (3)

Enniskillen Gaels (Fermanagh)
1-9

Kilcoo (Down)
3-14

Kilcoo (Down)
2-14

Crossmaglen Rangers (Armagh)
1-9

Ballybay Pearse Brothers (Monaghan)
1-7

Ballybay Pearse Brothers (Monaghan)
2-11

=== Preliminary round ===
5 November 2022 Preliminary round	Crossmaglen Rangers (Armagh)	1-09 - 2-11	Ballybay Pearse Brothers (Monaghan)	Athletic Grounds
	R O’Neill 1-1, C McConville 0-3 (0-2f), C Finnegan 0-2, R Fitzpatrick 0-2, J Clarke 0-1.	Report	S McGuinness 1-2 (1-0pen), P Finlay 0-4 (0-3f), A Toner 1-0, D Ward 0-2, D Wylie 0-1, C McGuinness 0-1 (0-1m), T Kerr 0-1.	Referee: Noel Mooney (Cavan)

=== Quarter-finals ===
12 November 2022 Quarter-final	Enniskillen Gaels (Fermanagh)	1-17 - 2-14; Penalties: 5-3	Gowna (Cavan)	Brewster Park
	C Love (0-8, 2f), C Jones (1-1, 1f), J Reihill (0-4, 2f), E Beacom (0-1f), C Watson (0-1), E Beresford (0-1).	Report	R Fitzpatrick (1-2), TJ Fitzpatrick (1-0), C Madden (0-3f), T Madden (0-3f), C Casey (0-2), C Madden (0-2, 1m), M McKeever (0-1), D Madden (0-1).

13 November 2022 Quarter-final	Erin's Own, Cargin (Antrim)	2-13 - 2-13; Penalties: 4-1	Naomh Conaill (Donegal)	Corrigan Park
	K McShane (1-1), K Close (1-1), P Shivers (0-3), T McCann (0-2), M McCann (0-1), J Gribbin (0-1), C Donnelly (0-1); S O'Neill (0-1); J McNabb (0-1f); E Quinn (0-1).	Report	J Mac Ceallbhuí (0-5); K Gallagher (1-1), J O'Malley (1-0), C McGuinness (0-2f), C Thompson (0-2f), K McGettigan (0-1), L McLoone (0-1), D Molloy (0-1).

13 November 2022 Quarter-final	Glen (Derry)	3-10 - 1-12	Errigal Ciarán (Tyrone)	Celtic Park
	A Doherty (1-1), C Convery, E Doherty (1-0 each), S O’Hara (0-2), E Bradley (0-2), T Flannagan, J Doherty, C McGuckian (0-1 each), D Tallon (0-1f), C Glass (0-1 ‘45’)	Report	T Canavan (1-4, 3f), D Canavan (0-3, 1f), R Canavan (0-2), P Óg McCartan (0-2), P McGirr, M Kavanagh (0-1 each)

13 November 2022 Quarter-final	Kilcoo (Down)	2-14 - 1-07	Ballybay Pearse Brothers (Monaghan)	St Tiernach's Park
	R Johnston (1-1), P Devlin (0-4, 3f, 1 ’45), M Rooney (1-0), A Branagan (0-2), C Doherty (0-2), R McEvoy (0-2, 1f); N Kane (0-1f); J Johnston (0-1m), C Laverty (0-1).	Report	S McGuinness (1-0, pen), P Finlay (0-2, 1f), T Kerr (0-1, '45); C Lennon (0-1), C Galligan (0-1), D Ward (0-1f), A Toner (0-1).

=== Semi-finals ===
26 November 2022 Semi-final	Enniskillen Gaels (Fermanagh)	1-09 - 3-14	Kilcoo (Down)	Athletic Grounds
	E Beacom (1-3, 1f), R O’Callaghan (0-2); C Watson (0-1); J Horan (0-1), C Love (0-1,f) J Reihill (0-1).	Report	S Johnston (2-1); P Devlin (0-4, 4fs), Aaron Morgan (1-0), C Doherty (0-2), D Branagan (0-2), M Rooney (0-1); R Johnston (0-1), C Laverty (0-1), A Branagan (0-1}, E Branagan (0-1).	Referee: Sean Hurson (Tyrone)

27 November 2022 Semi-final	Erin's Own, Cargin (Antrim)	0-08 - 1-10	Glen (Derry)	O'Neill's Healy Park
	T McCann (0-2f), P Shivers (0-2, 1m, 1f), K O’Boyle (0-1), C Bradley (0-1), J McNabb (0-1f), G McCann (0-1)/	Report	D Tallon (1-4, 1m, 2f, 1-0 pen), E Bradley (0-2f), C Glass (0-2), A Doherty (0-1), M Warnock (0-1)	Referee: K Eannetta (Tyrone)

=== Final ===
11 December 2022 Final	Kilcoo (Down)	1-06 - 1-12	Glen (Derry)	Athletic Grounds
	A Branagan 1-1, P Devlin 0-2 (2fs), R McEvoy (1f), D Branagan, J Johnston (1m) all 0-1 each.	Report	D Tallon 0-5 (5fs), A Doherty 1-0, E Bradley 0-2 (2fs) R Dougan, C McGuckian, E Doherty, C Glass, J Doherty all 0-1 each.	Referee: Joe McQuillan (Cavan)

== Semi-finals ==
8 January 2023 Semi-final	Kilmacud Crokes	1-14 - 0-14	Kerins O'Rahilly's	Croke Park
	H Kenny (1-2); S Cunningham, D Mullin, A Jones, S Walsh (free) (0-2) each; C O’Connor, S Horan, C Dias, T Fox (0-1 each).	Report	J Savage (0-7, 6 frees); BJ Keane, C Hayes (0-2 each); G O’Brien, T Walsh, G Savage (0-1 each).	Referee: N Cullen (Fermanagh)

8 January 2023 Semi-final	Moycullen	0-12 - 1-11	Glen	Croke Park
	D Conneely 0-8 (8f); P Cooke 0-2; O Gallagher, N Walsh 0-1 each.	Report	D Tallon (1f), E Bradley (1f) 0-3 each; T Flannagan 1-0; E Doherty 0-2; C Mulholland, M Warnock, C Glass 0-1 each.	Referee: David Gough (Meath)

== Final ==
22 January 2023 Final	Kilmacud Crokes	1-11 - 1-09	Glen	Croke Park
	S Walsh 1-3 (1’45 2f), D Mullin 0-2, S Cunningham 0-2, D O’Brien, C Dias, C O’Connor, P Mannion (f) all 0-1	Report	D Tallon 1-3 (2f), E Bradley 0-2 (1f), A Doherty 0-2 (1 mark), J Doherty, C McGuckian both 0-1.	Referee: Derek O'Mahoney (Tipperary)

== Bracket ==
Semi-finals		Final
Kilmacud Crokes (Dublin)	1-14
Kerins O'Rahilly's (Kerry)	0-14	Kilmacud Crokes (Dublin)	1-11
Glen (Derry)	1-11	Glen (Derry)	1-09
Moycullen (Galway)	0-12

== Statistics ==
=== Top scorers ===
Overall

Rank	Player	Club	Tally	Total	Matches	Average
1	Dessie Conneely	Moycullen	0-26	26	4	6.50
2	Shane Walsh	Kilmacud Crokes	1-21	24	5	4.80
3	Danny Tallon	Glen	2-16	22	5	4.40
4	Colm Murphy	Portarlington	1-14	17	3	5.66
5	Gavin Cooney	Éire Óg, Ennis	2-09	15	2	7.50
6	Shane Cunningham	Kilmacud Crokes	1-10	13	5	2.60
6	Luke Loughlin	The Downs	0-13	13	3	4.33
6	Shane O'Neill	Palatine	0-13	13	2	6.50
6	Jack Savage	Kerins O'Rahilly's	0-13	13	3	4.33
10	Seán O'Connor	Clonmel Commercials	2-06	12	2	6.00

In a single game

Rank	Player	Club	Tally	Total	Opposition
1	Gavin Cooney	Éire Óg, Ennis	2-04	10	The Nire
1	Dessie Conneely	Moycullen	0-10	10	Westport
3	Colm Murphy	Portrarlington	1-06	9	Palatine
3	Shane Walsh	Kilmacud Crokes	0-09	9	The Downs
5	Rioghan Murphy	Portrarlington	2-02	8	Palatine
5	Dessie Conneely	Moycullen	0-08	8	Glen
5	Conor Love	Enniskillen Gaels	0-08	8	Gowna
8	Shealan Johnston	Kilcoo	2-01	7	Enniskillen Gaels
8	Dáire McConnon	St. Mary's, Ardee	2-01	7	Colmcille
8	Danny Tallon	Glen	1-04	7	Erin's Own
8	Tommy Canavan	Errigal Ciarán	1-04	7	Glen
8	Mark McInerney	Éire Óg, Ennis	1-04	7	The Nire
8	Seán O'Connor	Clonmel Commercials	1-04	7	Nemo Rangers
8	Killian Kilkelly	Westport	0-07	7	Moycullen
8	Niall McNamee	Rhode	0-07	7	Ratoath
8	Shane O'Neill	Palatine	0-07	7	St. Patrick's
8	Jack Savage	Kerins O'Rahilly's	0-07	7	Kilmacud Crokes

=== Miscellaneous ===
- The Downs qualified for the Leinster Club SFC final for the first time in 50 years.
- Glen won the Ulster Club SFC for the first time.
- Kerins O'Rahilly's won the Munster Club SFC for the first time.
- Moycullen won the Connacht Club SFC for the first time.

== Awards ==
Team of the Year

1. Conor Ferris (Kilmacud Crokes)
2. Michael Warnock (Glen)
3. Ryan Dougan (Glen)
4. Dan O'Brien (Kilmacud Crokes)
5. Andrew McGowan (Kilmacud Crokes)
6. Rory O'Carroll (Kilmacud Crokes)
7. Ethan Doherty (Glen)
8. David Moran (Kerins O'Rahilly's)
9. Emmett Bradley (Glen)
10. Jack Doherty (Glen)
11. Shane Cunningham (Kilmacud Crokes)
12. Seán Kelly (Moycullen)
13. Dara Mullin (Kilmacud Crokes)
14. Danny Tallon (Glen)
15. Shane Walsh (Kilmacud Crokes)

Footballer of the Year

- Shane Cunningham (Kilmacud Crokes)

Also nominated: Ryan Dougan (Glen) & Dara Mullin (Kilmacud Crokes)
