= Irish Horse Welfare Trust =

Animal welfare charity in Ireland

- Formation: 2001
- Type: Charity
- Location: Ireland

The Irish Horse Welfare Trust is a registered animal welfare charity in Ireland. According to its website, it was formally set up in 2001 to help the plight of neglected horses in Ireland, and has been Ireland's largest dedicated equine charity. It was established to provide a dedicated centre that is equipped for dealing with the rehabilitation and re-homing of equines. It was described by the Irish Times in 2019 as a "prominent" charity. The Irish Farmers' Journal has referred to the IHWT as "Ireland's largest dedicated equine charity."

== Facilities and Partnerships ==
The Irish Horse Welfare Trust is located on a 68 acre farm in Co. Wicklow, within the vicinity of the Wicklow Mountains, which it purchased in 2008, having raised almost €700,000 through donations and a mortgage. It also acknowledged donations from Horse Racing Ireland and the Irish National Stud. Prior to this, it had been renting a facility. It also received financial support "from bookmakers, stud farms and various individuals throughout Ireland," according to the Irish Times. During this time, it was caring for 16 former racehorses and 23 horses and ponies of various types.

It has partnerships with several associations and bodies, such as (but not limited to) the Department of Agriculture, Food & the Marine, the Association of Irish Racehorse Owners, Horse Racing Ireland, Irish Racehorse Trainers Association, Tattersalls Ireland, the Galway Races, and the Association of Irish Racecourses. As of 2016, the charity's patrons included the international showjumper Jessica Kürten, and well-known trainers such as Jessica Harrington, Chryss Goulandris (Lady O'Reilly) and Aidan O’Brien, according to the Irish Times. According to the Irish Independent, other patrons included Tracy Piggott and Sir Peter O'Sullevan. Prominent thoroughbred racehorse breeder, Joe Keappock, was also a board member of the Irish Horse Welfare Trust. Non-fiction books and publications, such as Modern Greats, Britain and Ireland's Top 100 Racehorses of All Time, Medium-Sized Town, Fairly Big Story – Hilarious Stories from Ireland, the State University of New York Press' Animals in Irish Society, as well as Pennsylvania State University's Irish Arts Review, have featured the Irish Horse Welfare Trust's activity. The textbook Employment Law, published by Bloomsbury in 2017, features a case involving the Irish Horse Welfare Trust.

In 2004, the IHWT was a member of the Department of Agriculture's Farm Animal Welfare Advisory Council. Tracy Piggott, Ruby Walsh, Paul Carberry, and the Coolmore Stud publicly supported IHWT fundraisers by 2005. As of 2006, the IHWT had a Midlands branch in Co. Offaly. In 2008, a large cattle drive occurred in the State of Montana, US, to raise funds for the IHWT. The event took place over eight days, in which teams were assigned to round up cows in various areas of a 40,000 acre ranch.

The Irish Horse Welfare Trust featured in a study published by the Irish Veterinary Journal in 2008.

In 2010, the Irish Horse Welfare Trust gained further note when it launched a Twitter account for retired racehorse, Moscow Flyer. The purpose of the initiative, as described in Horse & Hound, was to "keep followers updated with his life at the farm and is hoping to be a hit around the world — given the special cause he represents and, of course, his celebrity status."

During the first half of 2013, the organisation decreased the quantity of horses under its supervision from 98 to 67 by means of euthanasia and rehoming. A grant application from that year stated that "a board decision was made to humanely euthanise any equines with long term injuries or illnesses due to the inability to meet the costs of their care." In 2015, the IHWT stated that their euthanisation policy was consistent with that employed by various British charities, and they found it "extremely difficult" to identify new homes for horses with chronic health issues.

By 2016, the thoroughbred racehorse, Sizing Europe, winner of the 2008 Irish Champion Hurdle and 2011's Queen Mother Champion Chase at Cheltenham, was residing on the IHWT farm, according to the Irish Farmers Journal.

In 2018, the Irish Horse Welfare Trust launched an online animal welfare course in partnerships with RACE and Horse Racing Ireland.

As of 2019, the bloodstock breeder, broadcast journalist, and presenter of RTÉ's Nationwide, Mary Fanning, was a board member of the IHWT.

To provide a novel kind of rehabilitation to the residents of the nursing home in Co. Wicklow, the Irish Horse Welfare Trust partnered with the facility in 2019. A newly constructed equestrian complex was formally inaugurated in 2022 at Castlerea Prison in County Roscommon by Justice Minister Helen McEntee. The project fosters compassion and empathy by taking care of the rescued horses. The facility would be administered in conjunction with the Irish Horse Welfare Trust and is situated on property next to Castlerea Prison. The horse racing sector had raised more than €100,000 for the project. The IHWT also provides retired thoroughbred racehorses for participation in the project, and, according to the Sunday Independent, there existed a waiting list in the programme's participation among 342 inmates. The Irish Farmers’ Journal noted in 2024 that the project involving the IHWT was instigated by the late bloodstock agent and philanthropist, Jonathan Irwin.

On the topic of urban horse projects, the Department of Agriculture, Food & the Marine has stated that "the Irish Horse Welfare Trust (IHWT) is a key player in supporting these projects particularly in providing education supports and much needed Horse Care and Equine ID clinics."

The Irish Horse Welfare Trust is a beneficiary of Horse Racing Ireland's Foal Levy Scheme funds. According to Horse Racing Ireland, the "IHWT has initiated, for the first time in Ireland, a programme for the re-training for re-homing of ex-racehorses. The Racehorse Re-training Programme is part-funded and supported by the Foal Levy Scheme, Horse Racing Ireland, and the Irish Racehorse Trainers Association".

In a response to a question submitted by Sinn Féin TD, Eoin O'Bróin, Minister for Agriculture, Food and the Marine, Charlie McConalogue revealed that the IHWT received €136,900 from his Department in 2022.

In June 2024, following an appearance of Horse Racing Ireland before the Oireachtas’ Committee of Public Accounts, the Irish Horse Welfare Trust was named as one of the primary organisations supported by the body.

== Initiatives ==
In 2002, the Evening Herald reported on an exposé conducted by the Irish Horse Welfare Trust, in which agents and owners of large, licensed British abattoirs were secretly filmed by the IHWT purchasing horses in Ireland for the purpose of slaughter in Great Britain. The films also suggested that horses being loaded on lorries were neglected and abused while waiting at the ports. In response, the Department of Agriculture stated that it was impossible to track the destination of animals outside of the jurisdiction, but encouraged members of the public to notify Gardaí of alleged animal mistreatment at ports, who could prosecute those responsible under the Prevention of Cruelty to Animals Act, 1911.

In 2003, the IHWT made a presentation to the Oireachtas' Joint Committee on Agriculture and Food on its activities during its early years. Concerning horses used in drug trials, the trust lodged a complaint with the European Commission in 1999 alleging violations of animal welfare legislation. They pursued this strategy as all other options had been exhausted and had reached no resolution with the Department of Agriculture and Food in Ireland. They stated that the only option available to them was to approach the European Commission. Their grievance was included in subsequent infringement proceedings initiated against Ireland, which resulted in the European Court of Justice ultimately sanctioning Ireland. They received notification that as a consequence, Ireland had enacted fresh laws to completely adhere to the directives. In their presentation to the Oireachtas, they noted that the export of horses for slaughtering, regardless of age, is prohibited by State policy, and that the Department of Agriculture and Food has provided them with multiple confirmations that it does not issue licences for slaughter and that Ireland is prohibited from exporting horses for slaughter. However, the IHWT demonstrated the existence of such transactions. The presentation made by the IHWT's Sharon Newsome referenced EU Commission reports outlining instances of breaches of EU animal welfare legislation involving Irish horses. Based on the IHWT's surveillance, it was discovered that Irish agents representing British abattoirs frequently placed advertisements in publications including the Irish Farmers Journal and The Irish Field. They identified the parties engaged in this transaction. Telephone interaction could be easily conducted in response to the print ads. During 2001, horses with an average live weight of 500 kg and an average height of 16 hands were exported at a rate of IR£500 per head. Collecting them at different locations in Ireland, they were transported to the United Kingdom for slaughter. In 2002, the equivalent amount was paid in euros. The counties Wexford, Laois, and Kildare were highlighted as the primary collection sites. Weekly, and occasionally twice-weekly, shipments of horses departed Ireland for slaughter in the United Kingdom. These and other locations collected consignments.

In 2003, as operators of the State's only racehorse rehabilitation programme, it claimed that the decision to end the initiative was attributed to inadequate support from the racing sector. The IHWT expressed its inability to administer the initiative, which aimed to retrain a minimum of seven retired racehorses this year, due to the "disappointing" annual contribution of €10,000 pledged by Horse Racing Ireland (HRI), the regulating body of the sport. The money distribution was the result of eight months of negotiations between the two associations, reflecting an increasing acknowledgement within the industry of the issue of abandoned thoroughbred horses. According to welfare authorities, some people experience a continuous decline characterised by mistreatment and disregard, which might ultimately lead to their transportation for slaughter under dire conditions. Two other ex-racehorses, scheduled to be submitted by trainers, could no longer be considered. Two further fillies bred for racing, discovered neglected in a malnourished and unhealthy state in the central region of the country, would be retained by the organisation, as it intended to persist in its initiatives. The HRI, with a revenue of €49 million in 2001, has a distinct purpose in promoting the well-being and care of thoroughbred horses. According to a statement, this was achieved by providing financial support for racecourse veterinary services and the Irish Equine Centre, which conducts laboratory research. The British Horseracing Board, similar to its counterpart, also allocates funds for these services. However, in contrast, it dedicated €313,000 to three distinct rehabilitation initiatives in 2002.

In 2004, the Irish Horse Welfare Trust launched a campaign to formally ban the slaughter of horses, due to the fact that although the government had issued a ban through the Department of Agriculture in 1960, there existed an absence of actual legislation to enforce the prevention of slaughter. The IHWT was supported at its campaign launch by then Green Party MEP, Patricia McKenna, as well as former Irish international soccer player and Manchester City forward, Niall Quinn.

In 2008, it was determined that over 500 horses that failed to meet the minimum requirements would be prohibited from participating in Irish racing and instead be retrained for therapeutic purposes. An Oireachtas Joint Committee on Education and Science heard that one aspect of a programme designed by the Irish Horse Welfare Trust to rehabilitate ex-racing horses for alternative purposes was equine-assisted learning and therapy.

The equine racing sector experienced a significant decline in revenues during the economic crisis starting in 2008, when a downturn gained shape. The Irish Horse Welfare Trust had observed an increase in the incidence of horses becoming abandoned or neglected in fields with insufficient or no food resources, and that the prosperous era of equine husbandry in Ireland had undeniably encountered a period of difficulty by the turn of the 2010s.

The Irish Horse Welfare Trust appeared in a case study within a research paper titled ‘Challenges and solutions to support good equine welfare practice in Ireland,’ published by UCD in 2010.

In 2011, Minister for Agriculture, Simon Coveney, received a letter from the Irish Horse Welfare Trust (IHWT) requesting the implementation of a scheme for the identification, management, and castration of horses in "problem" regions. The organisation had previously implemented this in Dunsink, Dublin, and requested that it be done so nationwide. In December 2013, a dismayed foal who was seen standing dutifully over its dead mother in a picture was taken into care by the equestrian charity. The little horse's image gained widespread attention when its mother was cruelly beaten to death by a gang of men the previous week, which shocked and outraged the public. The Irish Horse Welfare Trust gave the foal the name "Hero," and once the photo from the Ballyguile neighbourhood of Wicklow Town was uploaded online, "it captured the hearts of animal lovers throughout the world," according to the Irish Independent. The IHWT hosted Ireland's inaugural National Equine Welfare seminar in May 2011.

A charity gala production of the play War Horse took place at the Bord Gáis Theatre, in aid of the Irish Horse Welfare Trust, in April 2014.

The Irish Veterinary Nursing Association (IVNA) named the IHWT as its ‘Charity of the Year’ for 2014.

According to an Oireachtas committee meeting from 2015, Fingal County Council engaged the IHWT following worldwide negative publicity regarding an article carried on the front page of the New York Times, which showed a photograph of a neglected horse at Dunsink. Membership in the Dunsink horse project concerned necessitated adherence to membership regulations and a code of behaviour. Every horse was implanted with a microchip and assigned a passport, while the grounds were officially recorded. Ownership of stallions was not permitted for participants, and as a component of the project, the IHWT has performed castrations on 13 stallions. Additionally, breeding activities were strictly forbidden. The IHWT was actively pursuing the establishment of a nationwide equine education and training initiative, with a primary focus on training and educating young individuals in urban populations who own horses. The trust required funding from the Department of Agriculture to renovate its farmhouse and had devised an initiative to accomplish this goal. The Oireachtas joint committee was requested to endorse the proposal. The IHWT had stated that they were currently facing a significant equine welfare crisis, characterised by the euthanisation of thousands of horses annually and the enduring agony of thousands more. According to the charity, Ireland suffered considerable harm to its reputation due to adverse reports on horse welfare.

In a 2019 edition of Animals, it was documented that for the past decade, the IHWT was responsible for delivering educational programmes on animal welfare to young people, including Travellers.

In 2021, the Irish Horseracing Regulatory Board (IHRB) used written submissions and evidence from An Garda Síochána and the IHWT during its investigation of a controversial photo depicting racehorse trainer, Gordon Elliot, sitting on a dead horse. According to RTÉ News, the jocular disposition and gesticulations of Elliott, in addition to the content of the image, caused significant public horror and outrage.

In 2024, Agriland and the Irish Independent reported that Judge David Kennedy had directed an individual, who had admitted to offences under the Animal Health and Welfare Act 2013 (AHWA), and was subsequently sentenced to three months in jail, to provide €6,441.15 towards expenses accrued by the Irish Horse Welfare Trust for the care of the animals concerned.

== Controversies ==
In 2016 the IHWT, was criticised in the national media for allegedly spending too much of its funds on administration, and "not enough on training and rehoming horses." However, the board of the IHWT publicly defended its CEO, Sharon Power, on the management of the organisation.

In 2018, the implementation of a strategy to rename the charitable organisation with a sole emphasis on thoroughbred horses resulted in significant internal conflict. The Irish Times had obtained communications from September 2018, which allegedly revealed that Jane Myerscough, the former chair of the charity's board, suggested a complete redesign that focused the foundation's emphasis solely on thoroughbred horses. The charity was to be rebranded as the Irish Racehorse Trust, with a specific emphasis on the reconditioning of former racehorses. The proposal was devised in collaboration with Vulcan Consulting, an enterprise founded by former TD, Lucinda Creighton (the cost of which was mostly borne by Horse Racing Ireland). The planned rebranding of IHWT did not occur, and in February 2019, all five members of the board left due to differences regarding the charity's strategy. The majority of these board members reportedly had strong affiliations with the racing sector.

It was reported in December 2022 that 25 horses given to the Irish Horse Welfare Trust were taken into guardianship in Ballygarrett, Co. Wexford, in June 2019. Catherine O'Brien, a native of Buttevant, was found guilty of violating animal care laws regarding the horses in June 2021, in her absence. She had not yet received a sentence for her actions. According to Section 12(1) of the 2013 Animal Health and Welfare Act, she was found liable. The statute provides for fines of up to €250,000 and/or up to five years in jail. A hearing for Ms. O'Brien's request sought a judicial review of her conviction, which was scheduled for July 2023. Referencing the case in the Seanad, Senator Lynn Boylan said: “Following the drafting of the legislation, a number of organisations have indicated they have the same problem with equines. In fact, one animal rescue has spent €250,000 caring for 25 horses seized under the Animal Health and Welfare Act, and the owner of those horses is now seeking a judicial review to further delay the transferral of those animals to loving homes.” An investigative article published by the Sunday World revealed that the Irish Horse Welfare Trust was tasked with a cost of €350,000 to care for the horses left by O'Brien.

== Media Attention ==
In 2021, the IHWT was the subject of a feature special on RTÉ's Nationwide programme. In 2023, it was the subject of a documentary by the Fédération Équestre Internationale (FEI) / International Federation for Equestrian Sports.
