= Portarlington, County Laois =

Town in counties Laois and Offaly, Ireland

Portarlington Cúil an tSúdaire
- Town
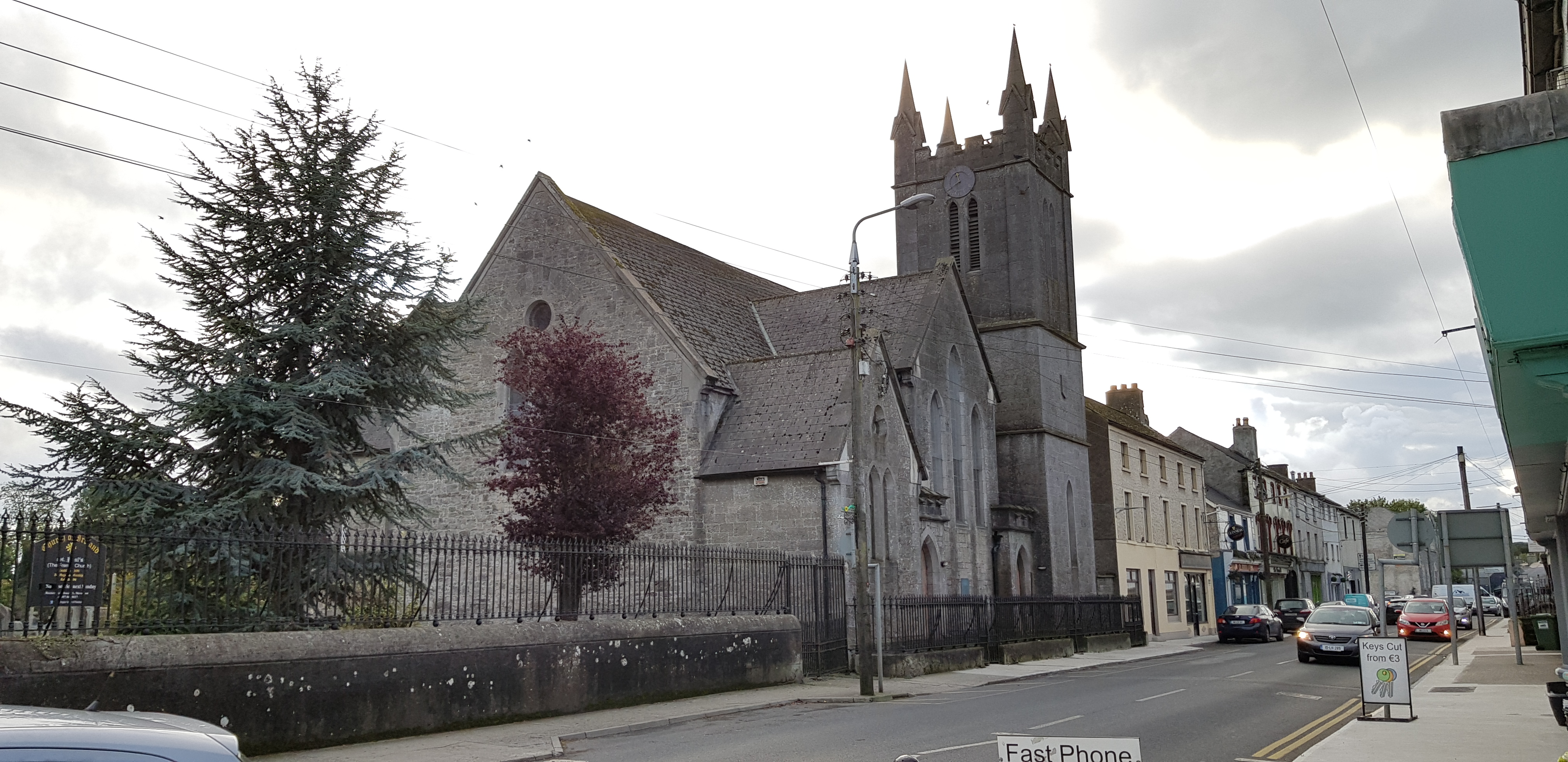
- St Paul's Church is on French Church Street off Portarlington's market square

- Location in Ireland
- Coordinates: 53.160°N 7.190°W
- Country: Ireland
- Province: Leinster
- County: County Laois & County Offaly
- Elevation: 66 m (217 ft)

Population (2022)
  - Urban: 9,288
- Time zone: UTC±0 (WET)
  - Summer (DST): UTC+1 (IST)
- Eircode routing key: R32
- Telephone area code: +353(0)57
- Irish Grid Reference: N540125

Island of Irish Rail 1906

Portarlington, historically called Cooletoodera (from Irish: Cúil an tSúdaire, meaning 'nook of the tanner'), is a town on the border of County Laois and County Offaly, Ireland. The River Barrow forms the border. Portarlington is around 70 kilometres (43 mi) west of Dublin. The town was recorded in the 2022 census as having a population of 9,288.

== History ==
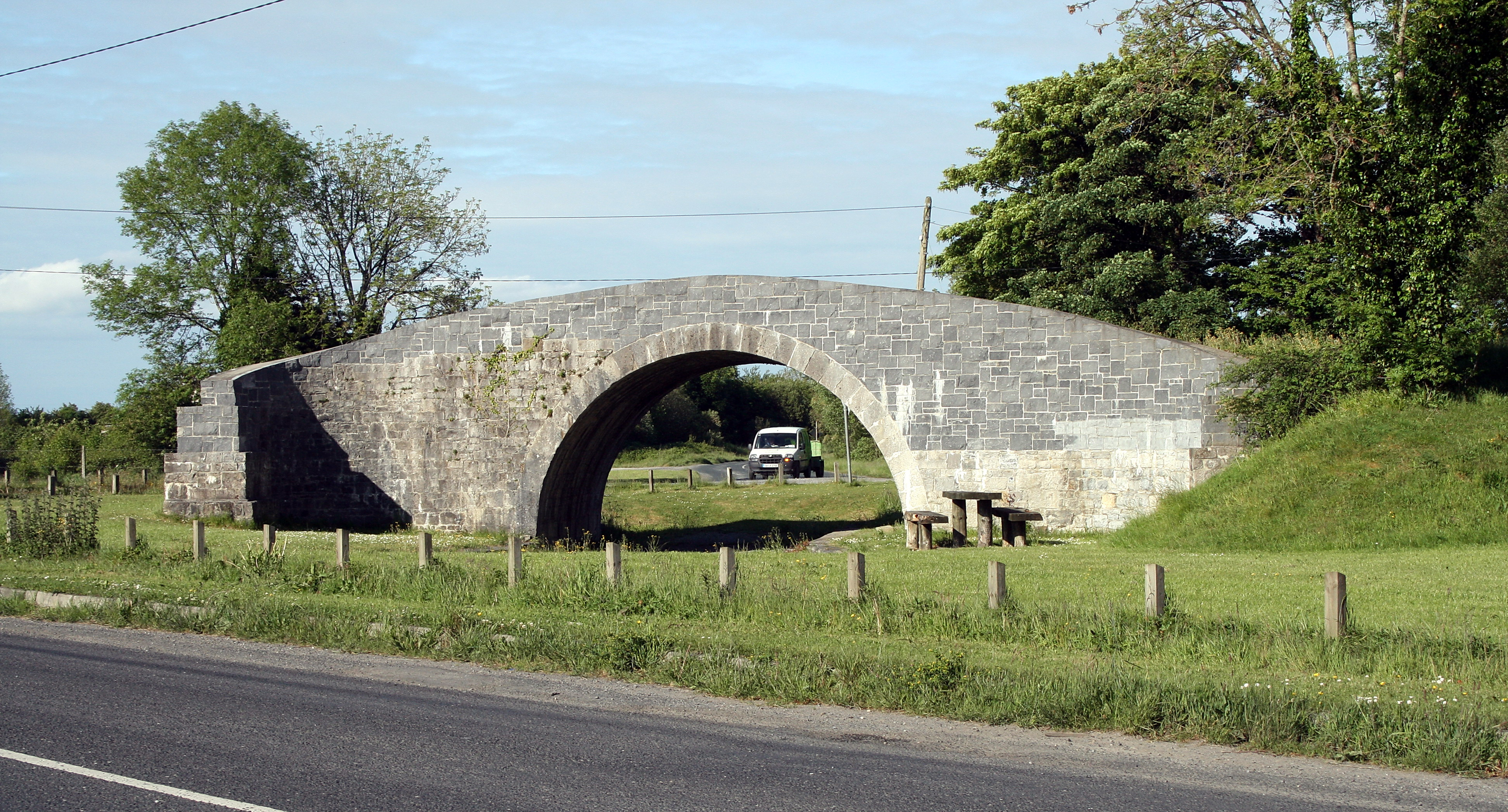
Blackhall Bridge

Portarlington was founded in 1666, by Sir Henry Bennet, who had been Southern Secretary to Charles II and to whom that King, on his restoration, had made a grant of the extensive estates of Ó Díomasaigh, Viscount Clanmalier, confiscated after the Irish Rebellion of 1641. After some difficulties, the grant passed to Sir Henry Bennet of all the Ó Díomasaigh lands in the King's and Queen's Counties, and on 14 April 1664, he was created Baron Arlington of Harlington in the County of Middlesex. So great was the anxiety of these new settlers to efface all ancient recollections in Ireland, that the Parliament of Orrery and Ormond enacted that the governor and council should be able to give new English names instead of the Irish names of places; and that after a time such new names should be the only ones known or allowed in the country. In accordance with this enactment, the borough created in Cooletoodera (Cúil an tSúdaire), received the name of Port-Arlington, or Arlington's Fort.

Historical population
Year	Pop.	±%
1821	2,877	—
1831	3,091	+7.4%
1841	3,106	+0.5%
1851	2,730	−12.1%
1861	2,581	−5.5%
1871	2,424	−6.1%
1881	2,357	−2.8%
1891	2,021	−14.3%
1901	1,943	−3.9%
1911	2,012	+3.6%
1926	1,954	−2.9%
1936	1,851	−5.3%
1946	2,092	+13.0%
1951	2,246	+7.4%
1956	2,720	+21.1%
1961	2,846	+4.6%
1966	2,804	−1.5%
1971	3,117	+11.2%
1981	3,386	+8.6%
1986	3,295	−2.7%
1991	3,211	−2.5%
1996	3,320	+3.4%
2002	4,001	+20.5%
2006	6,004	+50.1%
2011	7,788	+29.7%
2016	8,368	+7.4%
2022	9,288	+11.0%

=== Huguenot settlement 1694 ===
Following the failure of Henry Bennet's English colony, Port Arlington was re-established with the settlement of Huguenot refugees following the Treaty of Limerick:

Unique among the French Protestant colonies established or augmented in Ireland following the Treaty of Limerick (1691), the Portarlington settlement was planted on the ashes of an abortive English colony.

Fifteen or more Huguenot families who were driven from France as religious refugees settled on the ashes of Bennet's colony, and the settlement was unique among the Huguenot settlements in Ireland in that the French language survived, being used in church services till the 1820s and continuing to be taught in the town school.

... and till within the last twenty years divine service was performed in the French language. In the RC divisions, Portarlington is the head of a union or district, called Portarlington, Emo and Killinard ...

The Church of Ireland Bishop of Kildare came to Portarlington to consecrate the new French church in 1694. The present-day Church of Ireland church sits on one of the town's main thoroughfares, still named 'French Church Street', with the original French church (1694) situated just off the market square.

The relationship to the French influence with Portarlington is celebrated every July with the Festival Français de Portarlington.

=== Lea Castle ===
On the outskirts of the parish lies Lea Castle. The remnants of a Norman castle built in 1260 by William de Vesey. It changed hands many times during its history. For example, it was burned by Fionn Ó Díomasaigh's men in 1284, rebuilt by de Vesey and given to the king, burned along with its town by the Scots army in 1315, burned by the O'Moores in 1346, captured by the O'Dempseys in 1422 and then lost to the Earl of Ormond in 1452, used by Silken Thomas Fitzgerald as a refuge in 1535, mortgaged to Sir Maurice Fitzgerald in 1556, and leased to Robert Bath in 1618. It was used by the confederates as a mint in the 1640s rebellion until Cromwellians blew up the fortifications by stuffing the stairways with explosives. The castle was never used as a fortification again.

Treascon Mass Rock lies just outside the town in an area known as Treascon. This mass rock (Carraig an Aifrinn in Irish) is located within a wooded area and is a large stone used in mid-seventeenth century Ireland as a location for Catholic worship. Isolated locations were sought to hold religious ceremony, as Catholic mass was a matter of difficulty and danger at the time as a result of both Cromwell's campaign against the Irish, and the Penal Laws of 1695, whereby discrimination and violence against Catholics was legal.

The Irish Rebellion of 1798 resulted in several local men from Lea Castle being apprehended and subsequently put to death by hanging in the town's market square. A memorial in the shape of a Celtic cross with the rebels' details was commissioned and erected in 1976. The memorial stands close to the perimeter wall of the French church in the market square.

=== Rotten borough ===
The Portarlington constituency returned two MPs to the Irish House of Commons until 1801, after which it was reconstituted as a UK Parliament constituency, returning one MP. Two borough minute books have survived in the National Library of Ireland: Ms 90 for 1727–1777 and Ms 5095 for 1777–1841. They reveal the limitation of freemen and increasing control by the Dawson–Damer family, the Earls of Portarlington. The politics of the Protestant Ascendancy were responsible for turning Portarlington into a perfectly rotten borough. The reason was to preserve the planters' positions politically and economically. This extract shows that a corporation of 15 people was responsible for the re-election of nominees of the Dawson family to parliament, many of whom were non-resident, to represent the town of 2,800 people:

Prior to the legislative Union between Great Britain and Ireland, this borough sent two Members to the Irish Parliament; since 1800 it has returned one to the Imperial Parliament, and so close has been this corporation, that for 50 years previous to the last general election, the nominee of the Dawson family, commonly a total stranger to the borough, was always returned without a contest. According to the Parliamentary Returns of May 1829 and June 1830, the number of electors, resident and non-resident, was 15; that is, all the members of the corporation.

== Geography ==
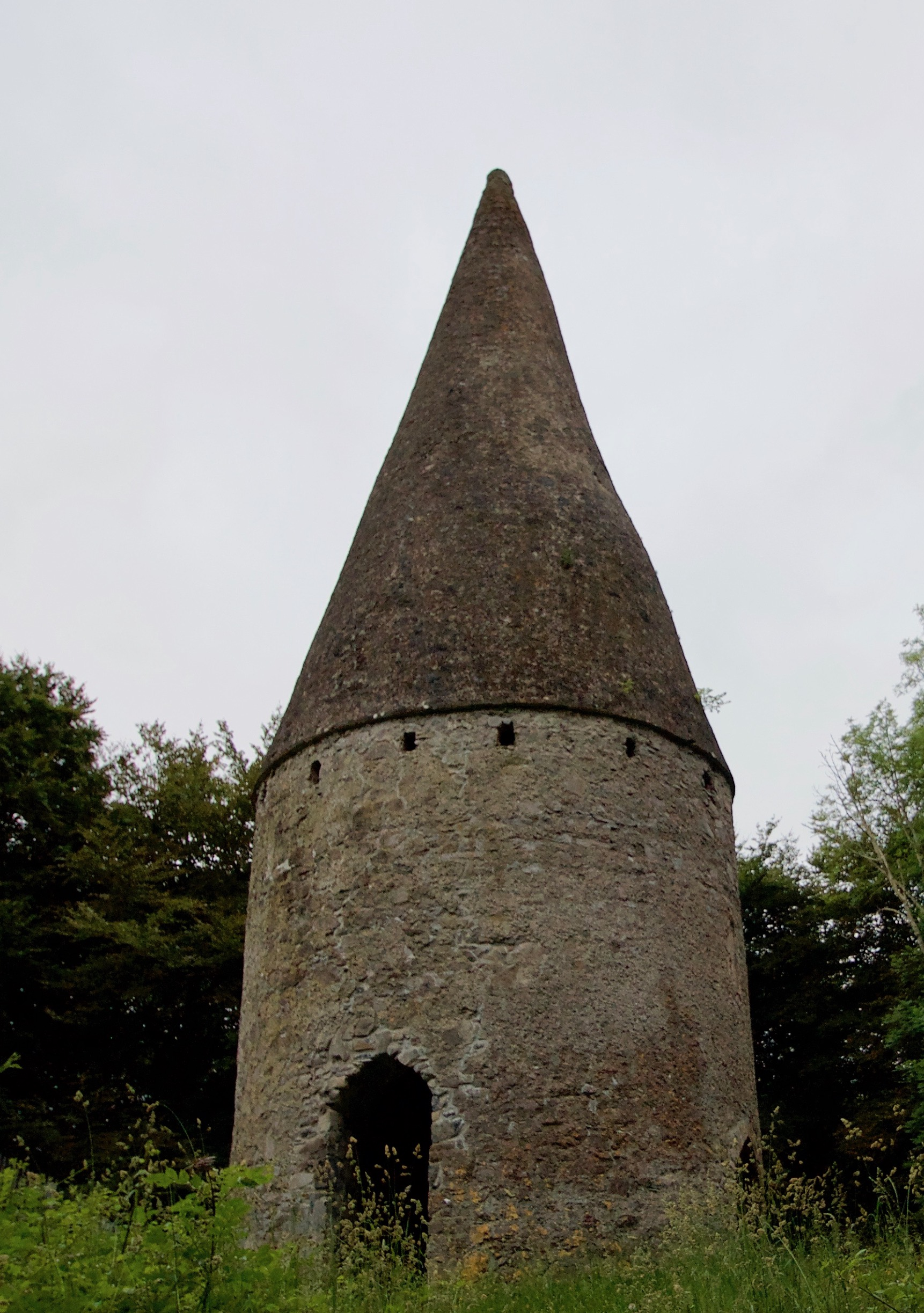
The Spire is a folly on nearby Corrig/Carrick hill

Portarlington is split by the River Barrow, with County Offaly on the north bank and County Laois on the south Bank; the town is mostly flat, with some slight street undulations. The town was partially built on the river's floodplain. More recent drainage improvements have resulted in fewer floodings to areas close to the town.

Crossing the river into County Offaly, the land becomes marshy and wet with extensive peat bogs. These peat bogs are broken by some glacial hills; one such hill is called Derryvilla Hill. These hills have been used for gravel and sand production.

The southern end of the town is dominated visually by another glacial hill, known locally as Corrig (or Carrick) hill. This hill is topped by a stone structure or spire. This spire was built in the latter half of the 19th century. Next to the spire is the town's water supply reservoir. The reservoir uses the gravity afforded by the hill to supply water to the town below.

== Demographics ==
County Laois suffered during the Great Famine (1845–1847), and the county's population dropped from over 153,000 in 1841 to just over 73,000 by 1881. Famine graveyards are known locally.

The population of Portarlington itself doubled between the 2002 and 2016 census (from 4,001 to 8,368 people), reaching 9,288 in 2022. According to the 2022 census, 79.2% of inhabitants were born in Ireland, with Poland (5%), the UK (4.4%), and elsewhere in the EU (4.8%) representing other places of birth of the population. Reflecting the development of new housing in the early 21st century, the same census suggested that a majority of residents (59.81%) were living in private homes built after 2001.

== Transport ==
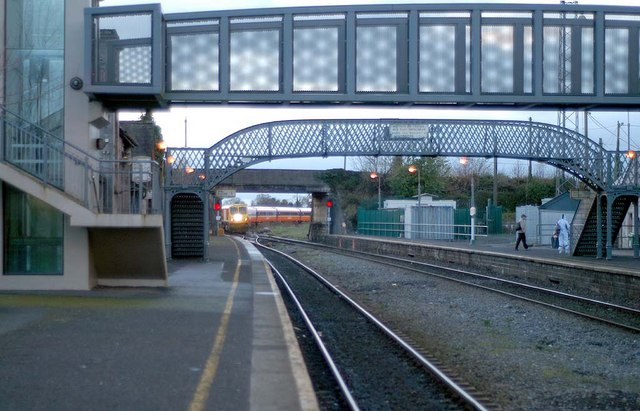
Portarlington Railway station

Portarlington is a focal point of the Irish railway network, being situated on the junction for services to the west (Galway and County Mayo), the south (Cork, Limerick, Tralee) and the east (Dublin, Kildare). Portarlington halt opened on 26 June 1847.

Public transport by road includes, as of January 2017, one intercity bus service which operates directly to Dublin. It is operated by JJ Kavanagh and Sons, and serves UCD once a day up and return. There is a Town Link service operated by Slieve Bloom Coaches linking Portarlington with Portlaoise and also with Tullamore. A Local Link service, route 806, runs daily from Portarlington to Monasterevin. A weekday service by JJ Kavanagh and Sons to NUI Maynooth University and Institute of Technology, Carlow also operates during the college term.

== Education ==
Coláiste Íosagáin is the main secondary school in Portarlington. The school, which is located on the Offaly side of the border, runs Transition Year, Leaving Cert Applied, and Leaving Cert Vocational programmes.

There are three primary schools, all located on the Laois side of the border.

There is also a third-level education college providing courses for post-secondary pupils as well as adult education courses.

== In media ==
In 2012, RTÉ filmed in Portarlington for the TV show Dirty Old Towns over a number of weeks. The show, which was presented by Diarmuid Gavin and ran for 6 weeks, showed local people making improvements to the town. One of the additions was on the banks of the River Barrow, where large red-painted letters spelling "L I F E" were erected. The original spelling was "L I V E", however when travelling from the Offaly side of the town it looked like the word "E V I L". Other developments included the addition of two all-weather soccer pitches, and improvements to the People's Park. Old shops have been redecorated, and closed premises repainted. The old French School, on the banks of the river and neglected for many years, was given a "facelift" by the local Lions Club.

== Events and culture ==
=== Culture ===
The People's Museum, situated within the Catholic Club on Main Street in Portarlington, is small but holds many different exhibits ranging from local memorabilia to a Bronze Age Celtic dagger.

Portarlington, its Savoy cinema (now closed) and the nearby Lea Castle appeared in the 1993 Irish film Into the West. The town is also mentioned in Christy Moore's song "Welcome to the Cabaret", featured on his 1994 album Live at the Point.

Outdoor pursuits of angling and hunting are available.

=== French Festival ===
A French festival, sometimes known as the Festival Français de Portarlington, has historically been held in the summer. The festival has typically run over a weekend, with live music, dance, sport, history, food and a parade. Portarlington's French influence and "Huguenot connections" are celebrated with street entertainers as well as French musicians playing on the opening day. No event has been held since 2017.

== Sport ==
Sports clubs in the area include the Gaelic Athletic Association clubs of Portarlington GAA (based at McCann Park and founded 1893), O'Dempseys GAA (based in Killenard and founded 1951) and Gracefield GAA (based at Gracefield and founded in 1920).

Portarlington RFC is the local rugby union club. It was founded in 1974 and competes in the Leinster League.

Association football (soccer) clubs include Gracefield FC, Arlington AFC, and Portarlington Town FC, each of which competes in the Combined Counties Football League of the Leinster Football Association.

Other sporting clubs in the area include Portarlington Kestrels Basketball Club, Portarlington Lawn Tennis Club, Portarlington Taekwondo and Portarlington Golf Club.

== Notable people ==
- Cathal Berry (b. 1977/1978), TD for Kildare South and Portarlington resident
- Peter Burrowes (1753–1841), Irish barrister and politician
- Edward Carson (1854–1935), Dublin-born Irish unionist politician, barrister and judge, went to school in Portarlington
- Lily Champ (b. 1931/1932), a gardener and writer from the town
- Hugh Emerson (b. 1973), Gaelic footballer with Laois and Portarlington GAA
- Aoife Hoey (b. 1983), Irish bobsledder
- James Macauley (1889–1945), professional footballer
- Feargus O'Connor (1794–1855), Chartist leader from County Cork, attended grammar school in Portarlington
- Jonathan Swift (1667–1745), prolific writer and satirist, wrote large part of his famous work Gulliver's Travels in Woodbrook House in Portarlington
- Nicole Turner (b. 2002), Paralympic swimmer

== See also ==
- List of towns and villages in Ireland
- Market Houses in Ireland
