= Lily Champ =

Irish writer on gardening and kitchen gardens

Lily Champ (born 1931 or 1932) is an Irish writer on gardening, who has grown her own fruits and vegetables for over 50 years. She writes a weekly column on her kitchen garden for the Irish Farmers Journal, and has a long-standing gardening column in Irish Country Magazine. She has lived near Portarlington in County Laois for her entire life, and has been called a "legend" of Laois gardening by Laois Today.

Champ grew up on a farm which was nearly self-sufficient for vegetables and poultry. Her own garden has been noted for its diverse flora and fauna, including a lily-of-the-valley tree which is the only one of its kind in Ireland.

She and her garden have been featured on RTÉ One programmes including Ear to the Ground in 2010, and Nationwide in 2021. Prior to the COVID-19 pandemic, Champ regularly appeared at the annual Bloom Festival in Dublin, and gave demonstrations at the National Ploughing Championships. She was a featured speaker on growing your own food at the opening of the Stradbally Community Allotment in 2012, and provides free gardening tips to local allotment owners. In 2021, she was interviewed on Midlands 103 for The Open Door with Ann-Marie Kelly.

Champ was a contributor to the Irish Countrywomen's Association (ICA) Book of Home and Family (2013), which was nominated for best Irish published book at the National Irish Book Awards.
