= Ballymoney (disambiguation) =

Ballymoney is a town in County Antrim, Northern Ireland.

Ballymoney may also refer to:

== Associated with the Co. Antrim town ==
- Ballymoney (borough), a former local government district 1973–2015
  - Ballymoney Borough Council, the former local authority for the borough
- Ballymoney United F.C., an association football club
- Ballymoney railway station

== Other ==
- A former name of Foreglen, County Londonderry, Northern Ireland
- A village near Tara Hill, County Wexford, Ireland
