= Tara Hill =

Tara Hill may refer to

- Hill of Tara, County Meath, Ireland
- Tara Hill, County Wexford, County Wexford, Ireland

== See also ==
- Taras Hill, Ukraine
