= 2025 Wexford Senior Football Championship =

Football league season

128th Wexford Senior Football Championship
Tournament details
- County: Wexford
- Province: Leinster
- Year: 2025
- Sponsor: Dominic Smith Electrical
- Date: 11 July 2025 - 2 November 2025
- Teams: 12
- Defending champions: Castletown Liam Mellows

Winners
- Champions: Castletown Liam Mellows (14th win)
- Manager: Jimmy Fogarty
- Captain: Colin Kennedy

Runners-up
- Runners-up: Shelmaliers
- Manager: Matty Forde
- Captain: Glen Malone

Promotion/Relegation
- Relegated team(s): Starlights

Other
- Matches played: 38
- Website: Wexford GAA

The 2025 Wexford Senior Football Championship was the 128th edition of Wexford GAA's premier club Gaelic football tournament for senior graded teams in County Wexford, Ireland. The tournament consisted of 12 teams, with the winner going on to represent Wexford in the Leinster Senior Club Football Championship. The championship started with a group stage and then progressed to a knock-out stage.

Castletown Liam Mellows were the defending champions after defeating Gusserane O'Rahilly's in the final the previous year winning their 13th championship.

Fethard St Mogue's returned to the senior grade after defeating St Martin's in the 2024 Wexford Intermediate Football Championship final.

Starlights were relegated to the 2026 I.F.C for the first time since 2011 after losing to Fethard St Mogue's in the Relegation final.

Castletown Liam Mellows won their 14th S.F.C and 2nd in a row by defeating Shelmaliers 0-14 to 1-07 in the Championship final.

== Team Changes ==
The following teams have changed division since the 2024 championship season.

=== To S.F.C. ===
Promoted from 2024 I.F.C.

- Fethard St Mogue's - (Intermediate Champions)

=== From S.F.C. ===
Relegated to 2025 I.F.C.

- St Anne's

== Participating Teams ==
The teams that participated in the 2025 Wexford S.F.C were:

Club	Location	2024 Championship Position	2025 Championship Position
Castletown Liam Mellows	Castletown	Champions	Champions
Crossbeg–Ballymurn	Crossabeg & Ballymurn	Semi-finalist	Quarter-finalist
Fethard St Mogue's	Fethard-on-Sea	2024 I.F.C Champions	Relegation finalist
Glynn–Barntown	Glynn & Barntown	Semi-finalist	Quarter-finalist
Gusserane O'Rahilly's	Ballycullane	Runners-Up	Semi-finalist
HWH–Bunclody	Bunclody	Relegation finalist	Quarter-finalist
Kilanerin–Ballyfad	Killinierin	Quarter-finalist	Semi-finalist
Naomh Éanna	Gorey	Quarter-finalist	Quarter-finalist
Starlights	Enniscorthy	Non-qualifier	Relegated to 2026 I.F.C
Sarsfields	Wexford	Quarter-finalist	Non-qualifier
Shelmaliers	Castlebridge	Quarter-finalist	Runners-Up
St James	Ramsgrange	Non-qualifier	Non-qualifier

== Group Stage ==
There are 2 groups called Group A and B. The top 4 in each group qualify for the quarter-finals. The bottom finisher in each group will contest in a relegation play-off.

=== Group A ===
Advance to knockout stage Advance to relegation play-off

Team	Matches				Score			Pts
Team	Pld	W	D	L	For	Against	Diff	Pts
Castletown Liam Mellows	5	5	0	0	103	55	+49	10
Kilanerin–Ballyfad	5	4	0	1	105	75	+30	8
Shelmaliers	5	3	0	2	106	96	+10	6
Glynn–Barntown	5	2	0	3	84	92	-8	4
Sarsfields	5	1	0	4	70	122	-52	2
Starslights	5	0	0	5	75	103	-29	0

==== Round 1 ====
11 July 2025 Round 1	Kilanerin–Ballyfad	3-18 (27) – (19) 2-13	Shelmaliers	Enniscorthy
19:30 IST (UTC+1)		(HT: 2-10 – 1-09)		Venue: McCauley Park Bellefield
	Pts: Conor Kinsella 1-6, Seán Hughes 0-5 (3f), Pádraig Jones 1-0, Brendan Bolger 1-0, Micheál McGonigle 0-2, Niall Hughes 0-2, Páraic Hughes 0-2 (tp), Andrew Smith 0-1	Report	Pts: Eoghan O'Gara 2-3, Eoghan Nolan 0-5 (1tpf, 1f, 1'45), Glen Malone 0-3 (1tp), Jody Donohoe 0-1, Conor Hearne 0-1	Referee: James Owen (Kilrush)

11 July 2025 Round 1	Castletown Liam Mellows	0-20 (20) – (14) 1-11	Starlights	Wexford
20:00 IST (UTC+1)		(HT: 0-13 – 0-06)		Venue: Chadwicks Wexford Park
	Pts: Darragh Brooks 0-5 (2tpf, 1'45), Jonathan Bealin 0-4 (2f), Jack Higgins 0-3 (1tp), Robbie Brooks 0-3, Killian Pierce 0-2, Conor Carty 0-1, Donnacha Holmes 0-1, Brendan Halpin 0-1	Report	Pts: Darragh Pepper 0-5 (1f), Oisín Pepper 1-1, Anthony Larkin 0-3 (1tp, 1'45), Kevin Barron 0-2	Referee: Thomas Furlong (Adamstown)

12 July 2025 Round 1	Glynn–Barntown	4-13 (25) – (13) 1-10	Sarsfields	Wexford
14:00 IST (UTC+1)		(HT: 0-08 – 1-05)		Venue: Chadwicks Wexford Park
	Pts: Seán Cooney 1-4 (1f), James Doyle 2-0, Liam Donoghue 0-5 (2f, 1tpf), Patrick Berry 1-0, Callum McDonald 0-1, Aaron Breen 0-1, Conor Mackey 0-1, Luke Codd 0-1	Report	Pts: Cathal Kirwan 1-2 (1tpf), Eoin Roche 0-3 (1tpf), Conor Cullen 0-2, Conor Kehoe 0-2, Darby Purcell 0-1	Referee: Mick Lanigan (Shelmaliers)

==== Round 2 ====
18 July 2025 Round 2	Shelmaliers	3-15 (24) – (21) 2-15	Glynn–Barntown	Wexford
19:30 IST (UTC+1)		(HT: 0-07 – 1-10)		Venue: Chadwicks Wexford Park
	Pts: Glen Malone 0-10 (6f, 1tp), Aaron Murphy 1-1, Paul Hearne 1-0, Kyle Roche 1-0, Aodhán Foley 0-2 (tpf), Cian Doyle 0-1, Graham Staples 0-1	Report	Pts: Liam Donoghue 1-7 (2f, 1'45), Aaron Breen 1-1 (1f), Callum McDonald 0-2, Conor Mackey 0-2, Cormac Cooney 0-1, James Doyle 0-1, Patrick Berry 0-1	Referee: James Owens (Kilrush)

18 July 2025 Round 2	Castletown Liam Mellows	3-16 (25) – (14) 2-08	Sarsfields	Enniscorthy
19:30 IST (UTC+1)		(HT: 2-10 – 1-04)		Venue: McCauley Park Bellefield
	Pts: Jack Higgins 2-0, Jonathan Bealin 0-5 (2tp), Darragh Brooks 0-4 (2tpf), Colin Kennedy 1-0, Killian Pierce 0-2, Gavin Kelly 0-1, Stephen Moloney 0-1, Conor Carty 0-1, Donnacha Holmes 0-1, Brendan Halpin 0-1	Report	Pts: Conor Kehoe 0-5 (1tpf, 2f), Danny Walsh 1-0, Eoin Roche 1-0, Billy Walker 0-2 (tp), Conall Ó Crualaoich 0-1	Referee: Brendan Martin (Ballyhogue)

19 July 2025 Round 2	Starlights	0-12 (12) – (19) 1-16	Kilanerin–Ballyfad	Wexford
15:45 IST (UTC+1)		(HT: 0-07 – 0-06)		Venue: Chadwicks Wexford Park
	Pts: Anthony Larkin 0-4 (2f, 1tpf), Oisín Pepper 0-4 (1tp), Lenny Connolly 0-2 (tp), Darragh Pepper 0-2	Report	Pts: Conor Kinsella 0-6, Seán Hughes 0-5 (3f), Daniel Bolger 1-0, Jason Bolger 0-1, Dean O'Toole 0-1, Niall Hughes 0-1, Páraic Hughes 0-1, Cian Hughes 0-1	Referee: Barry Redmond (Na Fianna)

==== Round 3 ====
16 August 2025 Round 3	Castletown Liam Mellows	0-18 (18) – (12) 0-12	Kilanerin–Ballyfad	Wexford
17:00 IST (UTC+1)		(HT: 0-10 – 0-6)		Venue: Chadwicks Wexford Park
	Pts: Robbie Brooks 0-4 (1tp), Brendan Halpin 0-4 (3f), Darragh Brooks 0-3 (1tpf, 1'45), Donnacha Holmes 0-2, Killian Pierce 0-2, Stephen Maloney 0-1, Jack Higgins 0-1, Conor Carty 0-1	Report	Pts: Seán Forde 0-5 (3f, 1tpf), Seán Hughes 0-3 (2f), Conor Kinsella 0-3, Micheál McGonigle 0-1	Referee: James Owens (Kilrush)

16 August 2025 Round 3	Starlights	1-13 (16) – (22) 2-16	Glynn–Barntown	Wexford
18:45 IST (UTC+1)		(HT: 1-07 – 1-02)		Venue: Chadwicks Wexford Park
	Pts: Lenny Connolly 1-2 (1pen), Anthony Larkin 0-3 (1tpf, 1'45), Darragh Pepper 0-3 (3f), Kevin Foley 0-2, Kevin Barron 0-1, Oisín Pepper 0-1, Alan Tobin 0-1	Report	Pts: James Doyle 1-4 (3f), Michael O'Regan 0-4 (1tpf, 1'45), Conor Mackey 1-0, Aaron Kehoe 0-2 (tp), Cormac Cooney 0-2, Callum McDonald 0-1, James Stafford 0-1, Conor Mahoney 0-1, Liam Donoghue 0-1 (f),	Referee: James Mullally (Guesserane)

17 August 2025 Round 3	Shelmaliers	2-23 (29) – (10) 0-10	Sarsfields	Wexford
14:00 IST (UTC+1)		(HT: 0-17 – 0-05)		Venue: Chadwicks Wexford Park
	Pts: Eoghan Nolan 0-9 (2tp, 3f, 1'45), Kyle Roche 1-1, Eoghan O'Gara 0-4, Aaron Murphy 0-3, Cian Doyle 1-0, Glen Malone 0-2 (tp), Conor Roche 0-1, Rian Ormonde 0-1, Paul Hearne 0-1, Brian Malone 0-1	Report	Pts: Cathal Kirwan 0-4 (2tpf), Eoin Roche 0-4 (2tpf), Conor Kehoe 0-2 (2f)	Referee: Stephen Burke (Volunteers)

==== Round 4 ====
22 August 2025 Round 4	Starlights	0-13 (13) – (17) 1-14	Sarsfields	Wexford
19:30 IST (UTC+1)		(HT: 0-11 – 1-06)		Venue: Chadwicks Wexford Park
	Pts: Anthony Larkin 0-4 (2tpf), Rickey Fox 0-4 (1tp), Darragh Pepper 0-2 (1f), Oisín Pepper 0-1, Ben Kidd 0-1, Lenny Connolly 0-1	Report	Pts: Andrew Harrington 1-6 (2tp, 1tpf), Danny Walsh 0-3, Conor Kehoe 0-2 (1f), Darby Purcell 0-2 (tp), Dylan Furlong 0-1	Referee: Jimmy Heaney (Geraldine O'Hanrahans)

24 August 2025 Round 4	Castletown Liam Mellows	1-15 (18) – (9) 0-09	Shelmaliers	Wexford
14:00 IST (UTC+1)		(HT: 1-09 – 0-03)		Venue: Chadwicks Wexford Park
	Pts: Darragh Brooks 0-6 (3tpf), Donnacha Holmes 1-0, Liam Coleman 0-3, Jack Higgins 0-2, Colin Kennedy 0-1, Gavin Kelly 0-1, Brendan Halpin 0-1 (f), Joe Gardiner 0-1	Report	Pts: Aodhán Foley 0-3 (1tpf, 1'45), Glen Malone 0-3 (3f), Rian Ormonde 0-1, Robbie Delaney 0-1, Corey Lawlor 0-1	Referee: Brendan Martin (Ballyhogue)

24 August 2025 Round 4	Kilanerin–Ballyfad	1-14 (17) – (10) 1-07	Glynn–Barntown	Wexford
15:45 IST (UTC+1)		(HT: 0-06 – 0-02)		Venue: Chadwicks Wexford Park
	Pts: Cian Hughes 1-2, Conor Kinsella 0-4, Seán Hughes 0-3 (3f), Dean O'Toole 0-2, Micheál McGonigle 0-1, Páraic Hughes 0-1, Niall Hughes 0-1	Report	Pts: Cormac Cooney 0-5 (2tp, 1f), David Clarke 1-1, Callum McDonald 0-1	Referee: Thomas Furlong (Adamstown)

==== Round 5 ====
21 September 2025 Round 5	Starlights	2-14 (20) – (25) 3-16	Shelmaliers	New Ross
17:00 IST (UTC+1)		(HT: 0-09 – 2-10)		Venue: O'Kennedy Park
	Pts: Anthony Larkin 0-8 (4tpf), Kevin Barron 1-1 (1f), Alan Tobin 1-0, Oisín Pepper 0-2 (tp), Jack Kelly 0-1, Darragh Pepper 0-1, Lenny Connolly 0-1	Report	Pts: Eoghan Nolan 0-8 (2tpf, 4f), Paul Hearne 1-1, Eoghan O'Gara 1-1, Brian Malone 1-0, Conor Hearne 0-3 (1tp), Jody Donohoe 0-2, Aaron Murphy 0-1	Referee: Brendan Holohan (Rathgarogue-Cushinstown)

21 September 2025 Round 5	Kilanerin–Ballyfad	2-24 (30) – (16) 2-10	Sarsfields	Wexford
17:00 IST (UTC+1)		(HT: 0-11 – 0-06)		Venue: Chadwicks Wexford Park
	Pts: Conor Kinsella 0-7 (1tp), Seán Hughes 0-5 (1tp, 1tpf), Cian Hughes 1-2, Páraic Hughes 0-4, Conor Jones 1-0, Micheál McGonigle 0-2, Pádraig Jones 0-1, Dean O'Toole 0-1 (f), Matthew Healy 0-1, Brendan Bolger 0-1	Report	Pts: Conor Kehoe 1-3 (1tpf, 1f), Ryan Furlong 1-1, Andrew Harrington 0-4 (1tp, 2f), Eoin Roche 0-1, Danny Walsh 0-1	Referee: Kevin Kehoe (Our Lady's Island)

21 September 2025 Round 5	Castletown Liam Mellows	1-19 (22) – (6) 0-06	Glynn–Barntown	Monamolin
17:00 IST (UTC+1)		(HT: 0-04 – 0-06)
	Pts: Jonathan Bealin 0-7 (1tpf), Doran Daly-O'Toole 1-0, Darragh Brooks 0-3 (1tpf, 1'45), Donnacha Holmes 0-3 (1tp), Colin Kennedy 0-2 (tp), Gavin McNulty 0-1, Joe Gardiner 0-1, Liam Coleman 0-1, Conor Carty 0-1	Report	Pts: Aaron Breen 0-2 (tp), Aaron Nolan 0-2 (tp), Michael O'Regan 0-1 (f), Ríoghan Crosbie 0-1	Referee: James Owens (Kilrush)

=== Group B ===
Advance to knockout stage Advance to relegation play-off

Team	Matches				Score			Pts
Team	Pld	W	D	L	For	Against	Diff	Pts
Gusserane O'Rahilly's	5	5	0	0	149	65	+84	10
Naomh Éanna	5	4	0	1	84	93	-9	8
Crossabeg–Ballymurn	5	2	1	2	80	73	+7	5
HWH–Bunclody	5	2	0	3	71	98	-27	4
St James	5	1	0	4	92	101	-9	2
Fethard St Mogue's	5	0	1	4	78	124	-46	1

==== Round 1 ====
11 July 2025 Round 1	Crossabeg–Ballymurn	2-11 (17) – (7) 0-07	HWH–Bunclody	Enniscorthy
19:30 IST (UTC+1)				Venue: St Patricks Park
	Pts: Shane Cullen 2-0, David McCarthy 0-4 (1tp, 1f), Mark Byrne 0-2 (tpf), Pádraig Foley 0-1, Oisín Foley 0-1, Jack Fortune 0-1, James Dixon 0-1 (f), Evan Kinlough 0-1	Report	Pts: Aidan Nolan 0-5 (2f, 1tpf, 1'45), Ciarán Regan 0-2 (tp)	Referee: Jimmy Heaney (Geraldine O'Hanrahans)

12 July 2025 Round 1	Naomh Éanna	0-15 (15) – (9) 0-09	St James	Wexford
20:00 IST (UTC+1)		(HT: 0-09 – 0-04)		Venue: Hollymount
	Pts: Rian Fitzgerald 0-8 (1tp, 1tpf, 1f, 1'45), Ruairí Martin 0-2, Shane Flood 0-1, Luke Darley 0-1, Dylan Cooke-Leonard 0-1, Cian Browne 0-1, David O'Brien	Report	Pts: Tommy Walsh 0-3 (1f), Alan Walsh 0-3 (1f), Brian Murphy 0-1, Paul Walsh 0-1, James Walsh 0-1	Referee: Justin Heffernan (Blackwater)

12 July 2025 Round 1	Gusserane O'Rahilly's	4-17 (29) – (10) 1-07	Fethard St Mogue's	New Ross
20:00 IST (UTC+1)		(HT: 1-13 – 1-01)		Venue: O'Kennedy Park
	Pts: Mark Rossiter 0-9 (6f, 1tp), Gavin Sheehan 2-0, Páraic Conway 0-5, Seán Ryan 1-0, Shane Culleton 1-0, Cormac Kiely 0-1, Mark O'Neill 0-1, John Roche 0-1	Report	Pts: Kevin Rowe 0-4 (4f), Ciarán Dwyer 1-0, Cillian Byrne 0-1, Cian Byrne 0-1 (f), Richie Waters 0-1 ('45)	Referee: Brendan Martin (Ballyhogue)

==== Round 2 ====
19 July 2025 Round 2	St James	2-05 (11) – (15) 2-09	Crossabeg–Ballymurn	Wexford
14:00 IST (UTC+1)		(HT: 2-04 – 0-03)		Venue: Chadwicks Wexford Park
	Pts: Alan Walsh 2-1 (1f), Paul Barron 0-1, Brian Murphy 0-1, Sam Foley 0-1, Kevin O'Grady 0-1	Report	Pts: David McCarthy 1-2 (1pen, 1f), Niall Cullen 1-0, Mark Byrne 0-2 (tpf), Pádraig Foley 0-2 (tp), James Dixon 0-1, Shane Cullen 0-1, Pearce Doyle 0-1	Referee: Seán Whelan (St Martin's)

19 July 2025 Round 2	Gusserane O'Rahilly's	4-19 (31) – (9) 1-06	HWH–Bunclody	Enniscorthy
18:00 IST (UTC+1)				Venue: McCauley Park Bellefield
	Pts: Mark Rossiter 2-8 (4f), Gavin Sheehan 1-1, Seán O'Connor 1-0, Seán Ryan 0-3 (1tp), Shane Culleton 0-2, Adrian Flynn 0-2, Cormac Kiely 0-1, Mark O'Neill 0-1, Páraic Conway 0-1	Report	Pts: Adam Hogan 1-0, Luke Boxwell 0-3 (3f), Tadhg Ó Ceallaigh 0-1, Ciarán Regan 0-1, David Reck 0-1	Referee: Thomas Furlong (Adamstown)

19 July 2025 Round 2	Fethard St Mogue's	1-17 (20) – (25) 3-16	Naomh Éanna	Enniscorthy
19:30 IST (UTC+1)		(HT: 1-10 – 3-08)		Venue: McCauley Park Bellefield
	Pts: John Turbitt 0-11 (8f), Richie Waters 1-1, Cian Byrne 0-2 (1f), Graham O'Grady 0-1, Seán Nunan 0-1, Kevin Rowe 0-1	Report	Pts: Rian Fitzpatrick 0-9 (3f, 1tp, 1'45), David O'Brien 1-2 (1f), J.J. Twamley 1-0, Cian Browne 1-0, Cathal Stokes 0-3, Dylan Cooke-Leonard 0-2	Referee: Gearóid McGrath (St James)

==== Round 3 ====
15 August 2025 Round 3	St James	2-15 (21) – (22) 2-16	HWH–Bunclody	Wexford
19:30 IST (UTC+1)		(HT: 0-06 – 1-07)		Venue: Chadwicks Wexford Park
	Pts: Josh Doyle-Delaney 0-5 (4f), Tomás Barron 1-1, Paul Walsh 1-0, Sam Foley 0-3 (1tp), Darragh Lyons 0-3 (1tp), Tommy Walsh 0-2 (tp), Alan Walsh 0-1	Report	Pts: Luke Boxwell 2-4 (3f), Derry Mahon 0-4 (1tpf, 2f), Ciarán Regan 0-3, Jamie John Murphy 0-3 (1f), Seán Kenny 0-1, Edward Dunbar 0-1	Referee: Kevin Kehoe (Our Lady's Island)

15 August 2025 Round 3	Gusserane O'Rahilly's	3-26 (35) – (13) 0-13	Naomh Éanna	Enniscorthy
19:30 IST (UTC+1)		(HT: 1-13 – 0-06)		Venue: McCauley Park Bellefield
	Pts: Mark Rossiter 0-8 (3f, 1tpf), Seán Ryan 2-1, Páraic Conway 0-6, John Roche 1-1, Shane Culleton 0-3 (1tp), Mark O'Neill 0-2, Gavin Sheehan 0-2, Eoin Ryan 0-1, Graeme Cullen 0-1, Evan Kiely 0-1	Report	Pts: Rian Fitzgerald 0-7 (4f, 1tpf), Cathal Stokes 0-1, Dylan Cooke-Leonard 0-1, Jack Doran 0-1, Cian Molloy 0-1, Cian Browne 0-1	Referee: Gearóid McGrath (St James)

17 August 2025 Round 3	Fethard St Mogue's	2-13 (19) – (19) 2-13	Crossabeg–Ballymurn	Wexford
15:45 IST (UTC+1)		(HT: 0-07 – 2-08)		Venue: Chadwicks Wexford Park
	Pts: John Turbitt 0-10 (5f, 1tp), Richie Waters 2-0 (1pen), Jake Molloy 0-1, Adam O'Grady 0-1, Bryan Power 0-1	Report	Pts: Conor Devereux 1-1, Shane Cullen 1-0, Pádraig Foley 0-3 (1tp), Niall Cullen 0-3, Mark Byrne 0-2 (tpf), Ben Turner 0-1 ('45), Ronan Devereux 0-1, Oisín Foley 0-1, Evan Kinlough 0-1	Referee: James Owens (Kilrush)

==== Round 4 ====
22 August 2025 Round 4	Naomh Éanna	2-08 (14) – (13) 3-04	Crossabeg–Ballymurn	Enniscorthy
19:00 IST (UTC+1)		(HT: 1-05 – 2-02)		Venue: McCauley Park Bellefield
	Pts: Rian Fitzpatrick 1-2 (1pen, 2f), Cian Molloy 1-1, Ruairí Martin 0-2, Cathal Stokes 0-2, Charlie McGuckin 0-1	Report	Pts: Conor Devereux 1-0, Shane Cullen 1-0, Evan Kinlough 1-0 (pen), Bill Eviston 0-2, Oisín Foley 0-1, Glen Murphy 0-1 (f)	Referee: James Owens (Kilrush)

23 August 2025 Round 4	Gusserane O'Rahilly's	4-20 (32) – (17) 1-14	St James	New Ross
17:30 IST (UTC+1)		(HT: 3-10 – 0-09)		Venue: O'Kennedy Park
	Pts: Mark Rossiter 1-8 (5f, 1tp), Gavin Sheehan 1-1, Eoin Ryan 1-0, Evan Kiely 1-0, Seán O'Connor 0-3, Páraic Conway 0-3, Cormac Kiely 0-2, Seán Ryan 0-2, Adrian Flynn 0-1	Report	Pts: Josh Doyle-Delaney 0-5 (1tpf, 1tp, 1'45), Tommy Walsh 1-1, Darragh Lyons 0-4 (2tp), Paul Walsh 0-2, Alan Walsh 0-1, Kevin O'Grady 0-1	Referee: James Murray (St Mary's)

23 August 2025 Round 4	Fethard St Mogue's	1-09 (12) – (17) 0-17	HWH–Bunclody	New Ross
19:00 IST (UTC+1)		(HT: 1-05 – 0-06)		Venue: O'Kennedy Park
	Pts: Cian Byrne 0-5 (1tp, 1f), Ruairí Tubrid 1-0, Jake Molloy 0-2 (1'45), Richie Waters 0-1, John Turbitt 0-1 (f)	Report	Pts: Aidan Nolan 0-9 (5f, 2tpf), John Murphy 0-4 (1tp, 1f), Darragh Farrell 0-2, Conor Crean 0-1, Cathal Doyle 0-1	Referee: Seán Whelan (St Martin's)

==== Round 5 ====
21 September 2025 Round 5	Fethard St Mogue's	1-14 (17) – (34) 5-19	St James	New Ross
15:15 IST (UTC+1)				Venue: O'Kennedy Park
	Pts: John Turbitt 1-7 (3f), Cillan Byrne 0-3, Cian Byrne 0-2 (tp), Jake Molloy 0-1, Garrett Foley 0-1	Report	Pts: Josh Doyle-Delaney 0-12 (4f, 1tp, 1tpf, 1'45), Tomás Barron 3-1, Tommy Walsh 2-2, Brian Molloy 0-1, Jason Barron 0-1, Josh White-Keating 0-1, Kevin O'Grady 0-1	Referee: Thomas Furlong (Adamstown)

21 September 2025 Round 5	Naomh Éanna	0-17 (17) – (16) 1-13	HWH–Bunclody	Monamolin
15:15 IST (UTC+1)		(HT: 0-08 – 0-08)
	Pts: David O'Brien 0-6 (1tp, 1f), Dylan Cooke-Leonard 0-5 (1tp), Cathal Stokes 0-2, Rian Fitzpatrick 0-2 (f), Seamus O'Donnell 0-1, Shane Flood 0-1	Report	Pts: Aidan Nolan 1-9 (6f, 1tpf), Jamie John Murphy 0-1, Oisín Ó Ceallaigh 0-1, Ciarán Regan 0-1, Edward Dunbar 0-1	Referee: James Murray (St James)

26 September 2026 Round 5	Gusserane O'Rahilly's	3-13 (22) – (16) 0-16	Crossabeg–Ballymurn	Wexford
19:30 IST (UTC+1)		(HT: 2-05 – 0-10)		Venue: Chadwicks Wexford Park
	Pts: Mark Rossiter 0-8 (3f, 1tp), Gavin Sheehan 1-1, Jamie Sheehan 1-0, Páraic Conway 0-1, Graeme Cullen 0-2, Eoin Ryan 0-1, Ciarán Conway 0-1,	Report	Pts: Ben Turner 0-3 (3f), Ronan Devereux 0-3 (1tpf), Pádraig Foley 0-3 (1tp), Shane Cullen 0-3, Niall Cullen 0-1, Oisín Foley 0-1, Mark O'Connor 0-1, Andy Butler 0-1	Referee: Barry Redmond (Na Fianna)

== Knockout-Stage ==
The top 4 teams from each group qualify for the quarter-finals with 1st vs 4th and 2nd vs 3rd in each case.

Quarter-finals
4 October, Wexford
Glynn–Barntown	2-08
Gusserane O'Rahilly's	1-27
3 October, Wexford
Castletown Liam Mellows	1-21
HWH–Bunclody	1-12
5 October, Wexford
Kilanerin–Ballyfad	5-17
Crossabeg–Ballymurn	2-12
5 October, Wexford
Shelmaliers	0-21
Naomh Éanna	1-11

Semi-finals
19 October, Wexford
Gusserane O'Rahilly's	0-11
Castletown Liam Mellows	2-14
19 October, Wexford
Kilanerin–Ballyfad	0-13
Shelmaliers	1-15

Final
2 November, Wexford
Castletown Liam Mellows	0-14
Shelmaliers	1-07

=== Relegation Play-Off ===
The bottom finisher in both groups play-off in a relegation final. The loser is relegated to the 2026 Wexford Intermediate Football Championship.

4 October 2025 Relegation Play-Off	Starlights	0-16 (16) – (18) 1-15	Fethard St Mogue's	Wexford
19:15 IST (UTC+1)		(HT: 0-12 – 1-06)		Venue: Chadwicks Wexford Park
	Pts: Anthony Larkin 0-9 (4tpf, 1'45), Liam Ryan 0-2 (tp), Darragh Pepper 0-2 (1f), Oisín Pepper 0-1, Floyd Murphy 0-1, Alan Tobin 0-1	Report	Pts: Cian Byrne 1-3 (1tpf), Richie Waters 0-6 (1f), John Turbitt 0-5 (2tpf), Jake Molloy 0-1	Referee: Brendan Martin (Ballyhogue)

=== Quarter-Finals ===
3 October 2025 Quarter-Final 1	Castletown Liam Mellows	1-21 (24) – (15) 1-12	HWH–Bunclody	Wexford
19:30 IST (UTC+1)		(HT: 1-09 – 0-07)		Venue: Chadwicks Wexford Park
	Pts: Jonathan Bealin 1-8 (2tpf, 3f), Darragh Brooks 0-3 (1tpf, 1'45), Jack Higgins 0-3, Liam Coleman 0-2 (tp), Rory Heffernan 0-1, Gavin Kelly 0-1, Robbie Brooks 0-1, Donnacha Holmes 0-1, Doran Daly-O'Toole 0-1	Report	Pts: Aidan Nolan 0-8 (4'45, 1tpf, 1f), Keith O'Hara 1-0, Ciarán Regan 0-2, Edward Dunbar 0-2	Referee: Thomas Furlong (Adamstown)

4 October 2025 Quarter-Final 2	Glynn–Barntown	2-08 (14) – (29) 1-26	Gusserane O'Rahilly's	Wexford
17:30 IST (UTC+1)		(HT: 2-02 – 0-18)		Venue: Chadwicks Wexford Park
	Pts: John Leacy 0-6 (2tp, 1tpf), Cormac Cooney 1-0, Michael O'Regan 1-0, Matthew Joyce 0-1, Connor Mackey 0-1	Report	Pts: Mark Rossiter 0-17 (4tpf, 2tp, 2f), Seán O'Connor 1-0, Graeme Cullen 0-2, Mark O'Neill 0-2 (tp), Páraic Conway 0-2, Gavin Sheehan 0-1, Seán Ryan 0-1, Evan Kiely 0-1	Referee: James Murray (St Mary's)

5 October 2025 Quarter-Final 3	Kilanerin–Ballyfad	5-17 (32) – (18) 2-12	Crossabeg–Ballymurn	Wexford
15:15 IST (UTC+1)		(HT: 4-14 – 0-02)		Venue: Chadwicks Wexford Park
	Pts: Séan Forde 4-4 (2f, 1tpf), Cian Hughes 1-2, Niall Hughes 0-4 (2tp), Conor Kinsella 0-3 (1tp), Páraic Hughes 0-2 (tp), Seán Hughes 0-1, Dean O'Toole 0-1	Report	Pts: Ronan Devereux 1-5 (2f, 1tpf, 1'45), Mark O'Connor 1-1, Bill Eviston 0-2 (tp), Cian Kinlough 0-2, James Dixon 0-1, Ben Turner 0-1 ('45)	Referee: Seán Whelan (St Martin's)

5 October 2025 Quarter-Final 4	Shelmaliers	0-21 (21) – (14) 1-11	Naomh Éanna	Wexford
17:00 IST (UTC+1)		(HT: 0-14 – 1-05)		Venue: Chadwicks Wexford Park
	Pts: Eoghan Nolan 0-10 (4f, 1tpf, 1tp, 1'45), Conor Hearne 0-5 (2tp), Paul Hearne 0-2 (tp), Hugh Peter Manley 0-1, Glen Malone 0-1, Aaron Murphy 0-1, Brian Malone 0-1	Report	Pts: Rian Fitzpatrick 0-6 (1tpf, 1tp, 1f), Cian Molloy 1-0, Jack Doran 0-2, Ruairí Martin 0-1, Dylan Cooke-Leonard 0-1, Cian Browne 0-1,	Referee: Stephen Burke (Volunteers)

=== Semi-Finals ===
19 October 2026 Semi-Final 1	Gusserane O'Rahilly's	0-11 (11) – (20) 2-14	Castletown Liam Mellows	Wexford
15:00 IST (UTC+1)		(HT: 0-09 – 2-05)		Venue: Chadwicks Wexford Park
	Pts: Mark Rossiter 0-6 (2tpf, 1tp), Graeme Cullen 0-3 (1tp), Cormac Kiely 0-2	Report	Pts: Jonathan Bealin 0-5 (3f), Gavin Kelly 1-0, Killian Pierce 1-0, Jack Higgins 0-3, Liam Coleman 0-2 (tp), Darragh Brooks 0-1 (f), Colin Kennedy 0-1, Conor Carty 0-1, Robbie Brooks 0-1	Referee: James Owens (Kilrush)

19 October 2025 Semi-Final 2	Kilanerin–Ballyfad	0-13 (13) – (18) 1-15	Shelmaliers	Wexford
16:45 IST (UTC+1)		(HT: 0-07 – 0-12)		Venue: Chadwicks Wexford Park
	Pts: Niall Hughes 0-3 (1tp, 1f), Seán Forde 0-3 (3f), Páraic Hughes 0-2, Cian Hughes 0-2, Seán Hughes 0-1, Brendan Bolger 0-1, Daniel Bolger 0-1	Report	Pts: Eoghan Nolan 0-5 (1tpf, 2f, 1'45), Eoghan O'Gara 1-0, Simon Donohoe 0-2 (tp), Glen Malone 0-2 (tp), Conor Hearne 0-2 (tp), Aidan Cash 0-2 (tp), Jody Donohoe 0-1, Paul Hearne 0-1	Referee: Seán Whelan (St Martin's)

== Final ==
2 November 2025 Final	Castletown Liam Mellows	0-14 (14) – (10) 1-07	Shelmaliers	Wexford
15:30 GMT (UTC+0)		(HT: 0-07 – 0-04)		Venue: Chadwicks Wexford Park
	Pts: Jonathan Bealin 0-4 (1f), Conor Carty 0-2 (tp), Darragh Brooks 0-2 (tpf), Donnacha Holmes 0-2, Colin Kennedy 0-1, Liam Coleman 0-1, Rory Heffernan 0-1, Brendan Halpin 0-1	Report	Pts: Conor Hearne 0-3 (1tp), Graham Staples 1-0, Glen Malone 0-3 (3f), Simon Donohoe 0-1	Referee: Thomas Furlong (Adamstown)
