= Anthony Masterson =

Wexford Gaelic football goalkeeper

Personal information
- Native name: Antoine Mac an Mháighistir (Irish)
- Born: 5 January 1983 (age 43) Castletown, County Wexford
- Height: 6 ft 3 in (191 cm)

Sport
- Sport: Gaelic football
- Position: Goalkeeper
Club
- Years: Club
- 2000–2016: Castletown Liam Mellows
Club titles
- Wexford titles: 1
Inter-county
Years	County	Apps (scores)
2003–2016	Wexford	1
Inter-county titles
- NFL: 1

Anthony Masterson (born 5 January 1983) is an Irish former sportsman who played Gaelic football for Wexford Senior Football Championship club Castletown Liam Mellows and, since making his debut in 2005, the Wexford senior team. Before joining the senior panel, he was a Leinster Junior Championship with Wexford, and later played in the All Ireland final but lost out to Cork.

On 23 October 2016, Masterson retired because of a long-standing injury.
