= Cathal Ryan =

Irish Gaelic footballer

Personal information
- Native name: Cathal Ó Riain (Irish)
- Born: 16 October 1985 (age 41) Portlaoise, Ireland

Sport
- Sport: Gaelic football
- Position: Full Back
Club
- Years: Club
- ? -?: Portarlington
Inter-county
- Years: County
- 2004-2011: Laois

Cathal Ryan is a Gaelic footballer from County Laois, Ireland.

He usually plays at full back for Laois and in 2003 was part of the Laois team that won the All-Ireland Minor Football Championship title for the first time since 1997. The following year he made his senior inter-county championship debut in an ill-fated qualifier defeat at the hands of Tyrone in Croke Park. In 2006, Cathal was part of the Laois team that won the Leinster U21 Football Championship.

He also plays for his home town club Portarlington where his position varies from midfield to defence.
