= Jack Savage (Gaelic footballer) =

Kerry Gaelic footballer

Jake Savage is a Gaelic footballer. He plays for the Kerins O'Rahilly's club and at senior level for the Kerry county team. He came on as a blood substitute in the 2022 All-Ireland Senior Football Championship Final. Kerry won that game, earning Savage an All-Ireland Senior Football Championship medal. As of 2023, he was reportedly "set to emigrate to Dubai" and would miss the 2023 season.

He got involved in every 2022 National League game and then in the National Football League was one over Mayo and a sub for Paudie Clifford against Galway in the 2022 All-Ireland Senior Football Championship Final.

After he won he traveled with Kerins O'Rahilly's clubmate Cormac Coffey to the Middle East. He is an attacker.

His loss was a blow for Kerry's defence.
