= Lily of the valley tree =

Lily of the valley tree is a common name for several trees and may refer to:

- Clethra arborea, shrub or small tree native to Madeira in the family Clethraceae
- Crinodendron patagua, tree native to Chile in the family Elaeocarpaceae
- Oxydendrum arboreum, tree native to the southeastern United States in family Ericaceae
