= Irish Farmers Journal =

Irish weekly farming newspaper

- Type: Weekly
- Format: Tabloid
- Owner(s): The Agricultural Trust
- Editor: Jack Kennedy
- Founded: 1948
- Headquarters: Irish Farm Centre, Bluebell, Dublin 12
- City: Dublin
- Country: ireland
- ISSN: 2009-4604
- Website: farmersjournal.ie

The Irish Farmers Journal is a weekly agricultural newspaper (published Thursdays) which provides farming news, specialist advice, market data and country living features to the Irish agricultural industry. As of October 2019, it reportedly had a weekly readership of 263,000. It is the largest selling agricultural publication in both Ireland and the UK, and it had a weekly circulation sale of 62,226 copies at the end of 2018.

It is owned by The Agricultural Trust, which also owns The Irish Field. The Irish Farmers Journal is the only agricultural publication which operates as a legal Trust.

Its ownership structure provides it with the ability to make significant investments in editorial content. An example of this is Tullamore Farm, a model farm designed to test farming practices to improve efficiency.

Laois gardening expert Lily Champ has been a regular columnist for Irish Farmers Journal.

== Awards ==
Awards won by the Irish Farmers Journal include:

Award	Year	Organisation
Digital Excellence Award	2018	Newsbrands Ireland
Media Brand of the Year	2017	Newsbrands Ireland
