= The Irish Field =

Irish bloodstock, racing and sport horse publication

- Type: Weekly
- Editor: Leo Powell
- Founded: 1870
- Headquarters: Irish Farm Centre, Bluebell, Dublin 12.
- Website: www.theirishfield.ie

The Irish Field is an Irish bloodstock, racing and sport horse publication. Established in 1870 and originally known as the Irish Sportsman and Farmer, it was published by The Irish Times from the 1930s until 2003. The publication was acquired by The Agricultural Trust, owners of the Irish Farmers Journal, in July 2003.

== Publication ==
The newspaper is published every Saturday, and includes racing, bloodstock and sport horse news, interviews, horse management advice, pedigree analysis, racecards and classified advertising.

A directory is usually published by The Irish Field in December each year, and includes contacts for trainers, jockeys, racecourses, equestrian organisations and clubs.
