= Portarlington GAA =

GAA club in County Laois, Ireland

Portarlington
- Cúil an tSúdaire
- Founded: 1893
- County: Laois
- Nickname: Port
- Colours: Maroon jersey and green sash, white shorts
- Grounds: McCann Park
- Coordinates: 53°08′56″N 7°10′46″W

Playing kits
Standard colours

Senior Club Championships
	All Ireland	Leinster champions	Laois champions
Football:	-	-	18

Portarlington GAA is a Gaelic Athletic Association (GAA) club affiliated predominantly Gaelic football club with underage hurling up to U/17 level. It is based in the town of Portarlington in County Laois, Ireland.

== Grounds ==
Portarlington GAA club is based at McCann Park. The club's grounds are named after former member Pat McCann. McCann Park was used as the venue for the 1979 All-Ireland Senior Ladies' Football Championship final replay, where Offaly defeated Tipperary.

The main stand in the ground was built and named in the memory of Portarlington footballer Colm Maher who died in June 1996. This stand has a capacity of 1,012 people (all seated).

== Hurling ==
Although Portarlington are a predominantly football club, they have had adult hurling teams in the past and reached finals of the Junior Hurling Championship in 1937, 1946 and 1960. As of the 21st century, Portarlington fields hurling teams up to U17. At adult level, hurlers from Portarlington play with Mountmellick for adult and U20; This arrangement was in place, in April 2024, on the condition that it would change if Portarlington had enough numbers for their own adult team.

== Honours ==
=== Senior ===
- Laois Senior Football Championship (18): 1893, 1910, 1912, 1921, 1922, 1923, 1954, 1955, 1959, 1988, 1995, 2001, 2020, 2021, 2022, 2024, 2025, 2026

=== Intermediate ===
- Laois Intermediate Football Championship (4): 1945, 1955, 1990, 1991

=== Junior ===
- Laois Junior A Football Championship (8): 1919, 1921, 1924, 1925, 1931, 1954, 1968, 1983
- Laois Junior B Football Championship (1): 2026
- Laois Junior A Hurling Championship (0): (runners-up in 1937, 1946, 1960)

=== League ===
- ACFL Div 1 (4): 1988, 1989, 2021, 2023
- ACFL Div 3 (2): 1990, 2001

== Notable players ==
- Hugh Emerson
- Cathal Ryan
