= 2019 Wexford Senior Football Championship =

Wexford S.F.C.
- Season: 2019
- Champions: Castletown Liam Mellows (11th S.F.C. Title)
- Relegated: St Anne's Rathangan
- All Ireland SCFC: n/a
- Winning Manager: Timmy Walsh
- Winning Captain: Brendan Halpin
- Man of the Match: James Holmes
- Matches: 38

The 2019 Wexford Senior Football Championship is the 121st edition of the Wexford GAA's premier club Gaelic football tournament for senior graded teams in County Wexford, Ireland. The tournament consists of 12 teams, with the winner going on to represent Wexford in the Leinster Senior Club Football Championship. The championship starts with a group stage and then progresses to a knock out stage.

Shelmaliers were the defending champions after they defeated Kilanerin–Ballyfad in the previous years final after a replay to claim their first ever title. The defence of their title this season however came undone at the quarter-final stage when succumbing to Gusserane O'Rahilly's.

This was Horeswood's return to the senior grade after claiming the 2018 Wexford I.F.C. title. They made the straight bounce-back up to the senior grade, spending just one year as an Intermediate club after suffering relegation from the S.F.C. in 2017.

On 13 October 2019, Castletown Liam Mellows claimed their 11th Wexford S.F.C. crown when defeating Gusserane O'Rahilly's by 3-16 to 2-10 in the final at Wexford Park. This ended a nine year barren spell for the club and also brought them equal with St John's Volunteers at the top of the all time Wexford S.F.C. roll of honour.

St Anne's Rathangan were relegated to the 2020 I.F.C. after losing their Relegation Final to Kilanerin–Ballyfad. This ended their 29-year tenure in the senior ranks since their promotion in 1990.

== Team changes ==
The following teams have changed division since the 2018 championship season.

=== To S.F.C. ===
Promoted from 2018 Wexford I.F.C.

- Horeswood - (Intermediate Champions)

=== From S.F.C. ===
Relegated to 2019 Wexford I.F.C.

- Taghmon–Camross

== Group stage ==
There are 2 groups called Group A and B. The top 4 in each group qualify for the quarter-finals. The bottom finisher in each group will qualify for the Relegation Final.

=== Group A ===
Team	Pld	W	L	D	PF	PA	PD	Pts
St Martin's	5	4	1	0	84	72	+12	8
Castletown Liam Mellows	5	3	2	0	84	53	+31	6
St James'	5	3	2	0	72	74	-2	6
Gusserane O'Rahilly's	5	3	2	0	83	88	-5	6
Sarsfields	5	1	3	1	72	86	-14	3
Kilanerin–Ballyfad	5	0	4	1	67	89	-22	1

Round 1

- St James' 3-13, 1-16 Sarsfields, 29/3/2019,
- Gusserane O'Rahilly's 5-9, 1-16 Kilanerin–Ballyfad, 29/3/2019,
- St Martin's 1-15, 2-8 Castletown, 29/3/2019,

Round 2

- Castletown 0-17, 0-4 Gusserane O'Rahilly's, 5/4/2019,
- St James' 2-7, 1-9 Kilanerin–Ballyfad, 5/4/2019,
- St Martin's 0-15, 1-6 Sarsfields, 6/4/2019,

Round 3

- Gusserane O'Rahilly's 2-13, 1-12 St James', 3/8/2019,
- St Martin's 2-14, 0-14 Killanerin–Ballyfad, 6/8/2019,
- Castletown 2-18, 1-8 Sarsfields, 6/8/2019,

Round 4

- St Martin's 1-10, 0-10 St James', 25/8/2019,
- Sarsfields 2-13, 2-5 Gusserane O'Rahilly's, 25/8/2019,
- Castletown 2-12, 0-8 Killanerin–Ballyfad, 25/8/2019,

Round 5

- Gusserane O'Rahilly's 4-13, 2-12 St Martin's, 31/8/2019,
- St James' 1-9, 0-11 Castletown, 31/9/2019,
- Killanerin–Ballyfad 1-11, 1-11 Sarsfields, 31/9/2019,

=== Group B ===
Team	Pld	W	L	D	PF	PA	PD	Pts
Shelmaliers	5	2	0	3	81	67	+14	7
Glynn–Barntown	5	2	1	2	73	69	+4	6
Horeswood	5	2	2	1	80	80	+0	5
Starlights	5	2	2	1	72	73	-1	5
St Mogue's Fethard	5	2	2	1	66	69	-3	5
St Anne's Rathangan	5	0	3	2	67	81	-14	2

Round 1

- Glynn–Barntown 2-11, 1-14 Horeswood, 29/3/2019,
- Starlights 2-13, 0-13 St Anne's, 30/3/2019,
- Shelmaliers 2-12, 1-7 Fethard, 30/3/2019,

Round 2

- Glynn–Barntown 2-7, 0-12 Starlights, 6/4/2019,
- Fethard 2-12, 1-15 St Anne's, 7/4/2019,
- Shelmaliers 4-12, 3-9 Horeswood, 7/4/2019,

Round 3

- Glynn–Barntown 2-11, 1-7 St Anne's, 3/8/2019,
- Shelmaliers 0-14, 2-8 Starlights, 6/8/2019,
- Fethard 0-11, 0-7 Horeswood, 6/8/2019,

Round 4

- Fethard 2-11, 1-10 Glynn–Barntown, 24/8/2019,
- Shelmaliers 0-12, 0-12 St Anne's, 24/8/2019,
- Horeswood 2-17, 1-11 Starlights, 25/8/2019,

Round 5

- Starlights 2-7, 0-13 Fethard, 30/8/2019,
- Horeswood 2-9, 1-11 St Anne's, 30/8/2019,
- Shelmaliers 0-13, 2-7 Glynn–Barntown, 30/8/2019,

== Relegation final ==
The bottom finisher from both groups qualify for the Relegation final. The loser will be relegated to the 2020 Intermediate Championship.

- Killanerin–Ballyfad 2-14, 0-13 St Anne's Rathangan, Bellefield, 13/9/2019,

== Finals ==
The top 4 teams from each group qualify for the quarter-finals with 1st -vs- 4th and 2nd -vs- 3rd in each case.

=== Quarter-finals ===
- Glynn–Barntown 3-11, 1-8 St James', Wexford Park, 14/9/2019,
- St Martin's 0-13, 0-8 Starlights, Wexford Park, 14/9/2019,
- Castletown 3-15, 2-11 Horeswood, Wexford Park, 15/9/2019,
- Gusserane O'Rahilly's 2-18, 1-19 Shelmaliers, Wexford Park, 15/9/2019,

=== Semi-finals ===
- Castletown 1-10, 0-11 St Martin's, Wexford Park, 29/9/2019,
- Gusserane O'Rahilly's 2-12, 1-12 Glynn–Barntown, Wexford Park, 29/9/2019,

=== Final ===
- Castletown 3-16, 2-10 Gusserane O'Rahilly's, Wexford Park, 13/10/2019,
