= Hugh Emerson =

Irish Gaelic footballer

Personal information
- Nickname: Hughie
- Born: 12/9/1973 County Laois, Ireland
- Height: 6 ft 2 in (188 cm)

Sport
- Sport: Gaelic football
- Position: Full Forward
Club
- Years: Club
- ? -?: Portarlington
Club titles
- Laois titles: 2
Inter-county
- Years: County
- 1992-2003: Laois
Inter-county titles
- Leinster titles: 1
- All-Irelands: 1

Hugh Emerson is a former Gaelic footballer for Laois.

As an 18-year-old, he made his debut for Laois in a win over Meath in 1992. With his "long hair and powerful frame", he was one of the "darlings" of the Laois supporters throughout the 1990s.

He won a Leinster Senior Football Championship medal with Laois in 2003, having been persuaded out of his retirement announced in 2001. He also captained Laois to a Leinster Under 21 Football title in 1994.

He also won two Railway Cup medals with Leinster.

With his club, Portarlington, Emerson won two Laois Senior Football Championship medals in 1995 and 2001.
