= Castletown, County Wexford =

Castletown Baile an Chaisleáin
- Village
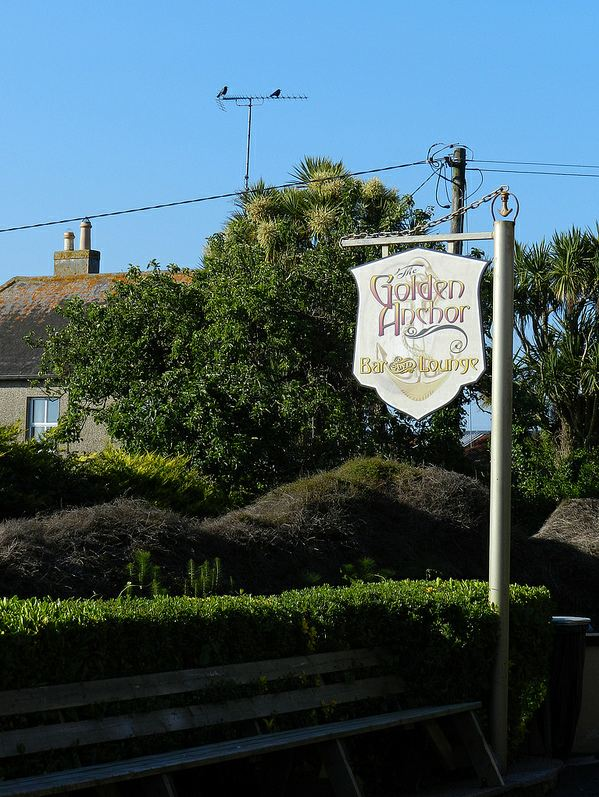
- Sign outside the Golden Anchor pub in Castletown

- Location in Ireland
- Coordinates: 52°43′23″N 6°11′20″W
- Country: Ireland
- Province: Leinster
- County: Wexford
- Time zone: UTC+0 (WET)
  - Summer (DST): UTC-1 (IST (WEST))
- Area code: 0402

Castletown, historically called Ballycaslane (Irish: Baile an Chaisleáin), is a small village and townland in northeast County Wexford, Ireland. It has a small national (primary) school and a Catholic church.

Castletown is in the parish of Kilgorman which contains one of the earliest Christian settlements in Ireland. Kilgorman was founded by St Gorman, who reputedly established a monastery in the area. This is possibly the same St Germanus after whom St German's Cathedral on St Patrick's Isle off the Isle of Man is named.

== Geography ==
Castletown is located, between the towns of Gorey and Arklow, at the foot of Tara Hill, County Wexford. It lies, within the civil parish of Kilgorman, on the boundary between counties Wicklow and Wexford. Located within a tourist area, Castletown is close to several beaches (Saleen, Clone, Kilpatrick and Kilmichael).

== History ==
Evidence of ancient settlement in the area includes a number of barrow, burial and moated sites in the townlands of Castletown, Monagarrow and Clones Middle. The current Catholic church in the area, Saint Patrick's Catholic Church (built in 1885 to designs by William Hague), replaced an earlier nearby structure (built 1806 and now in ruins).

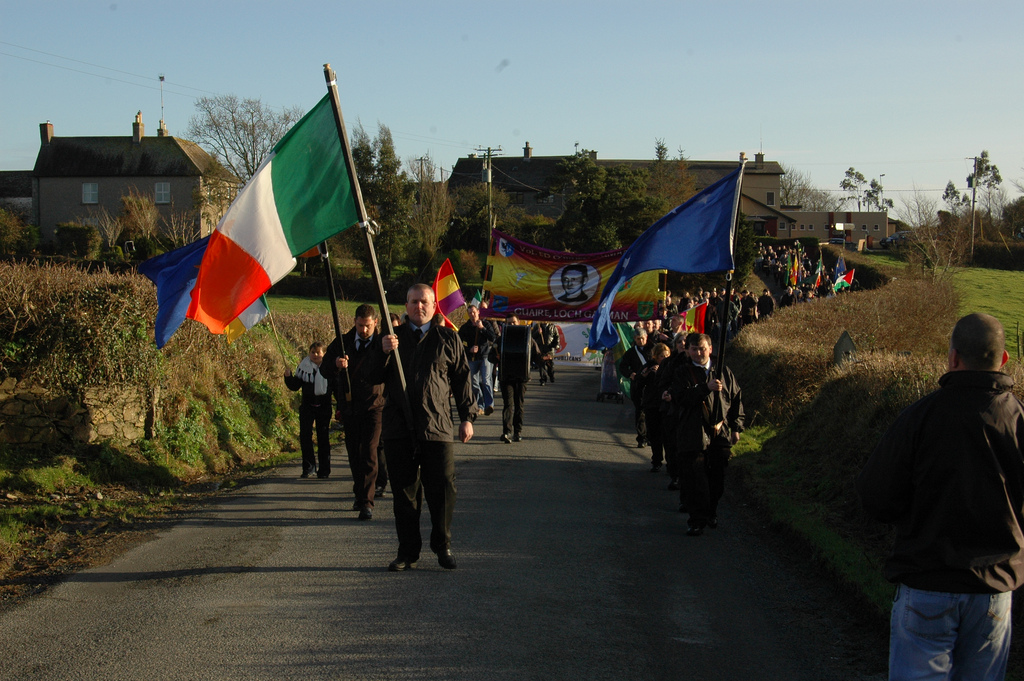
Flag bearers at the annual Liam Mellows commemoration in Castletown

Castletown was the Wexford headquarters of the Irish Republican Army during the Irish War of Independence. At that time, the IRA fighting columns who had been training nearby went for drinks in the Golden Anchor pub. Each year a commemorative rally is held in the village to honour those involved. The flag bearers lead proceedings from the pub to Castletown cemetery. The commemoration is named for Liam Mellows, whose grave is in Castletown cemetery.

== Sports ==
The local Gaelic Athletic Association (GAA) club, Castletown Liam Mellows GAA, is based between Castletown and the village of Tara Hill. It was a football-only club up until the 1960s when the decision was made to form a hurling club. The club, previously known as Castletown GAA club, was later renamed in honour of the executed Irish Republican, Liam Mellows. The club first won the Wexford Senior Football Championship in 1965. Castletown also has both Ladies football and camogie clubs.

== See also ==
- List of towns and villages in Ireland
