= Tara Hill, County Wexford =

Natural feature in southeast Ireland

Tara Hill
- Torrchoill
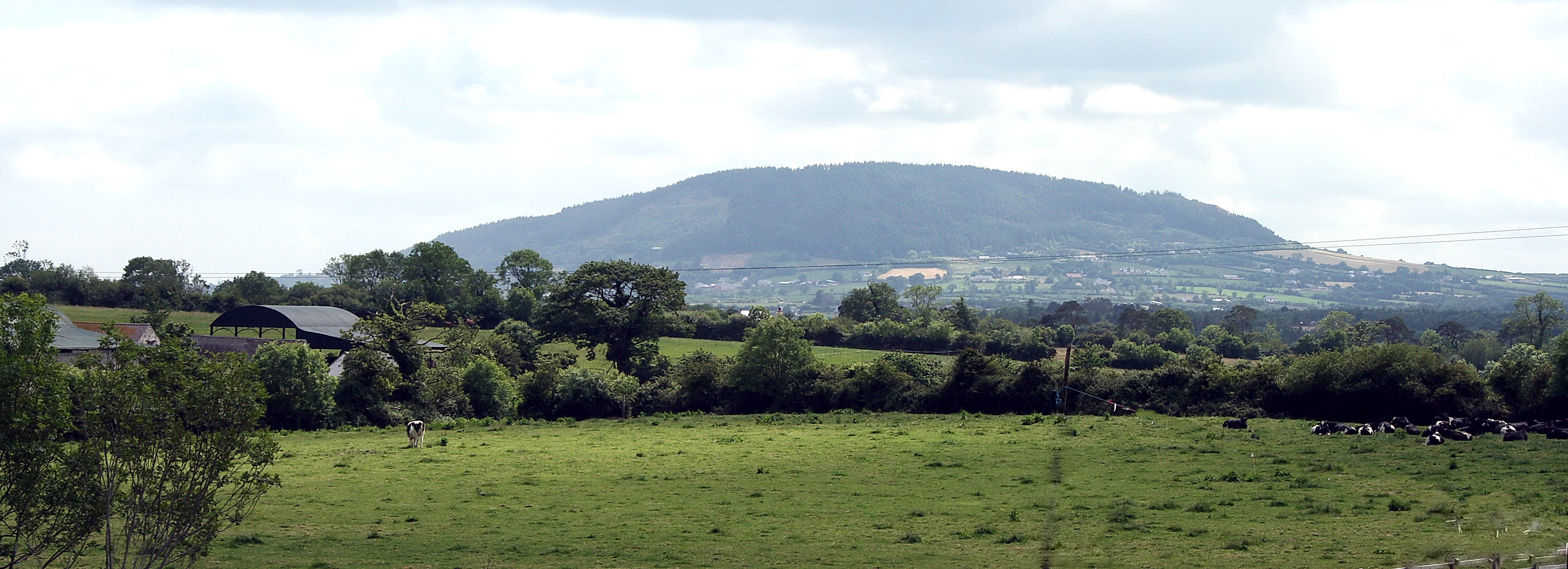
- Tara Hill, from the northwest

Highest point
- Elevation: 253 m (830 ft)
- Prominence: 198 m (650 ft)
- Listing: Marilyn
- Coordinates: 52.699°N 6.2177°W

Geography
- Location within island of Ireland
- Location: County Wexford, Ireland
- OSI/OSNI grid: T205623
- Topo map: OSi Discovery 62

Tara Hill (Irish: Torrchoill) is an isolated hill and associated village near the Irish Sea coast in north County Wexford, Ireland. Though only 253 metres (830 feet) high, it dominates the landscape of northeast Wexford. It overlooks the Wexford coast line, from Courtown harbour to Castletown.

== Geography ==
Tara Hill is situated at a particularly high point along the south east coast of Ireland and is surrounded by flat residential and agricultural land. Due to its height relative to the surrounding landscape, this hill qualifies as a Marilyn. It should not be confused with the much better known but much less prominent Royal Hill of Tara in County Meath, which is only 159m high.

The summit is marked by a cairn from where one can see nearby Gorey, Courtown and other villages and townlands and views of the North Wexford coast. Though only 253 metres high, it dominates the landscape of northeast Wexford and can be seen from Gorey town centre, which is approximately 7.1 km away.

There is a small settlement on the hill.

== History ==
Saint Caemhan or Kevin or Cavan, as the name is variously spelt, is the patron saint of Tara Hill. The site of the old church, reputedly founded by Kevin, is situated at Kilcavan at the north side of the hill under a cliff by the road.

In 2009, the community in Tara Hill and Ballymoney announced plans to produce a new book on the social history of the area. A 'Minding Memories' night was held in Tara Hill in which locals recorded their memories of the area.

== Amenities ==
While not considered a village, Tara Hill is home to a church and a primary school (St Kevins) and a number of businesses. The closest villages to Tara Hill are Castletown, Ballymoney and Courtown. Nearby Gorey serves as a market town for the area.

Tara Hill has two main walking trails around the Marilyn starting close to the village centre. The area is linked to Dublin via the M11/N11 National Primary Route, and the national rail network from Gorey connects it to Rosslare Europort.

St. Kevins Catholic church is located at Kilcavan Lower townland in Tara Hill. The local national (primary) school, St. Kevin's National School, is also named for St. Kevin.

== Tourism ==
The area has a number of beaches, including Clone Strand and nearby Ballymoney Beach. There are two trails on Tara Hill, starting from two different trailheads (Crab Tree – Blue and Cemetery – Red). The Red Slí an tSuaimhnais trail begins from Tara Hill cemetery just beyond the village itself. The Blue Slí na n-Óg trail, beginning from the Ballinacarrig parking place (known locally as the Crab Tree) goes to the higher slopes of Tara Hill itself.

There are a number of bed-and-breakfast establishments in the area and in Ballymoney.

== Sport ==
The local Gaelic Athletic Association (GAA) club, Castletown Liam Mellows GAA, is located on the border between Tara Hill and Castletown townland.

== See also ==
- List of towns and villages in Ireland
