= Áine Wall =

Irish Gaelic footballer

Personal information
- Native name: Áine de Bhál (Irish)
- Born: 1970 (age 55–56)

Sport
- Sport: Ladies' Gaelic football
- Position: right wing forward, left corner forward, full forward
Club
- Years: Club
- Ballymacarbry LGFC
Club titles
- All-Ireland Titles: 10
Inter-county
- Years: County
- 1989–2003: Waterford
Inter-county titles
- All-Irelands: 5
- All Stars: 8

Áine Wall (married name Áine Moore; born 1970) is an Irish sportswoman. She played ladies' Gaelic football with her local club, Ballymacarbry, and with her county, Waterford.

== Sporting career ==
Wall won five All-Ireland Senior Ladies' Football Championships with Waterford, in 1991, 1992, 1994, 1995 and in the first televised final in 1998. She won eight Ladies' Gaelic Football All Stars Awards, appearing on the all-star team in 1989–1994, 1996 and 1998.

With her club, Ballymacarbry, she won ten All-Ireland Ladies' Club Football Championships.

In 2020, Cliona Foley (Irish Independent) named Wall as the 3rd greatest ladies' football player of all time (behind Cora Staunton and Mary Jo Curran). Wall was inducted into the Gaelic Writers' Association Hall of Fame in 2022.

== Media ==
She will be the subject of a 2023 episode of Laochra Gael. Publicity for the documentary said that "as a result of the heroics of Áine and her friends, the sport, which had never even been broadcast when she started out, gained attention and respect. One of the greatest ever footballers, who revolutionised Ladies Football."

== Personal life ==
Wall is a keen golfer and a member of Clonmel Golf Club.
