= Begley =

Begley is an anglicized Irish surname, derived from the Irish Ó Beaglaoich, and occasionally an anglicized form of the German-Jewish surname Begleiter. Notable people with the surname include:

- Adam Begley (born 1959), American author, son of Louis Begley
- Andrea Begley, Northern Irish singer, winner of The Voice UK
- Colm Begley (born 1986), Irish Gaelic footballer and Australian rules footballer
- Ed Begley (1901–1970), American film actor
- Ed Begley Jr. (born 1949), American film actor and environmentalist, son of actor Ed Begley
- Louis Begley (born 1933), American lawyer and novelist
- Michael Begley (disambiguation)
- Owen M. Begley (1906–1981), American politician
- Paul Begley, Irish Gaelic football player
- Séamus Begley (1949–2023), Irish accordion player and singer
- Sharon Begley, American science journalist
- Tadhg Begley, American chemist
- Thomas Begley (1970–1993), Provisional Irish Republican Army volunteer killed in the Shankill Road Bombing in West Belfast
- Tim Begley (born 1983), American professional basketball player

== See also ==
- Beagley, another surname
