= Sean Delaney (sportsman) =

Sean "Goggie" Delaney (1949 – 12 April 2004) was a Gaelic games sportsman from County Laois, Ireland.

Delaney was an inter-county goalkeeper and corner-forward with Laois GAA, and a senior goalkeeper with Portlaoise GAA hurlers. He was also a League of Ireland footballer with Shamrock Rovers, Shelbourne and St. Patrick's Athletic.

Later in his career as a manager to the Laois ladies' Gaelic football team, he guided the county to its first All-Ireland Senior Ladies' Football Championship title in 2001.

== Early life ==
The son of Morgan and Mai Delaney, Delaney spent his early years in Portlaoise and attended St Mary's CBS where he won a number of underage titles.

With the Portlaoise hurlers, he won Laois Minor Hurling Championship titles in 1964 and 1965, and at 17 played in the Laois Junior Hurling Championship decider defeating Camross in 1965. He was in goal for Laois in 1966 All-Ireland Minor Football Championship final, a match which Laois lost to Down.

As a soccer player, Delaney was a free kick specialist. On his debut for Shamrock Rovers, he scored twice, once from a free kick. Upon scoring he was reputed to have turned to the crowd and said "If you want to see another one like that, I'm in Portlaoise next Sunday at 3 o' clock".

== Senior GAA career ==
Delaney was selected as the number one goalkeeper for Portlaoise GAA club, and he was in this position for the club's four-in-a-row campaign from 1981 to 1984.

He also played club hurling with Park–Ratheniska where he won a Laois Junior Hurling Championship title in 1971 and a Laois Intermediate Hurling Championship in 1977.

He played senior football with Stradbally GAA, and won a Division One league medal with the club.

At the end of his playing career, he turned to coaching, and coached football, hurling, camogie and ladies football teams at several County Laois clubs.

== Family and later life ==
His father Morgan played on the Laois team that won the 1946 Leinster Senior Football Championship title, and in 2003 his son Damien Delaney lined out on the team which regained the Leinster Senior Football Championship title - after a gap of 57 years.

Delaney died suddenly in 2004, aged 55.
