= 1937 All-Ireland Senior Football Championship =

Football championship

All-Ireland Champions
- Winning team: Kerry (12th win)
- Captain: Miko Doyle

All-Ireland Finalists
- Losing team: Cavan
- Captain: Tom O'Reilly

Provincial Champions
- Munster: Kerry
- Leinster: Laois
- Ulster: Cavan
- Connacht: Mayo

Championship statistics

The 1937 All-Ireland Senior Football Championship was the 51st staging of Ireland's premier Gaelic football knock-out competition. In the All Ireland semifinal Cavan ended Mayo's day as All Ireland Champions. Kerry won the title.

== Results ==
=== Connacht Senior Football Championship ===
16 May 1937
Quarterfinal

Sligo	2–10 – 1–6	Roscommon

Castlerea
Attendance: 2,000

13 June 1937
Semifinal

Galway	3–1 – 0–2	Sligo

Castlerea

==== Final ====
18 July 1937
Final

Mayo	3–5 – 0–8	Galway
P Flannelly (0–1), J Carney (0–2, one free), P Laffey (1–1); J Munnelly (1–0), P Munnelly (0–1) & sub M Hannon (0–1).

St. Coman's Park, Roscommon
Attendance: 15,000

=== Leinster Senior Football Championship ===
30 May 1937
Preliminary Round

Meath	3–9 – 2–3	Westmeath

Kells

6 June 1937
Preliminary Round Replay

Wexford	2–7 – 1–4	Carlow

Nowlan Park, Kilkenny

9 May 1937
Quarterfinal

Kildare	5–11 – 1–7	Wicklow
P.Byrne 2–6, T.Mulhall, W.Ryan 1–0, J.Martin, P.Bourke 0–2.

Dr. Cullen Park, Carlow

16 May 1937
Quarterfinal

Laois	2–6 – 1–9	Offaly

St. Conleth's Park, Newbridge
Referee: P Waters (Kildare)

23 May 1937
Quarterfinal

Dublin	1–7 – 0–10	Louth

Páirc Tailteann, Navan

30 May 1937
Quarterfinal Replay

Laois	2–7 – 1–7	Offaly

Geraldine Park, Athy
Attendance: 8000
Referee: P Waters (Kildare)

20 June 1937
Quarterfinal

Wexford	3–7 – 1–8	Meath

Croke Park, Dublin

20 June 1937
Quarterfinal Replay

Dublin	1–4 – 2–5	Louth

Páirc Tailteann, Navan
Attendance: 10,000

4 July 1937
Semifinal

Wexford	0–6 – 1–5	Louth

Drogheda Park, Drogheda

11 July 1937
Semifinal

Laois	2–10 – 2–7	Kildare
		P.Byrne 1–5, T.Mulhall 1–0, M.Brosnan 0–1, P.Bourke 0–1.

Dr. Cullen Park, Carlow

==== Final ====
25 July 1937
Final

Laois	0-12–0-04	Louth
Tom Keogh 0-4 (0-1f), Mick Haughney 0-3, Danny Douglas and Tommy Murphy 0-2 each, Bill Delaney 0-1		James McKevitt (0-2f) and Harry Devine 0–2 each

Croke Park, Dublin
Attendance: 15,000
Referee: Martin Lynch (Carlow)

GK	1	Martin Farrell (Graiguecullen)
RCB	2	Joe Brennan (Edenderry, Offaly)
FB	3	Tom Delaney (Stradbally)
LCB	4	Dan Walsh (Army Metro, Dublin)
RHB	5	Chris Delaney (Tullamore, Offaly)
CHB	6	Mick Delaney (Stradbally)
LHB	7	Jim Slater (Graiguecullen)
MF	8	Jack Delaney (Stradbally) (c)
MF	9	Bill Delaney (Stradbally)
RHF	10	Danny Douglas (Army Metro, Dublin)
CHF	11	Tommy Murphy (Graiguecullen)
LHF	12	Syd Harkins (Army Metro, Dublin)
RCF	13	Mick Haughney (Graiguecullen)
FF	14	Tom Keogh (Portlaoise)
LCF	15	Jack McDarby (Graiguecullen)

GK	1	Hugh Callan (Dundalk Gaels)
RCB	2	Peter Martin (Wolfe Tones)
FB	3	Eddie Boyle (Cooley Kickhams)
LCB	4	Jim Culligan (Newtown Blues) (c)
RHB	5	Paddy McManus (Wolfe Tones)
CHB	6	Eugene Callan (Seán McDermott's, Dublin)
LHB	7	Jim Thornton (Cooley Kickhams)
MF	8	Jimmy Coyle (Seán McDermott's, Dublin)
MF	9	Paul Matthews (Athy, Kildare)
RHF	10	Mick Callaghan (Cooley Kickhams)
CHF	11	James McKevitt (Cooley Kickhams)
LHF	12	Paddy Cluskey (Darver Young Irelands)
RCF	13	Harry Devine (Seán McDermott's, Dublin)
FF	14	Paddy Hoey (Dundalk Gaels)
LCF	15	Patsy McKevitt (Cooley Kickhams)
Substitutes:
	16	Tom McKeown (Wolfe Tones) for Callan

=== Munster Senior Football Championship ===
16 May 1937
Quarterfinal

Tipperary	1–8 – 1–6	Waterford

Ned Hall Park, Clonmel
Referee: S. Moynihan (K)

13 June 1937
Quarterfinal

Kerry	6–7 – 0–4	Cork
Paddy Kennedy (0–2), Charlie O'Sullivan (0–1), Con Geaney (1–3), Sean McCarthy (3–0) & Michael O'Gorman (2–1).		D. O'Connor (0–2) & A. Ricken (0–1).

Fitzgerald Stadium, Killarney

13 June 1937
Semifinal

Clare	2–3 – 1–6	Limerick

The Cricket Field, Kilrush

27 June 1937
Semifinal Replay

Clare	1–8 – 0–6	Limerick

Foynes

11 July 1937
Semifinal

Kerry	2–11 – 0–4	Tipperary
P. Kennedy (0–2), T. O'Leary (0–1), C. O'Sullivan (1–2), J. G. O'Gorman (0–1), C. Geaney (0–1), S. McCarthy (0–1) & M. Ferriter (1–3).

Mitchelstown
Referee: T. Greaney (W)

==== Final ====
18 July 1937
Final

Kerry	4–9 – 1–1	Clare
Tim O'Leary (1–3), Jimmy Gawksie O'Gorman (0–4), Con Geaney (0–1), Sean McCarthy (2–1) & Mick Ferriter (1–0).

Gaelic Grounds, Limerick

=== Ulster Senior Football Championship ===
6 June 1937
Quarterfinal

Donegal	3–8 – 0–6	Antrim

Bundoran

6 June 1937
Quarterfinal

Monaghan	4–12 – 0–8	Tyrone

Fr. Peter Campbell Park, Coalisland

13 June 1937
Quarterfinal

Cavan	3–11 – 2–6	Fermanagh

Brewster Park, Enniskillen
Attendance: 2,000

13 June 1937
Quarterfinal

Armagh	4–14 – 2–7	Down

Athletic Grounds, Armagh

27 June 1937
Semifinal

Cavan	2–12 – 1–4	Donegal

Breffni Park, Cavan

4 July 1937
Semifinal

Monaghan	1–3 – 2–12	Armagh

Athletic Grounds, Armagh
Attendance: 8,000

==== Final ====
25 July 1937
Final

Cavan	0–13 – 0–3	Armagh

St. Mary's Park, Castleblayney

=== All-Ireland Senior Football Championship ===
15 August 1937
Semifinal

Kerry	2–3 – 2–3	Laois
Tadhg Healy (0–1), Johnny Walsh (0–1), Con Geaney (1–1) & Sean McCarthy (1–0).

Cork Athletic Grounds, Cork

22 August 1937
Semifinal Replay

Kerry	2–2 – 1–4	Laois
Tim Landers (2–1) & Mikey Lyne (0–1).

Cusack Park, Mullingar

29 August 1937
Semifinal

Cavan	2–5 – 1–7	Mayo
		J Carney (0–2), J Munnelly (0–3), P Moclair (1–0), P Munnelly (0–1).

Croke Park, Dublin

==== Finals ====
26 September 1937
Final

Kerry	2–5 – 1–8	Cavan
Charlie O'Sullivan (0–1), Gearoid Fitzgerald (0–1), John Joe Landers (2–1), Tim O'Donnell Camp (0–1) & Tim Landers (0–1).		P. Boylan (1-0), M.J Magee (0-3), P. Delvin (0-2), J. Smallhorne, V. White & L. Blessing (0-1) each.

Croke Park, Dublin
Attendance: 52,325
Referee: M. Hennessy (Clare)

17 October 1937
Final Replay

Kerry	4–4 – 1–7	Cavan
Tim Landers (0–4), John Joe Landers (1–0), Miko Doyle (1–0) & Tim O'Leary (2–0).		L. Blessing (1-0) M.J. Magee (0-3), P. Delvin & V. White (0-2) each.

Croke Park, Dublin
Attendance: 51,234
Referee: M. Hennessy (Clare)

== Championship statistics ==
=== Miscellaneous ===
- Lettekenny's pitch is named O'Donnell Park after Hugh O'Donnell.
- Roscommon withdraw from Connacht championship until 1941.
- There was 3 replays in the Leinster Football championship 1 in the preliminary round game between Wexford vs Louth and 2 Quarterfinals between Offaly vs Laois and Dublin vs Louth.
- The last year that All Ireland Semifinals were no longer outside Rotation cycle.
