= Paul Begley =

Irish Gaelic footballer

Personal information
- Nickname: Deuce
- Born: Stradbally, County Laois
- Height: 5 ft 10 in (178 cm)

Sport
- Sport: Gaelic Football
- Position: Full Back
Club
- Years: Club
- 2000-: Stradbally
Club titles
- Laois titles: 1
Inter-county
Years	County	Apps (scores)
2005-	Laois	10 (0-1)

Paul Begley is a Gaelic footballer from County Laois.

He plays for the Stradbally club. He usually plays in defence for the Laois senior football team.

He went on to play for the Laois Under 21 team in 2002, 2003 and 2004 before earning a call up to the senior squad for the 2005 National Football League campaign

He won two Under 21 titles with Stradbally Parish Gaels and in 2005 was a prominent player as Stradbally won the Laois Senior Football Championship.

He is an older brother of ex-Brisbane Lions and current Laois star Colm Begley.
