= Gary Kavanagh =

Irish Gaelic footballer

Personal information
- Native name: Gary Ó Caomhánach (Irish)
- Born: 1979 (age 46–47) Stradbally, County Laois
- Height: 6 ft 0 in (183 cm)

Sport
- Sport: Gaelic football
- Position: Wing Forward
Club
- Years: Club
- Stradbally
Inter-county
- Years: County
- 2001-2012: Laois
Inter-county titles
- Leinster titles: 1

Gary Kavanagh is a former Gaelic footballer from County Laois.

Kavanagh played for the Stradbally club. He usually played at wing forward for the Laois senior football team. In 2003, Kavanagh was part of the Laois team that won the Leinster Senior Football Championship title for the first time since 1946.

Kavanagh emerged on to the inter-county GAA scene in 1997 as part of the Laois minor squad that retained the All-Ireland Minor Football Championship.

In 2006, he was named as captain of the Laois senior football team but did not hold down a regular starting place on the team.

In January 2012, Kavanagh called time on his inter-county career and has since moved into management having taken charge of Laois under 21s, Ballylinan, Gracefield and Courtwood.
