= 2017 All-Ireland Senior Ladies' Football Championship final =

2017 All-Ireland Senior Ladies' Football Final
- Event: 2017 All-Ireland Senior Ladies' Football Championship
Dublin	Mayo
4-11	0-11
- Dublin win their second All-Ireland title. Fourth successive appearance in the final by Dublin
- Date: 24 September 2017
- Venue: Croke Park, Dublin
- Player of the Match: Noëlle Healy
- Referee: Seamus Mulvihill (Kerry)
- Attendance: 46,286
- Weather: Sunny

The 2017 All-Ireland Senior Ladies' Football Championship Final featured Dublin and Mayo. Dublin also played Mayo in the 2017 men's All-Ireland final. This was only the second time that the two finals featured teams representing the same two counties; the first time was in 1982, when Kerry played Offaly in both the men's and ladies' finals.

Dublin ended their losing streak in All-Ireland finals with a dominant display of attacking football against Mayo. There was some drama in the first-half when in the 24th minute the Mayo goalkeeper, Yvonne Byrne, dragged down Sinéad Aherne. The referee, Seamus Mulvihill, awarded a penalty and sin-binned Byrne. However Mayo's substitute goalkeeper, Aisling Tarpey, subsequently saved the penalty taken by Aherne. The Dublin forwards were in top form. Despite missing the penalty, Aherne went on to score nine points. Niamh McEvoy and Carla Rowe scored 1–1 each and Noëlle Healy was named player of the match. Strong performances in defence by Sinéad Goldrick and Niamh Collins limited the impact of Cora Staunton. However despite this Mayo remained in contention until the last ten minutes. Three late goals, two from substitute Sarah McCaffrey and one from Carla Rowe, eventually put the result beyond doubt.

== Route to the Final ==
In the semi-finals, Mayo ended Cork's six year reign as All-Ireland champions when they defeated Cork 3–11 to 0–18. Dublin's route to the final was featured in a behind-the-scenes documentary, Blues Sisters, broadcast on RTÉ One on 28 November 2017.

== Attendance record ==
The attendance of 46,286 was a record for an All-Ireland Senior Ladies' Football Championship final. It was also the best attended women's sports final of 2017. The second best attended final was the 2017 FA Women's Cup Final which had an attendance of 35,271. It was also the best attended women's sporting event in Europe during 2017. A BBC Northern Ireland report declared it was "the highest attended women's sporting event in the world in 2017", describing the 2017 Solheim Cup, which was attended by 125,000, as a "tournament...held over three days".

== TV audience ==
In addition to breaking attendance records, the 2017 final also set a new TV audience record for TG4. An average of 303,800 people watched the final – the highest figure since the station started broadcasting women's finals in 2001. Viewing peaked at 5.24pm when 409,700 people were watching and the broadcast reached 563,000 viewers in total, accounting for 40% of the viewing public in the Republic of Ireland.

== Match info ==
24 September 2017

Dublin	4-11; 0-11	Mayo
Sinéad Aherne (0-9); Sarah McCaffrey (2-0); Carla Rowe (1-1); Niamh McEvoy (1-1)		Cora Staunton (0-7); Grace Kelly (0-2); Aileen Gilroy (0-1); Niamh Kelly (0-1)

Croke Park, Dublin
Attendance: 46,286
Referee: Seamus Mulvihill (Kerry)

== Teams ==
Manager: Mick Bohan Team: 1 Ciara Trant; 2 Martha Byrne; 3 Sinéad Finnegan; 4 Rachel Ruddy; 5 Sinéad Goldrick; 6 Niamh Collins; 7 Leah Caffrey; 8 Lauren Magee; 9 Olwen Carey; 10 Carla Rowe; 11 Lyndsey Davey; 12 Nicole Owens; 13 Sinéad Aherne (c); 14 Niamh McEvoy; 15 Noëlle Healy Substitutes: Deirdre Murphy for Finnegan (18); Fiona Hudson for Byrne (43); Sarah McCaffrey for Owens (50); Molly Lamb for McEvoy (53)	Manager: Frank Browne Team: 1 Yvonne Byrne; 2 Orla Conlon; 3 Sarah Tierney (c); 4 Martha Carter; 5 Rachel Kearns; 6 Marie Corbett; 7 Fiona Doherty; 8 Aileen Gilroy; 9 Fiona McHale; 10 Doireann Hughes; 11 Niamh Kelly; 12 Ciara Whyte; 13 Sarah Rowe; 14 Cora Staunton; 15 Grace Kelly Substitutes: Aisling Tarpey for Yvonne Byrne (24); Amy Dowling for Niamh Kelly (41); Shauna Howley for Grace Kelly (57)
