= Beagley =

Beagley is a surname. Notable people with the surname include:

- Henry Beagley (1805–?), English cricketer, brother of John and Thomas
- John Beagley (1800–1885), English cricketer, brother of Henry and Thomas
- John Beagley (Australian cricketer) (1933–2014)
- Joshua Beagley, guitarist with the 1990s Australian band Swoop
- Peter Beagley, birth name of Peter Head, Australian rock musician, pianist, and singer-songwriter
- Susan Beagley, actress in the British sitcom Hi-de-Hi!
- Thomas Beagley (1789–1858), English cricketer, brother of Henry and John

== See also ==
- Begley, another surname
