= Michelle Ryan (disambiguation) =

Michelle Ryan (born 1984) is an English actress.

Michelle Ryan may also refer to:

- Michelle Ryan (dancer), artistic director of Restless Dance Company, an Australian dance company based in Adelaide
- Michelle K. Ryan (born 1973), American psychologist and academic
- Michelle Ryan, Irish Gaelic footballer in the 2017 All-Ireland Senior Ladies' Football Championship
