= Stradbally GAA =

Stradbally GAA may refer to:

- Stradbally GAA (Laois), a sports club in Leinster, Ireland
- Stradbally GAA (Waterford), a sports club in Munster, Ireland
