= Anthony Maher =

Anthony Maher may refer to:

- Anthony Maher (Gaelic footballer) (born 1987), Gaelic football player with Kerry
- Anthony Maher (soccer) (born 1979), American soccer player
- Tony Maher (born 1945), Irish hurler
- Tony Maher (Gaelic footballer) (born 1969), former Gaelic football player from County Laois in Ireland
