= Cora Staunton =

Irish multi-code female footballer

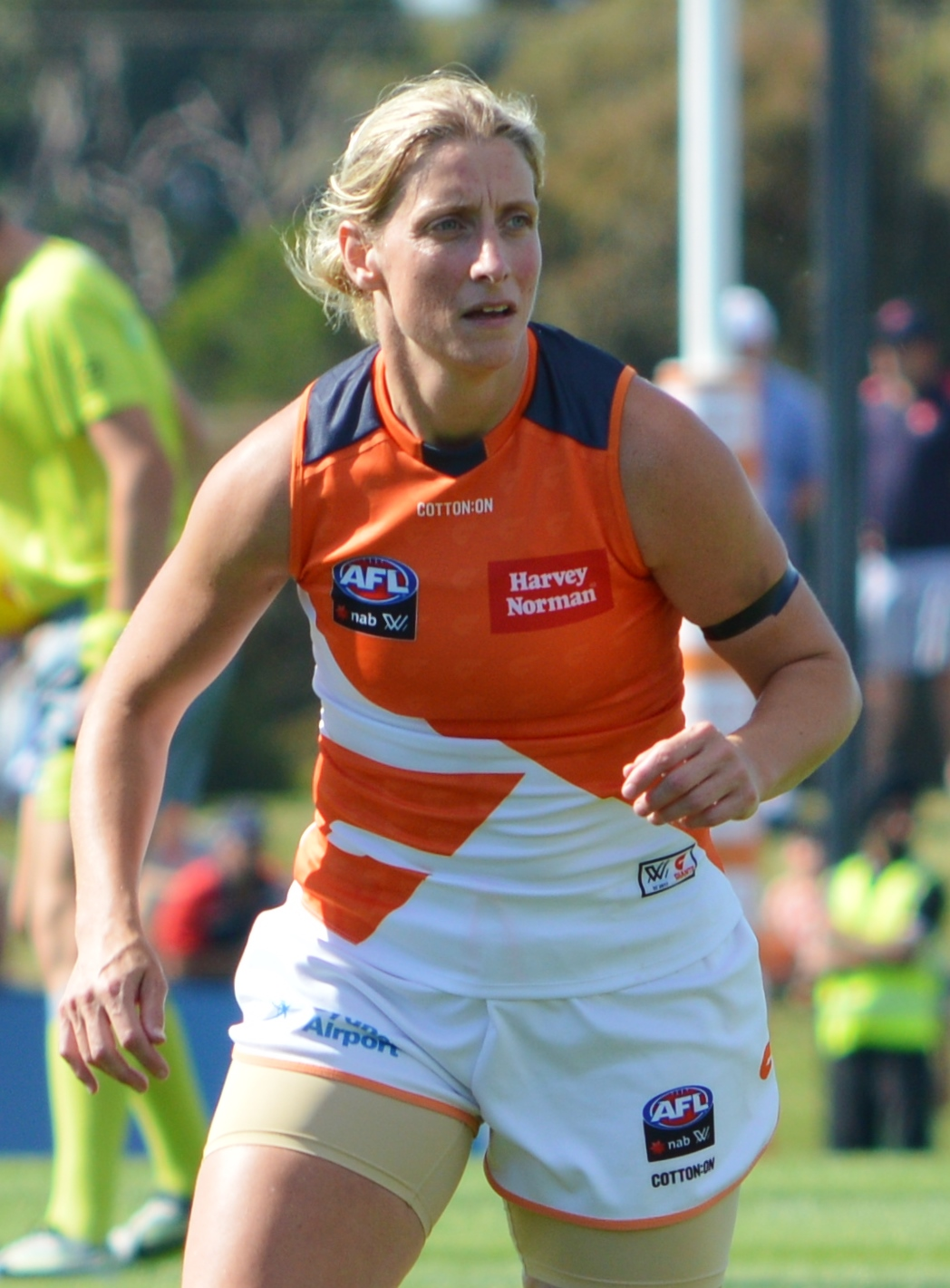
- Staunton playing Australian rules football with Greater Western Sydney in February 2018

Personal information
- Born: 13 December 1981 (age 44)
- Occupation: HSE Liaison Officer
- Height: 172 cm (68 in)

Sport
- Sport: Ladies' Gaelic football
- Position: Forward
Club
- Years: Club
- Carnacon
Inter-county
Years	County	Apps (scores)
1995–2018	Mayo	66 (59:476)
Inter-county titles
- All-Irelands: 4
- All Stars: 11

Cora Staunton (born 13 December 1981) is an Irish sportswoman. She is best known as a ladies' Gaelic footballer, winning four All-Irelands and three Ladies' National Football League titles with Mayo. She has also been an All Star on eleven occasions. In addition to playing Gaelic football, Staunton has also played three other football codes at a senior level. In 2006, as an association footballer, she won an FAI Women's Cup winner's medal with the Mayo Ladies' League representative team. In 2013, she began playing rugby union for Castlebar Ladies in the Connacht Women's League. In she 2018 made her Australian rules football debut in the AFLW competition for the Greater Western Sydney Giants, establishing herself by 2022 as one of the league's all-time great goalkickers. She has also played for the Ireland women's international rules football team. Staunton works as a HSE liaison officer, working with women from the Irish Travellers community.

In 2018, Staunton released her autobiography called Game Changer; it was named as the 2018 Bord Gáis Energy Sports Book of the Year.

== Early life ==
Staunton was raised in Carnacon, County Mayo. Her father was a farmer and her mother worked in the catering department of a local hospital. She has four brothers and three sisters and is the second youngest amongst her siblings. In 1995, her mother, Mary, was diagnosed with cancer. She died on 11 July 1998 when Staunton was 16. She is a former pupil of Ballinrobe Community School.

== Gaelic football ==
Staunton began playing Gaelic football at the age of seven in her local school in Carnacon. She later played with boys' teams in nearby Ballinrobe. Among her earliest teammates was Alan Dillon. Staunton made her debut at senior level for the Mayo county ladies' football team in 1995 aged just 13. She made her first appearance in an All-Ireland final in 1999. However, she played just 90 seconds of the game because she had broken her collarbone in training a week before the final. The team elected to start her anyway, as a ceremonial gesture. She made her second All-Ireland appearance in 2000, scoring 2:2 as Mayo defeated Waterford. Staunton's third All-Ireland appearance in 2001 ended in disappointment after a mix-up over a last minute kick-out saw Mayo lose by a single point to Laois. However Staunton and Mayo then won two successive All-Irelands in 2002 and 2003. Staunton played in a sixth All-Ireland in 2007. Staunton has also won six All-Ireland Ladies Club Football Championships with her club, Carnacon.

== Association football ==
Staunton played association football for Ballyglass Ladies in the Mayo Ladies League. As a youth she was invited to trials for the Republic of Ireland U–16s but she declined, preferring to concentrate on Gaelic football. However, she continued to play association football at club level. In 2006, she was a member of the Mayo Ladies League representative team that won the FAI Women's Cup, defeating UCD 1–0 in the final at Richmond Park. Staunton was just one of several members of the Mayo Ladies League representative team who also played Ladies Gaelic football for Mayo. Others included Yvonne Byrne, Aoife Herbert, Michelle Ruane, Martha Carter, Triona McNicholas and Emma Mullin. As a result of winning the 2006 FAI Women's Cup, the Mayo Ladies League qualified to represent the Republic of Ireland in the 2007–08 UEFA Women's Cup. The competition format saw the team travel to Austria in August 2007 to play in a mini-tournament to decide who would progress to the next round. Unfortunately the UEFA Women's Cup tournament clashed with a 2007 All-Ireland Senior Ladies' Football Championship quarter-final game against Monaghan. In the opening game of the tournament, Staunton scored for Mayo in a 4–1 defeat to Gol Częstochowa. However, she then returned to Ireland, along with Yvonne Byrne and Aoife Herbert, to line-up against Monaghan. While playing with Ballyglass Ladies, Staunton also won the 2011 WFAI Intermediate Cup.

== International rules football ==
Staunton was a member of the Ireland women's international rules football team that played against Australia in the 2006 Ladies' International Rules Series.

== Rugby union ==
In September 2013 Staunton made her rugby union debut for Castlebar Ladies in a Connacht Women's League game against Tuam. She subsequently scored seven tries in a 68–15 win. She also went onto captain Castlebar to the league title.

== Australian rules football ==
Cora Staunton

Personal information
- Born: 13 December 1981 (age 44)
- Original team: Greater Western Sydney
- Debut: Round 1, 2018, Greater Western Sydney vs. Melbourne, at Casey Fields
- Height: 172 cm (68 in)
- Position: Forward

Playing career^{1}
Years	Club	Games (Goals)
2018–2022 (S7)	Greater Western Sydney	50 (55)
- ^{1} Playing statistics correct to the end of 2022 season 7.

Career highlights
- 4× GWS leading goalkicker: 2020, 2021, 2022 (S6), 2022 (S7)

Staunton's decision to play Australian rules football came after a conversation with her compatriot Nick Walsh, an assistant coach at the Greater Western Sydney Giants. She was drafted by the Giants in the 2017 AFL Women's draft and was the first international player to be signed to an AFL Women's list.

In 2018 Staunton returned to Ireland to play for Mayo county during which time she was selected in the Ireland Banshees squad for the Euro Cup 9-a-side Australian rules tournament at Cork.

On 28 August 2022, she scored three goals in Greater Western Sydney's defeat to Western Bulldogs, a tally that included her 50th goal in the league, with only Darcy Vescio ahead of her.

In March 2023, Staunton retired from Australian rules football.

=== Statistics ===
Legend
G	Goals	K	Kicks	D	Disposals	T	Tackles
B	Behinds	H	Handballs	M	Marks

Cora Staunton AFLW statistics
Season	Team	No.	Games	Totals							Averages (per game)							Votes
Season	Team	No.	Games	G	B	K	H	D	M	T	G	B	K	H	D	M	T	Votes
2018	Greater Western Sydney	13	7	5	8	39	18	57	13	14	0.7	1.1	5.6	2.6	8.1	1.9	2.0	0
2019	Greater Western Sydney	13	7	6	4	65	31	96	19	24	0.9	0.6	9.3	4.4	13.7	2.7	3.4	6
2020	Greater Western Sydney	13	7	8	7	51	12	63	14	12	1.1	1.0	7.3	1.7	9.0	2.0	1.7	6
2021	Greater Western Sydney	13	9	10	10^{†}	64	29	93	18	18	1.1	1.1^{§}	7.1	3.2	10.3	2.0	2.0	
2022 (S6)	Greater Western Sydney	13	10	18	9	50	25	75	19	17	1.8	0.9	5.0	2.5	7.6	1.9	1.7	
2022 (S7)	Greater Western Sydney	13	10	8	5	38	33	71	13	21	0.8	0.5	3.8	3.3	7.1	1.3	2.1	
Career			50	55	43	307	148	455	96	106	1.1	0.9	6.1	3.0	9.1	1.9	2.1	

== Honours ==
=== Gaelic football ===
==== Individual ====
- Ladies' Gaelic football All Stars Awards
  - Winner: 2000, 2001, 2002, 2004, 2007, 2008, 2009, 2012, 2013, 2015, 2017: 11

==== Mayo ====
- All-Ireland Senior Ladies' Football Championship
  - Winner: 1999, 2000, 2002, 2003 : 4
  - Runners-up: 2001, 2007, 2017: 3
- Ladies' National Football League
  - Winners: 2000, 2004, 2007: 3
  - Runners-up: 2016

==== Carnacon ====
- All-Ireland Ladies Club Football Championship
  - Winner: 2002, 2007, 2010, 2011, 2013, 2017: 6
  - Runners-up: 2006, 2010, 2012: 3

=== Association football ===
==== Mayo ====
- FAI Women's Cup
  - Winner: 2006: 1

==== Ballyglass Ladies ====
- WFAI Intermediate Cup
  - Winners: 2011: 1

=== Rugby union ===
==== Castlebar Ladies ====
- Connacht Women's League
  - Winners: 2013: 1

=== Hanwell Mens ===
- Middlesex Merit Table Bowl
  - Winners: 2023: 1
