= 2002 All-Ireland Senior Ladies' Football Championship final =

2002 All-Ireland Senior Ladies' Football Final
- Event: 2002 All-Ireland Senior Ladies' Football Championship
Mayo	Monaghan
0–12	1–8
- Date: 29 September 2002
- Venue: Croke Park, Dublin

The 2002 All-Ireland Senior Ladies' Football Championship final was the 29th All-Ireland Final and the deciding match of the 2002 All-Ireland Senior Ladies' Football Championship, an inter-county ladies' Gaelic football tournament for the top teams in Ireland.

Mayo dominated the early part of the game, leading 0–5 to 0–0 after fifteen minutes, but an Edel Byrne goal helped Monaghan to a 1–5 to 0–7 half-time lead. Mayo won with a late point by super-sub Tríona McNichols.
