= 2016 Laois Senior Football Championship =

Laois S.F.C.
- Season: 2016
- Champions: Stradbally (18th S.F.C. Title)
- Relegated: Emo
- Leinster SCFC: Stradbally
- All Ireland SCFC: n/a
- Winning Captain: Jody Dillon and Colm Kelly
- Man of the Match: Damien Murphy
- Matches: 6

The 2016 Laois Senior Football Championship is the 126th edition of the Laois GAA's premier club Gaelic football tournament for senior graded teams in County Laois, Ireland. The tournament consists of 16 teams with the winner going on to represent Laois in the Leinster Senior Club Football Championship. The championship has a back-door format for the first two rounds before proceeding to a knock-out format. Generally, any team to lose two matches will be knocked out of the championship.

Portlaoise were the defending champions after they defeated Emo in the previous years final after a replay. However they lost their crown in the final this season when losing to Stradbally when a last gap goal handed them a 2-10 to 1-12 victory in O'Moore Park. This marked Stradbally's first S.F.C. title in 11 years and their 18th overall.

This was Clonaslee–St Manman's return to the senior grade after a three-year exodus since being relegated in 2012.

Emo were relegated after four years in the senior grade. Their demise was relatively surprising having only lost the Senior final the previous year, bringing Portlaoise to a replay.

== Team changes ==
The following teams have changed division since the 2015 championship season.

=== To S.F.C. ===
Promoted from I.F.C.

- Clonaslee–St Manman's - (Intermediate Champions)

=== From S.F.C. ===
Relegated to I.F.C.

- O'Dempsey's

== Round 1 ==
All 16 teams enter the competition in this round. The 8 winners progress to Round 2A while the 8 losers progress to Round 2B.

- Stradbally 2-19, 1-5 Clonaslee–St Manman's, O'Moore Park, 28/7/2016,
- Ballylinan 3-12, 2-12 Graiguecullen, O'Moore Park, 29/7/2016,
- Portlaoise 2-12, 0-6 The Heath, O'Moore Park, 30/7/2016,
- St Joseph's 4-11, 0-8 Ballyfin Gaels, O'Moore Park, 31/7/2016,
- Ballyroan Abbey 0-13, 0-9 Mountmellick Gaels, O'Moore Park, 31/7/2016,
- Crettyard Gaels 0-15, 0-14 Emo, O'Moore Park, 31/7/2016,
- Arles–Killeen 1-13, 1-9 Portarlington, O'Moore Park, 1/8/2016,
- Arles–Kilcruise 1-16, 0-6 Killeshin, O'Moore Park, 1/8/2016,

== Round 2 ==
=== Round 2A ===
The 8 winners from Round 1 enter this round. The 4 winners will enter the draw for the quarter-finals while the 4 losers will play in Round 3.

- Arles–Kilcruise 1-11, 1-10 St Joseph's, O'Moore Park, 11/8/2016,
- Ballyroan Abbey 0-16, 0-15 Ballylinan, O'Moore Park, 13/8/2016,
- Portlaoise 1-14, 1-8 Arles–Killeen, O'Moore Park, 13/8/2016,
- Stradbally 2-16, 0-7 Crettyard Gaels, O'Moore Park, 14/8/2016,

=== Round 2B ===
The 8 losers from Round 1 enter this round. The 4 winners will go into the Round 3 while the 4 losers will enter the Relegation Playoffs.

- Portarlington 2-17, 0-8 Graiguecullen, O'Moore Park, 12/8/2016,
- Ballyfin Gaels 4-17, 3-12 Emo, O'Moore Park, 14/8/2016,
- Mountmellick Gaels 2-12, 1-7 The Heath, O'Moore Park, 14/8/2016,
- Killeshin 4-16, 1-7 Clonaslee–St Manman's, O'Moore Park, 14/8/2016,

== Round 3 ==
The 4 losers from Round 2A enter this round and they play the 4 winners from Round 2B. The 4 winners will go into the draw for the quarter-finals.

- Arles–Killeen 3-14, 0-16 Killeshin, O'Moore Park, 27/8/2016,
- St Joseph's 3-8, 2-6 Mountmellick Gaels, O'Moore Park, 27/8/2016,
- Ballylinan 3-10, 1-13 Portarlington, O'Moore Park, 28/8/2016,
- Crettyard Gaels 2-11, 0-15 Ballyfin Gaels, O'Moore Park, 28/8/2016,

== Quarter-finals ==
| Quarter-Finals | | Semi-Finals | | Final |
| Portlaoise | 1-11; 0-12 |
| St Joseph's | 1-11; 1-5 | Portlaoise | 1-13 |
| Ballyroan Abbey | 2-10 | Arles–Killeen | 1-8 |
| Arles–Killeen | 3-10 | | | Portlaoise | 1-12 |
| Stradbally | 2-19 | | | Stradbally | 2-10 |
| Ballylinan | 0-12 | Stradbally | 1-14 |
| Crettyard Gaels | 1-15 | Crettyard Gaels | 0-8 |
| Arles–Kilcruise | 0-12 |

- Crettyard Gaels 1-15, 0-12 Arles–Kilcruise, O'Moore Park, 16/9/2016,
- Arles–Killeen 3-10, 2-10 Ballyroan Abbey, O'Moore Park, 17/9/2016,
- Portlaoise 1-11, 1-11 St Joseph's, O'Moore Park, 17/9/2016,
- Stradbally 2-19, 0-12 Ballylinan, O'Moore Park, 18/9/2016,
- Portlaoise 0-12, 1-5 St Joseph's, O'Moore Park, 23/9/2016, (Replay),

== Semi-finals ==
- Stradbally 1-14, 0-8 Crettyard Gaels, O'Moore Park, 2/10/2016,
- Portlaoise 1-13, 1-8 Arles–Killeen, O'Moore Park, 2/10/2016,

== Final ==
16 October 2016
15:30pm
Final

| Stradbally | 2-10 - 1-12 | Portlaoise |
|---|---|---|
| Gary Comerford 1-5 (0-2f), Jody Dillon 1-1, John Donoghue 0-2, Colm Begley and Padraig Fitzpatrick 0-1 each | Report | Paul Cahillane 0-5 (0-2f), Brian McCormack 1-0, Brian Smyth, Craig Rogers (0-1f), David Seale, Brian Mulligan, Gareth Dillon, Stuart Nerney, Adrian Kelly 0-1 each |

O'Moore Park
Referee: Eddie Kinsella (Courtwood)

== Relegation playoff ==
=== Relegation Semi-Finals ===
- The Heath 0-13, 0-13 Graiguecullen, O'Moore Park, 27/8/2016,
- Clonaslee–St Manman's 6-9, 0-24 Emo, Portarlington, 27/8/2016,
- Graiguecullen 1-15, 0-8 The Heath, Stradbally, 31/8/2016, (Replay)

=== Relegation Final ===
- The Heath 0-15, 2-8 Emo, Portarlington, 16/9/2016,
