= Laois–Offaly Gaelic football rivalry =

Laois-Offaly
- Location: County Laois; County Offaly
- Teams: Laois; Offaly
- First meeting: Laois 1-5 - 0-2 Offaly; 1903 Leinster quarter-final (21 August 1904)

Statistics
- Total meetings: 31
- Most wins: Laois (15)
- Top scorer: 2026 Leinster Preliminary Round (11 April 2026)
- All-time series: Laois 15-5-10 Offaly
- Largest victory: Laois 5-11 - 0-4 Offaly; 1947 Leinster semi-final (6 July 1947)

The Laois-Offaly rivalry is a Gaelic football rivalry between Irish county teams Laois and Offaly, who first played each other in 1903. It is considered to be one of the biggest local rivalries in Gaelic games. Laois's home ground is O'Moore Park and Offaly's home ground is O'Connor Park.

While both teams are regarded as minnows within the Leinster Senior Football Championship, they have enjoyed some success winning 16 provincial titles between them.

== Statistics ==
Up to date as of 2022 season

Team	All-Ireland	Provincial	National League	Total
Laois	0	6	2	8
Offaly	3	10	1	14
Combined	3	16	3	22

== All-time results ==
=== Legend ===
Offaly win
Laois win
Match was a draw

=== Senior ===
No.	Date	Winners	Score	Runners-up	Venue	Stage
1.	21 July 1904	Laois	1-5 - 0-2	Offaly	Maryboro	Leinster Quarter-Final
2.	1 July 1917	Laois	2-7 - 0-0	Offaly	Tullamore	Leinster Quarter-Final
3.	28 June 1936	Laois	4-5 - 3-4	Offaly	Athy	Leinster Semi-Final
4.	16 May 1937	Laois	2-6 - 1-9	Offaly	St. Conleth's Park	Leinster Quarter-Final
5.	30 May 1937	Laois	2-7 - 1-7	Offaly	Athy	Leinster Quarter-Final Replay
6.	14 July 1940	Laois	2-7 - 0-7	Offaly	Athy	Leinster Semi-Final
7.	24 May 1942	Offaly	6-5 - 2-7	Laois	O'Moore Park	Leinster Quarter-Final
8.	2 June 1946	Laois	1-7 - 1-5	Offaly	O'Connor Park	Leinster Quarter-Final
9.	6 July 1947	Laois	5-11 - 0-4	Offaly	O'Moore Park	Leinster Semi-Final
10.	11 May 1958	Offaly	4-3 - 1-5	Laois	St. Conleth's Park	Leinster Preliminary Round
11.	17 May 1959	Offaly	1-9 - 2-6	Laois	O'Moore Park	Leinster Quarter-Final
12.	7 June 1959	Laois	3-8 - 0-10	Offaly	O'Connor Park	Leinster Quarter-Final Replay
13.	30 June 1963	Laois	2-7 - 0-9	Offaly	O'Moore Park	Leinster Semi-Final
14.	30 June 1968	Laois	0-11 - 0-6	Offaly	O'Connor Park	Leinster Semi-Final
15.	4 July 1971	Offaly	2-12 - 0-10	Laois	O'Moore Park	Leinster Semi-Final
16.	15 June 1975	Offaly	0-13 - 0-13	Laois	O'Connor Park	Leinster Quarter-Final
17.	29 June 1975	Offaly	3-14 - 3-7	Laois	O'Moore Park	Leinster Quarter-Final Replay
18.	25 June 1978	Offaly	0-16 - 2-8	Laois	O'Moore Park	Leinster Quarter-Final
19.	17 June 1979	Offaly	1-12 - 0-13	Laois	O'Connor Park	Leinster Quarter-Final
20.	26 July 1981	Offaly	1-18 - 3-9	Laois	Croke Park	Leinster Final
21.	27 June 1982	Offaly	3-13 - 1-15	Laois	O'Connor Park	Leinster Semi-Final
22.	10 June 1990	Laois	3-15 - 3-5	Offaly	O'Moore Park	Leinster Quarter-Final
23.	27 May 2001	Offaly	1-13 - 0-12	Laois	Croke Park	Leinster Quarter-Final
24.	26 May 2002	Offaly	0-13 - 2-6	Laois	O'Connor Park	Leinster Quarter-Final
25.	25 May 2003	Laois	1-12 - 1-12	Offaly	O'Moore Park	Leinster Quarter-Final
26.	2 June 2003	Laois	2-10 - 0-13	Offaly	O'Connor Park	Leinster Quarter-Final Replay
27.	29 May 2005	Laois	1-10 - 1-8	Offaly	Croke Park	Leinster Quarter-Final
28.	30 July 2006	Laois	1-9 - 0-4	Offaly	O'Moore Park	All Ireland Qualifier Round 4
29.	29 June 2019	Laois	0-20 - 0-15	Offaly	O'Moore Park	All Ireland Qualifier Round 3
30.	20 May 2023	Laois	1-12 - 1-12	Offaly	O'Moore Park	2023 Tailteann Cup
31.	11 April 2026	Laois	3-12-0-12	Offaly	O'Connor Park	Leinster Preliminary Round
