= 1992 All-Ireland Senior Ladies' Football Championship final =

1992 All-Ireland Senior Ladies' Football Final
- Event: 1992 All-Ireland Senior Ladies' Football Championship
Waterford	Laois
2–10	3–4
- Date: 1992
- Venue: Croke Park, Dublin

The 1992 All-Ireland Senior Ladies' Football Championship final was the nineteenth All-Ireland Final and the deciding match of the 1992 All-Ireland Senior Ladies' Football Championship, an inter-county ladies' Gaelic football tournament for the top teams in Ireland.

Laois thought they had not done themselves justice in the 1991 final, but Waterford beat them again.
