= Colm Kelly =

Irish Gaelic footballer

Personal information
- Native name: Colm Ó Ceallaigh (Irish)
- Born: County Laois

Sport
- Sport: Gaelic football
- Position: Left corner forward
Club
- Years: Club
- Stradbally
Club titles
- Laois titles: 1
Inter-county
- Years: County
- Laois

Colm Kelly is a Gaelic footballer from County Laois.

Kelly usually plays at left corner forward for Laois and in 2003 was part of the Laois team that won the All-Ireland Minor Football Championship title for the first time since 1997. In 2005 his club Stradbally won the Laois Senior Football Championship for the first time since 1998. In 2006, Kelly was part of the Laois team that won the Leinster U21 Football Championship.
