= Greg Ramsbottom =

Irish Gaelic footballer

Personal information
- Born: Ireland

Sport
- Sport: Gaelic football
- Position: Wing/centre forward
Club
- Years: Club
- Stradbally
Inter-county
- Years: County
- 1998-2003 2007 -: Laois

Greg Ramsbottom is a Gaelic football player from County Laois in Ireland.

He began his juvenile club career with Park/Ratheniska but he currently plays his club football for Stradbally and is also a member of the Laois senior team.

He was part of the Laois under-21 side that won the Leinster title and were eventual All-Ireland runners up in 1998 and was unfortunate to lose out on a Leinster Minor Football Championship medal in 1995 when it took three games to separate the O’Moore County and eventual All-Ireland Minor Football Championship winners Westmeath.

Greg made his Laois senior debut against Westmeath in 1998. He made his full championship start in 2000 against Westmeath.

With Stradbally, he won Laois Senior Football Championship medals in 1997 and 1998 before transferring to the Round Towers club in Dublin in 2005. He returned to play for Stradbally in 2007.
