= 1986 All-Ireland Senior Ladies' Football Championship final =

1986 All-Ireland Senior Ladies' Football Final
- Event: 1986 All-Ireland Senior Ladies' Football Championship
Kerry	Wexford
1–11	0–8
- Date: 12 October 1986
- Venue: Croke Park, Dublin

The 1986 All-Ireland Senior Ladies' Football Championship final was the thirteenth All-Ireland Final and the deciding match of the 1986 All-Ireland Senior Ladies' Football Championship, an inter-county ladies' Gaelic football tournament for the top teams in Ireland.

This was the first final played at Gaelic Athletic Association headquarters in Croke Park. Kerry won by six points.
