= 2000 All-Ireland Senior Ladies' Football Championship final =

2000 All-Ireland Senior Ladies' Football Final
- Event: 2000 All-Ireland Senior Ladies' Football Championship
Mayo	Waterford
3–6	0–14
- Date: 1 October 2000
- Venue: Croke Park, Dublin
- Referee: C Haughey (Carlow)

The 2000 All-Ireland Senior Ladies' Football Championship final was the 27th All-Ireland Final and the deciding match of the 2000 All-Ireland Senior Ladies' Football Championship, an inter-county ladies' Gaelic football tournament for the top teams in Ireland.

Mayo led by three points at the break and won by a point in the end, Cora Staunton leading the scoring with 2:2.
