= 1995 All-Ireland Senior Ladies' Football Championship final =

1995 All-Ireland Senior Ladies' Football Final
- Event: 1995 All-Ireland Senior Ladies' Football Championship
Waterford	Monaghan
4-14	1-5
- Date: 1995
- Venue: Croke Park, Dublin

The 1995 All-Ireland Senior Ladies' Football Championship final was the 22nd All-Ireland Final and the deciding match of the 1995 All-Ireland Senior Ladies' Football Championship, an inter-county ladies' Gaelic football tournament for the top teams in Ireland.

Waterford defeated Monaghan for the second year in a row.
