= Damien Delaney (Gaelic footballer) =

Irish Gaelic footballer

Personal information
- Native name: Damien Ó Dubhshláine (Irish)
- Nickname: Goggy or fathead
- Born: 6/9/1973 County Laois, Ireland
- Height: 6"

Sport
- Sport: Gaelic football
- Position: Full Forward
Club
- Years: Club
- ? -?: Stradbally
Inter-county
- Years: County
- ?- ?: Laois
Inter-county titles
- Leinster titles: 1

Damien Delaney is a former Gaelic footballer for Laois.

He won a Leinster Senior Football Championship medal with Laois in 2003 and he also helped Laois to a Leinster Under 21 Football title in 1994.

With his club, Stradbally, Delaney picked up three Laois Senior Football Championship medals in 1997, 1998 and 2005.

His father Sean was also a noted Laois sportsman. He has 5 children.
