= 1990 All-Ireland Senior Ladies' Football Championship final =

1990 All-Ireland Senior Ladies' Football Final
- Event: 1990 All-Ireland Senior Ladies' Football Championship
Kerry	Laois
1–9	0–6
- Date: 11 November 1990
- Venue: Croke Park, Dublin
- Attendance: 1,000
- Weather: Cold

The 1990 All-Ireland Senior Ladies' Football Championship final was the twelfth All-Ireland Final and the deciding match of the 1990 All-Ireland Senior Ladies' Football Championship, an inter-county ladies' Gaelic football tournament for the top teams in Ireland.

Margaret Lawlor scored a goal after 15 minutes and Kerry won easily to complete an unprecedented nine-in-a-row.
