= John Beagley (Australian cricketer) =

Australian cricketer (1933–2014)

Personal information
- Full name: John William Beagley
- Born: 23 March 1933; Adelaide, South Australia
- Died: 14 March 2014 (aged 80); Darwin, Northern Territory
- Batting: Right-handed
- Bowling: Right-arm fast-medium
- Role: Bowler

Domestic team information
- Years: Team
- 1956/57-1959/60: South Australia

Career statistics
Competition	First-class
Matches	18
Runs scored	129
Batting average	5.86
100s/50s	0/0
Top score	19
Balls bowled	4,052
Wickets	51
Bowling average	37.03
5 wickets in innings	1
10 wickets in match	0
Best bowling	6/121
Catches/stumpings	5/–
- Source: Cricinfo, 24 April 2018

John William Beagley (23 March 1933 – 14 March 2014) was an Australian cricketer. He played eighteen first-class matches for South Australia between the 1956–57 season and 1959–60. Beagley died in Darwin, Northern Territory on 14 March 2014, at the age of 80.
