= Tadhg Begley =

Irish chemist

Tadhg P. Begley is an Irish chemist and Distinguished Professor, Robert A. Welch Foundation Chair and Derek Barton Chair of Chemistry at Texas A&M University, and also a published author of books. His honors include Elected Fellow of the American Association for the Advancement of Science, National Institutes of Health Merit Award, National University of Chemistry Honorary D.Sc.
