= 1994 All-Ireland Senior Ladies' Football Championship final =

1994 All-Ireland Senior Ladies' Football Final
- Event: 1994 All-Ireland Senior Ladies' Football Championship
Waterford	Monaghan
2-10	0-12
- Date: 1994
- Venue: Croke Park, Dublin

The 1994 All-Ireland Senior Ladies' Football Championship final was the 21st All-Ireland Final and the deciding match of the 1994 All-Ireland Senior Ladies' Football Championship, an inter-county ladies' Gaelic football tournament for the top teams in Ireland.

Waterford defeated Monaghan.
