= Bill Delaney =

Gaelic football player and administrator

Personal information
- Native name: Liam Ó Dubhshláine (Irish)
- Born: 11 June 1915 Ireland
- Died: July 2000 (aged 85)

Sport
- Sport: Gaelic football
- Position: -
Club
- Years: Club
- ? -?: Stradbally
Inter-county
Years	County	Apps (scores)
1934 - 1951	Laois	41 (11-30)
Inter-county titles
- Leinster titles: 4

Bill Delaney (11 June 1915 – 2000) was a famous Gaelic footballer from Laois. His death at the age of 85 in July 2000 reminded of a decades-long career in the GAA as a player, referee and administrator.

== Career ==
From a famous footballing family he played Gaelic football at club, county and provincial level during the 1930s and 1940s and was regarded as one of the greatest footballers of all time.

Delaney played for Laois in the All-Ireland Minor Football Championship final of 1932 and when he made his senior debut at the age of 18 the following year he commenced an inter-county career that saw him play in 18 successive championships. He won four Leinster Senior Football Championship titles with Laois during a glorious period that saw them go so close to a taking the elusive All-Ireland Senior Football Championship title.

At the time of his retirement from the senior team, his 41 championship appearances was a Laois senior record - one that would stand for five decades after he finished. In addition, his 11 championship goals remain a (joint) Laois senior football championship record. Bill finished his senior career with a total of 97 appearances (41 SFC, 48 NFL and 8 other), which was another record and remained in place until March 1977, when John Conway passed him out.

Bill also won five Railway Cup medals and captained the side in 1929 when the team also included his three brothers Jack, Mick and Chris.

The Stradbally man also refereed two All-Ireland Senior Football Championship finals and was a member of the powerful Central Council for a period that spanned four decades.

In recognition of his skills and long-running contribution to the sport, Delaney was awarded the 1994 All-Time All Star Award as no All Stars Awards were being issued at the time of his playing career.
