= 1999 All-Ireland Senior Ladies' Football Championship final =

1999 All-Ireland Senior Ladies' Football Final
- Event: 1999 All-Ireland Senior Ladies' Football Championship
Mayo	Waterford
0–12	0–8
- Date: 3 October 1999
- Venue: Croke Park, Dublin
- Attendance: 15,000

The 1999 All-Ireland Senior Ladies' Football Championship final was the 26th All-Ireland Final and the deciding match of the 1999 All-Ireland Senior Ladies' Football Championship, an inter-county ladies' Gaelic football tournament for the top teams in Ireland.
