= Stradbally =

Town in County Laois, Ireland

Stradbally An Sráidbhaile (Irish)
- Town
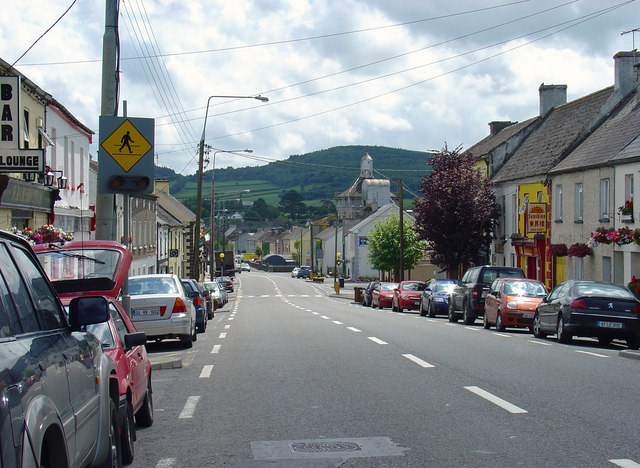
- Main Street

- Location in Ireland
- Coordinates: 53°01′01″N 7°09′11″W
- Country: Ireland
- Province: Leinster
- County: County Laois
- Elevation: 80 m (260 ft)

Population (2022)
  - Total: 1,404
- Time zone: UTC+0 (WET)
  - Summer (DST): UTC-1 (IST (WEST))
- Irish Grid Reference: S569964

Stradbally (Irish: An Sráidbhaile, meaning 'the (one) street town') is a town in County Laois, Ireland.

== Overview ==
It is located in the midlands of Ireland along the N80 road, about 12 km (7 mi) from Portlaoise and 70 km (43 mi) from Dublin. It is a townland, a civil parish, and historic barony.

It is known for its annual Steam Rally and the Electric Picnic music festival.

== History ==
The history of Stradbally dates to the 6th century. The area was called "Mon-au-Bealing" and Colman Mac ua Laoise, a disciple of St. Columba, established a monastery at Oughaval, close to the town and within the present-day parish.

In 1447 Franciscans came to Mon-au-Bealing and by 1550 a small village had developed. The name Stradbally (Sraidbhaile Laoise) was in use at least from the 16th century as it is referred to by that name in the Annals of the Four Masters.

Samuel Lewis's Topographical Dictionary of Ireland (published in 1837) records that the parish at that time contained "2392 inhabitants, of which number, 1799 are in the town".

== Birth of motor racing ==
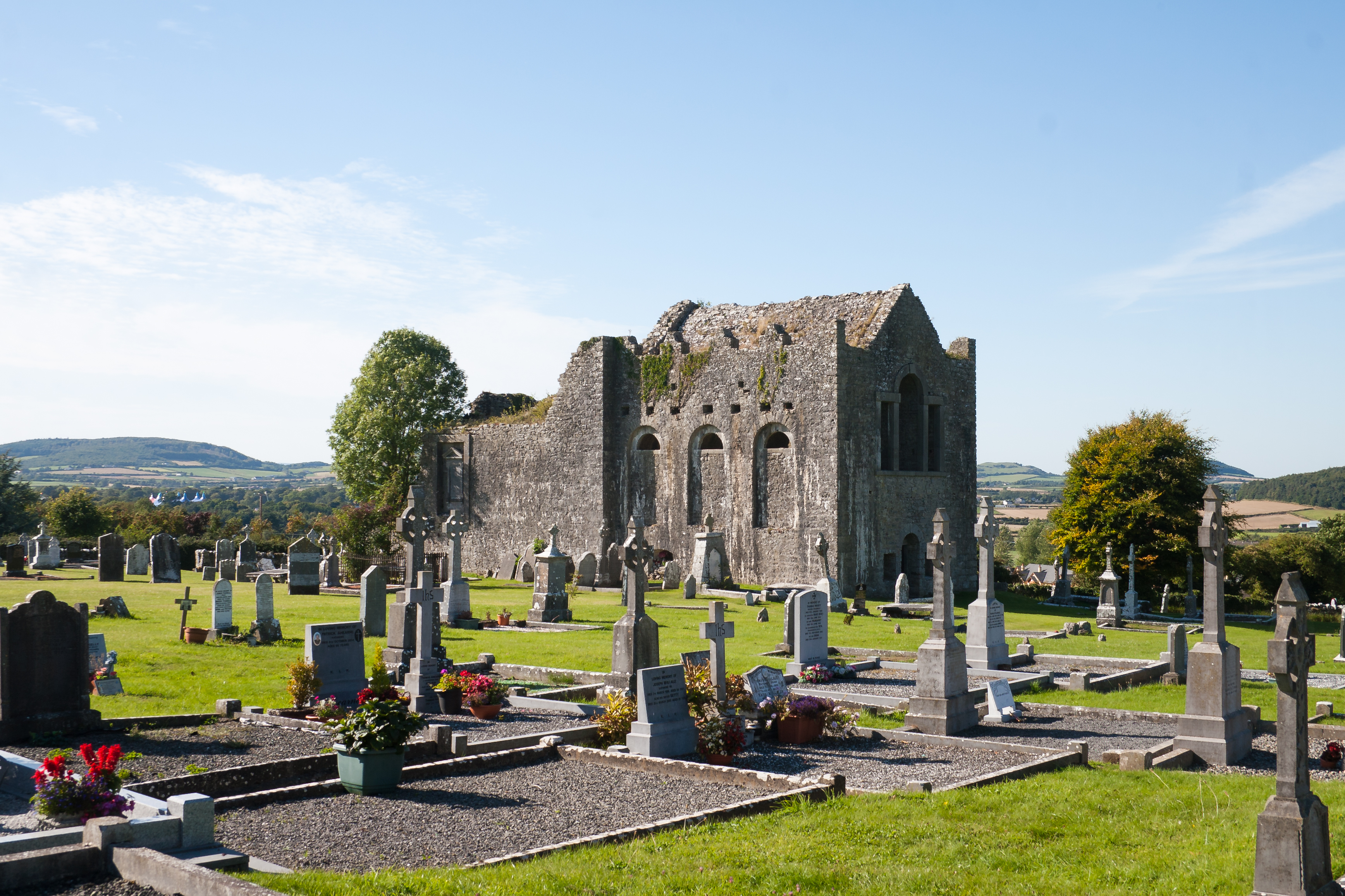
Oughaval Church in Carricksallagh

On 2 July 1903 the Gordon Bennett Cup ran through Stradbally. It was the first international motor race to be held in Ireland. Kildare was chosen at least partly on the grounds that the straightness of the roads would be a safety benefit. As a compliment to Ireland, the British team chose to race in Shamrock green^{[a]} which thus became known as British racing green.

The route consisted of several loops of a route which included Kilcullen, Kildare, Monasterevin, Stradbally, Athy, Castledermot, and Carlow. The 520 kilometres (323 mi) race was won by the Belgian racer Camille Jenatzy, driving a Mercedes.

== Demography ==
The population has risen steadily over the past few years;

- 2006: 1056
- 2011: 1154
- 2016: 1350
- 2022: 1404

In 2016, the population was 97% Irish or British, 2% European and 1% non-European.

Among the residents, 62% are able to speak Irish.

== Events ==
=== Steam rally ===
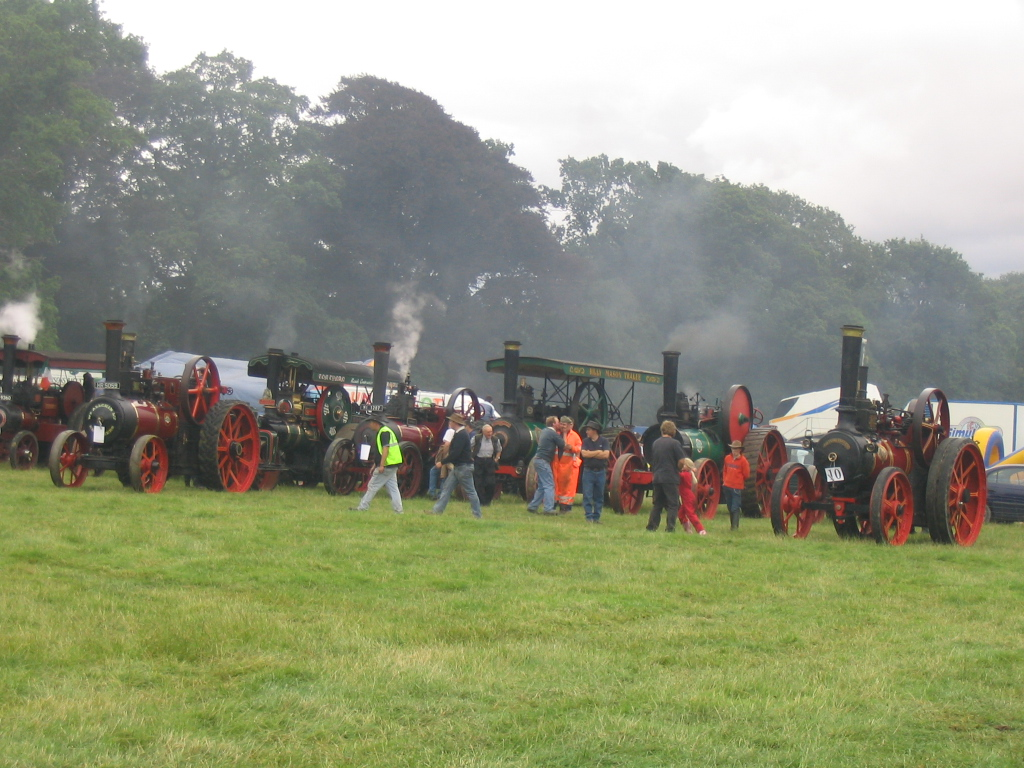
Stradbally steam rally

Stradbally is known for its Steam Rally, an annual gathering of enthusiasts of steam-powered vehicles, held in the grounds of the Cosby estate at Stradbally Hall every August bank holiday weekend. It is the oldest steam rally in Ireland and is supported by the Irish Steam Preservation Society.

Traction engines and other steam-powered vehicles are brought to the rally and displayed and demonstrated, and a steam railway offers rides along a short track.

Harold Condell and several others co-founded the Irish Steam Preservation Society. It also operates narrow gauge steam railway in the grounds of Stradbally Hall. There is also a Steam Museum in Stradbally Town.

Stradbally is steeped in steam history since the post industrial revolution. Steam traction engines were in abundance in Stradbally after the turn of the last century. Families who had threshing sets and steam engines included the Fennelly family of Market Square, Farrelly family, Cole's of Riverside, Condell's of Old Mills (Whitefields), and one family which is still keeping the tradition going are the Deegan's of Kylebeg and now Brockley whom to this day perform the annual threshing at the Steam Rally.

=== Stradbally Woodland Railway ===
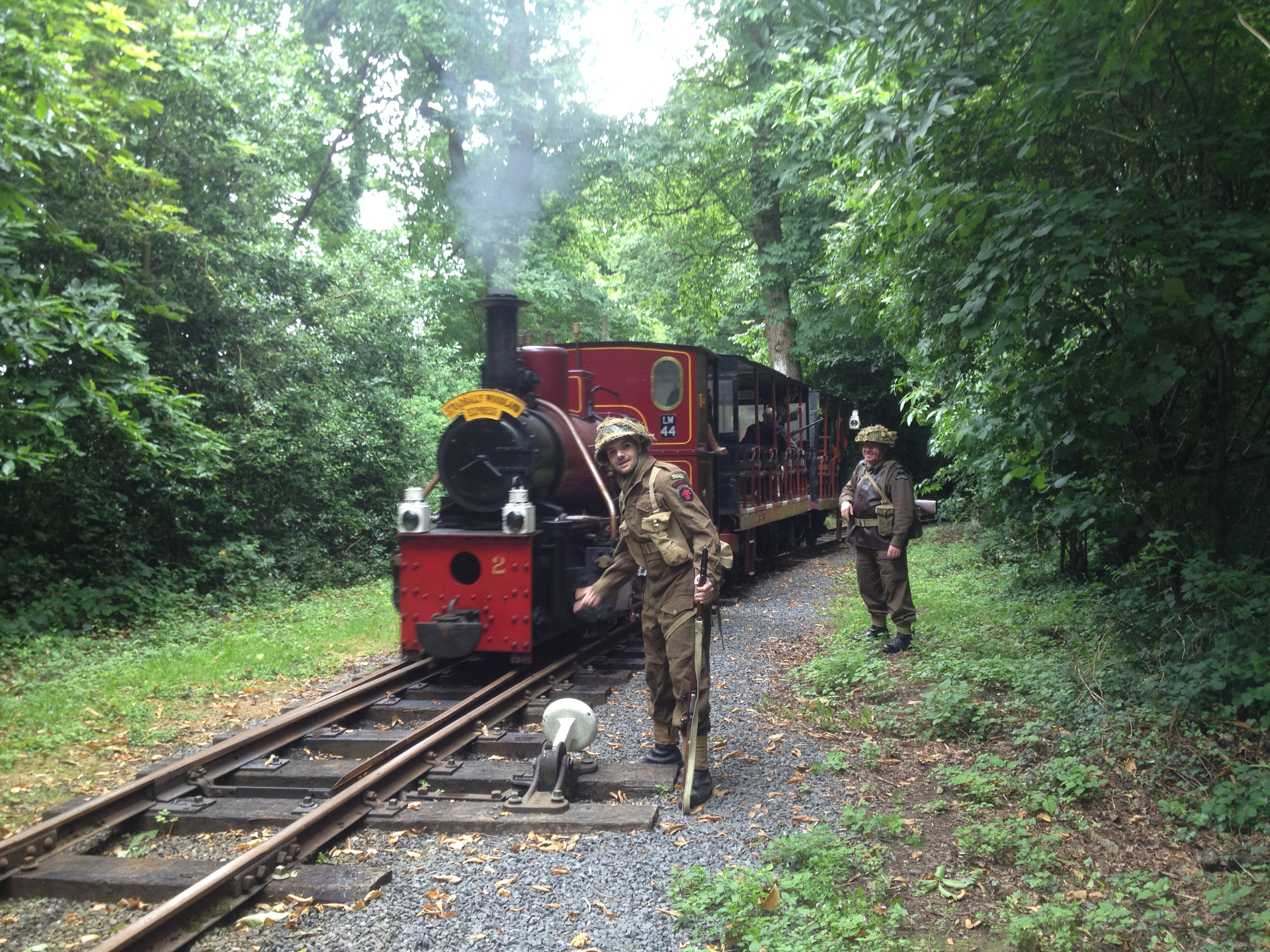
Photograph of the ex-BnM loco LM44/No. 2 at a "War on the Railway" event in July 2016.

Close to the area where the annual rally is held is a Steam railway which is operated by volunteers of the Irish Steam Preservation Society. It began with the acquisition, in 1966, of one of the Guinness company's steam engines, No 15 built in 1895 along with a few coaches. In 1969 it was replaced by a then surplus steam locomotive, part of BNM's failed experiment in Steam Traction, No2/LM44, built in 1949. The line was changed to 3 ft (914 mm) narrow gauge and has been steadily expanded to a balloon loop since. It has since acquired several diesel locomotives. ESB Ruston, Serial 326052, No 4, affectionately known as "Rusty" is the railway's Permanent Way locomotive and supplants No 2 from time to time and Planet, works no. 2014 "Nippy", the oldest operational Diesel locomotive in Ireland. The railway also showcases a 1949-built Andrew Barclay 0-4-0WT No 2/LM44, nicknamed "Róisín".

The railway runs every bank holiday weekend throughout the year.

=== Electric Picnic ===
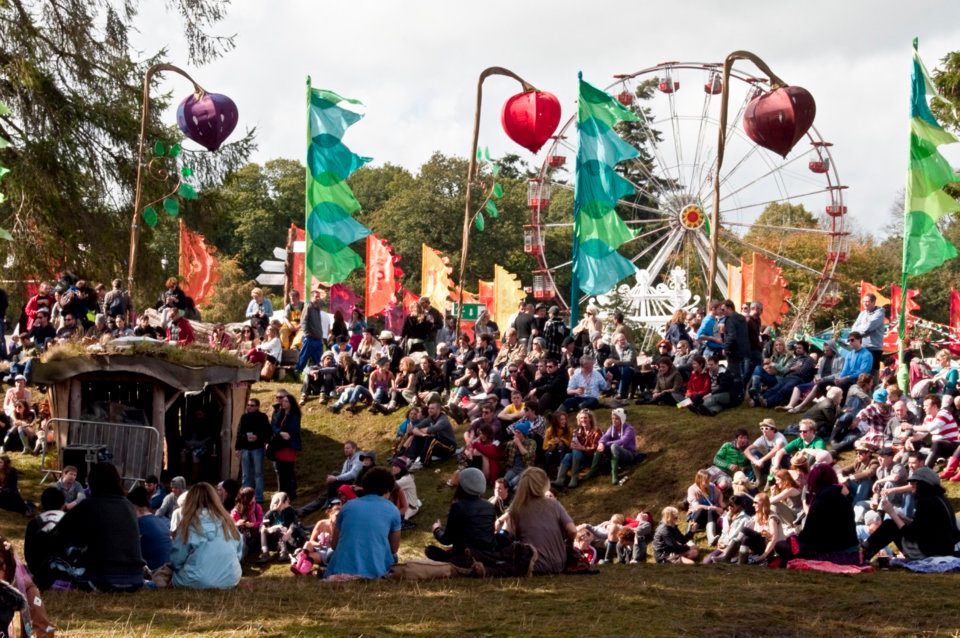
Electric Picnic 2010

The Electric Picnic is an annual arts-and-music festival which has been staged in late August / early September since 2004 at Stradbally Hall in Stradbally. It is organised by Pod Concerts and Festival Republic. The Electric Picnic won eight awards in Hot Press's 2011 Festival Awards, including 'Best Large Festival'. In 2023, it was awarded 'Festival of the Year' in the Ticketmaster Awards.

== Religion ==
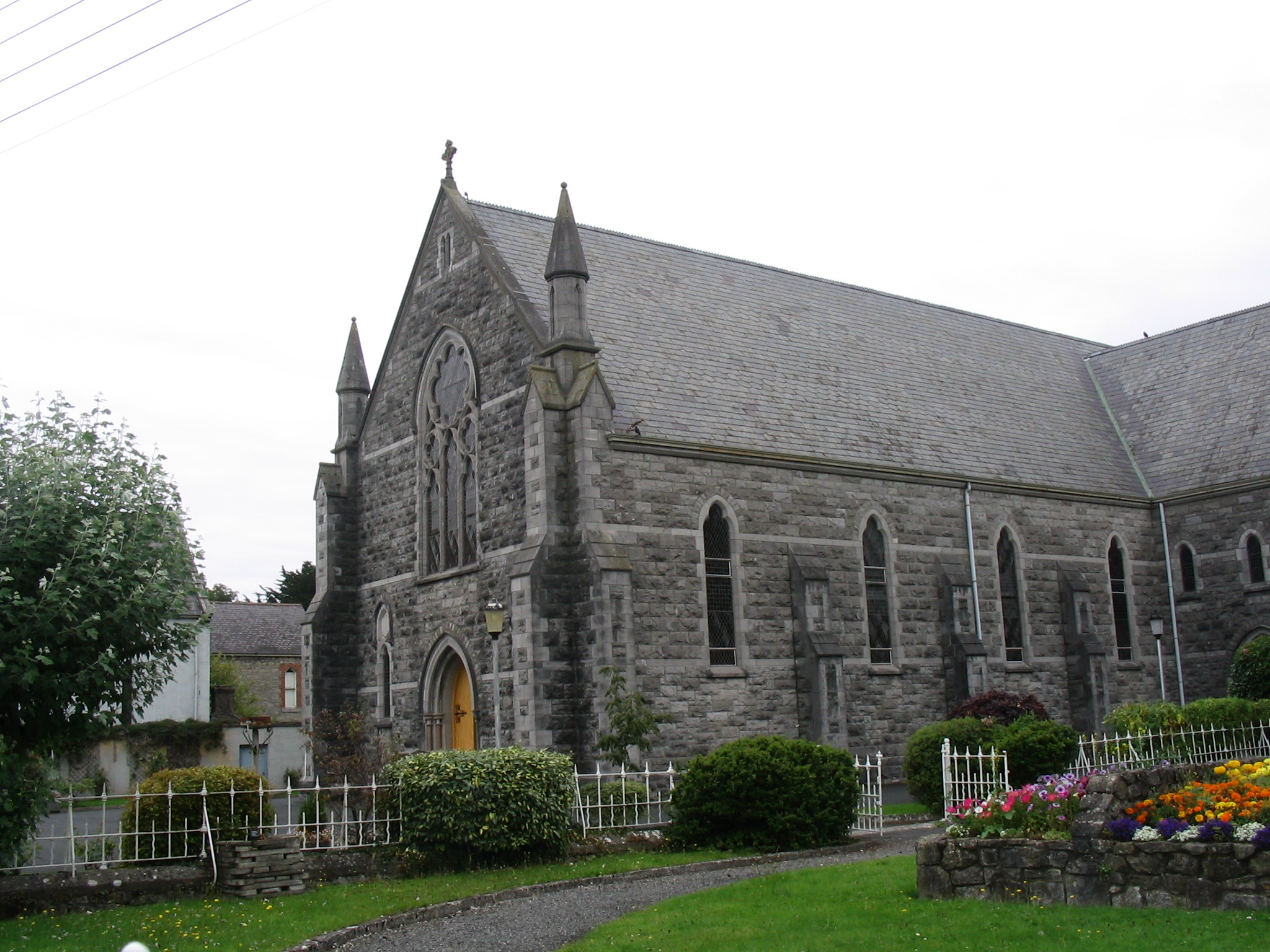
St. Patrick's church in Stradbally

The Catholic Church of the Sacred Heart is a Gothic Revival church which was completed in 1896 to a cruciform plan. It was designed by William Hague.

Saint Patrick's Church of Ireland Church, also a Gothic Revival church, built in 1764, with one tower. During renovations around 1880 a projecting porch, chancel and vestry were added.

Saint Colman's Orthodox Church, of the Russian Orthodox Church Outside of Russia, is located on the Abbeyleix Road, approximately one mile outside Stradbally.

== Sport ==
Local sports clubs include Stradbally GAA club (the local GAA club), and Stradbally Town A.F.C. (an association football (soccer) club).

== Notable people ==
- Colm Begley, Australian rules and Gaelic football player
- Cecil Day-Lewis late Poet Laureate of the United Kingdom and father of actor Daniel Day-Lewis
- Delaney Brothers, after whom the Leinster Senior Football Trophy is named
- Kevin O'Higgins, Irish politician, was from Stradbally
- Walter Shanly, Canadian politician, came from Stradbally.

== See also ==
- Oughaval
- List of steam fairs
- List of towns and villages in Ireland

== Notes ==
a. According to Leinster Leader, Saturday, 11 April 1903 Deprecated link archived 6 January 2017 at archive.today, Britain had to choose a different colour to its usual national colours of red, white and blue, as these had already been taken by Italy, Germany and France respectively. It also stated red as the color for American cars in the 1903 Gordon Bennett Cup.
