= 1991 All-Ireland Senior Ladies' Football Championship final =

1991 All-Ireland Senior Ladies' Football Final
- Event: 1991 All-Ireland Senior Ladies' Football Championship
Waterford	Laois
5–8	3–7
- Date: 13 October 1991
- Venue: Croke Park, Dublin

The 1991 All-Ireland Senior Ladies' Football Championship final was the eighteenth All-Ireland Final and the deciding match of the 1991 All-Ireland Senior Ladies' Football Championship, an inter-county ladies' Gaelic football tournament for the top teams in Ireland.

Waterford had beaten Kerry in the Munster final to prevent a ten-in-a-row, and went on to beat Laois by seven points.
