= Begleiter =

Begleiter is a Jewish surname from the German word for "companion". Notable people with the surname include:

- Steven Begleiter, poker player
- Ralph Begleiter (born 1949), American journalist and educator
- Henri Begleiter (1935–2006), American neurophysiologist
- Lionel Begleiter, birth name of Lionel Bart (1930–1999), British composer of musicals
- Ludwik Begleiter, birth name of Louis Begley (born 1933), American lawyer and novelist
