= Michael Begley =

Michael Begley may refer to:

- Michael Begley (politician) (1932–2012), Irish Fine Gael politician
- Michael Begley (rower) (1872–1938), American rower who won a medal at the 1904 Summer Olympics
- Michael Joseph Begley (1909–2002), bishop of the Roman Catholic Diocese of Charlotte, North Carolina, 1972–1984
- Michael Begley (actor), British actor and writer
