= 2017 All-Ireland Senior Ladies' Football Championship =

All-Ireland Senior Ladies' Football Championship 2017
Championship details
- Dates: 13 May – 24 September 2017
- Teams: Connacht 2 Leinster 4 Munster 3 Ulster 4

All-Ireland champions
- Winners: Dublin (2nd win)
- Captain: Sinéad Aherne
- Manager: Mick Bohan

All Ireland Runners-up
- Runners-up: Mayo
- Captain: Sarah Tierney
- Manager: Frank Browne

Provincial champions
- Connacht: Galway
- Leinster: Dublin
- Munster: Kerry
- Ulster: Donegal

Championship Statistics

The 2017 All-Ireland Senior Ladies' Football Championship was the 44th edition of the Ladies' Gaelic Football Association's premier inter-county Ladies' Gaelic Football tournament. It is known for sponsorship reasons as the TG4 All-Ireland Senior Ladies' Football Championship.

As well as live games on TG4, this season was the first to see live-streaming of championship games via YouTube.

== Format ==
Provincial Championships

Connacht, Leinster, Munster and Ulster each organise their provincial championship. Each province determines the format for deciding their champions and it may be league, group, knock-out, double-elimination, etc. or a combination. For clarity, the format is explained in the provincial sections below.

Qualifiers

All teams except the provincial champions enter the All-Ireland qualifiers. The final four winners from the qualifiers re-enter the All-Ireland championship at the quarter-final stage. All matches are knock-out.

All-Ireland

The four provincial champions play the four winners from the qualifiers in the All-Ireland quarter-finals with the winners progressing to the semi-finals. The final is normally played on the fourth Sunday in September. All matches are knock-out.

Hawkeye

This was the first year that Hawkeye was used in Ladies Gaelic Football but was limited to televised matches.

== Provincial championships ==
=== Connacht Championship ===
==== Connacht Format ====
As only two teams enter, a knock-out final is played.

==== Connacht Final ====
2 July 2017; 4:30 pm Final	Mayo	1-8 – 3-12	Galway	MacHale Park, Castlebar; Referee: G Chapman (Sligo)
2 July 2017; 4:30 pm Final		Report		MacHale Park, Castlebar; Referee: G Chapman (Sligo)

=== Leinster Championship ===
==== Leinster Format ====
Three of the four Leinster teams (Kildare, Laois and Westmeath) compete in an initial group stage. Each team plays all the other teams once in three rounds.

The group winner advances to the final. The group runner-up plays Dublin in the semi-final.

==== Leinster Group Stage ====
Team	Pld	W	D	L	Pts	Diff
Westmeath	2	2	0	0	4	+8
Laois	2	1	0	1	2	+2
Kildare	2	0	0	2	0	–10

==== Leinster Semi-Final ====
25 June 2017; 12:00 pm Semi-Final	Laois	2-3 - 8-13	Dublin	Páirc Mochua, Timahoe
25 June 2017; 12:00 pm Semi-Final	Aileen O'Loughlin and Ciara Burke 1-0 each, Mo Nerney, Rachel Williams, Clare Conlon (0-1f) 0-1 each	Report	Sinéad Aherne 3-4 (1-0 pen, 0-1f), Sarah McCaffrey 2-2, Nicole Owens 2-1, 1-4, Amy Connolly and Lyndsey Davey 0-1 each	Páirc Mochua, Timahoe

==== Leinster Final ====
9 July 2017; 4:00 pm Final	Dublin	3-18 - 0-8	Westmeath	Dr. Cullen Park, Carlow; Man of the Match: Noëlle Healy
9 July 2017; 4:00 pm Final	Noëlle Healy 2-3, Lauren Magee 1-1, Sinéad Aherne 0-4 (0-2f), Carla Rowe 0-3, Nicole Owens and Denise McKenna (0-1f) 0-2 each Rachel Ruddy, Niamh Collins, Niamh McEvoy 0-1 each	Report	Fiona Claffey, Laura Lee Walsh 0-2, Leona Archibald (0-1f) 0-2 each, Maud Annie Foley and Lucy McCartan 0-1 each	Dr. Cullen Park, Carlow; Man of the Match: Noëlle Healy

=== Munster Championship ===
==== Munster Format ====
The three Munster teams (Cork, Kerry and Waterford) compete in an initial group stage. The top two teams advance to the final.

==== Munster Group Stage ====
Team	Pld	W	D	L	Pts	Diff
Waterford	2	2	0	0	4	+9
Kerry	2	1	0	1	2	–1
Cork	2	0	0	2	0	–8

==== Munster Final ====
8 July 2017; 3:15 pm Final	Waterford	3-6 – 1-14	Kerry	Carrigoon GAA Complex, Mallow; Man of the Match: Aislinn Desmond
8 July 2017; 3:15 pm Final	Maria Delahunty 1-3 (0-3f), Katie Hannon (1-0 pen) and Grainne Kennealy 1-0 each, Michelle Ryan 0-2, Aoife Murray 0-1	Report	Sarah Houlihan 1-4 (0-1f), Louise Ni Mhuircheartaigh 0-6 (0-2f), Lorraine Scanlon 0-2, Amanda Brosnan and Laura Rogers 0-1 each	Carrigoon GAA Complex, Mallow; Man of the Match: Aislinn Desmond

=== Ulster Championship ===
==== Ulster Format ====
Four teams compete in two semi-finals and a final. All matches are knockout.

==== Ulster Semi-Finals ====
10 June 2017
7 p.m.
Semi-Final

Armagh	1-10 - 1-14	Donegal

Páirc Naomh Colmcille, Carrickmore

17 June 2017
7 p.m.
Semi-Final

Cavan	2-10 – 1-19	Monaghan

Pearse Park, Galbally, County Tyrone

==== Ulster Final ====
2 July 2017; 3:45 PM; Final	Donegal	4-11 - 0-15	Monaghan	St. Tiernach's Park, Clones; Referee: Conor Dourneen (Cavan); Man of the Match: Geraldine McLaughlin
2 July 2017; 3:45 PM; Final	Geraldine McLaughlin 2-6 (0-4f), Yvonne McMonagle 1-1, Roisin Friel 1-0, Karen Guthrie 0-2f, Grainne Houston and Eilish Ward 0-1 each	Report	Ellen McCarron 0-8 (0-4f), Eileen McKenna and Ciara McAnespie 0-2, Cora Courtney (0-1f), Caoimhe Mohan, Rosemary Courtney 0-1 each	St. Tiernach's Park, Clones; Referee: Conor Dourneen (Cavan); Man of the Match: Geraldine McLaughlin

== Qualifiers ==
=== Qualifiers Format ===
All the teams except the provincial champions enter the qualifiers. All matches are knock-out.

A preliminary round is held to reduce the number of teams to eight who then play four matches. The four winners play the four provincial champions in the All-Ireland quarter-finals.

=== Qualifiers Preliminary Round ===
22 July 2017
12 noon
Preliminary round

Laois	1-10 – 2-17	Cavan

Donaghmore Ashbourne GAA, Ashbourne
Referee: Gavin Corrigan

=== Qualifiers Last Eight ===
29 July 2017
2 p.m.
Qualifier

Waterford	1-15 – 1-13	Cavan
	Report

Conneff Park, Clane
Referee: Jonathan Murphy

29 July 2017
2:00 pm
Qualifier

Westmeath	4-11 – 3-16	Armagh
	Report

Páirc Uí Mhuirí, Dunleer

5 August 2017; Qualifier	Mayo	3-20 – 0-8	Kildare	Dunlo GAA Grounds, Ballinasloe; Referee: S Joy (Kerry); Man of the Match: Sarah Rowe (Kilmoremoy)
5 August 2017; Qualifier	Cora Staunton 1-11 (0-8f), Sarah Rowe 1-4, Grace Kelly 1-3, Aileen Gilroy and Orla Conlon 0-1 each	Report	Roisin Byrne 0-4 (0-2f), Molly Price 0-2, Louise Scully and Neasa Dooley 0-1 each	Dunlo GAA Grounds, Ballinasloe; Referee: S Joy (Kerry); Man of the Match: Sarah Rowe (Kilmoremoy)

7 August 2017; 3 p.m. Qualifier	Monaghan	1-10 - 0-14	Cork	O'Connor Park, Tullamore; Referee: Gerry Carmody; Man of the Match: Eimear Scally (Éire Óg)
7 August 2017; 3 p.m. Qualifier	Ciara McAnespie 1-2, Ellen McCarron 0-4 (0-2f), Cora Courtney (0-1f), Laura McEnaney, Caoimhe Mohan, Rosemary Courtney 0-1 each	Report	Eimear Scally (0-1f) and Orla Finn (0-3f) 0-5 each, Niamh Cotter, Cara O’Sullivan, Doireann O’Sullivan, Áine O’Sullivan 0-1 each	O'Connor Park, Tullamore; Referee: Gerry Carmody; Man of the Match: Eimear Scally (Éire Óg)

== All-Ireland ==
=== All-Ireland Quarter-Finals ===
The four provincial champions play the four remaining teams from the qualifiers.

12 August 2017; 4:45 pm Quarter-final	Dublin	2-15 - 1-7	Waterford	Nowlan Park, Kilkenny; Referee: Seamus Mulvihil (Kerry); Man of the Match: Nicole Owens (St. Sylvesters)
12 August 2017; 4:45 pm Quarter-final	Sinéad Aherne 1-9 (0-6f), Nicole Owens 1-4, Noëlle Healy 0-2	Report	Roisin Tobin 1-0, Maria Delahunty 0-3f, Aoife Murray, Katie Murray, Eimear Fennell, Michelle Ryan 0-1 each	Nowlan Park, Kilkenny; Referee: Seamus Mulvihil (Kerry); Man of the Match: Nicole Owens (St. Sylvesters)

12 August 2017; 6:30 pm Quarter-final	Kerry	3-14 - 2-11	Armagh	Nowlan Park, Kilkenny; Referee: Jonathan Murphy (Carlow); Man of the Match: Hannah O'Donoghue (Beaufort)
12 August 2017; 6:30 pm Quarter-final	Hannah O’Donoghue 1-4, Loiuse Ní Mhuircheartaigh 1-3 (0-1f), Sara Houlihan 0-4 (0-2f), Anna Galvin 1-0, Lorraine Scanlon 0-2, Eilish O’Leary 0-1	Report	Aimee Mackin 2-4, Aoife McCoy and Fionulla McKenna (0-2f) 0-3 each, Lauren McConville 0-1	Nowlan Park, Kilkenny; Referee: Jonathan Murphy (Carlow); Man of the Match: Hannah O'Donoghue (Beaufort)

19 August 2017; 12:30 pm Quarter-final	Galway	1-10 - 6-19	Cork	Cusack Park, Mullingar; Referee: Niall McCormack (Laois); Man of the Match: Orla Finn (Kinsale)
19 August 2017; 12:30 pm Quarter-final	Deirdre Brennan 1-0, Mairéad Seoighe (0-1f) and Tracey Leonard (0-2f) 0-3 each, Shauna Hynes, Catriona Cormican, Olivia Divilly, Megan Glynn 0-1 each	Report	Orla Finn 0-10 (0-4f), Brid O'Sullivan 2-1, Eimear Scally 1-3, Áine O’Sullivan and Doireann O’Sullivan (0-1f) 1-2 each, Niamh Cotter 1-0, Ciara O'Sullivan 0-1	Cusack Park, Mullingar; Referee: Niall McCormack (Laois); Man of the Match: Orla Finn (Kinsale)

19 August 2017; 2:15 pm Quarter-final	Donegal	2-11 - 3-14	Mayo	Cusack Park, Mullingar; Referee: Gus Chapman (Sligo); Man of the Match: Grace Kelly (Moy Davitts)
19 August 2017; 2:15 pm Quarter-final	Yvonne McMonagle 1-3, Geraldine McLaughlin 1-1 (0-1f), Karen Guthrie 0-3 (0-2f), Niamh Hegarty 0-2, Aoife McDonnell and Katy Herron 0-1 each	Report	Cora Staunton 1-6 (0-3f), Grace Kelly 1-4, Niamh Kelly 1-0, Sarah Rowe 0-3, Aileen Gilroy 0-1	Cusack Park, Mullingar; Referee: Gus Chapman (Sligo); Man of the Match: Grace Kelly (Moy Davitts)

=== All-Ireland Semi-Finals ===
26 August 2017; 6:30 pm Semi-final	Dublin	5-10 - 0-11	Kerry	Semple Stadium, Thurles; Referee: S McNulty (Sligo); Man of the Match: Sinéad Aherne (St. Sylvesters)
26 August 2017; 6:30 pm Semi-final	Sinéad Aherne 2-7 (1-0 pen, 0-4f), Noëlle Healy 2-0, Nicole Owens 1-1, Sinéad Goldrick and Carla Rowe 0-1 each	Report	Louise Ni Mhuircheartaigh 0-8 (0-4f), Hannah O'Donoghue, Laura Rogers, Fiadhna Tangney 0-1 each	Semple Stadium, Thurles; Referee: S McNulty (Sligo); Man of the Match: Sinéad Aherne (St. Sylvesters)

2 September 2017; 4:45 pm Semi-final	Mayo	3-11 – 0-18	Cork	Breffni Park, Cavan; Referee: Niall McCormack (Laois); Man of the Match: Cora Staunton (Carnacon)
2 September 2017; 4:45 pm Semi-final	Cora Staunton 1-9 (0-2f), Aileen Gilroy and Amy Dowling 1-0, Niamh Kelly and Ciara Whyte 0-1 each	Report	Orla Finn 0-13 (0-11f), Áine O'Sulliavan 0-2, Roisin Phelan, Ciara O'Sullivan, Brid O'Sullivan 0-1 each	Breffni Park, Cavan; Referee: Niall McCormack (Laois); Man of the Match: Cora Staunton (Carnacon)

=== All-Ireland final ===
24 September 2017

Dublin	4-11; 0-11	Mayo
Sinéad Aherne (0-9); Sarah McCaffrey (2-0); Carla Rowe (1-1); Niamh McEvoy (1-1)		Cora Staunton (0-7); Grace Kelly (0-2); Aileen Gilroy (0-1); Niamh Kelly (0-1)

Croke Park, Dublin
Attendance: 46,286
Referee: Seamus Mulvihill (Kerry)
