= Tony Maher (Gaelic footballer) =

Irish Gaelic footballer

Personal information
- Native name: Antóin Ó Meacheair (Irish)
- Nickname: Barney
- Born: 25 January 1969 (age 57) Ireland

Sport
- Sport: Gaelic football
- Position: Midfield
Club
- Years: Club
- ? -?: Stradbally
Inter-county
- Years: County
- ?- ?: Laois

Tony Maher (born 25 January 1969) is a former Gaelic footballer from County Laois.

He played for Laois senior football team, primarily in midfield, throughout the 1990s and into the early 2000s.

In 1991, he played on the Laois team beaten by Meath in the final of the Leinster Senior Football Championship.

He was appointed as manager of the Timahoe senior football team in late 2007 and guided them to the 2008 Laois Senior Football Championship final. He then managed them to win the 2010 intermediate title.

In 2013 he was named as the Laois under 21 football team manager and in late 2017 he was appointed as manager of his native club Stradbally for the 2018 season.
