= Stradbally GAA (Laois) =

Gaelic football club in Stradbally, County Laois, Ireland

- Sráid Bhaile
- Founded: 1889
- County: Laois
- Nickname: Strad, The Little Town
- Colours: Green and white
- Grounds: Bill Delaney Park
- Coordinates: 53°00′31.71″N 7°08′44.15″W

Playing kits
Standard colours

Senior Club Championships
	All Ireland	Leinster champions	Laois champions
Football:	-	-	18

Stradbally GAA is a Gaelic football club in Stradbally, County Laois, Ireland.

The club was founded in 1889 and its colours are green and white. The club grounds are called Bill Delaney Park after one of the club's most famous sons.

Stradbally GAA Club has won 17 Laois Senior Football Championship titles and numerous other titles at junior, intermediate and underage grades.

After 18 years in existence the championship of 1905 was won when the team defeated Raheenabrogue by 1–4 to 0–3 at Portlaoise on 21 January 1906. 2016 Stradbally bet Portlaoise in the county championship final and stopped their 10 in a row with a last minute goal.

Sean Delaney, Karl Lenihan, Tony Maher, Colm Kelly, Damien Delaney, Colm Begley, Greg Ramsbottom, Paul Begley and Gary Kavanagh are among Stradbally's most famous players in recent times.

== Achievements ==
- Laois Senior Football Championship Winners 1905, 1908, 1911, 1928, 1929, 1930, 1932, 1933, 1934, 1936, 1937, 1940, 1941, 1997, 1998, 2005, 2016
- Laois Intermediate Football Championship (1) 1959
- Laois All-County Football League Div. 1: 1999
- Laois All-County Football League Div. 2: (3) 1982, 1983, 2008
- Laois All-County Football League Div. 3: (1) 2000
- Laois All-County Football League Div. 4: (1) 1999
- Laois All-County Football League Div. 5: (1) 2024

== Notable players ==
- Sean Delaney
- Karl Lenihan
- Tony Maher
- Colm Kelly
- Greg Ramsbottom
- Colm Begley
- Paul Begley
- Gary Kavanagh
- Jody Dillon
- Eoin Buggie
- Tom Shiel, who came off the bench against Clare to kick a point in an All-Ireland Qualifier win when he was 17 years, one of Laois's youngest SFC debutants.
- Gary Comerford

Larry Keenan
