= 2001 All-Ireland Senior Ladies' Football Championship final =

2001 All-Ireland Senior Ladies' Football Final
- Event: 2001 All-Ireland Senior Ladies' Football Championship
Laois	Mayo
2–14	1–16
- Date: 30 September 2001
- Venue: Croke Park, Dublin
- Attendance: 21,000

The 2001 All-Ireland Senior Ladies' Football Championship final was the 28th All-Ireland Final and the deciding match of the 2001 All-Ireland Senior Ladies' Football Championship, an inter-county ladies' Gaelic football tournament for the top teams in Ireland.

The game was tied with seconds left when Mayo were penalised for not hitting a kickout far enough, and Laois pointed the free to win their first title, having lost seven finals prior to this.
