= Colm Begley =

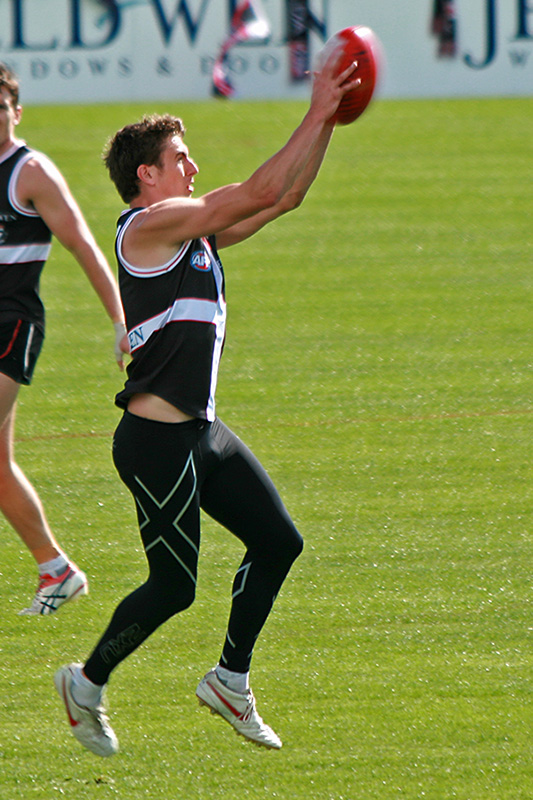

Personal information
- Full name: Colm Ó Beaglaoich
- Born: 31 August 1986 (age 40); Portlaoise, Ireland
- Original team: Stradbally (club)/Laois (county team)
- Draft: International rookie Brisbane Lions; 83rd overall, 2008; St Kilda
- Debut: Round 20, 2006, Brisbane Lions vs. West Coast, at The Gabba
- Height: 188 cm (74 in)
- Weight: 83 kg (183 lb)

Playing career^{1}
Years	Club	Games (Goals)
2006–2008	Brisbane Lions	29 (7)
2009	St Kilda	1 (0)
Total		30 (7)
- ^{1} Playing statistics correct to the end of 2009.

Career highlights
- International Rules Series U19's – 2005, 2006; Brisbane Lions, Rookie of the Year 2007; Ireland international rules football team representative - 2008

Colm Begley
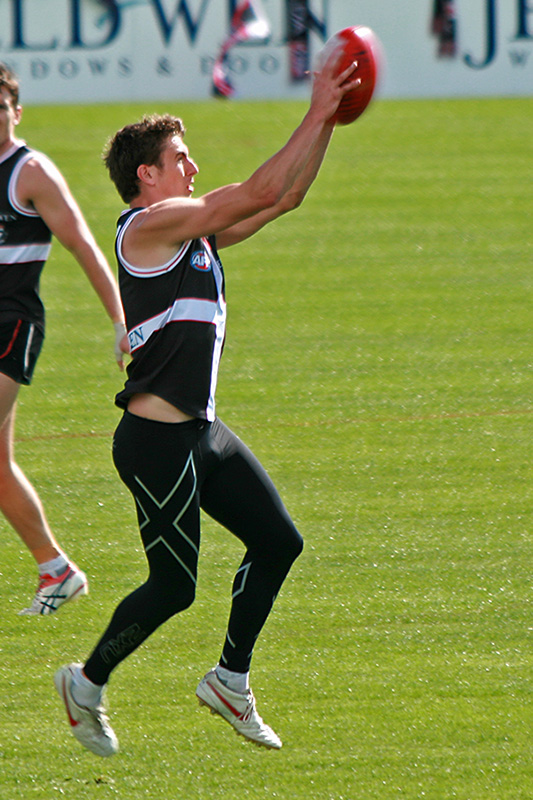

Personal information
- Nickname: Begz
- Born: 31 August 1986 (age 40) Portlaoise, Ireland
- Height: 188 cm (74 in)

Sport
- Sport: Gaelic Football
- Position: Wing Back
Clubs
- Years: Club
- –2006 2010–2015 2016–: Stradbally; Parnells; Stradbally
Club titles
- Laois titles: 2
College
- Years: College
- DCU
College titles
- Sigerson titles: 1
Inter-county
- Years: County
- 2005–2006 2010–2020: Laois; Laois

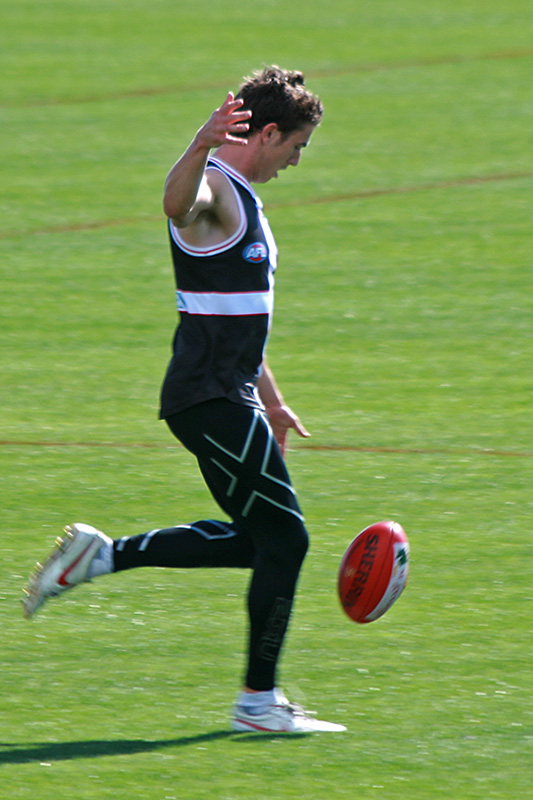
Begley at training prior to the 2009 AFL Grand Final

Colm Begley (born 31 August 1986) is an Irish Gaelic footballer from County Laois. He has also played Australian rules football for the St Kilda Football Club and the Brisbane Lions of the Australian Football League (AFL).

== Early life ==
Begley was born in Portlaoise and raised in nearby Stradbally. He began playing gaelic football at a young age at Stradbally GAA and by 19 had debuted in the senior Laios county team, winning the 2005 Senior Football County Final.

Begley was scouted by the Lions football manager Graeme Allan, along with several other potential recruits during a training camp in Ireland, having previously witnessed a near best on ground performance from the young Irishman in the Under 19s International Rules series playing for Ireland against Australia. Begley was later persuaded to move to Australia as a rookie listed professional Australian rules footballer in 2005. Begley moved to Australia with Brendan Quigley.

== AFL career ==
=== Brisbane Lions ===
Begley played his very first game of Australian rules immediately after moving from Ireland to Australia in 2006. In just his third game weeks later, he lined up in a NAB Cup quarter final. In that game he picked up a total of six possessions and one mark whilst playing on Melbourne speedster Aaron Davey.

He was later elevated to the senior list during the regular season when the Lions suffered a string of injuries. In his senior debut against the West Coast Eagles he gathered seven possessions, seven marks and two hitouts, lining up on Brownlow Medallist Chris Judd. At the end of the season he was retained by the club as a rookie listed player.

Following his good form through the 2007 NAB Cup, Begley was once again elevated onto the Brisbane Lions' senior playing list and was soon after named on the interchange bench in the Lions' first game for the season. He was soon playing regularly for the Lions. Begley was named the club's Rookie of the Year in 2007. His rise after such a short time playing the sport was described as 'remarkable'. However, Brisbane opted not to offer him a new contract for the 2009 season following an injury ravaged 2008 which restricted him to only eight appearances.

Begley represented Ireland in the senior 2008 International Rules Series with rumours of his delisting circulating; many commentators claimed that he was playing for his career. During this time he said that if his AFL career was over he would return to play Gaelic football with Laois. He appeared in both matches in the series, which Ireland won.

=== St Kilda ===
In the hope that he would be redrafted, Begley trained with Collingwood prior to the 2008 AFL Draft. He was eventually selected by St Kilda at pick 83.

Begley played in only one of the 22 matches of the 2009 AFL season home and away rounds in which St Kilda qualified in first position for the finals, winning the club’s third minor premiership.

After the 2009 AFL season, Begley retired from the AFL, announcing his desire to return to Ireland.

== Return to Ireland and senior Gaelic football ==
Begley returned to Ireland and attended DCU as an Undergraduate, where he would win the Sigerson Cup with the College in 2015 and be awarded a Colleges Rising Star

He is currently playing for his home club, Stradbally, having initially lining out with Dublin side Parnells on his return, and has returned to inter-county football with his native Laois. Begley has represented his country in the International Rules Series on no less than 12 occasions; in 2006 (2 test matches), 2008 (2 test matches), 2010 (2 test matches), 2011 (2 test matches), 2013 (2 test matches), 2014 (1 test match) and 2015 (1 test match). He is one of only six players (all Irish) to have played 12 or more games in the series and he is one of only two players to have won nine tests (along with Seán Marty Lockhart of Derry).

He has scored a total of 15 points for Ireland and is the second-highest scoring Laois player in the series (after Ross Munnelly).

== See also ==
- List of players who have converted from one football code to another
- The Irish Experiment
