= Ladies' Gaelic football =

Women's team sport

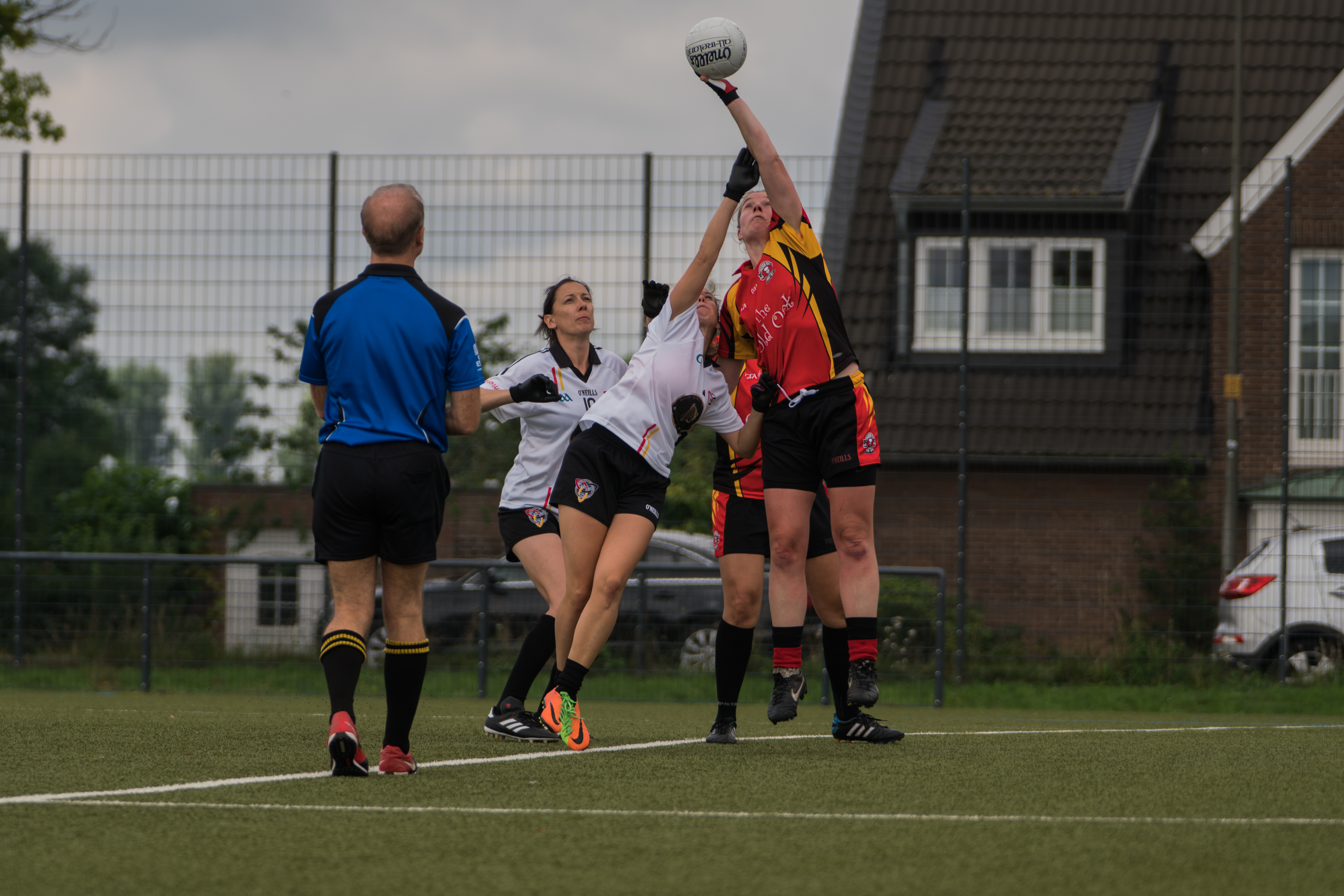
- Teams representing Germany and Belgium at the Gaelic Euro 2017 – International Football Cup
- Highest governing body: Ladies' Gaelic Football Association
- First played: 1926

Characteristics
- Contact: Limited
- Team members: 15 on each team
- Type: Team sport, ball sport
- Glossary: Glossary of Gaelic games terms

Presence
- Country or region: Republic of Ireland; Northern Ireland

Ladies' Gaelic football (Irish: Peil Ghaelach na mBan) is an Irish team sport for women. It is the women's equivalent of Gaelic football. Ladies' football is organised by the Ladies' Gaelic Football Association. Two teams of 15 players kick or hand-pass a round ball towards goals at each end of a grass pitch. The sport is an all island sport played in all 4 provinces of Ireland ( Ulster, Munster, Leinster and Connacht), where the two main competitions are the All-Ireland Senior Ladies' Football Championship and the Ladies' National Football League. Both competitions feature teams representing the traditional Gaelic games counties. The 2017 All-Ireland Senior Ladies' Football Championship final was the best attended women's sports final of 2017. The 2019 final, after the 2019 FIFA Women's World Cup Final, was the second largest attendance at any women's sporting final during 2019. Historically Cork and Kerry have been the sport's most successful counties. Waterford, Monaghan and Mayo have also experienced spells of success. In more recent years, 2017 to 2020, Dublin have been the dominant team.

Ladies' Gaelic football is also played in Africa, Asia, Great Britain, Canada, Europe, South America, the United States, New Zealand and Australia. Outside of Ireland it is mainly, although not exclusively, played by members of the Irish diaspora. There is also a seven-a-side version of the sport.

== Timeline ==
Year	Key events
1926	A parish league is organised in Cooraclare, County Clare.
c. 1964	In a tournament in County Offaly a team representing Ballycommon defeat a team representing the Marian Hostel from Tullamore in the final.
June 1968	The Dungarvan Gala Festival organise a tournament.
July 1969	The Clonmel Nationalist carries a report of a match featuring teams representing Clonmel Post Office and Tipperary County Council. The following week Clonmel Post Office play a team from the Carrick-on-Suir Exchange. The success of these two fixtures led to the formation of an eight team league. Clonmel Post Office are the inaugural champions.
1970	A league featuring teams from South Tipperary and West Waterford is played on a double round basis.
1971	Tipperary and Waterford organise Ladies' Football championships.
3 October 1971	Tipperary take on Waterford in what was (possibly) the first ever game of inter–county ladies' football. Tipperary won by a couple of points.
2 September 1973	In the first Cork Ladies' Football championship final, Knockscovane defeat Ballydaly by 3–4 to 2–3 at Banteer.
1973	During a carnival at Banteer, Kerry play Cork in an inter-county game. Kerry won by 5–10 to 4–11 with Mary Geaney scoring 2–6. The match was refereed by Dinny Long, the Cork senior men's footballer.
18 July 1974	The Ladies' Gaelic Football Association was founded at a meeting held at the Hayes' Hotel in Thurles, County Tipperary, almost ninety years after the Gaelic Athletic Association was founded in the same hotel.
13 October 1974	In Durrow, County Laois, Tipperary defeat Offaly by 2–3 to 2–2 in the first ever All-Ireland Senior Ladies' Football Championship final.
10 October 1976	Mary Geaney captains Kerry to their first All-Ireland title. In the final they defeat Offaly by 4–6 to 1–5. With 3–2, Geaney was also the top scorer in the final. She also scores the first ever hat-trick in an All-Ireland final.
1977	Mullahoran win the inaugural All-Ireland Ladies' Club Football Championship.
1979	Tipperary win the inaugural Ladies' National Football League title.
1980	The LGFA introduce their All Star awards.
1982	The LGFA is recognised by the Gaelic Athletic Association
3 October 1982	Kerry win their second All-Ireland title. They subsequently go on to dominate the championship during the 1980s, winning nine successive titles between 1982 and 1990. Between 1980 and 1991 Kerry also win eleven Ladies' National Football League titles.
12 October 1986	Kerry defeat Wexford by 1–11 to 0–8 in the first All-Ireland final played at Croke Park.
1987	Mary Immaculate College defeat University College Cork in the inaugural O'Connor Cup final.
1987	A team representing Ballymacarbry, County Waterford win the All-Ireland Ladies' Club Football Championship for the first time. Between 1987 and 1998 they win the title on ten occasions. The club also provides the nucleus of a very successful Waterford team.
11 November 1990	Kerry defeat Laois by 1–9 to 0–6 to complete a nine-in-a-row of All-Ireland titles.
13 October 1991	Waterford defeat Laois by 5–8 to 3–7 as they win their first All-Ireland title. As of 2019, this is the highest number of goals scored in a final. Between 1991 and 2000, Waterford reached nine All-Ireland finals, winning five titles. Between 1992 and 2002, they also won five Ladies' National Football League titles.
6 October 1996	Monaghan, featuring Niamh Kindlon, defeat Laois by 2–11 to 1–9, after a replay, as they win their first All-Ireland title. Between 1994 and 1998, Monaghan played in five successive All-Ireland finals, winning two titles.
3 October 1999	Mayo, featuring Cora Staunton, defeat Waterford by 0–12 to 1–8 as they win their first All-Ireland title. Between 1999 and 2003, Mayo play in five successive All-Ireland finals, winning four titles.
30 September 2001	Laois defeat Mayo by 2–14 to 1–16 as they win their first All-Ireland title. Between 1985 and 1996, Laois had played in seven All Ireland finals, finishing as a runner up on each occasion. This was also the first All-Ireland final broadcast live by TG4.
2 October 2005	Cork defeat Galway by 1–11 to 0–8 as they win their first All-Ireland title. This marked the beginning of Cork's dominance of the sport. Between 2005 and 2009, Cork were All-Ireland champions five consecutive seasons. They then achieved an All-Ireland six consecutive titles between 2011 and 2016. During this era they also won eleven consecutive Ladies' National Football League titles.
2006	An Ireland team selected by the LGFA plays against Australia in an International rules series. Ireland won the series, winning the first test by 134–15 and the second test by 39–18.
26 September 2010	Dublin win their first All-Ireland title, briefly interrupting the Cork monopoly. In the final they defeat Tyrone by 3–16 to 0–9.
December 2014	The Cork senior ladies' football team win the RTÉ Sports Team of the Year Award after winning their ninth All-Ireland title. They were the first female team to win the award. They received 27% of the vote, beating the Ireland men's national rugby union team, winners of the 2014 Six Nations Championship, by 11%.
December 2015	Dual Cork football and camogie players, Rena Buckley and Briege Corkery, were named joint winners of The Irish Times/ Sport Ireland Sportswoman of the Year Award after they both broke the record for most individual All-Ireland medals, overtaking the 15 won by the Dublin camogie player, Kathleen Mills.
24 September 2017	Dublin win their second All-Ireland title, defeating Mayo in the final by 4–11 to 0–11. The attendance of 46,286 was a record for an All-Ireland final. It was also the best attended women's sports final of 2017. The second best attended final was the 2017 FA Women's Cup Final which had an attendance of 35,271. It was also the best attended women's sporting event in Europe during 2017. A BBC Northern Ireland report declared it was "the highest attended women's sporting event in the world in 2017".
15 September 2019	Dublin complete a three-in-a-row of All-Ireland titles, after defeating Galway in the final by 2–3 to 0–4. The 2019 final was watched by a record breaking attendance of crowd of 56,114. After the 2019 FIFA Women's World Cup Final with 57,900, it was second largest attendance at any women's sporting event during 2019. For the seventh consecutive season attendance increased, with the figures more than doubling since 2013. It was also claimed that the record attendance was the largest ever attendance at a women's amateur sporting event in Europe.

== Most successful counties ==
Pos	County	All-Ireland titles	League titles	Total titles
1	Cork	11	12	23
2	Kerry	11	12	23
3	Dublin	6	2	8
4	Waterford	5	5	10
5	Mayo	4	3	7
6	Monaghan	2	4	6
7	Meath	2	1	3

== Differences from men's football ==
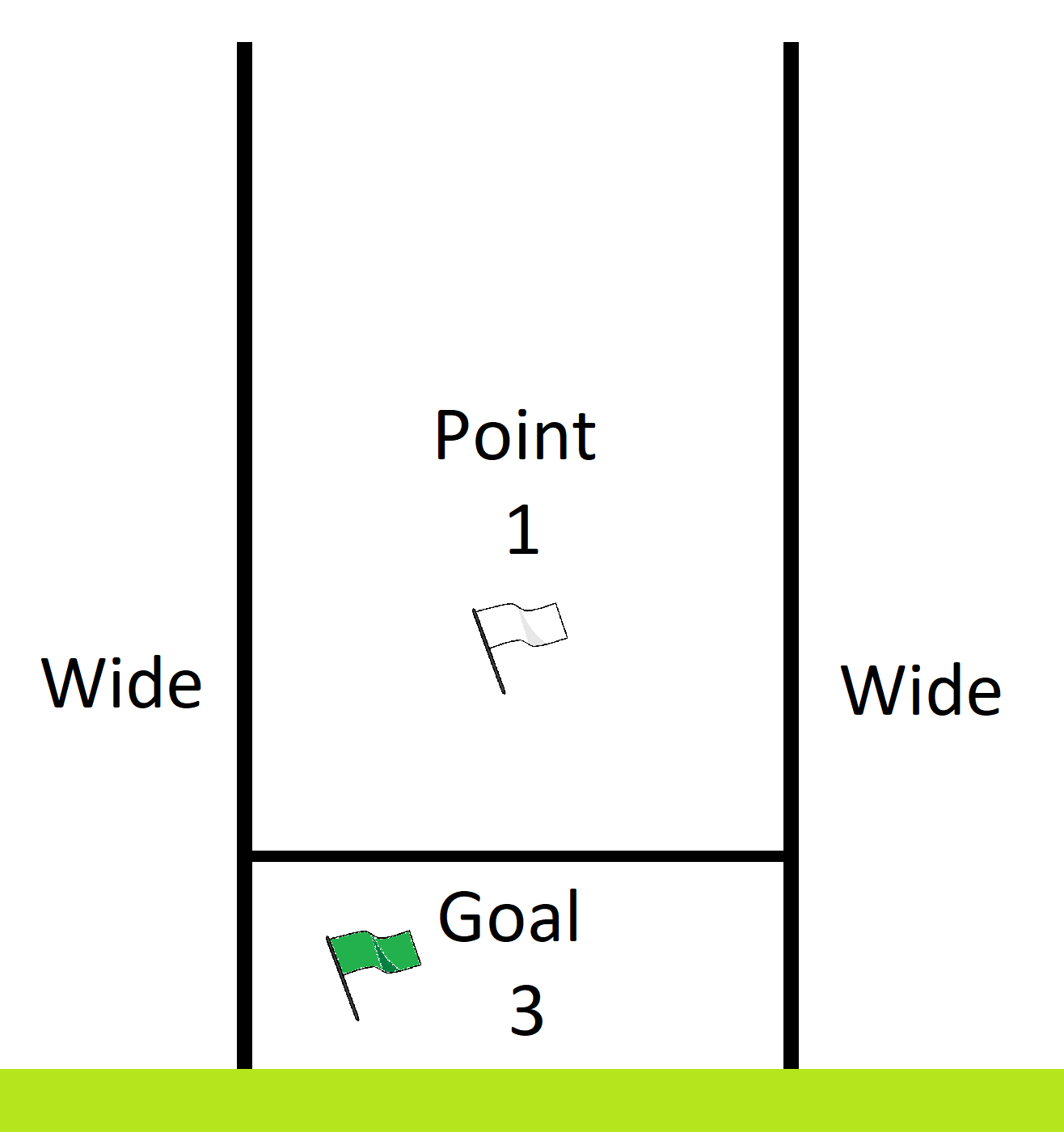
Goalposts and scoring system used in ladies' football

Most of the rules of ladies' Gaelic football are the same as those for the men's game. The main differences are:

- A player may pick the ball up directly from the ground, so long as she is standing.
- Most matches last 60 minutes; in men's senior inter-county football, games last 70 minutes.
- Kickouts may be taken from the hand.
- Changing hands: throwing the ball from your right hand to left or vice versa.
- A countdown clock with siren is used if available; in the men's game, the referee decides the end of the game.
- All deliberate bodily contact is forbidden except when "shadowing" an opponent, competing to catch the ball, or blocking the delivery of the ball.
- A smaller size 4 Gaelic ball is used compared to the size 5 ball used in the men's game.
- Since 2020 a '45 has been worth 2 points if it goes straight over without a deflection, otherwise it is worth 1 point.
