= List of players who have converted from one football code to another =

There are many footballers who have converted from one football code to another at a professional or representative level. In some cases, the player may also return to the original code, so the traffic is not merely one way.

In some countries, such as the United Kingdom, United States, Ireland and Australia, where multiple codes are popular, and the practice of switching codes is relatively common, such players are known as code converts or code hoppers. In Australia, star code converts can have a substantial impact on the games. For instance, Dally Messenger's defection from rugby union to rugby league was considered a pivotal moment in the establishment of the latter over other codes in Australia.

Globalisation is increasing the opportunities for players to transfer to different countries and to different professional sports, including the forms of football.

== From American football ==
=== American football to Association football ===
Name	Country	Top American football level	Top Association football level	American football debut	Association football debut
Boris Shlapak	USA	NFL (Baltimore Colts)	NASL (Chicago Sting)	1972	1975

=== American football to Australian rules football ===
Name	Country	Top American football level	Top Australian rules level	American football debut	Australian rules debut
Dwayne Armstrong	USA	NCAA Division I (Iowa State)	AFL reserves (Essendon)	1991	1995
Brandon Kaufman	USA	NFL (Buffalo – Practice squad)	NEAFL (Gold Coast)	2013	2016
Jacinda Barclay	USA	Legends Football League (Chicago Bliss)	AFL Women's (Greater Western Sydney)	2016	2017
Richelle Cranston	Australia	Australia, Gridiron Victoria (Geelong Buccaneers)	AFL Women's (Melbourne)(Geelong)(Western Bulldogs)	2015	2017

=== American football to Canadian football ===
American football and Canadian football are very similar gridiron codes; talented Canadian youth players are often recruited by American universities offering scholarships, and conversely the Canadian Football League enforces roster minimums for Canadian-trained players to prevent its clubs from fielding American-dominated teams. The CFL and NFL competed for the same player pool in their earlier years before the CFL settled into a de facto (and from time to time formal) developmental role to its American counterpart. Dozens of professional players move between these codes' top professional leagues every year, making any attempt at a list incomplete at best.

Two quarterbacks in particular became well known in both codes. Warren Moon, a California native who starred at the University of Washington, began his professional career with the Edmonton Eskimos before crossing the border back south to the Houston Oilers and later Minnesota Vikings, earning Hall of Fame recognition in both professional leagues. Doug Flutie, who authored a comeback win for Boston College considered an iconic moment in the history of American college football, began his professional football career in the USFL before moving on to the NFL, then played a long CFL career that led to him being the first non-Canadian honored with induction to Canada's Sports Hall of Fame, before returning to the NFL to close his football career. Dwayne Johnson played college football, and was on practice squad in the Canadian Football League. Ricky Williams played 12 seasons in the National Football League, one season in the Canadian Football League (CFL), and four years of minor league baseball for the Philadelphia Phillies.

=== American football to rugby league ===
Name	Country	Top American football level	Top rugby league level	American football debut	Rugby league debut
Manfred Moore	USA	National Football League (San Francisco/Tampa Bay/Oakland)	New South Wales Rugby Football League (Newtown)	1974	1977
Philippe Gardent	France	NFL (Washington – Practice squad)	National League One (Crusaders)	2006	2008

=== American football to rugby union ===
Name	Country	Top American football level	Top rugby union level	Top representation level	American football debut	Rugby union debut
Richard Tardits	France, USA	National Football League (New England)	Top 14 (Biarritz)	USA (15s)	1990	1994
Dan Lyle	USA	NCAA Division I FCS (Virginia Military Institute)	English Premiership (Bath/Leicester)	USA (15s)	1988	1996
Dave Hodges	USA	NCAA Division III (Occidental College)	Welsh Premiership (Llanelli)	USA (15s)	1988	1997
Leonard Peters	USA	National Football League (Chicago – Practice squad)	IRB Sevens World Series (USA)	USA (7s); USA (15s)	2007	2009
Perry Baker	USA	National Football League (Cincinnati – Injured reserve)		USA (7s)	2006	2010
Carlin Isles	USA	National Football League (Detroit – Practice squad)	Pro12 (Glasgow Warriors)	USA (7s)	2013	2014
Nate Ebner	USA	National Football League (New England)	Olympics (USA)	USA (7s)	2012	2016
Jarryd Hayne	Australia, Fiji	National Football League (San Francisco)	World Rugby Sevens Series (Fiji)	Fiji (7s)	2015	2016
Paul Lasike	New Zealand	National Football League; Arizona Cardinals Chicago Bears	Major League Rugby (Utah Warriors) Premiership Rugby (Harlequin F.C.)	USA	2015	2018
Psalm Wooching	USA & Samoa	NCAA Division I college football (University of Washington, Washington Huskies)	Major League Rugby (San Diego Legion)	USA	2012	2018

NB:

- Isles made the Detroit Lions practice squad late in the 2013 season, after having become a sevens international. However, he never appeared in an NFL game, and has since signed a professional contract in 15s.
- Tardits switched codes twice: to American football as a young adult, and back to rugby union after a brief NFL career. He played for Biarritz Olympique and the France under-21 national team before switching to American football, and played for the USA national team after returning to his original code.

== From association football ==
=== Association football to American football ===
Numerous American football placekickers grew up playing association football (soccer); however, very few have competed at a very high level in their original code. A large number of the first "soccer-style" placekickers of the 1960s, and early 1970s were Europeans and Latin Americans who changed codes in adulthood. Eventually, kickers who changed codes in adulthood were largely, though not completely, displaced by players who were either born and raised in the U.S. or immigrated to the U.S. at a relatively early age, thus receiving more exposure to American football than most of the first soccer-style placekickers.

Most of the women to have played men's American football have crossed over from association football.

Name	Country	Top association football level	Top American football level	Top representation level
Phil Alexander	England	Norwich City F.C.	London Monarchs	N/A
Clive Allen	England	Tottenham Hotspur F.C.	London Monarchs	England national football team
Jesús Angoy	Spain	FC Barcelona	Barcelona Dragons	N/A
Obed Ariri	Nigeria	Chicago Sting, P & T Vasco da Gama	Tampa Bay Buccaneers, Washington Redskins, 2 others	N/A
Brandon Aubrey	USA	Toronto FC	Dallas Cowboys	Pro Bowl (American football)
Chris Bahr	USA	Philadelphia Atoms	Oakland/LA Raiders, 2 others	N/A
Matt Bahr	USA	Colorado Caribous, Tulsa Roughnecks	Cleveland Browns, New York Giants, 4 others	N/A
Manfred Burgsmüller	Germany	Borussia Dortmund, Werder Bremen	Rhein Fire	Germany national football team
Silvio Diliberto	Netherlands	Sparta, Roda JC, Haarlem, Eindhoven	Amsterdam Admirals	
Toni Fritsch	Austria	Rapid Vienna	Dallas Cowboys, San Diego Chargers, Houston Oilers, New Orleans Saints	Austria national football team (soccer); Pro Bowl (American football)
Florian Kempf	USA	Philadelphia Fury	Houston Oilers, New Orleans Saints	N/A
Axel Kruse	GDR, Germany	Hansa Rostock, Hertha BSC, Eintracht Frankfurt, VfB Stuttgart	Berlin Thunder	East Germany national under-21 football team (soccer)
Josh Lambo	USA	FC Dallas	San Diego Chargers	United States U20 (soccer)
Toni Linhart	Austria	Wiener Sport-Club	New Orleans Saints, Baltimore Colts, New York Jets	Austria national football team Pro Bowl (American football)
Tony Meola	USA	MetroStars, Kansas City Wizards	New York Jets (did not pass tryouts)	US National Team (soccer)
Horst Mühlmann	Germany	FC Schalke 04, Bonner SC, Kansas City Spurs	Cincinnati Bengals, Philadelphia Eagles	N/A
Neil O'Donoghue	Ireland	Shamrock Rovers	Buffalo Bills, Tampa Bay Buccaneers, St. Louis Cardinals	N/A
Derek Smethurst	South Africa	Chelsea, Millwall, Tampa Bay Rowdies	Tampa Bay Buccaneers (cut due to injury)	N/A (due to apartheid, RSA banned from FIFA, 1964–91)
Liz Heaston	USA	Willamette Bearcats	Willamette Bearcats	First female to play college football
Ashley Martin	USA	Jacksonville State Gamecocks	Jacksonville State Gamecocks	First female to play NCAA football
Devin Barclay	USA	MLS	Ohio State Buckeyes football	N/A
Jon Brown	USA	Louisville Cardinals men's soccer	Louisville Cardinals football	United States men's national under-17 soccer team
Julie Harshbarger	USA	Rockford College, Benedictine University	Chicago Pythons	First female to score a field goal in professional football

=== Association football to Australian rules football ===
Following the establishment of AFL Women's in 2016 (the first professional women's Australian rules football competition), several A-League Women players switched codes as they could augment their earnings in the off-season. Foot skills are advantageous in switching between these codes and goalkeepers have an advantage in marking and ball handling.

Name	Country	Top association football level	Top Australian rules level	Top representation level	Association Football debut	Australian rules debut
Catherine Brown	Australia	Canberra United (W-League)	Hawthorn (AFL Women's)	N/A	2012	2022
Jessica Waterhouse	Australia U17	Adelaide United (W-League)	Adelaide (AFL Women's)	N/A	2012	2022
Lulu Pullar	Australia	Brisbane Roar (W-League)	Brisbane (AFL Women's)	N/A	2017	2022
Angelique Stannett	New Zealand	Perth Glory (W-League)	Fremantle (AFL Women's)	N/A	2015	2019
Marijana Rajcic	Australia	Adelaide United (W-League)	Adelaide (AFL Women's)	N/A	2009	2018
Emma Pittman	Australia	Brisbane Roar (W-League)	Brisbane/Gold Coast (AFL Women's)	N/A	2012	2018
Evangeline Gooch	Australia	Perth Glory (W-League)	Fremantle West Coast (AFL Women's)	N/A	2015	2017
Ellie Brush	Australia	Canberra United (W-League)	Greater Western Sydney (AFL Women's)	Australia (soccer)	2008	2017
Brianna Davey	Australia	Melbourne Victory (W-League); Melbourne City (W-League)	Carlton (AFL Women's)	Australia (soccer)	2010	2017
Jenna McCormick	Australia	Adelaide United (W-League); Canberra United (W-League)	Adelaide (AFL Women's)	Australia (soccer)	2012	2017
Kristi Harvey	Australia	Adelaide United (W-League)	Carlton (VFL Women's)	N/A	2009	2017
Peter Halstead	New Zealand	Team Wellington (New Zealand Football Championship)	Wellington Australian Football League (AFL New Zealand)	New Zealand (AR)	2007	2016
Broc McCauley	Australia	Queensland Roar (Brisbane Premier League)	Brisbane Lions/Hawthorn Football Club (AFL)	N/A	2006	2007
Joanne Butland	Australia	Canberra Eclipse/QAS Sting (Women's National Soccer League)	AFL Cairns	Australia (soccer); Australia (International rules)	1999	2003
Brad Green	Australia	Launceston United SC (Northern Championship)	Melbourne (AFL)	N/A (International rules captain)	1996	2000
Roger Carter	Australia	Subiaco AFC (Football West Men's League)	Centrals-Trinity Beach Bulldogs (Cairns AFL)	N/A	2007	2014

=== Association football to Gaelic football ===
Name	Country	Top association football level	Top Gaelic football level	Top representation level	Playing era
Ciarán Lyng	Ireland	Preston North End F.C., Shrewsbury Town F.C., Ireland underage teams	Wexford senior football team		2000s
Shane Supple	Ireland	Ipswich Town F.C., Falkirk F.C.	Dublin senior football team		2000s
Anthony Tohill	Ireland	Derry City F.C., Manchester United F.C. Reserves	Derry senior football team		1990s, 2000s

=== Association football to rugby league ===
Name	Country	Top association football level	Top rugby league level	Top representation level	Playing era
Ted Bateson	England	Blackburn Rovers	Wakefield Trinity	none	1920s
Albert Brough	England	Barrow A.F.C.	Oldham	Great Britain (RL)	1920s

- St Helens R.F.C. players Steve Tyrer and Matty Smith were on the books at Wigan Athletic and Everton F.C. respectively. Tyrer was a goalkeeper and Smith was a midfielder, the latter appearing in the Everton reserve team on a few occasions.
- Bill Riches signed for Hull City in 1938 and played a number of wartime matches as a centre half. Following the war he played for Batley and Hull FC at rugby league. He was also capped many times for the Yorkshire representative team. He retired in 1956.

=== Association football to rugby union ===
- Luke McAlister, a New Zealand international rugby union footballer, grew up in the north-west of England and had a trial with Manchester United before converting to rugby union at an early age.
- The late Nevin Spence, former Ulster and Ireland A player, played for Northern Ireland under 16s before switching to rugby.
- Loreto Cucchiarelli former player-coach of the Italian rugby union team, played football for Lazio at a young age.
- Conrad Jantjes played for the youth national team of South Africa in soccer, rugby union and cricket.
- Brothers Kevin O'Flanagan and Mick O'Flanagan represented Ireland in both soccer and rugby union.
- Kenny Logan, Scottish rugby internationalist had Football trials as a goalkeeper for Dundee United and Hearts.
- England international Danny Cipriani played on the junior team of Queens Park Rangers and was offered a spot in Reading's youth setup before switching to rugby. Even after his switch, he has flirted with a return to association football, having trained with QPR, Tottenham, the Colorado Rapids, and most recently MK Dons.
- Melissa Ruscoe has not only represented New Zealand in both soccer and rugby union, but has captained both sides.
- Frank Hadden, Scottish rugby player and coach, had trials with both Queens Park Rangers and Forfar Athletic, as well as being offered a contract by Raith Rovers.
- Wesley Fofana, a France international rugby union player, grew up in the Paris region of France and trained as a youth with CFF Paris before switching to rugby union as a teenager.
- Filipo Daugunu, a Fijian-Australian rugby union player changed sports after being an amateur/semi-professional goalkeeper in Fiji.
- Paulo Scanlan, a Samoan rugby 7's player changed sports after being a professional attacking midfielder in Samoa.

== From Australian rules football ==
=== Australian rules football to American football ===
Notably, the specialist role of punter in American football requires similar skills to those found in Australian football players.

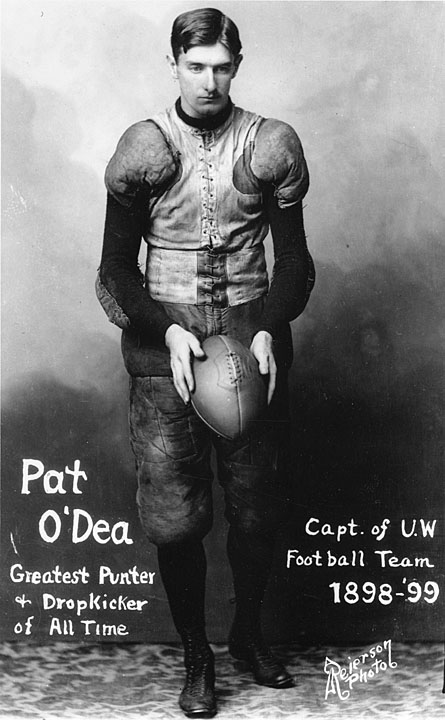
Former Australian rules footballer Pat O'Dea was regarded as one of American football's finest punters

Name	Country	Top Australian rules level	Top American football level	Australian rules debut	American football debut
Pat O'Dea	Australia	Victoria, Victorian Football Association (Melbourne)	College football (Wisconsin–Madison)	1893	1896
Colin Ridgeway	Australia	Victorian Football League reserves (Carlton)	National Football League (Dallas)	1960s	1965
Darren Bennett	Australia	Australian Football League (West Coast/Melbourne)	National Football League (San Diego/Minnesota)	1982	1995
Nathan Chapman	Australia	Australian Football League (Brisbane/Hawthorn)	National Football League (Green Bay)	1992	2004
Ben Graham	Australia	Australian Football League (Geelong)	National Football League (New York/New Orleans/Arizona/Detroit)	1992	2005
Saverio Rocca	Australia	Australian Football League (Collingwood/North Melbourne)	National Football League (Philadelphia/Washington)	1992	2007
Chris Bryan	Australia	Australian Football League (Carlton/Collingwood)	National Football League (Green Bay/Tampa Bay/New York)	2005	2010
Scott Harding	Australia	Australian Football League (Brisbane/Port Adelaide)	NCAA Division I (Hawaii)	2006	2011
Joel Wilkinson	Australia	Australian Football League (Gold Coast)	National Football League (Arizona – Practice squad)	2011	2016
Eric Wallace	United States	Victorian Football League (North Ballarat/Werribee)	National Football League (Carolina – Practice squad)	2013	2016
Lac Edwards	Australia	Victorian Football League (North Ballarat)	National Football League (New York)	2011	2016
Jacinda Barclay	Australia	West Australian Women's Football League (Swan Districts)	Legends Football League (Chicago Bliss)	2016	2017
Cameron Johnston	Australia	Victorian Football League (Casey)	National Football League (Philadelphia)	2011	2018
Michael Dickson	Australia	North East Australian Football League (Sydney Swans Reserves)	National Football League (Seattle)	2014	2018
Ben Griffiths	Australia	Australian Football League (Richmond)	NCAA Division I (University of Southern California)	2010	2019
Ben Lennon	Australia	Australian Football League (Richmond)	NCAA Division I (University of Utah)	2014	2019
Arryn Siposs	Australia	Australian Football League (St Kilda)	National Football League (Detroit Lions)	2011	2018
Max Duffy	Australia	Australian Football League (Fremantle)	NCAA Division I (University of Kentucky)	2013	2018
Richelle Cranston	New Zealand/Australia	AFL Women's (Melbourne)(Geelong)(Western Bulldogs)	Australian national women's team, Gridiron Victoria (Geelong Buccaneers)	2012	2015
Patrick Murtagh	Australia	Victorian Football League (Gold Coast)	National Football League (Jacksonville Jaguars)	2021	2024

=== Australian rules football to association football ===
International rules participation provides experience with the round ball and goalkeeping.

As well as the players below, players known to have played amateur level soccer after retiring from the AFL include Gary Ablett, James Hird, Gavin Wanganeen, Glenn Manton and Ang Christou.

Name	Country	Top Australian rules level	Top association football level	Top representation level	Australian rules debut	Association football debut
Peter Bevilaqua	Australia	Victorian Football League (Carlton)	Victorian Premier League (Brunswick Juventus)	N/A	1953	1954
Fred Agius	Australia	South Australian National Football League (Central Districts)	National Soccer League (Adelaide United)	Olyroos (Soccer)	2003	2003
Angelo Lekkas	Australia	Australian Football League (Hawthorn)	Victorian Premier League (South Melbourne)	Victoria (AR); Australia (Inter-rules)	1993	2005

=== Australian rules football to Canadian football ===
Notably, the specialist role of punter in Canadian football requires similar skills to those found in Australian football players.

Name	Country	Top Australian rules level	Top Canadian football level	Australian rules debut	Canadian football debut
Josh Bartel	Australia	Ovens & Murray Football League (Wodonga)	Canadian Football League (Hamilton/Saskatchewan)		2012

=== Australian rules football to Gaelic football ===
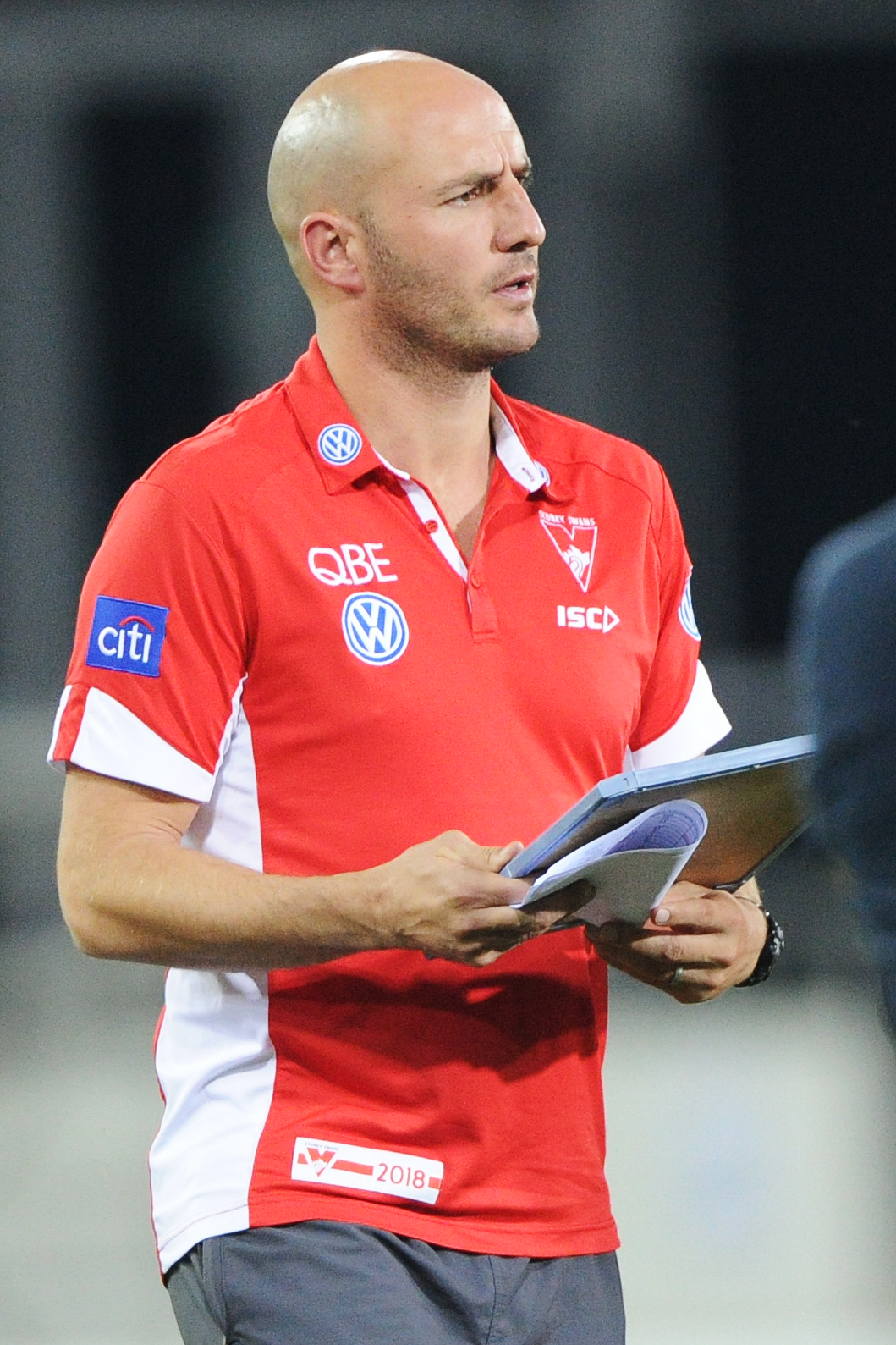
Tadhg Kennelly reached the highest level in Australian rules football then Gaelic Football, AFL Premiership medallion and a Senior All-Ireland Championship medal, the highest possible team player achievement in both sports.

Some players involved in the Irish Experiment to play professional Australian rules football returned to Ireland and went on to be notable in senior level Gaelic football. Such players have included:

Name	Country	Top Australian rules level	Top Gaelic football level	Top representation level	Australian rules debut	Gaelic football debut
Paul Earley	Ireland	Victorian Football League (Melbourne)	Gaelic Athletic Association (Roscommon)	Ireland (Inter-rules)	1984	1985
Dermot McNicholl	Ireland	Victorian Football League (St Kilda)	Gaelic Athletic Association (Derry)	Ireland (Inter-rules)	1989	1991
Anthony Tohill	Ireland	Australian Football League reserves (Melbourne)	Gaelic Athletic Association (Derry)	Ireland (Inter-rules)	1990	1991
Brian Stynes	Ireland	Australian Football League (Melbourne)	Gaelic Athletic Association (Dublin)	Ireland (Inter-rules); Ireland (AR)	1992	1995
Tadhg Kennelly	Ireland	Australian Football League (Sydney)	Gaelic Athletic Association (Kerry)	Ireland (Inter-rules)	2001	2009
Conor McKenna	Ireland	Australian Football League (Essendon)	Gaelic Athletic Association (Tyrone)	Ireland (Inter-rules)	2015	2021

=== Australian rules football to rugby league ===
Early in the history of the two codes in Australia, players would interchange the codes and even had discussions of merging them into a single game. Rugby league has since evolved to specialise in physicality and body type making it more difficult for successful conversion between the two, although it does sometimes happen at junior level, particularly in areas where both codes are played (such as the Riverina region). Though the modern specialist fullback and wing positions in rugby league can be suitable for the body type and skill of some Australian rules players. League players Darren Lockyer, Glenn Lazarus, Greg Brentnall, Chris Kinna, Eric McCormack, Laurie Daley, Bradley Clyde, Kevin Proctor, Matt Duffie, Shaun Johnson, Tom Trbojevic, Hamiso Tabuai-Fidow, William Warbrick, Kalyn Ponga and Corey Horsburgh all played Aussie Rules at a junior level.

Name	Country	Top Australian rules level	Top rugby league level	Top representation level	Australian rules debut	Rugby league debut
Eric Frauenfelder	Australia	OMFL (Albury)	QRL (Past Brothers)	New South Wales (AR); Queensland (RL)	1918	1921
Jimmy Stiff	Australia	NSWAFA (South Sydney)	NSWRL (South Sydney)	New South Wales (AR)	1925	1935
Barry Spring	Australia	Queensland Australian National Football League (Mayne)	Brisbane Rugby League (Northern Suburbs)	Queensland (AR)		1969
Ray Smith	Australia	Queensland Australian National Football League (Western Districts)	Brisbane Rugby League (Fortitude Valley)	Queensland (AR)	1963	1970
Greg Brentnall	Australia	Riverina Football League (Turvey Park)	New South Wales Rugby League (Canterbury-Bankstown)	New South Wales U18 (AR); Australia (RL)	1960s	1974
Adrian Barich	Australia	Australian Football League (West Coast)	Australian Rugby League reserves (Western Reds)	New South Wales (AR); Western Australia (AR)	1987	1995
Rhan Hooper	Australia	Australian Football League (Brisbane Lions)	Queensland Rugby League (Ipswich Jets)	–	2006	2012
Josh Hall	Australia	Australian Football League (Gold Coast)	New South Wales Cup (Penrith)	–	2012	2016
Shem Tatupu	New Zealand	Victorian Football League (Box Hill/Hawthorn)	National Rugby League (Melbourne Storm)	New Zealand (AR)	2014	-
Haneen Zreika	Australia	AFLW (GWS Giants)	NSWRL Women's Premiership (Canterbury-Bankstown Bulldogs/South Sydney Rabbitohs)	–	2018	2019
Brooke Walker	Australia	AFLW (Carlton)	NRLW (Parramatta Eels)	Victoria (RL)	2019	2020
Paige Parker	Australia	AFLW (Brisbane Lions, Gold Coast Suns)	NRLW (Newcastle Knights)	–	2019	2021
Tori Groves-Little	Australia	AFLW (Gold Coast Suns)	QRL Women's Premiership (Souths Logan Magpies)	–	2019	2024

=== Australian rules football to rugby union ===
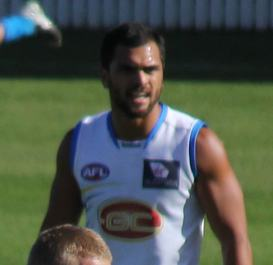
Karmichael Hunt in the AFL, who shocked fans of rugby league, Australian rules and rugby union with a highly successful 3-way code switch

Jason Akermanis was the first professional Australian football player to suggest a switch to rugby union. Nevertheless, there are still some positions and roles that have commonalities. Also at amateur level, conversion is quite common, as in the case of many start-up Australian rules clubs in countries such as France and countries such as New Zealand, Samoa and Papua New Guinea where there are dual-internationals at junior level.

Name	Country	Top Australian rules level	Top rugby union level	Top representation level	Australian rules debut	Rugby union debut
George Coulthard	Australia	Victorian Football Association (Carlton)	Waratah (NSWRU)	Victoria (AR)	1874	1877
George Henry Pritchard	Australia	Queensland Football Association (Brisbane)	Queensland Football Association (Brisbane)	Queensland (AR), Queensland (RU)	1876	1877
Alec Boswell Timms	Australia; Scotland	Victorian Football Association (Geelong)	Edinburgh University	Scotland (RU); British Isles (RU)	1892	1896
Ray Millington	Australia	Victorian Football League (Fitzroy)	Shute Shield (Randwick DRUFC)		1952	1954
Nick Evans	New Zealand	New Zealand (Under 21)	Super 12 (Highlanders)	New Zealand (AR); New Zealand (RU)	2001	2004
Rambo Tavana	Samoa	AFL International Cup (Samoa Bulldogs)	Top 14 (SU Agen)	Samoa (AR); Samoa (RU)	2002	2006
Mikaele Pesamino	Samoa	AFL International Cup (Samoa Bulldogs)	National Provincial Championship (Auckland)	Samoa (AR); Samoa (RU/7s)	2002	2007
Israel Folau	Australia	Australian Football League (Greater Western Sydney)	Super Rugby (New South Wales)	Australia (RU)	2011	2013
Stanis Susuve	Papua New Guinea	Victorian Football League (Gold Coast)	World Rugby Sevens Series (Papua New Guinea (Pukpuks))	Papua New Guinea (AR); Papua New Guinea (RU/7s)	2009	2014
Karmichael Hunt	Australia	Australian Football League (Gold Coast)	Super Rugby (Queensland)	Australia (RU)	2011	2015
Sam Dickson	New Zealand	New Zealand	New Zealand (7s) 2016 Summer Olympics	New Zealand (AR); New Zealand (7s)	2011	2016
Yoshi Harris	Nauru	Australian Football League (GWS)	Nauru (7s)	Nauru (AR), Nauru (7s)	2012	2019
William Warbrick	New Zealand	New Zealand	New Zealand (7s) (Olympics)	New Zealand (AR); New Zealand (7s)	2012	2019
Kurt Heatherley	New Zealand	Australian Football League (Hawthorn)	National Provincial Championship(Auckland)/RFU Championship; Jersey Reds)	New Zealand (AR)	2014	2019
Maddison Levi	Australia	AFLW (Gold Coast)	Australia (7s) (Olympics); Women's Uni 7s Series (Bond University)	Australia (7s)	2021	2021

== From Canadian football ==
=== Canadian football to American football ===
As discussed above, Canadian and American football are highly similar gridiron codes. Dozens if not hundreds of players and coaches move back and forth between Canadian and American codes every season and occasionally even within a season, making assembling a list of these players an impossible and largely immaterial task.

== From Gaelic football ==
Gaelic football is especially vulnerable to code-switching, for reasons outlined by rugby union journalist Hugh Farrelly in 2009:

The parochialism that is the GAA's greatest strength (every village in Ireland has a local team) is also its Achilles heel for, with no viable international outlet, the Association is vulnerable to other sports. Furthermore, a strict adherence to its amateur code means talented youngsters can be lured away from the game they grew up with... by the prospect of pay for play....

=== Gaelic football to American football ===
Name	Country	Top Gaelic football level	Top American football level	Gaelic football debut	American football debut
Jude McAtamney	Northern Ireland	Derry Under-20s	National Football League (New York Giants)	2018	2024
Charlie Smyth	Northern Ireland	Down County	National Football League (New Orleans)	2020	2024

=== Gaelic football to association football ===
Name	Country	Top Gaelic football level	Top association football level	Top representation level
Jack Kirwan	Ireland	All-Ireland Championship winner with Dublin	FA Cup winner with Tottenham Hotspur F.C.	Ireland
Val Harris	Ireland	All-Ireland Championship winner with Dublin	League of Ireland winner and Irish Cup winner with Shelbourne F.C.; Football League First Division with Everton F.C.	Ireland, Irish Free State
Con Martin	Ireland	Leinster Championship winner with Dublin	Football League First Division with Leeds United A.F.C. and Aston Villa F.C.	Ireland (FAI), Ireland (IFA)
Martin O'Neill	Northern Ireland	Derry minor team	Football League First Division winner and European Cup winner with Nottingham Forest. Former manager of the Republic of Ireland national football team	Northern Ireland
Kevin Moran	Ireland	All-Ireland Championship winner with Dublin	Football League First Division with Manchester United F.C.	Republic of Ireland
Niall Quinn	Ireland	Dublin minor team	Premiership with Arsenal F.C., Manchester City F.C. and Sunderland A.F.C.	Republic of Ireland
Neil Lennon	Northern Ireland	Armagh minor team	Scottish Premier League winner with Celtic F.C.	Northern Ireland
Kevin Doyle	Ireland	Wexford minor team	Premiership with Reading F.C. and Wolverhampton Wanderers F.C.	Republic of Ireland
Shane Long	Ireland	Tipperary minor team	Premiership with Reading F.C., West Bromwich Albion F.C, Hull City A.F.C. and Southampton F.C.	Republic of Ireland
Cillian Sheridan	Ireland	Cavan minor team	UEFA Champions League with Celtic F.C.	Republic of Ireland
Niall McGinn	Northern Ireland	Tyrone U-21s	Scored for Northern Ireland at UEFA Euro 2016	Northern Ireland
Michael O'Neill	Northern Ireland	Antrim minor team	Current manager of the Northern Ireland national football team	Northern Ireland

=== Ladies' Gaelic football to association football ===
Several ladies Gaelic footballers, including All-Ireland finalists, Niamh Fahey and Sarah Rowe, have gone on to represent the Republic of Ireland women's national association football team.

Player	Gaelic football	Association football
Amber Barrett	Donegal	Republic of Ireland
Megan Connolly	Cork ^{(Note 1)}	Republic of Ireland
Marie Curtin	Limerick	Republic of Ireland
Niamh Fahey	Galway	Republic of Ireland
Dora Gorman	Galway	Republic of Ireland
Ciara Grant	Donegal	Republic of Ireland
Una Harkin	Derry	Northern Ireland
Siobhán Killeen	Dublin	Republic of Ireland
Kirsty McGuinness	Antrim	Northern Ireland
Valerie Mulcahy	Cork	Republic of Ireland ^{(Note 2)}
Sarah Rowe	Mayo	Republic of Ireland
Julie-Ann Russell	Galway	Republic of Ireland
Nora Stapleton	Donegal	UCD
Cora Staunton	Mayo	Mayo Ladies League
Hannah Tyrrell	Dublin	St Catherine's/Shamrock Rovers

Notes

- ^1 Megan Connolly represented Cork at under-16 level.
- ^2 Valerie Mulcahy represented Ireland at the 2003 Summer Universiade.

=== Gaelic football to Australian rules football ===
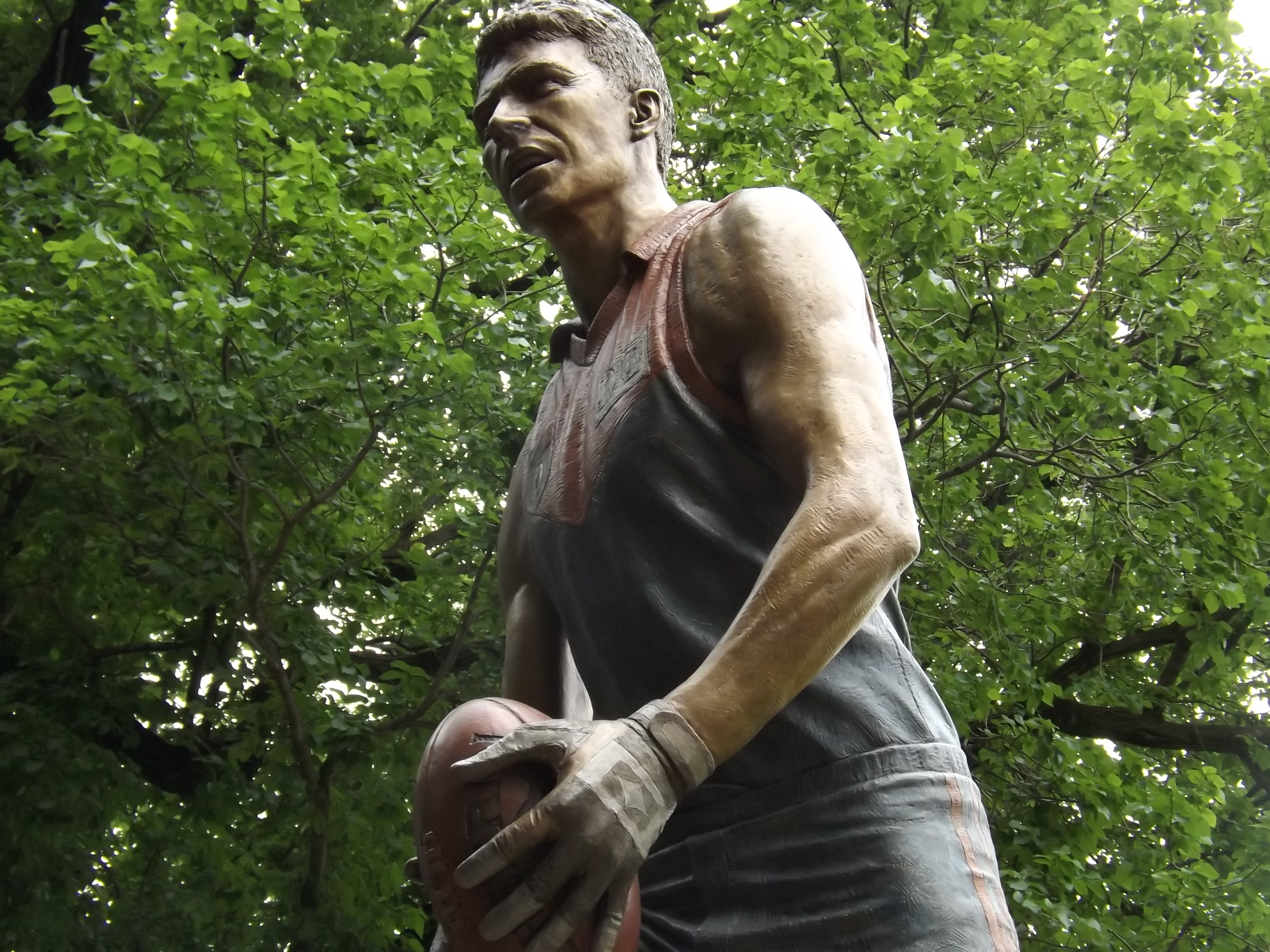
Statue of Jim Stynes, the most decorated player to switch from Gaelic football to Australian Rules

These two codes share many similarities, making switching between them relatively easy. International rules representation for players of both codes is common. The Gaelic Athletic Association prohibits professionalism, meaning that there is a financial lure for players to compete in the professional elite Aussie Rules competitions in Australia.

Name	Country	Top Gaelic level	Top Australian rules level	Top representation level	Gaelic football debut	Australian rules debut
Sean Wight	Ireland	Kerry minor (Under-18)	AFL	NA	1982	1985
Paul Earley	Ireland	Gaelic Athletic Association	AFL	NA	1982	1984
Dermot McNicholl	Ireland	Derry All-Ireland winner 1993	AFL	NA	1980	1990
Brian Stynes	Ireland	Dublin All-Ireland winner 1995	AFL	Ireland (Inter-rules); Ireland (AR)	198?	1992
Jim Stynes	Ireland	Dublin All-Ireland (Minor) winner 1994	AFL (Brownlow Medallist)	Ireland (Inter-rules)	1984	1987
Tadhg Kennelly	Ireland	Kerry All-Ireland winner 2009	AFL premiership 2005	Ireland (Inter-rules)		2001
Colm Begley	Ireland	Laois GAA	AFL	Ireland (Inter-rules)		2006
Martin Clarke	Ireland	Down All-Ireland (Minor) winner 2005	AFL	Ireland (Inter-rules)		2005
Pearce Hanley	Ireland	Mayo GAA	AFL	Ireland (Inter-rules)		2008
Michael Quinn	Ireland	Gaelic Athletic Association	AFL	N/A		2009
Kevin Dyas	Ireland	Armagh GAA	AFL	N/A		2009
Jamie O'Reilly	Ireland	Down GAA	AFL	N/A		2010
Zach Tuohy	Ireland	Laois GAA	AFL premiership 2022	Ireland (Inter-rules)		2011
Caolan Mooney	Ireland	Down GAA	AFL	N/A		2012
Tommy Walsh	Ireland	Kerry All-Ireland winner 2007 & 2009	AFL	Ireland (Inter-rules)		2012
Ciarán Byrne	Ireland	Louth GAA	AFL	Ireland (Inter-rules)		2014
Patrick Brophy	Ireland	Kildare GAA	AFL	Ireland (Inter-rules)		2015
Conor McKenna	Ireland	Tyrone GAA	AFL	Ireland (Inter-rules)		2015
Mark O'Connor	Ireland	Kerry All-Ireland minor winner 2015 & 2016	AFL	N/A		2017
Liam O'Connell	Ireland	Cork	AFL	N/A		2025

=== Ladies' Gaelic football to Australian rules football ===
Currently on an AFL senior list

Ladies' Gaelic football players in the AFLW
Player	Gaelic football	AFLW team	AFLW debut	Notes
Yvonne Bonner	Donegal	Greater Western Sydney	2019	
Amy Boyle-Carr	Donegal	Adelaide	2024	
Ailish Considine	Clare	Adelaide	2019	
Kayleigh Cronin	Kerry	Adelaide	2025	
Joanne Doonan	Fermanagh	Carlton	2020	
Laura Duryea	Cavan	Melbourne	2017	First Irish player to play in AFLW. First AFLW player to represent Ireland in Australian rules.
Clara Fitzpatrick	Down	St Kilda	2020	
Kate Flood	Louth	Fremantle	2019	
Aileen Gilroy	Mayo	North Melbourne	2020	
Sinéad Goldrick	Dublin	Melbourne	2020	
Katy Herron	Donegal	Western Bulldogs	2020	
Grace Kelly	Mayo	West Coast	2020	
Niamh Kelly	Mayo	West Coast	2020	
Aisling McCarthy	Tipperary	Western Bulldogs	2019	
Niamh McEvoy	Dublin	Melbourne	2020	
Orla O'Dwyer	Tipperary	Brisbane	2020	
Sarah Rowe	Mayo	Collingwood	2019	
Aishling Sheridan	Mayo	Collingwood	2019	
Mairéad Seoighe	Galway	North Melbourne		
Bríd Stack	Cork	Greater Western Sydney	2021	
Cora Staunton	Mayo	Greater Western Sydney	2018	First Irish player actively recruited to AFLW
Áine Tighe	Leitrim	Fremantle		
Bree White	London	Collingwood	2017	

=== Gaelic football to rugby league ===
Name	Country	Top Gaelic football level	Top rugby league level	Top representation level	Gaelic football debut	Rugby league debut
Brian Carney	Ireland	Gaelic Athletic Association (Valleymount)	Super League (Gateshead/Hull/Wigan)	Ireland (RL); Great Britain (RL)	1998	1999

=== Gaelic football to rugby union ===
Up until the mid-1990s, both codes were officially amateur. However, the professionalisation of rugby union has provided a financial lure.

Name	Country	Top Gaelic football level	Top rugby union level	Top representation level	Playing era
Dick Spring	Ireland	Kerry senior team	Munster, London Irish	Ireland	1960s, 1970s
Moss Keane	Ireland	UCC GAA, Kerry under-21 team	Munster	Ireland, British and Irish Lions	1970s, 1980s
David Beggy	Ireland	Meath senior team	Leinster	N/A	1980s, 1990s
Brian Rigney	Ireland	Local Team, Laois	Leinster	Ireland	1980s, 1990s
Mick Galwey	Ireland	Kerry senior team	Munster	Ireland	1980s, 1990s, 2000s,
Brian Carney	Ireland	Valleymount junior team	Munster	Ireland	1990s, 2000s
Shane Byrne	Ireland	Aughrim minor team	Leinster, Saracens	Ireland, British and Irish Lions	1990s, 2000s
Geordan Murphy	Ireland	Kildare minor team	Leicester Tigers	Ireland, British and Irish Lions	1990s, 2000s, 2010s
Shane Horgan	Ireland	Meath minor team	Leinster	Ireland, British and Irish Lions	1990s, 2000s, 2010s
Gavin Duffy	Ireland	Mayo minor team	Connacht, NEC Harlequins	Ireland	1990s, 2000s, 2010s
Tomás O'Leary	Ireland	Cork minor team	Munster, London Irish	Ireland	2000s, 2010s
Tommy Bowe	Ireland	Monaghan minor team	Ulster, Ospreys	Ireland, British and Irish Lions	2000s, 2010s
Rob Kearney	Ireland	Louth minor team	Leinster	Ireland, British and Irish Lions	2000s, 2010s
Robbie Henshaw	Ireland	Westmeath minor team	Connacht, Leinster	Ireland, British and Irish Lions	2010s
Tiernan O'Halloran	Ireland	Galway minor team	Connacht	Ireland	2010s

NB: Byrne and Duffy both changed codes twice. Each first switched to rugby union as a teenager, then returned to Gaelic football after a long professional rugby career. This entry discusses their Gaelic football careers before their first code switch.

=== Ladies' Gaelic football to rugby union ===
Lindsay Peat played for Dublin in the 2009, 2010 and 2014 All-Ireland finals before playing for Ireland in the 2017 Women's Rugby World Cup. The Ireland squad featured at least six other former ladies' inter-county footballers – Niamh Briggs, Claire Molloy, Cliodhna Moloney, Katie Fitzhenry, Nora Stapleton and Hannah Tyrrell.

Player	Gaelic football	Rugby union
Niamh Briggs	Waterford	Ireland
Katie Fitzhenry	Wexford	Ireland
Claire Molloy	Galway	Ireland
Cliodhna Moloney	Galway	Ireland
Lindsay Peat	Dublin	Ireland
Nora Stapleton	Donegal	Ireland
Hannah Tyrrell	Dublin	Ireland

== From rugby league ==
=== Rugby league to American football ===
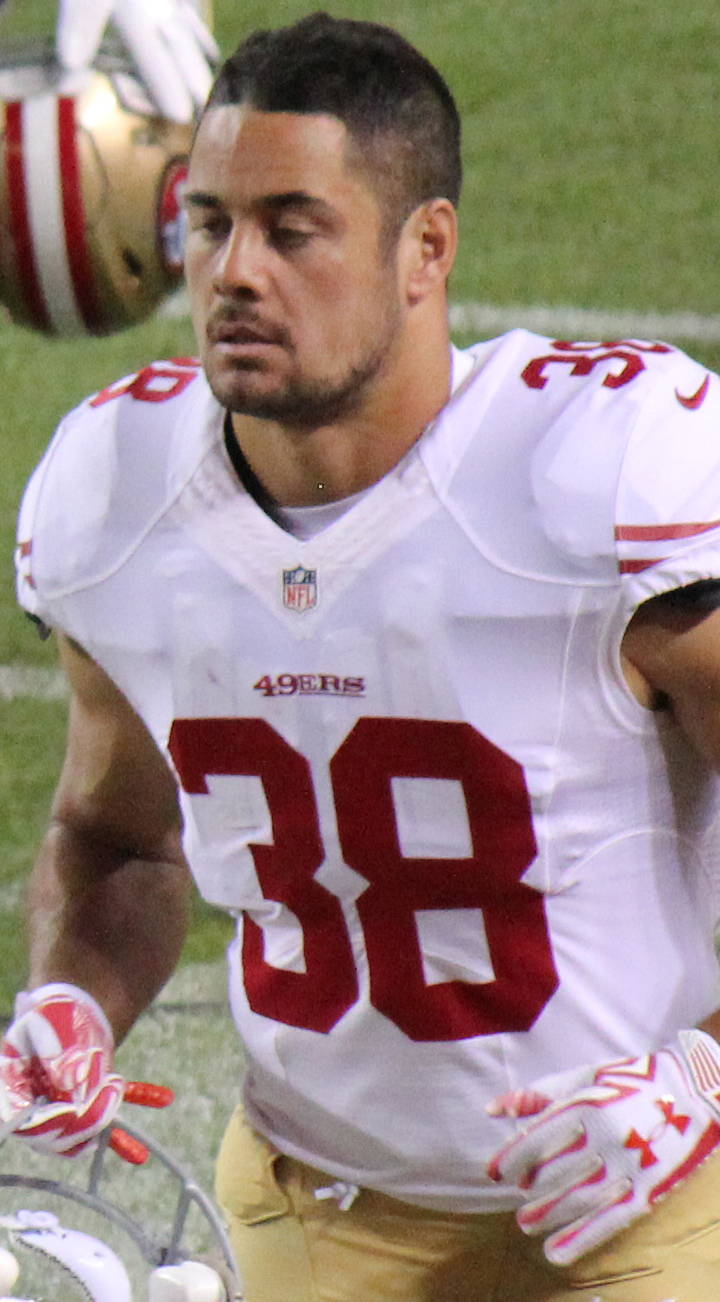
Jarryd Hayne, former rugby league great, playing for the San Francisco 49ers during his successful conversion to American Football

On 3 March 2015 Jarryd Hayne became the first rugby league player (that hadn't already played in the NFL) to sign a contract with a National Football League team.

Name	Country	Top rugby league level	Top American football level	Top representation level	Rugby league debut	American football debut
Manfred Moore	USA	New South Wales Rugby League (Newtown)	National Football League (Minnesota)	N/A	1977	1978
Jarryd Hayne	Australia	National Rugby League (Parramatta)	National Football League (San Francisco)	Australia (RL); Fiji (RL)	2006	2015
Jordan Mailata	Australia	National Youth Competition (South Sydney)	National Football League (Philadelphia)	N/A	2017	2018
Valentine Holmes	Australia	National Rugby League (Cronulla)	National Football League (New York)	Australia (RL)	2014	2019
Jotham Russell	Australia	Gold Coast Rugby League (Currumbin)	National Football League (New England)	N/A	2020	2024

=== Rugby league to association football ===
Name	Country	Top rugby league level	Top association football level	Top representation level	Playing era
Albert Brough	England	Barrow	Barrow A.F.C.		1920s

=== Rugby league to Australian rules football ===
In addition to the senior players listed below numerous schoolboy rugby league players have made a transition to success at senior Australian rules, including Wayne Carey, Paul Kelly, Kieren Jack, Andrew McLeod, Jared Brennan, Matthew Whelan, and Sam Gilbert.

Name	Country	Top rugby league level	Top Australian rules level	Top representation level	Rugby league debut	Australian rules debut
Ray Smith	Australia	Brisbane Rugby League (Fortitude Valley)	Victorian Football League (Essendon/Melbourne)	Queensland (RL); Queensland (AR)	1970	1971
Joe Buboi	Papua New Guinea	Kumuls (captain)	Papua New Guinea	Papua New Guinea national rugby league team (RL) (captain); Papua New Guinea (AR) (captain)	1970	1973
Michael McLean	Australia	Northern Territory Rugby League (Nightcliff Dragons)	Australian Football League (Footscray/Brisbane)	Aboriginal All-Stars (AR)	1980	1983
Fabian Francis	Australia	Northern Territory Rugby League (Litchfield)	Australian Football League (Melbourne/Brisbane/Port Adelaide)	Northern Territory (RL); Aboriginal All-Stars (AR)	1992	1993
Andriu Sucu	New Zealand	Auckland Rugby League (Northcote)	New Zealand	New Zealand (AR)	2000	2005
Israel Folau	Australia	National Rugby League (Melbourne/Brisbane)	Australian Football League (Greater Western Sydney)	Australia (RL)	2007	2010
Ben Barba	Australia	National Rugby League (Canterbury/Brisbane/Cronulla)	AFL Mackay (Eastern Mackay) / North Queensland	Australia (RL)	2008	2020
Tom Robertson	Australia	Jersey Flegg Cup (Canberra Raiders)	AFL Canberra (Eastlake)		2020	2021

=== Rugby league to rugby union ===
While the traffic used to be almost entirely from rugby union to rugby league, the tide has now turned the other way, and numerous rugby league players have gone over to union, since the game was professionalised.

Name	Country	Top rugby league level	Top rugby union level	Top representation level	Rugby league debut	Rugby union debut
Ben Barba	Australia	National Rugby League	Top 14	Australia (RL)	2008	2017
Josh Charnley	England	Super League	Premiership Rugby	England (RL)	2010	2016
Sam Burgess	England	National Rugby League, Super League	Premiership Rugby	England (RL), Great Brittan (RL), NRL All-Stars (RL), England (RU)	2006	2014
Reece Robinson	Lebanon, Australia	National Rugby League	Super Rugby	Lebanon (RL), Indigenous All-Stars (RL)	2008	2016
Matt Duffie	New Zealand	National Rugby League	Super Rugby	New Zealand (RL), New Zealand (RU)	2010	2016
Karmichael Hunt	New Zealand, Australia	National Rugby League	Top 14, Super Rugby	Australia (RL), Australia (RU)	2004	2009
Chris Ashton	England	Super League	English Premiership	England (RL), England (RU)	2005	2007
Lee Smith	England	Super League	English Premiership	England (RL), Great Britain (RL)	2005	2009
Berrick Barnes	Australia	NRL	Super Rugby	Australia (RU)	2005	2006
Nathan Blacklock	Australia	NRL/Super League	Super 12	Australia (RL)	1995	2003
Willie Carne	Australia	NRL	Super Rugby	Australia (RL)	1990	1997
Brian Carney	Ireland	Super League/NRL	Celtic League	Great Britain (RL), Ireland (RU)	1999	2007
Ryan Cross	Australia	NRL	Super Rugby	Australia (RU)	1998	2007
Andy Farrell	England	Super League	English Premiership	Great Britain (RL), England (RU)	1991	2005
Paul Franze	Australia	NRL	English Premiership	Australia (RL)	2002	2006
Iestyn Harris	Wales	Super League	Heineken Cup, Celtic League	Great Britain (RL), Wales (RU)	1993	2001
Sam Harris	Australia	NRL	Super Rugby	Australian Schoolboys (RU), City v. Country (RL)	2003	2007
Wise Kativerata	Australia	NRL	Shute Shield	Australia Sevens (RU)	2001	2004
Ben MacDougall	Australia	NRL	Celtic League	Scotland (RU)	1998	2006
Stephen Myler	England	Super League	English Premiership	England Saxons (RU)	2001	2006
Henry Paul	New Zealand	NRL	English Premiership	New Zealand (RL), England (RU)	1993	2001
Jason Robinson	England	Super League	English Premiership	Great Britain (RL), England (RU), British & Irish Lions (RU)	1991	1996
Mat Rogers	Australia	NRL	Super Rugby	Australia (RL/RU)	1995	2002
Wendell Sailor	Australia	NRL	Super Rugby	Australia (RL/RU)	1993	2002
Clinton Schifcofske	Australia	NRL/Super League	Super Rugby	State of Origin (RL), Australia A (RU)	1996	2006
Timana Tahu	Australia	NRL	Super Rugby	Australia (RL/RU)	1999	2008
Alan Tait	Scotland	Super League	Celtic League	Scotland (RL/RU), Great Britain (RL), British & Irish Lions (RU)	1988	1996
Brad Thorn	Australia	NRL	Super Rugby	Australia (RL), New Zealand (RU)	1994	2001
Lote Tuqiri	Australia	NRL	Super Rugby	Australia (RL/RU), Fiji (RL)	1999	2003
Lesley Vainikolo	England	NRL, Super League	English Premiership	New Zealand (RL), England (RU)	2002	2007
Andrew Walker	Australia	NRL	Super Rugby	Australia (RL/RU)	1991	2000
Chev Walker	England	Super League	English Premiership	Great Britain (RL), England Saxons (RU)	1999	2007
Barrie-Jon Mather	England	RFL Championship/Super League	England RU	Great Britain (RL), England (RL), England (RU)	1992	1998
Sonny Bill Williams	New Zealand	NRL	Top 14, Super Rugby	New Zealand (RL), New Zealand (RU)	2004	2008
Craig Wing	Australia	NRL	Top League	Australian Kangaroos (RL), Japan (RU)	2002	2010
Craig Gower	Australia	NRL	Top 14	Australian Kangaroos (RL), Italy (RU)	1996	2008
Mark Gasnier	Australia	NRL	Top 14	Australian Kangaroos (RL)	2000	2008
Shontayne Hape	New Zealand	NRL, Super League	English Premiership	New Zealand Kiwis (RL), England (RU)	2003	2008
Fabrice Estebanez	France	Super League	Top 14	France (RL), France (RU)	2005	2010
Tasesa Lavea	New Zealand	NRL	Super rugby, Top 14	New Zealand Kiwis (RL), Samoa (RU)	2000	2010
Cooper Vuna	New Zealand	NRL	Super rugby	Tonga (RL), Australia (RU), Tonga (RU)	2008	2012
Setaimata Sa	New Zealand, Samoa	NRL, Super League	English Premiership	New Zealand Kiwis (RL), Samoa (RL), Samoa (RU)	2008	2012
Peter Ryan	Australia	NRL	Super Rugby	Queensland (RL)	1989	2000
Jarrod Saffy	Australia	NRL	Super Rugby	Australia Sevens (RU)	2006	2011

== From rugby union ==
=== Rugby union to American football ===
Rugby union and American football share the same origins, but have evolved into very different games. Both are very physical and require similar body types with high speed and strength.

Name	Country	Top rugby union level	Top American football level	Top representation level	Playing era
Colin Scotts	Australia	Australian schoolboys	NFL, St. Louis Cardinals	Australia	1980s
Steve Tasker	United States	Northwestern University	NFL, Buffalo Bills	Pro Bowl	1985–1997
Gavin Hastings	Scotland	International	WLAF	Scotland/British Lions	1990s
Gary Parker	Scotland	Club (Melrose RFC)	WLAF	N/A	1980s/90s
Gary Anderson	South Africa	Brettonwood High School, Durban, South Africa	NFL, Pittsburgh Steelers, Philadelphia Eagles, San Francisco 49ers, Minnesota Vikings, Tennessee Titans	N/A	1982–2004
Richard Tardits	France, later USA	Biarritz Olympique, USA	NFL, Arizona Cardinals, New England Patriots	USA Rugby	1980s/90s
David Dixon	New Zealand	New Zealand under-19	NFL, Minnesota Vikings	New Zealand	1994–2004
Haloti Ngata	United States	Highland High School, Salt Lake City, Utah	NFL, Baltimore Ravens	N/A	2006–2018
Stewart Bradley	United States	Highland High School, Salt Lake City, Utah	NFL, Philadelphia Eagles	N/A	2007–2013
Hayden Smith	Australia	Premiership Rugby	NFL, New York Jets	USA Rugby	2012–2013
Nate Ebner	USA	Olympics (USA)	National Football League (New England)	USA (7s)	2012–
Daniel Adongo	Kenya	Super Rugby	NFL, Indianapolis Colts		2011–2015
Alex Gray	England	Premiership Rugby	NFL, Atlanta Falcons		2017–2020
Christian Scotland-Williamson	England	Premiership Rugby	NFL, Pittsburgh Steelers		2018–2020
Christian Wade	England	Premiership Rugby	NFL, Buffalo Bills		2019–
Leki Fotu	Tonga & United States	High school Rugby; Herriman High School	NFL, Arizona Cardinals		2020–
Louis Rees-Zammit	Wales	Premiership Rugby, 6 Nations rugby, Rugby World Cup	NFL, Kansas City Chiefs, Jacksonville Jaguars	Wales, British and Irish Lions (2021)	2018-
Jamie Gillan	Scotland	Scottish National League^{Highland RFC}	NFL, Cleveland Browns, New York Giants		2019–

=== Rugby union to association football ===
Name	Country	Top rugby union level	Top association football level	Top representation level	Playing era
J.W. Sutcliffe	England	Bradford F.C./Heckmondwike	Bolton Wanderers/Manchester United	England (both)	1880s/1910s
Adam Holloway	England	Henley Hawks/ Crusaders	Strathcona Terriers FC	England/New Zealand/Canada	2000s
Tony Ward	Ireland	Munster/Ireland/British and Irish Lions	Shamrock Rovers/Limerick United	British and Irish Lions	1970s and 1980s
Tommy Moroney	Ireland	Munster	West Ham United	Republic of Ireland	1940s
Aaron Ramsey	Wales	Caerphilly RFC (youth team)	Cardiff City/Arsenal/Juventus	Wales	2000s - 2020s
Henry Renny-Tailyour	Scotland	Scotland	Royal Engineers A.F.C.	Scotland	1870s, 1880s
Martín Terán	Argentina	Tucumán Rugby Club, Nacional de Clubes	Atlético Tucumán	Argentina	1996–1997
Ted Bateson	England	Yorkshire, Skipton RFC	Blackburn Rovers	Yorkshire (RU)	1920s

=== Rugby union to Australian rules football ===
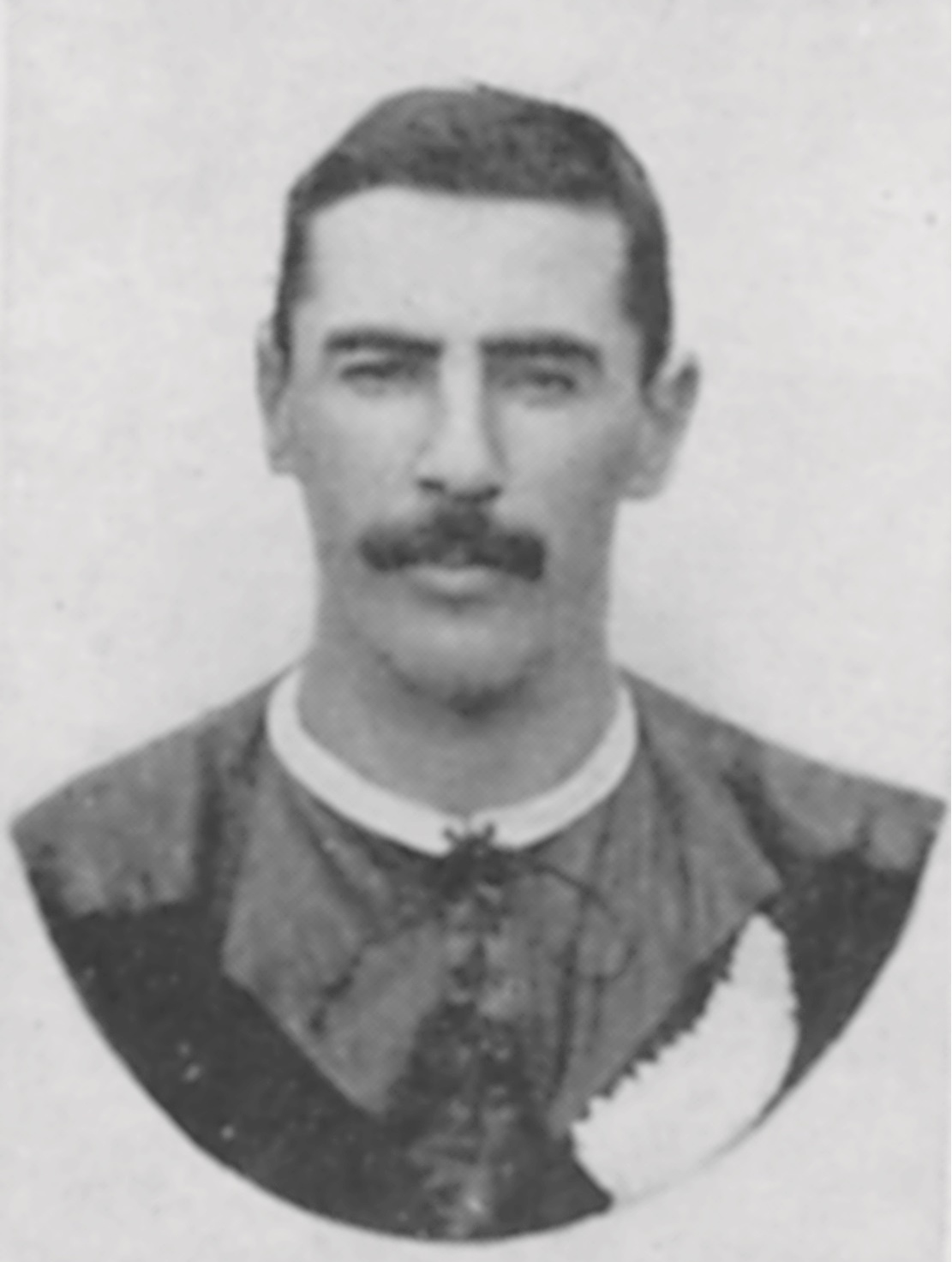
Tall and athletic, George A. Gillett represented New Zealand in 3 football codes: Rugby Union, Australian Rules and Rugby League between 1899 and 1914

In recent years, several schoolboy rugby union players have made a transition to Australian Rules, including Ray Smith (Queensland Under 19), Jim Stynes, Lewis Roberts-Thomson, Aaron Edwards, Adam Campbell (New Zealand Under 15), Daniel Merrett, Brad Moran (West Midlands (England) Under 16) and Tom Williams (Queensland Under 16). In 2012, Canadian Mike Pyke became the first former professional rugby player to win an AFL premiership.

Name	Country	Top rugby union level	Top Australian rules level	Top representation level	Rugby union debut	Australian rules debut
Andrew Stoddart	England	British & Irish Lions	Great Britain	British & Irish Lions (RU); Great Britain (AR)	1886	1888
George A. Gillett	New Zealand	New Zealand	New Zealand, Western Australia	New Zealand (RU); New Zealand (AR)	1899	1908
Mike Pyke	Canada	Top 14 (France) (US Montauban)	Australian Football League (Sydney) premiership	Canada (RU)	2002	2009
Karmichael Hunt	Australia	Top 14 (France) (Biarritz)	Australian Football League (Gold Coast)	French Barbarians (RU)	2009	2011
Chloe Dalton	Australia	Olympics (Australia)	AFL Women's (Carlton)	Australia (RU7s)	2014	2019
Conor Nash	Ireland	Leinster Rugby (Ireland)	Australian Football League (Hawthorn)	Ireland U18 (RU)	2016	2017
Kendra Heil	Canada	Guelph Gryphons	AFL Women's (Collingwood Football Club)	Canada (AR)	2007	2016
Brooke Walker	Australia	World Sevens Series (Australia)	AFL Women's (Carlton)	Australia (RU7s)	2015	2019
Mhicca Carter	Australia	Super W (Force)	AFL Women's (West Coast)	Australia A (RU)	2018	2019
Courtney Hodder	Australia	Super W (Force/Reds)	AFL Women's (Brisbane) premiership	Australia A (RU)	2018	2021
Grace Brooker	New Zealand	New Zealand	AFL Women's (Essendon)	New Zealand (RU)	2019	2025

=== Rugby union to Gaelic football ===
Name	Country	Top rugby union level	Top Gaelic football level	Top representation level	Playing era
Jarlath Fallon	Ireland	Galwegians, Connacht	Tuam Stars senior team, Galway senior team	Galway senior team	1990s, 2000s
Shane Byrne	Ireland	Leinster, Ireland, British and Irish Lions	Aughrim senior team		1990s, 2000s
Eric Miller	Ireland	Leicester Tigers, Leinster, Barbarians, Ireland, British and Irish Lions	Ballyboden St. Enda's GAA, Dublin senior team	Barbarians, Ireland, British and Irish Lions	1990s, 2000s
Gavin Duffy	Ireland	Connacht, Harlequins, Ireland	Salthill-Knocknacarra senior team, Mayo senior team	Ireland	2000s, 2010s

=== Rugby union to rugby league ===
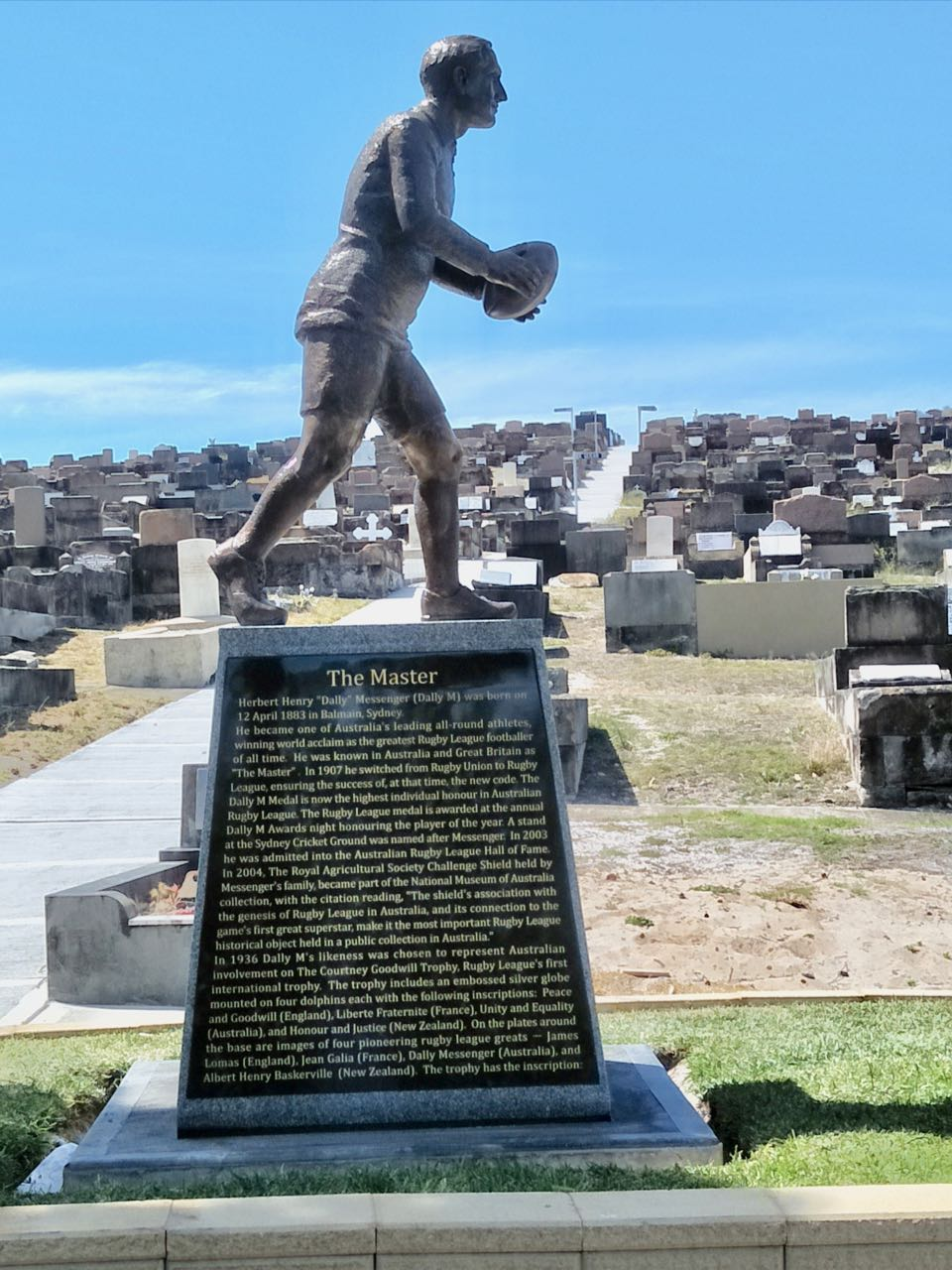
Statue of Dally Messenger at Eastern Suburbs Memorial Park in Sydney, whose sensational switch from union to league changed the Australian sporting landscape.

Two of the closest codes, they share many similar skills. Until 1995 union was officially amateur and union players were offered money to switch codes. That trend has since reversed, as rugby union is now richer than rugby league. Conversion from one code to the other is more difficult for forwards than backs, where the skills are most similar. Several players, including Iestyn Harris and Mat Rogers, have converted between the two codes on more than one occasion.

Name	Country	Top rugby union level	Top rugby league level	Top representation level	Playing era
Frano Botica	New Zealand	All Blacks	NZ Kiwis, NRL	New Zealand (RU/RL) Croatia (RU)	1980/90s
Charlotte Caslick	Australia	Wallaroos	NRL Women's Premiership	Australia (RU/RL)	2010/20s
Ellia Green	Australia	Wallaroos	NRL Women's Premiership	Australia (RU/RL)	2010/20s
Michael Cleary	Australia	Wallabies	NSWRL	Australia (RU/RL)	1960s
Ryan Cross	Australia	Wallabies	NRL	Australian Schoolboys (RU)	2000s
Arthur Daniels	Wales	Club (Llanelli)	Rugby Football League Championship	Wales/Great Britain (RL)	1940s/50s
Jonathan Davies	Wales	Welsh Premier Division	Super League	Wales/Great Britain (RL) Wales (RU)	1980s/90s
Marc Ellis	New Zealand	All Blacks	NRL	New Zealand (RU/RL)	1990s
Rocky Elsom	Australia	Wallabies	Junior	Australia (RU)	2000s
George Fairbairn	Scotland	SRU national league/Kelso RFC	Rugby Football League Championship	Great Britain	1970/80s
Russell Fairfax	Australia	Wallabies	NSWRL	Australia (RU)	1970s
Ray French	England	England	Rugby Football League Championship	Great Britain	
John Gallagher	New Zealand	All Blacks	Super League	New Zealand (RU)	1980s
Scott Gibbs	Wales	Welsh Premier Division	Super League	Wales/Great Britain (RL/RU)	1990s
Scott Gourley	Australia	Wallabies	NSWRL	Australia (RU/RL)	1980s
Daryl Halligan	New Zealand	NPC	NZ Kiwis	New Zealand (RL)	1990s
Sam Harris	Australia	Super Rugby	NRL	Australian Schoolboys (RU) City v. Country (RL)	2000s
Jarryd Hayne	Australia	World Rugby Sevens Series	NRL (Gold Coast)	Fiji (RU 7s) Australia (RL)	2006-
Nigel Heslop	England	International	Rugby Football League Championship	England	1990s
Craig Innes	New Zealand	All Blacks	NRL	New Zealand (RU/RL)	1990s
Ben Kennedy	Australia	Australian U-21	NRL	Australia (RL)	1990s/2000s
Wally Lewis	Australia	Australian Schoolboys	NRL	Australia (RL)	1977/1992
Cooper Cronk	Australia	Australian Schoolboys	NRL	Australia (RL)	2000s
John Kirwan	New Zealand	All Blacks	NRL	New Zealand (RU)	1980/90s
Tony Melrose	Australia	Australian Schoolboys	NSWRL	Australia (RU)	1980s
Dally Messenger	Australia	Wallabies	NSWRL	Australia (RL)	1900s
Garrick Morgan	Australia	Wallabies	NRL	Australia (RU)	1990s
Rex Mossop	Australia	Wallabies	NSWRL	Australia (RU/RL)	1950s
Noa Nadruku	Fiji	Fiji international	National Rugby League	Fiji (RU/RL)	1990s
Michael O'Connor	Australia	Wallabies	NSWRL	Australia (RU/RL)	1980/90s
Brett Papworth	Australia	Wallabies	NSWRL	Australia (RU)	1980s
Ray Price	Australia	Wallabies	NSWRL	Australia (RU/RL)	1980s
Scott Quinnell	Wales	Wales	Super League	Wales (RU/RL)	1990s/2000s
Matthew Ridge	New Zealand	All Blacks	NRL	New Zealand (RU/RL)	1980s/90s
Kevin Ryan	Australia	Wallabies	NSWRL	Australia (RU/RL)	1950s/1960s
Wendell Sailor	Australia	Wallabies	Kangaroos	Australia (RU/RL)	1990s/2000s
Brian Smith	Australia, Ireland	Wallabies, Ireland	NSWRL	Australia (RU), Ireland (RU)	1980s/1990s
Ricky Stuart	Australia	Australian U-21	NRL	Australia (RU & RL)	1980s/1990s
George Smith	New Zealand	All Blacks	All Golds	New Zealand (RU/RL)	1900s
Alan Tait	Scotland	Scotland /1997 Lions Tour	Rugby Football League Championship	Great Britain	1980/90s
Brad Thorn	New Zealand	All Blacks	Kangaroos	Australia (RL) New Zealand (RU)	1994–present
John Timu	New Zealand	All Blacks	NZ Kiwis	New Zealand (RU/RL)	1990s
Va'aiga "Inga" Tuigamala	New Zealand	All Blacks	Super League	New Zealand (RU) Western Samoa (RL)	1990s
Lesley Vainikolo	Tonga	England	Super League	England (RU) New Zealand (RL)	2000s
Dave Valentine	Scotland	Scotland	Super League	Scotland (RU), Great Britain, Empire XIII (RL)	1940s, 1950s
Rob Valentine	Scotland	Scotland	Super League	Scotland (RU) Great Britain, Other Nationalities (RL)	1960s, 1970s
Sonny Bill Williams	New Zealand	All Blacks	NZ Kiwis, NRL	New Zealand (RL/RU)	2004–present
Roy Kinnear	Scotland	Scotland, British and Irish Lions	Great Britain	Scotland, B&I Lions (RU) Great Britain, Other Nationalities (RL)	1920s, 1930s
Gareth Thomas	Wales	Wales, British and Irish Lions	Wales, Super League	Wales (RU/RL)	1994–2011
Tiaan Strauss	South Africa	South Africa, Australia	NRL with Cronulla Sharks	South Africa and Australia (RU)	1986–1999
Tom van Vollenhoven	South Africa	South Africa	Northern Rugby Football League with St. Helens	South Africa (RU)	1950s–1960s
Rob Louw	South Africa	South Africa	RFL with Wigan	South Africa (RU)	1978–1997
Ray Mordt	South Africa	South Africa	Rugby Football League Championship with Wigan	South Africa (RU)	1980–1987
Wilf Rosenberg	South Africa	South Africa	Rugby Football League Championship with Leeds and Hull F.C.	South Africa (RU)	1955–1963
David Watkins	Wales	Wales, British and Irish Lions	Rugby Football League Championship with Salford and Swinton	Wales/Great Britain (RL) Wales (RU)British and Irish Lions	1961–1980

== See also ==
- List of multi-sport athletes
- Comparison of American football and Canadian football
- Comparison of American football and rugby union
- Comparison of American football and rugby league
- Comparison of Canadian football and rugby union
- Comparison of Australian rules football and Gaelic football
- Comparison of Gaelic football and rugby union
- Comparison of rugby union and rugby league
- List of Australian rules footballers and cricketers
- List of cricket and rugby union players
- List of cricket and rugby league players
- International Player Pathway
