= Brisbane Football Club =

Brisbane Football Club may refer to:

- Brisbane Bears, a defunct Australian rules football club (1986-1996)
- Brisbane Broncos, a rugby league club that competes in the National Rugby League
- Brisbane Football Club (defunct), a defunct football club that played Victorian Association (now Australian football), rugby union and soccer
- Brisbane Lions, an Australian rules football club that competes in the Australian Football League (founded 1996)
- Brisbane Roar FC, an association football (soccer) club that competes in the A-League
