= Edward S. Cunningham =

Australian journalist (1859–1957)

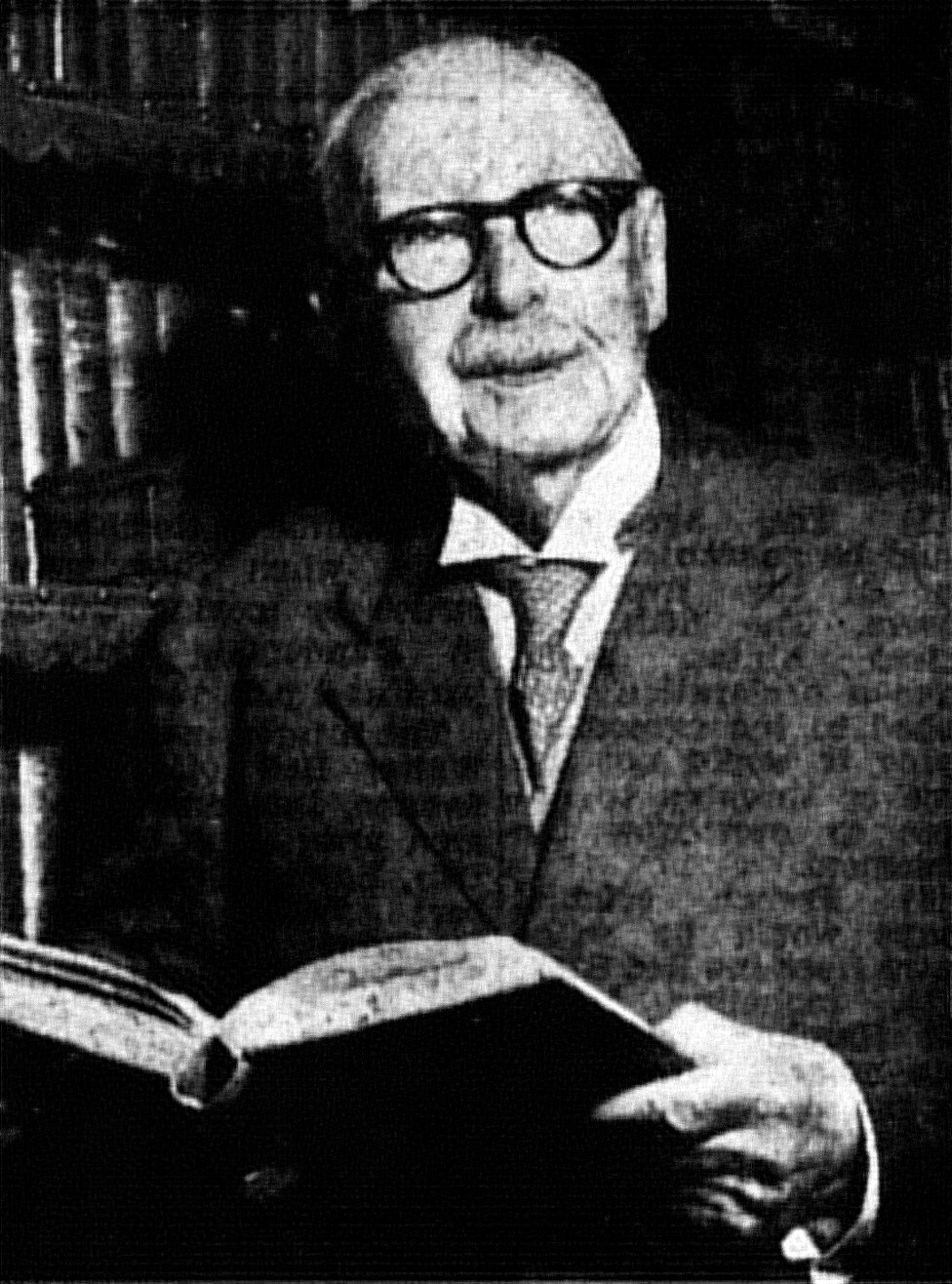
Sir Edward Sheldon Cunningham in 1954

Sir Edward Sheldon Cunningham (21 July 1859 – 28 April 1957) was the editor of the Melbourne Argus from 1906 to 1928.

== Biography ==
Cunningham was born at De Witt Street, Battery Point, Tasmania, the younger son of Benjamin Marriott Cunningham (c. 1830–1896) and his wife Jane Eccles Cunningham, née Neilson, who married in 1855. The family shortly moved to Newcastle, New South Wales, then settled in Bendigo, where, following a private school education supplemented by instruction from his intelligent and cultured mother, he began working as a copy boy for the Bendigo Advertiser. After three years he returned to Hobart, where he worked as proofreader for the Mercury until he had become proficient at shorthand, when he was taken on as a reporter.

He joined The Age as a political reporter in 1879. One of his earliest "scoops" was to witness the arrival of the wounded and recently captured Ned Kelly at the North Melbourne station when other reporters had assumed he would be taken to the Spencer Street headquarters. His reports of the trial of Kelly were models of lucid reporting. Shortly after, at the instigation of David Watterston, he joined The Argus as a parliamentary reporter.

He succeeded Watterston as editor of The Argus in 1906 and retired in December 1928, succeeding Watterston on the company's board of management.

He was knighted in 1936 and retired from The Argus board of management in 1938.

== Personal ==
Cunningham married Maud Mary Jackson (died 1931) at Sandhurst (now part of Bendigo) on 29 September 1886. They had no children.

== Recognition ==
- He was conferred with the honorary title of Doctor of Laws by the University of Glasgow in 1909, and until his knighthood was commonly referred to as "Dr Cunningham".
- His name appears on the Australian Media Hall of Fame.
