= The Argus (Melbourne) =

Former newspaper in Melbourne, Australia

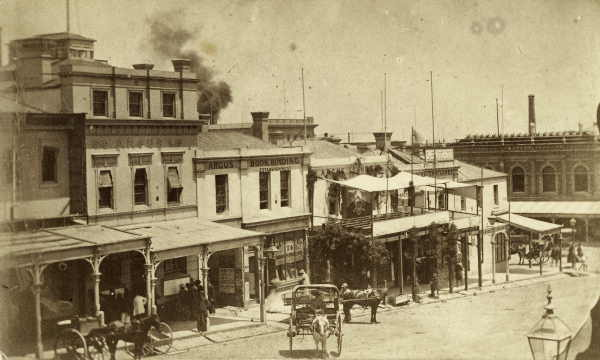
- The Argus office at 76 Collins Street, Melbourne in 1867
- Type: Daily newspaper
- Format: Broadsheet, then tabloid from 1942
- Founder: William Kerr
- Founded: 1846
- Ceased publication: January 19, 1957
- ISSN: 1833-9719
- OCLC number: 440707753
- Free online archives: https://trove.nla.gov.au/newspaper/title/13

The Argus was an Australian daily morning newspaper in Melbourne from 2 June 1846 to 19 January 1957, and was considered to be the general Australian newspaper of record for this period. Widely known as a conservative newspaper for most of its history, it adopted a left-leaning approach from 1949. The Argus's main competitor was David Syme's more liberal-minded newspaper, The Age.

== History ==
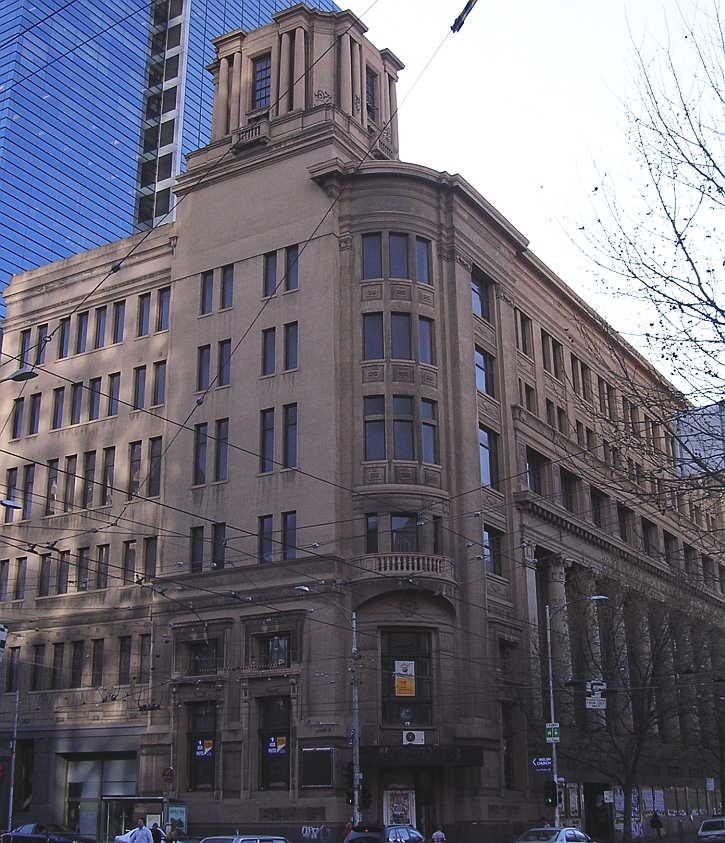
The Argus Building, opened in 1926 on La Trobe Street to the design of Godfrey & Spowers

The newspaper was originally owned by William Kerr, who was also Melbourne's town clerk from 1851 to 1856 and had been a journalist at the Sydney Gazette before moving to Melbourne in 1839 to work on John Fawkner's newspaper, the Port Phillip Patriot.

The first edition was published on 2 June 1846. The paper soon became known for its scurrilous abuse and sarcasm, and by 1853, after he had lost a series of libel lawsuits, Kerr was forced to sell the paper's ownership to avoid financial ruin. The paper was then published by Edward Wilson. By 1855, it had a daily circulation of 13,000.

Lauchlan Mackinnon was a pastoralist, politician and newspaper proprietor. Mackinnon one of the most enterprising of the pioneer colonists in Victoria and one of the proprietors of The Argus from 1852 until his death in 1888.

In October 1881, an afternoon edition was launched, the Evening Mail, edited by Henry Short, but this was a failure, and ceased publication in August 1882. In 1883, newspaper editor and owner Richard Twopeny (1857–1919) regarded The Argus as "the best daily paper published out of England". The paper become a stablemate to the weekly The Australasian, which became the Australasian Post in 1946.

During the Depression, in 1933, it launched the Melbourne Evening Star in competition with The Herald newspaper of the Herald & Weekly Times, but ended the venture in 1936 due to poor circulation figures.

Final issue of The Argus

The company's newspaper operations experienced severe financial losses from 1939 onwards, which would continue through the 1940s and the 1950s due to economic turmoil, increased costs of newsprint, and cut-throat competition for newspaper circulation in Melbourne.

In June 1949, The Argus was acquired by the London based Daily Mirror newspaper group and, on 28 July 1952, it became the first newspaper in the world to publish colour photographs in a daily paper. The paper also had interests in radio and, from 1956, the new medium of television, being part of the consortium General Telecasters Victoria (GTV) and its television station GTV-9 (now part of the Nine Network).

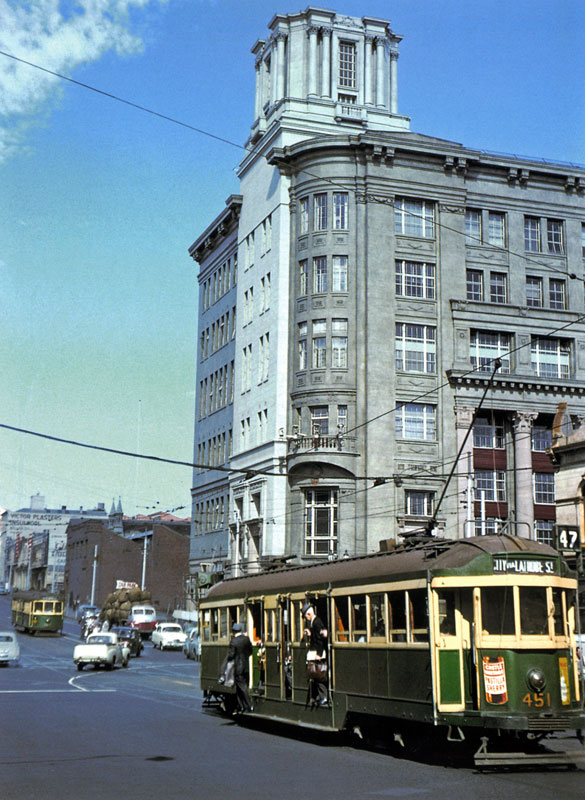
Argus building and Melbourne tram

On 19 January 1957, after 110 years, seven months and 17 days, the final edition of The Argus was published. The paper was discontinued and sold to the Herald and Weekly Times group (HWT), which undertook to re-employ Argus staff and continue publication of selected features, and also made an allocation of shares to the UK owners. The company's other print and broadcasting operations were unaffected.

== The Argus masthead banner ==
The Argus newspaper masthead included the words : I am in the place where I am demanded of conscience to speak the truth, and therefore the truth I speak, impugn it whoso list. These same words were also embossed in large letters on the tiles on the back wall of the entrance foyer of the Argus Latrobe St building. The words remain on the building wall, but today are covered in plaster. This expression was first used by John Knox, founder of the Reformed Church of Scotland (1513-1572) in discussions with Mary Queen of Scots.

== Notable editors and writers ==
- Julian Howard Ashton (1877–1964), English-born journalist, writer and critic
- Hugh Buggy (1896–1974), journalist/football writer
- Edward S. Cunningham (1859–1957), editor 1906–1928
- Roy Curthoys (1892–1971), editor 1929–1935
- Frances Fitzgerald Elmes (1867–1919), English-born feminist journalist
- Frederick William Haddon, (1839–1906), English-Australian sub-editor in 1863, editor 1867–1898
- Andrew Murray, editor in 1855 and 1856
- Charles Patrick Smith (1877–1963), journalist
- Betty Olive Osborn (1934-2020), former cadet and 'girl reporter'.
- Edward Oxford (1822–1900), writer and attempted assassin of Queen Victoria.
- James Smith
- David Watterston
- Howard Willoughby
- Edward Wilson
- Theodosia Ada Wallace, starting about 1892 she wrote a social column under the name 'Biddy B.A.'
- Arnold Shore, art critic
- Frank Doherty, theatre critic
- George Johnston, Australian journalist, war correspondent and novelist, best known for My Brother Jack.
- Charmian Clift (30 August 1923 – 8 July 1969), Australian journalist and writer. Literary collaborator of husband George Johnston.

== See also ==
- List of newspapers in Australia
- Argus Building
- Argus finals system, a series of systems for determining the premiers of the Victorian Football League and other Australian rules football competitions in the early 20th century
- Australasian Sketcher with Pen and Pencil
