= Theodosia Ada Wallace =

Australian journalist (1872–1953)

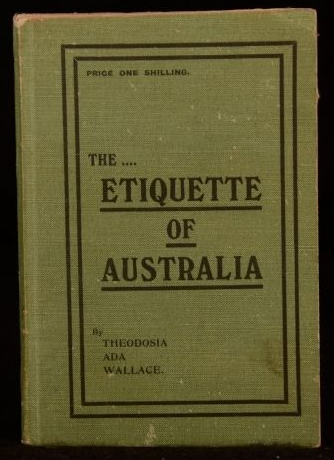
The Etiquette of Australia by Theodosia Ada Wallace

Theodosia Ada Wallace (18 August 1872 – 1 October 1953) was an Australian journalist.

== Life ==
The daughter of Alexander Britton and Ada Willoughby, both natives of England, she was born Theodosia Ada Britton in Jolimont, East Melbourne. The family moved to Sydney around 1885. She was educated at home by private tutor and then studied at the University of Sydney.

She taught school briefly and then began writing a social column as "Biddy B.A." for The Argus and Australasian Post in Melbourne. She also wrote for The Sydney Morning Herald, later becoming a member of its staff. The Herald added a weekly "Page for Women" in 1905 and she became editor for the page. That same year, she married Albert Edward Noble Wallace who was a chess expert and an accountant. He had been the Australian chess champion three times in the 1890s. She left the Herald prior to the birth of her first child in 1907.

In 1909, she published The Etiquette of Australia: A Handy Book of the Common Usages of Everyday Life and Society. She later returned to journalism, writing for various newspapers. Wallace wrote a weekly column "An Idle Woman's Diary" under the name "INO" for The Newcastle Herald, Wallace was the first head of the press clipping service for the Country Press Association. She helped found the Society of Women Writers and served as its vice-president.

She wrote a poem My love for you that was set to music during the 1920s by Lillian Mitchell.

Wallace died at home at the age of 81.
