= David Watterston =

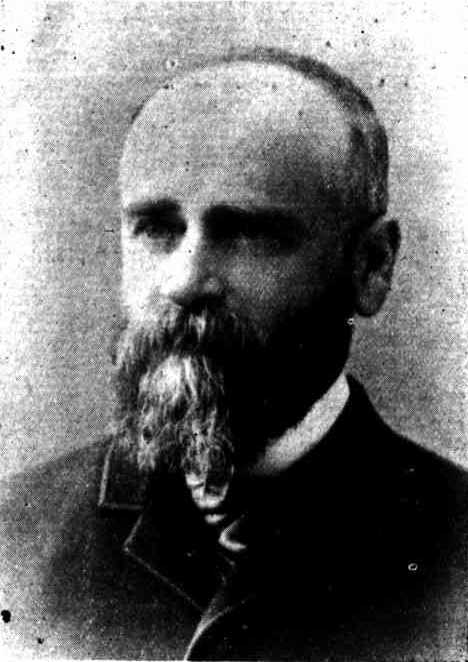
David Watterston Editor of the Australasian in 1898

David Watterston (2 January 1845 – 23 July 1931) was a Scottish born Australian journalist and newspaper editor; he was editor of The Australasian from 1885 to 1903 and of The Argus 1903 to 1906.

== Early life ==
Watterston was born on 2 January 1845 in Balgone Barns, Haddingtonshire, Scotland, youngest son of James Watterston and his wife Catherine née Broadwood. The family, after spending a year in Gottland, in the Baltic Sea, went to Australia, arriving in April 1853.

== Legal and Journalistic Career ==
After acting as clerk in an attorney's office in Melbourne, Watterston moved to Ipswich, Queensland in May 1860. In October 1860 Watterston commenced his connection with the press. He learned reporting on the Ipswich Herald (afterwards the Queensland Times) and then moved to Brisbane in 1865, to undertake parliamentary reporting. Watterston spent several years in the gallery for The Brisbane Courier and next on the Guardian, from which paper, in June 1869, he obtained promotion to the parliamentary staff of The Argus, Melbourne, returning to Victoria after nine years' absence.

Watterston executed various special commissions for The Argus, being sent to the United States in 1876, for six months, in connection with the Philadelphia Exhibition. He went to England in 1879, to report on the movements of the Berry-Pearson embassy. Watterston was appointed chief of The Argus reporting staff in 1881, and four years later, on the editorship of the Australasian becoming vacant, he had that position given to him, the Australasian being a weekly literary, sporting and agricultural journal, started by the proprietors of The Argus in 1864. Watterston was editor of the Argus from 1903 to 1906. His successor was Edward S. Cunningham.

== Cricket and Australian rules football ==
Watterston was a member of Queensland cricket associations, he was a member of the Victorians Cricket Club and committee that called for cricket to make way for football in the off-season. Watterston is believed to have begun playing Australian rules at school in Melbourne and he founded the Brisbane Football Club (Queensland's first) in Brisbane in 1866.

== Death and legacy ==
Watterston died in Armadale, Victoria, Australia on 23 July 1931; he was unmarried.

Gazetted with incorrect spelling, Watterson Place, in the Canberra suburb of Gilmore, is, however, named in his honour.
