= George Henry Pritchard =

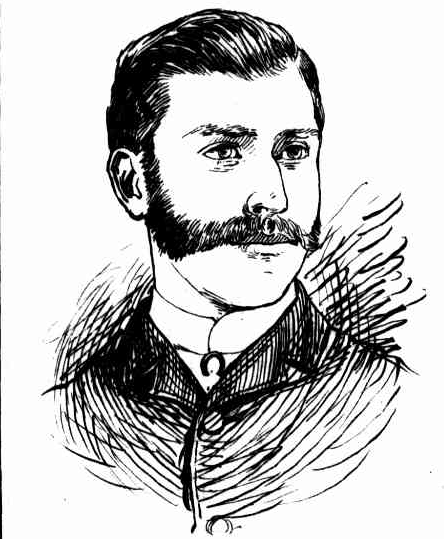
- George Hentry Pritchard illustrated from Figaros Athletic Gallery during his rugby playing days in 1887

Personal information
- Born: 10 February 1861; Albury, New South Wales
- Died: 5 July 1930
- Original team: Brisbane FC

George Henry Pritchard (10 February 1861 – 7 July 1930) was a dual code footballer, who captained Queensland in Australian rules football and rugby union, one of just seven players to represent the Queensland in both codes. Pritchard served as captain for both Queensland and the Brisbane Football Club.

== Early life ==
Pritchard was born in Albury, New South Wales moving with his parents to Brisbane age of 3 where his father became a trustee at Brisbane Grammar School the school at which George would attend.

== Sport ==
Known by the name of Harry, Pritchard joined the Brisbane Football Club in 1876, becoming the club's captain in 1881. He was consistently named the most prodigious kick in the colony. He represented Queensland in New South Wales in 1884, captaining the side. He also served as the club's vice-president. He announced his shock retirement from the game switching to rugby and joining the rugby team being announced as captain of the 1884 tour to New South Wales. His defection to rugby was one of the turning points for the popularity of the code in the colony.

== Outside of sport ==
Outside of football Pritchard was prominent in the sugar industry, moving to Townsville, and was active in politics where he was president of the National Political Council and served in the army for 9 years.

He died at Bowen Terrace, Brisbane in 1930.
