= Women's Uni 7s Series =

- Sport: Rugby 7s
- First season: 2017
- Country: Australia
- Most recent champion: Bond University (2022)
- Most titles: Bond University; University of Queensland; (2 titles each)

The Women's Uni 7s Series is the peak domestic competition for women's rugby sevens in Australia. The series is run by UniSport and Rugby Australia. It is contested by university teams and half of each team's playing squad must be student-athletes. Members of the national women's squad are also allocated to each team. The series was sponsored by Aon from 2017 to 2019.

== Champions ==
Year	Champion	Pts	Second	Pts	Third	Pts	Teams	Refs
2017	University of Queensland	80	Bond University	68	Macquarie University		8	
2018	Griffith University	94	University of Queensland	86	Macquarie University		10	
2019	University of Queensland	76	Griffith University	68	University of Sydney		10	
Season canceled in 2020 due to the COVID-19 outbreak
2021	Bond University		University of Melbourne		University of Sydney		9	
2022	Bond University	58	University of Technology Sydney	48	University of Newcastle	44	7	

== All-time summary ==
As of the 2022 Uni 7s Series.

#	University	First	Second	Third	Total
1	Bond University	2	1	0	3
1	University of Queensland	2	1	0	3
3	Griffith University	1	1	0	2
4	University of Melbourne	0	1	0	1
4	University of Technology Sydney	0	1	0	1
6	Macquarie University	0	0	2	2
6	University of Sydney	0	0	2	2
8	University of Newcastle	0	0	1	1
Totals (8 entries)		5	5	5	15
