= Ray Smith (Australian footballer) =

Personal information
- Full name: Raymond Kehm Smith
- Born: 23 September 1948 (age 78)
- Original team: Western Districts
- Height: 183 cm (6 ft 0 in)
- Weight: 81 kg (179 lb)

Playing career^{1}
Years	Club	Games (Goals)
1971–1975	Essendon	77 (1)
1975–1976	Melbourne	27 (1)
Total		104 (2)
- ^{1} Playing statistics correct to the end of 1976.

Raymond Kehm "Ray" Smith (born 23 September 1948) is a former Australian rules footballer who played with Essendon and Melbourne in the Victorian Football League (VFL) during the 1970s. He also played professional rugby league for Fortitude Valley in 1970 and was a part of their premiership-winning team.

== Junior football ==
Smith began playing junior Australian rules football for Sherwood until the age of 14. He then commenced playing senior football for the Western Districts in the QANFL as a 15-year-old while also playing schoolboys rugby union for Brisbane Grammar School in the position of centre. He continued to play both sports throughout his schooling and earned representative honours for the under-19 Queensland rugby union team as well as the Queensland Australian rules football state team.

Australian National Football Council rules at the time stated that New South Wales and Queensland were considered developmental states and would not allow players to switch into the VFL in fear of diminishing the local talent pool. Smith instead decided to sign for the Fortitude Valley Diehards professional rugby league team in the Brisbane Rugby League after impressing in a touch football game.

== Rugby league career ==
In 1970, Smith began playing rugby league for the Fortitude Valley Diehards in the Brisbane Rugby League. He played the position of centre for the Diehards and was chosen to represent Brisbane in the 1970 Bulimba Cup. He was a part of the Fortitude Valley side that defeated the Northern Suburbs 13–11 in extra time to claim the 1970 BRL premiership. Smith also finished equal first in the 1970 Brisbane Player of the Year award but lost the award on countback. He was seen as a good chance to be chosen for the Australian national rugby league team in 1971 but sent shock waves through rugby league circles when it was announced that he had signed to play for VFL club Essendon in the 1971 season.

== VFL career ==
He moved to Victoria in 1971 and joined Essendon, with whom he would spend five seasons. A half back flanker, Smith played 91 consecutive games in the period from 1972 to 1976. After playing in the first twelve rounds of the 1975 VFL season for Essendon, he would switch clubs during the week and play the remaining ten rounds at Melbourne. In 1976, when Melbourne defeated Footscray at Western Oval, Smith became the first footballer from Queensland to play 100 VFL games.

Smith finished his career in the Victorian Football Association, where he captain-coached Camberwell in 1977 and 1978. He then played with Brunswick for the season and was a member of their 1980 premiership team.
