= Brisbane Football Club (1866–1887) =

Australian rules football club

Brisbane

Names
- Full name: Brisbane Football Club
- Nickname(s): Invincible Reds, The Brisbanes, The Reds, Metropolitans

Club details
- Founded: 1866; 160 years ago
- Dissolved: c. 1887; 139 years ago
- Colours: red and black
- Competition: Queensland Football Association (1880–1887)
- Ground: Queen's Park, Australia

The Brisbane Football Club is a defunct football club, formed in May 1866 in the colonial capital of Brisbane. Brisbane FC was the first known football club of any code in the Colony of Queensland. It was the first club outside Victoria to adopt what was then known as the 'Victorian rules' football (now known as Australian rules football) from 1866. It is also the first recorded club to have played multiple football codes in Queensland, including soccer (1867–1875) and rugby (1876–1879).

Between 1870 and 1877 it also served as the governing body for football in the colony. Even after it deferred the laws of the game to the Victorian Football Association in 1877 the club continued to have a strong influence on both Australian rules and rugby until the newly formed Queensland Football Association in 1880 officially conferred governance to the Victorian Association.

Following experimentation with other football codes, it re-committed to Australian rules (with occasional rugby matches) from 1879 after which it dominated in the sport. Playing in red and black hoops, in 1883 it earned the title the Invincible Reds. It had an intense rivalry with the Ipswich Football Club. In 1885, the club's junior feeder school Brisbane Grammar switched to rugby and as a result, from 1886 Brisbane FC began to uphold a strong preference for that code, fielding its best players in its rugby side and playing only its seconds in the QFA. Due in part to its lack of playing depth this tipped dominance in favour of Ipswich and the club was regularly defeated by large margins. The Invincible tagline was widely mocked during its final years and its Victorian rules side was known simply as The Reds.

Reputational damage due to its defections to rugby on its identity and damaging losses in both codes ultimately led to its demise in 1887. The club was to last around only 20 years, and its allegiance to rugby signalled the end of Australian rules popularity in Queensland.

== History ==
=== Mid-1800s: first football games in Brisbane ===
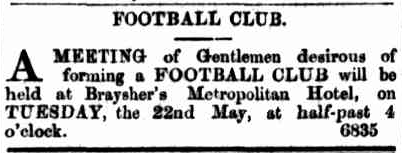
Front page advertisement for Football Club meeting from the Brisbane Courier 21 May 1866

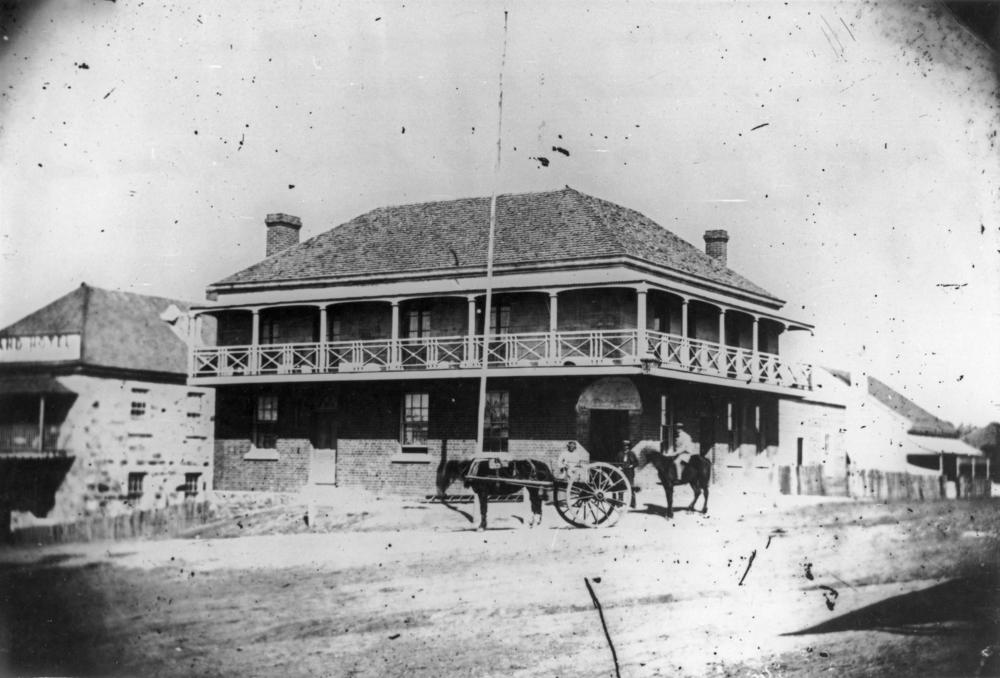
Metropolitan Hotel Edward Street, Brisbane ca 1864

Football has been played in Brisbane from very early times, as evidenced by this notice in The Moreton Bay Courier in 1849 (a mere 25 years after the arrival of the first white settlers in the Brisbane region, at which time the population was around 2000 people, many of whom were former convicts and poor Irish immigrants):

ANNIVERSARY.
TO the SPORTING BLADES of BRISBANE.
BEING determined that the Anniversary [now called Australia Day] shall not pass over without a little fun, in addition to the usual English Sports, the Lads of Kangaroo Point
CHALLENGE
all comers to a Game of Foot Ball – preliminaries to be settled at the Commercial Inn, Kangaroo Point, on the evening of the 24th.

Given the inchoate nature of the various types of football at that time, they may have been playing simple mob football. Alternatively, they could have been playing in accordance with the recently published Rugby school rules (1845) or the Cambridge Rules (1848), the latter being the forerunner of association football rules. The game that was to become Australian rules football was not to be codified for another 10 years.

=== 1866: club formed ===
The Brisbane Football Club was formed at a meeting on 22 May 1866: the Brisbane Courier reported that "A meeting of gentlemen favorable to the formation of a Football Club in Brisbane was held on Tuesday, at Braysher's Metropolitan Hotel [formerly in Edward Street near Mary Street] ... a committee was appointed to prepare a code of rules ... The prospects of the club must be certainly very encouraging to the promoters, as already more than twenty gentlemen have joined, and a large number of others have signified their wish to do so."

At a subsequent meeting on 31 May "About 20 members were present; and the first business transacted was the election of twelve new members ... The annual subscription was fixed at 5s ... The uniform chosen was a scarlet shirt, with a distinguishing color for the captain ... A resolution was passed authorising the printing of the rules, as well as the laws of football passed at a meeting of delegates of clubs held in Melbourne on the 8th ult., which latter, it was decided, should be the laws recognised by the Brisbane Club."

Original club members included: S. Hart, W. G. Macnish, W. H. Ryder, Charles Edward Wallen, G. Cowlishaw, and Tom Board.

=== Choice of Rules ===
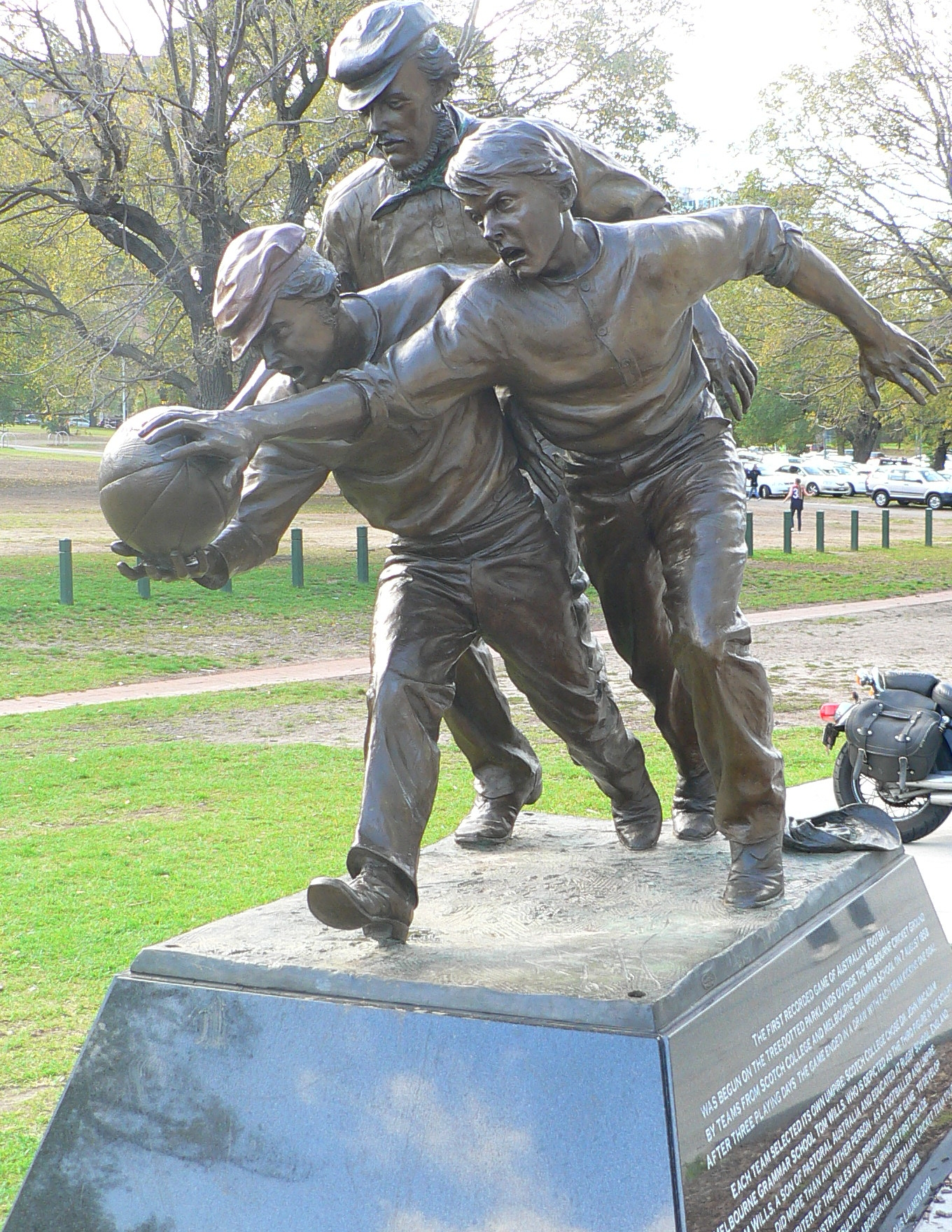
Statue depicting the first recorded match of Australian Rules Football between Scotch College and Melbourne Grammar in 1858 umpired by Tom Wills. Brisbane FC founder Charles Edward Wallen played for Scotch in this match.

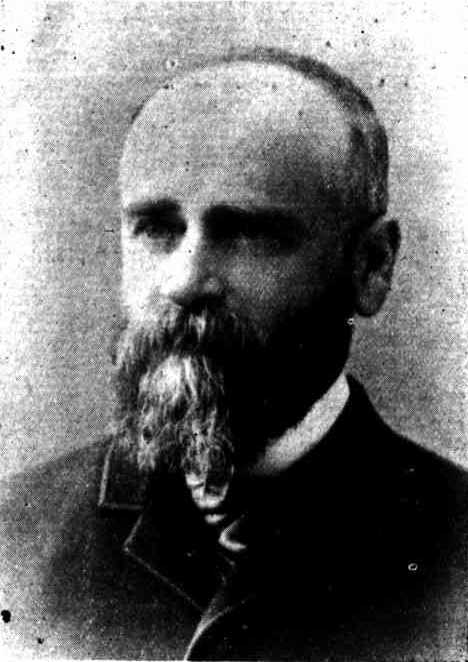
David Watterston founder of the club took up Australian football during its boom in Melbourne and was instrumental in promoting the code in Queensland before his return in 1869.

It is not recorded why the club chose to adopt the contemporary Melbourne, rather than the Sydney, version of football. However Victorian football was far more popular and widespread than Sydney's of the time. There was regular competition with more than 14 clubs across Victoria and several schools playing it, whereas Sydney had just one club playing under Rugby School rules (and Rugby union was not formally codified until 1871). Several factors may have influenced the decision to adopt the Melbourne rules but it is significant that several of founding committee members were either Victorians, Victorian footballers and/or cricketers and some were involved in the early years of the code in Victoria. The timing of the Melbourne committee's redrafting of the laws was coincidentally drafted on 8th May which gave significant impetus for clubs across Australia to follow suit.

One of the members of Brisbane's rules committee, Charles Edward Wallen, was schooled at Scotch College in Melbourne, and played in experimental rules matches umpired by Melbourne Football Club founder Tom Wills in 1858. Tom Board and George Clencross-Smith were also both teammates of Wills at Geelong Football Club. Founding chair David Watterston was schooled in Melbourne after arriving in Australia from Scotland in 1853 before moving to Ipswich in 1860 working as editor of the Ipswich Herald then joining the Brisbane Courier in 1865. Watterson was a member of Brisbane's Victorian Cricket Club (formed 1863 and consisting of ex-Victorian players). The Victorian Club had on 26 May proposed that cricket ground make way off-season for football. Board, Ryder, Cowlishaw and Macnish were also all playing members of Victorians Club. Significantly, on 1 June 1866, the Brisbane Courier published the Melbourne Football Club rules as the official rules for the Queensland colony.

=== First games ===
The club had its first game on Saturday 9 June 1866, as reported in the Brisbane Courier a week later:

About thirty members of the Brisbane Foot-ball Club mustered in the Queen's Park [now part of the City Botanic Gardens – see image below] on Saturday afternoon, and played a scratch match. This was the first general turn out of the new club.

The club also played matches on the 'cricket ground', located in the area then known as 'Green Hills' (beside Countess Street Petrie Terrace opposite the Victoria Barracks – now occupied by the Northern Busway), where cricket matches were also played since at least the early 1860s.

The Brisbane Courier reported in July 1866:

THE members of the Brisbane Football Club had a turn out on Saturday afternoon, and played several games. The place of meeting was the cricket ground. Though the muster was not large, the play was conducted in a spirited manner; and there were many good struggles before a goal was kicked. The ground was slippery in many places, and, as a matter of course, several "spills" occurred. There will be a practice at the Queen's Park this afternoon, the cricket ground being rather too far from the centre of the city.

The club initially played intra-club matches, with teams selected arbitrarily. A second club was proposed, and shortly later Civil Service appeared, formed possibly after 19 July to facilitate scratch matches between the two clubs.

A newspaper report listed the players for a 'Civil Service' team (Messrs. Boyce, French, J. Bourne, Scarr, Perse, Hill, T. B. Watterston, Mills, Coley, Stewart, Bunton, Gill, Burrowes, Ryder, King, Pugh, Darvall, Costello, Pounden, Somerset, Bourne, Kellett, and Miles) to play the 'All Comers' team (Messrs. Munce, Cowlishaw, Garbut, Horsley, Sheridan, Board, Faunce, Highfield, Watterston, Sheehan, Hart, Tregurtha, Zillman, G. Smith, E. Webb, H. Webb, Fowles, Kelly, Macquarie, Cotham, Millar, Miskin, and Everest).

The Brisbane Courier further reported in late 1866: "ON the football ground [Queen's Park], on Saturday afternoon, there was no match; but two sides were chosen, and a very lively game was played ...Five goals were kicked ... The football season will end in a few weeks and the committee of the club contemplate getting up some athletic sports as an appropriate finale."

In 1867, the club was already experimenting with multiple codes, including, by all appearances matches in the 11 man British Association rules against the Volunteer Artillery club which included players from around the world.

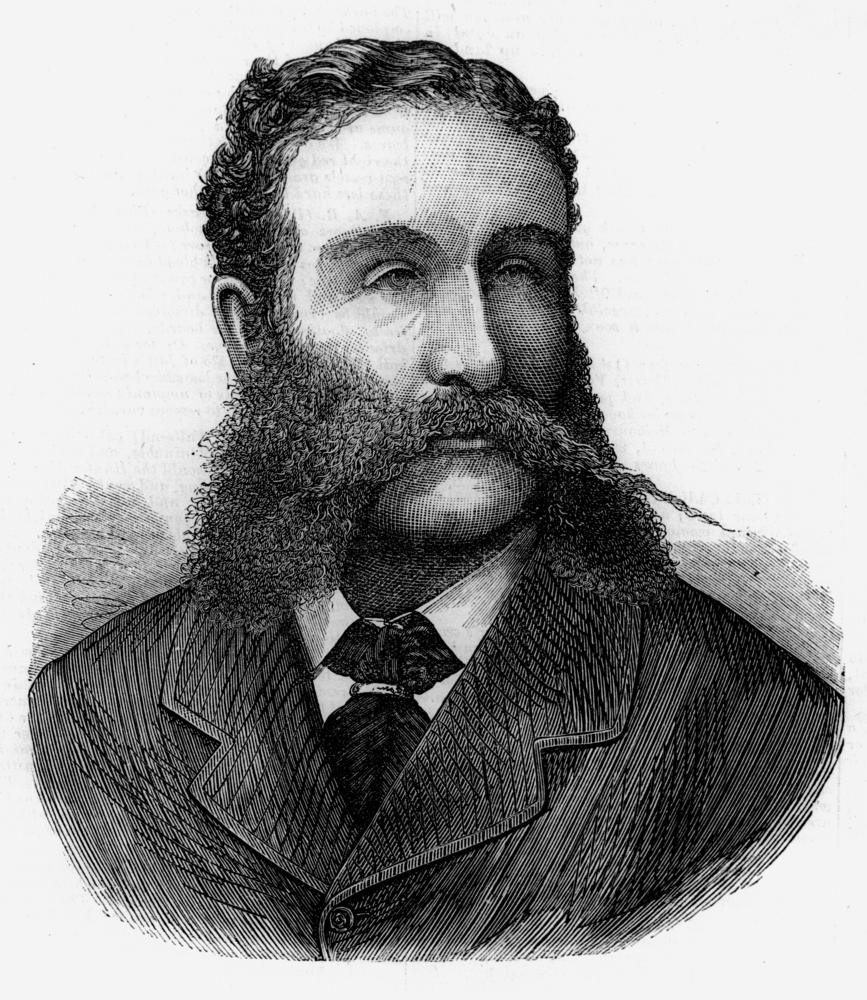
Sir Joshua Peter Bell, first elected president of the Brisbane FC in 1868

By early 1868, it appears the club was struggling somewhat – at its second annual meeting, Chairman Watterston reported that "Your committee ... though not able, in speaking of the operations of the past season, to refer to them as a perfect success ... can yet congratulate the members upon the satisfactory manner in which the game was carried on during the greater part of the season ... The number of paying members on the list at the beginning of last season was 68, and 15 new members joined the club in 1867. The total number, however, was reduced by 31 who resigned or left the city, and by 7 who were struck off in consequence of their subscriptions being unpaid. The total number of paid members to begin the present season with is 45."

It was also noted that "Your committee have still to regret the absence of a rival club ... Perhaps, considering the number of names on the books last year, the formation of a second club would rather retard than advance the game in Brisbane just now."

However, it appears the 1868 season was more successful – at the annual general meeting held at Lenneberg's Café, Queen Street, on 28 May 1869, chairman Watterston reported "Your committee ... feel that they have cause to congratulate the members on the continued interest manifested in the game during the past season, as will be seen from the large attendance at all the practices ... Three first-class matches have, however, been played – two with the Police ... and the other by the club, and one with the 50th Regiment (Queen's Own), in which the club proved victorious."

The club competed against four ad hoc teams in the Brisbane area between 1868 and 1869, including Volunteer Artillery, the newly formed Brisbane Grammar School (then located on land which is now the Roma Street railway station) a Civil Service team and a police team, playing eight games in its inaugural 'inter-club' season.

=== 1870s: Opposition clubs formed ===
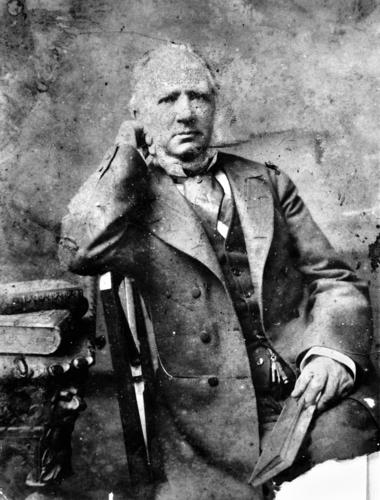
Prominent Irish-Australian politician Dr Kevin O'Doherty, served as president of the Brisbane Football Club from 1870 until his return to Ireland in 1885

Dr Kevin O'Doherty became president of the club in 1870. He would continue his presidency until returning to Ireland in 1885, a couple of years before the club folded.

By 1870, the Ipswich Football Club had formed and became the only other organised club in the region and hence the Brisbane club's only competition. Brisbane won the first three games of that season.

By 1871 the club was acting as the governing body for the code in the colony, convening a committee of clubs to govern the rules of the game locally.

=== First Soccer match in Queensland (1875) ===
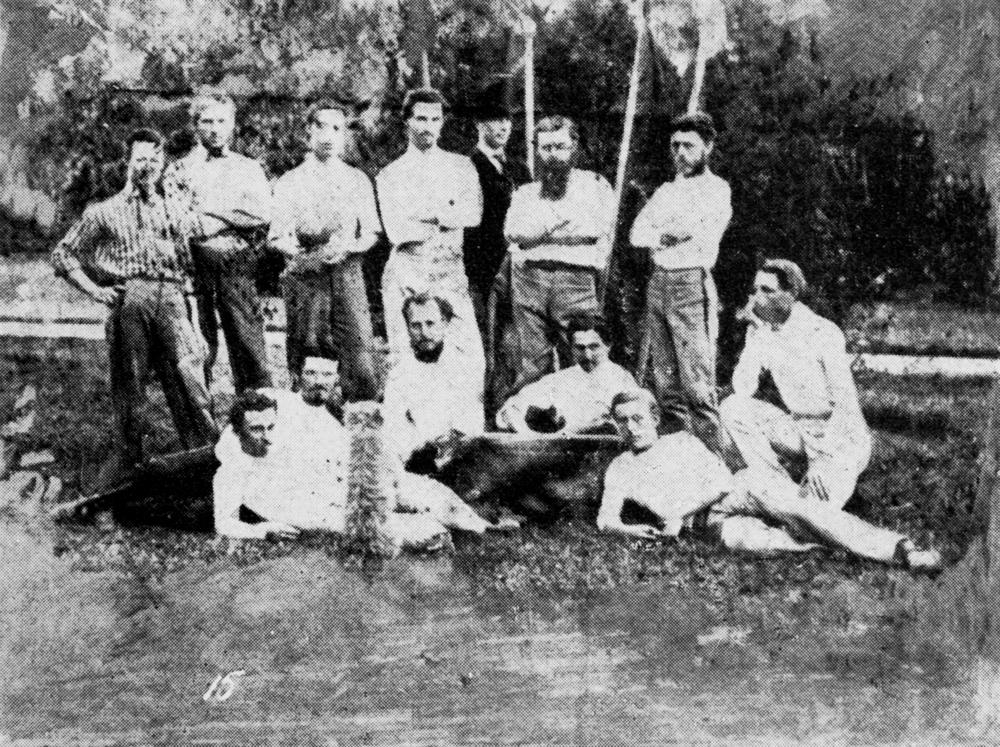
Brisbane team ca 1870 playing London Association (soccer) rules (Note: This image, from the John Oxley Library at the State Library of Queensland, if correctly dated, is more likely a photograph of a Brisbane 'Melbourne rules' team and possibly the Rangers FC, rather than Brisbane FC, which played in scarlet, as noted above (Melbourne rules was played with a near-spherical ball at that time). Alternatively, given the number of players in the photograph, it may be an association football team from a later date.)

The club played at least one game of what was then referred to as "London Association rules" (now 'soccer'): The Queenslander of 14 August 1875 reported that on Saturday 7 August 1875, Brisbane FC played a game against the inmates and warders of the Woogaroo Lunatic Asylum: "… play commenced at half-past 2 ... One rule provided that the ball should not be handled nor carried." Moreover, the Victorian publication The Footballer reported in 1875 in its section on "Football in Queensland" that the "match was played without handling the ball under any circumstances whatever (Association rules)." This is the earliest known game of 'soccer' played in the Brisbane region (and possibly in Australia).

=== First rugby matches (1876–1879) ===
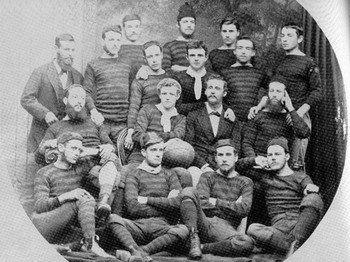
Brisbane FC ca 1879. In this year the club reverted from rugby union rules to Australian rules

In 1876, two new Brisbane clubs (Rangers FC and Bonnet Rouge FC) were formed, both adopting rugby union laws. The Brisbane Courier of 10 May 1876 reported: "At a meeting of the newly-formed football club at Petrie-terrace, held yesterday evening, it was decided to call the club the "Bonnet Rouge Football Club;" the uniform to be a red cap, of any shape whatever.

Brisbane FC sent a letter to the Victorian Association Melbourne announcing the club's intention to formally adopt the rugby union rules over the Victorian rules for convenience playing against majority of its local opposition clubs. The three clubs commenced playing according to rugby union rules, but modified by local customary rules.

Both Bonnet Rouge and Rangers clubs folded by the end of the 1878 season. However, the Excelsior club was formed in 1877 and the Wallaroos in 1880, with both clubs apparently playing according to 'Victorian rules'.

In 1879 the Brisbane Courier reported that the Brisbane FC had reverted to what had become known as the 'Victorian rules', "in place of the Rugby Union Rules played by the club during the last three seasons".

=== 1880s: Queensland Football Association ===
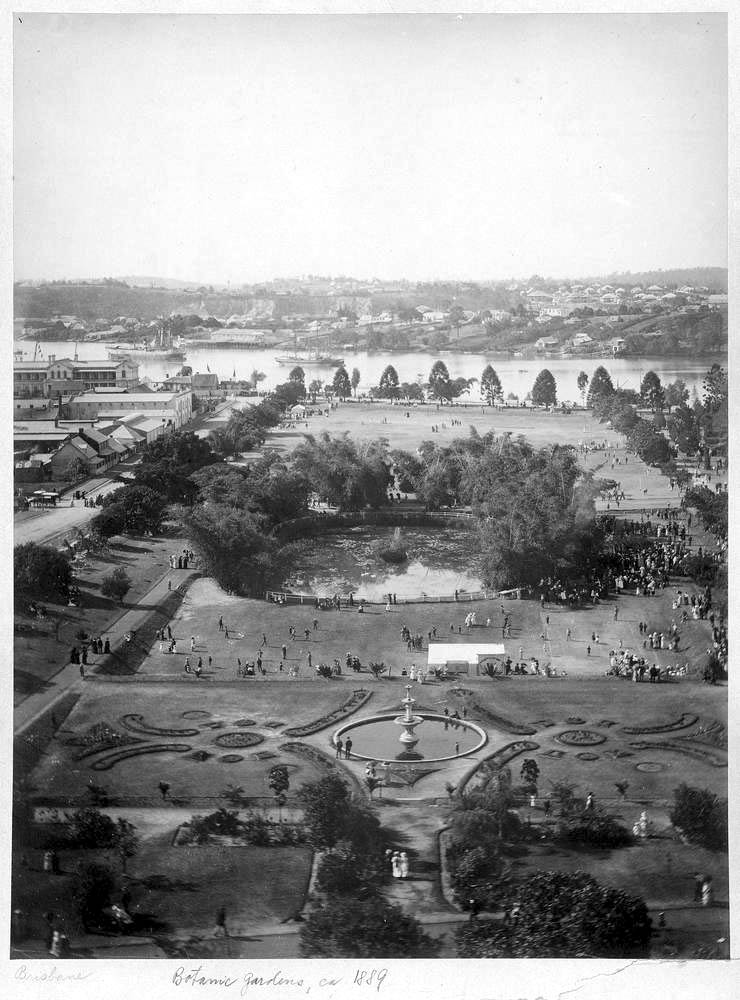
Queen's Park in the 1880s – playing field at far end

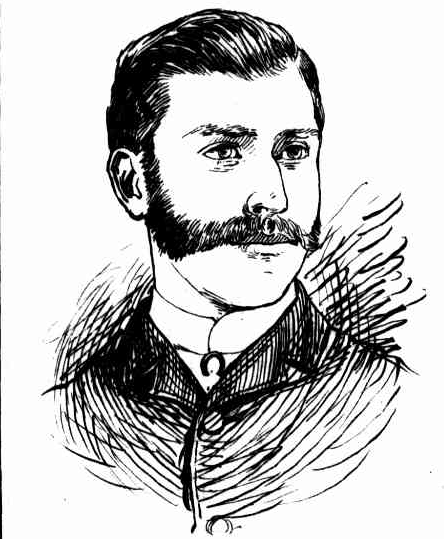
Harry Pritchard, former club and Queensland captain switched codes in 1884 and captained Queensland in rugby

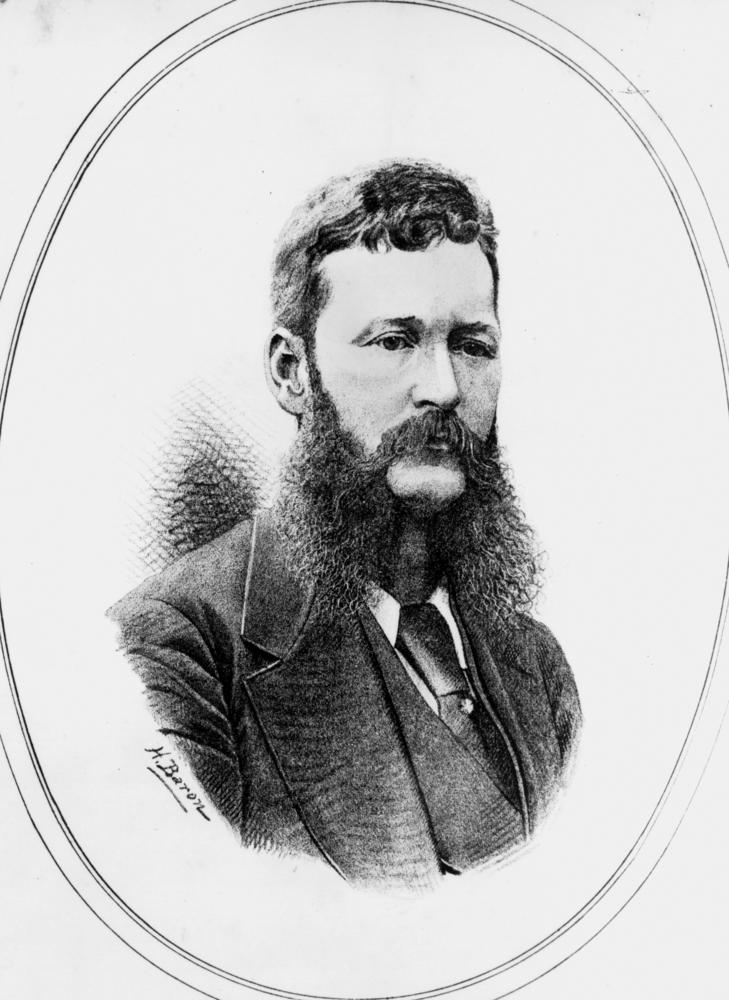
Boyd Dunlop Morehead was the club's final president serving from 1886 to 1887

At a meeting of the clubs on 30 April 1880 for the purpose of forming the Queensland Football Association (QFA) to affiliate with the Victorian Football Association, the club's representative E.C. Binge was the only club opposed to the association, believing that it had the right to govern itself, his motion lapsed and the formation proceeded.

It had joined along with Wallaroo, Excelsiors and Athenians (Ipswich). The new association decided to recognise and play both Victorian and rugby rules.

However, in 1882, a Brisbane FC representative (Pring Roberts) arranged a rugby match against the Sydney Wallaroos Rugby Club, after the NSWRU (rugby union) offered to pay all costs associated with the match. Brisbane advocates of the Victorian rules game reacted angrily and declared that no QFA player would be permitted to play under rugby rules (which subsequently led to the formation of the Northern Rugby Union (now the Queensland Rugby Union) in 1884).

At the Brisbane club's annual general meeting in 1882, the club secretary, Thomas Welsby, reminded members that, according to their constitution, the club should only play Victorian rules and urged them to decide whether to adhere to this rule or introduce the rugby rules. The club ultimately decided to follow the Australian game.

In 1883 the club changed its colours, playing in red and black hoops, and immediately dominated the competition, earning the title the Invincible Reds.

Boyd Dunlop Morehead was elected president for 1886, at the time he was also serving as leader of the opposition in Queensland Legislative Assembly. A newspaper report in late 1886 describes Brisbane FC as "the premier club".

From this time Brisbane FC once again asserted its preference for rugby seeking to make a statement to the league it chose to field its best players in its rugby side and the rest in Victorian Association matches. This preference ultimately led to its demise as a club due to effect on its reputation of damaging losses in both codes.

==== 1887 QFA season ====
According to the Brisbane Courier of 15 March 1887, Brisbane FC it was reported it competed in the "Combined Football Sports" against Rovers, Excelsiors, Fireflies, Wallaroos, South Brisbanes, Wanderers, Ipswich, Sandgate and Wasps (Fireflies and Wanderers clubs were foundation members of the Northern Rugby Union in 1884). Curiously, it appears that none of the several soccer clubs in the region was invited (unless 'Rovers' refers to the Bundamba Rovers).

On 15 May 1887, the "Invincibles" suffered a humiliating defeat 5 to 1 at the hands of Ipswich, observers noted that their entire senior team was missing from the roster, they had played their seconds team. However they atoned against Rovers in May 6 goals 10 to a solitary behind. They then travelled to Toowoomba to play against the new football club there. Again, they suffered a humiliating defeat 1 goals 7 against Ipswich 5 goals 8. Ipswich media again challenged the Reds' claim to the invincible title, however also questioned their players switching to play with other clubs. The Reds defeated Excelsiors 4 goals 19 to 2 goals 2. In June they were again thrashed by Ipswich 4 goals 11 to 6 behinds in front of a crowd of 650 at North Ipswich. Reds captain Greenwood represented Queensland against New South Wales in Sydney. Against Ipswich in July the club registered another loss 13 behinds to 10.

== Disbanding ==
Prior to the end of the 1887 season, Brisbane FC fielded a much depleted side in August losing against Excelsiors 3 goals 13 to 2 goals 7, Brisbane FC did not take part in the last round of QFA matches, however L. H. Nathan acted as an impartial umpire. This is the last mention of the club playing matches and contemporary sources note that they had played their last match, so it would have been well known in football circles that the club intended to fold for the 1888 season.

It is not recorded, but the demise of the club may have been the result the rapidly increasing popularity of rugby, with some Brisbane FC players possibly electing to join the newly formed rugby clubs, Fireflies and Wanderers (followed by the creation of four more rugby clubs by 1885–86). As rugby historian Sean Fagan noted:

The defining moment in the code battle came with the 1886 Queensland [rugby] side, who defeated NSW for the first time in Sydney. "The success of this team undoubtedly won the day for rugby game in Queensland. The Victorian game supporters were struggling hard to uphold the premier position they had gained but after the brilliant performance of the 1886 team, who lost only one match through their tour, the rugby game became very popular and the next season several new clubs were formed and the Victorian game began to wane" (QRU Annual, 1902).

Fagan further noted:

As the decade [1880s] came to a close, The Queensland Figaro summed up the state of play in the colony as "Rugby, an unbounded success; Melbourne rules very sick indeed, in fact on their last legs; British Association Rules [soccer], also in a sickly state but if anything showing more life than the Victorian game".

== Management ==
Year	President	Vice-President	Secretary	Treasurer	Members
1866			GEO Cowlishaw		20
1867			T.A. Board		
1868	J.P. Bell	F.H.Hart	T.A. Board	J.B. Carver	45
1869	J.P. Bell	F.H.Hart	R. Davidson	J.B. Carver	unknown
1870			R. Davidson	J.B. Carver	+16
1871	Dr O'Doherty		R. R. Davidson	J.B. Carver	unknown
1872	Dr O'Doherty		R. R. Davidson	J. Darley	unknown
1873	Dr O'Doherty				unknown
1874	Dr O'Doherty		R. R. Davidson	J. Brennan	unknown
1875	Dr O'Doherty				
1876	Dr O'Doherty		J. O' Bourne	J. Brennan	unknown
1877	Dr O'Doherty				
1878	Dr O'Doherty		E. C. Bingemann	Eric Scott	unknown
1879	Dr O'Doherty	W. L. Fowles, J. O. Bourne	E. C. Bingemann	Eric Scott	+20
1880	Dr O'Doherty	J. O. Bourne	W. L. Fowles	T. Welshby	

== Notable players ==
- Cedric Wills (younger brother of Tom Wills)
- George Henry Pritchard (Brisbane grammarian who captained Queensland in both Rugby and Victorian Rules)

== Later Brisbane Australian football clubs ==
Since this time, several Australian Football clubs have borne the Brisbane name, including "Brisbanes" in the 1920s, the Brisbane Bears in the 1980s and 1990s and more recently, the Brisbane Lions. However, these clubs are not connected with the original Brisbane Football Club.

== See also ==
- History of soccer in Brisbane, Queensland
