= Cleveland Pioneer Cemetery =

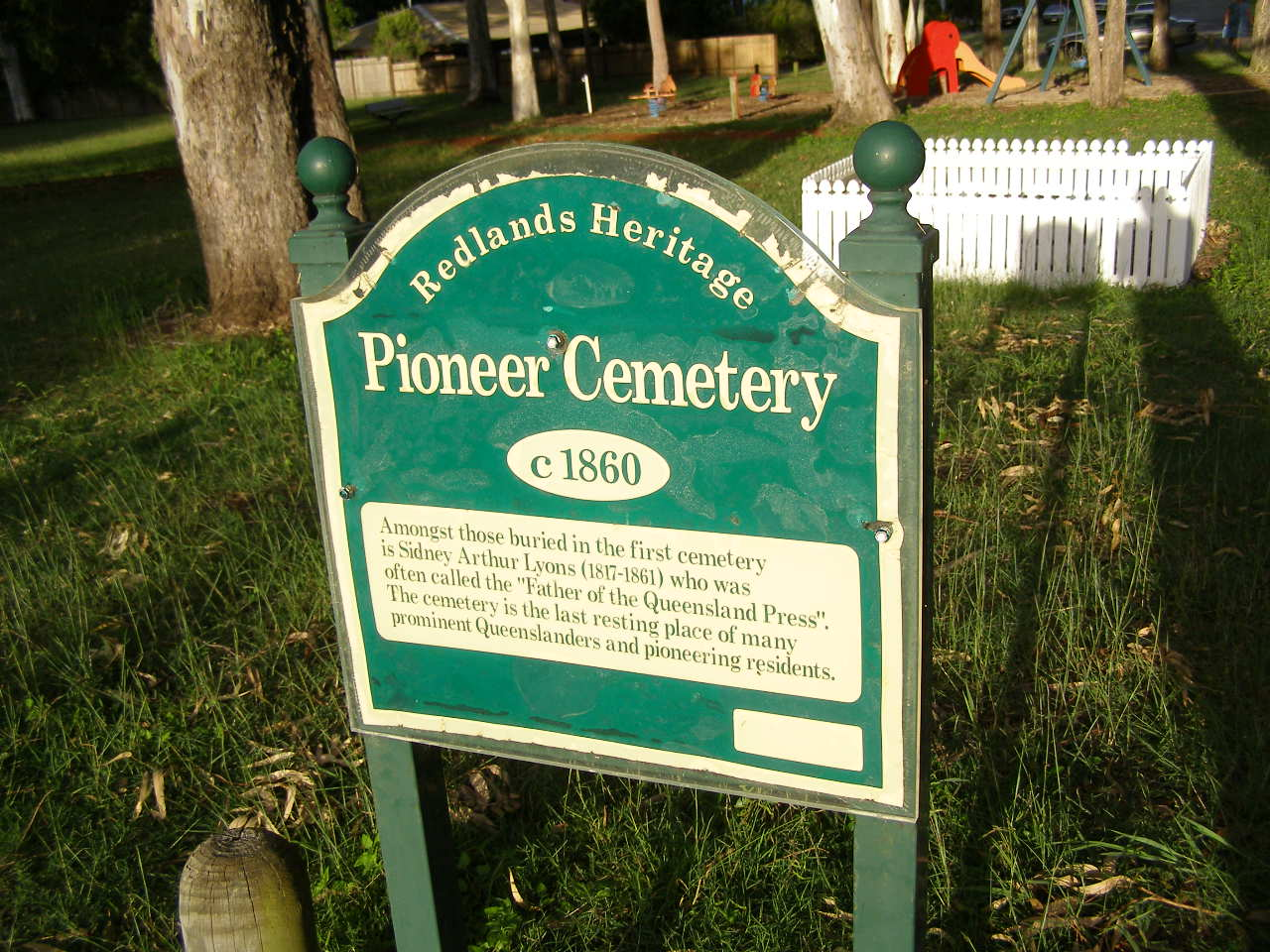
- Cleveland Pioneer Cemetery, signage, 2006

- Location within Queensland Location within Australia
- 27.5281°S 153.2570°E
- Location: Lisa Street, Cleveland, City of Redland, Queensland, Australia

Queensland Heritage Register
- Official name: Cleveland No.1 Cemetery, Pioneer Cemetery, Cleveland Cemetery (No. 1)
- Type: archaeological
- Designated: 18 September 2009
- Reference no.: 645608
- Significant period: 1858–1873 (historical use)

Cleveland Pioneer Cemetery is a heritage-listed cemetery at Lisa Street, Cleveland, City of Redland, Queensland, Australia. It is also known as Cleveland No.1 Cemetery. It was added to the Queensland Heritage Register on 18 September 2009.

== History ==
Centred on Cleveland, the area which was to later become Redland Shire was one of the earliest areas in Queensland to be opened to free settlement following the closure of the Moreton Bay Penal Settlement in 1842. Its location on the shores of Moreton Bay saw substantial efforts to establish Cleveland as the official port for the Moreton Bay District.

Cleveland was declared as a township in December 1850. The first land sales took place in 1851. The earliest European settlers in the area had interests in pastoralism, business and shipping.

A site for the first cemetery in Cleveland was surveyed by H. Rawnsley in December 1858 on a site bounded by Wellington, Queen, Russell and Smith Streets, within section 83, Parish of Cleveland. Seven separate sections were surveyed for various denominations including Church of England, Presbyterians, Wesleyans, Roman Catholics, Jews, and "Various Denominations". By 1864 the population of the Cleveland Township was 145, with the main occupations being labourer, farmer and timber-getter.

The cemetery was used until 1873 when it was deemed to be unsuitable due to the "swampy nature of the soil". Section 112 immediately across Wellington Street to the west was gazetted as the new cemetery.

There are 11 identified burials in the Pioneer Cemetery in the 15 years between its establishment in 1858 and its replacement in 1873, including:

- Bridget Clary, d.2 May 1860, Child
- Emily (Amelia) Hobbs, d. 28 July 1860
- Arthur Sidney Lyon, d. 22 October 1861, Journalist, Editor
- William Henry Sherrin, d. 11 November 1864, Child
- George Sherrin, d. 9 February 1865 – Robert HAMILTON, d. 11 April 1869
- Henry Bottomley, Unknown dates, Carpenter
- John Dawson, Unknown dates
- J. Neale, Unknown dates, Fisherman
- William Rae, Unknown dates, Publican, Brighton Hotel, Cleveland
- Andrew Whelan, Unknown dates, Blacksmith

Systematic historical research into individual burials has not been undertaken. The exact number of burials at the cemetery remains unknown. It is also unknown whether any burials were removed and re- interred at the Cleveland No.2 Cemetery.

The most prominent of the known individuals buried in the cemetery is Arthur Sidney Lyon, who died in Cleveland on 22 October 1861 (QRG 1861). Note that he is incorrectly recorded on memorial stone and interpretation signage at the cemetery as Sydney Arthur Lyons. Lyon established the Moreton Bay Courier with partner James Swan with its first edition released on 20 June 1846. The Moreton Bay Courier later became The Courier-Mail. Lyon apparently resigned as editor in December of the following year following arguments with his partner, however he is still listed as the publisher for the newspaper until its purchase by Theophilus Pugh in May 1861. Lyon went on to establish and run the Moreton Bay Free Press from 1849 to 1855, the North Australian in Ipswich from 1855 to 1858, followed by the Darling Downs Gazette from 1858, presumably until his death in 1861.

By 1903, the original section 83 had been divided into four lots of around five acres each. The 1903 survey plan of the cemetery identifies a surveyed rectangular area within the cemetery reserve area containing 23 lines, possibly indicating graves. It is uncertain whether these markings represent the actual number of graves visible at the time of survey or whether they indicate a general acknowledgement of the presence of graves.

In October 1905 land in Section 83 was offered for sale except the cemetery which was withheld from auction because of its previous use. Cleveland Shire Council objected to the sale of the land "on the grounds that several people have been buried therein and that it was once used for a cemetery. Unless absolutely necessary, a reserve of this description should never be alienated".

The council objected again to the lease of the land in 1924, and raised the issue again in 1937. A cemetery reserve was finally gazetted as R1436 on 11 September 1937 with access provided from Queen Street.

A memorial with the names of ten persons interred in the cemetery was erected at the site by teacher Merv Beitz from Cleveland State School as a practical history exercise for his class. The plaque on the memorial was supplied by Redland Shire Council. When the memorial was erected there were no headstones or other grave markers at the site.

== Description ==
The Cleveland Pioneer Cemetery constitutes Scott Street Park and a vehicular access track running north–south to the park from Queen Street. The entire area is grassed with numerous large shade trees, consisting mainly of eucalypt species. No headstones or obvious signs of grave plots remain visible. A mound, approximately three metres wide runs south along the vehicular track from Queen Street and angles from the northwest to southeast across the identified cemetery reserve towards the playground located in the southeast quadrant of the park. The mound is approximately 40–50 centimetres (16–20 in) high at its apex and is likely related to the installation of services such as water into or through the park.

A playground area is also located within the park and measures approximately 10 by 15 metres (33 ft × 49 ft). It is delineated by concrete edging and filled with sandy loam to approximately 10 centimetres (3.9 in) depth below the current ground surface. The installation and use of the playground equipment is unlikely to have caused major subsurface disturbance. There is a bench and a water tap situated adjacent to the north of the playground area, and timber bollards used to delineate the park area. None of the modern elements installed in the park are of archaeological importance.

Adjacent to Lisa Street is a memorial plaque commemorating the early burials in the cemetery. The plaque is installed on a white concrete base and is surrounded by a white timber picket fence approx 1 metre (3 ft 3 in) high. The inscription on the plaque consists of lead letters and reads:

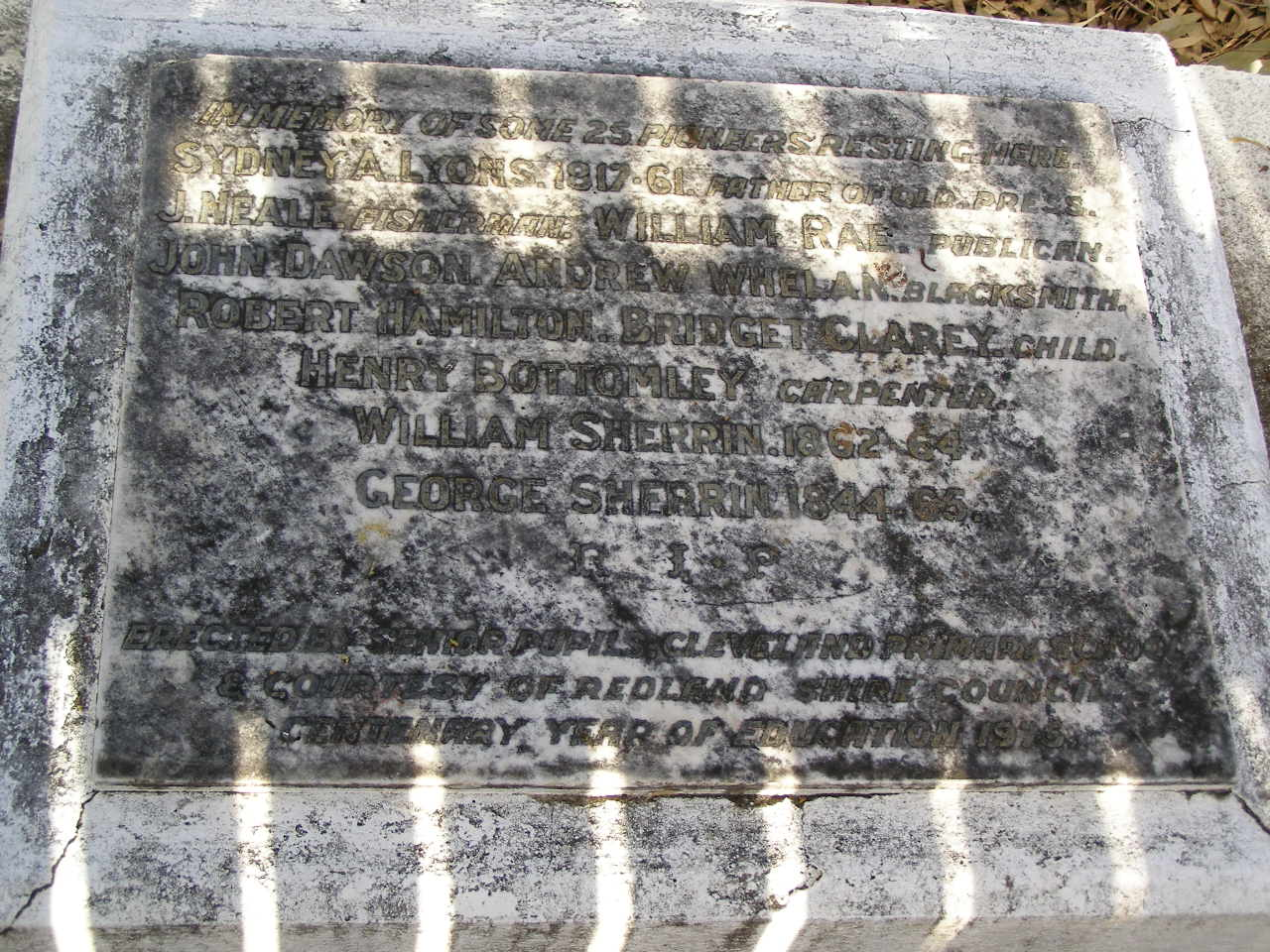
Cleveland Pioneer Cemetery, memorial plaque, 2006

IN MEMORY OF SOME 25 PIONEERS RESTING HERE.
SYDNEY A. LYONS. 1816–61. FATHER OF QLD PRESS.
J. NEALE. FISHERMAN. WILLIAM RAE. PUBLICAN.
JOHN DAWSON. ANDREW WHELAN. BLACKSMITH.
ROBERT HAMILTON. BRIDGET CLAREY. CHILD.
HENRY BOTTOMLEY. CARPENTER.
WILLIAM SHERRIN. 1862–64.
GEORGE SHERRIN. 1844–66.

ERECTED BY SENIOR PUPILS, CLEVELAND PRIMARY SCHOOL
COURTESY OF REDLAND SHIRE COUNCIL.
CENTENARY YEAR OF EDUCATION 1975.

An interpretative sign is installed adjacent to the memorial stone at the Lisa Street access to the park.

== Heritage listing ==
Cleveland Pioneer Cemetery was listed on the Queensland Heritage Register on 18 September 2009 having satisfied the following criteria.

The Cleveland Pioneer Cemetery is an important aspect of Queensland's history being the site of the first cemetery established on the mainland in Redlands, one of the first areas opened up to free settlement in southeast Queensland. The cemetery is important historically as the burial site of Arthur Sidney Lyon (1861) who was known as "The Father of the Queensland Press". Lyon established the Moreton Bay Courier, amongst other early newspapers.

The importance of the cemetery to the community was memorialised in 1975 through the installation of a memorial stone identifying those known to have been buried at the Pioneer cemetery. The presence of interpretive signage demonstrates a continuing community association with the place.

The Cleveland Pioneer Cemetery has the potential to provide new information that will contribute to our understanding of the early history and demography of settlement in the Redlands region. Archaeological investigations at the site have potential to reveal subsurface evidence of the actual location and number of burials in the cemetery. Such investigation may answer research questions about the organisation and layout of the cemetery and how this differed from the original plans. Archaeological investigations also have the potential to reveal information about whether graves were later moved to the nearby (and later) Cleveland No.2 Cemetery.

Additional archaeological investigations have potential to contribute to the comparative analysis of burial practices across Queensland and through time. Important research questions can be formulated about the actual burial practices in early satellite settlements and regional communities.

Archaeological investigations at the site have potential provide important information about social structures within an important and early European settlement in Queensland's history. Social structure will be expressed through the pattern of burials and layout of the cemetery.
