= The Queensland Times =

Online newspaper

- Type: Newspaper
- Format: Tabloid
- Owner: News Corp Australia
- Founded: 1859
- Language: English
- Headquarters: Ipswich, Queensland, Australia; 260 Brisbane Street; West Ipswich, QLD 4305
- Circulation: 10,804 Monday-Friday; 14,153 Saturday
- Website: qt.com.au

The Queensland Times is an online newspaper serving Ipswich and surrounds in Queensland, Australia. The newspaper is owned by News Corp Australia. The circulation of The Queensland Times is 10,804 Monday to Friday and 14,153 on Saturday.

The Queensland Times is circulated to the Ipswich city area (all residential suburbs including the new the suburbs Springfield, Springfield Lakes and Brookwater) and the Ipswich rural area including Harrisville, Rosewood, Laidley, Forest Hill, Lowood, Boonah, Aratula, Gatton, Esk and Toogoolawah. The Queensland Times website is part of the APN Regional News Network.

== History ==
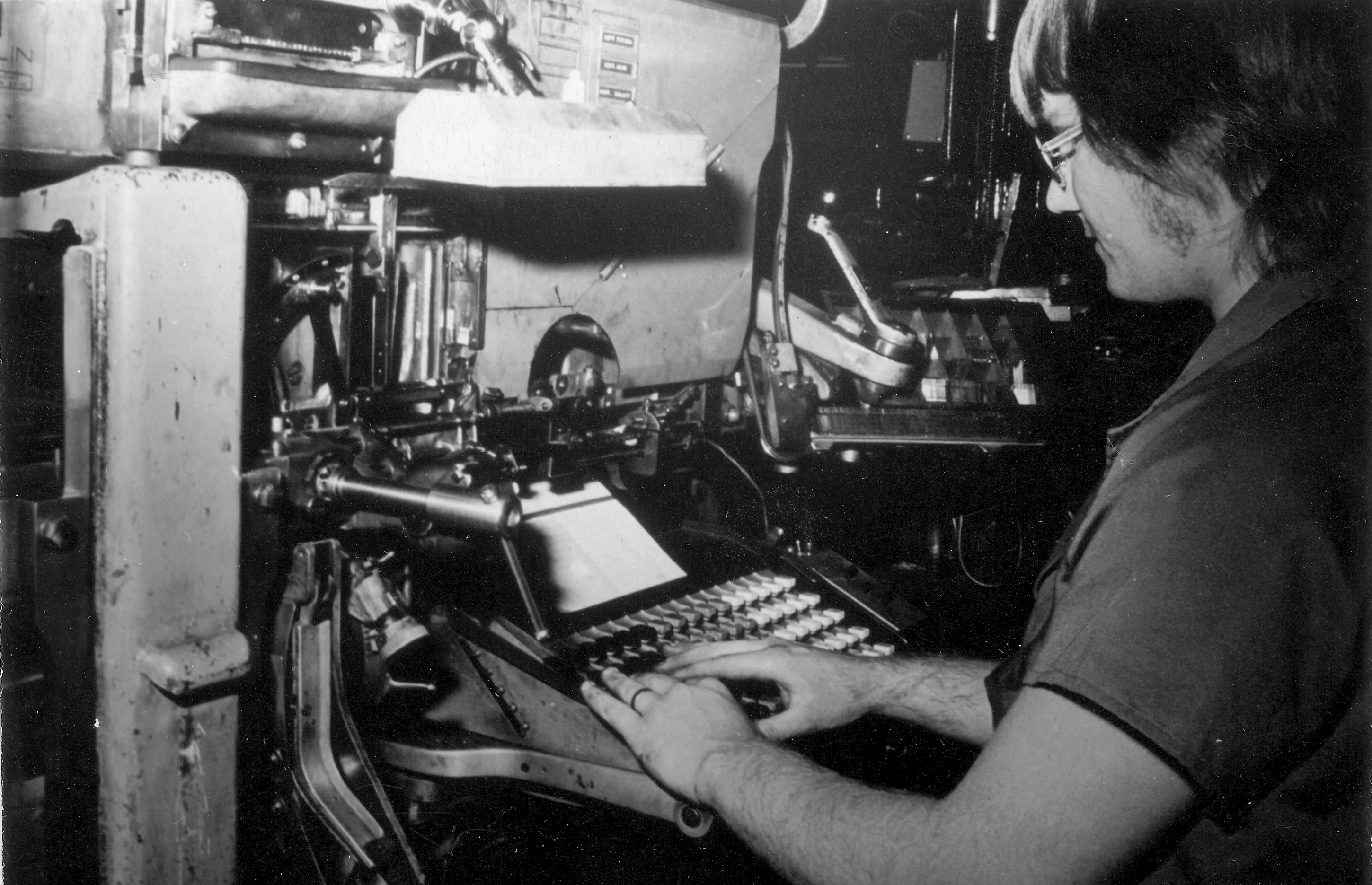
An apprentice Linotype operator at The Queensland Times in 1975.

The Queensland Times is the oldest surviving provincial paper in Queensland. Founded on 4 July 1859 as the Ipswich Herald, it has continued ever since. Until a printer's strike briefly interrupted production in 1972, it had the proud record of never having missed a scheduled issue, in spite of fires, floods and machinery breakdowns.

It was not, however, the first newspaper in Ipswich. That honour belongs to the North Australian, founded in 1855 and having on its staff two men who were to play a major part in the establishment of other Queensland newspapers, Hugh Parkinson, the foremen printer, and Arthur Sidney Lyon, the editor. The publishing office of this paper was moved to Brisbane in 1863.

One of the main aims of the Ipswich Herald was to promote Ipswich's claims to be capital city of the Moreton bay colony as separation from New South Wales loomed. It was bought in 1861 by Hugh Parkinson and two other north Australian employees, Hugh Bowring Sloman and Francis Kidner. They changed its name to The Queensland Times and said it "would undertake to speak as from the centre of authority, the capital, and would oppose centralization in Brisbane." The editor was John Charlton Thompson, who later surveyed and laid out the city of Bundaberg. The greatest success story connected with the paper was that of a young lad, William Kippen, who rose from the position of paper seller in 1862 to become chairman of directors in 1914.

Between the 1860s and the 1880s the bi-weekly Queensland Times faced competition from other newspapers, but outlasted them all. On Tuesday, 8 October 1861, the Ipswich Herald merged to form The Queensland Times, Ipswich Herald, and General Advertiser.

It became a morning daily in 1899, but a depression forced it to revert to a tri-weekly publication until, in 1908, it became a daily again. The Queensland Times is owned by the APN News & Media Ltd Group. It was subsequently bought by NewsCorp.

Along with many other regional Australian newspapers owned by NewsCorp, the newspaper ceased print editions in June 2020 and became an online-only publication.

=== Digitisation ===
The Queensland Times has been digitised as part of the Australian Newspapers Digitisation Program of the National Library of Australia.

== The Ipswich Herald and General Advertiser ==
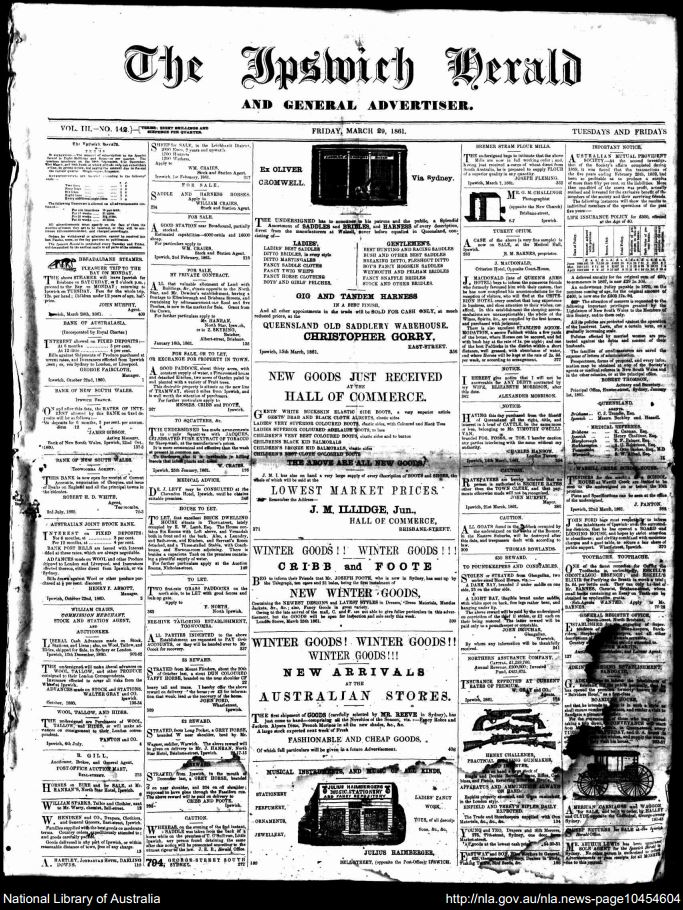
Front page of The Ipswich Herald and General Advertiser, Friday 29 March 1861

The Ipswich Herald and General Advertiser was the second newspaper published in Ipswich, Queensland. It was established in 1859 by Central Queensland separationists, who argued for a separation from New South Wales. The paper merged with another to become the Queensland Times, Ipswich Herald and General Advertiser when it changed ownership in October 1861. The newspaper later claimed to be the leading proponent for populating, opening up, and exploiting the resources of Queensland. It is now known as The Queensland Times, and is the oldest surviving newspaper in Queensland.

=== History ===
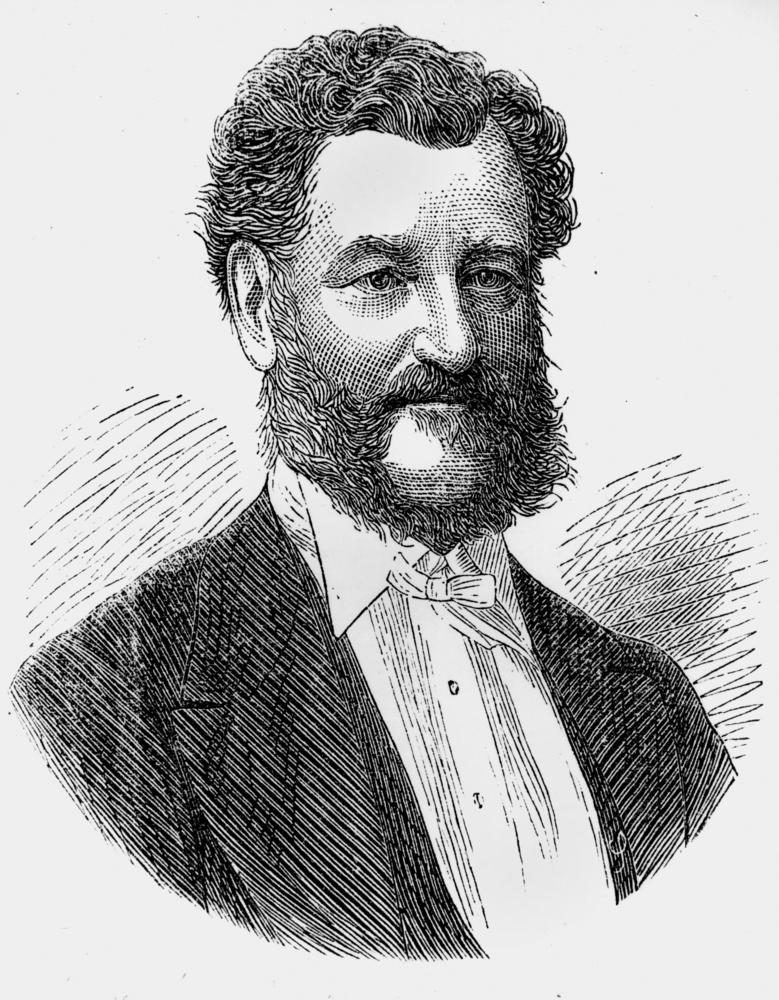
Founding co-owner Arthur Macalister went on to become a three-time Premier of Queensland

The Ipswich Herald and General Advertiser was established and owned by Walter Gray, H.M. Cockburn, Arthur Macalister and John Rankin, Central Queensland separationists. It launched on 4 July 1859 with an ex-Sydney Morning Herald employee Edmund Gregory acting as both publisher and editor.

An editorial under the pseudonym "Red Gum" in the 4 July 1899 issue: —

The "Ipswich Herald and General Advertiser" was established by a private company of ardent Separationists, comprising the late Messrs. Arthur Macalister, H. M. Cockburn, Walter Gray, and John Rankin; and its first issue appeared on 4 July 1859. Mr. Edmund Gregory, the present Queensland Government Printer, was the printer and publisher of the "'Ipswich Herald", having been specially en-gaged in Sydney to manage the paper, and its offices were situated in Ellenborough-street, about on the site where the railway bridge crosses the line.

Separation was achieved just prior to the first edition: the proclamation by Queen Victoria established a colony separate to New South Wales called Queensland. News of this proclamation featured in the first issue.

The newspaper was one of three regional Queensland newspapers published during the 1850s, the first in Ipswich was named The North Australian. In 1861 Gregory left to join the Moreton Bay Courier (now the Courier-Mail), and the paper was bought by three former employees of The North Australian, Hugh Parkinson, F. Kidner and J. Sloman. It was then known as Queensland Times, Ipswich Herald and General Advertiser, with the new ownership keen to represent the interests of Queensland more generally.

In 1874 the Elenborough Street site was purchased by the railways and the paper moved to "Dowden's corner".

=== Digitisation ===
The Ipswich Herald and General Advertiser has been digitised as part of the Australian Newspapers Digitisation Program of the National Library of Australia.

== See also ==
- List of newspapers in Australia
