= Ercildoune =

Ercildoune originates from the Gaelic Arciol Dun and may refer to:

- Ercildoune, Footscray, a former bank building in Melbourne, Victoria, Australia
- Ercildoune, Victoria, a locale in the Grampians region of Victoria, Australia
  - Ercildoun (homestead), a homestead and former pastoral property near the local of Ercildoune
- Ercildoune, 85 Elizabeth Bay Road, a house in Sydney, Australia, designed by Harry Seidler
- Arcioldun, the historical name for Earlston, a town in Scotland
