= Coochin Coochin Homestead =

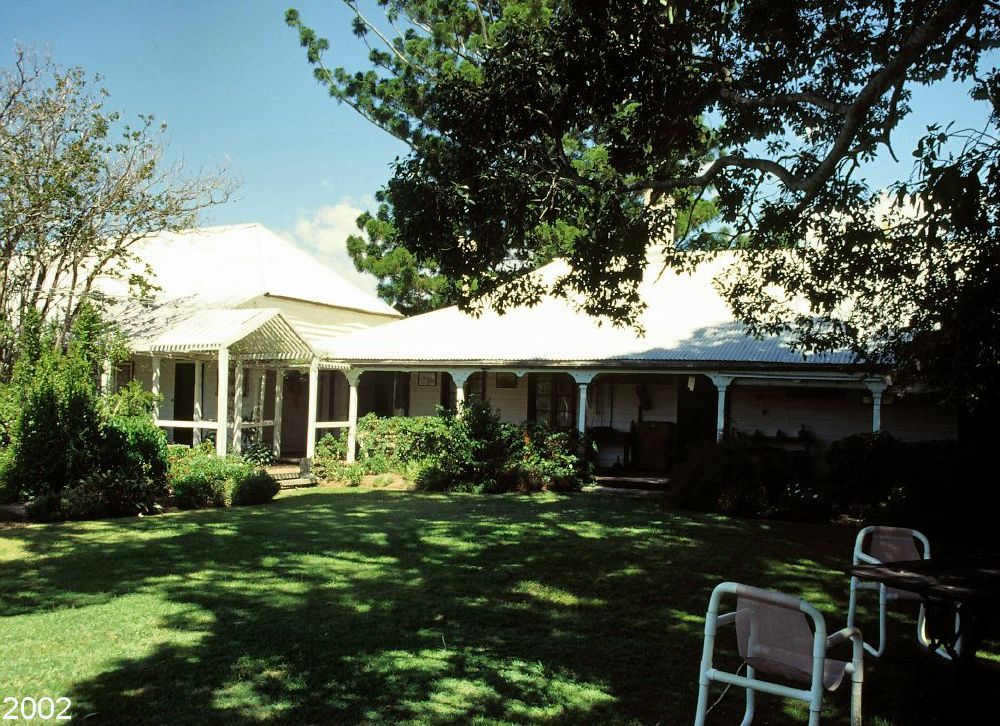
- Coochin Coochin Homestead, 2002

- Location within Queensland Location within Australia
- 28.1066°S 152.6303°E
- Location: J Bell Road, Coochin, Scenic Rim Region, Queensland, Australia

History
- Design period: 1840s–1860s (mid-19th century)
- Built: c. 1840s–c. 1920s

Queensland Heritage Register
- Official name: Coochin Coochin Homestead
- Type: state heritage (landscape, built)
- Designated: 21 August 1992
- Reference no.: 600034
- Significant period: 1840s (historical)
- Significant components: garden/grounds, views to, residential accommodation – main house, trees of social, historic or special significance, fencing, garage, shed – hay, meat house, shed/s, views from, vista/s

Coochin Coochin Homestead is a heritage-listed homestead at J Bell Road, Coochin, Scenic Rim Region, Queensland, Australia. It was built from 1840s circa to 1920s circa. It was added to the Queensland Heritage Register on 21 August 1992.

== History ==
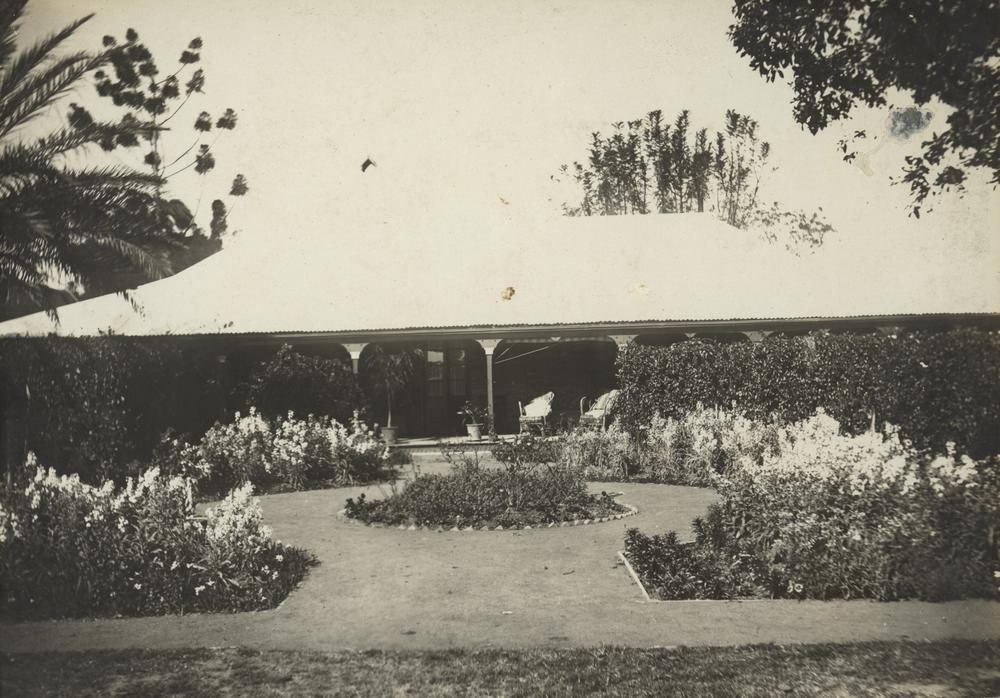
Approach to the homestead through the garden at Coochin Coochin, 1920

In 1842, the area known as Delhunty's Plain was settled as a pastoral run by David Hunter and his partner James Fyffe. In 1844, the lease was transferred to John Kent, who was first to re-use the traditional name of Coochin Coochin, an anglicised version of ga-jin-ga-jin ("red stones"). The main section of the homestead was constructed some time in the 1840s.

A report in the North Australian, Ipswich and General Advertiser in 1858 by the Coochin Coochin superintendent, Mr. Willis, reported a breach of the Master and Servant Act at Coochin Coochin by two men, Ironmonger and Foreman, who were subsequently fined £1 and £2/6/6 respectively. Newspaper reports, in February 1861, briefly detailed an incident involving approximately sixty aborigines attacking the station being repelled by a revolver used by wife of station owner L.E. Lester. At a later inquiry into the Native Police Force, that investigated this occasion, heard evidence from Dr Henry Challinor, that "attributed the deprecations committed by the blacks to their having been deprived of their hunting ground". The position of the homestead being positioned too close of dense scrub was commented in the report as aiding the attack.

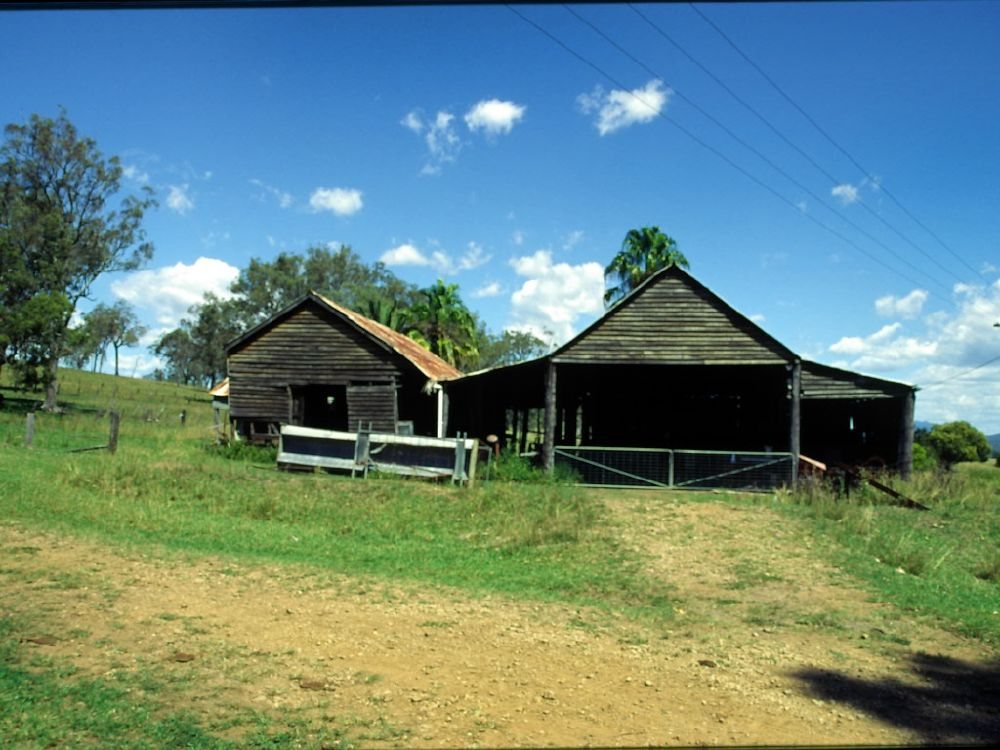
Outbuildings, 2002

The homestead was moved to its current position in 1871.

In 1877, 8,500 acres (3,400 ha) were resumed from the property and offered for selection on 19 April 1877.

In 1883, the property sold to James Thomas Marsh Bell, part owner of Camboon Station in the Dawson Valley acquired the property in partnership with F C Hyde.

In the 1920s, Coochin Coochin Homestead became the social focus of the area, hosting many large parties and entertaining many notable visitors. From the end of the Second World War until 1965, Coochin Coochin operated as a small dairy with a maximum of sixty milking cows. The property is currently owned by the Bell family.

== Heritage listing ==
Coochin Coochin Homestead was listed on the Queensland Heritage Register on 21 August 1992 having satisfied the following criteria.

The place is important in demonstrating the evolution or pattern of Queensland's history.

Coochin Coochin, established in 1842 as Dulhunty's Plain, was one of the earliest pastoral runs of the Moreton region. The earliest fabric at Coochn Coochin homestead dates to the 1840s. The place has strong historical significance as important evidence of the first wave of pastoral activity in Queensland (at that time the Moreton district of New South Wales), and is important in illustrating the evolution of the pastoral way of life in Queensland.

The place is important in demonstrating the principal characteristics of a particular class of cultural places.

Coochin Coochin Homestead is a sprawling complex of structures, forms and landscaping elements, which retains a high degree of integrity and intactness. It is well maintained and is important in demonstrating the principal characteristics of a particular class of cultural places: early and evolving pastoral homesteads in Queensland. The main house (consisting of connected pavilions dating mainly from the 1840s, 1880s and the early 1900s), extensive garden, meat house and hay sheds, and the physical relationships between these elements, are important in illustrating a particular way of life associated with pastoral activity. Of special interest is a tree yard, famous for a series of plantings by distinguished 20th century visitors, initiated by Lord and Lady Chelmsford when they visited in 1907.

The place is important because of its aesthetic significance.

The homestead complex occupies a picturesque setting amidst national parks, and the house sits within an attractive established garden. The homestead has been enhanced over 150 years of working life and is of strong aesthetic significance, engendered by its setting, its rustic forms and materials, and the juxtaposition of forms.

The place has a strong or special association with a particular community or cultural group for social, cultural or spiritual reasons.

Coochin Coochin has a special association for the Queensland community as one of the earliest stations established in Queensland. The place is well known in Queensland, and has been described in numerous heritage and history publications.

The place has a special association with the life or work of a particular person, group or organisation of importance in Queensland's history.

The place is important for its association with the Bell family, who have owned Coochin Coochin since 1883, and have made a significant contribution to the development of Queensland pastoralism and agriculture. Ernest Bell was a prominent member of the community, serving as Member for Fassifern in the Queensland Legislative Assembly from 1913 to 1930, and on numerous boards. The Bells were renowned for their hospitality, attracting many distinguished visitors to Coochin Coochin through much of the 20th century.
