= James Thomson (Victorian politician) =

Australian pastoralist and politician

James Thomson (c.1797 – 23 March 1859) was a pastoralist and politician in colonial Victoria, a member of the Victorian Legislative Council.

== Early life ==
Thomson was born in Edinburgh, Scotland, the son of John Thomson, a watchmaker, and Anne, née Young.

== Colonial Australia ==
Thomson arrived in Hobart in January 1823 and the Port Phillip District around 1840. On 14 June 1853 Thomson was elected to the unicameral Victorian Legislative Council for Ripon, Hampden, Grenville and Polwarth. Thomson held this position until resigning in February 1854.

Thomson died near Port Fairy, Victoria on 23 March 1859, he had married Elizabeth Glen Boynton in 1856.

Victorian Legislative Council
| New seat | Member for Ripon, Hampden, Grenville and Polwarth; June 1853 – February 1854; With: Adolphus Goldsmith 1853; John Charlton 1853–1854 | Succeeded by Colin Campbell |
