= Beaufort, Victoria =

Beaufort
- Town
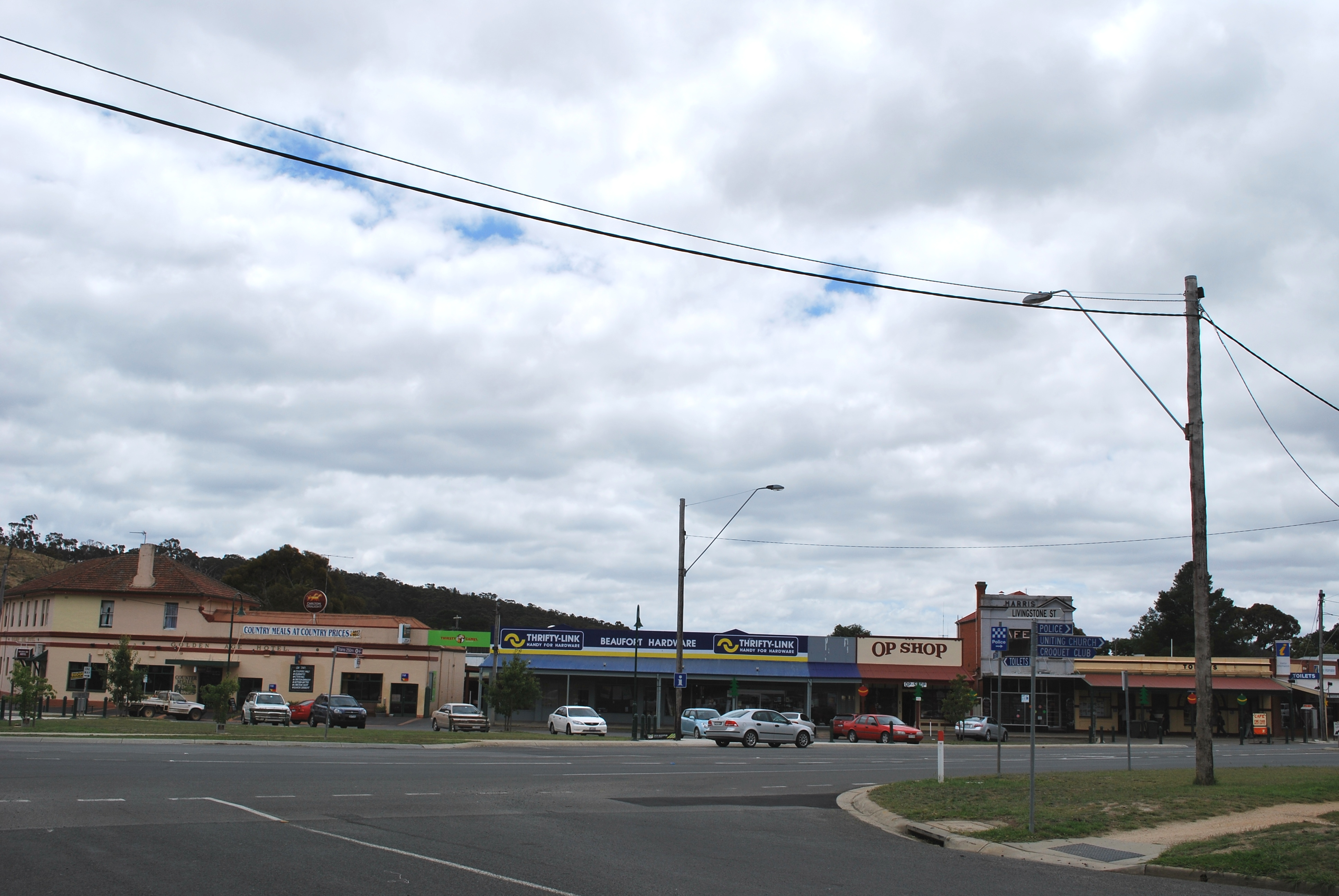
- Main Street, Beaufort

- Coordinates: 37°25′50″S 143°23′00″E
- Country: Australia
- State: Victoria
- LGA: Pyrenees Shire
- Location: 164 km (102 mi) W of Melbourne; 50 km (31 mi) W of Ballarat; 44 km (27 mi) E of Ararat; 96 km (60 mi) N of Camperdown

Government
  - State electorate: Ripon
  - Federal division: Wannon
- Elevation: 387.0 m (1,269.7 ft)

Population
  - Total: 1,539 (2016 census)
- Postcode: 3373
- Mean max temp: 17.5 °C (63.5 °F)
- Mean min temp: 7.1 °C (44.8 °F)
- Annual rainfall: 685.2 mm (26.98 in)

Beaufort is a town in Victoria, Australia. It is located on the Western Highway midway between Ararat and Ballarat, in the Pyrenees Shire local government area. It is 387 metres (1,270 ft) above sea level. At the 2021 census, Beaufort had a population of 1,712. The town takes its name either from Rear-Admiral Francis Beaufort or a Welsh village in Monmouthshire.

The area was once occupied by the Wadawurrung Indigenous Australians who called the area Peerick or Yarram-yarram.

== History ==
Thomas Mitchell passed through the district on his expedition of 1836. Early settlers in the area were Kenneth Kirkland his wife Katherine Kirkland and her two brothers in 1838. The station was taken over by Adolphus Goldsmith in 1841 and he developed the property into a rich grazing enterprise. Lake Goldsmith was named after him.

Gold was discovered in 1852, with another gold rush from 1854 at nearby Fiery Creek. The Fiery Creek diggings supported four townships, Beaufort, Yam Holes Creek, View Point and Southern Cross, during the 1850s. The population on the fields reportedly reached approximately 100,000 people at its height in the late 1850s and produced 450,000 ounces of gold over a two-year period, 1855–1856.

The town was surveyed in 1857 and town allotments were sold from 1858. By 1860, Beaufort had become a small but strong agricultural, pastoral and timber district. Beaufort's Court House was built in 1864 and the Post Office renamed as Beaufort the same year.

== Climate ==
Beaufort has an elevation-influenced oceanic climate (Köppen: Cfb), with tepid, relatively dry summers and cool, wetter winters. Average maxima vary from 25.3 °C (77.5 °F) in January to 10.1 °C (50.2 °F) in July, while average minima fluctuate between 11.5 °C (52.7 °F) in February and 3.2 °C (37.8 °F) in July. Mean average annual precipitation is moderately low 685.2 mm (26.98 in), but is frequent, spread between 167.1 precipitation days. Consequently, the town is not sunny, experiencing 180.2 cloudy days and only 55.2 clear days annually. Extreme temperatures have ranged from 44.1 °C (111.4 °F) on 7 February 2009 to −6.0 °C (21.2 °F) on 21 July 1982. All climate data was sourced from Ballarat Airport, located 37.2 kilometres (23.1 mi) southeast of Nhill at slightly higher elevation (435 metres (1,427 ft)).

Climate data for Beaufort (sourced from Ballarat Airport) (37.51°S 143.79°E, 435 m AMSL) (1908–2024 normals & extremes)
Month	Jan	Feb	Mar	Apr	May	Jun	Jul	Aug	Sep	Oct	Nov	Dec	Year
Record high °C (°F)	42.0 (107.6)	44.1 (111.4)	37.9 (100.2)	32.2 (90.0)	26.1 (79.0)	21.6 (70.9)	19.1 (66.4)	23.0 (73.4)	27.9 (82.2)	33.4 (92.1)	37.3 (99.1)	43.5 (110.3)	44.1 (111.4)
Mean daily maximum °C (°F)	25.3 (77.5)	25.1 (77.2)	22.3 (72.1)	17.7 (63.9)	13.7 (56.7)	10.8 (51.4)	10.1 (50.2)	11.5 (52.7)	13.9 (57.0)	16.7 (62.1)	19.7 (67.5)	22.7 (72.9)	17.5 (63.4)
Mean daily minimum °C (°F)	11.0 (51.8)	11.5 (52.7)	10.0 (50.0)	7.5 (45.5)	5.7 (42.3)	4.0 (39.2)	3.2 (37.8)	3.7 (38.7)	4.8 (40.6)	6.2 (43.2)	7.9 (46.2)	9.5 (49.1)	7.1 (44.8)
Record low °C (°F)	0.7 (33.3)	−1.4 (29.5)	−0.6 (30.9)	−4.1 (24.6)	−4.5 (23.9)	−4.6 (23.7)	−6.0 (21.2)	−5.0 (23.0)	−4.6 (23.7)	−3.6 (25.5)	−1.0 (30.2)	−1.0 (30.2)	−6.0 (21.2)
Average precipitation mm (inches)	40.2 (1.58)	42.2 (1.66)	41.6 (1.64)	51.4 (2.02)	63.9 (2.52)	62.6 (2.46)	66.1 (2.60)	73.4 (2.89)	70.6 (2.78)	66.9 (2.63)	56.0 (2.20)	50.1 (1.97)	685.2 (26.98)
Average precipitation days (≥ 0.2 mm)	7.7	7.1	9.5	12.6	16.5	18.1	20.1	19.7	16.8	15.4	12.7	10.9	167.1
Average afternoon relative humidity (%)	42	44	48	57	69	76	75	70	63	59	54	47	59
Average dew point °C (°F)	9.1 (48.4)	9.6 (49.3)	8.4 (47.1)	7.4 (45.3)	7.0 (44.6)	6.0 (42.8)	5.0 (41.0)	5.0 (41.0)	5.8 (42.4)	6.9 (44.4)	8.1 (46.6)	8.2 (46.8)	7.2 (45.0)
Source: Bureau of Meteorology (1908–2024 normals & extremes)

=== Land development ===
In the mid-2010s, the town and Pyrenees Shire had realised that there was no viable answer for a land developer to create new housing in the area. Pyrenees decided to become its own developer, purchased land just west of the town, and undertook the planning processes of subdividing into around 100 blocks of 700 to 1,100 square metres, road alignments and utilities connection before selling the lots through a real estate agent.

In 2023, with Correa Park fully developed, Pyrenees is embarking on its second housing project, after purchasing another parcel of land on Burke Street on the north-west side of the town, around 10 minutes walking distance from the train station. There will be 20 to 30 lots of between 300 and 700 square metres.

== Education ==
Beaufort has one Kinder - Year 12 State School, located at the original Beaufort Secondary School site. The original State Primary School site, currently, lies empty. On the site of the original Elizabeth Watkins Kindergarten, in Havelock Street, is the new Ambulance Station. (This is opposite the Beaufort Hospital, and next to the Wortherspoon Lane Playground. Also a new CFA Fire Station on the main Street at 2-6 Racecourse Road has just opened and boasts three drive-through engine bays as well as improved office space, workshops and meeting facilities.

There is also a six-bay external shed to house the fire trucks and a dedicated car park for volunteers.. Adult Education Programs are run from the Beaufort Community House & Learning Centre in Neill Street.

== Transport ==
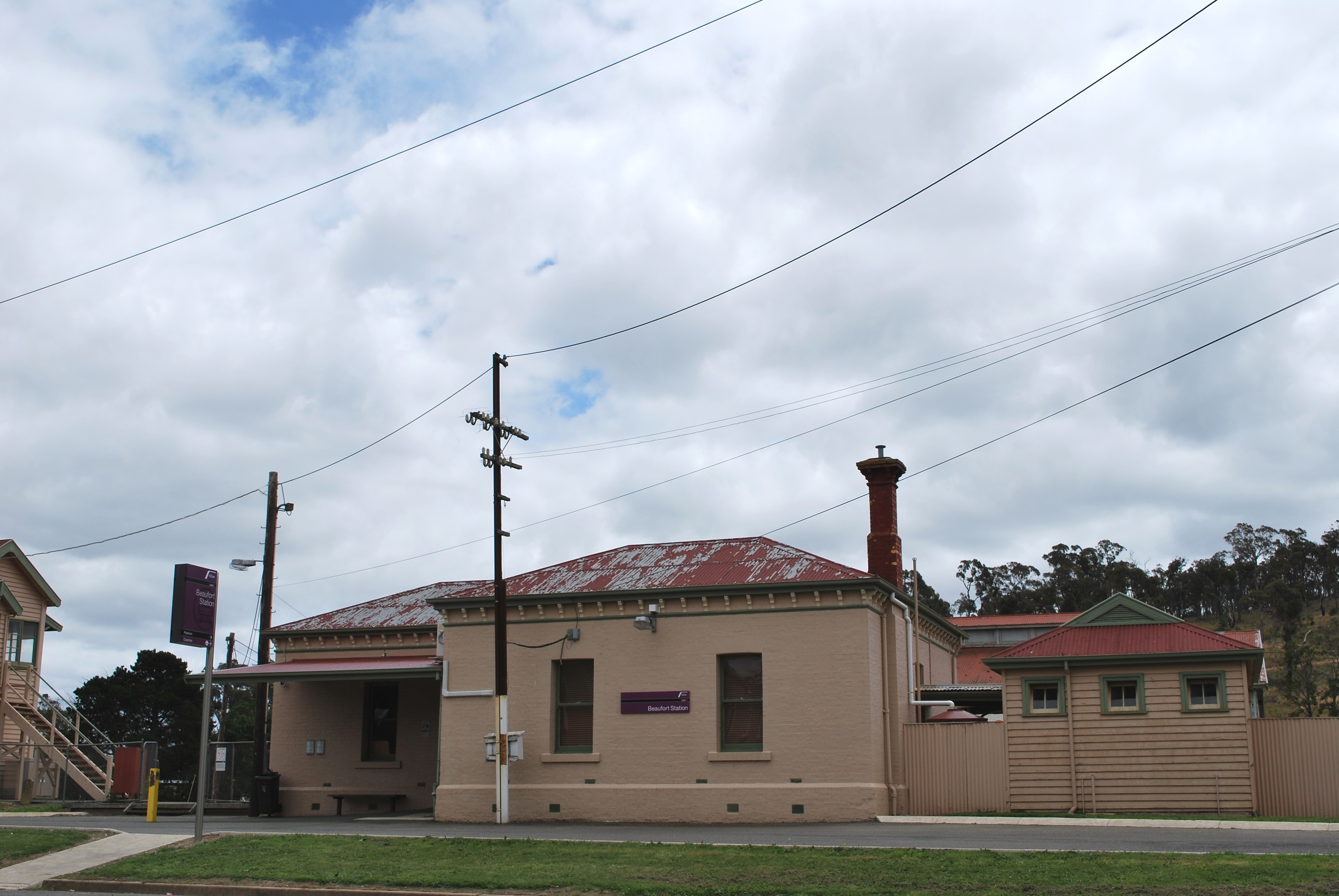
Beaufort Railway Station

Beaufort is approximately 164 kilometres (102 mi) west from the state capital Melbourne. The Western Highway runs through the town and is the main highway between Melbourne and Adelaide.

The town is serviced by railway at the Beaufort railway station on the Ararat railway line.

== Sports and culture ==
The town has an Australian Rules football club competing in the Central Highlands Football League.

Beaufort is primarily known around the state for the five-day music and arts festival, the Rainbow Serpent Festival which has been held since 1998 during January on the outskirts of the town.

In 2024, the town received media attention when YouTubers Misfit Minds uploaded a prank video posing as representatives for an international Chinese development company called "Mindware Construction and Development" and proposed demolishing the heritage listed town Rotunda to build a 20-storey McDonald's complex. The prank climaxed with a town hall event, and they were eventually fined $1154 by the local council.

== Notable people ==
- Bernard O'Dowd (poet), was born in Beaufort and spent his early years in the town.
- Brad Crouch grew up in Beaufort.
- Matt Crouch grew up in Beaufort.

== Twin town ==
- (United States) Beaufort, North Carolina
