= The Toowoomba Chronicle =

Australian newspaper

- Type: Daily newspaper
- Format: Tabloid
- Owner: News Corp Australia
- Editor: Steve Etwell
- News editor: Will Hunter
- Founded: 1922
- Language: English
- Headquarters: Toowoomba, Queensland, Australia; Level 1/5 Keefe St; Toowoomba QLD 4350
- Circulation: 22,808 Monday-Friday; 30,270 Saturday
- Website: thechronicle.com.au

The Toowoomba Chronicle is a daily newspaper serving Toowoomba, the Lockyer Valley and Darling Downs regional areas in Queensland, Australia.

As of 2016, the newspaper is owned by News Corp Australia, and forms part of their Regional Media network.

In 2008, the audited circulation of The Toowoomba Chronicle was 22,808 Monday to Friday and 30,270 on Saturday.

== History ==
The Darling Downs Gazette, founded at Drayton by Arthur Sidney Lyon, began publication in a wooden shanty on 10 June 1858. It moved to the burgeoning town of Toowoomba and merged with The Chronicle in 1922. The Chronicle, founded by Darius Hunt, began as a fourpenny weekly on 4 July 1861 in a coachbuilder's shop in James Street. On 4 February 1876, William Henry Groom became sole proprietor, beginning nearly half a century of family control of a newspaper that he transformed into a powerful and persuasive political weapon.

Archibald Meston was one of the editors.

In 1922 the Dunn family acquired the Gazette and the two newspapers were amalgamated as the Toowoomba Chronicle and Darling Downs Gazette. The combined newspaper was published first on 2 October 1922. On 20 October 1969 The Chronicle format was changed from broadsheet to tabloid. The Chronicle and the Downs Star merged on 1 October 1970 under a new company Toowoomba Newspapers Pty Ltd. The newspaper was relaunched as Toowoomba's Mail in September 2003.

In 1988, Australian Provincial Newspapers Ltd (APN) acquired a 50% share in Toowoomba Newspapers.

== Notable breaking stories ==
=== Encores owner named in alleged sex scandal ===
The Toowoomba Chronicle reported on breakthrough claims regarding a previous Toowoomba Grammar School teacher’s relationship with her student. The alleged private school sex scandal was identified between a prominent teacher and business woman, and former student. The student alleged that this long-running sexual relationship started when he was thirteen years old and the teacher was 29. Whilst the teacher has denied these claims, she was sued for more than $1 million and private notes between the pair were used in court as evidence.

=== AFP corruption scandal ===
Reporting on the “biggest corruption scandal to hit the national police force in decades”, The Toowoomba Chronicle covered the dismissal of two senior Australian Federal Police officers. This “Sydney Mafia” scandal saw The Chronicle follow accusations of fraud. In this case, the story surrounded the inappropriate use of Australian Federal Police credit cards to buy goods for personal use including white goods, such as televisions and Xboxes. It broke news of alleged use of police vehicles for personal reasons. and revealed that thirty nine Australian Federal Police members have been suspended in the last two years and 22 Australian Federal Police officers have been fired.

=== Buried treasure ===
In 2018, The Toowoomba Chronicle broke the news that there more than 5,600 coins had been unearthed at a worksite. The reason for the buried treasure was reported as a result of a family that fled Germany due to religious discrimination and stored it for safekeeping.

== Historical archives ==
Being founded in 1922, the Toowoomba Chronicle’s previous publications include many articles that illustrate the historical progression of the city of Toowoomba. As such, archives are captured of previously published newspapers to encapsulate the city’s history. Here, in excess of 1.5 million negatives that were published in the Toowoomba Chronicle (from 1953 - 2002) and 37,000 editions of the newspaper (from 1861 - 2009) are stored in the University of Southern Queensland. These can be accessed by contacting the Regional Council Local History Library.

Trove has also recently added over sixteen years of The Toowoomba Chronicle’s previous publications in digitised form to their library. This was facilitated by a partnership between the National Library of Australia and the State Library of Queensland. The Trove also holds The Toowoomba Chronicle’s articles that were published from 1861 -1902.

These archived articles draw light to significant moments in Toowoomba’s history, such as the Great Depression Camp for unemployed men. A saved June 1931 publication provides a photograph of the camp’s setting, which features a tent that was received by the camp from the Toowoomba Girl Guides. The location of the camps are also provided by archives from The Chronicle.

=== Historical exhibitions ===
In celebration of the newspaper’s one hundred and fiftieth birthday, an exhibition titled “Toowoomba Through The Chronicle Lens” at the Cobb+Co Museum was built and marketed. This featured the championed Walkley Award winning image by The Chronicle’s Photographer Nev Madsen that illustrates a flood rescue scene. This Chronicle photograph also received a Best Community and Regional Photography category award. This exhibition also featured other pieces of The Chronicle’s history, with previous Chronicle photographers: Dave Noonan, Bev Lacey and Kevin Farmer’s images on display for the exhibition’s spectators. These works included an elephant race, a man comforting a sick horse and a car that drove off a bridge while towing a caravan. These images that resonated with The Toowoomba Chronicle’s audiences over time were selected as highlights of the exhibition.

== Circulation and distribution ==
The Toowoomba Chronicle is available via print edition, desktop format, mobile format and a digital edition. Readers can subscribe to receive one of three different packages, namely: Full Digital Access, Weekend Paper Delivery or a 7-Day Paper Delivery. Payments for these are received on a weekly basis by The Chronicle.

=== Social media ===
On social media outlet Facebook, the Chronicle’s stories are also circulated. During the year of 2020, the most distributed post about Prince Charles and Camilla reached 1.4 million people, achieved 900 reactions and over 1,100 comments.

On Instagram, The Toowoomba Chronicle run under the handle @twbachronicle. Their content includes a summary post of their "top stories" that are released frequently to break news in time to their followers. The account is normally related to community news. Their top engaging posts are regarding school formals. The Instagram account also draws attention to social issues, such as the acknowledgement of R U OK? Day. The account has a following of approximately 4,531.

=== Launch of app ===
The Toowoomba Chronicle can also be reached on via an app. Released on 20 August 2015, the free application displays news, with a similar layout to the website. APN Newspapers describes this medium as a way to “bring all the news that matters in your community” to a mobile phone or tablet format.

=== Launch of updated website ===
During October 2020, The Toowoomba Chronicle re-launched their website. This update was made with hopes to create a “faster, cleaner and more enhanced user experience”. With this website renewal, the navigation bar was placed at the front, with local news placed first. Along with this, there is a drop down bar for different subject matters that are covered by The Toowoomba Chronicle. A link to the daily edition of the newspaper is also provided on the top left of the home page, where subscribers can access their rewards without Courier-Mail. The Chronicle has described the reason for this modernisation to be a result of “extensive research” and a product of feedback from their tabloid subscribers around the nation.

== Contributors ==
=== Current Contributors ===
Name	Title
Morgan Burley	Reporter
John Heeney	Photographer
Jason Gibbs	Sports Editor
Tom Gillespie	Journalist
Peter Hardwick	Court Reporter
Meghan Harris	Digital Producer
Susan Hartland	Designer
Will Hunter	Deputy Editor
Neville Madsen	Photographer
Kate McCormack	Journalist
Rhylea Millar	Journalist
Michael Nolan	Crime Reporter
Jarrad Potter	Journalist
Sean Teuma	Sports Reporter

=== Previous notable contributors ===
Name	Title
Steve Elwell	Editor for 40 years

== Digitisation ==
The paper has been digitised as part of the Australian Newspapers Digitisation Program of the National Library of Australia.

== See also ==
- List of newspapers in Australia
