= The North Australian =

The North Australian may refer to:

- The North Australian (Queensland), a newspaper published in Queensland in the 1860s
- The North Australian (Northern Territory), a newspaper published in the Northern Territory in the 1880s
