= Robert Byrne (Australian politician) =

Australian politician

Robert Byrne (1821 – 24 March 1909) was a politician in colonial Victoria (Australia) and Treasurer of Victoria September 1869 to 21 January 1870.

Byrne was born in Waterford, Ireland, the son of Robert Byrne. He left Ireland for New York City in 1848, and settled there, carrying on the business of general auctioneer in that city as well as in Boston. Towards the end of 1852 he left America for Victoria, arriving in Melbourne. In February 1853, he commenced auctioneering at Sandridge, now called Port Melbourne, and represented the district in the Melbourne Corporation prior to its being constituted a separate municipality.

At the general election of 1864 Byrne contested Sandridge for a seat in the Victorian Legislative Assembly in the Liberal interest against the Hon. David Moore, but was defeated by three votes, and was unsuccessful on petition. Shortly afterwards he was returned for Crowlands by a very large majority. In 1869, when Sir James McCulloch went outside the House for a Commissioner of Customs, Byrne carried a motion censuring the Government, which was taken by them as a vote of want of confidence, on which they resigned, a new Ministry being formed on 20 September 1869, with the Hon John Alexander MacPherson as Chief Secretary and Byrne as Treasurer. When, however, the latter sought re-election at the hands of his constituents, he was defeated by George Rolfe, the gentleman to whose appointment he had objected, and retired from office on 21 January 1870, being succeeded by Graham Berry. Byrne did not re-entered public life unsuccessfully contesting the upper house seats of Central Province in 1878, Melbourne Province in 1888, and the lower house seat of Avoca in 1880.

Byrne died in Richmond, Victoria on 24 March 1909 aged 88 years.
