= Trawalla =

- Town
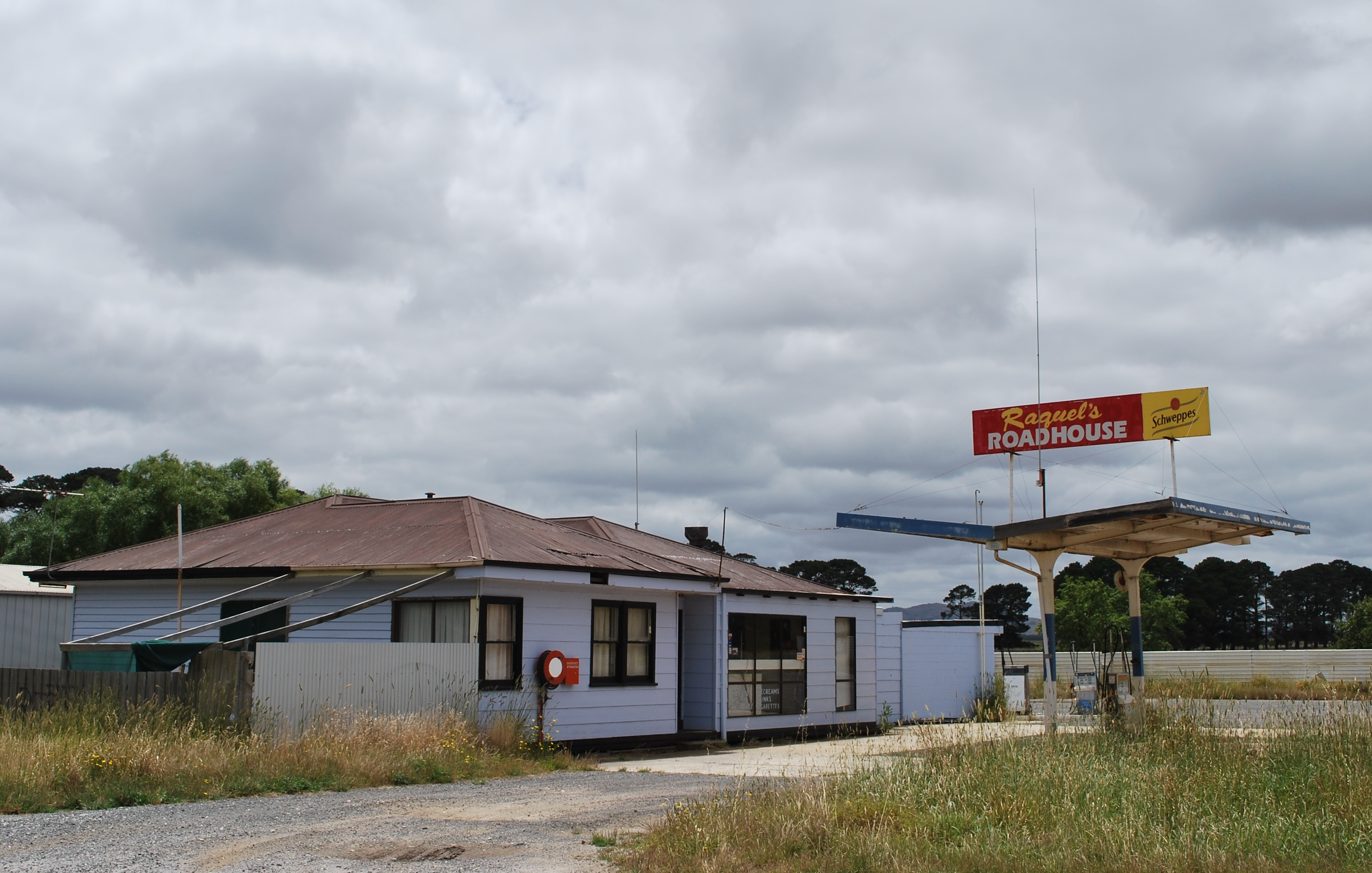
- Closed roadhouse on the Western Highway, 2008

- Coordinates: 37°26′S 143°28′E
- Country: Australia
- State: Victoria
- LGA: Pyrenees Shire
- Location: 154 km (96 mi) W of Melbourne; 41 km (25 mi) W of Ballarat; 52 km (32 mi) E of Ararat; 48 km (30 mi) S of Avoca
- Established: 1839

Government
  - State electorate: Ripon
  - Federal division: Wannon

Population
  - Total: 141 (2016 census)
- Postcode: 3373

Trawalla is a town in central Western Victoria, Australia, located on the Western Highway, 41 kilometres (25 mi) west of Ballarat and 154 kilometres (96 mi) west of Melbourne, in the Shire of Pyrenees. At the 2006 census, Trawalla and the surrounding agricultural area had a population of 224.

Trawalla sits at the headwaters of the Mount Emu Creek where it crosses the Western Highway. The original inhabitants of the area were the Moner Balug clan of the Wadawurrung people (also known as the Wathaurong), who had occupied the land for at least 6,500 years. They called the area Trawalla, which means "wild water" or, possibly, "much rain". Excavations along the Western Highway in 2011-12 located large Aboriginal occupation areas on the alluvial banks of Mount Emu Creek. Material found included flaked and ground stone tools, ochre, and the remnants of hearths, which may have been used for the treatment of wood and animal hides.

== History ==
In 1836, the district was traversed and described by explorer Sir Thomas Mitchell after ascending Mount Cole. The first European settlers to arrive in the area were squatters, Kenneth William Kirkland, his wife Katherine Kirkland (née Hamilton), their daughter Agnes Anna, and Katherine's brothers Robert and James McGregor Hamilton, and they established sheep and cattle grazing runs. Trawalla Station, was established by Hamilton in 1838 and acquired by Adolphus Goldsmith three years later. After passing through several owners, the property was taken over by Rear Admiral Bridges in 1887. It was under his ownership that Trawalla House was constructed.

Trawalla Post Office opened on 3 December 1864 at the time of closer settlement and closed 13 July 1974. The Ararat railway line passes through the town, and Trawalla railway station opened with the line in August 1874. The station was closed on 4 October 1981.

After Bridges' death in 1917, a large part of the Trawalla estate was acquired and subdivided by the Commonwealth Government as part of the soldier settlement scheme. Land was subdivided into 93 allotments, with sizes ranging from 250 acres (100 ha) to 680 acres (280 ha). The land was deemed appropriate for grazing and farming.

The Langi Kal Kal pastoral run was subdivided for the same purpose after World War II in 1948. A local primary school, a roadhouse and the minimum-security prison farm HM Prison Langi Kal Kal, are the focal points of the area.

Trawalla is the birthplace of Australia's ninth Prime Minister James Henry Scullin (1876-1953). His father, John Scullin, had been a miner and later a platelayer on the railways. James Scullin first attended school at Trawalla.
