= Electoral district of Ripon, Hampden, Grenville and Polwarth =

Former electoral district of the Victorian Legislative Council

Coordinates: 38°05′S 143°20′E

Ripon, Hampden, Grenville and Polwarth Victoria—Legislative Council
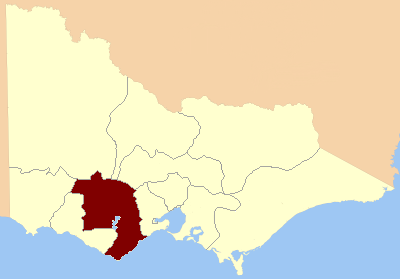
- Location in Victoria
- State: Victoria
- Created: 1851
- Abolished: 1856
- Demographic: Rural

The Electoral district of Ripon, Hampden, Grenville and Polwarth was one of the original sixteen electoral districts of the old unicameral Victorian Legislative Council of 1851 to 1856. Victoria being a colony in Australia at the time.

The district's area was defined as consisting of the four central western Victorian counties of Ripon, Hampden, Grenville and Polwarth.

From 1856 onwards, the Victorian parliament consisted of two houses, the Victorian Legislative Council (upper house, consisting of Provinces) and the Victorian Legislative Assembly (lower house).

== Members ==
One member initially, two from the enlarged Council of 1853.

Member 1	Term		
Adolphus Goldsmith	Nov. 1851 – Nov. 1853^{[r]}	Member 2	Term
John Thompson Charlton	Dec. 1853^{[b]} – Sep. 1854^{[r]}	James Thomson	Aug. 1853 – Feb. 1854^{[r]}
Robert Pohlman	Jan. 1855 – Mar. 1856	Colin Campbell	May 1854 – Mar. 1856

^{r} = resigned
^{b} = by-election

Campbell went on to represent Polwarth, Ripon, Hampden and South Grenville in the Victorian Legislative Assembly from November 1856.

== See also ==
- Parliaments of the Australian states and territories
- List of members of the Victorian Legislative Council
