= Electoral district of Polwarth, Ripon, Hampden and South Grenville =

Former electoral district of the Victorian Legislative Assembly

Coordinates: 38°0′S 143°20′E

Polwarth, Ripon, Hampden and South Grenville Victoria—Legislative Assembly
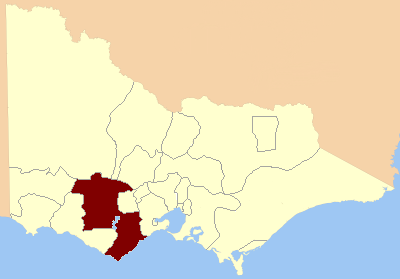
- Location in Victoria
- State: Victoria
- Created: 1856
- Abolished: 1859
- Demographic: Rural

Polwarth, Ripon, Hampden and South Grenville was an electoral district of the Legislative Assembly in the Australian state of Victoria from 1856 to 1859. It was based in western Victoria.

The district of Polwarth, Ripon, Hampden and South Grenville was one of the initial districts of the first Victorian Legislative Assembly, 1856.

In 1859 "Polwarth, Ripon, Hampden and South Grenville" was abolished and new districts of "Grenville" (two members), "Ripon and Hampden" (one member) and "Polwarth and South Grenville" (one member) were created due to the increase of numbers in the Victorian Legislative Assembly.

== Members for Polwarth, Ripon, Hampden and South Grenville ==
Member 1	Term	Member 2	Term
Colin Campbell	Nov. 1856 – Aug. 1859	Jeremiah George Ware	Nov. 1856 – Aug. 1859

Campbell later represented Crowlands from May 1874 to April 1877.
