= Colin Campbell (Australian politician) =

Australian politician

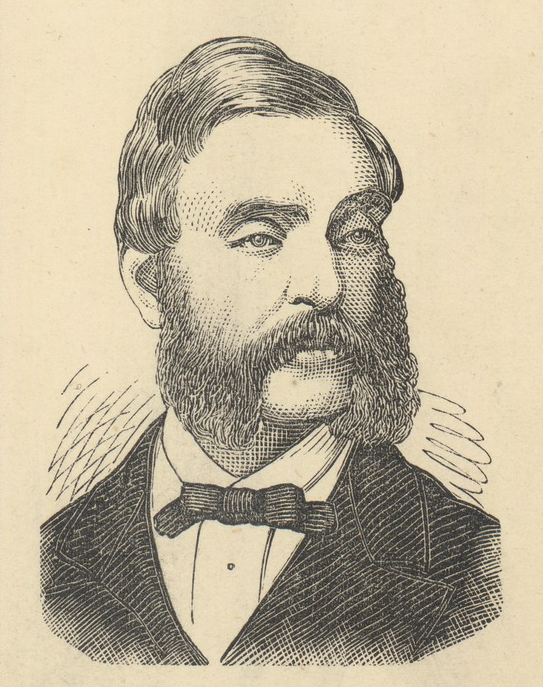
Colin Campbell.

Colin Campbell (21 January 1817 – 28 November 1903) was a pastoralist and politician in colonial Victoria, a member of the Victorian Legislative Council, and later, the Victorian Legislative Assembly.

== Early life ==
Campbell was born in Glasgow, Scotland, the sixth son of Alexander Campbell, a merchant, and Barbara, née Campbell. He was educated at the Edinburgh Academy from 1825 to 1832 and then entered Exeter College, Oxford, gaining a B.A. in 1838.

== Colonial Australia ==
Campbell and his brother Alexander arrived in the Port Phillip District via Hobart in 1839. When Victoria became a separate colony in 1851, Campbell refused a nomination to the Victorian Legislative Council and became a school inspector. On 10 May 1854 Campbell was elected to the unicameral Victorian Legislative Council for Ripon, Hampden, Grenville and Polwarth. Campbell held this position until the original Council was abolished in March 1856. He then represented the Polwarth, Ripon, Hampden, South Grenville in the inaugural Victorian Legislative Assembly from November 1856 to August 1859. Then after unsuccessfully contesting the Assembly seats of Ararat in 1864, South Grant in 1867 and Crowlands in 1868 & 1871, he was elected for Crowlands in May 1874 and held the seat until it was abolished in April 1877.

Campbell died in Hawthorn, Victoria on 28 November 1903. He had married twice: to Frances Elliott Macwhirter (died 1883) on 15 January 1851; and to Emily Ashby Shieffield in 1885 at Brighton.

Victorian Legislative Council
Preceded by James Thomson	Member for Ripon, Hampden, Grenville and Polwarth; 10 May 1854 – March 1856; With: John Charlton 1854; Robert Pohlman 1855–56	Original Council abolished
Victorian Legislative Assembly
New creation	Member for Polwarth, Ripon, Hampden & Sth. Grenville; November 1856 – August 1859; With: Jeremiah George Ware	seat abolished
Preceded by Robert Walker	Member for Crowlands; May 1874 – April 1877; With: John Woods	seat abolished
