= Jeremiah Ware =

Australian politician (1818–1859)

Jeremiah George Ware (21 July 1818 – 22 October 1859) was a pastoralist and politician in colonial Victoria, and a member of the Victorian Legislative Assembly.

== Early life ==
Ware was born in London, England, son of Jeremiah Ware senior, a grazier.

== Career and life ==
Ware and his family emigrated to Van Diemen's Land, then Ware moved to the Port Phillip District around 1838. Ware represented the Polwarth, Ripon, Hampden, South Grenville in the inaugural Victorian Legislative Assembly from November 1856 to August 1859.

Ware married Anne Young McRobie in 1851. He died in Victoria on 22 October 1859.

Victorian Legislative Assembly
New creation	Member for Polwarth, Ripon, Hampden & South Grenville; November 1856 – August 1859; With: Colin Campbell	District abolished
