= Katherine Kirkland =

Australian colonist, squatter and memoirist

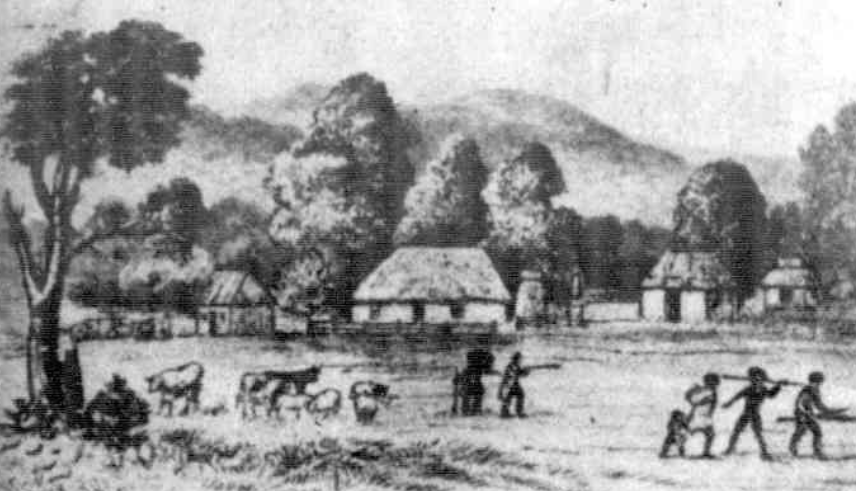
- Home in 1839 in Trawalla
- Born: Katherine Hamilton; 23 February 1808; Glasgow, Lanarkshire, Scotland
- Died: 10 June 1892; Liverpool, Merseyside, England
- Occupation: settler
- Known for: her diary
- Spouse: Kenneth William Kirkland
- Children: three

Katherine Kirkland (23 February 1808 – 10 June 1892) was an Australian colonist, squatter and memoirist who was born in Glasgow. She is known for the accounts she wrote of her few years in Australia when she was the first European woman at Trawalla near Beaufort, Victoria.

== Life ==
Kirkland was born in 1808 in Glasgow. Her parents were Agnes Anna (born Trokes) and Archibald Hamilton. She, her new husband and daughter, and two of her brothers James and Robert, set sail on the Renown for Australia. Her husband, Kenneth Kirkland, had worked for the family sugar refining business but he had lost patience with the owner (who was his elder brother).

When they arrived in Hobart in Tasmania, the men went to obtain a farm at Port Phillip and they made their choice in October 1838. She passed her time on a farm picking up the basic skills of husbandry. After making substantial purchases they set off for Trawalla, Victoria at the beginning of 1839. They were early colonists and life was tough. The final journey started with crossing the Bass Strait and ended with five loaded dreys. The men walked beside for the last seventy miles from Geelong. Katherine travelled with assorted livestock at her feet in the spring cart. She was one of the first European woman in the area. There was no home and one of the early tasks was to construct a hut. The previous settlers on their land had left because of the aboriginals. She was served bread baked in ashes and wrote in her journal of how she was disappointed by the men's manners and appearance. They had servants but they resisted any criticism, by leaving.

In September 1839, she was in Melbourne where her son was born. She returned to their farm where her own duties included the dairy. On New Years Day in 1840, they celebrated Hogmanay in the heat of a summers day. They ate kangaroo soup followed by roast turkey, boiled mutton, parrot pie and a desert of plum pudding. She later noted that they ate well while in Trawalla. She and her family stayed in Trawalla for two years. They left after her husband's family made issue with Kenneth doing manual tasks. They had a brief spell elsewhere and then they were in Melbourne where Katherine opened a school and Kenneth was employed as a court registrar. He sold his land and Katherine and the children sailed for Glasgow in 1841.

In 1842, she publish anonymously an account of her life in Australia. It was serialised in the Scottish weekly Chambers's Edinburgh Journal in June and in July. In that July, Kenneth was declared insolvent in Melbourne. He returned to Scotland and it was believed that he later left for British Columbia. In 1845, her journal was published as "Life in the Bush".

Kirkland died in 1892 in Liverpool, England. There is a monument in Beaufort, Victoria to the early settlers in the area.
