= John Thompson Charlton =

Australian politician (1826–1878)

John Thompson Charlton, also known as John Charlton Thompson (1826 – 26 November 1878) was a politician in colonial Victoria (Australia), a member of the Victorian Legislative Council.

== Early life ==
Charlton was born in Hull, Yorkshire, England, the son of Thomas Charlton and his wife Rebecca, née Thompson and was baptised on 21 June 1826. Charlton married Hannah Elizabeth Breeze on 30 September 1850 at St Mary-at-Lambeth, Surrey, and the couple emigrated to Australia.

== Career in Australia ==
Charlton was elected member of the Victorian Legislative Council for Ripon, Hampden, Grenville and Polwarth in December 1853, a position he held until he resigned in September 1854. The resignation was probably linked to his insolvency proceedings in November 1854 as Members of Parliament could not be bankrupt.

Charlton became a surveyor, he laid out and named the town of Bundaberg in Queensland in 1870. He was also editor of The Queensland Times using the name John Charlton Thompson.

Victorian Legislative Council
Preceded by Adolphus Goldsmith	Member for Ripon, Hampden, Grenville and Polwarth; December 1853 – September 1854; With: James Thomson 1853–1854; Colin Campbell 1854	Succeeded by Robert Pohlman
