= Trawalla Homestead =

Historic homestead in Victoria, Australia

Trawalla
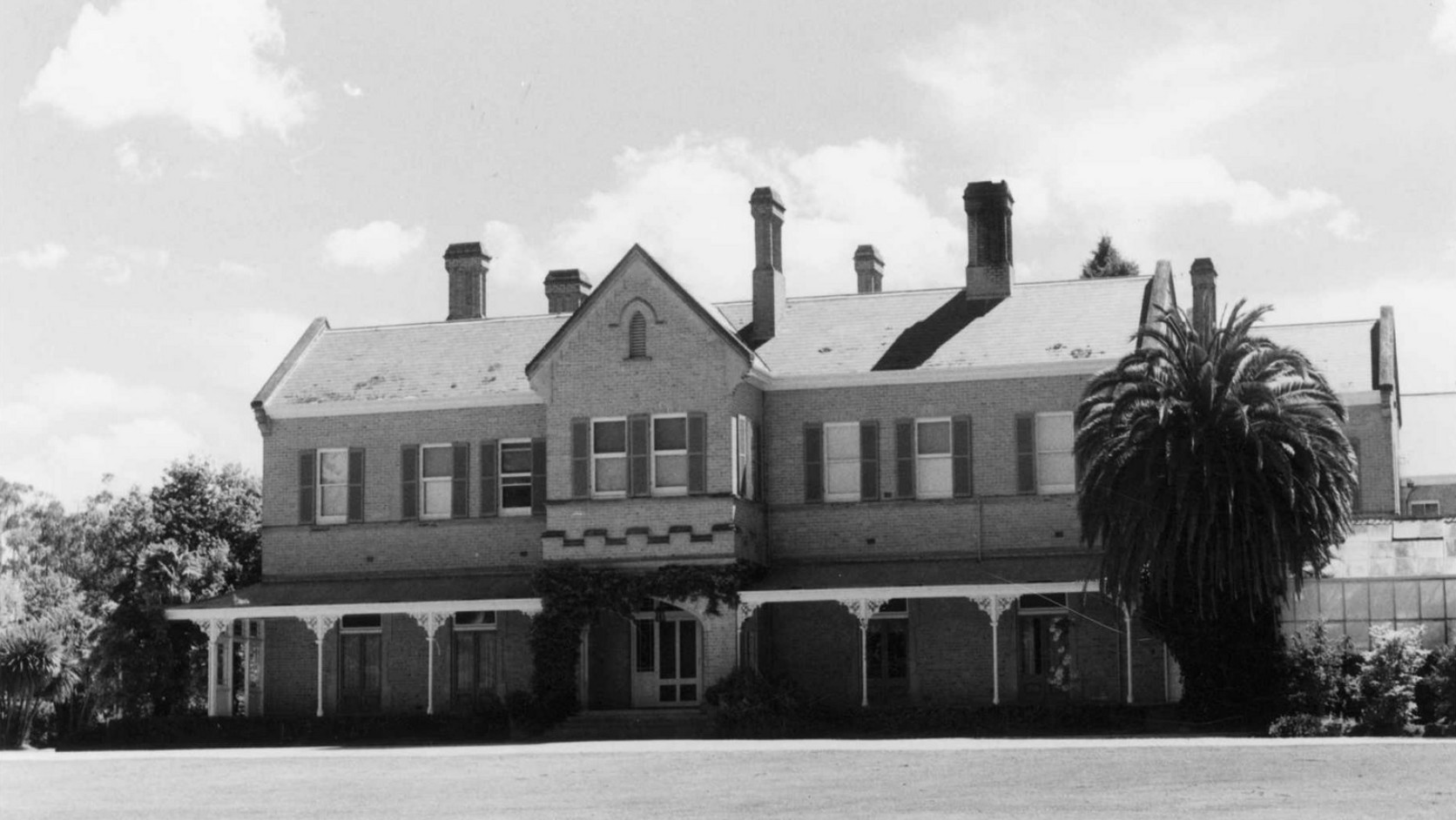
- Trawalla Homestead

- Location in Pyrenees Shire, Victoria
- 37°28′29″S 143°27′47″E
- Type: Homestead, associated built facilities and grounds
- Location: Trawalla, Victoria, Australia
- Nearest city: Ballarat

History
- Built: 1891
- Built for: Walter Bridges

Site notes
- Architect(s): James & Piper

Trawalla is a historic pastoral property in the Western District of Victoria, Australia. The property was first settled in 1839 and has been associated with several prominent pastoral families, including the Kirklands, Goldsmiths, Simsons, Wilsons, Bridges and Mackenzies. Its present homestead and garden largely date from the 1890s, while an earlier homestead and associated buildings dating from the 1840s also survive. The property is notable for its extensive nineteenth-century garden, numerous pastoral outbuildings and its association with several generations of prominent Victorian pastoralists.

== History ==
Trawalla was first settled in 1839 by Scottish pastoralist Kenneth Kirkland, who established the property in partnership with John and Robert Hamilton. The Hamilton brothers had arrived in Hobart aboard the Renown in 1838, while Kirkland and his wife Katharine subsequently travelled to the Port Phillip District. After acquiring livestock, the partners crossed Bass Strait by ship to Geelong and proceeded into the Western District. Katharine Kirkland later published an account of her experiences in the colony, "Life in the Bush", which appeared in Edinburgh in 1845.

In 1841 Captain Adolphus Goldsmith, who later became a member of the first Victorian Legislative Council, purchased Trawalla from the Kirklands. Goldsmith subsequently sold the property to John Simson, who, together with his brother Robert, controlled about 100,000 acres (40,470 ha) in the region, including Carngham and Langi Kal Kal. Trawalla was later acquired by Samuel Wilson.

=== Bridges ownership ===
Wilson eventually gave Trawalla, then comprising about 42,000 acres (16,997 ha), to his daughter Annie following her marriage to Rear Admiral Walter Bridges in 1888. Under the Bridges, the property underwent substantial development. They constructed artificial waterways, brick-lined drains and extensive gardens, while a summerhouse was established on a hill overlooking the homestead.

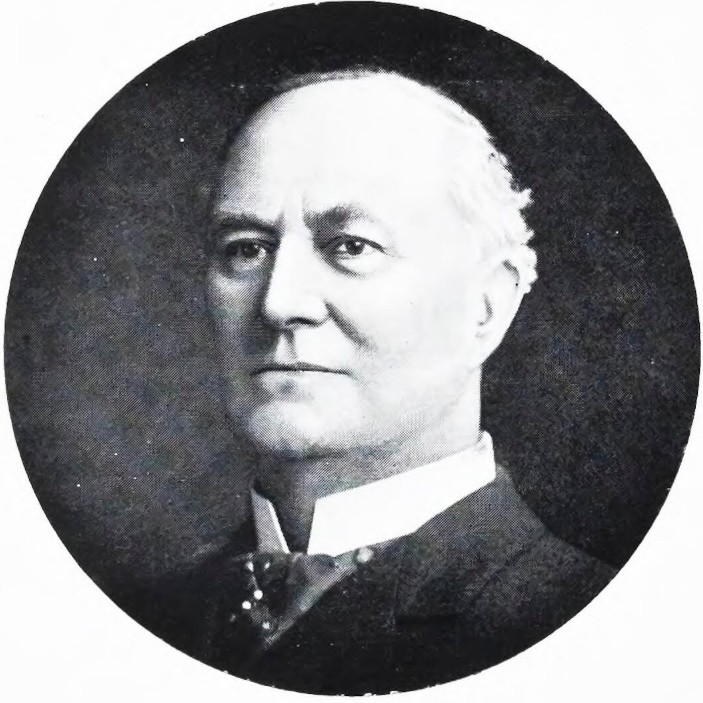
Rear-Admiral Walter Bridges

The principal Trawalla homestead was constructed in 1891 for the Bridges. Designed by Ballarat architects James & Piper, it was built from red brick manufactured and fired on the property. The associated stables were constructed at the same time. The residence became the centrepiece of an extensive pastoral complex which incorporated numerous service and garden buildings.

The Bridges also constructed a small red-brick church at the northern end of the property. The building was deliberately left unconsecrated so that people of different religious denominations could worship there.

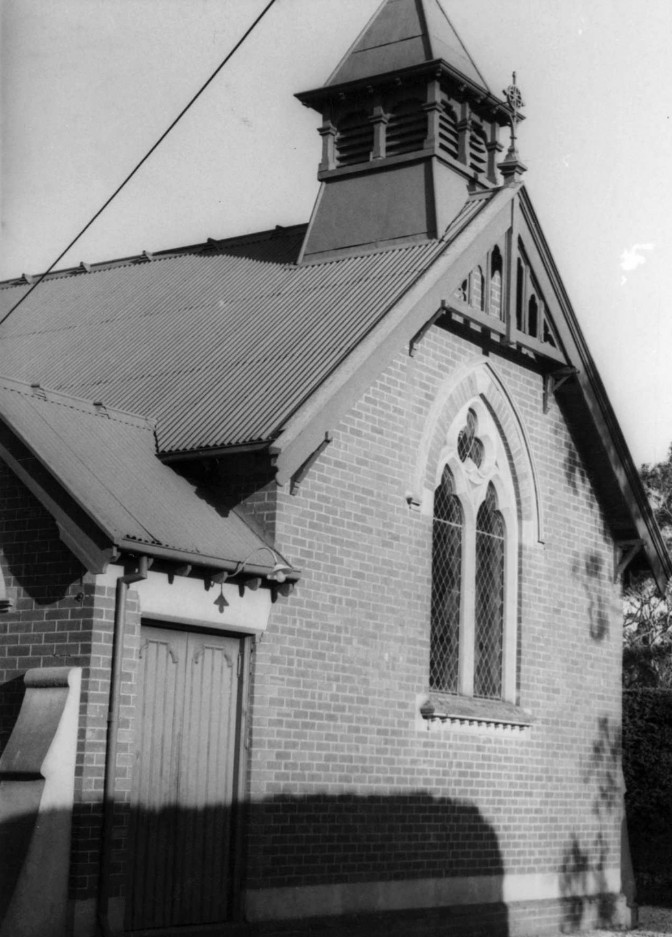
The non-denominational church on the property

The property retained an earlier homestead dating from the 1840s. Partly constructed from timber slabs, the building retains its original bark roof beneath a later corrugated-iron roof. Other buildings on the property include the grooms' quarters, a former schoolhouse, dog kennels, a former chicken house, a former gas plant room, a fruit and vegetable house and other gardens structures.

The Trawalla estate underwent subdivision during the early twentieth century. In 1909, a subdivisional sale by tender disposed of 5,244 acres (2,122 ha) at an average price of £8 4s per acre, with local farmers purchasing most of the land and farmers from the Wimmera also acquiring substantial portions.

=== Mackenzie ownership and garden ===
Following the death of Admiral Bridges in 1917, a substantial part of Trawalla was acquired by the government for the Soldier Settlement Scheme. The land was subsequently divided into 93 allotments ranging from approximately 250 to 680 acres (101 to 275 ha). The remaining homestead portion was offered at public auction in January 1921. The Horsham Times reported that Commander Harry Ponsonby Mackenzie, formerly of the Royal Navy, purchased the homestead portion for £71,000. The portion comprised approximately 9,000 acres (3,642 ha). Mackenzie had recently married Gladys Weatherly, whose father William Weatherly had accumulated considerable wealth through pastoral interests and an investment in a silver mine at Broken Hill. Weatherly had died in 1914, and Gladys used part of her inheritance to acquire Trawalla in 1921. She and Commander Harry 'Max' Mackenzie subsequently made the property their home.

The successive ownership of Trawalla by Bridges and Mackenzie led to a local joke that the property had effectively been under Royal Navy command for about 60 years, with Trawalla affectionately referred to as "HMS Trawalla". Harry Mackenzie died in 1948, while Gladys continued to live at Trawalla until her death in 1966.

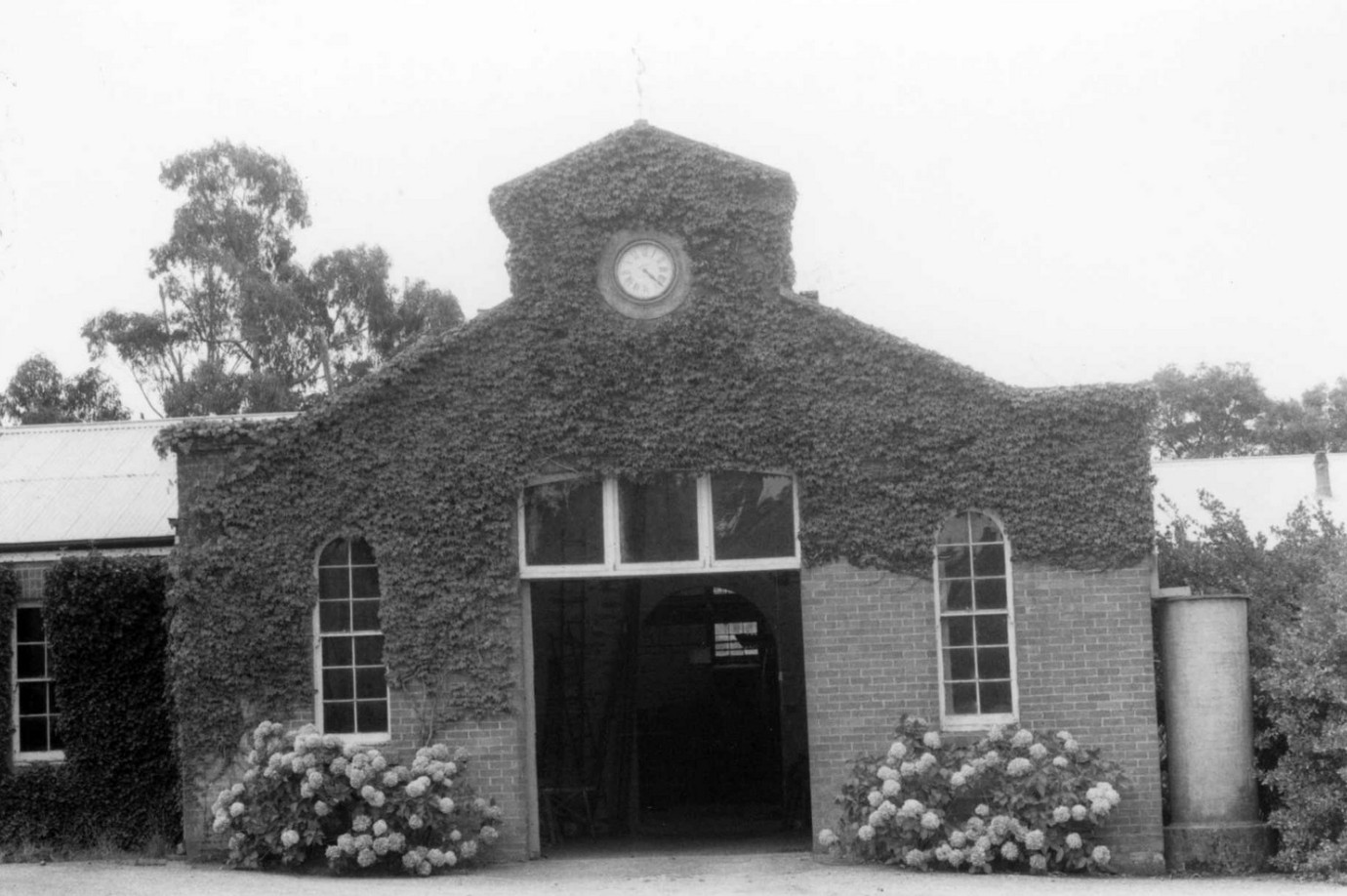
The stables

Gladys Mackenzie was particularly interested in the gardens, especially daffodils. She propagated a number of unusual varieties, including cultivars named Trawalla and Alastair, the latter after her eldest son. During her residence, the large homestead required a substantial household staff, including 6 domestic staff and 6 gardeners, as well as rabbiters, a full-time tree planter and numerous farm workers.

The garden at Trawalla developed principally during the 1890s and has been maintained since that period. It incorporates elements characteristic of large nineteenth-century pastoral gardens, including open lawns, carriage drives, a formal parterre, lakes and long axial views. A number of mature specimen trees, shrubs and woodland plantings from the late nineteenth and early twentieth centuries also survive.

The garden includes a range of structures associated with large nineteenth-century estates, including a timber pergola described as one of the longest in Victoria, a metal catenary frame and a working conservatory. Water features and the site's undulating terrain were incorporated into the design to create both close and distant views.

The vegetable garden and tennis court were designed by Paul Bangay.

=== Later ownership ===
The estate was sold in 2012 to Colin and Heather Richmond, a farming family from Little River. The Richmonds subsequently acquired a further 1,100 acres (445 ha) adjoining the property, bringing the total area to approximately 9,800 acres (3,970 ha).

== See also ==
- Mawallok
- Ercildoune
