= Robert Pohlman =

Australian politician

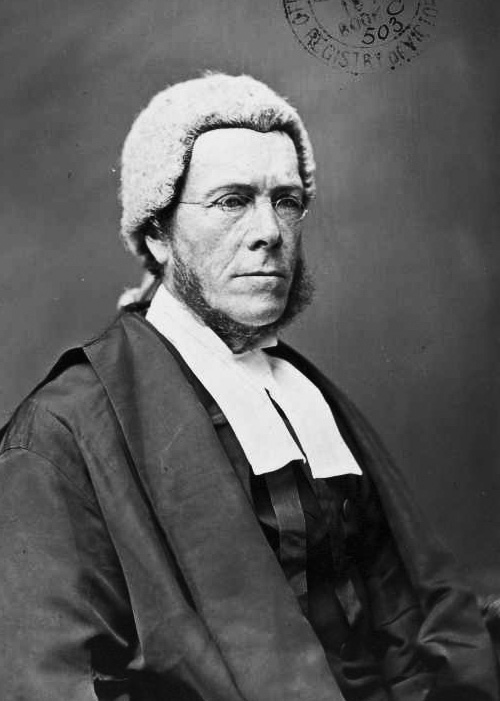
Portrait of Pohlman in his judicial wig and robes, taken in 1872.

Robert Williams Pohlman (March 1811 – 6 December 1877) was an English-born Australian lawyer and judge.

Pohlman was born in London, the son of son of John George Pohlman and Annie Hamilton, née Williams, his wife . Little is known of his early life, other than that he studied law after finishing school, was admitted as a barrister in England, and as an advocate in Scotland in 1839.

Pohlman and his younger brother Frederick emigrated to Australia, arriving at Port Phillip in October 1840. The following year the brothers purchased a portion of Darlington Station near Kyneton, north-west of Melbourne, where they ran several thousand sheep.

After the creation of the Supreme Court of New South Wales for the District of Port Phillip, and the appointment of Justice John Willis as Resident Judge, Pohlman was admitted to the local bar, one of the first six barristers admitted in Port Phillip (along with Edward Brewster, Redmond Barry, James Croke, Archibald Cuninghame and James Murray). He maintained a private practice for the next five years. Brewster, Cuninghame and Murray did not remain in Port Phillip for long, however, and most of the legal work in Melbourne during this time was performed by Pohlman and Barry, until they were joined later by William Stawell, Edward Eyre Williams and Sidney Stephen. Pohlman had a similar background to these other lawyers, and together "they acted as an informal Senior Common Room in the 1840s, dining and socialising together and generally supportive of their own brand of legal manners." However, Pohlman gradually received less work than the other four leaders of the bar.

In addition to his private practice, Pohlman was appointed the Commissioner of Insolvent Estates in 1846, and the Master in Equity in July 1851. Pohlman was selected by Lieutenant-Governor La Trobe on 31 October 1851 to fill one of the nominee positions in the Victorian Legislative Council when that body was created; he was sworn-in in November 1851. He continued as a member until resigning in October 1854, but was elected to the Council for Ripon, Hampden, Grenville and Polwarth at the uni-cameral January 1855 election. He was a candidate for South Western Province at the March 1856 election, but was not elected.

Pohlman had a long interest in education. He was the first and only chairman of the Denominational Board of Education from 1848 until 1862, when that body merged with the national board. After the University of Melbourne was created in 1853, Pohlman was one of the inaugural members of the University Council.

Pohlman was twice an acting judge of the Supreme Court of Victoria, from April 1859 until April 1861, and again from June through December in 1871, while William Stawell was absent with illness.

In 1869 Pohlman was appointed President of the newly-formed Old Colonists' Association of Victoria, and laid the foundation stone at the Old Colonists' Homes in North Fitzroy on 1 July 1870. A street in the village is named after him.

Pohlman died in 1877 at his home in Punt Road, Richmond and was buried at Melbourne General Cemetery.

A street in the Canberra suburb of Latham is also named after him.

Victorian Legislative Council
New creation	Nominated Member; October 1851 – October 1854	Succeeded by Charles Pasley
Preceded by John Charlton	Member for Ripon, Hampden, Grenville & Polwarth; January 1855 – March 1856; With: Colin Campbell	Original Council abolished
