= Ercildoune, Victoria =

Ercildoune
- Town
- Coordinates: 37.3982°S 143.6361°E
- Country: Australia
- State: Victoria
- LGA: City of Ballarat

Government
  - State electorate: Ripon
  - Federal division: Ballarat, Wannon

Population
  - Total: 90 (2021 census)
- Postcode: 3352
Localities around Ercildoune
	Waubra
Glenbrae	Ercildoune	Learmonth
	Burrumbeet

Ercildoune is a locality in western Victoria, Australia. The locality is noted for the significant and unusual historic buildings and gardens found at the Ercildoune Homestead. At the 2021 census, Ercildoune and the surrounding area had a population of 90.

== History ==
Ercildoun (sic). (Note: Variances exist in the spelling of the homestead's name between the Victorian Heritage Register and the Victorian branch of the National Trust.) is a large Victorian-era homestead built in 1838–1839 by Scottish-born Thomas Learmonth and his brother Somerville, and was named after an old keep on the Scottish border, associated with an ancestor of the Learmonth family. The property was purchased by Sir Samuel Wilson in about 1873, for c. A£250,000. He was responsible for adding to the existing building, which is a large stone mansion in the Scottish Baronial style, with crow-stepped gabled wings and castellated parapets. Ercildoun is one of the most important historic homesteads in Victoria, and one of the earliest surviving buildings.
