= Ercildoun (homestead) =

Homestead in the Grampians region, Victoria, Australia

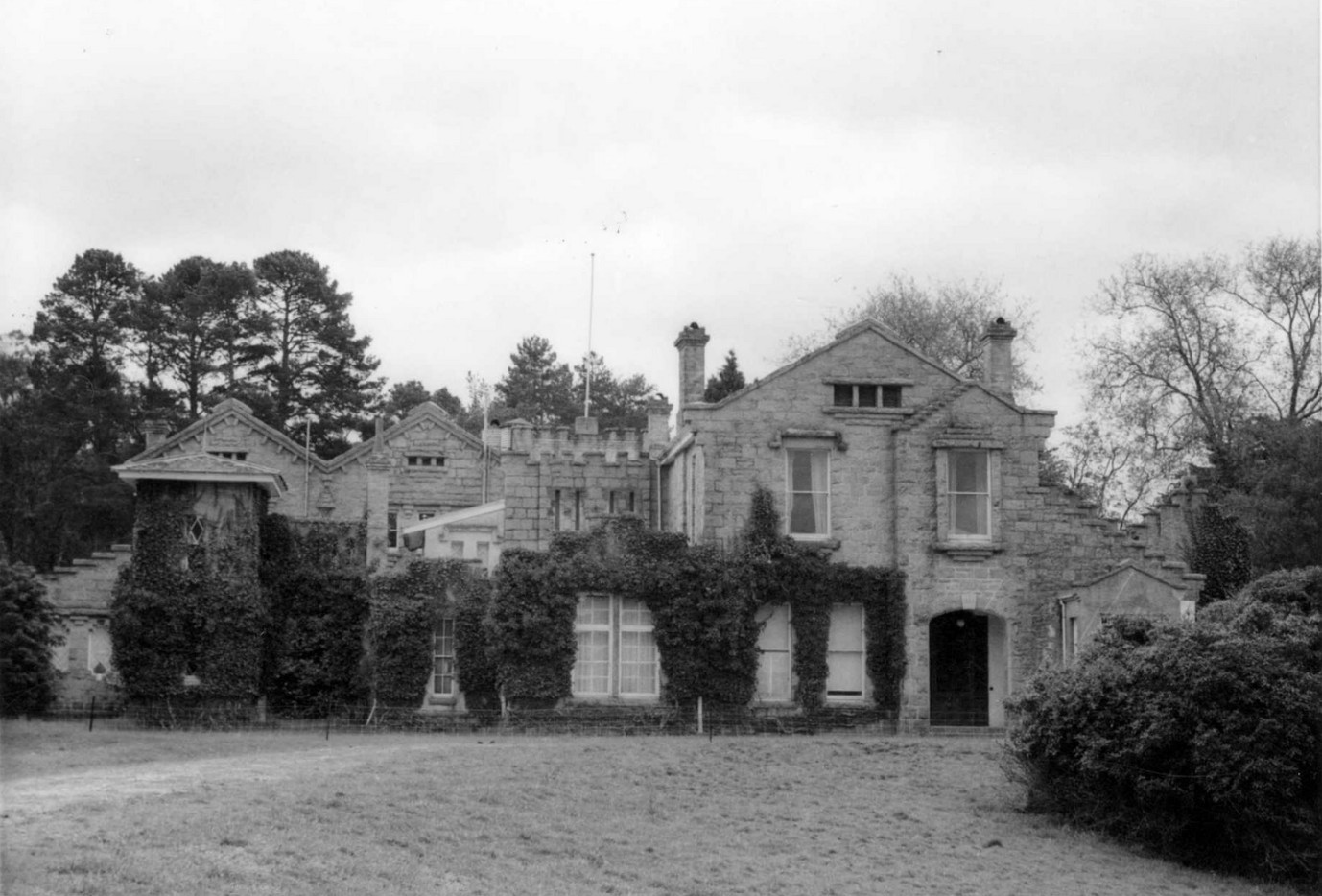
- Ercildoune Homestead, 1965

- Location within Victoria
- Etymology: Gaelic: Arciol Dun (lookout hill or keep, in Scotland)

General information
- Status: Completed
- Type: Homestead
- Architectural style: Scottish baronial revival
- Location: Ercildoune, Grampians region, Victoria, Australia
- Coordinates: 37°24′49″S 143°36′52″E
- Year built: 1854–1866
- Groundbreaking: 1838 (settled)
- Completed: 1866; 160 years ago
- Client: Thomas and Somerville Learmonth
- Owner: Learmonth brothers (1838–1873); Sir Samuel Wilson (1873–1920); Sir Alan Currie and family (1920–1999); John and Christine Dever (1999–2014); unknown (since 2014– )

Dimensions
- Other dimensions: Homestead: 9 bedrooms, ballroom, library; Outbuildings: various cottages, maid's and shearers' quarters, stables and other yards; Extensive gardens

Technical details
- Material: Bluestone
- Floor count: 2
- Grounds: 73 ha (180 acres)

Victorian Heritage Register
- Official name: Ercildoun
- Type: Registered place
- Criteria: A, B, C, D, E, F, G
- Designated: 9 October 1974
- Reference no.: H0313
- Heritage overlay on.: HO23
- Categories: Farming and Grazing; Residential buildings (private); Parks, Gardens and Trees; Utilities - Electricity; Recreation and Entertainment

Register of the National Estate
- Official name: Ercildoune Homestead
- Type: Defunct register
- Designated: 21 March 1978
- Reference no.: 4060

Ercildoun (Note: Ercildoun was originally spelt without the added ‘e’. Sir Samuel Wilson added on the ‘e’ as he wanted an even number of letters on the entrance gates to the property. For the purposes of this article, the original spelling is adopted. Variances exist in the spelling of the homestead's name between various sources, and sometimes, within the source itself. The locale adopted the latter spelling.) is a pastoral property and homestead, located near the locale of Ercildoune, in the Pyrenees Shire local government area, in the Grampians region of Victoria, Australia. Settled from c. 1834, the pastoral property and homestead, completed in the Scottish baronial revival style, are historically significant as being one of the earliest and foremost substantial homesteads built in Victoria following European settlement.

The property was added to the Victorian Heritage Register on 9 October 1974 in recognition of its historical, architectural, aesthetic, archaeological and scientific significance; having been added to a non-statutory list by the Victorian branch of the National Trust on 20 June 1974; and was added, on 21 March 1978, to the now defunct Register of the National Estate.

== History ==
Thomas and Somerville Learmonth founded Ercildoun as a pastoral run in 1838. The brothers had been part of an unsuccessful exploration mission into the interior of the Port Phillip District in 1837, and embarked on another reconnaissance in 1838, which resulted in them running approximately 2,000 sheep over lands extending from Mt Buninyong to the foothills around where the township of Learmonth is now located, near Lake Burrumbeet.

The brothers constructed a number of buildings and structures, and a cemetery at Ercildoun. They built the early stages of the homestead in c. 1854 and many other outbuildings, and laid the foundations of what was to become a grand and elaborate garden and parkland. They established Ercildoun as a centre for merino wool production and breeding with a reputation unsurpassed in Colonial Victoria.

In 1873, the 11,000-hectare (27,000-acre) Ercildoun pastoral run was sold to Sir Samuel Wilson for c.A£250,000. Wilson's achievements at Ercildoun included extensive additions to the homestead, the development of the garden to include the long entry avenue of alternating Himalayan cedar and Monterey pines, a walled garden, and the establishment of a deer park. He was also involved in the development of one of the first trout hatcheries in Colonial Victoria, and the continued production of fine merino wool.

In 1920 the 3,200-hectare (8,000-acre) property was sold to Major Sir Alan Currie for c. A$100,000. At Ercildoun, Currie installed a hydroelectric scheme, established a renowned horse stud, and continued involvement in the fine merino wool production and fish breeding. Currie died at Ercildoun in 1942, and Lady Currie continued to live there until her death in 1962. Childless, upon her death, the estate went into decline and the homestead was left vacant for many years.

Following subdivision and sale of vast tracts of the extensive pastoral station, in 1999, the remaining 73-hectare (180-acre) property was acquired by John Dever, a Melbourne lawyer, and his wife, Christine, who restored the homestead and gardens, and sold the property in 2014.

== Description ==
Ercildoun is a pastoral property, comprising a range of buildings and elements dating from at least the mid nineteenth century, through to the early twentieth century. The property has the appearance of a small rural settlement, comprising an array of buildings and elements including the homestead, caretaker's residence, manager's residence, gatehouse, garden plantings and structures, cemetery, wind breaks, and a series of farm buildings, including a barn and shearing sheds.

A remarkable artefact that covered the Ercildoun garden well is known as the 'Palestinian Well Head'. It is believed to be approximately 2,000 years old and was possibly smuggled out of Palestine or Egypt. The well head, which was installed at Ercildoun by the Learmonths, has been described as being the colour of desert sand, with a peculiar mottled surface and a texture like marble. The hand wrought iron hoist has been described as being of an ecclesiastical design. The garden includes a large, diverse and unusual range of exotic and native mature trees, shrubs and water plants. The 4,047-square-metre (1-acre) garden is enclosed by a three-metre-high (ten-foot) granite garden wall and decorative wrought iron gate is the only walled garden of this scale in Victoria. Other important garden features include a tennis court built in 1907 for use by Dame Nellie Melba who leased the property for six months, and a low granite garden wall and wrought iron gates bisecting the garden and parkland to the south of the homestead.

Though not currently in operation, the hydroelectric scheme retains its main components, including the dams, holding tank, water race, generator and switchboard. The fish hatchery is believed to be one of the first trout hatcheries in Victoria.

== See also ==
- Trawalla Homestead
- List of historic homesteads in Australia
- Heritage gardens in Australia
- Victorian architecture
