= George Rolfe =

Australian politician

- Born: 1808; Tenterden, Kent, United Kingdom
- Died: 18 December 1871 (aged 62–63); Balaclava, Victoria, Australia

Hon. George Rolfe (1808 – 18 December 1871) M.L.C., was a merchant and politician in the Colony of Victoria (a state of Australia since 1901).

== Early life ==
Rolfe was born in 1808 in Tenterden, Kent, where his father was a prosperous landholder. George became a merchant in London and, after that business failed, he emigrated to South Australia in 1848, arriving in Adelaide on 24 June 1849. He started a partnership in real estate with P. D. Prankerd, which was dissolved in May 1851. He moved to Victoria, arriving in May 1854, and was the founder of one of the leading mercantile firms in Melbourne, Victoria, of that time.

== Political career ==
Rolfe was elected a member of the Legislative Council for North Western Province, from May 1860 to October 1862, and a member for South Western Province January 1867 to March 1867.

On 2 September 1869, Rolfe was appointed Commissioner of Customs in the second McCulloch Government, despite the fact that he was not then a member of either House of Parliament. Robert Byrne moved a motion in the Assembly a few days later, censuring the Premier for having gone outside the House for a colleague. The motion was carried and the Ministry resigned on 20 September. Byrne then became Treasurer in the MacPherson Government, but, on going back to his constituents at Crowlands for re-election following his appointment, was defeated by Rolfe on 5 October 1869.

== Legacy ==
Rolfe was a director of the National Bank of Australia, and was a significant contributor to the foundation of the Alfred Hospital. He was married three times, and had four children from his first marriage. He lived in Balaclava, Victoria and died there on 18 December 1871.
