= Electoral district of Crowlands =

Former electoral district in Victoria, Australia

Coordinates: 36°10′S 143°00′E

Crowlands Victoria—Legislative Assembly
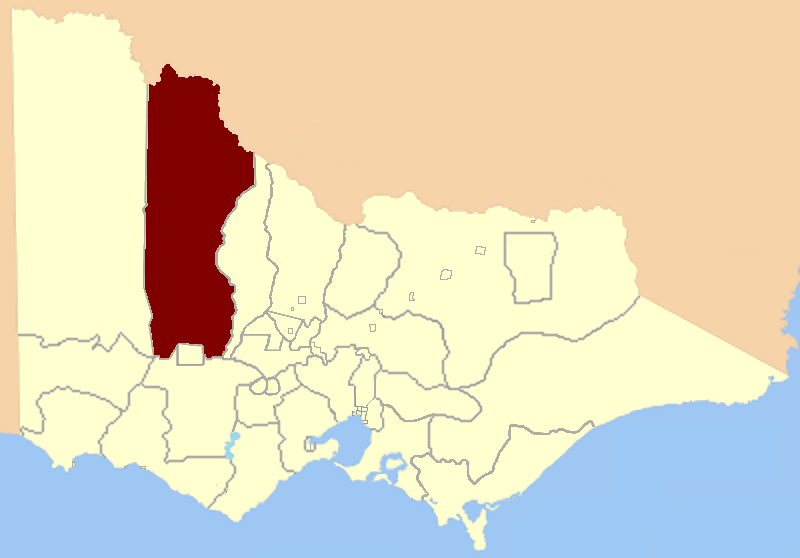
- Location in Victoria
- State: Victoria
- Created: 1859
- Abolished: 1877
- Demographic: Rural

Crowlands was an electoral district of the Legislative Assembly in the Australian colony of Victoria from 1859 to 1877. It was located in north-western Victoria and included the town of Swan Hill.

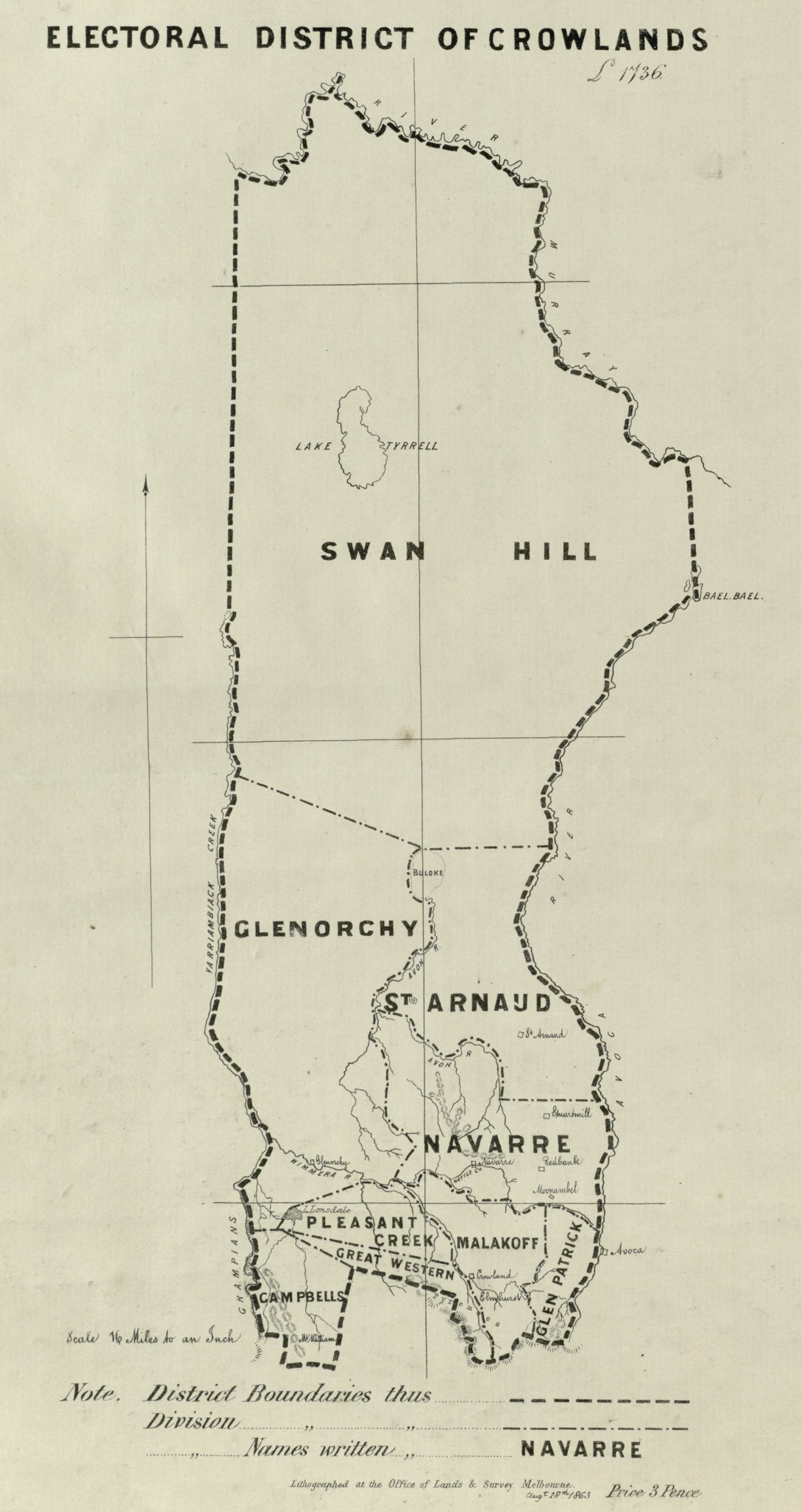
Electoral district of Crowlands, Victoria

The district was defined as being:

Bounded on the west by the Yarriambiack Creek from the junction of the River Wimmera to Lake Corong; thence by a line north to the Murray; again on the west by a tributary of the River Wimmera to its source near Briggs's Bluff in the Grampians; thence southwards by the Grampians range; on the south by the Dividing Range; on the east by the River Avoca and a line north to the Murray; and on the north by the Murray, excepting the country included within the electoral district of Ararat.

== Members ==
2 members
Member 1	Term	Member 2	Term
John Houston	Oct 1859 – Dec 1865	John Woods	Oct 1859 – Aug 1864
John Houston	Oct 1859 – Dec 1865	Ronald Campbell	Nov 1864 – Dec 1865
Robert Byrne	Feb 1866 – Oct 1869	Andrew Love	Feb 1866 – Dec 1867
Robert Byrne	Feb 1866 – Oct 1869	David Blair	Mar 1868 – Jan 1871
George Rolfe	Oct 1869^{[b]} – Jan? 1871	David Blair	Mar 1868 – Jan 1871
Robert Walker	Apr 1871 – Mar 1874	John Woods	Apr 1871 – Apr 1877
Colin Campbell	May 1874 – Apr 1877	John Woods	Apr 1871 – Apr 1877

^{[b]} = by-election

After Crowlands was abolished, John Woods went on to represent the electoral district of Stawell from its creation in 1877 to 1892.
