= Darling Downs Gazette =

Former newspaper in Queensland, Australia

Front page of the first issue of The Darling Downs Gazette and General Advertiser, published on 10 June 1858 in Drayton, Queensland by Arthur Sidney Lyon

The Darling Downs Gazette was a newspaper published from 1848 to 1922 in Drayton and Toowoomba in Queensland, Australia.

== History ==
The Darling Downs Gazette and General Advertiser was founded in 1858 by Arthur Sidney Lyon. The first issue of four pages was published on Thursday 10 June 1858 from Willow Cottage, a wooden shanty, in Drayton.

After two years, it was purchased by W. H. Byers. Later, William Henry Traill was the proprietor for a brief period. While Drayton, being established in 1842, was the first substantial settlement on the Darling Downs, by the 1860s it was clear that it would be overtaken by nearby Toowoomba in size and importance, leading to Byers relocating the Darling Downs Gazette to Toowoomba in 1861.

As the Darling Downs was a rural district occupied by squatters, the newspaper focussed on farming and trade issues. Its politics were aligned with the interests of the squatters (a significant force in early Queensland politics), and lead to the creation of opposition newspapers that represented opposing political interests.

From June 1858 to November 1864 it was published weekly on Thursday. From December 1864 to November 1865 it was published twice a week on Wednesday and Saturday. From November 1865 to September 1868 it was published three times a week on Tuesday, Thursday and Saturday. From September 1868 to March 1879 it reverted twice a week on Wednesday and Saturday (but occasionally published three issues in a week). From April 1879 it became a daily paper published Monday through Saturday.

In 1922 the Dunn family bought the Darling Downs Gazette and amalgamated it with as the Toowoomba Chronicle under the new title Toowoomba Chronicle and Darling Downs Gazette, first published on 2 October 1922.

== Digitisation ==
The paper has been digitised as part of the Australian Newspapers Digitisation Program of the National Library of Australia.

== See also ==
- List of newspapers in Australia
