= Arthur Sidney Lyon =

Australian journalist

Arthur Sidney Lyon (1817–1861), was a journalist and newspaper proprietor in Queensland, Australia. He was known as "the father of the press in colonial Queensland". He was the founder of the Moreton Bay Courier (later Brisbane Courier, now The Courier-Mail) and the Darling Downs Gazette.

== Early life ==
Lyon started his career as a station manager in Moreton Bay (later the Colony of Queensland) in 1842. He managed Henry Stuart Russell's Burrandowan station on the Burnett River.

== Newspaper career ==
He worked on newspapers in Melbourne prior to his arrival in Moreton Bay district. In February 1846 he convened a meeting at the Victoria Hotel in Brisbane for the purpose of establishing a newspaper. He received a number of offers of support at the meeting. When James Swan (later the proprietor of the Courier) arrived soon afterwards with the requisite material, the first paper in the district was started under the title of the Moreton Bay Courier, and our "No. I" made its appearance on 20 June 1846. Mr. Lyon's connection with the newspaper continued for about three years.

In July 1850, he returned to journalism, writing for the Moreton Bay Free Press, a paper which was started as the organ of the party who were at that time anxious to achieve "separation with exiles."

In October 1855, he became the editor of the newspaper North Australian, Ipswich and General Advertiser, the first issue of which was issued on the 2nd of that month. After working for about two years on that newspaper, he had a disagreement with the proprietors and that ended his relationship with the newspaper.

Lyon attempted to start a second paper in Ipswich but decided it would not succeed. He then looked further afield to the Darling Downs, and on 11 June 1858, he published the first issue of the Darling Downs Gazette in Drayton (now a suburb of Toowoomba). A short time subsequently, he became the subject of repeated and virulent paralytic attacks, and he resigned as editor, but continued as proprietor.

== Later life ==
After leaving Drayton he went to live in Cleveland and the southern islands of Moreton Bay where he lived until his death.

He died at Cleveland Point on 22 October 1861 from an inflammation of the abdomen at 44 years of age and was buried at the Cleveland Pioneer Cemetery.

== See also ==
- Journalism in Australia
