= Adolphus Goldsmith =

Australian politician (1798–1876)

Adolphus Goldsmith, also known as Adolphe Goldschmidt, (6 May 1798 – 1876) was a politician in colonial Victoria (Australia), a member of the first Victorian Legislative Council.

Goldsmith was born in London, England, the son of Lion Abraham Goldschmidt and Adelaide (Adelheid) Hertz. Goldsmith arrived in Melbourne on 30 June 1841 aboard the Caroline. Goldsmith acquired the pastoral lease for Trawalla later in 1841. He was appointed a territorial magistrate on 26 March 1844. Goldmith was a member of the Melbourne Club and a friend of Sir Redmond Barry.

Goldsmith was elected to the district of Ripon, Hampden, Grenville and Polwarth in the inaugural Victorian Legislative Council on 6 September 1851. He resigned from the Council in November 1853 and retired to Paris, France, where he died in 1876.

Victorian Legislative Council
New creation	Member for Ripon, Hampden, Grenville & Polwarth; 6 September 1851 – November 1853	Succeeded by John Thompson Charlton
