= North Australian, Ipswich and General Advertiser =

Australian daily newspaper

The North Australian, Ipswich and General Advertiser, 1 January 1856, page 1.

The North Australian, and Queensland General Advertiser, 1 May 1862, page 1 (its first edition).

The North Australian, 15 September 1863, page 1 (its first edition).

The North Australian, Ipswich and General Advertiser was the first newspaper published in Ipswich, Queensland, Australia. It was commonly called the North Australian as those words appeared most prominently on its masthead.

== History ==
=== The North Australian, Ipswich and General Advertiser ===
The first edition was published on 2 October 1855. The owners were Edmund John Bays and Arthur Charles Bays. The editor until about 1858 was Arthur Sidney Lyon. The last edition published was on 29 April 1862.

=== The North Australian and Queensland General Advertiser ===
It was replaced by the North Australian and Queensland General Advertiser owned by Richard Bedford which published its first edition on 1 May 1862 through to its last edition on 12 September 1863. Despite the removal of the word Ipswich in its title, the newspaper was still published in Ipswich.

=== The North Australian ===
It was followed by The North Australian published by Randal McDonnell. Its first edition was published on 15 September 1863 and its last on 25 March 1865. Unlike its predecessors, it was published in Brisbane.

== Digital preservation ==
Most editions of these newspapers are available through the National Library of Australia's Newspaper Digitisation Project.
