= White nationalism =

Ideology that seeks to develop a white national identity

White nationalism is a type of racial nationalism or pan-nationalism which espouses the belief that white people are a race and seeks to develop and maintain a white racial and national identity. White nationalists claim to seek and ensure the survival of the white race and the cultures of historically white states. They hold that white people should maintain their majority in majority-white countries, maintain their political and economic dominance, and that their cultures should be foremost in these countries. Many white nationalists believe that miscegenation, multiculturalism, immigration of nonwhites and low birth rates among whites are threatening the white race.

There are different means that white nationalists support to achieve their aims. In the United States most white nationalists say immigration should be restricted to people of European ancestry. There are those who support what is called remigration which is the mass deportation of non-white minority populations, especially immigrants and sometimes including native-born citizens, to their place of racial ancestry. There are those who identify with the concept of a white ethnostate.

Analysts describe white nationalism as overlapping with white supremacism and white separatism. White nationalism is sometimes described as a euphemism for, or subset of, white supremacism, and the two have been used interchangeably by journalists and analysts. White separatism is the pursuit of a "white-only state", while supremacism is the belief that white people are superior to nonwhites and should dominate them, taking ideas from social Darwinism and Nazism. Critics argue that the term "white nationalism" is simply a "rebranding", and ideas such as white pride exist solely to provide a sanitized public face for white supremacy, which white nationalists allegedly avoid using because of its negative connotations, and that most white nationalist groups promote racial violence.

== History and usage ==
According to Merriam-Webster, the first documented use of the term "white nationalist" was 1951, to refer to a member of a militant group that espouses white supremacy and racial segregation. Merriam-Webster also notes usage of the two-word phrase as early as 1925. According to Dictionary.com, the term was first used in the title of a 1948 essay by South African writer and ecologist Thomas Chalmers Robertson titled Racism Comes to Power in South Africa: The Threat of White Nationalism.

According to Daryl Johnson, a former counterterrorism expert at the United States Department of Homeland Security, the term was used to appear more credible while also avoiding negative stereotypes about white supremacists. Modern members of racist organizations such as the Ku Klux Klan generally favor the term and avoid self-describing as white supremacist.

Some sociologists have used white nationalism as an umbrella term for a range of white supremacist groups and ideologies, while others regard these movements as distinct. Analysis suggests that two groups largely overlap in terms of membership, ideology, and goals. Civil rights groups have described the two terms as functionally interchangeable. Ryan Lenz of the Southern Poverty Law Center has said "there is really no difference", and Kristen Clarke of the Lawyers' Committee for Civil Rights Under Law has said "There is no defensible distinction that can be drawn between white supremacy, white nationalism or white separatism in society today." News reports will sometimes refer to a group or movement by one term or the other, or both interchangeably.

== Views ==
White nationalists claim that culture is a product of race, and advocate for the self-preservation of white people. White nationalists seek to ensure the survival of the white race, and the cultures of historically white nations. They hold that white people should maintain their majority in mainly-white countries, maintain their dominance of its political and economic life, and that their culture should be foremost. Many white nationalists believe that miscegenation, multiculturalism, mass immigration of non-whites and low birth rates among whites are threatening the white race, and some argue that it amounts to white genocide.

Political scientist Samuel P. Huntington described white nationalists as arguing that the demographic shift in the United States towards non-whites would bring a new culture that is intellectually and morally inferior. White nationalists claim that this demographic shift brings affirmative action, immigrant ghettos and declining educational standards. Most American white nationalists say immigration should be restricted to people of European ancestry.

White nationalists embrace a variety of religious and non-religious beliefs, including various denominations of Christianity, generally Protestant, although some specifically overlap with white nationalist ideology (Christian Identity, for example, is a family of white supremacist denominations), Germanic neopaganism (e.g. Wotanism) and atheism.

=== Definitions of whiteness ===
Most white nationalists define white people in a restricted way. In the United States, it often—though not exclusively—implies European ancestry of non-Jewish descent. Some white nationalists draw on 19th-century racial taxonomy. White nationalist Jared Taylor has argued that Jews can be considered "white", although this is controversial within white nationalist circles. Many white nationalists oppose Israel and Zionism, while some, such as William Daniel Johnson and Taylor, have expressed support for Israel and have drawn parallels between their ideology and Zionism. Other white nationalists such as George Lincoln Rockwell exclude Jews from the definition but include Turks, who are a transcontinental ethnicity.

White nationalist sometimes use (perhaps even multiple contradictory) obsolete racial categories such as Aryanism, Nordicism, or the one-drop rule.

== Regional movements ==
=== Australia ===
The White Australia policy was semi-official government policy in Australia until the mid twentieth century. It restricted non-white immigration to Australia and gave preference to British migrants over all others.

The Barton government, which won the first elections following the Federation of Australia in 1901, was formed by the Protectionist Party with the support of the Australian Labor Party (ALP). The support of the Labor Party was contingent upon restricting non-white immigration, reflecting the attitudes of the Australian Workers' Union and other labor organizations at the time, upon whose support the Labor Party was founded. The first Parliament of Australia quickly moved to restrict immigration to maintain Australia's "British character", passing the Pacific Island Labourers Act 1901 and the Immigration Restriction Act 1901 before parliament rose for its first Christmas recess. The Immigration Restriction Act limited immigration to Australia and required a person seeking entry to Australia to write out a passage of 50 words dictated to them in any European language, not necessarily English, at the discretion of an immigration officer. Barton argued in favour of the bill: "The doctrine of the equality of man was never intended to apply to the equality of the Englishman and the Chinaman." The passage chosen for the test could often be very difficult, so that even if the test was given in English, a person was likely to fail. The test enabled immigration officials to exclude individuals on the basis of race without explicitly saying so. Although the test could theoretically be given to any person arriving in Australia, in practice it was given selectively on the basis of race. This test was later abolished in 1958.

Australian Prime Minister Stanley Bruce supported the White Australia policy, and made it an issue in his campaign for the 1925 Australian federal election.

It is necessary that we should determine what are the ideals towards which every Australian would desire to strive. I think those ideals might well be stated as being to secure our national safety, and to ensure the maintenance of our White Australia Policy to continue as an integral portion of the British Empire. We intend to keep this country white and not allow its peoples to be faced with the problems that at present are practically insoluble in many parts of the world.

At the beginning of World War II, Prime Minister John Curtin (ALP) expressed support for White Australia policy: "This country shall remain forever the home of the descendants of those people who came here in peace in order to establish in the South Seas an outpost of the British race."

Another (ALP) Leader of the Labor Party from 1960 to 1967 Arthur Calwell supported the White European Australia policy. This is reflected by Calwell's comments in his 1972 memoirs, Be Just and Fear Not, in which he made it clear that he maintained his view that non-European people should not be allowed to settle in Australia. He wrote:

I am proud of my white skin, just as a Chinese is proud of his yellow skin, a Japanese of his brown skin, and the Indians of their various hues from black to coffee-coloured. Anybody who is not proud of his race is not a man at all. And any man who tries to stigmatize the Australian community as racist because they want to preserve this country for the white race is doing our nation great harm ... I reject, in conscience, the idea that Australia should or ever can become a multi-racial society and survive.

He was the last leader of either the Labour or Liberal party to support it.

=== Canada ===
The Parliament of Canada passed the Chinese Immigration Act of 1923 to bar all Chinese from coming to Canada with the exception of diplomats, students, and those granted special permission by the Minister of Immigration. Chinese immigration to Canada had already been heavily regulated by the Chinese Immigration Act of 1885 which required Chinese immigrants to pay a $50 fee to enter the country (the fee was increased to one hundred dollars in 1900 and to five hundred dollars in 1903). Groups such as the Asiatic Exclusion League, which had formed in Vancouver, British Columbia, on 12 August 1907 under the auspices of the Trades and Labour Council, pressured Parliament to halt Asian immigration. The Exclusion League's stated aim was "to keep Oriental immigrants out of British Columbia."

The Canadian government also attempted to restrict immigration from British India by passing an order-in-council on 8 January 1908. It prohibited immigration of persons who "in the opinion of the Minister of the Interior" did not "come from the country of their birth or citizenship by a continuous journey and or through tickets purchased before leaving their country of their birth or nationality." In practice, this applied only to ships that began their voyages in India, because the great distance usually necessitated a stopover in either Japan or Hawaii. These regulations came at a time when Canada was accepting massive numbers of immigrants (over 400,000 in 1913 alone), almost all of whom came from Europe. This piece of legislation has been called the "continuous journey regulation".

=== Finland ===
White nationalist "Awakening" conference is held annually in Finland, attracting some hundreds of white nationalists from around the globe. The event has been attended by white supremacists from around the world; Jared Taylor of American Renaissance, Kevin MacDonald, representatives of the National Corps and others. Some of the founders of the influential Suomen Sisu anti-immigration organization were members of the pro-Aparheid "Friends of South Africa" organization.

In a 2023 survey conducted by Iltalehti, one-third of the voters of the far-right Finns Party, the second biggest party in parliament, thought that "the European race must be prevented from mixing with darker races, otherwise the European native population will eventually become extinct". Finns Party Minister of the Interior Mari Rantanen wrote that if Finns remain naive on immigration, Finns "will not remain blue-eyed" and shared writings referring to refugees as "parasites". Toni Jalonen, at the time deputy-chair of the Finns Party Youth, posted a picture of a black family with the text "Vote for the Finns, so that Finland's future doesn't look like this".

=== Germany ===
The Thule Society developed out of the "Germanic Order" in 1918, and those who wanted to join the Order in 1917 had to sign a special "blood declaration of faith" concerning their lineage: "The signer hereby swears to the best of his knowledge and belief that no Jewish or coloured blood flows in either his or in his wife's veins, and that among their ancestors are no members of the coloured races." Heinrich Himmler, one of the main perpetrators of the Holocaust, said in a speech in 1937: "The next decades do in fact not mean some struggle of foreign politics which Germany can overcome or not ... but a question of to be or not to be for the white race ..." As the Nazi ideologist Alfred Rosenberg said on 29 May 1938 on the Steckelburg in Schlüchtern: "It is however certain that all of us share the fate of Europe, and that we shall regard this common fate as an obligation, because in the end the very existence of White people depends on the unity of the European continent."

At the same time, the Nazi Party subdivided white people into groups, viewing the Nordics as the "master race" (Herrenvolk) above groups like Alpine and Mediterranean peoples. Slavic peoples, such as Russians and Poles, were considered Untermenschen (subhumans) instead of Aryan. Adolf Hitler's conception of the Aryan Herrenvolk ("Aryan master race") explicitly excluded the vast majority of Slavs, regarding the Slavs as having dangerous Jewish and Asiatic influences. The Nazis, because of this, declared Slavs to be Untermenschen. Hitler described Slavs as "a mass of born slaves who feel the need of a master". Hitler declared that because Slavs were subhumans that the Geneva Conventions were not applicable to them, and German soldiers in World War II were thus permitted to ignore the Geneva Conventions in regard to Slavs. Hitler called Slavs "a rabbit family" meaning they were intrinsically idle and disorganized. Nazi Germany's propaganda minister Joseph Goebbels had media speak of Slavs as primitive animals who were from the Siberian tundra who were like a "dark wave of filth". The Nazi notion of Slavs being inferior was part of the agenda for creating Lebensraum ("living space") for Germans and other Germanic people in Central and Eastern Europe that was initiated during World War II under Generalplan Ost, millions of Germans and other Germanic settlers would be moved into conquered territories of Eastern Europe, while the original Slavic inhabitants were to be exterminated and enslaved. Nazi Germany's ally the Independent State of Croatia rejected the common conception that Croats were primarily a Slavic people and claimed that Croats were primarily the descendants of the Germanic Goths. However the Nazi regime continued to classify Croats as "subhuman" in spite of the alliance.

=== Hungary ===
Hungarian Prime Minister Viktor Orbán stated in 2018 that "we do not want to be diverse and do not want to be mixed: we do not want our own colour, traditions and national culture to be mixed with those of others." In 2022, he stated that "we do not want to become peoples of mixed-race," praising The Camp of the Saints and referring specifically to the admixture of Europeans and non-European migrants, commenting that racially mixed countries "are no longer nations." Two days later in Vienna, he clarified that he was talking about cultures and not about race. Laura Barrón-López of PBS described his ideology as white nationalist. White nationalists of the American alt-right and the European identitarian movements enthusiastically support Orbán's policies. Some have personally migrated there and collaborated with the political party Jobbik.

=== New Zealand ===
Following the example of anti-Chinese poll taxes enacted by California in 1852 and by Australian states in the 1850s, 1860s and 1870s, John Hall's government passed the Chinese Immigration Act 1881. This imposed a £10 tax per Chinese person entering the Colony of New Zealand, and permitted only one Chinese immigrant for every 10 tons of cargo. Richard Seddon's government increased the tax to £100 per head in 1896, and tightened the other restriction to only one Chinese immigrant for every 200 tons of cargo.

The Immigration Restriction Act of 1899 prohibited the entry of immigrants who were not of British or Irish parentage and who were unable to fill out an application form in "any European language". The Immigration Restriction Amendment Act 1920 aimed to further limit Asian immigration into the Dominion of New Zealand by requiring all potential immigrants not of British or Irish parentage to apply in writing for a permit to enter the country. The Minister of Customs had the discretion to determine whether any applicant was "suitable". Prime Minister William Massey asserted that the act was "the result of a deep seated sentiment on the part of a huge majority of the people of this country that this Dominion shall be what is often called a 'white' New Zealand."

One case of a well known opponent of non-European immigration to New Zealand is that of white supremacist Lionel Terry who, after traveling widely to South Africa, British Columbia and finally New Zealand and publishing a book highly critical of capitalism and Asian immigration, shot and killed an elderly Chinese immigrant in Wellington. Terry was convicted of murder in 1905 and sentenced to death, but the sentence was commuted to life incarceration in New Zealand psychiatric institutions.

A Department of External Affairs memorandum in 1953 stated: "Our immigration is based firmly on the principle that we are and intend to remain a country of European development. It is inevitably discriminatory against Asians—indeed against all persons who are not wholly of European race and colour. Whereas we have done much to encourage immigration from Europe, we do everything to discourage it from Asia."

=== Paraguay ===
In Paraguay, the New Australian Movement founded New Australia, a white supremacist utopian socialist settlement in 1893. Its founder, William Lane, intended the settlement to be based on a "common-hold" instead of a commonwealth, life marriage, teetotalism, communism and a brotherhood of Anglophone white people and the preservation of the "colour-line". The colony was officially founded as Colonia Nueva Australia and comprised 238 adults and children.

In July 1893, the first ship left Sydney, Australia for Paraguay, where the government was keen to get white settlers, and had offered the group a large area of good land. The settlement had been described as a refuge for misfits, failures and malcontents of the left wing of Australian democracy. Notable Australian individuals who joined the colony included Mary Gilmore, Rose Summerfield and Gilbert Stephen Casey. Summerfield was the mother of León Cadogan, a noted Paraguayan ethnologist.

Due to poor management and a conflict over the prohibition of alcohol, the government of Paraguay eventually dissolved New Australia as a cooperative. Some colonists founded communes elsewhere in Paraguay but others returned to Australia or moved to England. As of 2008, around 2,000 descendants of the New Australia colonists still lived in Paraguay.

=== South Africa ===
In South Africa, white nationalism was championed by the National Party starting in 1914, when it was established as a political party to represent Afrikaners after the Second Boer War by J. B. M. Hertzog in 1914. It articulated a policy promoting white "civilised labour" above African "swart gevaar," and some radical nationalist movements such as the Afrikaner Broederbond, D. F. Malan's Purified National Party, and Oswald Pirow's New Order openly sympathized with Nazi Germany. In 1948, the Reunited National Party under Malan won the South African general election against the more moderate United Party and implemented the segregationist social system known as apartheid.

During the 1960s, 1970s, and early 1980s, the government implemented a policy of "resettlement", to force people to move to their designated "group areas". Millions of people were forced to relocate during this period. These removals included people relocated due to slum clearance programs, labour tenants on White-owned farms, the inhabitants of the so-called "black spots", areas of Black owned land surrounded by White farms, the families of workers living in townships close to the homelands, and "surplus people" from urban areas, including thousands of people from the Western Cape (which was declared a "Coloured Labour Preference Area") who were moved to the Transkei and Ciskei homelands. The best-publicised forced removals of the 1950s occurred in Johannesburg, when 60,000 people were moved to the new township of Soweto, an abbreviation for South Western Townships.

Before South Africa became a republic, politics among white South Africans was typified by the division between the chiefly Afrikaans-speaking pro-republic conservative and the largely English-speaking anti-republican liberal sentiments, with the legacy of the Boer War still constituting a political factor for sections of the white populace. Once South Africa's status as a republic was attained, Hendrik Verwoerd called for improved relations and greater accord between the two groups. He claimed that the only difference now was between those who supported apartheid and those who stood in opposition to it. The ethnic divide would no longer be between white Afrikaans-speakers and English-speakers, but rather White and Black South Africans. Most Afrikaners supported the notion of unanimity of White people to ensure their safety. Anglophone white South Africans voters were divided. Many had opposed a republic, leading to a majority "no" vote in Natal. Later, however, some of them recognized the perceived need for White unity, convinced by the growing trend of decolonization elsewhere in Africa, which left them apprehensive. Harold Macmillan's "Wind of Change" pronouncement lead the Anglophone white South African population to perceive that the British government had abandoned them. The more conservative Anglophones gave support to Verwoerd; others were troubled by the severing of ties with Britain and remained loyal to the Crown. They were acutely displeased at the choice between British and South African nationality. Although Verwoerd tried to bond these different blocs, the subsequent ballot illustrated only a minor swell of support, indicating that a great many Anglophones remained apathetic and that Verwoerd had not succeeded in uniting the White population in South Africa.

The Black Homeland Citizenship Act of 1970 was a denaturalization law passed during the apartheid era of South Africa that changed the status of the inhabitants of the Bantustans (Black homelands) so that they were no longer citizens of South Africa. The aim was to ensure that white South Africans came to make up the majority of the de jure population.

=== United States ===
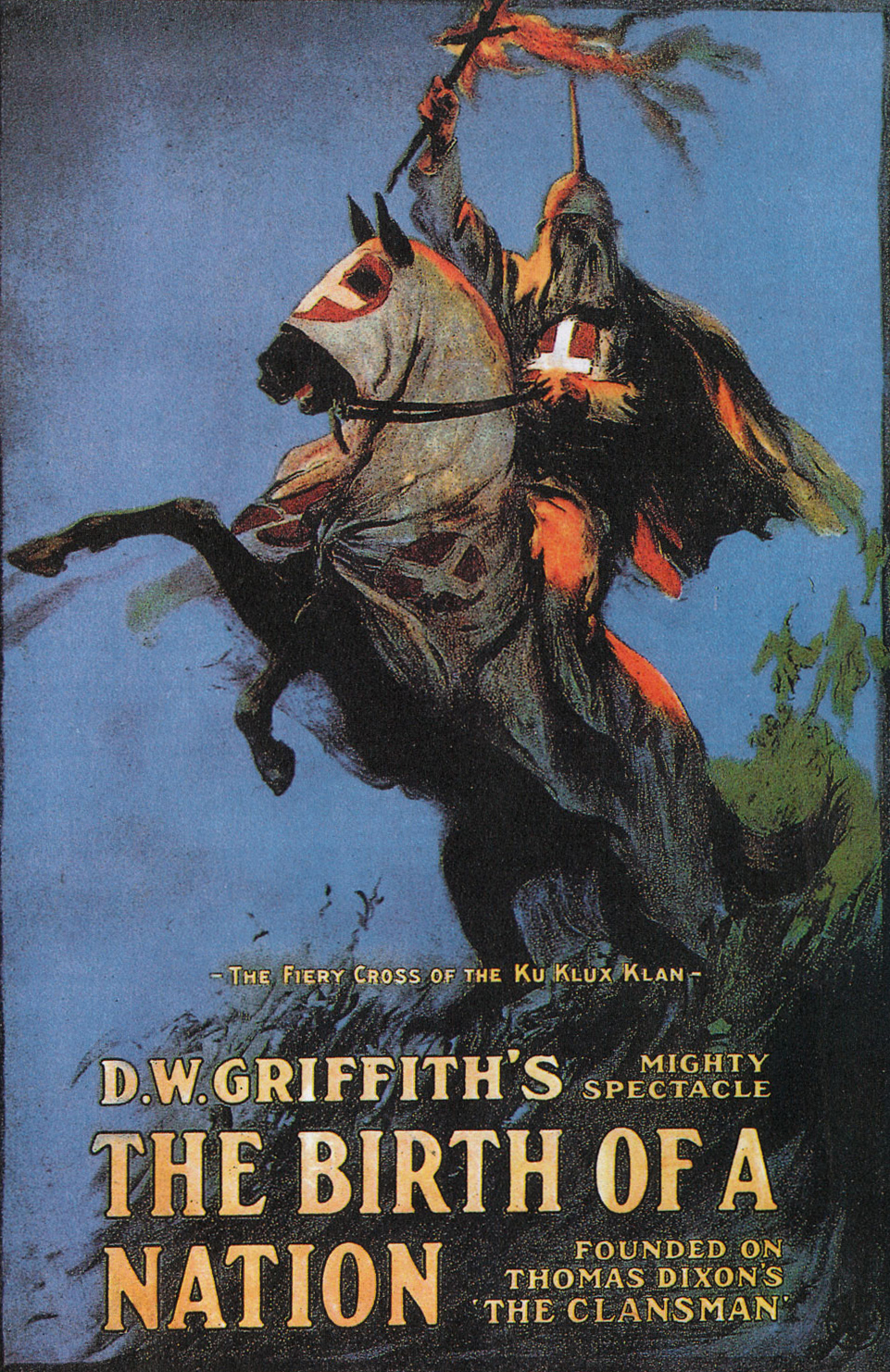
Poster for The Birth of a Nation (1915)

The Naturalization Act of 1790 (1 Stat. 103) provided the first rules to be followed by the United States government in granting national citizenship. This law limited naturalization to immigrants who were "free white persons" of "good moral character." In 1856, the U.S. Supreme Court ruled in the Dred Scott v. Sandford decision that free blacks descended from slaves could not hold United States citizenship even if they had been born in the country.

Major changes to this racial requirement for US citizenship did not occur until the years following the American Civil War. In 1868, the Fourteenth Amendment to the United States Constitution was passed to grant birthright citizenship to black people born in the US, but it specifically excluded untaxed Indians, because they were separate nations. However, citizenship for other non-whites born in the US was not settled until 1898 with United States v. Wong Kim Ark, 169 U.S. 649, which concluded with an important precedent in its interpretation of the Citizenship Clause of the Fourteenth Amendment. This racial definition of American citizenship has had consequences for perceptions of American identity.

Following the defeat of the Confederate States of America and the abolition of slavery in the United States at the end of the American Civil War, the Ku Klux Klan (KKK) was founded as an insurgent group with the goal of maintaining the Southern racial system throughout the Reconstruction Era. Although the first incarnation of the KKK was focused on maintaining the Antebellum South, its second incarnation in the 1915-1940s period was much more oriented towards white nationalism and American nativism. The second KKK was founded in Atlanta, Georgia, in 1915 and, starting in 1921, it adopted a modern business system of recruiting. The organization grew rapidly nationwide at a time of prosperity. Reflecting the social tensions of urban industrialization and vastly increased immigration, its membership grew most rapidly in cities and spread out of the South to the Midwest and West. The second KKK called for strict morality and better enforcement of prohibition. Its rhetoric promoted anti-Catholicism and nativism. Some local groups took part in attacks on private houses and carried out other violent activities. The violent episodes were generally in the South.

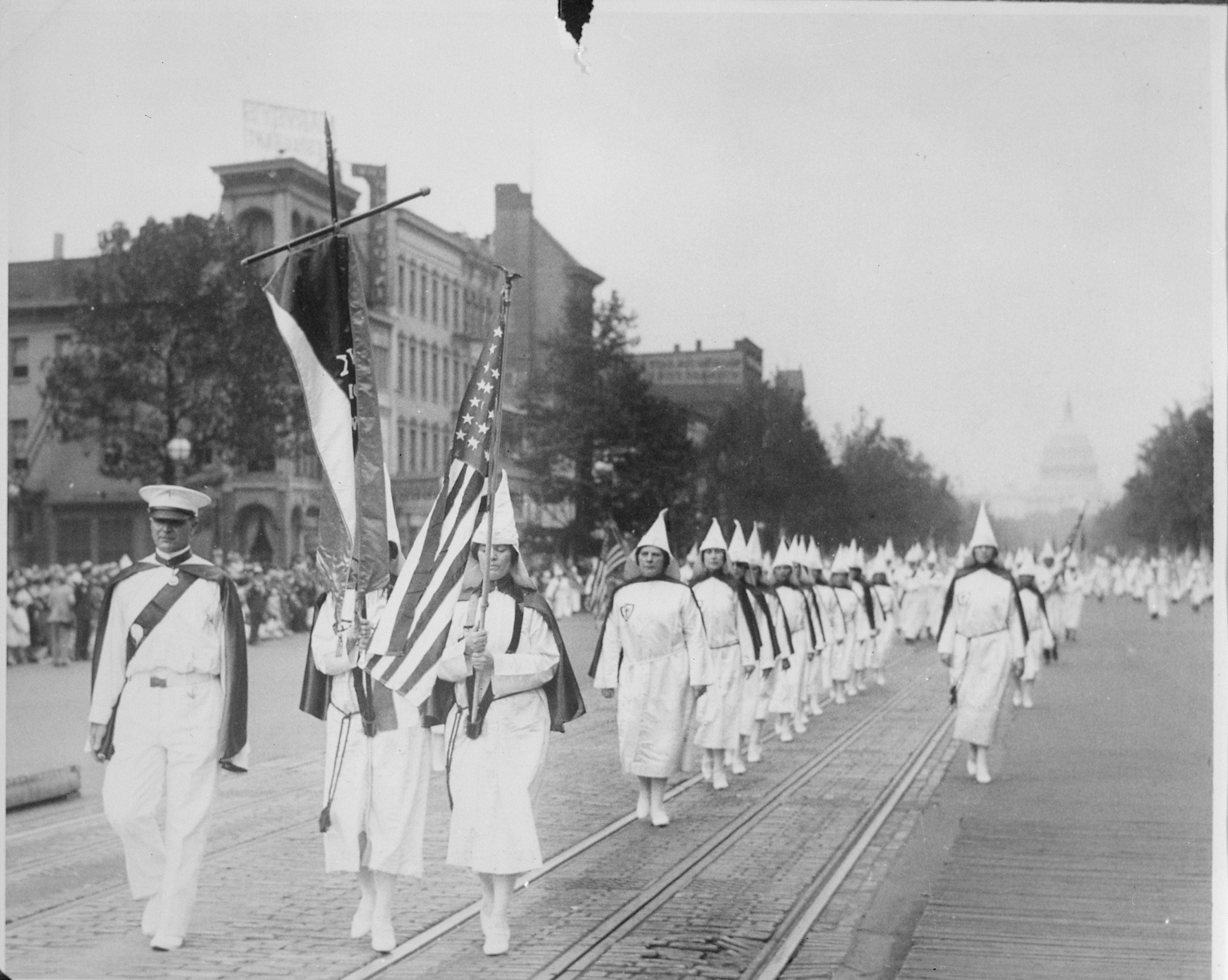
Ku Klux Klan members march down Pennsylvania Avenue in Washington, D.C., in 1928.

The second KKK was a formal fraternal organization, with a national and state structure. At its peak in the mid-1920s, the organization claimed to include about 15% of the nation's eligible population, approximately 4 to 5 million men. Internal divisions, criminal behavior by leaders, and external opposition brought about a collapse in membership, which had dropped to about 30,000 by 1930. It faded away in the 1940s.

Starting in the 1960s, white nationalism grew in the US as the conservative movement developed in mainstream society. The Immigration and Nationality Act of 1965 had opened entry to the US to immigrants other than traditional Northern European and Germanic groups, and as a result it would significantly, and unintentionally, alter the demographic mix in the US.

A movement calling for white separatism emerged in the 1980s. During the 1980s the United States also saw an increase in the number of esoteric subcultures within white nationalism. According to Nicholas Goodrick-Clarke, these movements cover a wide variety of mutually influencing groups of a radically ethnocentric character which have emerged, especially in the English-speaking world, since World War II. These loose networks use a variety of mystical, occult or religious approaches in a defensive affirmation of white identity against modernity, liberalism, immigration, multiracialism, and multiculturalism. Some are neo-fascist, neo-Nazi or Third Positionist; others are politicised around some form of white ethnic nationalism or identity politics, and a few have national anarchist tendencies.

In the 2010s, the alt-right, a broad term covering many different far-right ideologies and groups in the United States, some of which endorse white nationalism, gained traction as an alternative to mainstream conservatism in its national politics.

In 2016, the American National Election Studies survey conducted during Donald Trump's campaign for the presidency found that 38% of Americans expressed "strong feelings of white solidarity", 28% "strong feelings of white identity", 27% that whites suffer from discrimination in American society, while 6% agree with all these propositions.

In 2020, it was reported that white nationalist groups leaving flyers, stickers, banners and posters in public places more than doubled from 1,214 in 2018 to 2,713 in 2019.

According to journalist David D. Kirkpatrick, as of mid-2024, scholars of the far right estimate that 100,000 Americans "actively participate in organized white nationalist groups".

== Heterodox views ==
Numerous individuals and organizations have argued that ideas such as white pride and white nationalism exist merely to provide a sanitized public face for white supremacy. Kofi Buenor Hadjor argues that black nationalism is a response to racial discrimination, while white nationalism is the expression of white supremacy. Other critics have described white nationalism as a "... somewhat paranoid ideology" based upon the publication of pseudo-academic studies.

Carol M. Swain argues that the unstated goal of white nationalism is to appeal to a larger audience, and that most white nationalist groups promote white separatism and racial violence. Opponents accuse white nationalists of hatred, racial bigotry, and destructive identity politics. White supremacist groups have a history of perpetrating hate crimes, particularly against people of Jewish and African descent. Examples include the lynching of black people by the Ku Klux Klan (KKK).

Some critics argue that white nationalists—while posturing as civil rights groups advocating the interests of their racial group—frequently draw on the nativist traditions of the KKK and the National Front. Critics have noted the anti-semitic rhetoric used by some white nationalists, as highlighted by the promotion of conspiracy theories such as Zionist Occupation Government.

== See also ==
- Blood and Soil
- Criticism of multiculturalism
- Identitarian movement
- Immigration to the Western world#Backlash
- Know Nothing
- National-Anarchism
- Neo-nationalism
- Pan-European nationalism
- The Passing of the Great Race
- Black nationalism
- White Americans
- White supremacism
