= Australian Paraguayans =

Citizens of Paraguay of Australian background

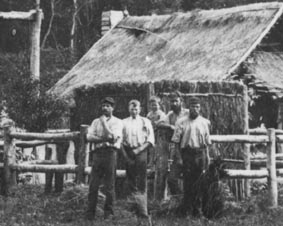
- New Australia, Paraguay

Total population
- 2,000

Regions with significant populations
- Asunción · New Australia

Languages
- Paraguayan Spanish · Guaraní · Australian English

Related ethnic groups
- Australian diaspora · other Hispanic and Latin American Australians

Australian Paraguayans are citizens of Paraguay of Australian background. Most of them are descendants of a group of radical socialist Australians who voluntarily went to Paraguay to create a failed master-planned community, known as Nueva (New) Australia.

== History ==
In 1893, a group of Australian shearers fed up with the lack of job opportunities and security were persuaded by a controversial journalist, William Lane, to form the New Australia movement and over 2,000 prospective colonists signed up immediately. Paraguay was eager to offer the Australian colonists 75,000 hectares (185,000 acres) of fertile land. Having lost 90% of its male population only 20 years before in the Paraguayan War the country was desperate for manpower to work the land and re-populate the diminished nation.

The first group, almost entirely men, was meant to set everything up for the thousands who would follow, and create the world’s first great communist city. They secured a ship to Buenos Aires in Argentina and from there the 238 adults and children travelled across the grasslands in the heart of South America to Paraguay, where the national government had granted them land to start their own colony. For a few years, new colonists continued to trickle into both communities from Australia and the UK, but the majority of settlers left, heading back to Australia or to farm work on Patagonian estancias. But, around eight families did remain and to this day 2,000 descendants of those colonists still call Paraguay home.

== Notable people ==
- León Cadogan - Paraguayan ethnologist
- Gilbert Casey - Australian trade unionist
- Mary Gilmore - Australian socialist poet and journalist.
- William Lane - Pioneer of the Australian labour movement and utopian.
- Rose Summerfield - Australian feminist and labour activist.
- Robin Wood - Paraguayan comic book writer
- Alex Sharman - Former rugby union player for Paraguay national rugby union team.

== See also ==
- Australia–Paraguay relations
- Foreign relations of Australia
- Foreign relations of Paraguay
- Confederados - Brazilians descended from Confederate Americans who fled the United States to Brazil after the American Civil War
- Nueva Londres
- Paraguayan Australians
