= Londres =

Londres may refer to:

== Locations ==
- London, capital of the United Kingdom and England, called Londres in French, Spanish, Portuguese, Catalan, Galician, and Filipino, etc.
- Londres, Catamarca, Argentina, formally "San Juan de la Ribera de Londres" or "Londres de la Nueva Inglaterra"
- Londres, Lot-et-Garonne, a former commune of France, now part of Puymiclan
- Nueva Londres, a town in the Caaguazú department of Paraguay

== People with the surname ==
- Albert Londres (1884–1932), French journalist and writer
- Richie Londres, also known as Altered Beats, English musician, hip hop record producer, lead guitarist and multi-instrumentalist

== Other uses ==
- Albert Londres Prize, prize in the name of Albert Londres
- Radio Londres, a radio broadcast from 1940 to 1944 from the BBC in London to Nazi occupied France
- Londres Nova, Mars, capital of the Martian Congressional Republic in the Expanse series

== See also ==
- London (disambiguation)
