= Alex Sharman =

Paraguay international rugby union player

- Born: Alex Sharman Tasmania, Australia

Rugby union career
International career
Years	Team	Apps	(Points)
2008–2010	Paraguay		

Alex Sharman (born in Tasmania, Australia) is an Australian Paraguayan retired rugby union player, who played for the Paraguay national rugby union team.

== Personal life ==
During the 2010 FIFA World Cup, Sharman supported Paraguay from the Sydney Opera House.

== Career ==
=== Early life ===
Sharman was born in Hobart, Tasmania, and started playing rugby at The Hutchins School, captaining the school to a premiership: he also captained Tasmania at underage level. Both of his brothers were also rugby players, who represented Tasmania and spent time playing in Europe.

=== Sydney ===
He moved to Sydney at 17 to study and play a higher level of rugby, playing for Sydney Uni Football Club between 1995 and 2002 and winning a number of colts and lower grade Premierships. He made his first grade debut in the semi-finals of the Shute Shield in 2000.

=== European and American rugby ===
In 2002, he left Australia to travel the world and play rugby. He played seasons for Falkirk RFC (Scotland) in 2002, followed by Hinckley RFC (England) in 2002-3 and Clifton Rugby Football Club(England) in 2003-4. In 2003, he was called up to play for an understrength Fijian side in a match against Bristol rugby.

In February 2004, Sharman moved to the U.S.A. where he played for the St. Louis Ramblers (Missouri) for 6 months.

He then moved to La Villajoyosa, Spain, where he spent 2 years playing for CR La Vila. He became player-coach of La Vila in December 2004, holding that position until December 2005 when he broke his ankle.

=== Paraguay ===
In February 2006, unsure if he would be able to play rugby again following his broken ankle, Sharman moved to Paraguay for personal reasons. He resumed playing rugby later that year for the San Jose Rugby Club in Asuncion.

In 2009, Sharman changed clubs to the CURDA club (Club Universitario de Rugby De Asuncion).

He retired from rugby at the end of 2012, after winning a second Paraguayan Rugby Union title with CURDA.

== International career ==
In 2008, Sharman began playing for Paraguay, following strong performances for his club. He was selected in the training squad for that year's 2008 South American Rugby Championship "B" and made his debut for the Paraguay national rugby union team in the Pre-Sudamericano tour of Rosario. Due to eligibility issues (he had not fulfilled the 36 months of residency required by the IRB), he had to leave the squad the week before the championship. At the end of that year, Sharman was selected for Paraguay in the Cross-Border tournament against Argentine provinces.

On 25 April 2009, Sharman made his test debut against Uruguay in Montevideo after fulfilling IRB residency requirements, representing Paraguay at the 2009 South American Rugby Championship "A" in Montevideo, Uruguay. Later that year he won the Paraguayan League with his club and also played for Paraguay in the Cross-Border Competition.

In 2010, Sharman was again starting prop for the Yacares (the nickname of the Paraguayan National Rugby team) in the 2010 South American Rugby Championship "A" Sudamericano A in Chile, playing tests against Chile, Uruguay and Brazil. On 19 May 2010, Sharman made his last test appearance against Brazil in Santiago.

In 2011, political problems within Paraguayan rugby meant that the strongest clubs, including CURDA, did not allow their players to be selected for the South American Championship.
