= Denny Cochran =

American football player (1915–1992)

Profile
- Positions: Quarterback, running back, end

Personal information
- Born: December 4, 1915; East St. Louis, Illinois, U.S.
- Died: January 18, 1992 (aged 76); Kirkwood, Missouri, U.S.
- Listed height: 6 ft 0 in (1.83 m)
- Listed weight: 190 lb (86 kg)

Career information
- High school: East St. Louis
- College: St. Louis
- NFL draft: 1939: 12th round, 101st overall pick

Career history
- Pittsburgh Pirates (1939)*; St. Louis Gunners (1939); St. Louis Ramblers (rugby) (1940s)
- * Offseason or practice squad member only

Dennis Eugene Cochran (December 4, 1915 – January 18, 1992) was an American football player.

Cochran was born on December 4, 1915, in East St. Louis, Illinois. He attended high school there before playing college football at St. Louis University. He gained popularity as a quarterback, running back, and end. He was named a Missouri Valley Conference All-Star in both 1937 and '38. After his final season of college football, 1938, he was selected by P. B. Williams as an alternative selection for the All-America team. He was chosen as the 101st pick of the 1939 NFL draft by the Pittsburgh Pirates following his collegiate career. He did not play for the Pirates and instead went to the St. Louis Gunners. He made his debut with them on September 24, leading them to a 35–0 victory over the Dayton Bombers. He spent one season with the Gunners, playing in eight games, before joining the St. Louis Ramblers rugby team. A few years later he coached the St. Louis Brewers basketball team. Cochran died on January 18, 1992, at the age of 76, of a heart disease.
