= Falkirk RFC =

Scottish rugby union club, based in Falkirk

Coordinates: 56.00622°N 3.80486°W

Falkirk Rugby Football Club
- Union: Scottish Rugby Union
- Founded: 1972; 53 years ago
- Location: Falkirk, Scotland
- Ground(s): Horne Park
- League(s): Scottish National League Division Two
- 2024–25: Scottish National League Division Two, 3rd of 9
Team kit

Official website
- www.falkirkrfc.com

Falkirk Rugby Football Club is a rugby union club based in Falkirk, Scotland. They currently compete in Scottish National League Division One, the second tier of Scottish club rugby. The club play their home matches at Horne Park.

== History ==
The club's roots in Falkirk can be traced back through the Falkirk Herald Archives to 1906 when Falkirk Rugby Football Club was first formed. The club is recorded as having played at both the Tryst and Windsor Parks before they became a casualty of the First World War; although the game was still played at Falkirk High School, then part of the Midlands Schools Rugby Association.

For over half a century Falkirk did not feature on the Scottish rugby map until 1972 when the ICI Grangemouth RFC transferred its assets to Falkirk. ICI Grangemouth RFC had been in existence for over a decade, founded in season 1962–63 by ICI employees Bill McMillan and Lyn Jones. The club growth was restricted, however, by ICI and the decision was made to move to Falkirk and start afresh. Bill McMillan was elected as the first club president in 1972 and the clubhouse was opened by Harry Ewing MP in 1980.

For the first 25 years of the new club progress was slow and movement out of the lower league divisions difficult. Three successive relegations had taken the club to a nadir. Club members voiced their concern and a new administration took over in 1997 with Alex McQuade as president elect.

=== Since 2000 ===
Thereafter the club's first notable appointment was that of former Scotland, Caledonia Reds, Dundee HSFP and Hillfoots prop John Manson as club coach. Under Manson's leadership the club won the Scottish Shield in 2007 and achieved five consecutive league championship titles between 2003–04 and 2007–08. These achievements were recognised by the SRU and culminated in the club being awarded the "SRU Club of the Year" for the 2007–08 season.

== Honours ==
- Scottish National League Division Two
  - Champions: (1) 2007-08
- Scottish Rugby Shield
  - Champions: (1) 2006-07
- Rosyth and District Sevens
  - Champions: (1) 1990
- McLaren HSFP Sevens
  - Champions: (1) 1992
- Waid Academy F.P. Sevens
  - Champions: (1) 1983
- Hillfoots Sevens
  - Champions: (1) 1981, 1982
- Holy Cross Sevens
  - Champions: (1) 1983
- Kirkcaldy Sevens
  - Champions: (1) 2015

== Notable former players ==
=== Glasgow Warriors players ===
The following former Falkirk players have represented Glasgow Warriors.

- (Scotland) Finn Russell
- (Scotland) Mark McKenzie
- (Scotland) Dave Millard
- (Scotland) David Jamieson
- (Scotland) Kyle Rowe

=== Scotland ===
The following former Fakirk players have represented Scotland at full international level.

- (Scotland) Finn Russell
- (Scotland) Kyle Rowe

=== Notable non-Scottish players ===
The following is a list of notable non-Scottish international representative former Falkirk players:

Paraguay

- (Paraguay) Alex Sharman
