= John Stanislaus Hanlon =

Australian journalist and politician

The Hon Jack Hanlon
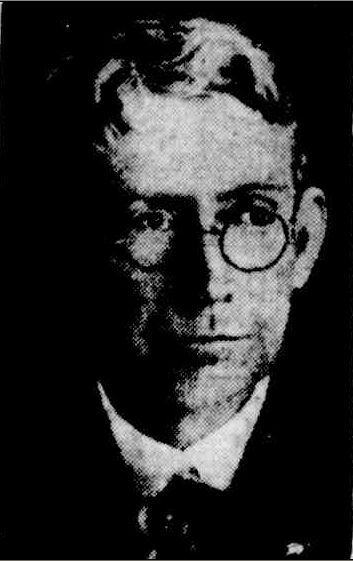
- John (Jack) Stanislaus Hanlon

Member of the Queensland Legislative Council
- In office 19 February 1920 – 23 March 1922

Personal details
- Born: John Stanislaus Hanlon; 16 November 1883 Creswick, Victoria, Australia
- Died: 13 September 1949 (aged 65) Sydney, Australia
- Party: Labor
- Spouse: Mary Cotter (m.1908)
- Occupation: Journalist, newspaper editor

John Stanislaus Hanlon (16 November 1883 – 13 September 1949) was a journalist and member of the Queensland Legislative Council.

== Early life ==
Hanlon was born at Creswick, Victoria, to Christopher Hanlon and was educated at Creswick State School, and St. Patrick's College, Ballarat. He began work as a journalist, first in Ballarat, and then in Perth, Western Australia where he founded the Western Australian branch of the Australian Journalists' Association. By 1915, Hanlon was in Brisbane and began a long association with The Worker newspaper.

In February 1908, Hanlon married Mary Cotter and together they had 2 children.

== Political career ==
When the Labour Party starting forming governments in Queensland, it found much of its legislation being blocked by a hostile Council, where members had been appointed for life by successive conservative governments. After a failed referendum in May 1917, Premier Ryan tried a new tactic, and later that year advised the Governor, Sir Hamilton John Goold-Adams, to appoint thirteen new members whose allegiance lay with Labour to the council. The council, however, continued to reject the government's money bills and in 1918 Ryan advised Goold-Adams to appoint additional Labour members, but this time he refused the request.

In 1920, the new Premier Ted Theodore appointed a further fourteen new members to the Council with Hanlon amongst the appointees. He served for two years until the council was abolished in March 1922.

== After politics ==
Hanlon continued his work with The Worker for another 20 years and becoming its editor. In 1921, while serving in the council, Hanlon was made a member of the University of Queensland senate, holding the role until 1943. Hanlon moved to Sydney in 1943 to continue his work as an editor, this time with The Australian Worker newspaper. His final appointment came in 1945 when he was made a member of the Australian Broadcasting Commission, serving until his death four years later.

Hanlon died of pneumonia in Sydney in September 1949.
