= Rooi gevaar =

Afrikaans phrase

Rooi gevaar (English: Red danger) is an Afrikaans phrase, sometimes translated into English as "Communist danger". The term gained popularity in South Africa during the Cold War and was associated with the perceived threat of international communism to religious, economic, and political freedom on the Southern African subcontinent. This pretext was used to justify the banning of the South African Communist Party (SACP) and its sister organisation, the African National Congress (ANC), which were regarded as leading anti-apartheid movements. Alternatively, the phrase rooi komplot (English: Red plot) was also used.

The term diminished in use after the collapse of the Soviet Union in 1991.

== See also ==
- Red Scare
- McCarthyism
- Swart gevaar ("black threat")
