= Israel–Paraguay relations =

- Israel: Paraguay

Diplomatic mission
- Embassy of Paraguay, Jerusalem: Embassy of Israel, Asunción

Envoy
- Ambassador Amit Mekel: Ambassador Alejandro Rubín

Israel–Paraguay relations are the bilateral relations between Israel and Paraguay. Both countries have full diplomatic relations since the middle of the 20th century, and each has been represented by a full embassy in the other.

== History ==
In 1947, Paraguay was one of the 33 countries that voted for the United Nations Partition Plan for Palestine, effectively paving way for the creation of Israel. The two countries opened up diplomatic relations in 1949.

Israel's embassy in Asunción was closed in 2002 due to budget cuts, although some legal professionals in Israel alleged that it was on religious grounds (as it related to mutual recognition of marriages by both countries). It was reopened in July 2015. In 2005, the Paraguayan embassy in Mevaseret Zion was closed, also due to budgetary constraints, and it was reopened in 2013 in the Tel Aviv District city of Herzliya.

On May 21, 2018, Paraguayan President Horacio Cartes announced that the Paraguayan embassy moved to Jerusalem, becoming the third country in the world, after the United States and Guatemala, to recognize the city as the diplomatic capital of Israel. Israeli Prime Minister Benjamin Netanyahu greatly appreciated it; on the very day of the transfer, he attended the opening ceremony and there expressed an enduring friendship. This was reversed in September 2018 by Cartes' successor, Mario Abdo Benítez. Foreign Minister Luis Castiglioni stated that "Paraguay wants to contribute to an intensification of regional diplomatic efforts to achieve a broad, fair and lasting peace in the Middle East." Israel subsequently shut down its embassy and cancelled a delegation aimed at aiding Paraguay's economic development. In May 2023, President-elect Santiago Peña announced that he intended to move the Paraguayan Embassy in Israel from Tel Aviv to Jerusalem again after being sworn in as president. After being sworn in, President Peña followed through on his promise, announcing the Paraguayan Embassy would open in Jerusalem before the end of 2023. In 2024, Paraguay supported Israel in the South African case against Israel.

In 2024, Paraguay voted against an arms embargo against Israel at the United Nations Human Rights Council. In December, Paraguay's embassy in Jerusalem was inaugurated.

In September 2026, Paraguayan President Santiago Peña met Israeli Prime Minister Benjamin Netanyahu together with leaders from several Latin American countries at the United Nations General Assembly in New York.

== Embassy ==
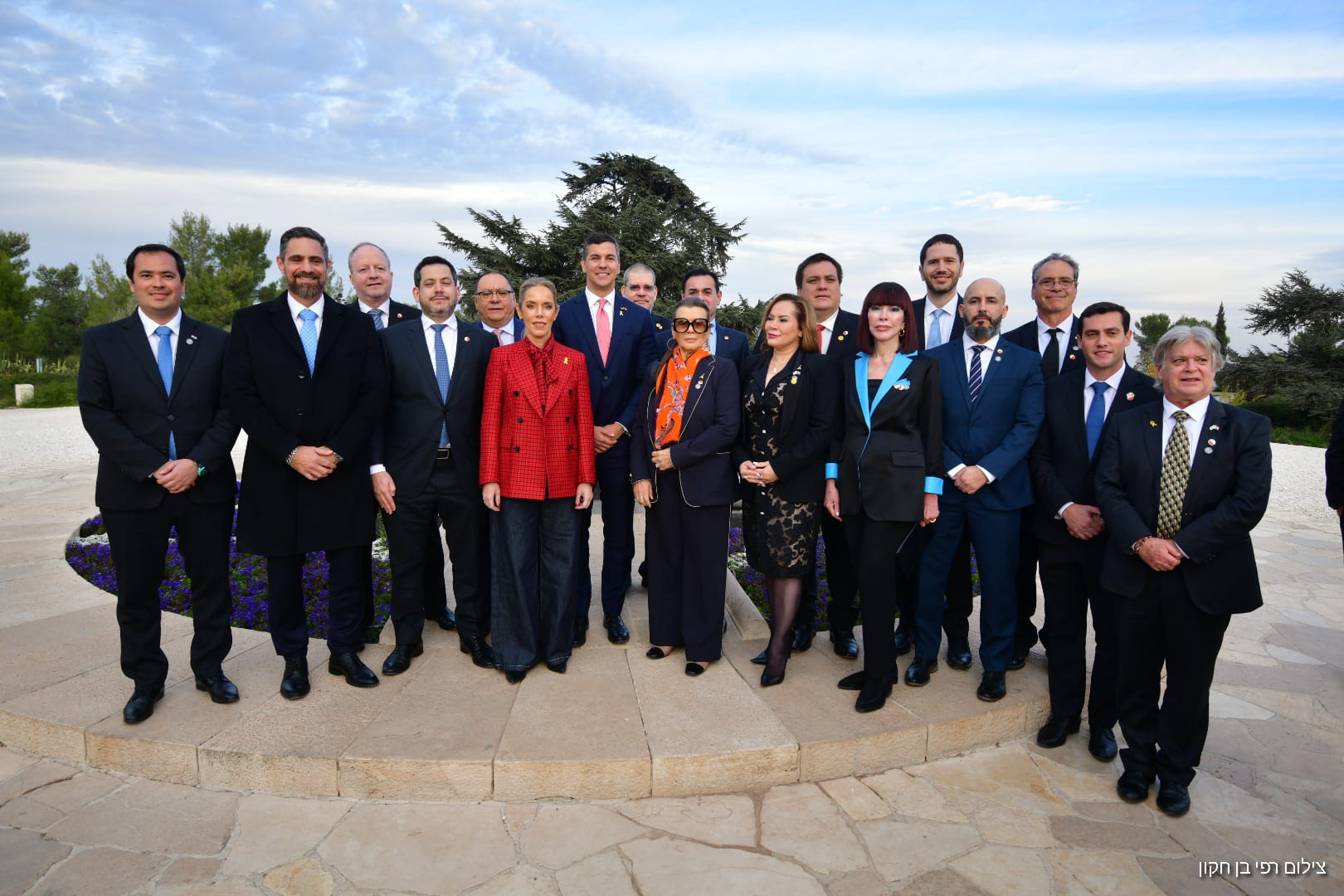
President Santiago Peña with representatives of the Paraguayan government at Mount Herzl in December 2024

On December 12, 2024, Paraguay opened its new embassy in Jerusalem. President Santiago Peña took part in the ceremony and was addressed by Prime Minister Benjamin Netanyahu who declared: "Jerusalem will always be the undivided capital of Israel...This is a fact, and you recognized it. Thank you for opening the embassy here".

== Foreign aid ==
In January 2016, Israel sent aid to assist Paraguay in coping with the heavy flooding that had taken place there and had displaced about 100,000 people. In June 2016, Netafim sent advanced drip irrigation systems to help Paraguay with a drought through Israel's embassy in Asunción.

== Economic relations ==
Israel's exports to Paraguay totaled US$6.69 million in 2014, focusing on electronics and minerals. Paraguay's exports to Israel in the same year totaled US$145 million, made up almost exclusively of frozen meat and soybeans.

In 2005, when Israel's exports to Paraguay totaled US$2.5 million, the two countries signed a mutual export agreement, which stipulated that each country would help increase mutual trade. In 2010, Israel and Paraguay also agreed to cooperate on agriculture and signed as customs agreement.

In 2015 it was reported that the Paraguayan Army purchased a number of Negev light machine guns from Israel Weapon Industries.

== High-level visits ==
- In November 2005, Vice-President Luis Castiglioni of Paraguay made an official visit to Israel.
- In November 2013, Paraguay's minister of industry and commerce Gustavo Leite visited Israel for its WATEC water technology conference, as a guest of then-minister of economy Naftali Bennett.
- In July 2016, President Horacio Cartes made an official visit to Israel, the first by a Paraguayan president. Among other things, he signed a memorandum of understanding under which Israel would assist Paraguay technologically.

== See also ==
- History of the Jews in Paraguay
- 1969 Paraguay plan, an Israeli plan to relocate Palestinians to Paraguay.
