= Australia–Paraguay relations =

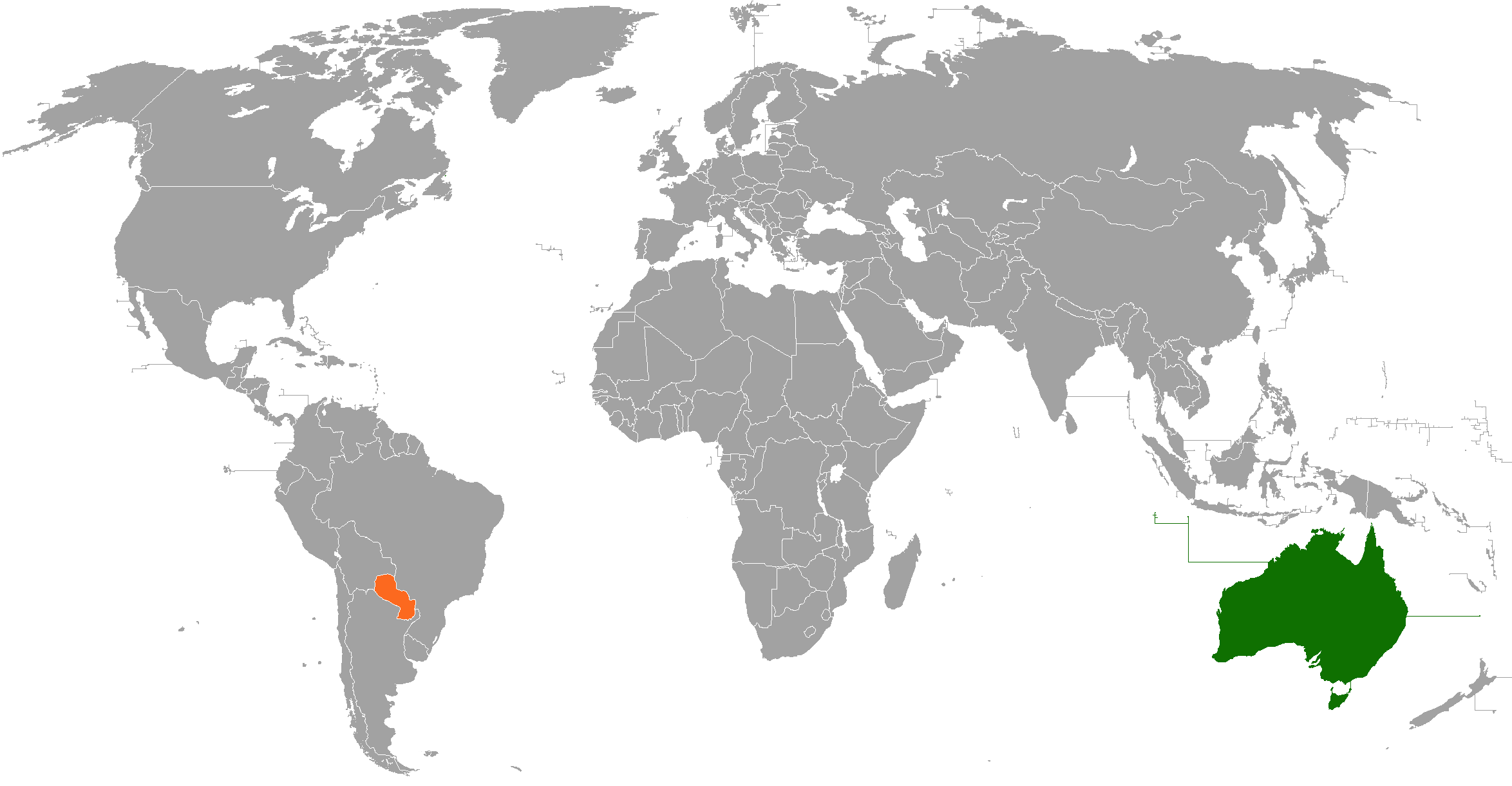

- Australia: Paraguay

Monthly value of Australian merchandise exports to Paraguay (A$ millions) since 1988

Bilateral relations exist between Australia and Paraguay. Diplomatic relations were established in 1974. Both countries are members of the Cairns Group.

== History ==
Australia and Paraguay established diplomatic relations in 1974, and Australia's first Ambassador to Paraguay, H.A. Dunn, presented credentials on 6 October 1976. A Paraguayan consulate was present in Melbourne in 2008. Diplomatic and consular relations between Australia and Paraguay were re-established were established in 2011. In January 2011, Australia opened an honorary consulate in the city of Asunción, with official Yan Speranza, also executive director of the Moises Bertoni Foundation in Paraguay, acting within his capacity as consul. The honorary consulate provides limited consular services to Australians in Paraguay. September 2011, when Paraguay opened an embassy in Canberra, with diplomats Esteban Bedoya and Yuli Kujawa present until 2014.

== Cultural relations ==
The most notable event between Australia and Paraguay was the establishment of New Australia a utopian socialist settlement in Paraguay founded by the Australian New Australian Movement. This movement was founded by William Lane. Lane recruited 220 shearers, stockmen and unionists and sailed from Sydney in July 1893 for Paraguay. At the time, the Paraguayan government was keen to get Australian migration to boost the population of young men to rebuild the population and boost the local economy and the Government had offered the group a large area of good land. The colony was officially founded on 28 September 1893 as Colonia Nueva Australia and comprised 238 adults and children.

== Trade ==
Bilateral trade between Australia and Paraguay is small, reflecting on deals happening at times rather than continuous arrangements of supply. In 2013–14, two-way merchandise trade totaled AUD$3.4 million, of which AUD$1.3 million were Australian exports, made up mainly of paper and paper products, civil engineering equipment and machine tools for working metal. Australia's major import from Paraguay (2013–14) was oil-seeds and oleaginous fruits. In December 2009, P&O Maritime Services acquired a 70 per cent stake in the Dos Santos Group Bulk Barging business, a river navigation business based in Asunción. P&O's head office is based in Melbourne and the company maintains operations in five Australian ports. There may be some openings for investment in the agribusiness sector and for the export of agriculture related and other products and services from Australia. The mining industry in Paraguay has, to date, been relatively underdeveloped but the recent discovery of one of the world's three largest deposits of ilmenite (a titanium ore) has the potential to greatly expand mining in the country. Australian companies with existing interests in Argentina, Brazil and Uruguay may find that the close commercial ties that these countries have with Paraguay may facilitate entry into the Paraguayan market. In 2011, the Paraguayan-Australian Chamber of Commerce was formed. This organisation works closely with the Australian Embassy in Buenos Aires to facilitate and encourage trade and investment between the two countries.

== High level visits ==
- April 2013 – An Australian parliamentary delegation led by then Speaker Anna Burke visited Paraguay.
- May 2014 – Paraguay was represented at the 2014 Latin America Down Under Mining Conference in Sydney by an official from its Ministry of Mines and Energy.

== Diplomatic missions ==
- Australia is accredited to Paraguay from its embassy in Buenos Aires, Argentina.
- Paraguay has a consulate-general in Sydney.

== See also ==
- Australian Paraguayan
- Foreign relations of Australia
- Foreign relations of Paraguay
