= 1969 Paraguay plan =

Failed Israeli plan to encourage Palestinian emigration to Paraguay

The Paraguay Plan, also known as the Paraguay Scheme, was a plan conducted by the Israeli government led by Golda Meir with the intention to encourage the emigration of up to 60,000 Palestinians from the Gaza Strip to Paraguay in the 1960s and 1970s. The plan failed with only a small percentage of the planned number making the journey.

== History ==
=== Paraguay's motivation ===
At the time, Paraguay was governed by the authoritarian regime of Alfredo Stroessner, which had agreed to cooperate with the proposal in 1967. Paraguayan authorities reportedly viewed the potential migrants as desirable settlers due to the country's demand for labor and a perception that, as predominantly Muslims, they would be unlikely to sympathize with communist movements.

=== Israel's plan ===
The initiative emerged in the aftermath of the Six-Day War, during which Israel occupied Gaza with a substantial Palestinian population Israel wanted to systematically remove, in addition to the Sinai peninsula, East Jerusalem, Golan Heights, and the West Bank. Under the plan, Palestinians in Gaza were enticed to move to Paraguay by "travel agencies" set up in Gaza to promote emigration to Paraguay; those who moved to Paraguay would be given a one-time lump sum of $100, while the Paraguayan government would be paid $33 per Palestinian it accepted, and after five years of residency they were to become eligible for a path to citizenship. Israel would also pay $350,000 to cover the costs for 10,000 Palestinians, meaning the total cost to pay by Israel was $33 million.

Zvi Zamir, the director of Mossad at the time, stated that Paraguay would be willing to accept "60,000 Muslim Arabs who are not communists, according to their definition" and recommended that if the Palestinians were not absorbed and assimilated in the country or caused a scandal related to the deal, Israel should accept them back.

=== Failure of the plan ===
While estimates of the exact number of Palestinians sent to Paraguay due to the project vary, ranging from "a few dozen" to "thousands", it is widely agreed that the project was a failure, with the number that made the trip being only a small percent of the 60,000 Palestinians in Gaza, around 30 people, the Israeli and Paraguayan governments intended to reach. However, upon arrival, having been left in the country with few resources and with no guarantee of employment, they became destitute. Many of those that went had been lured in with false promises of becoming landowners and receiving further financial support, leading to additional frustration.

=== Aftermath ===
On 4 May 1970, two armed Palestinians, Khaled Derwish Kassab and Talal al-Demasi, who were transferred from Gaza previously, stormed the Israeli embassy in Paraguay, with the goal of killing the Israeli ambassador to Paraguay at the time, Benjamin Varon. The attack ended up killing Edna Peer, the secretary of the ambassador as well as injuring Varon. Two years later, Kassab and al-Demasi, who turned out to be members of the Palestine Liberation Organization, were sentenced to 13 years in prison by a Paraguayan court.

== See also ==
- Israel–Paraguay relations
- Madagascar plan
- New Australia, Utopian colony in Paraguay
- Bhasan Char
