= Gilbert Casey =

Australian trade unionist and utopian (1856–1946)

Gilbert Stephen Casey
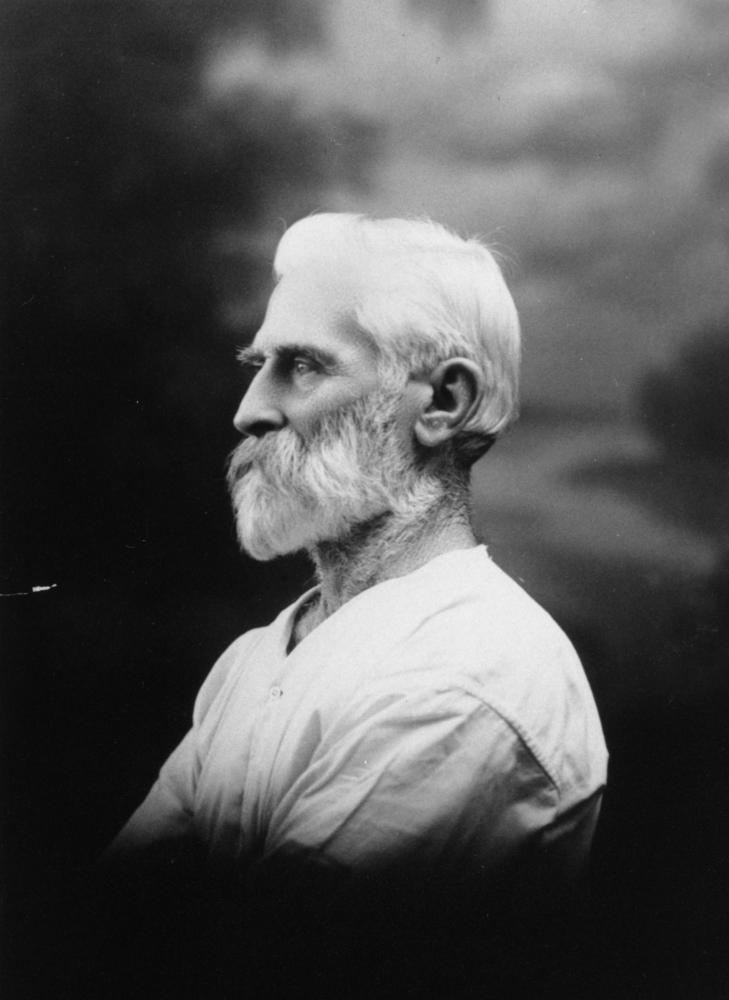
- Casey in 1924
- Born: 1856; County Clare, Ireland
- Died: October 2, 1946; New Australia, Paraguay
- Occupations: Trade unionist; labour organiser
- Known for: Organising the Australian Labour Federation; leadership of the New Australia utopian colony
- Title: President, Sociedad Co-operativa Colonizadora Nueva Australia (1896–1900); Chief of police of New Australia
- Movement: New unionism; Utopian socialism
- Spouses: Alice Tighe (m. 1883); Maria Antonia Sosa
- Children: 2

Gilbert Stephen Casey (1856 – 2 October 1946) was a trade unionist, agitator of the early Australian labour movement and a utopian socialist.

== Personal life ==
Gilbert Stephen Casey was born in 1856 in County Clare, Ireland, the son of Patrick Casey, a storeman, and his wife Susan (née O'Dea). With little formal education, Casey went to sea and came into contact with trade unionism. He probably immigrated to Queensland, Australia, in October 1883 and worked as a seaman, bushworker, coalminer and wharflabourer.

On 14 October 1883, Casey married his first wife, Alice Tighe (née Shile), who had already been married twice before. She left him in 1895 in New Australia and he then married Maria Antonia Sosa, a Paraguayan woman.

With Maria and their two sons, Casey raised cattle at La Novia, "dabbled in sidelines" at Asunción, and wrote occasional letters and articles for the Australian Labor press. Casey was for many years the chief of police at New Australia, until he died on 2 October 1946 in New Australia, Paraguay.

== Political life ==
In February 1886, Casey was associated with the Queensland Maritime Council through the Brisbane Wharf Labourers' Union which he helped form the previous year. In 1888 the council sent him on an organizing mission to Maryborough, Bundaberg, Rockhampton, Mackay and Townsville; there he helped to found the Townsville Trades and Labor Council (T.L.C.).

As a member of the Brisbane Trades and Labour Council, Casey became a trustee for the Brisbane Trades Hall reserve, worked for the June 1889 reconstitution of the council into the Australian Labour Federation (A.L.F), and became a member of its central district council.

In December 1889, along with Thomas Glassey and Albert Hinchcliffe, Casey successfully went to and brought the bush unions into the A.L.F. Casey was appointed as a full-time A.L.F. organiser in April 1890 and in his first frenetic three months organized new unions and established district councils of the A.L.F. at Maryborough, Rockhampton, Charters Towers and Townsville. In February 1890 Casey was appointed the first chairman of the board of trustees of the Worker.

After the first Australian banks and economy crisis of 1890 and the defeat of the Australian unions in the 1890 maritime strike, and 1891 shearers' strike, he preferred a general strike over Australia when more pragmatic union leaders wanted to negotiate a return to work, lest the defeats are turned into a rout. His extremism attracted attacks by anti-labor forces.

In the newspaper the Judge, he was accused of incest and, in subsequent libel action, he was awarded contemptuous damages which did not cover costs. In Barcaldine, he was accused during the shearers' strike in 1891 of arson and jailed for two weeks before he was discharged without the charge being heard.

Casey was a self-proclaimed evangelist for the 'new unionism', believing it would radically transform existing society, which he saw as dominated by "those who rob legally, those who rob illegally and those who it pays to maintain the law". After the failed shearers' strike in 1891, he found it hard to accept the A.L.F's support for the founding of the Australian Labor Party because he felt it would be easy prey for "wirepullers".

== New Australia ==
He became a fervent member of William Lane's New Australia Co-operative Settlement Association, which had set itself the goal to establish a utopia at New Australia, South America. Casey donated his Brisbane home as a prize in a fund-raising raffle and left on 31 December 1893 with his wife with the second group of settlers on the ship Royal Tar Australia on the way to New Australia in Paraguay.

He remained in the Australian colony of New Australia even after it split, returning to Australia briefly in 1894 to try to obtain further support for the colony. He was elected president of the Sociedad Co-operativa Colonizadora Nueva Australia in 1896, though the colony's income improved rapidly after he was replaced by James Craig Kennedy in 1900. He was the police chief of New Australia until he died on 2 October 1946.
