= Nueva Londres =

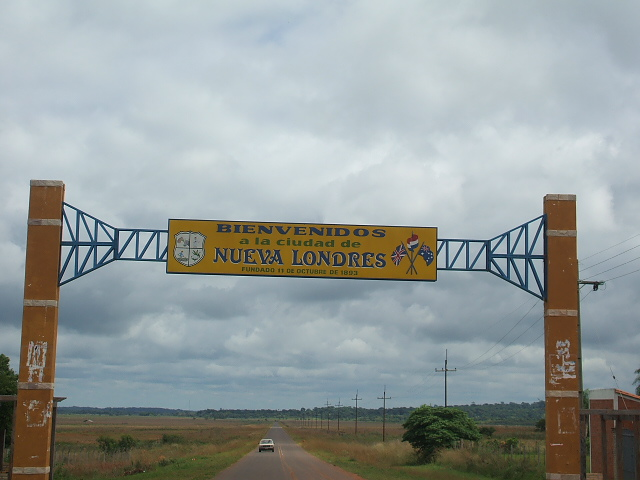
- Town entrance

- Location within Paraguay
- Coordinates: 25°25′12″S 56°31′48″W
- Country: Paraguay
- Department: Caaguazú

Area
  - Total: 883 km^{2} (341 sq mi)

Population (2022)
  - Total: 3,594
  - Density: 4.07/km^{2} (10.5/sq mi)
- Time zone: UTC-4

Nueva Londres (Spanish pronunciation: [ˈnweβa ˈlondɾes], lit. 'New London') is a town southwest in the Caaguazú Department of Paraguay.

== History ==
In 1893, two thousand men and women led by William Lane left Australia for Paraguay where they established a utopian socialist colony called "New Australia". The colony was not a success, but their descendants can be found just over 200km from Foz do Iguaçu. Among the settlers were Richard Smith and John Smith.

In October 1957, the town was recognized as a district, and after a request to be renamed New Canberra was ignored by the Australian Government, the town was renamed Nueva Londres (Spanish for New London).

== Geography ==
Nueva Londres has an area of 883 square kilometers and is located 137 km from the city of Asunción.

=== Climate ===
The average temperature in Nueva Londres is 22°C, with a low reaches 0°C in the winter and the maximum is 32°C. The climate is mild with abundant rainfall.

== Demography ==
According to the census of 2002, Nueva Londres had 3,875 inhabitants.

== Transportation ==
The town is primarily accessed by car, with national route PY02 passing 8 km (5 mi) south of the city and PY08 12 km (7 mi) east of it.

== Economy ==
The main activities of the inhabitants are livestock and agriculture.

== See also ==
- Australia–Paraguay relations
- Foreign relations of Australia
- Foreign relations of Paraguay
- Confederados - Brazilians descended from Confederate Americans who fled the United States to Brazil after the American Civil War
- New Australia

== Sources ==
- World Gazeteer: Paraguay – World-Gazetteer.com
