= Ayvu Rapyta =

Book

Ayvu Rapyta: Textos míticos de los Mbyá-Guaraní del Guairá
- Author: León Cadogan
- Language: Mbya Guarani and Spanish
- Genre: Folklore, Religious Texts
- Publisher: Faculdade de Filosofia, Ciências e Letras da Universidade de São Paulo
- Publication date: 1959 (first published)
- Publication place: São Paulo, Brazil

Ayvu Rapyta is a book written in the Mbya Guarani language with Spanish translation of mythical texts compiled by Paraguayan anthropologist León Cadogan. Cadogan records the myths and religious tradition of the Mbyá Guaraní of the Guairá Department of Paraguay as told him by, among others, Cacique Pablo Vera.

The book's full title is Ayvu Rapyta: Textos míticos de los Mbyá-Guaraní del Guairá and was first published in 1959. It is considered to be one of the most fundamental works on the Guarani people.

One of the most important concepts explained in this work is that of the founding of the human language or the "Ayvu Rapyta." The father, Ñamandu, by virtue of his creative wisdom, or kuaarara, conceived the origins of the human tongue even before the existence of the world.

The book also chronicles the plans of various other spirits to create the first earth (Yvy Tenonde) which was later destroyed by flood to be replaced by the new earth (Yvy Pyaú). Also explained is the origin of all living persons and their word-souls (Ñe'êy).

Cadogan also compiled from his Mbyá associates various songs, prayers and rites essential to indigenous religious life as well as their ethical customs.

The first chapters were translated by Cadogan himself and were first published in 2013 by Peter Lambert and Andrew Nickson. Numerous translations and retranslations (some with significant errors), as well as a plagiarism accusation made by Bartomeu Melià against Pierre Clastres, sparked much debate. However, to this day, there is no complete translation into English.
