= León Cadogan =

Paraguayan ethnologist

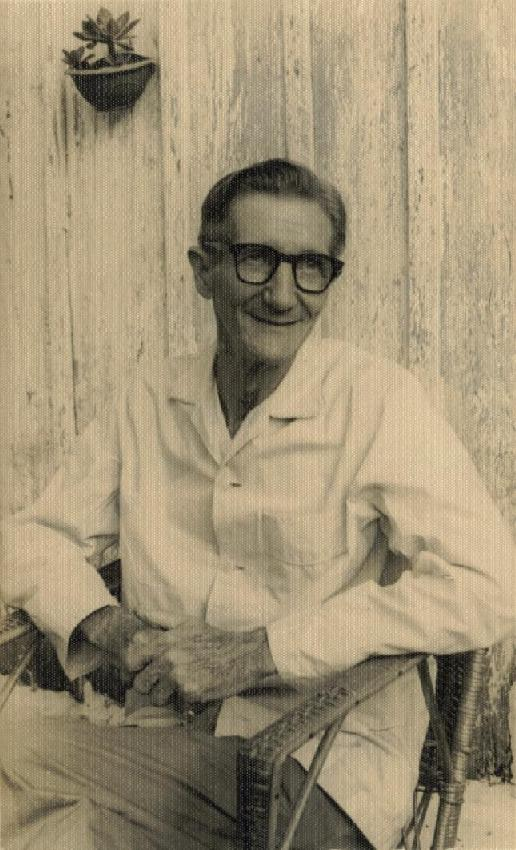

Background information
- Born: León Cadogan; 29 July 1899; Asunción, Paraguay
- Died: 30 May 1973 (aged 73) Asunción, Paraguay
- Occupations: Anthropologist, Ethnologist

León Cadogan (29 July 1899 – 30 May 1973) was a Paraguayan ethnologist who made significant contributions to the study of Guaraní language and culture.

== Childhood and studies ==
León Cadogan was born in Asunción a few months after his Australian parents, John Cadogan (Welsh origin) and Rose Stone (Polish father and Irish mother) who previously used the name Rose Summerfield by her first marriage, came to Paraguay as part of a group of a few hundred people who migrated there in 1893 and 1894. Led by the mercurial and stridently racist William Lane, the group created New Australia (near the town of Coronel Oviedo), a utopian colony espousing socialism, teetotalism and the ethnocentrism that had already produced an official White Australia policy in their homeland. The New Australia colony soon collapsed in dissension, and its members obtained freehold land instead.

A fire in his parents' home in 1904 forced the Cadogan family to leave the colony. They settled in Villarrica, a town with a German-speaking population substantial enough to warrant a newspaper, Villarrica-Actual, that publishes in Spanish and German. Attending that city's German-language school, León, who had previously learned English, Spanish, and Guaraní, learned German as well.

He was 18 when he began working as a clerk for the cold-storage facilities of Swift & Co.'s slaughterhouse in the Zevallos Cué barrio of Asunción. Through a friendship struck up with the Frenchman Emile Lelieur, he learned French and gained the opportunity to read classic authors, to learn elementary mathematics and the use of logarithms.

In 1919 he moved to Buenos Aires, and two years later his restless spirit led him to the jungles of Caaguazú, where he worked harvesting yerba maté. Absorbed by the rugged and primitive environment, he became interested in the life of the Guaraní people. Cadogan studied, published and became an authority on Mbyá Guaraní, Ava-Guaraní, Pai-tavytera, and Ache-guayaki — various Guaraní tribes living in the forests of eastern Paraguay.

Cadogan was accepted as a member of the Mbya-Guaraní and initiated under the spiritual name of "Tupa Kuchubi Veve" ("One who flies like a whirlwind"). The Mbya-Guarani had a secret, esoteric religious language unknown to the world until his initiation. Following the traditions of the group, he kept this name secret until his death.

Cadogan published several studies of the language, religion and culture of the Guaraní, becoming a recognized authority of this group. One of his most famous works is Ayvu Rapyta, a collection of religious traditions of the Mbya-Guarani. His works were published in academic publications in Paraguay, Uruguay, Mexico, Argentina, Brazil, Austria, France and the USA. In 1949 President Felipe Molas López appointed him "Protector of Indians", but he later lost favour with the dictator Alfredo Stroessner who tried to politicize and dismantle the organization protecting the indigenous group.

Cadogan died in 1973 after forty years dedicated to the Guaraní cause and denunciation of the systemic persecution and abuse they had been subjected to. His library was donated to the Catholic University of Asunción. Pursuant to municipal ordinance 9513/76, a street near his home was named after him. Paraguayans consider him one of the 100 most important people of the millennium. Léon Cadogan's son Rodger Cadogan currently heads the Fundación Léon Cadogan, an organization that continues to advance the goals of Paraguay's Guaraní people.

== Major publications ==
- Ayvu Rapyta, Textos miticos de los Mbya-Guarani del Guaira (Boletim No. 227 - Antropologia, No. 5. University of São Paulo, 1959)
- Diccionario Mbya-Guarani Castellano (Biblioteca Paraguaya de Antropologia - Vol. XVII, Fundacion "Leon Cadogan" Ceaduc Cepac. Asunción, 1992)
- Nuevas observaciones acerca del origen de los Guayaki. (Jornadas Internacionales de Arqueologia y Etnografia, Buenos Aires, 1960)

Suplemento Antropológico, Universidad Católica, revista del centro de estudios antropológicos. Vol.XXXIV no.2 diciembre 1999 ISSN 0378-9896 Homenaje a León Cadogan en el centenario de su nacimiento ( Contains Bio-Bibliography of Leon Cadogan)

== Sources ==
- "The Indians of Paraguay." Branislava Súsnik and Miguel Chase-Sardi
- "One Hundred Paraguayans of the Twentieth Century." Fascicules collectibles last minute
