= Londres, Lot-et-Garonne =

Londres is a former commune of France, located in the Lot-et-Garonne department.

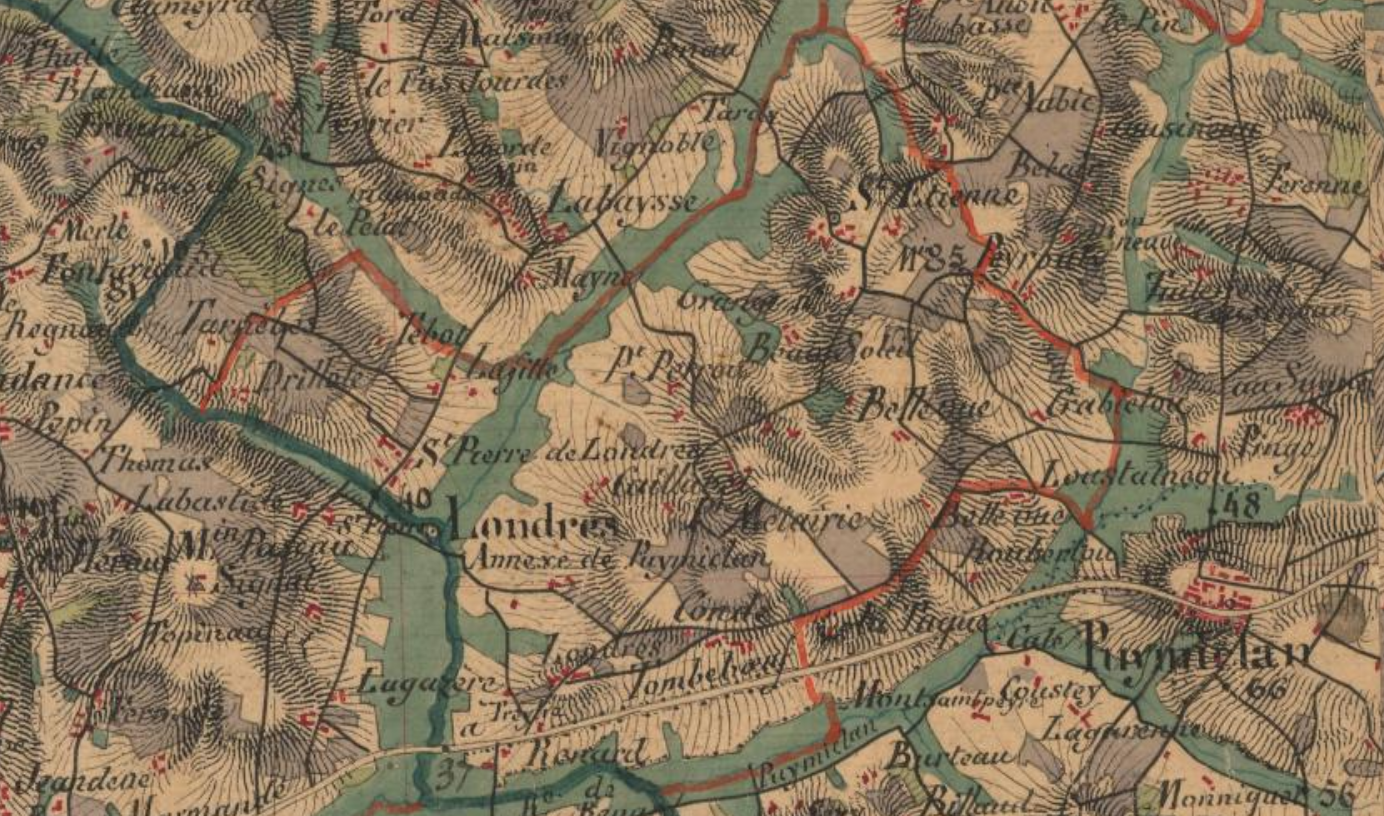
Map of Londres around 1830.

It was annexed by Puymiclan in 1839.
