= Rose Summerfield =

Australian activist (1864–1922)

Rose Anna Summerfield (18 April 1864 – 14 April 1922) also known as Rose Cadogan or Rose Hummer, was a radical feminist and labour activist. She was the mother of prominent Paraguayan ethnologist León Cadogan.

== Early life ==
Summerfield was born in Middleton Creek, Victoria. Her father was a Polish miner, and her mother Irish.

== Political activities ==
Summerfield's political activities began in 1886 when she joined the Australasian Secularist Association. Her interests included socialism, temperance, and women's rights. In the early 1890s, she began writing political pieces for the Democrat, the Liberator, the Northern People, the Hummer and its successor, the Worker (Sydney). By 1892 she was the most prominent organiser of working women in Sydney and in August of that year established a women's division of the Australian Workers' Union.

On 17 July 1892, Summerfield delivered her most famous lecture to a Sunday evening meeting of the Australian Socialist League at Leigh House. In Master and Man, which she also called "the gospel of discontent", she described the respective places of employer and workers under colonial capitalism, and how that would change if rights were afforded to workers. The piece has been described as an expression of narrative identity, identifying her subjective sense of self and alienation with the injustice inflicted upon women and the working class. Like many other radical writings at the time, it was also racist, portraying non-white people as a threat to the white working class.

Summerfield became involved with the Womanhood Suffrage League of New South Wales, establishing a branch in Waverley and serving on its council between 1893 and 1894. She was also active in the temperance movement.

She became disillusioned with Australian workers and labour politics, and she resigned from the Australian Socialist League in the late 1890s. She and her husband left Australia for the utopian socialist settlement New Australia that had been founded in Paraguay by William Lane in 1899.

By 1901, she was dissatisfied with New Australia. She moved with her family in 1908 to nearby Yataity and ran a store.

== Later life and death ==
Summerfield wanted to return to Australia from Paraguay, but her planned return in 1920 was called off when the couple lost their savings in a bank failure.

She died from cancer in Villa Rica, Paraguay, in 1922 and was buried in the Las Ovejas cemetery at New Australia.

== Personal life ==
In 1886, she married Henry Lewis Summerfield, and they moved to Waverley in Sydney. They had one son in 1887.

Henry died in 1890. Her second husband, John Cadogan, whom she married in 1897, was a cook and mine manager; they had four children together. In 1899, in Paraguay, she gave birth to León Cadogan, who made significant contributions to the study of Guaraní language and culture, and is considered one of the most important ethnologists of Paraguay.

== See also ==
- Australian labour movement
