= New Australia =

19th-century Australian settlement in Paraguay

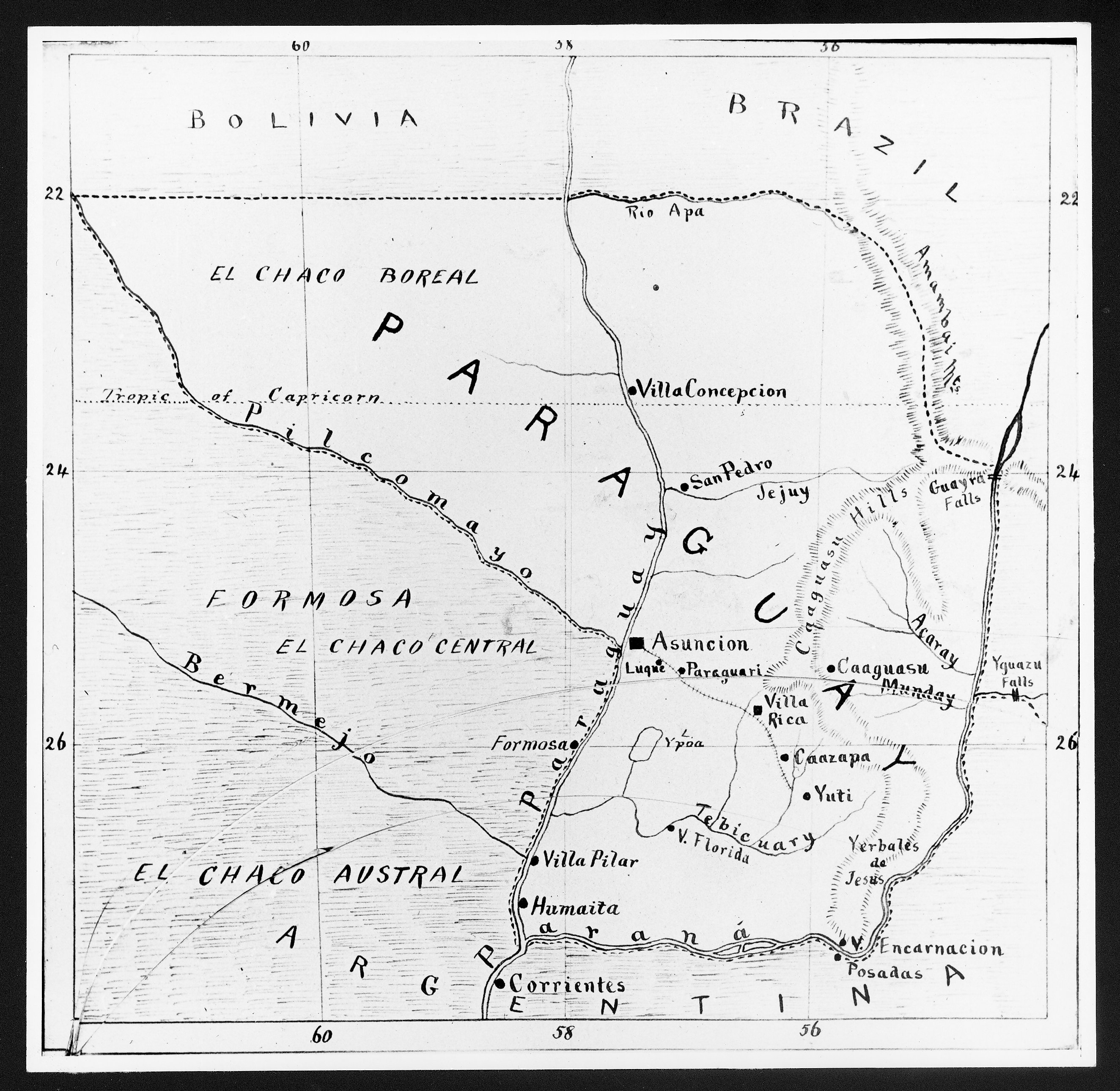
Map of Paraguay, drawn by John Lane, brother of William Lane. New Australia and Cosme were both southeast of Asunción, the capital of Paraguay, Nueva Londres, just northwest of Coronel Oviedo and Cosme, near Villarrica.

New Australia (Spanish: Nueva Australia, pronounced [ˌnweba ausˈtɾalja]) was a utopian socialist settlement in Paraguay created by the New Australian Movement (Spanish: Movimiento Nueva Australia, pronounced [mobiˈmjento ˌnweba ausˈtɾalja]). The colony was officially founded on 28 September 1893 as Colonia Nueva Australia and comprised 238 people.

== History ==
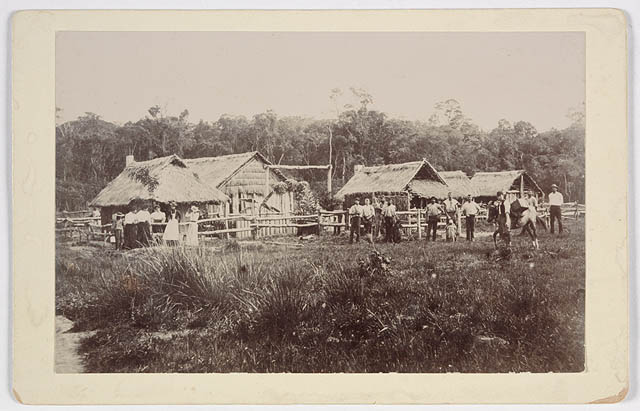
New Australia settlement between 1892 and 1905

The New Australia Co-operative Settlement Association, known in short as the New Australia Movement, was founded by William Lane in 1892. Lane was a prominent figure in the Australian labour movement and had founded Australia's first labour newspaper—The Worker—in 1890. A split in the Australian labour movement between those who went on to form the Australian Labor Party spurred Lane's intent to found a socialist utopia outside Australia. Lane's ideal was to build a society based on:

1. A common-hold, rather than a common-wealth
2. A brotherhood of English-speaking Whites
3. Life marriage
4. Preservation of the "colour line"
5. Teetotalism
6. Communism

His concept of 'common-hold' was that each member of a society should be able to withdraw their proportion of the society's wealth if they chose to leave.

Lane's was not the only influence urging Australians at the time towards a socialist community: utopian Edward Bellamy's Looking Backward was also popular with socialists and led many urban followers of Lane to expect that they would live in luxury in a socialist commune like that of Bellamy's fiction.

Paraguay was chosen as the site of the settlement. Lane recruited many, and the first ship left Sydney in July 1893 for Paraguay, where the government was keen to get European and American settlers and had offered the group a large area of good land. While it is generally agreed that there were some able settlers, there seems to be some dispute about the character of the New Australia settlers as a whole. It has been described as a Cave of Adullam to misfits, failures, and malcontents of the left wing of Australian democracy. Notable Australian individuals who joined the colony included Mary Gilmore, Rose Summerfield, Gilbert Stephen Casey, and George Birks and his family. According to M. de C. Findlay, the Second Secretary of the Legation at Buenos Aires, who was sent to the colony by the British Consul at Asunción, they were, "a fine class of men". Men were required to pay a minimum of £60 (but including all their assets) to join the colony, a sum large enough in 1893 Australia to usually require the selling of a home, so complete failures would have been necessarily excluded.

The founding of the settlement was of interest to left-wing thinkers worldwide: on the subject, Peter Kropotkin said,

The fact that men and women, who have made Australia what it is, are compelled to migrate from it, speaks volumes in itself. 'Make the land, be the dung which renders it productive, build the centres of civilisation which render it valuable — and go away!' That is the true picture of modern capitalist management. The same here, the same at the antipodes — always the same!

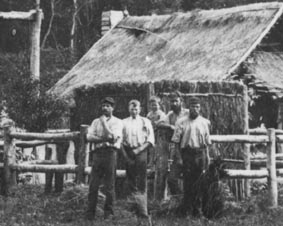
New Australia, Paraguay

One group of settlers came from the Union movement—John Naphthali "Jack" Dias (11 May 1861 – 13 August 1924) and a handful of followers, dispirited after the failure of the 1890 Australian maritime dispute, 1891 Australian shearers' strike, and the 1892 Broken Hill miners' strike, were among those who decided there was no hope for workers in Australia, and under the influence of Lane's oratory joined the cooperative that purchased the ship Royal Tar to take them to Paraguay and "New Australia". According to Voltaire Molesworth, who was brought to the colony by his father as an infant, a farewell gathering was held at the Sydney Domain prior to the departure of Royal Tar. The meeting was chaired by future prime minister Chris Watson and also featured an address by William Holman, with Watson reportedly speaking of "the workingman's paradise to be established in the hinterland of tropical America".

There was conflict among the settlers from the beginning over prohibition of alcohol, relations with the locals, and Lane's leadership: "I can't help feeling that the movement cannot result in success if that incompetent man Lane continues to mismanage so utterly as he has done up to the present," wrote colonist Tom Westwood. Problems intensified after a second group of colonists arrived in 1894. Dissension caused a rift in the colony, and in May 1894, Lane and 58 others left New Australia to found Cosme, a new colony 72 kilometres farther south. Eventually, New Australia was dissolved as a cooperative by the government of Paraguay, and each settler was given their own piece of land.

Some colonists founded communes elsewhere in Paraguay, others went home to Australia or on to England; some 2,000 descendants of the New Australia colonists still live in Paraguay.

The 1997 book Paradise Mislaid by Anne Whitehead is about the colonists and their descendants today. There is also a fictional retelling of the story by Michael Wilding, called The Paraguayan Experiment. The classic account is historian Gavin Souter's A Peculiar People, written in 1968.

== In popular culture ==
The story of New Australia was dramatised in the 1947 stage play Hail Tomorrow, by Vance Palmer.

The title track of the band Redgum's second album, Virgin Ground, tells the story of the founding of New Australia.

== Notable people ==
- William Lane (1861–1917, founder, journalist)
- Gilbert Casey (1856–1946, co-founder, chief of police)
- Rose Summerfield (1864–1922)
- León Cadogan (1899–1973, ethnologist, raised in New Australia)
- Robin Wood (1944–2021, comics writer, born in New Australia)
- James Murdoch (orientalist)

== See also ==
- Nueva Londres
- Nueva Germania
- Australian Paraguayan
- 1969 Paraguay plan
