= Swart gevaar =

Term used during apartheid in South Africa

Swart gevaar (Afrikaans for "black danger") was a term used during apartheid in South Africa to refer to the perceived security threat of the majority black African population to the white South African government. It was used by the Herenigde Nasionale Party in the 1948 general election to promote the Sauer Commission's recommendation of apartheid.

== See also ==
- Rooi gevaar ("red threat")
- White genocide conspiracy theory
- Red Scare
- Yellow Peril
- Demographic threat
- Settler colonialism
