= St. Louis Ramblers =

St. Louis Rambler Rugby Club
- Full name: St. Louis Rambler Rugby Club
- Union: Missouri Rugby Football Union
- Founded: 1932
- Ground(s): Forest Park, St. Louis, Missouri, United States
- President: Colin Heath
- Coach(es): Colin Heath
- League(s): Missouri RFU, Division III
Team kit

The St. Louis Ramblers Rugby Football Club is a division II rugby union team based out of St. Louis, Missouri, United States. It is part of the Missouri Rugby Football Union as well as the Western Rugby Football Union.

== History ==
In 1932 Edmond St. John Martin Hoogewerf arrived in St. Louis from Great Britain to become a history professor at St. Louis University. While in St. Louis he met Harry Langenberg, a founding member of the Princeton Rugby Club, where they eventually came together to form the Ramblers Rugby Club in 1933.

The Ramblers are St. Louis’ oldest and the nation’s second oldest active men’s rugby club.

The Ramblers green and white uniform was adopted sometime between 1947 and 1950.

Ramblers have toured to play on six of the seven continents including Europe, Asia, South America, Africa, and Australia. In total the ramblers have been to over 20 countries. Most recently in celebration of their seventy-fifth year they traveled to Nevada to play against the Las Vegas Blackjacks RFC.
