= The Worker (Brisbane) =

Former Australian newspaper

- Official journal of the Federated Workers of Queensland
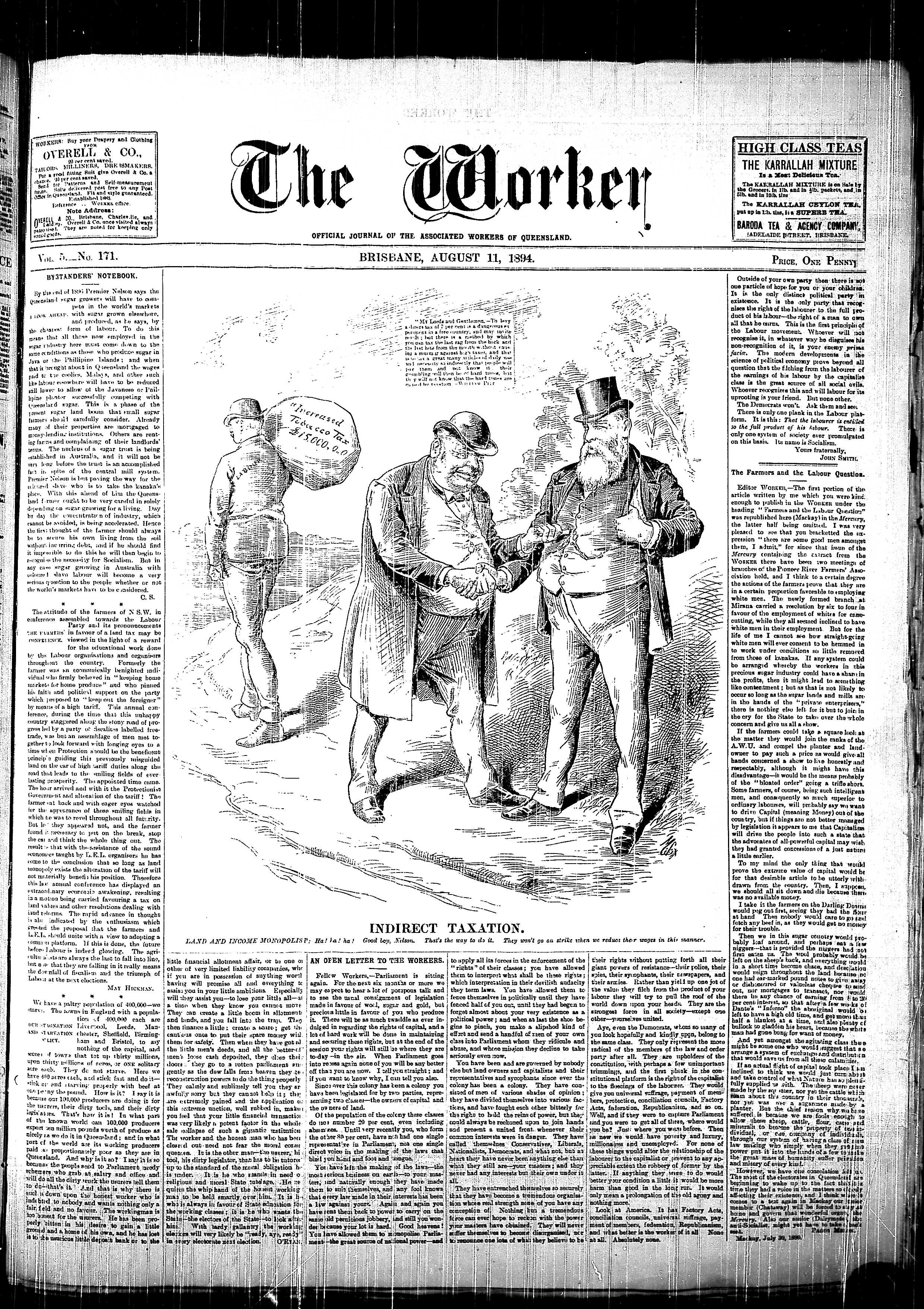
- Front page of The Worker, 11 August 1894
- Type: Weekly
- Format: Broadsheet
- Founder: William Lane
- Publisher: Trades and Labour Council; Queensland Labor Party; Australian Workers' Union
- Editor: William Lane (1890–1892); Ernest Blackwell (1892–1893); William Higgs (1893–1899); Frank Kenna (1899–1901); Henry Boote (1901–1911); Charlie Seymour (1911–1915); Jack Hanlon (1915–1943)
- Notable contributors: Henry Lawson; Mary Gilmore; Claude Marquet; Florence Baverstock; Francis Adams; Jim Grahame; Roderic Quinn; Muriel Agnes Heagney
- Founded: March 1, 1890
- Ceased publication: August 19, 1974
- Headquarters: Dunstan House, 232-240 Elizabeth Street, Brisbane (1929–1974)
- City: Brisbane
- Country: Australia
- Price: One penny (1890); Twopence (1920)
- Sister newspapers: The Australian Worker; The Westralian Worker

The Worker was a newspaper published in Brisbane, Queensland, Australia between 1890 and 1974. It was affiliated with the Australian Labor Party and the Trades and Labour Council.

== History ==
The newspaper was first published as Vol. 1, no. 1 on 1 March 1890 and the last issue was Vol. 85, no. 4119 on 19 August 1974. It was originally known as The Australian Workman, and later as The Brisbane Worker. While the official title of the newspaper is The worker : monthly journal of the Associated Workers of Queensland, from 1896 the subtitle was changed to Official journal of the Federated Workers of Queensland. Between 1917 and 1918 the subtitle was Australia's pioneer co-operative labor journal.

== Digitisation ==
The paper has been digitised as part of the Australian Newspapers Digitisation Program of the National Library of Australia.

== Gallery ==
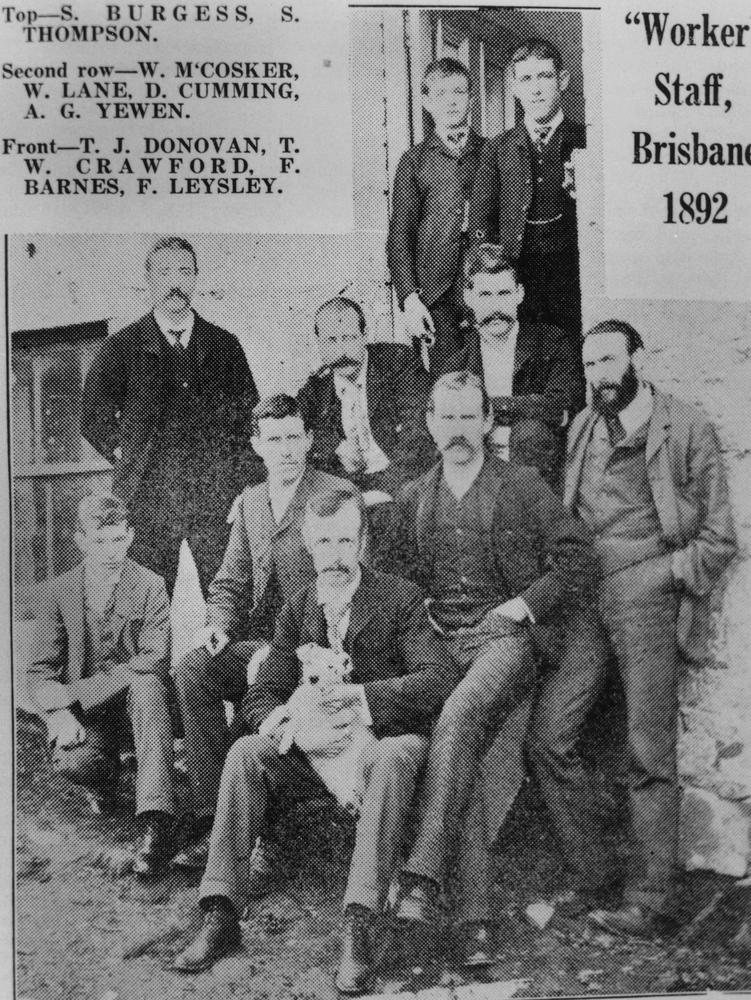
Staff of The Worker, 1892

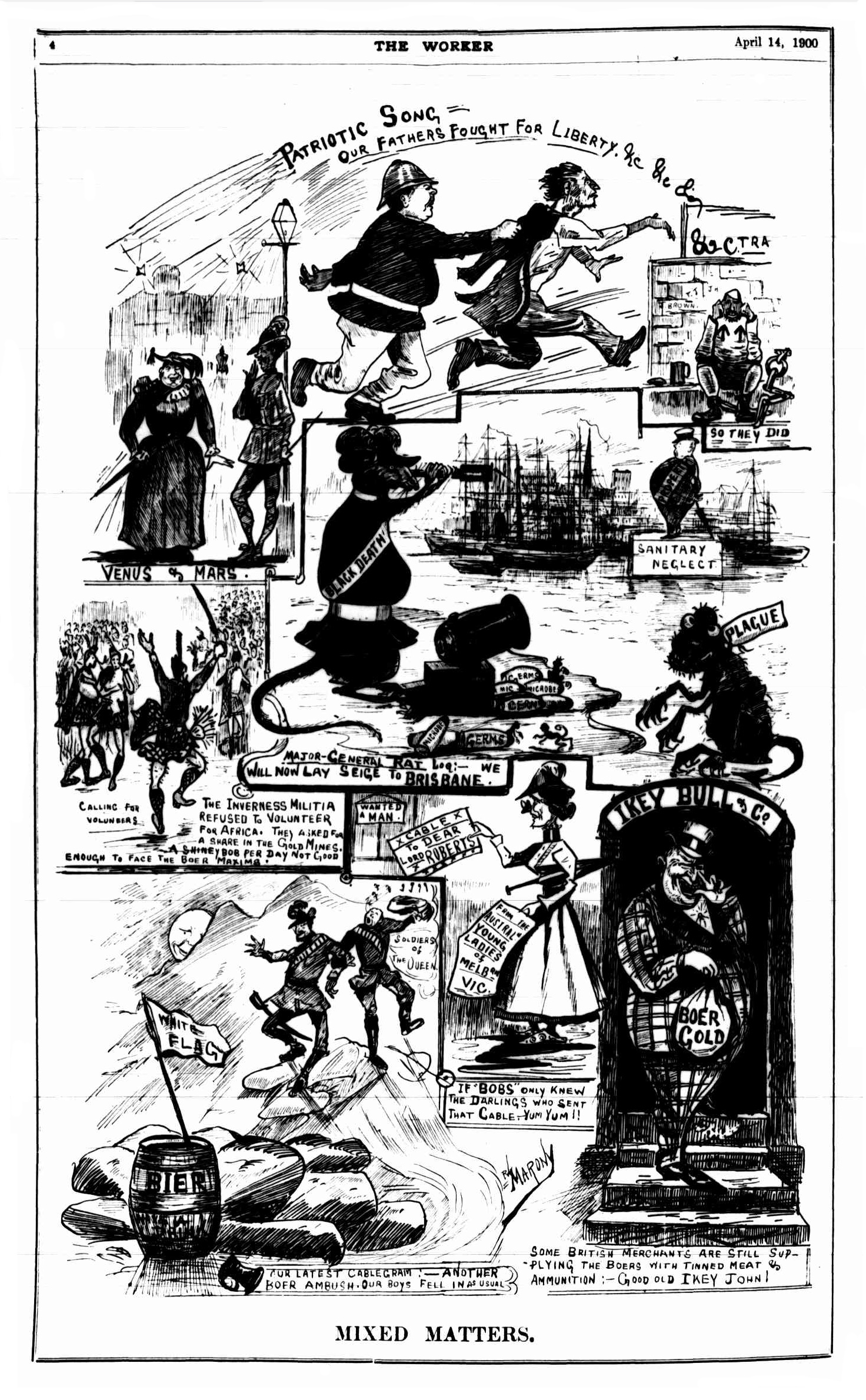
Social commentary illustration by Patrick William Marony in April 1900, depicting (among other subjects) the Second Boer War

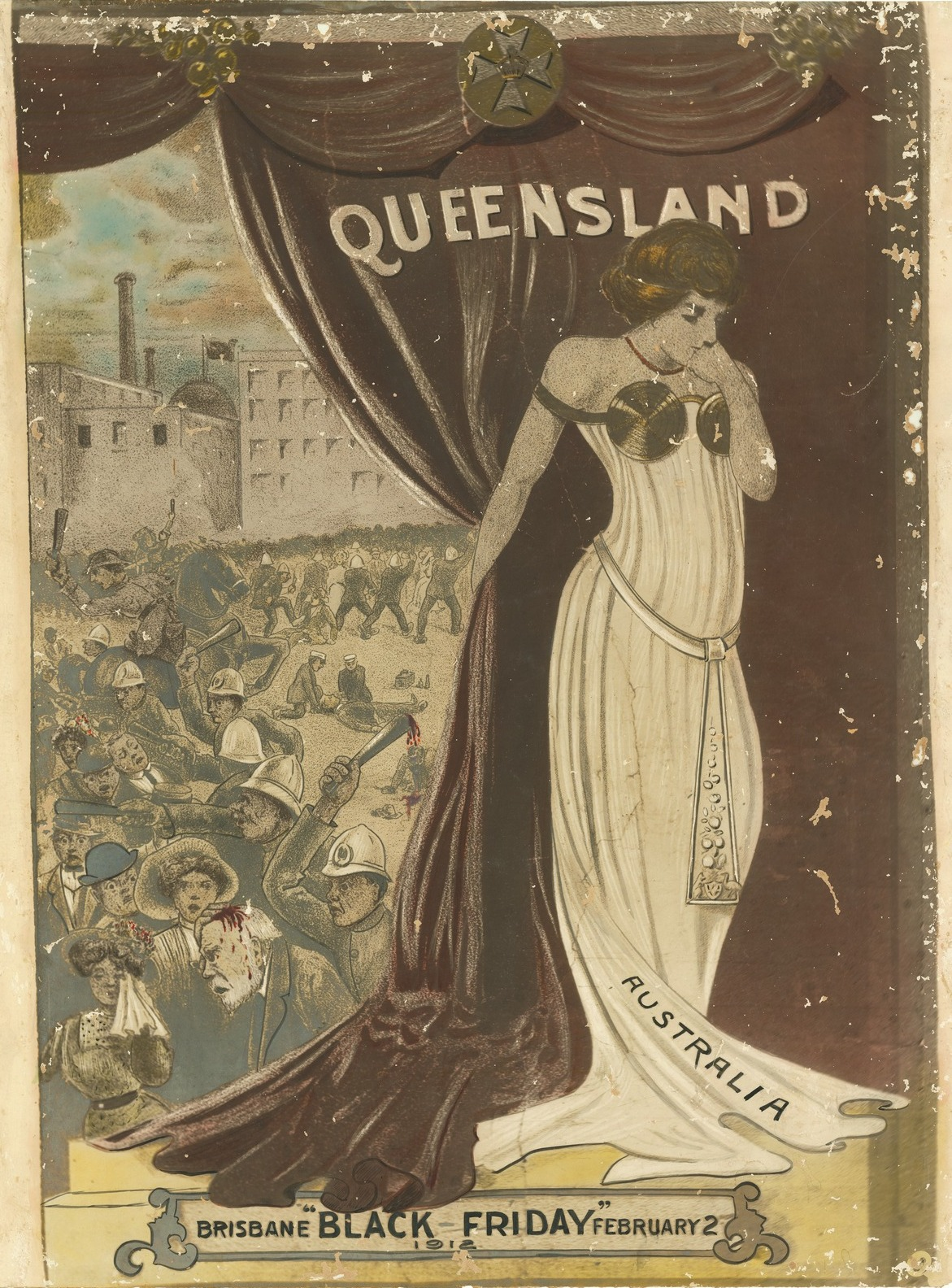
Illustration published in February 12 1912 condemning the behaviour of the Queensland Police during the 1912 Brisbane General Strike

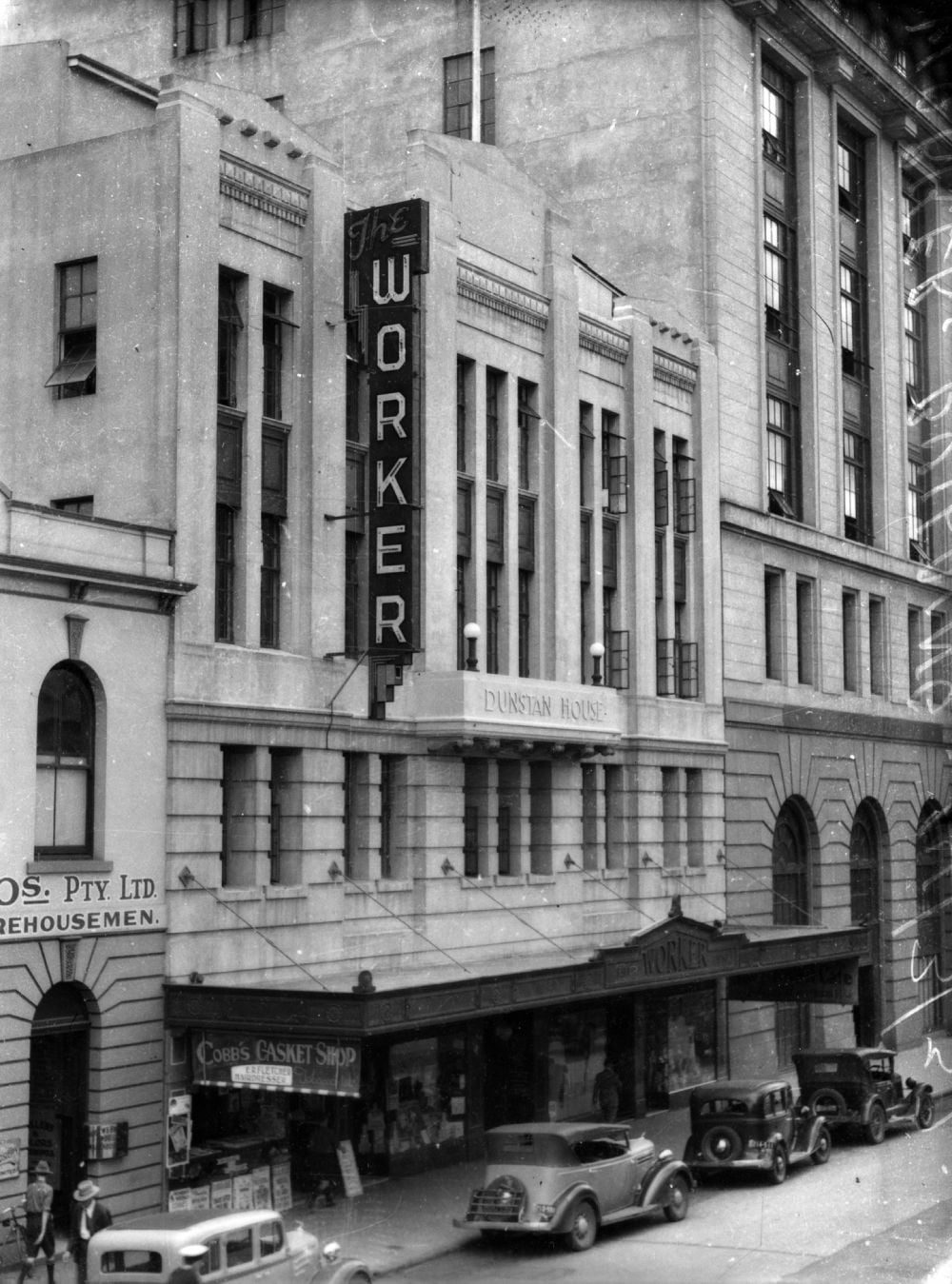
Dunstan House, Brisbane, location of the Worker ca. 1937

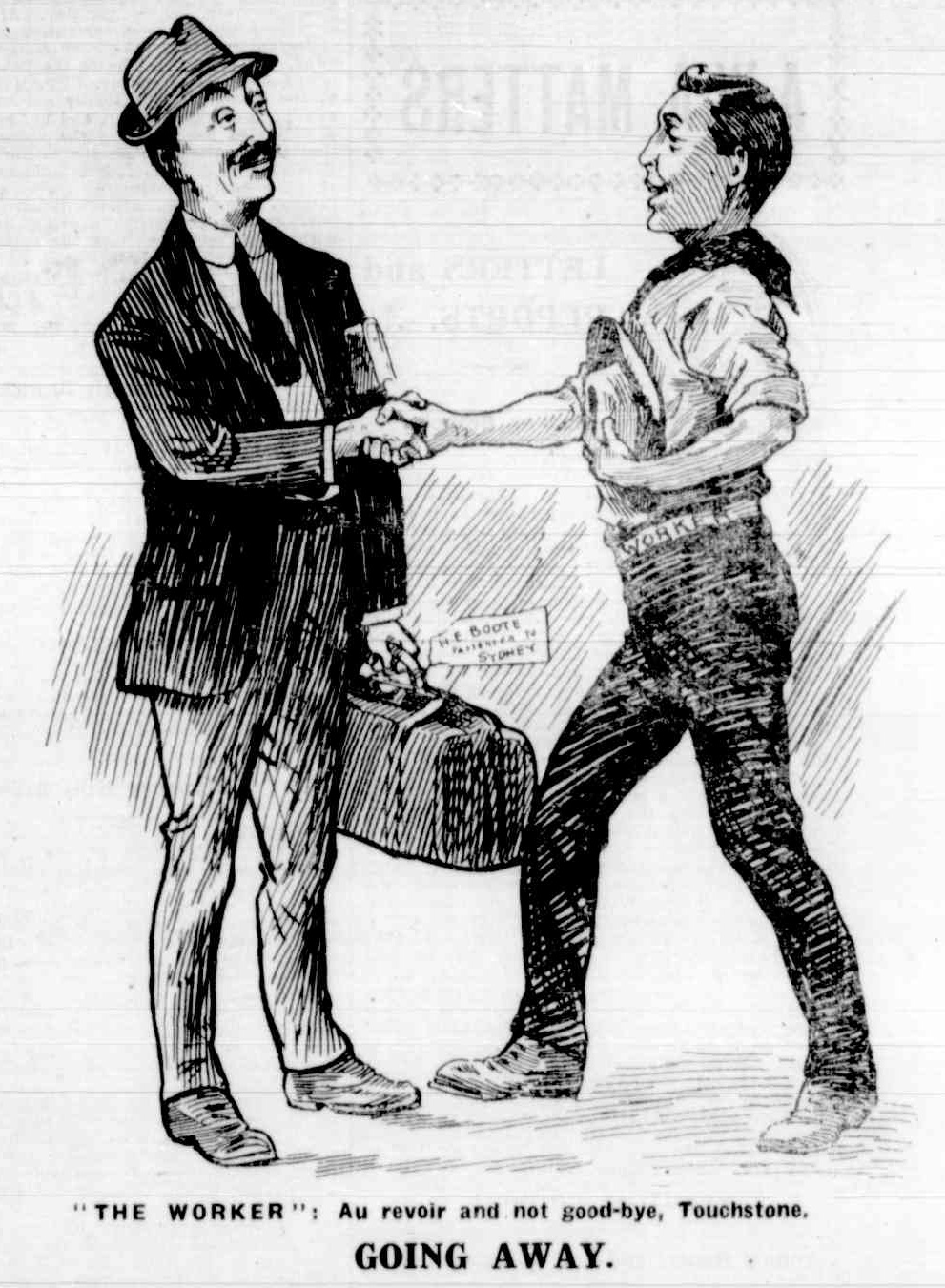
A cartoon depicting the departure of editor Henry E. Boote, published in The Worker, 1 April 1911

== See also ==
- The Daily Standard (1912–1936), another Brisbane-based trade union newspaper
- The Australian Worker (1890–1950), a New South Wales newspaper published by the Australian Workers' Union
- Westralian Worker (1900–1951), a Western Australian labour movement newspaper
