= William Lane =

English journalist and author

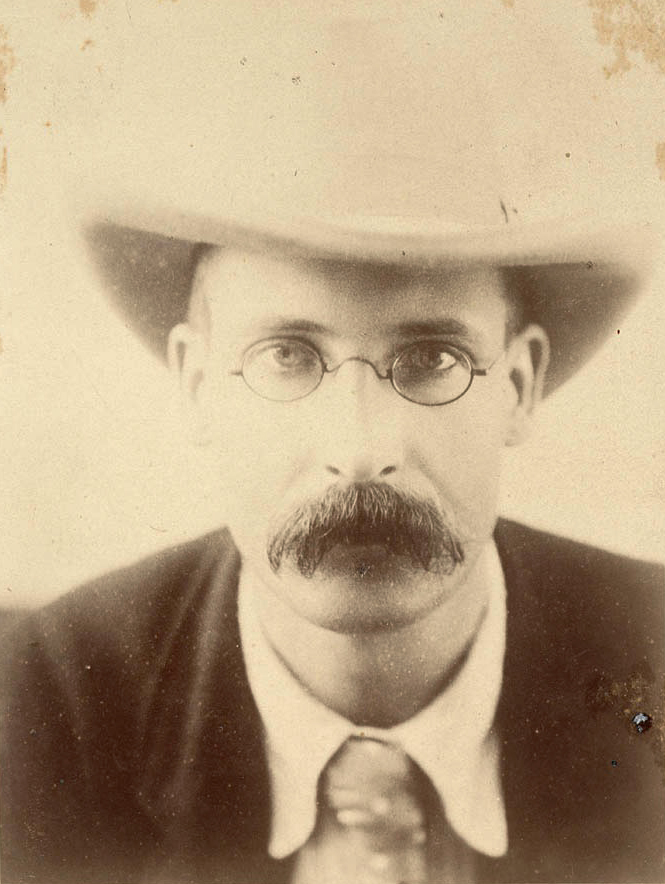
- Portrait of William Lane, 1890-1894
- Born: 6 September 1861; Bristol, Gloucestershire, England, United Kingdom
- Died: 26 August 1917 (aged 55); Auckland, New Zealand
- Occupations: Journalist, author, co-founder of New Australia
- Known for: Journalism, political advocacy

William Lane (6 September 1861 – 26 August 1917) was an English-born journalist, author, advocate of Australian labour politics and a utopian socialist ideologue.

Lane was born in Bristol, England into an impoverished family. After showing great skill in his education, he worked his way into Canada as first a linotype operator, then as a reporter for the Detroit Free Press where he would later meet his future wife Ann Lane, née Macquire. After settling in Australia with his wife and child, as well as his brother John, he became active in the Australian labour movement, founding the Australian Labour Federation and becoming a prolific journalist for the movement. He authored works covering topics such as labour rights and white nationalism.

After becoming disillusioned with the state of Australian politics following an ideological split in the labour movement, he and a group of utopian acolytes (among them influential writer and poet Mary Gilmore) moved to Paraguay in 1892 to found New Australia, with the intention of building a new society on the foundations of his utopian ideals. Following disagreement with the colony regarding the legality of miscegenation and alcohol consumption, he left to found the nearby colony Cosme (also known as Colonia Cosme) in May 1894, and later abandoned the project altogether in 1899.

Upon resettling in New Zealand, he continued his journalistic endeavours until his death in August 1917. After his death he was both celebrated as a champion of utopian socialism, and condemned as the arrogant leader of a failed new society. Due to his radical politics and his extensive journalistic career, he remains a controversial figure in Australian history.

== Early life ==
Lane was born in Bristol, England on 6 September 1861, as the eldest son of James Lane, an Irish Protestant landscape gardener, and his English wife Caroline, née Hall. Lane was born with a debilitating clubfoot, a condition that would be partially corrected in Montreal later in life, leaving him with a limp. Lane's father James was a drunkard when Lane was born, but he improved his circumstances and became an employer.

The young Lane was educated at Bristol Grammar School. At age 16 he migrated to Canada where he worked odd jobs such as a linotype operator. During this time he began engrossed in the writings of economist Henry George and socialist Edward Bellamy. In 1881 by the age of 24 he became a reporter for the Detroit Free Press, where he would meet his future wife Ann Macquire whom he would marry on 22 July 1883.

== Radical journalism in Australia ==
In 1885 William and Ann Lane, along with brother John, as well as their first child migrated on the Quetta to Brisbane, Australia, where Lane immediately got work as a feature writer for the weekly newspaper Queensland Figaro, then as a columnist for the newspapers Brisbane Courier and the Evening Telegraph, using a number of pseudonyms (Lucinda Sharpe, which some consider to be the work of Lane's spouse; William Wilcher; and Sketcher).

Lane's childhood experiences as the son of a drunkard fashioned him into a lifelong abstainer from alcohol. In 1886 he created an Australia-wide sensation by spending a night in the Brisbane lock-up disguised as a drunk, and subsequently reporting the conditions of the cells as "Henry Harris". Lane's father was a drunk who impoverished the family.

With the growth of the Australian labour movement, Lane's columns under the Sketcher pseudonym, especially his "Labour Notes" in the Evening Telegraph, began to increasingly promote labourist philosophy. Lane himself began to attend meetings supporting all manner of popular causes, speaking against repressive laws and practices and Chinese immigrants, all while utilising a charismatic American intonation he had attained during his time in the States.

After becoming the de facto editor of the Sydney Morning Herald, Lane left the newspaper during November 1887 to found the radical weekly, The Boomerang, a newspaper described as "a live newspaper, racy, of the soil", in which pro-worker themes and lurid racism were brought to a fever-pitch by both Sketcher and Lucinda Sharpe. He became a powerful supporter of Emma Miller and women's suffrage. A strong proponent of Henry George's Single Tax Movement, Lane became increasingly committed to a radically alternative society, and ended his relationship with the Boomerang due to its private ownership.

In May 1890 he began the trade union funded Brisbane weekly The Worker, the rhetoric of which became increasingly threatening towards the employers, the government, and the British Empire itself. The defeat of the 1891 Australian shearers' strike convinced Lane that there would be no real social change without a completely new society, and The Worker became increasingly devoted to his New Australia utopian idea which would later be made a reality.

=== White or Yellow? ===
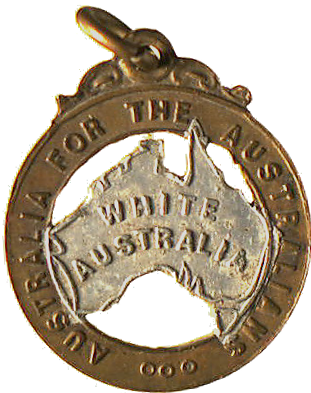
In 1910, fear of the Yellow Peril prompted the nativist Australian Natives' Association to create the White Australia badge, with which the wearer could identify his or her racial loyalty

The Workingman's Paradise, an allegorical novel written in sympathy with those involved in the 1891 shearers' strike, was published by Lane under his pseudonym John Miller in early 1892. In it, he articulated the belief that anarchism is the noblest social philosophy. Through the novel's protagonist he relates his view that society may have to experience a period of state socialism to achieve the ideal of anarcho-communism. Mary Gilmore wrote in one of her letters that "the whole book is true and of historical value as Lane transcribed our conversations as well as those of others".

Most prominent in his bibliography is his novella White or Yellow?: A Story of the Race War of A.D. 1908 (1887). In this work, Lane proposed a horde of Chinese people would legally arrive to Australia, who would then overrun White society and monopolise the industries important to exploiting the natural resources of the "empty north" of the continent. As Australian invasion literature, White or Yellow? reflects Lane's nationalist racialism and left-wing politics within a future history of Australia under attack by the Yellow Peril.

The Yellow Peril proscriptions of the White Australia policies excluded the brown-skinned peoples of Melanesia from immigration to Australia.

Lane wrote that in the near future, British capitalists would manipulate the legal system and successfully arrange the mass immigration of Chinese workers to Australia, regardless of its socioeconomic consequences to Australian common folk and their society. The economic, cultural, and sexual conflicts that resulted from the capitalists' manipulation of the Australian economy would then provoke a race war throughout the continent, fought between the White settlers and Chinese workers.

The racialist representations of Yellow Peril ideology in the narrative of White or Yellow? work to justify forcible expulsion and murder of Chinese workers as an acceptable response to the loss of physical and economic control of Australia. Historically the leaders of the Australian labour and trade unions greatly opposed the importation of Chinese workers, whom they portrayed as an economic threat to Australia due to their eagerness to work for low wages, as well as them presenting a libertine and race-diluting threat to Christian civilisation. Lane's work was intended to act as an apolitical call to racial unity among white Australians.

== New Australia Colony ==
Contriving a division among Australian labour activists between the permanently disaffected and those who later formed the Australian Labor Party, Lane refused the Queensland Government's offer of a grant of land on which to create a utopian settlement, and began an Australia-wide campaign for the creation of a new society elsewhere on the globe, peopled by rugged and sober Australian bushmen and their proud wives.

Eventually Paraguay was decided upon, and Lane and his family, including his brother John, together with hundreds of acolytes (238 total) from New South Wales, Queensland and South Australia, made their way to South America. The first group of pioneers departed Sydney in the ship Royal Tar on 1 July 1893. A second group sailed from Adelaide on the last day of 1893. Both voyages were bound for Montevideo, Uruguay, followed by an arduous overland trek to Paraguay.

New Australia soon had its crisis, brought on by the issues of interracial relationships (Lane singled out the Guarani as racially taboo) and alcohol. Lane's dictatorial manner soon alienated many in the community, and by the time the second boatload of utopians arrived from Adelaide in 1894, Lane had left with a core of devotees to form a new colony nearby named Cosme.

Eventually, amidst an array of criticism and objections to Lane's leadership, a strong internal dispute appeared between the two main groups that conformed the colony (one approving of Lane's politics and overarching decisions, and one very critical of them). Lane became disillusioned with the whole process, willingly abandoned Colonia Cosme, and returned to Australia in 1899.

A number of important people were born and raised in New Australia's settlements, including world famous comic book writer Robin Wood; Anne Whitehead's 1997 book on New Australia, Paradise Mislaid, provides a chapter on Robin Wood's childhood with his extended Australian-Paraguayan family. To this day, there are as many as 2,000 Australian Paraguayans in Paraguay.

== Later life ==
Lane left Cosme with his family on 1 August 1899, and returned to Australia where he worked briefly as editor of the Sydney Worker before sailing to New Zealand. After initial melancholia, he soon refound his old verve as a feature writer from 1900 for the New Zealand Herald, writing under the pseudonym 'Tohunga' (the Maori word for prophet), only this time as ultra-conservative and pro-Empire. He had retained the strong racial antipathy toward East Asians he expressed in his literature, and during World War I he developed extreme anti-German sentiments.

Lane died on 26 August 1917 in Auckland, New Zealand, aged 56, from bronchitis and a heart condition, having been editor of the Herald from 1913 to 1917, and becoming a much admired personality in the country. He is buried in Purewa Cemetery, Auckland. He left a wife, a son and five daughters. Before his own death, Lane had lost one son, Charles, at a cricket match in Colonia Cosme (Paraguay), and another, Donald, on the first day of the ANZAC landings (25 April 1915) at the beaches of Gallipoli.

== Legacy ==
Lane is depicted in the Douglas Stewart poem Terra Australis.

== Bibliography ==
- White or Yellow?: A Story of the Race War of A.D. 1908 (1887)
- The Workingman's Paradise: an Australian Labour Novel. Sydney, Brisbane, and London, Edwards, Dunlop and Co. (1892)
- Selections from the writings of 'Tohunga'. Auckland : Wilson & Horton, 1917
