= John Edgar Byrne =

Australian journalist

John Edgar Byrne (1843–1906), also known as Bobby Byrne, was a Queensland bushman and Gulf country pioneer turned journalist and newspaper proprietor. He was founder and owner-editor of the Queensland Figaro, later known as the Queensland Figaro and Punch.

'Bobby' Byrne was born in Pennyfields, Poplar, East London, in April 1843, and was of Scottish descent. He had two brothers, Julius Byrne, a stockbroker of Gracechurch Street, London, and Dr Theodore E. D. Byrne, better known as the "Jumping Doctor of Gympie". The latter was originally a surgeon apprenticed to a parish doctor at Islington, but he later signed up as a surgeon superintendent in charge of the immigrant ship 'The Light Brigade', subsequently visiting Brisbane in 1863 and settling in Queensland in 1866.

'Bobby' Byrne arrived in Sydney as an immigrant aboard the 'Merrie England' on 31 May 1863. He is reported at Rockhampton as early as 1864, where he joined the literary staff of A. L. Bourcicault's Northern Argus; by August 1865 he was advertising himself as an accountant and commission agent at Port Denison (Bowen) under the name Edgar J. Byrne. He earned his spurs and a solid reputation as an Australian 'bushman' during the famed 1860s Gulf country rush. He subsequently worked for several years as an occasional free-lance journalist on Queensland's north-western frontier before marriage, urban family life and a full-time position in journalism finally caught up with him. He settled initially in Maryborough in 1871 but was persuaded to move south to Brisbane with his family in late 1878.

Byrne revealed in an obituary in the Figaro in October 1887 that had served on Carl Feilberg's staff on the short-lived Brisbane Daily News in late 1878, adding that he had a friendship with Feilberg dating back to Maryborough in 1871. 'Carl was a mate of mine of some 16 years' standing', he wrote. For that reason alone, it is perhaps not surprising that Byrne and the Figaro in March and April 1883 became the first Queensland journal to take up the mantle from Feilberg and briefly campaign for a change to Queensland's policy towards or Aboriginal people at the frontier. Byrne directed considerable criticism at the new chief editorship of Charles Hardie Buzacott on The Brisbane Courier and its weekly The Queenslander. Buzacott, he claimed, had introduced a censorship on all matters related to the native police, cruelty and violation of the rights of Aboriginal people on the Queensland frontier.

Still editor and manager of the Figaro, Byrne died at St Helen's Hospital, Brisbane, on 16 November 1906, a victim of acute neuralgia. He was buried the following day at Toowong Cemetery (portion 5, section 49, grave 15).

== Affiliation ==
Byrne was on the committee of Brisbane's Johnsonian Club in the second year after its formation, and C Hardie Buzacott was the president that year.

== Sources ==
- Loader, Beatty Edward: Life of Bobby Byrne from 1924, Manuscript of sixteen handwritten pages introducing the life of John Edgar Byrne (1842–1906), editor and proprietor of the Queensland Figaro & Punch, on which Loader had himself worked as a co-editor from 1899 to 1906 at Fryer Library, (University of Queensland):
- Browne, Reginald Spencer: A Journalist's Memories, Brisbane 1927, pp. 77, 160, 178 & 186.
- Atkinson, Linda: Doctors of Gympie from 1867 - Dr Theodore Edgar Dickson Byrne, First Doctor in Gympie, 1867–1872 and 1874, Gympie Regional Libraries, n.d. (ca. 2016), pp. 20–24.
- Palmer, Edward: Early Days in North Queensland, London 1902.
- Ørsted-Jensen: Robert: The Right To Live – The Politics of Race and the Troubled Conscience of an Australian Journalist, Chapter ten 'The Figaro and a Struggle Against Silence' (yet unpublished manuscript)
