= Carl Feilberg =

Danish-Australian journalist and Indigenous rights advocate (1844–1887)

Carl Adolph Feilberg
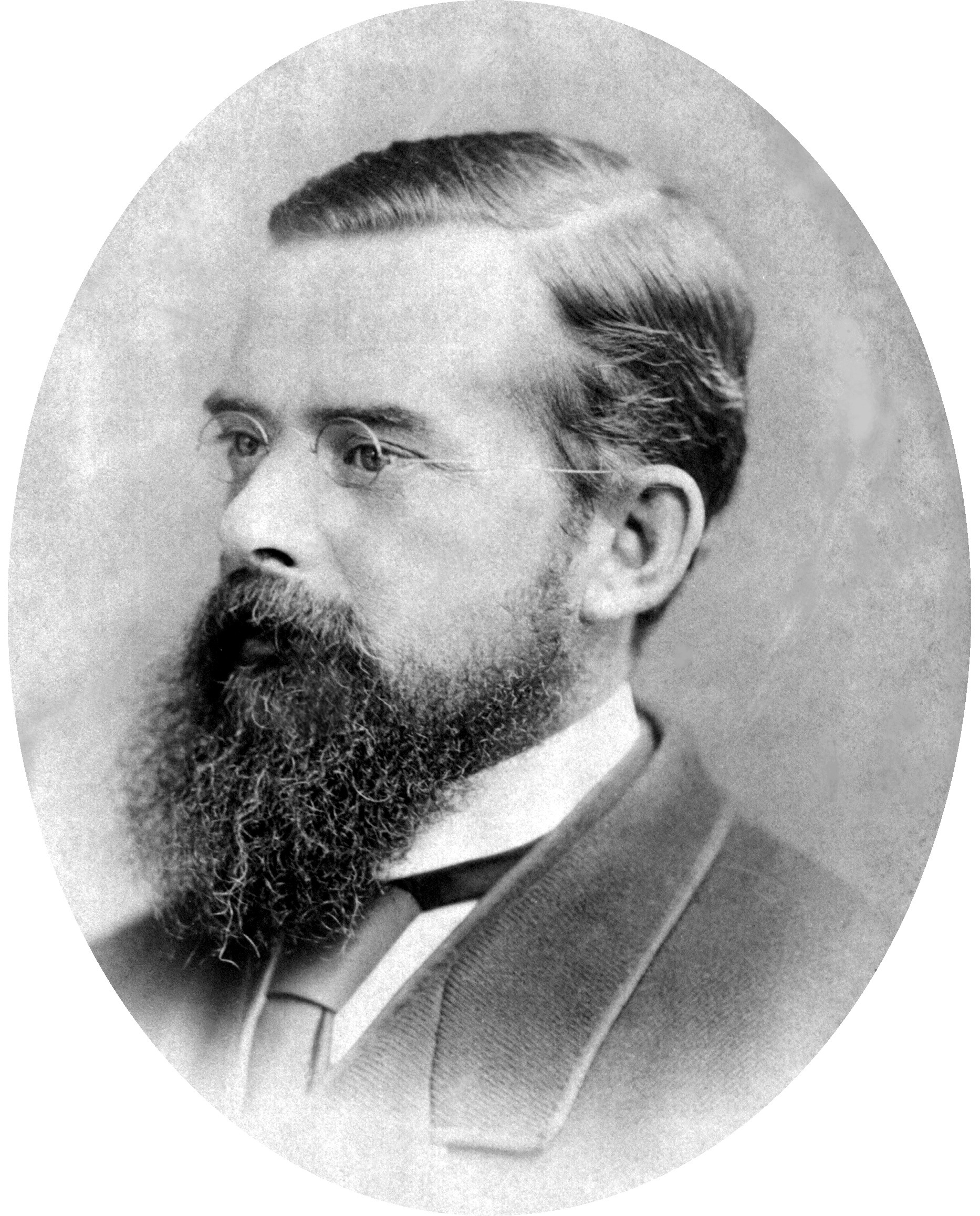
- Carl Feilberg (c. 1884
- Born: 21 August 1844; Copenhagen, Denmark
- Died: 25 October 1887 (aged 43); South Brisbane, Queensland, Australia
- Resting place: Toowong Cemetery, Brisbane
- Other names: Old Harry; Carolus, C.F.; Carl Adolf Feilberg
- Occupations: Journalist; newspaper proprietor; newspaper editor; political commentator
- Years active: 1870–1887
- Employer: Brisbane Newspaper Company
- Known for: Indigenous Australian human rights activism
- Spouse: Clara Smith (married 1872)
- Children: 5

Signature
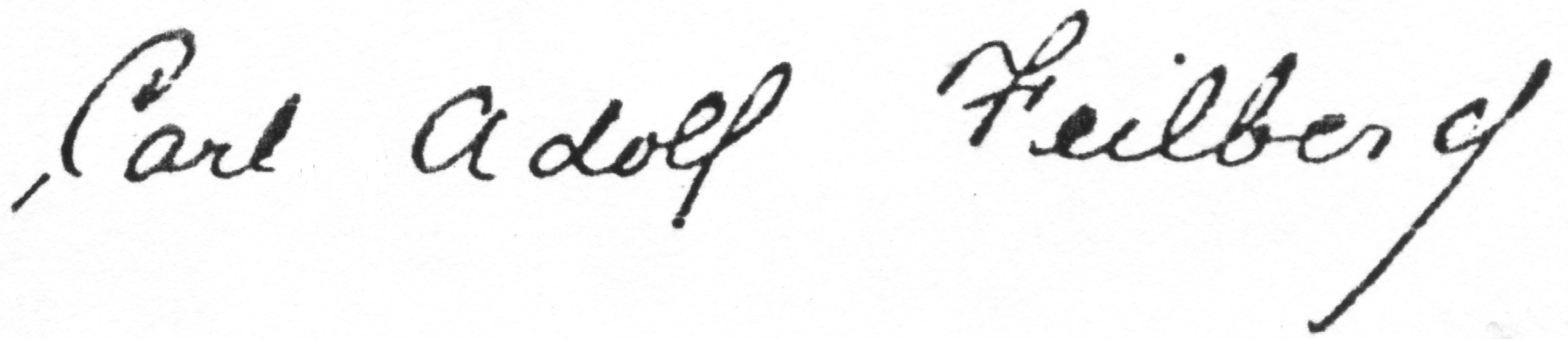

Carl Adolph Feilberg (21 August 1844 – 25 October 1887), also spelt Carl Adolf Feilberg, was a Danish-born Australian journalist, newspaper editor, general political commentator, and Indigenous rights activist.

He lived and worked mainly in the colony of Queensland, and in his editorials and columns criticised many aspects of the colonial government policy towards Aboriginal Australians in the colony, in particular the use of the Native Police. After a major campaign in The Queenslander in 1880 and the publication of a pamphlet titled The Way We Civilise: Black and White: The Native Police, he suffered personal and political fallout, and had to move to Melbourne for some time. After becoming ill there and moving back to Brisbane, he died at the age of 43.

Although widely cited, his work was not lauded for most of a century after his death, but towards the 21st century, his reputation as a journalist and historian has been recognised.

He also wrote short stories, novellas, and a novel.

== Early life and education ==
Carl Adolph Feilberg was born on 21 August 1844 in a small apartment at 1 Bredgade in Copenhagen, Denmark. He was the first born and only son of Danish Royal Navy lieutenant Christen Schifter Feilberg (1808-1853) and Louise Adelaide Feilberg (nee Lindberg) (1809-1859), the daughter of a planter on the island of St. Croix in the then Danish West Indies.

Following the early death of his mother and later his father, Carl Feilberg was initially placed in foster care with his mothers younger sister Wilhelmine Caroline Buchanan (nee Lindberg) (1811-1891), and her husband merchant James Buchanan (1805-1878), at the time living in Scotland. The formal financial guardian for the 6-year old Feilberg and his two younger siblings was his fathers brother, a well to do Manufacturer Carl Adolph Feilberg (1810-1896), the proprietor of Falconergaarden in the inner Copenhagen suburb of Frederiksberg.

Carl Feilberg received his formal education in at a bordingschool in mid Enland, followed by a year at a college of Saint-Omer in France. After graduation he moved to London, England, and was then employed by shipping broker Lloyd's of London.

Feilberg's second name was spelled Adolph in his birth record and on most contemporary publications for public use, but he frequently used "Adolf" as his personal signature. (Note: See signature on this page and compare with his printed records. (Ph and f, v and w, ch and k, etc. were regarded as synonymous in many Germanic languages in this period, and people were generally not very particular about the spelling of names in the period prior to the 1890s.)

== Move to Australia (1867) ==
Suffering from a serious case of tuberculosis, Feilberg was advised to migrate to Australia where time spent in the dry interior might mitigate some of the symptoms and provide a chance for survival.

He arrived in Sydney from London on the Aberdeen vessel Sir John Lawrence on 18 June 1867, travelling onto Rockhampton carrying a letter of introduction to Archibald Berdmore Buchanan, a Scottish squatter. He then gained "colonial experience", working as a shepherd, store and bookkeeper, predominantly at Buchanan's properties. The first six months at Cardbeign station in Springsure district, the remaining time in the Barcoo district on Greendale and possibly other stations in the central west.

The knowledge he gained in the outback, including his experiences with the Native Police and the darker sides of the colony's frontier policies, would later influence his work as a journalist, political commentator, and author.

== Journalism career ==
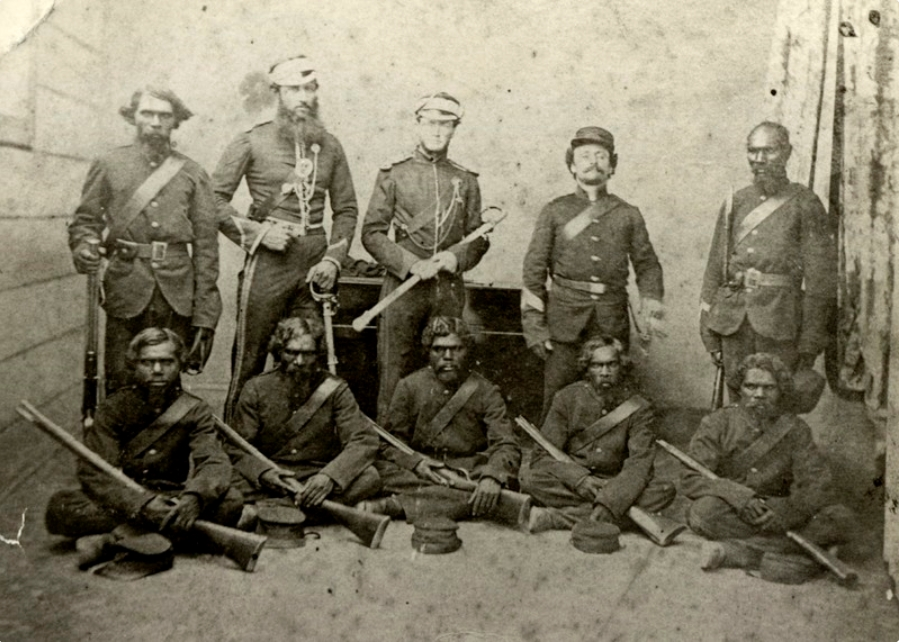
Queensland Native Police (1864)

After being naturalised at Rockhampton Court House on 21 June 1870, Feilberg chose to settle in Maryborough, where in August 1870 he commenced a career in journalism, initially assisting Ebenezer Thorne on his newly launched three-weekly Wide Bay and Burnett News. In November 1870, after a series of libel cases and family issues, Thorne sold his share in the journal to Feilberg, who became the sole editor and proprietor. Feilberg as editor supported the struggle for manhood suffrage, his success in breaking the press monopoly of William Henry Walsh. He was owner-editor of the Wide Bay and Burnett News from November 1870 to about 1875.

Feilberg's journalism covered a wide range of subjects, in which parliamentary business, railway and settlement policy, finance and economic policy, and Indigenous rights took a prominent position. Beyond being additionally a harsh critic of the Kanaka (blackbirding) trade, he was an eager advocate for settlements in the interior and railway schemes supporting this; he questioned the uncontrolled Chinese immigration (during the great mining rush in the far north); and he was a strong advocate of laws to combat the threat to the environment of uncontrolled logging and deforestation, and securing a policy of sustainable foresting.

He was freelance correspondent and occasional editorial writer for the Brisbane Courier its weekly, The Queenslander, as well as for other journals, and also editor of the Cooktown Courier from September 1876 to June 1877. He was a Hansard shorthand writer from July to October 1877, and part-proprietor and editor of the Queensland Patriot / Daily News from March 1878 to early January 1879. (Note: The Queensland Patriot was published weekly on Saturdays from 7 October 1876 (v. 1, no. 1) until 30 September 1878 (v. 4, no. 267, when it was renamed the Daily News, which was published from 1 October 1878 (v. 5, no. 268) until 18 January 1879 (v. 5, no. 358).)

After leaving Maryborough, he was employed by the Brisbane Courier as a political commentator, leader writer, and as editor of The Queenslander, from January 1879 to December 1880. In the nine months from during March to December 1880 Feilberg utilised The Queenslander as a platform to launch a series of powerfully-worded editorials and articles demanding a Royal Commission and a change of policy with regard to Indigenous Australians. Although unsuccessful, he managed to trigger two large parliamentary debates, as well as the biggest public debate of its kind ever conducted by an Australian newspaper, on this subject.

A change in the proprietorship of the Brisbane Newspaper Company in late December 1880 caused Feilberg to endure a year of being gradually relegated to steadily more subordinate positions on the journal. On 23 September 1882, in a private letter in reply to Sir Arthur Gordon, the former Governor and High Commissioner of the Western Pacific, Feilberg wrote: "I despair of doing much good for the blacks, and I have incurred enough personal ill-will myself by writing on their behalf during my residence in Queensland".

The personal and political fallout following the campaign of The Queenslander in 1880 subsequently caused Feilberg to accept a position as sub-editor on the then leading Victorian journal The Argus, based in Melbourne, in June 1882. It was noted in the contemporary press that Feilberg "has had very definite political opinions, and, in labouring unremittingly to impress them upon the public mind, has suffered at various times from the misrepresentation and obloquy which every active politician is fated to encounter".

He was sub-editor on The Argus from June 1882 to June 1883, and then returned to Brisbane to became editor-in-chief of the Brisbane Courier and The Queenslander from September 1883 to October 1887.

== Human and Indigenous rights ==
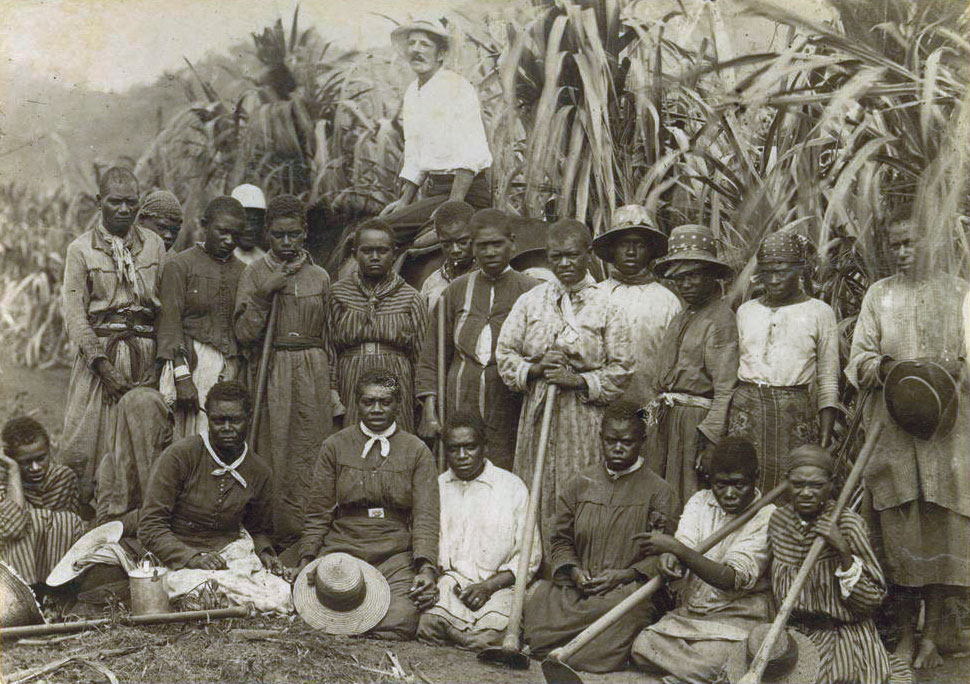
Kanaka workers in a sugar cane plantation in Queensland, late 19th century

Feilberg authored a great number of articles on the issue of human rights abuses towards Pacific Islanders and Indigenous people in Queensland. The issue of the so-called Kanaka trade or blackbirding – the use of Melanesian labour on Queensland sugar plantations – was high on his agenda from the late 1870 onwards; he and his journal were instrumental in bringing about the conviction of the captain of the recruiting schooner Jason in 1871.

Feilberg's contribution to the history of colonial Queensland, included editorials written for the Brisbane Courier from 1874 to 1878, and later in the Cooktown Courier during January to March 1877.

Feilberg ran two campaigns for the rights of Aboriginal Australians, critical of the Queensland Government's policies. The first was in 1878, when he was editor of the Queensland Patriot. This angered John Douglas, then Premier of Queensland, as well as other co-proprietors of the paper, although the Patriot was an independent liberal journal. The move was daring but ultimately unsuccessful, although it triggered a parliamentary debate on 10 July 1878.

The blueprint for the Queensland Patriot campaign was reused, commissioned by the managing editor of the Brisbane Newspaper Company, Gresley Lukin, on a much larger scale in the Brisbane Courier (the leading Queensland journal; now The Courier-Mail) two years later. In the nine months from during March to December 1880 Feilberg utilised its weekly, The Queenslander, as a platform to launch a series of powerfully-worded editorials and articles demanding a Royal Commission and a change of policy. Despite being unsuccessful, his campaign triggered two large parliamentary debates and the biggest public debate of its kind ever conducted by an Australian newspaper on this subject.

Feilberg outlined some of his deeper feelings in an editorial printed in the Queenslander on 19 January 1878, saying amongst other things that the "...complacent blindness which induces the natives of Europe to regard their own customs and institutions as excellent above compare, and their adoption as a certain remedy and advantageous substitute for all other manners of living, even to the most simple and Arcadian, has served as excuse for enormities at the contemplation of which humanity revolts...".

His opening lines to the campaign of the Queenslander on 1 May 1880, in his best known and most frequently cited editorial headed The Way We Civilise, it famously outlined Queensland's policy towards Aboriginal people in the following manner:

This, in plain language, is how we deal with the aborigines: On occupying new territory the aboriginal inhabitants are treated exactly in the same way as the wild beasts or birds the settlers may find there. Their lives and their property, the nets, canoes, and weapons which represent as much labour to them as the stock and buildings of the white settler, are held by the Europeans as being at their absolute disposal. Their goods are taken, their children forcibly stolen, their women carried away, entirely at the caprice of the white men. The least show of resistance is answered by a rifle bullet; in fact, the first introduction between blacks and whites is often marked by the unprovoked murder of some of the former – in order to make a commencement of the work of "civilising" them.

His pamphlet The Way We Civilise: Black and White: The Native Police (published in Brisbane, December 1880), which was characterised by historian Henry Reynolds as "one of the most influential political tracts in Australian history", was a collection of articles and letters formerly published in The Queenslander.

== Other activities ==
Feilberg also wrote many short stories and sketches reflecting the life and dreams of many of his fellow colonists.

He served several terms as president for Brisbane's famed literary Johnsonian Club. Other chairmen over time were noted Queenslanders such as jurist Sir Samuel Griffith, politician John Douglas, poet James Brunton Stephens, and journalist William Senior the principal shorthand writer also known as "Red Spinner". The latter three in particular were known to be close friends of Feilberg.

The Liberal Premier John Douglas appointed Feilberg as government envoy for New Guinea during the New Guinea gold rush in early 1878, and New Guinea was later a frequent subject for his numerous editorials, including in The Argus, the Brisbane Courier, and The Times (London). He was of the opinion New Guinea should be made a British protectorate, as if another power colonised it, it could pose a security risk to Australia in the future.

== Later life, death and legacy ==
He "was never physically a robust man", as one obituary stated. The illness that brought him to Australia in the first place remained dormant and the move to Melbourne proved fatal for him. What started out as a cold was to revive his old ailment and he was quite ill by mid-1883.

He gave in to an offer and returned to Brisbane in July to take on the position of editor-in-chief of the Brisbane Newspaper Company (Brisbane Courier) in September same year. He remained fully active in this position until a few weeks before his death.

He died at his home "Claraville" in Cordelia Street, South Brisbane, on 25 October 1887. The immediate cause of death was reported to be "failure of the heart", but he had been suffering from spasmodic asthma and lung disease for months previously.

The announcement of Feilberg's death triggered a quite unprecedented reaction in the contemporary press. The coverage and wording of these articles by far exceeds those honouring the passing of any of his contemporary and in many cases more famous colleagues. (Note: One only need to compare with the obituaries of contemporary Qld journalists such as G. Lukin, W. O'Carroll, C. H. Buzacott or W. H. Traill. (WP:OR?)) His funeral at Brisbane's Toowong Cemetery was attended by a wide range of friends, journalists and several high-ranking politicians from both sides of Queensland politics, including the former Premier, Sir Thomas McIlwraith. A eulogy was authored by poet Francis Adams.

Feilberg was a prominent political commentator and newspaper editor in Queensland in his time, and was well-known in other Australian colonies. His death in October 1887 was received with an amount of strongly worded obituaries and expressions of grief, which was to remain extraordinary as well as unprecedented for any Queensland journalist of his era. (Note: No contemporary Queensland journalist was honoured with this level of attention, in particular not anything as strong worded as these obituaries. Indeed hardly any contemporary Premier of Queensland received this level of contemporary attention.)

His most lasting legacy became the numerous articles he wrote dealing with the most painful issue of all – Queensland's frontier Indigenous policy, Native Police system, and what he continually argued was an urgent need for the government to reform and move to protect the fundamental rights of Indigenous people.

The memory of this crucial part of Feilberg's writings, however, was to remain victim to the "veil of silence" which covered all issues related to the treatment of Indigenous people in the colonial era for the most part of a century. To the extent Feilberg's name was remembered at all, it was for his advocacy of some restrictions being put on Chinese immigration and for him being an early opponent of the Kanaka labour-trade; issues which were clearly viewed as more acceptable by early nineteenth-century Australian historians and record keepers. Yet Feilberg's commitment to human rights was hinted at in various ways by some of his obituary writers and close friends.

Feilberg is one of the most notable and frequently cited advocate of Indigenous human rights in the history of colonial Queensland. (Note: Some may argue that Archibald Meston was as significant. Yet Meston only entered this cause when it became opportunistic to do so as the last genuine frontier had evaporated and some of his key political friends underwent a rather drastic change of attitude. Prior to the 1890s he was indeed known primarily as a man who frequently spoke about Aborigines he had personally shot in punitive expedition (more about Meston in Ørsted-Jensen: Frontier History Revisited (2011), p.141, and in general 112pp). Being a 'Queenslander' (Q., by all account, carrying the single largest pre-contact population of any state and territory of Australia)and a modern thinking and secular minded person some may even argue that Feilberg, although his name was almost completely forgotten, is by far more interesting and significant in this field than the mainly Tasmania operating humanitarian George Augustus Robinson.) Almost all Indigenous policy critical articles, editorial comments and editorials printed in the Brisbane Courier and its weekly The Queenslander between 1874 and 1886 were authored by Feilberg. Additionally he conducted two lengthy campaigns, one in the Queensland Patriot in 1878 (Note: Queensland Patriot, 29 June – 23 July 1878. The campaign successfully aimed at the Police estimates which was tabled in parliament in July. The Premier (John Douglas), who was also the original instigator and co-proprietor of the Patriot, had not approved of this campaign and he clearly was furious when the issue was forced on him and the parliament. Yet this brief campaign, and the fact that he was willing to cross the very man who had employed him added to Feilberg's reputation amongst fellow journalist in particular.) and the other and most notable in The Queenslander in 1880, (Note: The Queenslander / Brisbane Courier campaign for Indigenous rights in 1880, remains the largest of its kind ever produced by a leading Australian newspaper. It lasted from March to December that year, and included a great number of more or less anonymously publicised letters from what clearly was a great number of leading frontier settlers of the day. It included a total of 9 articles, 12 editorials and a follow-up newspaper debate in which 37 settlers contributed with 48 letters.) both of them (but the latter, in particular), triggering significant public and parliamentary debates centred around the issue of the colony's Native Police Force and frontier Indigenous policy.

=== Legacy of a pamphlet ===
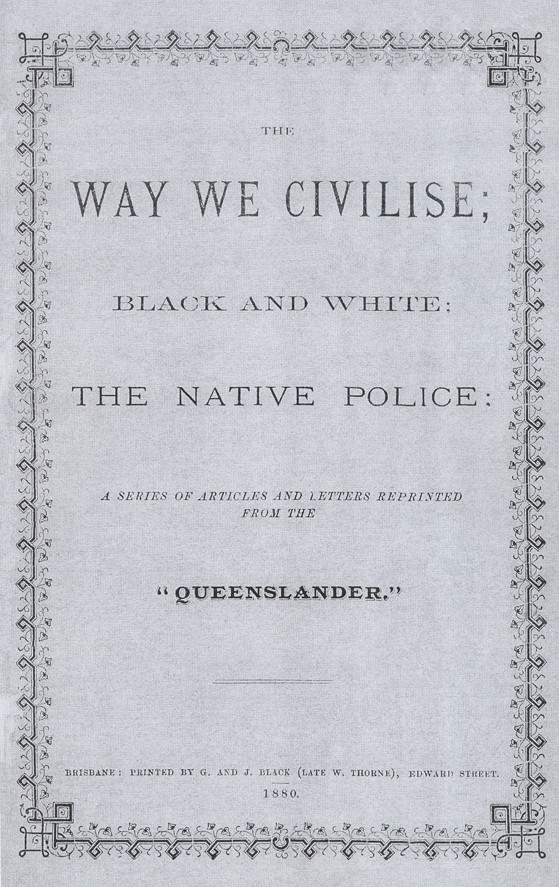
Front page of The Way We Civilise (1880)

Feilberg's 1880 pamphlet, The Way We Civilise, played a crucial behind the scene role in the British Government move to nullify Queensland's unilateral annexation of New Guinea in April 1883. It was actively used by Sir Arthur Gordon, the Aborigines Protection Society, and others, as evidence to persuade the British Prime Minister William Ewart Gladstone and his Secretary of State for the Colonies, Lord Derby, that Queensland was utterly unfit for the task of ruling New Guinea.

Feilberg's pamphlet and opponents of the views expressed in it are frequently cited in many books, articles, studies, and documentaries up to the present day. (Note: Often lengthy quotes and other references to Feilberg's work are found in books dealing generally with Queensland's colonial history, such as Ross Fitzgerald's From the Dreaming to 1915 (1982); William Ross Johnston's A Documentary History of Queensland (1988); and in a variety of studies, books, documentaries, and articles dealing generally with race relations in colonial Australia, including Henry Reynolds' The Other Side of the Frontier (1981); Sharman Stone's documentary Aborigines in White Australia (1974); and journalist Bruce Elder's Blood on the Wattle (1988). Studies dealing specifically with Queensland's race relations' history, such as Raymond Evans in Exclusion, Exploitation and Extermination (Brisbane 1975), the Reynolds-edited Race Relations in North Queensland (1978), Noel Loos' Invasion and Resistance (1982); and Pamela Lukin Watson's Frontier Lands & Pioneer Legends (1998). It was cited in Judith Wright's The Cry for the Dead (1981) and in Roslyn Poignant's Professional Savages (2004). Gordon Reid's That Unhappy Race, (Melbourne 2006), p. 115-16, 125–127, 230.) The satirical title The Way We Civilise was eventually re-used in 1997 as a title for Rosalind Kidd's study on Queensland's institutionalised policy towards Aboriginal people from the 1880s onwards. Feilberg's pamphlet is equally cited in the highly profiled Bringing Them Home (1997), which reported on the Stolen Generations (Aboriginal children forcibly removed from their families to be brought up in institutions during the twentieth century), and in Ben Kiernan's Blood and Soil: A World History of Genocide and Extermination (2008). (Note: Many of these writers believed, wrongly as it is, that the author of the articles was Gresley Lukin, the then part proprietor of the Brisbane Newspaper Co., but Lukin was 'only' the part proprietor and 'managing editor' he wrote articles only on rare occasions and the de facto editor of the Courier at the time was in fact not Lukin but William Augustine O'Carroll. All of this was partly revealed by Henry Reynolds in This Whispering in Our Hearts (see above), and it is further detailed and substantiated by Ørsted-Jensen in The Right to Live: The Politics of Race and the Troubled Conscience of an Australian Journalist chapter one The Resurgence....)

=== Personal tributes ===
William Henry Traill, journalist and Feilberg's predecessor as editor of The Queenslander, who was later the editor of The Sydney Mail, owner-editor of the famed weekly magazine The Bulletin and a NSW politician, was the only one of Feilberg's friends who dared to mention Feilberg's feelings on the question of Indigenous rights (possibly because Traill was living in Sydney at the time), saying:

As a journalist he was an untiring worker, few newspapers in Australia have not been benefited by his pen, and few writers on all subjects were more appreciated by the public, he never wrote himself out, and his style was always fresh and free from any touch of respective sameness...Poor Feilberg! There were two subjects on which one could always rouse his righteous indignation – the treatment of the blacks, and the seizure of the Danish fleet by Nelson; his love of fair play was too strongly appealed to in both.

Somewhat a political opponent, yet nonetheless a close personal friend, Walter John Morley, editor-in-chief of the Brisbane Evening Observer, (Note: The Evening Observer was published from around 1887 until 1907, and was renamed Observer and Evening Brisbane Courier (1907–1926?).) wrote about Feilberg that he was "a man whom it was impossible to regard with indifference", adding that Feilberg, "in his working days", was

... one of the most voluminous and valued of Australian writers... As a Press writer Mr. Feilberg was without a rival in the colony, and had few equals on the continent. His style was clear, crisp, and trenchant, and withal somewhat cynical; he could detect at once the weak spot of an argument, and understood thoroughly the worth of ridicule and the power of satire. His writings exhibit a perfect knowledge of the country, and of country life, and betray a sympathy with human nature for which those who saw only his other writings would never credit him... His views were naturally extreme, for he was intense, as such men always are, and this extremeness, with the vigour of his enunciation, caused him to make many and bitter enemies. Probably there were few men in the colony more bitterly hated by political and social opponents, yet there was certainly no man more beloved by those whose privilege it was to know him intimately. For underneath all his cynicism and his apparent vindictiveness beat a heart that overflowed with all that makes humanity noble and good. He never saw distress without wishing to relieve it...

Francis Adams, poet and socialist activist, wrote:

He was a soldier in the army of Letters and of light of whom his comrades can be proud. He fixed his eyes on the abiding truth of human life – on justice and on mercy, on trust and on love – and clung to them. He felt, as so many of us feel, that the old symbols see no new ones in the world of thought and feeling of his time.

"Bobby" Byrne, or John Edgar Byrne, a Londoner turned bushman and pioneer during the Gulf country rush in the 1860s, later journalist and owner-editor of the Queensland Figaro and Punch, simply stated: (Note: Note use of given name, highly unusual for this period.)

Carl was a mate of mine of some 16 years' standing. The Brisbane dailies supply full particulars of his life, and it is not for me to gush about his virtues. He was my mate, and I always found him "white." (Note: For an Australian "bushman" to call another man "white" was the greatest honour in those days, equivalent of saying that he was something like a plain, genuine and upright man of the highest personal integrity. It was used even on black people at times, one example is the black Danish West Indian, turned Australian heavy weight boxer, Peter Jackson (boxer) (1861–1901) who was called a "real whiteman".) I first met him in Maryborough, when he had just come back from the Barcoo, where he had been jackarooing. Some of the best yarns that ever appeared in Punch and Figaro I learned from Carl Feilberg...

== Recognition ==
After much of his most controversial work had conveniently forgotten about in the generations to follow, subsequent research has shown that the scale of killings of Aboriginal people in what has subsequently been dubbed the Australian frontier wars was far greater than commonly reported, with some researchers suggesting that around 60,000 lives were taken in Queensland alone. Historian Henry Reynolds in particular has played a big part in publicising Feilberg's work.

Feilberg started gaining more recognition for his work in the 21st century, and in 2018 he was inducted into the Australian Media Hall of Fame.

== Works ==
Feilberg's main strength was his work as a political commentator and leader-writer, for, among others, the Wide Bay and Burnett News (c. October 1870 to 1875), Cooktown Courier (from September 1876 to June 1877), the Queensland Patriot (from February 1878 to January 1879), The Brisbane Courier and its weekly The Queenslander (sporadically in the period 1875 – February 1878, intensively from January 1879– January 1881 & July 1883– September 1887) and Melbourne Argus (Brisbane correspondent from 1880 to 1882, sub-editor on amongst others the subject of Queensland & New Guinea from July 1882 – June 1883). He was the author behind the parliamentary column of the "Political Froth" by "the Abstainer" and the column "Specialities" in The Queenslander from January 1879 – to May 1882, and political commentaries such as "The future of North-Eastern Australia".

In his spare time Feilberg wrote fiction and several sketches, romantic short stories, and also a small adventure novel, A Strange Exploring Trip, which some contemporaries viewed as having a curious resemblance with Henry Rider Haggard's later King Solomon's Mines (from 1885). He used personal experiences in several of his stories from the outer Barcoo and early Rockhampton in the late 1860s, and from Cooktown and the Palmer gold field in the 1870s. His short stories were very popular in his own time. Some of these sketches and stories were signed "CF", but several were not signed at all, his authorship being revealed in writings by various contemporaries. These works include:

- "Some Queensland Pioneers", a series of ten articles by "CF" (30 December 1882 to 30 June 1883) in The Australasian (weekly Melbourne Argus)
- "A Strange Exploring Trip" – Chapter I-XVIII by "Old Harry", a small serialised novel in the Saturday edition of the Brisbane Courier (and The Queenslander) onwards from 15 April to 7 October 1876.
- "To The Red Barcoo" by "* * *" Queenslander Supplement, 24 February 1877, pp. 1d-4a.
- "Miami – A Tale told by the Sea" by "CF", Queenslander Christmas Supplement,' 22 December 1877, pp. 10–11.
- "Dividing Mates" by "CF" Queenslander Christmas Supplement, 14 December 1878.
- "Jeannie" by "CF" Queenslander Christmas Supplement, 20 December 1879, pp. 1–3.
- "Drift" by "CF" Queenslander Christmas Supplement, 25 December 1880, pp. 10–12.
- "Our Friend the Captain" by "CF" – a story about a charming Central Queensland bushranger Queenslander "Christmas Supplement" 19 December 1885, pp. 7–8.
- "A Curl of a Woman"s Hair" by Carl Feilberg, Illustrated Sydney News, Christmas Edition, December 1886.
- "My Mate"s Locket" by Carl A. Feilberg, about the life of a Danish migrant (fiction), the only story actually printed in book-form. It appears in Turner, Charles (illustrator): Australian Stories in Prose and Verse, Melbourne (Cameron, Laing) 1882, 105 pages, ill., an anthology of fourteen stories by (cit.) "leading Australian writers, viz Frank Morley, Henry Kendall, Marcus Clarke, N. Walter Swan, R. P. Whitworth, Donald Cameron, Carl A. Feilberg, Charles Turner, and Janet Carrol."

A few stories, in some cases half finished, were later sold from Feilberg's estate and printed after his death in the radical journal The Boomerang, they were:

- "Camp Fire Yarns", 3 December 1887.
- "Attacked by the Blacks", 17 December 1887.
- "The Evil Eye", 24 December 1887 and 7 January 1888.
- "His Colonial Experience", 4 February 1888 and 11 March 1888.

== Personal life ==
On 15 May 1872 Feilberg married Clara Smith (1851–1932) at the Presbyterian Church in Maryborough. She was the daughter of the engineer and proprietor of Kilkivan Mine, Scotsman Walter Smith (c. 1821–1903), and Clara Susannah Smith. Walter Smith was one of the early settlers in Adelaide, in the colony of South Australia, and Clara was born there in 1851. The family moved to Queensland, where Walter first built a sawmill on the Logan River. When it was burnt down, they moved to Maryborough in the 1860s.

Carl and Clara had two sons and three daughters, who survived Clara's death in 1932, and lived in Brisbane.
