= William Senior =

William Senior may refer to:

- William Senior (journalist) (1837–1920), Anglo-Australian journalist
- William Senior (politician) (1850–1926), Australian politician
- William Senior (historian) (1862–1937), English legal historian
