= The Australian Producers' Home Journal =

Former Sydney based newspaper

The Australian Producers' Home Journal is an English-language newspaper which was published in 1910 in Sydney, New South Wales, Australia. It was published by S. A. Sawell.

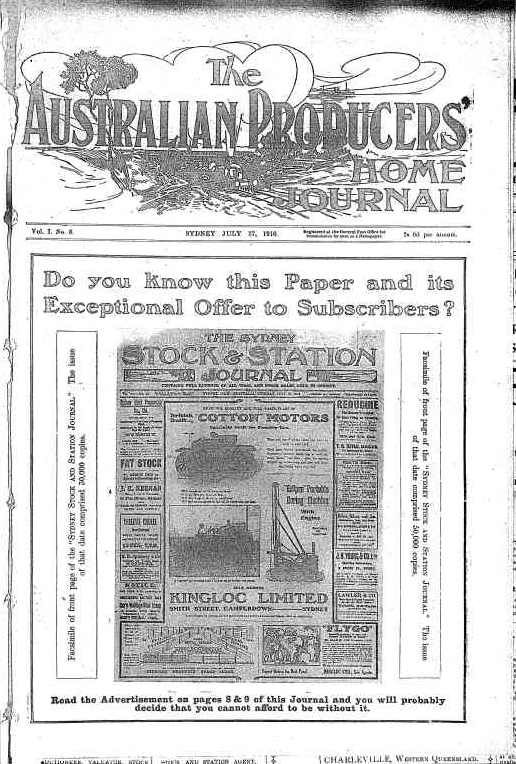
The Australian Producers' Home Journal 27 July 1910

== History ==
The Australian Producers' Home Journal was a monthly publication, usually published on the third Tuesday of each month. The paper featured articles on agricultural industries including dairy farming, fruit growing, the sheep industry as well as providing general advice about the management of farmyards and farms generally.

According to the issue of the newspaper dated 23 August 1910, "This paper is sent free to subscribers to 'The Stock and Station Journal'". The short duration of the publication appears to have been in 1910 only. The Trove entry indicates holdings:

Vol. 1, no. 5 (July 27, 1910)-vol. 1, no. 9 (November 22, 1910)

== Digitisation ==
Some editions of the paper have been digitised as part of the Australian Newspapers Digitisation Program project hosted by the National Library of Australia.

== See also ==
- List of newspapers in Australia
- List of newspapers in New South Wales
