= The Sunday Mail (Brisbane) =

Australian newspaper, founded 1923

- Front page of The Sunday Mail; 15 July 2007
- Type: Sunday Newspaper
- Format: Tabloid
- Owner: News Corp Australia
- Editor: Melanie Pilling
- Founded: 1923
- Political alignment: Right-wing
- Headquarters: Bowen Hills Queensland
- Website: www.thesundaymail.com.au

The Sunday Mail is a print newspaper published on Sunday in Brisbane, Queensland, Australia. It is Brisbane's only Sunday newspaper. It is a subsidiary newspaper of The Courier-Mail, itself an online daily tabloid operating a number of regional newspapers owned by News Corp Australia. It is available for purchase throughout Queensland, most regions of Northern New South Wales and parts of the Northern Territory. As of September 2025, if not earlier, it no longer has its own online presence, with its historical website redirecting to the website of The Courier-Mail.

== Publishing ==
Founded in 1923, beside the daily newspaper The Courier-Mail, The Sunday Mail is published by Queensland Newspapers, part of News Corp Australia, whose parent company is News Corp. The editorial office is located at Bowen Hills, in Brisbane's inner northern suburbs, and the newspaper is printed in the suburb of Murarrie.

The current editor is Melanie Pilling, whose appointment took effect on 24 June 2024.

Liz Deegan succeeded Michael Prain as editor in September 2006. Prain, who was editor of the newspaper for almost a decade, was appointed managing editor, digital media, of Queensland Newspapers. As she prepared to take over as editor, Deegan said: "I'm excited by the challenge of editing the biggest -selling newspaper in Australia's fastest growing state and ensuring its circulation keeps pace with the rapid growth of Queensland."

The December 2006 Roy Morgan Readership poll put the newspaper's circulation at 601,357, with readership at 1,515,000, making it the third most read Sunday newspaper in Australia.

The Sunday Mail was published in a new design, featuring a new masthead, updated typography and somewhat different supplements on 15 July 2007.

In June 2013, The Sunday Mail announced that Peter Gleeson would take over the role of editor from Scott Thompson.

As of 2021, The Sunday Mail costs A$3.50.

As of September 2025, if not earlier, it no longer has its own online presence, with its historical website redirecting to the website of The Courier-Mail, with the two newspaper titles noted on the "About" page. The Courier-Mail includes a subscription option for delivery of the print version of the Saturday Courier-Mail and The Sunday Mail.

== Digitisation ==
The paper has been digitised up until 26 December 1954 as part of the Australian Newspapers Digitisation Program of the National Library of Australia.

== See also ==
- List of newspapers in Australia
