= The Boomerang =

Newspaper in Brisbane, Queensland

The Boomerang was a weekly newspaper published in Brisbane, Queensland, Australia.

== History ==
The Boomerang was a short-lived radical, illustrated, weekly newspaper, published in Brisbane, Queensland, in the late 19th century.

It's subtitle, in boomerang-shaped letters, promised, like the boomerang, to be 'true to the skilful hand that flings it forth. It flies in whirling circles to its destined mark'.

The Boomerang was established by journalist, trade unionist and Utopian, William Lane in 1887, publishing its first issue on 19 November. It published stories, poetry, cartoons, social and sporting notes, reflecting a time of growing interest in radical ideas and politics.

Notable contributors included cartoonist E. H. Murray, Annie Lane (nee Macquire, wife of William Lane), writing under the pen name ‘Lucinda Sharpe’, orator and unionist Gilbert Casey, Indigenous rights activist Carl Feilberg, poet and journalist Zora Cross, who worked for the paper for three years, editor Gresley Lukin, writer and literary critic A. G. Stephens, agricultural writer, journalist and socialist, Alfred Yewen and Henry Lawson (under pen name of ‘Joe Swallow') who contributed a column entitled ‘Country Crumbs’. Leading radical feminist intellectual Leontine Cooper wrote both short-stories and essays for it. A second key Queensland based feminist Elizabeth Grace Neill, journalist and writer and later senior labour advocate, was on the staff. A.G. Stephens also worked as a sub-editor, but left in 1891 to become editor and part proprietor of the Cairns Argus. James Drake, future Attorney-General of Australia, was a shareholder, writer and joint editor.

In 1891, Lane was approached to be the editor of The Worker, a newspaper being established by the local labour unions. As a consequence, Lane sold The Boomerang to Lukin. Lukin published the newspaper until 9 April 1892 after the company was voluntarily wound up.

No connection has been found between this newspaper and the 1894 Melbourne Boomerang weekly published by Edward Findley.

== Publications ==
A eulogy by Francis Adams for Danish Australian journalist and Indigenous rights activist Carl Feilberg was published in the journal after his death in late 1887, followed by several of Feilberg's short stories.

== Access ==
A hand-written index to The Boomerang is held by the John Oxley Library, State Library of Queensland, and all issues (from No. 1 (Saturday, 19 November 1887) to No. 230 (Saturday, 9 April 1892)) are held in the Library, both on paper and microfilm. The microform version is available for use at some other libraries.
