= Queenslander =

Queenslander may refer to:

- Queenslander, a person from the Australian state of Queensland
- Queenslander, the name of a train service operated by Queensland Rail
- Queenslander (architecture), a style of architecture found in Queensland
- The Queenslander, a newspaper published from 1866 to 1939
