= Daily Mail (Brisbane) =

Australian newspaper (1903–1933)

The Daily Mail was a newspaper published in Brisbane, Queensland, Australia from 1903 to 1933.

== History ==
The newspaper was founded by Charles Hardie Buzacott. Its first issue appeared on 3 October 1903. From June to December 1915 it was titled the Brisbane Daily Mail.

It was last published on 26 August 1933, after which it merged with the Brisbane Courier by Keith Murdoch and became The Courier-Mail, which is still Brisbane's main daily newspaper.

== Digitisation ==
The digitisation of the newspaper has commenced as part of the Australian Newspapers Digitisation Program of the National Library of Australia. As April 2019, part of 1903 and the years 1916 to 1926 have been digitised.
