= William Augustine O'Carroll =

Irish nationalist, radical liberal, journalist and newspaper editor

William Augustine O'Carroll (1831–1885) was an Irish nationalist, radical liberal, journalist and Queensland newspaper editor.

== Background ==
O'Carroll was the son of a ship's captain and born in a family bakery In Patrick Street, Cork, Ireland. He joined the Fenians in 1858 and was a contributor to the Nationalist journal Irish People for which he subsequently became the editor. He left Ireland, allegedly with 'a prize on his head' following the failure of the 'St Patrick Plot' and he subsequently migrated to Brisbane with his family by the Chatsworth in 1862. O'Carroll gained a reputation in Queensland as the author of a series of articles to the Queensland Guardian newspaper, critical of the Irish immigration as conducted by the agents of its primary promoter, the Catholic Bishop of Queensland James O'Quinn. He joined the Guardian staff and from that time onwards O'Carroll's history was bound up with that of journalism in Queensland.

He joined the staff of the Brisbane Courier following the collapse of the Guardian but a struggle for the political line amongst that journals shareholders subsequently caused him to form the small liberal-oriented journal the Colonist in conjunction with Robert Travers Atkin (1841–1872). This effort was severely halted by the premature death of Atkin in 1872, yet O'Carroll carried on this effort for some time as a tri-weekly under the name The Express, yet he eventually sold to the company who bought up to launch what became the Brisbane Telegraph newspaper. He then joined the staff of the new part-owner of the Brisbane Courier, Gresley Lukin in November 1873 and remained in the position of 'sub-editor' on that journal throughout Lukin's managing proprietorship which lasted to 21 December 1880. Yet although Lukin retained the position as editor, and to some extent discharged the duty of that office, O'Carroll was from the beginning entrusted with a large share of the editorial responsibility. It was stated at his death that O'Carroll had been the 'de facto editor' of the Brisbane Courier onwards from the mid-1870s and remained in that position right through to September 1883, when the new managing proprietor Charles Hardie Buzacott appointed Carl Adolf Feilberg as editor-in-chief of the Brisbane Courier and its weekly the Queenslander.

O'Carroll was buried in the Roman Catholic section of Toowong Cemetery which was attended by approximately 500 people.
