= The Sydney Stock and Station Journal =

Newspaper in Sydney, New South Wales,1888 to 1924

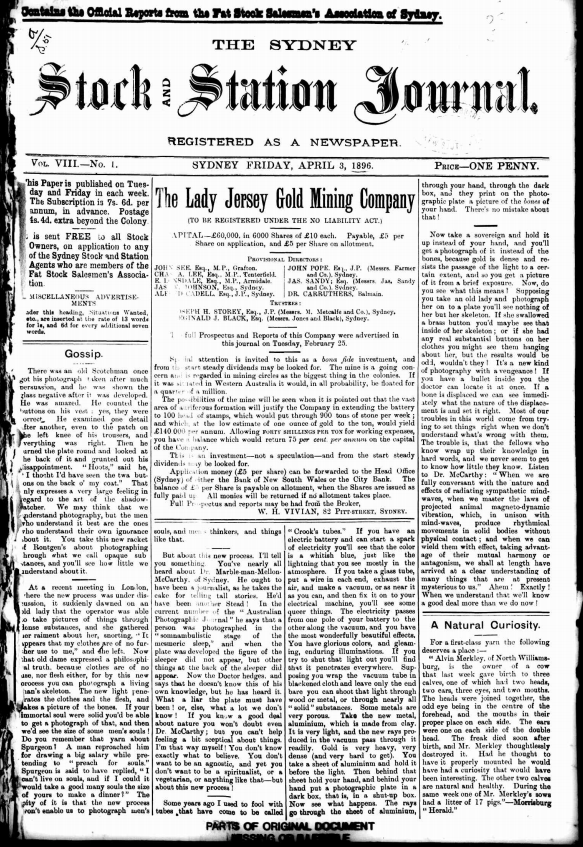
Front cover of The Sydney Stock and Station Journal on 3 April 1896

The Sydney Stock and Station Journal was a newspaper published in Sydney, New South Wales, Australia from 1888 to 1924. It was then published as Country Life and Stock and Station Journal from 1924 to 1978.

== History ==
The Sydney Stock and Station Journal was first published in 1888 by Robert MacMillan and the Stock Journal Newspaper Company Ltd. The paper was also the journal of the Fat Stock Salesman's Association of New South Wales. McMillan wrote under the name 'Gossip' and died in February 1929, aged 81. In 1924 it was renamed as Country Life and Stock and Station Journal and was published under this title until 1978. The paper was split into two editions National Country Life and National Country Life: Livestock Farming Edition until the publication ceased in May 1982.

The newspaper served the rural areas of New South Wales, and promoted the arts including the works of Scottish-Australian poet and bush balladeer Will H. Ogilvie (1869–1963) and Adam Lindsay Gordon.

== Notable staff ==
- Alfred Gregory Yewen, subeditor – agricultural writer, journalist and socialist

== Digitisation ==
This paper has been digitised as part of the Australian Newspapers Digitisation Program project of the National Library of Australia.

== See also ==
- List of newspapers in Australia
- List of newspapers in New South Wales
- The Sydney Wool and Stock Journal
