= Joseph Augustine Clarke =

Australian artist

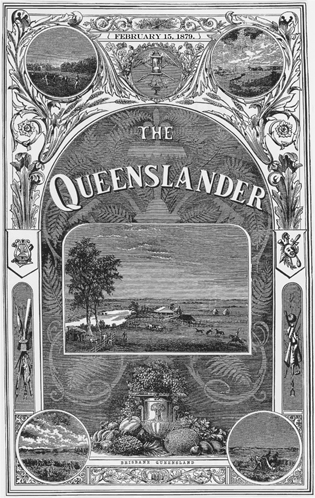
- J.A.Clark, the front and title page of the 'Queenslander' of 15 February 1879
- Born: August 21, 1844; England
- Died: September 21, 1890 (aged 46); Brisbane, Queensland
- Occupations: artist (painter, drawer and illustrator)
- Years active: 1870–1890
- Employer(s): Brisbane Newspaper Co Queensland Figaro, Brisbane School of Arts & Brisbane Girl's Grammar School

Joseph Augustine Clarke (1844–1890) early Queensland artist, painter, journal illustrator and arts-teacher.

'J.A. Clark', as he commonly signed himself, was responsible for the famous 1880 oil painting 'Panorama of Brisbane from Bowen Terrace' and also for all of the famous front pages and title-illustration used in the Queenslander (see illustration on this page) during Lukin's managing editorship of that Journal from 1873 to 1880.

Little is known about Clark, except that he was born in England as son of John Clark and Mary Shell and that he came to Brisbane from India about 1870. He was trained at the Department of Science and Art, South Kensington, and had taught at the Bombay School of Design before coming to the colony of Queensland. In Queensland he became a leading artist, art critic and art teacher, a member of the Board of General Education (the predecessor of the Department of Public Instruction) and, in 1872, the North Brisbane School of Arts.

It is said that his original migration from England was caused by a 'weak chest' (likely TB). He was certainly a treasured teacher on Brisbane School of Arts, later a 'Drawing Master' at Brisbane Girls Grammar School, next to his work as a painter and as an illustrator (most notably for The Queenslander, and for 'Bobby' Byrne's weekly the Queensland Figaro).

== Affiliation ==
Clarke was a founding member of Brisbane's Johnsonian Club. Another founding member was Horace Earle who had also taught in India, in the early 1850s.
