= Nehemiah Bartley =

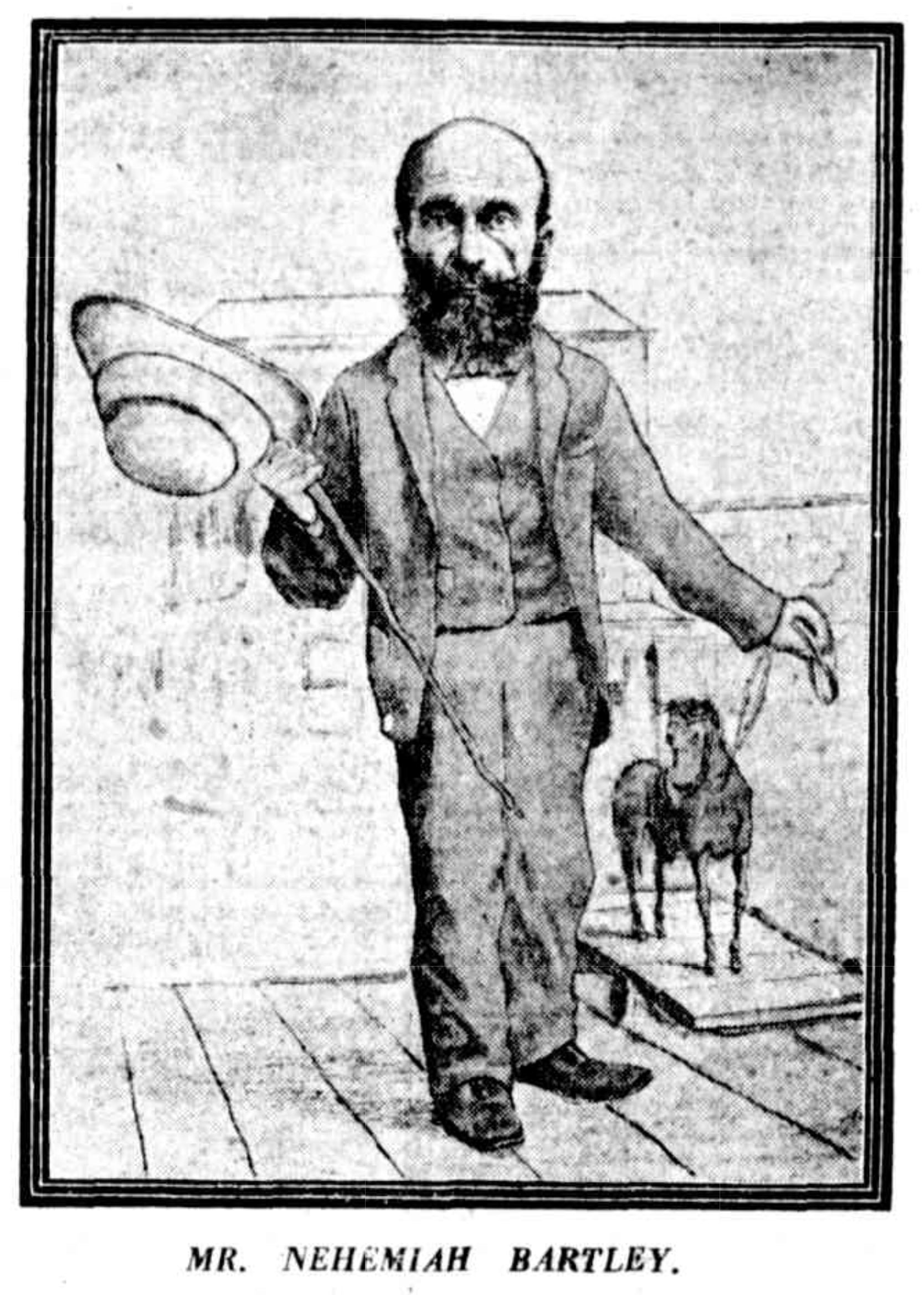
Sketch of Nehemiah Bartley, 1924

Nemehiah Bartley (10 May 1830 – 10 July 1894) was an Australian merchant primarily active in the Colony of Queensland. He arrived in Australia from England at the age of 19, and also lived for periods in Tasmania, Victoria, and New South Wales. His diaries and published books of his reminiscences provide detailed observations on colonial life in Australia and its personalities.

== Early life ==
Bartley was born in New Cross, London on 10 May 1830. He was orphaned as a young boy and brought up by his aunt. He attended the City of London School.

== Tasmania ==
In 1849 he left England for Tasmania, sailing in the ship Calcutta for Hobart. At that time there were discoveries of gold in California, and soon after his arrival in Tasmania he made a trading voyage to San Francisco, touching at Tahiti, Caroline Island, and Honolulu en route, and entering the Golden Horn in May 1850. Returning to Launceston he had a glimpse of Norfolk Island, where the worst of Tasmanian convicts were confined.

== New South Wales ==
In 1851 Bartley went to Victoria with the intention of gaining experience on a sheep station west of Geelong. Circumstances cut his stay in Victoria short, and he was soon back in Launceston, only, however, to quickly travel to Sydney. Experiences on the Turon goldfield, where he ran a store and bakery, were followed by a period during which he was a teller in the Bank of New South Wales in Sydney. Then he went travelling with sheep, and he was at Paika and Canally in November 1853, when the first navigation of the Murray River took place. He visited Melbourne in December of that year but had returned by Christmas 1853 to Sydney.

== Queensland ==
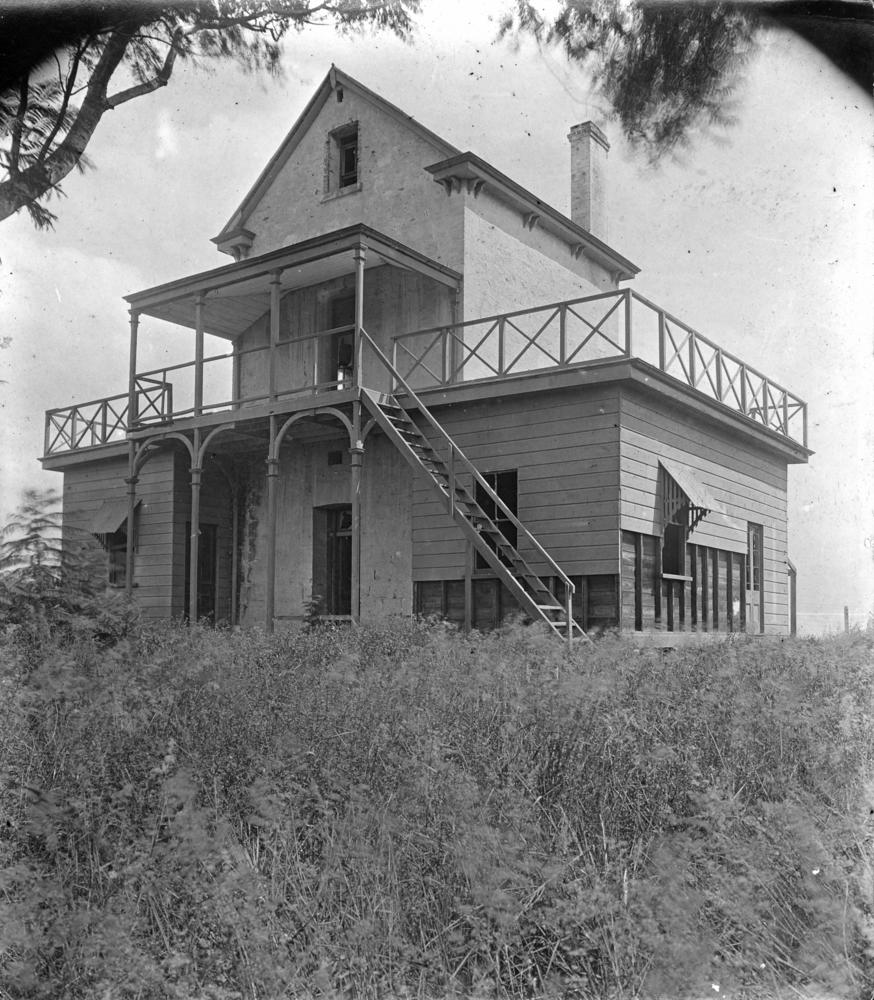
Bartley's Folly in Hamilton, circa 1914

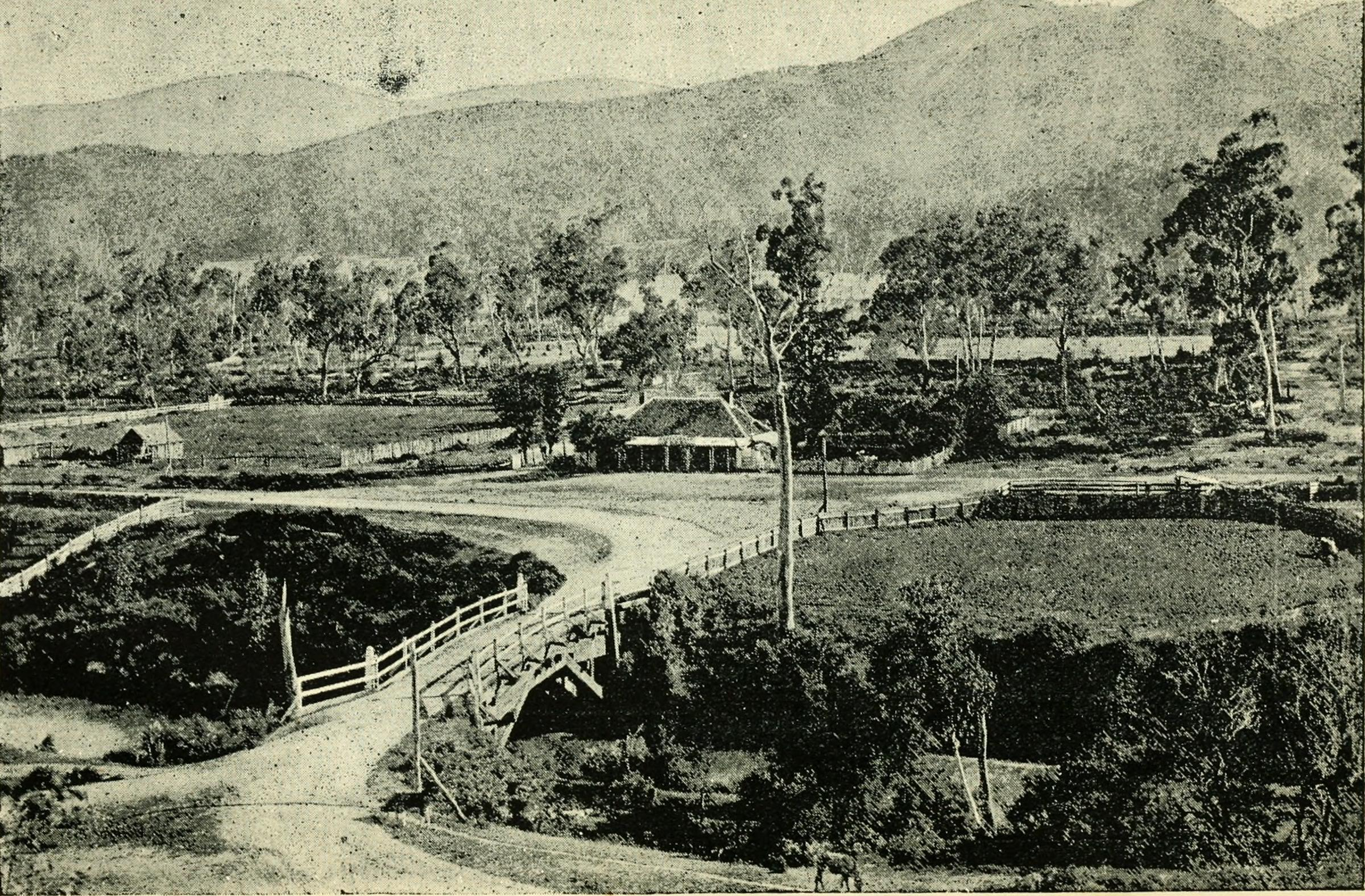
One of the illustrations in "Opals and agates", published 1892

In 1854, Bartley was attracted to "the outdoor life of a commercial traveller and agent in the new land of Moreton Bay [as Queensland was then known], doing the rounds of the Darling Downs and Burnett districts overy six weeks or so." In February 1854 on the steamer City of Melbourne, he arrived in Brisbane, which was described as the "prettiest country town in New South Wales" (this was prior to the Separation of Queensland in 1859) . From that time onward, he resided in Queensland, and led an active life in various occupations, seeing a good deal of the country, and gathering together a wealth of information on its pioneers, its characteristics, and its resources, particularly its mineral wealth. His writings told of his knowledge and of his varied experiences. On 5 January 1858, Bartley married Sarah Sophia Barton, the daughter of stockbroker William Barton and the sister of Edmund Barton, the first Prime Minister of Australia. They had two sons and three daughters together.

In the 1860s Bartley built a house on the highest point in Hamilton which had unrivalled views of Brisbane and the Brisbane River. However, as the house was surrounded by dense bushland, his wife refused to live in it fearing attacks by Aboriginals leading to its nickname of Bartley's Folly, a name which persisted long after Bartley had sold the property. In 1879, Bartley objected to the continued use of the nickname, as he felt the "folly" implied a financial misjudgement on his part, whereas, taking all costs into account, he had actually made a profit of £400 on the house.

In 1892 in Brisbane, he published the book "Opals and Agates" which was based on his diaries and provided chatty sketches of people and events.

On 10 March 1894 Bartley, who had previously resided with his son for two-and-a-half years, left Brisbane for Sydney to secure subscribers to a second book to be entitled "Pioneers of Queensland," which he intended publishing shortly.

However, in early July 1894 in Sydney, he suffered from an internal pain which he blamed on bad baking powder in a scone that he had eaten and it was suggested this may have contributed to his death from heart failure on 10 July 1894 at his residence Richmond House, 1 Richmond Terrace, Domain, Sydney. He was survived by his wife, one of his two sons, and by three daughters. He was buried on 11 July 1894 in Waverley Cemetery.

His book "Pioneers of Queensland" was published posthumously in 1896 under the title "Australian Pioneers and Reminiscences" after being edited by John James Knight.

== Legacy ==
Bartley's Hill (27°25′53″S 153°03′07″E) in Ascot, Brisbane is named after him. Bartley had owned the hilltop.

Bartley's Folly was demolished in the 1920s to create a water reservoir on the top of the hill.

Richmond Terrace was demolished in 1935 to allow the State Library of New South Wales to expand.
