= The Sydney Wool and Stock Journal =

Newspaper published in Sydney, Australia from 1890 to 1917

The Sydney Wool and Stock Journal, 6 January 1899

The Sydney Wool and Stock Journal was a weekly newspaper published in Sydney, New South Wales, Australia from 1890 until 1917. It was originally published as The Sydney Wool and Produce Journal.

== History ==
The Sydney Wool and Produce Journal was first published on 15 November 1890 by John Leach of the Sydney Wool Exchange. The newspaper changed its name to The Sydney Wool and Stock Journal in 1899.

The Journal published market reports for the members of the Sydney Wool Selling Brokers' Association and the Fat Stock Salesmen's Association of Sydney.

The Journal was forced to cease publication in 1917 due to the rising cost of printing paper during World War I. The last issue was 30 March 1917, after which date it was amalgamated with The Sydney Stock and Station Journal.

== Digitisation ==
The paper has been digitised as part of the Australian Newspapers Digitisation Program project of the National Library of Australia.

== See also ==
- List of newspapers in Australia
- List of newspapers in New South Wales
- The Sydney Stock and Station Journal
