= Gresley Lukin =

Australian public servant, newspaper owner, company manager and editor

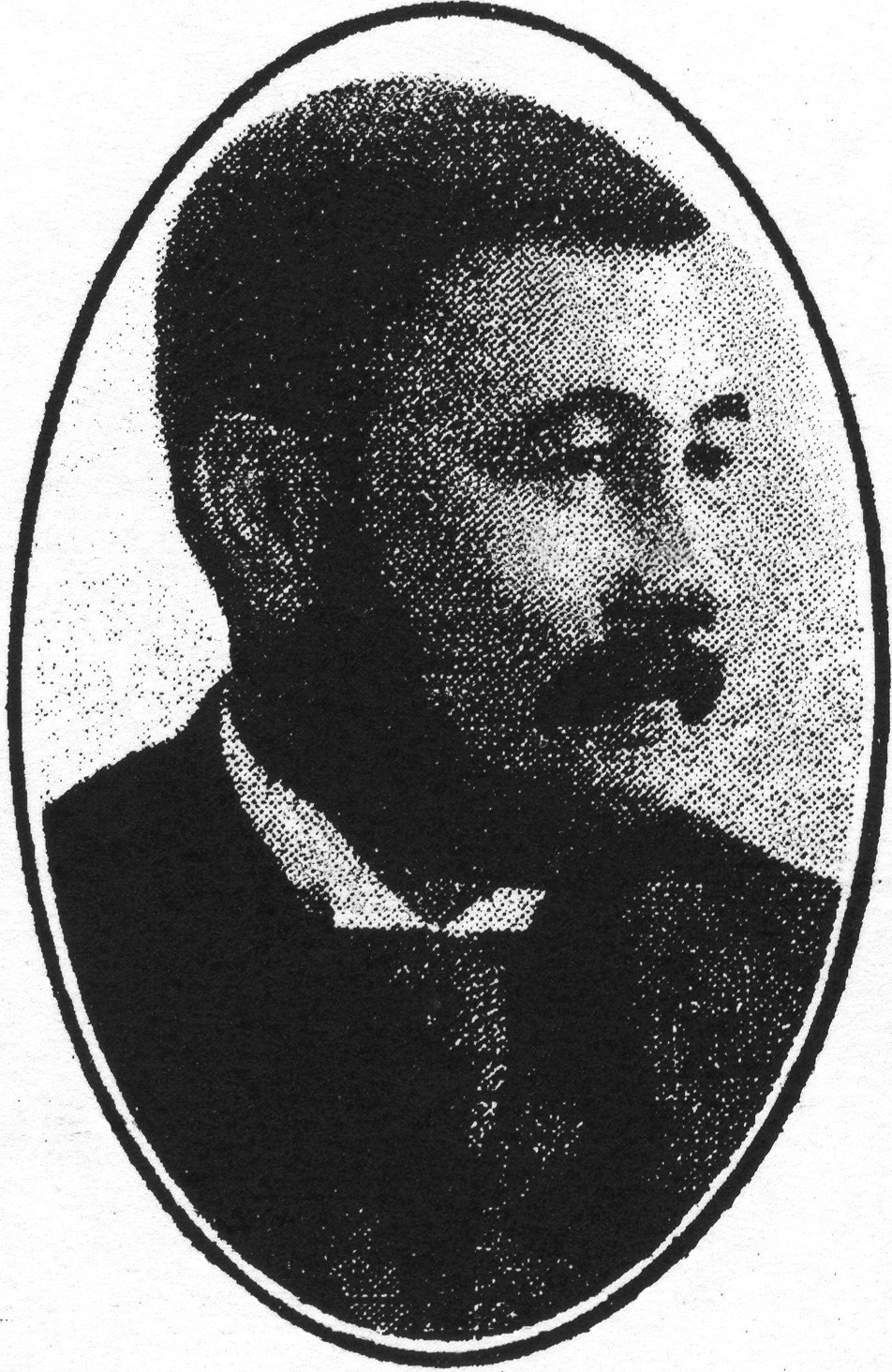
- Gresley Lukin about 1880 (photo: Brisbane Courier 1926)
- Born: 21 November 1840; Launceston, Tasmania
- Died: 12 September 1916 (aged 75); Wellington, New Zealand
- Occupations: Journalist, newspaper proprietor, editor-in-chief of the Brisbane Courier and its weekly the Queenslander, later the Queensland Boomerang 1890-1892, from 1896-1916 editor-in-chief of the Evening Post in Wellington, New Zealand.
- Years active: 1873-1880 (In Queensland) 1893-1916 (in New Zealand)
- Employer: Brisbane Newspaper Co
- Political party: independent liberal-oriented
- Spouse: Rebekah Hall

Gresley Lukin (1840–1916) was an Australian public servant, newspaper owner, company manager and newspaper editor, most prominently the part-proprietor of the Brisbane Newspaper Company (publisher of the Brisbane Courier and its weekly The Queenslander) from November 1873 to December 1880, then and still the leading journal in Queensland under the name The Courier-Mail.

== Early life ==
Lukin was born at Launceston, Tasmania on 21 November 1840, son of the brewer George Lukin and his wife Mary Anne, née Wilkins.

== Career ==
Lukin followed his elder brother George Lionel Lukin to Queensland in 1865, where he came to work as a clerk and public servant. He became chief clerk of the Queensland Supreme Court in 1871 but resigned in November 1873 after purchasing a third share in the Brisbane Newspaper company. Although Lukin took on the position as editor-in-chief of the Brisbane Courier, he was in fact working as the journal's 'managing editor', only occasionally being engaged in the practical editing and writing. The old Irish radical, William Augustine O'Carroll, was the de facto daily editor of the Courier during Lukin's entire period as managing editor. Yet Lukin was instrumental in consolidating the company's assets, the Brisbane Courier and its weekly The Queenslander, following a period of great and devastating turmoil in this journal's history. The Queenslander was the subject of Lukin's special and primary attention, he managed to turn this journal from being a simply weekly summary of its mother journal, to become a quality literary weekly engaging some of the best artist and writers available in the colony, writers such as William Henry Traill, Carl Feilberg, poets and writers such as James Brunton Stephens and writers of short stories such as "Redspinner" William Senior, Dick Newton, Horace Earle and many others, engaging eminent artists such as the illustrator Henry Houghtons, not to mention the drawers and painter Joseph Augustine Clarke to design the front pages and decorate certain columns of The Queenslander.

Lukin's period as part proprietor and managing editor came to an abrupt end in December 1880, following failed mining speculations and a personal bankruptcy in late 1879 which he only just managed to overcome in April 1880, following losses from which he would never fully recover. Lukin left Queensland but returned briefly in the late 1880s purchasing and afterwards editing William Lane's old journal The Boomerang from 1890 to its closure in 1892.

Lukin's seven years period of as managing editor of the Brisbane was crucial for the consolidation of the Brisbane Courier's position as Queensland's leading journal. Lukin gained an additional lasting reputation as a Queensland pioneer of compassion following his commissioning of Carl Feilberg to run a nine-month-long newspaper campaign for Aboriginal rights and against the colony's frontier policy and native police system in the Queenslander from March to December 1880, a campaign the key articles of which was turned into a famous pamphlet entitled 'The Way We Civilise; Black and White' in December 1880, as one of Lukin's last acts as managing editor of the Brisbane Newspaper Co.

== Affiliation ==
In September 1878 he was elected president of the newly formed Johnsonian Club.

== Later life ==
Lukin died at Wellington, New Zealand on 12 September 1916.
