= Alfred Gregory Yewen =

Australian agricultural writer, journalist and socialist

Alfred Gregory Yewen (16 May 1867 – 11 June 1923) was an Australian agricultural writer, journalist and socialist. Yewen was born in Croydon, Surrey, England and died in Newport, New South Wales.

== See also ==
- William Lane
- William Henry Thomas McNamara
- Henry George
- Gresley Lukin
- William Morris Hughes
- William Arthur Holman
- Francis Mephan Gellatly
- Sir Henry Parkes
