= Charles Hardie Buzacott =

Australian journalist (1835–1918)

Charles Buzacott
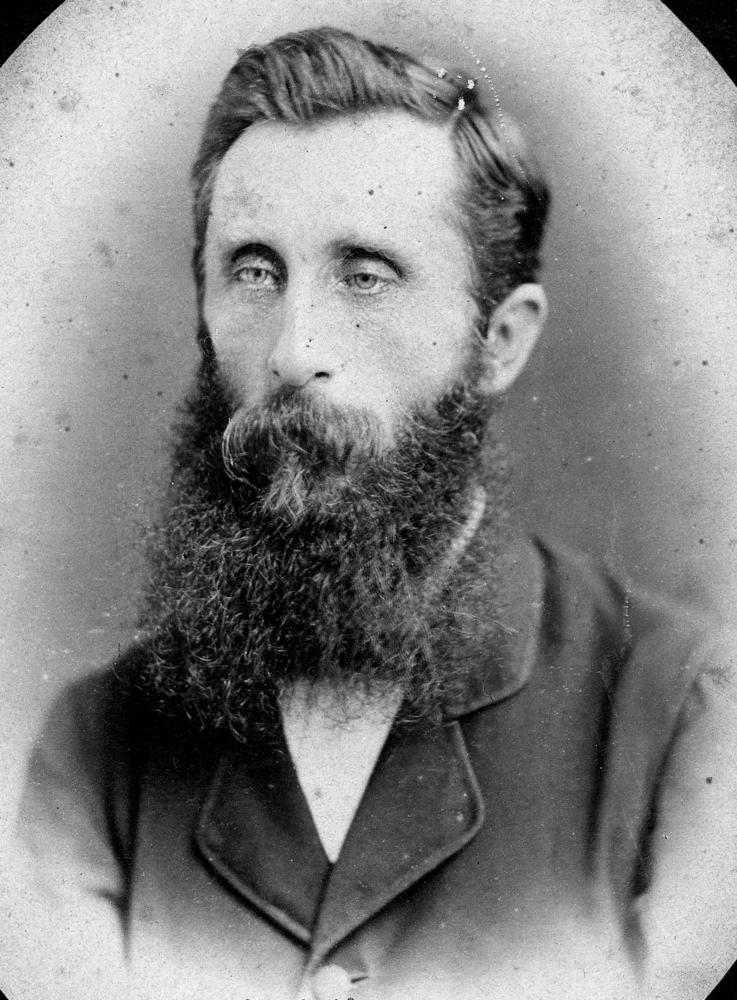
- Charles Hardie Buzacott in 1879

Member of the Queensland Legislative Assembly for Rockhampton
- In office 24 November 1873 – 31 October 1877
- Preceded by: Alexander Fyfe
- Succeeded by: John McFarlane

Member of the Queensland Legislative Council
- In office 21 January 1879 – 5 July 1882
- In office 23 August 1894 – 13 May 1901

Personal details
- Born: Charles Hardie Buzacott; 3 July 1835 Torrington, Devon, England
- Died: 19 July 1918 (aged 83) Stanthorpe, Queensland, Australia
- Spouse: Louisa Whiteford (m.1857 d.1918)
- Occupation: Compositor, Newspaper owner

Charles Hardie Buzacott (1 August 1835 – 19 July 1918) was an Australian journalist, publisher and politician.

== Early life ==
Buzacott was born in Torrington, Devonshire, England on 1 August 1835. son of James Buzacott and his wife Ann, née Hitchcock. He migrated with his elder brother William to Sydney in 1852.

== Journalism ==
In Sydney, Charles joined the Empire newspaper and learnt to be a compositor. In 1860, he went to Maryborough, Queensland, and established the Maryborough Chronicle, selling it four years later. Buzacott then went to the Clermont goldfield, and started the Peak Downs Telegram, which he edited. In 1869 Buzacott sold his interest in the Telegram and moved to Gladstone where he took over the Observer. In 1870 Charles joined his brother William on the Rockhampton Bulletin, which the latter had established in 1861.

In 1878 he moved to Brisbane, and became a leader writer on the Courier.

During November 1880, he purchased Gresley Lukin's shares in the Brisbane Newspaper Company, the proprietor of the Brisbane Courier and its weekly The Queenslander and took on Lukin's former position as the company's managing editor and director. He was to remain in this position until 1894, occasionally taking and active role in the editing and occasionally contributing articles and editorials for the journals.

== Politics ==
In 1873, Buzacott was elected to the Legislative Assembly of Queensland for Rockhampton.

He served until 1877 but was re-elected in 1879. He was appointed the postmaster-general the same year but retired at the end of the next year.

He was appointed to the Queensland Legislative Council in 1894; although a lifetime appointment, he resigned in May 1901 and did not hold political office again.

== Later life ==
He died at Banca View in Stanthorpe on 19 July 1918.

Buzacott had married Louisa Whiteford in 1857, who survived him with three sons and two daughters.

== Affiliation ==
Buzacott was the second president of the Johnsonian Club. He was elected in January 1880.

== Street name ==
A number of street names in the Brisbane suburb of Carina Heights are identical to the surnames of former Members of the Queensland Legislative Assembly. One of these is Buzacott Street.

Parliament of Queensland
Preceded by Alexander Fyfe	Member for Rockhampton; 1873–1877	Succeeded by John McFarlane
