= William Senior (historian) =

William Senior (1862–1937) was a British lawyer and legal historian. He was born in Wakefield, Yorkshire, the son of Thomas Senior, a local solicitor. William studied at Clare College, Cambridge 1879–1882, graduating B.A. He began practising as a solicitor himself in 1886, going into partnership 1890–1895 with his father and with Percival Barratt. When his father died, in 1895, he moved to London and trained as a barrister. He was called to the bar in 1896.

He was a contributor of short pieces on maritime history and law to Mariner's Mirror, as well as of satirical pieces to Punch, and also had poems published in The English Review, occasional pieces in Cornhill Magazine, and more substantial essays on maritime law in the Law Quarterly Review.

== Works ==
=== Books ===
- Tutor and Pupils: Talks about twelve law maxims, London, 1891.
- The Old Wakefield Theatre, Wakefield, 1894. Available on Internet Archive.
- Doctors' Commons and the Old Court of Admiralty: A Short History of the Civilians in England, London, 1922. Available on Internet Archive.
- Naval History in the Law Courts: A Selection of Old Maritime Cases, London, 1927.

=== Articles in Mariner's Mirror ===
1 (1911)

- "An Early Victorian Windfall" pp. 80–83.
- "The Battle of New Brighton" pp. 148–151.
- "The Rivals" pp. 180b-182b.
- "Some Naval Courts-Martial, 1701-2" pp. 241–244.
- "In a Good Cause: An Episode in the Slave Trade" pp. 276–279.
- "The Legend of the Betsy Cains" pp. 340–345.

2 (1912)

- "The Treasure Frigate Thetis" pp. 33–37.
- "Some Naval Courts-Martial, 1698" pp. 113–119.
- "Hockin's Case: and Incidentally of False Lights" pp. 196–200.
- "The Casting Away of the Adventure" pp. 289–293.

3 (1913)

- "The Marooning of Robert Jeffery" pp. 113–118.
- "The Beginning of Sidelights" pp. 257–264.
- "Smugglers Again" pp. 359–362.

4 (1914)

- "Neptune as Defendant" pp. 162–167.

6 (1920)

- "The Rutter of the Sea" pp. 243–246.

7 (1921)

- "Drake at the Suit of John Doughty" pp. 291–297.

10 (1924)

- "The Mace of the Admiralty Court" Mariner's Mirror, vol. 10, pp. 49–52, January 1924.
- "John the Painter" pp. 355–365.

13 (1927)

- "Sir Henry Penrice and Sir Thomas Salusbury" pp. 38–44.
- "The Judges of the High Court of Admiralty" pp. 333–347.

15 (1929)

- "The Bucentaur" pp. 131–138.

16 (1930)

- "The Navy as Penitentiary" pp. 313–318.

38 (1952)

- "The History of Maritime Law" pp. 260–275.

=== Articles in Law Quarterly Review ===
34 (1918)

- "Ransom Bills" pp. 49–62.
- "The Master-Mariner's Authority" pp. 347–356.

35 (1919)

- "The First Admiralty Judges" pp. 73–83.
- "Admiralty Matters in the Fifteenth Century" pp. 290–299.

36 (1920)

- "The Rise of the College of Advocates" pp. 128–139.

37 (1921)

- "Early Writers on Maritime Law" pp. 323–336.

39 (1923)

- "The Advocates of the Court of Arches" pp. 493–506.

40 (1924)

- "England and the Mediaeval Empire" pp. 483–494.

46 (1930)

- "Roman Law in England Before Vacarius" pp. 191–206.

47 (1931)

- "Roman Law MSS in England" pp. 337–344.

48 (1932)

- "Peter della Vigna" pp. 324–327.

49 (1933)

- "Cino da Pistoia" pp. 178– 182.

50 (1934)

- "Roffredo da Benevento" pp. 24–28.
- "Brocarda" pp. 334–336.

51 (1935)

- "Accursius and his Son Franciscus" pp. 513–516.

53 (1937)

- "Irnerius" pp. 322–325.

=== Miscellaneous essays ===
- "'The Rape of the Table'" Notes & Queries, ser. 11, vol. 7 (April 1913), p. 329.
- "The Law and Custom of Flags" Law Times 142 (1917), pp. 166–168, 183–184.
- "The Cruise of the Pylades" Cornhill Magazine, n.s., vol. 52 (1922). pp. 686–693.
- "An Act of State" Cornhill Magazine, n.s., vol. 54 (1923), pp. 561–566.
- "The Illeanon Pirates: An Early Victorian 'Wangle'" Cornhill Magazine, n.s., vol. 56 (1924), pp. 342–349.
- "The Sea Fencibles" Nineteenth Century 103 (1928), pp. 827–834.
- "State Barges" Nineteenth Century 108 (1930), pp. 100–105.
