= Queensland Figaro and Punch =

Newspaper in Brisbane, Queensland, Australia

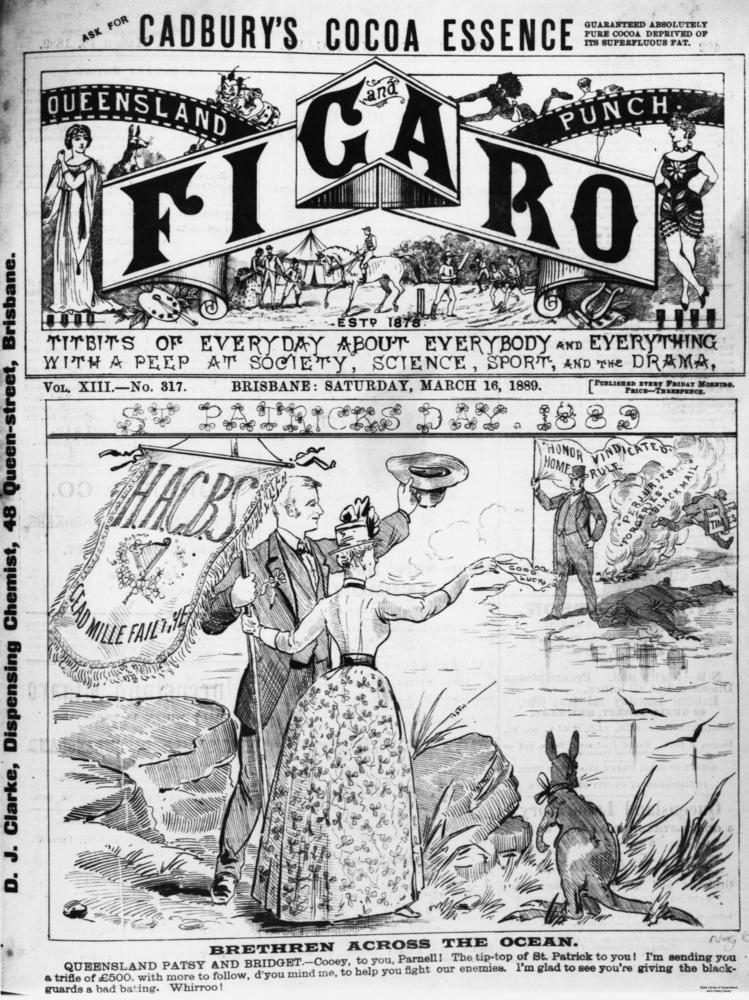
Queensland Figaro and Punch cover, 16 March 1889, depicting Irish Australians, bearing a banner of the HACBS and offering enthusiastic support to Parnell's struggle for Home Rule.

The Queensland Figaro and Punch was a weekly newspaper published from 1885 to 1936 in Brisbane, Queensland, Australia.

== History ==
The newspaper was a merger of two previous newspapers, the Queensland Figaro and the Queensland Punch. The Queensland Figaro was originally published on January 6, 1883 by John Edgar (Bobby) Byrne. From 1901 until 1936 the newspaper was once again published under its original name, with print stopping only during First World War and several years thereafter.

The paper has been digitised as part of the Australian Newspapers Digitisation Program of the National Library of Australia.

== See also ==
- List of newspapers in Australia
