= Queensland Newspapers =

Queensland Newspapers is the Queensland, Australia-based subsidiary of News Corporation. Queensland Newspapers is responsible for publishing The Courier-Mail daily newspaper.

== List of Queensland Newspapers ==
Toowoomba Chronicle
