= The Courier-Mail =

Australian daily newspaper, founded 1846

- Front page, 25 July 2008, with the aftermath of the Liberal National Party merger headlining
- Type: Daily newspaper
- Format: Tabloid
- Owner: News Corp Australia
- Publisher: Queensland Newspapers
- Editor: Chris Jones
- Founded: 1846
- Language: English
- Headquarters: Brisbane, Australia; 41 Campbell St; Bowen Hills QLD 4006
- Circulation: 172,801 Monday–Friday; 228,650 Saturday
- ISSN: 1322-5235
- Website: www.couriermail.com.au

The Courier-Mail is an Australian newspaper published in Brisbane. Owned by News Corp Australia, it is published daily from Monday to Saturday in tabloid format. Its editorial offices are located at Bowen Hills, in Brisbane's inner northern suburbs, and it is printed at Yandina on the Sunshine Coast. It is available for purchase both online and in paper form throughout Queensland and most regions of Northern New South Wales.

== History ==
=== 19th century origins ===
The history of The Courier-Mail is through four mastheads. The Moreton Bay Courier later became The Courier, then the Brisbane Courier and, since a merger with the Daily Mail in 1933, The Courier-Mail.

The Moreton Bay Courier was established as a weekly paper in June 1846. Its first editorial promised to "make known the wants of the community ... to rouse the apathetic, to inform the ignorant ... to transmit truthful representations of the state of this unrivalled portion of the colony to other and distant parts of the globe; to encourage every enterprise that will tend to benefit it, and in general to advance its interests, and promote its prosperity".

Issue frequency increased steadily to bi-weekly in January 1858, tri-weekly in December 1859, then daily under the editorship of Theophilus Parsons Pugh from 14 May 1861. The recognised founder and first editor was Arthur Sidney Lyon (1817–1861) who was assisted by its printer, James Swan (1811–1891), the later mayor of Brisbane and member of Queensland Legislative Council. Lyon, also referred to as the "father of the Press" in the colony of Queensland, had previously served as a writer and journalist in Melbourne, and later moved on to found and edit journals such as Moreton Bay Free Press, North Australian and Darling Downs Gazette. Lyon was encouraged to emigrate by John Dunmore Lang and arrived in Brisbane from Sydney in early 1846 to establish a newspaper. He persuaded James Swan, a printer of Lang's Sydney newspaper The Colonialist to join him. Lyon and Swan established themselves on the corner of Queen Street and Albert Street, Brisbane, in a garret of a building later known as the North Star Hotel. The first issue of the Moreton Bay Courier, consisting of 4 pages, appeared weekly on Saturday 20 June 1846, with Lyon as editor and Swan as publisher.

After some 18 months, Lyon and Swan disagreed on many aspects of editorial policy, including transportation of convicts and squatting. Lyon took over sole control in late 1847, but had money problems, and gave sole control to Swan. Swan sold out to Thomas Blacket Stephens in about November 1859.The Moreton Bay Courier became The Courier, and then the Brisbane Courier in 1864. In June–July 1868, Stephens floated a new company, and transferred the plant and copyright of the Brisbane Courier to "The Brisbane Newspaper Company". He was the managing director until retired in November 1873, when the paper was auctioned.

The journal was, from November 1873 to December 1880, managed by one of the new part-owners, the Tasmanian-born former public servant Gresley Lukin (1840–1916). Although called "managing editor", actual writing and editing was by William Augustine O'Carroll (1831–1885). Most prominent of the various editors and sub-editors of The Queenslander literary staff were William Henry Traill (1842–1902), later NSW politician and editor of the famed Sydney journal 'The Bulletin', and Carl Adolph Feilberg (1844–1887). Feilberg followed William Henry Trail in the role of political commentator and the de facto editor of The Queenslander until January 1881. He succeeded William O'Carroll as Courier editor-in-chief from September 1883 to his death in October 1887. Lukin's roles as part owner-editor changed on 21 December 1880. Charles Hardie Buzacott, former Postmaster General in the first McIlwraith government, had been a staff journalist.

=== 20th century ===
John James Knight was editor-in-chief of The Brisbane Courier from 1906 to 1916, later managing director, then chairman of all of the company's publications.

The first edition of The Courier-Mail was published on 28 August 1933, after Keith Murdoch's Herald and Weekly Times acquired and merged The Brisbane Courier and the Daily Mail (first published on 3 October 1903). In 1987, Rupert Murdoch's News Limited acquired newspaper control, and outstanding shares of Queensland Newspapers Pty Ltd.

The Courier-Mail launched its first website in 1998.

Front page, 12 December 2005, prior to conversion to tabloid (headline refers to the 2005 Cronulla riots)

=== 21st century ===
From its inception until March 2006 The Courier-Mail was a broadsheet newspaper. On 14 December 2005 it was announced that the paper would change to a tabloid sometime in early 2006, however the term "tabloid" was not used in favour of the term "compact". This linguistic choice was probably related to widespread public view that many tabloids, including those published by News Limited, were low quality publications. The last broadsheet edition was published on Saturday 11 March 2006, and the first tabloid edition was published on Monday 13 March 2006. On the same day, the paper's website was revamped and expanded.

The change to a tabloid format brought The Courier-Mail in line with all other News Limited Australian metropolitan daily newspapers. It followed the change to a tabloid format by The Advertiser of Adelaide—another News Corporation newspaper—some years earlier.

== Recognition ==
The Courier-Mail has twice been named news destination of the year by the Pacific Area Publishers Association and once the national/metro daily newspaper of the year.

It has a history of advocating for its community, and in 2022 was recognised by Queensland Treasurer Cameron Dick as being the catalyst for an extra $425m in funding every year for mental health services.

The Courier-Mail was inducted into the Queensland Business Leaders Hall of Fame in 2015.

== Political position ==
Like other News Corp Australia newspaper, The Courier-Mail holds generally conservative political positions. Before 2010 News Corp Australia media was more politically flexible, but have become much more rigid as Lachlan Murdoch's influence at the company has grown - as of 2024, The Australian has endorsed the Liberal Party at each of the past five federal elections, while none of the four daily metros, including the Courier-Mail, have endorsed Labor since at least 2010.

In 2007, Crikey described it as "...to the right, as the sleepier Murdoch tabloids always are – but it's more lazy populism than ideological fervour".

=== Endorsements ===
National election	Endorsement
2010	Coalition
2013	Coalition
2016	Coalition
2019	Coalition
2022	Coalition
2025	Coalition

== Criticism and legal issues ==
The Courier-Mail has been described by Crikey as "one of the contestants in a close run field for worst paper in Australia... mostly predictable and dull, with occasional honourable exceptions...".

In August 2011, police and the parents of a murder victim criticised the paper for falsely accusing their son of a child sex crime.

On 24 March 2014 Queensland Newspapers, the News Corp Australia subsidiary responsible for publishing the Courier-Mail, was found guilty by a District Court of breaching restrictions on publishing Family Court proceedings on four occasions, and fined a total of $120,000. The breaches occurred in 2012 when the Courier-Mail published on its front page the names and photos of a mother and her children involved in a Family Court dispute. District Court Justice Terence Martin said: "It seems to me that the newspaper seized upon what it regarded as a sensational story, which would be attractive to readers, and put the story ahead of its legal obligations".

On 7 October 2014, the paper published a transphobic headline related to the gruesome murder of Mayang Prasetyo.

The paper raised controversy for depicting Indonesian president Joko Widodo with a doctored photo of bloody hands to protest against the country's decision to execute two Australian convicted drug smugglers known as part of the Bali Nine in 2015.

== Circulation and readership ==
In 2013, The Courier-Mail had the fourth-highest circulation of any daily newspaper in Australia. Its average Monday-Friday net paid print sales were 172,801 between January and March 2013, having fallen 8.0 per cent compared to the previous year. Its average Saturday net paid print sales were 228,650 between January and March 2013, down 10.5 per cent compared to the previous year. The paper's Monday-Friday readership was 488,000 in March 2013, having fallen 11.6 per cent compared to the previous year. Its Saturday readership was 616,000 in March 2013, down 13.8 per cent compared to the previous year. Around three-quarters of the paper's readership is located in the Brisbane metropolitan area.

Although often claimed to be Brisbane's only daily newspaper since the demise of Queensland Newspapers' own afternoon newspaper The Telegraph in 1988, it arguably has had two competitors since 2007. News Corp itself published mX, a free afternoon newspaper, from 2007, but mX had a relatively low news content, and was discontinued in mid-2015. Fairfax Media has published the online only Brisbane Times since 2007.

As of August 2015, according to third-party web analytics providers Alexa and SimilarWeb, Courier-Mail's website was the 141st and 273rd most visited in Australia respectively. At the same time, SimilarWeb rated the site as the 25th most visited news website in Australia, attracting almost 2.6 million visitors per month.

== Awards sponsorship ==
The Courier-Mail has co-sponsored two sets of literary awards.

The Courier-Mail Book of the Year Award, co-sponsored by Queensland Government and worth A$30,000, was established in 1999, and covered a range of writing genres. The inaugural prize was awarded in 2001, and the last one in 2005. The winners of this award were:

- 2001: Joint winners: The Schoonermaster's Dance, by Alan Gould, and True History of the Kelly Gang, by Peter Carey
- 2002: Recollections of a Bleeding Heart: A Portrait of Paul Keating PM, by Don Watson
- 2003: Wings of the Kite-Hawk, by Nicolas Rothwell
- 2004: The White Earth, by Andrew McGahan
- 2005: The Silver Donkey: A Novel for Children, by Sonya Hartnett
- 2005 - People's Choice Award: The Running Man, by Michael Gerard Bauer

From 2012 and as of 2023, The Courier-Mail People's Choice Queensland Book of the Year has been awarded as part of the Queensland Literary Awards. Again co-sponsored by The Courier-Mail and the Queensland Government, this prize is awarded "to an outstanding book by a Queensland author, taken from eligible books entered in the Fiction and Non-Fiction categories".

== Digitisation ==
Pre-1955 issues of the newspaper have been digitised as part of the Australian Newspapers Digitisation Program of the National Library of Australia.

== Editors and journalists ==
For thirty years, the paper's senior rugby league football journalist was former Australian vice-captain Jack Reardon. Sports editor at The Courier Mail, Tom Linneth, became the youngest editor in Australia in 1960 at the age of 29. He worked at The Courier Mail between about 1948 to 1974 and again worked there as the sports editor between about 1982 until he retired in 1996.

Chris Jones was appointed editor from 2020, replacing Sam Weir. Jones had worked for News Corp for 21 years.

As of November 2023 the editorial cartoonist is Sean Leahy.

- Jun 1846 – Dec 1847: Arthur Sidney Lyon (first editor)
- Dec 1847 – c. 1850: James Swan
- Early to mid-1850s: William Charles Wilkes
- 1859: Richard Belford (former editor of Ballarat Star and later editor of the North Australian)
- 1859–1863: Theophilus Parsons Pugh (also the creator and publisher of Pugh's Almanac)
- 1864–1866: David Frederick Tudor Jones
- 1867–c. 1869: William O'Carroll
- 1869–1873: George Hall ("the Bohemian")
- 1873–1875: Gresley Lukin (assisted by William O'Carroll)
- 1875 – Dec 1880: William O'Carroll (as the de facto editor, officially edited by the managing editor Gresley Lukin)
- Jan 1881– Sep 1883: William O'Carroll (as the de facto editor, although officially edited by the managing editor Charles Hardie Buzacott)
- Sep 1883 – Oct 1887: Carl Adolph Feilberg
- Oct 1887 – Dec 1887: Edmund John T Barton (later author of the Jubilee History of Queensland)
- Jan 1888 – Jun 1891: William Kinnaird Rose
- Jan 1894 – Nov 1898: Frederick William Ward
- Dec 1898 – Apr 1903: Charles Brunsdon Fletcher (son-in-law of Sir Arthur Rutledge)
- April 1903 – 1906: Edmund John T Barton (later author of the Jubilee History of Queensland)
- 1906 – Jun 1916: John James Knight
- Jun 1916 – Jun 1919: John MacGregor
- Jun 1919 – 1932?: R. Sanderson Taylor
- 1932 – Dec 1933: Firman McKinnon
- Jan 1934 – Sep 1936: Reginald Tingey Foster (also Editor-in-Chief The Courier-Mail, The Sunday Mail, The Queenslander)
- late 1936 – 1938: Charles E Sligo (news editor, acting editor)
- Apr 1938 – late 1941: Jack C Waters (also Editor-in-Chief The Courier-Mail, The Sunday Mail, The Queenslander (to 1939))
- 1942 – 1968: Theodor Charles Bray (later Sir Theodor) (after 1953 also Editor-in-Chief The Courier-Mail, The Sunday Mail)
- 1968 – 1969: Alan F Cummins
- 1969 – 1979: John R Atherton
- 1979 – 1984: Kevin J Kavanagh
- Mar 1984 – Mar 1987: David C Smith (Feb 1986 – Mar 1987 also Editor-in-Chief The Courier-Mail, The Sunday Mail)
- Mar 1987 – Apr 1991: Greg Chamberlin (Ron Richards, managing editor)
- Apr 1991 – Apr 1995: Jack Lunn (Editor-in-Chief The Courier-Mail, The Sunday Mail)
- Apr 1991 – Apr 1995: Des Houghton (reporting to Jack Lunn)
- Apr 1995 – Jun 2002: Chris Mitchell (also Editor-in-Chief The Courier-Mail, The Sunday Mail)
- Jun 2002 – Mar 2010: David Fagan
- Mar 2010 – June 2013: Michael Crutcher (reporting to David Fagan – Editor-in-Chief of The Courier-Mail and the Sunday Mail)
- June 2013 – Dec 2015: Chris Dore
- Jan 2016 – Aug 2017: Lachlan Heywood
- Sep 2017 – Dec 2019: Sam Weir
- Jan 2020 – : Chris Jones

== See also ==
- The Sunday Mail
- List of newspapers in Australia
