= John James Knight =

John James Knight (7 June 1863 – 24 November 1927) was an Australian journalist, newspaper editor and historian. He is noted as a writer on Australian history, especially that of Queensland. Among his works are:

- In the Early Days
- The Story of South Africa, part author
- Brisbane Past and Present and The True War Spirit
- Nehemiah Bartley, Australian Pioneers and Reminiscences, editor

Knight was born at Shelton, Staffordshire, England, the son of James Knight, potter and printer, and his wife Louisa, née Blagg. Knight was taken to New Zealand whilst young and at 11 years of age left school to work. He died of pneumonia at Brisbane on 24 November 1927.
