= William Senior (journalist) =

Anglo-Australian journalist, editor and writer

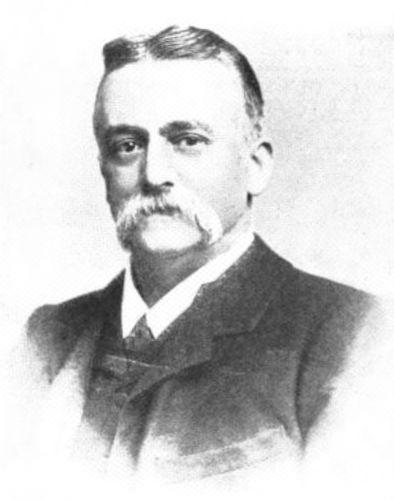
- In The Sketch, 18 October 1899
- Born: 29 March 1838; Sherborne, England
- Died: 7 October 1920 (aged 82); London, England
- Burial place: Highgate Cemetery
- Occupations: Journalist, editor, writer

William Senior (29 March 1838 – 7 October 1920) was an Anglo-Australian journalist, angler, "Chief Hansard Short Hand Writer", co-founder of Brisbane's famed Johnsonian Club, editor and writer of short stories, known also by his pen name "Red Spinner".

== Biography ==
Senior was born in Sherborne, Dorset, England in 1838, son of Joseph Senior and wife Martha.

Senior became the first officially appointed Principal Short Hand writer for the Parliament of Queensland's Hansard (record of proceedings). He had by then served ten years as a special correspondent and parliamentary reporter for the London Daily News and London special reporter for the Manchester Examiner when he was employed (on the instigation of Queensland's Colonial Secretary and Premier, Arthur Macalister and the Speaker, William Henry Walsh), as Queensland Parliament's first Short Hand Writer on 13 January 1876. He was an able writer who produced in his spare time a number of short stories for the Queenslander during his time in office, simultaneously being a Queensland correspondent for his old journal the London Daily News.

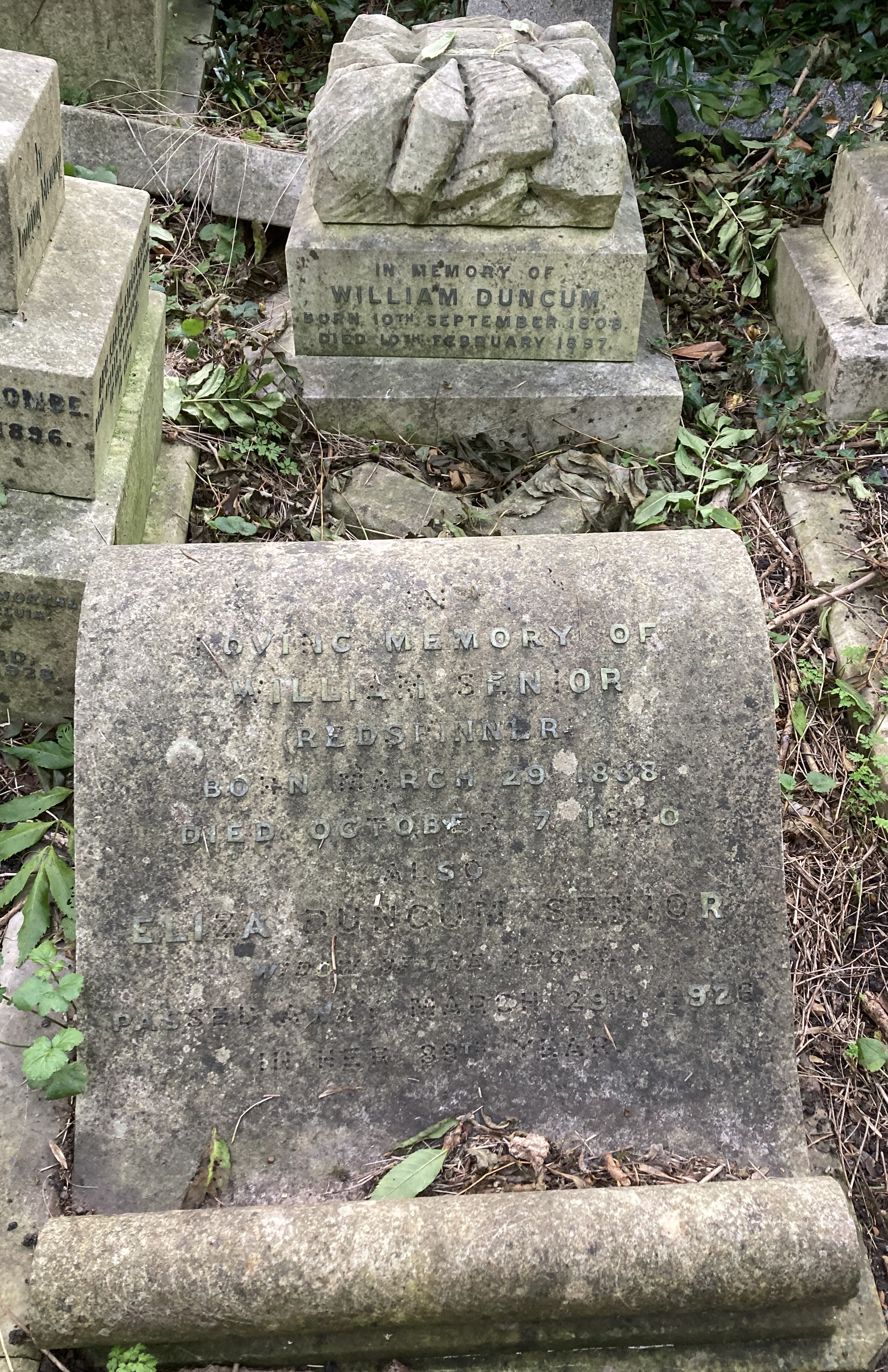
Grave of William Senior in Highgate Cemetery

Senior returned to England in April 1881 where he took up his old profession as a journalist on the Daily News and editor. He became editor-in-chief of the sports journal The Field, of which he was formerly the angling editor. He wrote and edited this journal for over twenty-five years, still frequently using his old pen name "Red Spinner", simultaneously being for a number of years the London correspondent for the Brisbane Courier.

He died in London on 7 October 1920, and was buried on the eastern side of Highgate Cemetery.

== Books ==
- Notable Shipwrecks, 1873
- Waterside sketches. A book for wanderers and anglers, London 1875.
- By stream and sea. A book for wanderers and anglers, London 1877.
- Anderton's Angling, a novelette, 1878
- Travel and Trout in the Antipodes, 1880
- Scotch loch-fishing by "Black Palmer" [pseud.], Edinburgh 1882.
- Angling in Great Britain, London 1883.
- Sea fishing by "John Bickerdyke" [pseud.] with contributions on "Antipodean and foreign fish" by W. Senior, "Tarpon" by A.C. Harmsworth, "Whaling" by Sir H.W. Gore-Booth, London 1895.
- Pike and perch (with chapters by "John Bickerdyke" [pseud.] and W. H. Pope, Cookery by Alexander Innes Shand; illustrated by George Roller and from photographs). London 1900
- Lines in Pleasant Places: Being the Aftermath of an Old Angler, London 1920.
