= The Queenslander =

Australian newspaper

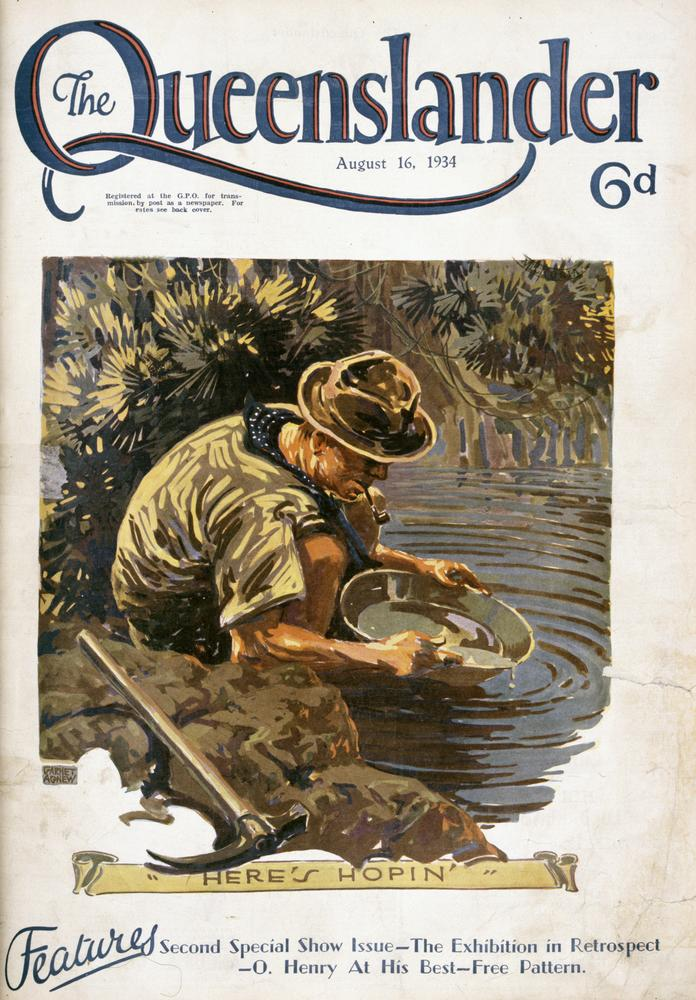
- The Queenslander, August 16, 1934
- Type: Weekly literary magazine
- Owner: Brisbane Newspaper Co.
- Founder: Thomas B. Stephens
- Managing editor: Gresley Lukin
- Launched: 3 February 1866
- Ceased publication: 22 February 1939
- Sister newspapers: Brisbane Courier
- ISSN: 1836-8190

The Queenslander was the weekly summary and literary edition of the Brisbane Courier, the leading journal in the colony (later state) of Queensland (Australia) since the 1850s. The Queenslander was launched by the Brisbane Newspaper Company in 1866, and discontinued in 1939.

== History ==
The Queenslander was first published on 3 February 1866 in Brisbane by Thomas Blacket Stephens. The last edition was printed on 22 February 1939.

In a country the size of Australia, a daily newspaper of some prominence could only reach the bush and outlying districts if it also published a weekly edition. Yet The Queenslander, under the managing editorship of Gresley Lukin—managing editor from November 1873 until December 1880—also came to find additional use as a literary magazine.

Angus Mackay, later a politician, was its first editor.

In September 1919, a series of aerial photographs of Brisbane and its surrounding suburbs were published under the title, Brisbane By Air. The photographs were taken by the newspaper's photographer, Frederick William Thiel and were promoted as the first photographs taken of Brisbane from an aeroplane.

The paper has been digitised as part of the Australian Newspapers Digitisation Project by the National Library of Australia.

== See also ==
- Carl Feilberg, who campaigned for Indigenous rights in the paper
- List of newspapers in Australia
